= List of Kansas City Chiefs award winners =

This page details awards won by the Kansas City Chiefs, a professional American football team from the National Football League. The Chiefs have never had a winner of the Coach of the Year award, Offensive Rookie of the Year, or Defensive Player of the Year. The Chiefs are tied with the Chicago Bears for the most winners of the Walter Payton Man of the Year award with 5.

The most recent winner of a major NFL award is Patrick Mahomes who won league MVP for the 2022 season, his second time winning the award.

The Chiefs have two awards that are awarded by the team which are voted on by the players and coaches. The Derrick Thomas award is awarded to the team MVP and the Mack Lee Hill award is awarded to the Rookie of the Year.

Mahomes has won the most awards of any Chiefs player. He has won a total of fifteen awards, six awards from the NFL, six from outside the NFL, and three awarded by the Chiefs. He also was a member of 3 different teams that won team awards at the ESPYs. He has won 8 different awards.

== Individual league awards ==
=== National Football League Most Valuable Player: (2) ===
2018: Patrick Mahomes, QB
2022: Patrick Mahomes, QB

=== Defensive Rookie of the Year: (4) ===
1984: Bill Maas, DT
1989: Derrick Thomas, LB
1992: Dale Carter, CB
2015: Marcus Peters, CB

=== Offensive Player of the Year: (2) ===
2002: Priest Holmes, RB
2018: Patrick Mahomes, QB

=== Super Bowl MVP: (4) ===
1969: Len Dawson, QB (IV)
2019: Patrick Mahomes, QB (LIV)
2022: Patrick Mahomes, QB (LVII)
2023: Patrick Mahomes, QB (LVIII)

=== Walter Payton Man of the Year Award: (5) ===
1972: Willie Lanier, LB
1973: Len Dawson, QB
1993: Derrick Thomas, LB
2003: Will Shields, G
2009: Brian Waters, G

=== Comeback Player of the Year: (1) ===
2015: Eric Berry, S

== Non-league awards ==
Awards listed below are awards provided outside of the NFL.

=== ESPY Award ===
Individual

2016: Eric Berry, S, Best Comeback Player
2019: Patrick Mahomes, QB, Best NFL Player
2021: Laurent Duvernay-Tardif, T, Muhammad Ali Sports Humanitarian Award
2023: Patrick Mahomes, QB, Best NFL Player
2023: Patrick Mahomes, QB, Best Male Athlete

2024: Patrick Mahomes, QB, Best Male Athlete

Team

2019: 2018 Team, Best Game, 2018 Regular Season game vs Los Angeles Rams
2022: 2021 team, Best Game, 2021-22 NFL Playoffs Divisional game vs Buffalo Bills
2023: 2022 team, Best Team

=== Sports Illustrated Sportsperson of the Year ===
2020: Patrick Mahomes, QB
2020: Laurent Duvernay-Tardif, T

=== Time Magazine 100 Most Influential People ===
2020: Patrick Mahomes, QB
2023: Patrick Mahomes, QB

=== People's Choice Awards Best Athlete ===
2024: Travis Kelce, TE

== Individual team awards ==
=== Ed Block Courage Award ===
The Ed Block Courage Award has annually honored one player from every NFL team who exemplifies commitment to the principles of sportsmanship and courage. The award is selected by a vote of their teammates.

- 1983 Dave Lutz
- 1984 Kevin Ross
- 1985 Mark Robinson
- 1986 Dino Hackett
- 1987 Lloyd Burruss
- 1988 Christian Okoye
- 1989 Deron Cherry
- 1990 Jayice Pearson
- 1991 Rich Baldinger
- 1992 Albert Lewis
- 1993 Neil Smith
- 1994 John Alt
- 1995 Dave Szott
- 1996 Lake Dawson
- 1997 Glenn Parker
- 1998 Tim Grunhard
- 1999 Eric Hicks
- 2000 Tony Richardson
- 2001 Tony Richardson
- 2002 John Browning
- 2003 Jerome Woods
- 2004 Priest Holmes
- 2005 Will Shields
- 2006 Benny Sapp
- 2007 Eddie Kennison
- 2008 Damon Huard
- 2009 Brodie Croyle
- 2010 Dustin Colquitt
- 2011 Jon McGraw
- 2012 Jamaal Charles
- 2013 Rodney Hudson
- 2014 Travis Kelce
- 2015 Eric Berry
- 2016 Justin Houston
- 2017 Derrick Johnson
- 2018 Dee Ford
- 2019 Eric Fisher
- 2020 Austin Reiter
- 2021 Joe Thuney

=== Derrick Thomas Award ===
The Derrick Thomas Award is given to the Chiefs MVP as determined by the players and coaches. The award was named after the former Chiefs linebacker beginning with the 2001 award. Running back Jamaal Charles has won the award more times than any other player. Charles won the award 4 times.

- 1979 Gary Barbaro
- 1980 Art Still
- 1981 Joe Delaney
- 1982 Gary Green
- 1983 Bill Kenney
- 1984 Art Still
- 1985 Lloyd Burruss
- 1986 Albert Lewis
- 1987 Carlos Carson
- 1988 Deron Cherry
- 1989 Christian Okoye
- 1990 Steve DeBerg
- 1991 Derrick Thomas
- 1992 Neil Smith
- 1993 Marcus Allen
- 1994 Derrick Thomas
- 1995 Marcus Allen
- 1996 Mark Collins
- 1997 Andre Rison
- 1998 Glenn Parker
- 1999 Marvcus Patton
- 2000 Derrick Alexander
- 2001 Priest Holmes
- 2002 Priest Holmes
- 2003 Trent Green
- 2004 Trent Green
- 2005 Larry Johnson
- 2006 Larry Johnson
- 2007 Jared Allen
- 2008 Tony Gonzalez
- 2009 Jamaal Charles
- 2010 Jamaal Charles
- 2011 Derrick Johnson
- 2012 Jamaal Charles
- 2013 Jamaal Charles
- 2014 Justin Houston
- 2015 Alex Smith & Eric Berry
- 2016 Eric Berry
- 2017 Alex Smith
- 2018 Patrick Mahomes
- 2019 Tyrann Mathieu
- 2020 Travis Kelce
- 2021 Tyrann Mathieu
- 2022 Patrick Mahomes
- 2023 Patrick Mahomes

=== Mack Lee Hill Award ===
The Mack Lee Hill Award is given to the Chiefs rookie of the year as determined by the players and coaches. It has been awarded since 1966. The award was named after former Chiefs running back Mack Lee Hill beginning in 2001.

- 1966 Mike Garrett
- 1967 Jan Stenerud
- 1968 Robert Holmes
- 1969 Jim Marsalis
- 1970 Jack Rudnay
- 1971 Elmo Wright
- 1972 Larry Marshall
- 1973 Gary Butler
- 1974 Woody Green
- 1975 Walter White
- 1976 Gary Barbaro
- 1977 Gary Green
- 1978 Don Parrish
- 1979 Bob Grupp
- 1980 Eric Harris
- 1981 Lloyd Burruss
- 1982 Les Studdard
- 1983 David Lutz
- 1984 Kevin Ross
- 1985 Jeff Smith
- 1986 Dino Hackett
- 1987 Christian Okoye
- 1988 James Saxon
- 1989 Derrick Thomas
- 1990 Percy Snow
- 1991 Tracy Simien
- 1992 Willie Davis
- 1993 Will Shields
- 1994 Lake Dawson
- 1995 Tamarick Vanover
- 1996 Reggie Tongue
- 1997 Tony Gonzalez
- 1998 Victor Riley
- 1999 Mike Maslowski
- 2000 Greg Wesley
- 2001 Eric Downing
- 2002 Scott Fujita
- 2003 Jimmy Wilkerson & Kawika Mitchell
- 2004 Jared Allen
- 2005 Derrick Johnson
- 2006 Tamba Hali
- 2007 Dwayne Bowe
- 2008 Maurice Leggett
- 2009 Ryan Succop
- 2010 Eric Berry
- 2011 Justin Houston
- 2012 Dontari Poe
- 2013 Marcus Cooper
- 2014 De'Anthony Thomas
- 2015 Marcus Peters
- 2016 Tyreek Hill
- 2017 Kareem Hunt
- 2018 Andrew Wylie
- 2019 Mecole Hardman
- 2020 Clyde Edwards-Helaire
- 2021 Nick Bolton
- 2022 Isiah Pacheco
- 2023 Rashee Rice
