= 2013 Pro Bowl =

National Football League all-star game

2013 NFL Pro Bowl
AFC	NFC
35	62
Head coach: John Fox (Denver Broncos)	Head coach: Mike McCarthy (Green Bay Packers)
	1	2	3	4	Total
AFC	7	7	7	14	35
NFC	7	24	21	10	62
- Date: January 27, 2013
- Stadium: Aloha Stadium; Honolulu, Hawaii
- MVP: Kyle Rudolph (Minnesota Vikings)
- Referee: Ed Hochuli
- Attendance: 47,134

Ceremonies
- National anthem: Brian McKnight
- Coin toss: Marcus Allen and Eric Dickerson

TV in the United States
- Network: NBC
- Announcers: Al Michaels, Cris Collinsworth, Michele Tafoya and Doug Flutie
- Nielsen ratings: 7.1 (nationally)

The 2013 Pro Bowl was the National Football League (NFL)'s sixty-third annual all-star game which featured players from the 2012 season. It took place at 2:30 pm Hawaii–Aleutian Time (UTC−10:00; 7:30 pm Eastern Time) on Sunday, January 27, 2013, at the Aloha Stadium in Honolulu, Hawaii. The game was televised nationally by NBC in place of CBS. The game was delayed for 30 minutes due to flash flood warnings.

John Fox of the AFC West Denver Broncos led the AFC "home team" against a "visiting" NFC team that was coached by the Green Bay Packers head coach Mike McCarthy of the NFC North. These coaches were selected for coaching the highest seeded team to lose in the Divisional Round of the playoffs, which has been the convention since the 2009 Pro Bowl. Ed Hochuli was the game referee.

Players on the winning team (NFC) each earned $50,000, while players on the losing team (AFC) earned $25,000.

The Houston Texans had the most Pro Bowl selections with ten. The Kansas City Chiefs, despite only winning two games, had six selections. Six teams, the Carolina Panthers, Philadelphia Eagles, St. Louis Rams, Tennessee Titans, Jacksonville Jaguars, and San Diego Chargers, had no selections. Three rookie quarterbacks (Andrew Luck, Robert Griffin III, and Russell Wilson) were selected, which is the most in Pro Bowl history.

As of 2024, this remains the most recent game that the NFC defeated the AFC in the Pro Bowl (excluding the Pro Bowl Games.)

== Summary ==
=== Scoring summary ===
The scores broken down by quarter:

Scoring Play	Time	Score
1st quarter
AFC – A. J. Green 6 yd. pass from Peyton Manning (Phil Dawson kick)	14:07	AFC 7–0
NFC – Vincent Jackson 36 yd. pass from Drew Brees (Blair Walsh kick)	10:17	Tied 7–7
2nd quarter
NFC – Blair Walsh 48 yd. Field Goal	15:00	NFC 10–7
AFC – Derrick Johnson 42 yd. Interception Return (Phil Dawson kick)	11:24	AFC 14–10
NFC – Victor Cruz 9 yd. pass from Eli Manning (Blair Walsh kick)	7:03	NFC 17–14
NFC – Marshawn Lynch 1 yd. run (Blair Walsh kick)	1:47	NFC 24–14
NFC – Kyle Rudolph 3 yd. pass from Eli Manning (Blair Walsh kick)	0:06	NFC 31–14
3rd quarter
NFC – Doug Martin 28 yd. pass from Russell Wilson (Blair Walsh kick)	13:06	NFC 38–14
AFC – Joshua Cribbs 4 yd. pass from Matt Schaub (Phil Dawson kick)	6:28	NFC 38–21
NFC – Larry Fitzgerald 9 yd. pass from Russell Wilson (Blair Walsh kick)	3:59	NFC 45–21
NFC – Vincent Jackson 5 yd. pass from Russell Wilson (Blair Walsh kick)	1:57	NFC 52–21
4th quarter
NFC – Blair Walsh 26 yd. Field Goal	14:42	NFC 55–21
AFC – A. J. Green 4 yd. pass from Andrew Luck (Phil Dawson kick)	11:40	NFC 55–28
NFC – Jerome Felton 3 yd. run (Blair Walsh kick)	7:59	NFC 62–28
AFC – A. J. Green 49 yd. pass from Andrew Luck (Phil Dawson kick)	6:02	NFC 62–35

== AFC rosters ==
The following players were selected to represent the AFC:

=== Offense ===
Position	Starter(s)	Reserve(s)	Alternate(s)
Quarterback	18 Peyton Manning, Denver	12 Tom Brady, New England^{[b]} 8 Matt Schaub, Houston	12 Andrew Luck, Indianapolis^{[a]}
Running back	23 Arian Foster, Houston	25 Jamaal Charles, Kansas City; 27 Ray Rice, Baltimore^{[e]}	28 C. J. Spiller, Buffalo^{[a]}
Fullback	44 Vonta Leach, Baltimore^{[e]}		45 Marcel Reece, Oakland^{[a]}
Wide receiver	18 A. J. Green, Cincinnati; 80 Andre Johnson, Houston	87 Reggie Wayne, Indianapolis; 83 Wes Welker, New England^{[b]}	88 Demaryius Thomas, Denver^{[a]}
Tight end	87 Rob Gronkowski, New England ^{[b]}	83 Heath Miller, Pittsburgh ^{[b]}	84 Jermaine Gresham, Cincinnati ^{[a]} 81 Owen Daniels, Houston ^{[a]}
Offensive tackle	73 Joe Thomas, Cleveland; 76 Duane Brown, Houston	78 Ryan Clady, Denver ^{[b]}	77 Andrew Whitworth, Cincinnati ^{[a]}
Offensive guard	70 Logan Mankins, New England^{[b]} 73 Marshal Yanda, Baltimore^{[e]}	74 Wade Smith, Houston	68 Richie Incognito, Miami^{[a]} 68 Zane Beadles, Denver ^{[a]}
Center	53 Maurkice Pouncey, Pittsburgh	55 Chris Myers, Houston	

=== Defense ===
Position	Starter(s)	Reserve(s)	Alternate(s)
Defensive end	99 J. J. Watt, Houston; 91 Cameron Wake, Miami	92 Elvis Dumervil, Denver	
Defensive tackle	97 Geno Atkins, Cincinnati; 75 Vince Wilfork, New England ^{[b]}	92 Haloti Ngata, Baltimore ^{[e]}	95 Kyle Williams, Buffalo ^{[a]} 94 Randy Starks, Miami ^{[a]}
Outside linebacker	58 Von Miller, Denver ^{[b]} 91 Tamba Hali, Kansas City	98 Robert Mathis, Indianapolis	50 Justin Houston, Kansas City ^{[a]}
Inside linebacker	51 Jerod Mayo, New England	56 Derrick Johnson, Kansas City	
Cornerback	24 Champ Bailey, Denver; 24 Johnathan Joseph, Houston	31 Antonio Cromartie, N.Y. Jets	
Free safety	20 Ed Reed, Baltimore^{[e]}	30 LaRon Landry, N.Y. Jets	31 Jairus Byrd, Buffalo^{[a]}^{[f]}
Strong safety	29 Eric Berry, Kansas City		

=== Special teams ===
Position	Starter(s)	Reserve(s)	Alternate(s)
Punter	2 Dustin Colquitt, Kansas City		
Placekicker	4 Phil Dawson, Cleveland		
Return specialist	12 Jacoby Jones, Baltimore^{[e]}		16 Josh Cribbs, Cleveland ^{[a]}
Special teamer	18 Matthew Slater, New England		
Long snapper	92 John Denney, Miami		

== NFC rosters ==
The following players were selected to represent the NFC:

=== Offense ===
Position	Starter(s)	Reserve(s)	Alternate(s)
Quarterback	12 Aaron Rodgers^{[b]}, Green Bay	2 Matt Ryan, Atlanta^{[b]} 10 Robert Griffin III, Washington^{[b]}	9 Drew Brees, New Orleans^{[a]} 10 Eli Manning, N. Y. Giants^{[a]} 3 Russell Wilson, Seattle^{[a]}
Running back	28 Adrian Peterson, Minnesota	24 Marshawn Lynch, Seattle; 21 Frank Gore, San Francisco^{[e]}	22 Doug Martin, Tampa Bay^{[a]}
Fullback	42 Jerome Felton, Minnesota		
Wide receiver	81 Calvin Johnson, Detroit^{[b]} 15 Brandon Marshall, Chicago^{[b]}	11 Julio Jones, Atlanta; 80 Victor Cruz, N.Y. Giants	83 Vincent Jackson, Tampa Bay^{[a]} 11 Larry Fitzgerald, Arizona^{[a]}
Tight end	88 Tony Gonzalez, Atlanta^{[b]}	82 Jason Witten, Dallas	82 Kyle Rudolph, Minnesota^{[a]}^{[g]}
Offensive tackle	74 Joe Staley, San Francisco^{[e]} 76 Russell Okung, Seattle	71 Trent Williams, Washington^{[b]}	74 Jermon Bushrod, New Orleans^{[a]} 75 Matt Kalil, Minnesota^{[a]}
Offensive guard	77 Mike Iupati, San Francisco^{[e]} 73 Jahri Evans, New Orleans	76 Chris Snee, N.Y. Giants	71 Josh Sitton, Green Bay^{[a]}
Center	60 Max Unger, Seattle	63 Jeff Saturday, Green Bay	

=== Defense ===
Position	Starter(s)	Reserve(s)	Alternate(s)
Defensive end	90 Jason Pierre-Paul, N.Y. Giants; 90 Julius Peppers, Chicago	69 Jared Allen, Minnesota	
Defensive tackle	94 Justin Smith, San Francisco^{[e]} 69 Henry Melton, Chicago	93 Gerald McCoy, Tampa Bay	90 Ndamukong Suh, Detroit ^{[a]}
Outside linebacker	99 Aldon Smith, San Francisco^{[e]} 94 DeMarcus Ware, Dallas ^{[b]}	52 Clay Matthews, Green Bay ^{[b]}	52 Chad Greenway, Minnesota ^{[a]} 93 Anthony Spencer, Dallas ^{[a]} 91 Ryan Kerrigan, Washington^{[a]}
Inside linebacker	52 Patrick Willis, San Francisco^{[e]}	53 NaVorro Bowman, San Francisco^{[e]}	58 Daryl Washington, Arizona ^{[a]} 59 London Fletcher, Washington ^{[a]}
Cornerback	33 Charles Tillman, Chicago; 26 Tim Jennings, Chicago	21 Patrick Peterson, Arizona	
Free safety	38 Dashon Goldson, San Francisco^{[e]}	29 Earl Thomas, Seattle	28 Thomas DeCoud, Atlanta ^{[a]}
Strong safety	31 Donte Whitner, San Francisco^{[e]}		25 William Moore, Atlanta ^{[a]}

=== Special teams ===
Position	Starter(s)	Reserve(s)	Alternate(s)
Punter	6 Thomas Morstead, New Orleans		
Placekicker	3 Blair Walsh, Minnesota		
Kick returner	33 Leon Washington, Seattle		
Special teamer	97 Lorenzo Alexander, Washington		
Long snapper	48 Don Muhlbach, Detroit		

Indicating he would retire after the Pro Bowl, NFC center Jeff Saturday treated the game as a testimonial match and crossed over to the AFC side for one play in order to reunite with quarterback Peyton Manning; the two had played together as members of the Indianapolis Colts for thirteen seasons.

Notes:

bold player who participated in game
^{a} Replacement selection due to injury or vacancy
^{b} Injured player; selected but will not play
^{c} Replacement starter; selected as reserve
^{e} Selected but did not play because his team advanced to Super Bowl XLVII (see Pro Bowl "Player Selection" section)
^{f} Ryan Clark was the first alternate, but declined due to injury
^{g} Jimmy Graham was the first alternate, but declined due to injury

== Number of selections per team ==
American Football Conference
Team	Selections
Houston Texans	10
Denver Broncos	7
New England Patriots	7
Baltimore Ravens	6
Kansas City Chiefs	6
Cincinnati Bengals	4
Miami Dolphins	4
Buffalo Bills	3
Cleveland Browns	3
Indianapolis Colts	3
Pittsburgh Steelers	3
New York Jets	2
Oakland Raiders	1
Jacksonville Jaguars	0
San Diego Chargers	0
Tennessee Titans	0

National Football Conference
Team	Selections
San Francisco 49ers	9
Minnesota Vikings	7
Seattle Seahawks	6
Atlanta Falcons	5
Chicago Bears	5
Washington Redskins	5
Green Bay Packers	4
New Orleans Saints	4
New York Giants	4
Arizona Cardinals	3
Dallas Cowboys	3
Detroit Lions	3
Tampa Bay Buccaneers	3
Carolina Panthers	0
Philadelphia Eagles	0
St. Louis Rams	0

== Broadcasting ==
The game was televised nationally by NBC after Super Bowl XLVII broadcaster CBS declined to exercise their right to air the game, even though that network was using the game as part of the plot of an episode of Hawaii Five-0 to be aired three weeks later. This was the second of three consecutive years that NBC carried the game, since CBS also decided not to broadcast the 2013 Pro Bowl and Fox would later decline to carry the 2014 game.
