= 2016 Pro Bowl =

National Football League all-star game

2016 NFL Pro Bowl
Team Irvin	Team Rice
49	27
Head coach: Winston Moss (Green Bay Packers)	Head coach: Andy Reid (Kansas City Chiefs)
	1	2	3	4	Total
Team Irvin	14	14	14	7	49
Team Rice	7	7	7	6	27
- Date: January 31, 2016
- Stadium: Aloha Stadium; Honolulu, Hawaii
- Offensive MVP: Russell Wilson (Seattle Seahawks)
- Defensive MVP: Michael Bennett (Seattle Seahawks)
- Referee: Pete Morelli
- Attendance: 50,000

Ceremonies
- National anthem: Captain Skye Martin, USMC
- Coin toss: ADM Scott H. Swift, USN; LtGen John A. Toolan, USMC

TV in the United States
- Network: ESPN
- Announcers: Mike Tirico (play-by-play); Jon Gruden (analyst); Lisa Salters (sideline reporter)
- Nielsen ratings: 2.8 (7.987 million)

The 2016 Pro Bowl (branded as the 2016 Pro Bowl presented by USAA for sponsorship reasons) was the National Football League's all-star game for the 2015 season, which was played at Aloha Stadium in Honolulu, Hawaii on January 31, 2016. This was the last time the Pro Bowl was held in Hawaii.

Andy Reid of the Kansas City Chiefs and Mike McCarthy of the Green Bay Packers were selected to coach the teams due to their teams being the highest seeded teams from each conference to lose in the Divisional Round of 2015–16 NFL playoffs, which has been the convention since the 2010 Pro Bowl. On January 27, Mike McCarthy announced that he would not be coaching the Pro Bowl due to an illness and also announced that assistant head coach Winston Moss would take over head coaching duties. This was also the sixth consecutive year that the Pro Bowl took place prior to the Super Bowl. At the Pro Bowl Draft, the Chiefs' coaching staff was assigned to Team Rice, and the Packers' coaching staff was assigned to Team Irvin.

The game continued the fantasy draft format that debuted with the 2014 Pro Bowl. The two teams were to be drafted and captained by two Hall of Famers, Jerry Rice (winning 2014 Pro Bowl captain) and Michael Irvin (winning 2015 Pro Bowl captain). Darren Woodson and Eric Davis served as defensive co-captains for Irvin and Rice respectively, in both cases reuniting two former teammates (Irvin and Woodson were teammates on the Dallas Cowboys from 1992 to 1999, while Rice and Davis played together with the San Francisco 49ers from 1990 to 1995). The Fantasy draft was held January 27 at 7:30 P.M. EST on ESPN2 at Wheeler Army Airfield in Wahiawa, Hawaii as part of an extension to the NFL's military appreciation campaign.

== Game format ==
The game format was nearly the same for 2016 as it had been in 2015. The previous year's experimental rule of kicking the point after touchdown from the 15-yard line became a permanent rule. The goal posts remained at their normal 18-foot width in 2016, as compared to the narrower 14-foot width from the 2015 Pro Bowl.

- Two former players drafted players onto the teams. Each was assisted by two player captains and one NFL.com fantasy football champion. Michael Irvin was assisted by player captains Geno Atkins and Devonta Freeman, while Jerry Rice was assisted by player captains Odell Beckham Jr. and Aaron Donald.
- Forty-three players were assigned to each team, down from 44 in 2015 (a regular game-day active roster has 46).
- A two-minute warning was given in the first and third quarters (as well as in the second and fourth quarters), and the ball changed hands after each quarter.
- The coin toss determined which team was awarded possession first. There were no kickoffs; the ball was placed on the 25-yard line at the start of each quarter and after scoring plays.
- Defenses were now permitted to play cover two and press coverage. Prior to 2014, only man coverage was allowed, except for goal line situations.
- Beginning at the two-minute mark of every quarter, if the offense did not gain at least one yard, the clock stopped as if the play were an incomplete pass.
- The game clock started after an incomplete pass on the signal of the referee, except inside the last two minutes of the first half and the last five minutes of the second half.
- A 35-second/25-second play clock was used instead of the usual 40-second/25-second clock.
- The game clock did not stop on quarterback sacks outside the final two minutes of the game. Formerly, the clock stopped on these situations outside the final two minutes of the second and fourth quarters.

== Summary ==
=== Starting lineups ===
Offense
Rice	Position	Irvin
Odell Beckham Jr.	WR	Julio Jones
Joe Thomas	OT	Andrew Whitworth
Josh Sitton	OG	Marshal Yanda
Nick Mangold	C	Alex Mack
Richie Incognito	OG	Zack Martin
Joe Staley	OT	Tyron Smith
Travis Kelce	TE	Tyler Eifert
Jarvis Landry	WR	A. J. Green
Eli Manning	QB	Russell Wilson
Adrian Peterson	RB	Devonta Freeman
John Kuhn	FB	Patrick DiMarco

Defense
Rice	Position	Irvin
Everson Griffen	DE	Michael Bennett
Aaron Donald	DT	Geno Atkins
Gerald McCoy	DT	Calais Campbell
Khalil Mack	DE	Ezekiel Ansah
Julius Peppers	OLB	Sean Lee
Bobby Wagner	ILB	Derrick Johnson
Tamba Hali	OLB	Anthony Barr
Vontae Davis	CB	Richard Sherman
Jason Verrett	CB	Adam Jones
Charles Woodson	FS	Malcolm Jenkins
Eric Berry	SS	Reshad Jones

=== Box Score ===
2016 Pro Bowl: Team Irvin vs. Team Rice

Quarter	1	2	3	4	Total
Team Irvin	14	14	14	7	49
Team Rice	7	7	7	6	27

at Aloha Stadium in Honolulu, Hawaii

- Date: January 31, 2016
- Game time: 7:00 p.m. EST / 2:00 p.m. HST
- Game weather: 83 °F (28 °C), sunny
- Game attendance: 50,000
- Referee: Pete Morelli
- TV announcers (ESPN): Mike Tirico, Jon Gruden, and Lisa Salters
- Recap, Gamebook

Game information

First quarter

- RIC – 9:31 T. Kelce 4 yd. pass from E. Manning (J. Brown kick) (Drive: 10–75, 5:29) RIC 7–0
- IRV – 7:59 J. Jones 14 yd. pass from R. Wilson (pass failed) (Drive: 4–75, 1:32) RIC 7–6
- IRV – 3:40 D. Freeman 6 yd. pass from R. Wilson (R. Wilson-J. Jones pass) (Drive: 6–28, 2:53) IRV 14–7

Second quarter

- IRV – 12:32 T. Gurley 10 yd. pass from R. Wilson (D. Bailey kick) (Drive: 5–75, 2:28) IRV 21–7
- RIC – 3:24 T. Kelce 10 yd. pass from D. Carr (J. Brown kick) (Drive: 7–51, 4:26) IRV 21–14
- IRV – 0:32 D. Sproles 2 yd. pass from T. Bridgewater (D. Bailey kick) (Drive: 7–80, 1:52) IRV 28–14

Third quarter

- RIC – 8:55 D. Martin 3 yd. run (J. Brown kick) (Drive: 10–75, 6:05) IRV 28–21
- IRV – 6:48 A. Robinson 50 yd. pass from T. Bridgewater (D. Bailey kick) (Drive: 4–75, 2:07) IRV 35–21
- IRV – 1:51 D. Walker 53 yd. pass from J. Winston (D. Bailey kick) (Drive: 4–68, 1:33) IRV 42–21

Fourth quarter

- IRV – 7:50 D. Hopkins 7 yd. pass from J. Winston (D. Bailey kick) (Drive: 12–75, 7:10) IRV 49–21
- RIC – 6:05 J. Landry 31 yd. pass from T. Taylor (pass failed) (Drive: 5–75, 1:45) IRV 49–27

Top passers

- RIC – Derek Carr – 14/25, 198 yards, TD, 2 Int
- IRV – Russell Wilson – 8/12, 164 yards, 3 TD

Top rushers

- RIC – Doug Martin – 7 rushes, 20 yards, TD
- IRV – Latavius Murray – 9 rushes, 42 yards

Top receivers

- RIC – Travis Kelce – 5 rec, 91 yards, 2 TD
- IRV – Allen Robinson – 2 rec, 105 yards, TD

Top Tacklers

- RIC – Bobby Wagner – 9 tackles
- IRV – Derrick Johnson – 6 tackles

== Rosters ==
=== Team Rice ===
Team Rice
Quarterbacks: 4 Derek Carr ^{[a]}; 10 Eli Manning ^{[a]}; 5 Tyrod Taylor ^{[a]}; Running Backs: 33 Chris Ivory ^{[a]}; 22 Doug Martin; 28 Adrian Peterson; 30 John Kuhn FB ^{[a]}; Wide Receivers: 13 Odell Beckham Jr. (C); 89 Amari Cooper ^{[a]}; 13 T. Y. Hilton ^{[a]}; 14 Jarvis Landry ^{[a]}; Tight Ends: 82 Gary Barnidge ^{[a]}; 87 Travis Kelce; Offensive tackles: 75 Kyle Long ^{[a]}; 74 Joe Staley; 73 Joe Thomas	Offensive guards: 64 Richie Incognito ^{[a]}; 70 Logan Mankins ^{[a]}; 71 Josh Sitton; Centers: 74 Nick Mangold ^{[a]}; 70 Eric Wood ^{[a]}; Defensive ends: 97 Everson Griffen ^{[a]}; 94 Cameron Jordan ^{[a]}; 52 Khalil Mack; Defensive tackles: 91 Fletcher Cox; 99 Aaron Donald; 93 Gerald McCoy; Outside linebackers: 58 Elvis Dumervil ^{[a]}; 91 Tamba Hali; 56 Julius Peppers ^{[a]}; Inside linebackers: 52 Clay Matthews III; 54 Bobby Wagner	Cornerbacks: 21 Vontae Davis ^{[a]}; 21 Brent Grimes ^{[a]}; 22 Marcus Peters; 22 Jason Verrett ^{[a]}; Safeties: 29 Mike Adams ^{[a]}; 29 Eric Berry; 24 Charles Woodson ^{[a]}; Punter: 6 Johnny Hekker; Placekicker: 3 Josh Brown ^{[a]}; Return specialist: 16 Tyler Lockett; Long snapper: 46 Morgan Cox; Special Teamer: 30 Cedric Peerman ^{[a]}

=== Team Irvin ===
Team Irvin
Quarterbacks: 5 Teddy Bridgewater ^{[a]}; 3 Russell Wilson; 3 Jameis Winston ^{[a]}; Running Backs: 24 Devonta Freeman (C); 30 Todd Gurley; 28 Latavius Murray ^{[a]}; 42 Patrick DiMarco FB ^{[a]}; Wide Receivers: 18 A. J. Green; 10 DeAndre Hopkins; 11 Julio Jones; 15 Allen Robinson ^{[a]}; Tight Ends: 85 Tyler Eifert; 82 Delanie Walker ^{[a]}; Offensive tackles: 76 Branden Albert ^{[a]}; 77 Tyron Smith; 77 Andrew Whitworth	Offensive guards: 66 David DeCastro; 70 Zack Martin; 73 Marshal Yanda; Centers: 72 Travis Frederick; 55 Alex Mack; Defensive Ends: 94 Ezekiel Ansah; 72 Michael Bennett; 96 Carlos Dunlap ^{[a]}; Defensive tackles: 97 Geno Atkins (C); 93 Calais Campbell; 99 Jurrell Casey ^{[a]}; Outside Linebackers: 55 Anthony Barr ^{[a]}; 54 Lavonte David ^{[a]}; 50 Sean Lee ^{[a]}; Inside Linebackers: 53 NaVorro Bowman; 56 Derrick Johnson ^{[a]}	Cornerbacks: 24 Adam Jones ^{[a]}; 41 Dominique Rodgers-Cromartie ^{[a]}; 25 Richard Sherman; 21 Desmond Trufant ^{[a]}; Safeties: 27 Malcolm Jenkins; 20 Reshad Jones ^{[a]}; 22 Harrison Smith ^{[a]}; Punter: 4 Sam Koch; Placekicker: 5 Dan Bailey; Return Specialist: 43 Darren Sproles; Long snapper: 46 Jon Weeks; Special Teamer: 28 Justin Bethel

=== Selected but did not participate ===
Selected but did not participate
Quarterbacks: 12 Tom Brady ^{[b]}; 1 Cam Newton ^{[c]}; 12 Aaron Rodgers ^{[b]}; 3 Carson Palmer ^{[b]}; 7 Ben Roethlisberger ^{[b]}; Running Backs: 25 LeSean McCoy ^{[b]}; 28 Jonathan Stewart ^{[c]}; Fullbacks: 45 Marcel Reece ^{[b]}; 35 Mike Tolbert ^{[c]}; Wide Receivers: 84 Antonio Brown ^{[b]}; 11 Larry Fitzgerald ^{[b]}; 81 Calvin Johnson ^{[b]}; 15 Brandon Marshall ^{[b]}; Tight Ends: 87 Rob Gronkowski ^{[b]}; 88 Greg Olsen ^{[c]}	Offensive tackles: 71 Jason Peters ^{[b]}; 71 Trent Williams ^{[b]}; Offensive guards: 76 Mike Iupati ^{[b]}; 70 Trai Turner ^{[c]}; Centers: 67 Ryan Kalil ^{[c]}; 51 Mike Pouncey ^{[b]}; Defensive Ends: 95 Chandler Jones ^{[b]}; 99 J. J. Watt ^{[b]}; 96 Muhammad Wilkerson ^{[b]}; Defensive tackles: 99 Kawann Short ^{[c]}; Linebackers: 91 Jamie Collins ^{[b]}; 58 Thomas Davis ^{[c]}; 50 Justin Houston ^{[b]}; 59 Luke Kuechly ^{[c]}; 58 Von Miller ^{[c]}; 94 DeMarcus Ware ^{[c]}	Cornerbacks: 21 Malcolm Butler ^{[b]}; 25 Chris Harris, Jr. ^{[c]}; 24 Josh Norman ^{[c]}; 21 Patrick Peterson ^{[b]}; 24 Darrelle Revis ^{[b]}; 21 Aqib Talib ^{[c]}; Safeties: 31 Kam Chancellor ^{[b]}; 32 Tyrann Mathieu ^{[b]}; 20 Reggie Nelson ^{[b]}; 29 Earl Thomas ^{[b]}; Placekickers: 3 Stephen Gostkowski ^{[b]}; Special Teamers: 18 Matthew Slater ^{[b]}

Notes: Players must have accepted their invitations as alternates to be listed; those who declined, such as Philip Rivers, are not considered Pro Bowlers.

(C) signifies the player was selected as a captain
^{a} Replacement selection due to injury or vacancy
^{b} Injured/suspended player; selected but did not participate
^{c} Selected but did not play because his team advanced to Super Bowl 50 (see Pro Bowl "Player Selection" section)

- Source for selections and replacements

== Number of selections per team ==
American Football Conference
Team	Selections
Cincinnati Bengals	8
New England Patriots	7
Kansas City Chiefs	6
Oakland Raiders	6
Miami Dolphins	5
New York Jets	5
Baltimore Ravens	4
Buffalo Bills	4
Denver Broncos	4
Cleveland Browns	3
Houston Texans	3
Indianapolis Colts	3
Pittsburgh Steelers	3
Tennessee Titans	2
San Diego Chargers	1
Jacksonville Jaguars	1

National Football Conference
Team	Selections
Carolina Panthers	10
Arizona Cardinals	7
Seattle Seahawks	7
Dallas Cowboys	5
Green Bay Packers	5
Minnesota Vikings	5
Tampa Bay Buccaneers	5
Atlanta Falcons	4
New York Giants	4
Philadelphia Eagles	4
St. Louis Rams	3
Detroit Lions	2
San Francisco 49ers	2
Chicago Bears	1
New Orleans Saints	1
Washington Redskins	1

== Broadcasting ==
The game was televised nationally by ESPN, which has the exclusive broadcast rights to the Pro Bowl through to 2022.

Westwood One radio broadcast the game nationally, with Kevin Kugler on play-by-play, Tony Boselli on color commentary, and Laura Okmin on the sidelines.
