= Justin Houston =

American football player (born 1989)

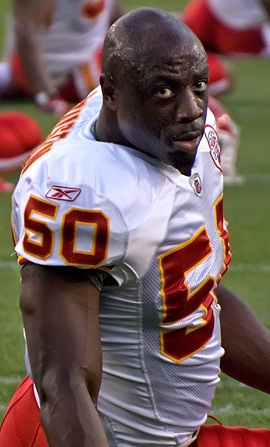
- Houston with the Kansas City Chiefs in 2011

No. 50, 99, 52
- Position: Linebacker

Personal information
- Born: January 21, 1989 (age 37); Statesboro, Georgia, U.S.
- Listed height: 6 ft 3 in (1.91 m)
- Listed weight: 270 lb (122 kg)

Career information
- High school: Statesboro
- College: Georgia (2007–2010)
- NFL draft: 2011: 3rd round, 70th overall pick

Career history
- Kansas City Chiefs (2011–2018); Indianapolis Colts (2019–2020); Baltimore Ravens (2021–2022); Carolina Panthers (2023); Miami Dolphins (2023)

Awards and highlights
- First-team All-Pro (2014); 4× Pro Bowl (2012–2015); Deacon Jones Award (2014); First-team All-American (2010); First-team All-SEC (2010); Second-team All-SEC (2009); NFL records: Most career safeties: 4 (tied); Most safeties in a season: 2 (tied)

Career NFL statistics
- Total tackles: 515
- Sacks: 112.0
- Forced fumbles: 19
- Fumble recoveries: 14
- Pass deflections: 35
- Interceptions: 5
- Defensive touchdowns: 2
- Stats at Pro Football Reference

Justin Donovan Houston (born January 21, 1989) is an American former professional football linebacker. He played college football for the Georgia Bulldogs, earning first-team All-American honors in 2010. Houston was selected by the Kansas City Chiefs in the third round of the 2011 NFL draft. A four-time Pro Bowl selection, he was also named to the All-Pro team in 2014. He also played for the Indianapolis Colts, Baltimore Ravens, Carolina Panthers and Miami Dolphins.

== Early life ==
Houston attended Class AAAA Statesboro High School in Statesboro, Georgia, where he was a two-time All-Region selection and All-State honorable mention. He also played in three State Championships in 2003, 2004, and 2005. Statesboro won the State Championship in 2005, defeating Northside High School. He was teammates with fellow Georgia recruit DeAngelo Tyson.

Regarded as a four-star recruit by Rivals.com, Houston was listed as the #11 weakside defensive end in the class of 2007.

== College career ==
As a sophomore at the University of Georgia in 2009, Houston was a second-team All-SEC selection after recording 7.5 sacks. As a junior, Houston recorded 10 sacks, leading all linebackers in the SEC, and only second to Auburn's Nick Fairley who had 11.5 sacks as part of the defensive line, and was a first-team All-SEC selection and an All-American.

== Professional career ==
=== Pre-draft ===
On January 15, 2011, Houston announced his decision to forgo his senior season and enter the 2011 NFL draft. He attended the NFL Combine and performed all of the combine and positional drills. On April 26, 2011, it was reported that Houston had failed a drug test for marijuana that was administered at the NFL Combine. On March 22, 2011, Houston attended Georgia's pro day and opted to run the 40-yard dash (4.61s), 20-yard dash (2.66s), and 10-yard dash (1.61s). He improved his times in all three drills and also performed positional drills during his pro day.

External videos
- Justin Houston’s NFL Combine Workout
- 2011 NFL Draft Profile: Justin Houston

Houston attended pre-draft visits with multiple teams, including the Baltimore Ravens, Kansas City Chiefs, New York Giants, New York Jets, San Francisco 49ers, Seattle Seahawks, and Tampa Bay Buccaneers. At the conclusion of the pre-draft process, Houston was projected to be a second-round pick by NFL draft experts and scouts. He received a late first-round projection by NFL draft experts prior to his failed drug test. Houston was ranked as the fourth-best linebacker prospect in the draft by NFL analyst Gil Brandt and Sports Illustrated and was ranked as the fifth best linebacker by DraftScout.com.

Pre-draft measurables
Height	Weight	Arm length	Hand span	Wingspan	40-yard dash	10-yard split	20-yard split	20-yard shuttle	Three-cone drill	Vertical jump	Broad jump	Bench press
6 ft 2 7/8 in (1.90 m)	270 lb (122 kg)	34 1/2 in (0.88 m)	10 7/8 in (0.28 m)	6 ft 9 5/8 in (2.07 m)	4.61 s	1.61 s	2.66 s	4.37 s	6.95 s	36.5 in (0.93 m)	10 ft 5 in (3.18 m)	30 reps
All values from NFL Combine/Pro Day

=== Kansas City Chiefs ===
==== 2011 ====
The Kansas City Chiefs selected Houston in the third round (70th overall) of the 2011 NFL draft. He dropped to the third round after initially being projected as a late first-round pick due to a failed drug test at the NFL Combine. Houston was the ninth linebacker drafted in 2011.

On April 4, 2011, the Kansas City Chiefs signed Houston to a four-year, $2.78 million contract that includes a signing bonus of $1.04 million. During training camp, Houston competed against veterans Andy Studebaker and Mike Vrabel to be a starting outside linebacker. Head coach Todd Haley named Houston a backup outside linebacker to begin the regular season, behind starting outside linebackers Andy Studebaker and Tamba Hali.

Houston made his NFL debut and first NFL start in the season-opener against the Buffalo Bills and made two solo tackles during their 41–7 loss. On September 13, 2011, Houston was promoted to starting outside linebacker after surpassing Andy Studebaker on the Chiefs’ depth chart. On December 4, 2011, Houston collected a season-high seven solo tackles and made a season-high three sacks on Bears’ quarterback Caleb Hanie during a 10–3 victory at the Chicago Bears in Week 13. Houston sacked Caleb Hanie for a nine-yard loss during the second quarter to mark the first of his career. On December 13, 2011, the Kansas City Chiefs fired head coach Todd Haley after they fell to a 5–8 record. Defensive coordinator Romeo Crennel was named the interim head coach for the remainder of the season. He finished his rookie season with 56 combined tackles (46 solo), 5.5 sacks, four pass deflections, and a forced fumble in 16 games and ten starts. Houston received the Mack Lee Hill Award after teammates and coaches determined he was the best rookie on the Kansas City Chiefs in 2011.

==== 2012 ====
On January 9, 2012, the Chiefs officially promoted Romeo Crennel to head coach. Houston entered training camp slated as a starting weakside linebacker. Head coach Romeo Crennel named Houston and Tamba Hali the starting outside linebackers to begin the season. They started alongside inside linebackers Derrick Johnson and Jovan Belcher.

On September 23, 2012, Houston made four combined tackles, a season-high three sacks, deflected two passes, and earned the first safety of his career during a 27–24 comeback overtime victory at the New Orleans Saints in Week 3. Houston sacked Saints’ quarterback Drew Brees for a seven-yard loss in the end zone for a safety during the fourth quarter. The play was challenged by the Saints and was upheld as the Kansas City Chiefs came back from an 18-point deficit. On October 14, 2012, Houston recorded three combined tackles, deflected a pass, and made his first career interception as the Chiefs lost 38–10 at the Tampa Bay Buccaneers in Week 6. Houston intercepted a pass by Buccaneers’ quarterback Josh Freeman, that was intended for tight end Dallas Clark, and returned it for a 45-yard gain during the first quarter. In Week 17, he collected a season-high nine combined tackles in a 38–3 loss at the Denver Broncos. On December 31, 2012, the Kansas City Chiefs fired head coach Romeo Crennel after they finished the season with a 2–14 record. Houston started in all 16 games, recording 66 combined tackles (53 solo), ten sacks, six pass deflections, one forced fumble, one interception, and a safety. On January 22, 2013, it was announced that Houston was selected to play in the 2013 Pro Bowl as a late replacement for Von Miller who was unable to play due to an injury. This became Houston's first Pro Bowl selection of his career as he joined fellow linebackers Derrick Johnson and Tamba Hali. He was ranked 49th by his fellow players on the NFL Top 100 Players of 2013.

==== 2013 ====
On January 4, 2013, the Chiefs hired former Philadelphia Eagles' head coach Andy Reid to take over as head coach. On May 30, 2013, Houston was named the 49th best player in the NFL according to the NFL Top 100 Players of 2013 ranking, which is generated by the players. Defensive coordinator Bob Sutton retained Houston and Tamba Hali as the starting outside linebackers. They started alongside inside linebackers Derrick Johnson and Akeem Jordan.

On September 19, 2013, Houston made seven combined tackles, deflected three passes, and made a season-high 4.5 sacks on Eagles’ quarterback Michael Vick during a 26–16 victory at the Philadelphia Eagles in Week 3. In Week 11, he collected a season-high ten combined tackles (nine solo) and deflected a pass as the Chiefs lost 27–17 at the Denver Broncos. In Week 12, Houston sustained an elbow injury during a 41–38 loss against the San Diego Chargers and remained inactive for the last five games of the season (Weeks 13–17). On December 27, 2013, it was announced that Houston was selected to play in the 2014 Pro Bowl. He finished the 2013 NFL season with 44 combined tackles (40 solo), 11 sacks, four pass deflections, and a forced fumble in 11 games and 11 starts.

The Chiefs finished second in the AFC West with an 11–5 record and earned a playoff berth. On January 4, 2014, Houston started in his first career playoff game and recorded four combined tackles, deflected a pass, and made one sack during a 45–44 loss at the Indianapolis Colts in the AFC Wildcard Game. He was ranked 57th by his fellow players on the NFL Top 100 Players of 2014.

==== 2014 ====
Houston and Tamba Hali returned as the starting outside linebackers in 2014 and started alongside inside linebackers Derrick Johnson and Josh Mauga. On October 26, 2014, Houston recorded five solo tackles and made a season-high three sacks on Rams’ quarterback Austin Davis during a 34–7 win against the St. Louis Rams in Week 8. In Week 13, Houston collected a season-high eight combined tackles, deflected two passes, and made one sack in a 29–16 loss against the Denver Broncos. On December 23, 2014, Houston was voted to the 2015 Pro Bowl, which became his third consecutive Pro Bowl selection. Houston started in all 16 games in 2014 and recorded a career-high 69 combined tackles (60 solo), 22 sacks, five pass deflections, and four forced fumbles. Houston led the NFL with 22 sacks, which nearly broke Michael Strahan's single season sack record of 22.5. He was ranked 27th by his fellow players on the NFL Top 100 Players of 2015.

==== 2015 ====
On March 3, 2015, the Chiefs placed a non-exclusive franchise tag, worth $13.195 million, on Houston, meaning that he could negotiate with other teams, but the Chiefs had the right to match any offer, or receive two first-round picks as compensation. On July 15, 2015, hours before the deadline for long-term deals on franchise players, the Chiefs signed Houston to a six-year contract worth $101 million. The deal included $52.5 million in guarantees. He started 11 games in 2015 before suffering a knee injury in Week 12 and missed the final five games of the regular season. The injury was believed to just be a hyperextension; unfortunately, it required surgery on the ACL. Despite the injury, Houston was named to his fourth straight Pro Bowl and was ranked 26th by his fellow players on the NFL Top 100 Players of 2016.

==== 2016 ====
Houston began the season on the physically unable to perform list after having ACL surgery in February. One month after the regular season started, he was activated for a three-week practice period. At the end of the period, the Chiefs had to activate him or place him on injured reserve. At the end of the period, the Chiefs chose to activate him. The first game after he was activated to the active roster, the Chiefs placed him on their inactive list for the game. Houston finally saw his first game action against the Tampa Bay Buccaneers in Week 11, easing into things with just two tackles. He then turned in a dominant performance against the Denver Broncos in Week 12, finishing the game with 10 tackles and three sacks, one of which forced a fumble and resulted in a safety. He finished the 2016 season only playing five games, recording 21 tackles and four sacks. Despite missing most of the season, Houston was still ranked 76th by his peers on the NFL Top 100 Players of 2017.

==== 2017 ====
In Week 1, against the Patriots, Houston had two sacks in the 42–27 win. In Week 8, against the Broncos, he had two sacks in the 29–19 win. He had 9.5 sacks, 59 total tackles (46 solo), five passes defended, and one fumble recovery in the 2017 season. He had a sack in the Chiefs' 22–21 loss to the Titans in the Wild Card Round.

==== 2018 ====
Houston finished the 2018 regular season with 37 tackles, nine sacks, five forced fumbles, and one interception, playing 12 games.

On March 10, 2019, Houston was released by the Chiefs after eight seasons. The Chiefs attempted to trade Houston, but were unable to find someone willing to make the trade.

=== Indianapolis Colts ===
==== 2019 ====
On March 21, 2019, Houston signed a two-year, $24 million contract with the Indianapolis Colts.

Houston made his Colts debut in the season-opener against the Los Angeles Chargers. In the game, Houston made 4 tackles and sacked Philip Rivers once in the 24–30 overtime loss. In Week 5, against his former team, Kansas City Chiefs, Houston recorded 4 tackles, two tackles for losses, and one sack, earning him AFC Defensive Player of the Week. In week 7 against the Houston Texans, Houston recorded two sacks on Deshaun Watson in the 30–23 win. In week 9 against the Pittsburgh Steelers, Houston recorded a sack on Mason Rudolph in the end zone, resulting in a safety, and recovered a fumble forced by Marvell Tell on running back Jaylen Samuels in the 26–24 loss. He finished the 2019 season with 11 sacks, 44 total tackles (33 solo), two forced fumbles, and three fumble recoveries.

==== 2020 ====
After the Colts acquired DeForest Buckner in a trade with the San Francisco 49ers, Houston reverted to #50, his number with the Kansas City Chiefs. In Week 1 against the Jacksonville Jaguars, Houston recorded his first sack of the season on Gardner Minshew during the 27–20 loss. In Week 13 against the Houston Texans, Houston sacked Deshaun Watson three times during the 26–20 win. In the 2020 season, he had eight sacks, 25 total tackles (19 solo), one forced fumble, and two fumble recoveries.

=== Baltimore Ravens ===
==== 2021 ====
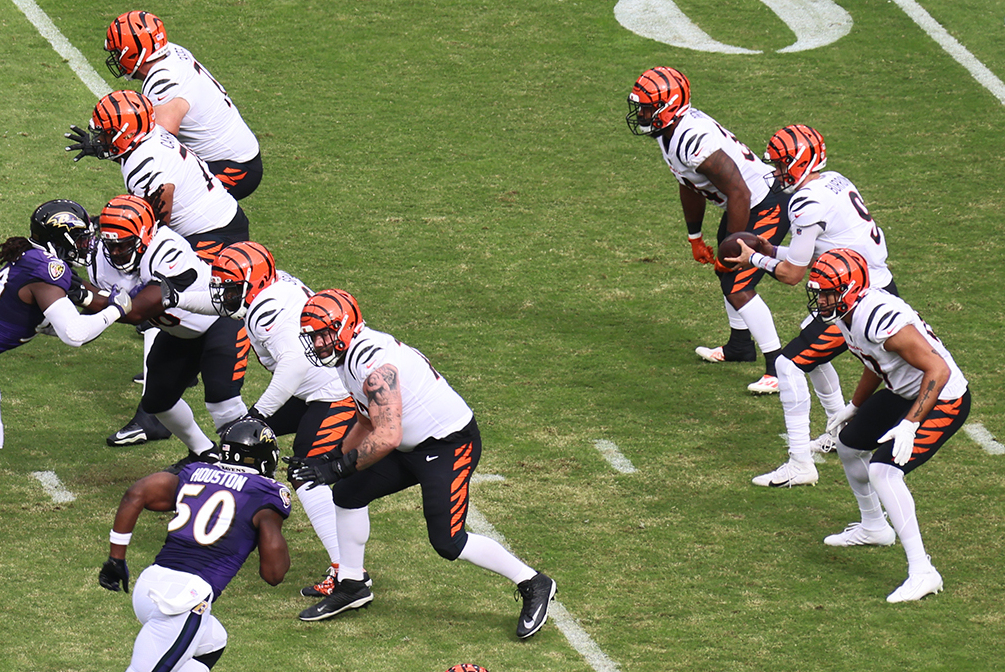
Houston (#50) playing against the Cincinnati Bengals in 2021

On July 31, 2021, Houston signed a one-year deal with the Baltimore Ravens. On November 11, 2021, in a game against the Miami Dolphins, Houston recorded his 100th career sack, sacking quarterback Jacoby Brissett, becoming the 37th player in NFL history to do so. He finished the 2021 season with 4.5 sacks, 34 total tackles (19 solo), one pass defended, one forced fumble, and one fumble recovery in 15 games.

==== 2022 ====
On May 2, 2022, the Ravens placed an unrestricted free agent tender on Houston worth $2.075 million. He re-signed with the team on July 12, 2022. In a Week 9 matchup against the New Orleans Saints, Houston recorded 2.5 sacks and an interception as the Ravens won 27–13. With those sacks, Houston became the first player in Ravens' history to register multiple sacks in three consecutive games. For his performance, Houston was named the AFC Defensive Player of the Week. He finished the 2022 season with 9.5 sacks, 21 total tackles (14 solo), one interception, and one pass defended. He had a sack in the 24–17 loss to the Bengals in the Wild Card Round.

=== Carolina Panthers ===
On August 6, 2023, Houston signed with the Carolina Panthers. He suffered a hamstring injury in Week 8 and was placed on injured reserve on November 4, 2023. He was released upon request on December 19, 2023. In seven games, he had a half-sack, nine tackles (five solo), and one pass defended.

=== Miami Dolphins ===
On January 9, 2024, Houston signed with the Miami Dolphins.

== NFL career statistics ==
Legend
	NFL record
	Led the league
**Bold**	Career high

=== Regular season ===
Year	Team	Games		Tackles					Fumbles				Interceptions					
Year	Team	GP	GS	Cmb	Solo	Ast	Sck	Sfty	FF	FR	Yds	TD	Int	Yds	Avg	Lng	TD	PD
2011	KC	16	10	56	46	10	5.5	0	1	1	0	0	0	–	–	–	–	4
2012	KC	16	16	66	53	13	10.0	1	1	1	4	0	1	**32**	**32.0**	**32**	0	**6**
2013	KC	11	11	44	40	4	11.0	0	1	**3**	7	0	0	–	–	–	–	4
2014	KC	16	16	**68**	**59**	9	**22.0**	0	4	0	–	–	0	–	–	–	–	5
2015	KC	11	11	30	25	5	7.5	0	1	0	–	–	**2**	16	8.0	17	**1**	**6**
2016	KC	5	5	21	20	1	4.0	0	1	0	–	–	0	–	–	–	–	1
2017	KC	15	15	59	46	13	9.5	0	0	2	**13**	**1**	0	–	–	–	–	5
2018	KC	12	12	37	28	9	9.0	0	**5**	**3**	0	0	1	4	4.0	4	0	1
2019	IND	16	16	44	33	11	11.0	1	2	**3**	0	0	0	–	–	–	–	0
2020	IND	16	16	25	19	6	8.0	**2**	0	0	–	–	0	–	–	–	–	0
2021	BAL	15	15	34	19	**15**	4.5	0	1	1	0	0	0	–	–	–	–	1
2022	BAL	14	1	21	14	7	9.5	0	1	0	–	–	1	5	5.0	0	0	1
2023	CAR	7	7	9	5	4	0.5	0	0	0	–	–	0	–	–	–	–	1
Career		170	151	515	409	106	112.0	4	19	14	24	1	5	57	11.4	32	1	35

=== Postseason ===
Year	Team	Games		Tackles					Fumbles				Interceptions					
Year	Team	GP	GS	Cmb	Solo	Ast	Sck	Sfty	FF	FR	Yds	TD	Int	Yds	Avg	Lng	TD	PD
2013	KC	1	1	4	3	**1**	1.0	0	0	**1**	**7**	0	0	–	–	–	–	**1**
2015	KC	2	1	3	2	**1**	0.0	0	0	0	–	–	0	–	–	–	–	0
2016	KC	1	1	**6**	**5**	**1**	0.0	0	0	0	–	–	0	–	–	–	–	0
2017	KC	1	1	2	2	0	1.0	0	0	0	–	–	0	–	–	–	–	**1**
2018	KC	2	2	4	4	0	**2.0**	0	0	**1**	0	0	0	–	–	–	–	**1**
2020	IND	1	1	1	0	**1**	0.5	0	0	0	–	–	0	–	–	–	–	0
2022	BAL	1	1	1	1	0	1.0	0	0	0	–	–	0	–	–	–	–	0
2023	MIA	1	0	1	0	1	0.0	0	0	0	–	–	0	–	–	–	–	0
Career		10	8	22	17	5	5.5	0	0	2	7	0	0	0	0.0	0	0	3

== Personal life ==
Houston is a Christian. He is married with four children.
