= Andrew Wylie (American football) =

American football player (born 1994)

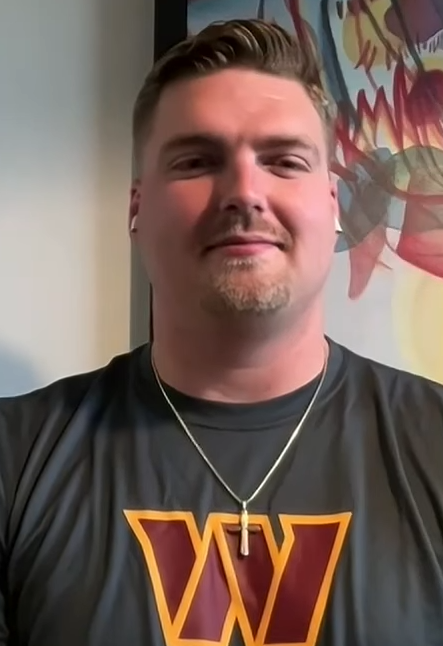
- Wylie with the Washington Commanders in 2023

No. 71 – Washington Commanders
- Position: Offensive tackle
- Roster status: Active

Personal information
- Born: August 19, 1994 (age 32); Hemlock, Michigan, U.S.
- Listed height: 6 ft 5 in (1.96 m)
- Listed weight: 304 lb (138 kg)

Career information
- High school: Midland (Midland, Michigan)
- College: Eastern Michigan (2012–2016)
- NFL draft: 2017: undrafted

Career history
- Indianapolis Colts (2017)*; Cleveland Browns (2017)*; Los Angeles Chargers (2017)*; Kansas City Chiefs (2017–2022); Washington Commanders (2023–present)
- * Offseason or practice squad member only

Awards and highlights
- 2× Super Bowl champion (LIV, LVII); Third-team All-MAC (2016)

Career NFL statistics as of 2025
- Games played: 116
- Games started: 93
- Stats at Pro Football Reference

Andrew Wylie (born August 19, 1994) is an American professional football offensive tackle for the Washington Commanders of the National Football League (NFL). He played college football for the Eastern Michigan Eagles and went undrafted in 2017, having short stints with the Indianapolis Colts, Cleveland Browns, and Los Angeles Chargers before signing with the Kansas City Chiefs, where he won Super Bowl LIV and LVII.

== College career ==
Wylie made 44 starts for the Eastern Michigan Eagles over the course of four seasons. He was named third-team All-Mid-American Conference his senior season.

== Professional career ==
Pre-draft measurables
Height	Weight	Arm length	Hand span	Wingspan	40-yard dash	10-yard split	20-yard split	20-yard shuttle	Three-cone drill	Vertical jump	Broad jump	Bench press
6 ft 5 in (1.96 m)	304 lb (138 kg)	33 3/8 in (0.85 m)	9 1/2 in (0.24 m)	6 ft 9 3/4 in (2.08 m)	5.14 s	1.74 s	2.94 s	4.76 s	7.46 s	34.0 in (0.86 m)	9 ft 7 in (2.92 m)	20 reps
All values from Pro Day

=== Indianapolis Colts ===
Wylie signed with the Indianapolis Colts as an undrafted free agent on May 15, 2017. He was released during final cuts on September 2, and was signed to the Colts' practice squad two days later. Wylie was released by the Colts on September 26.

=== Cleveland Browns ===
Wylie signed with the Cleveland Browns' practice squad on October 9, 2017. Wylie was released by the Browns on December 15.

=== Los Angeles Chargers ===
Wylie was signed to the Los Angeles Chargers practice squad on December 19, 2017, but was released eight days later.

=== Kansas City Chiefs ===
Wylie signed with the Kansas City Chiefs the next day and was promoted to the active roster on January 8, 2018. He made his NFL debut on September 9, in the season opener against the Los Angeles Chargers. Wylie made his first career start on October 21, against the Cincinnati Bengals. Wylie played in all 16 games during the regular season and started the final ten games of the season after Laurent Duvernay-Tardif went down with a season-ending injury. At the end of the season the Chiefs gave Wylie the 2018 Mack Lee Hill Award as the team's best first-year player.

Wylie started 11 games for the Chiefs in 2019, missing five games due to injury. Wylie suffered a high ankle sprain that caused him to miss the final two games of the regular season and all of the Chiefs' playoff games, including the team's win in Super Bowl LIV over the San Francisco 49ers.

Wylie signed a one-year exclusive-rights free agent contract with the Chiefs on April 20, 2020. He started 14 games at right guard during the regular season. He missed the third game of the season due to a severe stomach illness and was rested for the final game of the regular season. Wylie started the Chiefs' first two games of the postseason at right guard, but was shifted to right tackle for Kansas City's loss to the Tampa Bay Buccaneers in Super Bowl LV after starting tackle Eric Fisher tore his achilles in the AFC Championship Game.

The Chiefs placed a restricted free agent tender on Wylie on March 17, 2021. He signed the one-year contract on May 11. He started seven games at right tackle in 2021.

On March 17, 2022, Wylie re-signed with the Chiefs. His performance in the 2022 regular season was criticized for his inconsistency due to surrendering 49 pressures and allowing nine sacks. Wylie started Super Bowl LVII and was part of an offensive line that gave up zero sacks against a vaunted Philadelphia Eagles defense, as the Chiefs won the game 38-35.

=== Washington Commanders ===
Wylie signed a three-year, $24 million contract with the Washington Commanders on March 16, 2023. He started at right tackle for 15 games and was inactive for the last two games of the regular season. He remained the starting right tackle and played in 14 games in the 2024 regular season, as well as, three postseason games. During the 2025 offseason, Wylie competed against Josh Conerly Jr. for the starting right tackle position. Before the 2025 season opener, the Commanders announced that Conerly would be the starting right tackle. Simultaneously, the Commanders announced that Wylie and Nick Allegretti would split the right guard duties as fill-ins for incumbent starter, Sam Cosmi, who was on the physically unable to perform (PUP) list to start the season.

On March 3, 2026, Wylie signed a two-year, $7.5 contract extension to stay with the Commanders.
