= Lloyd Burruss =

American football player (born 1957)

Lloyd Burrus
No. 34
- Position: Safety

Personal information
- Born: October 31, 1957 (age 69); Charlottesville, Virginia, U.S.
- Listed height: 6 ft 0 in (1.83 m)
- Listed weight: 204 lb (93 kg)

Career information
- High school: Charlottesville
- College: Maryland
- NFL draft: 1981: 3rd round, 78th overall pick

Career history
- Kansas City Chiefs (1981–1991)

Awards and highlights
- First-team All-Pro (1986); Second-team All-Pro (1988); Pro Bowl (1986); Kansas City Chiefs Hall of Fame; 2× First-team All-ACC (1978, 1980)

Career NFL statistics
- Interceptions: 22
- Sacks: 2.5
- Fumble recoveries: 7
- Stats at Pro Football Reference

Lloyd Earl Burruss Jr. (born October 31, 1957) is an American former professional football player who was a safety for the Kansas City Chiefs from 1981 to 1991 in the National Football League (NFL). He is one of only six Chiefs to ever be the Mack Lee Hill Award winner (1981), the team's MVP (1985) and a member of the Chiefs Hall of Fame (1999).

Of his 22 interceptions, 4 of them went for touchdowns, and he also scored a touchdown via fumble recovery. During the 1980s, Burruss averaged 63 tackles per season.
