= Derrick Johnson =

American football player (born 1982)

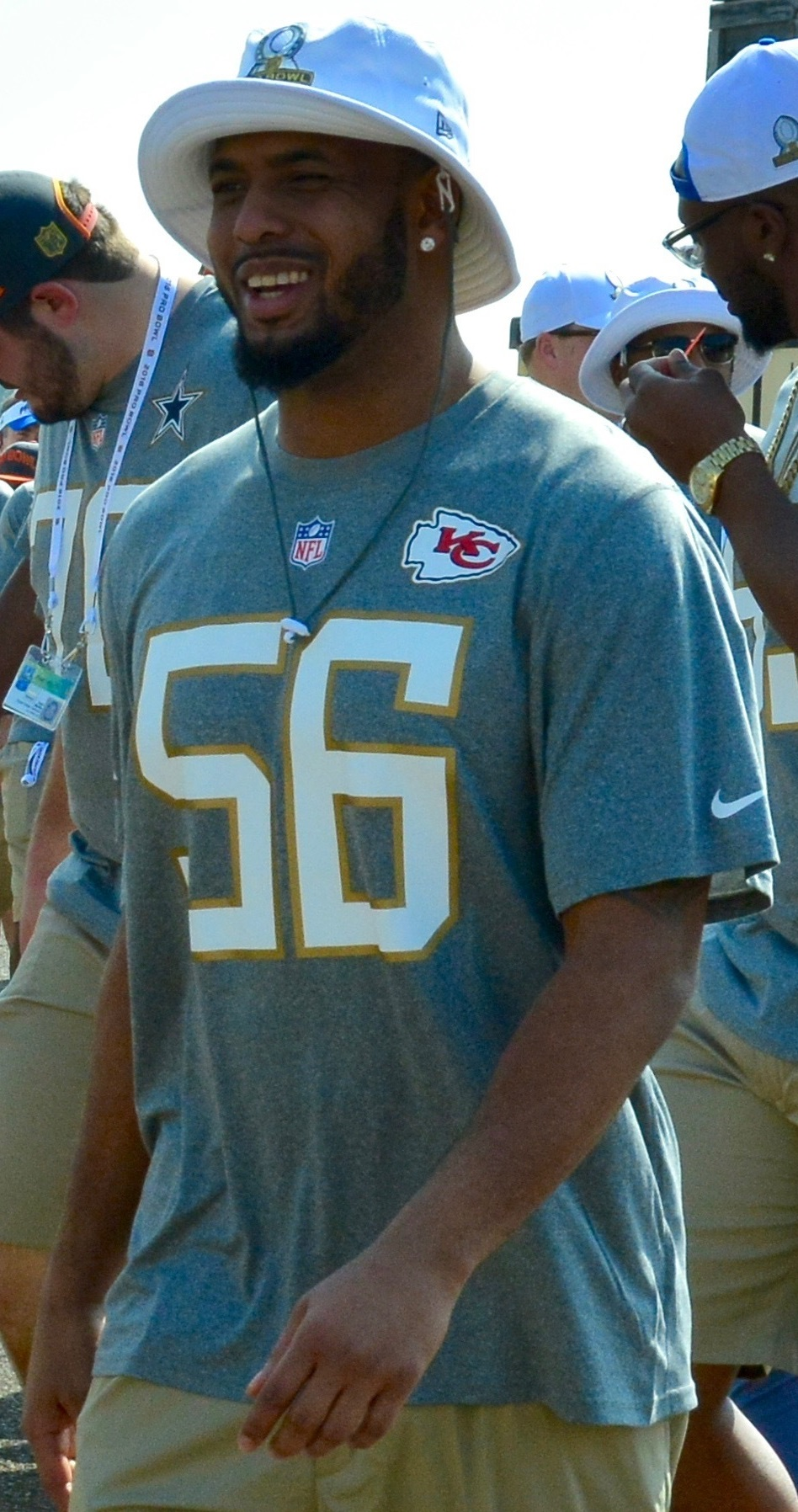
- Johnson at the 2016 Pro Bowl

No. 56
- Position: Linebacker

Personal information
- Born: November 22, 1982 (age 43); Waco, Texas, U.S.
- Listed height: 6 ft 3 in (1.91 m)
- Listed weight: 245 lb (111 kg)

Career information
- High school: Waco
- College: Texas (2001–2004)
- NFL draft: 2005: 1st round, 15th overall pick

Career history
- Kansas City Chiefs (2005–2017); Oakland Raiders (2018)

Awards and highlights
- First-team All-Pro (2011); Second-team All-Pro (2015); 4× Pro Bowl (2011–2013, 2015); Kansas City Chiefs Hall of Fame; Dick Butkus Award (2004); Bronko Nagurski Trophy (2004); Jack Lambert Trophy (2004); Big 12 Defensive Player of the Year (2004); Unanimous All-American (2004); Consensus All-American (2003); 3× First-team All-Big 12 (2002–2004); Big 12 Co-Defensive Freshman of the Year (2001)

Career NFL statistics
- Total tackles: 1,169
- Sacks: 27.5
- Forced fumbles: 23
- Interceptions: 14
- Defensive touchdowns: 4
- Stats at Pro Football Reference
- College Football Hall of Fame

Derrick O'Hara Johnson (born November 22, 1982) is an American former professional football player who was a linebacker in the National Football League (NFL). He played college football for the Texas Longhorns, twice earning consensus All-American honors. Johnson was selected by the Kansas City Chiefs in the first round of the 2005 NFL draft with the 15th overall pick. In his 13 seasons with the Chiefs, Johnson made four Pro Bowls. He also played six games for the Oakland Raiders in 2018.

== Early life ==
Johnson was born in Waco, Texas. He attended Waco High School, where he was a three-sport star in football, track and basketball. In football, Johnson played as a linebacker, registering 170 tackles (103 unassisted), 21.0 stops for loss, six quarterback sacks, five forced fumbles, and two interceptions, including one returned for a touchdown as a senior. He produced a career-high 30 tackles and four forced fumbles in a single game. Johnson earned Parade magazine high school All-America and first-team All-Texas Class 5A honors following both his junior and senior seasons, and played in the first-ever U.S. Army All-American Bowl on December 30, 2000.

As a standout track & field athlete, Johnson was a state-qualifier in the 100-meters and the triple jump. He recorded a 10.5-second 100-meter dash, while also clearing over 48 ft (14.66 m) in the triple jump. At the District 13-5A Championships, Johnson ran a leg on the Waco 4 × 100 m relay squad, helping them earn a fourth-place finish.

== College career ==
Johnson enrolled in The University of Texas at Austin, and played for coach Mack Brown's Texas Longhorns football team from 2001 to 2004 and became one of the most dominant linebackers in Longhorns history. Johnson was a first-team All-Big 12 selection in 2002, 2003, and 2004, a consensus first-team All-American in 2003, and unanimous first-team All-American in 2004. Following his senior season, Johnson was also recognized as the Big 12 Defensive Player of the Year, and received the Dick Butkus Award and Bronko Nagurski Trophy. The Texas Longhorns finished 11–1, and narrowly defeated the Michigan Wolverines 38–37 in the 2005 Rose Bowl.

== Professional career ==
=== Pre-draft ===
Johnson entered the 2005 NFL Draft as a highly touted prospect and attended the NFL Scouting Combine and completed all of the combine drills. On March 23, 2005, he attended Texas' pro day, but opted to stand on his combine numbers and only performed positional drills. He was projected to be a first round pick by NFL draft experts and scouts. He was ranked as the top outside linebacker prospect in the draft by DraftScout.com and DraftCountdown.com.

Pre-draft measurables
Height	Weight	Arm length	Hand span	40-yard dash	10-yard split	20-yard split	20-yard shuttle	Three-cone drill	Vertical jump	Broad jump
6 ft 3 1/4 in (1.91 m)	242 lb (110 kg)	32 1/4 in (0.82 m)	9 1/4 in (0.23 m)	4.54 s	1.61 s	2.66 s	3.87 s	7.20 s	37.5 in (0.95 m)	10 ft 0 in (3.05 m)
All values from NFL Combine

=== Kansas City Chiefs ===
==== 2005 ====
The Kansas City Chiefs selected Johnson in the first round (15th overall) of the 2005 NFL draft. Johnson was the fourth linebacker drafted in 2005.

On July 31, 2005, the Chiefs signed Johnson to a five-year, $10.4 million contract with $7.03 million guaranteed.

Johnson entered training camp slated as a starting outside linebacker. Head coach Dick Vermeil officially named him the left outside linebacker to start the regular season, along with Kendrell Bell and middle linebacker Kawika Mitchell.

Johnson made his professional regular season debut and first career start in the season-opener against the New York Jets and recorded nine combined tackles, forced a fumble, and made his first career sack on quarterback Chad Pennington during the 27–7 victory. Three weeks later, Johnson collected a season-high 10 solo tackles in a 37–31 loss to the Philadelphia Eagles.

Johnson started all 16 games of his rookie season and made 95 combined tackles (72 solo), five pass deflections, two forced fumbles, and two sacks. He was subsequently awarded the Mack Lee Hill Award as their rookie of the year. The Chiefs finished second in the AFC West with a 10–6 record, but did not qualify for the playoffs.

==== 2006 ====
On January 1, 2006, Chiefs head coach Dick Vermeil announced his retirement after five seasons with the team. New head coach Herm Edwards chose to retain defensive coordinator Gunther Cunningham and the base 4–3 defense. He also retained starting linebackers Johnson, Bell, and Mitchell to begin the season.

On October 29, 2006, Johnson made five combined tackles and two sacks on quarterback Matt Hasselbeck in the 30–27 victory over the Seattle Seahawks. Johnson missed two consecutive games (Weeks 10–11) due to a sprained ankle. He aggravated his injury and was also inactive for the Week 13 matchup against the Cleveland Browns. Three weeks later, Johnson had a season-high nine solo tackles during a 20–9 road victory over the Oakland Raiders.

Johnson finished his second professional season with 75 combined tackles (56 solo), 4.5 sacks, and three passes defensed in 13 games and 13 starts.

==== 2007 ====
Head coach Herman Edwards retained Johnson as the starting left outside linebacker to begin the regular season, alongside Donnie Edwards and starting middle linebacker Napoleon Harris.

On September 16, 2007, Johnson recorded seven combined tackles, a season-high two pass deflections, forced a fumble, and sacked quarterback Rex Grossman twice during a 20–10 loss at the Chicago Bears in Week 2. In Week 4, he made three combined tackles, deflected a pass, made a sack, and made his first career interception off a pass by Philip Rivers during a 30–16 victory at the San Diego Chargers. On November 11, 2007, Johnson collected a season-high 11 solo tackles, deflected a pass, forced a fumble, and made an interception in the Chiefs' 27–11 loss to the Denver Broncos in Week 10. He started all 16 games and recorded 94 combined tackles (63 solo), six pass deflections, four sacks, and three forced fumbles.

==== 2008 ====
Johnson and Donnie Edwards returned as the starting outside linebackers in 2008, along with middle linebacker Pat Thomas. On September 28, 2008, Johnson made six combined tackles, a pass deflection, was credited with half a sack, forced a fumble, and also intercepted a pass by quarterback Jay Cutler during a 33–19 victory against the Denver Broncos. The following week, he collected a season-high nine solo tackles and deflected a pass in the Chiefs' 34–0 loss at the Carolina Panthers. He was inactive for two games (Weeks 10–11) after injuring his hamstring the previous week. On December 28, 2008, he collected a season-high 11 combined tackles (five solo) and a pass deflection in the Chiefs' 16–6 loss at the Cincinnati Bengals in Week 17. Johnson recorded 85 combined tackles (68 solo), six passes defensed, four forced fumbles, 1.5 sacks, and an interception in 14 games and 14 starts.

==== 2009 ====
On January 23, 2009, the Kansas City Chiefs fired head coach Herman Edwards after they finished with a 2–14 record in 2008 and did not qualify for the playoffs for the third consecutive season.

The Kansas City Chiefs' new head coach, Todd Haley, hired Clancy Pendergast as the new defensive coordinator. Pendergast chose to install a base 3-4 defense instead of the 4-3 defense previously used. On May 20, 2009, Johnson stated during an interview that the change in base defense has prompted the coaches to move him to inside linebacker. Throughout training camp, Johnson competed for a job as a starting inside linebacker against Demorrio Williams, Corey Mays, Monty Beisel, and rookie Jovan Belcher. Head coach Todd Haley named Johnson a backup inside linebacker to start the regular season, behind Demorrio Williams, Corey Mays, Monty Beisel, and Jovan Belcher. Haley did not give an explanation on Johnson's demotion, but Johnson stated he had no previous experience in a base 3–4 defense and had issues with the transition.

He appeared in the Kansas City Chiefs' season-opener at the Baltimore Ravens and recorded three solo tackles, a pass deflection, and returned an interception by quarterback Joe Flacco for a 70-yard gain during a 38–24 loss. He was inactive for the Chiefs' Week 3 loss at the Philadelphia Eagles after injuring his groin the previous week. In Week 11, he collected a season-high seven combined tackles during a 27–24 victory against the Pittsburgh Steelers. On January 3, 2010, Johnson recorded six combined tackles, a season-high four pass deflections, and returned two interceptions for touchdowns during a 44–24 victory at the Denver Broncos in Week 17. He intercepted a pass by quarterback Kyle Orton, intended for wide receiver Brandon Lloyd, and returned it 45-yards for the first touchdown of his career in the third quarter. Johnson returned another interception by Orton, intended for tight end Daniel Graham, for a 60-yard touchdown in the fourth quarter to tie an NFL single game record for most interceptions returned for touchdowns. He finished the 2008 season with 37 combined tackles (30 solo), five pass deflections, three interceptions, two touchdowns, a sack, and a forced fumble in 15 games and was limited to three starts.

==== 2010 ====
Defensive coordinator Clancy Pendergast was not re-signed by the Chiefs after the 2009 season. The Kansas City Chiefs placed a first round tender on Johnson after he became a restricted free agent in 2010. On May 23, 2010, Johnson signed his one-year, $2.52 million contract.

Throughout training camp, Johnson competed to be a starting inside linebacker against Demorrio Williams and Javon Belcher. Defensive coordinator Romeo Crennel named Johnson a starting left inside linebacker to begin the 2010 season, alongside Javon Belcher, and outside linebackers Mike Vrabel and Tamba Hali.

On October 24, 2010, Johnson made six combined tackles, three pass deflections, and returned an interception for a touchdown during a 42–20 win against the Jacksonville Jaguars. He returned an interception thrown by quarterback Todd Bouman, that was intended for tight end Eric Potter, for a 15-yard touchdown in the third quarter. On November 8, 2010, the Kansas City Chiefs signed Johnson to a five-year, $34 million contract that includes $15 million guaranteed. In Week 10, he collected a season-high 12 solo tackles and deflected two passes in the Chiefs' 49–29 loss at the Denver Broncos. On December 19, 2010, Johnson recorded a season-high 13 combined tackles (ten solo) and a season-high four pass deflections during a 27–13 win at the St. Louis Rams in Week 15. Johnson started all 16 games in 2010 and recorded 121 combined tackles (95 solo), a career-high 16 pass deflections, four forced fumbles, one sack, an interception, and a touchdown.

The Kansas City Chiefs finished first in the AFC West with a 10–6 record and earned a playoff berth. On January 10, 2011, Johnson started in his first career playoff game and seven combined tackles in the Chiefs' 30–7 loss to the Baltimore Ravens in the AFC Wildcard Game.

==== 2011 ====
Defensive coordinator Romeo Crennel retained Johnson and Belcher as the starting inside linebackers to start the season, along with outside linebackers Tamba Hali and Andy Studebaker. In Week 7, Johnson collected a season-high 13 combined tackles (12 solo) as the Chiefs routed the Oakland Raiders 28–0. The following week, he tied his season-high of 13 combined tackles (ten solo), deflected a pass, made a sack, and an interception during a 23–20 win against the San Diego Chargers in Week 8. On December 13, 2011, the Kansas City Chiefs fired head coach Todd Haley after a 35–10 loss to the New York Jets made them fall to a 5–8 record. Defensive coordinator Romeo Crennel was named the interim head coach for the remainder of the season. On December 27, 2011, it was announced that Johnson was voted to the 2012 Pro Bowl. He was selected to the Pro Bowl for the first time in his career and was also named first-team All-Pro. Johnson started in all 16 games and made a career-high 131 combined tackles (104 solo), nine pass deflections, two sacks, two interceptions, and a forced fumble.

==== 2012 ====
The Kansas City Chiefs chose to promote interim head coach/defensive coordinator Romeo Crennel to their full-time head coach. Crennel retained the base 3–4 defense and named Johnson and Javon Belcher the starting inside linebackers to begin the regular season. The pair were joined by outside linebackers Justin Houston and Tamba Hali. On November 12, 2012, Johnson collected a season-high 13 combined tackles (12 solo) in the Chiefs' 16–13 loss at the Pittsburgh Steelers in Week 10. The following week, he made ten solo tackles during a 28–6 loss to the Cincinnati Bengals in Week 11. On December 26, 2012, it was announced that Johnson was voted to the 2013 Pro Bowl. On December 31, 2012, the Kansas City Chiefs fired head coach Romeo Crennel after they finished fourth in the AFC West with a 4–12 record. He started in all 16 games and recorded 125 combined tackles (110 solo), four pass deflections, three forced fumbles, and two sacks. This marked his third consecutive season with over 100 combined tackles.

==== 2013 ====
The Kansas City Chiefs hired former Philadelphia Eagles' head coach Andy Reid. Defensive coordinator Bob Sutton chose to retain a base 3–4 defense. Head coach Andy Reid named Johnson and Akeem Jordan the starting inside linebackers to start the regular season, along with starting outside linebackers Justin Houston and Tamba Hali.

On October 13, 2013, Johnson made nine combined tackles and made a season-high two sacks on quarterback Terrelle Pryor during a 24–7 win against the Oakland Raiders in Week 6. In Week 8, he collected a season-high 12 solo tackles and deflected a pass as the Chiefs defeated the Cleveland Browns 23–17. On December 8, 2013, Johnson made four combined tackles, two pass deflections, and intercepted a pass by Robert Griffin III during a 45–10 victory at the Washington Redskins. The following week, he made six combined tackles, broke up a pass, and intercepted a pass by quarterback Matt McGloin during a 56–31 win at the Oakland Raiders in Week 15. He finished the season with 107 combined tackles (95 solo), six passes defensed, 4.5 sacks, and two interceptions in 16 games and 16 starts. On January 21, 2014, Johnson was selected as a late replacement for the 2014 Pro Bowl after San Francisco 49ers' NaVorro Bowman was unable to participate after tearing his ACL and MCL during the playoffs.

==== 2014 ====
Johnson was named a starting inside linebacker to begin the season, along with Joe Mays. He started in the Kansas City Chiefs' season-opener against the Tennessee Titans and made four solo tackles before exiting in the third quarter of the 28–10 loss after tearing his Achilles tendon. Later in the day, it was announced he would miss the rest of the season. On September 9, 2014, the Kansas City Chiefs placed Johnson on injured reserve for the remainder of the season. He earned an overall grade of 93.4 and finished with the second highest grade among all qualified inside/middle linebackers in the league in 2014.

==== 2015 ====
Head coach Andy Reid named Johnson and Josh Mauga the starting inside linebackers to start the 2015 regular season. On December 6, 2015, Johnson collected a season-high 14 combined tackles (13 solo) and a sack during a 34–20 win against the Oakland Raiders. The following week, he made six combined tackles, a pass deflection, and an interception in the Chiefs' 10–3 win against the San Diego Chargers in Week 14. He started all 16 games in 2015 and made 116 combined tackles (95 solo), eight pass deflections, four sacks, two forced fumbles, and two interceptions.

The Kansas City Chiefs finished second in the AFC West with an 11–5 record and earned a wildcard berth. On January 9, 2016, Johnson recorded six combined tackles in the Chiefs' 30–0 victory at the Houston Texans in the AFC Wildcard Game. The following week, he made four combined tackles in the Chiefs' 27–20 loss at the New England Patriots in the AFC Divisional Round. On January 25, 2016, Johnson was named to the 2016 Pro Bowl as a late replacement for Carolina Panthers' linebacker Luke Kuechly who was participating in Super Bowl 50. Johnson was ranked 80th by his fellow players on the NFL Top 100 Players of 2016.

==== 2016 ====
On March 9, 2016, the Kansas City Chiefs signed Johnson to a three-year, $21 million contract that includes $9 million guaranteed.

Head coach Andy Reid named Johnson and Justin March-Lillard the starting inside linebackers to begin the season, along with outside linebackers Justin Houston and Tamba Hali. On September 18, 2016, Johnson collected a season-high 11 combined tackles (eight solo) during a 19–12 loss at the Houston Texans. The following week, he made ten combined tackles (eight solo), two pass deflections, and returned an interception for a touchdown during a 24–3 win against the New York Jets in Week 3. Johnson intercepted a pass thrown by quarterback Ryan Fitzpatrick, intended for running back Matt Forte, and returned it for a 55-yard touchdown in the fourth quarter. In Week 9, Johnson made a season-high nine solo tackles during a 29–28 win at the Atlanta Falcons. On December 8, 2016, Johnson tore his Achilles during a 21–13 victory against the Oakland Raiders. On December 17, 2016, the Kansas City Chiefs placed him on injured reserve for the rest of the season. He finished the season with 90 combined tackles (70 solo), three pass deflections, a sack, an interception, and a touchdown in 13 games and 13 starts.

==== 2017 ====
In Week 13, Johnson collected a season-high nine combined tackles during a 38–31 loss at the New York Jets. He finished the season with 71 combined tackles (48 solo) and seven pass deflections in 15 games and 15 starts. The Kansas City Chiefs finished atop the AFC West with a 10–6 and earned a wildcard berth. On January 6, 2018, Johnson made eight combined tackles and sacked quarterback Marcus Mariota once in the narrow 22–21 loss to the Tennessee Titans in the AFC Wild Card Round

On February 13, 2018, the Chiefs announced that they had used an option in Johnson's contract allowing them to void the final year without penalty. He became a free agent at the beginning of the new league year on March 14.

=== Oakland Raiders ===
On May 4, 2018, the Oakland Raiders signed Johnson to a one-year, $1.50 million contract with $500,000 guaranteed and a signing bonus of $250,000. He was released on October 16, 2018 at his request.

=== Retirement ===
On May 8, 2019, Johnson retired after signing a one-day ceremonial contract with the Chiefs.

== Career statistics ==
Legend
**Bold**	Career high

=== NFL ===
Year	Team	Games		Tackles				Interceptions				Fumbles			
Year	Team	GP	GS	Cmb	Solo	Ast	Sck	Int	Yds	TD	PD	FF	FR	Yds	TD
2005	KC	16	16	96	80	16	2.0	0	0	0	5	2	1	0	0
2006	KC	13	12	76	58	18	**4.5**	0	0	0	2	1	**2**	0	0
2007	KC	16	16	94	83	11	4.0	2	18	0	6	3	0	0	0
2008	KC	14	14	86	69	17	1.5	1	7	0	6	**4**	0	0	0
2009	KC	15	3	37	30	7	1.0	**3**	**175**	**2**	5	1	0	0	0
2010	KC	16	16	122	96	26	1.0	1	15	1	**16**	3	0	0	0
2011	KC	16	16	**131**	104	**27**	2.0	2	18	0	9	1	0	0	0
2012	KC	16	16	124	**109**	15	2.0	0	0	0	4	**4**	0	0	0
2013	KC	15	15	107	95	12	**4.5**	2	44	0	6	0	**2**	**11**	0
2014	KC	1	1	4	4	0	0.0	0	0	0	0	0	0	0	0
2015	KC	16	16	116	95	21	4.0	2	23	0	8	2	0	0	0
2016	KC	13	13	90	70	20	1.0	1	55	1	3	0	0	0	0
2017	KC	15	15	71	48	23	0.0	0	0	0	7	0	1	3	0
2018	OAK	6	1	17	14	3	0.0	0	0	0	0	0	0	0	0
Career		188	170	1,171	955	216	27.5	14	355	4	77	22	8	14	0

=== College ===
Season	GP	Tackles					Interceptions			Fumbles		
Season	GP	Cmb	Solo	Ast	TfL	Sck	Int	Yds	BU	FF	FR	Yds
2001	12	83	57	26	17	**4.5**	0	0	3	1	2	0
2002	13	120	73	47	13	2.0	**4**	85	**10**	0	0	0
2003	13	125	**78**	47	**20**	2.0	**4**	**92**	9	1	**3**	**12**
2004	12	**130**	73	**57**	19	2.0	1	18	8	**9**	0	0
Career	50	458	281	177	69	10.5	9	195	30	11	5	12

== Career highlights ==
NFL

- 4× Pro Bowl selection (2011–2013, 2015)
- First-team All-Pro selection (2011)
- Second-team All-Pro selection (2015)
- Pro Bowl Defensive MVP (2013)
- 4× NFL Top 100 — 78th (2012), 59th (2013), 64th (2014), 80th (2016)
- PFWA All-AFC selection (2012)
- Kansas City Chiefs All Time Leading Tackler (1,151)

College

- Dick Butkus Award (2004)
- Bronko Nagurski Trophy (2004)
- Jack Lambert Trophy (2004)
- Big 12 Defensive Player of the Year (2004)
- 2× Consensus All-American (2003, 2004)
- 3× First-team All-Big 12 (2002–2004)
- Big 12 Co-Defensive Freshman of the Year (2001)

== Personal life ==
His older brother, Dwight Johnson, along with his cousins, Bert Emanuel and Ben Emanuel also played for the NFL.

== See also ==
- List of Texas Longhorns football All-Americans
- List of Kansas City Chiefs first-round draft picks
