= 2014 Pro Bowl =

National Football League all-star game

2014 NFL Pro Bowl
| Team Rice | Team Sanders |
|---|---|
| 22 | 21 |
| Head coach: Ron Rivera (Carolina Panthers) | Head coach: Chuck Pagano (Indianapolis Colts) |
| | 1 | 2 | 3 | 4 | Total |
|---|---|---|---|---|---|
| Team Rice | 0 | 14 | 0 | 8 | 22 |
| Team Sanders | 7 | 7 | 0 | 7 | 21 |
- Date: January 26, 2014
- Stadium: Aloha Stadium; Honolulu, Hawaii
- Offensive MVP: Nick Foles (Philadelphia Eagles)
- Defensive MVP: Derrick Johnson (Kansas City Chiefs)
- Referee: Scott Green
- Attendance: 47,270

Ceremonies
- National anthem: Grace Potter
- Coin toss: Adm. Harry B. Harris Jr., USN
- Halftime show: Fall Out Boy

TV in the United States
- Network: NBC
- Announcers: Al Michaels, Cris Collinsworth, Michele Tafoya, and Doug Flutie
- Nielsen ratings: 5.4 (national); US viewership: 9.27 million est.
- Market share: 6

The 2014 Pro Bowl was the National Football League's all-star game for the 2013 season. It took place at 2:30 pm local time on January 26 at Aloha Stadium in Honolulu, Hawaii. The game was televised nationally by NBC and was the final Pro Bowl on network television before ABC's airing in 2018 as part of a simulcast with sister network ESPN, whose parent company Disney currently holds domestic television rights to the game.

Significant changes to the Pro Bowl format were adopted in an attempt to make the game more "fan-friendly". These changes were proposed by National Football League Players Association president Dominique Foxworth and developed in partnership between the league and the players' union.

The most significant change was a switch to a "fantasy draft" format rather than pitting AFC all-stars against NFC all-stars. Hall of Fame players Jerry Rice and Deion Sanders were chosen, as honorary team captains, and joined by two active players each to assist in their selections. Chuck Pagano of the AFC South winning Indianapolis Colts coached Team Sanders, while Ron Rivera of the NFC South winning Carolina Panthers coached Team Rice. These coaches were selected for coaching the highest seeded teams to lose in the Divisional round of the playoffs, which has been the convention since the 2010 Pro Bowl.

Team Rice won the game 22–21.

== Rule changes ==
- The rosters now consist of 44 players per squad, with an additional defensive back added.
- Two former players, Jerry Rice and Deion Sanders, drafted players to be members of the teams. Each was assisted by two player captains, and a top player from NFL.com fantasy football. The player captains were the top two offensive and defensive players from teams not in the conference championships, as determined by a vote; Drew Brees and Robert Quinn represented Team Rice, while Team Sanders was represented by Jamaal Charles and J. J. Watt. The draft was held on January 21 and 22, 2014, with the selection of top offensive and defensive positions held during a primetime broadcast on the second day, aired by NFL Network.
- A "Game within the Game" format saw the addition of two-minute warnings to all four quarters, with a change of possession to start each quarter. The intention of this rule is to encourage four exciting two-minute drills.
- No kickoffs. A coin toss will determine which team is awarded possession first, and the ball will be placed on the 25-yard line at the start of each quarter and after scoring plays.
- The defense is now permitted to play "cover two" and "press" coverage. In the previous years, only the "man" coverage was permitted, except for goal line situations.
- Beginning at the two-minute mark of every quarter, if the offense does not gain at least one yard, the clock stops as if the play were an incomplete pass.
- A 35-second and 25-second play clock is used instead of the usual 40-second and 25-second clock.
- The game clock does not stop on quarterback sacks outside of the final 2 minutes of regulation.

== Summary ==
To begin the game, the coin toss was won by Team Sanders. They decided to defer to the second half, so Team Rice started with the ball.

The game featured six interceptions and nine sacks, while the 22–21 score was the lowest since the 2006 Pro Bowl, which ended with a 23–17 NFC win.

=== Scoring summary ===
The scores broken down by quarter:

2014 Pro Bowl: Team Rice 22, Team Sanders 21

| Quarter | 1 | 2 | 3 | 4 | Total |
|---|---|---|---|---|---|
| Team Rice | 0 | 14 | 0 | 8 | 22 |
| Team Sanders | 7 | 7 | 0 | 7 | 21 |

at Aloha Stadium in Honolulu, Hawaii

- Date: January 26, 2014
- Game time: 7:30 p.m. EST / 2:30 p.m. HST
- Game weather: On and off rain, clearing late; temperature 21 C (73 F)
- 2014 Pro Bowl – National Football League Game Summary

Scoring summary

| Quarter | Time | Drive | | | Team | Scoring information | Score | |
| Quarter | Time | Plays | Yards | TOP | Team | Scoring information | RIC | SAN |
|---|---|---|---|---|---|---|---|---|
| 1 | 10:10 | 5 | 74 | 2:50 | SAN | Jackson 36-yard touchdown reception from Luck, Tucker kick good | 0 | 7 |
| 2 | 9:05 | 7 | 55 | 3:25 | RIC | Graham 8-yard touchdown reception from Brees, Gostkowski kick good | 7 | 7 |
| 2 | 5:42 | 4 | 7 | 2:08 | SAN | Newton 1-yard touchdown run, Tucker kick good | 7 | 14 |
| 2 | 0:36 | 7 | 58 | 1:56 | RIC | Gordon 10-yard touchdown reception from Rivers, Gostkowski kick good | 14 | 14 |
| 4 | 4:41 | 5 | 57 | 2:39 | SAN | Cameron 12-yard touchdown reception from Foles, Tucker kick good | 14 | 21 |
| 4 | 0:41 | 4 | 26 | 0:19 | RIC | Murray 20-yard touchdown reception from Smith, 2-point Tolbert run good | 22 | 21 |
| "TOP" = time of possession. For other American football terms, see Glossary of American football. | | | | | | | 22 | 21 |

== Rosters ==
=== Team Deion Sanders ===
Team Sanders
| Quarterbacks: 1 Cam Newton; 9 Nick Foles ^{[a]}; 12 Andrew Luck ^{[a]}; Running backs: 25 Jamaal Charles (C); 27 Eddie Lacy ^{[a]}; 45 Marcel Reece FB; 46 Alfred Morris ^{[a]}; Wide receivers: 10 DeSean Jackson ^{[a]}; 18 A. J. Green; 84 Antonio Brown; 88 Dez Bryant; Tight ends: 87 Rob Gronkowski; 82 Jason Witten ^{[a]}; 84 Jordan Cameron ^{[a]}; Offensive tackles: 71 Trent Williams; 76 Duane Brown ^{[a]}; 76 Branden Albert; Guards: 70 Logan Mankins; 73 Marshal Yanda; 75 Kyle Long ^{[a]}; Centers: 51 Mike Pouncey; 55 Alex Mack | Defensive ends: 76 Greg Hardy; 94 Mario Williams; 99 J. J. Watt (C); Defensive tackles: 90 Ndamukong Suh; 92 Dontari Poe; 93 Gerald McCoy; Outside Linebackers: 55 Terrell Suggs; 91 Tamba Hali; 98 Brian Orakpo ^{[a]}; Inside Linebackers: 51 Paul Posluszny ^{[a]}; 59 Luke Kuechly; Cornerbacks: 21 Patrick Peterson; 21 Brent Grimes; 24 Darrelle Revis; 26 Tim Jennings ^{[a]}; Safeties: 29 Eric Berry; 32 Eric Weddle; 43 T. J. Ward ^{[a]} | Punter: 2 Brandon Fields; Placekicker: 9 Justin Tucker; Return Specialist: 84 Cordarrelle Patterson; Long Snapper: 44 J. J. Jansen; Special Teamer: 18 Matthew Slater |

=== Team Rice ===
Team Rice
| Quarterbacks: 9 Drew Brees (C); 11 Alex Smith ^{[a]}; 17 Philip Rivers; Running backs: 22 Matt Forte; 25 LeSean McCoy; 29 DeMarco Murray ^{[a]}; 35 Mike Tolbert FB; Wide receivers: 11 Larry Fitzgerald ^{[a]}; 12 Josh Gordon; 15 Brandon Marshall; 17 Alshon Jeffery ^{[a]}; Tight ends: 80 Jimmy Graham; 88 Tony Gonzalez ^{[a]}; Offensive Tackles: 69 Jordan Gross ^{[a]}; 73 Joe Thomas; 77 Tyron Smith; Guards: 66 Ben Grubbs; 69 Evan Mathis ^{[a]}; 73 Jahri Evans; Centers: 67 Ryan Kalil; 74 Nick Mangold ^{[a]} | Defensive ends: 91 Cameron Wake; 94 Robert Quinn (C); 94 Cameron Jordan; Defensive tackles: 95 Kyle Williams; 97 Jason Hatcher ^{[a]}; 99 Marcell Dareus ^{[a]}; Outside Linebackers: 50 Justin Houston; 55 John Abraham; 98 Robert Mathis; Inside Linebackers: 55 Vontaze Burfict; 56 Derrick Johnson ^{[a]}; Cornerbacks: 20 Alterraun Verner; 23 Joe Haden; 24 Brandon Flowers; 31 Antonio Cromartie ^{[a]}; Safeties: 26 Antrel Rolle ^{[a]}; 31 Jairus Byrd; 35 Eric Reid ^{[a]} | Punter: 6 Johnny Hekker; Placekicker: 3 Stephen Gostkowski ^{[a]}; Return Specialist: 22 Dexter McCluster; Long Snapper: 45 Matt Overton; Special Teamer: 31 Justin Bethel |

=== Selected but did not participate ===
Selected but did not participate
| Quarterbacks: 3 Russell Wilson ^{[c]}; 12 Tom Brady ^{[b]}; 18 Peyton Manning ^{[c]}; Running backs: 21 Frank Gore ^{[b]}; 24 Marshawn Lynch ^{[c]}; 28 Adrian Peterson ^{[b]}; Wide receivers: 80 Andre Johnson ^{[b]}; 81 Calvin Johnson ^{[b]}; 88 Demaryius Thomas ^{[c]}; Tight ends: 80 Julius Thomas ^{[c]}; 85 Vernon Davis ^{[b]}; Offensive Tackles: 71 Jason Peters ^{[b]}; 74 Joe Staley ^{[b]}; Guards: 65 Louis Vasquez ^{[c]}; 77 Mike Iupati ^{[b]}; Centers: 60 Max Unger ^{[c]} | Defensive tackles: 92 Haloti Ngata ^{[b]}; 94 Justin Smith ^{[b]}; Outside Linebackers: 55 Ahmad Brooks ^{[b]}; Inside Linebackers: 52 Patrick Willis ^{[b]}; 53 NaVorro Bowman ^{[b]}; Cornerbacks: 25 Richard Sherman ^{[c]}; 31 Aqib Talib ^{[b]}; Safeties: 29 Earl Thomas ^{[c]}; 31 Kam Chancellor ^{[c]}; 31 Donte Whitner ^{[a]}^{[b]}; 43 Troy Polamalu ^{[b]} | Placekicker: 5 Matt Prater ^{[c]} |

Notes:

(C) signifies the player was selected as a captain
^{a} Replacement selection due to injury or vacancy
^{b} Injured player; selected but did not play
^{c} Selected but did not play because his team advanced to Super Bowl XLVIII (see Pro Bowl "Player Selection" section)

== Number of selections per team ==
American Football Conference
| Team | Selections |
|---|---|
| Kansas City Chiefs | 10 |
| Cleveland Browns | 6 |
| Denver Broncos | 5 |
| New England Patriots | 5 |
| Baltimore Ravens | 4 |
| Buffalo Bills | 4 |
| Miami Dolphins | 4 |
| Houston Texans | 3 |
| Indianapolis Colts | 3 |
| Cincinnati Bengals | 2 |
| New York Jets | 2 |
| Pittsburgh Steelers | 2 |
| San Diego Chargers | 2 |
| Jacksonville Jaguars | 1 |
| Oakland Raiders | 1 |
| Tennessee Titans | 1 |

National Football Conference
| Team | Selections |
|---|---|
| San Francisco 49ers | 10 |
| Carolina Panthers | 7 |
| Seattle Seahawks | 6 |
| Chicago Bears | 5 |
| Dallas Cowboys | 5 |
| New Orleans Saints | 5 |
| Philadelphia Eagles | 5 |
| Arizona Cardinals | 4 |
| Washington Redskins | 3 |
| Detroit Lions | 2 |
| Minnesota Vikings | 2 |
| St. Louis Rams | 2 |
| Tampa Bay Buccaneers | 2 |
| Atlanta Falcons | 1 |
| Green Bay Packers | 1 |
| New York Giants | 1 |

== Broadcasting ==
The game was televised nationally by NBC and was the final Pro Bowl on network television until 2018. ESPN took over the exclusive broadcast rights to the Pro Bowl, effective in 2015, and eventually began simulcasting the game on ABC in 2018. In France, the game was televised by BeIN Sport, and in the United Kingdom and Ireland, by Sky Sports. In Slovenia, the game was televised by Šport TV, and in Germany, by Sport1 US.

Westwood One radio also broadcast the game nationally.

== Ratings ==
7pm; Cris Collinsworth's Sunday Night Football Special

- HH: 3.6; Viewers: 5.555 million

7:30pm; 2014 Pro Bowl

- HH: 6.6; Viewers: 11.378 million

10:47pm; Pro Bowl Post-Game

- HH: 4.7; Viewers: 7.822 million
- 7:30 – HH: 6.3; Viewers: 10.809 million
- 8:00 – HH: 7.1; Viewers: 12.502 million
- 8:30 – HH: 7.1; Viewers: 12.588 million
- 9:00 – HH: 6.4; Viewers: 11.248 million
- 9:30 – HH: 6.4; Viewers: 10.961 million
- 10:00 – HH: 6.3; Viewers: 10.514 million
- 10:30–10:47 – HH: 6.5; Viewers: 10.750 million
