= Mack Lee Hill =

American football player (1940–1965)

- Hill c. 1965

No. 36
- Position: Fullback

Personal information
- Born: August 17, 1940; Quincy, Florida, U.S.
- Died: December 14, 1965 (aged 25); Kansas City, Missouri, U.S.
- Listed height: 5 ft 11 in (1.80 m)
- Listed weight: 225 lb (102 kg)

Career information
- High school: Carter-Parramore (Quincy)
- College: Southern
- NFL draft: 1964: undrafted

Career history
- Kansas City Chiefs (1964–1965)

Awards and highlights
- AFL All-Star (1964); Kansas City Chiefs Hall of Fame; Kansas City Chiefs No. 36 retired

Career AFL statistics
- Rushing yards: 1,203
- Rushing average: 5.2
- Rushing touchdowns: 6
- Receptions: 40
- Receiving yards: 408
- Receiving touchdowns: 3
- Stats at Pro Football Reference

Mack Lee Hill (August 17, 1940 – December 14, 1965) was an American professional football fullback who played in the American Football League (AFL) for the Kansas City Chiefs. He played college football for the Southern Jaguars. Hill joined the Chiefs as an undrafted free agent. He died suddenly after undergoing knee surgery, two days after a game against the Buffalo Bills in 1965.

== Career ==
Born and raised in Quincy, Florida, Hill made the Chiefs' roster in 1964 as a rookie free agent out of Southern University in Baton Rouge, signing for only $300, with an agreement he would only be paid if he made the lineup. He wound up as the team's second-leading rusher that season with 567 yards and four touchdowns on 105 carries. Hill played in the AFL All-Star Game after his rookie campaign. He gained 627 yards, second-most on the team, in 1965, even though he did not complete the season, dying in knee surgery after the 12th game. He was nicknamed "The Truck."

== Death ==
Hill tore a ligament in his right knee in a regular season game against the Bills on December 12, 1965 forcing him to undergo season-ending surgery on that knee two days later at Menorah Medical Center in Kansas City. He was still on the operating table when his temperature suddenly spiked to 108 °F (42 °C), triggering severe convulsions, and he died 1 1/2 hours after surgery. Doctors said he suffered a "sudden and massive embolism."

Team doctor Albert R. Miller said the embolism could have been caused by a fat globule breaking off and entering the bloodstream, or it could have been triggered by a severe reaction to the anesthesia.

Head coach Hank Stram said, "Mack Lee Hill was a fine gentleman and a great football player. He was probably one of the most unselfish players I have ever coached. He was completely dedicated to the team. Football was his life."

Through Hill's inspiration, the Chiefs created the Mack Lee Hill Award, which is given each season to the team's most outstanding rookie. His No. 36 jersey has been retired.

Hill had one son.

== See also ==
- List of American Football League players
- List of American football players who died during their career
