= Jamaal Charles =

American football player (born 1986)

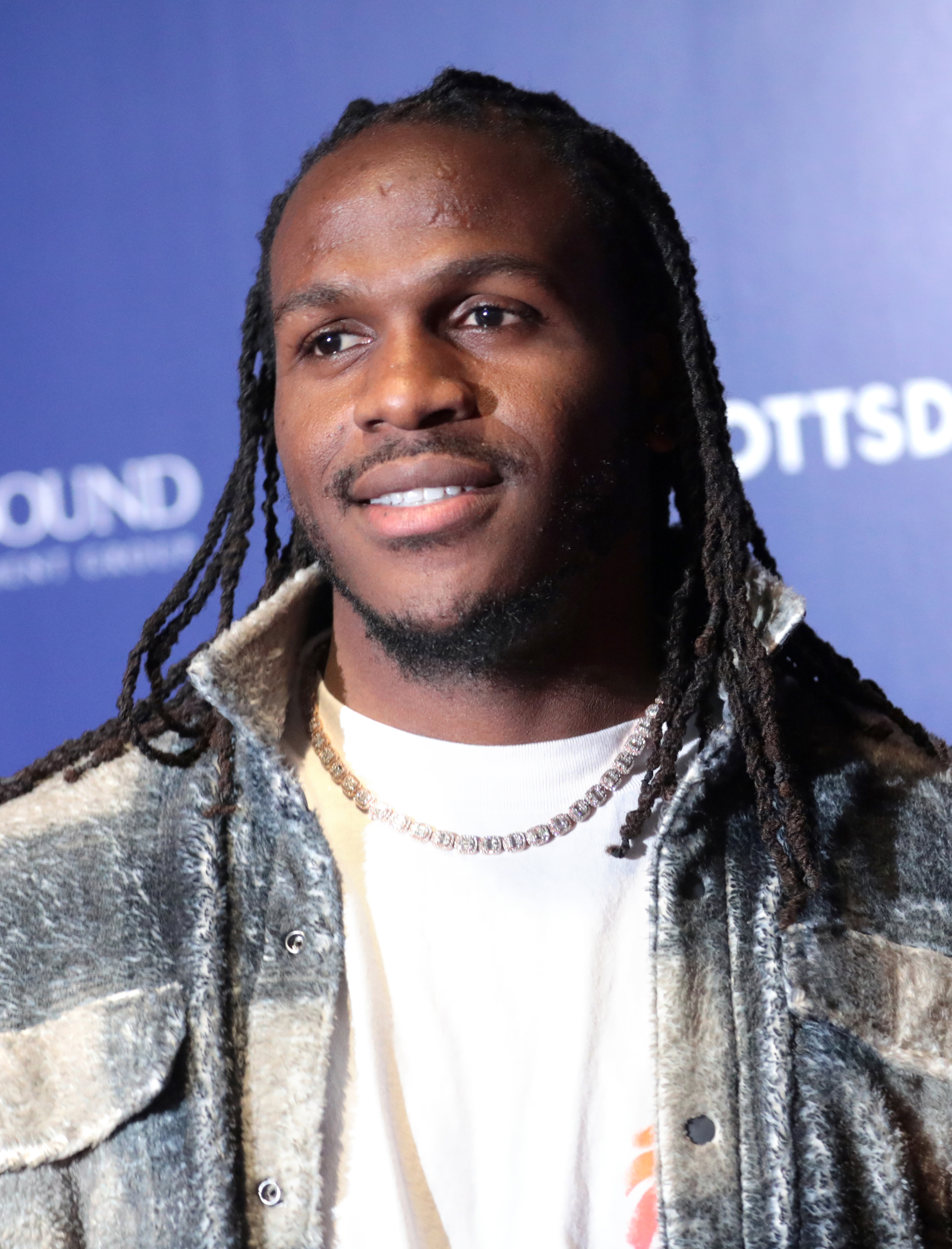
- Charles in 2023

No. 25, 28, 31
- Position: Running back

Personal information
- Born: December 27, 1986 (age 39); Port Arthur, Texas, U.S.
- Listed height: 5 ft 11 in (1.80 m)
- Listed weight: 199 lb (90 kg)

Career information
- High school: Memorial (Port Arthur)
- College: Texas (2005–2007)
- NFL draft: 2008: 3rd round, 73rd overall pick

Career history
- Kansas City Chiefs (2008–2016); Denver Broncos (2017); Jacksonville Jaguars (2018)

Awards and highlights
- 2× First-team All-Pro (2010, 2013); Second-team All-Pro (2012); 4× Pro Bowl (2010, 2012–2014); NFL rushing touchdowns leader (2013); BCS national champion (2005); Big 12 Offensive Freshman of the Year (2005); First-team All-Big 12 (2007)

Career NFL statistics
- Rushing yards: 7,563
- Rushing average: 5.4
- Rushing touchdowns: 44
- Receptions: 310
- Receiving yards: 2,593
- Receiving touchdowns: 20
- Stats at Pro Football Reference

Jamaal RaShaad Jones Charles (born December 27, 1986) is an American former professional football player who was a running back for 11 seasons in the National Football League (NFL), primarily with the Kansas City Chiefs. He played college football for the Texas Longhorns, where he won the 2006 Rose Bowl, and was selected by the Chiefs in the third round of the 2008 NFL draft.

Charles began his career as a backup to halfback Larry Johnson, rushing only 67 times for 357 yards in his rookie season. His breakout season came the following year in 2009. In his second year, Charles rushed 190 times for 1,120 yards, despite only starting 10 games after Johnson was suspended. Shortly thereafter, Johnson was released, leaving Charles as Kansas City's starting halfback. Over the next several seasons he would make four Pro Bowls and two All-Pro teams, and would lead the league in rushing touchdowns in 2013. Charles later suffered injuries, which lead to him appearing in just five games in 2015 and 2016, and he was eventually released by the team.

Charles then played a season for the Denver Broncos and had a 2-game stint for the Jacksonville Jaguars in 2018. He is the all-time leader in yards per carry among players with at least 1,000 carries with 5.4 yards per carry.

== Early life ==
Charles has reported being diagnosed with a learning disability as a child, having difficulty reading, and being mocked and teased. In 2015, he shared his experience including being invited to participate in the Special Olympics: "[...] I was afraid. I was lost. When I was a boy, I had trouble reading. I found out I had a learning disability. People made fun of me. They said I would never go anywhere. But I learned I can fly. When I was 10 years old, I had a chance to compete in the Special Olympics. That's right, the Special Olympics gave me my first chance to discover the talent I did not know that I had. When I competed in the Special Olympics, I found out just how fast I was. I stood high on the podium, getting the gold medal in track and field."

Charles attended and played high school football for Memorial High School of Port Arthur, Texas. As a junior, he ran for 2,051 yards and 25 touchdowns while leading Memorial to the 5A Division II quarterfinals. He was named first-team all-state by the Texas Sports Writers Association and second-team all-state by the Associated Press.

Charles followed up his stellar junior season by rushing for 2,056 yards and 25 touchdowns during his senior year with the Titans. The Associated Press named him to their first-team all-state squad and he was declared the Houston Chronicle area offensive MVP. Charles was also named to the 2005 Parade All-America Football Team and was the District 22-5A Player of the Year his senior year. Charles participated in the 2005 U.S. Army All-American Bowl.

Charles is a two-time recipient of the Willie Ray Smith Award, which is given to the southeast Texas offensive MVP.

Charles was also a standout track athlete at Port Arthur (TX) Memorial. In the summer between his sophomore and junior years, Charles won the bronze medal in the 400m hurdles at the 2003 World Youth Championships in Athletics. He went on to win the 110m hurdles and 300m hurdles Texas 5A state championships with times of 13.69 and 36.03 seconds, respectively, his senior year.

== College career ==
Charles attended the university of Texas from 2005 to 2008, where he was a two-sport athlete in football and track.

=== Football ===
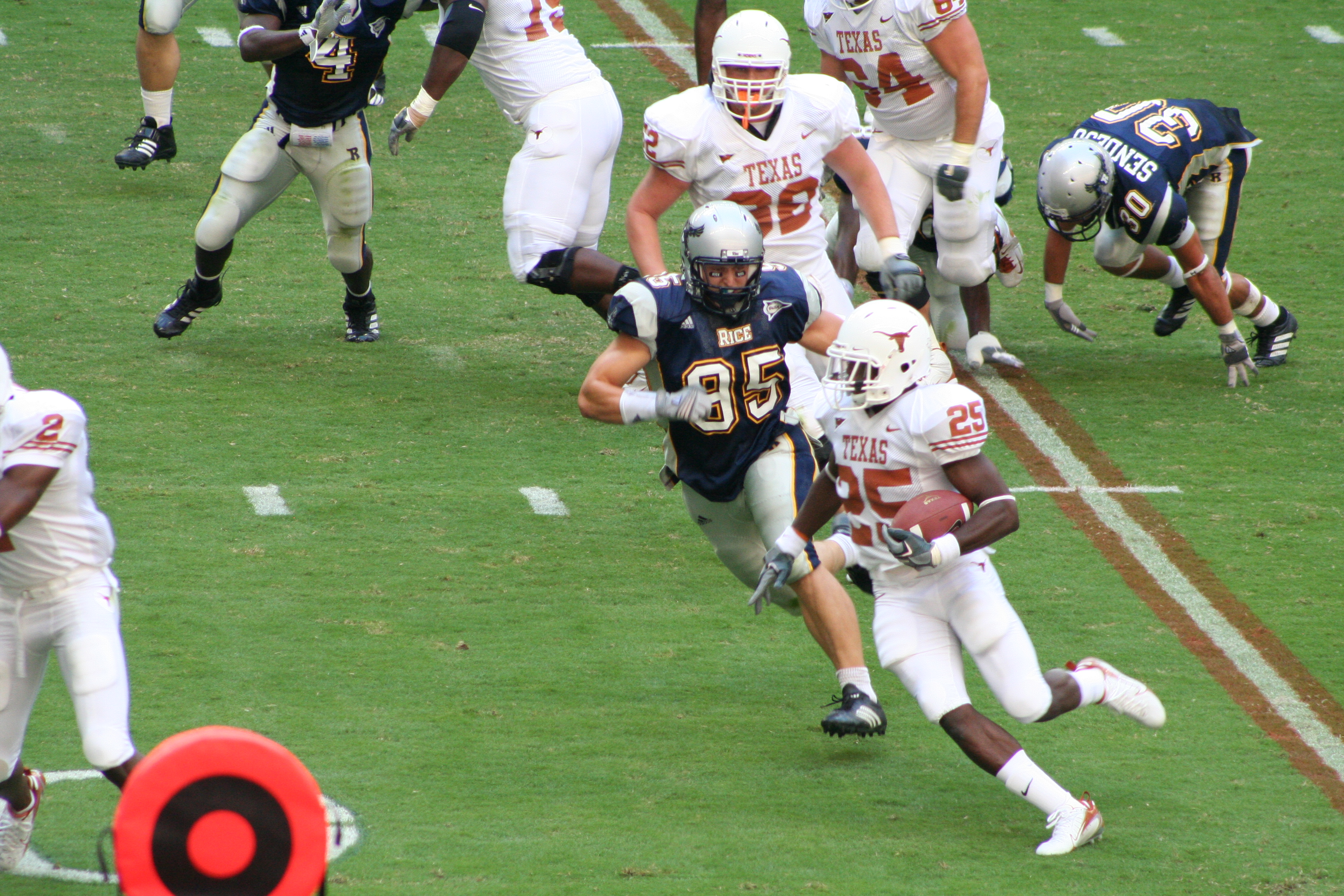
Tailback Jamaal Charles of the 2006 Texas Longhorns football team rushes for a first down vs the Rice University Owls September 16, 2006.

Charles attended and played college football for the University of Texas from 2005 to 2007 under head coach Mack Brown.

==== 2005 season ====
In his true freshman season with the Longhorns, Charles was an contributor in a backfield that included Vince Young as a dual-threat quarterback.

In his collegiate debut against Louisiana-Lafayette, he had 14 carries for 135 rushing yards and a rushing touchdown in the 60–3 victory. His 135 yards set the school record for rushing yards in a freshman debut.

Against Ohio State, he caught 6 passes for 69 yards, which was the 4th most receptions in a game by a freshman in school history at the time.

Two weeks later, against Rice, he had 16 carries for 189 rushing yards, the second most by a Longhorn freshman in school history at the time, and three rushing touchdowns in the 51–10 victory.

On October 8, in the Red River Showdown against Oklahoma, he had nine carries for 116 rushing yards, including an 80-yard touchdown run that was one of the 10 longest in school history and the 2nd most by a freshman at the time, in the 45–12 victory. Texas ended up going 11–0 in the regular season to earn a berth in the Big 12 Championship Game against Colorado. Against the Buffaloes, he had seven carries for 62 rushing yards and two rushing touchdowns in the 70–3 victory. The victory put Texas in the National Championship Game in the Rose Bowl against the USC Trojans. He had five carries for 34 rushing yards in the 41–38 victory as Texas claimed a perfect season and National Championship.

Overall, Charles rushed 119 times for 878 yards and 11 touchdowns, averaging 7.4 yards per carry. He finished second on the team in rushing attempts and rushing yards and third in rushing touchdowns. He tied Cedric Benson for the school record for touchdowns by a freshman in a season with 11. He finished in the top 10 for freshman at Texas for touchdowns (11 for 2nd most), points (78 for 3rd most), 100-yard games (3 for 3rd most) and rushing yards (878 for 5ht most). He and Henry Melton set the school record for touchdowns, with 21, by a pair of freshman running backs and had the 2nd most yards.

At the end of the season he was named 2nd-team All-Big 12.

==== 2006 season ====
In the 2006 season, the Longhorns' rushing offense dropped significantly from the prior year going from 274.9 yards per game to 162.6 yards per game. Despite the down year for the rushing offense and sharing the backfield with Selvin Young, Charles's production remained consistent compared to his freshman year. He went over 100 rushing yards once, which was against in-state rival Rice in the Longhorns' third game, a 52–7 victory. He found the endzone on the ground twice on November 11 against Kansas State in a 45–42 loss. He had a 72-yard touchdown reception from quarterback Colt McCoy, which was the 4th longest reception in school history and the 5th longest offensive play in a bowl game in school history at the time, in the 2006 Alamo Bowl 26–24 victory over Iowa. Overall, he finished with 831 rushing yards, seven rushing touchdowns, 18 receptions, 183 receiving yards, and one receiving touchdown.

He was named 2nd Team Academic All-Big 12 and was named 2nd Team All-Big 12 by the media.

==== 2007 season ====
In the summer prior to the 2007 season, some observers believed he was the fastest college running back in the upcoming season. CBS SportsLine said, "Track star Jamaal Charles has the potential at running back to enjoy a break-out season and possesses the kind of breakaway speed that lead to an 80-yard rush and a 70-yard catch last season." Athlon Sports remarked, "Over the last two years, running back Jamaal Charles has run for 1,702 yards at 6.2 yards per carry with 18 touchdowns despite starting only four games. He has the job to himself and should have a breakout year."

In 2007, Charles rushed for 1,619 yards, with an average of 6.3 yards per carry. Charles started the season with 27 carries for 112 rushing yards and a touchdown in a 21–13 victory over Arkansas State. In the next game, a 34–13 victory over rival TCU, he had 22 carries for 134 rushing yards and a rushing touchdown. In the next game, a 35–32 away victory at Central Florida, he had 22 carries for 153 rushing yards and a rushing touchdown, which put the Longhorns up by two possessions late in the game. In the next game, he had 14 carries for 72 rushing yards and three rushing touchdowns in a 58–14 victory over Rice. Despite his successes early in the season, Mack Brown and Greg Davis hinted that Charles could face less playing time as a result of his fumbling problems. Charles said that he felt a deep remorse over his fumbles and felt that he is the biggest reason the team lost to the Oklahoma Sooners in the 2007 Red River Shootout. Texas running backs coach Ken Rucker and former Longhorn running back Earl Campbell both worked with Charles on his ball handling. Greg Davis said he wanted to get the ball to Charles "in space", on pitches and passes, instead of in heavy traffic up the center.

On October 28, 2007, Charles rushed 33 times for 290 yards in the 28–25 victory, the most ever against the Nebraska Cornhuskers and the fourth-highest total in Texas Longhorns history; and was named the Big 12 Offensive Player of the week. His 216 yards in the fourth quarter were just six shy of the NCAA record for a single quarter set by the University of Washington Huskies's Corey Dillon in 1996; and included an 86-yard touchdown run that was the 5th longest run in school history at the time. For these accomplishments, Charles won a fan vote for AT&T All-America Player of the Week. He followed that up with 16 carries for 180 rushing yards and three rushing touchdowns in a 38–35 victory over Oklahoma State.

On November 10, against rival Texas Tech, he had 23 carries for 174 rushing yards and a rushing touchdown in the 59–43 victory. Against Texas A&M, he had a 62 yard reception that was the 8th longest in school history at the time.

In the Holiday Bowl against Arizona State, he had 27 carries for 161 rushing yards and two rushing touchdowns in the 52–34 victory. It was the 5th best bowl game rushing yard total in school history at the time.

He was named 1st team All-Big 12 and the team's Co-MVP along with quarterback Colt McCoy.

Charles decided to forgo his senior season with Texas in favor of joining the NFL as a professional football player in the 2008 NFL draft. This decision came after earlier statements that he would stay with Texas. In November, Charles said he would return for his senior season rather than enter professional football in the NFL. Sources reported in December 2007 that Charles and fellow Longhorn Jermichael Finley had filed paperwork with the NFL to evaluate how high they might be drafted if they decided enter professional football in the NFL Draft instead of returning for their senior season. Mack Brown did not comment about specific players but said, "We always try to help our guys get as much information as possible when it comes to the NFL. We encourage and help them go through the process... All of our underclassmen have told us they will be coming back, but if you're playing well enough to be considered an NFL prospect, going through the process can only help you better understand it and realize what you need to work on to improve your status." Charles said he would not go pro unless he was predicted to be chosen in the first round of the draft. After the Holiday Bowl, Charles said, "Right now, I'm probably coming back. I didn't think I did that good in the game. Next year maybe I'll be up for the Heisman. I will come back." From 2000 to 2007, the Longhorns had seven players taken in the Top 10 draft picks by the NFL, more than any other school. On January 2, Charles announced he received and was happy with the results of his draft evaluation and that he would declare for the draft.

That season he had the 5th most single season rushing yards, 5th most single-season touchdowns, 5th most 100 yard-rushing games in a season and 9th most points scored in school history, and he led the Big 12 in rushing yards.

Despite skipping his senior year, Charles ranked fourth in the list of total-rushing yards by a Texas player, behind Ricky Williams, Cedric Benson, and Earl Campbell, with 3,328 yards; 5th for most touchdowns with 36; 6th for 100 yard rushing games; 8th for 200 yard rushing games, and 10th for points scored. Williams and Campbell each won the Heisman Trophy in their senior season.

=== Track ===
In college he ran track during his freshman year, competing in both the indoor and outdoor seasons. On March 11, 2006, Charles placed fourth in the NCAA 60-meter indoor track and field championship finals. On May 14, 2006, Charles captured his first conference title and the third Big 12 100-meter title for Texas by winning the event in 10.23 at the Big 12 outdoor meet. He led the 200 meter race after the preliminary round but elected not to participate in the final, as Texas had the Big 12 team title well in hand.

On June 10, at the NCAA outdoor competition, Charles took fifth place in the 100 meter finals, edging out UTEP's stand-out sprinter Churandy Martina (sixth place), who earlier in the year ran a 9.76 (wind-aided) 100-meters. Charles also placed seventh in the 200 meter finals, and ran the third leg of the 4 × 100 Texas Longhorn relay team, earning a fifth place in the finals. Charles's efforts helped the Longhorns earn a third place showing for the men's track and field team, the highest since a second-place finish at the 1997 NCAA finals. He also ran the 60m in 6.65 seconds, an indoor time only beaten by two other performers in school history at the time.

In early 2007 Charles elected not to run indoor track to focus on strength-training and being around football teammates, but kept open the idea of coming back for the outdoor season. In the outdoor season, he did well enough to qualify in the 100 and 200 for 2007 Big 12 Outdoor Track and Field Championships where he finished 2nd in the 100 and 10th in the 4x100. He also ran fast enough to qualify for the 2007 NCAA Track & Field Mideast Regional Championships.

He completed his collegiate track career as a four-time All-American (60m indoor, 100m outdoor, 200m outdoor, 4 × 100 m relay outdoor).

==== Personal bests ====
Event	Time (seconds)	Venue	Date
60 meters	6.65	Fayetteville, Arkansas	March 10, 2006
100 meters	10.13	Austin, Texas	May 27, 2006
200 meters	20.62	Austin, Texas	April 22, 2006

Charles was inducted into the University of Texas Hall of Honor in 2020.

== Professional career ==
Pre-draft measurables
Height	Weight	Arm length	Hand span	40-yard dash	10-yard split	20-yard split	20-yard shuttle	Three-cone drill	Vertical jump	Broad jump
5 ft 11 in (1.80 m)	200 lb (91 kg)	32 1/8 in (0.82 m)	8 3/4 in (0.22 m)	4.38 s	1.53 s	2.56 s	4.22 s	6.80 s	30 1/2 in (0.77 m)	10 ft 2 in (3.10 m)
All values from NFL Combine

=== Kansas City Chiefs ===
==== 2008 season ====
The Kansas City Chiefs selected Charles in the third round of the 2008 NFL draft with the 73rd overall pick, acquired from the Minnesota Vikings in the Jared Allen trade. He was the ninth running back to be selected that year. Charles thought he would go early in the second round but said he had no regrets about leaving college early. Charles was expected to begin his career as the Chiefs' No. 3 back behind Larry Johnson and Kolby Smith.

In his NFL debut, Charles started the game and rushed for 28 yards on five carries and had two receptions for six yards in the 17–10 loss to the New England Patriots in Week 1. In Week 9, with Larry Johnson out, Charles had 18 carries for 106 rushing yards in a 30–27 loss to the Tampa Bay Buccaneers. In Week 12, against the Buffalo Bills, Charles had his first professional touchdown on a 36-yard reception from quarterback Tyler Thigpen in the 54–31 loss. In Week 16, Charles had three catches for 102 receiving yards, including a 75-yard reception to help set up a Larry Johnson rushing touchdown, against the Miami Dolphins in the 38–31 loss. In Charles's rookie season, he ended with 67 carries for 357 rushing yards for a 5.3 yards per carry average. In addition, he had 27 receptions for 272 receiving yards and a receiving touchdown.

==== 2009 season ====
In the first six games of the 2009 season, Charles saw a limited role with 23 carries for 116 rushing yards and 14 receptions for 120 receiving yards to go along with kick return duties. During Week 9 of the 2009 NFL season, Larry Johnson was released and Charles was promoted to first-string but split carries with Kolby Smith. In limited action against the Jacksonville Jaguars in Week 9, Charles managed 36 yards on only six carries for a six-yard per carry average. During Week 10, against the Oakland Raiders, Charles ran for 103 yards on 18 carries including a 44-yard touchdown run, the Chiefs first rushing touchdown of the year and the first rushing touchdown of Charles's professional career, in the 16–10 victory. In Week 11, in a 27–24 overtime victory over the Pittsburgh Steelers, Charles returned the opening kickoff 97 yards for a touchdown. He went on to have 17 carries for 58 rushing yards and had a two-yard reception for a touchdown. Charles became the fourth player in franchise history to have a receiving touchdown and a kickoff return touchdown in the same game. Charles was named AFC Special Teams Player of the Week. In Week 14, against the Buffalo Bills, Charles ran for a 76-yard touchdown, one of the longest runs in Chiefs history, as part of a 20-carry, 143-rushing yard performance. In Week 15, against the Cleveland Browns, he had 25 carries for 154 rushing yards and one rushing touchdown in the 41–34 loss. In Week 16, in a 17–10 loss to the Cincinnati Bengals, he had 24 carries for 102 rushing yards. In Week 17, on the road against the Denver Broncos, Charles rushed for a career-high 259 yards on 25 carries, scoring two rushing touchdowns and breaking the Chiefs' single-game rushing record, in the 44–24 victory. Charles became only the fourth player in NFL history to run for over 250 yards in a single game while averaging over 10 yards a carry. On the season, he became the only player in NFL history to rush for 1,100 or more yards in 200 or fewer carries.

==== 2010 season ====
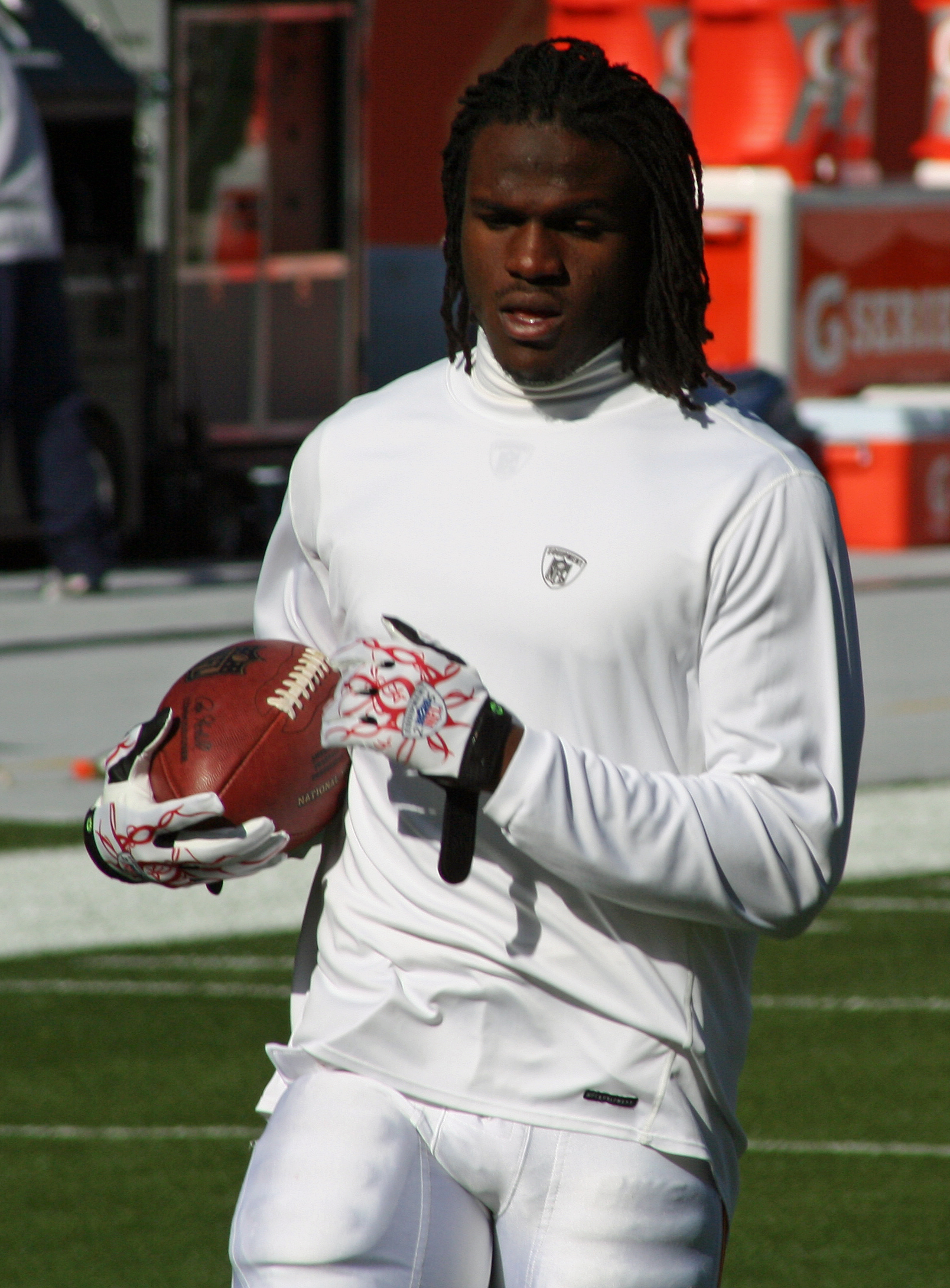
Charles in 2010.

In the 2010 season, Charles shared the majority of backfield carries with Thomas Jones. The Chiefs opened up the 2010 season with a 21–14 win over their division rival, the San Diego Chargers. In that game, Charles played a pivotal role, including a 56-yard rushing score. On October 31, against the Buffalo Bills, he had 22 carries for 177 rushing yards in the 13–10 victory. On November 28, against the Seattle Seahawks, he had 22 carries for 173 rushing yards and a rushing touchdown in the 42–24 victory. In the following game, he had 136 scrimmage yards in the 10–6 victory over the Denver Broncos. In Week 15, against the St. Louis Rams, he had 153 scrimmage yards and a rushing touchdown in the 27–13 victory. Charles finished the season with 1,467 rushing yards and five rushing touchdowns on only 230 carries. In addition, he had 45 receptions for 468 receiving yards and three receiving touchdowns. He was voted to his first career Pro Bowl. His 6.38 yards per carry average for the season was (and still is as of 2025) the second-highest average for a running back in NFL history, second only to Hall of Famer Jim Brown, only two one-hundredths of a yard off of the record pace set by the Browns legend.

On December 11, 2010, the Chiefs reached an agreement with Charles on a five-year, $32.5 million deal that included $13 million guaranteed. Charles made his postseason debut in the Wild Card Round against the Baltimore Ravens. He had nine carries for 82 rushing yards and a rushing touchdown in the 30–7 loss. In the 2011 Pro Bowl, Charles rushed for 72-yards on 10 carries and scored one touchdown. Charles was honored for his performance in the 2010 season by being selected to his first AP All-Pro team. On the NFL Network's Top 100 Players of 2011, Charles was ranked the 33rd by his fellow players and was also one of the youngest players on the list.

==== 2011 season ====
During the 2011 NFL Lockout that occurred in the offseason, Charles considered a return to track if it continued into the season.

Charles's 2011 season was short lived. In Week 2, against the Detroit Lions, he suffered an ACL injury. Chiefs head coach Todd Haley confirmed the next day that Charles would miss the remainder of the 2011 season. He was officially placed on injured reserve on September 19.

==== 2012 season ====
Coming off of an ACL injury in 2011, Charles had an All-Pro caliber season, running for 1,509 yards and five touchdowns. Once again, Charles proved to be very efficient running the ball as he managed a 5.3 yard per carry average on the year. In the season opening 40–24 loss to the Atlanta Falcons, he had 87 rushing yards on 16 carries in his first action back from injury.

In Week 3 against the New Orleans Saints, Charles ran a career-high 33 times for 233 rushing yards, scored a rushing touchdown, and caught six passes for 55 yards to earn his first AFC Offensive Player of the Week nod. Charles became the first player in franchise history to rush for at least 200 rushing yards and have at least 50 receiving yards in the same game. His 91-yard rushing touchdown in the third quarter was the longest rushing play in franchise history, a feat later tied by Damien Williams in the 2019 season.

In Week 5 against Baltimore Ravens, Charles had 31 carries for 140 rushing yards in the 9–6 loss. However, in Week 8, Charles carried the ball only five times for four rushing yards in a 26–16 loss to the Oakland Raiders. When asked the reason why, head coach Romeo Crennel said "Now, that I'm not exactly sure, either."

Starting In Week 10 against the Pittsburgh Steelers, Charles reeled off a stretch where he had over 100 scrimmage yards, including 165 rushing yards against the Cleveland Browns, in five consecutive games. In a 20–13 loss to the Indianapolis Colts in Week 16, Charles carried the ball 22 times for 226 rushing yards and a rushing touchdown. He became the second player in franchise history, joining Larry Johnson, to record two games with at least 200 rushing yards in a single season. Charles's performance was his second career game with over 200 rushing yards while averaging more than ten yards a carry. He became only the second player in NFL history to accomplish the feat, after Adrian Peterson, who accomplished his feat in the 2012 season as well. Charles carried the ball at least 20 times in six games, and in each of those games managed at least 100 yards. This has been a trend throughout his entire career, in every game he has carried the ball 20 times, he has gained at least 100 yards. On December 23, 2012, following his qualifying 750th career carry, Charles broke NFL legend Jim Brown's 47-year-old all-time average yards per carry record of 5.22 with an average of 5.82. He was named to his second Pro Bowl as a result of his successful season. On the NFL Top 100 Players of 2013, he was ranked 20th by his peers

==== 2013 season ====
Charles started the 2013 season with scoring at least one touchdown in each of the first seven games. In Weeks 12 and 14, he went over 150 scrimmage yards and scored two touchdowns in both games against the San Diego Chargers and Washington Redskins.

On December 15, in the second divisional game against the Oakland Raiders in Week 15, Charles had eight receptions for 195 receiving yards, eight carries for 20 rushing yards, and five total touchdowns (four receiving, one rushing) in a 56–31 Chiefs victory. Charles's performance made him the first Chiefs player to score five touchdowns in a game since Abner Haynes accomplished the feat for the Dallas Texans in 1961. He became the first player in NFL history to have four touchdown receptions and one rushing touchdown in a single game. He scored 30 total fantasy points in the game, which was tied with for the most by any player in a single game in the 2013 season, and earned AFC Offensive Player of the Week honors. Charles's performance was only the 11th game in NFL history where a player accounted for at least 30 points, the first since Clinton Portis accomplished the feat against the Chiefs in 2003. His 195 receiving yards were the fourth-most for a running back in a single game in NFL history and the most since Marshall Faulk had 204 against the Chicago Bears in 1999.

Overall, Charles finished the 2013 season with 259 carries for 1,287 rushing yards and 12 rushing touchdowns to go along with 70 receptions for 693 receiving yards and seven receiving touchdowns. Charles ended up leading the team in targets, receptions, receiving yards, and receiving touchdowns. His 12 rushing touchdowns tied with Marshawn Lynch for the league lead. In the Chiefs' Wild Card Round game against the Indianapolis Colts, Charles recorded three carries for 18 rushing yards before having to leave the 45–44 loss with a concussion in the first quarter.

Charles earned First-team All-Pro honors for the second time in his career. He was named to his second consecutive and third career Pro Bowl. He was ranked as the eighth best player in the NFL on the NFL Top 100 Players of 2014.

==== 2014 season ====
On July 23, 2014, one day after threatening to hold out of training camp, Charles agreed to a two-year, $18.1 million extension making him one of the top five highest paid running backs in the NFL. On September 14, 2014, Charles suffered a high ankle sprain in Week 2 against the Denver Broncos. On September 29, against the New England Patriots, he had 18 carries for 92 rushing yards and a rushing touchdown in the 41–14 victory to earn AFC Offensive Player of the Week honors. On October 19, against the San Diego Chargers, Charles passed Priest Holmes's mark of 6,070 rushing yards to become the all-time leading rusher for the Chiefs. In the next game, he had 67 rushing yards and two rushing touchdowns in the 34–7 victory over the St. Louis Rams. On November 16, against the Seattle Seahawks, he had 159 rushing yards and two rushing touchdowns in the 24–20 victory. On December 7, against the Arizona Cardinals, he had 111 scrimmage yards and two total touchdowns in the 17–14 loss. Overall, he finished the 2014 season with 1,033 rushing yards, nine rushing touchdowns, 40 receptions, 291 receiving yards, and five receiving touchdowns. He tied for the team lead in receiving touchdowns, with Travis Kelce, for the second time in his career. He was named to his third consecutive Pro Bowl for the 2014 season. He was ranked 12th by his fellow players on the NFL Top 100 Players of 2015.

==== 2015 season ====
In the season opener against the Houston Texans, Charles had recorded 103 scrimmage yards and a receiving touchdown in the 27–20 victory. Four days later, against the Denver Broncos, he had 125 rushing yards and a rushing touchdown in the 24–31 loss. In the loss, he had a key fumble late in the game that was returned for a touchdown by Bradley Roby and gave the Broncos the winning points. In the next game, a 28–38 loss to the Green Bay Packers, he had 11 carries for 49 rushing yards and a career-high three rushing touchdowns. On October 11, Charles tore his ACL in his right knee in a Week 5 game against the Chicago Bears. He was placed on injured reserve ending his season. Despite the injury, Charles was still ranked 75th by his fellow players on the NFL Top 100 Players of 2016.

==== 2016 season ====
Heading into the 2016 season, Charles never fully recovered from his torn ACL suffered the previous season. He returned to the field in Week 5 and played in three games, recording 40 rushing yards and a rushing touchdown along with two receptions for 14 yards. He suffered a setback with his knee prior to Week 8 and needed a second knee surgery to trim his meniscus. He was placed on injured reserve on November 1, 2016.

On February 28, 2017, Charles was released by the Chiefs.

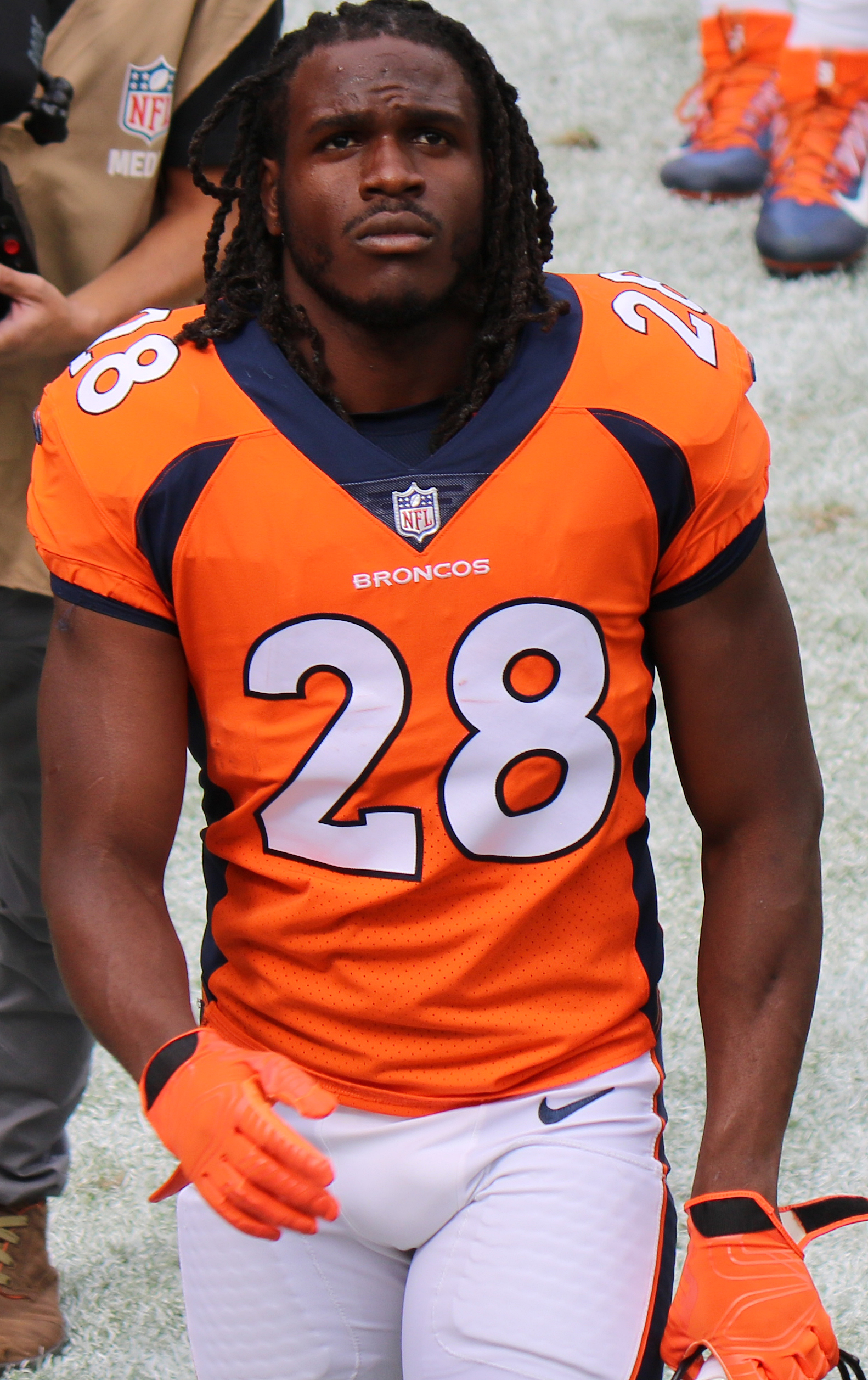
Charles with the Denver Broncos in 2017

=== Denver Broncos ===
On May 2, 2017, Charles signed a one-year, $3.75 million contract with the Denver Broncos. He was part of a backfield rotation that was shared with C. J. Anderson and Devontae Booker. In the season opener against the Los Angeles Chargers, Charles had 10 rushes for 40 yards but lost a fumble in the 24–21 victory. In Week 3, in a 26–16 loss to the Buffalo Bills, he scored his lone rushing touchdown of the season. In 14 games, he had 296 rushing yards, one rushing touchdown, 23 receptions, and 129 receiving yards.

=== Jacksonville Jaguars ===
Charles signed with the Jacksonville Jaguars on October 9, 2018. He was released on October 22, 2018. He played in two games with the Jaguars in the 2018 season and only totaled six carries for seven rushing yards and two receptions for seven receiving yards.

=== Retirement ===
On May 1, 2019, Charles retired after signing a one-day contract with the Chiefs. After signing the ceremonial contract, he went to the practice field for a ceremonial "last carry", which he took from Patrick Mahomes.

In September 2023, Charles was nominated for the Pro Football Hall of Fame in his first year of eligibility. He was nominated again in 2024 and 2025.

In 2024, he was inducted into the Texas Sports Hall of Fame.

== Career statistics ==
=== NFL ===
Legend
	Led the league
**Bold**	Career high

==== Regular season ====
Year	Team	Games		Rushing					Receiving					Kick returns					Fumbles	
Year	Team	GP	GS	Att	Yds	Avg	Lng	TD	Rec	Yds	Avg	Lng	TD	Ret	Yds	Avg	Lng	TD	Fum	Lost
2008	KC	16	2	67	357	5.3	30	0	27	272	10.1	**75**	1	15	321	21.4	40	0	2	2
2009	KC	15	10	190	1,120	5.9	76T	7	40	297	7.4	49	1	**36**	**925**	**25.7**	**97T**	**1**	4	**3**
2010	KC	16	6	230	1,467	6.4	80	5	45	468	**10.4**	31	3	—	—	—	—	—	3	2
2011	KC	2	1	12	83	**6.9**	24	0	5	9	1.8	9	1	—	—	—	—	—	1	1
2012	KC	16	15	**285**	**1,509**	5.3	**91T**	5	35	236	6.7	22	1	—	—	—	—	—	**5**	**3**
2013	KC	15	15	259	1,287	5.0	46	**12**	**70**	**693**	9.9	71	**7**	—	—	—	—	—	4	2
2014	KC	15	15	206	1,033	5.0	63T	9	40	291	7.3	30	5	—	—	—	—	—	**5**	**3**
2015	KC	5	5	71	364	5.1	34T	4	21	177	8.4	26	1	—	—	—	—	—	3	2
2016	KC	3	0	12	40	3.3	17	1	2	14	7.0	16	0	—	—	—	—	—	0	0
2017	DEN	14	0	69	296	4.3	19	1	23	129	5.6	20	0	—	—	—	—	—	2	2
2018	JAX	2	0	6	7	1.2	5	0	2	7	3.5	5	0	—	—	—	—	—	0	0
Career		119	69	1,407	7,563	5.4	91T	44	310	2,593	8.4	75	20	51	1,246	24.4	97T	1	29	20

==== Playoffs ====
Year	Team	Games		Rushing					Receiving					Fumbles	
Year	Team	GP	GS	Att	Yds	Avg	Lng	TD	Rec	Yds	Avg	Lng	TD	Fum	Lost
2010	KC	1	0	**9**	**82**	**9.1**	**41**	**1**	**1**	**15**	**15.0**	**15**	0	**1**	**1**
2013	KC	1	1	3	18	6.0	7	0	0	0	0.0	0	0	0	0
2015	KC	0	0	Did not play due to injury											
2016	KC	0	0	Did not play due to injury											
Career		2	1	12	100	8.3	41	1	1	15	15.0	15	0	1	1

=== College ===
Season	Team	GP	Rushing				Receiving		
Season	Team	GP	Att	Yds	Avg	TD	Rec	Yds	TD
2005	Texas	13	119	878	7.4	11	14	157	2
2006	Texas	12	156	831	5.3	7	18	183	1
2007	Texas	13	258	1,619	6.3	18	17	199	0
Total		38	533	3,328	6.2	36	49	539	3

== Career highlights ==
=== Awards and honors ===
NFL

- 2× First-team All-Pro (2010, 2013)
- Second-team All-Pro (2012)
- 4× Pro Bowl (2010, 2012–2014)
- NFL rushing touchdowns leader (2013)
- FedEx Ground Player of the Year (2010)
- 5× NFL Top 100 — 33rd (2011), 20th (2013), 8th (2014), 12th (2015), 75th (2016)

College

- BCS national champion (2005)
- Big 12 Offensive Freshman of the Year (2005)
- First-team All-Big 12 (2007)
- Second-team All-Big 12 (2005)
- Rose Bowl Champion (2005)
- Holiday Bowl Champion (2007)
- Alamo Bowl Champion (2006)

Track and field

- 4× All-American in Track and Field
- Big 12 Outdoor champion, 100-meter dash (2006)

=== Records ===
==== NFL records ====
- Receiving touchdowns by a running back, single game: 4 (2013)
- Career yards-per-carry among running backs, minimum 1000 attempts (5.4)

==== Kansas City Chiefs records ====
- Longest rushing play from scrimmage: 91 (2013, tied)
- Career rushing yards (7,260)
- Rushing yards in a game: 259 (2010)
- Receiving touchdowns in a game: 4 (2013, tied)

== Later life ==
Charles found the transition to life after football difficult. He worked with investment people and it went poorly, causing him to become depressed and suicidal. He went into therapy, which helped. He retired to Austin with his wife Whitney, whom he met after a UT track meet in 2006, where he created the Jamaal Charles Family Foundation and got involved with Special Olympics and the Boys & Girls Club.
