= Ultimate Tag =

American game show

- Genre: Game show
- Created by: Natalka Znak
- Presented by: J. J. Watt; Derek Watt; T. J. Watt
- Opening theme: "Ladies and Gentlemen" by Saliva
- Country of origin: United States
- Original language: English
- No. of seasons: 1
- No. of episodes: 10

Production
- Executive producers: Conrad Green; Natalka Znak; Glenn Coomber; J. J. Watt
- Running time: 42 minutes
- Production companies: Znak & Co.; Fox Alternative Entertainment

Original release
- Network: Fox
- Release: May 20 – July 29, 2020

Ultimate Tag is an American sports entertainment obstacle course competition television series that aired on Fox from May 20 to July 29, 2020. The format is based on the game of tag and involves contestants running through various indoor obstacle courses while professional taggers attempt to catch them. It has similarities to parkour championship World Chase Tag and the game show American Gladiators. The show was hosted by J. J., Derek, and T. J. Watt.

== Gameplay ==
During each hour-long episode, two parallel contests take place - one among three men, the other among three women.

=== Round 1: Chase Tag ===
The three contestants run around a U-shaped course in an attempt to avoid three successive taggers, with the match adjudicated by a linesperson on the side of the course closest to the crowd. The contestants are released into the course with a 10-second head start (later reduced to 7) over the first tagger, who would stand 5 ft behind them. In episode 8, some of the new taggers in the men's match are released from the second floor of the course on the opposite end to stop contestants hiding in the far corner, thus increasing the difficulty of lasting the round. Taggers pursue the contestants in an effort to remove one of three LED-studded strips from them; it is deemed a "tag" when the tagger successfully removes one of these strips. When a contestant is tagged, that contestant is eliminated from the round, and that tagger exits the course and is replaced with the next tagger in line. The contestant who lasts the longest scores 3 points, with 2 points given to the second-place contestant, and 1 for third place. In addition, each contestant who is not tagged after 2 minutes earns a bonus point, and a further bonus point after every 30 seconds.

=== Round 2: Dodge Tag ===
The three contestants run through an obstacle course while trying to avoid two taggers placed in the middle of the course. The object for the contestants is to press one of the scoring buttons at the other end of the course without being tagged. Each time a contestant avoids being tagged and presses the scoring button, they earn 1 point. The contestant returns to the start of the course after each attempt, whether it is successful or not; if the contestant is tagged, they must obtain a replacement tag before continuing. This round lasts for two minutes, and the lowest-scoring contestant in each contest is eliminated at the end of this round. In the event of a tie, the contestant who scores the most in Dodge Tag breaks the tie.

=== Round 3 ===
There are two different games that take place in this round. The men play one, while the women play the other (except episode 7 onwards). One game will be shown during the episode, while the other game is shown in recap form following a commercial break. Which pair plays which game and which game is shown in full changes from episode to episode.

==== Dome Tag ====
===== Layout =====
Dome Tag takes place on a two-tiered, dome-shaped jungle gym that hangs 30 feet (approximately nine meters) above the ground. It is designed so that participants may crawl around inside the upper and lower tiers of the dome, climb around the top of the dome, and even swing from the bars that line the bottom. Instead of participants wearing harnesses, there is a giant air cushion below the dome to catch them when they either intentionally or unintentionally fall.

===== Format =====
Contestants compete one at a time. Each contestant tries to evade three taggers—one tagger at a time—for as long as possible. Once a tagger removes one of the tags from the contestant, they jump from the dome and the next tagger climbs down a ladder and enters the dome. The contestant's round ends when either all three tags have been removed or the contestant falls off the dome. The contestant that lasts longer earns three points; the other contestant scores two. As in "Chase Tag," a bonus point is awarded for lasting two minutes, and a second bonus point for lasting two minutes and 30 seconds, but will not gain any more bonus points thereafter. In the event that a tagger falls or retires from the dome without tagging the contestant, another tagger is released.

==== Revenge Tag ====
Each contestant, in turn, runs around a maze in an effort to evade one tagger. The contestant that evades their tagger for a longer time earns 3 points, the other scores 2. If there is a tie, both players will receive 3 points. However, if a contestants survives for longer than 2 minutes, a second tagger will enter the maze. Located around different parts of the maze are towers with a button on both sides. Only one or two towers are active at a time and whichever are active can freely change throughout the round. If the contestant hits a button on the active tower, they will have 10 seconds to attempt to tag their tagger(s) (who wear yellow tags for this game). If they succeed, a bonus point is awarded and the tagger is replaced. When a tagger is tagged during a two-on-one revenge, the replacement enters the game 10 seconds after the point is added on screen, and 12 seconds after the tag overall.

=== Final Round: The Ultimate Showdown ===
The Showdown consists of a two-part obstacle course; the first part is several obstacles on the floor of the arena, and the second is a climb up a tower known as the "Summit." The first tagger is not released into the course until the contestant completes the first obstacle; the second tagger starts at the top of the "Summit" and enters play once the contestant enters that section of the course. Unlike in previous rounds, there are two tags on the contestant; for each tag the contestant loses, a 5-second penalty is added to their final time. Once a tagger has tagged a contestant, they may not tag that contestant again during this round; in addition, each tagger is restricted to their own portion of the course, i.e., if the contestant reaches the "Summit" section, the first tagger may no longer tag the contestant. The contestant must negotiate the course and press a plunger at the top of the "Summit" to stop the clock. The clock shows the time before pre-game time advantages, but after time penalties. There is a second referee situated at the second level of the course before the contestant climb to the top.

The contestant with the lower score goes first, and at the end of their run, one second is added to their time for every point they were trailing by at the start of this round. The second contestant tries to beat this adjusted time. The contestant with the faster time, after adjustments, wins $10,000.

If the contestants are tied, a coin toss will determine who goes first.

In all matches, if a contestant is unable to compete before the start of a new round, the eliminated player from the second round will take their place, and inherits all of the injured opponent's points and stats. In all the matches, if the contestant is injured in any case, the tagger cannot continue the tag, and the games are halted. If a contestant is injured during the round, the opponent wins by default.

== Taggers ==
- Lorena Abreu as Atomic Ant
- Carrie Bernans as Banshee
- Yessenia Cossio as Dynamite
- Ruel DaCosta as Bulldog
- Julian Daigre as Rocket
- Travis DesLaurier as Beach Boy
- Brooke Ence as The Boss
- Ross Forte as Viking
- Zac Gordon as Horse
- Caitlin Hutson as Flame
- Jesse La Flair as La Flair
- Tavon McVey as The Flow
- Laura Micetich as The Iron Giantess
- Sydney Olson as Spitfire
- Austin Raye as Big Deal
- Corbin Reinhardt as The Kid
- Josh Yadon as Caveman
- Omar Zaki as Geek

== Broadcast ==
In addition to airing on Fox in the United States, the series is simulcasted by CTV in Canada, and was subsequently picked up by Family Channel.

On October 1, 2020, New Zealand's TV3 broadcast the US series.

=== International versions ===
==== Australia ====
In July 2020, it was announced that Australia’s Seven Network had purchased the rights to the series and would will making their own version of the show for Australian audiences in 2021. Auditions were open between July and August 2020. The series was officially confirmed by Seven at their annual upfronts in October 2020, to be produced by Endemol Shine Australia and hosted by Abbey Gelmi and Matt Shirvington with Bill Woods as commentator. It premiered on 7 March 2021, but was cancelled after one season due to low ratings.

==== Russia ====
In August 2020, Russian TV station sent out a casting call for a production starting in Russia.

== Ratings ==
Viewership and ratings per episode of Ultimate Tag
No.	Title	Air date	Rating/share (18–49)	Viewers (millions)	DVR (18–49)	DVR viewers (millions)	Total (18–49)	Total viewers (millions)	Ref.
1	"You Better Run!"	May 20, 2020	1.3/7	4.35	0.3	0.98	1.6	5.33	
2	"Real Men Do Cry"	May 27, 2020	0.6/3	2.08	0.2	0.63	0.8	2.70	
3	"Girls Just Wanna Run"	June 3, 2020	0.5/3	1.73	0.2	0.49	0.7	2.22	
4	"Every Second Counts"	June 10, 2020	0.5/3	1.84	0.2	0.50	0.7	2.34	
5	"Breaking All Records"	June 17, 2020	0.4/2	1.57	0.1	0.45	0.6	2.02	
6	"No One's Faster Than The Flow"	June 24, 2020	0.5/3	1.58	0.1	0.42	0.6	2.00	
7	"Higher, Better, Faster, Stronger"	July 8, 2020	0.5/3	1.52	0.1	0.34	0.6	1.86	
8	"Only the Toughest Endure"	July 15, 2020	0.3/2	1.16	0.1	0.30	0.4	1.46	
9	"Never Stop"	July 22, 2020	0.3/2	1.15	0.1	0.30	0.4	1.45	
10	"Dangerously Fast"	July 29, 2020	0.4/2	1.15	0.1	0.34	0.4	1.49	

== See also ==
- World Chase Tag
- Ultimate Kho Kho
