= J. J. Watt =

American football player and television analyst (born 1989)

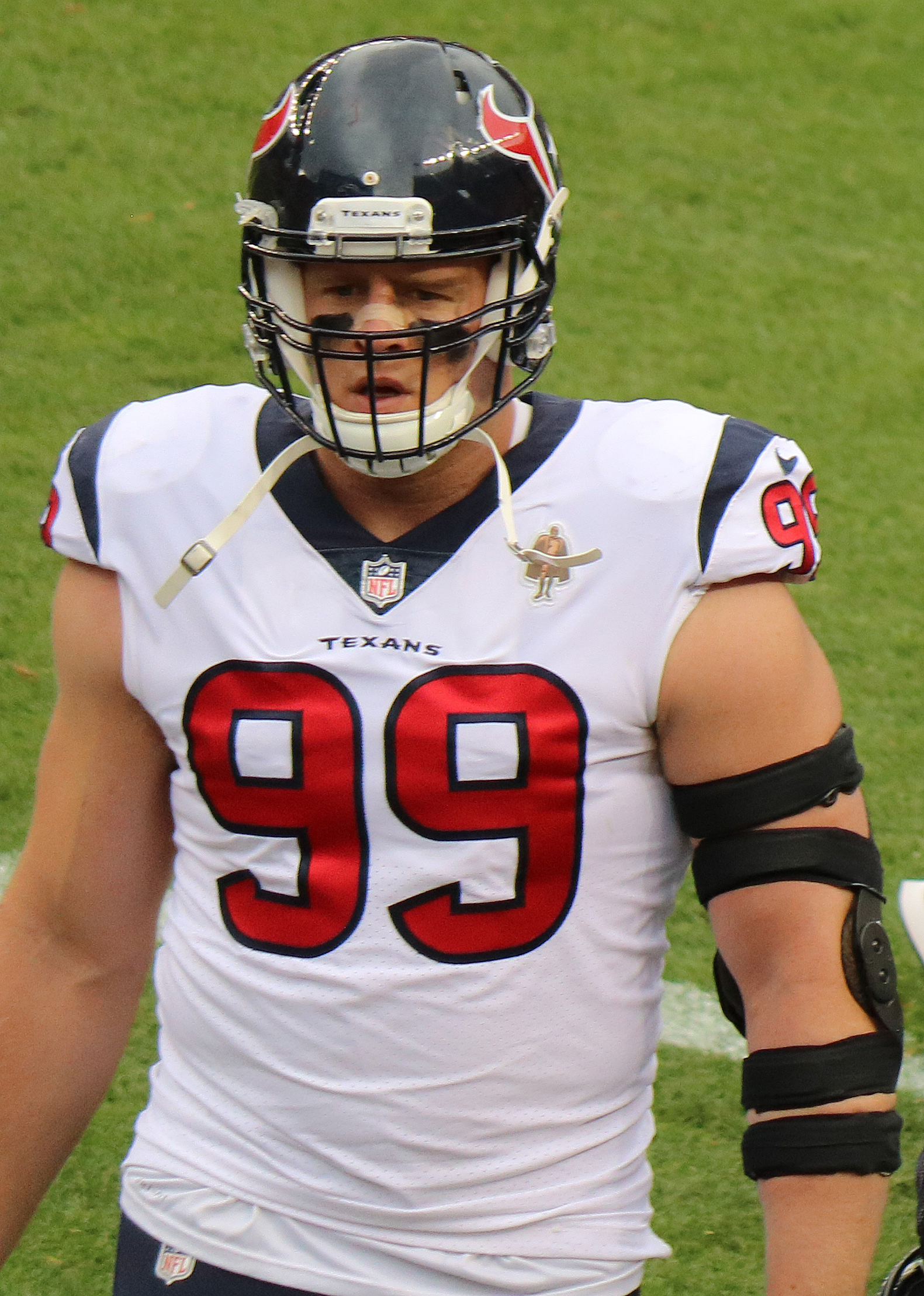
- Watt with the Houston Texans in 2018

No. 99
- Position: Defensive end

Personal information
- Born: March 22, 1989 (age 37); Pewaukee, Wisconsin, U.S.
- Listed height: 6 ft 5 in (1.96 m)
- Listed weight: 288 lb (131 kg)

Career information
- High school: Pewaukee
- College: Central Michigan (2007); Wisconsin (2008–2010)
- NFL draft: 2011: 1st round, 11th overall pick

Career history
- Houston Texans (2011–2020); Arizona Cardinals (2021–2022)

Awards and highlights
- 3× NFL Defensive Player of the Year (2012, 2014, 2015); Walter Payton NFL Man of the Year (2017); 5× First-team All-Pro (2012–2015, 2018); 2× Second-team All-Pro (2014 (Note: Selected as a defensive tackle), 2018 (Note: Selected as an interior lineman)); 5× Pro Bowl (2012–2015, 2018); 2× NFL sacks leader (2012, 2015); NFL forced fumbles co-leader (2018); NFL 2010s All-Decade Team; Sports Illustrated Sportsman of the Year (2017); Bert Bell Award (2014); PFWA All-Rookie Team (2011); Houston Texans Ring of Honor; Lott Trophy (2010); First-team All-American (2010); NFL record: Seasons with 20+ sacks: 2; Most tackles for loss in a season: 39

Career NFL statistics
- Total tackles: 586
- Sacks: 114.5
- Pass deflections: 70
- Forced fumbles: 27
- Fumble recoveries: 17
- Stats at Pro Football Reference

Justin James Watt (born March 22, 1989) is an American former professional football player who was a defensive end in the National Football League (NFL) for 12 seasons, for the Houston Texans and Arizona Cardinals. He played college football for the Central Michigan Chippewas and Wisconsin Badgers and was selected by the Texans in the first round of the 2011 NFL draft.

Watt received the AP NFL Defensive Player of the Year Award three times in his first five seasons. Watt's position was primarily defensive end. He also took snaps on offense, catching three touchdown passes in 2014. Watt holds the Texans franchise records for sacks and forced fumbles. In 2017, Sports Illustrated named him its Sportsman of the Year. Watt is regarded as one of the greatest defensive players in NFL history.

After retiring in 2022, Watt joined CBS Sports, working initially as a studio analyst on The NFL Today and then joining Ian Eagle on the network's #2 game announcing team in 2025, and later Jim Nantz on the network's #1 game announcing team in 2026 after Tony Romo was placed on leave and parted ways with CBS Sports after his arrest for operating while intoxicated. Watt is the older brother of Derek Watt and T. J. Watt.

== Early life ==
Watt was born in Pewaukee, Wisconsin, to parents Connie, a building operations vice president, and John, a firefighter. Both of his younger brothers also went on to play in the NFL. Derek Watt was a fullback and T. J. Watt plays outside linebacker for the Pittsburgh Steelers. Watt played ice hockey from age four to 13 and played for travel or competitive teams that traveled to Canada and Germany. He gave up hockey when weekly games started to conflict with his schedule and for financial reasons. Watt also played football throughout his childhood and became passionate about the sport while he was in the fifth grade.

Watt attended Pewaukee High School, where he was a four-year letter-winner in football and also lettered in basketball, baseball, and track and field. Watt earned the Woodland Conference Player of the Year Award as a senior, and first-team All-State, All-County, All-Area, and All-Conference selections as tight end and defensive end. He was also named the team's MVP. During his senior year, Watt recorded 26 receptions for 399 yards and five touchdowns.

Watt followed in his father's footsteps and competed in the shot put during his senior season, earning first-team All-state selection. Watt captured the state title in the shot put at the 2007 WIAA Division II Championship, setting a new school record with a throw of 59 ft, 11.5 in (18.28 meters).

Regarded as a two-star recruit by both Rivals.com and Scout.com, Watt was ranked among neither the top tight end nor the top defensive end prospects in his class. After official visits to Central Michigan, Colorado, and Minnesota, Watt chose to play at Central Michigan under coach Butch Jones.

College recruiting
Name	Hometown	School	Height	Weight	40^{‡}	Commit date
J. J. Watt; Defensive end	Pewaukee, WI	Pewaukee HS	6 ft 5 in (1.96 m)	220 lb (100 kg)	4.70	Jan 30, 2007
J. J. Watt; Defensive end	Recruit ratings: Scout: Rivals: (63)					
Overall recruit ranking: Scout: NR Rivals: NR ESPN: 172 (DE)
Note: In many cases, Scout, Rivals, 247Sports, On3, and ESPN may conflict in their listings of height and weight.; In these cases, the average was taken. ESPN grades are on a 100-point scale.; Sources: "Central Michigan Football Commitments". Rivals.; "2007 Central Michigan Football Commits". Scout.; "ESPN". ESPN.; "Scout.com Team Recruiting Rankings". Scout.; "2007 Team Ranking". Rivals.com.

== College career ==
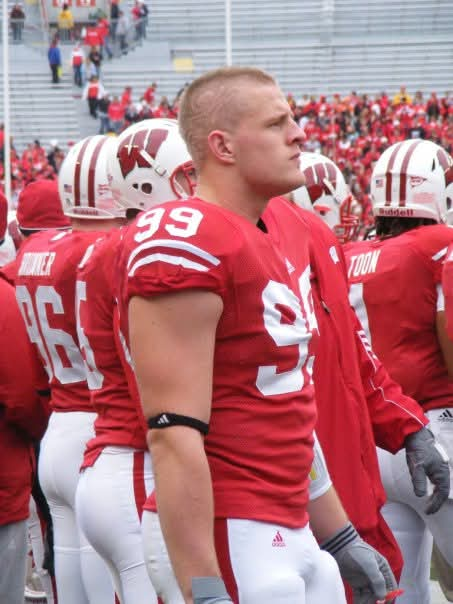
Watt on the sidelines at Camp Randall Stadium in 2010

=== Central Michigan ===
Watt received a scholarship offer from Central Michigan University. He has stated that he was led to believe by Butch Jones that, as a tight end, he would have the opportunity to score touchdowns. He played 14 games with the Chippewas, compiling 77 receiving yards and 8 receptions. Watt's coaches, led by Jones, suggested that he move to offensive tackle, but Watt decided to forgo his starting spot and scholarship to walk-on the University of Wisconsin–Madison, where he played as a defensive end.

=== Wisconsin ===
At the University of Wisconsin–Madison, Watt redshirted the 2008 season and was named Wisconsin's Scout Team Player of the Year. In 2009, he played in 13 games as a defensive end for the Badgers. In a game against the Hawaii Warriors on December 5, Watt had a career-high of two sacks, three tackles for loss, six tackles, and one quarterback hurry. Watt finished the season with 32 solo tackles, 12 assisted tackles, four and a half sacks, 15.5 tackles for loss, and five passes defended. He also earned his first letter. On November 20, 2010, against the Michigan Wolverines, he recorded his first collegiate interception. Overall, in the 2010 season, Watt played in 13 games and led the team in tackles for loss, quarterback hurries, blocked kicks, and forced fumbles. He finished the season with 42 solo tackles, 20 assisted tackles, 21 tackles for loss, seven sacks, one interception for 15 yards, nine passes defended, and three fumbles forced. He earned the Lott Trophy in 2010, voted AP and Sports Illustrated second-team All-American, All-Big Ten first-team, academic All-Big Ten, and was voted the team's MVP.

== Professional career ==
=== Pre-draft ===
Pre-draft measurables
Height	Weight	Arm length	Hand span	Wingspan	40-yard dash	10-yard split	20-yard split	20-yard shuttle	Three-cone drill	Vertical jump	Broad jump	Bench press	Wonderlic
6 ft 5 3/8 in (1.97 m)	290 lb (132 kg)	34 in (0.86 m)	11 1/8 in (0.28 m)	6 ft 10 1/2 in (2.10 m)	4.84 s	1.71 s	2.85 s	4.21 s	6.88 s	37 in (0.94 m)	10 ft 0 in (3.05 m)	34 reps	31
All values are from NFL Scouting Combine.

Watt skipped his senior season, entering the 2011 NFL draft. At the 2011 NFL Combine, he was a top performer in all combine categories except the 40-yard dash.

=== Houston Texans ===
==== 2011 ====
On April 28, 2011, he was the first defensive end selected in the first round when the Houston Texans picked him as the 11th overall pick. The Texans signed Watt to a four-year, $11.24 million contract on July 31, 2011.

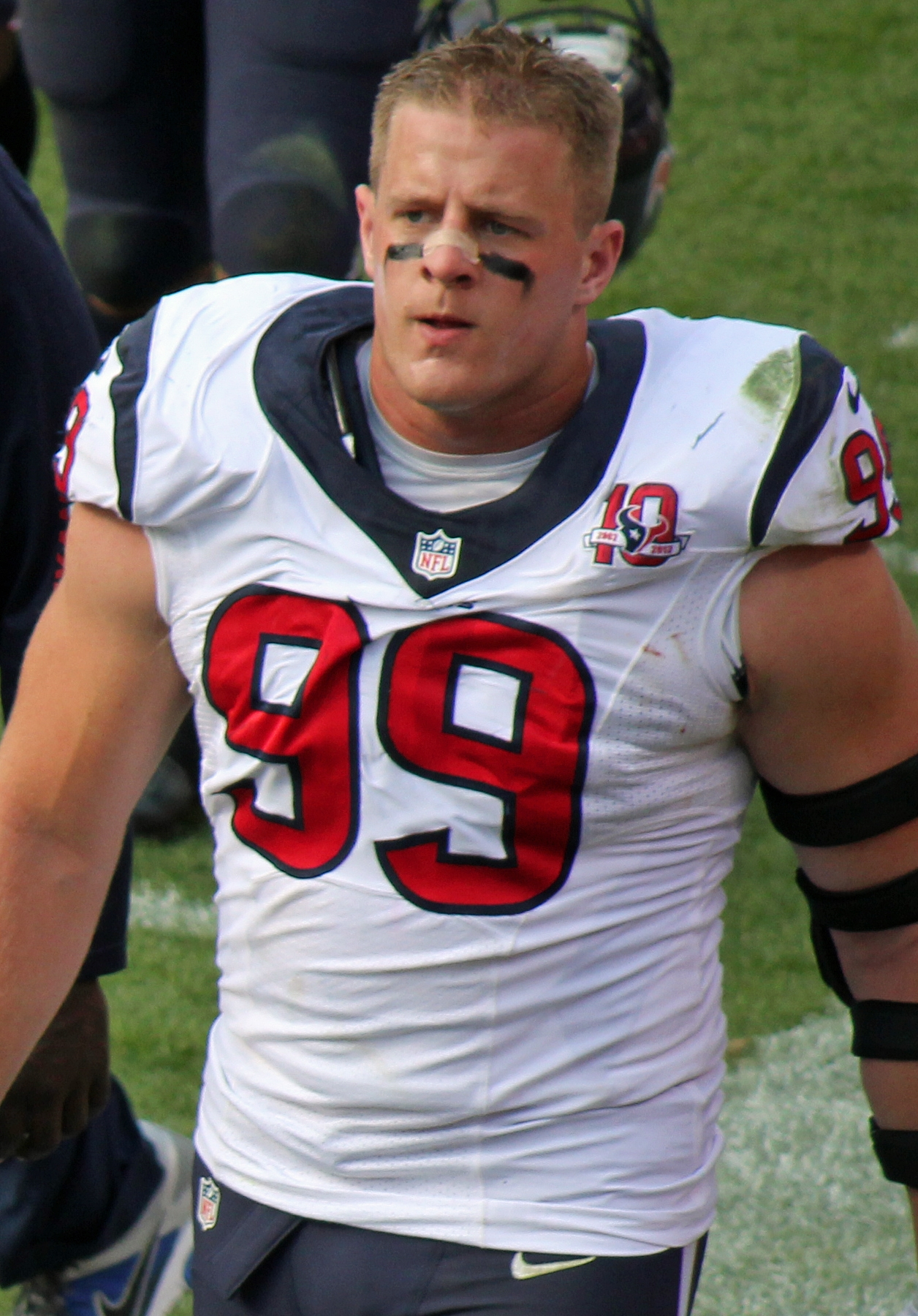
Watt during his sophomore season in 2012, when he won NFL Defensive Player of the Year

In the 2011 season, Watt started all 16 games. During the season opener against the Indianapolis Colts, he had five tackles and a fumble recovery in his NFL debut. On November 27, against the Jacksonville Jaguars, Watt had his first multi-sack game with 2.0 in the 20–13 victory. Watt finished his rookie year with 48 solo tackles, eight assisted tackles, and 5.5 sacks. The Texans qualified for the playoffs for the first time in franchise history.

In the playoffs, Watt recorded 11 solo tackles, three assisted tackles, an interception returned for a touchdown, one pass defended, and 3.5 sacks in two games against the Cincinnati Bengals in the Wild Card Round and the Baltimore Ravens in the Divisional Round. Watt was named to the PFWA All-Rookie Team and the USA Today All-Joe Team, and was named Texans Team Rookie of the Year.

==== 2012 ====
In 2012, Watt is considered to have had one of the best seasons for a defensive player in NFL history. He finished the season with 69 solo tackles, 12 assisted tackles, 20.5 sacks, 16 passes defended, four forced fumbles, and two fumble recoveries. He earned AFC Defensive Player of the Week for his Week 2 game against the Jacksonville Jaguars. He was named the AFC Defensive Player of the Month in both September and December. On November 22, 2012, in a game against the Detroit Lions, Watt recorded three sacks, to give him a total of 14.5, breaking the Texans' record for sacks in a season, which was previously held by Mario Williams. On December 16, against the Indianapolis Colts, Watt recorded three sacks and ten total tackles in a 29–17 victory. The Texans made the playoffs again in 2012, and Watt recorded six solo tackles, three assisted tackles, two passes defended, and two sacks in two games. Watt finished the season 2.5 sacks shy of Michael Strahan's single-season record for sacks, set in 2001. Watt was named to the 2013 NFL Pro-Bowl Team on December 26, 2012. Watt also was named Texans Team Most Valuable Player, USA Football Fundamentals Team, PFW First-team All-Pro, Pro Football Weekly/PFWA Most Valuable Player, Sporting News Defensive Player of the Year, NFL 101 AFC Defensive Player of the Year, AP First-team All-Pro, and the AP Defensive Player of the Year. Watt received 49 out of 50 votes for the Defensive Player of the Year award. He is the first Texans player to receive an NFL Player of the Year award. Watt was the 17th defensive lineman and only the eighth defensive end to receive the award since 1971. Watt made the highest debut on the NFL Top 100 Players of 2013, coming in at number five.

==== 2013 ====
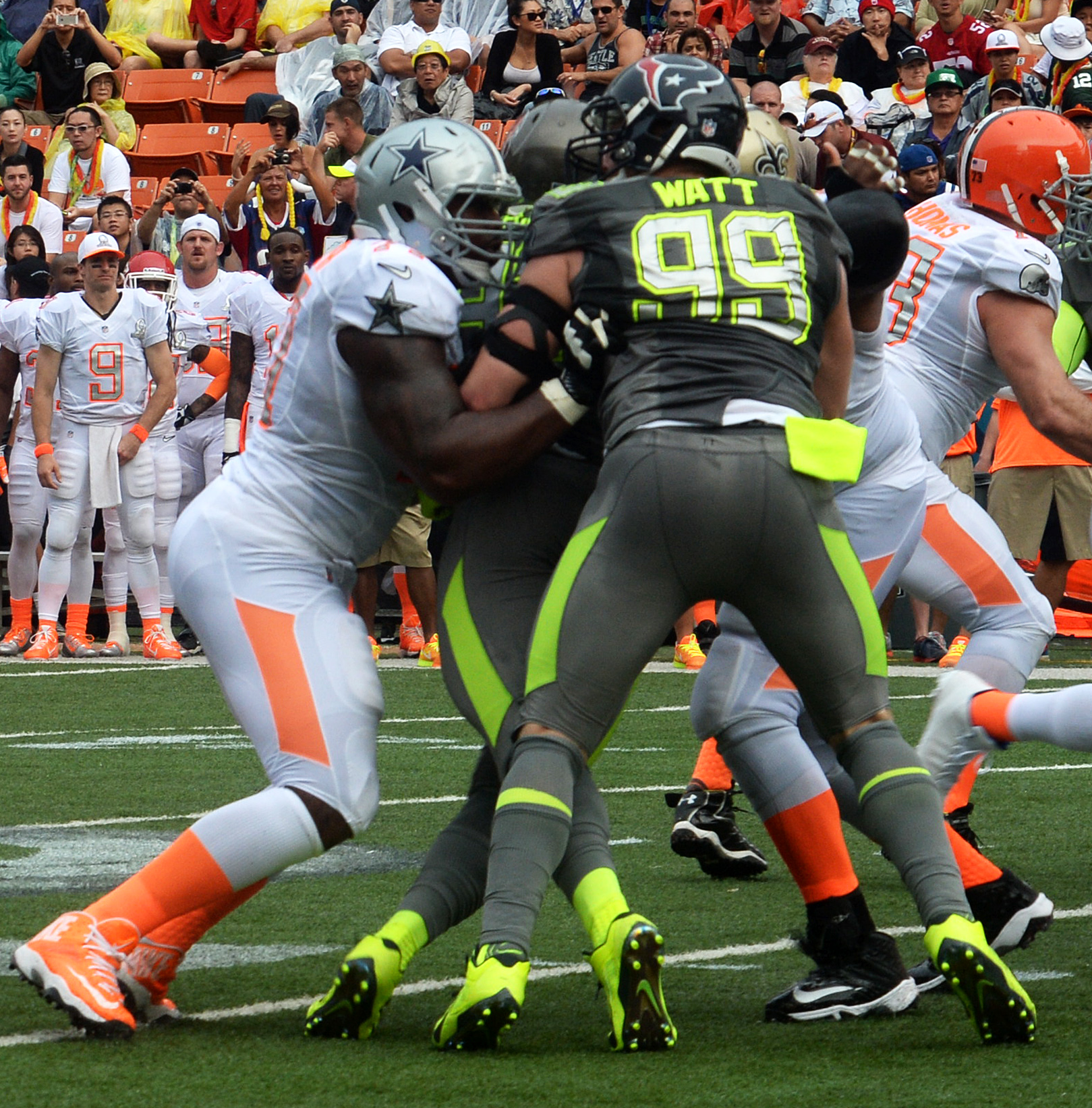
Watt during the 2014 Pro Bowl

Though Watt had a strong season, the Texans struggled as a whole in the 2013 season. In Week 2, against the Tennessee Titans, he had his first two sacks of the season in a 30–24 win. From Weeks 7–12, he recorded at least one sack in each game. Overall, in the 2013 season, Watt recorded 65 solo tackles, 15 assisted tackles, seven passes defended, 10.5 sacks, four forced fumbles, and two fumble recoveries. The Texans, however, had a losing season and finished with a 2–14 record. Watt was named to the 2014 NFL Pro Bowl and earned First Team All-Pro honors.

==== 2014 ====
Prior to the start of the 2014 season, the Texans and Watt agreed to a six-year contract extension, worth $100 million. He received $30.9 million at signing and was expected to receive $21 million at the start of the 2016 season if he was on the roster. This contract made him the NFL's highest paid non-quarterback, based on average yearly salary.

In a game against the Oakland Raiders, on September 14, Watt became the first defensive player in Texans history to score a touchdown from scrimmage. He scored the touchdown on a one-yard catch after coming into the game as a tight end. He scored his second touchdown of the season on September 28, against the Buffalo Bills. Watt picked off a pass from Buffalo's EJ Manuel that was intended for Fred Jackson, and returned it 80 yards for a touchdown. With this touchdown, Watt became tied at sixth for the longest interception return by a defensive lineman. Watt's touchdown was the fourth longest interception return in Houston Texans history. During the game, Watt hit Manuel nine times, but was flagged twice for roughing the passer. Watt was fined $16,537 for one of the incidents. In a game against the Bills, he earned AFC Defensive Player of the Week. Watt was named the AFC Defensive Player of the Month for September.

In a Week 5 Thursday night game against the Indianapolis Colts, Watt recorded two sacks on Andrew Luck, one of which was a strip-sack in the fourth quarter that he recovered and returned 45 yards for a touchdown. Despite Watt's performance, the Texans lost 33–28.

For his fourth touchdown of the season, Watt caught a two-yard pass from Texans quarterback, Ryan Mallett, for Mallett's first NFL touchdown pass. Watt recorded four solo tackles, an assisted tackle, a sack, a forced fumble, and a fumble recovery in the same game, which was on November 16, against the Cleveland Browns. He earned AFC Defensive Player of the Week for his game against the Browns.

Watt scored his fifth touchdown on November 30, 2014, catching a one-yard pass from Texans quarterback Ryan Fitzpatrick against the Tennessee Titans. With this reception, Watt became the first defensive lineman to have scored at least five touchdowns in a season since 1944.

In Week 16, Watt recorded his 54th sack as a Texan on Joe Flacco in a 25–13 win against the Baltimore Ravens. With that sack, he surpassed Mario Williams as the franchise leader in sacks. In Week 17, against the Jacksonville Jaguars, he had three sacks on Blake Bortles, one of which was his first career safety which also gave him 20.5 sacks on the season, becoming the only player in NFL history to have multiple 20-sack seasons. Watt earned AFC Defensive Player of the Month for December. Watt finished the season with a career-high five fumble recoveries and scored five total touchdowns (three receiving touchdowns, one interception return touchdown, and one fumble recovery for a touchdown).

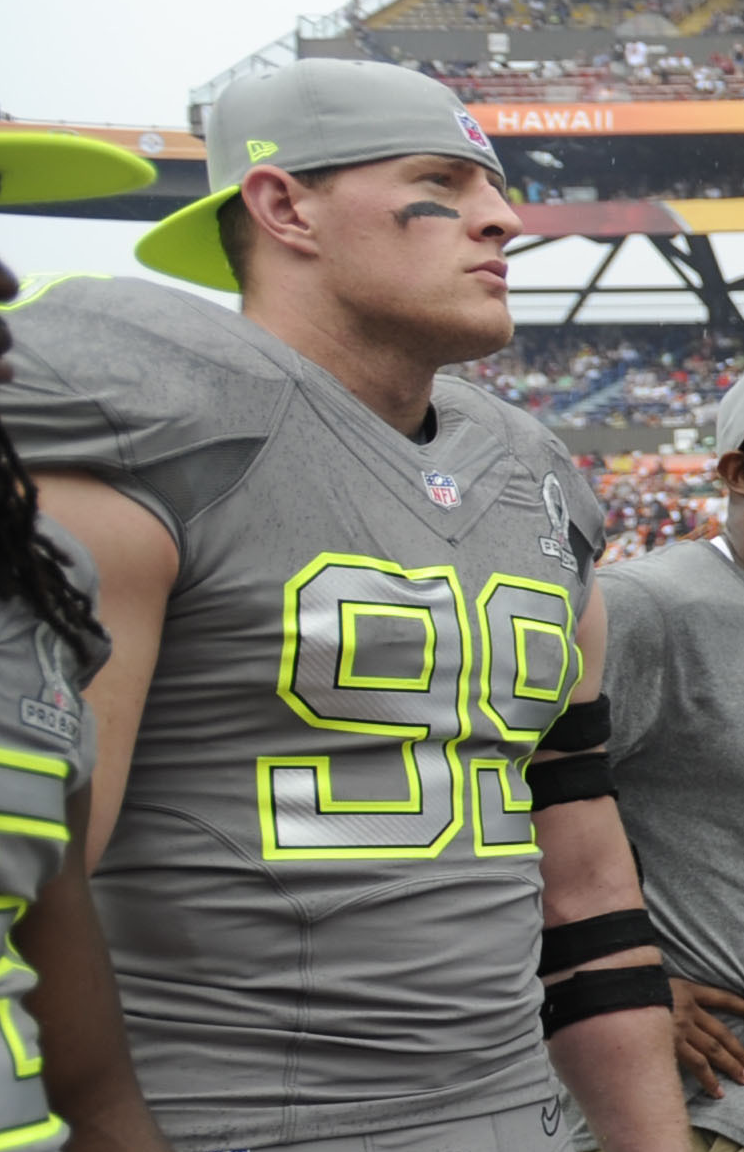
Watt during 2014 Pro Bowl coin toss

For his outstanding season, Watt was unanimously named to the 2014 All-Pro First Team as a defensive end and named to the All-Pro Second Team as a defensive tackle. Watt was named to the 2015 Pro Bowl, where Cris Carter, team captain of Team Carter, selected Watt to be his captain on defense. He unanimously won the Defensive Player of the Year award, one of a few players to win the award multiple times, and became the first defensive player since James Harrison in 2008 to get votes for the MVP award, receiving 13, which was also good enough for second place in the MVP voting behind Packers quarterback Aaron Rodgers, who won the award. After the season, Watt was named to the top spot in the NFL Top 100 Players of 2015.

==== 2015 ====
Despite battling a groin injury and a fractured left hand, Watt started all 16 games in 2015 making 76 tackles, an NFL-leading 17.5 sacks, eight passes defended, three forced fumbles, and a fumble recovery. In Week 11, against the New York Jets, he earned AFC Defensive Player of the Week. He earned AFC Defensive Player of the Month for November. In the regular season finale, against the Jacksonville Jaguars, Watt had a season-high three sacks to go along with eight total tackles. For his game against Jacksonville, he earned AFC Defensive Player of the Week. He was named to the 2015 Pro Bowl, which was his fourth consecutive appearance, and also received his third Defensive Player of the Year award, the only player aside from Lawrence Taylor and Aaron Donald to do so. With the Texans finishing the season 9–7, the team clinched an AFC South division title but were shut out 30–0 by the Kansas City Chiefs in the Wild Card Round. On January 12, 2016, Watt underwent groin surgery for a sports hernia. This forced Watt to withdraw from the 2016 Pro Bowl. He earned his fourth straight first-team All-Pro nomination. He was ranked as the top defensive lineman and the third-best player by his fellow players on the NFL Top 100 Players of 2016.

==== 2016 ====
On July 21, 2016, Watt underwent back surgery for a herniated disc. He began training camp on the PUP list, but returned in Week 1 to start the season in a victory over the Chicago Bears. In the next game, he had 1.5 sacks and five total tackles against the Kansas City Chiefs. The following week against the New England Patriots, Watt recorded two assisted tackles in his final action of the season. On September 28, he was placed on injured reserve. The following day, Watt underwent back surgery again, and was officially ruled out for the rest of the season after playing three games and recording 1.5 sacks. Even though he played in only three games, Watt was ranked 35th on the NFL Top 100 Players of 2017.

==== 2017 ====
Watt returned from his injury to play in the season opener against the Jacksonville Jaguars. During Week 5 against the Kansas City Chiefs on Sunday Night Football, Watt left the eventual 42–34 loss with an apparent leg injury. It was later revealed that he suffered a tibial plateau fracture in his left leg. He underwent surgery the next day and was ruled out the remainder of the season. In only five games, Watt finished with 11 tackles and two passes defended.

During the 2017 season, Watt raised upwards of $40 million for relief and recovery efforts for the Houston area after Hurricane Harvey. The entire sum was raised through an online drive after he donated $100,000 of his own money as the starting base. Watt commented that this season "was always about more than football." He was co-named Sports Illustrated Sportsperson of the Year along with Jose Altuve of the Houston Astros for 2017 for their humanitarian and leadership efforts. Watt was also named Walter Payton NFL Man of the Year. Despite his limited action, he was ranked 84th by his fellow players on the NFL Top 100 Players of 2018.

==== 2018 ====
Watt returned from his injury in time for the season opener against the New England Patriots. After being held without a sack in the first two weeks, he collected three sacks and eight combined tackles in the Week 3 27–22 defeat against the New York Giants, his first sacks since Week 2 of 2016. He followed that up with two sacks the following week in the OT win against the Indianapolis Colts. He was named the AFC Defensive Player of the Month for the month of September after recording five sacks, 20 tackles, and four forced fumbles. In Week 12, Watt recorded nine tackles, 1.5 sacks, and a forced fumble in a 34–17 win over the Tennessee Titans, earning him AFC Defensive Player of the Week. After only recording 1.5 sacks in his previous two injury-plagued seasons, Watt finished the season with 16 sacks, second in the league behind Aaron Donald, and was named a First-team All-Pro for the fifth time in his career. He was named to his fifth Pro Bowl for his 2018 season. Watt became the second player to record four seasons with at least 15 sacks since the sack became an official statistic in 1982 (Reggie White had five such seasons). He was ranked 12th by his fellow players on the NFL Top 100 Players of 2019.

==== 2019 ====
In the season-opener against the New Orleans Saints, Watt recorded no tackles and no quarterback hits in the narrow 30–28 loss. This was the first time in 105 career games that he was held to these numbers. Two weeks later against the Los Angeles Chargers, Watt sacked Philip Rivers twice in the 27–20 road victory. During Week 8 against the Oakland Raiders, Watt suffered a season-ending torn pectoral; the Texans went on to win 27–24. He was placed on injured reserve three days later.

Watt was designated for return from injured reserve on December 24 and began practicing with the team again. He was activated on December 31, 2019, prior to the Wild Card Round against the Buffalo Bills. During the game, Watt sacked Josh Allen once during the 22–19 overtime victory. This sack forced the Bills, who were up 13–0 at the time, to settle for a field goal rather than a touchdown, allowing the Texans to get back in the game and eventually win it in overtime. He was ranked 45th by his fellow players on the NFL Top 100 Players of 2020. Watt was also named to the Pro Football Hall of Fame All-Decade Team for the 2010s.

==== 2020 ====
In Week 2 against the Baltimore Ravens, Watt recorded his first two sacks of the season on Lamar Jackson during the 16–33 loss. In Week 6 against the Tennessee Titans, Watt recorded his 99th career sack on Ryan Tannehill, a strip sack that was recovered by the Texans, during the 42–36 overtime loss. In Week 9 against the Jacksonville Jaguars, Watt recorded his 100th career sack on rookie quarterback Jake Luton during the 27–25 win. He became the fifth-fastest player to reach the milestone. In Week 12, on Thanksgiving against the Detroit Lions, Watt intercepted a pass thrown by Matthew Stafford and returned it for a 19-yard touchdown during the 41–25 win. It was Watt's third career pick-six and his first touchdown since 2014. In Week 13 against the Indianapolis Colts, Watt recorded a sack on Philip Rivers during the 26–20 loss. It would ultimately turn out to be Watt's final sack in a Texans uniform.

On February 12, 2021, Watt requested and was granted his release from the Texans. He was ranked 66th by his fellow players on the NFL Top 100 Players of 2021.

==== Houston Texans Ring of Honor ====
On June 12, 2023, the Texans announced that Watt would be inducted into the Houston Texans Ring of Honor on October 1.

=== Arizona Cardinals ===
==== 2021 ====
On March 1, 2021, Watt signed a two-year, $28 million contract with the Arizona Cardinals, with $23 million guaranteed. Although #99 was retired by the Cardinals in honor of Marshall Goldberg, Goldberg's daughter, Ellen, gave Watt permission to wear it. In Week 7 against his former team, Watt suffered a shoulder injury in the second quarter, but remained in the game. On October 27, it was revealed Watt would need season-ending shoulder surgery. He was placed on injured reserve on November 6, 2021. He was activated on January 17, 2022, for the Cardinals' Wild Card Round loss to the Los Angeles Rams.

==== 2022 ====
Despite experiencing atrial fibrillation on September 28, 2022, and having his heart shocked back in rhythm in a planned procedure the next day, Watt committed to play in Week 4. Watt announced on December 27 that he would retire at the end of the season. In his final game against the San Francisco 49ers, Watt recorded two sacks in the 38–13 road loss.

Watt finished his final season with 39 tackles, 18 tackles for loss, 12.5 sacks, and a forced fumble in 16 games and starts.

== Career statistics ==
Legend
	NFL Defensive Player of the Year
	Led the league
	NFL record
**Bold**	Career high

=== NFL ===
==== Regular season ====
Year	Team	Games		Tackles					Fumbles				Interceptions						Other		Receiving					
Year	Team	GP	GS	Cmb	Solo	Ast	Sck	TFL	FF	FR	Yds	TD	Int	Yds	Avg	Lng	TD	PD	Sfty	Blk	Tgts	Rec	Yds	Avg	Lng	TD
2011	HOU	16	16	56	49	7	5.5	13	0	2	2	0	—	—	—	—	—	4	—	1	—	—	—	—	—	—
2012	HOU	16	16	**81**	**69**	12	**20.5**	**39**	4	2	7	0	—	—	—	—	—	**16**	—	—	—	—	—	—	—	—
2013	HOU	16	16	80	65	15	10.5	22	4	2	0	0	—	—	—	—	—	7	—	**2**	—	—	—	—	—	—
2014	HOU	16	16	78	59	**19**	**20.5**	29	4	**5**	**59**	**1**	**1**	**80**	**80.0**	**80**	**1**	10	**1**	1	**3**	**3**	**4**	**1.3**	**2**	**3**
2015	HOU	16	16	76	57	**19**	17.5	29	3	1	0	0	—	—	—	—	—	8	—	—	1	0	0	0.0	0	0
2016	HOU	3	3	8	1	7	1.5	1	0	1	0	0	—	—	—	—	—	0	—	—	—	—	—	—	—	—
2017	HOU	5	5	15	11	4	0.0	3	0	0	0	0	—	—	—	—	—	2	—	—	—	—	—	—	—	—
2018	HOU	16	16	61	47	14	16.0	18	**7**	0	0	0	—	—	—	—	—	4	—	—	—	—	—	—	—	—
2019	HOU	8	8	24	15	9	4.0	4	1	2	0	0	—	—	—	—	—	3	—	—	—	—	—	—	—	—
2020	HOU	16	16	52	36	16	5.0	14	2	1	0	0	**1**	19	19.0	19	**1**	7	—	—	—	—	—	—	—	—
2021	ARI	7	7	16	10	6	1.0	5	1	0	0	0	—	—	—	—	—	2	—	—	—	—	—	—	—	—
2022	ARI	16	16	39	30	9	12.5	18	1	1	0	0	—	—	—	—	—	7	—	—	—	—	—	—	—	—
Career		151	151	586	449	137	114.5	195	27	17	68	1	2	99	49.5	80	2	70	1	4	4	3	4	1.3	2	3

==== Postseason ====
Year	Team	Games		Tackles					Fumbles				Interceptions					
Year	Team	GP	GS	Cmb	Solo	Ast	Sck	TFL	FF	FR	Yds	TD	Int	Yds	Avg	Lng	TD	PD
2011	HOU	2	2	**14**	**11**	**3**	**3.5**	**4**	—	—	—	—	**1**	**29**	**29.0**	**29**	**1**	1
2012	HOU	2	2	9	6	**3**	1.5	3	—	—	—	—	—	—	—	—	—	**2**
2015	HOU	1	1	1	0	1	0.0	0	—	—	—	—	—	—	—	—	—	0
2016	HOU	0	0	Did not play due to injury														
2018	HOU	1	1	2	2	0	0.0	1	—	—	—	—	—	—	—	—	—	**2**
2019	HOU	2	0	2	1	1	1.0	1	—	—	—	—	—	—	—	—	—	1
2021	ARI	1	0	3	1	2	0.0	1	—	—	—	—	—	—	—	—	—	0
Career		9	6	31	21	10	6.0	10	0	0	0	0	1	29	29.0	29	1	6

=== College ===
Season	Team	Class	Pos	GP	Receiving				Rushing				Scrimmage			
Season	Team	Class	Pos	GP	Rec	Yds	Avg	TD	Att	Yds	Avg	TD	Plays	Yds	Avg	TD
2007	Central Michigan	FR	TE	14	8	77	9.6	0	0	0	0.0	0	8	77	9.6	0

Season	Team	Class	Pos	GP	Tackles					Interceptions					Fumbles			
Season	Team	Class	Pos	GP	Solo	Ast	Cmb	TfL	Sck	Int	Yds	Avg	TD	PD	FR	Yds	TD	FF
2009	Wisconsin	(redshirt) SO	DE	13	32	12	44	15.5	4.5	0	0	0.0	0	5	0	0	0	0
2010	Wisconsin	(redshirt) JR	DE	13	**42**	**20**	**62**	**21.0**	**7.0**	**1**	**15**	**15.0**	0	**9**	0	0	0	0
Career				26	74	32	106	36.5	11.5	1	15	15.0	0	14	0	0	0	0

== Career highlights ==
=== Awards and honors ===
NFL

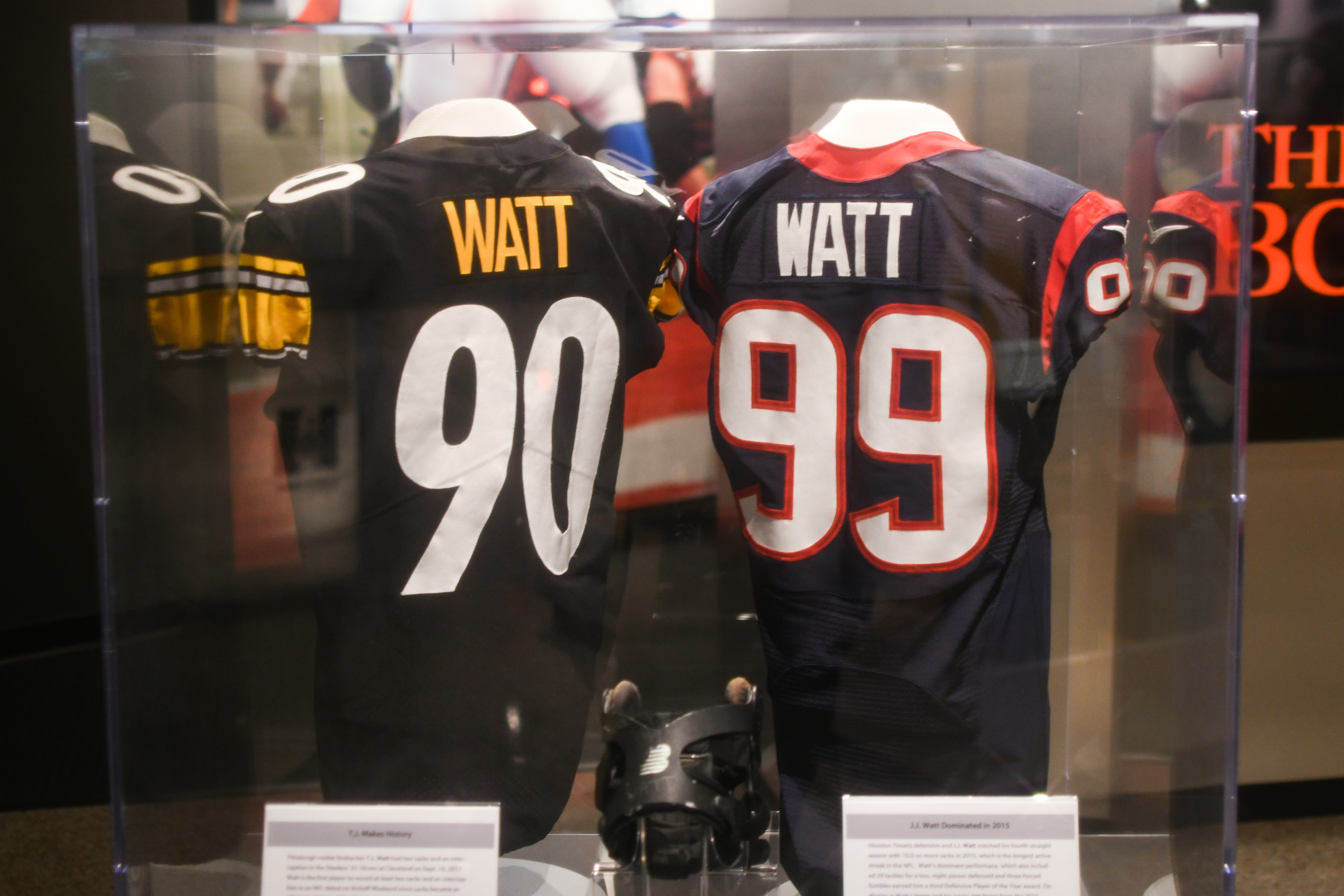
Watt's uniform worn with the Houston Texans (right) and his brother's (T. J. Watt) Pittsburgh Steelers uniform (left), both exhibited at the Pro Football Hall of Fame

- 5× Pro Bowl (2012, 2013, 2014, 2015, 2018)
- Pro Bowl Defensive MVP (2014)
- 5× First-team All-Pro (2012, 2013, 2014, 2015, 2018)
- 3× Associated Press NFL Defensive Player of the Year (2012, 2014, 2015)
- 3× Pro Football Writers Association NFL Defensive Player of the Year (2012, 2014, 2015)
- 3× Sporting News Defensive Player of the Year (2012, 2014, 2015)
- 3× Pro Football Focus Defensive Player of the Year (2012, 2013, 2014)
- 3× Pro Football Focus Best Player of the Year (2012, 2013, 2014)
- 4× 101 Awards - AFC Defensive Player of the Year (2012, 2014, 2015, 2018)
- 2× NFL sacks leader (2012, 2015)
- AP NFL MVP runner-up (2014)
- Bert Bell Award (2014)
- Walter Payton NFL Man of the Year (2017)
- 100 sacks club
- Ranked No. 5 in the Top 100 Players of 2013
- Ranked No. 12 in the Top 100 Players of 2014
- Ranked No. 1 in the Top 100 Players of 2015
- Ranked No. 3 in the Top 100 Players of 2016
- Ranked No. 35 in the Top 100 Players of 2017
- Ranked No. 84 in the Top 100 Players of 2018
- Ranked No. 12 in the Top 100 Players of 2019
- Ranked No. 45 in the Top 100 Players of 2020
- Only player with multiple 20-sack seasons (2012, 2014)
- 5× PFWA All-NFL Team (2012–2015, 2018)
- 6× AFC Defensive Player of the Month (Sep. 2012, Dec. 2012, Sep. 2014, Dec. 2014, Nov. 2015, Sep. 2018)

College

- Lott Trophy (2010)
- Big Ten champion (2010)
- First-team All-American, PFW (2010)
- First-team All-Big Ten (2010)
- 3× Big Ten Defensive Player of the Week (2009–2010)
- Wisconsin Team Co-MVP (2010)

=== Houston Texans franchise records ===
- Career sacks (101.0)
- Career forced (25) and recovered fumbles (16)

== Personal life ==
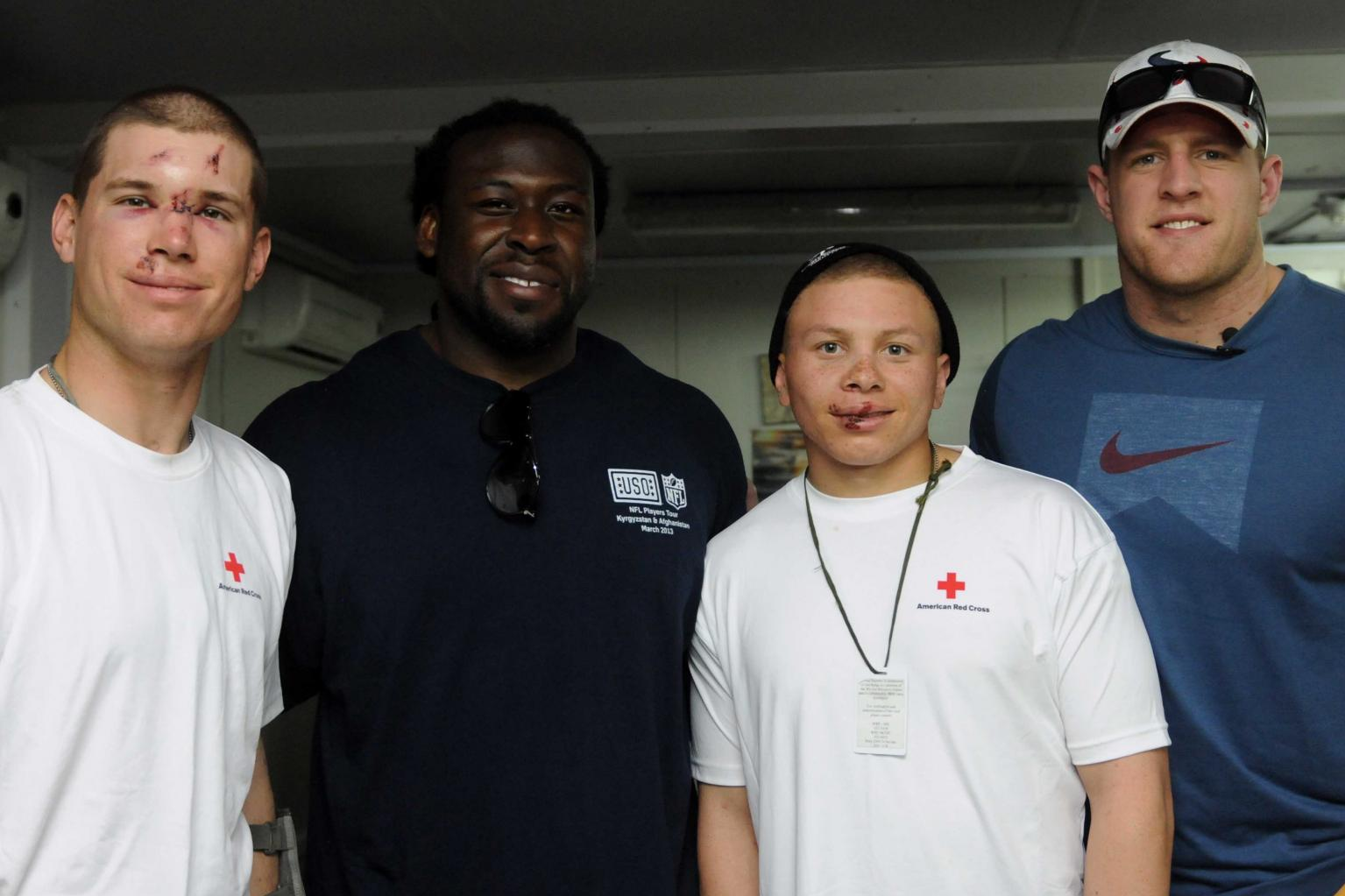
Watt (right) with Davin Joseph (second from left) and two U.S. soldiers recovering at Regional Command South in March 2013

While an undergraduate at the University of Wisconsin-Madison, Watt delivered pizzas for a Pewaukee Pizza Hut.

On July 22, 2015, Watt was named the vice president of Power Relations for Reliant. Reliant is a retail electric provider in Texas, also a subsidiary of NRG Energy Inc.

On February 15, 2018, Baylor College of Medicine announced that Watt would receive an honorary degree from their medical school. On May 29, 2018, he received the degree of Doctor of Humanities in Medicine.

Watt is the older brother of former fullback Derek Watt and Pittsburgh Steelers linebacker T. J. Watt, both of whom were teammates in Pittsburgh from 2020 to 2022.

In 2016, Watt began a relationship with professional soccer player Kealia Ohai. In 2019, they got engaged, and they were married on February 15, 2020, in the Bahamas. In October 2022, the couple had a son. Their second son was born in June 2025.

Watt was named the Grand Marshal of the 2019 Daytona 500. On February 1, 2020, Watt hosted Saturday Night Live.

In 2020, Watt and his brothers began hosting the Fox game show Ultimate Tag.

Watt is a fan of Chelsea F.C., but on May 1, 2023, Watt and his wife were announced as new minority investors in Burnley F.C., which earned promotion from the EFL Championship to the Premier League for the 2023–24 season. He participated as a guest player for Burnley in The Soccer Tournament in 2024. He has also designed the 2026/27 season away jersey.

=== Ice hockey ===
Watt is an avid ice hockey fan. He played hockey from age four until he was 13 years old, traveling as far as Canada and Germany for tournaments. Watt said that he played "primarily as a center and was a goal scorer." Because of the financial cost of the sport and making a choice between hockey and football, Watt stopped playing hockey to focus on football. Without a hometown National Hockey League team in his state, Watt grew up cheering for both the Chicago Blackhawks and Detroit Red Wings, while his favorite active player was Zdeno Chara for his large stature (like Watt's) and physical style of play. His favorite ever athlete is hockey great Gordie Howe. Since retiring from the NFL, Watt frequently comments on NHL affairs and has played in a recreational hockey league.

=== Health ===
On October 2, 2022, Watt tweeted that he had gone into atrial fibrillation on September 28, 2022, and had to have his heart shocked back in rhythm the next day. Watt further stated that he was revealing the information himself because it was about to be leaked.

== Philanthropy ==
Watt is the president and founder of the Justin J. Watt Foundation, a charity organization that provides after-school opportunities for children in various communities, for them to get involved in athletics in a safe environment. The foundation's motto, "Dream Big, Work Hard", is sold on wristbands and T-shirts. Since this foundation was launched in 2010, Watt has raised over $1 million. While most of the schools that benefit from the fundraising are in Texas and Wisconsin, schools in Alabama, Illinois, and California have also received donations. Watt's mother Connie is the vice president of the organization. Watt and the J. J. Watt Foundation host a Charity Classic, Run/Walk, Golf Outing, and Tailgate annually. The Charity Classic is a softball game held at Constellation Field, in Sugar Land, Texas, in which Texans players participate in a game, and Home Run Derby to raise money for the foundation. The inaugural Charity Classic game was in 2013, and the 2014 Charity Classic raised over $436,433 towards his foundation. On August 26, 2014, Watt received the Texans Spirit of the Bull Community Award. On November 14, 2014, Watt was nominated for the NFL's Salute to Service Award that honors either a coach, player, or owner for their efforts in supporting the country's servicemen and women. Due to the extremely good turnout in 2014, the annual Charity Classic has been moved to Minute Maid Park, home of the Houston Astros. The 2015 event raised over $640,000. For the 2017 game, Watt invited Arnold Schwarzenegger and swimmer Simone Manuel, a two-time Olympic gold medalist and native of Houston.

Watt is also known for his interactions with children. On July 2, 2011, the Berry family was traveling home from a vacation in Colorado Springs. The parents, Joshua and Robin Berry, were killed in a head-on collision, and their two sons, Peter and Aaron, were left handicapped. Their daughter, Willa, suffered minor injuries. Watt met the children at a fundraiser and grew close to them. He played wheelchair basketball with them and mimed rolling a wheelchair after sacking a quarterback in a 2012 game. The mime was an agreed-upon signal between the Berry children and Watt as a post-sack celebration.

Following the Sandy Hook Elementary School shooting in 2012, Watt found out that some of the affected families were in the Houston area. He invited them out on the field to hang out and throw the football. Watt then proceeded to give them signed merchandise that he had worn in previous games. In October 2015, Watt dressed up as Batman to surprise kids at the Texas Children's Hospital for a Halloween party.

Watt raised over $37 million ($100,000 of which he personally donated) to help Houston recover from Hurricane Harvey, surpassing his initial goal of $200,000.

After the 2018 Santa Fe High School shooting that left eight students and two teachers dead, Watt offered to pay for the funerals of the deceased. He also covered the funeral costs for the victims of the Waukesha Christmas parade attack in 2021, which left six people dead.

== Broadcasting career ==
On July 30, 2025, CBS announced that Watt would be on the network's No. 2 team to cover NFL games, alongside Ian Eagle and Evan Washburn. On July 31, 2026, he was tapped as a replacement for Tony Romo on the lead coverage team, after Romo was put on leave the same day following his arrest for operating while under the influence (OWI) on July 23, 2026. On October 2, 2026, he was tapped to do so for the rest of the season after Romo parted ways with CBS Sports. On October 22, 2026, he signed a multi-year deal with CBS Sports to continue doing so beyond this season.

== Filmography ==
Film and television appearances
Year	Title	Role	Notes
2014	The League	Himself	Multiple appearances
2015	New Girl	Himself	Episode: "The Right Thing"
2016	Bad Moms	Coach Craig	Debut movie appearance
2016	CMT Music Awards	Himself/co-host	Alongside Erin Andrews
2020	Saturday Night Live	Himself/host	"J.J. Watt and Luke Combs" February 1
2020	Ultimate Tag	Himself/host	With Derek and T.J. Watt
2024	Tires	Himself	Cameo appearance

== Notes ==
Sporting positions
Preceded by Tony Romo	NFL on CBS lead analyst 2026–present	Succeeded by Incumbent
