= Derek Watt =

American football player (born 1992)

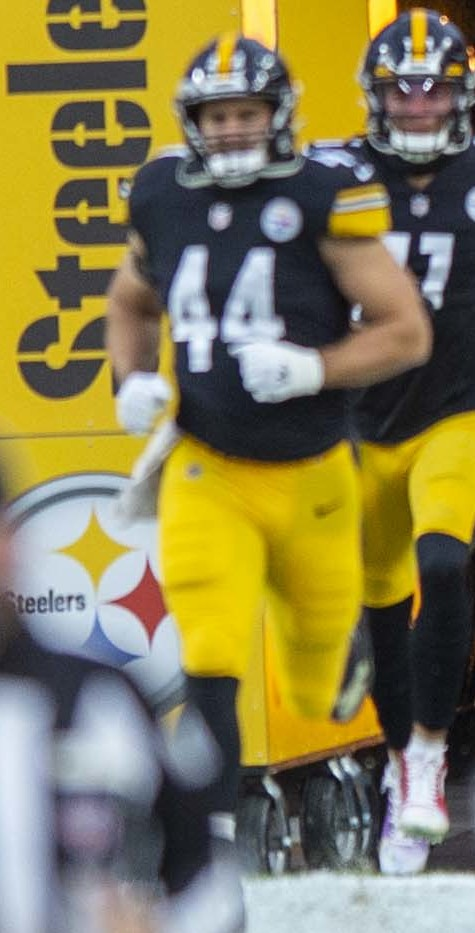
- Watt with the Pittsburgh Steelers in 2020

No. 34, 44
- Position: Fullback

Personal information
- Born: November 7, 1992 (age 34); Waukesha, Wisconsin, U.S.
- Listed height: 6 ft 2 in (1.88 m)
- Listed weight: 234 lb (106 kg)

Career information
- High school: Pewaukee (Pewaukee, Wisconsin)
- College: Wisconsin (2011–2015)
- NFL draft: 2016: 6th round, 198th overall pick

Career history
- San Diego / Los Angeles Chargers (2016–2019); Pittsburgh Steelers (2020–2022)

Career NFL statistics
- Rushing yards: 71
- Rushing average: 2.4
- Rushing touchdowns: 2
- Receptions: 18
- Receiving yards: 178
- Receiving touchdowns: 1
- Stats at Pro Football Reference

Derek John Watt (born November 7, 1992) is an American former professional football player who was a fullback in the National Football League (NFL). He played college football for the Wisconsin Badgers and was selected by the San Diego Chargers in the sixth round of the 2016 NFL draft. Watt, who is the younger brother of J. J. and older brother of T. J., also played for the Pittsburgh Steelers.

== Early life ==
Watt was born the middle son of three boys to Connie, a building operations vice president, and John Watt, a firefighter. He has an older brother Justin ("J. J."), and younger brother Trent ("T. J.") who were born and raised in Pewaukee, Wisconsin.

He attended and played high school football at Pewaukee High School.

Watt attended University of Wisconsin-Madison, where he was teammates with his brother T. J. from 2012 to 2015.

== College career ==
Watt played at the University of Wisconsin from 2011 to 2015. He was part of the offense that helped running back Melvin Gordon amass record-breaking rushing yards during his Badger career.

In the 2012 season, Watt had 12 receptions for 150 receiving yards. In the 2013 season, he had three receptions for 20 receiving yards. In the 2014 season, he only appeared in three games on the season. In his final collegiate season in 2015, he had 15 receptions for 139 receiving yards. Gordon and Watt went on to reunite as teammates when Watt was drafted by the Chargers in 2016.

Watt won the 2019 Lowman Trophy along with his teammates, John Chenal and Mason Stokke. The Lowman Trophy is an award for the best college fullback in the nation, presented by the Barstool Sports podcast, Pardon My Take, hosted by Dan Katz and PFT Commenter.

== Professional career ==
=== Pre-draft ===
Pro Football Focus rated Watt the second-best fullback in the 2016 draft overall, and he also received the second-best blocking grade among fullbacks in the draft.

Pre-draft measurables
Height	Weight	Arm length	Hand span	Wingspan	40-yard dash	10-yard split	20-yard split	20-yard shuttle	Vertical jump	Broad jump	Bench press
6 ft 2 in (1.88 m)	235 lb (107 kg)	31 in (0.79 m)	10 1/8 in (0.26 m)	6 ft 4 in (1.93 m)	4.77 s	1.63 s	2.73 s	4.32 s	33.5 in (0.85 m)	9 ft 8 in (2.95 m)	19 reps
All values from Pro Day

=== San Diego / Los Angeles Chargers ===
Watt was drafted by the San Diego Chargers in the sixth round (198th overall) in the 2016 NFL draft. In the 2019 season, Watt appeared in all 16 games and recorded a rushing touchdown against the Jacksonville Jaguars. He played for the Chargers from 2016 to 2019. He contributed as a fullback, and in a special teams role.

=== Pittsburgh Steelers ===
On March 26, 2020, Watt signed a three-year, $9.75 million deal with the Pittsburgh Steelers. Signing with the Steelers made Watt a teammate of his younger brother T. J., an outside linebacker. In Week 2, against the Denver Broncos, Watt blocked a punt that resulted in a safety. On December 21, 2020, he was knocked out as a gunner as he was concussed after being blocked into former Badgers teammate Alex Erickson on a punt return. After spending the whole season mainly on a special teams role with zero yards on offense, Watt ran his first rushing plays with the Steelers in the Wild Card Round against the Cleveland Browns.

In the 2021 season, Watt appeared in all 17 games and started four.

During Week 8 of the 2022 season at the Philadelphia Eagles, Watt caught a one-yard touchdown on a throw from wide receiver Chase Claypool. In the 2022 season, Watt appeared in all 17 games and started three. He continued to contribute as a fullback and on special teams.

After not being signed to a team for the 2023 season, he announced his retirement from football via Instagram on March 12, 2024.

== Personal life ==
Watt married Gabriella Justin in 2018. The couple's first child, Logan James Watt, was born in February 2019, Their second son, Brayden George Watt, was born in December 2020. On April 25, 2025, the couple’s first daughter, Isabella Grace Watt, was born.

In 2020, Watt appeared in a Subway commercial with his brothers J. J. and T. J. along with their parents John and Connie. Derek, J. J. and T. J. were also the hosts for the TV show Ultimate Tag.
