= 2014 Houston Texans season =

American football team season record

- Owner: Bob McNair
- General manager: Rick Smith
- Head coach: Bill O'Brien
- Defensive coordinator: Romeo Crennel
- Home stadium: NRG Stadium

Results
- Record: 9–7
- Division place: 2nd AFC South
- Playoffs: Did not qualify
- Pro Bowlers: 3: RB Arian Foster; DE J. J. Watt; LT Duane Brown

Uniform
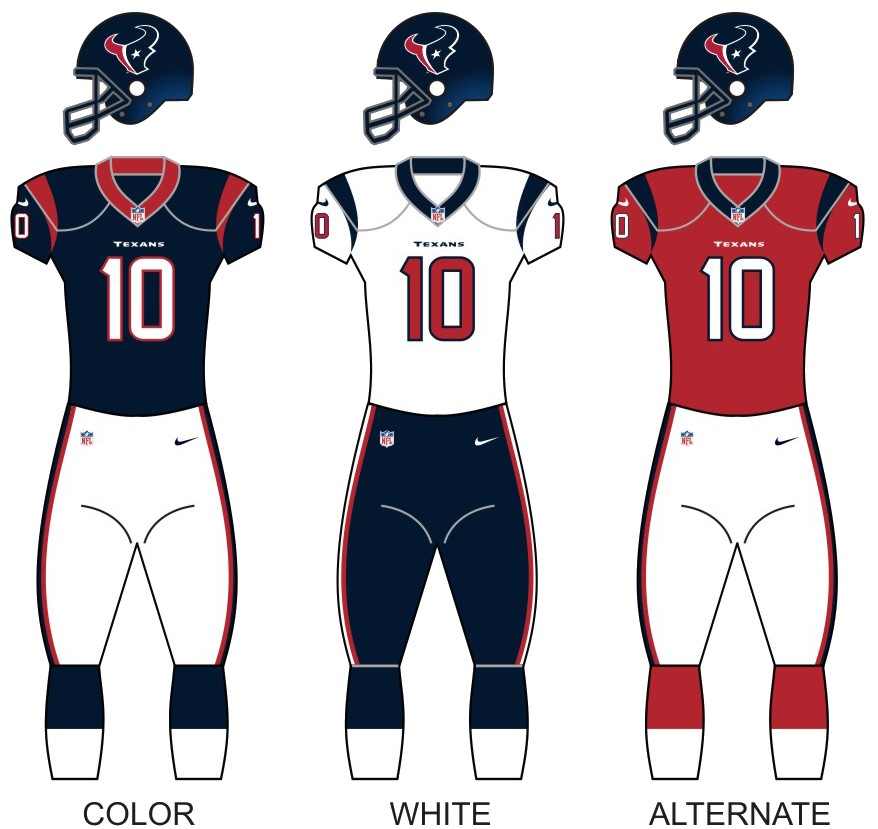

The 2014 season was the Houston Texans' 13th in the National Football League (NFL) and their first under head coach Bill O'Brien. Despite missing the playoffs for the second season in a row, the Texans greatly improved upon their 2–14 record from 2013, finishing 9–7. This represents the greatest single-season turnaround for the Texans, but the 2023 team came the closest to tying it, winning the AFC South and making the playoffs at 10-7, improving on their 3-13-1 record from 2022. However, because the 2014 Texans won 7 more games than the 2013 team, while the 2023 Texans won 6.5 more games than the 2022 team, the 2014 Texans had a greater single-season turnaround than the 2023 team.

== Offseason ==
=== Draft ===
2014 Houston Texans draft
| Round | Pick | Player | Position | College | Notes |
| 1 | 1 | Jadeveon Clowney * | DE | South Carolina | |
| 2 | 33 | Xavier Su'a-Filo | OG | UCLA | |
| 3 | 65 | C.J. Fiedorowicz | TE | Iowa | |
| 3 | 83 | Louis Nix | DT | Notre Dame | Pick from PHI |
| 4 | 135 | Tom Savage | QB | Pittsburgh | Compensatory |
| 6 | 177 | Jeoffrey Pagan | DE | Alabama | |
| 6 | 181 | Alfred Blue | RB | LSU | Pick from OAK |
| 6 | 211 | Jay Prosch | FB | Auburn | Compensatory |
| 7 | 216 | Andre Hal | CB | Vanderbilt | |
| 7 | 256 | Lonnie Ballentine | S | Memphis | Compensatory |
Made roster † Pro Football Hall of Fame * Made at least one Pro Bowl during career

Draft trades

- The Texans traded their original fourth- (No. 101 overall) and fifth- (No. 141 overall) round selections to the Philadelphia Eagles in exchange for the Eagles' third-round selection (No. 83 overall).
- The Texans acquired this sixth-round selection (No. 181 overall) in a trade that sent quarterback Matt Schaub to the Oakland Raiders.

== Staff ==
2014 Houston Texans staff
| Front office: Founder/owner/chairman/CEO – Bob McNair; Vice chairman – D. Cal McNair; President – Jamey Rootes; Executive vice president/general manager – Rick Smith; Vice president of football administration – Chris Olsen; Senior personnel advisor – Bobby Grier; Director of college scouting – Mike Maccagnan; Director of football research – Jim Bernhardt; Director of pro personnel – Brian Gaine; Assistant director of pro personnel – Larry Wright; Head coaches: Head coach – Bill O'Brien; Offensive coaches: Quarterbacks – George Godsey; Running backs – Charles London; Wide receivers – Stan Hixon; Tight ends – John Perry; Offensive line – Paul Dunn; Offensive quality control – Tim Kelly | Defensive coaches: Defensive coordinator – Romeo Crennel; Defensive line – Bill Kollar; Linebackers – Mike Vrabel; Secondary – John Butler; Assistant secondary – Anthony Midget; Defensive quality control – Will Lawing; Special teams coaches: Special teams coordinator – Bob Ligashesky; Assistant special teams - Doug Colman; Strength and conditioning: Head strength and conditioning – Craig Fitzgerald; Assistant strength and conditioning – Sean Hayes; Assistant strength and conditioning – Anthony Pleasant |

== Final roster ==
2014 Houston Texans roster
| Quarterbacks (QB): 7 Case Keenum; 6 Thad Lewis; 3 Tom Savage; Running backs (RB): 28 Alfred Blue; 23 Arian Foster; 41 Jonathan Grimes; 45 Jay Prosch FB; Wide receivers (WR): 10 DeAndre Hopkins; 80 Andre Johnson; 13 Damaris Johnson; 82 Keshawn Martin; 11 DeVier Posey; Tight ends (TE): 81 Anthony Denham; 87 C. J. Fiedorowicz; 88 Garrett Graham; 84 Ryan Griffin | Offensive linemen (OL): 70 Jeff Adams T; 79 Brandon Brooks G; 76 Duane Brown T; 74 Tyson Clabo T; 60 Ben Jones G; 55 Chris Myers C; 75 Derek Newton T; 71 Xavier Suʻa-Filo G; Defensive linemen (DL): 98 Keith Browner Jr. DE; 93 Jared Crick DE; 97 Jeoffrey Pagan DE; 94 Ryan Pickett NT; 95 Jerrell Powe NT; 99 J. J. Watt DE | Linebackers (LB): 91 Jason Ankrah OLB; 56 Brian Cushing ILB; 50 Akeem Dent ILB; 59 Whitney Mercilus OLB; 54 Mike Mohamed ILB; 58 Brooks Reed OLB; 51 John Simon OLB; 52 Jeff Tarpinian ILB; 57 Justin Tuggle ILB; Defensive backs (DB): 37 Josh Aubrey SS; 34 A. J. Bouye CB; 29 Andre Hal FS; 25 Kareem Jackson CB; 24 Johnathan Joseph CB; 21 Kendrick Lewis FS; 38 Danieal Manning SS; 26 Darryl Morris CB; 35 Eddie Pleasant SS; 20 Jumal Rolle CB; 36 D. J. Swearinger SS; Special teams (ST): 4 Randy Bullock K; 9 Shane Lechler P; 46 Jon Weeks LS | Practice squad: 64 Kourtnei Brown LB; 2 Jace Davis WR; 74 Matt Feiler T; 78 James Ferentz C; 31 Charles James CB; 62 Alex Kupper G; 19 Travis Labhart WR (IR); 22 Ben Malena RB; 17 Uzoma Nwachukwu WR; 27 Terrance Parks S; 12 Ricky Stanzi QB; Reserve: 39 Lonnie Ballentine FS (IR); 16 Alan Bonner WR (IR); 53 Max Bullough ILB (IR); 90 Jadeveon Clowney OLB (IR); 14 Ryan Fitzpatrick QB (IR); 96 Tim Jamison DE (IR); 15 Ryan Mallett QB (IR); 92 Louis Nix NT (IR); 77 David Quessenberry G (NF-Ill.); 67 Cody White G (IR); 72 Bryan Witzmann T (IR); 73 Will Yeatman T (IR); Rookies in italics 53 active, 13 reserve, 10 practice squad |

== Schedule ==
=== Preseason ===
| Week | Date | Opponent | Result | Record | Venue | Recap |
|---|---|---|---|---|---|---|
| 1 | August 9 | at Arizona Cardinals | **L** 0–32 | 0–1 | University of Phoenix Stadium | Recap |
| 2 | August 16 | Atlanta Falcons | **W** 32–7 | 1–1 | NRG Stadium | Recap |
| 3 | August 23 | at Denver Broncos | **W** 18–17 | 2–1 | Sports Authority Field at Mile High | Recap |
| 4 | August 28 | San Francisco 49ers | **L** 13–40 | 2–2 | NRG Stadium | Recap |

=== Regular season ===
| Week | Date | Opponent | Result | Record | Venue | Recap |
|---|---|---|---|---|---|---|
| 1 | September 7 | Washington Redskins | **W** 17–6 | 1–0 | NRG Stadium | Recap |
| 2 | September 14 | at Oakland Raiders | **W** 30–14 | 2–0 | O.co Coliseum | Recap |
| 3 | September 21 | at New York Giants | **L** 17–30 | 2–1 | MetLife Stadium | Recap |
| 4 | September 28 | Buffalo Bills | **W** 23–17 | 3–1 | NRG Stadium | Recap |
| 5 | October 5 | at Dallas Cowboys | **L** 17–20 (OT) | 3–2 | AT&T Stadium | Recap |
| 6 | October 9 | **Indianapolis Colts** | **L** 28–33 | 3–3 | NRG Stadium | Recap |
| 7 | October 20 | at Pittsburgh Steelers | **L** 23–30 | 3–4 | Heinz Field | Recap |
| 8 | October 26 | at **Tennessee Titans** | **W** 30–16 | 4–4 | LP Field | Recap |
| 9 | November 2 | Philadelphia Eagles | **L** 21–31 | 4–5 | NRG Stadium | Recap |
| 10 | Bye | | | | | |
| 11 | November 16 | at Cleveland Browns | **W** 23–7 | 5–5 | FirstEnergy Stadium | Recap |
| 12 | November 23 | Cincinnati Bengals | **L** 13–22 | 5–6 | NRG Stadium | Recap |
| 13 | November 30 | **Tennessee Titans** | **W** 45–21 | 6–6 | NRG Stadium | Recap |
| 14 | December 7 | at **Jacksonville Jaguars** | **W** 27–13 | 7–6 | EverBank Field | Recap |
| 15 | December 14 | at **Indianapolis Colts** | **L** 10–17 | 7–7 | Lucas Oil Stadium | Recap |
| 16 | December 21 | Baltimore Ravens | **W** 25–13 | 8–7 | NRG Stadium | Recap |
| 17 | December 28 | **Jacksonville Jaguars** | **W** 23–17 | 9–7 | NRG Stadium | Recap |

Note: Intra-division opponents are in bold text.

=== Game summaries ===
==== Week 1: vs. Washington Redskins ====
Week One: Washington Redskins at Houston Texans – Game summary

| Quarter | 1 | 2 | 3 | 4 | Total |
|---|---|---|---|---|---|
| Redskins | 0 | 6 | 0 | 0 | **6** |
| **Texans** | 0 | 14 | 0 | 3 | **17** |

at NRG Stadium, Houston, Texas

- Date: September 7
- Game time: 12:00 p.m. CDT
- Game weather: Played indoors (retractable roof closed)
- Game attendance: 71,770
- Referee: Jerome Boger
- TV announcers (Fox): Thom Brennaman, David Diehl and Laura Okmin
- Recap, Gamebook

Game information

**First quarter**

- No scoring plays

**Second quarter**

- WAS – Darrel Young 1-yard run (kick blocked), 6:11. Redskins 6–0. **Drive: 4 plays, 46 yards, 1:37.**
- HOU – DeAndre Hopkins 79-yard pass from Ryan Fitzpatrick (Randy Bullock kick), 4:28. Texans 7–6. **Drive: 4 plays, 89 yards, 1:51.**
- HOU – Alfred Blue 5-yard blocked punt return (Randy Bullock kick), 2:15. Texans 14–6.

**Third quarter**

- No scoring plays

**Fourth quarter**

- HOU – Randy Bullock 42-yard field goal, 2:00. Texans 17–6. **Drive: 13 plays, 68 yards, 6:32.**

**Top passers**

- WAS – Robert Griffin III – 29/37, 267 yards
- HOU – Ryan Fitzpatrick – 14/22, 206 yards, TD

**Top rushers**

- WAS – Alfred Morris – 14 rushes, 91 yards
- HOU – Arian Foster – 27 rushes, 103 yards

**Top receivers**

- WAS – Niles Paul – 4 receptions, 86 yards
- HOU – Andre Johnson – 6 receptions, 93 yards

After going 2–14 in the previous season, the Texans were looking to secure a win against the Redskins. Following a slow 1st quarter, Washington got on the board first with their only scoring play of the game in the 2nd quarter. D. Young rushed for 1 yard for a touchdown, but K. Forbath's extra point was blocked. With the score, Washington led 6–0 with 6:11 left in the 2nd. Houston quickly responded with a Fitzpatrick 76 yard pass to Hopkins; with the extra point from Bullock, the Texans lead 7–6 with 4:28 left in the 2nd. The Texans kicked the ball back to the Redskins and forced a 3 and out. On the ensuing punt, Blue blocked the kicked and recovered the ball to score a touchdown. With Bullock's extra point, Houston lead 14–6 with 2:15 left in the 2nd.

Washington received the ball for the 2nd half, but Griffin fumbled the ball at the Houston 14, with J. J. Watt recovering. Houston failed to capitalize on the turnover and punted the ball back to the Redskins. The Texans received the ball at the end of the 3rd quarter before letting the clock run out. With 13:19 left to play, Foster fumbled the ball at the Washington 8. Washington also couldn't capitalize on their turnover following numerous rushing plays that resulted in 4th and 17. After receiving the ball again, Houston "chewed up" a lot of clock starting at 8:27 left to play. Following the 2 minute warning, Bullock kicked a 42-yard field goal to extend the Texans' lead to 17–6. The Redskins failed to score on their next possession, giving Houston the ball back with 1:14 left.

===== Game notes =====
With the win, the Texans started their season 1–0 and snapped their franchise-worst 14-game losing streak. This was the first regular season game with Bill O'Brien as the Texans' head coach.

==== Week 2: at Oakland Raiders ====
Week Two: Houston Texans at Oakland Raiders – Game summary

| Quarter | 1 | 2 | 3 | 4 | Total |
|---|---|---|---|---|---|
| **Texans** | 14 | 3 | 10 | 3 | **30** |
| Raiders | 0 | 0 | 0 | 14 | **14** |

at O.co Coliseum, Oakland, California

- Date: September 14
- Game time: 3:25 p.m. CDT/1:25 p.m. PDT
- Game weather: 67 °F (19 °C), sunny
- Game attendance: 54,063
- Referee: Brad Allen
- TV announcers (CBS): Andrew Catalon, Steve Beuerlein and Steve Tasker
- Recap, Gamebook

Game information

**First quarter**

- HOU – J. J. Watt 1-yard pass from Ryan Fitzpatrick (Randy Bullock kick), 9:37. Texans 7–0. **Drive: 10 plays, 80 yards, 5:23.**
- HOU – Arian Foster 5-yard run (Randy Bullock kick), 0:05. Texans 14–0. **Drive: 13 plays, 70 yards, 8:07.**

**Second quarter**

- HOU – Randy Bullock 33-yard field goal, 10:31. Texans 17–0. **Drive: 5 plays, 9 yards, 2:23.**

**Third quarter**

- HOU – DeAndre Hopkins 12-yard pass from Ryan Fitzpatrick (Randy Bullock kick), 8:29. Texans 24–0. **Drive: 5 plays, 21 yards, 2:09.**
- HOU – Randy Bullock 39-yard field goal, 3:14. Texans 27–0. **Drive: 6 plays, 24 yards, 3:53.**

**Fourth quarter**

- OAK – Darren McFadden 1-yard run (Sebastian Janikowski kick), 14:07. Texans 27–7. **Drive: 9 plays, 79 yards, 4:07.**
- HOU – Randy Bullock 46-yard field goal, 4:46. Texans 30–7. **Drive: 14 plays, 52 yards, 9:21.**
- OAK – James Jones 8-yard pass from Derek Carr (Sebastian Janikowski kick), 0:13. Texans 30–14. **Drive: 13 plays, 83 yards, 1:42.**

**Top passers**

- HOU – Ryan Fitzpatrick – 14/19, 139 yards, 2 TD
- OAK – Derek Carr – 27/42, 263 yards, TD, 2 INT

**Top rushers**

- HOU – Arian Foster – 28 rushes, 138 yards, TD
- OAK – Derek Carr – 4 rushes, 58 yards

**Top receivers**

- HOU – Andre Johnson – 6 receptions, 74 yards
- OAK – James Jones – 9 receptions, 112 yards, TD

The Texans received the ball first and started at their 20 following a touchback. Fitzpatrick connected to Foster for 41 yards for a touchdown. Following the official review, Foster was ruled out at the Oakland 1. On the following play Fitzpatrick connected with Watt (who was in as a tight end) for a touchdown, with Bullock's extra point good. The Texans scored first and lead the Raiders 7–0 with 9:41 left in the first. After the Raiders received the ball they were forced into a 3 and out, punting the ball back to Houston. The Texans managed to score on their next possession, eating up much of the clock in the process. With 0:05 left in the 1st, Houston lead Oakland 14–0.

The Raiders started the 2nd quarter with the ball following Houston's score late in the 1st. Oakland managed to get down to the Houston 31 before Carr's pass was intercepted by Jackson, who returned it for 65 yards to the Oakland 24. After an offensive holding penalty, the Texans were forced into a 2nd and 19, running for 4 yards for a 3rd and 15, before Fitzpatrick's pass fell short to Foster. On 4th and 15, Bullock kicked a 33-yard field goal to give the Texans a 17–0 lead with 10:34 left in the 2nd. The rest of the half went by quietly, with both teams failing to convert a 1st down. At the half, Houston was up 17–0.

Oakland received the ball to start the 2nd half, managing to get down to the Houston 38. Swearinger fumbled the ball (twice) before it was picked up by Joseph and returned for 49 yards to the Oakland 21. The Texans again capitalized on the turnover, this time getting a touchdown following a Fitzpatrick pass to Hopkins. Houston lead 24–0 with 8:34 left in the 3rd. After Oakland received the ball back they were hit with a 10-yard penalty, forcing a 2nd and 20. Oakland failed to get over the penalty, punting the ball on 4th and 14. Houston scored on yet another possession, with a 39-yard Bullock field goal, giving the Texans a 27–0 lead. After the Raiders got the ball back, the marched down the field to the Houston 39, before the end of the 3rd. With Oakland still yet to score, Houston lead 27–0.

Oakland's drive stayed alive after they converted on a 4th and 1. Another "saving grace" came after a defensive holding penalty for 10 yards gave the Raiders a 1st down. McFadden's 1 yard run finally put Oakland on the board, trailing 7–27 with 14:07 left to play. The Raiders kicked the ball back to the Texans, who ate up as much clock as possible with numerous running plays. Houston ended their drive with a 46-yard field goal from Bullock, giving them a 30–7 lead. On Oakland's next possession, Carr's pass was intercepted by Reed at the Oakland 15 and ran it to the 11. Going into a 4th and 8, Bullock attempted a 27-yard field goal, but it was blocked. Following the blocked kick, the Raiders started at their 17 before getting another touchdown to trail 14–30 with 0:14 left. Oakland attempted an onside kick, but went out of bounds, but two offsetting penalties gave the Raiders another chance. On the second attempt, the Texans recovered the ball to win the game 30–14.

===== Game notes =====
With the win, the Texans started a season 2–0 for the fifth year in a row and matched their win total from the 2013 season. This was the only game of the 2014 season where the Texans scored in the 1st quarter until week 7 against the Steelers.

==== Week 3: at New York Giants ====
Week Three: Houston Texans at New York Giants – Game summary

| Quarter | 1 | 2 | 3 | 4 | Total |
|---|---|---|---|---|---|
| Texans | 0 | 0 | 10 | 7 | **17** |
| **Giants** | 0 | 14 | 3 | 13 | **30** |

at MetLife Stadium, East Rutherford, New Jersey

- Date: September 21
- Game time: 1:00 p.m. EDT/12:00 p.m. CDT
- Game weather: 70 °F (21 °C), cloudy
- Game attendance: 77,462
- Referee: Terry McAulay
- TV announcers (CBS): Ian Eagle, Dan Fouts and Jenny Dell
- Recap, Gamebook

Game information

**First quarter**

- No scoring plays

**Second quarter**

- NYG – Victor Cruz 26-yard pass from Eli Manning (Josh Brown kick), 3:21. Giants 7–0. **Drive: 9 plays, 83 yards, 4:23.**
- NYG – Rashad Jennings 1-yard run (Josh Brown kick), 1:07. Giants 14–0. **Drive: 3 plays, 2 yards, 0:41.**

**Third quarter**

- NYG – Josh Brown 39-yard field goal, 10:39. Giants 17–0. **Drive: 6 plays, 24 yards, 2:34.**
- HOU – Randy Bullock 27-yard field goal, 6:09. Giants 17–3. **Drive: 9 plays, 71 yards, 4:30.**
- HOU – Damaris Johnson 44-yard pass from Ryan Fitzpatrick (Randy Bullock kick), 2:13. Giants 17–10. **Drive: 4 plays, 93 yards, 2:03.**

**Fourth quarter**

- NYG – Josh Brown 29-yard field goal, 12:19. Giants 20–10. **Drive: 10 plays, 66 yards, 4:54.**
- NYG – Daniel Fells 9-yard pass from Eli Manning (Josh Brown kick), 9:25. Giants 27–10. **Drive: 3 plays, 29 yards, 1:06.**
- NYG – Josh Brown 31-yard field goal, 5:33. Giants 30–10. **Drive: 7 plays, 16 yards, 3:39.**
- HOU – Ryan Fitzpatrick 1-yard run (Randy Bullock kick), 2:00. Giants 30–17. **Drive: 8 plays, 80 yards, 3:33.**

**Top passers**

- HOU – Ryan Fitzpatrick – 20/34, 289 yards, TD, 3 INT
- NYG – Eli Manning – 21/28, 234 yards, 2 TD

**Top rushers**

- HOU – Alfred Blue – 13 rushes, 78 yards
- NYG – Rashad Jennings – 34 rushes, 176 yards, TD

**Top receivers**

- HOU – DeAndre Hopkins – 6 receptions, 116 yards
- NYG – Victor Cruz – 5 receptions, 107 yards, TD

In what would become typical for the Texans' 2014 season, the offense was relatively quiet, not scoring at all in the first half. The Giants would lead 14–0 at the end of the half. The offensive problems for Houston would continue into the 2nd half, with a couple of turnovers that occurred. Unable to comeback, the Texans fell 17–30 to the Giants.

===== Game notes =====
Not only was the first game of the season Houston lost (2-1), but it was also the first game the New York Giants won (1-2).

==== Week 4: vs. Buffalo Bills ====
Week Four: Buffalo Bills at Houston Texans – Game summary

| Quarter | 1 | 2 | 3 | 4 | Total |
|---|---|---|---|---|---|
| Bills | 0 | 10 | 0 | 7 | **17** |
| **Texans** | 0 | 7 | 10 | 6 | **23** |

at NRG Stadium, Houston, Texas

- Date: September 28
- Game time: 12:00 p.m. CDT
- Game weather: Played indoors (retractable roof closed)
- Game attendance: 71,756
- Referee: Bill Vinovich
- TV announcers (CBS): Spero Dedes and Solomon Wilcots
- Recap, Gamebook

Game information

**First quarter**

- No scoring plays

**Second quarter**

- BUF – Dan Carpenter 31-yard field goal, 11:37. Bills 3–0. **Drive: 13 plays, 67 yards, 6:13.**
- BUF – Sammy Watkins 5-yard pass from E. J. Manuel (Dan Carpenter kick), 5:54. Bills 10–0. **Drive: 8 plays, 49 yards, 3:56.**
- HOU – DeAndre Hopkins 35-yard pass from Ryan Fitzpatrick (Randy Bullock kick), 0:57. Bills 10–7. **Drive: 8 plays, 80 yards, 2:32.**

**Third quarter**

- HOU – J. J. Watt 80-yard interception return (Randy Bullock kick), 13:28. Texans 14–10.
- HOU – Randy Bullock 41-yard field goal, 6:14. Texans 17–10. **Drive: 12 plays, 42 yards, 6:10.**

**Fourth quarter**

- HOU – Randy Bullock 55-yard field goal, 9:21. Texans 20–10. **Drive: 4 plays, 7 yards, 1:30.**
- BUF – Mike Williams 80-yard pass from E. J. Manuel (Dan Carpenter kick), 9:08. Texans 20–17. **Drive: 1 play, 80 yards, 0:13.**
- HOU – Randy Bullock 50-yard field goal, 4:49. Texans 23–17. **Drive: 8 plays, 32 yards, 4:19.**

**Top passers**

- BUF – E. J. Manuel – 21/44, 225 yards, 2 TD, 2 INT
- HOU – Ryan Fitzpatrick – 25/37, 268 yards, TD, 2 INT

**Top rushers**

- BUF – C. J. Spiller – 15 rushes, 60 yards
- HOU – Ryan Fitzpatrick – 5 rushes, 14 yards

**Top receivers**

- BUF – Mike Williams – 2 receptions, 84 yards, TD
- HOU – Andre Johnson – 6 receptions, 71 yards

After the Bills took a lead of 10–0 in the 2nd quarter, the Texans scored 20 unanswered points to put them ahead 20–10. The Bills scored a touchdown to trail 17–20 in the 4th quarter, but Houston responded with a field goal from Bullock in the 4th to put it away, winning the game 23–17.

===== Game notes =====
This was the first time Texans quarterback Ryan Fitzpatrick faced his former team since being cut in 2013. With the win, the Texans went 3-1 and surpassed their win total from the previous season.

==== Week 5: at Dallas Cowboys ====
Week Five: Houston Texans at Dallas Cowboys – Game summary

| Quarter | 1 | 2 | 3 | 4 | OT | Total |
|---|---|---|---|---|---|---|
| Texans | 0 | 0 | 7 | 10 | 0 | **17** |
| **Cowboys** | 0 | 3 | 7 | 7 | 3 | **20** |

at AT&T Stadium, Arlington, Texas

- Date: October 5
- Game time: 12:00 p.m. CDT
- Game weather: Played indoors (retractable roof closed)
- Game attendance: 91,159
- Referee: Pete Morelli
- TV announcers (CBS): Ian Eagle, Dan Fouts and Jenny Dell
- Recap, Gamebook

Game information

**First quarter**

- No scoring plays

**Second quarter**

- DAL – Dan Bailey 33-yard field goal, 0:11. Cowboys 3–0. **Drive: 12 plays, 65 yards, 4:37.**

**Third quarter**

- HOU – Arian Foster 15-yard run (Randy Bullock kick), 8:49. Texans 7–3. **Drive: 6 plays, 71 yards, 3:22.**
- DAL – Terrance Williams 43-yard pass from Tony Romo (Dan Bailey kick), 6:08. Cowboys 10–7. **Drive: 4 plays, 78 yards, 2:41.**

**Fourth quarter**

- DAL – Dez Bryant 2-yard pass from Tony Romo (Dan Bailey kick), 9:44. Cowboys 17–7. **Drive: 4 plays, 30 yards, 2:16.**
- HOU – Randy Bullock 29-yard field goal, 2:27. Cowboys 17–10. **Drive: 13 plays, 76 yards, 7:17.**
- HOU – Arian Foster 1-yard run (Randy Bullock kick), 0:41. Tied 17–17. **Drive: 4 plays, 45 yards, 1:18.**

**Overtime**

- DAL – Dan Bailey 49-yard field goal, 7:45. Cowboys 20–17. **Drive: 9 plays, 59 yards, 5:10.**

**Top passers**

- HOU – Ryan Fitzpatrick – 16/25, 154 yards, INT
- DAL – Tony Romo – 28/41, 324 yards, 2 TD, INT

**Top rushers**

- HOU – Arian Foster – 23 rushes, 157 yards, 2 TD
- DAL – DeMarco Murray – 31 rushes, 136 yards

**Top receivers**

- HOU – DeAndre Hopkins – 6 receptions, 63 yards
- DAL – Dez Bryant – 9 receptions, 85 yards, TD

Looking to keep up their win streak, the Texans traveled to Dallas for the battle for the Governor's Cup against the Dallas Cowboys. The only score of the first half came from a 33-yard Dan Bailey field goal with 0:16 left in the 2nd quarter. Houston scored with 8:56 left in the 3rd on an Arian Foster 15 yard run, leading 7–3. Dallas answered back with a 43-yard pass from Romo to Williams for a touchdown. After both teams forced a 3 and out, Dallas scored again to lead 17–7 with 9:50 left in the 4th. Houston answered back with a 29-yard field goal from Bullock with 2:31 left to trail 10–17. Dallas was penalized for a delay of game following a Houston timeout which lead to 4th down and 16. Following the penalty, the Texans got the ball back before tying the game with 0:41 left in regulation. Following a timeout called by both teams, Bailey's 53 yard field goal was no good, sending the game into overtime.

Houston received the ball first, but was forced to punt the ball back from the Dallas 48. Dallas won the game following a Dan Bailey 49 yard field goal.

===== Game notes =====
In a historic game between the two Texas teams, both the Texans and Cowboys boasted a winning record (3-1) for the first time while meeting. With the win, Dallas leads the regular season series 3–1. The only time the Texans beat the Cowboys during the regular season was during the 2002 season, which was also the franchise's first win.

==== Week 6: vs. Indianapolis Colts ====
Week Six: Indianapolis Colts at Houston Texans – Game summary

| Quarter | 1 | 2 | 3 | 4 | Total |
|---|---|---|---|---|---|
| **Colts** | 24 | 3 | 6 | 0 | **33** |
| Texans | 0 | 14 | 7 | 7 | **28** |

at NRG Stadium, Houston, Texas

- Date: October 9
- Game time: 7:30 p.m. CDT
- Game weather: Played indoors (retractable roof closed)
- Game attendance: 71,787
- Referee: Ron Torbert
- TV announcers (CBS/NFLN): Jim Nantz, Phil Simms and Tracy Wolfson
- Recap, Gamebook

Game information

**First quarter**

- IND 11:13 – Adam Vinatieri 27 yard field goal, IND 3–0
- IND 10:40 – Trent Richardson 2 yard run (Adam Vinatieri kick), IND 10–0
- IND 7:00 – Ahmad Bradshaw 5 yard pass from Andrew Luck (Adam Vinatieri kick), IND 17–0
- IND 0:00 – Coby Fleener 4 yard pass from Andrew Luck, IND 24–0

**Second quarter**

- HOU 9:43 – Andre Johnson 4 yard pass from Ryan Fitzpatrick (Randy Bullock kick), IND 24–7
- HOU 8:22 – Arian Foster 12 yard run (Randy Bullock kick), IND 24–14
- IND 1:05 – Adam Vinatieri 34 yard field goal, IND 27–14

**Third quarter**

- HOU 5:59 – Arian Foster 2 yard run (Randy Bullock kick), IND 27–21
- IND 2:52 – T. Y. Hilton 33 yard pass from Andrew Luck, IND 33–21

**Fourth quarter**

- HOU 10:36 – J. J. Watt 45 yard fumble return (Randy Bullock kick), IND 33–28

**Top passers**

- IND – Andrew Luck 25/44, 370 yards, 3 TD, INT
- HOU – Ryan Fitzpatrick 15/23, 212 yards, TD

**Top rushers**

- IND – Trent Richardson 17 carries, 41 yards, TD
- HOU – Arian Foster 20 carries, 109 yards, TD

**Top receivers**

- IND – T. Y. Hilton 9 receptions, 223 yards, TD
- HOU – Andre Johnson 7 receptions, 99 yards, TD

**Top tacklers**

- IND – D'Qwell Jackson 5 solo tackles, 2 assists, 1 sack, 1 tackle for loss, 1 QB hit
- HOU – Kendrick Lewis 6 solo tackles, 4 assists

Following a tough loss in overtime in Dallas, the Texans went home for a Thursday night divisional duel with the Indianapolis Colts. Houston received the ball first, but punted the ball on 4th and 5 from their 25. After receiving the ball, the Colts ended their drive with a 27-yard field goal to lead 3–0 with 11:17 left in the 1st. In a surprise move, the Colts did an onside kick and recovered the ball on their 46. Luck threw a 54-yard pass for a touchdown, but the call was reversed as the runner was down. Luck threw another pass, this time for 49 yards, to get up to the Houston 5. Richardson rushed for a touchdown to give the Colts a 10–0 lead over the Texans. On their next 2 possessions, Houston was forced into a 3 and out, with Indianapolis scoring on their next possessions. Following a difficult 1st quarter, the Texans trailed 0-24.

The 2nd quarter seemed to hold more good fortunes for the Texans, as they got a 1st down following a penalty against the Colts on what would have been a field goal attempt. Houston finally scored with a touchdown to trail 7–24 with 9:48 left in the 2nd. Momentum for the Texans continued as Luck's pass was intercepted by Tuggle at the Indianapolis 34, taking it to the 26. Houston wasted no time before capitalizing on the turnover to score a touchdown with 8:28 left to trail 14–24. The Colts ate up the clock on their next possession, before kick a 34-yard field goal with 1:09 left to lead 27–14. Things seemed to turn against Houston again on their next possession as Fitzpatrick was sacked and they failed to complete 1st down conversion on 4th and 9 with 0:03 left in the 2nd. At halftime, the Texans were trailing 14–27.

The 3rd quarter started out quietly for both teams before Houston scored a touchdown with 6:03 left, to trail 21–27. The Colts scored on their next possession and failed on a two-point conversion to lead 33–21. With Houston trying to get ahead, they ended the 3rd quarter at the Indianapolis 24, trailing 21–33.

With 14:23 left to play, Bullock missed a 37-yard field goal that went wide right. After a Colts fumble, Watt returned it for 45 yards for a touchdown. Watt's fumble return helped keep hopes of a comeback alive for the Texans, as they now trailed 28–33. The Houston defense held off the Indianapolis offense, who were forced to punt the ball back. The Texans could not manage a comeback as they fumbled the ball on each of their next 2 possessions. The Texans fell to the Colts, 28–33, dropped to 2nd place in the AFC South and dropped to 3-3.

===== Game notes =====
The 24 point deficit at the end of the 1st quarter is one of the largest in Texans history. This is the fourth time in a row that the Colts have won against the Texans.

==== Week 7: at Pittsburgh Steelers ====
Week Seven: Houston Texans at Pittsburgh Steelers – Game summary

| Quarter | 1 | 2 | 3 | 4 | Total |
|---|---|---|---|---|---|
| Texans | 7 | 6 | 0 | 10 | **23** |
| **Steelers** | 0 | 24 | 0 | 6 | **30** |

at Heinz Field, Pittsburgh, Pennsylvania

- Date: October 20
- Game time: 8:30 p.m. EDT/7:30 p.m. CDT
- Game weather: 57 °F (14 °C), cloudy
- Game attendance: 56,375
- Referee: Walt Coleman
- TV announcers (ESPN): Mike Tirico, Jon Gruden and Lisa Salters
- Recap, Gamebook

Game information

**First quarter**

- HOU 5:55 – Alfred Blue 11 yard pass from Ryan Fitzpatrick (Randy Bullock kick), HOU 7–0

**Second quarter**

- HOU 13:34 – Randy Bullock 39 yard field goal, HOU 10–0
- HOU 7:16 – Randy Bullock 38 yard field goal, HOU 13–0
- PIT 3:08 – Shaun Suisham 44 yard field foal, HOU 13–3
- PIT 1:27 – Martavis Bryant 35 yard pass from Ben Roethlisberger (Shaun Suisham kick), HOU 13–10
- PIT 1:03 – Lance Moore 3 yard pass from Antonio Brown (Shaun Suisham kick), PIT 17–13
- PIT 0:14 – Le'Veon Bell 2 yard pass from Ben Roethlisberger (Shaun Suisham kick), PIT 24–13

**Third quarter**

- No scoring plays

**Fourth quarter**

- HOU 11:47 – Randy Bullock 31 yard field goal, PIT 24–16
- PIT 5:50 – Shaun Suisham 30 yard field goal, PIT 27–16
- PIT 3:04 – Shaun Suisham 40 yard field goal, PIT 30–16
- HOU 1:31 – Arian Foster 1 yard pass from Ryan Fitzpatrick (Randy Bullock kick), PIT 30–23

**Top passers**

- HOU – Ryan Fitzpatrick 21/32, 262 yards, 2 TD, INT
- PIT – Ben Roethlisberger 23/33, 265 yards, 2 TD

**Top rushers**

- HOU – Arian Foster 20 carries, 102 yards
- PIT – Le'Veon Bell 12 carries, 57 yards

**Top receivers**

- HOU – DeAndre Hopkins 6 receptions, 108 yards
- PIT – Antonio Brown 9 receptions, 90 yards

**Top tacklers**

- HOU – Mike Mohamed 5 solo tackles, 1 assist, 1 tackle for loss
- PIT – Lawrence Timmons 11 solo tackles, 1 assist, 1 sack, 2 tackles for loss, 1 QB hit

After falling to the Colts at home, the Texans visited Pittsburgh for the first time since 2008, doing battle on Monday night with the Pittsburgh Steelers. While the Texans defense held off the Steelers' offense, the offense managed to gain much-needed momentum in the 1st quarter, a place they had previously struggled. The Texans scored first with 5:55 left after Blue caught a pass from Fitzpatrick to lead 7–0. In the second quarter Ben Roethlisberger was sacked by Watt and fumbled the ball near midfield. Houston capitalized on the turnover with a Bullock 39 yard field goal to lead 10–0 with 13:39 left in the 2nd. Houston continued their trend of scoring on each possession with another Bullock field goal (38 yards) to extend their lead to 13–0 with 7:20 left; part of the same drive included the Texans converting on a 4th down and inches. The Steelers finally managed to get on the board with a 44-yard field goal from Shaun Suisham to trail 3–13 with 3:13 left. After forcing a 3 and out for the Texans, the Steelers struck back with a 35-yard touchdown pass from Roerhlisberger to Bryant to trail 10–13 with 1:27 left. After a Houston fumble at their 4-yard line, Pittsburgh took their first lead of the night to lead 17–13 with 1:03 remaining. The Steelers scored off of another Texans turnover after a Fitzpatrick pass was deflected to extend their lead with 0:14 left in the half. Following a series of Houston turnovers in arguably the worst-played three minutes in NFL history, Pittsburgh lead 24–13 at the half. After Suisham made two fourth quarter field goals, from 30 yards (27-16) and 40 yards (30-16), respectively, The Texans tried to rally for the remainder of the game with a Foster TD catch to make it 30–23, and almost pulled off an onside kick recovery, but Pittsburgh managed to avoid a disaster.

===== Game notes =====
This was the first game since week 2 against the Raiders that the Texans scored in the 1st quarter. However, with their 3rd straight loss, the Texans fell to 3–4.

==== Week 8: at Tennessee Titans ====
Week Eight: Houston Texans at Tennessee Titans – Game summary

| Quarter | 1 | 2 | 3 | 4 | Total |
|---|---|---|---|---|---|
| **Texans** | 0 | 13 | 14 | 3 | **30** |
| Titans | 3 | 0 | 6 | 7 | **16** |

at LP Field, Nashville, Tennessee

- Date: October 26
- Game time: 12:00 p.m. CDT
- Game weather: 73 °F (23 °C), sunny
- Game attendance: 69,143
- Referee: Bill Leavy
- TV announcers (Fox): Kenny Albert, Daryl Johnston and Tony Siragusa
- Recap, Gamebook

Game information

**First quarter**

- TEN 10:23 – Ryan Succop 35 yard field goal, TEN 3–0

**Second quarter**

- HOU 7:36 – Randy Bullock 30 yard field goal, tied 3–3
- HOU 6:00 – Arian Foster 34 yard run (Randy Bullock kick), HOU 10–3
- HOU 0:19 – Randy Bullock 29 yard field goal, HOU 13–3

**Third quarter**

- HOU 12:35 – Arian Foster 5 yard pass from Ryan Fitzpatrick (Randy Bullock kick), HOU 20–3
- HOU 5:42 – Arian Foster 1 yard run (Randy Bullock kick), HOU 27–3
- TEN 2:12 – Delanie Walker 6 yard pass from Zach Mettenberger, HOU 27–9

**Fourth quarter**

- HOU 14:12 – Randy Bullock 49 yard field goal, HOU 30–9
- TEN 0:56 – Justin Hunter 12 yard pass from Zach Mettenberger (Ryan Succop kick), HOU 30–16

**Top passers**

- HOU – Ryan Fitzpatrick 19/35, 227 yards, TD
- TEN – Zach Mettenberger 27/41, 299 yards, 2 TD, INT

**Top rushers**

- HOU – Arian Foster 20 carries, 151 yards, 2 TD
- TEN – Bishop Sankey 9 carries, 35 yards

**Top receivers**

- HOU – DeAndre Hopkins 5 receptions, 95 yards
- TEN – Nate Washington 4 receptions, 68 yards

**Top tacklers**

- HOU – Mike Mohamed 8 solo tackles, 2 assists
- TEN – Avery Williamson 8 solo tackles, 2 assists, 1 sack, 2 tackles for loss, 1 pass deflected, 1 QB hit

In yet another game where Houston did not score in the 1st quarter, the Titans took an early lead with a 35-yard field goal from Brinkley to lead 3–0 with 10:28 left. The Texans got their first scoring play of the day with a Bullock 30 yard field goal to tie the game 3–3 with 7:41 left in the 2nd. Following a three-and-out for Tennessee with 2 penalties (one on the punt), Houston wasted no time to score the game's first touchdown following a 34-yard rush from Foster to lead 10–3 with 6:12 left in the half. Bullock kicked a 29-yard field goal to extend the Texans' lead to 13-3 going into halftime.

The Titans received the ball to start off the 2nd half, but Mettenberger was sacked and fumbled the ball and was recovered by Watt. Houston quickly capitalized on the turnover with a 5-yard pass from Fitzpatrick to Foster to lead 20–3 with 12:39 left in the 3rd. The Texans scored on their next possession to lead 27–3 with 5:47 left in the 3rd. The Titans scored their first touchdown of the game on their next possession with a 6-yard pass from Mettenberger to Walker. With a failed two-point conversion, Tennessee trailed 9–27 with 2:17 left in the third. On the Houston's 3rd play of the 4th quarter, Bullock kicked a 49-yard field goal to extend the lead to 30–9 with 14:17 left to play. The Titans scored a touchdown with 1:02 left to trail 30–16. Blue recovered the onside kick, with Fitzpatrick taking a kneel on the next 2 plays to end the game.

===== Game notes =====
With the win, the Texans went to 4–4, snapped their three-game losing streak and held onto 2nd place in the AFC South.

==== Week 9: vs. Philadelphia Eagles ====
Battle Red Day

Week Nine: Philadelphia Eagles at Houston Texans – Game summary

| Quarter | 1 | 2 | 3 | 4 | Total |
|---|---|---|---|---|---|
| **Eagles** | 7 | 10 | 7 | 7 | **31** |
| Texans | 7 | 7 | 0 | 7 | **21** |

at NRG Stadium, Houston, Texas

- Date: November 2
- Game time: 12:00 p.m. CST
- Game weather: Played indoors (retractable roof closed)
- Game attendance: 71,780
- Referee: John Parry
- TV announcers (Fox): Kenny Albert, Daryl Johnston and Tony Siragusa
- Recap, Gamebook

Game information

**First quarter**

- PHI 8:30 – Jeremy Maclin 59 yard pass from Nick Foles (Cody Parkey kick), PHI 7–0
- HOU 3:11 – A. J. Bouye 51 yard interception return (Randy Bullock kick), tied 7–7

**Second quarter**

- PHI 10:41 – Jordan Matthews 11 yard pass from Mark Sanchez (Cody Parkey kick), PHI 14–7
- HOU 3:58 – Arian Foster 56 yard pass from Ryan Fitzpatrick (Randy Bullock kick), tied 14–14
- PHI 0:00 – Cody Parkey 45 yard field goal, PHI 17–14

**Third quarter**

- PHI 2:40 – Chris Polk 8 yard run (Cody Parkey kick), PHI 24–14

**Fourth quarter**

- HOU 11:51 – DeAndre Hopkins 7 yard pass from Ryan Fitzpatrick (Randy Bullock kick), PHI 24–21
- PHI 3:50 – Jeremy Maclin 8 yard pass from Mark Sanchez (Cody Parkey kick), PHI 31–21

**Top passers**

- PHI – Mark Sanchez 15/22, 202 yards, 2 TD, 2 INT
- HOU – Ryan Fitzpatrick 13/27, 203 yards, 2 TD, INT

**Top rushers**

- PHI – LeSean McCoy 24 carries, 117 yards
- HOU – Arian Foster 15 carries, 56 yards

**Top receivers**

- PHI – Jeremy Maclin 6 receptions, 158 yards, 2 TD
- HOU – DeAndre Hopkins 6 receptions, 115 yards, TD

**Top tacklers**

- PHI – Mychal Kendricks 5 solo tackles, 7 assists, 1 sack, 1 tackle for loss, 2 QB hits
- HOU – Whitney Mercilus 5 solo tackles, 4 assists, 2 sacks, 2 tackles for loss, 3 QB hits

This would be the first time since 2003 that the Texans would wear their Battle Red uniforms against an NFC team. After falling to the Eagles, the Texans entered their bye 4–5. It was later announced that starting quarterback Ryan Fitzpatrick would be benched in favor of Ryan Mallett.

==== Week 11: at Cleveland Browns ====
Week Eleven: Houston Texans at Cleveland Browns – Game summary

| Quarter | 1 | 2 | 3 | 4 | Total |
|---|---|---|---|---|---|
| **Texans** | 7 | 7 | 3 | 6 | **23** |
| Browns | 0 | 7 | 0 | 0 | **7** |

at FirstEnergy Stadium, Cleveland, Ohio

- Date: November 16
- Game time: 12:00 p.m. CST
- Game weather: 34 °F (1 °C), cloudy
- Game attendance: 67,431
- Referee: Ed Hochuli
- TV announcers (CBS): Andrew Catalon, Steve Beuerlein and Steve Tasker
- Recap, Gamebook

Game information

**First quarter**

- HOU 7:09 – J. J. Watt 2 yard pass from Ryan Mallett (Randy Bullock kick), HOU 7–0

**Second quarter**

- CLE 8:58 – Andrew Hawkins 32 yard pass from Brian Hoyer (Billy Cundiff kick), tied 7–7
- HOU 0:23 – Garrett Graham 20 yard pass from Ryan Mallett (Randy Bullock kick), HOU 14–7

**Third quarter**

- HOU 5:16 – Randy Bullock 46 yard field goal, HOU 17–7

**Fourth quarter**

- HOU 9:47 – Randy Bullock 37 yard field goal, HOU 20–7
- HOU 2:47 – Randy Bullock 50 yard field goal, HOU 23–7

**Top passers**

- HOU – Ryan Mallett 20/30, 211 yards, 2 TD, INT
- CLE – Brian Hoyer 20/50, 330 yards, TD, INT

**Top rushers**

- HOU – Alfred Blue 36 carries, 156 yards
- CLE – Isaiah Crowell 14 carries, 61 yards, 1 fumble

**Top receivers**

- HOU – DeAndre Hopkins 4 receptions, 80 yards
- CLE – Andrew Hawkins 6 receptions, 97 yards, TD

**Top tacklers**

- HOU – A. J. Bouye 9 solo tackles, 1 assist, 1 pass deflected
- CLE – Joe Haden 10 solo tackles, 3 assists, 1 pass deflected

Coming off of their bye week, the Texans faced the Cleveland Browns on the road in Ryan Mallett's first career start. Mallett passed for his first career touchdown to J. J. Watt to give the Texans an early 7–0 lead. Cleveland scored in the 2nd quarter to tie the game 7-7, which would be their only score of the entire game. Houston scored the last touchdown of the game after Mallett connected with Garrett Graham to lead 14-7 going into halftime. The Texans' defense completely shutout the Browns during the second half, while Houston's only scores came from 3 Randy Bullock field goals.

Following the win, the Texans went to 5-5 and started 1-0 under Mallett.

==== Week 12: vs. Cincinnati Bengals ====
Week Twelve: Cincinnati Bengals at Houston Texans – Game summary

| Quarter | 1 | 2 | 3 | 4 | Total |
|---|---|---|---|---|---|
| **Bengals** | 7 | 2 | 7 | 6 | **22** |
| Texans | 0 | 3 | 10 | 0 | **13** |

at NRG Stadium, Houston, Texas

- Date: November 23
- Game time: 12:00 p.m. CST
- Game weather: 71 °F (22 °C), sunny (retractable roof open)
- Game attendance: 71,777
- Referee: Terry McAulay
- TV announcers (CBS): Ian Eagle, Dan Fouts and Jenny Dell
- Recap, Gamebook

Game information

**First quarter**

- CIN 1:19 – Mohamed Sanu 6 yard pass from Andy Dalton (Mike Nugent kick), CIN 7–0

**Second quarter**

- CIN 8:57 – Alfred Blue tackled in end zone by Geno Atkins, CIN 9–0
- HOU 1:45 – Randy Bullock 36 yard field goal, CIN 9–3

**Third quarter**

- CIN 11:48 – Jeremy Hill 2 yard run (Mike Nugent kick), CIN 16–3
- HOU 7:19 – Johnathan Joseph 60 yard interception return (Randy Bullock kick), CIN 16–10
- HOU 1:48 – Randy Bullock 25 yard field goal, CIN 16–13

**Fourth quarter**

- CIN 8:48 – Mike Nugent 31 yard field goal, CIN 19–13
- CIN 1:55 – Mike Nugent 49 yard field goal, CIN 22–13

**Top passers**

- CIN – Andy Dalton 24/35, 233 yards, TD, INT
- HOU – Ryan Mallett 21/45, 189 yards, INT

**Top rushers**

- CIN – Jeremy Hill 18 carries, 87 yards, TD
- HOU – Alfred Blue 16 carries, 46 yards

**Top receivers**

- CIN – A. J. Green 12 receptions, 121 yards
- HOU – Garrett Graham 4 receptions, 41 yards

**Top tacklers**

- CIN – Vincent Rey 4 solo tackles, 6 assists
- HOU – Daryl Morris 7 solo tackles, 3 assists, 3 passes deflected

The Texans fell to Andy Dalton for the first time. With the loss, the Texans fell to 5–6.

==== Week 13: vs. Tennessee Titans ====
Week Thirteen: Tennessee Titans at Houston Texans – Game summary

| Quarter | 1 | 2 | 3 | 4 | Total |
|---|---|---|---|---|---|
| Titans | 0 | 0 | 14 | 7 | **21** |
| **Texans** | 14 | 10 | 7 | 14 | **45** |

at NRG Stadium, Houston, Texas

- Date: November 30
- Game time: 12:00 p.m. CST
- Game weather: 76 °F (24 °C), partly cloudy (retractable roof open)
- Game attendance: 71,714
- Referee: Jeff Triplette
- TV announcers (CBS): Kevin Harlan and Rich Gannon
- Recap, Gamebook

Game information

**First quarter**

- HOU 7:34 – Ryan Griffin 8 yard pass from Ryan Fitzpatrick (Randy Bullock kick), HOU 7–0
- HOU 4:50 – Arian Foster 7 yard pass from Ryan Fitzpatrick (Randy Bullock kick), HOU 14–0

**Second quarter**

- HOU 3:25 – Randy Bullock 37 yard field goal, HOU 17–0
- HOU 0:38 – DeAndre Hopkins 58 yard pass from Ryan Fitzpatrick (Randy Bullock kick), HOU 24–0

**Third quarter**

- TEN 12:14 – Kendall Wright 36 yard pass from Zach Mettenberger (Ryan Succop kick), HOU 24–7
- TEN 8:07 – Jason McCourty 62 yard fumble return (Ryan Succop kick), HOU 24–14
- HOU 4:40 – DeAndre Hopkins 34 yard pass from Ryan Fitzpatrick (Randy Bullock kick), HOU 31–14

**Fourth quarter**

- HOU 11:05 – Andre Johnson 4 yard pass from Ryan Fitzpatrick (Randy Bullock kick), HOU 38–14
- HOU 8:56 – J. J. Watt 1 yard pass from Ryan Fitzpatrick (Randy Bullock kick), HOU 45–14
- TEN 1:06 – Nate Washington 25 yard pass from Jake Locker (Ryan Succop kick), HOU 45–21

**Top passers**

- TEN – Zach Mettenberger 13/19, 184 yards, TD, INT
- HOU – Ryan Fitzpatrick 24/33, 358 yards, 6 TD

**Top rushers**

- TEN – Bishop Sankey 10 carries, 42 yards
- HOU – Arian Foster 19 carries, 79 yards

**Top receivers**

- TEN – Kendall Wright 7 receptions, 132 yards, TD
- HOU – DeAndre Hopkins 9 receptions, 238 yards, 2 TD

**Top tacklers**

- TEN – George Wilson 7 solo tackles, 2 assists, 1 tackle for loss, 1 pass deflected
- HOU – D. J. Swearinger 4 solo tackles, 3 assists

Following Ryan Mallett's injury the previous week against the Bengals, Ryan Fitzpatrick started for the first time since week 9 against the Eagles. Fitzpatrick had a career day, throwing for 6 touchdown passes to five different receivers in the Texans' 45–21 win, a franchise record. The Texans improved to 6-6 and their 45 points were the most in franchise history until Week 4 of the 2017 season, when they again defeated the Titans 57–14.

==== Week 14: at Jacksonville Jaguars ====
Week Fourteen: Houston Texans at Jacksonville Jaguars – Game summary

| Quarter | 1 | 2 | 3 | 4 | Total |
|---|---|---|---|---|---|
| **Texans** | 3 | 7 | 7 | 10 | **27** |
| Jaguars | 7 | 6 | 0 | 0 | **13** |

at EverBank Field, Jacksonville, Florida

- Date: December 7
- Game time: 1:00 p.m. EST/12:00 p.m. CST
- Game weather: 61 °F (16 °C), 10% Chance of rain
- Game attendance: 61,070
- Referee: Carl Cheffers
- TV announcers (CBS): Brian Anderson and Adam Archuleta
- Recap, Gamebook

Game information

**First quarter**

- JAX 3:39 – Allen Hurns 4 yard pass from Blake Bortles (Josh Scobee kick), JAX 7–0
- HOU 1:22 – Randy Bullock 44 yard field goal, JAX 7–3

**Second quarter**

- HOU 11:45 – Ryan Fitzpatrick 4 yard run (Randy Bullock kick), HOU 10–7
- JAX 5:53 – Josh Scobee 33 yard field goal, tied 10–10
- JAX 1:09 – Josh Scobee 37 yard field goal, JAX 13–10

**Third quarter**

- HOU 3:23 – Alfred Blue 1 yard run (Randy Bullock kick), HOU 17–13

**Fourth quarter**

- HOU 14:23 – Arian Foster 1 yard run (Randy Bullock kick), HOU 24–13
- HOU 8:39 – Randy Bullock 44 yard field goal, HOU 27–13

**Top passers**

- HOU – Ryan Fitzpatrick 13/19, 135 yards
- JAX – Blake Bortles 20/39, 205 yards, TD, INT

**Top rushers**

- HOU – Arian Foster 24 carries, 127 yards, TD
- JAX – Denard Robinson 10 carries, 30 yards

**Top receivers**

- HOU – DeAndre Hopkins 4 receptions, 49 yards
- JAX – Marcedes Lewis 3 receptions, 69 yards

**Top tacklers**

- HOU – Mike Mohamed 4 solo tackles, 3 assists, 1 pass deflected
- JAX – Johnathan Cyprien 5 solo tackles, 3 assists

With the win, the Texans improved to 7–6.

==== Week 15: at Indianapolis Colts ====
Week Fifteen: Houston Texans at Indianapolis Colts – Game summary

| Quarter | 1 | 2 | 3 | 4 | Total |
|---|---|---|---|---|---|
| Texans | 7 | 0 | 0 | 3 | **10** |
| **Colts** | 0 | 14 | 0 | 3 | **17** |

at Lucas Oil Stadium, Indianapolis, Indiana

- Date: December 14
- Game time: 1:00 p.m. EST/12:00 p.m. CST
- Game weather: Played indoors (retractable roof closed)
- Game attendance: 65,148
- Referee: Gene Steratore
- TV announcers (CBS): Kevin Harlan, Rich Gannon and Lauren Gardner
- Recap, Gamebook

Game information

**First quarter**

- HOU 5:56 – Kendrick Lewis 27 yard interception return (Randy Bullock kick), HOU 7–0

**Second quarter**

- IND 14:53 – Hakeem Nicks 26 yard pass from Andrew Luck (Adam Vinatieri kick), tied 7–7
- IND 6:21 – Dwayne Allen 3 yard pass from Andrew Luck (Adam Vinatieri kick), IND 14–7

**Third quarter**

- No scoring plays

**Fourth quarter**

- HOU 13:40 – Randy Bullock 53 yard field goal, IND 14–10
- IND 2:11 – Adam Vinatieri 29 yard field goal, IND 17–10

**Top passers**

- HOU – Tom Savage 10/19, 127 yards, INT
- IND – Andrew Luck 18/34, 187 yards, 2 TD, INT

**Top rushers**

- HOU – Arian Foster 26 carries, 99 yards
- IND – Daniel Herron 11 carries, 60 yards

**Top receivers**

- HOU – DeAndre Hopkins 5 receptions, 77 yards
- IND – T. Y. Hilton 4 receptions, 50 yards

**Top tacklers**

- HOU – Mike Mohamed 4 solo tackles, 8 assists, 2 passes deflected
- IND – D'Qwell Jackson 6 solo tackles, 4 assists

The Texans came into Lucas Oil looking to make history by beating the Colts for the first time on their home field. The Texans scored first after K. Lewis intercepted a pass to return it 27 yards for a touchdown. The Colts scored 14 unanswered points in the 2nd quarter to give them a halftime lead of 14–7. Ryan Fitzpatrick was injured in the 3rd quarter, with 3rd string quarterback Tom Savage stepping in for what would be his first NFL game. Early in the 4th, the Texans would go for it on 4th and 1, with Foster running 25 yards for a touchdown. However, the play was called back following an offensive holding penalty. Bullock would kick a 53-yard field goal instead to trail 10–14 with 13:45 left to play. The Colts lead 17–10 with 2:15 left to play following a 29-yard field goal. Houston tried to make a comeback, but Savage's pass was intercepted with 1:34 left. Following the loss, the Texans dropped to 7-7 and the Colts clinched the AFC South title.

==== Week 16: vs. Baltimore Ravens ====
Week Sixteen: Baltimore Ravens at Houston Texans – Game summary

| Quarter | 1 | 2 | 3 | 4 | Total |
|---|---|---|---|---|---|
| Ravens | 0 | 0 | 7 | 6 | **13** |
| **Texans** | 3 | 13 | 3 | 6 | **25** |

at NRG Stadium, Houston, Texas

- Date: December 21
- Game time: 12:00 p.m. CST
- Game weather: Played indoors (retractable roof closed)
- Game attendance: 71,771
- Referee: Walt Coleman
- TV announcers (CBS): Andrew Catalon, Steve Beuerlein, Steve Tasker and Lewis Johnson
- Recap, Gamebook

Game information

**First quarter**

- HOU 10:33 – Randy Bullock 35 yard field goal, HOU 3–0

**Second quarter**

- HOU 14:57 – Randy Bullock 25 yard field goal, HOU 6–0
- HOU 3:54 – Randy Bullock 30 yard field goal, HOU 9–0
- HOU 1:53 - C. J. Fiedorowicz 5 yard pass from Arian Foster (Randy Bullock kick), HOU 16–0

**Third quarter**

- BAL 11:10 – Torrey Smith 8 yard pass from Joe Flacco (Justin Tucker kick), HOU 16–7
- HOU 8:05 – Randy Bullock 20 yard field goal, HOU 19–7

**Fourth quarter**

- HOU 14:50 – Randy Bullock 39 yard field goal, HOU 22–7
- HOU 9:55 - Randy Bullock 33 yard field goal, HOU 25–7
- BAL 5:56 – Torrey Smith 20 yard pass from Joe Flacco, HOU 25–13

**Top passers**

- BAL – Joe Flacco 21/50, 195 yards, 2 TD, 3 INT
- HOU – Case Keenum 20/42, 185 yards, INT

**Top rushers**

- BAL – Justin Forsett 10 carries, 19 yards
- HOU – Arian Foster 25 carries, 96 yards

**Top receivers**

- BAL – Torrey Smith 5 receptions, 59 yards, 2 TD
- HOU – Andre Johnson 6 receptions, 65 yards

**Top tacklers**

- BAL – Daryl Smith 5 solo tackles, 6 assists, 1 pass deflected
- HOU – J. J. Watt 7 solo tackles, 1 assist, 1 sack, 3 tackles for a loss, 4 QB hits

With their loss against the Colts mathematically eliminating the Texans from the AFC South title, the Texans returned home in hopes of securing a wild card spot in the playoffs. In his first career start since the 2013 season, Case Keenum started as the team's 4th quarterback of the season. Despite driving into the redzone on their first possession, the Texans instead settled on a field goal for an early 3–0 lead. Houston kicked two more field goals before scoring a touchdown (thrown by Arian Foster) to take a halftime lead of 16–0. The Texans held on to win 25–13, keeping their playoff hopes alive.

Game notes

Andre Johnson had six receptions for 65 yards in the game and became the 10th player in NFL history to reach 1,000 career receptions (1,002). Johnson passed Hines Ward for ninth-most in NFL history. Kicker Randy Bullock was 6/6 on field goals during the game, for a total of 19 points.

==== Week 17: vs. Jacksonville Jaguars ====
Week Seventeen: Jacksonville Jaguars at Houston Texans – Game summary

| Quarter | 1 | 2 | 3 | 4 | Total |
|---|---|---|---|---|---|
| Jaguars | 10 | 0 | 7 | 0 | **17** |
| **Texans** | 7 | 7 | 0 | 9 | **23** |

at NRG Stadium, Houston, Texas

- Date: December 28
- Game time: 12:00 p.m. CST
- Game weather: Played indoors (retractable roof closed)
- Game attendance: 71,777
- Referee: John Parry
- TV announcers (Fox): Chris Myers, Ronde Barber and Jennifer Hale
- Recap, Gamebook

Game information

**First quarter**

- HOU – Arian Foster 10-yard pass from Case Keenum (Randy Bullock kick), 10:23. Texans 7–0. **Drive: 5 plays, 83 yards, 2:30.**
- JAX – Josh Scobee 53-yard field goal, 6:02. Texans 7–3. **Drive: 8 plays, 45 yards, 4:21.**
- JAX – Dwayne Gratz 55-yard interception return (Josh Scobee kick), 2:55. Jaguars 10–7.

**Second quarter**

- HOU – Alfred Blue 1-yard run (Randy Bullock kick), 6:34. Texans 14–10. **Drive: 14 plays, 74 yards, 6:45.**

**Third quarter**

- JAX – Jordan Todman 23-yard pass from Cecil Shorts (Josh Scobee kick), 4:45. Jaguars 17–14. **Drive: 1 play, 23 yards, 0:07.**

**Fourth quarter**

- HOU – Andre Johnson 8-yard pass from Case Keenum (Randy Bullock kick), 13:34. Texans 21–17. **Drive: 12 plays, 80 yards, 6:11.**
- HOU – Blake Bortles sacked in end zone by J. J. Watt, 5:37. Texans 23–17.

**Top passers**

- JAX – Blake Bortles – 14/33, 117 yards
- HOU – Case Keenum – 25/35, 250 yards, 2 TD, INT

**Top rushers**

- JAX – Blake Bortles – 3 rushes, 61 yards
- HOU – Jonathan Grimes – 11 rushes, 45 yards

**Top receivers**

- JAX – Cecil Shorts – 5 receptions, 47 yards
- HOU – Andre Johnson – 10 receptions, 134 yards, TD

Notably, J. J. Watt becomes the first NFL player to have 2 20-sack seasons, sacking Blake Bortles in the end zone for his first career safety. With the win, despite being eliminated from the playoffs with the Ravens win over the Browns, the Texans finished the season with the largest win increase of 2014 (+7), with a record of 9–7.

== Standings ==
=== Division ===
AFC South
| | W | L | T | PCT | DIV | CONF | PF | PA | STK |
|---|---|---|---|---|---|---|---|---|---|
| ^{(4)} Indianapolis Colts | 11 | 5 | 0 | .688 | 6–0 | 9–3 | 458 | 369 | W1 |
| Houston Texans | 9 | 7 | 0 | .563 | 4–2 | 8–4 | 372 | 307 | W2 |
| Jacksonville Jaguars | 3 | 13 | 0 | .188 | 1–5 | 2–10 | 249 | 412 | L1 |
| Tennessee Titans | 2 | 14 | 0 | .125 | 1–5 | 2–10 | 254 | 438 | L10 |

=== Conference ===
AFC
| # | Team | Division | W | L | T | PCT | DIV | CONF | SOS | SOV | STK |
|---|---|---|---|---|---|---|---|---|---|---|---|
Division leaders
| 1 (Note: New England defeated Denver head-to-head (Week 9, 43–21).) | New England Patriots | East | 12 | 4 | 0 | .750 | 4–2 | 9–3 | .514 | .487 | L1 |
| 2 | Denver Broncos | West | 12 | 4 | 0 | .750 | 6–0 | 10–2 | .521 | .484 | W1 |
| 3 (Note: Pittsburgh defeated Indianapolis head-to-head (Week 8, 51–34).) | Pittsburgh Steelers | North | 11 | 5 | 0 | .688 | 4–2 | 9–3 | .451 | .486 | W4 |
| 4 | Indianapolis Colts | South | 11 | 5 | 0 | .688 | 6–0 | 9–3 | .479 | .372 | W1 |
Wild Cards
| 5 | Cincinnati Bengals | North | 10 | 5 | 1 | .656 | 3–3 | 7–5 | .498 | .425 | L1 |
| 6 | Baltimore Ravens | North | 10 | 6 | 0 | .625 | 3–3 | 6–6 | .475 | .378 | W1 |
Did not qualify for the postseason
| 7 (Note: Kansas City finished ahead of San Diego in the AFC West based on head-to-head sweep (Week 7, 23–20; Week 17, 19–7). Houston finished ahead of Kansas City and Buffalo based on conference record. Kansas City finished ahead of Buffalo based on head-to-head victory (Week 10, 17–13). San Diego finished ahead of Buffalo based on head-to-head victory (Week 3, 22–10).) | Houston Texans | South | 9 | 7 | 0 | .563 | 4–2 | 8–4 | .447 | .299 | W2 |
| 8 | Kansas City Chiefs | West | 9 | 7 | 0 | .563 | 3–3 | 7–5 | .512 | .500 | W1 |
| 9 | San Diego Chargers | West | 9 | 7 | 0 | .563 | 2–4 | 6–6 | .512 | .403 | L1 |
| 10 | Buffalo Bills | East | 9 | 7 | 0 | .563 | 4–2 | 5–7 | .516 | .486 | W1 |
| 11 | Miami Dolphins | East | 8 | 8 | 0 | .500 | 3–3 | 6–6 | .512 | .406 | L1 |
| 12 | Cleveland Browns | North | 7 | 9 | 0 | .438 | 2–4 | 4–8 | .479 | .371 | L5 |
| 13 | New York Jets | East | 4 | 12 | 0 | .250 | 1–5 | 4–8 | .543 | .375 | W1 |
| 14 (Note: Jacksonville finished ahead of Oakland based on record vs. common opponents (1–4 to 0–5).) | Jacksonville Jaguars | South | 3 | 13 | 0 | .188 | 1–5 | 2–10 | .514 | .313 | L1 |
| 15 | Oakland Raiders | West | 3 | 13 | 0 | .188 | 1–5 | 2–10 | .570 | .542 | L1 |
| 16 | Tennessee Titans | South | 2 | 14 | 0 | .125 | 1–5 | 2–10 | .506 | .375 | L10 |
Tiebreakers (Note: When breaking ties for three or more teams under the NFL's rules, they are first broken within divisions, then comparing only the highest ranked remaining team from each division.)

== Statistics ==
=== Team ===
| Category | Total yards | Yards per game | NFL rank (out of 32) |
|---|---|---|---|
| Passing offense | 3,352 | 209.5 | 24th |
| Rushing offense | 2,161 | 135.1 | 5th |
| Total offense | 5,513 | 344.6 | 17th |
| Passing defense | 3,890 | 243.1 | 21st |
| Rushing defense | 1,681 | 105.1 | 10th |
| Total defense | 5,571 | 348.2 | 16th |

=== Individual ===
| Category | Player | Total |
Offense
| Passing yards | Ryan Fitzpatrick | 2,483 |
| Passing touchdowns | Ryan Fitzpatrick | 17 |
| Rushing yards | Arian Foster | 1,246 |
| Rushing touchdowns | Arian Foster | 8 |
| Receiving yards | DeAndre Hopkins | 1,210 |
| Receiving touchdowns | DeAndre Hopkins | 6 |
Defense
| Tackles (Solo) | Johnathan Joseph | 70 |
| Sacks | J. J. Watt | 20.5 |
| Interceptions | A. J. Bouye; Kareem Jackson; Jumal Rolle | 3 |
