= Kendrick Lewis =

American football player (born 1988)

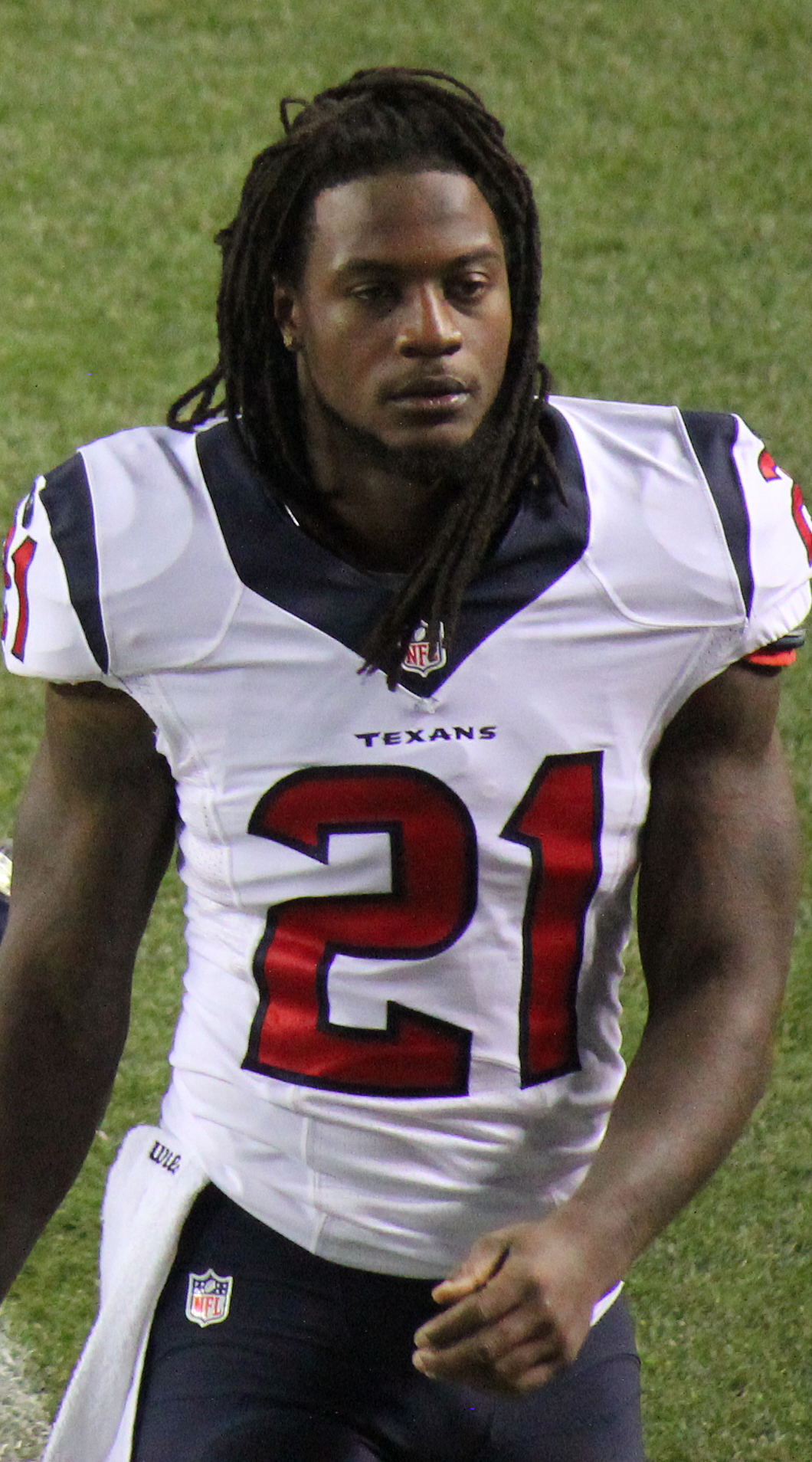
- Lewis with the Houston Texans in 2014

No. 49, 23, 21, 28
- Position: Safety

Personal information
- Born: June 16, 1988 (age 38); New Orleans, Louisiana, U.S.
- Listed height: 6 ft 0 in (1.83 m)
- Listed weight: 205 lb (93 kg)

Career information
- High school: O. Perry Walker (New Orleans)
- College: Ole Miss
- NFL draft: 2010: 5th round, 136th overall pick

Career history
- Kansas City Chiefs (2010–2013); Houston Texans (2014); Baltimore Ravens (2015–2016); Tennessee Titans (2018)

Career NFL statistics
- Total tackles: 349
- Forced fumbles: 8
- Fumble recoveries: 2
- Pass deflections: 34
- Interceptions: 9
- Defensive touchdowns: 2
- Stats at Pro Football Reference

Kendrick Lewis (born June 16, 1988) is an American former professional football player who was a safety in the National Football League (NFL). He played college football for the Ole Miss Rebels and was selected by the Kansas City Chiefs in the fifth round of the 2010 NFL draft. Lewis also played for the Houston Texans, Baltimore Ravens, and Tennessee Titans.

== Professional career ==
=== Kansas City Chiefs ===
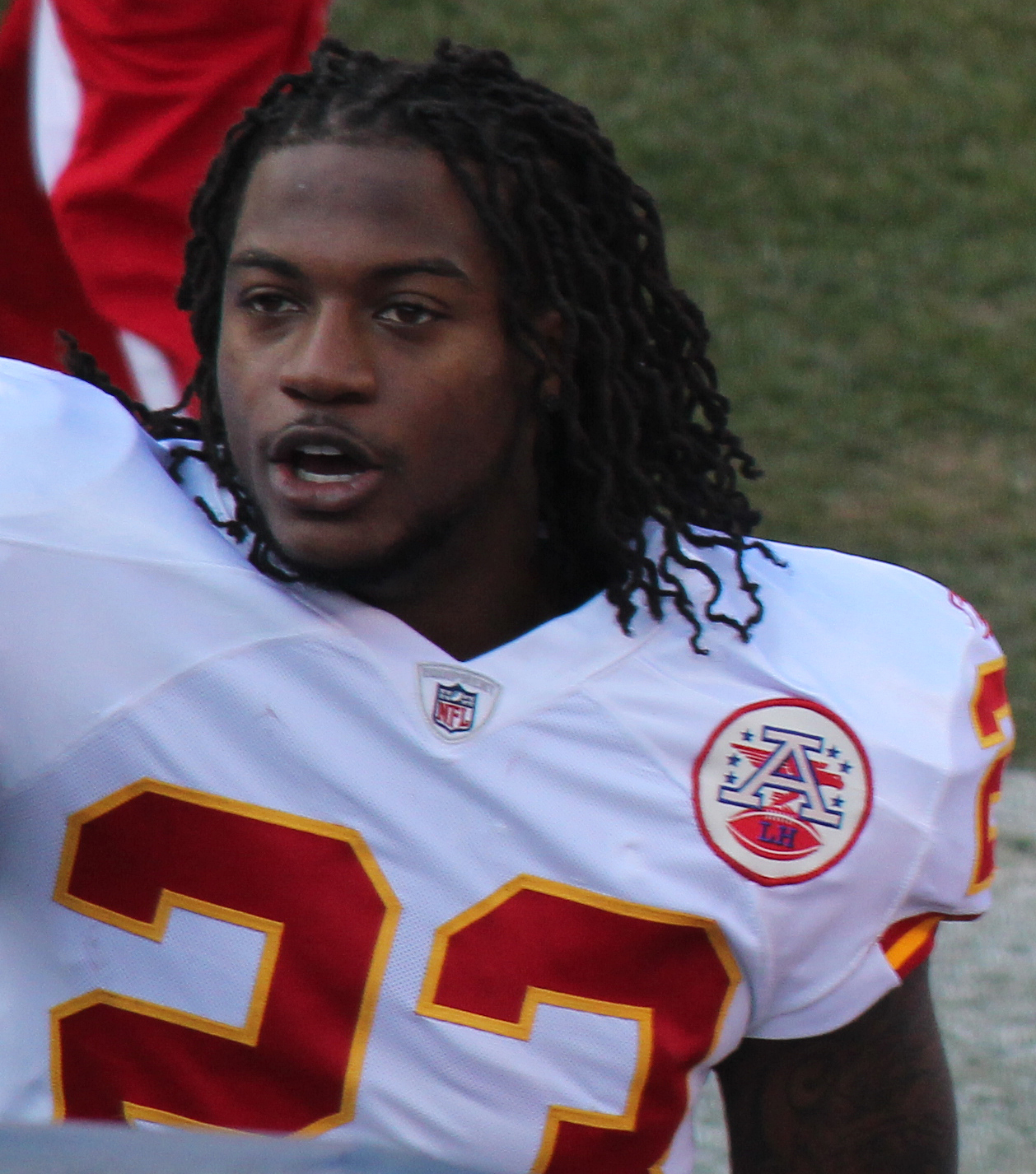
Lewis in 2011

Lewis was selected by the Kansas City Chiefs in the fifth round (136th overall) of the 2010 NFL draft. The Chiefs officially signed him on June 29, 2010.

Lewis began his rookie season as the backup free safety behind Jon McGraw but took over the starting position after McGraw became injured. He started 10 games, intercepting three passes, and forcing one fumble.

In 2011, Lewis started all 16 games at safety for the first time in his career and produced 58 tackles, a career-high 10 passes defensed, and three interceptions.

=== Houston Texans ===
On March 21, 2014, Lewis signed with the Houston Texans. He established a career-high and led the Texans with 84 tackles and three forced fumbles. Lewis also notched two interceptions, six passes defensed and a fumble recovery.

=== Baltimore Ravens ===
On March 14, 2015, Lewis signed a three-year contract with the Baltimore Ravens. He was placed on injured reserve on October 22, 2016.

On March 7, 2017, Lewis was released by the Ravens.

=== Tennessee Titans ===
On May 2, 2018, Lewis signed with the Tennessee Titans after sitting out the entire 2017 season. Lewis played in 13 games while starting three. He finished the 2018 season with 27 tackles and one pass deflection.

== NFL career statistics ==
Legend
**Bold**	Career high

=== Regular season ===
Year	Team	Games		Tackles					Interceptions					Fumbles			
Year	Team	GP	GS	Cmb	Solo	Ast	Sck	TFL	Int	Yds	TD	Lng	PD	FF	FR	Yds	TD
2010	KAN	12	10	29	21	8	0.0	0	**3**	46	0	23	7	2	0	0	0
2011	KAN	**16**	**16**	60	48	12	0.0	0	**3**	**119**	**1**	**59**	**10**	1	**1**	0	0
2012	KAN	9	9	26	24	2	0.0	0	0	0	0	0	1	0	0	0	0
2013	KAN	**16**	15	56	46	10	0.0	3	1	1	0	1	4	0	0	0	0
2014	HOU	**16**	**16**	**84**	**52**	**32**	0.0	4	2	32	**1**	27	6	**3**	**1**	0	0
2015	BAL	15	15	61	38	23	0.0	**5**	0	0	0	0	5	1	0	0	0
2016	BAL	6	0	6	6	0	0.0	0	0	0	0	0	0	1	0	0	0
2018	TEN	13	3	27	20	7	0.0	1	0	0	0	0	1	0	0	0	0
Career		103	84	349	255	94	0.0	13	9	198	2	59	34	8	2	0	0

=== Postseason ===
Year	Team	Games		Tackles					Interceptions					Fumbles			
Year	Team	GP	GS	Cmb	Solo	Ast	Sck	TFL	Int	Yds	TD	Lng	PD	FF	FR	Yds	TD
2010	KAN	**1**	**1**	3	**3**	0	0.0	0	0	0	0	0	0	0	0	0	0
2013	KAN	**1**	**1**	**5**	**3**	**2**	0.0	0	0	0	0	0	**1**	0	0	0	0
Career		2	2	8	6	2	0.0	0	0	0	0	0	1	0	0	0	0
