= NFL Top 100 Players of 2017 =

- Season 2017
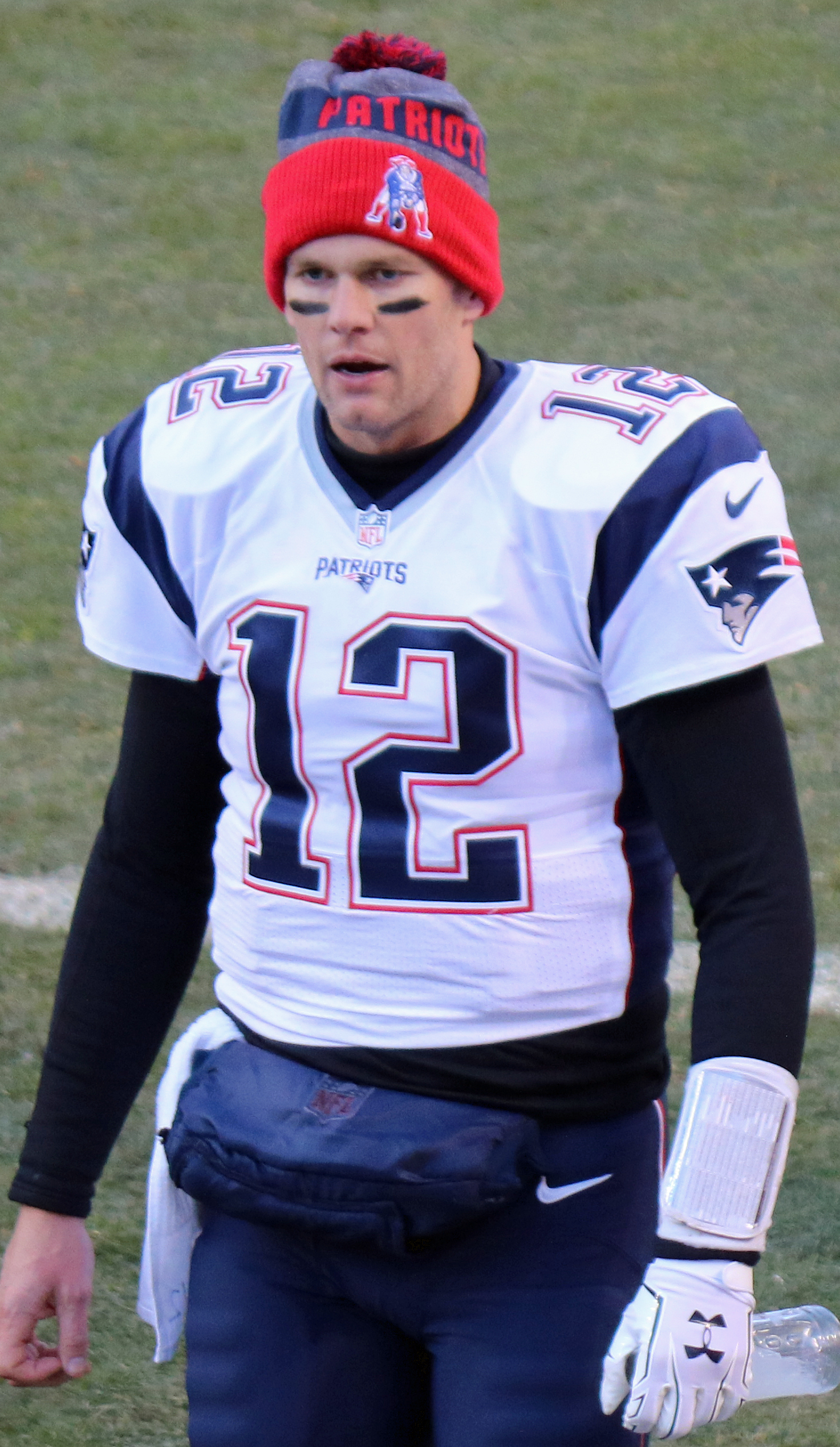
- Tom Brady, the #1 ranked player

Release
- Original network: NFL Network
- Original release: May 1 – June 26, 2017

Season chronology
- ← Previous; 2016 Next → 2018

The NFL Top 100 Players of 2017 was the seventh season in the NFL Top 100 series. It ended with reigning Super Bowl MVP Tom Brady being ranked #1. This made Brady the first player to be voted #1 more than once. It was also just the second time the #1 ranked player was not the reigning NFL MVP of the league, as Matt Ryan came in at #10.

Of the 32 NFL teams, only 3 did not have players that made the list; The Chicago Bears, New York Jets, and San Francisco 49ers.

== Episode list ==
Episode No.	Air date	Numbers revealed
1	May 1	100–91
2	May 1	90–81
3	May 8	80–71
4	May 15	70–61
5	May 22	60–51
6	May 29	50–41
7	June 5	40–31
8	June 12	30–21
9	June 19	20–11
10	June 26	10–6
11	June 26	5–1
	June 26	101–110

== The list ==
Rank	Player	Position	2016 team	2017 team	Rank change	Reference	Year accomplishments
1	Tom Brady	Quarterback	New England Patriots		▲1	1	12th Pro Bowl selection; 2nd-Team AP All-Pro; Super Bowl LI MVP; Won 5th Super Bowl
2	Von Miller	Linebacker	Denver Broncos		▲13	2	5th Pro Bowl selection; 1st-Team AP All-Pro
3	Julio Jones	Wide receiver	Atlanta Falcons		▲5	3	4th Pro Bowl selection; 1st-Team AP All-Pro
4	Antonio Brown	Wide receiver	Pittsburgh Steelers		0	4	5th Pro Bowl selection; 1st-Team AP All-Pro
5	Khalil Mack	Defensive end	Oakland Raiders		▲8	5	2nd Pro Bowl selection; 1st-Team AP All-Pro; AP DPOY
6	Aaron Rodgers	Quarterback	Green Bay Packers		0	6	6th Pro Bowl selection; Passing touchdowns leader
7	Ezekiel Elliott	Running back	Dallas Cowboys		NR	7	4th overall pick in the 2016 NFL draft; 1st Pro Bowl selection; 1st-Team AP All-Pro; Rushing yards leader; Highest ever ranking by a rookie
8	Odell Beckham Jr.	Wide receiver	New York Giants		▲2	8	3rd Pro Bowl selection; 2nd-Team AP All-Pro
9	Le'Veon Bell	Running back	Pittsburgh Steelers		▲32	9	2nd Pro Bowl selection; 2nd-Team AP All-Pro
10	Matt Ryan	Quarterback	Atlanta Falcons		NR	10	4th Pro Bowl selection; 1st-Team AP All-Pro; Passer rating leader; AP OPOY; AP MVP; Led the Atlanta Falcons to the franchise's 2nd Super Bowl appearance
11	Derek Carr	Quarterback	Oakland Raiders		▲89	11	2nd Pro Bowl selection
12	David Johnson	Running back	Arizona Cardinals		NR	12	1st Pro Bowl selection; 1st-Team AP All-Pro (Flex); 2nd-Team AP All-Pro (RB)
13	Eric Berry	Safety	Kansas City Chiefs		▲42	13	5th Pro Bowl selection; 1st-Team AP All-Pro
14	Dak Prescott	Quarterback	Dallas Cowboys		NR	14	135th overall pick in the 2016 NFL draft; 1st Pro Bowl selection; AP OROY
15	Aaron Donald	Defensive tackle	Los Angeles Rams		▼1	15	3rd Pro Bowl selection; 1st-Team AP All-Pro
16	Drew Brees	Quarterback	New Orleans Saints		▲14	16	10th Pro Bowl selection; Passing yards leader
17	A.J. Green	Wide receiver	Cincinnati Bengals		▼1	17	6th Pro Bowl selection
18	Tyron Smith	Offensive tackle	Dallas Cowboys		▲24	18	4th Pro Bowl selection; 1st-Team AP All-Pro
19	Patrick Peterson	Cornerback	Arizona Cardinals		▼1	19	6th Pro Bowl selection
20	Luke Kuechly	Linebacker	Carolina Panthers		▼13	20	4th Pro Bowl selection; 2nd-Team AP All-Pro
21	Richard Sherman	Cornerback	Seattle Seahawks		▼1	21	4th Pro Bowl selection
22	Ben Roethlisberger	Quarterback	Pittsburgh Steelers		▼1	22	5th Pro Bowl selection
23	Rob Gronkowski	Tight end	New England Patriots		▼14	23	Super Bowl champion (2nd time)
24	Russell Wilson	Quarterback	Seattle Seahawks		▼7	24	
25	Joe Thomas	Offensive tackle	Cleveland Browns		▼2	25	10th Pro Bowl selection; 1st-Team AP All-Pro
26	Travis Kelce	Tight end	Kansas City Chiefs		▲65	26	2nd Pro Bowl selection; 1st-Team AP All-Pro
27	LeSean McCoy	Running back	Buffalo Bills		▲42	27	5th Pro Bowl selection
28	Landon Collins	Safety	New York Giants		NR	28	1st Pro Bowl selection; 1st-Team AP All-Pro
29	Mike Evans	Wide receiver	Tampa Bay Buccaneers		NR	29	1st Pro Bowl selection; 2nd-Team AP All-Pro
30	Earl Thomas	Safety	Seattle Seahawks		▲36	30	
31	Matthew Stafford	Quarterback	Detroit Lions		NR	31	
32	Marcus Peters	Cornerback	Kansas City Chiefs		▲33	32	2nd Pro Bowl selection; 1st-Team AP All-Pro
33	DeMarco Murray	Running back	Tennessee Titans		NR	33	3rd Pro Bowl selection
34	Kam Chancellor	Safety	Seattle Seahawks		▼2	34	
35	J.J. Watt	Defensive end	Houston Texans		▼32	35	
36	Tyreek Hill	Wide receiver	Kansas City Chiefs		NR	36	165th overall pick in the 2016 NFL draft; 1st Pro Bowl selection; 1st-Team AP All-Pro
37	Aqib Talib	Cornerback	Denver Broncos		▼3	37	4th Pro Bowl selection; 1st-Team AP All-Pro
38	Fletcher Cox	Defensive tackle	Philadelphia Eagles		▲11	38	2nd Pro Bowl selection
39	Bobby Wagner	Linebacker	Seattle Seahawks		NR	39	3rd Pro Bowl selection; 1st-Team AP All-Pro; Tackles leader
40	Vic Beasley	Linebacker	Atlanta Falcons		NR	40	1st Pro Bowl selection; 1st-Team AP All-Pro; Sacks leader
41	Devonta Freeman	Running back	Atlanta Falcons		▲9	41	2nd Pro Bowl selection
42	Jarvis Landry	Wide receiver	Miami Dolphins		▲56	42	2nd Pro Bowl selection
43	Marshal Yanda	Guard	Baltimore Ravens		▼6	43	6th Pro Bowl selection; 2nd-Team AP All-Pro
44	Cam Newton	Quarterback	Carolina Panthers		▼43	44	
45	Larry Fitzgerald	Wide receiver	Arizona Cardinals		▼18	45	10th Pro Bowl selection; Receptions leader; 2016 Walter Payton NFL Man of the Year Award
46	Michael Bennett	Defensive end	Seattle Seahawks		▲13	46	2nd Pro Bowl selection
47	Trent Williams	Offensive tackle	Washington Redskins		▼2	47	5th Pro Bowl selection; 1st-Team AP All-Pro
48	Jordy Nelson	Wide receiver	Green Bay Packers		NR	48	Receiving touchdowns leader; 2016 Comeback Player of the Year Award
49	Jadeveon Clowney	Defensive end	Houston Texans		NR	49	1st Pro Bowl selection; 1st-Team AP All-Pro
50	Marcus Mariota	Quarterback	Tennessee Titans		NR	50	
51	Andrew Luck	Quarterback	Indianapolis Colts		▲41	51	
52	Gerald McCoy	Defensive tackle	Tampa Bay Buccaneers		▲11	52	5th Pro Bowl selection; 2nd-Team AP All-Pro
53	Amari Cooper	Wide receiver	Oakland Raiders		NR	53	2nd Pro Bowl selection
54	Janoris Jenkins	Cornerback	New York Giants		NR	54	1st Pro Bowl selection; 2nd-Team AP All-Pro
55	Ndamukong Suh	Defensive tackle	Miami Dolphins		▼15	55	5th Pro Bowl selection; 2nd-Team AP All-Pro
56	Cliff Avril	Defensive end	Seattle Seahawks		NR	56	1st Pro Bowl selection
57	Jameis Winston	Quarterback	Tampa Bay Buccaneers		NR	57	
58	Zack Martin	Guard	Dallas Cowboys		NR	58	3rd Pro Bowl selection; 1st-Team AP All-Pro
59	Josh Norman	Cornerback	Washington Redskins		▼48	59	
60	Dez Bryant	Wide receiver	Dallas Cowboys		▼9	60	3rd Pro Bowl selection
61	T.Y. Hilton	Wide receiver	Indianapolis Colts		NR	61	3rd Pro Bowl selection; Receiving yards leader
62	Cameron Wake	Defensive end	Miami Dolphins		NR	62	5th Pro Bowl selection; 2nd-Team AP All-Pro
63	Chris Harris Jr.	Cornerback	Denver Broncos		▼11	63	3rd Pro Bowl selection; 1st-Team AP All-Pro
64	Casey Hayward	Cornerback	San Diego / Los Angeles Chargers		NR	64	1st Pro Bowl selection; 2nd-Team AP All-Pro; Interceptions leader
65	Jordan Reed	Tight end	Washington Redskins		▲12	65	1st Pro Bowl selection
66	Xavier Rhodes	Cornerback	Minnesota Vikings		NR	66	1st Pro Bowl selection
67	Greg Olsen	Tight end	Carolina Panthers		▼29	67	3rd Pro Bowl selection; 2nd-Team AP All-Pro
68	Geno Atkins	Defensive tackle	Cincinnati Bengals		▼39	68	5th Pro Bowl selection; 1st-Team AP All-Pro
69	Jay Ajayi	Running back	Miami Dolphins		NR	69	1st Pro Bowl selection
70	Kirk Cousins	Quarterback	Washington Redskins		▲15	70	1st Pro Bowl selection
71	Julian Edelman	Wide receiver	New England Patriots		▲16	71	Super Bowl champion (2nd time)
72	Taylor Lewan	Offensive tackle	Tennessee Titans		NR	72	1st Pro Bowl selection
73	Philip Rivers	Quarterback	San Diego / Los Angeles Chargers		▼27	73	6th Pro Bowl selection
74	Harrison Smith	Safety	Minnesota Vikings		▼1	74	2nd Pro Bowl selection
75	Delanie Walker	Tight end	Tennessee Titans		▲7	75	2nd Pro Bowl selection
76	Justin Houston	Linebacker	Kansas City Chiefs		▼50	76	
77	Ha Ha Clinton-Dix	Safety	Green Bay Packers		NR	77	1st Pro Bowl selection; 2nd-Team AP All-Pro
78	Brian Orakpo	Linebacker	Tennessee Titans		NR	78	4th Pro Bowl selection
79	Sean Lee	Linebacker	Dallas Cowboys		NR	79	2nd Pro Bowl selection; 1st-Team AP All-Pro
80	LeGarrette Blount	Running back	New England Patriots	Philadelphia Eagles	NR	80	Rushing touchdowns leader; Super Bowl champion (2nd time)
81	Alex Smith	Quarterback	Kansas City Chiefs		0	81	2nd Pro Bowl selection
82	Clay Matthews	Linebacker	Green Bay Packers		▼25	82	
83	Calais Campbell	Defensive end	Arizona Cardinals	Jacksonville Jaguars	▼12	83	2nd-Team AP All-Pro
84	Mike Daniels	Defensive tackle	Green Bay Packers		▲11	84	
85	Chandler Jones	Linebacker	Arizona Cardinals		▼37	85	
86	Jurrell Casey	Defensive tackle	Tennessee Titans		NR	86	2nd Pro Bowl selection
87	Travis Frederick	Center	Dallas Cowboys		NR	87	3rd Pro Bowl selection; 1st-Team AP All-Pro
88	Doug Baldwin	Wide receiver	Seattle Seahawks		▼16	88	1st Pro Bowl selection
89	Thomas Davis	Linebacker	Carolina Panthers		▼35	89	2nd Pro Bowl selection
90	Malcolm Jenkins	Safety	Philadelphia Eagles		NR	90	No. 107 in the 2016 chart
91	Lorenzo Alexander	Linebacker	Buffalo Bills		NR	91	2nd Pro Bowl selection; 2nd-Team AP All-Pro
92	Everson Griffen	Defensive end	Minnesota Vikings		NR	92	2nd Pro Bowl selection
93	Brandon Graham	Defensive end	Philadelphia Eagles		NR	93	2nd-Team AP All-Pro
94	Dont'a Hightower	Linebacker	New England Patriots		NR	94	1st Pro Bowl selection; 2nd-Team AP All-Pro; Super Bowl champion (2nd time)
95	Kelechi Osemele	Guard	Oakland Raiders		NR	95	1st Pro Bowl selection; 1st-Team AP All-Pro
96	Damon Harrison	Defensive tackle	New York Giants		NR	96	1st-Team AP All-Pro
97	David DeCastro	Guard	Pittsburgh Steelers		NR	97	2nd Pro Bowl selection; 2nd-Team AP All-Pro
98	Adrian Peterson	Running back	Minnesota Vikings	New Orleans Saints/Arizona Cardinals	▼93	98	
99	Malcolm Butler	Cornerback	New England Patriots		NR	99	2nd-Team AP All-Pro; Super Bowl champion (2nd time)
100	Joey Bosa	Defensive end	San Diego / Los Angeles Chargers		NR	100	3rd overall pick in the 2016 NFL draft; AP DROY
