= Michael Bennett (defensive lineman, born 1985) =

American football player (born 1985)

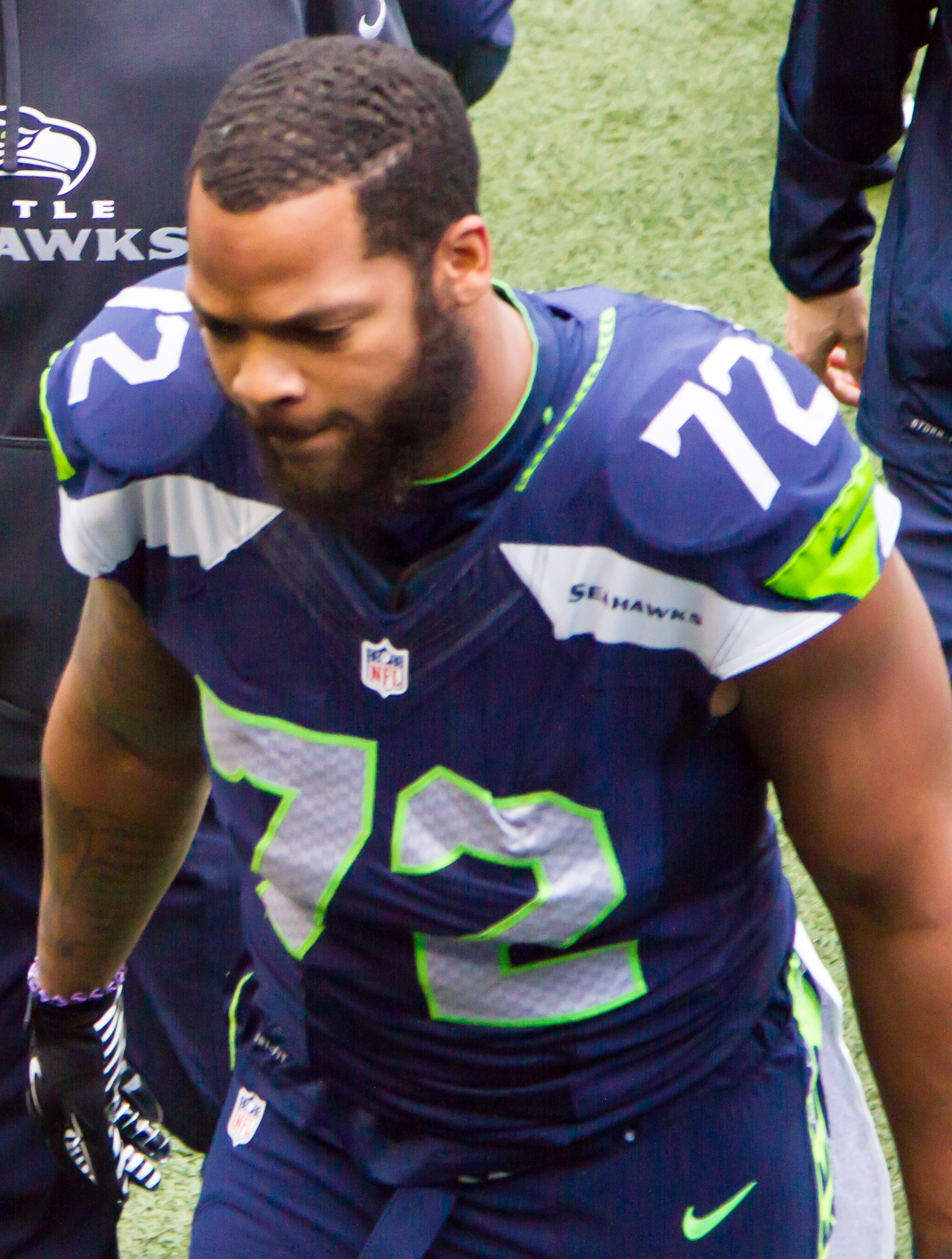
- Bennett with the Seattle Seahawks in 2013

No. 71, 72, 77, 79
- Position: Defensive end

Personal information
- Born: November 13, 1985 (age 41); Independence, Louisiana, U.S.
- Listed height: 6 ft 4 in (1.93 m)
- Listed weight: 274 lb (124 kg)

Career information
- High school: Alief Taylor (Houston, Texas)
- College: Texas A&M (2005–2008)
- NFL draft: 2009: undrafted

Career history
- Seattle Seahawks (2009); Tampa Bay Buccaneers (2009–2012); Seattle Seahawks (2013–2017); Philadelphia Eagles (2018); New England Patriots (2019); Dallas Cowboys (2019)

Awards and highlights
- Super Bowl champion (XLVIII); 3× Pro Bowl (2015–2017); Seattle Seahawks Top 50 players

Career NFL statistics
- Total tackles: 359
- Sacks: 69.5
- Forced fumbles: 10
- Fumble recoveries: 3
- Pass deflections: 5
- Defensive touchdowns: 1
- Stats at Pro Football Reference

Michael Bennett Jr. (born November 13, 1985) is an American former professional football player who was a defensive end in the National Football League (NFL). He played college football for the Texas A&M Aggies, and signed with the Seattle Seahawks as an undrafted free agent in 2009. Bennett also played for the Tampa Bay Buccaneers, Philadelphia Eagles, New England Patriots, and Dallas Cowboys. Over his career Bennett made three Pro Bowls and won Super Bowl XLVIII with the Seahawks. He is the brother of former tight end Martellus Bennett.

== Early life ==
Bennett attended Alief Taylor High School in Houston, Texas, where he played football, baseball, and competed in track. In football, he earned first-team All-District honors as a defensive lineman in his senior year, after compiling 110 tackles and four sacks. He also earned honorable mention All-District honors as a junior. In track & field, Bennett was a standout discus thrower, with a top-throw of 45.72 meters (147 ft). In addition, he also ran a 4.79-second 40-yard dash and jumped 36.5 inches in the vertical jump.

== College career ==
In 2005, as a freshman at Texas A&M, he made 27 tackles, including 3.5 quarterback sacks, while seeing action in all 11 games and starting 4. In 2006, he was the team's top tackler among defenders that did not start a game—he posted 27 tackles, including two sacks and 6 tackles for loss, while seeing action in every game. He also forced a pair of fumbles and batted down a pass. In 2007, he was selected to the honorable mention All-Big 12 Conference team at defensive end after registered 43 tackles including six tackles for a loss of yardage. In 2008, Bennett played in 11 games and made 42 tackles with 12.5 for losses and 2.5 sacks. He also played alongside his brother, Martellus Bennett, from 2006 to 2008 at Texas A&M.

== Professional career ==
Pre-draft measurables
Height	Weight	Arm length	Hand span	40-yard dash	10-yard split	20-yard split	Vertical jump	Broad jump	Bench press
6 ft 3 1/2 in (1.92 m)	274 lb (124 kg)	33 1/2 in (0.85 m)	9 3/4 in (0.25 m)	5.13 s	1.62 s	2.84 s	31.0 in (0.79 m)	9 ft 2 in (2.79 m)	24 reps
All values from NFL Combine

=== Seattle Seahawks (first stint) ===
Bennett was signed as an undrafted free agent by the Seattle Seahawks on April 27, 2009. An NFL Draft analyst noted that Bennett was not drafted probably due to his inconsistent performance in college. The team initially believed he could serve at left defensive end. After working with coaches during training camp, he was moved to the inside as a pass-rushing tackle. During the preseason, he compiled nine tackles, two sacks, five QB hurries, a tipped pass and a fumble recovery. He made the final roster by the end of the preseason.

Bennett was waived by the Seahawks on October 10, 2009 in order to make room for offensive tackle Kyle Williams, who was signed off of the practice squad.

=== Tampa Bay Buccaneers ===
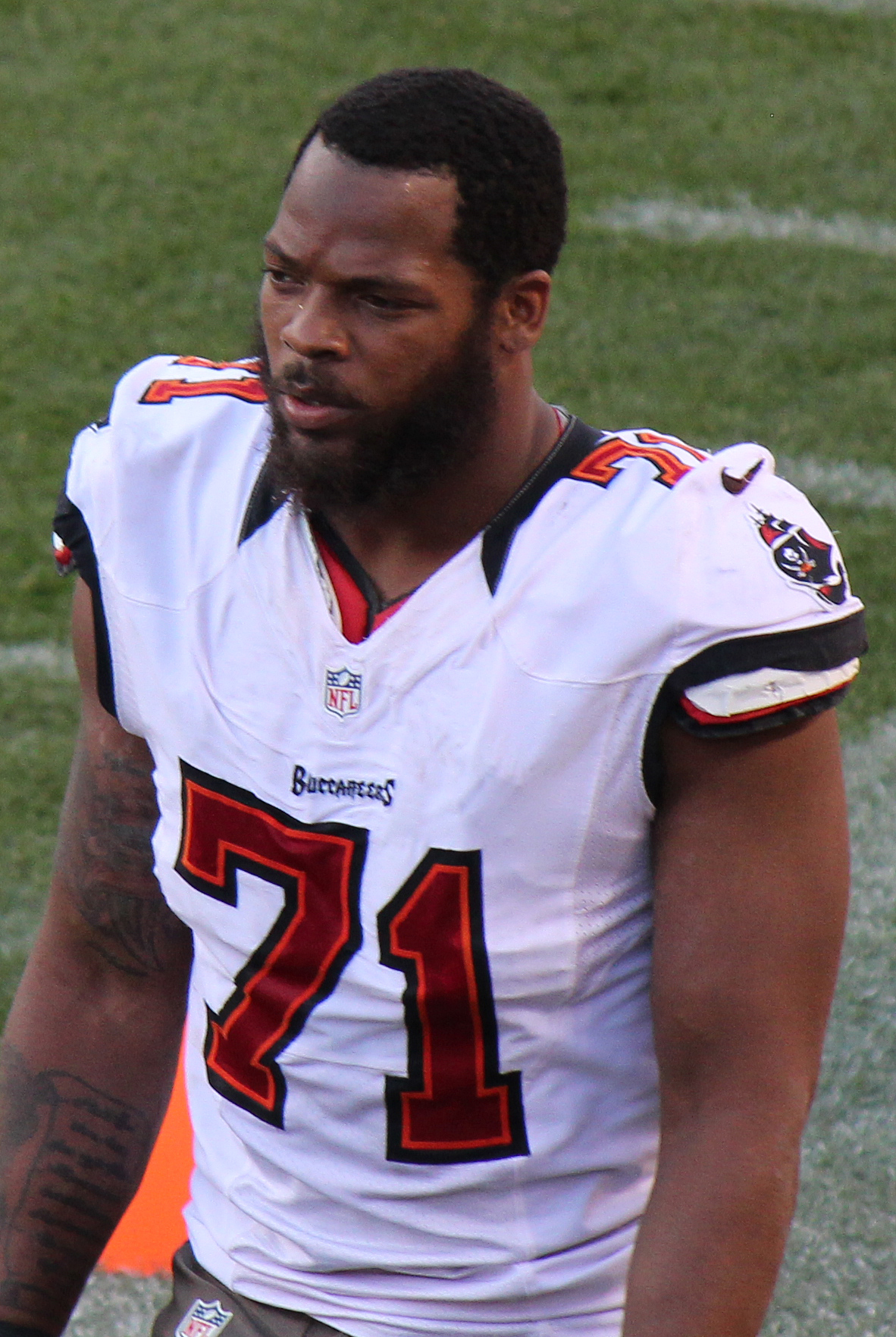
Bennett in 2012 with Tampa Bay

Bennett was claimed off waivers by the Tampa Bay Buccaneers on October 12, 2009. Tampa Bay switched him back to defensive tackle, and he became a key part of the defense filling in for the injured Gerald McCoy.

Bennett's best season as a Buccaneer came in 2012 when he recorded career-highs in tackles (41), sacks (9), and forced fumbles (3).

=== Seattle Seahawks (second stint) ===
Bennett was signed as an unrestricted free agent by the Seahawks on March 14, 2013. He signed a 1-year contract reportedly worth $4.8 million, with $1.5 million guaranteed. On March 24, 2013, ESPN's Adam Schefter reported that Bennett had a torn rotator cuff. On December 2, 2013, Bennett scored his first NFL touchdown against the New Orleans Saints after recovering a fumble from the Saints quarterback Drew Brees. Bennett was a key contributor to the 2013 Seahawks defensive unit that ranked first in the NFL and went on to win Super Bowl XLVIII.

On March 10, 2014, the day before free agency began for the 2014 season, the Seahawks re-signed Bennett to a four-year, $28.5 million contract with $16 million guaranteed. Rumors had previously stated that Michael could be joining his brother Martellus in Chicago.

After the Seattle Seahawks defeated the Green Bay Packers in the NFC Championship game on January 18, 2015, Bennett commandeered a Seattle police officer's bicycle and took a victory lap around Century Link Field.

In Super Bowl XLIX, with 18 seconds left in the end of the game, Bennett committed a neutral zone infraction. Afterward, a brawl ensued, which Bennett took part in. The Seahawks lost to the New England Patriots 24–28.

On October 22 of the 2015 season, in a game against the San Francisco 49ers, Michael Bennett recorded 3.5 sacks of Colin Kaepernick. The Seahawks won the game 20-3, and Bennett was named defensive player of the week for his performance.

Eight games into the 2015 season, Bennett was ranked as the ninth-best edge defender in the NFL by Pro Football Focus. Through those eight games he had 31 total tackles (21 solo), 6.5 sacks, 1 forced fumble, and 8 tackles for loss. He was ranked 59th on the NFL Top 100 Players of 2016.

On December 30, 2016, Bennett signed a three-year $31.5 million contract extension with the Seahawks, with one year still on his previous contract, now keeping Bennett signed through the 2020 season. He was named to his second straight Pro Bowl in 2016, and was ranked 46th by his peers on the NFL Top 100 Players of 2017.

On December 10, 2017, in a game against the Jacksonville Jaguars, Bennett struck the knees of Jaguars center Brandon Linder on a kneel down. This led to an altercation between the two teams, and that resulted in teammates Sheldon Richardson and Quinton Jefferson being ejected from the contest.

On January 22, 2018, Bennett earned his third straight invite to the Pro Bowl after Minnesota Vikings defensive end Everson Griffen could not attend due to injury.

=== Philadelphia Eagles ===
On March 7, 2018, the Seahawks agreed to a trade that would send Bennett and a seventh round pick in the 2018 NFL draft to the Philadelphia Eagles in exchange for wide receiver Marcus Johnson and a fifth round draft pick. The deal became official on March 14, 2018, at the start of the new NFL league year. He played in all 16 games with 10 starts, recording 34 tackles, nine sacks, and two forced fumbles.

=== New England Patriots ===
On March 14, 2019, Bennett and a seventh-round selection in the 2020 NFL draft were traded to the New England Patriots in exchange for a fifth-round 2020 draft selection. In week 2 against the Miami Dolphins, Bennett recorded his first sack of the season in the 43-0 win. On October 15, Bennett was suspended by the Patriots for one game — a Monday Night Football matchup against the New York Jets — for conduct detrimental to the team. Bennett said his suspension was the result of a "philosophical disagreement" with his position coach, and apologized for his conduct. He was reinstated from suspension on October 22, but his return was short-lived as he was traded just days later.

=== Dallas Cowboys ===
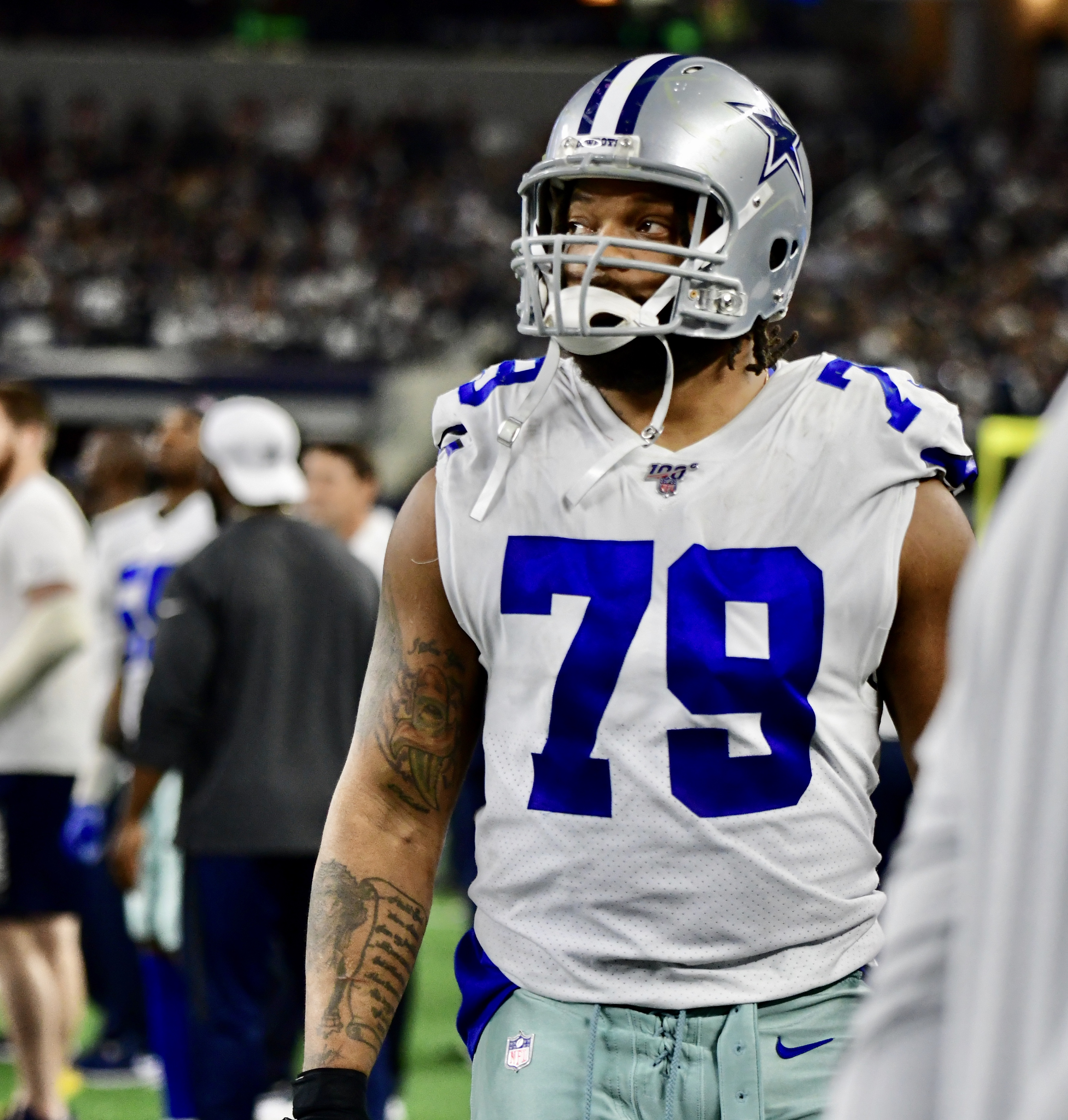
Bennett in a game against the Washington Redskins

On October 24, 2019, Bennett was traded to the Dallas Cowboys in exchange for a conditional 2021 sixth-round selection (#195-Roy Lopez). He was acquired to offset the loss of defensive end Tyrone Crawford, who was placed on the injured reserve list on October 15. He was a backup defensive end, registering 18 tackles (8 for loss), 4 sacks, and 24 quarterback pressures in 9 games. He was not re-signed after the season.

=== Retirement ===
On July 21, 2020, Bennett announced his retirement from the NFL after eleven seasons.

== NFL career statistics ==
Legend
	Won the Super Bowl
**Bold**	Career high

=== Regular season ===
Year	Team	Games		Tackles				Fumbles				Interceptions					
Year	Team	GP	GS	Comb	Solo	Ast	Sck	FF	FR	Yds	TD	Int	Yds	Avg	Lng	TD	PD
2009	SEA	DNP															
2009	TB	7	0	3	2	1	1.0	0	0	0	0	0	0	0.0	0	0	0
2010	TB	13	2	15	13	2	1.0	0	0	0	0	0	0	0.0	0	0	1
2011	TB	14	10	39	**35**	4	4.0	1	**2**	0	0	0	0	0.0	0	0	0
2012	TB	**16**	**16**	41	34	7	9.0	**3**	0	0	0	0	0	0.0	0	0	**2**
2013	SEA	**16**	3	31	18	13	8.5	1	1	**22**	**1**	0	0	0.0	0	0	0
2014	SEA	**16**	**16**	38	26	12	7.0	1	0	0	0	0	0	0.0	0	0	0
2015	SEA	**16**	**16**	**52**	33	**19**	**10.0**	2	0	0	0	0	0	0.0	0	0	0
2016	SEA	11	11	34	24	10	5.0	0	0	0	0	0	0	0.0	0	0	0
2017	SEA	**16**	**16**	40	25	15	8.5	0	0	0	0	0	0	0.0	0	0	1
2018	PHI	**16**	10	34	25	9	9.0	2	0	0	0	0	0	0.0	0	0	1
2019	NE	6	1	5	4	1	2.5	0	0	0	0	0	0	0.0	0	0	0
2019	DAL	9	0	27	20	7	4.0	0	0	0	0	0	0	0.0	0	0	1
Career		156	101	359	259	100	69.5	10	3	22	1	0	0	0.0	0	0	5

== Awards and highlights ==
- Pro Bowl selection (2015, 2016, 2017)
- Super Bowl Champion (XLVIII)
- 2× NFC Champion (2013, 2014)
- Pro Bowl Defensive MVP (2015)
- PFWA All-NFC (2015)
- 3× NFL Top 100 — 90th (2015), 59th (2016), 46th (2017)

== Post-NFL career ==
=== Philanthropy ===
Bennett, together with his wife, Pele, established The Bennett Foundation with the stated mission of promoting health and fitness in underserved communities. The foundation operates out of Washington, Texas, and Hawaii, offering free and accessible education, children's camps and activities, and health screenings. The foundation organizes the yearly O.C.E.A.N. Health Fest has worked to develop in-school nutrition education programs.

=== Mouthpeace ===
In January 2020, Bennett partnered with Lemonada Media to launch Mouthpeace with Michael and Pele, a weekly podcast exploring topics such as family, his career, American society, and culture. Bennett hosts the series alongside his wife, Pele.

The first episode of Mouthpeace was released on January 31, 2020, and subsequent guests have included Dr. John Carlos, Dawan Landry, Dr. Eddie Glaude, Beto O’Rourke, Edouardo Jordan, Laila Ali, and Cliff Avril.

== Personal life ==
Bennett has two sisters: Ashley Bennett and Renekia Leathers; and three brothers: Donte, Martellus, and Reshaud Bennett. Martellus also played in the NFL, a tight end who was drafted in the second round of the 2008 NFL draft by the Dallas Cowboys.

Bennett's sack dance, in which he places his hands on his head and swivels his hips, was modeled after professional wrestler Rick Rude.

Starting in 2017, Bennett began kneeling during the singing of "The Star-Spangled Banner" before games. He said his stance was influenced by the violence at the Unite the Right rally in Charlottesville, Virginia. Bennett declined a trip to Israel with other NFL players in 2017 citing his support for the Palestinian cause.

In the 2016 U.S. Presidential Election, Bennett endorsed Bernie Sanders in the Democratic primary, praising him for his positions on climate control and social justice. In the 2020 election, he again endorsed Sanders.

In August 2020, Bennett, fellow athletes and voting rights activists joined VoteRiders to celebrate the legacy of Rep. John Lewis and mark the 55th anniversary of the Voting Rights Act by helping eligible voters get the ID needed to cast a ballot. Bennett used the #makegoodtrouble hashtag on social media to honor Rep. Lewis.

== Legal issues ==
In August 2017, Bennett was involved in an incident outside a Las Vegas nightclub with two police officers. Bennett claimed that the officers used excessive force on him and stated the police "threatened to blow my head off." The police have denied his accusations, and claim the video evidence does not corroborate Bennett's story. Clark County Sheriff Joe Lombardo said he found no evidence that three officers who encountered Bennett racially profiled him or used excessive force against him. The incident remains under investigation.

On March 23, 2018, a warrant was issued for Bennett's arrest by police in Harris County, Texas for allegedly injuring an elderly paraplegic worker at Super Bowl LI, held 13 months previously. On March 26 Bennett returned to the U.S. from outside the country (where he was when his arrest warrant was issued) and surrendered to police custody. He posted a $10,000 bail bond and was set free. Bennett pleaded not guilty in April. The court date was postponed six times: in April, May, June, August, September, October, and March 2019. On April 3, 2019, criminal charges against Bennett were dropped due to insufficient evidence.

== Bibliography ==
- Things That Make White People Uncomfortable. With Dave Zirin. Foreword by Martellus Bennett. Chicago: Haymarket Books, 2018.
- The Bread of Teaching., 2009
