= Rodney Hudson =

American football player (born 1989)

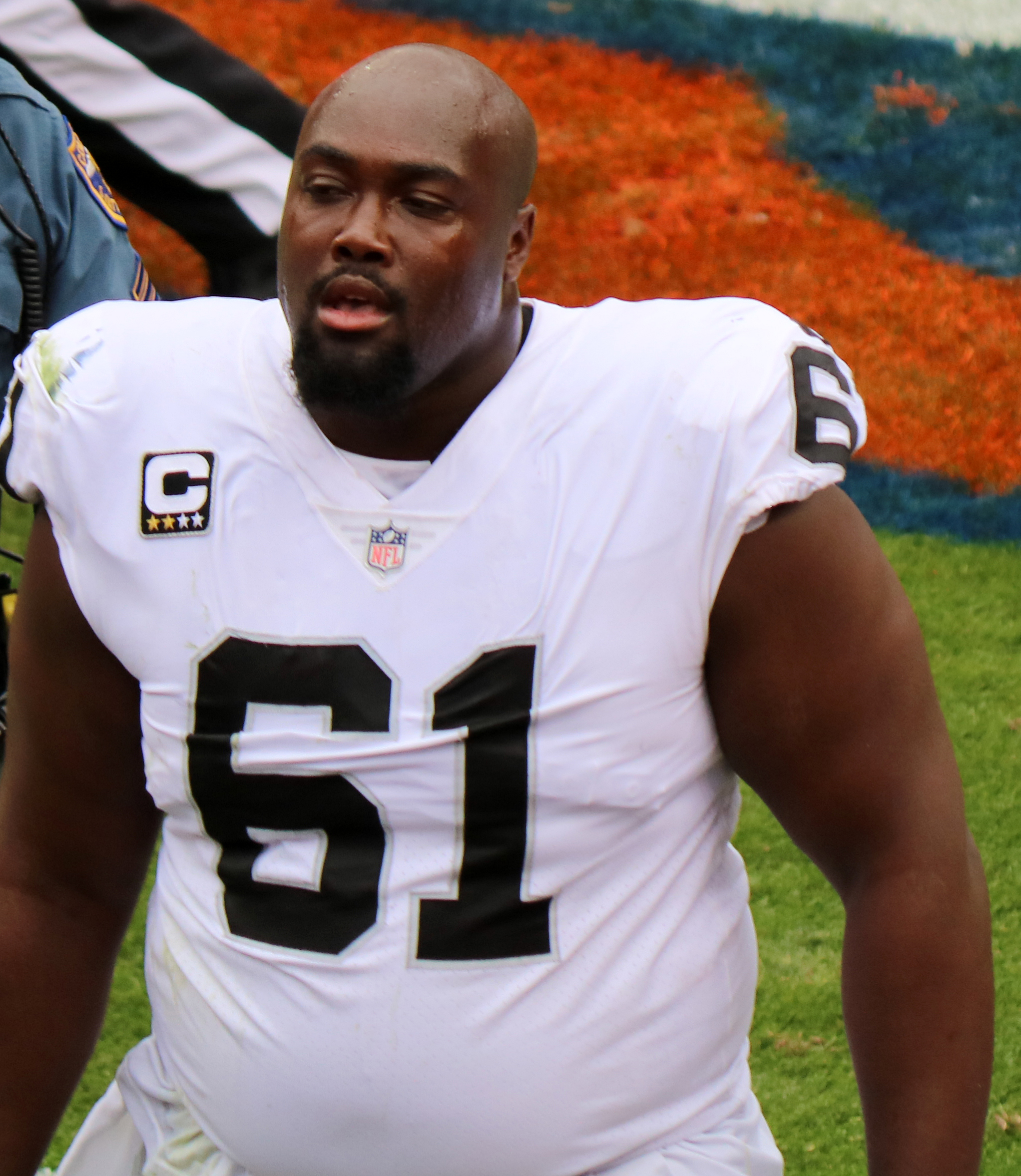
- Hudson with the Oakland Raiders in 2017

Profile
- Position: Center

Personal information
- Born: July 12, 1989 (age 37); Mobile, Alabama, U.S.
- Listed height: 6 ft 2 in (1.88 m)
- Listed weight: 315 lb (143 kg)

Career information
- High school: Rain (Mobile)
- College: Florida State (2007–2010)
- NFL draft: 2011: 2nd round, 55th overall pick

Career history
- Kansas City Chiefs (2011–2014); Oakland / Las Vegas Raiders (2015–2020); Arizona Cardinals (2021–2022)

Awards and highlights
- Second-team All-Pro (2019); 3× Pro Bowl (2016, 2017, 2019); Jacobs Blocking Trophy (2009); Unanimous All-American (2010); First-team All-American (2009); 3× First-team All-ACC (2008–2010); Second-team All-ACC (2007)

Career NFL statistics
- Games played: 159
- Games started: 143
- Stats at Pro Football Reference

William Rodney Hudson (born July 12, 1989) is an American former professional football player who was a center in the National Football League (NFL). He played college football for the Florida State Seminoles, earning All-American honors twice. Hudson was selected by the Kansas City Chiefs in the second round of the 2011 NFL draft. He also played for the Oakland Raiders and Arizona Cardinals.

== Early life ==
Hudson was born in Mobile, Alabama. He attended B. C. Rain High School in Mobile, where he was a two-way lineman for the Raiders high school football team. He graded out at 95 percent for his entire senior season with a total of 47 pancake blocks, while also being a standout on defense as he recorded 55 tackles as defensive tackle. He earned All-State first team honors as a junior and senior.

Besides his football commitments, Hudson was forced to work nights at a local Kentucky Fried Chicken restaurant to support his single mother throughout high school.

Considered a three-star recruit by Rivals.com, Hudson was listed as the No. 17 center in the nation. He also received a three-star rating by Scout.com, and ranked 45th on their offensive guard list. He selected Florida State over West Virginia and Southern Miss, among others.

== College career ==
Hudson attended Florida State University, and played for coach Bobby Bowden and coach Jimbo Fisher's Seminoles teams from 2007 to 2010. As a true freshman in 2007, he started 10 of 13 games at left guard and left tackle. He was named the ACC Offensive Lineman of the Week for his performance in the Seminoles' victory over the second ranked Boston College. At the end of the season, he earned numerous honors such as a Freshman All-American first-team selection by College Football News and the Football Writers Association of America, and All-ACC third-team honors by Phil Steele. As a sophomore in 2008 Hudson earned ACC Offensive Lineman of the Week three times. At the end of the season, he earned a first-team All-ACC selection by Rivals.com and Phil Steele.

In 2009, Hudson was listed at No. 2 on Rivals.com's preseason interior lineman power ranking in 2009. Hudson was the winner of the ACC Jacobs Blocking Award as the league's most dominant offensive lineman. He earned FWAA first-team All-American honors and was an Associated Press second-team All-American.

In the 2010 preseason, Hudson was a watch list candidate for the Lombardi Award and Outland Trophy. In November 2010, he was named one of three finalists for the Outland Trophy, along with Gabe Carimi and Nate Solder; Carimi won the award. Hudson was a first-team All-ACC selection for the third consecutive season, and was recognized as a unanimous first-team All-American.

After four years of starting, Hudson left FSU as the most decorated offensive lineman in Seminole history. Hudson was listed as the 24th best player in FSU history by the Orlando Sentinel before his senior season had even been played.

== Professional career ==
=== Pre-draft ===
Hudson was graded as the sixth best available offensive guard in the 2011 NFL draft and projected to be a second to third round pick by Sports Illustrated. He was projected to be moved to center, due to his "limited size". He was ranked as the best Center and the 52nd overall prospect by NFLDraftScout.com.

Pre-draft measurables
Height	Weight	Arm length	Hand span	Wingspan	40-yard dash	10-yard split	20-yard split	20-yard shuttle	Three-cone drill	Vertical jump	Broad jump	Bench press
6 ft 2 3/8 in (1.89 m)	299 lb (136 kg)	32 1/2 in (0.83 m)	9 3/8 in (0.24 m)	6 ft 4 1/2 in (1.94 m)	5.31 s	1.90 s	3.12 s	4.96 s	8.03 s	25.5 in (0.65 m)	7 ft 11 in (2.41 m)	27 reps
All values from NFL Combine

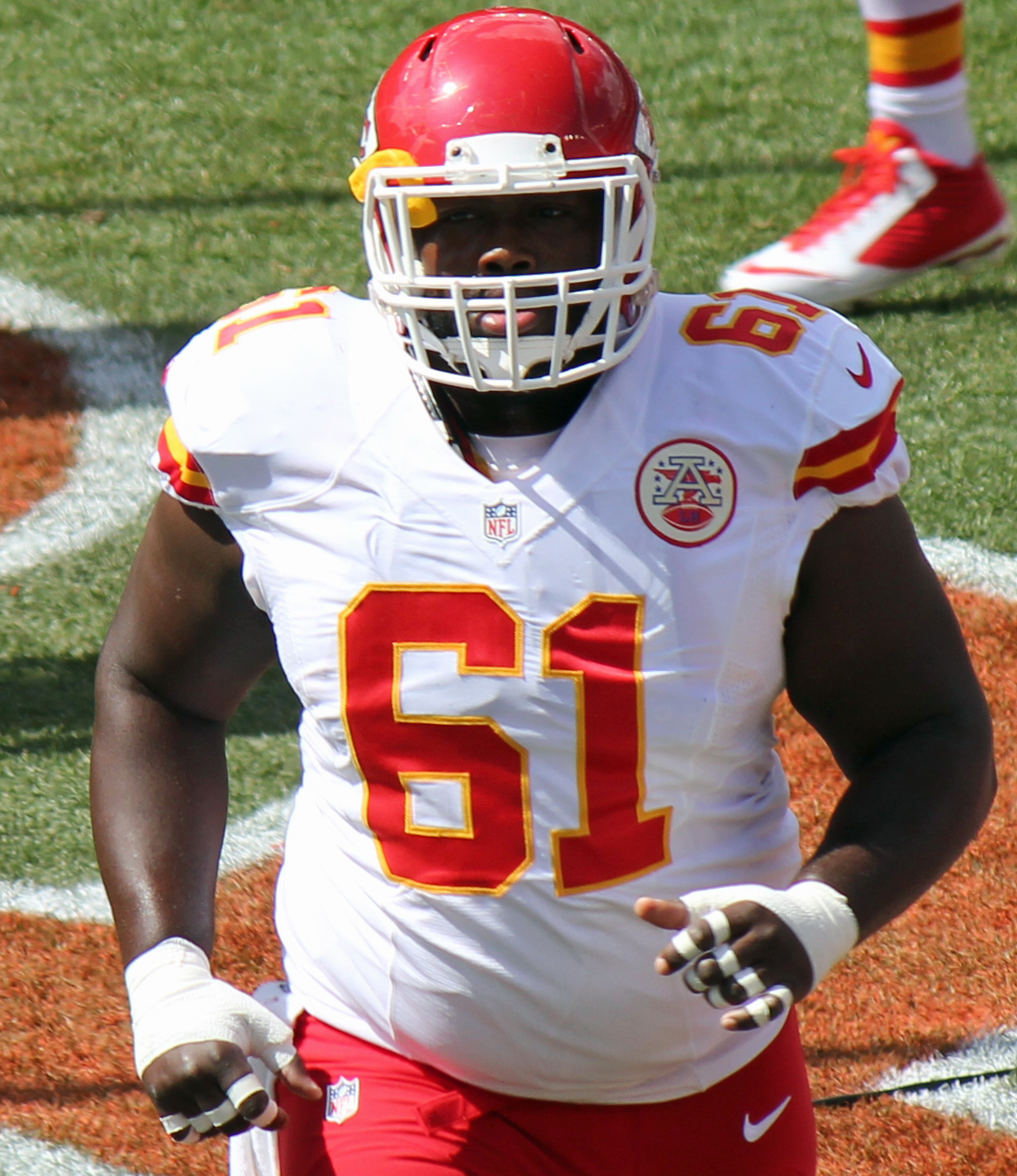
Hudson with the Kansas City Chiefs in 2014

=== Kansas City Chiefs ===
==== 2011 ====
Hudson was selected in the second round, with the 55th overall pick, by the Kansas City Chiefs. He was the highest selected Seminoles offensive lineman since Alex Barron went 19th overall to the St. Louis Rams in 2005. On July 29, 2011, the Kansas City Chiefs signed him to a four-year, $3.50 million contract with a signing bonus of $104,892.

He entered training camp his rookie year competing with veteran Casey Wiegmann for the starting center position. He was named the backup center to Wiegmann to begin the regular season.

He made his regular season debut in the Kansas City Chiefs' season-opening loss to the Buffalo Bills. On November 27, 2011, Hudson earned his first career start during a 13–9 loss to the Pittsburgh Steelers. He finished his rookie season with 16 games and one start as the Kansas City Chiefs finished 7–9 and fired head coach Todd Haley.

==== 2012 ====
Hudson entered training camp in 2012, competing with Rob Bruggeman and Cam Holland to be the Chiefs' starting center. Head coach Romeo Crennel named Hudson the starting center to begin the regular season. On September 23, 2012, Hudson suffered a broken leg during the Chiefs' 27–24 overtime victory against the New Orleans Saints. He was placed on injured-reserve for the remainder of the season three days later and finished his second season with three starts in the first three games.

==== 2013 ====
Hudson returned in time for training camp and competed with Eric Kush and Tommie Draheim to keep his job as the starting center. The Kansas City Chiefs' new head coach, Andy Reid, named him the starting center to begin the regular season. Hudson played in all 16 games and started the first 15, helping the Chiefs achieve an 11–5 record.

On January 4, 2014, he started in his first career playoff game as the Chiefs were defeated by the Indianapolis Colts, 45–44, in the AFC Wildcard Round.

==== 2014 ====
Hudson entered the 2014 regular season as the Kansas City Chiefs' de facto starter at center. He started all 16 regular season games for the first time in his career and became a free agent after the season. Bleacher Report ranked him the fourth-best center of 2014 and Pro Football Focus ranked him the fifth-best center.

=== Oakland / Las Vegas Raiders ===
On March 11, 2015, the Oakland Raiders signed Hudson to a five-year, $44.5 million contract with $20 million guaranteed. He finished his first season with the Raiders giving up only eight pressures and starting 13 games. Hudson missed Weeks 10, 12, and 13 with a sprained right ankle and had Tony Bergstrom fill in. Pro Football Focus ranked him the fifth best center in 2015 and graded him as the best pass blocker at center.

Hudson returned as the Raiders' starting center in 2016, started all 16 regular season games, and was the only player on the team to play every offensive snap. He was selected to his first Pro Bowl along with fellow Raider's offensive linemen Donald Penn and Kelechi Osemele.

On December 19, 2017, Hudson was named to his second Pro Bowl along with fellow Raider offensive linemen Donald Penn and Kelechi Osemele for the second straight year.

On August 30, 2019, Hudson signed a three-year, $33.75 million contract extension with the Raiders, making him the highest-paid center in the NFL.

Hudson was placed on the reserve/COVID-19 list by the team on October 22, 2020, and was activated two days later.

=== Arizona Cardinals ===
Hudson, along with a seventh-round selection in the 2021 NFL draft, was traded to the Arizona Cardinals on March 17, 2021, in exchange for a third-round selection (Malcolm Koonce) in the 2021 NFL Draft. He was named the Cardinals starting center for the 2021 season. He was placed on injured reserve on October 16 with rib and shoulder injuries. He was activated on November 6.

After contemplating retirement in the offseason, Hudson returned as the Cardinals starting center in 2022. He started the first four games, then missed the next five games before being placed on injured reserve on November 12, 2022.

== Legacy ==
In 2025 he was inducted into the Mobile Sports Hall of Fame.
