= Chris Harris Jr. =

American football player (born 1989)

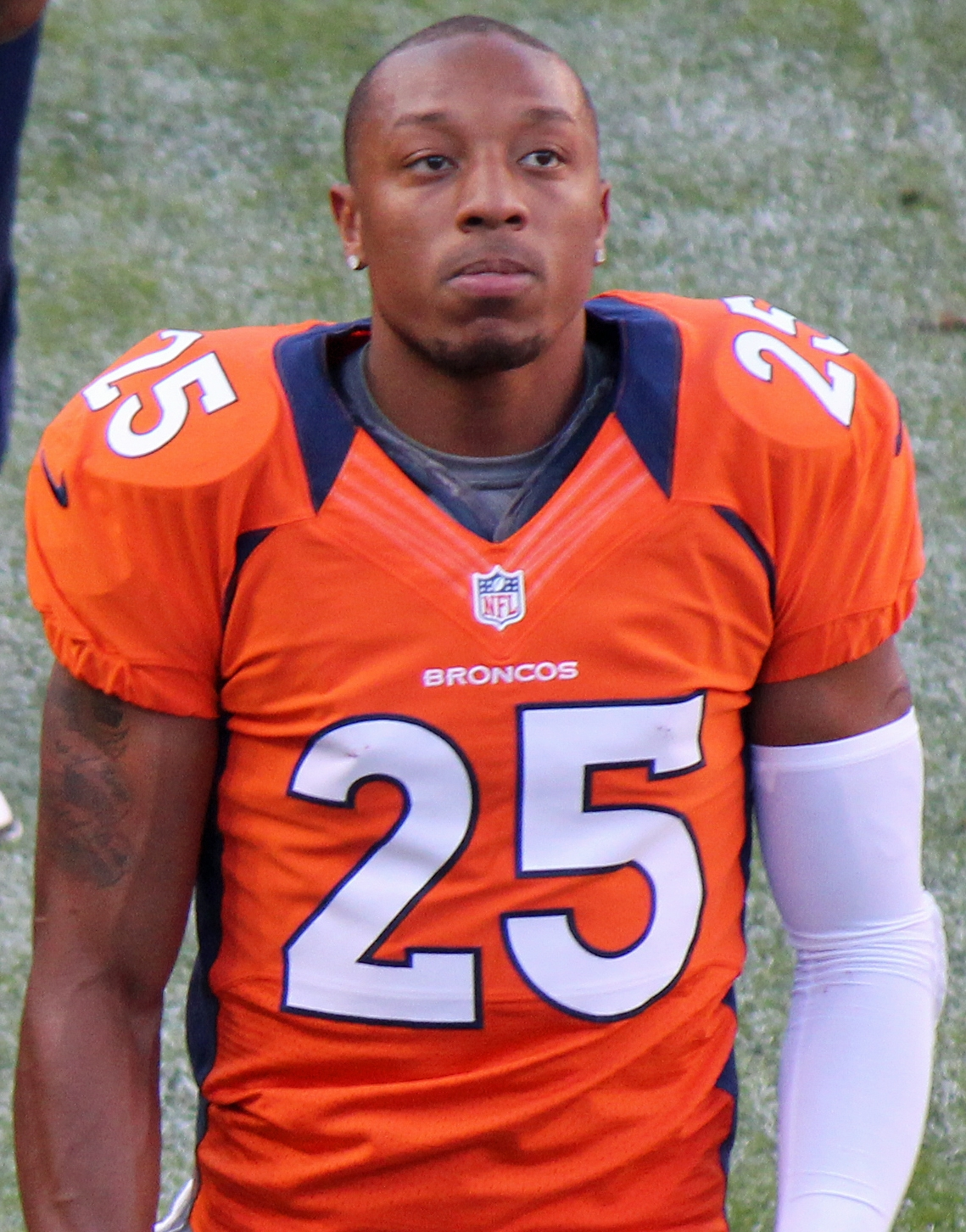
- Harris with the Denver Broncos in 2012

No. 25, 19
- Position: Cornerback

Personal information
- Born: June 18, 1989 (age 37); Tulsa, Oklahoma, U.S.
- Listed height: 5 ft 10 in (1.78 m)
- Listed weight: 199 lb (90 kg)

Career information
- High school: Bixby (Bixby, Oklahoma)
- College: Kansas (2007–2010)
- NFL draft: 2011: undrafted

Career history
- Denver Broncos (2011–2019); Los Angeles Chargers (2020–2021); New Orleans Saints (2022)

Awards and highlights
- Super Bowl champion (50); First-team All-Pro (2016); 2× Second-team All-Pro (2014, 2015); 4× Pro Bowl (2014–2016, 2018); PFWA All-Rookie Team (2011); NFL 2010s All-Decade Team

Career NFL statistics
- Total tackles: 621
- Sacks: 6.0
- Pass deflections: 97
- Interceptions: 22
- Forced fumbles: 7
- Defensive touchdowns: 4
- Stats at Pro Football Reference

Christopher Harris Jr. (born June 18, 1989) is an American former professional football player who was a cornerback for 12 seasons in the National Football League, primarily with the Denver Broncos. He played college football for the Kansas Jayhawks and was signed by the Broncos as an undrafted free agent in 2011. Harris is considered one of the greatest undrafted players in NFL history.

In his first season, Harris was named to the All-Rookie Team. In 2015, Harris finished the season winning Super Bowl 50 with the Broncos over the Carolina Panthers, a season during which he was again selected as an All-Pro and chosen for the Pro Bowl. He is known for his off the field charitable activities, and in 2012, he started the Chris Harris Jr. Foundation to support children in need.

== Early life ==
Harris was born in Tulsa, Oklahoma and attended nearby Bixby High School in Bixby, Oklahoma where he earned varsity letters in football, basketball, and track. Harris was named All-State in basketball and football as defensive back senior year (2006) after helping the Spartans to the district title.

Harris was an all-metro first-team selection after his junior and senior seasons. He earned all-state honorable mention honors as a junior. He collected 61 total tackles, four interceptions, and seven pass break-ups in 2006. Harris had 23 receptions for 839 yards during his senior campaign.

Harris helped lead Bixby High School to second place in the 2005 state football championship, coached by Pat McGrew. Harris was a member of the academic state champions teams in 2005 and 2006. Harris was named a 2006 leader (top 50 students at Bixby) by the Bixby Optimist Club.

== College career ==
Harris played football in college at the University of Kansas. He received numerous accolades and produced numbers that set him apart as one of the most successful defensive players in the history of Kansas football. By the end of his college career, Harris had placed himself among the most prolific tacklers in school history. He joined as a member of the Omega Psi Phi fraternity while in college.

== Professional career ==
=== Pre-draft ===
Harris was not invited to the NFL Scouting Combine. On March 16, 2011, he attended Kansas's pro day and performed all of the combine and positional drills. At the conclusion of the pre-draft process, Harris was projected to go undrafted in the 2011 NFL draft. He was ranked the 30th best free safety prospect in the draft by NFLDraftScout.com.

Pre-draft measurables
Height	Weight	Arm length	Hand span	40-yard dash	10-yard split	20-yard split	20-yard shuttle	Three-cone drill	Vertical jump	Broad jump	Bench press
5 ft 9 in (1.75 m)	194 lb (88 kg)	35 1/4 in (0.90 m)	9 1/4 in (0.23 m)	4.48 s	1.59 s	2.63 s	4.20 s	7.01 s	34.0 in (0.86 m)	10 ft 1 in (3.07 m)	14 reps
All values from Pro Day

=== Denver Broncos ===
==== 2011 ====
On July 27, 2011, the Denver Broncos signed Harris to a three-year, $1.39 million contract that included a signing bonus of $2,000.

Throughout training camp, Harris competed for a roster spot against Perrish Cox, Chevis Jackson, Darcel McBath, Kyle McCarthy, and Syd'Quan Thompson. He made the final roster after surviving final roster cuts and was named the fourth cornerback on the depth chart behind Champ Bailey, Andre Goodman, and Cassius Vaughn.

He made his professional regular season debut in the Denver Broncos' season-opening 23–20 loss against the Oakland Raiders. The following week, he recorded two solo tackles during a 24–22 victory against the Cincinnati Bengals. Harris began receiving increased playing time after multiple injuries. In Week 4, Harris emerged as a possible future top cornerback prospect after replacing an ineffective Cassius Vaughn and making four combined tackles during a 49–23 loss at the Green Bay Packers. Vaughn and Champ Bailey both suffered hamstring injuries and Andre Goodman suffered a shoulder injury that required stitches. On October 30, 2011, Harris earned his first career start after surpassing Vaughn and Goodman on the depth chart. He recorded nine combined tackles during the Broncos' 45–10 loss to the Detroit Lions. The next week, he made his second consecutive start and recorded a season-high ten combined tackles and made his first career interception off Carson Palmer in a 38–24 victory at the Oakland Raiders. Harris finished his rookie season with a career-high 72 combined tackles (62 solo), six pass deflections, and one interception in 16 games and four starts. He was named to the PFWA All-Rookie Team.

The Denver Broncos finished 8–8, but managed to finish first in the AFC West. On January 8, 2012, he played in his first career playoff game and recorded five combined tackles in a 29–23 overtime victory over the Pittsburgh Steelers in the AFC Wild Card Round. The following week, Harris started his first career playoff game and made eight combined tackles as the Broncos lost 45–10 to the New England Patriots in the AFC Divisional Round.

==== 2012 ====
The Broncos signed free agent Tracy Porter and hired Jack Del Rio as their new defensive coordinator. Harris tied the Broncos’ single-season record with two interceptions returned for touchdowns and posted the fourth-most interception return yards (144) in team history in 2012. He ranked fifth in the NFL in receiving yards allowed (400) and tied for the ninth-fewest completions (35) allowed among players with at least 60 targets during the 2012 season.

On September 30, 2012, Harris recorded three solo tackles and made his first career sack on Carson Palmer during a 37–6 defeat over the Oakland Raiders. Prior to Week 6, Harris was named the starting outside cornerback, along with Champ Bailey, after Tracy Porter was inactive due to seizure-like symptoms. On October 15, 2012, Harris made four solo tackles, two pass deflections, a touchdown, and intercepted San Diego Chargers' quarterback Philip Rivers twice in a 35–24 victory. He intercepted a pass intended for Eddie Royal and returned it 46-yards for his first career touchdown, sealing the victory for the Denver Broncos. On December 16, 2012, Harris recorded a tackle, a pass deflection, and intercepted a pass by Ravens' quarterback Joe Flacco and returned it for a 98-yard touchdown during a 34–17 win at the Baltimore Ravens. At the time, it was the longest interception returned for a touchdown in Broncos' history, although it has since been surpassed by Aqib Talib’s 103-yard interception return for a touchdown against the Dallas Cowboys in 2017 and Pat Surtain II’s 100-yard pick six against the Las Vegas Raiders in 2024. On December 23, 2012, he collected a season-high eight solo tackles in the Broncos' 34–12 victory at the Cleveland Browns. He finished the 2012 season with 61 combined tackles (51 solo), 12 pass deflections, three interceptions, 2.5 sacks, and two touchdowns in 15 games and 12 starts.

The Denver Broncos finished atop the AFC West with a 13–3 record in Peyton Manning's first season with the team. On January 12, 2013, Harris started and recorded three solo tackles and four pass deflections in the Broncos' 38–35 2OT loss to the Baltimore Ravens in the AFC Divisional Round.

==== 2013 ====
Harris returned from his stellar season to enter training camp behind newly acquired free agent Dominique Rodgers-Cromartie on the depth chart. Head coach John Fox named him the third cornerback behind Champ Bailey and Rodgers-Cromartie to start the regular season.

He started the Denver Broncos' season-opener against Baltimore and recorded three solo tackles, a pass deflection, and intercepted Joe Flacco during their 49–27 victory on Thursday Night Football. The following week, he made six combined tackles, two pass deflections, and intercepted Eli Manning after the ball deflected off Tony Carter's foot during the Broncos' 41–23 victory at the New York Giants. On October 13, 2013, Harris recorded a season-high 11 combined tackles in a 35–19 victory against the Jacksonville Jaguars. He finished the 2013 season with 65 combined tackles (58 solo), 14 pass deflections, and a career-high three interceptions in 16 games and 15 starts.

The Denver Broncos finished first in the AFC West with 13–3 record. On January 12, 2014, Harris recorded two solo tackles and deflected a pass during a 24–17 victory over the San Diego Chargers in the AFC Divisional Round. He left the game after suffering a torn ACL and missed the remainder of the playoffs. After defeating the New England Patriots in the AFC Championship, the Broncos went on to Super Bowl XLVIII where they were defeated by the Seattle Seahawks 43–8.

==== 2014 ====
Harris underwent surgery to repair his partially torn ACL in February and was on schedule to return in July. On May 7, 2014, the Denver Broncos placed a second round tender on Harris that also paid him $2.18 million for 2014.

With Harris injured, the Broncos opted to draft Bradley Roby in the first round (31st overall) of the 2014 NFL draft. They signed free agent and his former Kansas teammate Aqib Talib and opted not to re-sign longtime veteran Champ Bailey. Head coach John Fox named Harris and Talib the starting cornerbacks to begin the 2014 regular season against the Colts. On December 7, 2014, Harris recorded a season-high tying five solo tackles, a pass deflection, a sack, and intercepted a pass attempt by Kyle Orton in the Broncos' 24–17 win against the Buffalo Bills. On December 12, 2014, the Denver Broncos signed Harris to a four-year, $42.5 million contract extension that includes $10.9 million guaranteed and a signing bonus of $10 million. He finished the 2014 season with 54 combined tackles (50 solo), 17 pass deflections, three interceptions, and a sack in 16 games and 16 starts. He led the league in least passing yards allowed and did not give up a touchdown pass all season long, earning him a Pro Bowl selection and second-team AP All-Pro honors.

The Denver Broncos finished first in the AFC West with a 12–4 record, but lost 24–13 in the AFC Divisional Round to the Indianapolis Colts.

==== 2015 ====
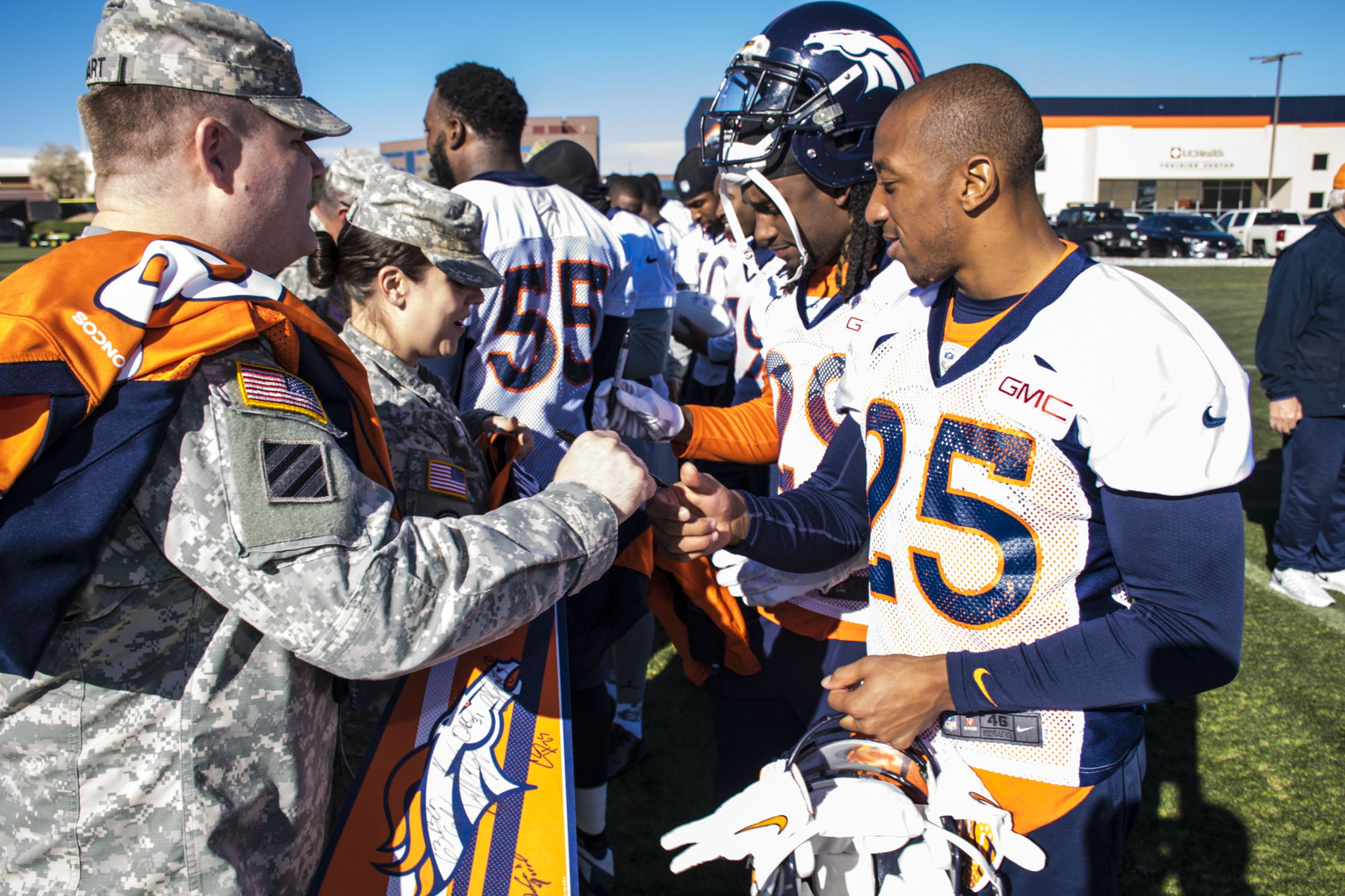
Harris along with Bradley Roby signing autographs in 2015.

Harris retained his spot as the starting left cornerback and Talib retained his spot as the starting right cornerback for the 2015 season under new defensive coordinator Wade Phillips.

On October 4, 2015, Harris recorded a season-high eight combined tackles during a 23–20 win against the Minnesota Vikings. The following week, Harris made his most notable play of the regular season, intercepting Derek Carr and returning it for a 75-yard touchdown which was the Broncos only touchdown in their 16–10 victory at the Oakland Raiders. Harris finished the regular season with 58 combined tackles (49 solo), six pass deflections, two interceptions, two forced fumbles, and a touchdown in 16 games and 16 starts.

After defeating the Pittsburgh Steelers in the AFC Divisional Round and the New England Patriots in the AFC Championship, the Denver Broncos went on to appear in Super Bowl 50. On February 7, 2016, Harris recorded five solo tackles and a sack as the Broncos defeated the Carolina Panthers 24–10 to win Super Bowl 50. Harris didn't allow a touchdown reception in coverage from December 1, 2013, to December 15, 2015, a span that covered 35 games (including playoffs). The streak ended against the Steelers and Antonio Brown who was widely regarded as the best wide receiver in the league. He received enough votes from fellow NFL players to rank 52nd on the NFL Top 100 Players of 2016. During the 2015 season, the Denver Broncos secondary gained the nickname the "No Fly Zone" due to their superior coverage ability.

==== 2016 ====
Harris continued to remain as the starting left cornerback through the 2016 season. He started the Denver Broncos' season-opening victory against the Carolina Panthers, opposite Aqib Talib, in a Super Bowl 50 rematch and recorded two solo tackles, three pass deflections, and intercepted Cam Newton in Denver's 21–20 victory. On October 24, 2016, Harris collected a season-high seven combined tackles during a 27–9 victory against the Houston Texans. He finished the 2016 season with 63 combined tackles (57 solo), 11 pass deflections, and two interceptions in 16 games and 15 starts.

For the first time in Harris's six-year career, the Broncos missed the playoffs with a 9–7 record. Harris was voted to his third consecutive Pro Bowl after the 2016 season and was named First-team All-Pro. He was ranked 63rd on the NFL Top 100 Players of 2017.

==== 2017 ====
New head coach Vance Joseph retained all of the starters in the Denver Broncos' secondary in 2017. On September 17, 2017, Harris recorded a season-high six solo tackles, two pass deflections, and an interception off quarterback Dak Prescott during a 42–17 victory over the Dallas Cowboys. In Week 13, he made two combined tackles, deflected a pass, and intercepted a pass attempt by Jay Cutler in Denver's 35–9 loss at the Miami Dolphins. Harris finished the 2017 season with 40 combined tackles (32 solo), seven pass deflections, and two interceptions in 16 games and 16 starts. He was ranked 86th by his peers on the NFL Top 100 Players of 2018.

==== 2018 ====
On March 8, 2018, the Broncos exercised Harris' 2018 option, which would allow him to earn $8.5 million for the year.

In Week 7, against the Arizona Cardinals, Harris had 53-yard pick-six in the 45–10 victory. Harris started the first 12 games at left cornerback before suffering a broken fibula in Week 14. He missed the next two games before being placed on injured reserve December 19, 2018. He finished the 2018 season with one sack, 49 total tackles, three interceptions, and ten passes defended in 12 games and starts. He was named to the Pro Bowl.

==== 2019 ====
Harris was retained as the Broncos’ starting left cornerback for the 2019 season under new head coach Vic Fangio and defensive coordinator Ed Donatell. In Week 6 against the Tennessee Titans, Harris recorded his first and only interception of the season off Marcus Mariota and forced a fumble in the 16–0 win. He finished the 2019 season with 56 total tackles, one interception, six passes defended, and one forced fumble. He was named to the Pro Football Hall of Fame All-Decade Team for the 2010s.

=== Los Angeles Chargers ===
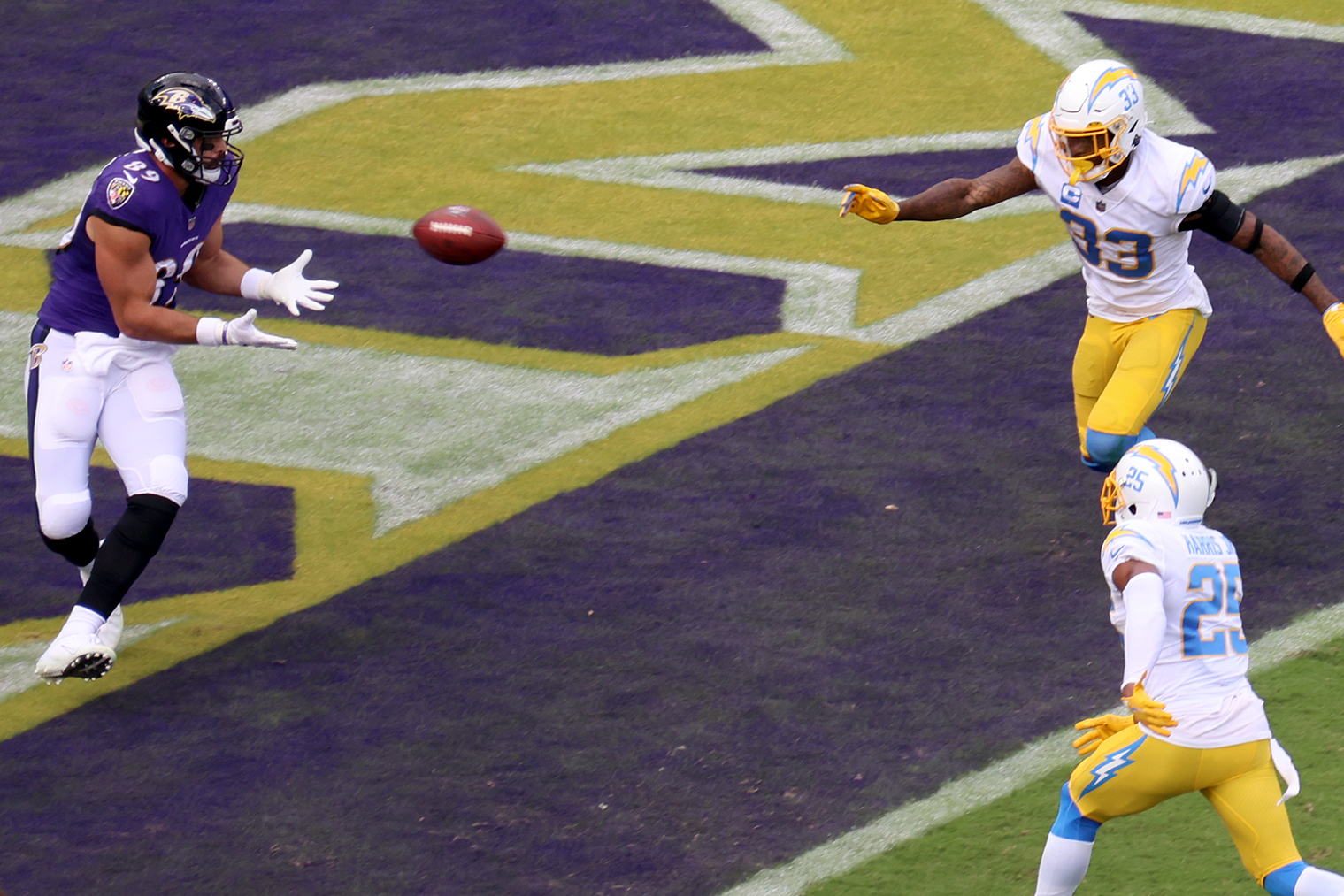
Harris (#25) playing against the Baltimore Ravens in 2021.

On March 30, 2020, Harris signed a two-year, $20 million contract with the Los Angeles Chargers. Harris was named the starting left cornerback opposite Casey Hayward to begin the 2020 season. In Week 3, Harris suffered a foot injury and was placed on injured reserve on September 29, 2020. He was activated on November 27, 2020. In Week 15 against the Las Vegas Raiders, Harris recorded his first interception as a Charger off a pass thrown by Marcus Mariota and made a 51 yard return during the 30–27 overtime win. In the 2020 season, Harris finished with .5 sacks, 37 total tackles, one interception, and two passes defended in nine games.

In the 2021 season, Harris finished with 37 total tackles, one interception, and six passes defended in 14 games and 11 starts.

=== New Orleans Saints ===
On October 4, 2022, the New Orleans Saints signed Harris to the practice squad. He was elevated from the practice squad via a standard elevation on October 15. He played in the team's Week 7 Thursday Night Football game against the Arizona Cardinals. He was signed to the active roster on October 29. Harris finished the 2022 season with one sack, 29 total tackles, three passes defended, and one forced fumble in ten games and four starts.

Harris became a free agent following the season, and stated that he would wait to sign a deal with the hopes of catching on with a Super Bowl contender. On his strategy, Harris said "I want to wait and see what team has a great chance to win a Super Bowl and then try to hop on with them."

=== Retirement ===
Harris announced his retirement on April 30, 2024, after no team was willing to sign him, stating "I realized that everybody was pretty much moving on with the younger players, the younger wave, so I thought it would be great to just call it an end."

== NFL career statistics ==
Legend
	Won the Super Bowl
**Bold**	Career high

Year	Team	Games		Tackles				Fumbles			Interceptions					
Year	Team	GP	GS	Cmb	Solo	Ast	Sck	FF	FR	Yds	Int	Yds	Avg	Lng	TD	PD
2011	DEN	**16**	4	**72**	**62**	10	0.0	0	**1**	0	1	15	15.0	15	0	6
2012	DEN	15	12	61	51	10	**2.5**	0	**1**	0	**3**	**144**	48.0	**98**	**2**	9
2013	DEN	**16**	15	65	58	7	0.0	0	0	0	**3**	1	0.3	1	0	14
2014	DEN	**16**	**16**	54	50	4	1.0	1	**1**	0	**3**	52	17.3	38	0	**17**
2015	DEN	**16**	**16**	58	49	9	0.0	**2**	0	0	2	94	47.0	74	1	6
2016	DEN	**16**	15	63	57	6	0.0	1	**1**	**6**	2	36	18.0	36	0	11
2017	DEN	**16**	15	40	32	8	0.0	1	0	0	2	36	18.0	23	0	7
2018	DEN	12	12	49	40	9	1.0	0	0	0	**3**	68	22.7	53	1	10
2019	DEN	**16**	**16**	56	44	**12**	0.0	1	0	0	1	11	11.0	11	0	6
2020	LAC	9	9	37	25	**12**	0.5	0	0	0	1	51	**51.0**	51	0	2
2021	LAC	14	11	37	30	7	0.0	0	0	0	1	0	0.0	0	0	6
2022	NO	10	4	29	26	3	1.0	1	0	0	0	0	0.0	0	0	3
Career		172	145	621	524	97	6.0	7	4	6	22	508	23.1	98	4	97

== Personal life ==
In 2012, Harris married his college sweetheart, Leah, with whom he has five daughters.

In 2013, Harris started the Chris Harris Jr. Foundation. The foundation's fundamental goal is to support what Harris refers to as 'underdogs' through various charitable activities. Harris holds an annual free football camp for kids called the 'Underdog Football Academy', has been a national spokesman against domestic violence through DVIS, and his foundation has worked extensively with Big Brothers Big Sisters of America and The Salvation Army.

In addition to the foundation's work, Harris and his wife are involved with Big Brothers and Big Sisters. Harris and his wife have a little brother and little sister that they personally mentor in addition to working with the organization in general.

In 2017, Harris participated in PETA's "Cold Dog Challenge," experiencing a night in the cold so as to encourage people to bring their pets inside.

== See also ==
- No Fly Zone
