= Doug Baldwin =

American football player (born 1988)

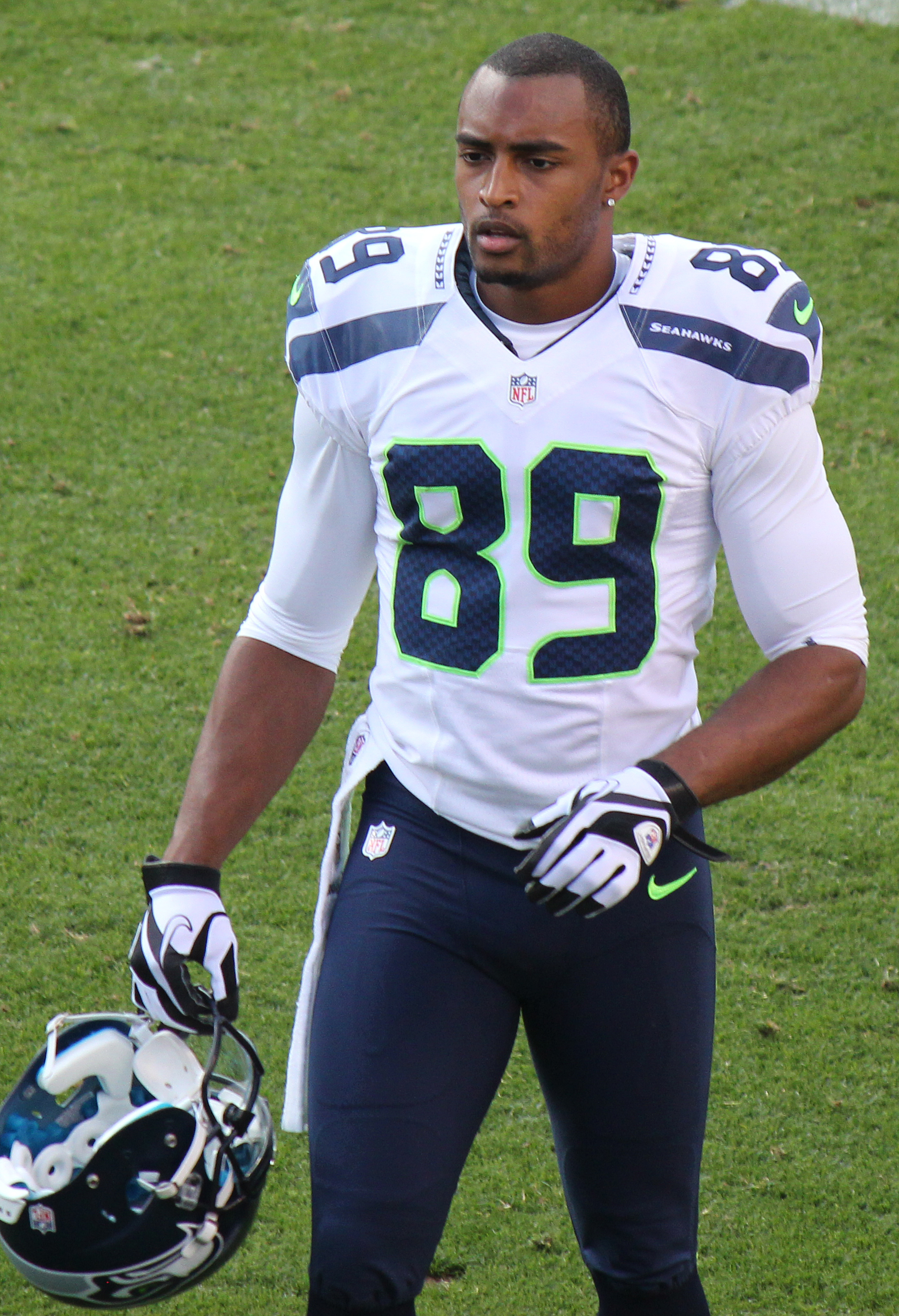
- Baldwin with the Seattle Seahawks in 2012

No. 15, 89
- Position: Wide receiver

Personal information
- Born: September 21, 1988 (age 38); Gulf Breeze, Florida, U.S.
- Listed height: 5 ft 10 in (1.78 m)
- Listed weight: 192 lb (87 kg)

Career information
- High school: Gulf Breeze
- College: Stanford (2007–2010)
- NFL draft: 2011: undrafted

Career history
- Seattle Seahawks (2011–2018)

Awards and highlights
- Super Bowl champion (XLVIII); 2× Pro Bowl (2016, 2017); NFL receiving touchdowns co-leader (2015); Seattle Seahawks Top 50 players; Second-team All-Pac-10 (2010)

Career NFL statistics
- Receptions: 493
- Receiving yards: 6,563
- Receiving touchdowns: 49
- Stats at Pro Football Reference

Douglas Dewayne Baldwin Jr. (born September 21, 1988) is an American former professional football player who spent his entire eight-season career as a wide receiver with the Seattle Seahawks of the National Football League (NFL). He played college football for the Stanford Cardinal and was signed by the Seahawks as an undrafted free agent in 2011. Baldwin is the Seahawks fourth all-time leader in team receptions and receiving yards, third in receiving touchdowns and was selected to the Pro Bowl twice and won Super Bowl XLVIII in 2014 with the team.

== Early life ==
Baldwin grew up in Gulf Breeze, Florida. He played youth football and ran track in Pensacola alongside future NFL running back Alfred Morris. He attended Gulf Breeze High School and played on the school's football team, the Gulf Breeze Dolphins. As a senior, Baldwin had 42 receptions for 682 yards (16.2 avg.) with six touchdowns.

In addition to football, Baldwin also competed in track and field. He competed in the jumping events, recording top-jumps of 1.94 meters in the high jump and 6.65 meters in the long jump.

== College career ==
Baldwin played college football for the Stanford Cardinal from 2007 to 2010, serving as a wide receiver and kick returner. In his senior year, he led the Cardinal in receiving yards and touchdowns. In all four seasons with the Cardinal, Baldwin's head coach was Jim Harbaugh.

== Professional career ==
Pre-draft measurables
Height	Weight	40-yard dash	10-yard split	20-yard split	20-yard shuttle	Three-cone drill	Vertical jump	Broad jump	Bench press
5 ft 9 3/4 in (1.77 m)	189 lb (86 kg)	4.48 s	1.54 s	2.53 s	4.26 s	6.56 s	37 in (0.94 m)	10 ft 3 in (3.12 m)	6 reps
All values from Pro Day

=== 2011 season ===
Despite leading Stanford in receiving yards as a senior, Baldwin went undrafted in the 2011 NFL draft. He signed with the Seattle Seahawks as an undrafted free agent following the end of the 2011 NFL lockout to a three-year deal worth $1.4 million.

Baldwin caught his first career NFL touchdown, a 55-yard reception from quarterback Tarvaris Jackson, in Week 1 of the 2011 season against the San Francisco 49ers, a team which was coached by Jim Harbaugh, Baldwin's former college coach. He finished fourth in rookie reception yardage in the 2011 NFL season, and led the Seahawks in both receiving yards and receptions. He also made the USA Today All-Joe Team for players who are talented and had put up good numbers, but did not receive a Pro Bowl bid. He became the first undrafted rookie free agent to lead his team in receptions and yards receiving since the AFL-NFL merger.

=== 2012 season ===
Baldwin changed his uniform number from #15 to #89 for the 2012 NFL season to allow the incoming quarterback Matt Flynn to have #15. After week 1 of the 2012 season, Baldwin required dental surgery after diving for a pass. He suffered a shoulder injury during practice prior to Week 3 and a high ankle sprain during a punt return in Week 7, both of which kept him out the following weeks' games.

In the 2012 regular season, Baldwin had 29 receptions for 336 yards and three touchdowns in his first season with quarterback Russell Wilson.

Baldwin and the Seahawks made the playoffs after a successful regular season. Against the Washington Redskins in the Wild Card Round, Baldwin had two receptions for 39 yards in the 24–14 victory at FedExField. In the Divisional Round against the Atlanta Falcons, Baldwin had one reception for six yards in the 30–28 loss at the Georgia Dome.

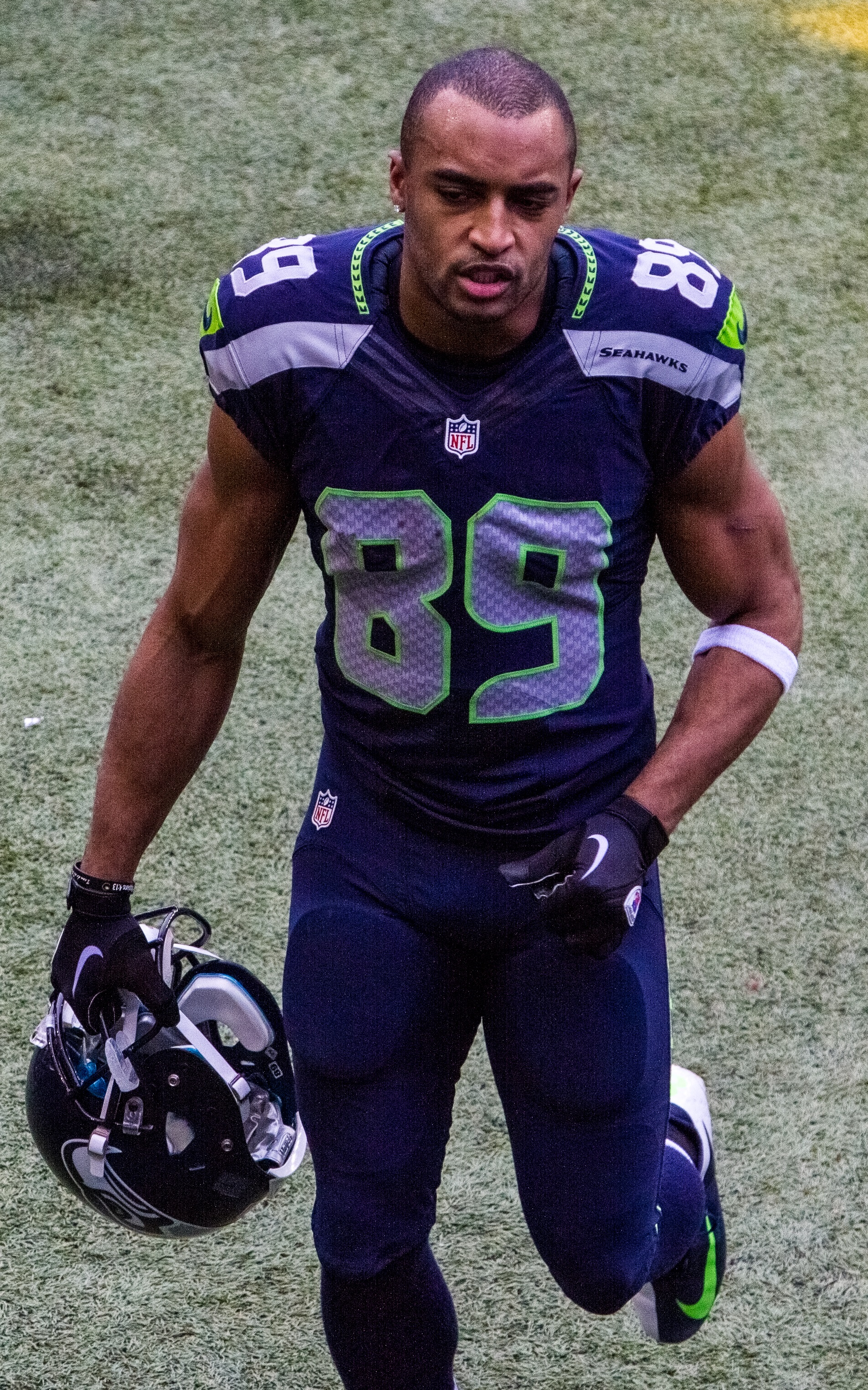
Baldwin in a game against the St. Louis Rams in 2013

=== 2013 season: Super Bowl run ===
==== Regular season ====
In his third season, Baldwin and the Seahawks had a very successful year. Baldwin caught a career-high five touchdowns in the 2013 season. In the season opener against the Carolina Panthers, he had a season-high seven receptions for 91 receiving yards. Two weeks later, he had his first receiving touchdown of the season, a 35-yard touchdown pass from Tarvaris Jackson, against the Jacksonville Jaguars in Week 3. On November 3 against the Tampa Bay Buccaneers, he had six receptions for 75 yards and a touchdown in the 27–24 victory in Week 9. Overall, in the 2013 regular season, he had 50 receptions for 778 yards and five touchdowns. He finished second on the team in receptions and yards.

==== Postseason ====
As a result of the Seahawks 13–3 regular season record, Baldwin and the rest of the team received a first-round bye.

In the Divisional Round against the New Orleans Saints, Baldwin had two receptions for 30 yards in the 23–15 victory. In the NFC Championship against the San Francisco 49ers, Baldwin had six receptions for 106 yards in the 23–17 victory.

==== Super Bowl XLVIII ====
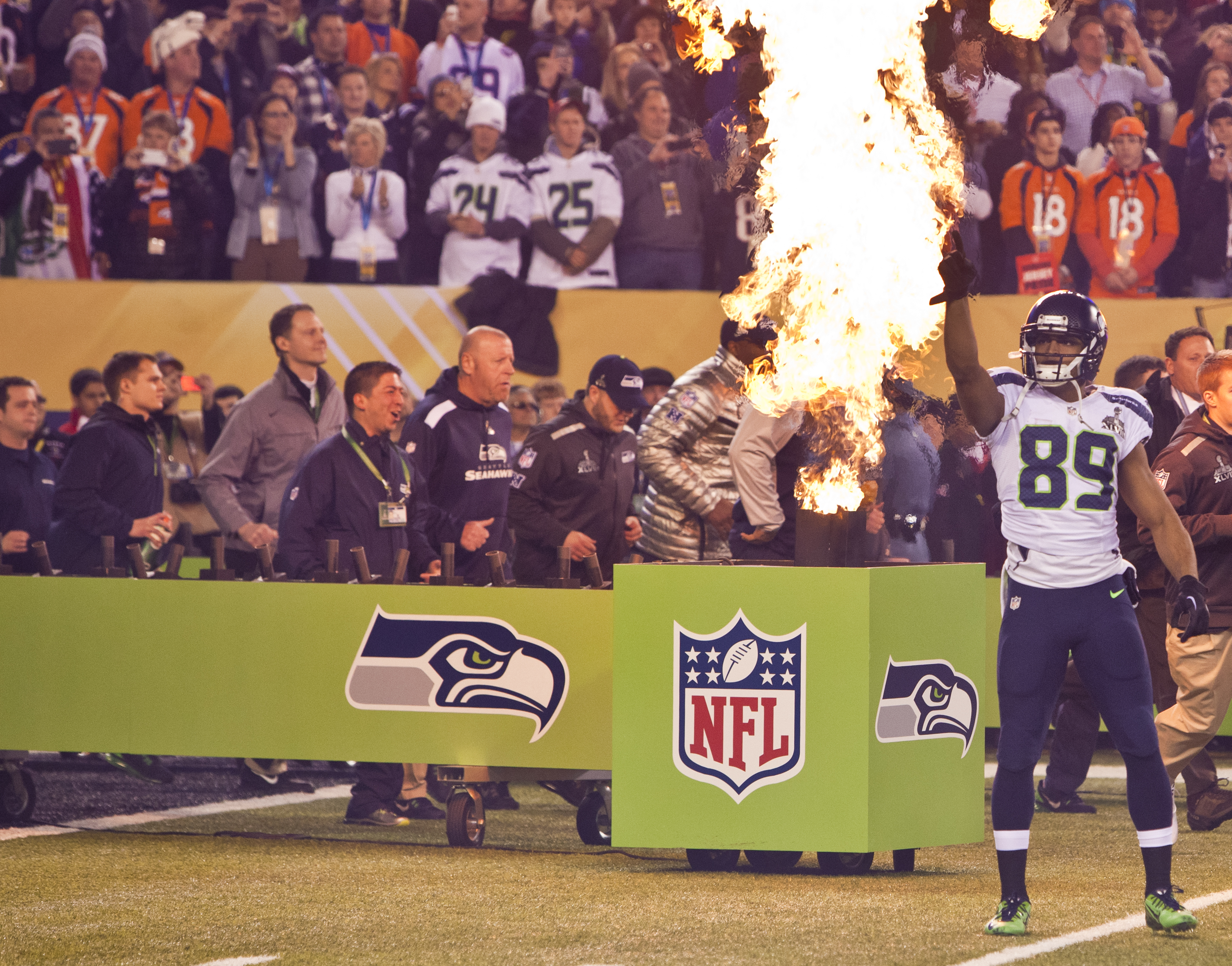
Baldwin before the start of Super Bowl XLVIII.

In Super Bowl XLVIII against the Denver Broncos, Baldwin led all Seahawks wide receivers with five receptions for 66 yards and a touchdown in the 43–8 victory.

Prior to the Super Bowl, former NFL wide receiver Cris Carter made comments questioning the quality of the Seattle receiving corps. After the game, Doug Baldwin said, "OK, y'all listen to me loud and clear," he said. "Y'all listening? Y'all hear me? For all y'all who called us, the receiving corps, average, pedestrian, appetizers—I'm not going to say any names, but he knows who he is—I respect what you did on the field, but stick to playing football, because your analytical skills ain't up to par yet. You need to slow down and go back and not do it half-assed and put some effort into it, because you're saying some stuff that didn't really make sense... That dude who said that we were appetizers, he told me to Google him, and I did Google him, but I didn't see any Super Bowl appearances, and I also saw two losses in conference championships. I have a Super Bowl ring, and I would gladly show that to him. And if he doesn't have time to come see it, tell him he can Google it."

=== 2014 season: Return to the Super Bowl ===
On March 7, 2014, the Seahawks placed a one-year, second-round tender worth $2.187 million on Baldwin, but he never signed it. Instead, on May 29, Baldwin signed a new two-year, $13 million contract, which included the one-year tender offered to him earlier, making his contract extension three years. Baldwin became the primary receiving threat on the Seahawks after Percy Harvin was traded to the New York Jets.

==== Regular season ====
In the season opener against the Green Bay Packers on Thursday Night Football, Baldwin had three receptions for 14 yards in the 36–16 victory. Baldwin had his second career regular-season 100-yard game in Week 7 against the St. Louis Rams, reeling in seven passes for 123 yards and a touchdown in a 28–26 defeat. In Week 14, Baldwin had five catches for 97 yards and a touchdown, and also drew a long pass interference penalty, in a 24–14 victory over the Philadelphia Eagles. In Week 16, he had seven receptions for 113 yards against the Arizona Cardinals. Baldwin's 66 receptions and 825 receiving yards for the season were both career highs. In addition, he totaled three receiving touchdowns on the season.

==== Postseason ====
In the Divisional Round against the Carolina Panthers, Baldwin caught a 16-yard touchdown pass for the first score of the game in an eventual 31–17 victory. In the NFC Championship against the Green Bay Packers, Baldwin had six catches for 106 yards, including a 35-yard catch in overtime immediately preceding the game-winning touchdown by wide receiver Jermaine Kearse. Baldwin took over kick return duties in this game due to injury, fumbling once and averaging just 19.3 yards on three returns.

In Super Bowl XLIX, Baldwin was held to one catch for three yards and scored Seattle's last touchdown of the season as they failed to repeat as Super Bowl champions. Baldwin celebrated the touchdown with a vulgar pantomime which gained significant attention on social media as the "poopdown", and which earned a 15-yard penalty for unsportsmanlike conduct. He commented after the game that the celebration was directed at an unnamed group, who were not present at the game. He was later fined $11,025 for his actions by the NFL. The Seahawks did not score again in the game, and went on to lose 28–24 to the New England Patriots. Baldwin later apologized for the incident, clarifying that the gesture was directed at opposing star cornerback Darrelle Revis, and that "it was just kind of a built-up frustration I was letting out in that sequence, between him and I."

=== 2015 season ===
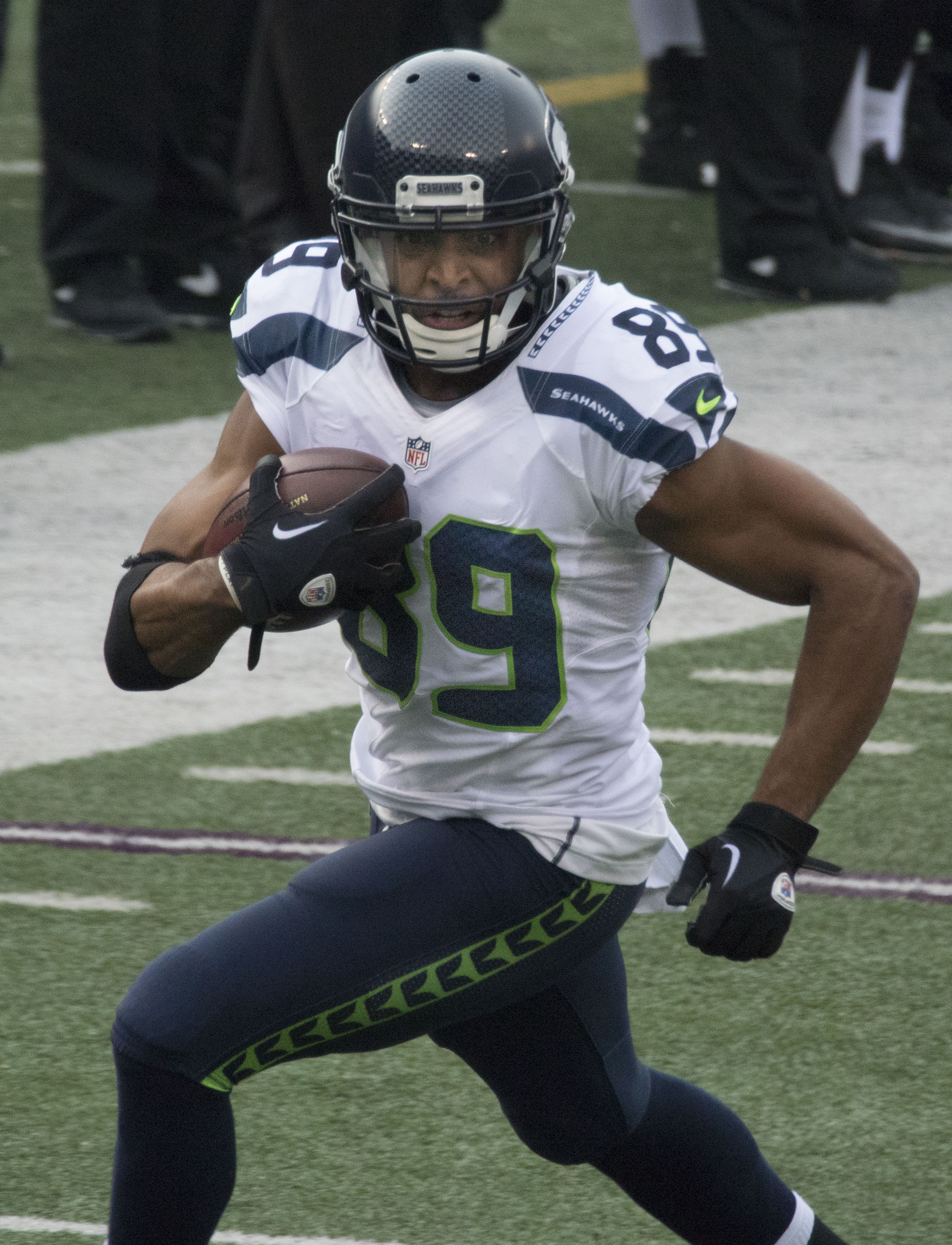
Baldwin against the Ravens in 2015

During the 2015 offseason, the Seahawks acquired Pro Bowl tight end Jimmy Graham from the New Orleans Saints and drafted speedy Kansas State wide receiver Tyler Lockett, giving Baldwin and the Seahawks two more offensive weapons. Baldwin entered training camp as the projected #1 receiver for Seattle.

In Week 9 against the Arizona Cardinals, Baldwin had seven receptions for 134 yards and a touchdown in a 32–39 loss. In Week 12 against the Steelers, Baldwin had a huge day, with six receptions for 145 yards and three touchdowns. The third touchdown against Pittsburgh came on a career-high 80-yard touchdown on a third down play, effectively ending the game, which the Seahawks won by a score of 39–30. His performance against the Steelers was the first three-touchdown game of Baldwin's career.

In Week 13 against the Minnesota Vikings, Baldwin had another big day, with five receptions for 94 yards and two touchdowns in a 38–7 victory. The next week, Baldwin and the Seahawks went to Baltimore to face the Ravens and Baldwin again had a great game, with six receptions for 82 yards and three touchdowns. In Week 15 against the Cleveland Browns, Baldwin had four receptions for 45 yards and two touchdowns. After his performance against the Browns, Baldwin joined Hall of Famer Jerry Rice as the only players in league history with at least 10 receiving touchdowns in a four-game span. Baldwin also caught at least two touchdowns in four straight games, a feat that only Calvin Johnson and Hall of Famer Cris Carter have accomplished since 1960.

In Week 16 against the Rams, Baldwin recorded 10 catches for 118 yards and a touchdown. Although the Seahawks lost by a score of 23–17, Baldwin set a team record for touchdown receptions in a single season with 14, surpassing the mark of 13 set by Daryl Turner. He also became the first Seahawks receiver to record 1,000 receiving yards since 2007. After Week 17, his season totals of 78 receptions for 1,069 yards and 14 touchdowns were all career highs. His 14 touchdowns led the league for the 2015 season.

In the Wild Card Round against the Minnesota Vikings, Baldwin registered five catches for 42 yards and the only touchdown scored in the game, which the Seahawks won by a score of 10–9. The Seahawks' season ended the following week against the eventual NFC Champion Carolina Panthers in the Divisional Round. In the 31–24 loss, Baldwin had eight receptions for 82 yards.

Baldwin was ranked as the 72nd best player in the NFL by his peers on the NFL Top 100 Players of 2016.

=== 2016 season ===
Baldwin and the Seahawks agreed to a four-year contract extension worth $46 million, with $24.25 million guaranteed. At the time, Baldwin became the sixth-highest paid wide receiver in the NFL.

Baldwin started the 2016 season with a nine-catch, 92-yard outing against the Miami Dolphins, including a three-yard touchdown catch with less than a minute left to secure a narrow 12–10 victory for the Seahawks. Two weeks later against the San Francisco 49ers, Baldwin hauled in eight receptions for then a career-high 164 receiving yards, including a touchdown. In Week 10 on the road against the New England Patriots, he caught six passes for 59 yards, including three touchdowns, equaling a career-high. The following week against the Philadelphia Eagles, he caught four passes for 104 yards and threw his first career touchdown pass on a reverse wide receiver pass to Russell Wilson. Against the Arizona Cardinals in Week 16, he recorded 13 catches for another career-high 171 receiving yards and a touchdown. Much like the 2015 season, Baldwin's 2016 season was a strong one, and he finished with 94 receptions 1,128 yards and seven touchdowns. In the playoffs, Baldwin continued his strong play. In the Wild Card Round against the sixth-seeded Detroit Lions, Baldwin recorded 11 receptions for 104 yards and a touchdown as the Seahawks defeated the Lions by a score of 26–6. In the Divisional Round, Baldwin again had another strong performance against the second-seeded Atlanta Falcons, catching five passes for 80 yards and a touchdown. However, the Seahawks' season ended as they fell by a score of 36–20. On January 23, 2017, Baldwin was named to his first career Pro Bowl as an injury replacement for Larry Fitzgerald of the Arizona Cardinals. He was also ranked 88th by his fellow players on the NFL Top 100 Players of 2017.

=== 2017 season ===
Baldwin caught 75 passes for 991 yards and eight touchdowns during the 2017 season. He had two 100+ yard games: 10 receptions for 105 yards and a touchdown in a Week 3 loss to Tennessee and seven receptions for 108 yards and a touchdown in a Week 8 loss to Washington. He scored two receiving touchdowns in the regular season finale against the Arizona Cardinals. He was named to the 2018 Pro Bowl as an injury replacement for Larry Fitzgerald. He was ranked 99th by his peers on the NFL Top 100 Players of 2018.

=== 2018 season ===
Baldwin suffered an elbow injury early in Week 1 of the 2018 season, limiting him to just six receptions for 42 yards through the first five weeks. In Week 6, he had six receptions for 91 yards in the 27–3 win over Oakland, but re-aggravated the elbow. In Week 15, against the San Francisco 49ers, he had two receiving touchdowns in the 26–23 loss. In the following game against the Kansas City Chiefs, he had seven receptions for 126 receiving yards and a touchdown in the 38–31 victory. He finished the 2018 season with 50 receptions for 618 receiving yards and five touchdowns. The Seahawks made the playoffs and faced off against the Dallas Cowboys in the Wild Card Round. In the 24–22 loss, Baldwin had three receptions for 32 yards in what would be his final game in the NFL.

On May 9, 2019, the Seahawks released Baldwin with a failed physical designation.

On May 12, 2019, Baldwin announced his retirement on Twitter.

== Career statistics ==
=== NFL ===
Legend
	Won the Super Bowl
	Led the league
**Bold**	Career high

Year	Team	Games		Receiving					Rushing					Kick returns					Fumbles	
Year	Team	GP	GS	Rec	Yds	Avg	Lng	TD	Att	Yds	Avg	Lng	TD	Ret	Yds	Avg	Lng	TD	Fum	Lost
2011	SEA	**16**	1	51	788	15.5	55	4	1	−2	−2.0	−2	0	1	37	**37.0**	**37**	0	0	0
2012	SEA	14	4	29	366	12.6	50	3	—	—	—	—	—	1	3	3.0	3	0	0	0
2013	SEA	**16**	9	50	778	**15.6**	52	5	2	6	3.0	3	0	2	57	28.5	**37**	0	0	0
2014	SEA	**16**	**16**	66	825	12.5	49	3	1	**8**	**8.0**	**8**	0	**5**	**81**	16.2	24	0	0	0
2015	SEA	**16**	**16**	78	1,069	13.7	**80**	**14**	—	—	—	—	—	—	—	—	—	—	**1**	0
2016	SEA	**16**	15	**94**	**1,128**	12.0	59	7	**3**	2	0.7	4	0	—	—	—	—	—	**1**	0
2017	SEA	**16**	**16**	75	991	13.2	54	8	2	−8	−4.0	−3	0	—	—	—	—	—	**1**	0
2018	SEA	13	13	50	618	12.4	42	5	—	—	—	—	—	—	—	—	—	—	0	0
Career		123	90	493	6,563	13.3	80	49	9	6	0.7	8	0	9	178	19.8	37	0	3	0

=== College ===
Season	Team	GP	Receiving					Punt returns				Kick returns			
Season	Team	GP	Rec	Yds	Avg	Lng	TD	Ret	Yds	Avg	TD	Ret	Yds	Avg	TD
2007	Stanford	12	10	120	8.5	20	0	2	15	7.5	0	23	555	24.1	0
2008	Stanford	12	23	332	14.4	61	4	18	155	8.6	0	1	25	25.0	0
2009	Stanford	7	4	78	19.5	36	0	3	4	1.3	0	1	64	64.0	0
2010	Stanford	13	58	857	14.8	81	9	7	37	5.3	0	3	62	20.7	0
Career		44	96	1,360	14.2	81	13	30	211	7.0	0	28	706	25.2	0

== Business career ==
Baldwin runs his own investment firm and serves as an advisor to numerous organizations in the Greater Seattle area.

Baldwin has been the chief executive officer (CEO) and managing director of Vault89 since April 2019. Vault89 is a venture capital firm headquartered in Renton, Washington.

Baldwin served as the CEO of Ventrk from September 2021 to October 2023. The company focuses on creating software designed to empower better decision-making and improve outcomes for stronger, healthier lifestyles.

== Philanthropy and community service ==
In 2016, Baldwin testified to Washington State's Joint Legislative Task Force on Use of Deadly Force in Community Policing in support of changing the law to hold more police officers accountable for their uses of force.

Baldwin received the Martin Luther King Jr. Medal of Distinguished Service on April 30, 2018, an award that recognizes individuals who have gone above and beyond in their efforts to make a difference in communities across King County, Washington. The community service honor is an annual award distributed by the King County Council.

Since retiring from the NFL in 2019, Baldwin has joined the board of Valor Worldwide, a Seattle digital media startup and publisher of the Internet property OurMilitary.com, which provides resources and services to the military community. He has also been active in getting his Family First Community Center for the city of Renton, Washington, off the ground.

Baldwin helped establish the Players Coalition and currently serves as a board member of the organization, which is led by NFL players advocating for criminal justice and education reform. Additionally, former Washington state governor Jay Inslee appointed Baldwin to serve a four-year term on the state's Clemency and Pardons Board, which is tasked with reviewing particular criminal cases and providing recommendations to the governor regarding the potential parole status of eligible inmates.

For his continuing philanthropic contributions across the Pacific Northwest, Baldwin received the Paul G. Allen Humanitarian Award at the Seattle Sports Commission's 88th Annual Seattle Sports Star of the Year Awards in February 2023.

== Personal life ==
Baldwin is of African American descent through his father and Filipino descent through his maternal grandmother, who is a native of Tacloban City, Philippines. Before a game against the Minnesota Vikings on November 17, 2013, he carried the Philippine flag onto CenturyLink Field in Seattle, Washington, to honor the victims of Typhoon Haiyan.

Baldwin is a Christian. He frequently posts about his faith and shares various Bible verses on his Twitter account.
