= Kelechi Osemele =

American football player (born 1989)

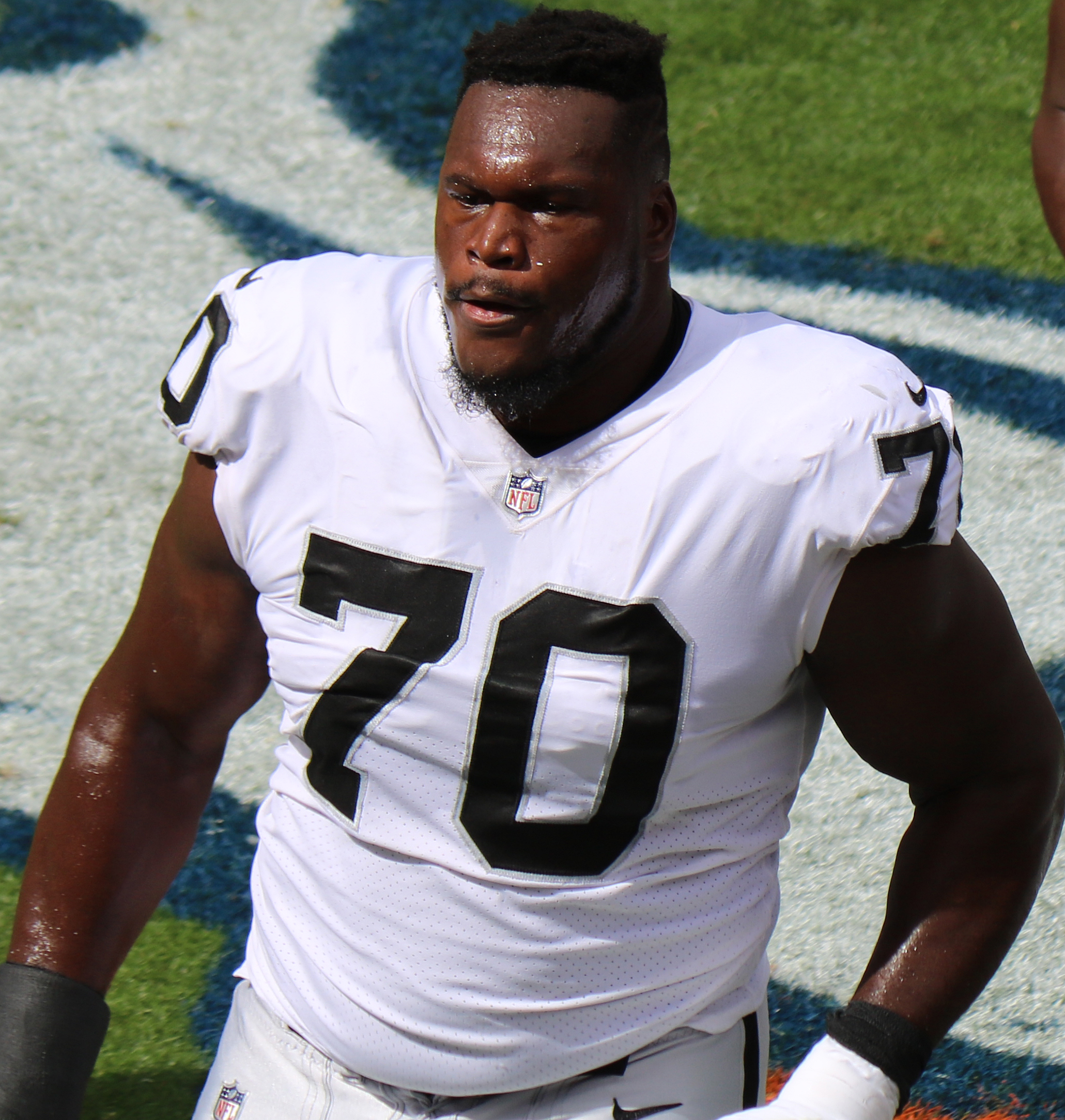
- Osemele with the Oakland Raiders in 2017

No. 72, 70
- Position: Offensive guard

Personal information
- Born: June 24, 1989 (age 37); Houston, Texas, U.S.
- Listed height: 6 ft 5 in (1.96 m)
- Listed weight: 330 lb (150 kg)

Career information
- High school: Langham Creek (Houston)
- College: Iowa State (2007–2011)
- NFL draft: 2012: 2nd round, 60th overall pick

Career history
- Baltimore Ravens (2012–2015); Oakland Raiders (2016–2018); New York Jets (2019); Kansas City Chiefs (2020)

Awards and highlights
- Super Bowl champion (XLVII); First-team All-Pro (2016); 2× Pro Bowl (2016, 2017); First-team All-American (2011); First-team All-Big 12 (2011); Second-team All-Big 12 (2009)

Career NFL statistics
- Games played: 101
- Games started: 101
- Stats at Pro Football Reference

Kelechi Keith Ayo Osemele (/keɪˈleɪtʃi oʊˈsɛməli/; kay-LAY-chee oh-SEM-ə-lee; born June 24, 1989) is an American former professional football player who was an offensive guard in the National Football League (NFL). He played college football for the Iowa State Cyclones. He was selected by the Baltimore Ravens in the second round of the 2012 NFL draft, and was a rookie starter throughout the team's Super Bowl XLVII championship run that season.

== Early life ==
Of Nigerian descent, his name Kelechi means "Thank God" in the Igbo language. Osemele was born and raised in Houston, where he attended Langham Creek High School.

== College career ==
Osemele attended and played college football at Iowa State. Entering his senior season at Iowa State in 2011, Osemele had started 30 consecutive games. He was a second-team all Big 12 selection in 2009 and an honorable mention in 2010.

== Professional career ==
Pre-draft measurables
Height	Weight	Arm length	Hand span	Wingspan	40-yard dash	10-yard split	20-yard split	20-yard shuttle	Three-cone drill	Vertical jump	Broad jump	Bench press
6 ft 5 1/2 in (1.97 m)	333 lb (151 kg)	35 7/8 in (0.91 m)	10 1/4 in (0.26 m)	7 ft 2 in (2.18 m)	5.36 s	1.87 s	3.07 s	4.87 s	7.91 s	26.5 in (0.67 m)	8 ft 8 in (2.64 m)	36 reps
All values from NFL Combine/Pro Day

=== Baltimore Ravens ===
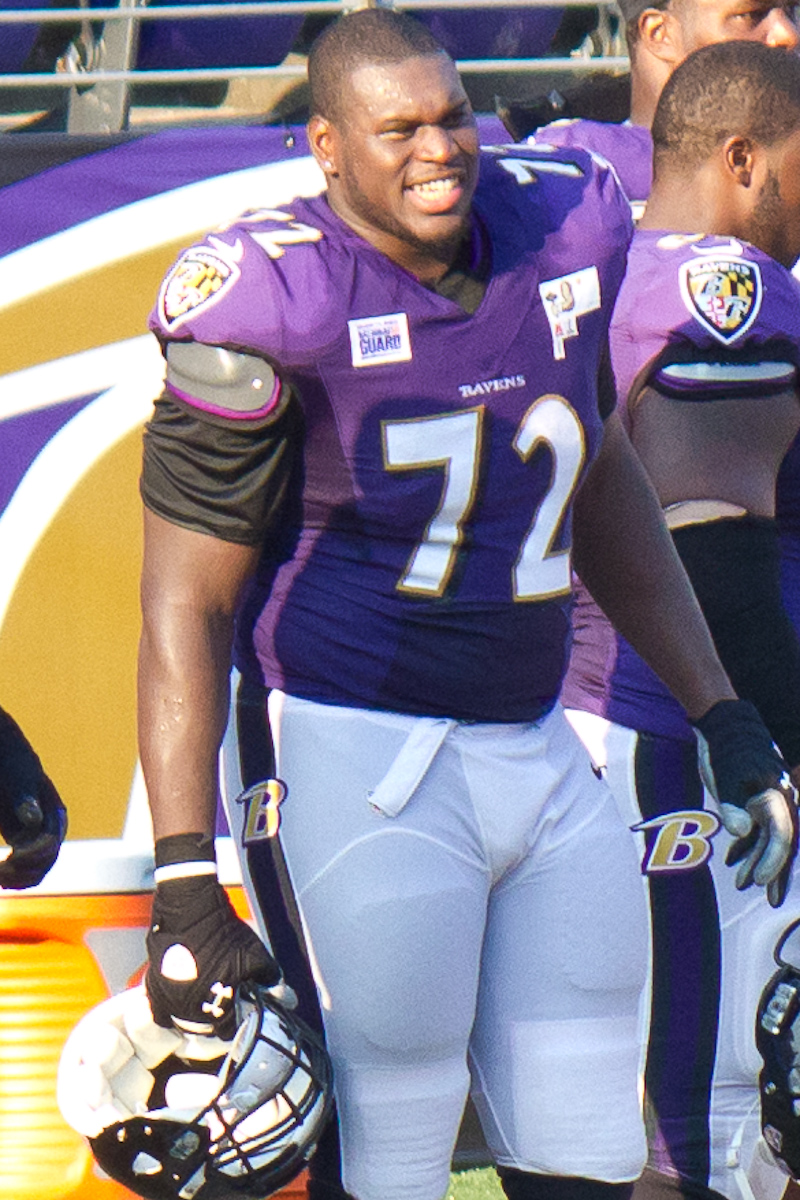
Osemele with the Baltimore Ravens in 2013

Osemele was selected in the second round with 60th overall pick in the 2012 NFL draft by the Baltimore Ravens. He started at right tackle in every Ravens game during his rookie season. He replaced the injured Jah Reid at left guard for the Ravens' playoff run. This, along with the insertion of Bryant McKinnie at left tackle and the move of Michael Oher to right tackle, solidified the offensive line. With the Ravens finishing 10–6, the team won the AFC North pennant and eventually won Super Bowl XLVII over the San Francisco 49ers, making Osemele's rookie year successful giving him his first championship title.

On November 1, 2013, it was announced Osemele would have back surgery. After playing seven games, he would finish the rest of the 2013 season on injured reserve.

Osemele successfully recovered from back surgery and started all but two games for the Ravens in the 2014 season.

=== Oakland Raiders ===
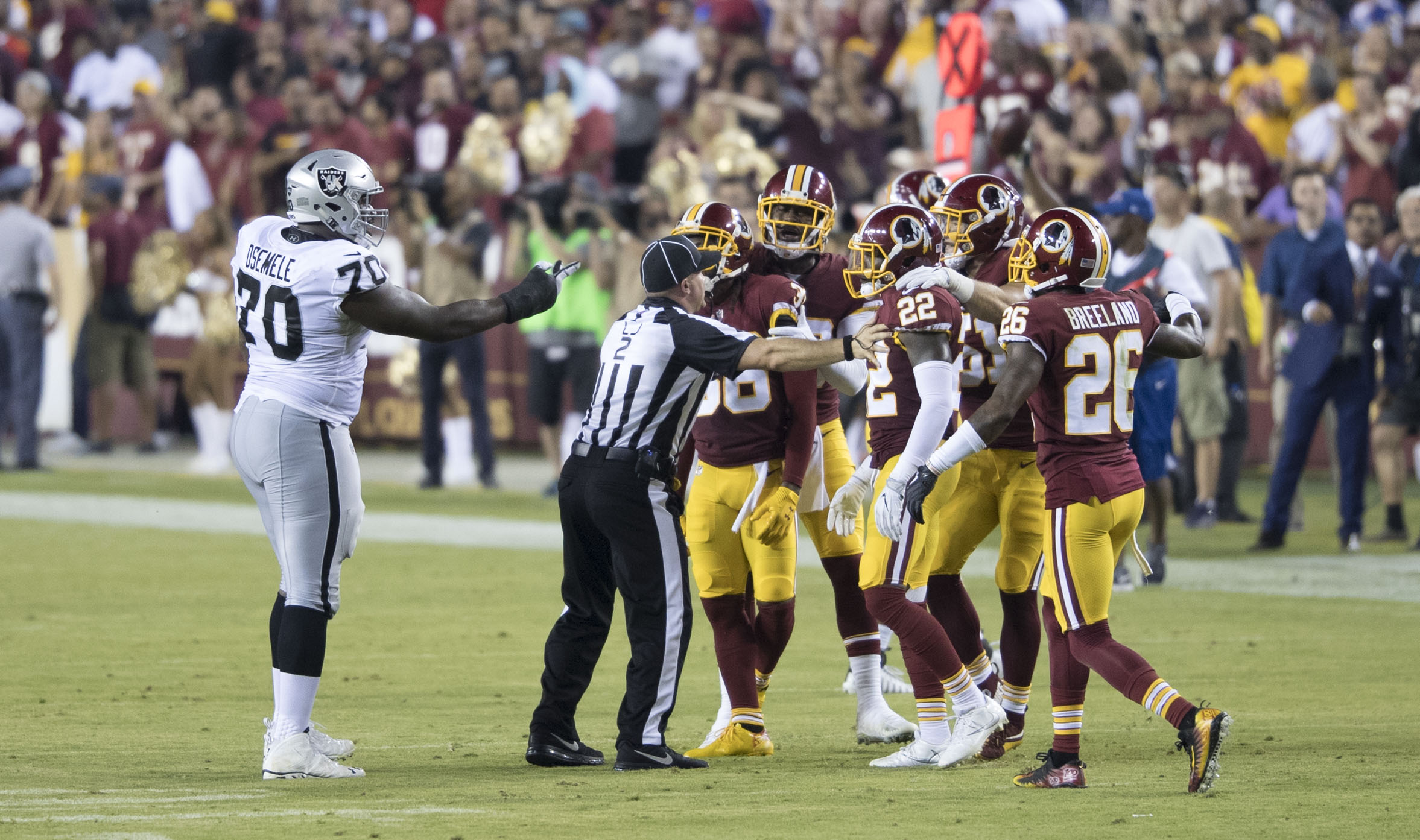
Osemele in a game against the Washington Redskins in 2017

Osemele signed a five-year, $60 million contract with the Oakland Raiders on March 10, 2016. He was selected to his first Pro Bowl for the 2016 season along with fellow Raider offensive linemen Donald Penn and Rodney Hudson. He was also named First-team All-Pro. He was also ranked 95th on the NFL Top 100 Players of 2017.

On December 19, 2017, Osemele was named to his second Pro Bowl along with fellow Raider offensive linemen Donald Penn and Rodney Hudson for the second straight year.

As of October 2018, he was the second-highest paid left guard in the NFL in average salary at $11.7 million, behind the Jaguars' Andrew Norwell ($13.3 million) and ahead of the Tampa Bay Buccaneers' Ali Marpet ($10.825 million).

=== New York Jets ===
On March 10, 2019, the Raiders agreed to trade Osemele and a 2019 sixth round draft pick (originally acquired from the Chicago Bears) to the New York Jets in exchange for a fifth round pick. The deal was completed on March 14, 2019. On October 15, 2019, it was revealed that Osemele suffered a shoulder injury and was contemplating surgery. Osemele's doctors told him that he needed surgery for his injury but the Jets disagreed and did not believe that Osemele needed surgery. Osemele was fined for every practice that he missed due to his injury. On October 26, 2019, Osemele was released from the team after undergoing shoulder surgery.

=== Kansas City Chiefs ===
On July 27, 2020, Osemele signed a one-year deal with the Kansas City Chiefs. He started the first five games at left guard before suffering torn tendons in both his knees in Week 5. He was placed on injured reserve on October 17, 2020.
