= 2017 Pro Bowl =

National Football League all-star game

2017 NFL Pro Bowl
AFC	NFC
20	13
Head coach: Andy Reid (Kansas City Chiefs)	Head coach: Jason Garrett (Dallas Cowboys)
	1	2	3	4	Total
AFC	0	14	3	3	20
NFC	0	7	0	6	13
- Date: January 29, 2017
- Stadium: Camping World Stadium; Orlando, Florida
- Offensive MVP: Travis Kelce (Kansas City Chiefs)
- Defensive MVP: Lorenzo Alexander (Buffalo Bills)
- Referee: Jerome Boger
- Attendance: 60,834

Ceremonies
- National anthem: Olivia Holt
- Coin toss: Tony Gonzalez; Ray Lewis; Charles Woodson; Jerome Bettis
- Halftime show: NFL Flag Football Boys' Championship Game

TV in the United States
- Network: ESPN
- Announcers: Sean McDonough (play-by-play); Jon Gruden (analyst); Lisa Salters (sideline reporter)
- Nielsen ratings: 4.2
- Market share: 7.4 Million

The 2017 Pro Bowl (branded as the 2017 Pro Bowl presented by Aquafina for sponsorship reasons) was the National Football League's all-star game for the 2016 season, which was played at Camping World Stadium in Orlando, Florida, on January 29, 2017. The game was the first in a three-year deal to host the Pro Bowl in Orlando, which also included cross-promotional events (such as a newly established skills competition) held at the Walt Disney World Resort (which is owned by the primary parent company of the game's broadcaster, ESPN).

After three years of using a draft format, the 2017 Pro Bowl returned to the previous conference-based format, played between all-star teams representing the American Football Conference and National Football Conference. The AFC all-stars were coached by Andy Reid, and the NFC all-stars were coached by Jason Garrett.

== Background ==
=== Host selection process ===
At least five locations were in contention to host the 2017 Pro Bowl, with four submitting formal bids.

- Aloha Stadium in Hawaii, the site of the Pro Bowl from 1980 to 2009, 2011–2014, and 2016.
- NRG Stadium in Houston, Texas, the site of Super Bowl LI.
- Camping World Stadium in Orlando, Florida, where Pro Bowl rightsholder ESPN has operations at Walt Disney World.
- An unidentified stadium in Sydney, New South Wales, Australia.
- Maracanã Stadium in Rio de Janeiro, Brazil. The stadium, which had recently been renovated for the 2014 FIFA World Cup and 2016 Summer Olympics, was discussed as a potential hosting site for the event, but Brazil ultimately declined to place a bid.

On June 1, 2016, the NFL announced that it had awarded the next three Pro Bowl games to Orlando.

=== Side events ===
Commissioner Roger Goodell announced that the 2017 Pro Bowl would be a "week-long celebration for football and our fans"; a number of family-oriented side events was held at the Walt Disney World Resort and its ESPN Wide World of Sports Complex, including practices, a 5K run, youth events, and player appearances.

On December 12, 2016, the NFL announced that it would hold a series of skills competitions during Pro Bowl week at the Wide World of Sports Complex, known as the Pro Bowl Skills Showdown.

== Game format ==
On June 1, 2016, the NFL confirmed that the Pro Bowl would return to its previous, conference-based format for 2017, after three years of using a draft-based format with players selected by designated captains. The captains were former NFL players Jerome Bettis, Tony Gonzalez, Ray Lewis, and Charles Woodson.

=== Rule changes ===
The game format was nearly the same for 2017 as it had been in 2016, with some exceptions:

- Forty-four players were assigned to each team, up from 43 in 2016 (a regular game-day active roster has 46).
- The two-minute warning that was given in the first and third quarters (in addition to the second and fourth quarters) in previous years was eliminated, and the ball did not change hands after the first and third quarters.
- The coin toss determined which team was awarded possession first. There were no kickoffs; the ball was placed on the 25-yard line at the start of each half and after scoring plays.
- Defenses were now permitted to play cover two and press coverage. Prior to 2014, only man coverage was allowed, except for goal line situations.
- A 38-second/25-second play clock was used instead of the usual 40-second/25-second clock, and up from 35-second/25-second clock in 2016.
- Replay reviews will be allowed; previously there was replay in the Pro Bowl only when new equipment tests were being conducted.
- There are no intentional grounding rules.
- Only defensive ends and tackles may rush on passing plays, but those must be on the same side of the ball. The defense is not permitted to blitz.
- All blindside blocks and blocks below the waist are illegal.
- A tight end and running back must be in every formation.
- No more than two wide receivers on either side of the ball.
- Deep middle safety must be aligned inside the hash marks.

== Summary ==
=== Box score ===
2017 Pro Bowl: American Football Conference vs National Football Conference

Quarter	1	2	3	4	Total
AFC	0	14	3	3	20
NFC	0	7	0	6	13

at Camping World Stadium in Orlando, Florida

- Date: January 29, 2017
- Game time: 8:00 P.M. EST
- Game weather: 50 °F (10 °C), clear
- Game attendance: 60,834
- Referee: Jerome Boger
- TV announcers (ESPN): Sean McDonough, Jon Gruden, Lisa Salters
- Recap, Gamebook

Game information

First quarter

- No scoring plays

Second quarter

- AFC – Delanie Walker 26-yard pass from Alex Smith (Justin Tucker kick), 14:52. AFC 7–0. Drive: 5 plays, 56 yards, 2:09.
- NFC – Doug Baldwin 47-yard pass from Drew Brees (Matt Prater kick), 6:26. Tied 7–7. Drive: 4 plays, 58 yards, 1:31.
- AFC – Travis Kelce 12-yard pass from Andy Dalton (Justin Tucker kick), 1:40. AFC 14–7. Drive: 5 plays, 38 yards, 0:50.

Third quarter

- AFC – Justin Tucker 38-yard field goal, 7:29. AFC 17–7. Drive: 10 plays, 55 yards, 7:31.

Fourth quarter

- AFC – Justin Tucker 31-yard field goal, 14:12. AFC 20–7. Drive: 15 plays, 61 yards, 7:22.
- NFC – Matt Prater 42-yard field goal, 9:29. AFC 20–10. Drive: 9 plays, 51 yards, 4:43.
- NFC – Matt Prater 46-yard field goal, 4:29. AFC 20–13. Drive: 9 plays, 48 yards, 3:21.

Leading Passers

- AFC – Andy Dalton – 10/12, 100 yards, TD, INT
- NFC – Kirk Cousins – 14/20, 158 yards, INT

Leading rushers

- AFC – Jay Ajayi – 7 rushes, 18 yards
- NFC – Jordan Howard – 5 rushes, 21 yards

Leading receivers

- AFC – T. Y. Hilton – 5 receptions, 58 yards
- NFC – Odell Beckham Jr. – 6 receptions, 93 yards

== AFC rosters ==
The following players were selected to represent the AFC:

=== Offense ===
Position	Starter(s)	Reserve(s)	Alternate(s)
Quarterback	12 Tom Brady, New England^{[d]}	4 Derek Carr, Oakland^{[b]} 7 Ben Roethlisberger, Pittsburgh^{[b]}	11 Alex Smith, Kansas City^{[a]} 14 Andy Dalton, Cincinnati^{[a]} 17 Philip Rivers, San Diego^{[a]}
Running back	26 Le'Veon Bell, Pittsburgh^{[b]}	25 LeSean McCoy, Buffalo^{[b]} 29 DeMarco Murray, Tennessee	23 Jay Ajayi, Miami^{[a]} 28 Melvin Gordon, San Diego^{[a]}
Fullback	44 Kyle Juszczyk, Baltimore		
Wide receiver	84 Antonio Brown, Pittsburgh^{[b]} 89 Amari Cooper, Oakland^{[b]}	13 T. Y. Hilton, Indianapolis; 18 A. J. Green, Cincinnati^{[b]}	10 Emmanuel Sanders, Denver^{[a]} 14 Jarvis Landry, Miami^{[a]} 88 Demaryius Thomas, Denver^{[a]}
Tight end	87 Travis Kelce, Kansas City	82 Delanie Walker, Tennessee	
Offensive tackle	72 Donald Penn, Oakland^{[b]} 73 Joe Thomas, Cleveland	77 Taylor Lewan, Tennessee	77 Andrew Whitworth, Cincinnati^{[a]}
Offensive guard	70 Kelechi Osemele, Oakland; 73 Marshal Yanda, Baltimore^{[b]}	66 David DeCastro, Pittsburgh	64 Richie Incognito, Buffalo^{[a]}
Center	61 Rodney Hudson, Oakland	53 Maurkice Pouncey, Pittsburgh^{[b]}	53 Jeremy Zuttah, Baltimore^{[a]}

=== Defense ===
Position	Starter(s)	Reserve(s)	Alternate(s)
Defensive end	52 Khalil Mack, Oakland^{[b]} 91 Cameron Wake, Miami	90 Jadeveon Clowney, Houston^{[b]}	92 Leonard Williams, NY Jets^{[a]} 96 Carlos Dunlap, Cincinnati^{[a]}
Defensive tackle	93 Ndamukong Suh, Miami^{[b]} 97 Geno Atkins, Cincinnati	99 Jurrell Casey, Tennessee	95 Kyle Williams, Buffalo^{[a]}
Outside linebacker	57 Lorenzo Alexander, Buffalo; 58 Von Miller, Denver	98 Brian Orakpo, Tennessee	
Inside linebacker	54 Dont'a Hightower, New England^{[d]}	57 C. J. Mosley, Baltimore^{[b]}	53 Zach Brown, Buffalo^{[a]} 50 Ryan Shazier, Pittsburgh^{[a]}
Cornerback	21 Aqib Talib, Denver; 22 Marcus Peters, Kansas City^{[b]}	25 Chris Harris Jr., Denver; 26 Casey Hayward, San Diego	24 Stephon Gilmore, Buffalo^{[a]}
Free safety	32 Devin McCourty, New England^{[d]}	27 Reggie Nelson, Oakland	32 Eric Weddle, Baltimore^{[a]}
Strong safety	29 Eric Berry, Kansas City^{[b]}		26 Darian Stewart, Denver^{[a]}

=== Special teams ===
Position	Starter	Alternate(s)
Punter	1 Pat McAfee, Indianapolis^{[b]}	2 Dustin Colquitt, Kansas City^{[a]}
Placekicker	9 Justin Tucker, Baltimore	
Return specialist	10 Tyreek Hill, Kansas City	
Special teamer	18 Matthew Slater, New England^{[d]}	57 D. J. Alexander, Kansas City^{[a]}
Long snapper	46 Morgan Cox, Baltimore	

== NFC rosters ==
The following players were selected to represent the NFC:

=== Offense ===
Position	Starter(s)	Reserve(s)	Alternate(s)
Quarterback	2 Matt Ryan, Atlanta^{[d]}	4 Dak Prescott, Dallas; 12 Aaron Rodgers, Green Bay^{[b]}	8 Kirk Cousins, Washington^{[a]} 9 Drew Brees, New Orleans^{[a]}
Running back	21 Ezekiel Elliott, Dallas	24 Devonta Freeman, Atlanta^{[d]} 31 David Johnson, Arizona^{[b]}	24 Jordan Howard, Chicago^{[a]} 43 Darren Sproles, Philadelphia^{[a]}
Fullback	35 Mike Tolbert, Carolina		
Wide receiver	11 Julio Jones, Atlanta^{[d]} 13 Odell Beckham Jr., NY Giants	11 Larry Fitzgerald, Arizona^{[b]} 13 Mike Evans, Tampa Bay	88 Dez Bryant, Dallas^{[a]} 89 Doug Baldwin, Seattle^{[a]}
Tight end	88 Greg Olsen, Carolina	86 Jordan Reed, Washington^{[b]}	88 Jimmy Graham, Seattle^{[a]}
Offensive tackle	71 Trent Williams, Washington; 77 Tyron Smith, Dallas	71 Jason Peters, Philadelphia^{[b]}	69 David Bakhtiari, Green Bay^{[a]}
Offensive guard	70 Zack Martin, Dallas; 75 Brandon Scherff, Washington ^{[b]}	70 T. J. Lang, Green Bay^{[b]}	70 Trai Turner, Carolina^{[a]} 71 Josh Sitton, Chicago^{[a]}
Center	72 Travis Frederick, Dallas	51 Alex Mack, Atlanta^{[d]}	62 Jason Kelce, Philadelphia^{[a]}

=== Defense ===
Position	Starter(s)	Reserve(s)	Alternate(s)
Defensive end	56 Cliff Avril, Seattle; 97 Everson Griffen, Minnesota	72 Michael Bennett, Seattle	
Defensive tackle	93 Gerald McCoy, Tampa Bay; 99 Aaron Donald, Los Angeles^{[b]}	91 Fletcher Cox, Philadelphia	98 Linval Joseph, Minnesota^{[a]}
Outside linebacker	44 Vic Beasley, Atlanta^{[d]} 91 Ryan Kerrigan, Washington^{[b]}	58 Thomas Davis Sr., Carolina	50 K. J. Wright, Seattle^{[a]} 55 Anthony Barr, Minnesota^{[a]}
Inside linebacker	54 Bobby Wagner, Seattle	59 Luke Kuechly, Carolina^{[b]}	50 Sean Lee, Dallas^{[a]}
Cornerback	20 Janoris Jenkins, NY Giants; 21 Patrick Peterson, Arizona	25 Richard Sherman, Seattle; 29 Xavier Rhodes, Minnesota	
Free safety	22 Harrison Smith, Minnesota	21 Ha Ha Clinton-Dix, Green Bay	
Strong safety	21 Landon Collins, NY Giants		

=== Special teams ===
Position	Starter	Alternate(s)
Punter	6 Johnny Hekker, Los Angeles	
Placekicker	3 Matt Bryant, Atlanta^{[d]}	5 Matt Prater, Detroit^{[a]}
Return specialist	84 Cordarrelle Patterson, Minnesota	
Special teamer	17 Dwayne Harris, NY Giants	
Long snapper	44 Jake McQuaide, Los Angeles	

Notes:

bold player who participated in game
^{a} Replacement selection due to injury or vacancy
^{b} Injured player; selected but will not play
^{c} Replacement starter; selected as reserve
^{d} Selected but did not play because his team advanced to Super Bowl LI (see Pro Bowl "Player Selection" section)
^{e} Players must have accepted their invitations as alternates to be listed; those who declined, such as Tyrod Taylor, are not considered Pro Bowlers

== Number of selections per team ==
American Football Conference
Team	Selections
Baltimore Ravens	7
Kansas City Chiefs	7
Oakland Raiders	7
Buffalo Bills	6
Denver Broncos	6
Pittsburgh Steelers	6
Cincinnati Bengals	5
Tennessee Titans	5
Miami Dolphins	4
New England Patriots	4
San Diego Chargers	3
Indianapolis Colts	2
Cleveland Browns	1
Houston Texans	1
New York Jets	1
Jacksonville Jaguars	0

National Football Conference
Team	Selections
Dallas Cowboys	7
Seattle Seahawks	7
Atlanta Falcons	6
Minnesota Vikings	6
Carolina Panthers	5
Washington Redskins	5
Green Bay Packers	4
New York Giants	4
Philadelphia Eagles	4
Arizona Cardinals	3
Los Angeles Rams	3
Chicago Bears	2
Tampa Bay Buccaneers	2
Detroit Lions	1
New Orleans Saints	1
San Francisco 49ers	0

== Broadcasting ==
The game was televised nationally by ESPN and broadcast via radio by Westwood One.
