= NFL Top 100 Players of 2013 =

- Season 2013
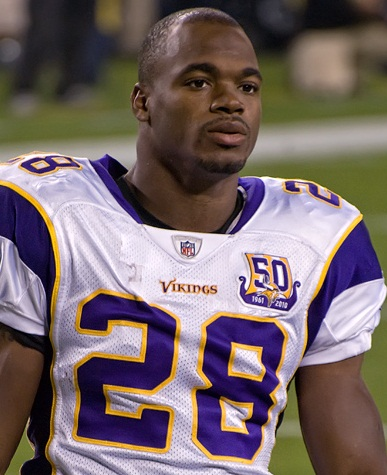
- Adrian Peterson, the #1 ranked player
- No. of episodes: 11

Release
- Original network: NFL Network
- Original release: April 27 – June 27, 2013

Season chronology
- ← Previous; 2012 Next → 2014

The NFL Top 100 Players of 2013 was the third season in the NFL Top 100 series. It ended with reigning NFL MVP Adrian Peterson being ranked #1, while Super Bowl MVP Joe Flacco was ranked #19. 3 teams ended up with no players on the list: New York Jets, Oakland Raiders, St. Louis Rams.

== Episode list ==
Episode No.	Air date	Numbers revealed
1	April 27	100–91
2	May 4	90–81
3	May 11	80–71
4	May 18	70–61
5	May 25	60–51
6	June 1	50–41
7	June 8	40–31
8	June 15	30–21
9	June 22	20–11
10	June 29	10–6
11	June 29	5–1

== The list ==
Rank	Player	Position	2012 team	2013 team	Rank change	Reference
1	Adrian Peterson	Running back	Minnesota Vikings		▲7	1
2	Peyton Manning	Quarterback	Denver Broncos		▲48	2
3	Calvin Johnson	Wide receiver	Detroit Lions		0	3
4	Tom Brady	Quarterback	New England Patriots		0	4
5	J. J. Watt	Defensive end	Houston Texans		NR	5
6	Aaron Rodgers	Quarterback	Green Bay Packers		▼5	6
7	Aldon Smith	Linebacker	San Francisco 49ers		NR	7
8	Arian Foster	Running back	Houston Texans		▲17	8
9	Von Miller	Linebacker	Denver Broncos		▲43	9
10	Patrick Willis	Linebacker	San Francisco 49ers		0	10
11	Drew Brees	Quarterback	New Orleans Saints		▼9	11
12	DeMarcus Ware	Linebacker	Dallas Cowboys		▼6	12
13	Ray Rice	Running back	Baltimore Ravens		▲9	13
14	Andre Johnson	Wide receiver	Houston Texans		▲1	14
15	Robert Griffin III	Quarterback	Washington Redskins		NR	15
16	A. J. Green	Wide receiver	Cincinnati Bengals		▲61	16
17	Matt Ryan	Quarterback	Atlanta Falcons		NR	17
18	Ed Reed	Safety	Baltimore Ravens	Houston Texans / New York Jets	▼2	18
19	Joe Flacco	Quarterback	Baltimore Ravens		▲55	19
20	Jamaal Charles	Running back	Kansas City Chiefs		NR	20
21	Reggie Wayne	Wide receiver	Indianapolis Colts		NR	21
22	Larry Fitzgerald	Wide receiver	Arizona Cardinals		▼15	22
23	Andrew Luck	Quarterback	Indianapolis Colts		NR	23
24	Marshawn Lynch	Running back	Seattle Seahawks		▲70	24
25	Rob Gronkowski	Tight end	New England Patriots		▼4	25
26	Julio Jones	Wide receiver	Atlanta Falcons		NR	26
27	Brandon Marshall	Wide receiver	Chicago Bears		NR	27
28	Joe Thomas	Offensive tackle	Cleveland Browns		▲54	28
29	Justin Smith	Defensive end	San Francisco 49ers		▼12	29
30	Vince Wilfork	Defensive tackle	New England Patriots		▲51	30
31	Clay Matthews	Linebacker	Green Bay Packers		▼4	31
32	Frank Gore	Running back	San Francisco 49ers		▼4	32
33	Patrick Peterson	Cornerback	Arizona Cardinals		▲22	33
34	Charles Tillman	Cornerback	Chicago Bears		NR	34
35	Dez Bryant	Wide receiver	Dallas Cowboys		NR	35
36	Geno Atkins	Defensive tackle	Cincinnati Bengals		NR	36
37	NaVorro Bowman	Linebacker	San Francisco 49ers		▲48	37
38	Vernon Davis	Tight end	San Francisco 49ers		▲5	38
39	Roddy White	Wide receiver	Atlanta Falcons		▲26	39
40	Ndamukong Suh	Defensive tackle	Detroit Lions		▼2	40
41	Jason Witten	Tight end	Dallas Cowboys		▲34	41
42	Haloti Ngata	Defensive tackle	Baltimore Ravens		▼33	42
43	Eli Manning	Quarterback	New York Giants		▼12	43
44	Wes Welker	Wide receiver	New England Patriots	Denver Broncos	▼21	44
45	LeSean McCoy	Running back	Philadelphia Eagles		▼27	45
46	Cam Newton	Quarterback	Carolina Panthers		▼6	46
47	Tony Gonzalez	Tight end	Atlanta Falcons		▲6	47
48	Duane Brown	Offensive tackle	Houston Texans		NR	48
49	Justin Houston	Linebacker	Kansas City Chiefs		NR	49
50	Richard Sherman	Cornerback	Seattle Seahawks		NR	50
51	Russell Wilson	Quarterback	Seattle Seahawks		NR	51
52	Vincent Jackson	Wide receiver	Tampa Bay Buccaneers		NR	52
53	Champ Bailey	Cornerback	Denver Broncos		▼7	53
54	Julius Peppers	Defensive end	Chicago Bears		▼28	54
55	Jason Pierre-Paul	Defensive end	New York Giants		▼31	55
56	Terrell Suggs	Linebacker	Baltimore Ravens		▼45	56
57	Doug Martin	Running back	Tampa Bay Buccaneers		NR	57
58	Victor Cruz	Wide receiver	New York Giants		▼19	58
59	Derrick Johnson	Linebacker	Kansas City Chiefs		▲19	59
60	Jared Allen	Defensive end	Minnesota Vikings		▼47	60
61	Ben Roethlisberger	Quarterback	Pittsburgh Steelers		▼31	61
62	Chris Johnson	Running back	Tennessee Titans		▲38	62
63	Stephen Tulloch	Linebacker	Detroit Lions		NR	63
64	Alfred Morris	Running back	Washington Redskins		NR	64
65	Dwayne Bowe	Wide receiver	Kansas City Chiefs		NR	65
66	Earl Thomas	Safety	Seattle Seahawks		0	66
67	Darrelle Revis	Cornerback	New York Jets	Tampa Bay Buccaneers	▼62	67
68	Demaryius Thomas	Wide receiver	Denver Broncos		NR	68
69	Tim Jennings	Cornerback	Chicago Bears		NR	69
70	Chad Greenway	Linebacker	Minnesota Vikings		NR	70
71	Trent Richardson	Running back	Cleveland Browns	Cleveland Browns / Indianapolis Colts	NR	71
72	Mario Williams	Defensive end	Buffalo Bills		NR	72
73	Antonio Gates	Tight end	San Diego Chargers		NR	73
74	Robert Mathis	Defensive end	Indianapolis Colts		NR	74
75	Brandon Flowers	Cornerback	Kansas City Chiefs		NR	75
76	Matthew Stafford	Quarterback	Detroit Lions		▼35	76
77	Aaron Hernandez	Tight end	New England Patriots	None	NR	77
78	Joe Staley	Offensive tackle	San Francisco 49ers		▼11	78
79	Luke Kuechly	Linebacker	Carolina Panthers		NR	79
80	Dwight Freeney	Defensive end	Indianapolis Colts	San Diego Chargers	▲9	80
81	Colin Kaepernick	Quarterback	San Francisco 49ers		NR	81
82	Logan Mankins	Guard	New England Patriots		▼18	82
83	Lance Briggs	Linebacker	Chicago Bears		▼11	83
84	Steve Smith	Wide receiver	Carolina Panthers		▼49	84
85	Charles Woodson	Cornerback	Green Bay Packers	Oakland Raiders	▼49	85
86	London Fletcher	Linebacker	Washington Redskins		▲1	86
87	Bernard Pollard	Safety	Baltimore Ravens	Tennessee Titans	NR	87
88	Jacoby Jones	Wide receiver	Baltimore Ravens		NR	88
89	Cameron Wake	Linebacker	Miami Dolphins		NR	89
90	Percy Harvin	Wide receiver	Minnesota Vikings	Seattle Seahawks	NR	90
91	Troy Polamalu	Safety	Pittsburgh Steelers		▼72	91
92	Gerald McCoy	Defensive tackle	Tampa Bay Buccaneers		NR	92
93	Anquan Boldin	Wide receiver	Baltimore Ravens	San Francisco 49ers	NR	93
94	Daryl Washington	Linebacker	Arizona Cardinals		NR	94
95	Max Unger	Center	Seattle Seahawks		NR	95
96	Dashon Goldson	Safety	San Francisco 49ers	Tampa Bay Buccaneers	NR	96
97	Heath Miller	Tight end	Pittsburgh Steelers		NR	97
98	Maurice Jones-Drew	Running back	Jacksonville Jaguars		▼86	98
99	Trent Williams	Offensive tackle	Washington Redskins		NR	99
100	Dennis Pitta	Tight end	Baltimore Ravens		NR	100
