= NFL Top 100 Players of 2015 =

- Season 2015
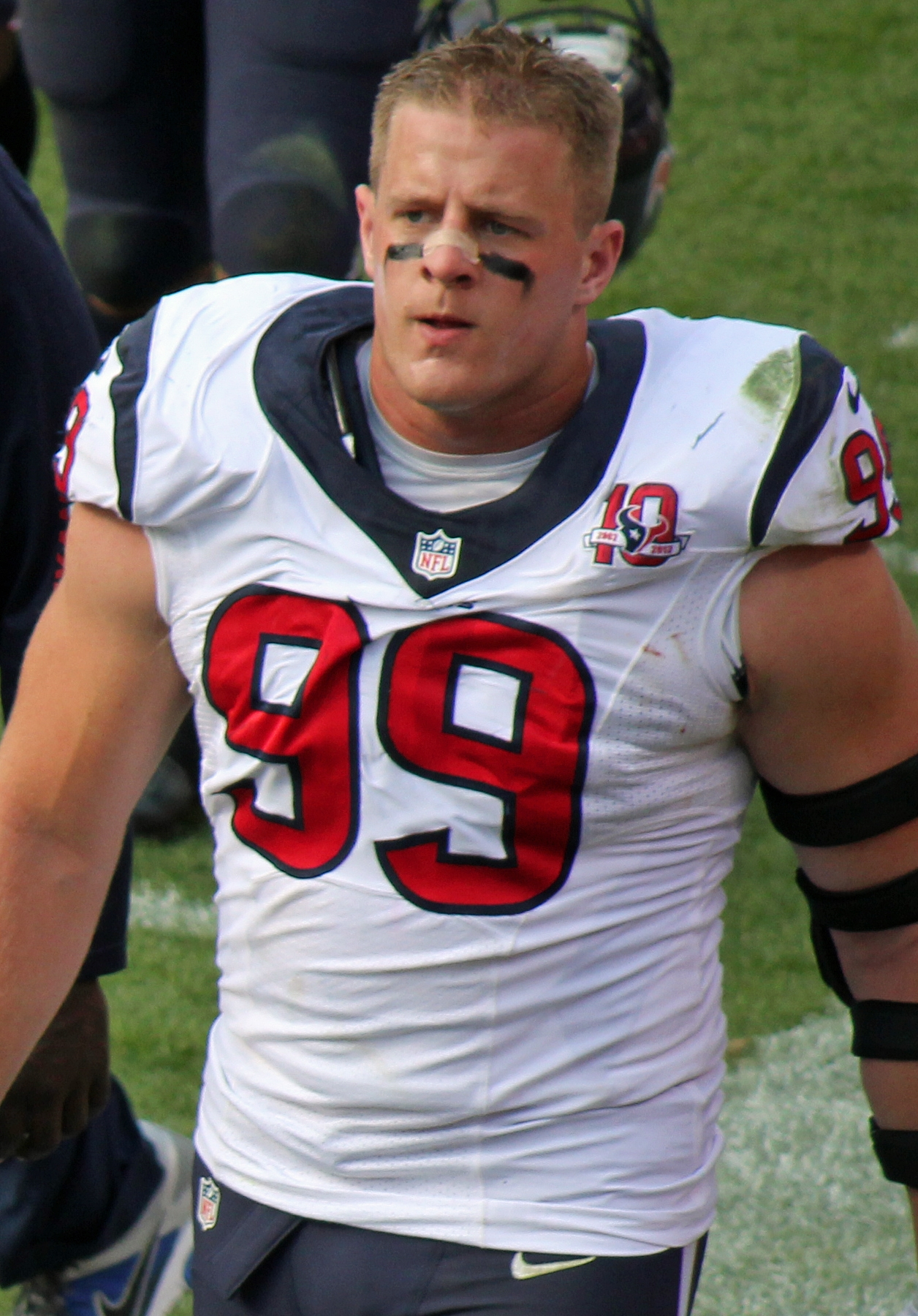
- J. J. Watt, the #1 ranked player
- No. of episodes: 11

Release
- Original network: NFL Network
- Original release: May 6 – July 8, 2015

Season chronology
- ← Previous; 2014 Next → 2016

The NFL Top 100 Players of 2015 was the fifth season in the NFL Top 100 series. It ended with reigning NFL Defensive Player of the Year J. J. Watt being ranked #1, thus marking the first year in the history of the countdown that the reigning NFL MVP was not ranked #1 (Aaron Rodgers was ranked #2). Super Bowl MVP Tom Brady was ranked #3. The San Francisco 49ers were the only team with no players on the list.

== Episode list ==
| Episode No. | Air date | Numbers revealed |
|---|---|---|
| 1 | May 6 | 100–91 |
| 2 | May 13 | 90–81 |
| 3 | May 20 | 80–71 |
| 4 | May 27 | 70–61 |
| 5 | June 3 | 60–51 |
| 6 | June 10 | 50–41 |
| 7 | June 17 | 40–31 |
| 8 | June 24 | 30–21 |
| 9 | July 1 | 20–11 |
| 10 | July 8 | 10–6 |
| 11 | July 8 | 5–1 |

== The list ==
| Rank | Player | Position | 2014 team | 2015 team | Rank change | Reference |
|---|---|---|---|---|---|---|
| 1 | J. J. Watt | Defensive end | Houston Texans | | ▲11 | 1 |
| 2 | Aaron Rodgers | Quarterback | Green Bay Packers | | ▲9 | 2 |
| 3 | Tom Brady | Quarterback | New England Patriots | | 0 | 3 |
| 4 | DeMarco Murray | Running back | Dallas Cowboys | Philadelphia Eagles | ▲83 | 4 |
| 5 | Peyton Manning | Quarterback | Denver Broncos | | ▼4 | 5 |
| 6 | Calvin Johnson | Wide receiver | Detroit Lions | | ▼4 | 6 |
| 7 | Andrew Luck | Quarterback | Indianapolis Colts | | ▲23 | 7 |
| 8 | Antonio Brown | Wide receiver | Pittsburgh Steelers | | ▲15 | 8 |
| 9 | Marshawn Lynch | Running back | Seattle Seahawks | | ▲5 | 9 |
| 10 | Rob Gronkowski | Tight end | New England Patriots | | ▲31 | 10 |
| 11 | Richard Sherman | Cornerback | Seattle Seahawks | | ▼4 | 11 |
| 12 | Jamaal Charles | Running back | Kansas City Chiefs | | ▼4 | 12 |
| 13 | Julio Jones | Wide receiver | Atlanta Falcons | | NR | 13 |
| 14 | Luke Kuechly | Linebacker | Carolina Panthers | | ▲1 | 14 |
| 15 | Dez Bryant | Wide receiver | Dallas Cowboys | | ▲10 | 15 |
| 16 | Le'Veon Bell | Running back | Pittsburgh Steelers | | NR | 16 |
| 17 | Darrelle Revis | Cornerback | New England Patriots | New York Jets | ▲20 | 17 |
| 18 | Jordy Nelson | Wide receiver | Green Bay Packers | | ▲65 | 18 |
| 19 | Patrick Peterson | Cornerback | Arizona Cardinals | | ▲3 | 19 |
| 20 | Demaryius Thomas | Wide receiver | Denver Broncos | | ▲29 | 20 |
| 21 | Earl Thomas | Safety | Seattle Seahawks | | ▼4 | 21 |
| 22 | Russell Wilson | Quarterback | Seattle Seahawks | | ▼2 | 22 |
| 23 | Joe Haden | Cornerback | Cleveland Browns | | ▲16 | 23 |
| 24 | Ndamukong Suh | Defensive tackle | Detroit Lions | Miami Dolphins | ▲16 | 24 |
| 25 | Joe Thomas | Offensive tackle | Cleveland Browns | | ▼7 | 25 |
| 26 | Ben Roethlisberger | Quarterback | Pittsburgh Steelers | | ▲5 | 26 |
| 27 | Justin Houston | Linebacker | Kansas City Chiefs | | ▲30 | 27 |
| 28 | Gerald McCoy | Defensive tackle | Tampa Bay Buccaneers | | 0 | 28 |
| 29 | LeSean McCoy | Running back | Philadelphia Eagles | Buffalo Bills | ▼24 | 29 |
| 30 | Drew Brees | Quarterback | New Orleans Saints | | ▼24 | 30 |
| 31 | Jimmy Graham | Tight end | New Orleans Saints | Seattle Seahawks | ▼21 | 31 |
| 32 | Odell Beckham Jr. | Wide receiver | New York Giants | | NR | 32 |
| 33 | Von Miller | Linebacker | Denver Broncos | | ▲43 | 33 |
| 34 | Tony Romo | Quarterback | Dallas Cowboys | | ▲37 | 34 |
| 35 | T. Y. Hilton | Wide receiver | Indianapolis Colts | | NR | 35 |
| 36 | Tyron Smith | Offensive tackle | Dallas Cowboys | | ▲42 | 36 |
| 37 | A. J. Green | Wide receiver | Cincinnati Bengals | | ▼28 | 37 |
| 38 | Brent Grimes | Cornerback | Miami Dolphins | | ▲57 | 38 |
| 39 | Cameron Wake | Defensive end | Miami Dolphins | | ▲27 | 39 |
| 40 | Jason Peters | Offensive tackle | Philadelphia Eagles | | ▲27 | 40 |
| 41 | Kam Chancellor | Safety | Seattle Seahawks | | ▲24 | 41 |
| 42 | Mario Williams | Defensive end | Buffalo Bills | | ▼13 | 42 |
| 43 | Philip Rivers | Quarterback | San Diego Chargers | | ▼9 | 43 |
| 44 | Robert Quinn | Defensive end | St. Louis Rams | | ▼31 | 44 |
| 45 | Julius Thomas | Tight end | Denver Broncos | Jacksonville Jaguars | NR | 45 |
| 46 | Elvis Dumervil | Linebacker | Baltimore Ravens | | NR | 46 |
| 47 | Trent Williams | Offensive tackle | Washington Redskins | | ▲13 | 47 |
| 48 | Matt Forte | Running back | Chicago Bears | | ▲43 | 48 |
| 49 | Khalil Mack | Linebacker | Oakland Raiders | | NR | 49 |
| 50 | DeSean Jackson | Wide receiver | Washington Redskins | | ▲13 | 50 |
| 51 | Clay Matthews | Linebacker | Green Bay Packers | | ▲26 | 51 |
| 52 | Antonio Gates | Tight end | San Diego Chargers | | NR | 52 |
| 53 | Marcell Dareus | Defensive tackle | Buffalo Bills | | ▲9 | 53 |
| 54 | Steve Smith | Wide receiver | Baltimore Ravens | | NR | 54 |
| 55 | Sheldon Richardson | Defensive end | New York Jets | | ▲39 | 55 |
| 56 | Lavonte David | Linebacker | Tampa Bay Buccaneers | | ▼21 | 56 |
| 57 | Brandon Marshall | Wide receiver | Chicago Bears | New York Jets | ▼21 | 57 |
| 58 | Connor Barwin | Linebacker | Philadelphia Eagles | | NR | 58 |
| 59 | Vontae Davis | Cornerback | Indianapolis Colts | | NR | 59 |
| 60 | Eddie Lacy | Running back | Green Bay Packers | | ▲30 | 60 |
| 61 | Jeremy Maclin | Wide receiver | Philadelphia Eagles | Kansas City Chiefs | NR | 61 |
| 62 | Adrian Peterson | Running back | Minnesota Vikings | | ▼58 | 62 |
| 63 | Jerry Hughes | Defensive end | Buffalo Bills | | NR | 63 |
| 64 | Charles Woodson | Safety | Oakland Raiders | | NR | 64 |
| 65 | Justin Forsett | Running back | Baltimore Ravens | | NR | 65 |
| 66 | DeAndre Levy | Linebacker | Detroit Lions | | ▼7 | 66 |
| 67 | Tashaun Gipson | Safety | Cleveland Browns | | NR | 67 |
| 68 | Larry Fitzgerald | Wide receiver | Arizona Cardinals | | ▼30 | 68 |
| 69 | Bobby Wagner | Linebacker | Seattle Seahawks | | NR | 69 |
| 70 | Tamba Hali | Linebacker | Kansas City Chiefs | | ▼27 | 70 |
| 71 | Julius Peppers | Linebacker | Green Bay Packers | | NR | 71 |
| 72 | Kyle Williams | Defensive tackle | Buffalo Bills | | ▼40 | 72 |
| 73 | Cam Newton | Quarterback | Carolina Panthers | | ▼49 | 73 |
| 74 | Muhammad Wilkerson | Defensive end | New York Jets | | ▼32 | 74 |
| 75 | Mike Evans | Wide receiver | Tampa Bay Buccaneers | | NR | 75 |
| 76 | Sen'Derrick Marks | Defensive tackle | Jacksonville Jaguars | | NR | 76 |
| 77 | Matt Ryan | Quarterback | Atlanta Falcons | | NR | 77 |
| 78 | Ryan Kerrigan | Linebacker | Washington Redskins | | NR | 78 |
| 79 | Marshal Yanda | Guard | Baltimore Ravens | | ▼24 | 79 |
| 80 | Arian Foster | Running back | Houston Texans | | NR | 80 |
| 81 | Darren Sproles | Running back | Philadelphia Eagles | | NR | 81 |
| 82 | Haloti Ngata | Defensive tackle | Baltimore Ravens | Detroit Lions | ▼37 | 82 |
| 83 | Maurkice Pouncey | Center | Pittsburgh Steelers | | NR | 83 |
| 84 | Terrell Suggs | Linebacker | Baltimore Ravens | | ▼58 | 84 |
| 85 | Golden Tate | Wide receiver | Detroit Lions | | NR | 85 |
| 86 | Eric Weddle | Safety | San Diego Chargers | | ▲6 | 86 |
| 87 | DeMarcus Ware | Linebacker | Denver Broncos | | ▼31 | 87 |
| 88 | Glover Quin | Safety | Detroit Lions | | NR | 88 |
| 89 | Greg Olsen | Tight end | Carolina Panthers | | NR | 89 |
| 90 | Michael Bennett | Defensive end | Seattle Seahawks | | NR | 90 |
| 91 | Julian Edelman | Wide receiver | New England Patriots | | NR | 91 |
| 92 | Aaron Donald | Defensive tackle | St. Louis Rams | | NR | 92 |
| 93 | Jason Witten | Tight end | Dallas Cowboys | | ▲5 | 93 |
| 94 | C. J. Mosley | Linebacker | Baltimore Ravens | | NR | 94 |
| 95 | Emmanuel Sanders | Wide receiver | Denver Broncos | | NR | 95 |
| 96 | Jurrell Casey | Defensive end | Tennessee Titans | | NR | 96 |
| 97 | Joe Flacco | Quarterback | Baltimore Ravens | | ▼39 | 97 |
| 98 | Adam Vinatieri | Kicker | Indianapolis Colts | | NR | 98 |
| 99 | Calais Campbell | Defensive end | Arizona Cardinals | | NR | 99 |
| 100 | Randall Cobb | Wide receiver | Green Bay Packers | | NR | 100 |
