= NFL Top 100 Players of 2014 =

- Season 2014
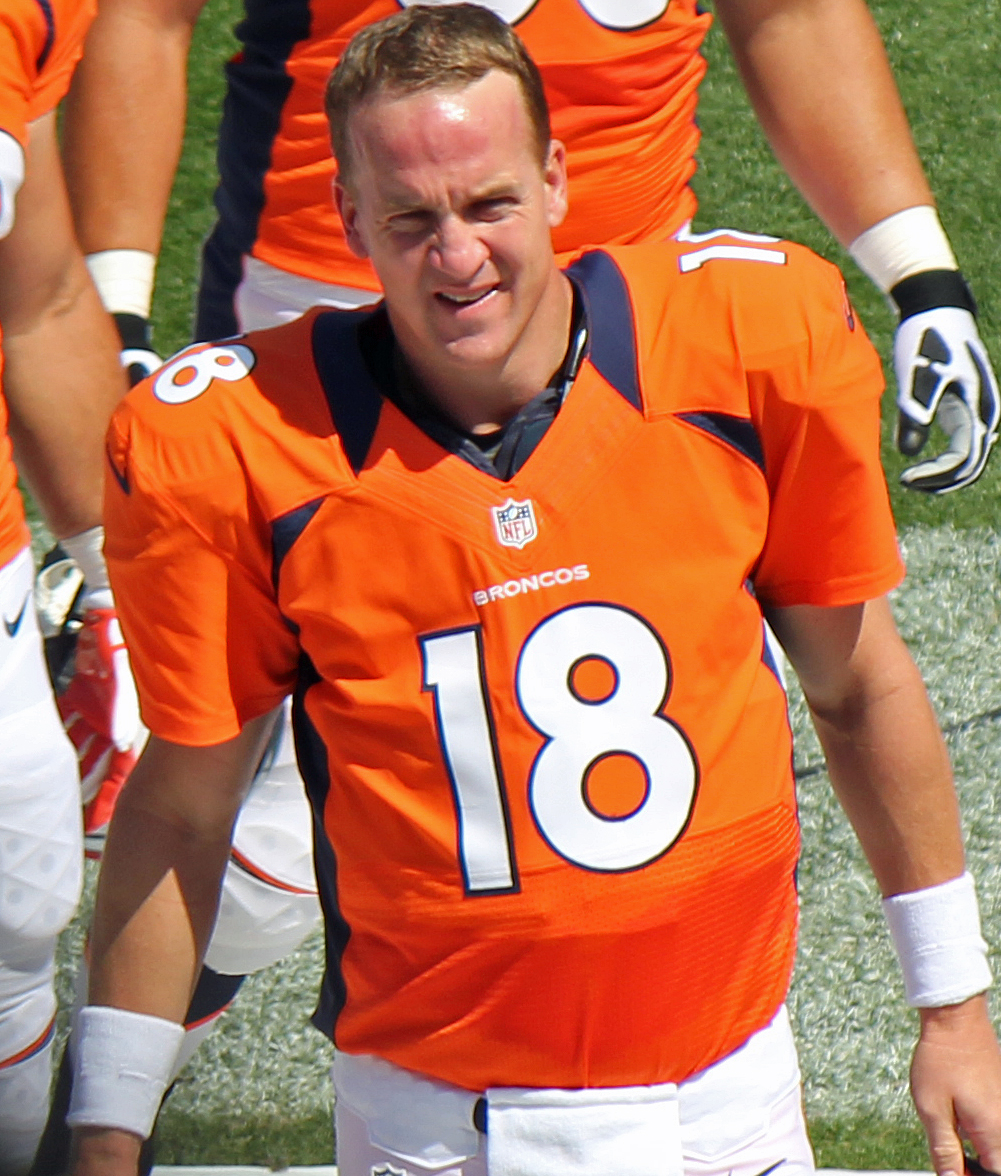
- Peyton Manning, the #1 ranked player
- No. of episodes: 11

Release
- Original network: NFL Network
- Original release: May 10 – July 9, 2014

Season chronology
- ← Previous; 2013 Next → 2015

The NFL Top 100 Players of 2014 was the fourth season in the NFL Top 100 series. It ended with reigning NFL MVP Peyton Manning being ranked No.1, while Super Bowl MVP Malcolm Smith was not ranked on the list. 4 teams ended up with no players on the list: Atlanta Falcons, Jacksonville Jaguars, Oakland Raiders, Tennessee Titans.

== Episode list ==
Episode No.	Air date	Numbers revealed
1	May 10	100–91
2	May 17	90–81
3	May 24	80–71
4	May 31	70–61
5	June 7	60–51
6	June 14	50–41
7	June 21	40–31
8	June 28	30–21
9	July 5	20–11
10	July 12	10–6
11	July 12	5–1

== The list ==
Rank	Player	Position	2013 team	2014 team	Rank change	Reference
1	Peyton Manning	Quarterback	Denver Broncos		▲1	1
2	Calvin Johnson	Wide receiver	Detroit Lions		▲1	2
3	Tom Brady	Quarterback	New England Patriots		▲1	3
4	Adrian Peterson	Running back	Minnesota Vikings		▼3	4
5	LeSean McCoy	Running back	Philadelphia Eagles		▲40	5
6	Drew Brees	Quarterback	New Orleans Saints		▲5	6
7	Richard Sherman	Cornerback	Seattle Seahawks		▲43	7
8	Jamaal Charles	Running back	Kansas City Chiefs		▲12	8
9	A. J. Green	Wide receiver	Cincinnati Bengals		▲7	9
10	Jimmy Graham	Tight end	New Orleans Saints		NR	10
11	Aaron Rodgers	Quarterback	Green Bay Packers		▼5	11
12	J. J. Watt	Defensive end	Houston Texans		▼7	12
13	Robert Quinn	Defensive end	St. Louis Rams		NR	13
14	Marshawn Lynch	Running back	Seattle Seahawks		▲10	14
15	Luke Kuechly	Linebacker	Carolina Panthers		▲64	15
16	Josh Gordon	Wide receiver	Cleveland Browns		NR	16
17	Earl Thomas	Safety	Seattle Seahawks		▲49	17
18	Joe Thomas	Offensive tackle	Cleveland Browns		▲10	18
19	Robert Mathis	Linebacker	Indianapolis Colts		▲55	19
20	Russell Wilson	Quarterback	Seattle Seahawks		▲31	20
21	Andre Johnson	Wide receiver	Houston Texans		▼7	21
22	Patrick Peterson	Cornerback	Arizona Cardinals		▲11	22
23	Antonio Brown	Wide receiver	Pittsburgh Steelers		NR	23
24	Cam Newton	Quarterback	Carolina Panthers		▲22	24
25	Dez Bryant	Wide receiver	Dallas Cowboys		▲10	25
26	Terrell Suggs	Linebacker	Baltimore Ravens		▲30	26
27	Patrick Willis	Linebacker	San Francisco 49ers		▼17	27
28	Gerald McCoy	Defensive tackle	Tampa Bay Buccaneers		▲64	28
29	Mario Williams	Defensive end	Buffalo Bills		▲43	29
30	Andrew Luck	Quarterback	Indianapolis Colts		▼7	30
31	Ben Roethlisberger	Quarterback	Pittsburgh Steelers		▲30	31
32	Kyle Williams	Defensive tackle	Buffalo Bills		NR	32
33	Aldon Smith	Linebacker	San Francisco 49ers		▼26	33
34	Philip Rivers	Quarterback	San Diego Chargers		NR	34
35	Lavonte David	Linebacker	Tampa Bay Buccaneers		NR	35
36	Brandon Marshall	Wide receiver	Chicago Bears		▼9	36
37	Darrelle Revis	Cornerback	Tampa Bay Buccaneers	New England Patriots	▲30	37
38	Larry Fitzgerald	Wide receiver	Arizona Cardinals		▼16	38
39	Joe Haden	Cornerback	Cleveland Browns		NR	39
40	Ndamukong Suh	Defensive tackle	Detroit Lions		0	40
41	Rob Gronkowski	Tight end	New England Patriots		▼16	41
42	Muhammad Wilkerson	Defensive end	New York Jets		NR	42
43	Tamba Hali	Linebacker	Kansas City Chiefs		NR	43
44	Vincent Jackson	Wide receiver	Tampa Bay Buccaneers		▲8	44
45	Haloti Ngata	Defensive tackle	Baltimore Ravens		▼3	45
46	Frank Gore	Running back	San Francisco 49ers		▼14	46
47	NaVorro Bowman	Linebacker	San Francisco 49ers		▼10	47
48	Geno Atkins	Defensive tackle	Cincinnati Bengals		▼12	48
49	Demaryius Thomas	Wide receiver	Denver Broncos		▲19	49
50	Eric Berry	Safety	Kansas City Chiefs		NR	50
51	Vernon Davis	Tight end	San Francisco 49ers		▼13	51
52	Vontaze Burfict	Linebacker	Cincinnati Bengals		NR	52
53	Greg Hardy	Defensive end	Carolina Panthers		NR	53
54	Alshon Jeffery	Wide receiver	Chicago Bears		NR	54
55	Marshal Yanda	Guard	Baltimore Ravens		NR	55
56	DeMarcus Ware	Linebacker	Dallas Cowboys	Denver Broncos	▼44	56
57	Justin Houston	Linebacker	Kansas City Chiefs		▼8	57
58	Joe Flacco	Quarterback	Baltimore Ravens		▼39	58
59	DeAndre Levy	Linebacker	Detroit Lions		NR	59
60	Trent Williams	Offensive tackle	Washington Redskins		▲39	60
61	Troy Polamalu	Safety	Pittsburgh Steelers		▲30	61
62	Marcell Dareus	Defensive tackle	Buffalo Bills		NR	62
63	DeSean Jackson	Wide receiver	Philadelphia Eagles	Washington Redskins	NR	63
64	Derrick Johnson	Linebacker	Kansas City Chiefs		▼5	64
65	Kam Chancellor	Safety	Seattle Seahawks		NR	65
66	Cameron Wake	Defensive end	Miami Dolphins		▲23	66
67	Jason Peters	Offensive tackle	Philadelphia Eagles		NR	67
68	Jared Allen	Defensive end	Minnesota Vikings	Chicago Bears	▼8	68
69	Justin Smith	Defensive end	San Francisco 49ers		▼40	69
70	Nick Foles	Quarterback	Philadelphia Eagles		NR	70
71	Tony Romo	Quarterback	Dallas Cowboys		NR	71
72	Antrel Rolle	Safety	New York Giants		NR	72
73	Wes Welker	Wide receiver	Denver Broncos		▼29	73
74	Tim Jennings	Cornerback	Chicago Bears		▼5	74
75	Joe Staley	Offensive tackle	San Francisco 49ers		▲3	75
76	Von Miller	Linebacker	Denver Broncos		▼67	76
77	Clay Matthews	Linebacker	Green Bay Packers		▼46	77
78	Tyron Smith	Offensive tackle	Dallas Cowboys		NR	78
79	Aqib Talib	Cornerback	New England Patriots	Denver Broncos	NR	79
80	Pierre Garçon	Wide receiver	Washington Redskins		NR	80
81	Colin Kaepernick	Quarterback	San Francisco 49ers		0	81
82	T. J. Ward	Safety	Cleveland Browns	Denver Broncos	NR	82
83	Jordy Nelson	Wide receiver	Green Bay Packers		NR	83
84	Kiko Alonso	Linebacker	Buffalo Bills		NR	84
85	Reggie Bush	Running back	Detroit Lions		NR	85
86	Duane Brown	Offensive tackle	Houston Texans		▼38	86
87	DeMarco Murray	Running back	Dallas Cowboys		NR	87
88	Evan Mathis	Guard	Philadelphia Eagles		NR	88
89	Charles Clay	Tight end	Miami Dolphins		NR	89
90	Eddie Lacy	Running back	Green Bay Packers		NR	90
91	Matt Forte	Running back	Chicago Bears		NR	91
92	Eric Weddle	Safety	San Diego Chargers		NR	92
93	Ryan Kalil	Center	Carolina Panthers		NR	93
94	Sheldon Richardson	Defensive tackle	New York Jets		NR	94
95	Brent Grimes	Cornerback	Miami Dolphins		NR	95
96	Daryl Washington	Linebacker	Arizona Cardinals		▼2	96
97	Louis Vasquez	Guard	Denver Broncos		NR	97
98	Jason Witten	Tight end	Dallas Cowboys		▼57	98
99	Cameron Jordan	Defensive end	New Orleans Saints		NR	99
100	Matthew Stafford	Quarterback	Detroit Lions		▼24	100
