= NFL Top 100 Players of 2011 =

- Season 2011
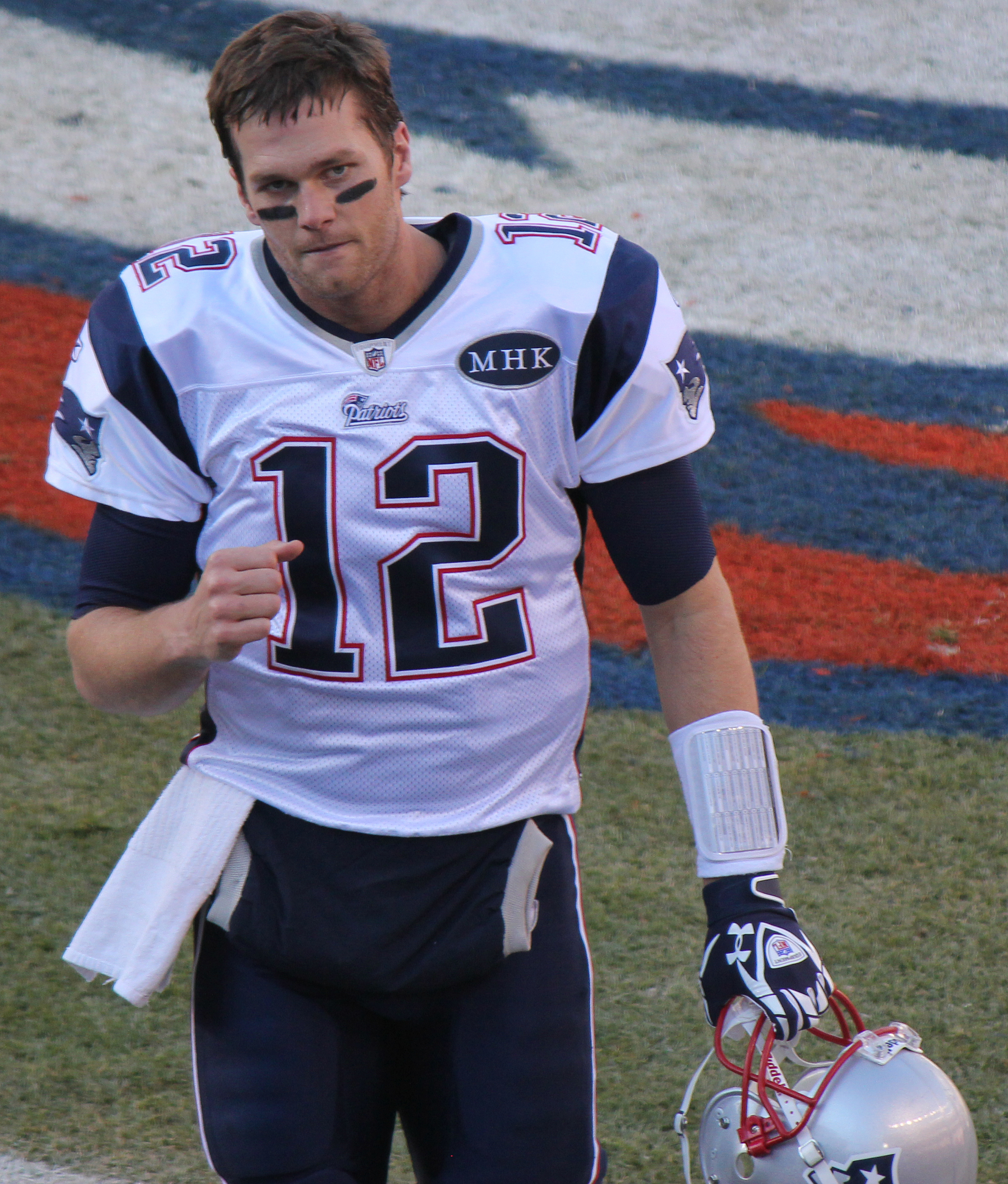
- Tom Brady, the #1 ranked player
- No. of episodes: 11

Release
- Original network: NFL Network
- Original release: April 30 – July 3, 2011

Season chronology
- Next → 2012

The NFL Top 100 Players of 2011 was the first season in the NFL Top 100 series. It ended with reigning NFL MVP Tom Brady being ranked #1, while Super Bowl MVP Aaron Rodgers was ranked #11. Four teams ended up with no players on the list: Buffalo Bills, Cincinnati Bengals, Seattle Seahawks, Washington Redskins.

== Episode list ==
Episode No.	Air date	Numbers revealed
1	April 30	100–91
2	May 7	90–81
3	May 14	80–71
4	May 21	70–61
5	May 28	60–51
6	June 4	50–41
7	June 11	40–31
8	June 18	30–21
9	June 25	20–11
10	July 3	10–6
11	July 3	5–1

== The list ==
Rank	Player	Position	2010 team	2011 team	Reference
1	Tom Brady	Quarterback	New England Patriots		1
2	Peyton Manning	Quarterback	Indianapolis Colts		2
3	Adrian Peterson	Running back	Minnesota Vikings		3
4	Ray Lewis	Linebacker	Baltimore Ravens		4
5	Ed Reed	Safety	Baltimore Ravens		5
6	Troy Polamalu	Safety	Pittsburgh Steelers		6
7	Andre Johnson	Wide receiver	Houston Texans		7
8	Darrelle Revis	Cornerback	New York Jets		8
9	Drew Brees	Quarterback	New Orleans Saints		9
10	Julius Peppers	Defensive end	Chicago Bears		
11	Aaron Rodgers	Quarterback	Green Bay Packers		11
12	DeMarcus Ware	Linebacker	Dallas Cowboys		12
13	Chris Johnson	Running back	Tennessee Titans		13
14	Larry Fitzgerald	Wide receiver	Arizona Cardinals		14
15	Dwight Freeney	Defensive end	Indianapolis Colts		
16	Charles Woodson	Cornerback	Green Bay Packers		16
17	Haloti Ngata	Defensive tackle	Baltimore Ravens		
18	Nnamdi Asomugha	Cornerback	Oakland Raiders	Philadelphia Eagles	18
19	Clay Matthews	Linebacker	Green Bay Packers		19
20	Michael Vick	Quarterback	Philadelphia Eagles		20
21	James Harrison	Linebacker	Pittsburgh Steelers		21
22	Antonio Gates	Tight end	San Diego Chargers		22
23	Patrick Willis	Linebacker	San Francisco 49ers		23
24	Roddy White	Wide receiver	Atlanta Falcons		24
25	Arian Foster	Running back	Houston Texans		25
26	Philip Rivers	Quarterback	San Diego Chargers		26
27	Calvin Johnson	Wide receiver	Detroit Lions		27
28	Jake Long	Offensive tackle	Miami Dolphins		
29	DeSean Jackson	Wide receiver	Philadelphia Eagles		29
30	Maurice Jones-Drew	Running back	Jacksonville Jaguars		30
31	Reggie Wayne	Wide receiver	Indianapolis Colts		31
32	Devin Hester	Wide receiver	Chicago Bears		
33	Jamaal Charles	Running back	Kansas City Chiefs		33
34	Jahri Evans	Guard	New Orleans Saints		
35	Vince Wilfork	Defensive tackle	New England Patriots		35
36	Jason Witten	Tight end	Dallas Cowboys		
37	Jonathan Vilma	Linebacker	New Orleans Saints		37
38	Steven Jackson	Running back	St. Louis Rams		38
39	Logan Mankins	Guard	New England Patriots		39
40	Terrell Suggs	Linebacker	Baltimore Ravens		40
41	Ben Roethlisberger	Quarterback	Pittsburgh Steelers		
42	Michael Turner	Running back	Atlanta Falcons		42
43	Joe Thomas	Offensive tackle	Cleveland Browns		43
44	Robert Mathis	Defensive end	Indianapolis Colts		44
45	Dwayne Bowe	Wide receiver	Kansas City Chiefs		45
46	Tony Gonzalez	Tight end	Atlanta Falcons		46
47	Nick Mangold	Center	New York Jets		
48	Champ Bailey	Cornerback	Denver Broncos		
49	Brian Urlacher	Linebacker	Chicago Bears		49
50	Wes Welker	Wide receiver	New England Patriots		50
51	Ndamukong Suh	Defensive tackle	Detroit Lions		51
52	Matt Ryan	Quarterback	Atlanta Falcons		52
53	Marques Colston	Wide receiver	New Orleans Saints		53
54	Asante Samuel	Cornerback	Philadelphia Eagles		54
55	Carl Nicks	Guard	New Orleans Saints		
56	Ray Rice	Running back	Baltimore Ravens		56
57	Andre Gurode	Center	Dallas Cowboys	Baltimore Ravens	57
58	Brandon Lloyd	Wide receiver	Denver Broncos	Denver Broncos / St. Louis Rams	58
59	Jeff Saturday	Center	Indianapolis Colts		59
60	Justin Tuck	Defensive end	New York Giants		60
61	Brandon Marshall	Wide receiver	Miami Dolphins		61
62	Jerod Mayo	Linebacker	New England Patriots		
63	Cameron Wake	Defensive end	Miami Dolphins		63
64	Tamba Hali	Defensive end	Kansas City Chiefs		64
65	Vonta Leach	Fullback	Houston Texans	Baltimore Ravens	65
66	Richard Seymour	Defensive tackle	Oakland Raiders		66
67	Brian Waters	Guard	Kansas City Chiefs	New England Patriots	67
68	Antrel Rolle	Safety	New York Giants		
69	John Abraham	Defensive end	Atlanta Falcons		69
70	Miles Austin	Wide receiver	Dallas Cowboys		70
71	Mario Williams	Defensive end	Houston Texans		71
72	Tony Romo	Quarterback	Dallas Cowboys		72
73	Trent Cole	Defensive end	Philadelphia Eagles		
74	Greg Jennings	Wide receiver	Green Bay Packers		74
75	Jay Ratliff	Defensive tackle	Dallas Cowboys		75
76	Santonio Holmes	Wide receiver	New York Jets		76
77	Chris Snee	Guard	New York Giants		77
78	Dallas Clark	Tight end	Indianapolis Colts		78
79	D'Brickashaw Ferguson	Offensive tackle	New York Jets		
80	Jared Allen	Defensive end	Minnesota Vikings		80
81	B. J. Raji	Defensive tackle	Green Bay Packers		81
82	LaMarr Woodley	Linebacker	Pittsburgh Steelers		
83	Mike Williams	Wide receiver	Tampa Bay Buccaneers		83
84	Josh Cribbs	Wide receiver	Cleveland Browns		84
85	Jason Babin	Defensive end	Tennessee Titans	Philadelphia Eagles	
86	Josh Freeman	Quarterback	Tampa Bay Buccaneers		86
87	Jordan Gross	Offensive tackle	Carolina Panthers		
88	Vernon Davis	Tight end	San Francisco 49ers		88
89	Adrian Wilson	Safety	Arizona Cardinals		89
90	Joe Flacco	Quarterback	Baltimore Ravens		
91	Terrell Owens	Wide receiver	Cincinnati Bengals	None	
92	Lance Briggs	Linebacker	Chicago Bears		
93	Eric Berry	Safety	Kansas City Chiefs		
94	Frank Gore	Running back	San Francisco 49ers		94
95	Jon Beason	Linebacker	Carolina Panthers		
96	Nick Collins	Safety	Green Bay Packers		96
97	Shaun Phillips	Linebacker	San Diego Chargers		
98	Darren McFadden	Running back	Oakland Raiders		98
99	Chad Clifton	Offensive tackle	Green Bay Packers		
100	Donovan McNabb	Quarterback	Washington Redskins	Minnesota Vikings	
