= Vonta Leach =

American football player (born 1981)

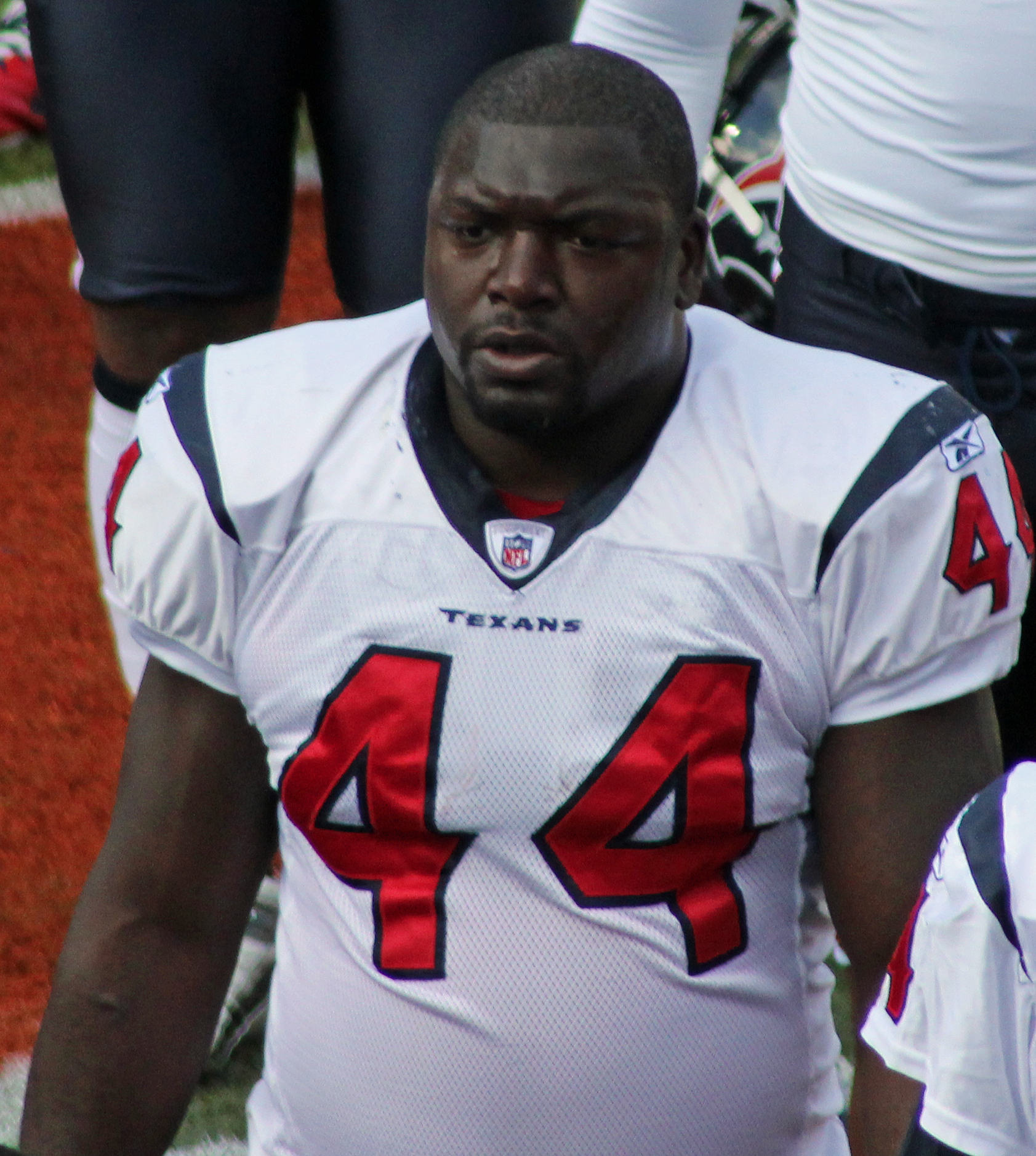
- Leach with the Houston Texans in 2010

No. 48, 44
- Position: Fullback

Personal information
- Born: November 6, 1981 (age 44); Lumberton, North Carolina, U.S.
- Listed height: 6 ft 0 in (1.83 m)
- Listed weight: 260 lb (118 kg)

Career information
- High school: South Robeson (Rowland, North Carolina)
- College: East Carolina (2000–2003)
- NFL draft: 2004: undrafted

Career history
- Green Bay Packers (2004–2006); New Orleans Saints (2006); Houston Texans (2006–2010); Baltimore Ravens (2011–2013)

Awards and highlights
- Super Bowl champion (XLVII); 3× First-team All-Pro (2010–2012); 3× Pro Bowl (2010–2012)

Career NFL statistics
- Rushing yards: 93
- Rushing average: 2.7
- Rushing touchdowns: 3
- Receptions: 123
- Receiving yards: 796
- Receiving touchdowns: 5
- Stats at Pro Football Reference

Terzell Vonta Leach (/ˈvɒnteɪ ˈliːtʃ/ VON-tay LEETCH; born November 6, 1981) is an American former professional football player who was a fullback for ten seasons in the National Football League (NFL). He was signed by the Green Bay Packers as an undrafted free agent in 2004. He played college football at East Carolina.

Leach also played for the New Orleans Saints, Houston Texans, and Baltimore Ravens.

== Early life ==
Leach grew up in Rowland, North Carolina before attending East Carolina University, where he played for the East Carolina Pirates football team from 2000 to 2003. He became a member of Omega Psi Phi fraternity. Leach earned his degree in 2010 after completing his online classes.

== Professional career ==
Pre-draft measurables
Height	Weight	40-yard dash	20-yard shuttle	Three-cone drill	Vertical jump	Broad jump	Bench press
5 ft 11 5/8 in (1.82 m)	241 lb (109 kg)	4.87 s	4.54 s	7.46 s	31.0 in (0.79 m)	8 ft 9 in (2.67 m)	21 reps
All values from Pro Day

=== Green Bay Packers ===
Leach spent the first three years of his career with the Green Bay Packers, and compiled 5 receptions for 19 yards. On October 9, 2005, he caught Aaron Rodgers' first completion. He was released by the Packers on September 13, 2006.

=== New Orleans Saints ===
The New Orleans Saints claimed Leach off waivers one day after the Packers released him, but he was eventually released by the team.

=== Houston Texans ===
The Houston Texans signed Leach on October 9, 2006.

On March 19, 2007, Leach signed a four-year, $8 million restricted free agent offer sheet with the New York Giants. However, the Texans matched the Giants' offer and Leach returned to Houston. Leach scored the first touchdown of his NFL career on December 13, 2007, in a 31–13 win over the Denver Broncos. In the 2008 season, Leach appeared in all 16 games and started 12. He finished with 12 receptions for 103 receiving yards to go with a rushing touchdown. In the 2009 season, Leach had 20 receptions for 155 yards and one touchdown in 16 games and four starts. After helping pave the way for teammate Arian Foster's breakout 2010 campaign, Leach was voted into the 2011 Pro Bowl, his first Pro Bowl selection. On January 24, 2011, Leach was also selected to the Associated Press's NFL All-Pro Team. Leach was announced as the 45th ranked player on the 2011 NFL Top 100.

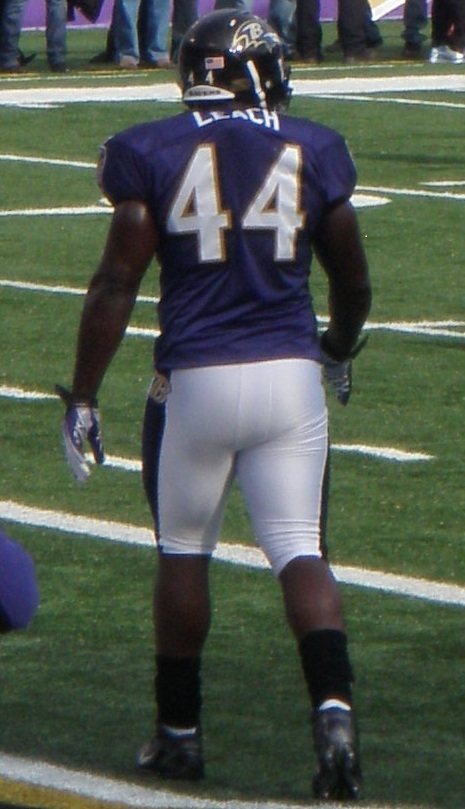
Leach in 2011

=== Baltimore Ravens ===
Leach signed a three-year, $11 million contract with the Baltimore Ravens on July 31, 2011, making him the highest paid fullback in the NFL. While paving the way for Ray Rice, Leach also amassed 12 carries for 35 yards, plus 15 receptions for 69 yards. This performance earned him another first team All-Pro nomination and Pro Bowl appearance in 2011. He was ranked 45th by his fellow players on the NFL Top 100 Players of 2012.

Leach earned first team All-Pro honors for the third time for his performance in the 2012 season. Leach was announced the fullback for the AFC in the 2013 Pro Bowl—his 3rd selection for the Pro Bowl—but was not able to play because the Ravens had qualified for Super Bowl XLVII with their victory over the New England Patriots in the 2012 AFC Championship. Leach earned his first NFL Championship in Super Bowl XLVII when the Ravens defeated the San Francisco 49ers 34–31.

On June 10, 2013, Leach announced on Twitter that he might be cut or traded because he could not reach a compromise on his reduced contract.

On July 29, 2013, Leach re-signed with the Baltimore Ravens.

On September 5, 2013, Leach scored the first touchdown of the 2013 NFL season on a 2-yard pass from Joe Flacco in a game against the Denver Broncos. Leach gradually saw his playing time decrease as the 2013 season progressed and he was only used in a dozen snaps over the last three games of the year.

On February 27, 2014, the Ravens released Leach, making him an unrestricted free agent.

On July 24, 2019, the Ravens announced that Leach would be signed to a one-day contract and retire as a Raven on July 26, 2019.
