= NFL Top 100 Players of 2016 =

- Season 2016
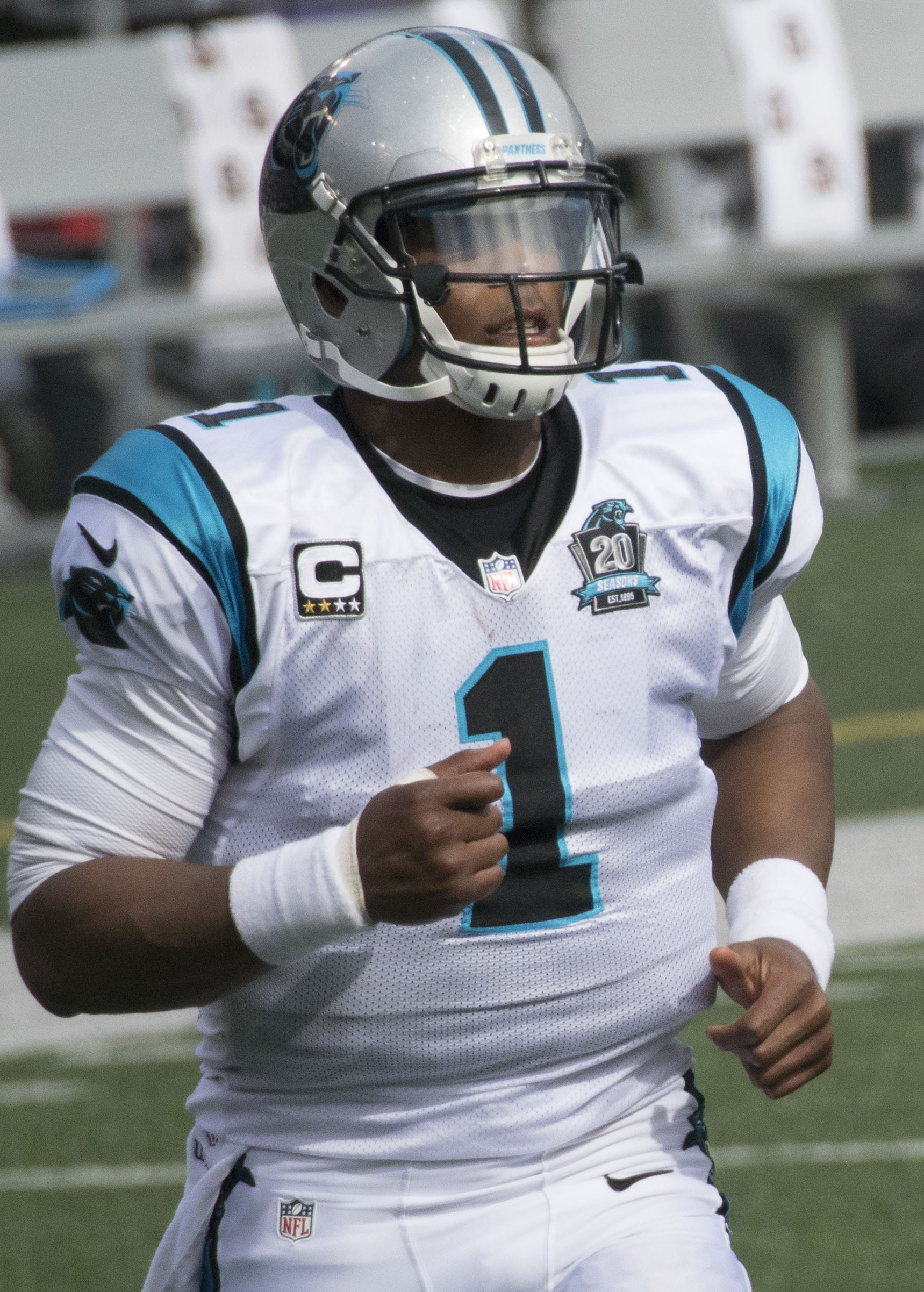
- Cam Newton, the #1 ranked player
- No. of episodes: 11

Release
- Original network: NFL Network
- Original release: May 4 – July 6, 2016

Season chronology
- ← Previous; 2015 Next → 2017

The NFL Top 100 Players of 2016 was the sixth season in the NFL Top 100 series. It aired on May 4, 2016. It ended with reigning NFL MVP Cam Newton being ranked #1. The Kansas City Chiefs had the most players selected with nine, while the Chicago Bears were the only team with no selections.

== Episode list ==
| Episode No. | Air date | Numbers revealed |
|---|---|---|
| 1 | May 4 | 100–91 |
| 2 | May 11 | 90–81 |
| 3 | May 18 | 80–71 |
| 4 | May 25 | 70–61 |
| 5 | June 1 | 60–51 |
| 6 | June 8 | 50–41 |
| 7 | June 15 | 40–31 |
| 8 | June 22 | 30–21 |
| 9 | June 29 | 20–11 |
| 10 | July 6 | 10–6 |
| 11 | July 6 | 5–1 |

== The list ==
| Rank | Player | Position | 2015 team | 2016 team | Rank change | Reference |
|---|---|---|---|---|---|---|
| 1 | Cam Newton | Quarterback | Carolina Panthers | | ▲72 | 1 |
| 2 | Tom Brady | Quarterback | New England Patriots | | ▲1 | 2 |
| 3 | J. J. Watt | Defensive end | Houston Texans | | ▼2 | 3 |
| 4 | Antonio Brown | Wide receiver | Pittsburgh Steelers | | ▲4 | 4 |
| 5 | Adrian Peterson | Running back | Minnesota Vikings | | ▲57 | 5 |
| 6 | Aaron Rodgers | Quarterback | Green Bay Packers | | ▼4 | 6 |
| 7 | Luke Kuechly | Linebacker | Carolina Panthers | | ▲7 | 7 |
| 8 | Julio Jones | Wide receiver | Atlanta Falcons | | ▲5 | 8 |
| 9 | Rob Gronkowski | Tight end | New England Patriots | | ▲1 | 9 |
| 10 | Odell Beckham Jr. | Wide receiver | New York Giants | | ▲22 | 10 |
| 11 | Josh Norman | Cornerback | Carolina Panthers | Washington Redskins | NR | 11 |
| 12 | Carson Palmer | Quarterback | Arizona Cardinals | | NR | 12 |
| 13 | Khalil Mack | Defensive end | Oakland Raiders | | ▲36 | 13 |
| 14 | Aaron Donald | Defensive tackle | St. Louis / Los Angeles Rams | | ▲78 | 14 |
| 15 | Von Miller | Linebacker | Denver Broncos | | ▲18 | 15 |
| 16 | A.J. Green | Wide receiver | Cincinnati Bengals | | ▲21 | 16 |
| 17 | Russell Wilson | Quarterback | Seattle Seahawks | | ▲5 | 17 |
| 18 | Patrick Peterson | Cornerback | Arizona Cardinals | | ▲1 | 18 |
| 19 | DeAndre Hopkins | Wide receiver | Houston Texans | | NR | 19 |
| 20 | Richard Sherman | Cornerback | Seattle Seahawks | | ▼9 | 20 |
| 21 | Ben Roethlisberger | Quarterback | Pittsburgh Steelers | | ▲5 | 21 |
| 22 | Todd Gurley | Running back | St. Louis / Los Angeles Rams | | NR | 22 |
| 23 | Joe Thomas | Offensive tackle | Cleveland Browns | | ▲2 | 23 |
| 24 | Darrelle Revis | Cornerback | New York Jets | | ▼7 | 24 |
| 25 | Brandon Marshall | Wide receiver | New York Jets | | ▲32 | 25 |
| 26 | Justin Houston | Linebacker | Kansas City Chiefs | | ▲1 | 26 |
| 27 | Larry Fitzgerald | Wide receiver | Arizona Cardinals | | ▲41 | 27 |
| 28 | Tyrann Mathieu | Safety | Arizona Cardinals | | NR | 28 |
| 29 | Geno Atkins | Defensive tackle | Cincinnati Bengals | | NR | 29 |
| 30 | Drew Brees | Quarterback | New Orleans Saints | | 0 | 30 |
| 31 | Allen Robinson | Wide receiver | Jacksonville Jaguars | | NR | 31 |
| 32 | Kam Chancellor | Safety | Seattle Seahawks | | ▲9 | 32 |
| 33 | Doug Martin | Running back | Tampa Bay Buccaneers | | NR | 33 |
| 34 | Aqib Talib | Cornerback | Denver Broncos | | NR | 34 |
| 35 | Andy Dalton | Quarterback | Cincinnati Bengals | | NR | 35 |
| 36 | DeMarcus Ware | Linebacker | Denver Broncos | | ▲51 | 36 |
| 37 | Marshal Yanda | Guard | Baltimore Ravens | | ▲42 | 37 |
| 38 | Greg Olsen | Tight end | Carolina Panthers | | ▲51 | 38 |
| 39 | Muhammad Wilkerson | Defensive end | New York Jets | | ▲35 | 39 |
| 40 | Ndamukong Suh | Defensive tackle | Miami Dolphins | | ▼16 | 40 |
| 41 | Le'Veon Bell | Running back | Pittsburgh Steelers | | ▼25 | 41 |
| 42 | Tyron Smith | Offensive tackle | Dallas Cowboys | | ▼6 | 42 |
| 43 | Ezekiel Ansah | Defensive end | Detroit Lions | | NR | 43 |
| 44 | Tyler Eifert | Tight end | Cincinnati Bengals | | NR | 44 |
| 45 | Trent Williams | Offensive tackle | Washington Redskins | | ▲2 | 45 |
| 46 | Philip Rivers | Quarterback | San Diego Chargers | | ▼3 | 46 |
| 47 | Eli Manning | Quarterback | New York Giants | | NR | 47 |
| 48 | Chandler Jones | Defensive end | New England Patriots | Arizona Cardinals | NR | 48 |
| 49 | Fletcher Cox | Defensive tackle | Philadelphia Eagles | | NR | 49 |
| 50 | Devonta Freeman | Running back | Atlanta Falcons | | NR | 50 |
| 51 | Dez Bryant | Wide receiver | Dallas Cowboys | | ▼36 | 51 |
| 52 | Chris Harris Jr. | Cornerback | Denver Broncos | | NR | 52 |
| 53 | Lavonte David | Linebacker | Tampa Bay Buccaneers | | ▲3 | 53 |
| 54 | Thomas Davis Sr. | Linebacker | Carolina Panthers | | NR | 54 |
| 55 | Eric Berry | Safety | Kansas City Chiefs | | NR | 55 |
| 56 | Blake Bortles | Quarterback | Jacksonville Jaguars | | NR | 56 |
| 57 | Clay Matthews | Linebacker | Green Bay Packers | | ▼6 | 57 |
| 58 | Kawann Short | Defensive tackle | Carolina Panthers | | NR | 58 |
| 59 | Michael Bennett | Defensive end | Seattle Seahawks | | ▲31 | 59 |
| 60 | Reggie Nelson | Safety | Cincinnati Bengals | Oakland Raiders | NR | 60 |
| 61 | NaVorro Bowman | Linebacker | San Francisco 49ers | | NR | 61 |
| 62 | Demaryius Thomas | Wide receiver | Denver Broncos | | ▼42 | 62 |
| 63 | Gerald McCoy | Defensive tackle | Tampa Bay Buccaneers | | ▼35 | 63 |
| 64 | Reshad Jones | Safety | Miami Dolphins | | NR | 64 |
| 65 | Marcus Peters | Cornerback | Kansas City Chiefs | | NR | 65 |
| 66 | Earl Thomas | Safety | Seattle Seahawks | | ▼45 | 66 |
| 67 | Andrew Whitworth | Offensive tackle | Cincinnati Bengals | | NR | 67 |
| 68 | T.J. Ward | Safety | Denver Broncos | | NR | 68 |
| 69 | LeSean McCoy | Running back | Buffalo Bills | | ▼40 | 69 |
| 70 | Carlos Dunlap | Defensive end | Cincinnati Bengals | | NR | 70 |
| 71 | Calais Campbell | Defensive end | Arizona Cardinals | | ▲28 | 71 |
| 72 | Doug Baldwin | Wide receiver | Seattle Seahawks | | NR | 72 |
| 73 | Harrison Smith | Safety | Minnesota Vikings | | NR | 73 |
| 74 | Emmanuel Sanders | Wide receiver | Denver Broncos | | ▲21 | 74 |
| 75 | Jamaal Charles | Running back | Kansas City Chiefs | | ▼63 | 75 |
| 76 | Linval Joseph | Defensive tackle | Minnesota Vikings | | NR | 76 |
| 77 | Jordan Reed | Tight end | Washington Redskins | | NR | 77 |
| 78 | Chris Ivory | Running back | New York Jets | Jacksonville Jaguars | NR | 78 |
| 79 | Ryan Kalil | Center | Carolina Panthers | | NR | 79 |
| 80 | Derrick Johnson | Linebacker | Kansas City Chiefs | | NR | 80 |
| 81 | Alex Smith | Quarterback | Kansas City Chiefs | | NR | 81 |
| 82 | Delanie Walker | Tight end | Tennessee Titans | | NR | 82 |
| 83 | Telvin Smith | Linebacker | Jacksonville Jaguars | | NR | 83 |
| 84 | Tamba Hali | Linebacker | Kansas City Chiefs | | ▼14 | 84 |
| 85 | Kirk Cousins | Quarterback | Washington Redskins | | NR | 85 |
| 86 | Jonathan Stewart | Running back | Carolina Panthers | | NR | 86 |
| 87 | Julian Edelman | Wide receiver | New England Patriots | | ▲4 | 87 |
| 88 | Cameron Heyward | Defensive end | Pittsburgh Steelers | | NR | 88 |
| 89 | Allen Hurns | Wide receiver | Jacksonville Jaguars | | NR | 89 |
| 90 | Matt Forte | Running back | Chicago Bears | New York Jets | ▼42 | 90 |
| 91 | Travis Kelce | Tight end | Kansas City Chiefs | | NR | 91 |
| 92 | Andrew Luck | Quarterback | Indianapolis Colts | | ▼85 | 92 |
| 93 | Jeremy Maclin | Wide receiver | Kansas City Chiefs | | ▼32 | 93 |
| 94 | Gary Barnidge | Tight end | Cleveland Browns | | NR | 94 |
| 95 | Mike Daniels | Defensive tackle | Green Bay Packers | | NR | 95 |
| 96 | Sammy Watkins | Wide receiver | Buffalo Bills | | NR | 96 |
| 97 | Richie Incognito | Guard | Buffalo Bills | | NR | 97 |
| 98 | Jarvis Landry | Wide receiver | Miami Dolphins | | NR | 98 |
| 99 | Cameron Jordan | Defensive end | New Orleans Saints | | NR | 99 |
| 100 | Derek Carr | Quarterback | Oakland Raiders | | NR | 100 |
