= Tamba Hali =

Liberian born American football player (born 1983)

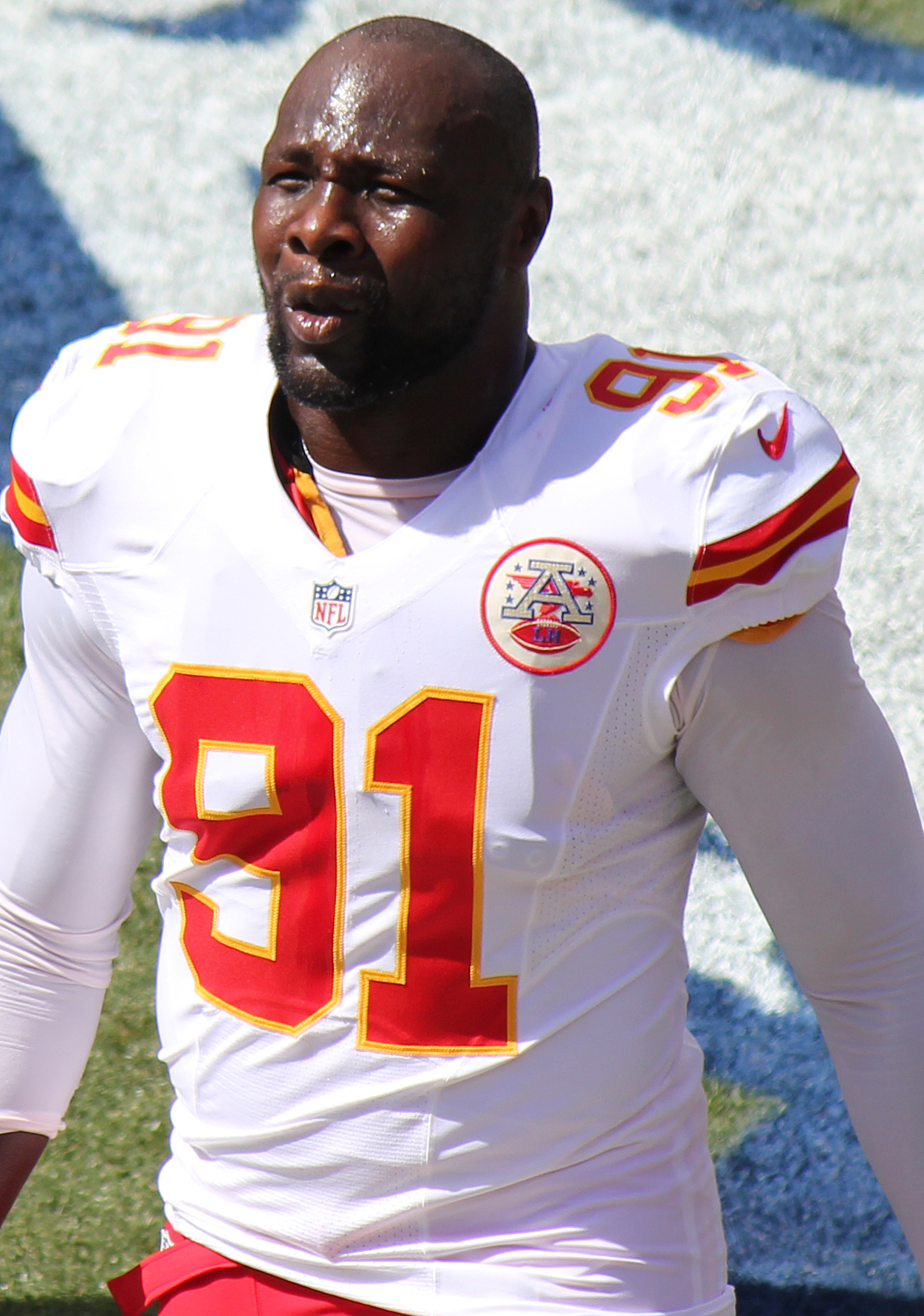
- Hali with the Kansas City Chiefs in 2014

No. 91
- Positions: Defensive end, linebacker

Personal information
- Born: 3 November 1983 (age 43); Gbarnga, Liberia
- Listed height: 6 ft 3 in (1.91 m)
- Listed weight: 275 lb (125 kg)

Career information
- High school: Teaneck (Teaneck, New Jersey, U.S.)
- College: Penn State (2002–2005)
- NFL draft: 2006: 1st round, 20th overall pick

Career history
- Kansas City Chiefs (2006–2017)

Awards and highlights
- 2× Second-team All-Pro (2011, 2013); 6× Pro Bowl (2010–2015); PFWA All-Rookie Team (2006); Kansas City Chiefs Hall of Fame; Unanimous All-American (2005); Big Ten Defensive Lineman of the Year (2005); First-team All-Big Ten (2005); Second-team All-Big Ten (2004)

Career NFL statistics
- Total tackles: 591
- Sacks: 89.5
- Forced fumbles: 32
- Fumble recoveries: 8
- Stats at Pro Football Reference

Tamba Boimah Hali (born 3 November 1983) is a Liberian former professional player of American football who was a defensive end and linebacker in the National Football League (NFL). He played college football for the Penn State Nittany Lions, earning unanimous All-American honors. Hali was selected by the Kansas City Chiefs in the first round of the 2006 NFL draft.

He played his entire twelve-year career for the Chiefs, where he was selected to six consecutive Pro Bowls from 2010 to 2015 and was a Second-team All-Pro selection in 2011 and in 2013.

== Early life ==
Hali was born in Gbarnga, Liberia. He was sent to the United States at the age of 10 to escape civil war-torn Liberia. He worked to become an NFL-caliber player because he thought it would help him raise the money to reunite with his mother, Rachel Keita, and bring her to the United States after not having seen her for more than twelve years.

Raised in Teaneck, New Jersey, Hali attended Teaneck High School, where he played for the high school football team. He was named a high school All-American. He also lettered in basketball.

Considered a four-star recruit by Rivals.com, Hali was listed as the No. 5 strongside defensive end in the nation in 2002.

== College career ==
Hali received an athletic scholarship to attend Pennsylvania State University, where he played for coach Joe Paterno's Penn State Nittany Lions football team from 2002 to 2005. Following his senior season in 2005, Hali was recognized as a unanimous All-American, the Big Ten Defensive Lineman of the Year, and a first-team All-Big Ten selection. He was instrumental in helping the Nittany Lions finish 11–1, winning the Big Ten championship and the Orange Bowl that season.

He led the Big Ten with 11 sacks (tied for eighth nationally) and 17 tackles for loss and earned numerous accolades for his play. He was a finalist for the Bronko Nagurski Trophy, presented to the nation's top defensive player, and the Ted Hendricks Defensive End Award.

Hali's season sack total is tied for sixth-best at Penn State and his 36 career tackles for loss are tied with Matt Millen for tenth best. Hali received the Robert B. Mitinger Award, which is given to the Nittany Lion football player who best personifies courage, character, and social responsibility.

Hali was named defensive most valuable player (MVP) of the 2006 Senior Bowl. He was later inducted into the Senior Bowl Hall of Fame.

== Professional career ==
=== Pre-draft ===
Hali entered the 2006 NFL draft ranked as the third-best defensive end behind Mario Williams and Kamerion Wimbley. Tamba spent some time as a defensive tackle in college.

There was not much pre-draft hype for Hali heading into the 2006 NFL Draft until The Sporting News made his amazing story of escape from war-torn Liberia at age 10 their 21 April 2006 cover story. NFL scouts began to take notice, reporting that Hali presented himself in an excellent manner not only in his workout but also in his interview at the NFL Combine.

Pre-draft measurables
Height	Weight	Arm length	Hand span	40-yard dash	20-yard shuttle	Three-cone drill	Vertical jump	Broad jump	Bench press
6 ft 3 in (1.91 m)	275 lb (125 kg)	33 3/8 in (0.85 m)	10 1/2 in (0.27 m)	4.87 s	4.31 s	7.28 s	30 in (0.76 m)	8 ft 10 in (2.69 m)	18 reps
All values from Penn State Pro Day, except measurables from NFL Combine

=== 2006 season ===
Hali was chosen 20th overall by the Kansas City Chiefs in a surprise move.

On 31 July 2006, Hali was excused from the Chiefs two-a-day practices at training camp in River Falls, Wisconsin, and flew back to his home in Teaneck, New Jersey to be sworn in as a permanent citizen of the United States. On 28 September 2006, Hali's mother Rachel arrived in Kansas City, Missouri and lived with Tamba on a one-year visa. On 1 October, she saw her son play for the first time as the Chiefs shut out the San Francisco 49ers, 41–0.

Hali won the Mack Lee Hill award as the top Chiefs rookie for 2006. At the end of the 2006 NFL season, Hali led the Chiefs with eight sacks. He was named to the NFL All-Rookie Team.

=== 2007–2010 ===
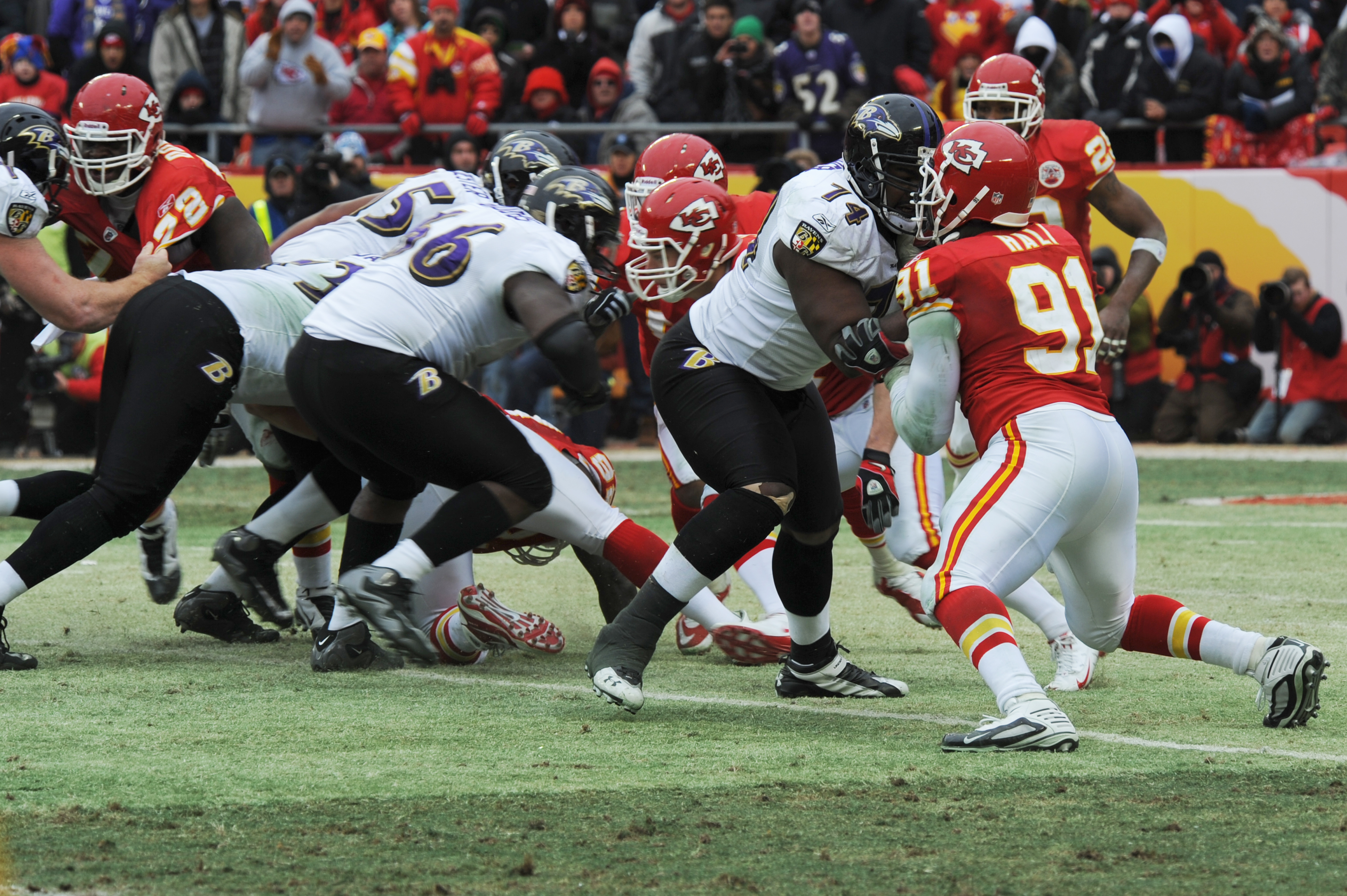
Hali (#91) playing against the Baltimore Ravens in the Wild Card game.

In 2007, Hali had 7.5 sacks to go along with 59 total tackles, two passes defensed, and two forced fumbles. Hali moved to right defensive end for the 2008 season, replacing Jared Allen. In the 2008 season, he had three sacks, 55 total tackles, two passes defensed, and three forced fumbles. In 2009, Hali was again moved—this time to outside linebacker—to accommodate new head coach Todd Haley's 3–4 defense. Hali's transformation from an undersized 4–3 DE to a 3–4 OLB was an amazing one considering his time in college as a defensive tackle. He finished the 2009 season with 8.5 sacks, 63 total tackles, one pass defensed, four forced fumbles, and scored a safety.

In 2010, the Chiefs hired a new defensive coordinator, Romeo Crennel. He earned AFC Defensive Player of the Week for Week 3. Hali finished the season with an AFC-leading 14.5 sacks, leading to his first invitation to the Pro Bowl, which he declined citing personal reasons. Chiefs' general manager Scott Pioli made the signing of Hali to a long-term deal his top priority that off-season. Despite a lockout being in place, the two sides signed a five-year, $60 million (~$84.6 million in 2025) contract ($35 million guaranteed) on 4 August 2011. He was ranked 64th by his fellow players on the NFL Top 100 Players of 2011.

=== 2011–2016 ===
Hali repaid this loyalty with an All-Pro season, racking up a career-high 83 tackles and leading the team in sacks (12) for the fifth time in his six seasons as a Chief. He was named an All-Pro and selected to play in the 2012 Pro Bowl. Hali started all 16 games in 2011 and finished second in sacks in the AFC. He tied for third in the conference with four forced fumbles, a team-best 12 tackles for loss, and 31 quarterback pressures. Hali moved into fourth place on the Chiefs' career sacks list that season. He was ranked #34 his fellow players on the NFL Top 100 Players of 2012.

On 20 August 2012, the NFL suspended Hali for one game for a violation of the league's substance abuse policy. On 26 December 2012, Hali was announced the starting outside linebacker for the AFC in the 2013 Pro Bowl. He finished the 2012 season with nine sacks, 51 total tackles, two passes defensed, and one forced fumble.

In the 2013 season, Hali started in 15 games. In 15 appearances, he had 46 tackles, of which 39 were solo. He had 11 sacks, five forced fumbles, and one interception. Hali earned AFC Defensive Player of the Week for Weeks 6 and 14. He earned his third consecutive Pro Bowl nod and was ranked 43rd by his fellow players on the NFL Top 100 Players of 2014. In the 2014 season, Hali started in all 16 games. He had 59 tackles, of which 47 were solo, six sacks, and three forced fumbles He earned AFC Defensive Player of the Week in Week 15. He earned his fourth consecutive Pro Bowl nomination and was ranked 70th by his fellow players on the NFL Top 100 Players of 2015.

On 8 March 2015, Hali restructured his contract to free up $3 million (~$3.98 million in 2025) in cap space to stay with the Chiefs. Throughout the off-season, it was believed Hali would be released. In the 2015 season, he had 6.5 sacks, 48 total tackles, one pass defensed, and two forced fumbles. Hali made the Pro Bowl for the fifth consecutive year and was ranked 84th by his fellow players on the NFL Top 100 Players of 2016. On 8 March 2016, Hali signed a three-year contract to stay with the Chiefs. In the 2016 season, he had 3.5 sacks, 34 total tackles, and one fumble recovery.

=== 2017 season ===
In 2017, Hali started the 2017 season on the physically unable to perform list due to an undisclosed injury that kept him out all of training camp and the preseason. He began practicing again on 2 November. The Chiefs had 21 days from the day he starts practicing to either activate him or place him on injured reserve. He was moved to the active roster on 4 November 2017, prior to the team's Week 9 game against the Dallas Cowboys. He appeared in five games and had one tackle and one quarterback hit.

On 12 March 2018, Hali was released by the Chiefs after 12 seasons. He finished his tenure with the Chiefs second in team history in sacks behind only Hall of Fame linebacker Derrick Thomas.

=== Retirement ===
On 10 May 2021, Hali signed a one-day contract with the Chiefs to retire as a member of the team.

== NFL career statistics ==
Year	Team	Games		Tackles				Fumbles			Interceptions			
Year	Team	GP	GS	Cmb	Solo	Ast	Sck	FF	FR	Yds	Int	Yds	TD	PD
2006	KC	16	16	58	41	17	8.0	5	1	0	1	-9	0	4
2007	KC	16	16	58	46	12	7.5	2	0	0	0	0	0	2
2008	KC	15	15	54	43	11	3.0	3	1	0	0	0	0	2
2009	KC	16	16	62	46	16	8.5	4	0	0	0	0	0	1
2010	KC	16	16	51	36	15	14.5	4	2	2	0	0	0	3
2011	KC	16	16	66	48	18	12.0	4	0	0	0	0	0	0
2012	KC	15	15	54	43	11	9.0	1	0	0	0	0	0	2
2013	KC	15	15	46	39	7	11.0	5	2	11	1	10	1	1
2014	KC	16	16	59	47	12	6.0	3	1	0	0	0	0	0
2015	KC	15	14	45	36	9	6.5	2	0	0	0	0	0	0
2016	KC	16	2	34	24	10	3.5	0	1	0	0	0	0	0
2017	KC	5	0	1	1	0	0.0	0	0	0	0	0	0	0
Career		175	158	588	453	135	89.5	33	8	13	2	1	1	16

== Personal life ==
Hali's first name is based on Kissi culture wherein the second son born to a woman is always named "Tamba".

On 8 January 2016, Hali's fiancé gave birth to their son.

In his spare time, Hali writes rap music which he records in a studio in his basement. On 9 June 2017, Hali released his single that was produced by Masterkraft, "The One For Me", on Apple Music.

Hali became a U.S. citizen on 31 July 2006. Following his rookie year, Hali began training in Brazilian jiu-jitsu under the instruction of Rener Gracie and was promoted to purple belt in November 2017.
