= NFL Top 100 Players of 2012 =

- Season 2012
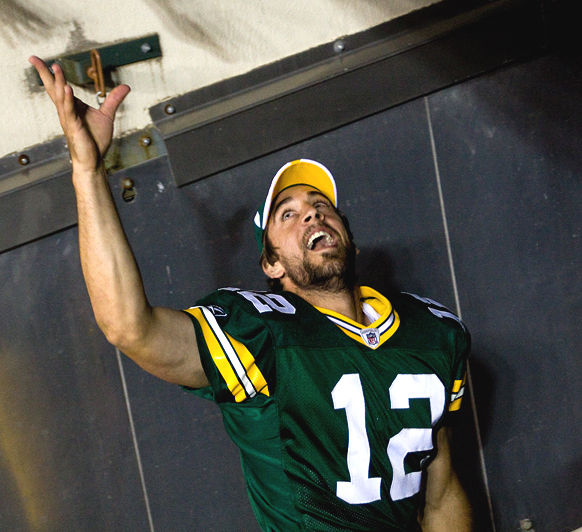
- Aaron Rodgers, the #1 ranked player
- No. of episodes: 11

Release
- Original network: NFL Network
- Original release: April 28 – June 27, 2012

Season chronology
- ← Previous; 2011 Next → 2013

The NFL Top 100 Players of 2012 was the second season in the NFL Top 100 series. It ended with reigning NFL MVP Aaron Rodgers being ranked #1, while Super Bowl MVP Eli Manning was ranked #31.

== Episode list ==
Episode No.	Air date	Numbers revealed
1	April 28	100–91
2	May 5	90–81
3	May 12	80–71
4	May 19	70–61
5	May 26	60–51
6	June 2	50–41
7	June 9	40–31
8	June 16	30–21
9	June 23	20–11
10	June 30	10–6
11	June 30	5–1

== The list ==
Rank	Player	Position	2011 team	2012 team	Rank change	Reference
1	Aaron Rodgers	Quarterback	Green Bay Packers		▲10	1
2	Drew Brees	Quarterback	New Orleans Saints		▲7	2
3	Calvin Johnson	Wide receiver	Detroit Lions		▲24	3
4	Tom Brady	Quarterback	New England Patriots		▼3	4
5	Darrelle Revis	Cornerback	New York Jets		▲3	5
6	DeMarcus Ware	Linebacker	Dallas Cowboys		▲6	6
7	Larry Fitzgerald	Wide receiver	Arizona Cardinals		▲7	7
8	Adrian Peterson	Running back	Minnesota Vikings		▼5	8
9	Haloti Ngata	Defensive tackle	Baltimore Ravens		▲8	9
10	Patrick Willis	Linebacker	San Francisco 49ers		▲13	10
11	Terrell Suggs	Linebacker	Baltimore Ravens		▲29	11
12	Maurice Jones-Drew	Running back	Jacksonville Jaguars		▲18	12
13	Jared Allen	Defensive end	Minnesota Vikings		▲67	13
14	Jimmy Graham	Tight end	New Orleans Saints		NR	14
15	Andre Johnson	Wide receiver	Houston Texans		▼8	15
16	Ed Reed	Safety	Baltimore Ravens		▼11	16
17	Justin Smith	Defensive end	San Francisco 49ers		NR	17
18	LeSean McCoy	Running back	Philadelphia Eagles		NR	18
19	Troy Polamalu	Safety	Pittsburgh Steelers		▼13	19
20	Ray Lewis	Linebacker	Baltimore Ravens		▼16	20
21	Rob Gronkowski	Tight end	New England Patriots		NR	21
22	Ray Rice	Running back	Baltimore Ravens		▲34	22
23	Wes Welker	Wide receiver	New England Patriots		▲27	23
24	Jason Pierre-Paul	Defensive end	New York Giants		NR	24
25	Arian Foster	Running back	Houston Texans		0	25
26	Julius Peppers	Defensive end	Chicago Bears		▼16	26
27	Clay Matthews	Linebacker	Green Bay Packers		▼8	27
28	Frank Gore	Running back	San Francisco 49ers		▲66	28
29	James Harrison	Linebacker	Pittsburgh Steelers		▼8	29
30	Ben Roethlisberger	Quarterback	Pittsburgh Steelers		▲11	30
31	Eli Manning	Quarterback	New York Giants		NR	31
32	Jahri Evans	Guard	New Orleans Saints		▲2	32
33	Matt Forte	Running back	Chicago Bears		NR	33
34	Tamba Hali	Defensive end	Kansas City Chiefs		▲30	34
35	Steve Smith	Wide receiver	Carolina Panthers		NR	35
36	Charles Woodson	Cornerback	Green Bay Packers		▼20	36
37	Steven Jackson	Running back	St. Louis Rams		▲1	37
38	Ndamukong Suh	Defensive tackle	Detroit Lions		▲13	38
39	Victor Cruz	Wide receiver	New York Giants		NR	39
40	Cam Newton	Quarterback	Carolina Panthers		NR	40
41	Matthew Stafford	Quarterback	Detroit Lions		NR	41
42	Jason Peters	Offensive tackle	Philadelphia Eagles		NR	42
43	Vernon Davis	Tight end	San Francisco 49ers		▲45	43
44	Jason Babin	Defensive end	Philadelphia Eagles	Philadelphia Eagles / Jacksonville Jaguars	▲41	44
45	Vonta Leach	Fullback	Baltimore Ravens		▲20	45
46	Champ Bailey	Cornerback	Denver Broncos		▲2	46
47	Mike Wallace	Wide receiver	Pittsburgh Steelers		NR	47
48	Devin Hester	Wide receiver	Chicago Bears		▼16	48
49	Maurkice Pouncey	Center	Pittsburgh Steelers		NR	49
50	Peyton Manning	Quarterback	Indianapolis Colts	Denver Broncos	▼48	50
51	Brian Urlacher	Linebacker	Chicago Bears		▼2	51
52	Von Miller	Linebacker	Denver Broncos		NR	52
53	Tony Gonzalez	Tight end	Atlanta Falcons		▼7	53
54	Brian Cushing	Linebacker	Houston Texans		NR	54
55	Patrick Peterson	Cornerback	Arizona Cardinals		NR	55
56	Greg Jennings	Wide receiver	Green Bay Packers		▲18	56
57	Trent Cole	Defensive end	Philadelphia Eagles		▲16	57
58	Jonathan Vilma	Linebacker	New Orleans Saints		▼21	58
59	Jake Long	Offensive tackle	Miami Dolphins		▼31	59
60	Darren McFadden	Running back	Oakland Raiders		▲38	60
61	Philip Rivers	Quarterback	San Diego Chargers		▼35	61
62	Justin Tuck	Defensive end	New York Giants		▼2	62
63	LaMarr Woodley	Linebacker	Pittsburgh Steelers		▲19	63
64	Logan Mankins	Guard	New England Patriots		▼25	64
65	Roddy White	Wide receiver	Atlanta Falcons		▼41	65
66	Earl Thomas	Safety	Seattle Seahawks		NR	66
67	Joe Staley	Offensive tackle	San Francisco 49ers		NR	67
68	Elvis Dumervil	Defensive end	Denver Broncos		NR	68
69	Carlos Rogers	Cornerback	San Francisco 49ers		NR	69
70	Michael Vick	Quarterback	Philadelphia Eagles		▼50	70
71	DeSean Jackson	Wide receiver	Philadelphia Eagles		▼42	71
72	Lance Briggs	Linebacker	Chicago Bears		▲20	72
73	Johnathan Joseph	Cornerback	Houston Texans		NR	73
74	Joe Flacco	Quarterback	Baltimore Ravens		▲16	74
75	Jason Witten	Tight end	Dallas Cowboys		▼39	75
76	Carl Nicks	Guard	New Orleans Saints	Tampa Bay Buccaneers	▼21	76
77	A. J. Green	Wide receiver	Cincinnati Bengals		NR	77
78	Derrick Johnson	Linebacker	Kansas City Chiefs		NR	78
79	Nnamdi Asomugha	Cornerback	Philadelphia Eagles		▼61	79
80	Jordy Nelson	Wide receiver	Green Bay Packers		NR	80
81	Vince Wilfork	Defensive tackle	New England Patriots		▼46	81
82	Joe Thomas	Offensive tackle	Cleveland Browns		▼39	82
83	Fred Jackson	Running back	Buffalo Bills		NR	83
84	Chris Long	Defensive end	St. Louis Rams		NR	84
85	NaVorro Bowman	Linebacker	San Francisco 49ers		NR	85
86	Darren Sproles	Running back	New Orleans Saints		NR	86
87	London Fletcher	Linebacker	Washington Redskins		NR	87
88	Michael Turner	Running back	Atlanta Falcons		▼46	88
89	Dwight Freeney	Defensive end	Indianapolis Colts		▼74	89
90	Hakeem Nicks	Wide receiver	New York Giants		NR	90
91	Tony Romo	Quarterback	Dallas Cowboys		▼19	91
92	John Kuhn	Fullback	Green Bay Packers		NR	92
93	Cortland Finnegan	Cornerback	Tennessee Titans	St. Louis Rams	NR	93
94	Marshawn Lynch	Running back	Seattle Seahawks		NR	94
95	Tim Tebow	Quarterback	Denver Broncos	New York Jets	NR	95
96	D'Qwell Jackson	Linebacker	Cleveland Browns		NR	96
97	Donald Penn	Offensive tackle	Tampa Bay Buccaneers		NR	97
98	Willis McGahee	Running back	Denver Broncos		NR	98
99	Ryan Kalil	Center	Carolina Panthers		NR	99
100	Chris Johnson	Running back	Tennessee Titans		▼87	100
