= Southeast High School (Oklahoma City) =

Coordinates: 35.412029°N 97.508155°W

- 5401 South Shields Boulevard; Oklahoma City, Oklahoma 73129; United States

Information
- Type: Co-educational, public, secondary
- Established: 1949
- Principal: Colin Selbo
- Staff: 50.94 (FTE)
- Grades: 9–12
- Enrollment: 848 (2023-2024)
- Student to teacher ratio: 16.65
- Colors: Blue; White; Black
- Fight song: Ole Southeast High!
- Mascot: Spartan
- Team name: Spartans
- Rival: U. S. Grant High School & Capitol Hill High School
- Website: https://sehs.okcps.org/

Southeast High School is a high school in Oklahoma City, Oklahoma, United States that opened in 1950. It closed in 1990, but was reopened and remodeled in 1994 as a magnet school with an emphasis on four new technology programs. Being a magnet school, students must fill out an application and be admitted to the school, regardless of the school district in which they reside.

When the school reopened in 1994, it was still undergoing renovations. Shortly after classes started, it became apparent that it would be necessary to choose an alternate site for students until the construction was complete. The students enrolled at Southeast spent their first semester at the school in makeshift classrooms at the Federal Aviation Administration building in OKC.

== Notable alumni ==
- Rusty Hilger – NFL
- Neal Francis Lane – Physicist, former Director of the Office of Science and Technology Policy and National Science Foundation
- Gerald McCoy – NFL
- Robert "Moose" Menefee;-NAIA National Champion 1959
- Bobby Murcer – Major League Baseball All-Star
- Darrell Porter – Major League Baseball All-Star, World Series MVP
- Mickey Tettleton – Major League Baseball All-Star
- Clendon Thomas - NFL
- Don Trull - American Football League
