= NFL Top 100 =

Television series

- Country of origin: United States
- Original language: English
- No. of seasons: 14
- No. of episodes: 140

Production
- Running time: 3–9 minutes (per player)

Original release
- Network: NFL+, NFL Network
- Release: 2011

Related
- NFL Top 10

The NFL Top 100 is an annual television series aired during the NFL offseason counting down the top one hundred players in the National Football League (NFL), as chosen by fellow NFL players. The rankings are based on an off-season poll organized by the NFL, where players vote on their peers based on their performance for the recent NFL season. Only players that are not retired in the next season are eligible for consideration.

In 2010, NFL Network aired The Top 100: NFL's Greatest Players, an all-time top 100 list, with wide receiver Jerry Rice being voted as the number-one player. The following year, the network debuted their annual NFL Top 100, with quarterback Tom Brady being voted at the top. Brady holds the record for most number-one selections, with four (2011, 2017, 2018, and 2022). Fellow quarterback Patrick Mahomes is the only other player to have been voted number-one multiple times (2021, 2023). Non-quarterbacks to be voted number-one include running back Adrian Peterson (2013), defensive end J. J. Watt (2015), defensive tackle Aaron Donald (2019), wide receiver Tyreek Hill (2024), running back Saquon Barkley (2025) and defensive end Myles Garrett (2026).

== Series overview ==
Season	Originally aired		Number 1	
Season	First aired	Last aired	Player	Team
1	April 30, 2011	July 3, 2011	Tom Brady	New England Patriots
2	April 28, 2012	June 27, 2012	Aaron Rodgers	Green Bay Packers
3	April 27, 2013	June 27, 2013	Adrian Peterson	Minnesota Vikings
4	May 10, 2014	July 9, 2014	Peyton Manning	Denver Broncos
5	May 6, 2015	July 8, 2015	J. J. Watt	Houston Texans
6	May 4, 2016	July 6, 2016	Cam Newton	Carolina Panthers
7	May 1, 2017	June 26, 2017	Tom Brady	New England Patriots
8	April 30, 2018	June 25, 2018	Tom Brady	New England Patriots
9	July 22, 2019	July 31, 2019	Aaron Donald	Los Angeles Rams
10	July 26, 2020	July 29, 2020	Lamar Jackson	Baltimore Ravens
11	August 15, 2021	August 28, 2021	Patrick Mahomes	Kansas City Chiefs
12	August 14, 2022	August 28, 2022	Tom Brady	Tampa Bay Buccaneers
13	July 24, 2023	August 3, 2023	Patrick Mahomes	Kansas City Chiefs
14	July 22, 2024	August 2, 2024	Tyreek Hill	Miami Dolphins
15	June 30, 2025	September 1, 2025	Saquon Barkley	Philadelphia Eagles
16	June 22, 2026	September 3, 2026	Myles Garrett	Los Angeles Rams

== History ==
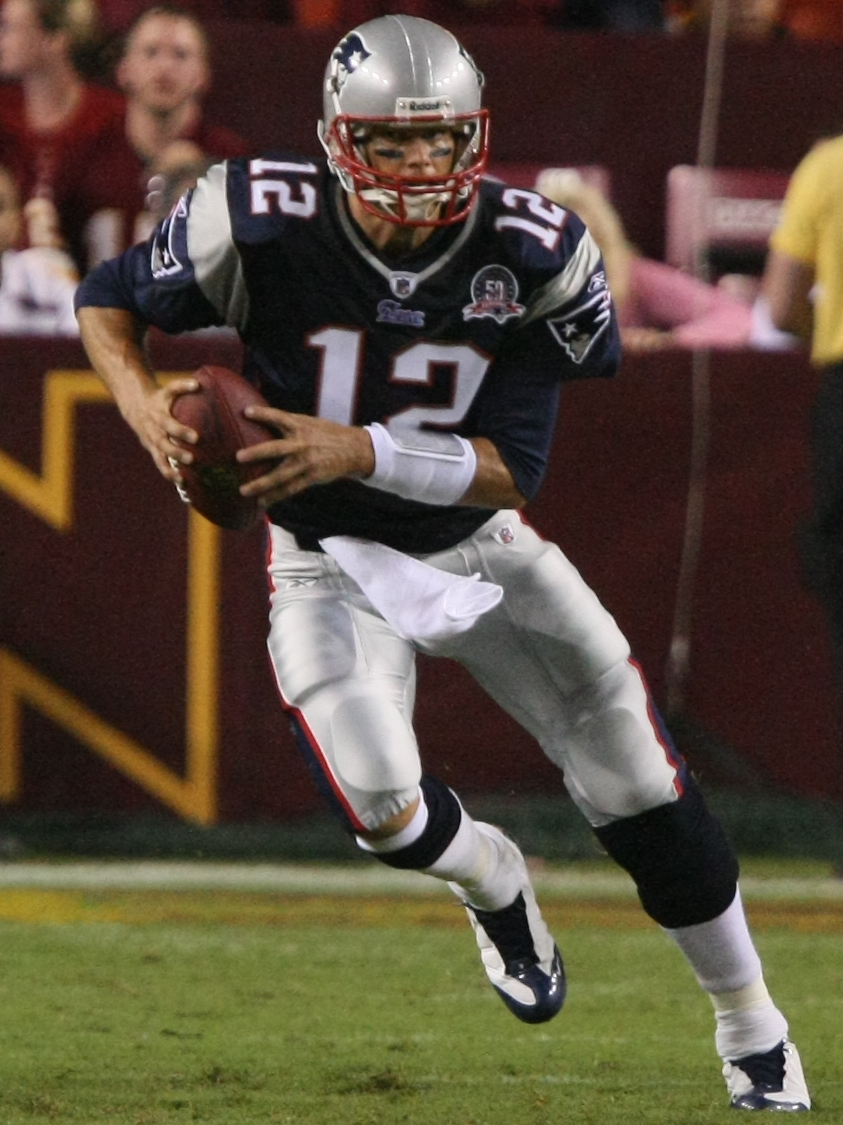
Tom Brady has been named the #1 player four times

Produced by NFL Films, the series' first season was released during the 2011 NFL offseason. The series was aired on NFL Network, which released ten episodes, each revealing ten players. The first episode, revealing the players ranked #100 through #91 was aired on April 30, 2011. The list and series began with the #100 ranked player, Washington Redskins quarterback Donovan McNabb, and ended when New England Patriots quarterback and 2010 NFL MVP Tom Brady was selected as the number one ranked player.

The NFL Top 100 list returned following the 2012 NFL season, running during the NFL's offseason. Each episode of the season was followed up by NFL Top 100 Reaction Show, which featured NFL Network analysts reacting and voicing their opinions on the ten most recent players revealed on the list. The series has run every offseason since, following the same countdown format and continuing to feature players and analysts reacting to the rankings. NFL Films have also released annual lists of ten players who just missed the Top 100 listing.

=== Players with most Top 100 selections ===
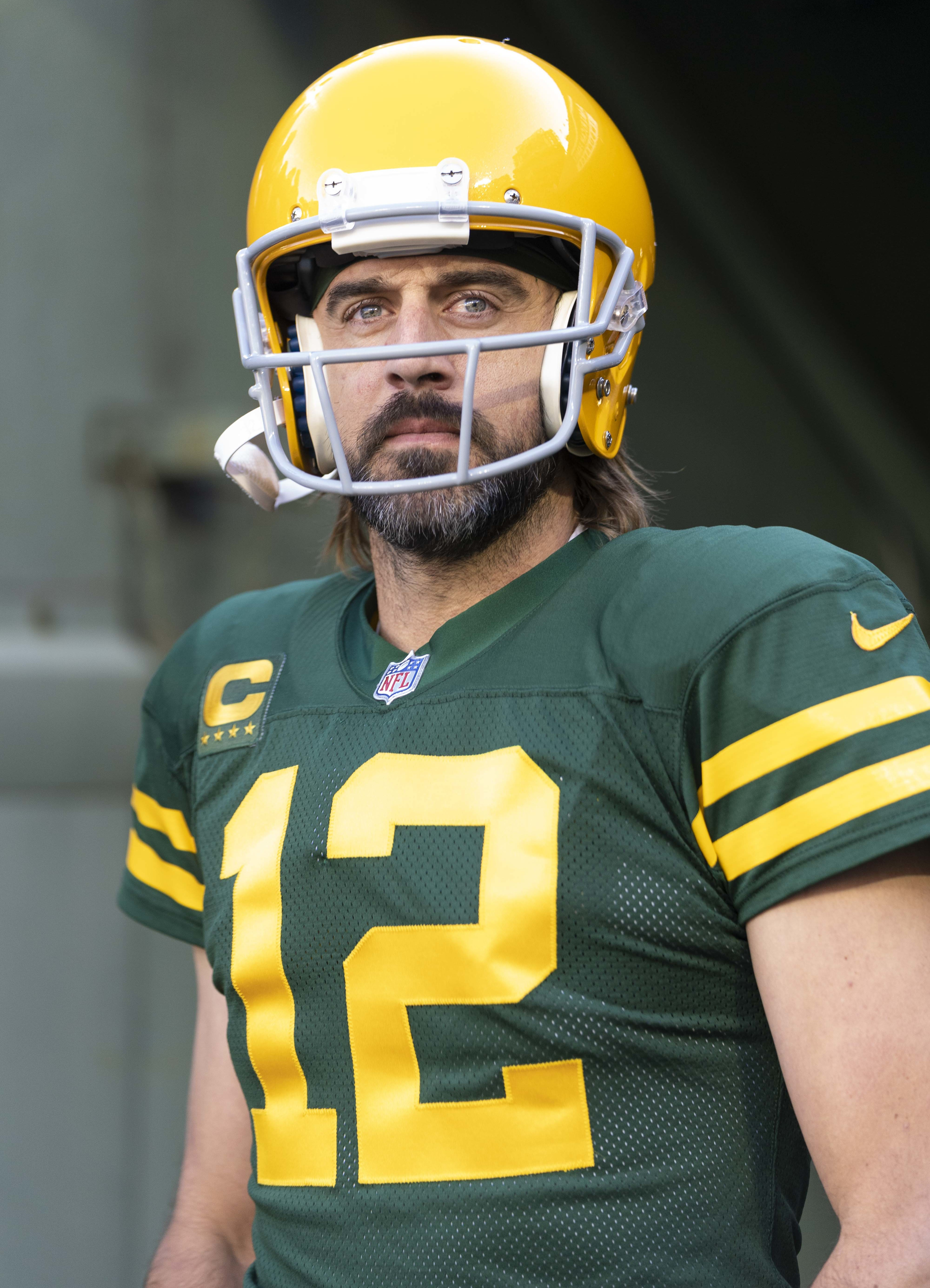
Quarterback Aaron Rodgers has been selected to the Top 100 list a record 14 times

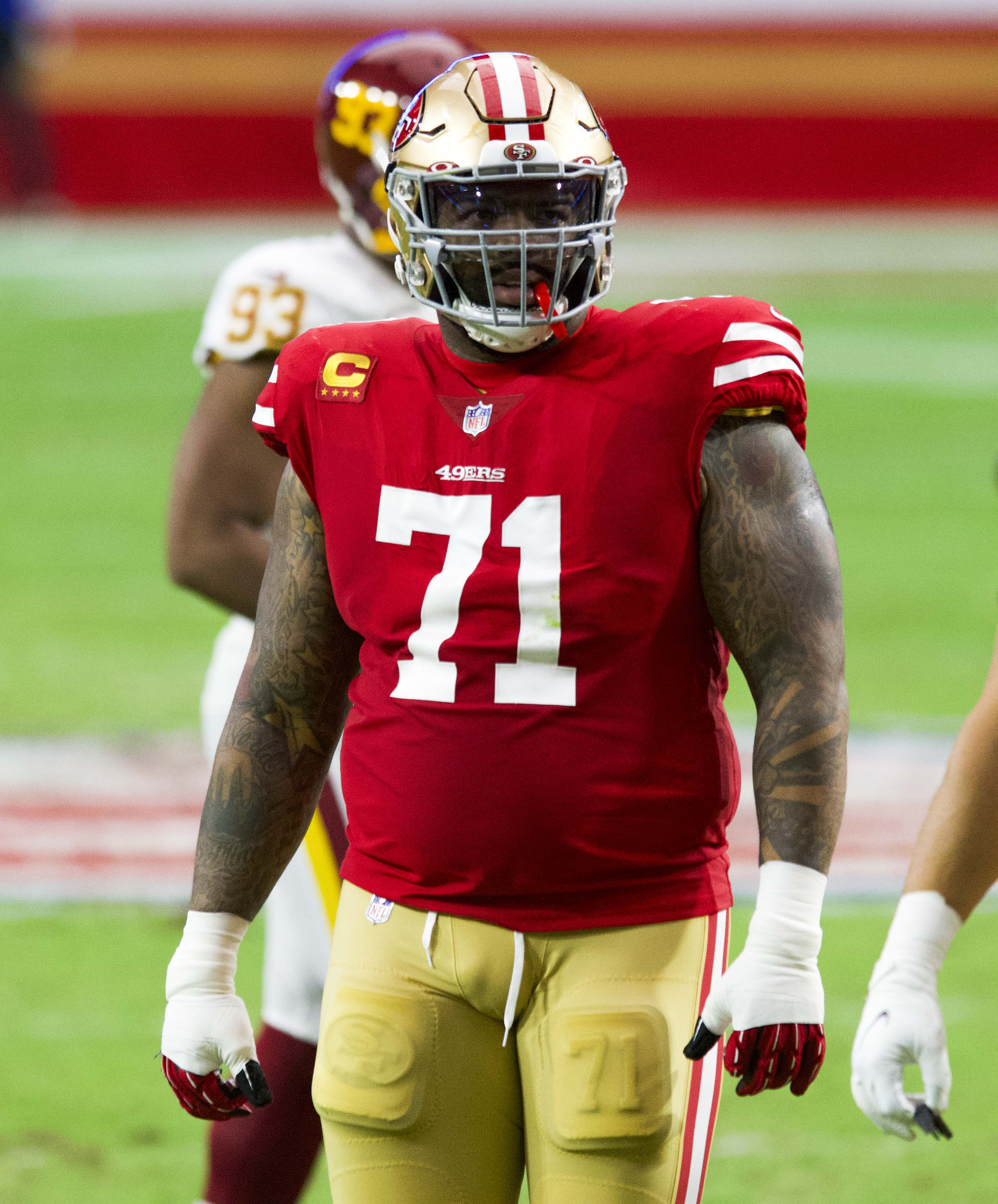
Trent Williams has the most selections for a non-quarterback (13)

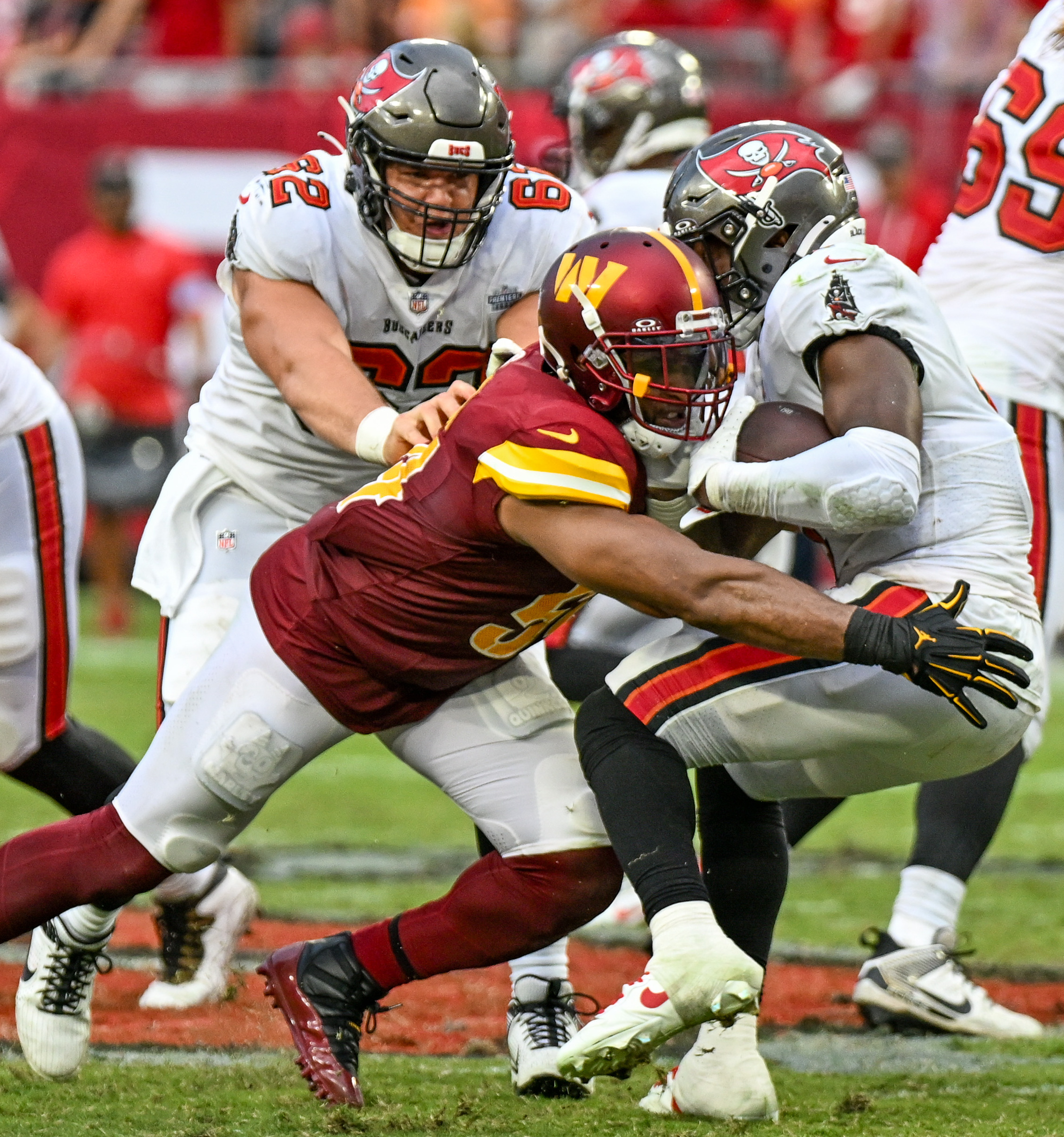
Bobby Wagner has the most selections for a defensive player (11)

Key
Symbol	Meaning
†	Denotes Pro Football Hall of Fame member
^	Denotes active player

Player	Position	#Sel.	Years selected	Peak
Aaron Rodgers^{^}	Quarterback	14	2011–2024	#1 (2012)
Trent Williams^{^}	Offensive tackle	13	2013–2019, 2021–2026	#7 (2024)
Tom Brady	Quarterback	12	2011–2022	#1 (4 times)
Travis Kelce^{^}	Tight end	11	2016–2026	#5 (2 times)
Bobby Wagner^{^}	Linebacker	11	2015, 2017–2026	#13 (2020)
Drew Brees†	Quarterback	10	2011–2020	#2 (2 times)
Larry Fitzgerald†	Wide receiver	10	2011–2020	#7 (2012)
Cameron Jordan^{^}	Defensive end	10	2014, 2016, 2018–2023, 2026	#23 (2020)
Khalil Mack^{^}	Defensive end	10	2015–2021, 2024, 2025	#3 (2019)
Von Miller^{^}	Linebacker	10	2012–2020, 2022	#2 (2017)
Russell Wilson	Quarterback	10	2013–2022	#2 (2020)
J. J. Watt	Defensive end	9	2013–2021	#1 (2015)
Aaron Donald^{^}	Defensive tackle	9	2015–2023	#1 (2019)
Ben Roethlisberger	Quarterback	9	2011–2019	#18 (2018)
Mike Evans^{^}	Wide receiver	9	2015, 2017, 2019–2025	#26 (2024)
Cameron Heyward^{^}	Defensive tackle	9	2016, 2018–2025	#42 (2022)
Tyreek Hill^{^}	Wide receiver	9	2017–2025	#1 (2024)
Cam Newton	Quarterback	8	2012–2019	#1 (2016)
Derrick Henry^{^}	Running back	8	2019–2026	#4 (2021)
Julio Jones	Wide receiver	8	2013, 2015–2021	#3 (2017)
A. J. Green	Wide receiver	8	2012–2019	#9 (2014)
Earl Thomas	Safety	8	2012–2018, 2020	#17 (2014)
Philip Rivers	Quarterback	8	2011, 2012, 2014–2019	#17 (2019)
Patrick Mahomes^{^}	Quarterback	8	2019–2026	#1 (2 times)
Patrick Peterson	Cornerback	8	2012–2019	#18 (2016)
Tyron Smith	Offensive tackle	8	2014–2020, 2022	#18 (2017)
Ndamukong Suh	Defensive tackle	8	2011–2018	#24 (2015)
Kirk Cousins^{^}	Quarterback	8	2016–2020, 2022–2024	#42 (2023)
Zack Martin	Guard	8	2017–2024	#53 (2024)
T. J. Watt^{^}	Outside linebacker	8	2019–2026	#6 (2022)

== Reception ==
Several NFL players have expressed negative opinions of NFL Top 100. Responding to the 2021 list, Arizona Cardinals offensive tackle D. J. Humphries called the list "bullshit" and "made up" and cast personal doubt on if players actually vote, stating that he had never voted. In 2022, former tackle Andrew Whitworth, a 3× NFL Top 100 selection himself, also asserted that not every player votes on the list, calling it a "joke" and "content filler".

NFL.com writer Jeremy Bergman opined that Aaron Rodgers' inclusion and Joe Flacco's near-make on the 2024 list showed that "players continue to suffer simultaneously from recency bias and a misunderstanding of what the criteria for this exercise are, if there are any".

== See also ==
- NFL 100th Anniversary All-Time Team
- The Top 100: NFL's Greatest Players
