= Gerald McCoy =

American football player (born 1988)

- McCoy in 2026

No. 93
- Position: Defensive tackle

Personal information
- Born: February 25, 1988 (age 38); Oklahoma City, Oklahoma, U.S.
- Listed height: 6 ft 4 in (1.93 m)
- Listed weight: 295 lb (134 kg)

Career information
- High school: Southeast (Oklahoma City)
- College: Oklahoma (2006–2009)
- NFL draft: 2010: 1st round, 3rd overall pick

Career history
- Tampa Bay Buccaneers (2010–2018); Carolina Panthers (2019); Dallas Cowboys (2020)*; Las Vegas Raiders (2021)
- * Offseason or practice squad member only

Awards and highlights
- First-team All-Pro (2013); 2× Second-team All-Pro (2014, 2016); 6× Pro Bowl (2012–2017); 2× First-team All-American (2008, 2009); Big 12 Defensive Freshman of the Year (2007); 2× First-team All-Big 12 (2008, 2009)

Career NFL statistics
- Total tackles: 334
- Sacks: 59.5
- Pass deflections: 24
- Forced fumbles: 6
- Fumble recoveries: 4
- Stats at Pro Football Reference

Gerald Keith McCoy Jr. (born February 25, 1988) is an American former professional football player who was a defensive tackle in the National Football League (NFL). He played college football for the Oklahoma Sooners, earning consensus All-American honors. He was selected by the Tampa Bay Buccaneers with the third overall pick of the 2010 NFL draft. McCoy has been selected to the Pro Bowl six times, and was selected to one First-team All-Pro.

== Early life ==
McCoy was born in Oklahoma City to Gerald McCoy Sr. and Patricia McCoy. He attended Southeast High School in Oklahoma City, where he played for the Southeast Spartans high school football team and competed in track. After notching 83 tackles, including 23 tackles for loss and 20 sacks, he was named All-area, all-state, and all-metro as a junior in 2004. As a senior, he logged 82 tackles, 20 sacks and recovered nine fumbles. McCoy received numerous awards including 2005 National Defensive Player of the Year by USA Today. Following his senior season, McCoy played in the 2006 U.S. Army All-American Bowl.

In track & field, McCoy was one of the state's top performers in the shot put (top-throw of 16.90 meters).

Regarded as a five-star recruit by Rivals.com, McCoy was ranked as the No. 1 defensive tackle prospect in his class. At No. 4 in the overall ranking he was the highest ranked defensive tackle since Haloti Ngata (No. 2) in 2002. Recruited by virtually every major school in the country, McCoy took official visits to Notre Dame, Southern California, Virginia Tech, Louisiana State, and Miami (FL), before committing to his home-state Sooners on National Signing Day.

== College career ==
McCoy attended the University of Oklahoma, where he played for head coach Bob Stoops's Oklahoma Sooners football team from 2006 to 2009.

=== 2007 season ===
After being redshirted for the 2006 season, the young McCoy faced high expectations. In 2007, the Big 12 named McCoy the Defensive Freshman of the Year. He finished the 2007 season with 19 tackles, 6.5 tackles for loss, and two sacks while starting and playing in 13 games.

=== 2008 season ===
In his sophomore season, McCoy led all of Oklahoma's interior defensive linemen with 30 tackles and was second on the team with 6.5 sacks. He also had career-high two sacks against Texas and his first career interception came in the BCS title game against Florida. After the season, he was named Sporting News First-team All-American, AP Second-team All- American and Big 12 Defensive Player of the Year.

=== 2009 season ===
Despite having been considered one of the top prospects for the 2009 NFL draft, McCoy chose to return to Oklahoma for his junior season. Rivals.com ranked him as the No. 2 defensive tackle in college football in 2009. McCoy finished the season playing in 15 games making 35 tackles (15.5 for losses) six sacks, two passes broken up, one forced fumble, and one fumble recovery. He was voted First-team All-American by the Walter Camp Foundation. McCoy also became the 37th Sooner player to earn All-America honors in more than one season. He was named to All-America teams by The Sporting News and Sports Illustrated after the 2008 season. On November 10, McCoy was named one of four finalists for the 2009 Lombardi Award. McCoy was the only non-senior on a list that also included Terrence Cody, Jerry Hughes, and Ndamukong Suh.

At the University of Oklahoma, McCoy was a two-time team captain that started all 40 games during his career (2007– 09), playing the three-technique right defensive tackle position. He also recorded two forced fumbles and two fumble recoveries, one interception, and four passes defensed.

== Professional career ==
=== Pre-draft ===
McCoy was considered one of the top prospects of the 2010 NFL draft. Before the draft, he was projected as either a 4–3 three-technique defensive tackle or a 3–4 defensive end at the professional level.

Pre-draft measurables
Height	Weight	Arm length	Hand span	40-yard dash	10-yard split	20-yard split	20-yard shuttle	Three-cone drill	Vertical jump	Broad jump	Bench press
6 ft 4 1/8 in (1.93 m)	295 lb (134 kg)	33 3/4 in (0.86 m)	10 1/4 in (0.26 m)	4.99 s	1.68 s	2.85 s	4.48 s	7.32 s	30 1/2 in (0.77 m)	9 ft 6 in (2.90 m)	23 reps
All values from NFL Combine

=== Tampa Bay Buccaneers ===
==== 2010 season ====
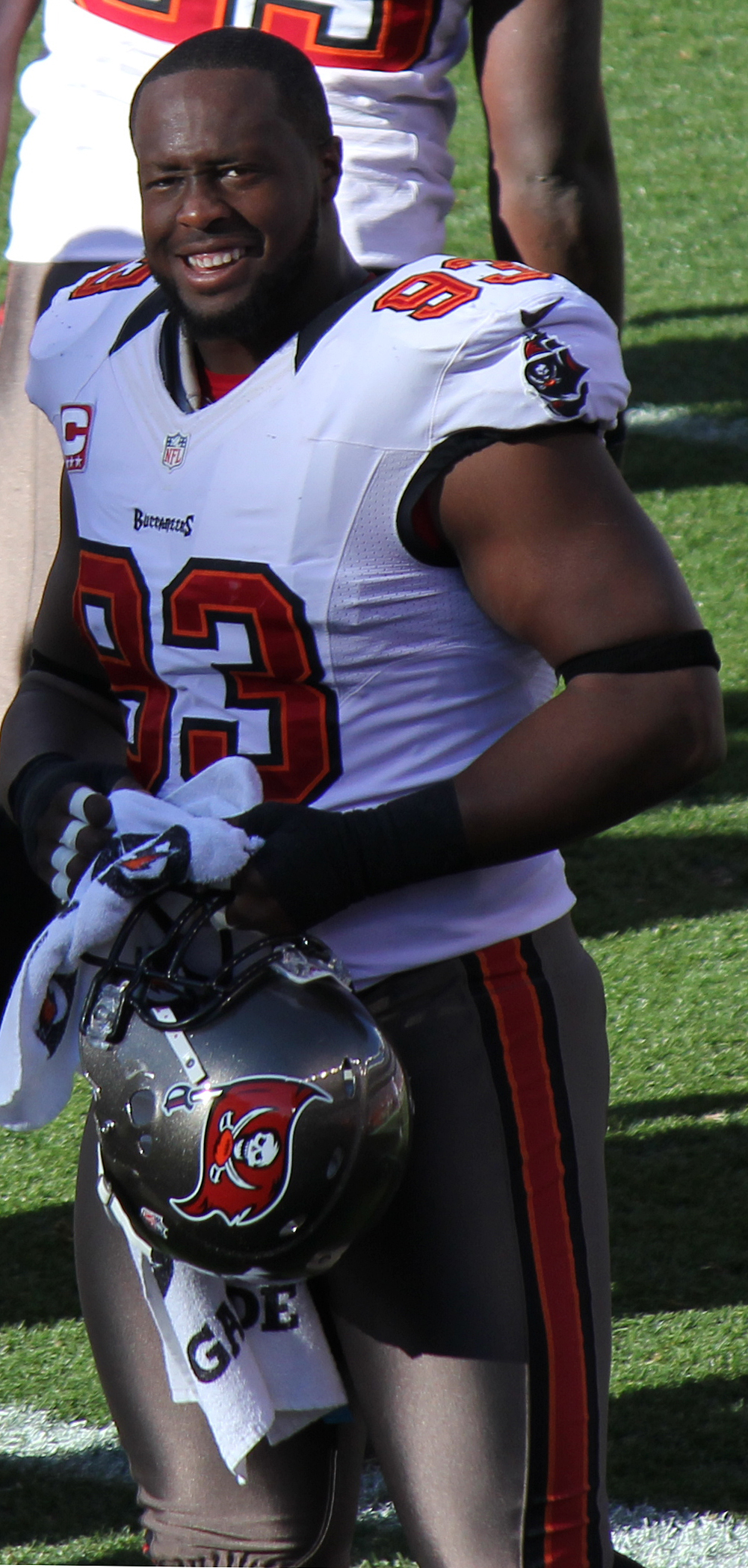
McCoy with the Tampa Bay Buccaneers in 2012

McCoy was selected by the Tampa Bay Buccaneers in the first round with the third overall pick of the 2010 NFL draft (as projected, to play 3-technique defensive tackle). He was the highest selected Sooners defender since Tony Casillas went to the Atlanta Falcons in 1986. He was also the second of three Oklahoma Sooners drafted in the first four picks of the 2010 NFL Draft, marking the first time in NFL history that one college has had three players selected among the first four picks. Quarterback Sam Bradford was selected by the St. Louis Rams with the 1st pick and Offensive Tackle Trent Williams was selected by the Washington Redskins with the 4th pick. McCoy and the Buccaneers agreed to a five-year, $63 million contract on July 31, 2010.

McCoy made his NFL debut against the Cleveland Browns on September 12, 2010. The Buccaneers won the game 17–14, thanks in large part to a great defensive performance that saw McCoy make three tackles while forcing a fumble. McCoy also became just the fifth defensive rookie to start for the Buccaneers on opening day since 1995 when Warren Sapp played against the Philadelphia Eagles in a 21–6 victory. McCoy recorded his first NFL sack against the San Francisco 49ers on November 21, 2010. In the game, the Bucs shut out the Niners 21–0 for their first win in Candlestick Park since 1980. His first multi-sack game came a week later, on November 28, 2010, when he sacked quarterback Joe Flacco of the Baltimore Ravens twice. The Buccaneers ended up losing that game 17 to 10 despite a strong defensive performance. On December 12, 2010, McCoy suffered a torn left biceps, causing the team to place him on IR two days later.

McCoy finished 2010 tied for third on the Buccaneers with 3.0 sacks, tied for fourth on the team with 6.0 tackles for loss and ranked second with 17 quarterback pressures during his rookie season, despite missing the final three games.

==== 2011 season ====
In his second season in the NFL, McCoy once again was limited by injuries and played in only 11 games.

McCoy was placed on injured reserve on November 7, 2011, after tearing his right biceps during the opening quarter of a 27–16 loss to New Orleans that dropped the Bucs (4–4) into third place in the NFC South. He had just returned to the lineup after sitting out the previous two games because on an ankle injury.

It was the second straight year McCoy's season ended prematurely because of an arm injury. The Bucs finished their struggling 2011 season on a 10-game losing streak which led to the firing of head coach Raheem Morris.

==== 2012 season ====
McCoy bounced back in 2012, having a significant impact on the Bucs' top-ranked rushing defense and earning his first Pro Bowl berth in his first season un-marred by injury.

"I just wanted to play a full season," McCoy said. "This is definitely a gift from God. God has outdone himself with this."My goal was to be my best for my team. But by doing that, I was able to accomplish that and show people that I can play a little football." Receiver Vincent Jackson and running back Doug Martin were named alternates for the Pro Bowl, joining their teammate McCoy. His stats on the year were 30 tackles (at least 10 tackles for a loss), five sacks, and 1 forced fumble.

==== 2013 season ====
Just keep on pushing, man. Don't ever give up. Don't listen to the naysayers and stay away from the dream killers, people who tell you you can't do it or you don't have it or this team isn't this or this team isn't that. That's all from the outside looking in. Us on the inside of those four walls, we never stopped believing and we haven't stopped believing. We kept preparing the same every week and we just persevered.

— Gerald McCoy

McCoy began the 2013 season in good form, registering 2 sacks and a fumble recovery by Week 4. McCoy continued his strong season with a big game against the Miami Dolphins in Week 10. He recorded 5 tackles including 2 for a loss, and also sacked Miami Quarterback Ryan Tannehill. McCoy enjoyed the most productive day of his career in Week 11 of the 2013 season. Registering 6 tackles, 3 sacks and a pass deflection at home against the Atlanta Falcons, tying a franchise single-game sack record for a defensive tackle with Warren Sapp and Brad Culpepper. McCoy was voted to his second consecutive Pro Bowl in 2013. He finished the season with 50 total tackles, nine sacks, eight tackles for loss, four passes defended, and a fumble recovery. He was ranked by Pro Football Focus as the NFL's Best Defensive Tackle for the 2013 NFL Season. McCoy was named first-team All-Pro by the associated press along with teammate Lavonte David.

==== 2014 season ====
McCoy and the Bucs entered the 2014 season with a new head coach, Lovie Smith—McCoy's third coach in 5 NFL seasons. After continuing his strong play and being a stand out leader of the Bucs defense McCoy and Tampa Bay were working on a new deal. On October 25, 2014, McCoy signed a 7-year extension worth $98 million, and $51.5 million guaranteed. At the time, it was the biggest contract ever for a defensive tackle. During week 15 against the Carolina Panthers McCoy injured his knee and was placed on Injured reserve the following Tuesday ending his 2014 season with 35 combined tackles, 28 solo tackles, 8.5 sacks, and one forced fumble. Despite his injury he was selected to his third consecutive Pro Bowl.

==== 2015 season ====
Despite dealing with hand and shoulder ailments throughout the season McCoy was still able to produce 34 combined tackles and 8.5 sacks which resulted in his fourth consecutive selection to the Pro Bowl. He was ranked 63rd by his fellow players on the NFL Top 100 Players of 2016.

==== 2016 season ====
In the 2016 season, McCoy recorded seven sacks, 34 tackles, five passes defended, two forced fumbles, and two fumble recoveries. He was named to his fifth-straight Pro Bowl and was named second-team All-Pro. He was also ranked 52nd on the NFL Top 100 Players of 2017.

==== 2017 season ====
On December 19, 2017, McCoy was named to his sixth straight Pro Bowl. He finished the 2017 season with six sacks, 47 tackles, and one pass defended in 15 games.

==== 2018 season ====
In the 2018 season, McCoy finished with six sacks, 28 tackles, and one pass defended. He was ranked 75th by his fellow players on the NFL Top 100 Players of 2019. On May 20, 2019, McCoy was released by the Buccaneers after spending nine seasons with the team.

=== Carolina Panthers ===
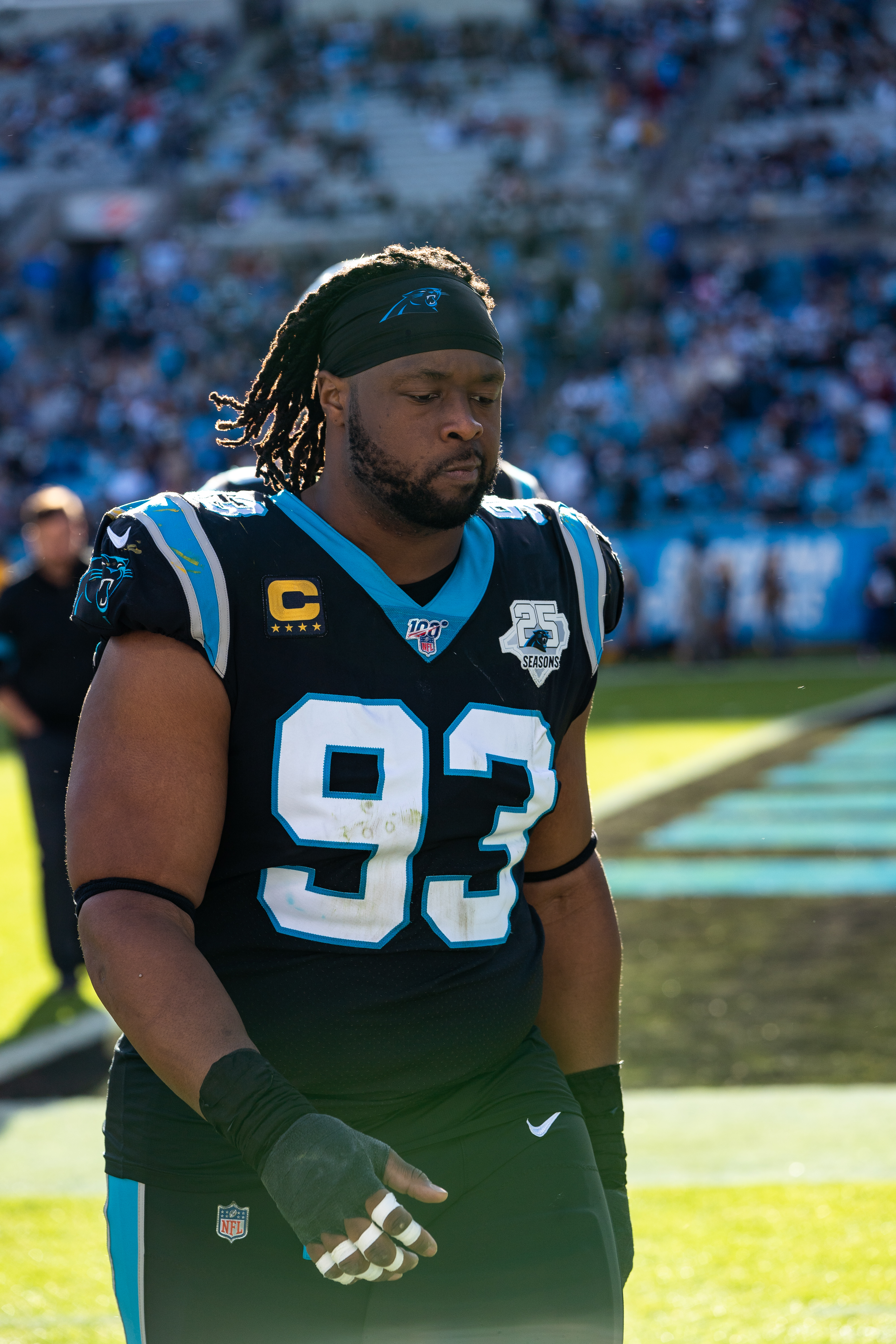
McCoy with the Carolina Panthers in 2019

On June 3, 2019, McCoy signed with the Carolina Panthers. In week 6 against the Tampa Bay Buccaneers, McCoy sacked former teammate Jameis Winston 2.5 times in the 37–26 win. He finished the 2019 season with five sacks, 37 tackles, and two passes defended.

=== Dallas Cowboys ===
On March 31, 2020, McCoy signed a three-year contract with the Dallas Cowboys. After suffering a ruptured quadriceps injury in practice, he was released by the Cowboys on August 18, through an injury waiver clause in his contract.

=== Las Vegas Raiders ===
On August 4, 2021, McCoy signed with the Las Vegas Raiders. He suffered a season-ending left knee injury in the season opener against the Baltimore Ravens. McCoy was placed on injured reserve on September 15. He was suspended six games for violating the league's policy on performance-enhancing substances on September 29. McCoy served the suspension without pay while on the team's reserve/injured list.

=== Retirement ===
After not playing in 2022, McCoy announced his retirement from the NFL on April 14, 2023. He joined NFL Network as an analyst on September 5.

== Career statistics ==
=== NFL ===
Year	Team	Games		Tackles				Interceptions						Fumbles			
Year	Team	GP	GS	Cmb	Solo	Ast	Sck	PD	Int	Yds	Avg	Lng	TD	FF	FR	Yds	TD
2010	TB	13	13	28	22	6	3.0	5	0	0	0.0	0	0	2	0	0	0
2011	TB	6	6	11	10	1	1.0	0	0	0	0.0	0	0	0	0	0	0
2012	TB	16	16	30	23	7	5.0	2	0	0	0.0	0	0	1	1	0	0
2013	TB	16	16	50	35	15	9.5	4	0	0	0.0	0	0	0	1	12	0
2014	TB	13	13	35	28	7	8.5	3	0	0	0.0	0	0	1	0	0	0
2015	TB	15	15	34	26	8	8.5	1	0	0	0.0	0	0	0	0	0	0
2016	TB	15	15	34	26	8	7.0	5	0	0	0.0	0	0	2	2	0	0
2017	TB	15	15	47	33	14	6.0	1	0	0	0.0	0	0	0	0	0	0
2018	TB	14	14	28	17	11	6.0	1	0	0	0.0	0	0	0	0	0	0
2019	CAR	16	16	37	15	22	5.0	2	0	0	0.0	0	0	0	0	0	0
2021	LV	1	0	0	0	0	0.0	0	0	0	0.0	0	0	0	0	0	0
Total		140	139	334	235	99	59.5	24	0	0	0.0	0	0	6	4	12	0

=== College ===
Season	Team	GP	Tackles				Interceptions						Fumbles	
Season	Team	GP	Cmb	Solo	Ast	Sck	Int	Yds	Avg	Lng	TD	PD	FF	FR
2007	Oklahoma	13	19	10	9	2.0	0	0	0.0	0	0	0	1	0
2008	Oklahoma	14	30	16	14	6.5	1	12	12.0	12	0	2	0	0
2009	Oklahoma	13	34	25	9	6.0	0	0	0.0	0	0	2	1	0
Career		40	83	51	32	14.5	1	12	12.0	12	0	4	2	0

== Personal life ==
McCoy majored in human relations at the University of Oklahoma. In May 2012, McCoy was presented with the 2012 Pop Warner Little Scholars 'Inspiration to Youth' Award at Pop Warner's annual All-American Scholastic Banquet in Orlando, Florida. In September 2012, McCoy helped present a $100,000 check to build Tampa Bay Buccaneers Field in Clearwater's North Greenwood community, where McCoy and teammates also led local youths through football drills. Gerald McCoy is married to Ebony McCoy, and the couple have five children. McCoy also appeared, along with J. J. Watt and NaVorro Bowman, in The League, a TV series centered around a fantasy football league, for Episode 2 of Season 5.
