= NFL sacks leaders =

NFL sacks leaders may refer to:

- List of NFL annual sacks leaders
- List of NFL career sacks leaders
