= List of NFL annual leaders =

List of NFL annual leaders may refer to:

- List of NFL annual forced fumbles leaders
- List of NFL annual interceptions leaders
- List of NFL annual kickoff return yards leaders
- List of NFL annual pass completion percentage leaders
- List of NFL annual passer rating leaders
- List of NFL annual passing touchdowns leaders
- List of NFL annual passing yards leaders
- List of NFL annual punt return yards leaders
- List of NFL annual punting yards leaders
- List of NFL annual receiving touchdowns leaders
- List of NFL annual receiving yards leaders
- List of NFL annual receptions leaders
- List of NFL annual rushing touchdowns leaders
- List of NFL annual rushing yards leaders
- List of NFL annual sacks leaders
- List of NFL annual scoring leaders
- List of NFL annual tackles leaders
