= T. J. Watt =

American football player (born 1994)

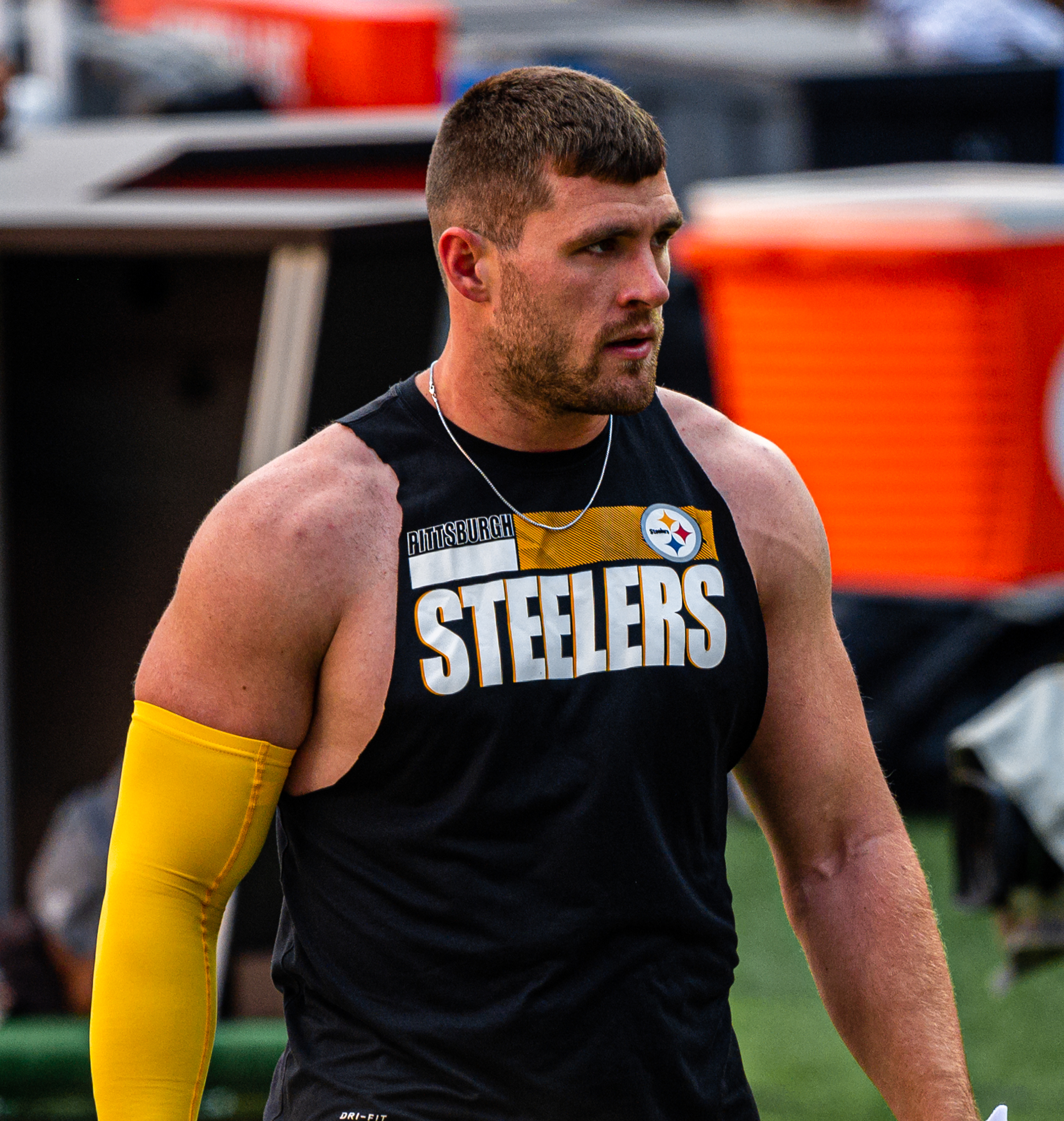
- Watt with the Pittsburgh Steelers in 2021

No. 90 – Pittsburgh Steelers
- Position: Outside linebacker
- Roster status: Active

Personal information
- Born: October 11, 1994 (age 32); Pewaukee, Wisconsin, U.S.
- Listed height: 6 ft 4 in (1.93 m)
- Listed weight: 252 lb (114 kg)

Career information
- High school: Pewaukee
- College: Wisconsin (2013–2016)
- NFL draft: 2017: 1st round, 30th overall pick

Career history
- Pittsburgh Steelers (2017–present)

Awards and highlights
- NFL Defensive Player of the Year (2021); 4× First-team All-Pro (2019–2021, 2023); 2× Second-team All-Pro (2019 (Note: Selected as a linebacker), 2024); 8× Pro Bowl (2018–2025); 3× Deacon Jones Award (2020, 2021, 2023); 2× NFL forced fumbles leader (2019, 2024); Butkus Award (pro) (2020); PFWA All-Rookie Team (2017); Second-team All-American (2016); First-team All-Big Ten (2016); NFL records: Seasons leading NFL in sacks: 3; Consec. seasons leading NFL in sacks: 2 (Note: Tied with Mark Gastineau and Reggie White)

Career NFL statistics as of Week 11, 2026
- Total tackles: 540
- Sacks: 122.5
- Forced fumbles: 37
- Fumble recoveries: 15
- Interceptions: 10
- Pass deflections: 61
- Defensive touchdowns: 2
- Stats at Pro Football Reference

Trent Jordan Watt (born October 11, 1994) is an American professional football outside linebacker for the Pittsburgh Steelers of the National Football League (NFL). He played college football for the Wisconsin Badgers for four years. After redshirting his freshman year, Watt injured his knee in his sophomore year, keeping him out until the 2015 season. Watt broke out in 2016, recording 11.5 sacks and receiving various collegiate honors. After foregoing his last year of college eligibility, Watt was selected by the Steelers in the first round of the 2017 NFL draft.

Watt played in at least 15 games each of his first five seasons with the Steelers, before injuries limited him to 10 games in 2022. In 2021, he recorded 22.5 sacks to match the single-season NFL record set by Michael Strahan in 2001, surpassed by Myles Garrett in 2025. Watt became the second fastest player in NFL history to record 100 sacks, behind Reggie White. He was a finalist for the NFL Defensive Player of the Year award five times (2019–2021, 2023, 2024), winning in 2021. He is the younger brother of three-time NFL Defensive Player of the Year J. J. Watt and former fullback Derek Watt.

== Early life ==
Trent Jordan Watt was born on October 11, 1994, in Pewaukee, Wisconsin. He is the youngest of three sons of Connie and John Watt. His father was a firefighter for more than 25 years and his mother was the vice president of an independent inspections company. He attended Pewaukee High School, and was rated a three-star prospect by various recruiting services. While playing for the Pirates, Watt received first-team All-Conference honors at four different positions (defensive end, tight end, quarterback and punter). He would later have his number retired. Watt also participated in track and field in high school, and was the 2013 state champion in the shot put.

== College career ==
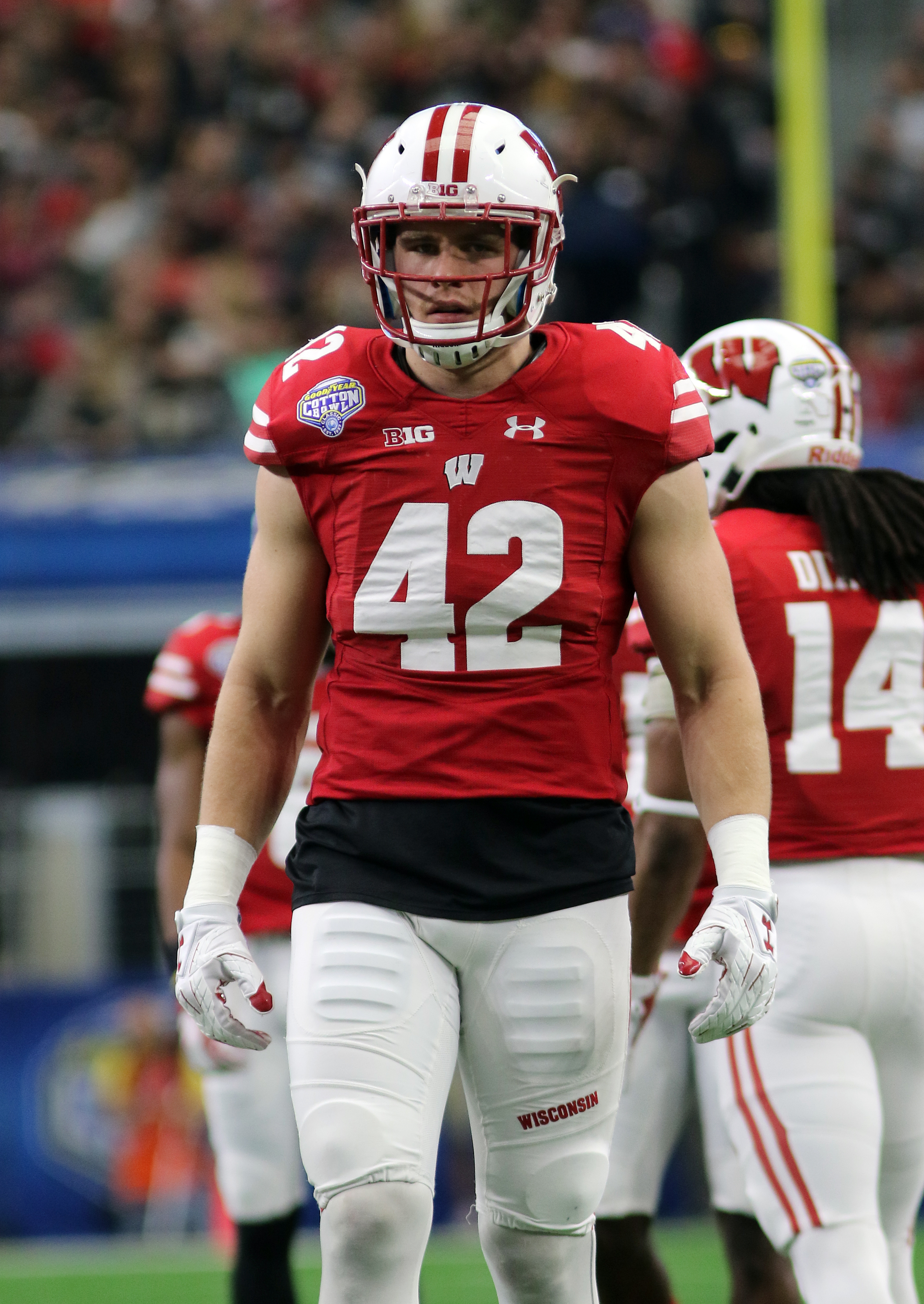
Watt with the Wisconsin Badgers in 2017

Watt enrolled at the University of Wisconsin–Madison in 2013, starting his college career as a tight end for the Wisconsin Badgers. He was redshirted in 2013 and missed the entire 2014 season due to a knee injury.

In July 2015, Watt was asked by head coach Paul Chryst to switch to a defensive position as a redshirt sophomore. Badgers' outside linebackers coach Tim Tibesar recalled Watt's position change, saying, "At that time, even though he was in his third fall at Wisconsin, it was kind of like having a freshman come in. You're trying to teach him for the first time how to play outside 'backer in our system." Watt had not played in a football game since October 2012, during his senior year of high school. He played in all 13 games for the Badgers in 2015, posting four solo tackles, four assisted tackles, and three pass breakups.

After the fourth game of his junior season in 2016, he led the Big Ten Conference in sacks. In the Michigan State game, he was named the Big Ten Player of the Week and was given the Walter Camp National Defensive Player of the Week Award. Overall in 2016, Watt recorded 63 total tackles and 11.5 sacks. Additionally, he recorded an interception and a defensive touchdown during the Badgers' game against Purdue. Watt also received first-team All-American honors by Sports Illustrated and second-team honors by the Associated Press for his play during the 2016 season. On November 29, 2016, he was named first-team All-Big Ten. On January 3, 2017, Watt announced on Twitter that he would forgo his senior season and enter the 2017 NFL draft.

During his time at Wisconsin, Watt majored in retailing and consumer behavior. He received Academic All-Big Ten honors in 2015 and 2016.

== Professional career ==
=== Pre-draft ===
Watt received an invitation to the NFL Scouting Combine as one of the top edge rushers in the draft and completed all the combine drills. Among linebackers, Watt finished second in the vertical jump and three-cone drill, tied for first in the broad jump (with Jabrill Peppers), and also tied for first in the short shuttle. He attended Wisconsin's pro day, along with Dare Ogunbowale, Vince Biegel, Corey Clement, Sojourn Shelton, and six other teammates. Green Bay Packers' general manager Ted Thompson and Pittsburgh Steelers' head coach Mike Tomlin were among the 65 team representatives and scouts present for his pro day as Steelers' linebacker's coach Joey Porter, Carolina Panthers' and New York Jets' outside linebackers coach Kevin Greene led Watt's positional drills. The majority of NFL draft experts and analysts projected Watt to be a late first round or second round pick. He was ranked the second best outside linebacker in the draft by NFLDraftScout.com, ranked the fourth best outside linebacker by NFL analyst Bucky Brooks, and was ranked the ninth best edge rusher by Sports Illustrated. ESPN also ranked Watt the 44th best prospect available in the 2017 draft.

Pre-draft measurables
Height	Weight	Arm length	Hand span	Wingspan	40-yard dash	10-yard split	20-yard shuttle	Three-cone drill	Vertical jump	Broad jump	Bench press
6 ft 4 1/2 in (1.94 m)	252 lb (114 kg)	33 1/8 in (0.84 m)	11 in (0.28 m)	6 ft 6 7/8 in (2.00 m)	4.69 s	1.61 s	4.13 s	6.79 s	37 in (0.94 m)	10 ft 8 in (3.25 m)	21 reps
All values from NFL Combine

=== 2017 ===
The Pittsburgh Steelers selected Watt in the first round with the 30th overall pick in the 2017 NFL draft. Watt was the fourth linebacker selected and the second outside linebacker. He was also the fourth linebacker taken in the first round by the Steelers since 2013. On June 14, 2017, the Steelers signed Watt to a fully guaranteed, four-year, $9.25 million contract with a signing bonus of $4.87 million. Despite his collegiate number 42 being available and the NFL allowing linebackers to wear jersey numbers in the 40s two years prior, Watt instead opted for number 90, feeling at the time he could fill out the number better as an outside linebacker than 42 as well as it being a more traditional number for a linebacker.

He entered training camp competing with James Harrison for the starting right outside linebacker position. Watt was named the Steelers' starting right outside linebacker to begin the regular season. Watt saw action in the NFL for the first time in the team's first preseason game against the New York Giants, where he made two sacks in the 20–12 victory.

Watt made his professional regular season debut and first NFL start in the Steelers' season-opener against the Cleveland Browns on September 10, 2017, where he recorded seven combined tackles, two sacks, and intercepted a pass from quarterback DeShone Kizer, as the Steelers won by a score of 21–18. He became the first rookie to start at linebacker for the Steelers since Aaron Jones in 1988. The following week, he assisted on two tackles before leaving during the first half of the Steelers' 26–9 victory over the Minnesota Vikings with a groin injury. Due to the groin injury he sustained against the Vikings, Watt was declared out for Week 3 against the Chicago Bears. On October 22, 2017, Watt had six combined tackles and sacked Cincinnati Bengals quarterback Andy Dalton, his fourth of the season, during the Steelers' 29–14 victory. On December 10, 2017, Watt recorded his first career forced fumble when he sacked Baltimore Ravens quarterback Joe Flacco with 10 seconds remaining in the game. The ball went out of bounds, but the game clock continued to run. Both teams seemed unaware of this until referees declared that the game was over. Watt finished his rookie season with 54 combined tackles (40 solo), seven pass deflections, seven sacks, one forced fumble, and an interception in 15 games. He was named to the PFWA All-Rookie Team.

The Steelers finished atop the AFC North with a 13–3 record and earned a playoff berth. On January 14, 2018, Watt started his first NFL playoff game and recorded two combined tackles and deflected a pass in a 45–42 loss to the Jacksonville Jaguars in the American Football Conference (AFC) Divisional Round.

=== 2018 ===
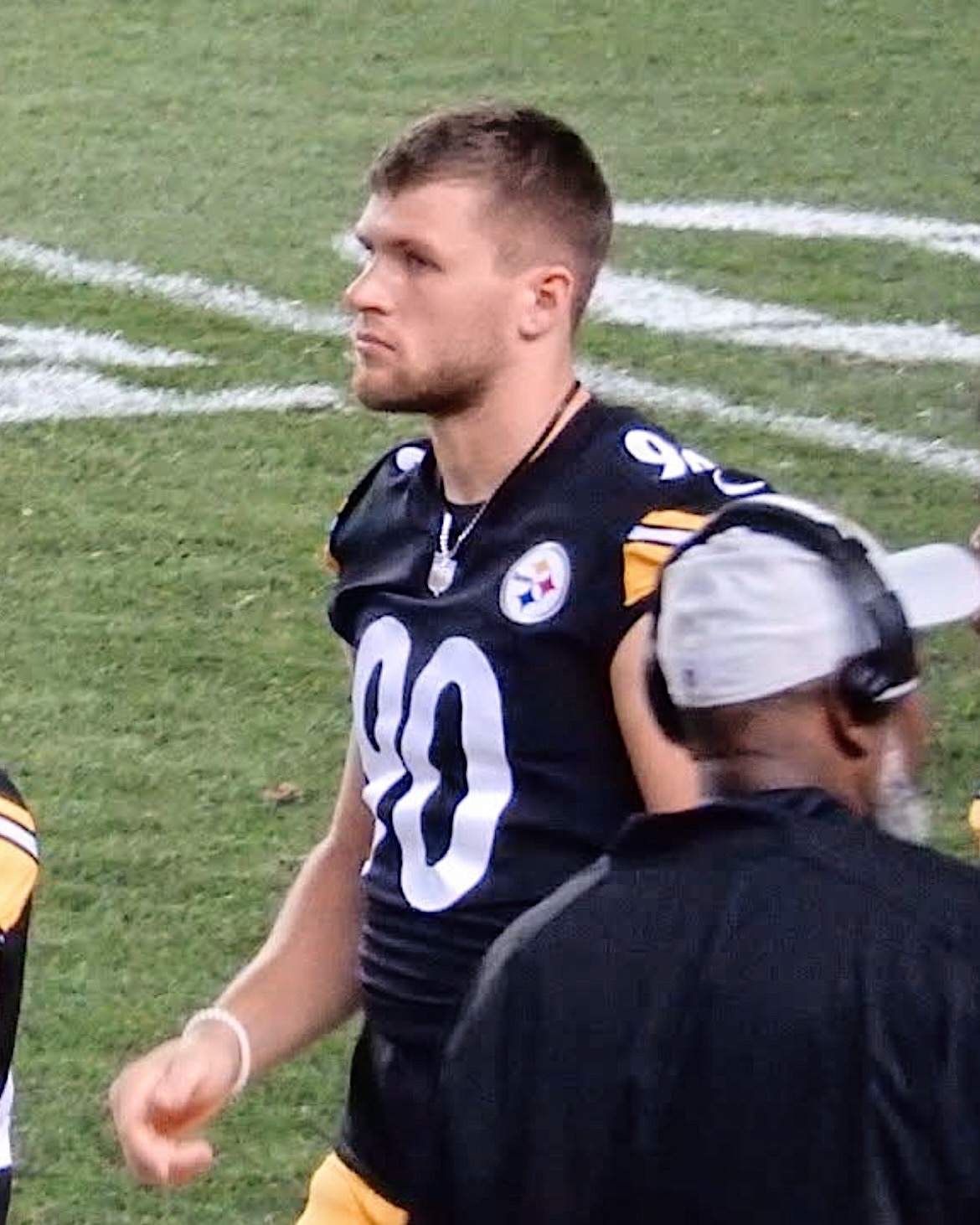
Watt during a pre-season game in 2018

Watt entered training camp slated as a starting left outside linebacker. Head coach Mike Tomlin named Watt and Bud Dupree, who was now on the right side, the starting outside linebackers to begin the season.

Watt started in the season-opener at the Browns and recorded a season-high ten combined tackles (seven solo), three sacks, and blocked a field goal, the first of his career, during overtime in a 21–21 tie. He earned AFC Defensive Player of the Week for his performance. On October 7, 2018, Watt recorded eight combined tackles, tied his season-high of three sacks, and forced a fumble in the Steelers' 41–17 win against the Atlanta Falcons. His performance earned him his second AFC Defensive Player of the Week award of the year. On November 18, he had two strip sacks of Blake Bortles during a 20–16 win over the Jacksonville Jaguars. He later replicated his performance during December 30's game against the Cincinnati Bengals. In the same game, Watt recorded four solo tackles with three assisted tackles as the Steelers won their final game of the season with a score of 16–13.

He started in all 16 games in 2018 and recorded 68 combined tackles (50 solo), 13 sacks, six forced fumbles, and three pass deflections. He was named to his first ever Pro Bowl following the season. After the season, Watt was ranked 93rd on the NFL Top 100 Players of 2018.

=== 2019 ===
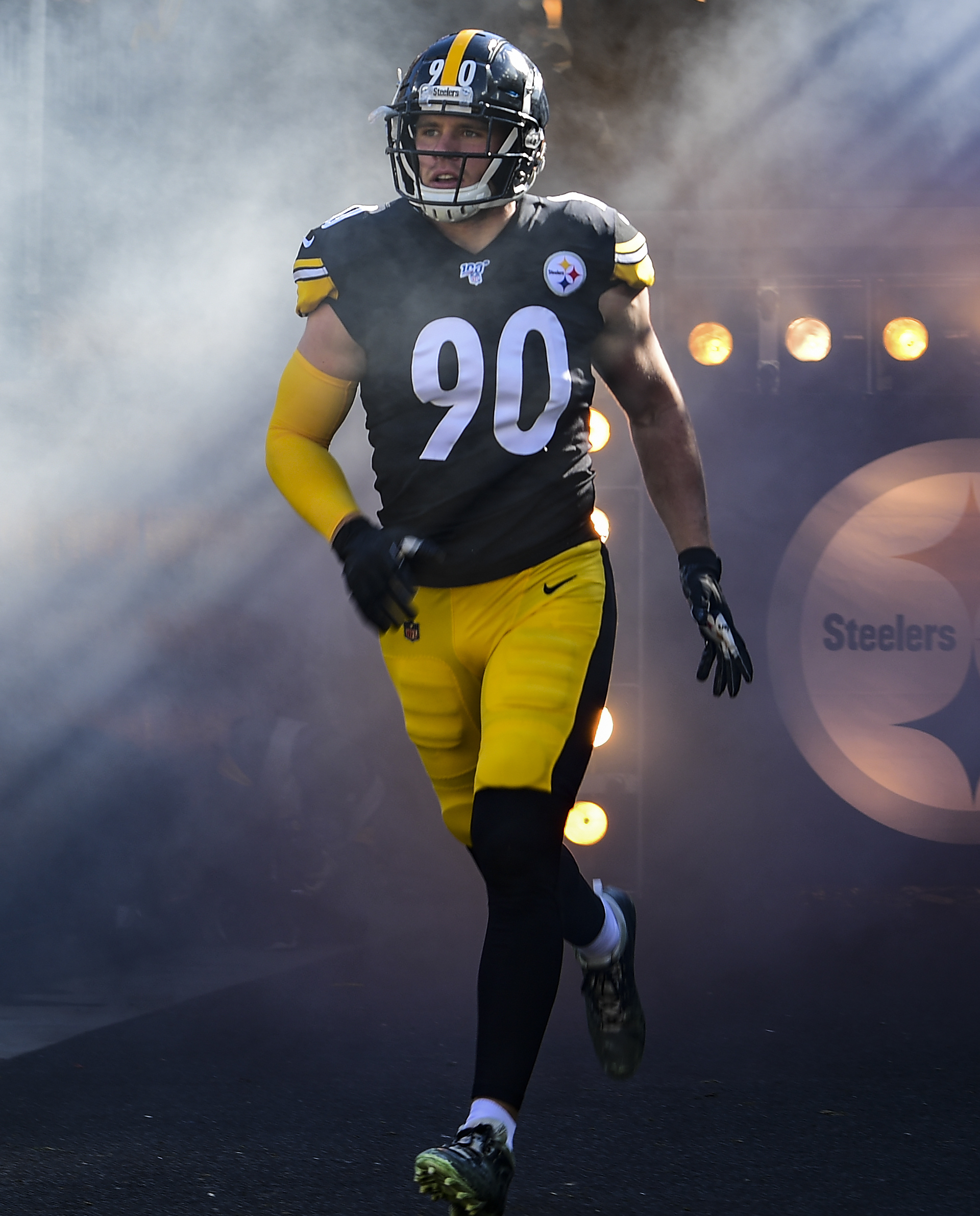
Watt running through the tunnel at Heinz Field in 2019

In Week 2 against the Seattle Seahawks, Watt recorded six tackles and made his first sack of the season on Russell Wilson in the 28–26 loss. In Week 3 against the San Francisco 49ers, Watt had an interception off Jimmy Garoppolo, and also recorded a fumble recovery in the 24–20 loss. In Week 8 against the Miami Dolphins, Watt recorded two sacks on Ryan Fitzpatrick, one of which was a strip sack that he forced and recovered, in the 27–14 win. For his performance in November, Watt earned AFC Defensive Player of the Month. In Week 14 against the Arizona Cardinals, Watt recorded an interception in the end zone off a pass thrown by Kyler Murray during the 23–17 win.

By the end of his third season, Watt had established himself as one of the best pass-rushers in the NFL, tallying an AFC-high 14.5 sacks, along with tying Chandler Jones for the league lead with eight forced fumbles. He was named to the Pro Bowl. He was voted Team MVP by his teammates, being the first defensive player to win the award since Troy Polamalu in 2010. Watt was voted All-Pro as both edge rusher (1st Team) and linebacker (2nd Team). He was also nominated for the NFL Defensive Player of the Year award, finishing third in voting. Following the season, Watt was ranked 25th by his fellow players on the NFL Top 100 Players of 2020.

=== 2020 ===
On March 17, 2020, the Steelers signed Watt's older brother Derek, putting the two brothers on the same team. On April 28, 2020, the Steelers exercised the fifth-year option on Watt's contract.

In Week 1 against the Giants, Watt recorded an interception off a pass thrown by Daniel Jones during the Steelers 26–16 win. In Week 2 against the Denver Broncos, Watt recorded 2.5 sacks on Jeff Driskel during the 26–21 win. He was named the AFC Defensive Player of the Week for his performance in Week 2. On October 1, 2020, Watt was named the AFC Defensive Player of the Month for his performance in September. In Week 10 against the Cincinnati Bengals, Watt recorded two sacks on rookie quarterback Joe Burrow during the 36–10 win. In Week 12 against the Baltimore Ravens, Watt recorded two sacks on Robert Griffin III during the 19–14 win. Watt was named the AFC Defensive Player of the Month for his performance in November. In Week 16 against the Indianapolis Colts, Watt recorded two sacks on Philip Rivers, including a strip sack that was recovered by teammate Mike Hilton, during the 28–24 comeback win. On December 31, 2020, for the second straight season, Watt was voted Team MVP by his teammates.

Despite leading the NFL in sacks (15), tackles for loss (23) and quarterback hits (41), he finished second in voting for the NFL Defensive Player of the Year award. Watt played in the Steelers lone playoff game, recording three combined tackles and deflected a pass as the Steelers lost to the Browns 48–37 in the AFC Wild Card Round. He earned Pro Bowl and first-team All-Pro honors, and was named the professional winner of the Butkus Award. Prior to the upcoming season, Watt's peers voted him ninth on the NFL Top 100 Players of 2021.

=== 2021 ===
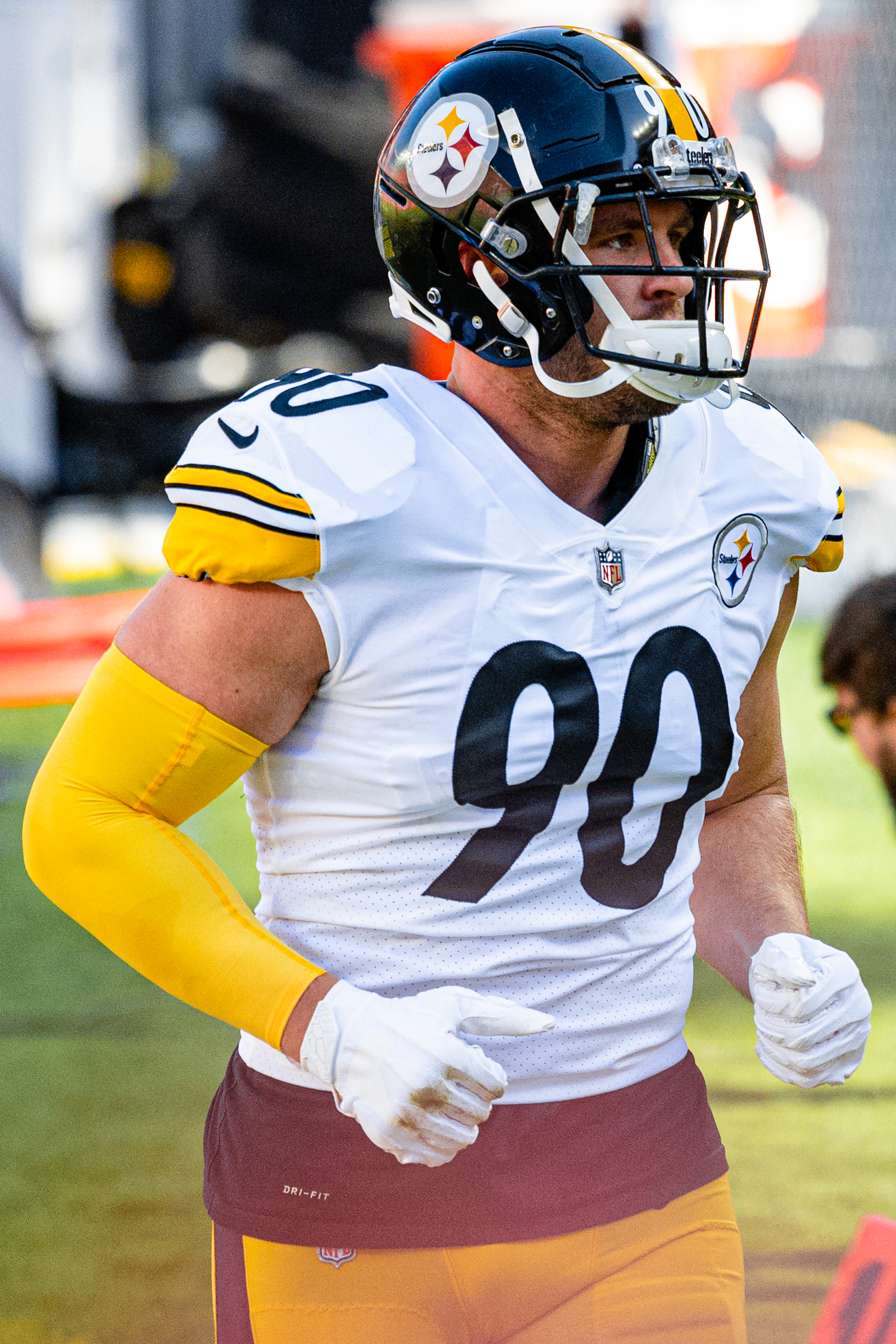
Watt at FirstEnergy Stadium in 2021

On September 9, 2021, Watt and the Steelers agreed to a four-year extension worth over $112 million with $80 million guaranteed, making him the highest paid defensive player in the NFL. In Week 1 against the Buffalo Bills, Watt had five quarterback hits and two sacks on quarterback Josh Allen, one of which Watt forced a fumble which was recovered by teammate Cameron Heyward in the 23–16 win. The following week, Watt recorded four tackles, one sack and one forced fumble against the Las Vegas Raiders before leaving the game with a groin injury. He was later ruled out for Week 3. In Week 6 against the Seahawks, Watt played a large role in the 23–20 win in overtime, tallying seven total tackles, three tackles for loss, three passes defended, and two sacks, one of which was a strip sack in overtime that led to the game-winning field goal. He was named the AFC Defensive Player of the Week for his performance in Week 6. In Week 13, Watt played a significant part in helping the Steelers defeat the Ravens, 20–19. He had six combined tackles (five solo), 3.5 sacks, three tackles for loss, six quarterback hits and a forced fumble. With 12 seconds remaining in the game and the Steelers ahead by one point, the Ravens attempted a 2-point conversion for the win. Watt was able to put pressure on Lamar Jackson and disrupt the pass, sealing the victory for his team. His performance earned him AFC Defensive Player of the Week. In the Steelers' 19–13 win over the Tennessee Titans in Week 15, Watt recorded 1.5 sacks on quarterback Ryan Tannehill. This gave Watt a total of 17.5 sacks on the season, a franchise record, surpassing the mark previously set by James Harrison in 2008. In Week 17, Watt earned his third AFC Defensive Player of the Week for the year, in a victory over the Browns, 26–14. In this game, Watt recorded five total tackles (all solo), four sacks, three tackles for loss, five quarterback hits and two passes defended.

On January 6, 2022, the Steelers named Watt their Team MVP. He became the only player in team history to win the award in three-straight seasons. In Week 18, Watt tied Michael Strahan's 20-year old NFL single-season sack record of 22.5 (later broken by Myles Garrett), with a sack of Baltimore's Tyler Huntley during their 16–13 overtime win. Despite missing two games and parts of four others, Watt ended the regular season leading the league in sacks, tackles for loss (21) and quarterback hits (39) for the second year in a row. He was named to the Pro Bowl and earned first-team All-Pro honors.

In the AFC Wild Card Round against the Kansas City Chiefs, Watt recovered a fumble forced by teammate Cameron Heyward and returned it 26 yards for a touchdown in the first half of the 42–21 loss. At the 11th Annual NFL Honors, Watt won NFL Defensive Player of the Year. He was ranked sixth by his fellow players on the NFL Top 100 Players of 2022.

=== 2022 ===
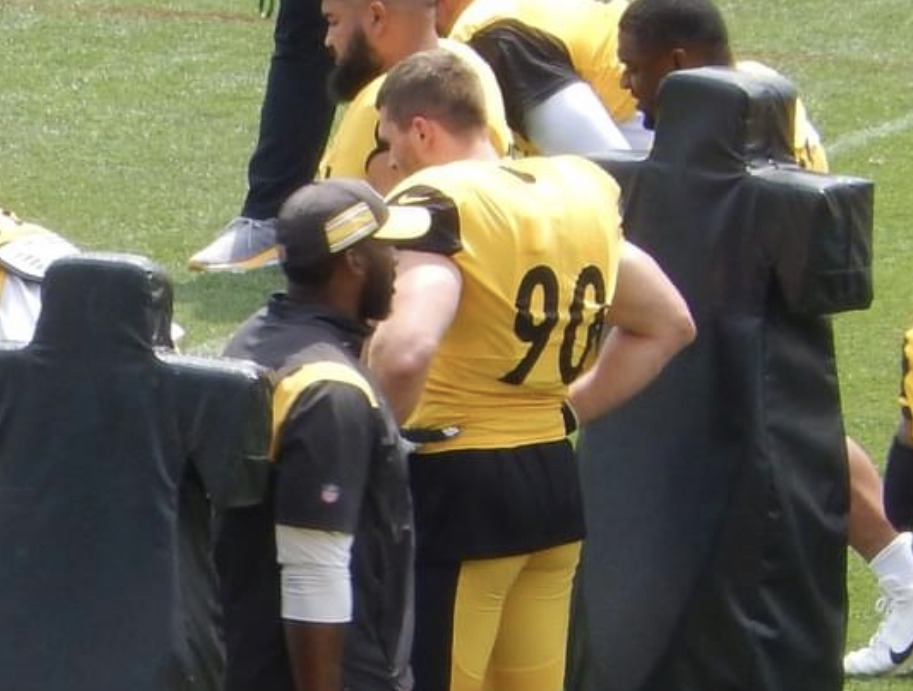
Watt during training camp in 2022

In Week 1 against the Bengals, Watt left the game in the fourth quarter with a torn pectoral muscle during the 23–20 overtime win, after attempting to sack quarterback Joe Burrow. He was placed on injured reserve.

On October 8, it was reported that Watt had recently undergone arthroscopic knee surgery for an injury sustained in the preseason. On October 26, the Steelers opened the 21-day practice window for Watt's return. He was activated from injured reserve on November 11, 2022.

He finished the 2022 season with 39 tackles, two interceptions, one forced fumble, and a career low 5.5 sacks in 10 games played. Despite this, Watt was voted to his fifth consecutive Pro Bowl. After the season, Watt was ranked 27th on the NFL Top 100 Players of 2023.

=== 2023 ===
In Week 1, a 30–7 loss to the 49ers, Watt would serve as one of the few bright spots for the Steelers as he sacked 49ers quarterback Brock Purdy three times, two of which resulted in forced fumbles. In addition, his three sacks brought his career total to 80.5, tying the Steelers franchise record set by James Harrison. In Week 2, Watt broke Harrison's franchise sack record by sacking Deshaun Watson and bringing his career total to 81.5. Watt later recovered a Watson fumble forced by teammate Alex Highsmith and returned it 17 yards for the game-winning touchdown in the 26–22 victory over the Browns. For his strong performance in the first three games of the season, Watt was named AFC Defensive Player of the Month for September. On January 2, 2024, the Steelers named Watt Team MVP for the fourth time. He is now tied with Antonio Brown in that category. In Week 18, Watt would record two sacks in the season finale versus the Ravens before leaving the game late in the third quarter with a Grade 2 MCL sprain. This brought his total to 19 sacks on the year, the second time he has reached that total, (only his brother J. J. Watt, DeMarcus Ware, and Mark Gastineau have reached that mark twice). He also became the first player to lead the NFL in sacks three times, since sacks became an official stat in 1982. For his performance in Week 18, Watt was named AFC Defensive Player of the Week after recording eight tackles (six solo), two sacks, and three tackles for loss. He finished the 2023 season with 68 tackles, 19 sacks, four forced fumbles, one interception, and one defensive touchdown. He was voted to his sixth Pro Bowl, and was named first-team All-Pro for a fourth time.

On January 15, 2024, Watt was inactive for the Steelers playoff game against the Bills due to a knee injury. The Steelers lost the game, 31–17, and were eliminated from the playoffs in the Wild Card Round. Following the season, Watt's fellow players voted him eighth on the NFL Top 100 Players of 2024.

=== 2024 ===
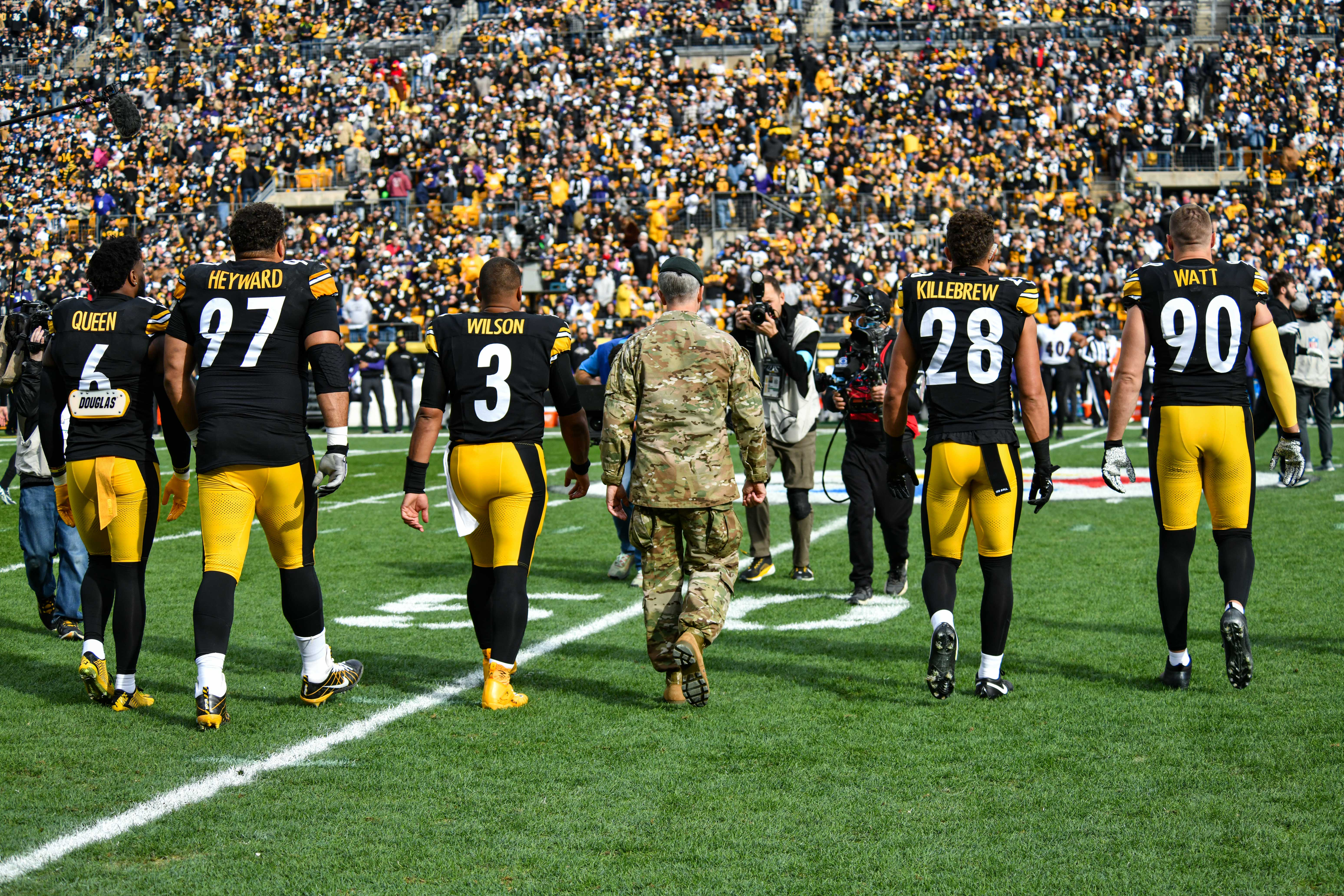
Watt (far right) with fellow Steelers' team captains before a game in 2024

After returning from his injury sustained in Week 18 of the 2023 season, Watt did not participate in any of the Steelers' three preseason games. He would finally play again in Week 1's matchup against the Atlanta Falcons. During the game, Watt had two strip sacks and a fumble recovery negated due to penalties. He was still able to record one sack and a fumble recovery. During Week 5's 20–17 loss to the Dallas Cowboys, Watt would record his 100th career sack. This made Watt the 44th player in NFL history to achieve 100 sacks since the statistic started being officially recorded in 1982. With 100 sacks in 109 career games with the Steelers, Watt is also the second fastest player to accomplish this statistic, only behind Reggie White. He became the third player in NFL history to reach 100 career sacks before the age of 30, once again succeeding White and Jared Allen. In Week 8, Watt recorded seven tackles, two sacks, a forced fumble and recovery in a 26–18 win over the Giants, earning AFC Defensive Player of the Week.

In Week 13's 44–38 victory over the Cincinnati Bengals, Watt strip sacked Joe Burrow leading to a fumble recovery by the Steelers to set up a field goal late in the second quarter to take the lead going into halftime.

During the Steelers' loss to the Philadelphia Eagles on December 15, Watt recorded two sacks and a forced fumble, then appeared to suffer a non-contact ankle injury, leaving the game during the fourth quarter. It was later revealed Watt simply rolled his ankle, avoiding any serious injury. He returned to play in the following week's 34–17 loss to the Baltimore Ravens in which he recorded four tackles. On January 1, 2025, Watt was named Steelers Team MVP for the fifth time, a franchise record. He was named to his seventh consecutive Pro Bowl on January 2, 2025. Watt finished the season leading the league with six forced fumbles. He was a finalist for the DPOY award, for a fifth time, and earned second-team All-Pro honors.

The Steelers finished 10–7, earning a playoff berth for a second consecutive season. In the Wild Card Round against the Ravens, the Steelers lost 28–14. Watt suffered an arm injury during the game which limited him for much of the second half. He finished the game without a statistic. Watt was ranked 11th on the NFL Top 100 Players of 2025.

=== 2025 ===
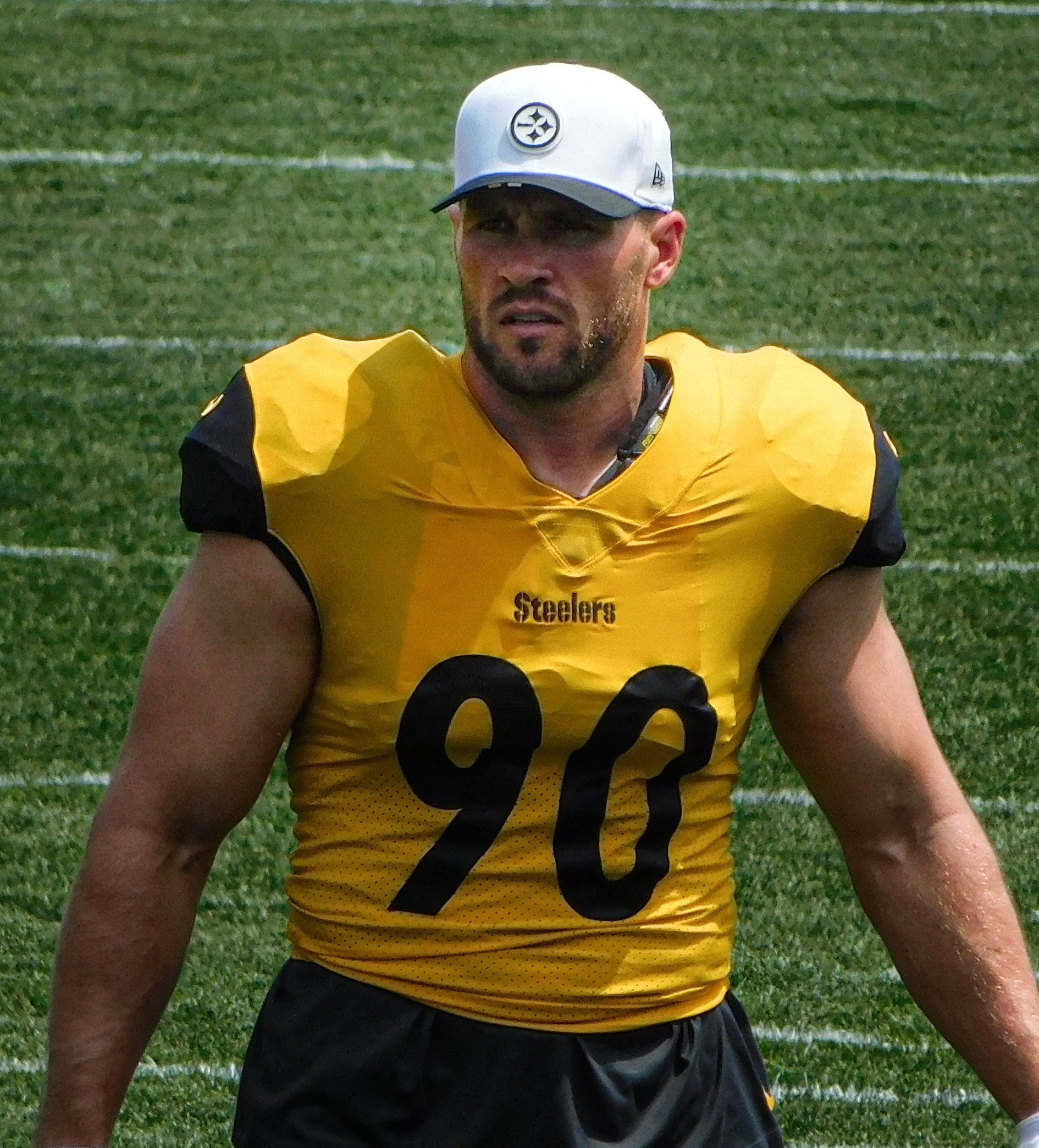
Watt during training camp in 2025

On July 22, 2025, Watt signed a three-year extension worth $123 million with $108 million guaranteed, making him the highest paid non-quarterback in the NFL at the time.

In Week 3 against the New England Patriots, Watt sacked quarterback Drake Maye twice. This ended Watt's five-game regular season sack drought, which dated back to last season. He also had a forced fumble and fumble recovery in the Steelers 21–14 win. During the Steelers' Week 4 victory over the Minnesota Vikings in Dublin, Watt made his eighth career interception when he picked off Carson Wentz. In the Steelers' Week 12 loss to the Chicago Bears, Watt had a strip sack on Caleb Williams in the end zone, which was recovered by teammate Nick Herbig for a touchdown. It was his 115th career sack, passing his brother J. J. on the NFL's all-time list.

On December 12, 2025, Watt was hospitalized after experiencing a partial lung collapse at the team's practice facility. This injury kept him out for the next three games. Watt returned in Week 18, and recorded his ninth career interception. The Steelers went on to defeat the Ravens, 26–24, winning the AFC North. Watt finished the season with 55 tackles, seven sacks, three forced fumbles and two interceptions. He was named to his eighth straight Pro Bowl.

On January 12, 2026, the Steelers lost to the Houston Texans in the Wild Card Round, 30–6. Watt finished the game with six combined tackles and a fumble recovery. Watt was ranked 41st on the NFL Top 100 Players of 2026.

=== 2026 ===
Watt with the Steelers in 2026

On September 13, 2026, during the fourth quarter of the Steelers' 20–13 victory over the Atlanta Falcons in Week 1, Watt made a "pick six" (interception directly returned for a touchdown). Joshua Kendall and Mike DeFabo of The Athletic said that this play "secured the win" and "made the difference". With the interception, Watt joined Julius Peppers as the only two players to record 100 sacks and 10 interceptions over an NFL career. Throughout the game, Watt also contributed three tackles for a loss and two sacks. For his performance in the season opener, Watt earned AFC Defensive Player of the Week. In Week 4's 27–24 loss to the Cleveland Browns, Watt recorded one sack and a forced fumble, which he also recovered. The forced fumble was the 37th of his career, tying Greg Lloyd for the Steelers all-time lead. In Week 8, Watt had two sacks in the 27–6 win against Cleveland. He now holds the career sack record against the Browns. It was the second time he accomplished this against an AFC North team, the first being the Ravens in 2024.

== Career statistics ==
Legend
	NFL Defensive Player of the Year
	NFL record
	Led the league
**Bold**	Career high

=== NFL ===
==== Regular season ====
Year	Team	Games		Tackles						Interceptions				Fumbles			
Year	Team	GP	GS	Cmb	Solo	Ast	Sck	TFL	QBH	Int	Yds	TD	PD	FF	FR	Yds	TD
2017	PIT	15	15	54	40	14	7.0	10	13	1	17	0	7	1	0	0	0
2018	PIT	16	16	**68**	**50**	18	13.0	12	21	0	0	0	3	6	0	0	0
2019	PIT	16	16	55	35	20	14.5	14	36	**2**	7	0	**8**	**8**	**4**	0	0
2020	PIT	15	15	53	43	10	15.0	**23**	**41**	1	0	0	7	2	0	0	0
2021	PIT	15	15	64	48	16	**22.5**	21	39	0	0	0	7	5	3	1	0
2022	PIT	10	10	39	27	12	5.5	8	12	**2**	0	0	5	1	0	0	0
2023	PIT	17	17	**68**	48	20	19.0	19	36	1	24	0	**8**	4	3	**34**	**1**
2024	PIT	17	17	61	40	21	11.5	19	27	0	0	0	4	6	2	0	0
2025	PIT	14	14	55	23	**32**	7.0	10	19	**2**	13	0	**8**	3	2	0	0
2026	PIT	10	10	23	16	7	7.5	11	12	1	**35**	**1**	4	1	1	0	0
Career		145	145	540	370	170	122.5	147	256	10	96	1	61	37	15	35	1

==== Postseason ====
Year	Team	Games		Tackles						Interceptions				Fumbles			
Year	Team	GP	GS	Cmb	Solo	Ast	Sck	TFL	QBH	Int	Yds	TD	PD	FF	FR	Yds	TD
2017	PIT	1	1	2	1	1	0.0	0	2	0	0	0	**1**	0	0	0	0
2020	PIT	1	1	3	2	1	0.0	1	0	0	0	0	**1**	0	0	0	0
2021	PIT	1	1	3	**3**	0	**1.0**	**2**	**3**	0	0	0	**1**	0	**1**	**26**	**1**
2023	PIT	0	0	Did not play due to injury													
2024	PIT	1	1	0	0	0	0.0	0	0	0	0	0	0	0	0	0	0
2025	PIT	1	1	**6**	**3**	**3**	0.0	0	1	0	0	0	0	0	**1**	0	0
Career		5	5	14	9	5	1.0	3	6	0	0	0	3	0	2	26	1

=== College ===
Season	Team	GP	Tackles				Interceptions					Fumbles	
Season	Team	GP	Cmb	Solo	Ast	Sck	Int	Yds	Avg	TD	PD	FF	FR
2013	Wisconsin	0	Redshirt										
2014	Wisconsin	0	Did not play due to injury										
2015	Wisconsin	13	8	4	4	0.0	0	0	0.0	0	3	0	0
2016	Wisconsin	14	**63**	**38**	**25**	**11.5**	**1**	**17**	**17.0**	**1**	**4**	**2**	**1**
Career		27	71	42	29	11.5	1	17	17.0	1	7	2	1

== Career highlights ==
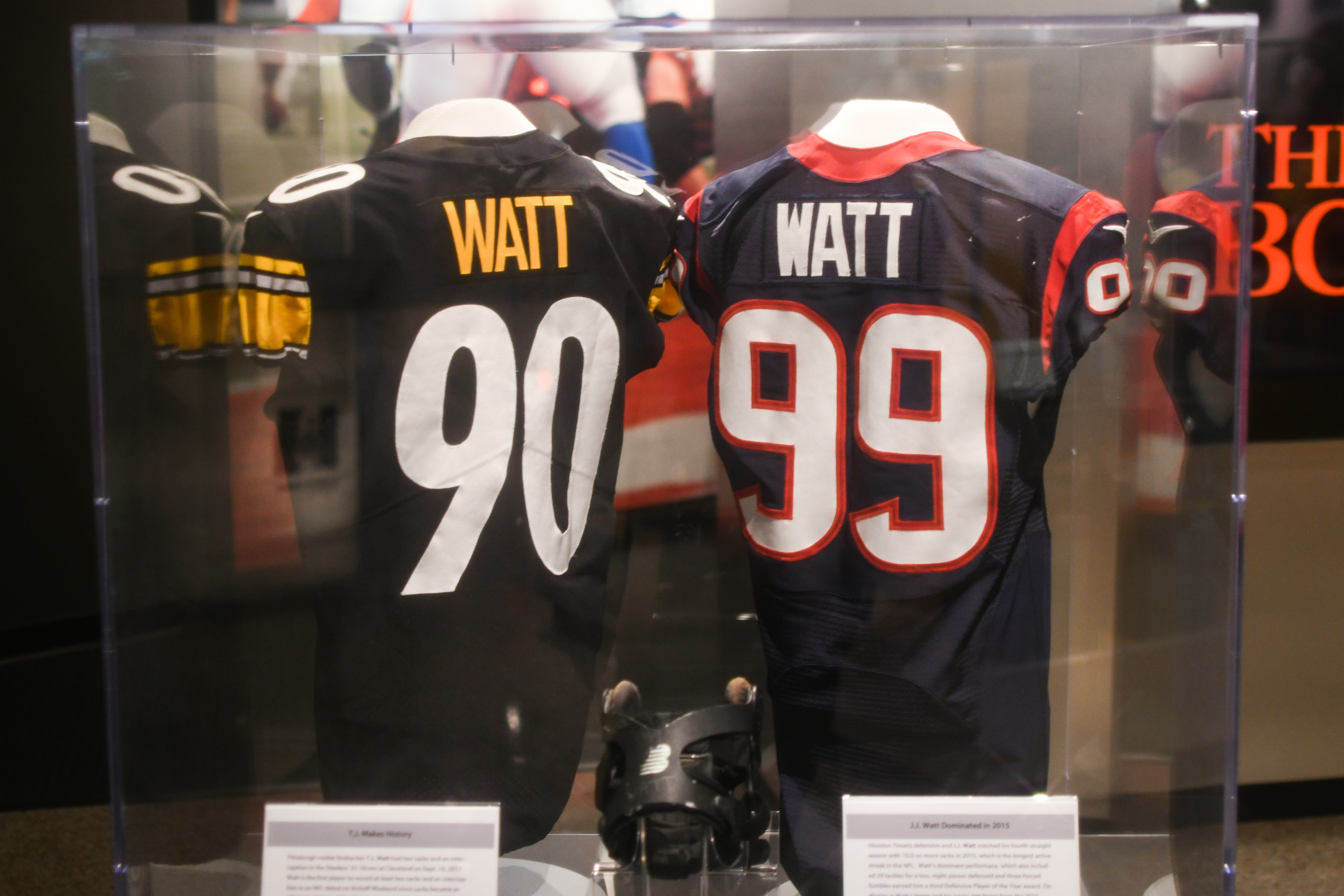
Watt's uniform worn with the Steelers (left) and his brother J. J.'s uniform worn with the Texans (right), both exhibited at the Pro Football Hall of Fame.

=== Awards and honors ===
NFL

- AP NFL Defensive Player of the Year (2021)
- PFWA NFL Defensive Player of the Year (2021)
- Sporting News Defensive Player of the Year (2021)
- 3× 101 Awards - AFC Defensive Player of the Year (2020, 2021, 2023)
- 4× First-team All-Pro (2019–2021, 2023)
- 2× Second-team All-Pro (2019 (Note: Selected as a linebacker), 2024)
- 8× Pro Bowl (2018–2025)
- 3× Deacon Jones Award (Note: Award given to the NFL annual sacks leader) (2020, 2021, 2023)
- 2× NFL forced fumbles leader (2019, 2024)
- Butkus Award (pro) (2020)
- PFWA All-Rookie Team (2017)
- 5× PFWA All-NFL Team (2019–2021, 2023, 2024)
- 100 sacks club
- PFF Award: Best Run Defender (2024)
- 8× NFL Top 100 — 93rd (2019), 25th (2020), 9th (2021), 6th (2022), 27th (2023), 8th (2024), 11th (2025), 41st (2026)
- 4× AFC Defensive Player of the Month
- 9× AFC Defensive Player of the Week

College

- Second-team AP All-American (2016)
- First-team All-Big Ten (2016)
- 2× Academic All-Big Ten (2015, 2016)
- Cotton Bowl Classic champion (2017)
- Holiday Bowl champion (2015)

=== Records ===
==== NFL records ====
- Seasons leading league in sacks: 3
- Consecutive seasons leading league in sacks: 2 (tied with Mark Gastineau and Reggie White)

==== Pittsburgh Steelers records ====
- Sacks, single season: 22.5
- Sacks, career: 122.5
- Seasons with 10+ sacks: 6
- Forced fumbles, single season: 8
- Forced fumbles, career: 37 (tied with Greg Lloyd)
- Quarterback hits, career: 256
- 5× Team MVP (2019–2021, 2023, 2024)

== Personal life ==
Watt has two older brothers, J. J. and Derek, who both played at the University of Wisconsin before going on to NFL careers. Derek is a former fullback who was selected in the sixth round by the San Diego Chargers with the 198th overall pick in the 2016 NFL draft. He was college teammates with T. J. from 2013 to 2015 and was also T. J.'s teammate with the Steelers from 2020 to 2022. Eldest brother J. J. is a former three-time NFL Defensive Player of the Year and five-time first-team All-Pro defensive end who was selected by the Houston Texans with the 11th overall pick in the 2011 NFL draft. In 2023, T. J. and J. J. became the first pair of brothers to appear on the cover of a Wheaties box together.

Watt married professional soccer player Dani Rhodes on July 9, 2022. Their daughter, Blakely Marie Watt, was born on March 10, 2025. On September 12, 2026, Watt's wife announced on Instagram that they were expecting their second child.

Watt supports 412 Food Rescue, a non-profit organization based in Pittsburgh. In 2025, both he and his wife became ambassadors for UPMC Children's Hospital Foundation, where they bring awareness to the future of pediatric healthcare.

In August 2025, Watt and his wife teamed up with Abercrombie & Fitch to release a new line of activewear, Your Personal Best (YPB).
