= Jim Katcavage =

American football player (1934–1995)

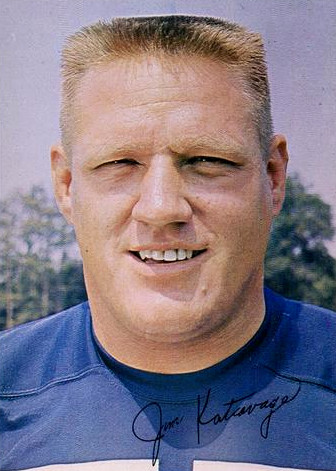
- Katcavage in 1965

No. 75
- Positions: Defensive tackle, defensive end

Personal information
- Born: October 28, 1934; Wilkes-Barre, Pennsylvania, U.S.
- Died: February 22, 1995 (aged 60); Maple Glen, Pennsylvania, U.S.
- Listed height: 6 ft 3 in (1.91 m)
- Listed weight: 237 lb (108 kg)

Career information
- High school: Roman Catholic (Philadelphia, Pennsylvania)
- College: Dayton (1952–1955)
- NFL draft: 1956: 4th round, 45th overall pick

Career history

Playing
- New York Giants (1956–1968)

Coaching
- New York Giants (1969–1973) Defensive line coach

Awards and highlights
- NFL champion (1956); 3× First-team All-Pro (1961–1963); 2× Second-team All-Pro (1959, 1966); 3× Pro Bowl (1961–1963); 2× NFL sacks leader (1962, 1963); 22nd greatest New York Giant of all-time; Second-team All-American (1955)

Career NFL statistics
- Fumble recoveries: 19
- Interceptions: 1
- Sacks: 91.5
- Stats at Pro Football Reference

James Richard Katcavage (October 28, 1934 – February 22, 1995) was an American professional football defensive tackle in the National Football League (NFL) who played thirteen seasons for the New York Giants.

== Biography ==
From 1952 until 1956, Katcavage played college football at the University of Dayton and was drafted in the fourth round of the 1956 NFL draft. Although quarterback sacks did not become an official NFL statistic until 1982, Katcavage is unofficially credited with a career total of 91 1/2 sacks, placing him fourth on the New York Giants' unofficial list.

After retiring from playing, Katcavage served as defensive line coach for the Giants from 1969 to 1973.

In 1966, Katcavage was inducted into the University of Dayton Hall of Fame.

In 2016, the Professional Football Researchers Association named Katcavage to the PFRA Hall of Very Good Class of 2016. As part of the 100th anniversary celebrations of the Giants, Katcavage was named the 22nd best player in Giants history.

== Death ==
Katcavage died on February 22, 1995, in Maple Glen, Pennsylvania. He was of Lithuanian descent.
