= DeMarcus Ware =

American football player (born 1982)

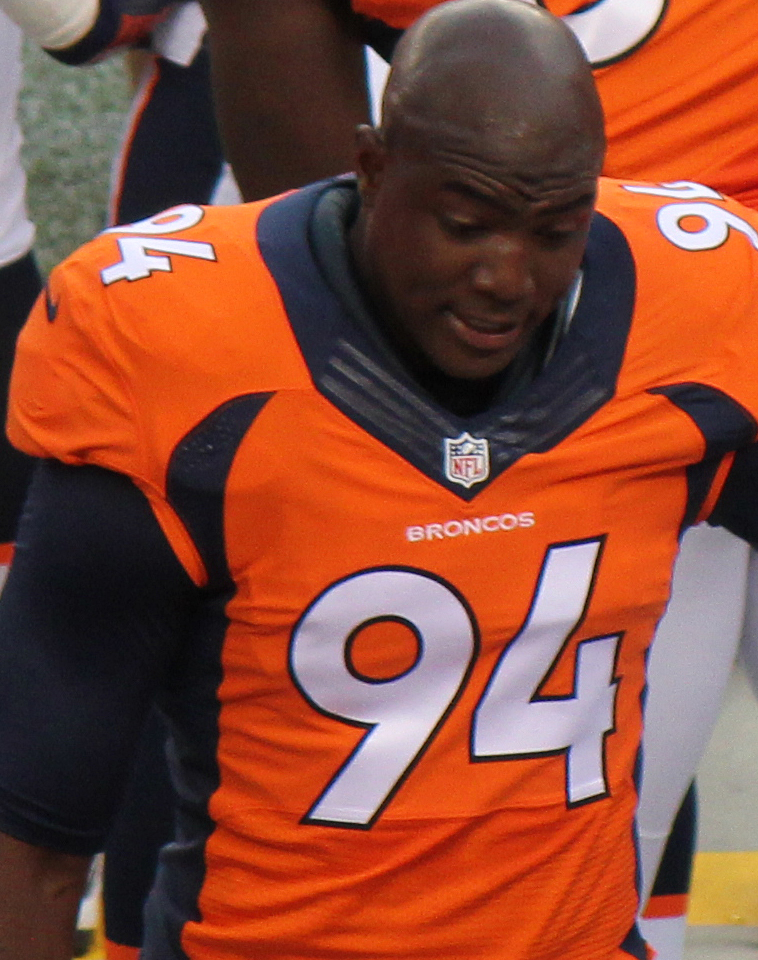
- Ware with the Denver Broncos in 2014

No. 94
- Position: Outside linebacker

Personal information
- Born: July 31, 1982 (age 44); Auburn, Alabama, U.S.
- Listed height: 6 ft 4 in (1.93 m)
- Listed weight: 258 lb (117 kg)

Career information
- High school: Auburn
- College: Troy State (2001–2004)
- NFL draft: 2005: 1st round, 11th overall pick

Career history

Playing
- Dallas Cowboys (2005–2013); Denver Broncos (2014–2016)

Coaching
- Denver Broncos (2018) Pass-rush consultant

Awards and highlights
- Super Bowl champion (50); 4× First-team All-Pro (2007–2009, 2011); 3× Second-team All-Pro (2006, 2010, 2012); 9× Pro Bowl (2006–2012, 2014, 2015); 2× NFL sacks leader (2008, 2010); NFL 2000s All-Decade Team; 2× Butkus Award (pro) (2008, 2011); Dallas Cowboys Ring of Honor; Sun Belt Defensive Player of the Year (2004); First-team All-Sun Belt (2004)

Career NFL statistics
- Total tackles: 657
- Sacks: 138.5
- Forced fumbles: 35
- Fumble recoveries: 8
- Interceptions: 3
- Defensive touchdowns: 3
- Stats at Pro Football Reference
- Pro Football Hall of Fame

DeMarcus Omar Ware (born July 31, 1982) is an American former professional football outside linebacker who played in the National Football League (NFL) for 12 seasons. He played college football for the Troy State Trojans as a defensive end, winning Sun Belt Defensive Player of the Year in 2004. Ware was selected in the first round of the 2005 NFL draft by the Dallas Cowboys.

During his nine seasons with the Cowboys, Ware led the league in sacks twice and received seven consecutive Pro Bowl and four first-team All-Pro selections. He also set the franchise record for sacks. Ware spent his final three seasons with the Denver Broncos, extending his Pro Bowl selections to nine and being a member of the team that won Super Bowl 50. He was inducted to the Pro Football Hall of Fame in 2023.

== Early life ==
Ware was born on July 31, 1982, in Auburn, Alabama. Ware played football, basketball, baseball, and ran track in high school; he attended Auburn High School (with defensive end Osi Umenyiora and linebacker Marcus Washington). In football, Ware played both linebacker and wide receiver, and as a senior, he won every game, and was named the team's Most Valuable Wide Receiver and Most Valuable Linebacker, and won Top Leadership honors. He finished his senior season with seven sacks and 55 total tackles (40 solo tackles, 15 assisted tackles).

In track & field, Ware was one of the state's top performers in the long jump (PB of 7.14 meters). He ran the 55 metres in 6.74 seconds and had a personal-best jump of 1.94 meters in the high jump.

== College career ==
Ware accepted a scholarship from Troy University, where he was a two-time All-Sun Belt Conference selection for the Troy Trojans football team.

Ware became a starter at defensive end as a sophomore, and was a part of a defensive line that included future NFL player and former high school teammate Osi Umenyiora. He posted 72 tackles (fifth on the team) and 19.5 tackles for loss. The next year, he registered 62 tackles, 16 tackles for a loss, six sacks, 32 quarterback hurries (led the team), five forced fumbles and two fumble recoveries.

As a senior, Ware was a dominant player, receiving the Sun Belt Defensive Player of the Year, and was a finalist for the Hendricks Award, which is given annually to the top defensive end in college football. In 2004, he helped lead his team to the school's first-ever bowl appearance, the Silicon Valley Football Classic. He posted 53 tackles, 10.5 sacks (led the Sun Belt Conference), 19 tackles for loss and four forced fumbles.

Ware finished his college career with 27.5 sacks, 201 tackles, 74 quarterback hurries, ten forced fumbles, four fumble recoveries, and one interception. His 27.5 sacks rank second in school history for sacks in a career, and his 55.5 tackles for losses rank first in school history.

Ware was named to the Sun Belt Conference All-Decade Team. In 2012, he was inducted into the Troy University Sports Hall of Fame. In 2014, he was inducted into the Senior Bowl Hall of Fame.

== Professional career ==
=== 2005 NFL draft ===
A defensive end at Troy, Ware was considered a "tweener DE/OLB prospect" by most scouts. He was supposed to be a perfect fit as a rush linebacker in a 3–4 defense prior to the 2005 NFL draft and was projected to go early in the second round by Sports Illustrated. Prospect Marcus Spears was considered by head coach Bill Parcells to be the key to the team's eventual move to a 3–4 defense and wanted to take him with the first selection (11th overall pick). Owner/general manager Jerry Jones overruled Parcells and selected Ware instead with the 11th overall pick in the first round. The Cowboys thought he would not be available later in the draft. Spears was selected by the Cowboys with the 20th overall pick.

Pre-draft measurables
Height	Weight	Arm length	Hand span	40-yard dash	10-yard split	20-yard split	20-yard shuttle	Three-cone drill	Vertical jump	Broad jump	Bench press	Wonderlic
6 ft 4 in (1.93 m)	251 lb (114 kg)	33 1/4 in (0.84 m)	10 in (0.25 m)	4.65 s	1.70 s	2.75 s	4.07 s	6.83 s	38.5 in (0.98 m)	10 ft 2 in (3.10 m)	27 reps	20
All values from NFL Combine.

Ware also was credited with a 430-pound bench press, a 570-pound squat, and a 360-pound power clean.

=== Dallas Cowboys ===
==== 2005 ====
In his NFL debut against the San Diego Chargers, Ware posted three tackles, one for a loss, and one quarterback pressure. The Cowboys won the game 28–24. In a game against San Francisco in Week 3, he recorded his first sack bringing down Tim Rattay. Ware earned the NFL Defensive Rookie of the Month award for October after recording 16 tackles, three sacks, and seven quarterback pressures to help Dallas start the season with a 3–2 record. In Week 16, Ware recorded three sacks and three forced fumbles in a match against the Carolina Panthers. For that performance, Ware was named NFC Defensive Player of the Week and the Diet Pepsi Rookie of the Week. He tied the Cowboys record for most sacks in a single game, held by Randy White. He finished with 58 total tackles, 14 tackles for losses and three forced fumbles. He tied Greg Ellis for a team-best eight sacks and joined Jimmie Jones as the only rookies to ever lead or tie for the Dallas Cowboys' team lead in sacks.

==== 2006 ====
In 2006, Ware ended the regular season with a team-high 11.5 sacks, the most ever by a Cowboys linebacker. This total broke Anthony Dickerson's record of 10.5 from 1983. He added 73 tackles, a fumble recovery, and an interception, both returned for a touchdown. Ware was named a starter on the NFC Pro Bowl team. In Week 6 against division rival Eagles, Ware had a memorable moment with his 69-yard fumble return for his first career NFL touchdown. He recorded his first career interception against Michael Vick in a game against the Atlanta Falcons and returned it for a 41-yard touchdown. Ware finished tied for ninth in the league in total sacks and Shawne Merriman led the league with 17 sacks.

==== 2007 ====
Ware broke out with his 2007 season, leading new Cowboys' head coach Wade Phillips to call him the best outside linebacker in the league. Ware became the second Cowboy ever to record at least 14 sacks in a season, since Jim Jeffcoat in 1986. Ware led the team with 27 quarterback pressures, eight tackles for losses, and four forced fumbles while finishing with 80 tackles. Ware made his second straight Pro Bowl along with 12 other teammates. He was selected to the All-Pro team for the second straight year along with teammates, Terrell Owens and Jason Witten. Ware finished tied for third in the league behind Patrick Kerney (14.5 sacks) and Jared Allen (15.5 sacks).

==== 2008 ====
In the 2008 matchup against the St. Louis Rams, Ware tied the NFL record of former Denver Broncos linebacker Simon Fletcher for recording a sack in ten straight games. He was named NFC Defensive Player of the Week for his Week 15 game against the New York Giants, where he had three sacks. Ware was selected to his third consecutive Pro Bowl after pacing the league, establishing an official club record and tying Derrick Thomas for sixth in league history with 20 sacks. Ware ended the 2008 season with 84 tackles, nine tackles for a loss, six forced fumbles, and two passes defended. Ware was named NFC Defensive Player of the Year by Kansas City Committee as well as NFL Alumni Pass Rusher of the Year. Ware finished the 2008 season as the league leader in sacks for the first time in his career. He finished second in AP Defensive Player of the Year voting. Ware became the first recipient of the professional Butkus Award.

==== 2009 ====
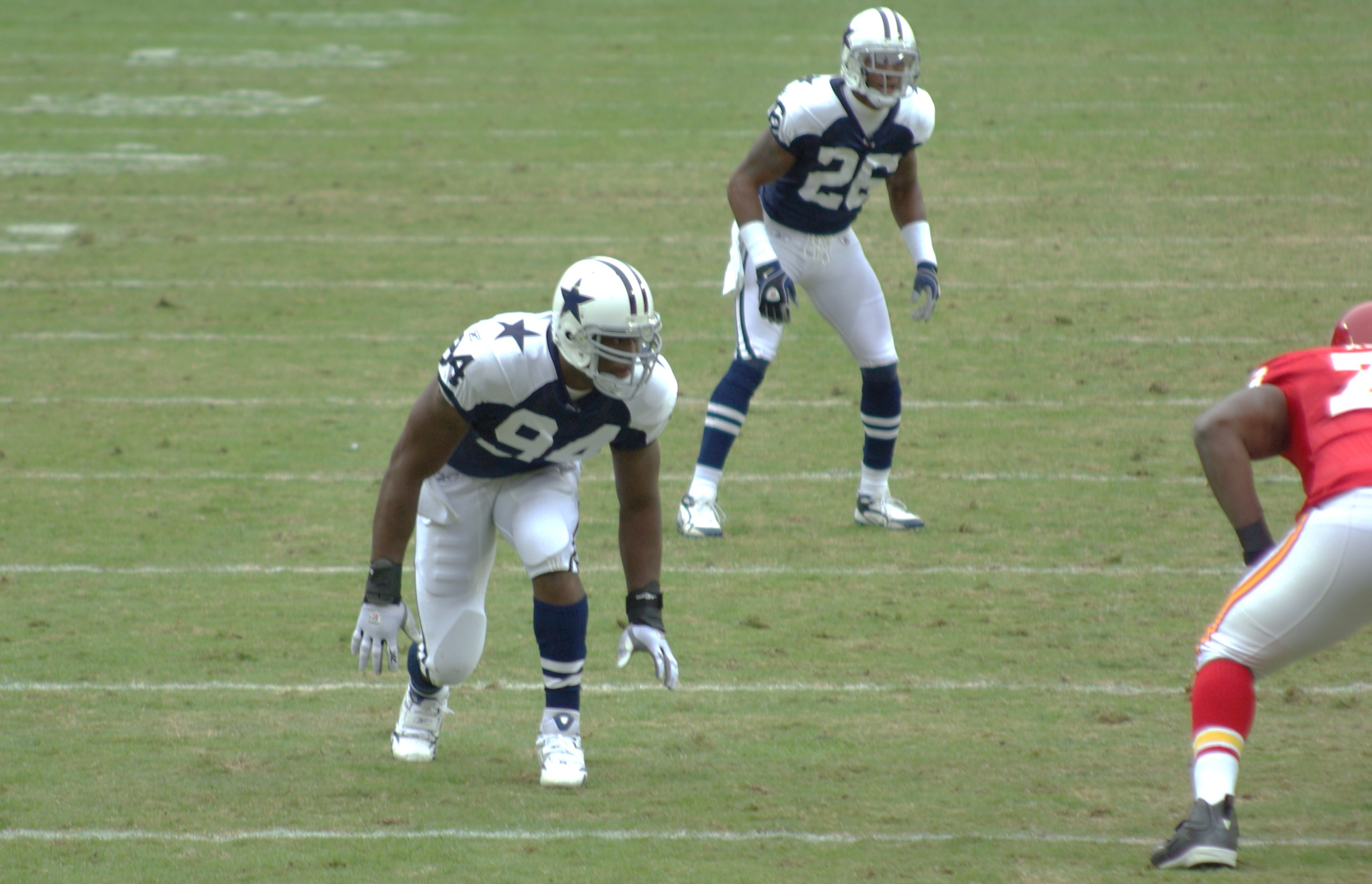
Ware with the Dallas Cowboys in 2009

In 2009, Ware was listed as the best 3-4 outside linebacker by Sporting News In October, Ware signed a six-year, $78 million contract, putting him among the top-five highest paid defenders in the NFL. Two months later, Ware suffered a neck injury and was taken off the field by a cart while playing against the San Diego Chargers. The injury was diagnosed later as a sprained neck. He was taken to the hospital for further tests, but was released the next day. He returned to play the next week, against the then-undefeated New Orleans Saints, and recorded two sack-fumbles, including the one that ended the Saints' chances at a comeback and an undefeated season. For this performance, he was named NFC Defensive Player of the Week. He made his fourth consecutive appearance in the Pro Bowl as a starter in 2009, after leading the Cowboys with 11.0 sacks, a career-high 45 pressures, and five forced fumbles. He was named to the First All-Pro team in recognition of his 2009 season.

==== 2010 ====
Ware earned NFC Defensive Player of the Week for his Week 3 game against the Houston Texans, where he had three sacks in the 27–13 victory. Ware recorded 15.5 sacks and led the NFL in that category for the second time in three seasons. He made a fifth straight Pro Bowl. By leading the NFL in sacks for the second time in his career, Ware tied the record for most seasons leading the league in sacks with two. He tied Mark Gastineau, 1983–84; Reggie White, 1987–88; Kevin Greene, 1994, 1996; Michael Strahan, 2001, 2003; and Jared Allen, 2007, 2011. He was ranked 12th by his fellow players on the NFL Top 100 Players of 2011.

==== 2011 ====
In 2011, Ware had 19.5 sacks, 47 tackles, two pass deflections, and two forced fumbles. On October 30, Ware recorded a career-high four sacks against the Philadelphia Eagles in a 34–7 loss. Ware finished second in the NFL in total sacks for the 2011 season behind Jared Allen who posted 22.0 sacks. Ware was selected to the 2012 Pro Bowl as a starter and voted to the All-Pro team again. He was ranked sixth by his fellow players on the NFL Top 100 Players of 2012.

==== 2012 ====
In the season opener against the defending Super Bowl champion New York Giants at MetLife Stadium, Ware recorded two sacks against Eli Manning to reach 101.5 sacks for his career. With these two sacks Ware became the second fastest player (113 games) to reach 100 sacks behind Reggie White (96 games). At the end of the 2012 season, Ware finished with 11.5 sacks, five forced fumbles and was selected to his seventh Pro Bowl and was named to the Second All-Pro team. Ware was unable to play in the Pro Bowl after his off-season shoulder surgery. He endured a difficult season having to deal with a hamstring he tore in training camp, a fractured right wrist and losing mobility on his right arm in the last three games, because of a hyperextended elbow and a torn labrum that forced him to use an elbow and shoulder harness. He was ranked 12th by his fellow players on the NFL Top 100 Players of 2013.

==== 2013 ====
Due to the Cowboys switch to the 4-3 from the 3–4, under new defensive coordinator Monte Kiffin, DeMarcus moved to defensive end, along with Anthony Spencer, who started his NFL career opposite Ware at left side linebacker, but was a defensive end at college. On the Cowboys's first play of the 2013 regular season, Ware recorded an interception off of Eli Manning in the 36–31 victory over the New York Giants. In Week 3 against the St. Louis Rams, he became the Cowboys' all-time sack leader, surpassing Harvey Martin's 30-year-old record of 114. He was ranked 56th by his fellow players on the NFL Top 100 Players of 2014.

After nine seasons with the Cowboys, Ware was released on March 11, 2014, making him a free agent for the first time in his career.

=== Denver Broncos ===
==== 2014 ====
On March 12, 2014, one day following his release from the Cowboys, Ware signed a three-year, $30 million contract with the Denver Broncos. The deal included $20 million in guaranteed money. Ware started at right outside linebacker for the team. He played 16 games, of which he started 15, finishing the season with 41 tackles, 10 sacks, one interception, one pass defensed, and two forced fumbles. He received Pro Bowl honors in his first season with the Broncos. He was ranked 87th by his fellow players on the NFL Top 100 Players of 2015.

==== 2015 ====
For the 2015 season, Ware was reunited with former head coach Wade Phillips as his defensive coordinator. The Broncos finished the season with the #1 defense and a 12–4 record. Ware posted 25 tackles and 7.5 sacks while playing in 11 of the regular season games, missing five games due to injury. In September, he earned AFC Defensive Player of the Month honors.

In the Divisional Round against the Pittsburgh Steelers, Ware had three tackles, recovered a crucial fumble near the end of the game, and recorded the game winning sack to help the Broncos win 23–16. Ware advanced to the Conference Championship for the first time in his career. In the AFC Championship game against the New England Patriots, Ware and the defense hit quarterback Tom Brady 27 times and placed pressure on him the entire game. The Broncos held on to win the game by a score of 20–18. On February 7, 2016, Ware was part of the Broncos team that won Super Bowl 50. In the game, the Broncos defeated the Carolina Panthers by a score of 24–10. Ware recorded five tackles and two sacks in the Super Bowl. He was ranked 36th by his fellow players on the NFL Top 100 Players of 2016.

==== 2016 ====
In a Week 1 Super Bowl 50 rematch against the Carolina Panthers, Ware recorded 1.5 sacks and helped the Broncos beat the Panthers by a score of 21–20. In Week 2 against the Colts, Ware left the game with an apparent arm injury as he was trying to bring down quarterback Andrew Luck. It was eventually revealed that there was an ulna fracture near the elbow. The injury required surgery with 4–5 weeks to recover. Ware went on to play 10 games recording four sacks before having season-ending back surgery on December 28, 2016.

==== Retirement ====
On March 13, 2017, Ware announced his retirement from the NFL after 12 seasons and 138.5 sacks, through his Twitter account.

On April 24, 2017, about a month after announcing his retirement from the NFL, Ware signed a one-day contract to retire as a member of the Dallas Cowboys, the team that drafted him.

=== Awards, recognitions and other statistics ===
Ware was tied for the record of most seasons leading the league in sacks with two (2008 and 2010). Ware is tied with Mark Gastineau, 1983–84; Reggie White, 1987–88; Kevin Greene, 1994, 1996; Michael Strahan, 2001, 2003; Jared Allen, 2007, 2011; and J. J. Watt, 2012, 2015. However, the record was surpassed by T. J. Watt, 2020, 2021, 2023.

As of the end of the 2012 season, Ware recorded 10+ sacks in seven straight seasons. Only two other players in NFL history have more consecutive seasons with 10+ sacks: Reggie White (9), John Randle (8)

Pete Prisco, CBS Sports Senior NFL Columnist, ranked Ware as the 3rd best player in the NFL (behind Aaron Rodgers and Tom Brady) going into the 2012 season and as the best defensive player in the NFL. In 2012, NFL.com analyst Daniel Jeremiah ranked Ware as the best edge pass rusher in the league and a "top-five player in the NFL, regardless of position". The NFL Top 100 for 2012 ranked Ware as the best rusher, best linebacker, 2nd overall defensive player behind defensive back Darrelle Revis (number 5 overall) and the 6th overall player in the NFL.

Ware is the second fastest player ever to reach 100 sacks.

Ware recorded 28 multiple-sack games and 32 forced fumbles as a member of the Dallas Cowboys, both most in club history.

Ware has ranked in the top three in total sacks league-wide in 4 out of 5 seasons (3rd place in 2007, 1st place in 2008, 7th place in 2009, 1st place in 2010, and 2nd place in 2011).

On April 19, 2016, the governor of Alabama declared April 19 "DeMarcus Ware Day" in his honor.

=== Pro Football Hall of Fame ===
On February 9, 2023, the Pro Football Hall of Fame announced that Ware would be inducted in its 2023 class.

== NFL career statistics ==
Legend
	Won the Super Bowl
	Led the league
**Bold**	Career high

=== Regular season ===
Year	Team	Games		Tackles					Interceptions					Fumbles			
Year	Team	GP	GS	Cmb	Solo	Ast	Sck	Sfty	Int	Yds	Lng	TD	PD	FF	FR	Yds	TD
2005	DAL	16	16	58	47	11	8.0	0	0	0	0	0	1	3	0	0	0
2006	DAL	16	16	71	57	14	11.5	0	**1**	**41**	**41**	**1**	5	5	1	**69**	**1**
2007	DAL	16	16	**84**	60	**24**	14.0	0	0	0	0	0	4	4	0	0	0
2008	DAL	16	16	**84**	**69**	15	**20.0**	0	0	0	0	0	2	**6**	1	0	0
2009	DAL	16	15	57	45	12	11.0	0	0	0	0	0	**6**	5	0	0	0
2010	DAL	16	16	66	56	10	15.5	0	0	0	0	0	1	2	**2**	22	**1**
2011	DAL	16	16	58	47	11	19.5	0	0	0	0	0	2	2	1	0	0
2012	DAL	16	16	56	33	23	11.5	0	0	0	0	0	0	5	1	0	0
2013	DAL	13	13	40	28	12	6.0	0	**1**	0	0	0	2	0	1	0	0
2014	DEN	16	15	40	33	7	10.0	0	**1**	3	3	0	1	2	0	0	0
2015	DEN	11	10	25	17	8	7.5	0	0	0	0	0	0	1	1	0	0
2016	DEN	10	8	15	9	6	4.0	0	0	0	0	0	1	0	0	0	0
Career		178	173	654	501	153	138.5	0	3	44	41	1	25	35	8	91	2

=== Cowboys franchise records ===
- All-time leader in sacks: 117
- All-time leader in forced fumbles: 32
- All-time leader in tackles for loss: 145
- All-time leader in quarterback hits: 185

== Television appearance ==
On September 12, 2018, Ware was announced as one of the celebrities who would compete on season 27 of Dancing with the Stars. His professional partner was Lindsay Arnold. Ware and Arnold were eliminated on the seventh week of competition, finishing in joint-seventh place alongside John Schneider and his professional partner Emma Slater.

In 2024, Ware competed in season eleven of The Masked Singer as the wild card contestant "Koala". He was eliminated on "Transformers Night" alongside Colton Underwood as "Lovebird".

== Personal life ==
Ware is a Christian. He has said, “Jesus Christ has always been the center of who I am. If you’re not a part of something, how do you know your purpose? God is my purpose and I place all my hope and trust in who He is.”

In March 2005, Ware married his high school sweetheart, Taniqua Smith, a former Air Force member and the daughter of a police officer. After three difficult pregnancies, including the birth and death of a son, Omar, in 2006, they adopted their daughter, Marley. In 2010, they had a son, DeMarcus Ware II. Ware and Smith divorced in 2012. In 2021, he married Angela Ware. They had a son named Michael John Ware in 2021.
