= List of NFL career sacks leaders =

This is a list of National Football League (NFL) players who have reached the 100-sack milestone.

The NFL began to keep track of sacks in 1982, with 46 players having reached the milestone in that time. Using unofficial record-keeping (dating back to 1960), an additional 21 players have finished with 100 or more career sacks, leading to a total of 67 players.

Although other major NFL records get broken every season, the league's career sack record remains difficult to challenge. In September 2025, NFL reporter for USA Today Jacob Camenker wrote that approaching Bruce Smith's 200 sacks would require "something special" and that the record "seems highly unlikely" to be broken.

== List of NFL players with 100 official career sacks ==
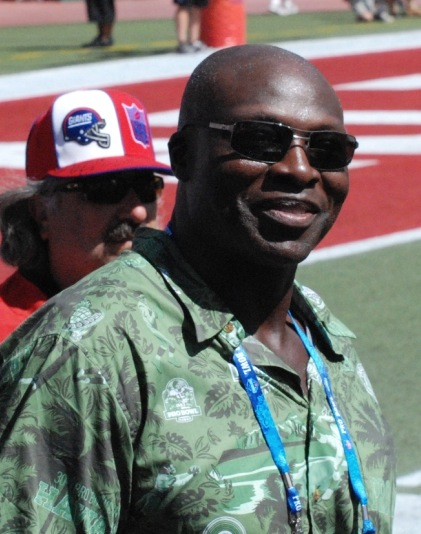
Bruce Smith has the most sacks in NFL history.

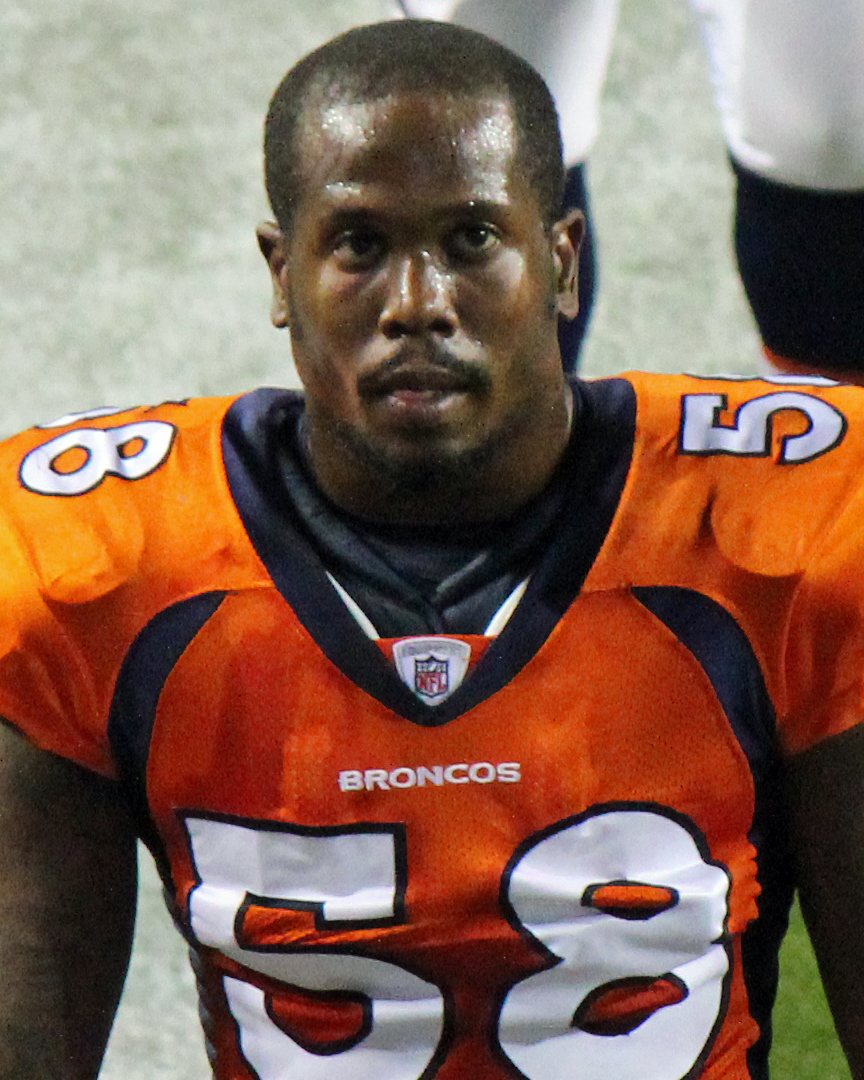
Von Miller is the current leader in career sacks among active players.

Key
Symbol	Meaning
Sacks	The total number of sacks the player recorded
†	Pro Football Hall of Fame member
^	The player is an active player

Updated through Week 10 of the 2026 NFL season.

National Football League players with over 100 official sacks
Rank	Pos.	Player	Seasons by team	Sacks	Refs
1	DE	Bruce Smith†	Buffalo Bills (1985–1999); Washington Redskins (2000–2003)	200.0	
2	DE	Reggie White†	Philadelphia Eagles (1985–1992); Green Bay Packers (1993–1998); Carolina Panthers (2000)	198.0	
3	OLB/DE	Kevin Greene†	Los Angeles Rams (1985–1992); Pittsburgh Steelers (1993–1995); Carolina Panthers (1996, 1998–1999); San Francisco 49ers (1997)	160.0	
4	OLB/DE	Julius Peppers†	Carolina Panthers (2002–2009, 2017–2018); Chicago Bears (2010–2013); Green Bay Packers (2014–2016)	159.5	
5	DE	Chris Doleman†	Minnesota Vikings (1985–1993, 1999); Atlanta Falcons (1994–1995); San Francisco 49ers (1996–1998)	150.5	
6	DE	Michael Strahan†	New York Giants (1993–2007)	141.5	
7	OLB/DE	Von Miller^	Denver Broncos (2011–2021); Los Angeles Rams (2021); Buffalo Bills (2022–2024); Washington Commanders (2025); Dallas Cowboys (2026–present)	139.5	
7	OLB/DE	Jason Taylor†	Miami Dolphins (1997–2007, 2009, 2011); Washington Redskins (2008); New York Jets (2010)	139.5	
9	OLB/DE	Terrell Suggs	Baltimore Ravens (2003–2018); Arizona Cardinals (2019); Kansas City Chiefs (2019)	139.0	
10	OLB/DE	DeMarcus Ware†	Dallas Cowboys (2005–2013); Denver Broncos (2014–2016)	138.5	
11	DE	Richard Dent†	Chicago Bears (1983–1993, 1995); San Francisco 49ers (1994); Indianapolis Colts (1996); Philadelphia Eagles (1997)	137.5	
11	DT	John Randle†	Minnesota Vikings (1990–2000); Seattle Seahawks (2001–2003)	137.5	
13	DE	Jared Allen†	Kansas City Chiefs (2004–2007); Minnesota Vikings (2008–2013); Chicago Bears (2014–2015); Carolina Panthers (2015)	136.0	
14	OLB/DE	John Abraham	New York Jets (2000–2005); Atlanta Falcons (2006–2012); Arizona Cardinals (2013–2014)	133.5	
15	DE	Leslie O'Neal	San Diego Chargers (1986–1995); St. Louis Rams (1996–1997); Kansas City Chiefs (1998–1999)	132.5	
15	OLB	Lawrence Taylor†	New York Giants (1981–1993)	132.5	
17	DE	Cameron Jordan^	New Orleans Saints (2011–present)	132.0	
18	DE	Myles Garrett^	Cleveland Browns (2017–2025); Los Angeles Rams (2026–present)	128.5	
19	OLB/DE	Rickey Jackson†	New Orleans Saints (1981–1993); San Francisco 49ers (1994–1995)	128.0	
20	OLB	Derrick Thomas†	Kansas City Chiefs (1989–1999)	126.5	
21	OLB/DE	Dwight Freeney†	Indianapolis Colts (2002–2012); San Diego Chargers (2013–2014); Arizona Cardinals (2015); Atlanta Falcons (2016); Seattle Seahawks (2017); Detroit Lions (2017)	125.5	
22	OLB/DE	Robert Mathis	Indianapolis Colts (2003–2016)	123.0	
23	OLB	T. J. Watt^	Pittsburgh Steelers (2017–present)	122.5	
24	DE	Simeon Rice	Arizona Cardinals (1996–2000); Tampa Bay Buccaneers (2001–2006); Denver Broncos (2007); Indianapolis Colts (2007)	122.0	
25	DE	Clyde Simmons	Philadelphia Eagles (1986–1993); Arizona Cardinals (1994–1995); Jacksonville Jaguars (1996–1997); Cincinnati Bengals (1998); Chicago Bears (1999–2000)	121.5	
26	OLB/DE	Danielle Hunter^	Minnesota Vikings (2015–2023); Houston Texans (2024–present)	118.5	
27	DE	Calais Campbell^	Arizona Cardinals (2008–2016, 2025); Jacksonville Jaguars (2017–2019); Baltimore Ravens (2020–2022, 2026–present); Atlanta Falcons (2023); Miami Dolphins (2024)	118.0	
28	OLB/DE	Khalil Mack^	Oakland Raiders (2014–2017); Chicago Bears (2018–2021); Los Angeles Chargers (2022–present)	116.0	
29	DE	J. J. Watt	Houston Texans (2011–2020); Arizona Cardinals (2021–2022)	114.5	
30	DE	Sean Jones	Los Angeles Raiders (1984–1987); Houston Oilers (1988–1993); Green Bay Packers (1994–1996)	113.0	
31	DT	Aaron Donald^	St. Louis / Los Angeles Rams (2014–2023, 2026–present)	112.5	
32	OLB	Justin Houston	Kansas City Chiefs (2011–2018); Indianapolis Colts (2019–2020); Baltimore Ravens (2021–2022); Carolina Panthers (2023); Miami Dolphins (2023)	112.0	
32	OLB/DE	Chandler Jones	New England Patriots (2012–2015); Arizona Cardinals (2016–2021); Las Vegas Raiders (2022)	112.0	
34	DE	Greg Townsend	Los Angeles / Oakland Raiders (1983–1993, 1997); Philadelphia Eagles (1994)	109.5	
35	OLB/DE	Pat Swilling	New Orleans Saints (1986–1992); Detroit Lions (1993–1994); Oakland Raiders (1995–1998)	107.5	
36	DE	Trace Armstrong	Chicago Bears (1989–1994); Miami Dolphins (1995–2000); Oakland Raiders (2001–2003)	106.0	
37	OLB/DE	Elvis Dumervil	Denver Broncos (2006–2012); Baltimore Ravens (2013–2016); San Francisco 49ers (2017)	105.5	
38	DE	Kevin Carter	St. Louis Rams (1995–2000); Tennessee Titans (2001–2004); Miami Dolphins (2005–2006); Tampa Bay Buccaneers (2007–2008)	104.5	
38	DE	Neil Smith	Kansas City Chiefs (1988–1996); Denver Broncos (1997–1999); San Diego Chargers (2000)	104.5	
40	DE	Jim Jeffcoat	Dallas Cowboys (1983–1994); Buffalo Bills (1995–1997)	102.5	
41	OLB/DE	Robert Quinn	St. Louis / Los Angeles Rams (2011–2017); Miami Dolphins (2018); Dallas Cowboys (2019); Chicago Bears (2020–2022); Philadelphia Eagles (2022)	102.0	
42	DE	William Fuller	Houston Oilers (1986–1993); Philadelphia Eagles (1994–1996); San Diego Chargers (1997–1998)	100.5	
42	OLB/DE	Charles Haley†	San Francisco 49ers (1986–1991, 1998–1999); Dallas Cowboys (1992–1996)	100.5	
42	OLB/DE	Cameron Wake	Miami Dolphins (2009–2018); Tennessee Titans (2019)	100.5	
45	DE	Carlos Dunlap	Cincinnati Bengals (2010–2020); Seattle Seahawks (2020–2021); Kansas City Chiefs (2022)	100.0	
45	OLB	Andre Tippett†	New England Patriots (1982–1993)	100.0	

== Unofficial sacks ==
In 2000, John Turney and Nick Webster, members of the Pro Football Researchers Association, conducted extensive research to create a more complete record of sacks in the NFL. After examining the play-by-play records of every NFL team as well as game film at NFL films they compiled a list of players with 100 sacks beginning in 1960. By including the unofficial sack/dump records from 1960 to 1981, the following players also qualify as members of the 100-Sack Club.

Additionally, linebackers (LB) Lawrence Taylor and Rickey Jackson played their rookie seasons in 1981, which was the last season that sacks were not officially tracked. Taylor had 9.5 and Jackson had 8.0 sacks that season, which would increase their totals to 142.0 and 136.0 sacks, respectively. These sacks would place Taylor at 9th and Jackson tied at 16th (with Jared Allen) on the unofficial sack list.

Unofficial and Official Ranks are based on the top 250 from Pro Football Reference.

Key
Symbol	Meaning
Sacks	The total number of sacks the player recorded
†	Pro Football Hall of Fame member

Updated through Week 8 of the 2026 NFL season.

Unofficial rank	Official rank	Pos.	Player	Seasons by team	Unofficial sack total	Official sack total	Refs
3	—	DE	Deacon Jones†	Los Angeles Rams (1961–1971); San Diego Chargers (1972–1973); Washington Redskins (1974)	173.5	—	
6	—	DE	Jack Youngblood†	Los Angeles Rams (1971–1984)	151.5	24.0	
8	—	DT	Alan Page†	Minnesota Vikings (1967–1978); Chicago Bears (1978–1981)	148.5	—	
T19	—	DE	Carl Eller†	Minnesota Vikings (1964–1978); Seattle Seahawks (1979)	133.5	—	
23	T130	DE	Al Baker	Detroit Lions (1978–1982); St. Louis Cardinals (1983–1986); Cleveland Browns (1987, 1989–1990); Minnesota Vikings (1988)	131.0	65.5	
24	—	DE/DT	Coy Bacon	Los Angeles Rams (1968–1972); San Diego Chargers (1973–1975); Cincinnati Bengals (1976–1977); Washington Redskins (1978–1981)	130.5	—	
25	—	DE	Claude Humphrey†	Atlanta Falcons (1968–1978); Philadelphia Eagles (1979–1981)	130.0	—	
26	—	DE	Jim Marshall	Cleveland Browns (1960); Minnesota Vikings (1961–1979)	129.5	—	
T31	—	DE	Cedrick Hardman	San Francisco 49ers (1970–1979); Oakland Raiders (1980–1981)	122.5	—	
38	T48	DE	Jacob Green	Seattle Seahawks (1980–1992); San Francisco 49ers (1992)	115.5	97.5	
40	—	DE	Harvey Martin	Dallas Cowboys (1973–1983)	114.0	10.0	
T42	—	DE	Lyle Alzado	Denver Broncos (1971–1978); Cleveland Browns (1979–1981); Los Angeles Raiders (1982–1985)	112.0	23.0	
T45	T209	DT	Randy White†	Dallas Cowboys (1975–1988)	111.0	52.0	
T48	T97	DE	Mark Gastineau	New York Jets (1979–1988)	107.5	74.0	
T50	—	DE	Jack Gregory	Cleveland Browns (1967–1971, 1979); New York Giants (1972–1978)	106.0	—	
T50	T178	DE	Too Tall Jones	Dallas Cowboys (1974–1978, 1980–1989)	106.0	57.5	
54	—	DE	Elvin Bethea†	Houston Oilers (1968–1983)	105.0	1.0	
57	T48	DE	Dexter Manley	Washington Redskins (1981–1989); Phoenix Cardinals (1990); Tampa Bay Buccaneers (1991)	103.5	97.5	
T58	—	DE	Fred Dryer	New York Giants (1969–1971); Los Angeles Rams (1972–1981)	103.0	—	
T58	—	DE	Tony McGee	Chicago Bears (1971–1973); New England Patriots (1974–1981); Washington Redskins (1982–1984)	103.0	21.0	
T65	—	DT	Alex Karras†	Detroit Lions (1958–1962, 1964–1970)	100.0	—	

== See also ==
- List of NFL annual sacks leaders
