= List of NFL annual sacks leaders =

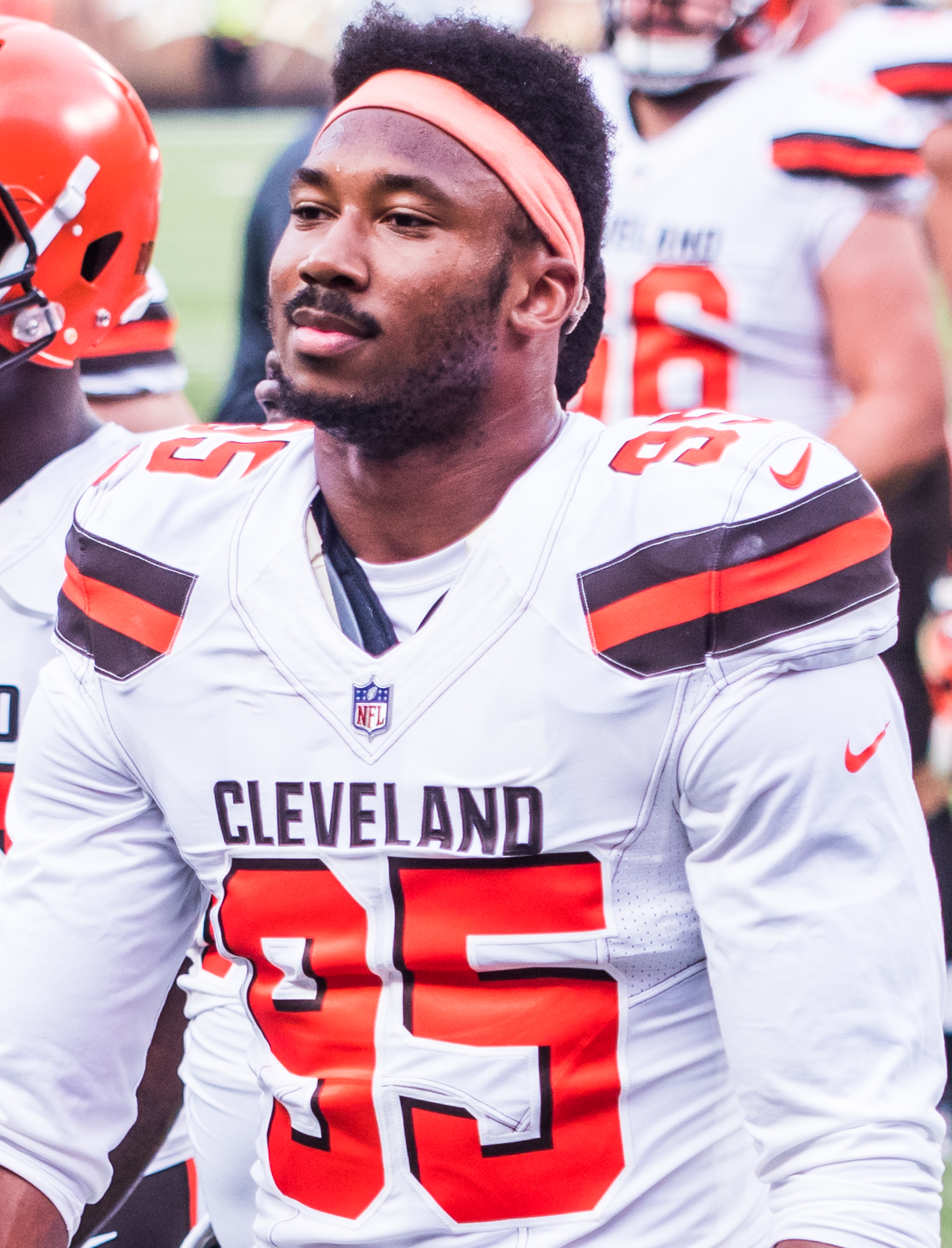
Myles Garrett holds the official single-season record for sacks with 23.

This is a list of National Football League (NFL) players who have led the regular season in sacks each year. Sacks became an official statistic in 1982 and sacks from years prior do not count towards a player's career total. Myles Garrett of the Los Angeles Rams holds the official record with 23, set during the 2025 season.

The Deacon Jones Award was established by the NFL in 2013 to recognize the annual leader in sacks, named after the former defensive end Deacon Jones who led the league in sacks five times. Since 1982, there have only been two players who have led the league in sacks with two different teams, Jared Allen (2007 with the Chiefs and 2011 with the Vikings) and Kevin Greene (1994 with the Steelers and 1996 with the Panthers). The Chiefs and the Vikings have had the most players lead the NFL in sacks with four. Seven players have been the league leader in sacks twice, while T. J. Watt has led the league three times.

== NFL annual sacks leaders ==
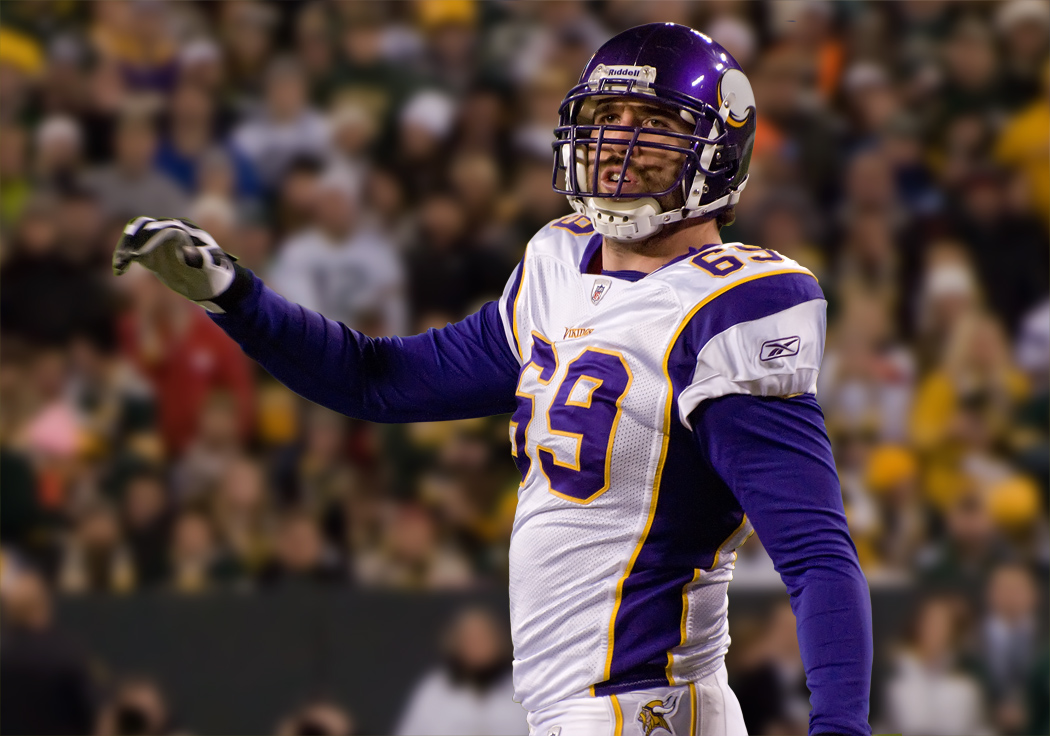
Jared Allen led the league in sacks in 2007 and 2011.

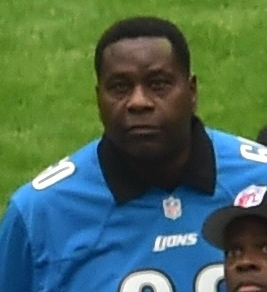
Al Baker is the unofficial NFL record holder with 23 sacks during the 1978 NFL season.

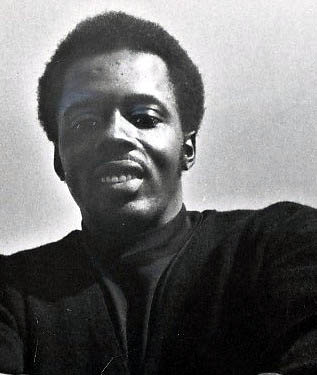
The Deacon Jones Award, given annually to the player who leads the league in sacks, is named after Deacon Jones. Jones unofficially led the league in sacks five times.

Key
Symbol	Meaning
Leader	The player who recorded the most sacks
Sacks	Total number of sacks
GP	Number of games played during the season
†	Pro Football Hall of Fame member
^	Active player
*	Single-season record
(#)	Denotes the number of times a player appears in this list

Note that the sack totals from 1960 to 1981 are considered unofficial by the NFL.

NFL annual sacks leaders by season
Season	Leader	Sacks	GP	Team	Refs
1960	Gino Marchetti†	11*	12	Baltimore Colts	
1961	Gene Lipscomb	17.5*	14	Pittsburgh Steelers	
1962	Jim Katcavage	16	14	New York Giants	
1963	Jim Katcavage (2)	20.5*	14	New York Giants	
1964	Deacon Jones†	22*	14	Los Angeles Rams	
1965	Deacon Jones† (2)	19	14	Los Angeles Rams	
1966	George Andrie	18.5	14	Dallas Cowboys	
1967	Deacon Jones† (3)	21.5	14	Los Angeles Rams	
1968	Deacon Jones† (4)	22	14	Los Angeles Rams	
1969	Carl Eller†	15	14	Minnesota Vikings	
1969	Deacon Jones† (5)	15	14	Los Angeles Rams	
1970	Tony Cline	17.5	14	Oakland Raiders	
1971	Cedrick Hardman	18	14	San Francisco 49ers	
1972	Jack Gregory	18.5	14	New York Giants	
1973	Bill Stanfill	18.5	14	Miami Dolphins	
1974	Fred Dryer	15	14	Los Angeles Rams	
1974	Jack Youngblood†	15	14	Los Angeles Rams	
1975	John Dutton	18	14	Baltimore Colts	
1976	Coy Bacon	21.5	14	Cincinnati Bengals	
1977	Harvey Martin	20	14	Dallas Cowboys	
1978	Al Baker	23*	16	Detroit Lions	
1979	Jack Youngblood† (2)	20.5	16	Los Angeles Rams	
1980	Al Baker (2)	17.5	15	Detroit Lions	
1980	Gary Johnson	17.5	15	San Diego Chargers	
1981	Joe Klecko†	20.5	16	New York Jets	
1982	Doug Martin	11.5	9	Minnesota Vikings	
1983	Mark Gastineau	19	16	New York Jets	
1984	Mark Gastineau (2)	22	16	New York Jets	
1985	Richard Dent†	17	16	Chicago Bears	
1986	Lawrence Taylor†	20.5	16	New York Giants	
1987	Reggie White†	21	12	Philadelphia Eagles	
1988	Reggie White† (2)	18	16	Philadelphia Eagles	
1989	Chris Doleman†	21	16	Minnesota Vikings	
1990	Derrick Thomas†	20	15	Kansas City Chiefs	
1991	Pat Swilling	17	16	New Orleans Saints	
1992	Clyde Simmons	19	16	Philadelphia Eagles	
1993	Neil Smith	15	16	Kansas City Chiefs	
1994	Kevin Greene†	14	16	Pittsburgh Steelers	
1995	Bryce Paup	17.5	15	Buffalo Bills	
1996	Kevin Greene† (2)	14.5	16	Carolina Panthers	
1997	John Randle†	15.5	16	Minnesota Vikings	
1998	Michael Sinclair	16.5	16	Seattle Seahawks	
1999	Kevin Carter	17	16	St. Louis Rams	
2000	La'Roi Glover	17	16	New Orleans Saints	
2001	Michael Strahan†	22.5	16	New York Giants	
2002	Jason Taylor†	18.5	16	Miami Dolphins	
2003	Michael Strahan† (2)	18.5	16	New York Giants	
2004	Dwight Freeney†	16	16	Indianapolis Colts	
2005	Derrick Burgess	16	16	Oakland Raiders	
2006	Shawne Merriman	17	12	San Diego Chargers	
2007	Jared Allen†	15.5	14	Kansas City Chiefs	
2008	DeMarcus Ware†	20	16	Dallas Cowboys	
2009	Elvis Dumervil	17	16	Denver Broncos	
2010	DeMarcus Ware† (2)	15.5	16	Dallas Cowboys	
2011	Jared Allen† (2)	22	16	Minnesota Vikings	
2012	J. J. Watt	20.5	16	Houston Texans	
2013	Robert Mathis	19.5	16	Indianapolis Colts	
2014	Justin Houston	22	16	Kansas City Chiefs	
2015	J. J. Watt (2)	17.5	16	Houston Texans	
2016	Vic Beasley	15.5	16	Atlanta Falcons	
2017	Chandler Jones	17	16	Arizona Cardinals	
2018	Aaron Donald	20.5	16	Los Angeles Rams	
2019	Shaquil Barrett	19.5	16	Tampa Bay Buccaneers	
2020	T. J. Watt^	15	15	Pittsburgh Steelers	
2021	T. J. Watt^ (2)	22.5	15	Pittsburgh Steelers	
2022	Nick Bosa^	18.5	16	San Francisco 49ers	
2023	T. J. Watt^ (3)	19	17	Pittsburgh Steelers	
2024	Trey Hendrickson^	17.5	17	Cincinnati Bengals	
2025	Myles Garrett^	23*	17	Cleveland Browns	

== AFL annual sacks leaders ==
Key
Symbol	Meaning
Leader	The player who recorded the most sacks
Sacks	Total number of sacks
GP	Number of games played during the season
*	Single-season record
(#)	Denotes the number of times a player appears in this list

AFL annual sacks leaders by season
Season	Leader	Sacks	GP	Team	Refs
1960	Mel Branch	10*	14	Dallas Texans	
1960	Riley Morris	10*	12	Oakland Raiders	
1961	Ed Husmann	8	14	Houston Oilers	
1961	Ron Nery	8	14	San Diego Chargers	
1962	Ed Husmann (2)	10	14	Houston Oilers	
1963	Larry Eisenhauer	8	14	Boston Patriots	
1964	Tom Sestak	15.5*	14	Buffalo Bills	
1965	Larry Eisenhauer (2)	9.5	14	Boston Patriots	
1966	Verlon Biggs	12.5	14	New York Jets	
1967	Ike Lassiter	17*	14	Oakland Raiders	
1968	Gerry Philbin	14	14	New York Jets	
1969	Steve DeLong	15.5	14	San Diego Chargers	

== Most seasons leading the league ==
Count	Player	Seasons	Team(s)	Ref.
5	Deacon Jones	1964, 1965, 1967, 1968, 1969	Los Angeles Rams	
3	T. J. Watt	2020, 2021, 2023	Pittsburgh Steelers	
2	Jared Allen	2007, 2011	Kansas City Chiefs / Minnesota Vikings	
2	Al Baker	1978, 1980	Detroit Lions	
2	Mark Gastineau	1983, 1984	New York Jets	
2	Kevin Greene	1994, 1998	Pittsburgh Steelers / Carolina Panthers	
2	Jim Katcavage	1962, 1963	New York Giants	
2	Michael Strahan	2001, 2003	New York Giants	
2	DeMarcus Ware	2008, 2010	Dallas Cowboys	
2	J. J. Watt	2012, 2015	Houston Texans	
2	Reggie White	1987, 1988	Philadelphia Eagles	
2	Jack Youngblood	1974, 1979	Los Angeles Rams	

== See also ==
- List of NFL career sacks leaders
- List of NFL annual interceptions leaders
- List of NFL annual forced fumbles leaders
