= Jared Allen =

American football player and curler (born 1982)

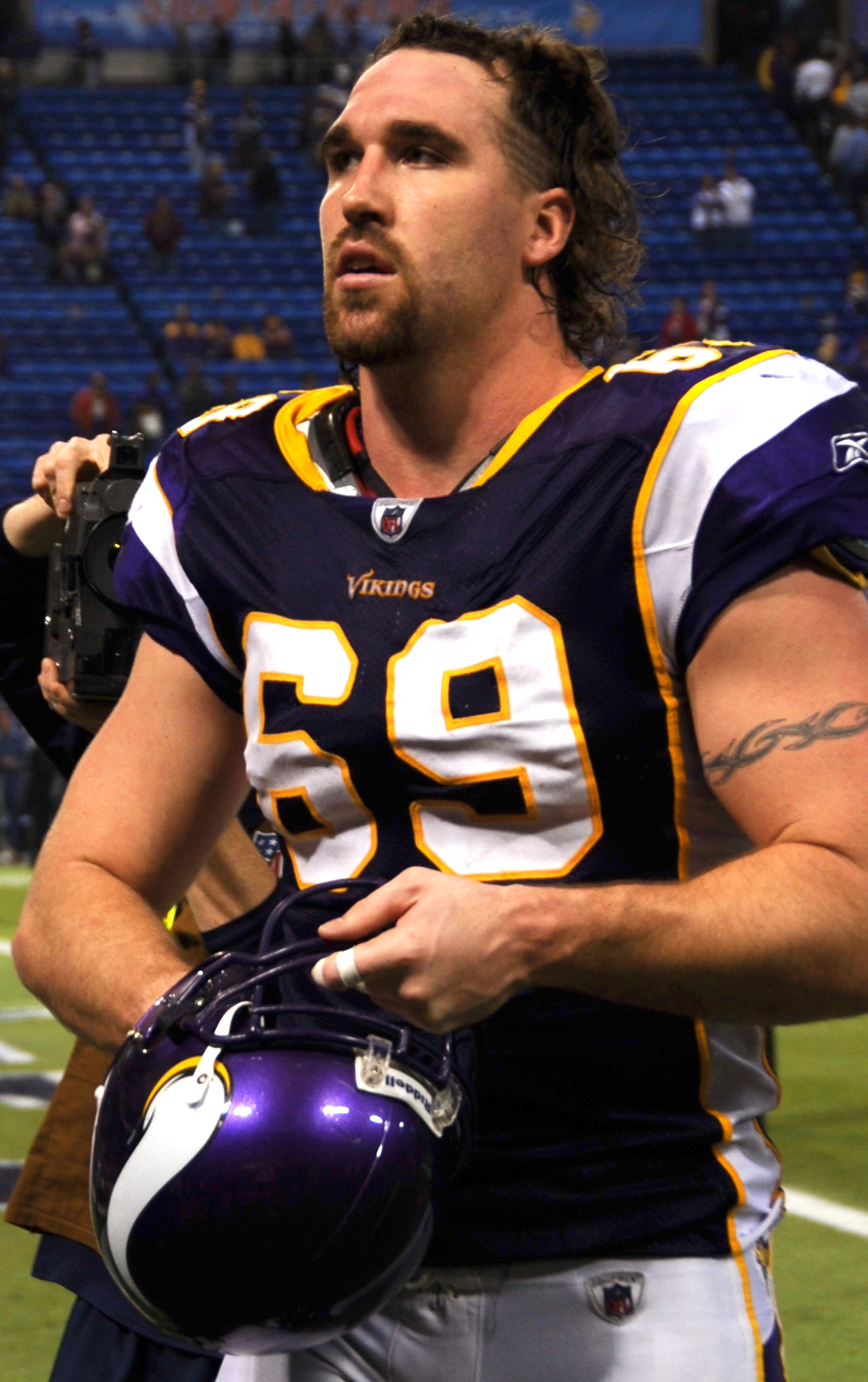
- Allen with the Minnesota Vikings in 2009

No. 69
- Position: Defensive end

Personal information
- Born: April 3, 1982 (age 44); Dallas, Texas, U.S.
- Listed height: 6 ft 6 in (1.98 m)
- Listed weight: 270 lb (122 kg)

Career information
- High school: Los Gatos (Los Gatos, California)
- College: Idaho State (2000–2003)
- NFL draft: 2004: 4th round, 126th overall pick

Career history
- Kansas City Chiefs (2004–2007); Minnesota Vikings (2008–2013); Chicago Bears (2014–2015); Carolina Panthers (2015)

Awards and highlights
- 4× First-team All-Pro (2007–2009, 2011); 5× Pro Bowl (2007–2009, 2011, 2012); 2× NFL sacks leader (2007, 2011); PFWA NFL All-Rookie Team (2004); Minnesota Vikings Ring of Honor; 50 Greatest Vikings; Buck Buchanan Award (2003); 2× first-team I-AA All-American (2002, 2003); 3× first-team All-BSC (2001–2003); Idaho State Bengals No. 41 retired; NFL records: Most career safeties: 4 (tied); Most safeties in a season: 2 (tied)

Career NFL statistics
- Total tackles: 648
- Sacks: 136
- Forced fumbles: 32
- Fumble recoveries: 19
- Pass deflections: 57
- Interceptions: 6
- Defensive touchdowns: 2
- Stats at Pro Football Reference
- Pro Football Hall of Fame

Jared Scot Allen (born April 3, 1982) is an American former professional football player who was a defensive end in the National Football League (NFL) for 12 seasons. A five-time Pro Bowler and four-time All-Pro selection, he recorded 136 career sacks. He was elected to the Pro Football Hall of Fame in 2025.

Allen played college football for the Idaho State Bengals and was selected by the Kansas City Chiefs in the fourth round of the 2004 NFL draft. After four years with the Chiefs, Allen was traded to the Minnesota Vikings in exchange for three draft picks, including a first rounder. He spent six years with the Vikings before joining the Chicago Bears as a free agent in 2014. He was traded to the Carolina Panthers during the 2015 season, with whom he played in Super Bowl 50. After retiring from the NFL, Allen took up curling and formed a team with other former NFL players.

== Early life ==
Allen was born in Dallas, Texas, and raised on a horse ranch in Morgan Hill, California.

Allen first attended Live Oak High School in Morgan Hill, but transferred to Los Gatos High School in Los Gatos for his senior year after he was expelled for selling stolen yearbooks. By then, Allen had lost many of his athletic scholarship offers, including from the University of Washington where he had already verbally committed. As a senior at Los Gatos, he was named first-team All-League and Defensive Player of the Year. He was also a first-team All-Central Coast Section selection, and a member of "Who's Who" in Sports Illustrated. Allen was selected by the North squad for the North vs. South San Jose Charlie Wedemeyer All-Star football game, after a senior season where he racked up 96 tackles, 12 sacks, five forced fumbles, and five fumble recoveries.

== College career ==
Allen attended Idaho State University, where he started 33 of 41 games for the Idaho State Bengals football team. The three-time All-Big Sky Conference selection finished his career with 250 tackles, 38.5 sacks, 73 stops for losses, seven fumble recoveries, three touchdowns, 13 forced fumbles, three interceptions, 26 pass deflections, and one blocked kick.

As a freshman in 2000, Allen was originally slated to redshirt the season, but this was reconsidered, and he eventually played in eight games for the Bengals and earned honorable mention All-Big Sky honors without ever being a starter. In 2001, Allen earned first-team All-Big Sky honors, and led the Bengals with 16 tackles for loss and 6.5 sacks. As a junior in 2002, Allen was named second-team Division I-AA All-American by the Associated Press, and was also named first-team All-Big Sky for the second consecutive season. He led the team in sacks, tackles for loss (with 18), and also led all Bengal linemen with 63 tackles.

In 2003, as a senior, Allen won the Buck Buchanan Award, recording 17.5 sacks, 102 tackles, 28 tackles for loss, six forced fumbles, three recovered fumbles, and nine pass deflections during 2003, ranking among the Big Sky Conference leaders in several defensive categories. Allen, a first-team Division I-AA All-American and a first-team All-Big Sky selection for the third straight season, led ISU to an 8–4 record that season, helping the school post its first back-to-back eight win seasons in school history. Idaho State finished the regular season ranked No. 21 in the nation.

== Professional career ==
=== 2004 NFL draft ===
Pre-draft measurables
Height	Weight	Arm length	Hand span	40-yard dash	10-yard split	20-yard split	20-yard shuttle	Three-cone drill	Vertical jump	Broad jump	Bench press	Wonderlic
6 ft 6 in (1.98 m)	265 lb (120 kg)	32 in (0.81 m)	9 3/8 in (0.24 m)	4.70 s	1.64 s	2.75 s	4.34 s	7.11 s	33 in (0.84 m)	10 ft 0 in (3.05 m)	13 reps	19
All values from NFL Combine

Before the draft, Allen was projected as a sixth or seventh round prospect; NFL columnist Rick Gosselin ranked Allen as the 19th-best defensive end in the draft. Scouts rated his prospects better as a long snapper than on defense, with some calling him the best snapper in the class. He ended up being taken by the Kansas City Chiefs in the fourth round.

=== Kansas City Chiefs ===
Allen was selected by the Kansas City Chiefs in the fourth round (126th overall) of the 2004 NFL draft, and made the league minimum salary his first three years. During his rookie season, Allen played 15 games, starting 10 of them, and made 9 sacks on 31 tackles. In 2005, Allen appeared in all 16 games (starting 15) with 55 tackles, 11 sacks, 5 passes defended, 6 forced fumbles and 2 fumble recoveries. In 2006, Allen started all 16 games with 77 tackles, 7.5 sacks, 1 interception, 10 passes defended, 5 forced fumbles and 6 fumble recoveries (joint most in the AFC). On May 21, 2007, Allen, as a restricted free agent, signed the Chiefs' one-year tender offer of US$2.35 million for the 2007 season. Allen credited his early season success to his mullet; with every sack Allen made, he was expected to shave a "racing stripe" into his hairstyle. On December 2, 2007, Allen caught a touchdown pass against division rival San Diego. On December 23, 2007, Allen caught another touchdown pass against the Detroit Lions.

After leading the NFL in sacks in 2007 with 15.5, Allen was selected as a starting defensive end for the AFC in the 2007 Pro Bowl and was also named in the All-Pro team for 2007.

In February 2008, the Chiefs placed the franchise tag on Allen, giving him a one-year, $8.8 million contract for 2008.

=== Minnesota Vikings ===
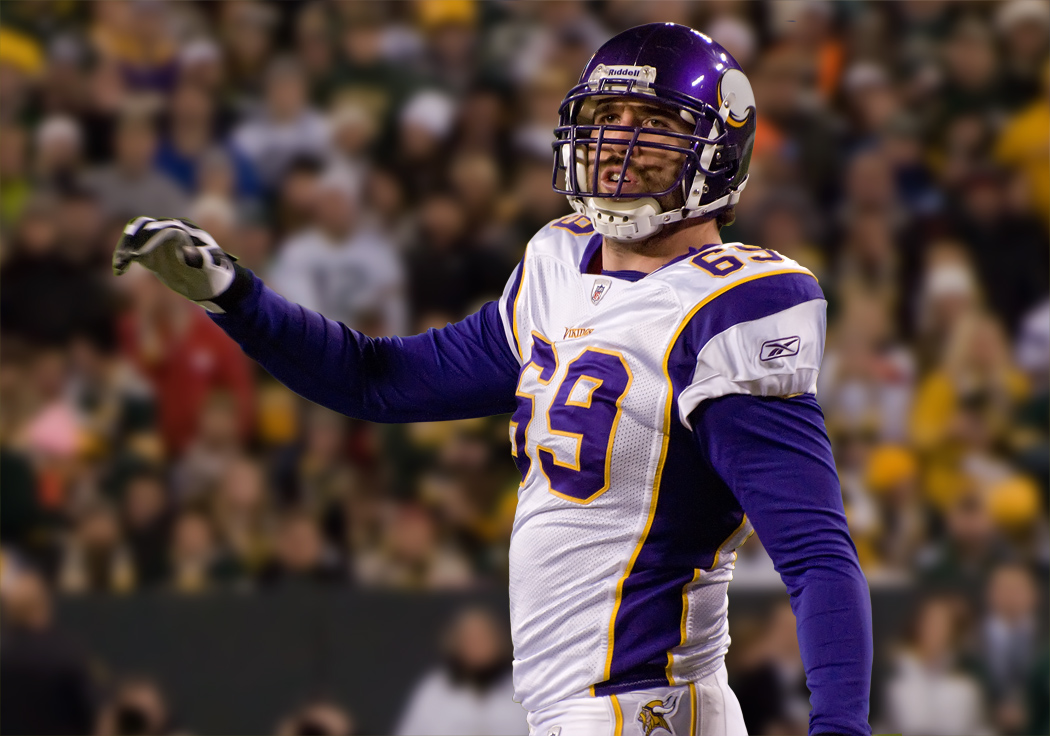
Allen with the Vikings in 2011

On April 22, 2008, the Chiefs traded Allen to the Minnesota Vikings in exchange for a first-round pick and two third-round picks (one of which was used to select Jamaal Charles), and the teams swapped sixth-round picks in the 2008 NFL draft. The Vikings then signed Allen to a six-year contract, which at the time was the richest contract for a defensive player in NFL history. Allen was due an $8 million roster bonus in 2010, per the six-year, $72.36 million contract he signed with the Vikings, and his signing bonus was $15.5 million.

During the 2008 season, Allen recorded 54 tackles, along with 14.5 sacks, 3 passes defended, 3 forced fumbles, and 2 enforced safeties, while battling both knee and shoulder injuries throughout the season. He was named First-team All-Pro and selected to his second Pro Bowl. His first sack as a Viking was in a game against the Indianapolis Colts, when he sacked quarterback Peyton Manning. In his first playoff game as a Viking, Allen recorded three tackles, along with two sacks and a forced fumble. Allen also forced a safety when he chased Dan Orlovsky out of the end zone during a game against the Detroit Lions, and he forced another safety in the week 10 game against the Green Bay Packers, when he sacked Aaron Rodgers in the end zone.

On October 5, 2009, against the Green Bay Packers, Allen set a career-high with 4.5 sacks, as well as having his third safety in the previous two years. A week later, against the St. Louis Rams, he returned a fumble 52 yards, for the first defensive touchdown of his career. He also made the 2009 Pro Bowl, as the starting defensive end for the NFC team. For the 2009 year, Allen made 51 tackles with 14.5 sacks, an interception, 4 passes defended, 5 forced fumbles, 3 fumble recoveries, a defensive touchdown, and a safety enforced.

Allen started the 2010 season slowly, having only one sack in the first 7 games, but had 10 sacks in the next 9 games, making him 10th in the league with 11 sacks. In the season finale against the Detroit Lions, Allen scored his second career defensive touchdown, a 36-yard interception return. Overall in 2010, Allen finished with 60 tackles, 11 sacks, 2 interceptions (one returned for a touchdown), 6 passes defended, a forced fumble, and a fumble recovery. He was ranked 80th by his fellow players on the NFL Top 100 Players of 2011.

In 2011, Allen returned to Kansas City. The Vikings lost the game 22–17. On January 1, 2012, Allen set the single-season franchise record for most sacks by a Viking, with 22 sacks. In Week 17 against the Chicago Bears, Allen sacked Josh McCown 3.5 times, but fell a half sack short of the NFL record held by former New York Giants defensive end Michael Strahan. Allen appeared on NFL's Top 100 players of 2012, and was ranked #13. Allen was voted 67 spots higher than last year, the biggest leap on the list. Allen fell seven votes short of winning AP NFL Defensive Player of the Year. On October 2, 2012, Allen was fined $7,875 for grabbing Tampa Bay Buccaneers lineman Donald Penn's facemask.

=== Chicago Bears ===
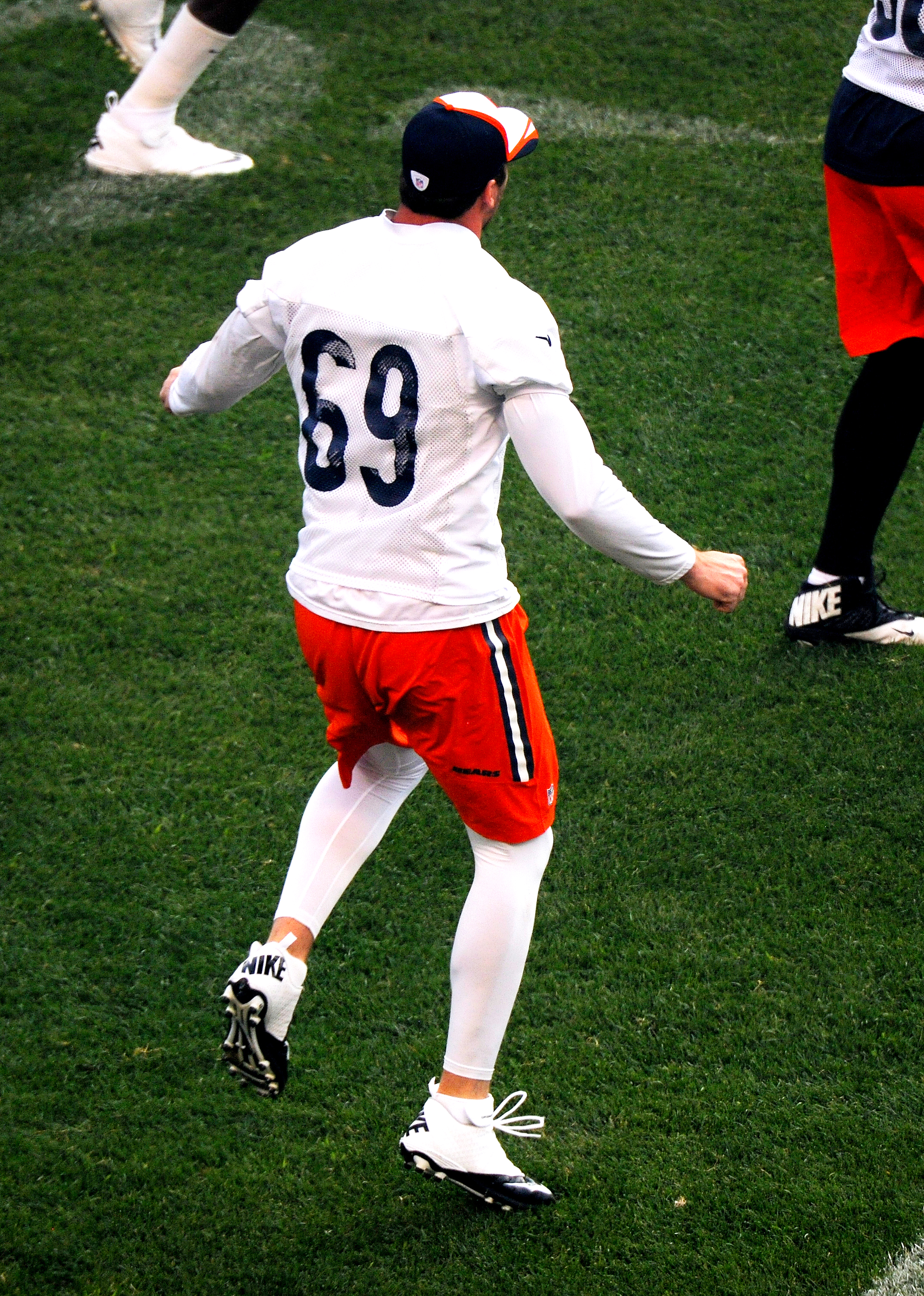
Allen participating in Chicago Bears training camp in 2014

On March 26, 2014, Allen signed a four-year deal with the Chicago Bears worth $32 million, of which $15.5 million is guaranteed, that could void down to three years and $24 million. Allen missed the week three game against the Green Bay Packers due to suffering from pneumonia and having lost 18 pounds. As a result, his streak of games played dating back to week two of 2007 ended. He finished 2014 with 52 tackles, 5.5 sacks, 4 passes defended, 2 forced fumbles, and 2 fumble recoveries.

With the Bears using a 3-4 defense for the 2015 season, Allen was transitioned to the outside linebacker position.

=== Carolina Panthers ===
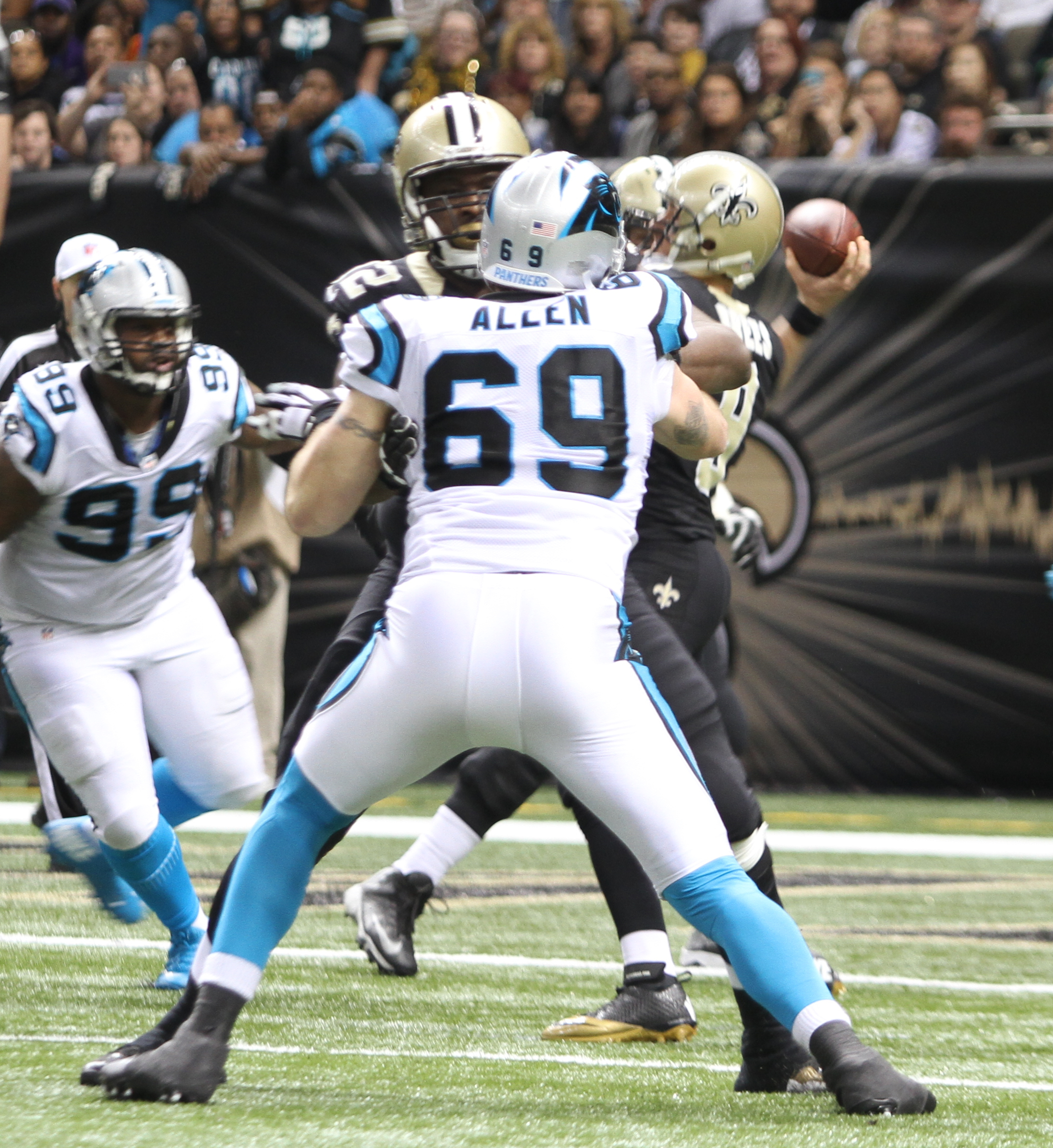
Allen playing for the Carolina Panthers in 2015

On September 28, 2015, Allen was traded to the Carolina Panthers for a conditional sixth-round pick in the 2016 NFL draft. Allen recorded his first sack for the Panthers during their 27–16 win over the Philadelphia Eagles; he recorded one tackle-for-loss, two quarterback pressures, and a pass deflection during the game. During a Monday Night Football victory over the Indianapolis Colts, Allen had his first sack as a member of the Panthers on quarterback Andrew Luck to go along with five total tackles. On February 7, 2016, Allen was part of the Panthers team that played in Super Bowl 50. In the game, the Panthers fell to the Denver Broncos by a score of 24–10. In the loss, Allen recorded one tackle.

=== Retirement ===
On February 18, 2016, Allen announced his retirement by posting a video to his Twitter account of him riding his horse "into the sunset." On April 14, 2016, Allen signed a one-day contract with Minnesota so he could retire as a Viking.

Allen first came up for Pro Football Hall of Fame eligibility in 2021, but failed to get inducted on the first ballot, as he was passed over in favor of fellow first-year eligibility mates Peyton Manning, Charles Woodson and Calvin Johnson.

On July 29, 2022, Allen was announced as the 27th inductee of the Minnesota Vikings Ring of Honor. On October 30, 2022, Allen was formally inducted into the Ring of Honor, riding into U.S. Bank Stadium on a horse. He was announced as a member of the 2025 Pro Football Hall of Fame class at the 14th NFL Honors.

== Career statistics ==
Legend
	NFL record
	Led the league
**Bold**	Career high

=== NFL ===
==== Regular season ====
Year	Team	Games		Tackles					Fumbles				Interceptions					
Year	Team	GP	GS	Cmb	Solo	Ast	Sck	Sfty	FF	FR	Yds	TD	PD	Int	Yds	Avg	Lng	TD
2004	KC	15	10	31	29	2	9.0	0	0	0	0	0	0	0	0	0.0	0	0
2005	KC	16	15	55	48	7	11.0	0	**6**	2	0	0	5	0	0	0.0	0	0
2006	KC	16	16	**77**	**65**	12	7.5	0	5	**6**	24	0	10	1	3	3.0	3	0
2007	KC	14	14	64	55	9	15.5	0	3	0	0	0	**11**	0	0	0.0	0	0
2008	MIN	16	16	54	41	13	14.5	**2**	3	0	0	0	3	0	0	0.0	0	0
2009	MIN	16	16	51	43	8	14.5	1	5	3	**54**	**1**	4	1	−4	−4.0	−4	0
2010	MIN	16	16	60	45	15	11.0	0	1	1	0	0	6	**2**	**40**	**20.0**	**36**	**1**
2011	MIN	16	16	66	48	18	**22.0**	1	4	4	6	0	3	1	14	14.0	14	0
2012	MIN	16	16	45	35	10	12.0	0	1	1	0	0	3	0	0	0.0	0	0
2013	MIN	16	16	52	33	**19**	11.5	0	2	0	0	0	6	0	0	0.0	0	0
2014	CHI	15	15	56	37	**19**	5.5	0	2	2	0	0	4	0	0	0.0	0	0
2015	CHI	3	3	5	4	1	0.0	0	0	0	0	0	1	1	2	2.0	2	0
2015	CAR	12	12	27	15	12	2.0	0	0	0	0	0	2	0	0	0.0	0	0
Career		187	181	643	498	145	136.0	4	32	19	84	1	58	6	55	9.2	36	1

==== Postseason ====
Year	Team	Games		Tackles					Fumbles				Interceptions					
Year	Team	GP	GS	Cmb	Solo	Ast	Sck	Sfty	FF	FR	Yds	TD	PD	Int	Yds	Avg	Lng	TD
2006	KC	1	1	**8**	**6**	**2**	0.0	0	0	0	0	0	0	0	0	0.0	0	0
2008	MIN	1	1	3	3	0	**2.0**	0	1	0	0	0	1	0	0	0.0	0	0
2009	MIN	2	2	6	4	**2**	1.0	0	**2**	0	0	0	**2**	0	0	0.0	0	0
2012	MIN	1	1	6	5	1	1.0	0	0	0	0	0	0	0	0	0.0	0	0
2015	CAR	2	2	1	1	0	0.0	0	0	0	0	0	0	0	0	0.0	0	0
Career		7	7	24	19	5	4.0	0	3	0	0	0	3	0	0	0.0	0	0

=== College ===
Season	GP	Tackles					Int		Fum	
Season	GP	Cmb	Solo	Ast	TfL	Sck	PD	Int	FF	FR
2000	8	39	13	26	11	4.0	0	**1**	0	0
2001	10	49	24	25	16	6.5	2	**1**	3	**3**
2002	11	63	30	33	18	10.5	7	**1**	4	1
2003	12	**102**	**48**	**54**	**28**	**17.5**	**9**	0	**6**	**3**
Career	41	253	115	138	71	38.5	26	3	13	7

== Career highlights ==
=== Awards and honors ===
NFL

- 4× First-team All-Pro (2007–2009, 2011)
- 5× Pro Bowl (2007–2009, 2011, 2012)
- 2× NFL sacks leader (2007, 2011)
- PFWA NFL All-Rookie Team (2004)
- Minnesota Vikings Ring of Honor
- 50 Greatest Vikings
- 100 sacks club
- Ranked No. 80 in the Top 100 Players of 2011
- Ranked No. 13 in the Top 100 Players of 2012
- Ranked No. 60 in the Top 100 Players of 2013
- Ranked No. 68 in the Top 100 Players of 2014

College

- Buck Buchanan Award (2003)
- 2× first-team I-AA All-American (2002, 2003)
- 3× first-team All-BSC (2001–2003)
- Idaho State Bengals No. 41 retired

=== Records ===
==== NFL records ====
- Most consecutive games with at least .5 sack: 11 (2004–2014, tied with Chris Jones, Trey Hendrickson, Nnamdi Madubuike, and Shaun Ellis)
- Most safeties in a career: 4 (tied with Ted Hendricks, Doug English, and Justin Houston)

==== Vikings franchise records ====
- Most sacks in a season: 22 (2011)
- Most safeties in a season: 2 (2008)

== Curling ==
Since his retirement from football, Allen has picked up the sport of curling. In March 2018 he recruited fellow retired NFL players Marc Bulger, Keith Bulluck, and Michael Roos to form a competitive curling team. He first competed in a World Curling Tour event, the 2018 Curl Mesabi Classic, losing all four games, including one against the 2018 Olympics gold medal-winning team, 11–3. His team then played in the 2019 US Men's Challenge Round (a qualifying event for the United States Men's Curling Championship), losing all three of their games, by a combined score of 27–3. The team then played in the Ed Werenich Golden Wrench Classic, again going winless.

Allen played in the 2021 United States Men's Curling Championship playing second for 2007 US Champion Todd Birr. At nationals, the team went 0–9. Allen competed in the 2024 United States Men's Curling Championship with Team Ruohonen led by skip Rich Ruohonen. Allen played lead.

In April 2024 it was announced that Allen, as well as Canadian curlers John Morris, and Jennifer Jones, were part of a sports business venture, The Curling Group, which purchased ownership and operations of the Grand Slam of Curling series from Sportsnet.

In November 2025, Allen teamed up with former U.S. Olympian Jason Smith and retired Canadian champions Wayne Middaugh and John Morris to compete as an "all-star" team on a sponsor's exemption into the 2025 GSOC Tahoe.

== Legal issues ==
Allen has been arrested/charged for DUI a total of three times. The first was in Pocatello, Idaho, on May 11, 2002. He was then arrested twice within five months in Leawood, Kansas, on May 11, 2006, and on September 26, 2006. He was sentenced to 48 hours in jail as a result of the latter arrest.

== Personal life ==
Allen is a Christian. Allen has spoken about his faith saying, "My Bible's my playbook for life" and "My ultimate goal is when I die, for Him to say, 'Welcome home, you good and faithful servant.' That’s how I try to gear my life and focus on Him."

Allen serves as an advocate for the Juvenile Diabetes Research Foundation, and raises funds through his "Sack Diabetes" program. Allen was also an active role model in the JDRF's Children's Congress 2009. He is an avid hunter, and has been interviewed by Field & Stream.

Allen was among four NFL players who were sent overseas on an NFL-USO tour to visit with U.S. military troops: "It has been one of the best experiences of my life – something that I'll never forget. We as players probably get more out of it than you do as soldiers and Marines." He created his own charity, the Jared Allen's Homes for Wounded Warriors (JAH4WW), in October 2009, in order to build handicapped-accessible homes for severely wounded military personnel returning from Iraq and Afghanistan. His grandfather and younger brother also served in the Marines.

In September 2010, Allen contributed $3,000 to Downey, California, animal shelter SEACCA's reward fund for information leading to an arrest, in connection to a horse being starved and abandoned on a Los Angeles city street.

Allen was featured in the 2010 film Jackass 3D, doing a stunt, alongside Erik Ainge, which features him blindsiding Johnny Knoxville.

On October 27, 2011, Allen's wife, Amy, gave birth to their first child, a girl named Brinley Noelle Allen.

The Alliance of American Football named Allen as an investor and player relations executive in 2018.
