= NFL Top 100 Players of 2021 =

- Season 2021
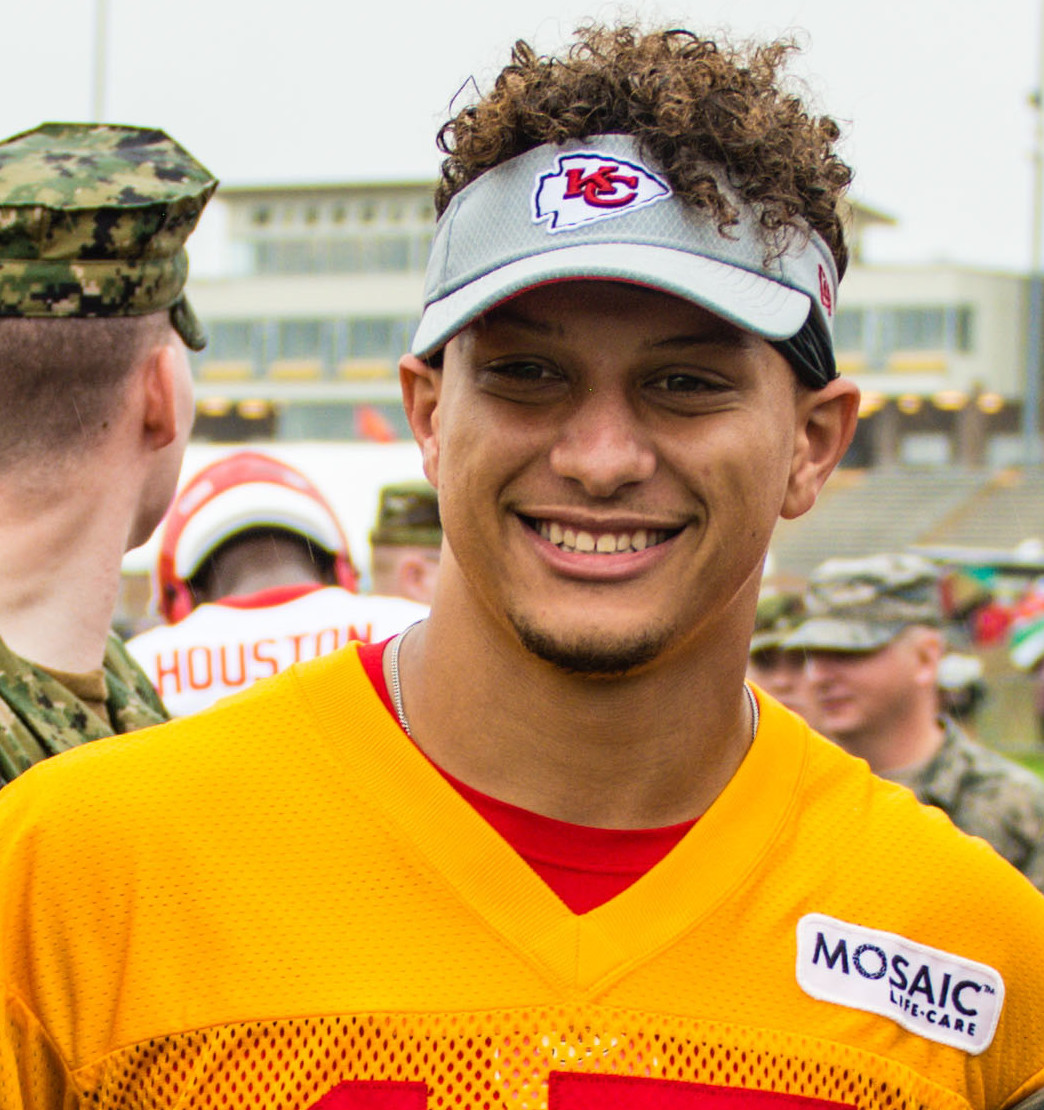
- Patrick Mahomes, the number 1 ranked player

Release
- Original network: NFL Network
- Original release: August 15 – August 28, 2021

Season chronology
- ← Previous; 2020 Next → 2022

The NFL Top 100 Players of 2021 is the eleventh season in the NFL Top 100 series. It premiered on August 15, 2021, and concluded on August 28, 2021. Kansas City Chiefs quarterback Patrick Mahomes was named the number one player.

== Episode list ==
Episode No.	Air date	Numbers revealed
1	August 15	100–91
2	August 15	90–81
3	August 15	80–71
4	August 15	70–61
5	August 15	60–51
6	August 15	50–41
7	August 22	40–31
8	August 22	30–21
9	August 22	20–11
10	August 28	10–6
11	August 28	5–1

== The list ==
Rank	Player	Position	2020 team	2021 team	Rank change	Reference	Year accomplishments
1	Patrick Mahomes	Quarterback	Kansas City Chiefs		▲3		Second consecutive AFC Championship; 3rd Pro Bowl selection; 1st Second-team All-Pro selection; Became the fastest quarterback to reach 10,000 passing yards (34 games); Became the fastest quarterback to reach 100 passing touchdowns (40 games); Broke NFL records for career passing yards per game (307.7), career quarterback rating (108.7), and career interception percentage (1.4%, tied) by recording his 1,500th pass attempt
2	Aaron Donald	Defensive tackle	Los Angeles Rams		▲1		NFC Defensive Player of the Week (Week 5); 3rd AP DPOY Award; 6th First-team All-Pro selection; 7th Pro Bowl selection
3	Aaron Rodgers	Quarterback	Green Bay Packers		▲13		11th player to pass for 50,000 career yards; Threw 400th career touchdown pass; NFC Offensive Player of the Week (Week 13); NFC Offensive Player of the Month (December); Led league in touchdown passes (48, career high); 3rd AP MVP Award; 3rd First-team All-Pro selection; 9th Pro Bowl selection
4	Derrick Henry	Running back	Tennessee Titans		▲6		2× AFC Offensive Player of the Week (Week 6, 17); Led league in rushing yards (2,027) and rushing touchdowns (17); 8th 2,000 yard rushing season in NFL history; 1st AP OPOY Award; 1st First-team All-Pro selection; 2nd Pro Bowl selection
5	Travis Kelce	Tight end	Kansas City Chiefs		▲13		Broke single season tight end receiving yards record (1,416); Broke record for 1,000 receiving yards seasons by a tight end; 3rd First-team All-Pro selection; 6th Pro Bowl selection; League leader among tight ends in receiving yards and touchdowns
6	Davante Adams	Wide receiver	Green Bay Packers		▲51		First team All-Pro selection; 4th consecutive Pro Bowl selection; Career high in receptions (115); Led league in touchdown catches (18)
7	Tom Brady	Quarterback	Tampa Bay Buccaneers		▲7		NFC Offensive Player of the Week (Week 4); 7th Super Bowl championship; 5th Super Bowl MVP award
8	DeAndre Hopkins	Wide receiver	Arizona Cardinals		0		NFC Offensive Player of the Week (Week 10); tied career high in receptions (105); 2nd Second-team All-Pro selection; 5th Pro Bowl selection
9	T. J. Watt	Outside linebacker	Pittsburgh Steelers		▲16		AFC Defensive Player of the Week (Week 2); 2× AFC Defensive Player of the Month (September, November); Led league in sacks (15); AFC Defensive Player of the Year; 2nd First-team All-Pro selection; 3rd Pro Bowl selection
10	Josh Allen	Quarterback	Buffalo Bills		▲77		4× AFC Offensive Player of the Week (Weeks 2, 9, 13, 15); 2× AFC Offensive Player of the Month (September, December); Career highs in completions (396), passing yards (4,544) and passing touchdowns (37); 1st Second-team All-Pro selection; 1st Pro Bowl selection
11	Stefon Diggs	Wide receiver	Buffalo Bills		▲43		AFC Offensive Player of the Week (Week 16); Led league in receptions (127) and yards receiving (1,535) (both career highs); 1st First-team All-Pro selection; 1st Pro Bowl selection
12	Russell Wilson	Quarterback	Seattle Seahawks		▼10		2× NFC Offensive Player of the Week (Week 1, 3); NFC Offensive Player of the Month (September); Career highs in pass completions (384) and touchdown passes (40); Walter Payton Man of the Year; 8th Pro Bowl selection
13	Jalen Ramsey	Cornerback	Los Angeles Rams		▲24		2nd First-team All-Pro selection; 4th Pro Bowl selection
14	Alvin Kamara	Running back	New Orleans Saints		▲28		Tied NFL record for most rushing touchdowns in a game (6); NFC Offensive Player of the Week (Week 16); Career highs in rushing yards (932) and touchdowns (16); 2nd Second-team All-Pro selection
15	Tyreek Hill	Wide receiver	Kansas City Chiefs		▲7		AFC Offensive Player of the Week (Week 12); Career highs in receptions (87) and touchdowns (15); 3rd First-team All-Pro selection; 5th Pro Bowl selection
16	Myles Garrett	Defensive end	Cleveland Browns		▲64		AFC Defensive Player of the Week (Week 4); AFC Defensive Player of the Month (October); 1st First-team All-Pro selection; 2nd Pro Bowl selection
17	Xavien Howard	Cornerback	Miami Dolphins		NR		Led league in interceptions (10) (2nd time in career) and passes defensed (20); 1st First-Team All-Pro selection; 2nd Pro Bowl selection
18	Deshaun Watson	Quarterback	Houston Texans		▲2		AFC Offensive Player of the Week (Week 11); Career high in completions (382); Led league in passing yards (4,823); 3rd Pro Bowl selection
19	Budda Baker	Free safety	Arizona Cardinals		▲78		NFC Defensive Player of the Week (Week 6); NFC Defensive Player of the Month (October); Tied career high in sacks (2); 2nd First-team All-Pro selection; 3rd Pro Bowl selection
20	Dalvin Cook	Running back	Minnesota Vikings		▲1		2× NFC Offensive Player of the Week (Week 8, 9); NFC Offensive Player of the Month (November); Career highs in rushing yards (1,557) and rushing touchdowns (16); 2nd Pro Bowl selection
21	Fred Warner	Linebacker	San Francisco 49ers		▲49		NFC Defensive Player of the Week (Week 16); Career high in interceptions (2); 1st First-team All-Pro selection; 1st Pro Bowl selection
22	DK Metcalf	Wide receiver	Seattle Seahawks		▲59		Career highs in receptions (83), yards (1,303), and touchdowns (10); 1st Second-team All-Pro selection; 1st Pro Bowl selection
23	Khalil Mack	Outside linebacker	Chicago Bears		▼4		1st Second-team All-Pro selection; 6th Pro Bowl selection
24	Lamar Jackson	Quarterback	Baltimore Ravens		▼23		First NFL quarterback to have multiple seasons surpassing 1,000 rushing yards
25	Bobby Wagner	Middle linebacker	Seattle Seahawks		▼12		NFC Defensive Player of the Week (Week 8); 6th First-team All-Pro selection; 7th Pro Bowl selection
26	Nick Chubb	Running back	Cleveland Browns		▲10		Career high in rushing touchdowns (12); 2nd Pro Bowl selection
27	DeForest Buckner	Defensive tackle	Indianapolis Colts		▲29		AFC Defensive Player of the Week (Week 15); AFC Defensive Player of the Month (December); Tied career-high in forced fumbles (2); 1st First-Team All-Pro selection
28	Devin White	Linebacker	Tampa Bay Buccaneers		NR		Career highs in tackles (97), sacks (9) and passes defensed (4); 2× NFC Defensive Player of the Week (7, 15); Super Bowl champion (1st time)
29	Julio Jones	Wide receiver	Atlanta Falcons	Tennessee Titans	▼18		
30	Aaron Jones	Running back	Green Bay Packers		▲3		Career high in rushing yards (1,104); 1st Pro Bowl selection
31	Jamal Adams	Strong safety	Seattle Seahawks		▼4		Career high in sacks (9 1/2); 2nd Second-Team All-Pro selection; 3rd Pro Bowl selection
32	Joey Bosa	Defensive end	Los Angeles Chargers		▲2		2nd First-Team All-Pro selection; 3rd Pro Bowl selection
33	Quenton Nelson	Guard	Indianapolis Colts		▼4		3rd First-Team All-Pro selection; 3rd Pro Bowl selection
34	Chris Jones	Defensive tackle	Kansas City Chiefs		▲18		Tied career high in sacks (13); 2nd Second-Team All-Pro selection; 2nd Pro Bowl selection
35	Darren Waller	Tight end	Las Vegas Raiders		▲64		1st Pro Bowl selection; Career highs in receiving yards (1,196) and touchdown receptions (9); Led league in receptions among tight ends (107)
36	David Bakhtiari	Offensive tackle	Green Bay Packers		▲26		2nd First-Team All-Pro selection; 3rd Pro Bowl selection
37	Shaquille Leonard	Outside linebacker	Indianapolis Colts		▲13		Career high in fumbles recovered (2); AFC Defensive Player of the Week (Week 17); 2nd First-Team All-Pro selection; 2nd Pro Bowl selection
38	Marlon Humphrey	Cornerback	Baltimore Ravens		▲48		Career high in tackles (68); Led league in forced fumbles (8); 2nd Pro Bowl selection
39	Kyler Murray	Quarterback	Arizona Cardinals		▲51		3× NFC Offensive Player of the Week (5, 7, 15); Career highs in completions (375), passing yards (3,971) and touchdown passes (26); 1st Pro Bowl selection
40	Bradley Chubb	Outside linebacker	Denver Broncos		NR		1st Pro Bowl selection
41	Jaire Alexander	Cornerback	Green Bay Packers		NR		1st Second-Team All-Pro selection; 1st Pro Bowl selection
42	Trent Williams	Offensive tackle	San Francisco 49ers		NR		8th Pro Bowl selection
43	Lavonte David	Linebacker	Tampa Bay Buccaneers		▲57		NFC Defensive Player of the Month (September); Super Bowl champion (1st time); 2nd Second-Team All-Pro selection
44	Christian McCaffrey	Running back	Carolina Panthers		▼38		
45	Justin Simmons	Free safety	Denver Broncos		NR		Career highs in tackles (75) and interceptions (5); 1st Pro Bowl selection
46	Cameron Jordan	Defensive end	New Orleans Saints		▼23		NFC Defensive Player of the Month (November); 6th Pro Bowl selection
47	Stephon Gilmore	Cornerback	New England Patriots	New England Patriots/Carolina Panthers	▼38		4th Pro Bowl selection
48	Mike Evans	Wide receiver	Tampa Bay Buccaneers		▼18		Career high in touchdown receptions (13); Super Bowl champion (1st time); Record 7th consecutive season with 1,000 yards receiving
49	J. C. Jackson	Cornerback	New England Patriots		NR		Career high in interceptions (9)
50	George Kittle	Tight end	San Francisco 49ers		▼43		
51	Za'Darius Smith	Outside linebacker	Green Bay Packers		▼3		NFC Defensive Player of the Week (Week 4); 1st Second-Team All-Pro selection; 2nd Pro Bowl selection
52	Minkah Fitzpatrick	Free safety	Pittsburgh Steelers		▼17		Career high in tackles (60); 2nd First-Team All-Pro selection; 2nd Pro Bowl selection
53	Justin Jefferson	Wide receiver	Minnesota Vikings		NR		1st Second-Team All-Pro selection; 1st Pro Bowl selection; PFWA All-Rookie Team
54	Grady Jarrett	Defensive tackle	Atlanta Falcons		▲37		2nd Pro Bowl selection
55	Keenan Allen	Wide receiver	Los Angeles Chargers		▲22		Tied career high in touchdown receptions (8); 4th Pro Bowl selection
56	Justin Herbert	Quarterback	Los Angeles Chargers		NR		2× Offensive Rookie of the Month (October, November); AP Offensive Rookie of the Year; PFWA All-Rookie Team
57	Cameron Heyward	Defensive tackle	Pittsburgh Steelers		▲27		Recorded first interception of career (Week 1); 1st Second-Team All-Pro selection; 4th Pro Bowl selection
58	Tyrann Mathieu	Safety	Kansas City Chiefs		▼19		Career high in interceptions (6); 3rd First-Team All-Pro selection; 2nd Pro Bowl selection
59	Jason Pierre-Paul	Outside linebacker	Tampa Bay Buccaneers		NR		Career high in interceptions (2); Super Bowl champion (2nd time); 3rd Pro Bowl selection
60	Corey Linsley	Center	Green Bay Packers	Los Angeles Chargers	NR		1st First-Team All-Pro selection
61	Chase Young	Defensive end	Washington Football Team		NR		NFC Defensive Player of the Month (December 2020); AP NFL Defensive Rookie of the Year; 1st Pro Bowl selection; PFWA All-Rookie Team
62	A. J. Brown	Wide receiver	Tennessee Titans		NR		Career highs in receptions (70), yards (1,075) and touchdown catches (11); 1st Pro Bowl selection
63	Fletcher Cox	Defensive tackle	Philadelphia Eagles		▲10		6th Pro Bowl selection
64	Demario Davis	Inside linebacker	New Orleans Saints		▲3		1st Second-Team All-Pro selection
65	Calvin Ridley	Wide receiver	Atlanta Falcons		NR		Career highs in receptions (90) and yards receiving (1,374); 1st Second-Team All-Pro selection
66	J. J. Watt	Defensive end	Houston Texans	Arizona Cardinals	▼21		Recorded 100th career sack (Week 9)
67	K. J. Wright	Outside linebacker	Seattle Seahawks	Las Vegas Raiders	NR		
68	Josh Jacobs	Running back	Las Vegas Raiders		▲4		Career high in rushing touchdowns (12); 1st Pro Bowl selection
69	Ryan Kelly	Center	Indianapolis Colts		NR		1st Second-Team All-Pro selection; 2nd Pro Bowl selection
70	Eric Kendricks	Linebacker	Minnesota Vikings		▲13		Career high in interceptions (3)
71	Baker Mayfield	Quarterback	Cleveland Browns		NR		AFC Offensive Player of the Week (Week 7)
72	Michael Thomas	Wide receiver	New Orleans Saints		▼67		
73	Trey Hendrickson	Defensive end	New Orleans Saints	Cincinnati Bengals	NR		Career highs in tackles (22) and sacks (13 1/2)
74	James Bradberry	Cornerback	New York Giants		NR		Career high in passes defensed (18); Tied career high in interceptions (3); 1st Pro Bowl selection
75	Laremy Tunsil	Offensive tackle	Houston Texans		▼9		2nd Pro Bowl selection
76	Tyler Lockett	Wide receiver	Seattle Seahawks		▼11		Career highs in receptions (100) and touchdown catches (10)
77	Quandre Diggs	Free safety	Seattle Seahawks		NR		Career highs in passes defensed (10) and interceptions (5); 1st Pro Bowl selection
78	Jeffery Simmons	Defensive tackle	Tennessee Titans		NR		AFC Defensive Player of the Week (Week 9); Career highs in tackles (24), sacks (3) and passes defensed (3)
79	Terron Armstead	Offensive tackle	New Orleans Saints		NR		3rd Pro Bowl selection
80	Adam Thielen	Wide receiver	Minnesota Vikings		NR		Career high in touchdown receptions (14)
81	Chris Godwin	Wide receiver	Tampa Bay Buccaneers		▼43		Super Bowl champion (1st time)
82	Garett Bolles	Offensive tackle	Denver Broncos		NR		1st Second-Team All-Pro selection; PFWA All-AFC Team
83	Ryan Tannehill	Quarterback	Tennessee Titans		▼15		Career high in touchdown passes (33)
84	Leonard Williams	Defensive end	New York Giants		NR		2× NFC Defensive Player of the Week (13, 17)
85	Zack Martin	Guard	Dallas Cowboys		▼30		
86	Marshon Lattimore	Cornerback	New Orleans Saints		▼10		Career high in tackles (52); 3rd Pro Bowl selection
87	Allen Robinson	Wide receiver	Chicago Bears		▲6		Career high in receptions (102)
88	Shaquil Barrett	Outside linebacker	Tampa Bay Buccaneers		▼56		Recorded 1st Career safety (Week 3); NFC Defensive Player of the Week (Week 3); Super Bowl champion (2nd time)
89	Tristan Wirfs	Offensive tackle	Tampa Bay Buccaneers		NR		Super Bowl champion (1st time); PFWA All-Rookie Team
90	Jessie Bates	Safety	Cincinnati Bengals		NR		Career highs in tackles (78), passes defensed (15) and interceptions (3); 1st Second-Team All-Pro selection
91	Corey Davis	Wide receiver	Tennessee Titans	New York Jets	NR		Career highs in receiving yards (945) and touchdown catches (5)
92	Jason Kelce	Center	Philadelphia Eagles		▲2		4th Pro Bowl selection
93	T. J. Hockenson	Tight end	Detroit Lions		NR		Career highs in receptions (67), yards (723) and touchdown catches (6); 1st Pro Bowl selection
94	Jarvis Landry	Wide receiver	Cleveland Browns		▼33		6th Pro Bowl selection
95	Tre'Davious White	Cornerback	Buffalo Bills		▼48		1st Second-Team All-Pro selection; 2nd Pro Bowl selection
96	Cole Beasley	Wide receiver	Buffalo Bills		NR		Career highs in receptions (82) and receiving yards (967); 1st Second-Team All-Pro selection
97	Kyle Juszczyk	Fullback	San Francisco 49ers		NR		Career highs in rushing yards (64) and rushing touchdowns (2)
98	Brandon Scherff	Guard	Washington Football Team		NR		4th Pro Bowl selection; 1st First-Team All-Pro selection
99	Brandon Graham	Defensive end	Philadelphia Eagles		NR		
100	James Robinson	Running back	Jacksonville Jaguars		NR		Offensive Rookie of the Month (September 2020); PFWA All-Rookie Team

=== Sources ===
- 2021 Pro Bowl rosters:
- 2020 All-Pro Team:
- PFWA All-Rookie Team:

== Reception ==
=== Players ===
Arizona Cardinals tackle D. J. Humphries criticized the list and its voting process, disagreeing with the placement of players such as J. J. Watt and DeAndre Hopkins.
