= 2021 Pro Bowl =

National Football League all-star game

2021 NFL Pro Bowl
- Date: January 31, 2021
- Stadium: Game canceled due to the COVID-19 pandemic. Alternative festivities were held in its place, including an esports exhibition game featuring the Pro Bowl rosters in Madden NFL 21 controlled by teams of NFL players, alumni, and celebrity guests, the game was won by the NFC 32–12

The 2021 Pro Bowl was to be the National Football League (NFL) all-star game for the 2020 NFL season, originally scheduled to be played on January 31, 2021, at Allegiant Stadium in Paradise, Nevada.

On October 14, 2020, the NFL announced that it had canceled the game due to the COVID-19 pandemic, and had deferred Las Vegas's hosting of the game to 2022. The league still conducted a fan vote to determine the Pro Bowl rosters, and instead organized alternative festivities such as Verzuz "highlight battles" featuring NFL players; and an esports exhibition featuring a game of Madden NFL 21 played with the Pro Bowl rosters (controlled by teams of NFL players, alumni, and celebrity guests) that was won by the NFC 32–12.

== Background ==
The original site for the game was announced on June 16, 2020. The Las Vegas Raiders' home Allegiant Stadium's bid won out over Camping World Stadium in Orlando, Florida, and SoFi Stadium in the Los Angeles metro area.

On October 14, 2020, the league decided to cancel the game amid the COVID-19 pandemic, and Allegiant Stadium was awarded the 2022 Pro Bowl instead. The league further announced that voting would still occur for Pro Bowl rosters for the 2020 season (as Pro Bowl roster selections impact salary clauses in rookie contracts), and that they would instead hold alternative events to honor the players chosen. Voting began on November 17, 2020, on the NFL's website and Madden NFL 21, and on Twitter starting on December 1. Voting on all platforms then ended on December 17 with the rosters being announced on December 21.

== Alternative events ==
The NFL partnered with Verzuz to air a series of Pro Bowl "highlight battles" from January 26 through 29.

ABC, ESPN, and Disney XD aired a television special on January 31 in place of the game—the Pro Bowl Celebration—which was presented by ESPN's NFL studio analysts, and featured segments and interviews honoring the Pro Bowl roster.

== Pro Bowl esports exhibition ==
The esports exhibition was played from the respective homes of several players and celebrities. In order, quarterback Deshaun Watson (Houston Texans), former wide receiver Keyshawn Johnson, running back Derrick Henry (Tennessee Titans), and rapper Snoop Dogg each played one quarter as the AFC team, while quarterback Kyler Murray (Arizona Cardinals), NASCAR Cup Series driver Bubba Wallace (23XI Racing), strong safety Jamal Adams (Seattle Seahawks), and former running back Marshawn Lynch each played one quarter as the NFC team.

=== Esports box score ===
2021 Pro Bowl: AFC vs NFC

Quarter	1	2	3	4	Total
AFC	6	0	6	0	12
NFC	7	19	6	0	32

at N/A (Madden NFL 21)

- Date: January 31, 2021
- Game time: 5:00 p.m. EST
- Source: NFL Pro Bowl: Madden '21 Edition on YouTube

== AFC roster ==
=== Offense ===
Position	Starter(s)	Reserve(s)
Quarterback	15 Patrick Mahomes, Kansas City	17 Josh Allen, Buffalo; 4 Deshaun Watson, Houston
Running back	22 Derrick Henry, Tennessee	24 Nick Chubb, Cleveland; 28 Josh Jacobs, Las Vegas
Fullback	42 Patrick Ricard, Baltimore	
Wide receiver	10 Tyreek Hill, Kansas City; 14 Stefon Diggs, Buffalo	13 Keenan Allen, LA Chargers; 11 A. J. Brown, Tennessee
Tight end	87 Travis Kelce, Kansas City	83 Darren Waller, Las Vegas
Offensive tackle	72 Eric Fisher, Kansas City; 78 Laremy Tunsil, Houston	78 Orlando Brown Jr., Baltimore
Offensive guard	75 Joel Bitonio, Cleveland; 56 Quenton Nelson, Indianapolis	66 David DeCastro, Pittsburgh
Center	53 Maurkice Pouncey, Pittsburgh	78 Ryan Kelly, Indianapolis

=== Defense ===
Position	Starter(s)	Reserve(s)
Defensive end	97 Joey Bosa, LA Chargers; 95 Myles Garrett, Cleveland	55 Frank Clark, Kansas City
Defensive tackle	97 Cameron Heyward, Pittsburgh; 95 Chris Jones, Kansas City	93 Calais Campbell, Baltimore
Outside linebacker	55 Bradley Chubb, Denver; 90 T. J. Watt, Pittsburgh	99 Matthew Judon, Baltimore
Inside linebacker	53 Darius Leonard, Indianapolis	49 Tremaine Edmunds, Buffalo
Cornerback	25 Xavien Howard, Miami; 27 Tre'Davious White, Buffalo	24 Stephon Gilmore, New England; 44 Marlon Humphrey, Baltimore
Free safety	39 Minkah Fitzpatrick, Pittsburgh	31 Justin Simmons, Denver
Strong safety	32 Tyrann Mathieu, Kansas City	

=== Special teams ===
Position	Starter(s)
Punter	7 Jake Bailey, New England
Placekicker	9 Justin Tucker, Baltimore
Return specialist	18 Andre Roberts, Buffalo
Special teams	18 Matthew Slater, New England
Long snapper	46 Morgan Cox, Baltimore

== NFC roster ==
=== Offense ===
Position(s)	Starter(s)	Reserve(s)
Quarterback	12 Aaron Rodgers, Green Bay	3 Russell Wilson, Seattle; 1 Kyler Murray, Arizona
Running back	33 Dalvin Cook, Minnesota	41 Alvin Kamara, New Orleans; 33 Aaron Jones, Green Bay
Fullback	44 Kyle Juszczyk, San Francisco	
Wide receiver	17 Davante Adams, Green Bay; 10 DeAndre Hopkins, Arizona	14 DK Metcalf, Seattle; 18 Justin Jefferson, Minnesota
Tight end	88 T. J. Hockenson, Detroit	88 Evan Engram, NY Giants
Offensive tackle	69 David Bakhtiari, Green Bay; 71 Trent Williams, San Francisco	72 Terron Armstead, New Orleans
Offensive guard	75 Brandon Scherff, Washington; 74 Elgton Jenkins, Green Bay	75 Andrus Peat, New Orleans
Center	62 Jason Kelce, Philadelphia	77 Frank Ragnow, Detroit

=== Defense ===
Position	Starter(s)	Reserve(s)
Defensive end	94 Cameron Jordan, New Orleans; 55 Brandon Graham, Philadelphia	99 Chase Young, Washington
Defensive tackle	99 Aaron Donald, LA Rams; 91 Fletcher Cox, Philadelphia	97 Grady Jarrett, Atlanta
Outside linebacker	55 Za'Darius Smith, Green Bay; 52 Khalil Mack, Chicago	90 Jason Pierre-Paul, Tampa Bay
Inside linebacker	54 Bobby Wagner, Seattle	54 Fred Warner, San Francisco
Cornerback	20 Jalen Ramsey, LA Rams; 23 Jaire Alexander, Green Bay	23 Marshon Lattimore, New Orleans; 24 James Bradberry, NY Giants
Free safety	37 Quandre Diggs, Seattle	33 Jamal Adams, Seattle
Strong safety	32 Budda Baker, Arizona	

=== Special teams ===
Position	Starter(s)
Punter	3 Jack Fox, Detroit
Placekicker	7 Younghoe Koo, Atlanta
Return specialist	84 Cordarrelle Patterson, Chicago
Special teams	44 Nick Bellore, Seattle
Long snapper	69 Tyler Ott, Seattle

== Number of selections per team ==
American Football Conference
Team	Selections
Baltimore Ravens	7
Buffalo Bills	5
Cincinnati Bengals	0
Cleveland Browns	3
Denver Broncos	2
Houston Texans	2
Indianapolis Colts	3
Jacksonville Jaguars	0
Kansas City Chiefs	7
Los Angeles Chargers	2
Las Vegas Raiders	2
Miami Dolphins	1
New England Patriots	3
New York Jets	0
Pittsburgh Steelers	5
Tennessee Titans	2

National Football Conference
Team	Selections
Arizona Cardinals	3
Atlanta Falcons	2
Carolina Panthers	0
Chicago Bears	2
Dallas Cowboys	0
Detroit Lions	3
Green Bay Packers	7
Los Angeles Rams	2
Minnesota Vikings	2
New Orleans Saints	5
New York Giants	2
Philadelphia Eagles	3
San Francisco 49ers	3
Seattle Seahawks	7
Tampa Bay Buccaneers	1
Washington Football Team	2
