= 2019 Pro Bowl =

National Football League all-star game

2019 NFL Pro Bowl
AFC	NFC
26	7
Head coach: Anthony Lynn (Los Angeles Chargers)	Head coach: Jason Garrett (Dallas Cowboys)
	1	2	3	4	Total
AFC	7	10	3	6	26
NFC	0	0	0	7	7
- Date: January 27, 2019
- Stadium: Camping World Stadium; Orlando, Florida
- Offensive MVP: Patrick Mahomes (Kansas City Chiefs)
- Defensive MVP: Jamal Adams (New York Jets)
- Referee: Pete Morelli (1st half) and Walt Coleman (2nd half)
- Attendance: 57,875

Ceremonies
- National anthem: JD McCrary

TV in the United States
- Network: ESPN; ESPN Deportes; ABC; Disney XD
- Announcers: Joe Tessitore, Jason Witten, Booger McFarland and Lisa Salters

Radio in the United States
- Network: Westwood One
- Announcers: Kevin Kugler (play-by-play); Tony Boselli (analyst); Laura Okmin (sideline reporter)

The 2019 Pro Bowl was the National Football League's all-star game for the 2018 NFL season, played on January 27, 2019, at Camping World Stadium in Orlando, Florida. It was televised nationally by ESPN and its sister networks.

== Game format ==
The 2019 game featured the same format as the previous five editions. For the sixth straight year, the Pro Bowl differed from standard NFL game rules and format in that there were no kickoffs and every quarter had a two-minute warning. Also, the play clock was only 35 seconds, and the game clock ran after pass incompletions, except with less than two minutes left in either half (or overtime, had it been necessary).

As with the previous Pro Bowl, a modified limited-contact form was used, and play was called dead as soon as a player was surrounded and likely to be tackled.

== Summary ==
=== Box score ===
2019 Pro Bowl: AFC vs NFC

Quarter	1	2	3	4	Total
AFC	7	10	3	6	26
NFC	0	0	0	7	7

at Camping World Stadium in Orlando, Florida

- Date: January 27, 2019
- Game time: 3:00 p.m. EST
- Game attendance: 57,875
- Referee: Pete Morelli (1st half) and Walt Coleman (2nd half)
- TV announcers (ESPN/ABC/Disney XD): Joe Tessitore, Jason Witten, Booger McFarland and Lisa Salters

=== Scoring summary ===
Scoring summary

Quarter	Time	Drive			Team	Scoring information	Score	
Quarter	Time	Plays	Yards	TOP	Team	Scoring information	AFC	NFC
1	11:26	7	75	3:34	AFC	Eric Ebron 18-yard touchdown reception from Patrick Mahomes, Jason Myers kick good	7	0
2	12:54	7	74	3:52	AFC	Anthony Sherman 1-yard touchdown run, Jason Myers kick good	14	0
2	0:25	17	79	7:37	AFC	31-yard field goal by Jason Myers	17	0
3	4:06	9	57	5:54	AFC	47-yard field goal by Jason Myers	20	0
4	9:05	8	63	4:26	NFC	Austin Hooper 20-yard touchdown reception from Dak Prescott, Aldrick Rosas kick good	20	7
4	0:19	6	67	3:52	AFC	Jalen Ramsey 6-yard touchdown reception from Deshaun Watson, 2-point pass incomplete	26	7
"TOP" = time of possession. For other American football terms, see Glossary of American football.							26	7

=== Game statistics ===
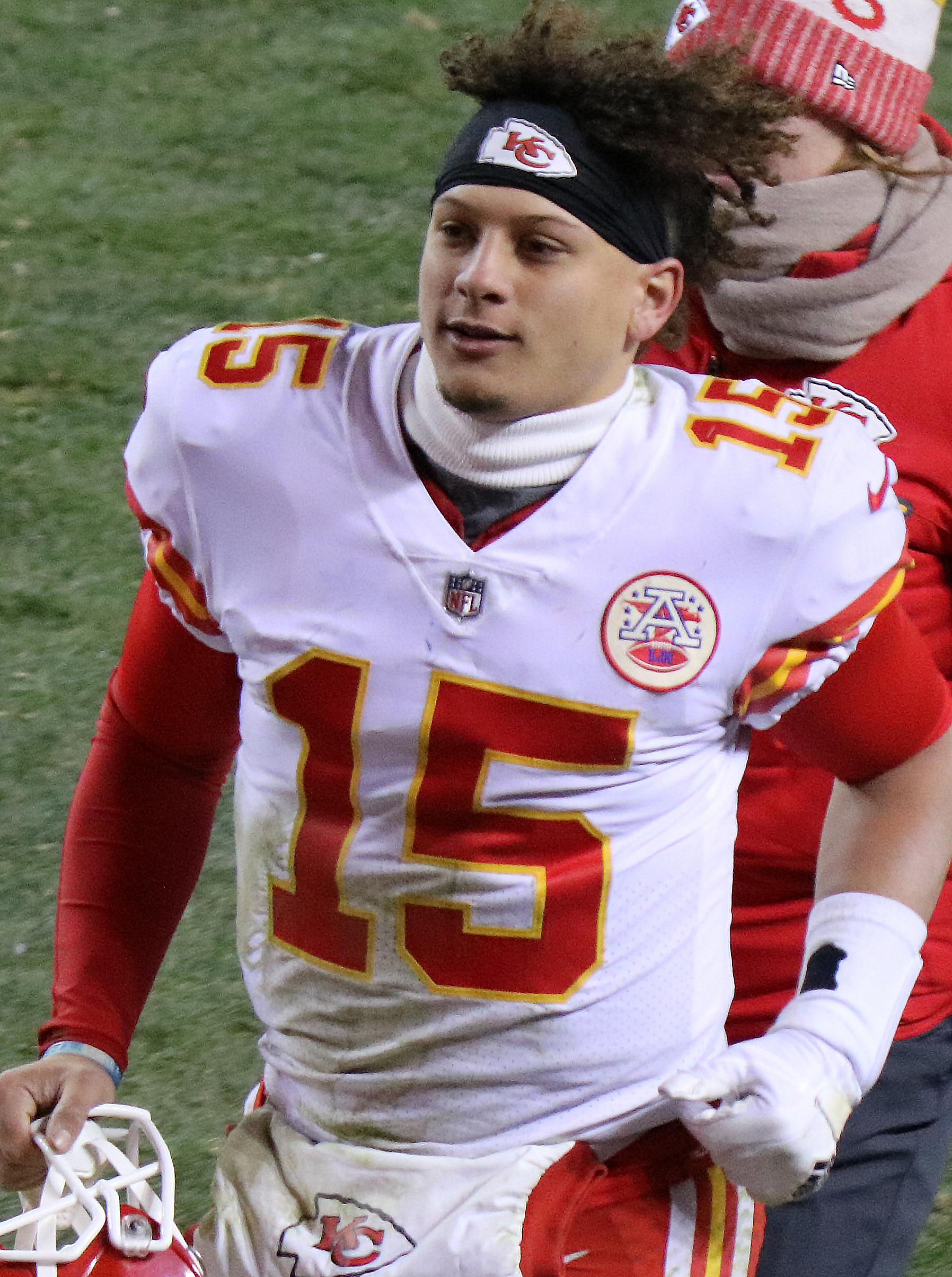
Patrick Mahomes started at quarterback for the AFC.

Statistics	AFC	NFC
First downs	24	10
Plays–yards	64–416	38–148
Rushes–yards	18–54	9–47
Passing yards	362	101
Passing: comp–att–int	29–46–2	14–29–3
Turnovers		
Time of possession	36:03	23:57

Team	Category	Player	Statistics
AFC	Passing	Patrick Mahomes	7–14, 156 yds, 1 TD
AFC	Rushing	Tyreek Hill	2 car, 24 yds
AFC	Receiving	Keenan Allen	4 rec, 95 yds
NFC	Passing	Russell Wilson	5–8, 68 yds
NFC	Rushing	Ezekiel Elliott	3 car, 33 yds
NFC	Receiving	Davante Adams	2 rec, 41 yds

== AFC Rosters ==
The following players were selected to represent the AFC:

=== Offense ===
Position	Starter(s)	Reserve(s)	Alternate(s)
Quarterback	15 Patrick Mahomes, Kansas City	17 Philip Rivers, LA Chargers^{[b]} 12 Tom Brady, New England^{[d]}	12 Andrew Luck, Indianapolis^{[a]} 4 Deshaun Watson, Houston^{[a]}
Running back	30 James Conner, Pittsburgh	28 Melvin Gordon, LA Chargers; 30 Phillip Lindsay, Denver^{[b]}	26 Lamar Miller, Houston^{[a]}
Fullback	42 Anthony Sherman, Kansas City		
Wide receiver	10 DeAndre Hopkins, Houston^{[b]} 10 Tyreek Hill, Kansas City	13 Keenan Allen, LA Chargers; 84 Antonio Brown, Pittsburgh^{[b]}	19 JuJu Smith-Schuster, Pittsburgh^{[a]} 80 Jarvis Landry, Cleveland^{[a]}
Tight end	87 Travis Kelce, Kansas City^{[b]}	85 Eric Ebron, Indianapolis	87 Jared Cook, Oakland^{[a]}
Offensive tackle	77 Taylor Lewan, Tennessee; 78 Alejandro Villanueva, Pittsburgh	72 Eric Fisher, Kansas City	
Offensive guard	66 David DeCastro, Pittsburgh^{[b]} 73 Marshal Yanda, Baltimore	56 Quenton Nelson, Indianapolis	75 Joel Bitonio, Cleveland^{[a]}
Center	53 Maurkice Pouncey, Pittsburgh	53 Mike Pouncey, LA Chargers	

=== Defense ===
Position	Starter(s)	Reserve(s)	Alternate(s)
Defensive end	99 J. J. Watt, Houston^{[b]} 95 Myles Garrett, Cleveland	54 Melvin Ingram, LA Chargers	93 Calais Campbell, Jacksonville^{[a]}
Defensive tackle	97 Geno Atkins, Cincinnati^{[b]} 99 Jurrell Casey, Tennessee^{[b]}	97 Cameron Heyward, Pittsburgh	95 Kyle Williams, Buffalo^{[a]} 98 Brandon Williams, Baltimore^{[a]}
Outside linebacker	58 Von Miller, Denver; 90 Jadeveon Clowney, Houston^{[b]}	55 Dee Ford, Kansas City	90 T. J. Watt, Pittsburgh^{[a]}
Inside linebacker	57 C. J. Mosley, Baltimore	55 Benardrick McKinney, Houston	
Cornerback	25 Xavien Howard, Miami; 20 Jalen Ramsey, Jacksonville	24 Stephon Gilmore, New England^{[d]} 21 Denzel Ward, Cleveland	25 Chris Harris Jr., Denver^{[a]}
Free safety	33 Derwin James, LA Chargers	32 Eric Weddle, Baltimore	
Strong safety	33 Jamal Adams, NY Jets		

=== Special teams ===
Position	Starter(s)	Alternate(s)
Punter	6 Brett Kern, Tennessee	
Placekicker	2 Jason Myers, NY Jets	
Return specialist	19 Andre Roberts, NY Jets	
Special teams	31 Adrian Phillips, LA Chargers	
Long snapper	42 Casey Kreiter, Denver	

Notes: Players must have accepted their invitations as alternates to be listed; those who declined are not considered Pro Bowlers.

bold player who participated in game
(C) signifies the player has been selected as a captain
^{a} Replacement player selection due to injury or vacancy
^{b} Injured/suspended player; selected but did not participate
^{c} Replacement starter; selected as reserve
^{d} Selected but did not play because his team advanced to Super Bowl LIII (see Pro Bowl "Player Selection" section)
^{e} Selected but chose not to participate

== NFC rosters ==
The following players were selected to represent the NFC:

=== Offense ===
Position	Starter(s)	Reserve(s)	Alternate(s)
Quarterback	9 Drew Brees, New Orleans^{[b]}	16 Jared Goff, LA Rams^{[d]} 12 Aaron Rodgers, Green Bay^{[b]}	3 Russell Wilson, Seattle^{[a]} 10 Mitchell Trubisky, Chicago^{[a]} 4 Dak Prescott, Dallas^{[a]}
Running back	30 Todd Gurley, LA Rams^{[d]}	26 Saquon Barkley, NY Giants; 21 Ezekiel Elliott, Dallas	41 Alvin Kamara, New Orleans^{[a]}
Fullback	44 Kyle Juszczyk, San Francisco		
Wide receiver	13 Michael Thomas, New Orleans^{[b]} 11 Julio Jones, Atlanta^{[b]}	17 Davante Adams, Green Bay; 19 Adam Thielen, Minnesota	13 Mike Evans, Tampa Bay^{[a]} 19 Amari Cooper, Dallas^{[a]}
Tight end	86 Zach Ertz, Philadelphia^{[b]}	85 George Kittle, San Francisco	81 Austin Hooper, Atlanta^{[a]}
Offensive tackle	72 Terron Armstead, New Orleans^{[b]} 77 Tyron Smith, Dallas^{[b]}	71 Trent Williams, Washington^{[b]}	65 Lane Johnson, Philadelphia^{[a]} 72 Charles Leno, Chicago^{[a]} 70 Jake Matthews, Atlanta^{[a]}
Offensive Guard	79 Brandon Brooks, Philadelphia^{[b]} 70 Zack Martin, Dallas^{[b]}	70 Trai Turner, Carolina	75 Andrus Peat, New Orleans^{[a]} 67 Larry Warford, New Orleans^{[a]}
Center	51 Alex Mack, Atlanta	60 Max Unger, New Orleans^{[b]}	65 Cody Whitehair, Chicago^{[a]}

=== Defense ===
Position	Starter(s)	Reserve(s)	Alternate(s)
Defensive end	94 Cameron Jordan, New Orleans; 90 DeMarcus Lawrence, Dallas	99 Danielle Hunter, Minnesota	
Defensive tackle	99 Aaron Donald, LA Rams^{[d]} 91 Fletcher Cox, Philadelphia^{[b]}	96 Akiem Hicks, Chicago	99 DeForest Buckner, San Francisco^{[a]} 99 Kawann Short, Carolina^{[a]}
Outside linebacker	52 Khalil Mack, Chicago^{[b]} 91 Ryan Kerrigan, Washington	55 Anthony Barr, Minnesota	54 Olivier Vernon, NY Giants^{[a]}
Inside linebacker	59 Luke Kuechly, Carolina^{[b]}	54 Bobby Wagner, Seattle	55 Leighton Vander Esch, Dallas^{[a]}
Cornerback	23 Kyle Fuller, Chicago; 21 Patrick Peterson, Arizona	23 Darius Slay, Detroit; 31 Byron Jones, Dallas	
Free safety	39 Eddie Jackson, Chicago	22 Harrison Smith, Minnesota	
Strong safety	21 Landon Collins, NY Giants^{[b]}		27 Malcolm Jenkins, Philadelphia^{[a]}

=== Special teams ===
Position	Starter(s)	Alternate(s)
Punter	4 Michael Dickson, Seattle	
Placekicker	2 Aldrick Rosas, NY Giants	
Return specialist	29 Tarik Cohen, Chicago	
Special teams	58 Cory Littleton, LA Rams^{[d]}	31 Michael Thomas, NY Giants^{[a]}
Long snapper	48 Don Muhlbach, Detroit	

Notes: Players must have accepted their invitations as alternates to be listed; those who declined are not considered Pro Bowlers.

bold player who participated in game
(C) signifies the player has been selected as a captain
^{a} Replacement Player selection due to injury or vacancy
^{b} Injured/suspended player; selected but did not participate
^{c} Replacement starter; selected as reserve
^{d} Selected but did not play because his team advanced to Super Bowl LIII (see Pro Bowl "Player Selection" section)

== Number of selections per team ==
American Football Conference
Team	Selections
Baltimore Ravens	4
Buffalo Bills	1
Cincinnati Bengals	1
Cleveland Browns	4
Denver Broncos	4
Houston Texans	6
Indianapolis Colts	3
Jacksonville Jaguars	2
Kansas City Chiefs	6
Los Angeles Chargers	7
Miami Dolphins	1
New England Patriots	2
New York Jets	3
Oakland Raiders	1
Pittsburgh Steelers	8
Tennessee Titans	3

National Football Conference
Team	Selections
Arizona Cardinals	1
Atlanta Falcons	5
Carolina Panthers	3
Chicago Bears	8
Dallas Cowboys	8
Detroit Lions	2
Green Bay Packers	2
Los Angeles Rams	4
Minnesota Vikings	4
New Orleans Saints	8
New York Giants	5
Philadelphia Eagles	5
San Francisco 49ers	3
Seattle Seahawks	3
Tampa Bay Buccaneers	1
Washington Redskins	2

== Background ==
=== Host selection process ===
This was the last year of a three-year deal that began in 2017 that the Pro Bowl will be held at Camping World Stadium in Orlando, Florida.

== Broadcasting ==
The game was televised nationally by ESPN, and simulcasted by ABC and Disney XD, and broadcast via radio by Westwood One. The game was carried in Spanish by ESPN Deportes. In contrast to the network's "megacast" approach to other multi-network games, all three English-language TV channels carried the same feed. It was the first time the NFL Pro Bowl was aired on a cable network that targets children: Disney XD.
