= Jamal Adams =

American football player (born 1995)

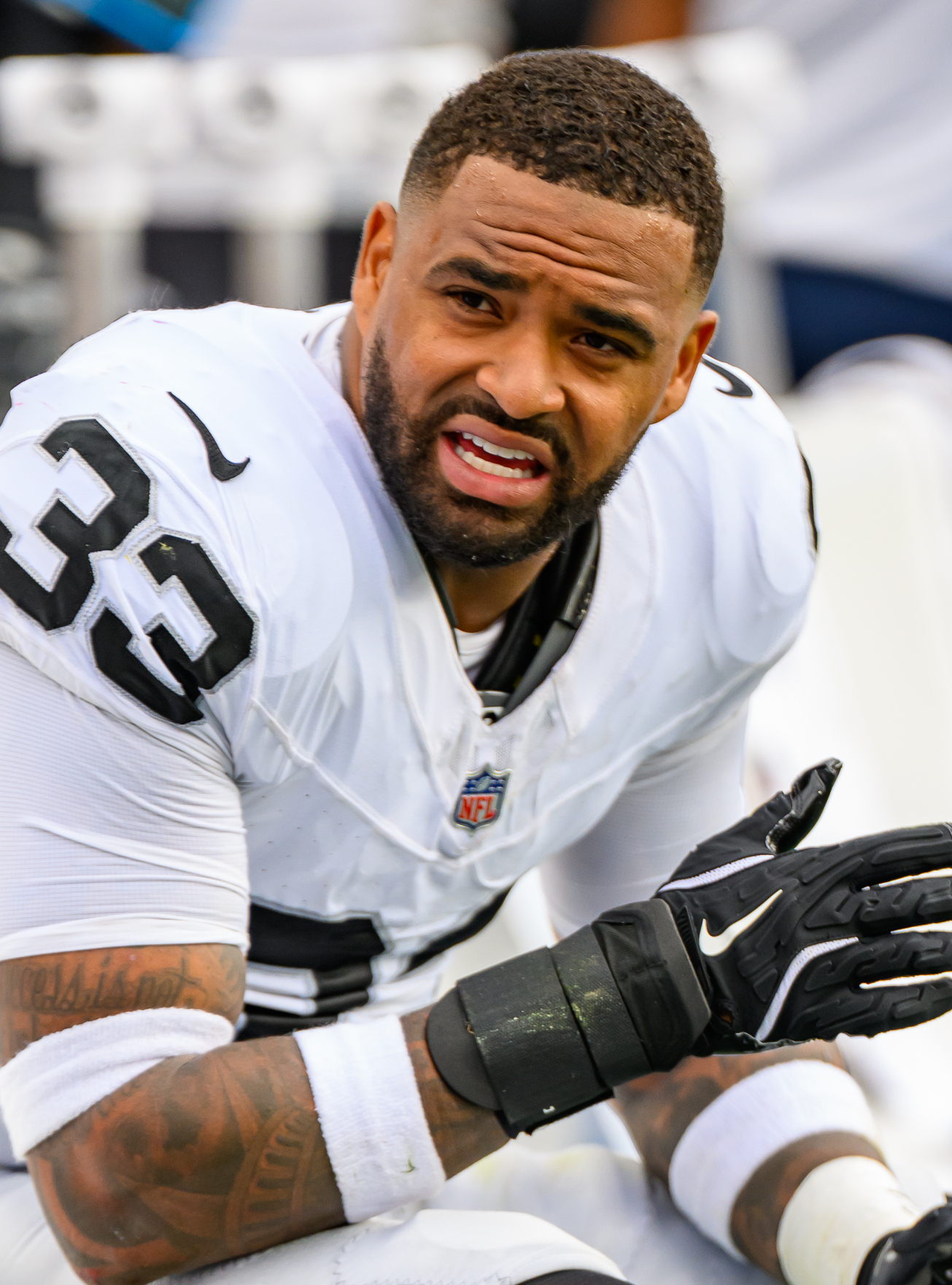
- Adams with the Las Vegas Raiders in 2025

Minnesota Vikings
- Position: Linebacker
- Roster status: Injured reserve

Personal information
- Born: October 17, 1995 (age 31); Lewisville, Texas, U.S.
- Listed height: 6 ft 1 in (1.85 m)
- Listed weight: 213 lb (97 kg)

Career information
- High school: Hebron (Carrollton, Texas)
- College: LSU (2014–2016)
- NFL draft: 2017: 1st round, 6th overall pick

Career history
- New York Jets (2017–2019); Seattle Seahawks (2020–2023); Tennessee Titans (2024); Detroit Lions (2024); Las Vegas Raiders (2025); Minnesota Vikings (2026–present)

Awards and highlights
- First-team All-Pro (2019); 2× Second-team All-Pro (2018, 2020); 3× Pro Bowl (2018–2020); PFWA All-Rookie Team (2017); First-team All-American (2016); First-team All-SEC (2016); Second-team All-SEC (2015); Freshman All-American (2014); Freshman All-SEC Team (2014)

Career NFL statistics as of 2025
- Total tackles: 546
- Sacks: 22.5
- Forced fumbles: 8
- Fumble recoveries: 4
- Pass deflections: 36
- Interceptions: 4
- Defensive touchdowns: 2
- Stats at Pro Football Reference

Jamal Lee Adams (born October 17, 1995) is an American professional football linebacker for the Minnesota Vikings of the National Football League (NFL). He played college football for the LSU Tigers, and was selected by the New York Jets sixth overall in the 2017 NFL draft. Starting his career as a safety, Adams quickly became an impactful starter for the Jets, making the Pro Bowl twice and being named an All-Pro. In 2021, Adams signed a four-year extension with the Seattle Seahawks valued at $72 million, with a $20 million signing bonus and $38 million guaranteed, making him the highest paid safety in the NFL at that time. Adams has also played for the Tennessee Titans, the Detroit Lions, and the Las Vegas Raiders.

== Early life ==
Adams attended Hebron High School in Carrollton, Texas. While there, he played high school football. During his final two years, he had 138 tackles and seven interceptions on defense and 20 touchdowns on offense. In his senior year, Hebron finished 8–4 on the season, advancing to the UIL 5A Division II Area final at AT&T Stadium, where they lost 42–21 to Cedar Hill.

Adams was rated by Scout.com as a five-star recruit and among the top 10 recruits in his class. He committed to Louisiana State University (LSU) to play college football.

== College career ==
Adams played in all 13 games with two starts as a true freshman at LSU in 2014 and had 66 tackles and a sack. As a sophomore, he was a second-team All-Southeastern Conference selection as a safety by the Associated Press (AP) and SEC coaches. As a junior, Adams was named to the AP All-SEC first-team.

On January 6, 2017, Adams announced that he would forgo his senior season and enter the 2017 NFL draft.

== Professional career ==
=== Pre-draft ===
Coming out of college, Adams was invited to the NFL Combine and performed all the available drills. On May 4, 2017, Adams attended LSU's pro day and opted to run the 40-yard dash (4.33s) and was able to improve on his combine numbers significantly. He was projected to be a first-round pick by the majority of analysts and scouts. Sports Illustrated, DraftScout.com, Pro Football Focus, and ESPN ranked Adams the top safety in the draft.

External videos
- Jamal Adams' NFL Combine workout
- Jamal Adams' 40-yard dash
- Adams' 40-yard dash at LSU Pro Day

Pre-draft measurables
Height	Weight	Arm length	Hand span	Wingspan	40-yard dash	10-yard split	20-yard split	20-yard shuttle	Three-cone drill	Vertical jump	Broad jump	Bench press	Wonderlic
5 ft 11 3/4 in (1.82 m)	214 lb (97 kg)	33 3/8 in (0.85 m)	9 1/4 in (0.23 m)	6 ft 3 1/2 in (1.92 m)	4.40 s	1.58 s	2.57 s	4.13 s	6.96 s	31.5 in (0.80 m)	10 ft 0 in (3.05 m)	18 reps	11
All values from 2017 NFL Combine/Pro Day

External videos
- Jets select Jamal Adams sixth overall
- Jamal Adams draft profile

=== New York Jets ===
==== 2017 ====
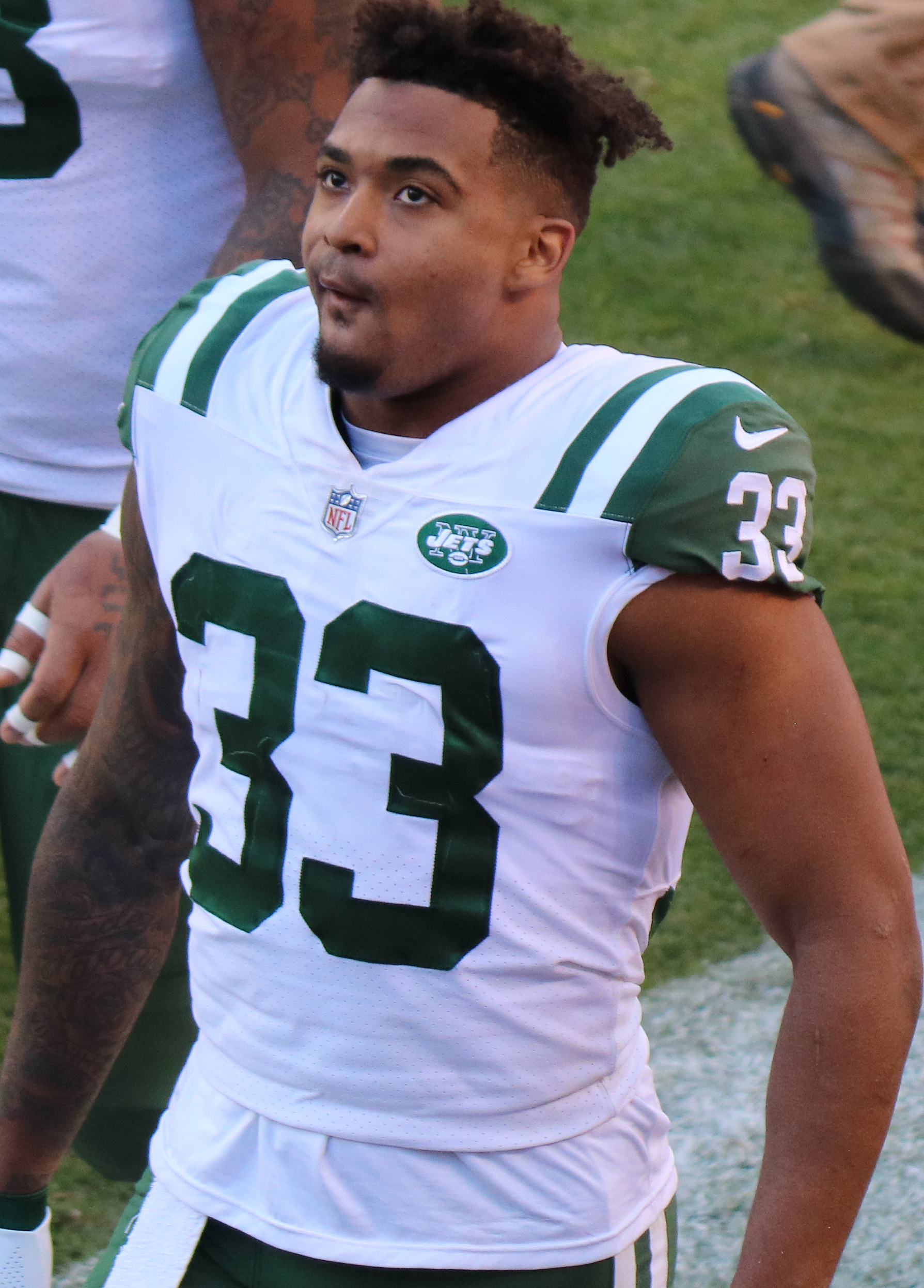
Adams in a game against the Denver Broncos

The New York Jets selected Adams in the first round (sixth overall) of the 2017 NFL draft. He was the first of two safeties drafted by the Jets, along with Marcus Maye (39th overall). He was the first safety selected in 2017.

On July 20, 2017, the Jets signed Adams to a fully guaranteed four-year, $22.25 million contract that included a $14.32 million signing bonus.

Adams entered training camp competing against Calvin Pryor and fellow rookie Marcus Maye for a role as a starting safety. Head coach Todd Bowles named Adams the starting strong safety to begin the regular season, alongside free safety Maye.

Adams made his professional regular season debut and first career start in the Jets season-opener versus the Buffalo Bills and recorded five combined tackles and deflected a pass in a 21–12 loss. Adams made his first career tackle on running back Mike Tolbert after his 13-yard run on the Bills' first drive. On September 24, Adams recorded two solo tackles, broke up a pass, and made his first career sack on quarterback Jay Cutler during a 20–6 win against the Miami Dolphins. In Week 17, he collected a season-high 10 combined tackles (three solo) and a pass deflection in the Jets' 26–6 loss to the New England Patriots. Adams finished his rookie season in 2017 with 83 combined tackles (63 solo), six pass deflections, and two sacks in 16 games and 16 starts. He was named to the PFWA All-Rookie Team.

==== 2018 ====
Adams was named a captain on the Jets' roster for the 2018 season. He got his first career interception off of Matt Cassel at the Jets' season opener versus the Detroit Lions. The Jets ultimately won the game 48–17. Adams finished his second season with 115 tackles, 3.5 sacks, three forced fumbles with one recovered fumble, and one interception and started all 16 games.

On December 18, Adams was named a Pro Bowl selection for the first time in his career. Adams was named Defensive MVP of the game. Adams became notorious after an incident where he tackled the Patriots mascot at a 2019 Pro Bowl practice. This was due to the fierce rivalry of the Jets and Patriots. Adams apologized and let the Patriots mascot tackle him back.

Adams was also named Second-team AP All-Pro during this season. On December 28, Adams was named Curtis Martin Team MVP.

==== 2019 ====
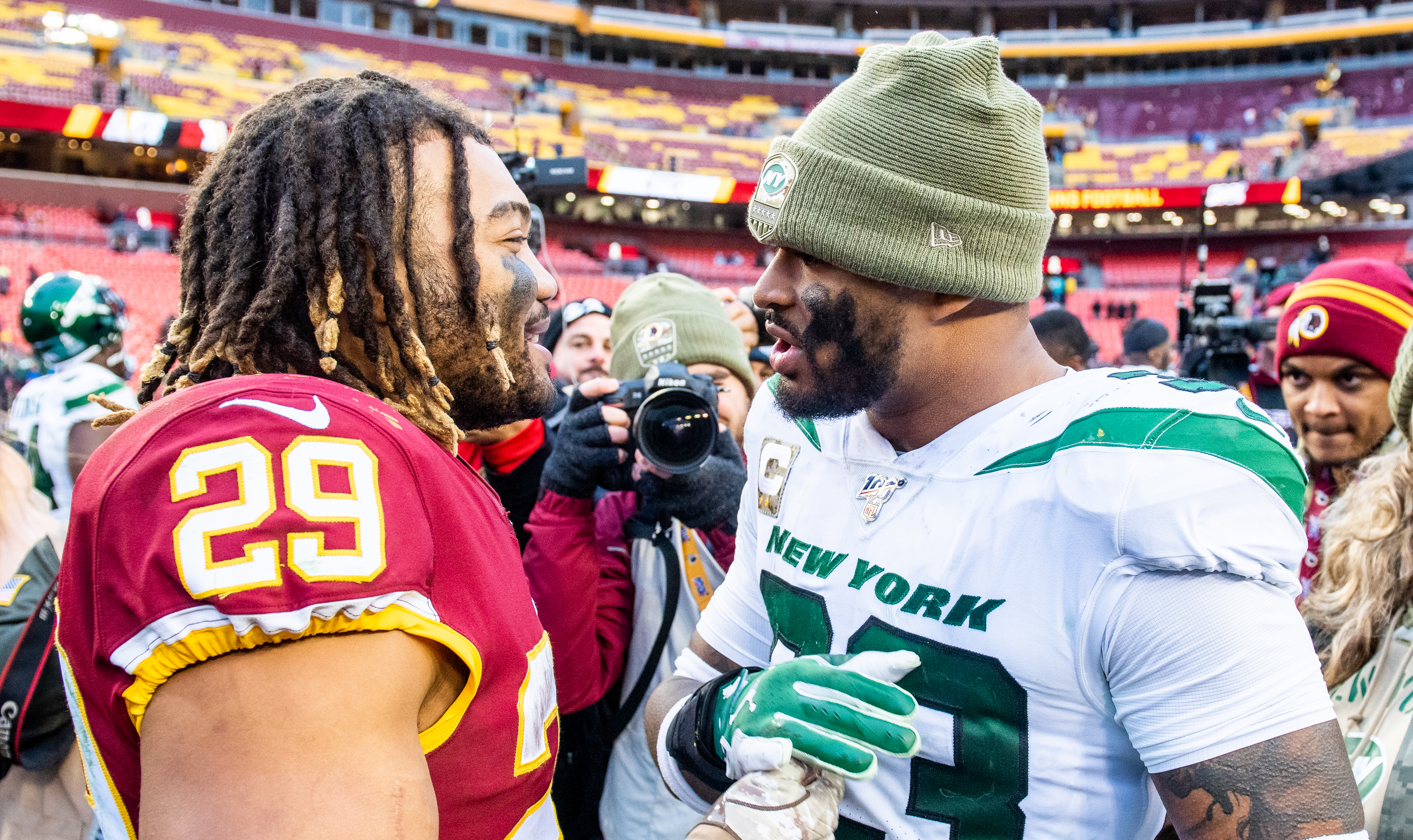
Adams alongside Derrius Guice in a game against the Washington Redskins

Before the 2019 season, Adams was ranked 37th among his fellow players on the NFL Top 100 2019 list.

On September 18, 2019, Adams was fined $21,000 for a hit he made on Baker Mayfield on Monday Night Football against the Cleveland Browns in Week 3. In Week 3 versus the Patriots, Adams recorded a 61-yard pick six off rookie quarterback Jarrett Stidham in the 30–14 loss. This was Adams' first interception of the season and his first career pick six. On October 10, Adams had his previous fine rescinded after winning an appeal.

During the NFL trade deadline, Adams voiced his displeasure regarding his name coming up in trade talks. He stated that the Los Angeles Rams would never trade Aaron Donald and the Patriots would never trade Tom Brady. Adams also said that when he found out that he was close to being traded, he would have loved to play for the Dallas Cowboys because he was from Dallas and because of his close relationship to former Cowboys' wide receiver Michael Irvin. In the end, Adams revealed that although he was hurt to be involved in trade talks, he was still excited to play for the Jets.

In Week 10 against the New York Giants, Adams recorded a team-high nine tackles and sacked Daniel Jones twice, one of which was a strip sack that he forced and returned for a 25-yard touchdown, as the Jets won 34–27 win. He was named the AFC Defensive Player of the Week for his performance. During Week 11 versus the Washington Redskins, Adams finished with a career high three sacks as the Jets won 34–17. During a game versus the Cincinnati Bengals, Adams suffered an ankle injury at the start of the game. He played the entire game and had to miss the next two weeks due to this injury. He came back from his injury in Week 16 against the Pittsburgh Steelers in the Jets' 16–10 win. At the end of the season, he was named to his second consecutive Pro Bowl and was honored with his first career First-team AP selection. Adams also earned the Curtis Martin Team MVP for the second straight year.

On April 17, 2020, it was reported that Adams would skip the entirety of the voluntary virtual offseason program without a contract extension. On April 27, 2020, the Jets picked up the fifth-year option on Adams' contract. On June 12, 2020, Adams replied to an Instagram post stating that the Jets were "A lot of talk no action" regarding his desire for a contract extension. On June 18, 2020, Adams officially requested to be traded from the Jets. Adams created a list of teams, including his hometown Cowboys, that he would welcome to be traded to. The following week, Jets' head coach Adam Gase and defensive coordinator Gregg Williams expressed that they wanted to keep Adams. Adams was interviewed by the New York Daily News in July 2020, and he made critical remarks towards his head coach Adam Gase, saying that he was not the right leader for the Jets moving forward and that he did not build good relationships with people in the building. Adams also voiced his displeasure with how general manager Joe Douglas treated him during talks of a potential contract extension. He was ranked 27th by his fellow players on the NFL Top 100 Players of 2020.

=== Seattle Seahawks ===
==== 2020 ====
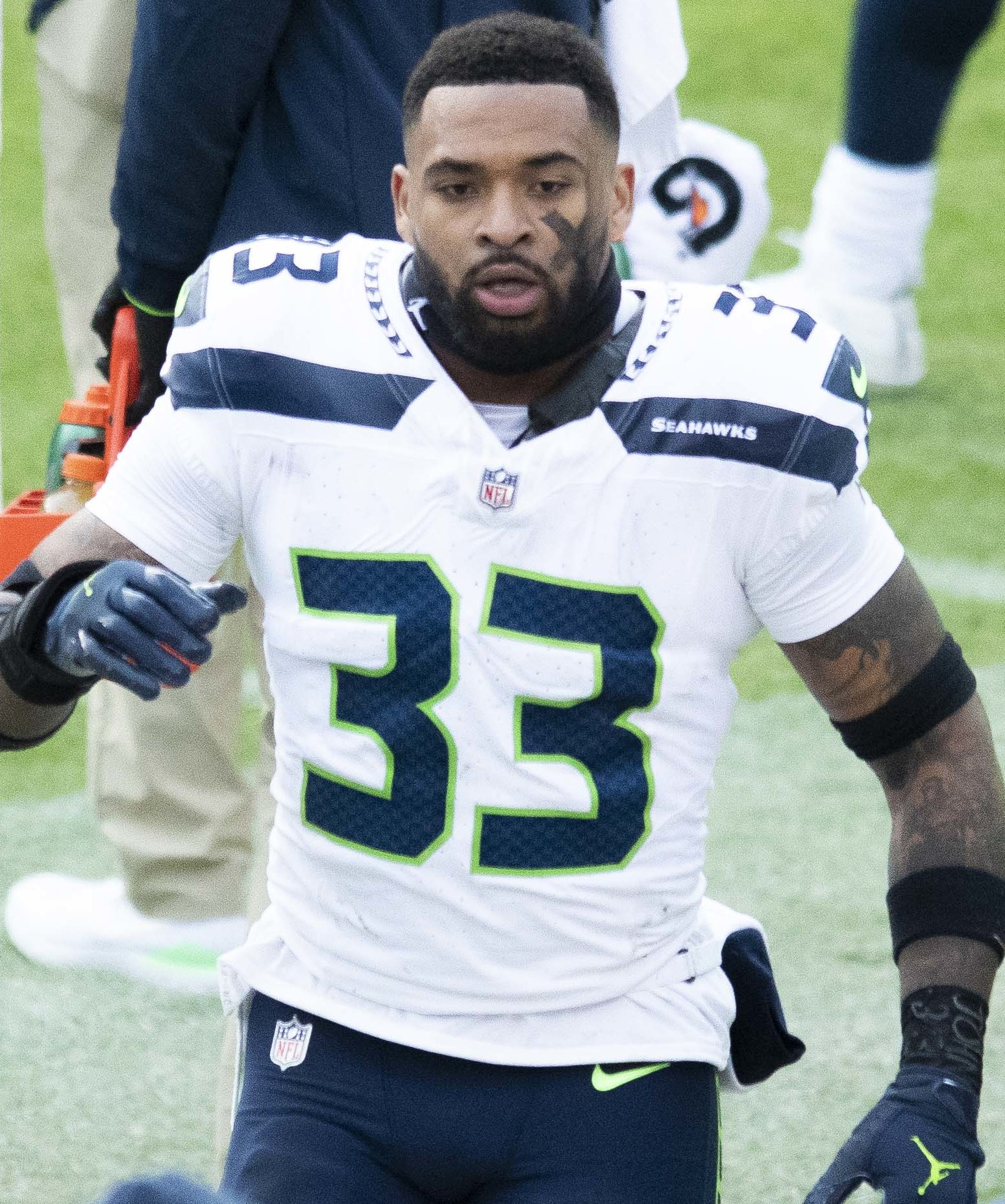
Adams in 2020

On July 25, 2020, Adams, along with a fourth-round pick in the 2022 NFL draft, was traded to the Seattle Seahawks in exchange for safety Bradley McDougald, first- and third-round picks in the 2021 NFL draft, and a first-round selection (later used to select Garrett Wilson) in the 2022 NFL draft.

Adams made his debut with the Seahawks in Week 1 against the Atlanta Falcons. During the game, Adams led the Seahawks with 12 tackles (8 solo) and recorded his first sack of the season on Matt Ryan in the 38–25 win. In the following week's game against the Patriots on Sunday Night Football, Adams recorded nine tackles and sacked Cam Newton once during the 35–30 win.

In Week 3 against the Cowboys, Adams suffered a groin injury and did not return. Adams came back from injury in Week 9 against the Bills. During the game, Adams recorded 1.5 sacks on Josh Allen during the 44–34 loss. In the following week's game against the Rams, Adams recorded two sacks on Jared Goff, including a strip sack that was recovered by the Seahawks, during the 23–16 loss.

In Week 12 against the Philadelphia Eagles on Monday Night Football, Adams led the team with nine tackles and recorded one sack on Carson Wentz during the 23–17 win.

In Week 14 against his former team, the Jets, Adams recorded a sack on former teammate Sam Darnold during the 40–3 win. This was Adams' 8.5th sack on the season, breaking the NFL record for most sacks in a season by a defensive back. Against the Washington Football Team, Adams expanded his hold on the record with another sack, bringing his season total to 9.5 sacks.

Adams was named to his third straight Pro Bowl on December 21, 2020. Adams and teammate Quandre Diggs became the first safety tandem to make the Pro Bowl together since former Seahawks safeties Earl Thomas and Kam Chancellor in 2015.

==== 2021 ====
On August 17, 2021, Adams signed a four-year deal with the Seahawks. Adams' deal consists of a top value of $72 million, with a $20 million signing bonus and $38 million guaranteed, making him the highest paid safety in NFL history at the time. Against the Green Bay Packers on November 14, 2021, Adams recorded his first interception of the season off of Aaron Rodgers in a 17–0 loss. Adams suffered a torn labrum during the Seahawks Week 13 win over the San Francisco 49ers, and was placed on injured reserve on December 10, 2021.

==== 2022 ====
During the Seahawks Week 1 win against the Denver Broncos, Adams suffered a torn quad tendon in the second quarter that ended his season. He was placed on injured reserve on September 15, 2022.

==== 2023 ====
In the 2023 season, Adams played in and started nine games. He finished with 48 total tackles (34 solo) and two passes defended.

On March 5, 2024, Adams was released by the Seahawks.

=== Tennessee Titans ===
On July 11, 2024, Adams signed a one-year contract with the Tennessee Titans. He missed the season opener due to a hip injury; after playing 20 snaps in 3 games, the Titans placed Adams on the reserve/non-football injury list on October 12. Adams subsequently requested to be released from the Titans, and the team granted his request on October 17, 2024.

=== Detroit Lions ===
On December 1, 2024, Adams was signed to the Detroit Lions practice squad. Adams would play in two games for the Lions, in which he recorded three tackles. He was released on January 1, 2025.

=== Las Vegas Raiders ===
On July 22, 2025, Adams signed with the Las Vegas Raiders. This reunited him with head coach Pete Carroll, who was his head coach during his time at Seattle. During training camp, Carroll announced that Adams would be switching positions from safety to linebacker. He played in all 17 games with four starts, recording 45 tackles, one sack, and one forced fumble.

=== Minnesota Vikings ===
On July 28, 2026, Adams signed with the Minnesota Vikings. On August 16, it was announced that Adams had suffered a season–ending torn quad tendon after being carted off the field during a preseason game against the New York Giants the day previous.

== Career statistics ==
=== NFL ===
Legend
**Bold**	Career high

==== Regular season ====
Year	Team	Games		Tackles					Interceptions						Fumbles			
Year	Team	GP	GS	Comb	Solo	Ast	Sck	TFL	PD	Int	Yds	Avg	Lng	TD	FF	FR	Yds	TD
2017	NYJ	16	16	83	63	20	2.0	9	6	0	0	0	0	0	1	**2**	5	0
2018	NYJ	16	16	**115**	**86**	29	3.5	9	**12**	1	38	38.0	38	0	**3**	1	**25**	0
2019	NYJ	14	14	75	61	14	6.5	10	7	1	**61**	**61.0**	**61**	**1**	2	1	0	**1**
2020	SEA	12	12	83	59	24	**9.5**	**11**	3	0	0	0	0	0	1	0	0	0
2021	SEA	12	12	87	56	**31**	0.0	4	5	**2**	0	0.0	0	0	0	0	0	0
2022	SEA	1	1	3	3	0	0.0	0	1	0	0	0.0	0	0	0	0	0	0
2023	SEA	9	9	48	34	14	0.0	7	2	0	0	0.0	0	0	0	0	0	0
2024	TEN	3	1	4	2	2	0.0	0	0	0	0	0.0	0	0	0	0	0	0
2024	DET	2	2	3	2	1	0.0	0	0	0	0	0.0	0	0	0	0	0	0
2025	LV	17	4	45	30	15	1.0	5	0	0	0	0.0	0	0	1	0	0	0
2026	MIN	0	0	Did not play due to injury														
Career		102	87	546	396	150	22.5	55	36	4	99	24.8	61	1	8	4	30	1

==== Postseason ====
Year	Team	Games		Tackles					Interceptions						Fumbles			
Year	Team	GP	GS	Comb	Solo	Ast	Sck	TFL	PD	Int	Yds	Avg	Lng	TD	FF	FR	Yds	TD
2020	SEA	1	1	4	2	2	0.0	0	3	0	0	0.0	0	0	0	0	0	0
2022	SEA	0	0	Did not play due to injury														
Career		1	1	4	2	2	0.0	0	3	0	0	0.0	0	0	0	0	0	0

=== College ===
Season	Team	GP	Defense				
Season	Team	GP	Tckl	TfL	Sck	Int	FF
2014	LSU	12	66	5.0	1.0	0	0
2015	LSU	12	67	5.5	0.0	4	1
2016	LSU	12	76	7.5	1.0	1	1
Career		36	209	18.0	2.0	5	2

== Career highlights ==
NFL

- First-team All-Pro (2019)
- 2× Second-team All-Pro (2018, 2020)
- 3× Pro Bowl (2018–2020)
- Pro Bowl Defensive MVP (2018)
- PFWA All-Rookie Team (2017)
- 3× NFL Top 100: 37th (2019), 27th (2020), 31st (2021)
- NFL record most sacks by a defensive back in a season: 9.5 (2020)

College

- First-team All-American (2016)
- First-team All-SEC (2016)
- Second-team All-SEC (2015)
- Freshman All-American (2014)
- Freshman All-SEC Team (2014)

== Personal life ==
Adams is the son of Michelle and George Adams. His father, George, played in the National Football League (NFL) from 1985 to 1991 as a running back. Adams is a pescatarian.
