= NFL Top 100 Players of 2020 =

Season of television series

- Season 2020
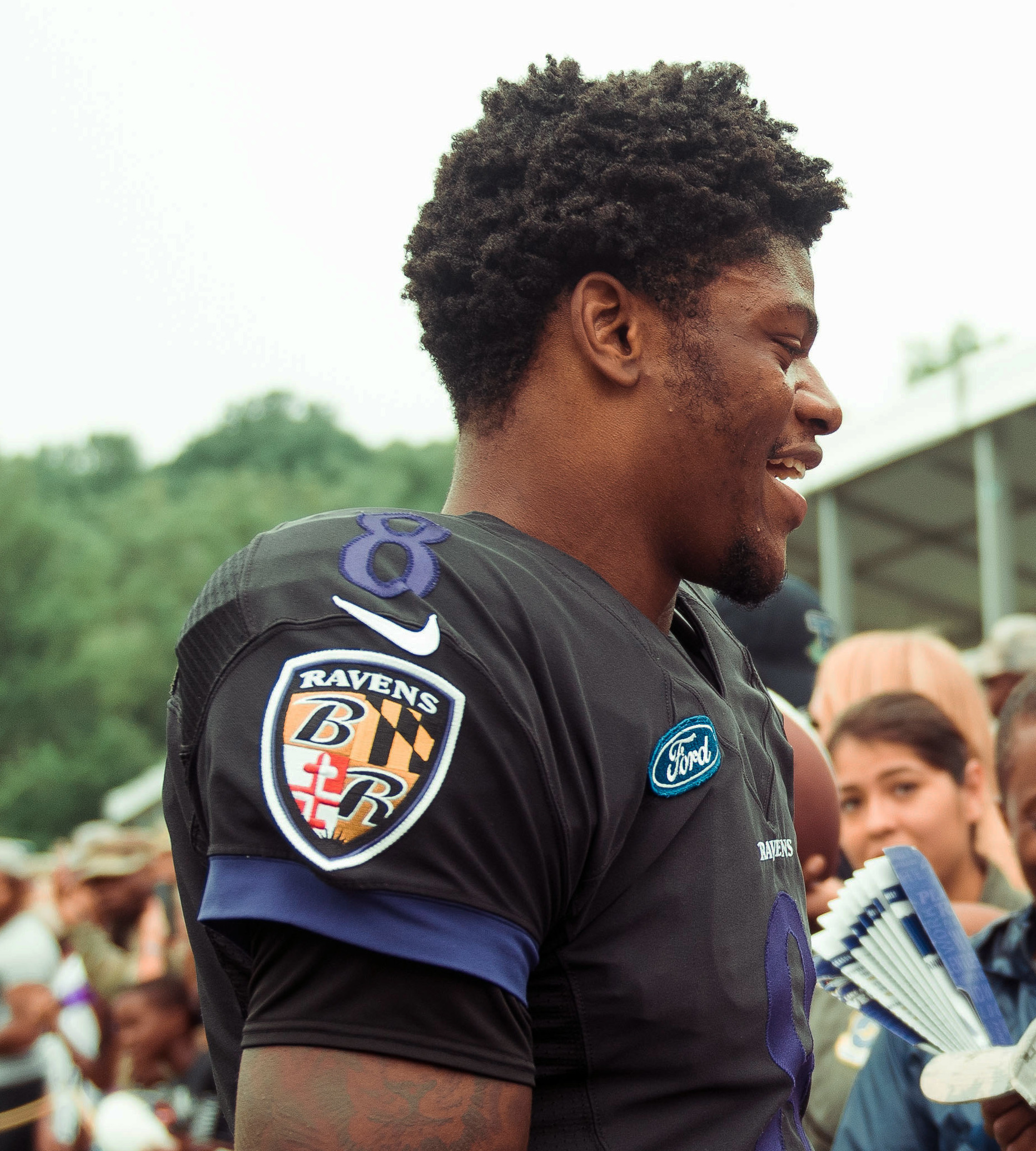
- Lamar Jackson, the #1 ranked player

Release
- Original network: NFL Network
- Original release: July 26 – July 30, 2020

Season chronology
- ← Previous; 2019 Next → 2021

The NFL Top 100 Players of 2020 is the tenth season in the NFL Top 100 series. It premiered on July 26, 2020 and the final episode aired on July 29, 2020. It started later than in previous years, and the show was shown in four consecutive days instead. Baltimore Ravens quarterback and reigning NFL MVP Lamar Jackson was voted number 1. The New Orleans Saints had the most selections withseven, while the Cincinnati Bengals, Miami Dolphins, New York Jets, Jacksonville Jaguars, Detroit Lions, and Washington Football Team had no selections. Atlanta Falcons running back Todd Gurley had the biggest drop, dropping 46 spots. Tennessee Titans running back Derrick Henry had the biggest increase in position jumping 89 spots. Tampa Bay Buccaneers wide receiver Antonio Brown, who was a free agent at the time the countdown aired, was the highest ranking player from the 2019 countdown, ranked 7th in 2019, to not be ranked in 2020.

== Episode list ==
Episode No.	Air date	Numbers revealed
1	July 26	100–91
2	July 26	90–81
3	July 26	80–71
4	July 27	70–61
5	July 27	60–51
6	July 27	50–41
7	July 28	40–31
8	July 28	30–21
9	July 28	20–11
10	July 29	10–6
11	July 29	5–1
	July 29	110–101

== The list ==
Rank	Player	Position	2019 team	2020 team	Rank change	Reference	Year accomplishments
1	Lamar Jackson	Quarterback	Baltimore Ravens		NR		AP MVP; 1st Pro Bowl selection; 1st First-team All-Pro selection; NFL passing touchdowns leader (36); Most rushing yards in a season by a quarterback (1,206); Most rushing attempts by a quarterback in a season: 159; Most perfect passer ratings in a season (tied with Ben Roethlisberger): 2
2	Russell Wilson	Quarterback	Seattle Seahawks		▲23		7th Pro Bowl selection; 1st Second-team All-Pro selection; 2nd consecutive season of having of a passer rating of 106+; 3rd consecutive season of 30+ passing touchdowns; Most 4th quarter comebacks in the league (4, tied with Jimmy Garoppolo and Josh Allen); Most game winning drives in the league (5, tied with Josh Allen)
3	Aaron Donald	Defensive tackle	Los Angeles Rams		▼2		6th Pro Bowl selection; 5th First-team All-Pro selection; 3rd consecutive season of 11+ sacks, 15+ tackles for loss, 2+ forced fumbles; 2nd consecutive season leading the league in tackles for loss (20)
4	Patrick Mahomes	Quarterback	Kansas City Chiefs		0		Super Bowl LIV MVP; Super Bowl champion (1st time); 2nd Pro Bowl selection; 2nd consecutive season of 4,000+ passing yards, 65%+ pass completion percentage, 105+ passer rating
5	Michael Thomas	Wide receiver	New Orleans Saints		▲8		AP OPOY; 2nd First-team All-Pro selection; Most receptions in a season (149); Led league in receiving yards (1,725); 3rd most receiving touchdowns (9, tied)
6	Christian McCaffrey	Running back	Carolina Panthers		▲36		1st Pro Bowl selection; 1st First-team All-Pro selection; Most receptions by a running back in a season (116); 3rd most touchdowns on the season (15); Most total touchdowns on the season (19, tied with Aaron Jones); 3rd season of 1,000+ rushing yards and 1,000+ receiving yards in NFL history (joining Marshall Faulk and Roger Craig); 2nd consecutive season of 1,000+ rushing yards, 7+ rushing touchdowns, 100+ receptions, 800+ receiving yards
7	George Kittle	Tight end	San Francisco 49ers		▲22		2nd Pro Bowl selection; 1st First-team All-Pro selection; 2nd consecutive season of 85+ receptions, 1,000+ receiving yards, 5 touchdown receptions, 12+ yards per catch; Most receiving yards through first 3 seasons by a tight end (2,945)
8	DeAndre Hopkins	Wide receiver	Houston Texans	Arizona Cardinals	▲3		4th Pro Bowl selection; 3rd First-team All-Pro selection; 2nd consecutive season of 100+ receptions, 1,100+ receiving yards, 7+ touchdown receptions
9	Stephon Gilmore	Cornerback	New England Patriots		▲13		AP DPOY; 3rd Pro Bowl selection; 2nd First-team All-Pro selection; NFL interceptions co-leader (6, tied with Tre'Davious White and Anthony Harris); League leader in pass deflections (20); 2nd consecutive season of 20 pass deflections
10	Derrick Henry	Running back	Tennessee Titans		▲89		1st Pro Bowl selection; 1st Second-team All-Pro selection; NFL rushing yards leader (1,540); NFL rushing touchdowns co-leader (16, tied with Aaron Jones); Led the league with 303 rushing attempts; 2nd consecutive season of 215+ rushing attempts, 1,000+ rushing yards, 4.9+ yards per carry, 12+ rushing touchdowns
11	Julio Jones	Wide receiver	Atlanta Falcons		▼2		7th Pro Bowl selection; 3rd Second-team All-Pro selection; 2nd most receiving yards in the league (1,394, behind only |Michael Thomas); 2nd consecutive season of 99+ receptions, 1,300+ receiving yards, 6+ touchdown receptions; 6th consecutive season of 1,300+ receiving yards
12	Drew Brees	Quarterback	New Orleans Saints		▼10		13th Pro Bowl selection; NFL completion percentage leader (74.3%); 3rd consecutive season of leading the league in completion percentage; 4th consecutive season of completing 70%+ passing attempts; 5th consecutive season of 101+ passer rating; Most career touchdown passes (547 excluding playoffs as of 2019); Highest single-game completion percentage in NFL history (96.7% vs Indianapolis Colts)
13	Bobby Wagner	Linebacker	Seattle Seahawks		▲2		6th Pro Bowl selection; 5th First-team All-Pro selection; League leader in tackles (159); 4th consecutive season of 130+ tackles
14	Tom Brady	Quarterback	New England Patriots	Tampa Bay Buccaneers	▼8		2nd All-time in passing touchdowns (541, behind only Drew Brees); 3rd consecutive season of 370+ completed passes, 60%+ completion percentage, 4,000+ passing yards
15	Chandler Jones	Outside linebacker	Arizona Cardinals		NR		3rd Pro Bowl selection; 2nd First-team All-Pro selection; Led league in forced fumbles (8, tied with T. J. Watt); 2nd in the league in sacks (19, only behind Shaquil Barrett)
16	Aaron Rodgers	Quarterback	Green Bay Packers		▼8		8th Pro Bowl selection; 2nd consecutive season of 6:1 or greater touchdown to interception ratio; Lowest interception ratio in the league (0.7%)
17	Nick Bosa	Defensive end	San Francisco 49ers		NR		AP NFL Defensive Rookie of the Year; 1st Pro Bowl selection; 13 sacks, 25 quarterback hits, 16 tackles for loss, 2 forced fumbles, 2 fumble recoveries, 1 interception (including playoffs)
18	Travis Kelce	Tight end	Kansas City Chiefs		▲3		Super Bowl champion (1st time); 5th Pro Bowl selection; 2nd Second-team All-Pro selection; Most receiving yards by a tight end as well as 4th most receiving yards in the league (1,229); 1st tight end in NFL history with 4 consecutive seasons of 1,000+ receiving yards
19	Khalil Mack	Outside linebacker	Chicago Bears		▼16		5th Pro Bowl selection; 2nd consecutive season of 8+ sacks, 5+ forced fumbles
20	Deshaun Watson	Quarterback	Houston Texans		▲31		2nd Pro Bowl selection; 2nd consecutive season of 67%+ completion percentage, 98+ passer rating, 3,500+ passing yards, 25+ passing touchdowns, 400+ rushing yards, 5+ rushing touchdowns
21	Dalvin Cook	Running back	Minnesota Vikings		NR		1st Pro Bowl selection; 4th most rushing touchdowns in the league (13)
22	Tyreek Hill	Wide receiver	Kansas City Chiefs		▼3		Super Bowl champion (1st time); 4th Pro Bowl selection; Caught 9 passes for 105 yards in Super Bowl LIV
23	Cameron Jordan	Defensive end	New Orleans Saints		▲18		5th Pro Bowl selection; 2nd Second-team All-Pro selection; 3rd most sacks in the league (15.5); 3rd consecutive season with 12+ sacks; 5th consecutive season with 15+ tackles for loss
24	Ezekiel Elliott	Running back	Dallas Cowboys		▼6		3rd Pro Bowl selection; 4th most rushing yards in the league (1,357); 5th most rushing touchdowns in the league (12, tied with Todd Gurley); 2nd consecutive season with 300+ carries, 1,300+ rushing yards, 50+ receptions, 400+ receiving yards
25	T. J. Watt	Outside linebacker	Pittsburgh Steelers		▲68		2nd Pro Bowl selection; 1st First-team All-Pro selection; 1st Second-team All-Pro selection; 5th most sacks in the league (14.5); 3rd most quarterback hits (36, behind only Za'Darius Smith and Shaquil Barrett); Led the league in forced fumbles (8, tied with Chandler Jones); 2nd consecutive season of 13+ sacks, 20+ quarterback hits, 12+ tackles for loss, 6+ forced fumbles
26	Von Miller	Outside linebacker	Denver Broncos		▼16		8th Pro Bowl selection; 8 sacks, 10 tackles for loss, 20 quarterback hits
27	Jamal Adams	Safety	New York Jets	Seattle Seahawks	▲10		2nd Pro Bowl selection; 1st First-team All-Pro selection; Led Jets in tackles for loss (10, tied with Steve McLendon) and quarterback hits (13, tied with Jordan Jenkins); 2nd on Jets in sacks (6.5, behind only Jordan Jenkins); Most sacks, quarterback hits, and tackles for loss of any defensive back for the season
28	Richard Sherman	Cornerback	San Francisco 49ers		NR		5th Pro Bowl selection; 2nd Second-team All-Pro selection; 60+ tackles, 10+ pass deflections, 3 interceptions, 1 touchdown; 1 of 2 cornerbacks to concede <50% in 250+ targets.
29	Quenton Nelson	Guard	Indianapolis Colts		NR		2nd Pro Bowl selection; 2nd 1st-team All-Pro selection; 0 sacks conceded, 1 rushing touchdown overturned as FB.
30	Mike Evans	Wide receiver	Tampa Bay Buccaneers		▲23		3rd Pro Bowl selection; 6th consecutive season of 1,000+ yards receiving to begin a career (tied with Randy Moss)
31	Saquon Barkley	Running back	New York Giants		▼15		2nd consecutive season of 1,000+ rushing yards, 6+ rushing touchdowns, 4.5+ yards per carry, 50+ receptions, 400+ receiving yards, 2+ receiving touchdowns; Only running back in Giants franchise history to begin a career with consecutive seasons of 1,000+ yards rushing
32	Shaquil Barrett	Outside linebacker	Tampa Bay Buccaneers		NR		1st Pro Bowl selection; 1st Second-team All-Pro selection; NFL sacks leader (19.5); Tied with Za'Darius Smith for league lead in quarterback hits (37); 2nd in tackles for loss behind Aaron Donald (19); 1st season of 10+ sacks
33	Aaron Jones	Running back	Green Bay Packers		NR		NFL rushing touchdowns co-leader (16, tied with Derrick Henry); Most total touchdowns by a non-quarterback in the season (19, tied with Christian McCaffrey)
34	Joey Bosa	Defensive end	Los Angeles Chargers		▲22		2nd Pro Bowl selection; 9th most sacks in the league (11.5, tied); 5th most quarterback hits in the league (31)
35	Minkah Fitzpatrick	Safety	Miami Dolphins / Pittsburgh Steelers	Pittsburgh Steelers	NR		1st Pro Bowl selection; 1st First-team All-Pro selection; Most total takeaways in the league (8, 5 interceptions and 3 fumble recoveries)
36	Nick Chubb	Running back	Cleveland Browns		NR		1st Pro Bowl selection; 2nd most rushing yards in the league (1,394); 1st 1,000+ yard rushing season; 2nd consecutive season with 5+ yards per carry and 8 rushing touchdowns; 1st Browns running back since Peyton Hillis in 2010 to rush for 1,000+ yards in a season
37	Jalen Ramsey	Cornerback	Jacksonville Jaguars / Los Angeles Rams	Los Angeles Rams	▼10		3rd Pro Bowl selection; Only allowed 1 touchdown when targeted all season
38	Chris Godwin	Wide receiver	Tampa Bay Buccaneers		NR		1st Pro Bowl selection; 1st Second-team All-Pro selection; 3rd most receiving yards on the season (1,333); 1st season of 1,000+ receiving yards; 3rd most receiving touchdowns (9, tied); Most receptions of 20+ yards in the league (25)
39	Tyrann Mathieu	Safety	Kansas City Chiefs		NR		Super Bowl champion (1st time); 2nd First-team All-Pro selection; 1st Second-team All-Pro selection; Team MVP; 3rd consecutive season with 75+tackles, 1+ sacks, 2+ interceptions, 7+ pass defensed
40	Danielle Hunter	Defensive end	Minnesota Vikings		▲17		2nd Pro Bowl selection; 4th most sacks in the league (14.5, tied with T. J. Watt); 2nd consecutive season of 70+ tackles, 14.5 sacks, 15+ tackles for loss
41	Jadeveon Clowney	Defensive end	Seattle Seahawks	Tennessee Titans	▲22		3 sacks, 13 quarterback hits, 30 pressures, 4 forced fumbles, 2 fumble recoveries, 1 fumble return touchdown, 1 interception, 1 interception return touchdown
42	Alvin Kamara	Running back	New Orleans Saints		▼28		3rd Pro Bowl selection; 3rd consecutive season with 700+ yards rushing, 5+ rushing touchdowns, 81 receptions, 500+ receiving yards
43	Jimmy Garoppolo	Quarterback	San Francisco 49ers		NR		1st season starting 16 games; 2nd highest completion percentage in the league among 16 game starting quarterbacks (69.1); 5th most passing touchdowns in the league (27, tied with Drew Brees and Carson Wentz); Most 4th quarter comebacks in the league (4, tied with Josh Allen and Russell Wilson)
44	Mark Ingram II	Running back	Baltimore Ravens		▲36		3rd Pro Bowl selection; 7th most rushing touchdowns in the league (10); 3rd most total touchdowns by a non-quarterback in the season (15, 10 rushing touchdowns and 5 receiving touchdowns)
45	J. J. Watt	Defensive end	Houston Texans		▼33		
46	Dak Prescott	Quarterback	Dallas Cowboys		NR		2nd most passing yards in the season (4,902); 4th most passing touchdowns in the season (30); 4th consecutive season completing 65%+ of throws; First Cowboys player to throw for 4500+ yards and 30+ touchdowns in a season
47	Tre'Davious White	Cornerback	Buffalo Bills		NR		First Pro Bowl selection; 1st First-team All-Pro selection; NFL interceptions co-leader (6, tied with Stephon Gilmore and Anthony Harris); 0 touchdowns allowed when targeted during the season
48	Za'Darius Smith	Outside linebacker	Green Bay Packers		NR		1st Pro Bowl selection; Led NFL in total pressures (93); Led NFL in total disruptions (84); Led NFL in hurries (60); Tied with Shaquil Barrett for league lead in quarterback hits (37)
49	Amari Cooper	Wide receiver	Dallas Cowboys		▲15		4th Pro Bowl selection; 9th most receiving touchdowns (9, tied); 8th most receiving yards (1,189)
50	Shaquille Leonard	Linebacker	Indianapolis Colts		▼24		First Pro Bowl selection; First Second-team All-Pro selection; Most interceptions amongst linebackers (5, with an interception for touchdown); 2nd consecutive season with 121+ tackles, 5+ sacks, 7+ passes defensed, 2+ forced fumbles
51	Todd Gurley	Running back	Los Angeles Rams	Atlanta Falcons	▼46		First-ever Rams player to score 12+ rushing touchdowns in 3 consecutive seasons; 5th most rushing touchdowns in the season (12, tied with Ezekiel Elliott)
52	Chris Jones	Defensive tackle	Kansas City Chiefs		▼16		1st Pro Bowl selection; Super Bowl champion (1st time); 2nd most sacks among defensive tackles in the season (9, behind only Jordan Phillips)
53	Marcus Peters	Cornerback	Los Angeles Rams / Baltimore Ravens	Baltimore Ravens	NR		3rd Pro Bowl selection; 2nd Second-team All-Pro selection; 4th season with 5+ interceptions
54	Stefon Diggs	Wide receiver	Minnesota Vikings	Buffalo Bills	▲19		2nd consecutive season with 1000+ receiving yards, 60+ rushing yards
55	Zack Martin	Guard	Dallas Cowboys		▲4		6th consecutive Pro Bowl selection; 4th First-team All-Pro selection; 1 Holding penalty conceded, 4 in 4 seasons.
56	DeForest Buckner	Defensive tackle	San Francisco 49ers	Indianapolis Colts	NR		3rd Second-team All-Pro selection; 3 forced fumbles, 5 fumble recoveries, 10 sacks (including playoffs)
57	Davante Adams	Wide receiver	Green Bay Packers		▼22		2nd Pro Bowl selection; 2nd season with 997 receiving yards (2016); Most touchdowns in a 4-year span (40)
58	Kirk Cousins	Quarterback	Minnesota Vikings		▲20		2nd Pro Bowl selection; 5th consecutive season with 3600+ passing yards, 25+ touchdowns
59	Odell Beckham Jr.	Wide receiver	Cleveland Browns		▼36		2nd consecutive season with 1000+ receiving yards
60	Logan Ryan	Cornerback	Tennessee Titans	New York Giants	NR		Most tackles amongst cornerbacks (113); Career highs in tackles, sacks (4.5), passes defensed (18, 2nd overall) and forced fumbles (4)
61	Jarvis Landry	Wide receiver	Cleveland Browns		▲23		5th consecutive Pro Bowl selection; Most receptions through first 6 seasons of career (564); 6th consecutive season with 81+ receptions, 750+ yards, 4+ touchdowns
62	David Bakhtiari	Offensive tackle	Green Bay Packers		▼19		2nd Pro Bowl selection; 3rd Second-team All-Pro selection
63	Preston Smith	Outside linebacker	Green Bay Packers		NR		First 10+ sack season
64	Harrison Smith	Safety	Minnesota Vikings		▲19		5th Pro Bowl selection; 3rd consecutive season with 78+ tackles, 1+ sacks, 6+ passes defensed, 3+interceptions
65	Tyler Lockett	Wide receiver	Seattle Seahawks		▲33		1st 1000+ receiving yard season; 2nd consecutive season with 8+ receiving touchdowns
66	Laremy Tunsil	Offensive tackle	Houston Texans		NR		1st Pro Bowl selection, first Texan offensive lineman since Duane Brown (2014); 3 sacks conceded
67	Demario Davis	Linebacker	New Orleans Saints		NR		1st First-team All-Pro selection; 12 passes defensed, tied most amongst linebackers (Luke Kuechly); 3rd consecutive season with 100+ tackles, 4+ sacks
68	Ryan Tannehill	Quarterback	Tennessee Titans		NR		1st Pro Bowl selection; NFL Comeback Player of the Year (2019); 1st time as NFL passer rating leader (117.5)
69	Larry Fitzgerald	Wide receiver	Arizona Cardinals		▼9		No.2 All-time receptions leader; No. 6 All-time receiving touchdowns leader; 0 dropped catches when targeted in 2019; 16th consecutive season with 58+ receptions, 730+ yards, 4+ touchdowns
70	Fred Warner	Linebacker	San Francisco 49ers		NR		2nd consecutive season with 118+ tackles, 6+ passes defensed, 1+ forced fumble
71	Jurrell Casey	Defensive tackle	Tennessee Titans	Denver Broncos	▲21		5th consecutive Pro Bowl selection; 9th consecutive season with 52+ tackles, 3+ sacks
72	Josh Jacobs	Running back	Oakland / Las Vegas Raiders		NR		PFWA All-Rookie Team; First rookie to record 100 total yards and 2 touchdowns on debut since LaDainian Tomlinson; First ever rookie Raider to rush for 1000+ yards; 3rd most rushing yards per game (Derrick Henry, Nick Chubb)
73	Fletcher Cox	Defensive tackle	Philadelphia Eagles		▼45		5th consecutive Pro Bowl selection
74	Ronnie Stanley	Offensive tackle	Baltimore Ravens		NR		1st Pro Bowl selection; 1st First-team All-Pro selection
75	Earl Thomas	Free safety	Baltimore Ravens	Free Agent	NR		7th Pro Bowl selection
76	Marshon Lattimore	Cornerback	New Orleans Saints		NR		2nd Pro Bowl selection; 3rd consecutive season with 43+ tackles, 12 passes defensed, 1+ interception
77	Keenan Allen	Wide receiver	Los Angeles Chargers		▼39		3rd consecutive Pro Bowl selection; 3rd consecutive season with 97+ receptions, 1195+ yards, 6 touchdowns
78	Tyron Smith	Offensive tackle	Dallas Cowboys		▼26		7th consecutive Pro Bowl selection
79	Calais Campbell	Defensive end	Jacksonville Jaguars	Baltimore Ravens	▼25		5th Pro Bowl selection; 2019 Walter Payton NFL Man of the Year; 11th consecutive season with 48+ tackles, 5+ sacks, 2+ passes defensed
80	Myles Garrett	Defensive end	Cleveland Browns		▼31		2nd consecutive season with 10+ sacks and 2 forced fumbles
81	DK Metcalf	Wide receiver	Seattle Seahawks		NR		Most receiving yards by rookie in a playoff game (160 yards)
82	Ryan Ramczyk	Offensive tackle	New Orleans Saints		NR		1st First-team All-Pro selection; Conceded 20 total QB pressures (0 sacks) out of 659 passing snaps
83	Eric Kendricks	Linebacker	Minnesota Vikings		NR		1st Pro Bowl selection; 1st First-team All-Pro selection; 4th consecutive season with 108+ tackles, 6+ passes defensed
84	Cameron Heyward	Defensive tackle	Pittsburgh Steelers		▲4		3rd consecutive Pro Bowl selection; 2nd First-team All-Pro selection; 3rd consecutive season with 8+sacks, 1 forced fumble, 1 fumble recovery, 3+ passes defensed
85	Zach Ertz	Tight end	Philadelphia Eagles		▼45		3rd consecutive Pro Bowl selection; 4th consecutive season with 74+ receptions, 810+ yards and 4 touchdowns
86	Marlon Humphrey	Cornerback	Baltimore Ravens		NR		1st Pro Bowl selection; 1st First-team All-Pro selection; 2nd consecutive season with 15 passes defensed and 2+ interceptions
87	Josh Allen	Quarterback	Buffalo Bills		NR		Most rushing touchdowns amongst quarterbacks (9); 3rd most rushing yards amongst quarterbacks (510 yards, Lamar Jackson, Kyler Murray); Most fourth-quarter comebacks in the season (4, tied with Jimmy Garoppolo and Russell Wilson); Most game winning drives in the season (5, tied with Russell Wilson)
88	Jaylon Smith	Linebacker	Dallas Cowboys		▼27		2nd consecutive season with 121+tackles, 2+ sacks, 2 forced fumbles and 1 fumble recovery
89	Cooper Kupp	Wide receiver	Los Angeles Rams		NR		2nd most receiving touchdowns in the season (10); Most receiving yards in a single international game (220 yards in London)
90	Kyler Murray	Quarterback	Arizona Cardinals		NR		AP NFL Offensive Rookie of the Year; 2nd-most rushing yards amongst quarterbacks (544 yards)
91	Grady Jarrett	Defensive tackle	Atlanta Falcons		NR		1st Pro Bowl selection; 1st Second-team All-Pro selection; 3rd consecutive season with 4+sacks, 52+ combined tackles and 8+ tackles-for-losses
92	Darius Slay	Cornerback	Detroit Lions	Philadelphia Eagles	▼6		Most passes defensed since 2013 (104); 6th consecutive season with 13+ passes defensed and 2+ interceptions
93	Allen Robinson	Wide receiver	Chicago Bears		NR		First Chicago Bears player to reach 1,000 receiving yards since 2014.
94	Jason Kelce	Center	Philadelphia Eagles		▼22		3rd Pro Bowl selection; 3rd First-team All-Pro selection; Played in every offensive snap, only Eagles offensive lineman to do so
95	Frank Clark	Defensive end	Kansas City Chiefs		▼10		1st Pro Bowl selection; Super Bowl champion (1st time); 4th consecutive season with 8+ sacks, 2+ forced fumble and 1+ fumble recovery
96	Chris Carson	Running back	Seattle Seahawks		NR		2nd consecutive season with 1,150+ rushing yards and 9 total touchdowns
97	Budda Baker	Safety	Arizona Cardinals		NR		Leading tackler amongst safeties (147); 2nd Pro Bowl selection
98	Brandon Brooks	Guard	Philadelphia Eagles		NR		3rd consecutive Pro Bowl selection
99	Darren Waller	Tight end	Oakland / Las Vegas Raiders		NR		2nd most receiving yards amongst tight ends (1,145); 2nd most receptions amongst tight ends (90)
100	Lavonte David	Linebacker	Tampa Bay Buccaneers		NR		2nd consecutive season of 120+ tackles

=== Sources ===
- 2020 Pro Bowl rosters:
- 2019 All-Pro Team:
- PFWA All-Rookie Team:
