= Quenton Nelson =

American football player (born 1996)

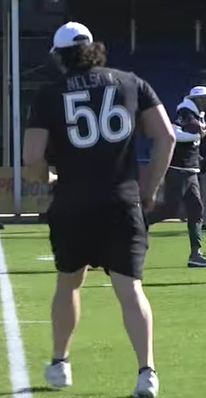
- Nelson at the 2020 Pro Bowl

No. 53 – Seattle Seahawks
- Position: Guard
- Roster status: Active

Personal information
- Born: March 19, 1996 (age 30); Holmdel, New Jersey, U.S.
- Listed height: 6 ft 5 in (1.96 m)
- Listed weight: 330 lb (150 kg)

Career information
- High school: Red Bank Catholic (Red Bank, New Jersey)
- College: Notre Dame (2014–2017)
- NFL draft: 2018: 1st round, 6th overall pick

Career history
- Indianapolis Colts (2018–2026); Seattle Seahawks (2026–present)

Awards and highlights
- 3× First-team All-Pro (2018–2020); 3× Second-team All-Pro (2021, 2024, 2025); 8× Pro Bowl (2018–2025); PFWA All-Rookie Team (2018); Unanimous All-American (2017)

Career NFL statistics as of Week 8, 2026
- Games played: 137
- Games started: 137
- Fumble recoveries: 2
- Stats at Pro Football Reference

Quenton Emerson Nelson (born March 19, 1996) is an American professional football guard for the Seattle Seahawks of the National Football League (NFL). He played college football at Notre Dame, earning unanimous All-American honors in 2017. Nelson was selected by the Indianapolis Colts sixth overall in the 2018 NFL draft. Considered among the NFL's best guards, he has received Pro Bowl selections in all eight of his seasons and three first-team All-Pros. After nine seasons with the Colts, Nelson was traded to the Seahawks during the 2026 season.

== Early life ==
Nelson is the youngest of four children of Craig and Maryellen Nelson. He grew up in Holmdel Township, New Jersey and attended Holmdel High School as a freshman before transferring to Red Bank Catholic High School in Red Bank, New Jersey, where he was an All-Star in basketball as a power forward/center. Nelson committed to the University of Notre Dame to play college football. He also supplemented his football and strength trainings with Taekwondo.

== College career ==
After redshirting his first year at Notre Dame in 2014, Nelson played in all 12 games and made one start in 2015. In 2016, he started all 12 games. Nelson was named a unanimous first team All-American after the 2017 season. On January 8, 2018, he announced that he would forgo his final year of eligibility and enter the 2018 NFL draft.

== Professional career ==
=== Pre-draft ===
At the end of the pre-draft process, Nelson was projected a top ten selection in the first round by NFL draft experts and scouts. He was ranked as the top offensive linemen prospect in the draft by Sports Illustrated and NFL analysts Daniel Jeremiah and Mike Mayock.

Pre-draft measurables
Height	Weight	Arm length	Hand span	Wingspan	20-yard shuttle	Three-cone drill	Vertical jump	Broad jump	Bench press
6 ft 5 in (1.96 m)	325 lb (147 kg)	33 3/4 in (0.86 m)	10 3/8 in (0.26 m)	6 ft 10 5/8 in (2.10 m)	4.62 s	7.65 s	26.5 in (0.67 m)	8 ft 9 in (2.67 m)	35 reps
All values from NFL Combine

=== Indianapolis Colts ===
==== 2018 season ====
The Indianapolis Colts selected Nelson in the first round (sixth overall) of the 2018 NFL draft. On May 11, 2018, the Colts signed him to a fully guaranteed four-year, $23.88 million contract, including a signing bonus of $15.45 million.

On November 1, 2018, Nelson was named the NFL Offensive Rookie of the Month for October, after being part of an offensive line that had not allowed a sack in 156 straight drop backs and had 200 rushing yards in back-to-back games for first time in 33 years. Nelson becoming the first guard to ever win the award, and he and Shaquille Leonard (who won Defensive Player of the Month in September) became the first teammates to win awards in the same season. Nelson was named to the Pro Bowl as a rookie and was named first-team All-Pro. He was also named to the PFWA All-Rookie Team.

==== 2019 season ====
In his second professional season, Nelson appeared in and started all 16 games for the Colts. He played 1,042 snaps, allowing no sacks and committing just three penalties; he earned a grade of 91.2 from Pro Football Focus. For the second consecutive season, Nelson was named as a First Team All-Pro and earned a Pro Bowl nomination. He was ranked 29th by his fellow players on the NFL Top 100 Players of 2020.

==== 2020 season ====
In the 2020 season, Nelson again appeared in and started all 16 games for the Colts for the third year in a row. He played 1,082 snaps, only allowed one sack, and committed nine penalties. For the third straight year, Nelson was named as a first-team All-Pro and earned his third Pro Bowl nomination. Nelson was ranked 33rd by his fellow players on the NFL Top 100 Players of 2021.

==== 2021 season ====
On April 28, 2021, the Colts exercised the fifth-year option on Nelson's contract, which guaranteed a salary of $13.754 million for the 2022 season. On August 3, it was revealed that he needed surgery on his left foot, a similar injury that Carson Wentz had suffered a week prior. Recovery time was projected to be five to 12 weeks, but the doctors deemed that the injury was not as serious. During Week 3, Nelson suffered a high ankle sprain and was placed on injured reserve on October 2, 2021. He was activated on October 23.

Nelson was named Associated Press second-team All-Pro. He has the most total All-Pro selections (four) and the most First Team All-Pro selections (three from 2018 to 2020) by a guard in franchise history.

Nelson became just the second player in team history to earn Pro Bowl honors in his first four seasons, joining Alan Ameche (1955–58). He also became the first offensive lineman in the NFL to do it in his first four seasons since Zack Martin (2014–17) and is the first player in franchise history to be selected to four consecutive Pro Bowls since T. Y. Hilton (2014–17). The last Colts offensive linemen to be selected to four consecutive Pro Bowls were Chris Hinton (six consecutive, 1983–89) and Ray Donaldson (four consecutive, 1986–89). Nelson was ranked 28th by his fellow players on the NFL Top 100 Players of 2022.

==== 2022 season ====
On September 10, 2022, Nelson signed a four-year, $80 million contract extension with $60 million guaranteed through 2026, making him the highest-paid guard in the league.

In the 2022 season, Nelson started in all 17 games. He was named to his fifth consecutive Pro Bowl.

==== 2023 season ====
Nelson started all 17 games for the Colts in the 2023 season. He earned Pro Bowl honors for the sixth consecutive season.

==== 2024 season ====
Nelson started all 17 games for the Colts in the 2024 season. He earned Pro Bowl honors for the seventh consecutive season. Nelson was also named as a second-team All-Pro.

==== 2025 season ====
Nelson started all 17 games for the Colts in the 2025 season. He earned Pro Bowl honors for the eighth consecutive season.

=== Seattle Seahawks ===
On October 27, 2026, Nelson was traded to the Seattle Seahawks in exchange for Seattle's 2027 third-round pick and 2028 fifth-round pick.

== NFL career statistics ==
Legend
**Bold**	Career high

Year	Team	Games		Offense					
Year	Team	GP	GS	Snaps	Pct	Holding	False start	Decl/Pen	Acpt/Pen
2018	IND	16	16	1,136	**100%**	**6**	2	0	8
2019	IND	16	16	1,045	97%	3	0	0	3
2020	IND	16	16	1,084	99%	5	1	**1**	7
2021	IND	13	13	768	90%	3	1	**1**	4
2022	IND	17	17	**1,151**	**100%**	1	1	**1**	4
2023	IND	17	17	1,140	99%	3	2	0	6
2024	IND	17	17	1,083	**100%**	1	**7**	0	**11**
2025	IND	17	17	1,038	97%	1	1	0	2
2026	IND	7	7	468	99%	0	1	0	1
2026	SEA	1	1	63	100%	0	1	0	1
Career		137	137	8,976	-	23	17	3	47

== Personal Life ==
On June 20, 2026, Nelson married Farrah Housefield, whom he met in Indianapolis.
