= 2020 All-Pro Team =

Official list of the best NFL players in 2020

The 2020 All-Pro teams were named by the Associated Press (AP), Pro Football Writers of America (PFWA), and Sporting News (SN) for performance in the 2020 NFL season. Any player selected to the first-team of any of the teams can be described as an "All-Pro." The AP team, with first-team and second-team selections, was chosen by a national panel of fifty NFL writers and broadcasters. The Sporting News All-NFL team was voted on by NFL players and executives. The PFWA team is selected by its more than 300 national members who are accredited media members covering the NFL.

For the 2020 vote, the AP removed the offensive "flex" position that had been added to the ballot in 2016, and instead added a third wide receiver to the ballot. They also added long snapper as its own position.

== Teams ==
Offense
Position	First team	Second team
Quarterback	Aaron Rodgers, Green Bay (AP, PFWA); Patrick Mahomes, Kansas City (SN)	Patrick Mahomes, Kansas City (AP-2t); Josh Allen, Buffalo (AP-2t)
Running back	Derrick Henry, Tennessee (AP, PFWA, SN); Dalvin Cook, Minnesota (PFWA, SN)	Alvin Kamara, New Orleans (AP-2)
Wide receiver	Tyreek Hill, Kansas City (AP, PFWA, SN); Stefon Diggs, Buffalo (AP, PFWA, SN); Davante Adams, Green Bay (AP)	DeAndre Hopkins, Arizona (AP-2); Justin Jefferson, Minnesota (AP-2); Calvin Ridley, Atlanta (AP-2t); DK Metcalf, Seattle (AP-2t); Cole Beasley, Buffalo (AP-2t)
Tight end	Travis Kelce, Kansas City (AP, PFWA, SN)	
Left tackle	David Bakhtiari, Green Bay (AP)	Garett Bolles, Denver (AP-2)
Left guard	Quenton Nelson, Indianapolis (AP)	Joel Bitonio, Cleveland (AP-2)
Center	Corey Linsley, Green Bay (AP, PFWA); Jason Kelce, Philadelphia (SN)	Ryan Kelly, Indianapolis (AP-2t); Frank Ragnow, Detroit (AP-2t)
Right guard	Brandon Scherff, Washington (AP)	Wyatt Teller, Cleveland (AP-2)
Right tackle	Jack Conklin, Cleveland (AP)	Ryan Ramczyk, New Orleans (AP-2)
Tackle	David Bakhtiari, Green Bay (PFWA, SN); Jack Conklin, Cleveland (PFWA); Trent Williams, San Francisco (SN)	
Guard	Quenton Nelson, Indianapolis (PFWA, SN); Joel Bitonio, Cleveland (PFWA, SN)	

Special teams
Position	First team	Second team
Kicker	Jason Sanders, Miami (AP, SN-t); Justin Tucker, Baltimore (PFWA); Younghoe Koo, Atlanta (SN-t)	Justin Tucker, Baltimore (AP-2)
Punter	Jake Bailey, New England (AP, PFWA, SN)	Jack Fox, Detroit (AP-2)
Kick returner	Cordarrelle Patterson, Chicago (AP, PFWA, SN)	Andre Roberts, Buffalo (AP-2)
Punt returner	Gunner Olszewski, New England (AP, PFWA, SN)	Jakeem Grant, Miami (AP-2)
Special teams	George Odum, Indianapolis (AP, PFWA)	Matthew Slater, New England (AP-2)
Long snapper	Morgan Cox, Baltimore (AP)	Luke Rhodes, Indianapolis (AP-2)

Defense
Position	First team	Second team
Edge rusher	T. J. Watt, Pittsburgh (AP); Myles Garrett, Cleveland (AP)	Za'Darius Smith, Green Bay (AP-2); Khalil Mack, Chicago (AP-2)
Defensive end	Myles Garrett, Cleveland (PFWA, SN); Trey Hendrickson, New Orleans (PFWA); Joey Bosa, Los Angeles Chargers (SN)	
Interior lineman	Aaron Donald, Los Angeles Rams (AP); DeForest Buckner, Indianapolis (AP)	Chris Jones, Kansas City (AP-2); Cameron Heyward, Pittsburgh (AP-2)
Defensive Tackle	Aaron Donald, Los Angeles Rams (PFWA, SN); DeForest Buckner, Indianapolis (PFWA); Chris Jones, Kansas City (SN)	
Linebacker	Fred Warner, San Francisco (AP, PFWA, SN-t); Bobby Wagner, Seattle (AP); Darius Leonard, Indianapolis (AP, SN-t); T. J. Watt, Pittsburgh (SN); Roquan Smith, Chicago (SN)	Devin White, Tampa Bay (AP-2); Roquan Smith, Chicago (AP-2); Demario Davis, New Orleans (AP-2t); Lavonte David, Tampa Bay (AP-2t)
Outside linebacker	Khalil Mack, Chicago (PFWA); T. J. Watt, Pittsburgh (PFWA)	
Cornerback	Xavien Howard, Miami (AP, PFWA, SN); Jalen Ramsey, Los Angeles Rams (AP, PFWA, SN)	Tre'Davious White, Buffalo (AP-2); Jaire Alexander, Green Bay (AP-2)
Safety	Tyrann Mathieu, Kansas City (AP, PFWA, SN); Minkah Fitzpatrick, Pittsburgh (AP-t, PFWA, SN); Budda Baker, Arizona (AP-t)	Jessie Bates, Cincinnati (AP-2); Jamal Adams, Seattle (AP-2)

== Key ==
- AP = Associated Press first-team All-Pro
- AP-2 = Associated Press second-team All-Pro
- AP-t = Tied for first-team All-Pro in the AP vote
- AP-2t = Tied for second-team All-Pro in the AP vote
- PFWA = Pro Football Writers Association All-NFL
- SN = Sporting News All-Pro

== Number of AP selections per team ==
American Football Conference
Team	Selections
Baltimore Ravens	2
Buffalo Bills	5
Cincinnati Bengals	1
Cleveland Browns	4
Denver Broncos	1
Houston Texans	0
Indianapolis Colts	6
Jacksonville Jaguars	0
Kansas City Chiefs	5
Las Vegas Raiders	0
Los Angeles Chargers	1
Miami Dolphins	3
New England Patriots	3
New York Jets	0
Pittsburgh Steelers	3
Tennessee Titans	1

National Football Conference
Team	Selections
Arizona Cardinals	2
Atlanta Falcons	2
Carolina Panthers	0
Chicago Bears	3
Dallas Cowboys	0
Detroit Lions	2
Green Bay Packers	6
Los Angeles Rams	2
Minnesota Vikings	2
New Orleans Saints	4
New York Giants	0
Philadelphia Eagles	1
San Francisco 49ers	2
Seattle Seahawks	3
Tampa Bay Buccaneers	2
Washington Football Team	1
