= Chris Jones (defensive tackle, born 1994) =

American football player (born 1994)

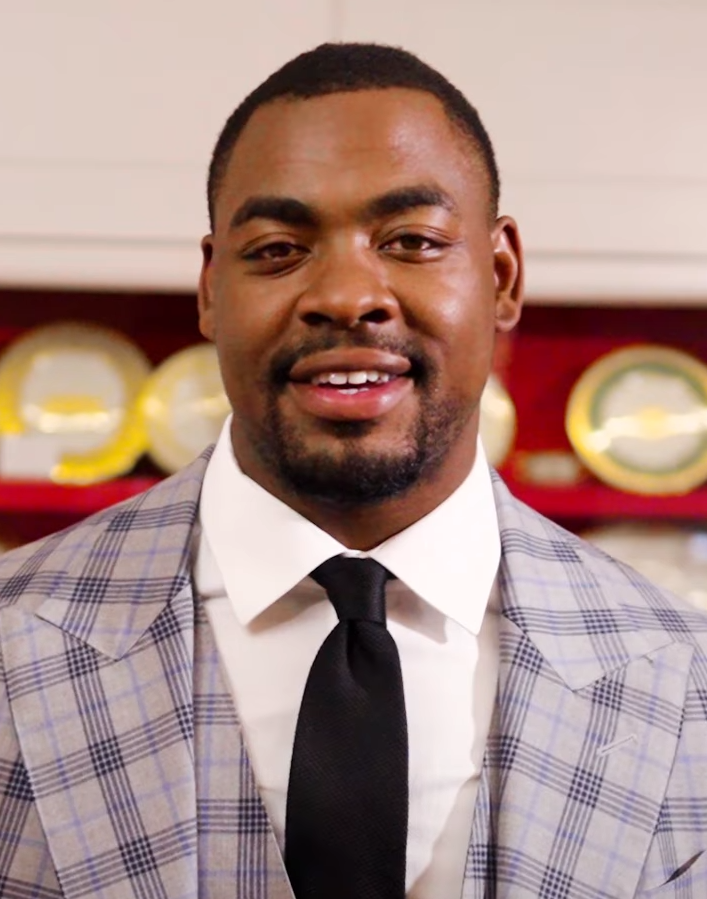
- Jones in 2023

No. 95 – Kansas City Chiefs
- Position: Defensive tackle
- Roster status: Active

Personal information
- Born: July 3, 1994 (age 32); Houston, Mississippi, U.S.
- Listed height: 6 ft 6 in (1.98 m)
- Listed weight: 310 lb (141 kg)

Career information
- High school: Houston (MS)
- College: Mississippi State (2013–2015)
- NFL draft: 2016: 2nd round, 37th overall pick

Career history
- Kansas City Chiefs (2016–present)

Awards and highlights
- 3× Super Bowl champion (LIV, LVII, LVIII); 3× First-team All-Pro (2022–2024); 3× Second-team All-Pro (2018, 2020, 2021); 7× Pro Bowl (2019–2025); PFWA All-Rookie Team (2016); NFL record: Most consecutive games with a sack: 11

Career NFL statistics as of Week 10, 2026
- Tackles: 357
- Sacks: 90.5
- Forced fumbles: 13
- Fumble recoveries: 4
- Pass deflections: 42
- Interceptions: 2
- Defensive touchdowns: 1
- Stats at Pro Football Reference

Christopher Deshun Jones (born July 3, 1994) is an American professional football defensive tackle for the Kansas City Chiefs of the National Football League (NFL). He played college football for the Mississippi State Bulldogs and was selected by the Chiefs in the second round of the 2016 NFL draft. Jones is a three-time Super Bowl champion, a six-time All-Pro member, and a seven-time Pro Bowler.

== Early life ==
Jones attended Houston High School in Houston, Mississippi, where he played high school football for the Hilltoppers. Jones was considered a five-star recruit and was ranked among the top players in his class. He committed to Mississippi State University to play college football.

== College career ==
Jones played for the Mississippi State Bulldogs from 2013 to 2015. As a true freshman in 2013, he appeared in all 13 games and made three starts. He had 32 tackles and three sacks. As a sophomore, he appeared in all 13 games and had 26 tackles and three sacks. As a junior, he started all 13 games, recording 44 tackles and 2.5 sacks. Following the conclusion of his junior year, Jones made the decision to forgo his senior year and enter the 2016 NFL draft.

== Professional career ==
=== Pre-draft ===
Coming out of college, Jones was projected by analysts and scouts to be drafted in the second round. He was ranked the eighth-best defensive tackle and the 48th-best prospect by NFLDraftScout.com. Jones was invited to the NFL Combine and completed the entire workout and all the positional drills. While running the 40-yard dash, Jones had a wardrobe malfunction that exposed his genitalia before falling to the ground to fix the issue. This went viral on social media. He attended Mississippi State's Pro Day, but decided he was satisfied with his combine performance and only performed positional drills.

Pre-draft measurables
Height	Weight	Arm length	Hand span	Wingspan	40-yard dash	10-yard split	20-yard split	20-yard shuttle	Three-cone drill	Vertical jump	Broad jump	Bench press
6 ft 5 3/4 in (1.97 m)	310 lb (141 kg)	34 1/2 in (0.88 m)	10 3/4 in (0.27 m)	7 ft 1 in (2.16 m)	5.03 s	1.70 s	2.86 s	4.62 s	7.44 s	29.5 in (0.75 m)	8 ft 10 in (2.69 m)	26 reps
All values from NFL Combine/Pro Day

=== 2016 ===
The Kansas City Chiefs selected Jones in the second round with the 37th overall pick in the 2016 NFL draft. Jones was the fifth defensive tackle drafted in 2016.

External videos
- Chiefs draft Chris Jones 37th overall
- NFL Draft Profile: Chris Jones

On May 8, 2016, the Chiefs signed Jones to a four-year, $6.23 million contract with $3.44 million guaranteed and a signing bonus of $2.73 million.

He entered training camp competing with Jaye Howard, Allen Bailey, Nick Williams, and Jimmy Staten to be the starting defensive end. Jones was named the backup left defensive end, behind Jaye Howard, to begin the regular season.

Jones made his professional regular season debut in the Chiefs' season-opening 33–27 victory over the San Diego Chargers. The following week, he recorded his first tackle and finished with two solo tackles in a 19–12 loss to the Houston Texans. On October 18, 2016, he was named the starting right defensive end after Allen Bailey was placed on injured-reserve with a shoulder injury. On October 23, 2016, Jones earned his first career start and recorded two solo tackles in a 27–21 win against the New Orleans Saints. The next game, he made a solo tackle and his first career sack on Andrew Luck in a 30–14 victory over the Indianapolis Colts. In a Week 10 matchup with the Carolina Panthers, Jones made three solo tackles and sacked Cam Newton in a 20–17 win. On December 8, 2016, he recorded a season-high five combined tackles in a 21–13 win against the Oakland Raiders. On January 1, 2017, Jones recorded a season-high four solo tackles in a 37–27 win against the San Diego Chargers. In the playoffs, the Chiefs lost 18-16 to the Pittsburgh Steelers in the divisional round. He finished his rookie season with 28 combined tackles, two sacks, and four pass deflections in 16 games and 11 starts. He was named to the NFL All-Rookie Team.

=== 2017 ===
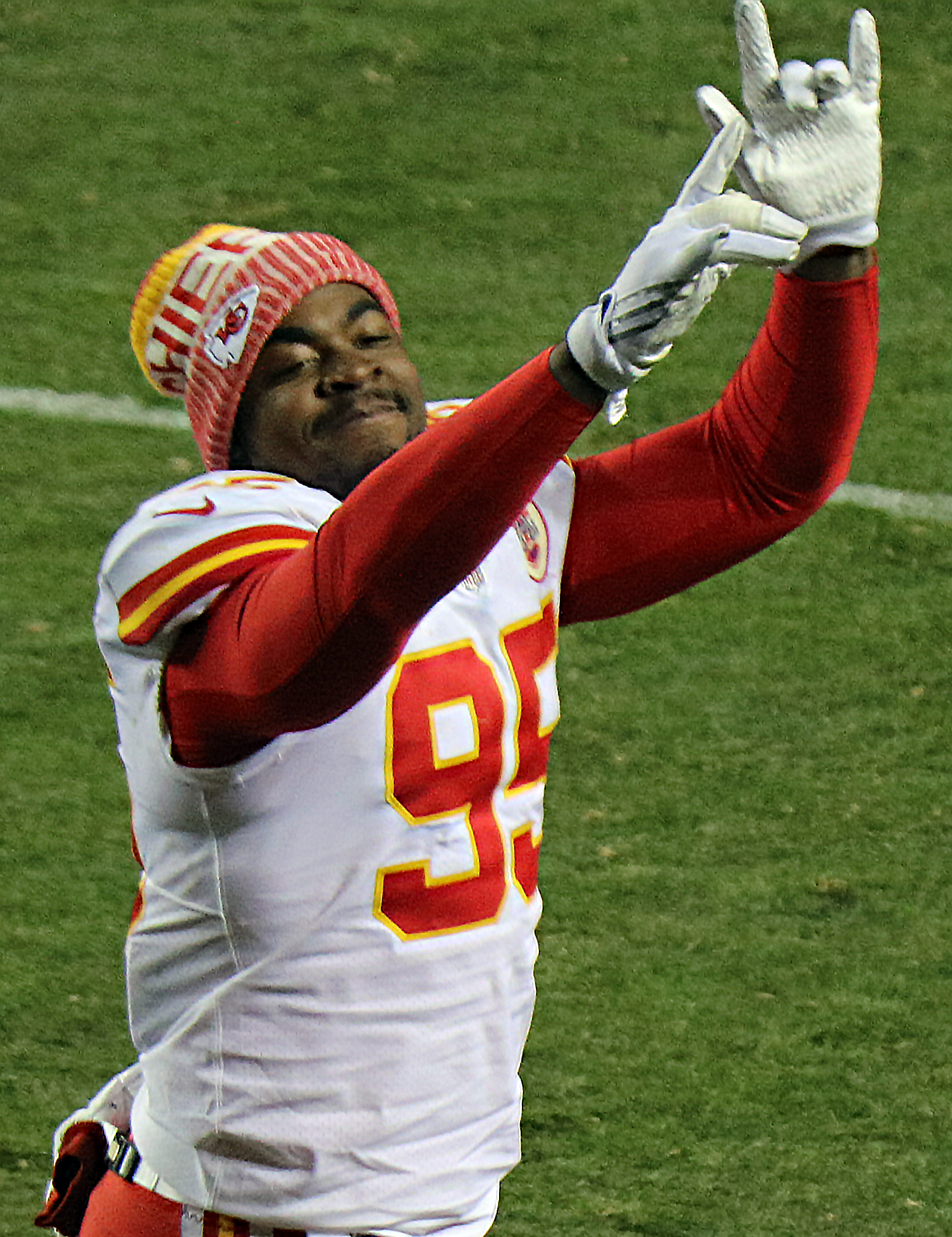
Jones with the Chiefs in 2017

On September 17, 2017, in Week 2, Jones recorded three sacks, two forced fumbles, and an interception in a 27–20 win over the Philadelphia Eagles, earning him AFC Defensive Player of the Week. Overall, he finished the 2017 season with 6.5 sacks, 32 total tackles, one interception, seven passes defensed, and four forced fumbles with five starts and 16 appearances.

=== 2018 ===
During Week 5 against the Jacksonville Jaguars, Jones returned an interception 20 yards for a touchdown in the 30–14 victory. Later in the same game, he was ejected for punching Andrew Norwell in his right thigh after an extra point attempt. Jones has recorded a sack in all games from Week 5 to Week 16, setting an NFL record of 11 consecutive games with a sack. Jones broke the NFL record held previously by Simon Fletcher who recorded a sack from Week 11 of 1992 to Week 3 of the 1993 season. Jones was named AFC Defensive Player of the Month for November. He finished the season third in the league with 15.5 sacks, which led the Chiefs, along with 40 combined tackles, five passes defensed, two forced fumbles, and an interception. He was named second-team All-Pro for his performance in 2018. He was ranked 36th by his fellow players on the NFL Top 100 Players of 2019.

=== 2019 ===
In Week 10 against the Tennessee Titans, Jones recorded two sacks on Ryan Tannehill, one of which was a strip sack recovered by teammate Tanoh Kpassagnon, in the 35–32 loss. Jones was named to his first Pro Bowl. Overall, Jones finished the 2019 season with 36 total tackles, nine sacks, one forced fumble, one fumble recovery, and four passes defensed. Jones helped the Chiefs reach Super Bowl LIV. Jones recorded only one tackle, but forced the game's first turnover and broke up three passes from Jimmy Garoppolo. The Chiefs defeated the San Francisco 49ers 31–20. He was ranked 52nd by his fellow players on the NFL Top 100 Players of 2020.

=== 2020 ===
On March 16, 2020, the Chiefs placed the franchise tag on Jones. On July 15, Jones signed a four-year contract worth $80 million, with $60 million guaranteed. He was placed on the COVID-19 reserve list on November 5, after coming in contact with someone who tested positive for the virus. He was removed the following day. In Week 14, against the Miami Dolphins, he recorded his first career safety on a sack on quarterback Tua Tagovailoa. Jones finished the 2020 season with 36 total tackles, 7.5 sacks, four passes defensed, and two forced fumbles. He was named to his second Pro Bowl. The Chiefs went on to reach Super Bowl LV, but failed to defend their championship after losing to the Tampa Bay Buccaneers 31–9. He was ranked 34th by his fellow players on the NFL Top 100 Players of 2021.

=== 2021 ===
In Week 11, Jones had five tackles, 3.5 sacks, a pass deflection, a forced fumble, and a fumble recovery in a 19–9 win over the Dallas Cowboys, earning AFC Defensive Player of the Week. He was named to his third consecutive Pro Bowl. He was ranked 39th by his fellow players on the NFL Top 100 Players of 2022.

=== 2022 ===
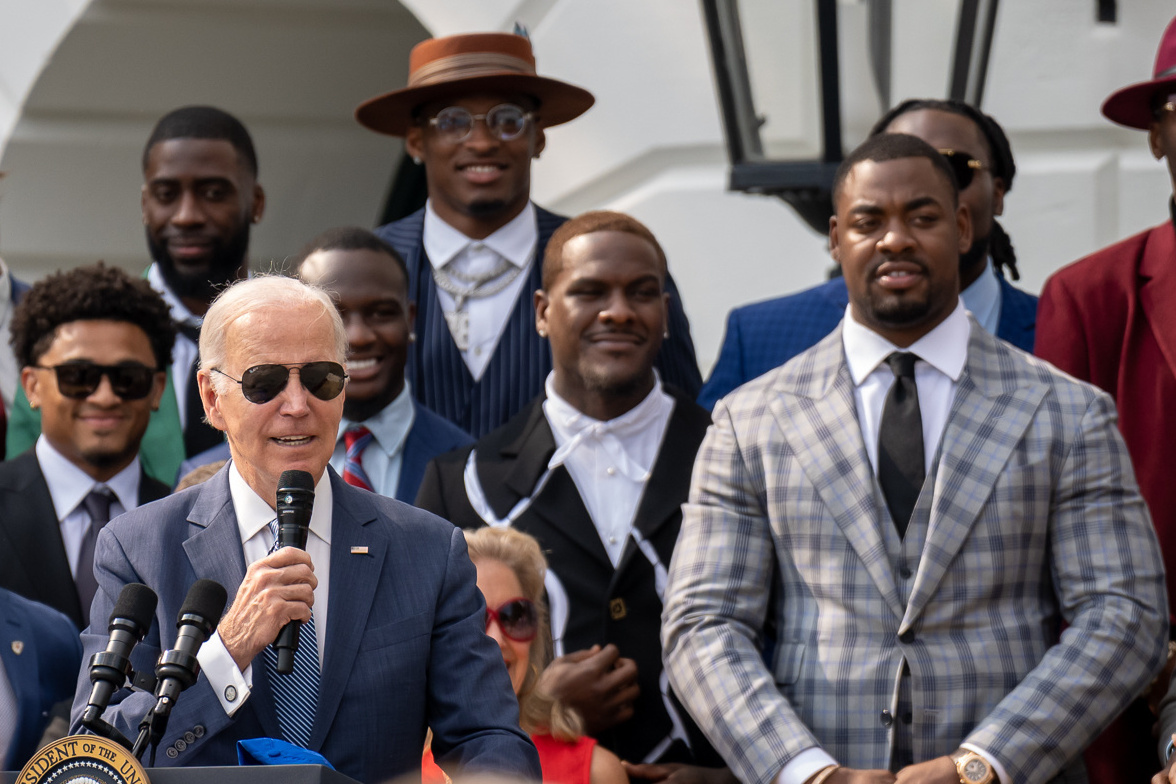
Jones (right) with President Joe Biden after winning his second Super Bowl.

In 2022, Jones recorded 44 tackles, 15.5 sacks, two forced fumbles, and one fumble recovery. Jones earned Pro Bowl and first team All-Pro honors. He helped the Chiefs get the #1 seed in the AFC. The Chiefs defeated the Jacksonville Jaguars in the AFC Divisional Round to set up a rematch with Cincinnati Bengals in the AFC Championship Game. Jones had two sacks on Joe Burrow in the Chiefs 23–20 victory. In Super Bowl LVII, Jones recorded three tackles in the Chiefs 38–35 win over the Philadelphia Eagles. He was ranked tenth by his fellow players on the NFL Top 100 Players of 2023.

=== 2023 ===
Jones did not report to the Chiefs' training camp. He reportedly did not show up because he was holding out for a contract extension as the 2023 season is the final year of his contract. Jones received a mandatory fine of $50,000 for each day he did not report. The Chiefs placed him on the reserve/did not report list on August 29, 2023. On September 11, 2023, Jones and the Chiefs agreed to a new one-year contract. The Chiefs activated him the following day and received a roster exemption. He finished the 2023 season with 10.5 sacks, 30 tackles, and four passes defended. Once again, he earned Pro Bowl and first team All-Pro honors. The Chiefs faced off against the 49ers in Super Bowl LVIII, which was the Chiefs' second consecutive Super Bowl appearance (and fourth appearance in five seasons). Jones recorded four combined tackles (two solo) in the game. Most importantly, on the first drive of overtime, Jones generated a critical third down pressure in the red zone to prevent a San Francisco third down conversion and touchdown. San Francisco had to settle for a field goal as a result, and Kansas City scored a touchdown on the ensuing drive to win the game and the championship. He was ranked sixth by his fellow players on the NFL Top 100 Players of 2024.

=== 2024 ===
Jones was initially a free agent following the 2023 season, but he signed a five-year, $158.75 million deal to return to the Chiefs on March 11, 2024. The contract contains $101 million in guarantees and makes him the highest-paid defensive tackle in NFL history in average annual value.

In Week 4, Jones recorded two sacks, four tackles, and four quarterback pressures in a 17–10 win over the Chargers, earning AFC Defensive Player of the Week. He finished the 2024 season with five sacks, 37 tackles, and one forced fumble. He earned Pro Bowl and first team All-Pro honors. He was ranked 12th by his fellow players on the NFL Top 100 Players of 2025.

=== 2025 ===
In the 2025 season, Jones had seven sacks, 29 total tackles (15 solo), and two passes defended. He was named to his seventh consecutive Pro Bowl.

=== 2026 ===
In Week 9 against the New York Jets, Jones tallied five pressures, two sacks and a batted pass, earning him AFC Defensive Player of the Week honors.

== Career statistics ==
Legend
	Won the Super Bowl
	Led the league
**Bold**	Career high

=== NFL ===
==== Regular season ====
Year	Team	Games		Tackles						Interceptions						Fumbles	
Year	Team	GP	GS	Cmb	Solo	Ast	Sck	TFL	Sfty	PD	Int	Yds	Avg	Lng	TD	FF	FR
2016	KC	16	11	28	17	11	2.0	5	0	4	0	0	0.0	0	0	0	0
2017	KC	16	7	32	22	10	6.5	5	0	**7**	**1**	−3	−3.0	−3	0	**4**	0
2018	KC	16	11	40	**35**	5	**15.5**	**19**	0	5	**1**	**20**	**20.0**	**20T**	**1**	2	0
2019	KC	13	12	36	23	13	9.0	8	0	4	0	0	0.0	0	0	1	**1**
2020	KC	15	14	36	23	13	7.5	3	**1**	4	0	0	0.0	0	0	2	0
2021	KC	14	14	27	18	9	9.0	8	0	5	0	0	0.0	0	0	1	**1**
2022	KC	17	17	**44**	30	14	**15.5**	17	0	4	0	0	0.0	0	0	2	**1**
2023	KC	16	16	30	20	10	10.5	13	0	4	0	0	0.0	0	0	0	0
2024	KC	15	15	37	19	**18**	5.0	9	0	0	0	0	0.0	0	0	1	0
2025	KC	17	17	29	15	14	7.0	12	0	2	0	0	0.0	0	0	0	0
2026	KC	9	9	18	8	10	3.0	3	0	3	0	0	0.0	0	0	0	1
Career		164	143	357	230	127	90.5	102	1	42	2	17	8.5	20	1	13	4

==== Postseason ====
Year	Team	Games		Tackles						Interceptions						Fumbles	
Year	Team	GP	GS	Cmb	Solo	Ast	Sck	TFL	Sfty	PD	Int	Yds	Avg	Lng	TD	FF	FR
2016	KC	1	1	2	1	1	0.0	0	0	2	0	0	0.0	0	0	0	0
2017	KC	1	1	2	1	1	0.0	0	0	0	0	0	0.0	0	0	0	0
2018	KC	2	1	0	0	0	0.0	0	0	**4**	0	0	0.0	0	0	0	0
2019	KC	2	1	3	1	2	0.0	0	0	3	0	0	0.0	0	0	0	0
2020	KC	3	3	**9**	4	**5**	0.0	0	0	0	0	0	0.0	0	0	0	0
2021	KC	3	3	6	4	2	0.0	2	0	0	0	0	0.0	0	0	0	0
2022	KC	3	3	8	**6**	2	**2.0**	**3**	0	0	0	0	0.0	0	0	0	0
2023	KC	4	4	8	4	4	0.5	0	0	2	0	0	0.0	0	0	**1**	0
2024	KC	3	3	5	1	4	1.0	1	0	0	0	0	0.0	0	0	0	0
Career		22	20	43	22	21	3.5	6	0	11	0	0	0.0	0	0	1	0

=== College ===
Year	Team	GP	Tackles					Interceptions				Fumbles	
Year	Team	GP	Cmb	Solo	Ast	TFL	Sck	Int	Yds	TD	PD	FF	FR
2013	Mississippi State	13	32	**17**	15	7.0	**3.0**	0	0	0	3	0	0
2014	Mississippi State	13	26	9	17	3.5	**3.0**	0	0	0	2	0	0
2015	Mississippi State	13	**44**	16	**28**	**7.5**	2.5	0	0	0	**4**	0	0
Career		39	102	42	60	18.0	8.5	0	0	0	9	0	0

== Awards and honors ==
- 3× Super Bowl champion (LIV, LVII, LVIII)
- 3× First-team All-Pro (2022–2024)
- 3× Second-team All-Pro (2018, 2020, 2021)
- 7× Pro Bowl (2019–2025)
- PFWA All-Rookie Team (2016)
- Ranked No. 36 in the Top 100 Players of 2019
- Ranked No. 52 in the Top 100 Players of 2020
- Ranked No. 34 in the Top 100 Players of 2021
- Ranked No. 39 in the Top 100 Players of 2022
- Ranked No. 10 in the Top 100 Players of 2023
- Ranked No. 6 in the Top 100 Players of 2024
- Ranked No. 12 in the Top 100 Players of 2025
- Ranked No. 43 in the Top 100 Players of 2026

== Personal life ==
Jones endorses environmental protection.
