= Joel Bitonio =

American football player (born 1991)

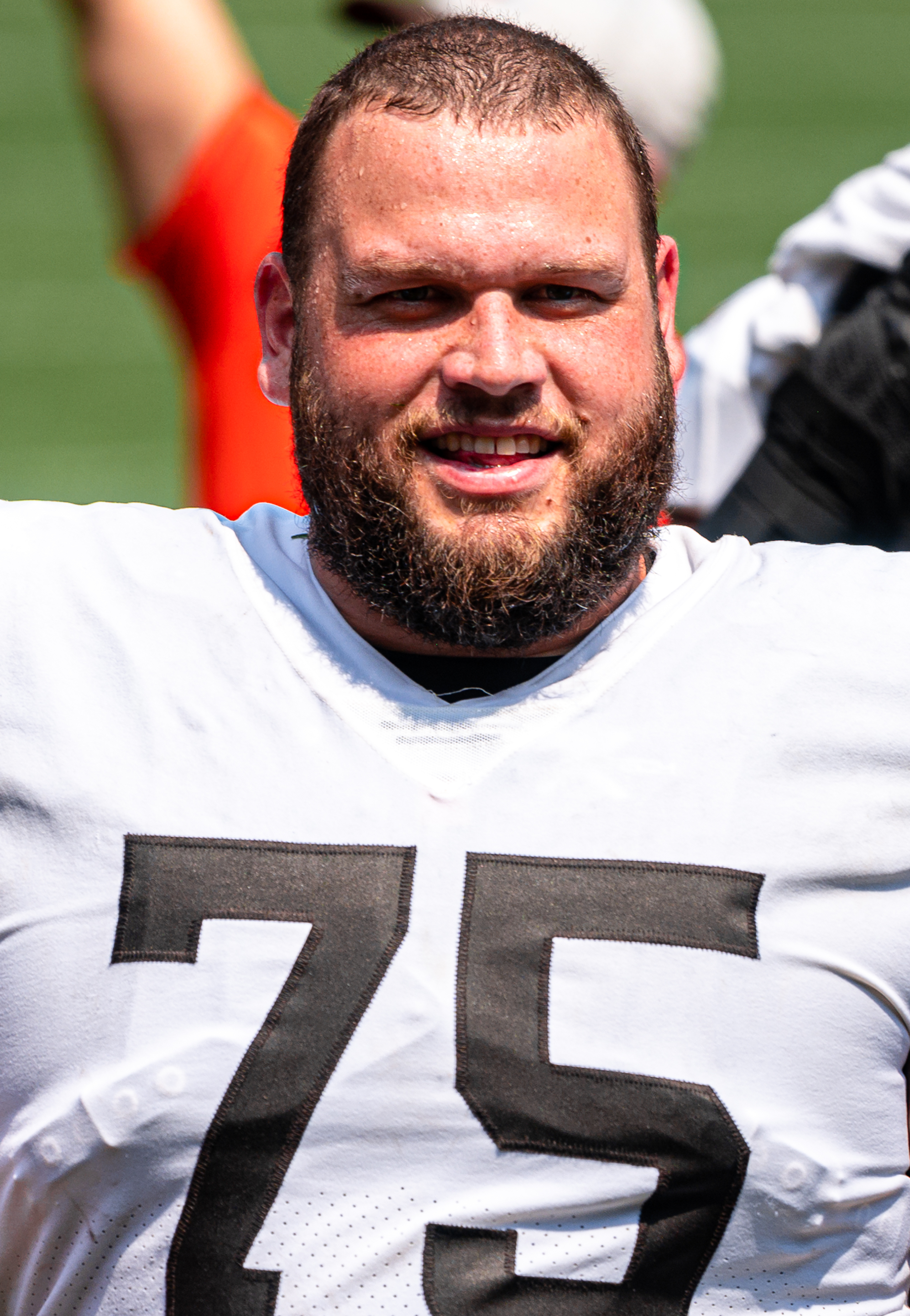
- Bitonio with the Cleveland Browns in 2021

No. 75
- Position: Guard

Personal information
- Born: October 11, 1991 (age 35); San Pedro, California, U.S.
- Listed height: 6 ft 4 in (1.93 m)
- Listed weight: 320 lb (145 kg)

Career information
- High school: Woodrow Wilson Classical (Long Beach, California)
- College: Nevada (2009–2013)
- NFL draft: 2014: 2nd round, 35th overall pick

Career history
- Cleveland Browns (2014–2025)

Awards and highlights
- 2× First-team All-Pro (2021, 2022); 3× Second-team All-Pro (2018–2020); 7× Pro Bowl (2018–2024); PFWA All-Rookie Team (2014); First-team All-MWC (2013)

Career NFL statistics
- Games played: 178
- Games started: 178
- Stats at Pro Football Reference

Joel Michael Bitonio (born October 11, 1991) is an American former professional football player who spent his entire 12-year career as a guard for the Cleveland Browns of the National Football League (NFL). He played college football for the Nevada Wolf Pack. He was selected by the Browns in the second round of the 2014 NFL draft. During his NFL career, Bitonio was named to seven Pro Bowls, two first-team and three second-team All-Pro teams.

== Early life ==
Bitonio attended Long Beach Wilson High School in Long Beach, California, where he was a three-sport star. He was named to the Press Telegram's Dream Team for football and basketball as a senior. In football, he was a two-time All-league selection and was the Moore League Lineman of the Year. He was a first-team All-conference selection and was named second-team All-state by MaxPreps.com. Bitonio also lettered in track & field as a senior. He led the league in the shot put, recording a top-throw of 15.39 meters at the 2009 CIF Southern Section Division 1 Prelims.

== College career ==
Bitonio attended the University of Nevada from 2009 to 2013. He started 39 consecutive games from his redshirt sophomore to senior seasons. As a senior, he was an All-Mountain West Conference selection.

== Professional career ==
Pre-draft measurables
Height	Weight	Arm length	Hand span	Wingspan	40-yard dash	10-yard split	20-yard split	20-yard shuttle	Three-cone drill	Vertical jump	Broad jump	Bench press
6 ft 4 1/4 in (1.94 m)	302 lb (137 kg)	33 7/8 in (0.86 m)	9 5/8 in (0.24 m)	6 ft 9 in (2.06 m)	4.97 s	1.78 s	2.90 s	4.44 s	7.37 s	32.0 in (0.81 m)	9 ft 6 in (2.90 m)	22 reps
All values from NFL Combine

Bitonio was considered one of the top offensive tackle prospects for the 2014 NFL draft. He was selected by the Cleveland Browns in the second round (35th overall) of the 2014 NFL draft. He was named to the PFWA All-Rookie Team.

On December 7, 2015, Bitonio was placed on injured reserve.

On October 14, 2016, Bitonio was again placed on injured reserve after sustaining a foot injury in Week 5.

On March 9, 2017, Bitonio signed a five-year contract extension with the Browns through the 2022 season. He was named to his first Pro Bowl and was named second-team All-Pro after starting all 16 games at left guard.

Bitonio was named to the 2020 All-Pro Team, along with three of his teammates: defensive end Myles Garrett, tackle Jack Conklin, and fellow guard Wyatt Teller. Bitonio was placed on the reserve/COVID-19 list by the team on January 5, 2021, and activated on January 15.

On November 10, 2021, Bitonio signed a three-year, $48 million contract extension through the 2025 season.

On June 9, 2026, Bitonio announced his retirement from professional football after 12 years in the NFL.

== Personal life ==
His father, Mike Bitonio, was a mixed martial arts fighter. He died at the age of 45 in 2010.
