= NFL Top 100 Players of 2019 =

- Season 2019
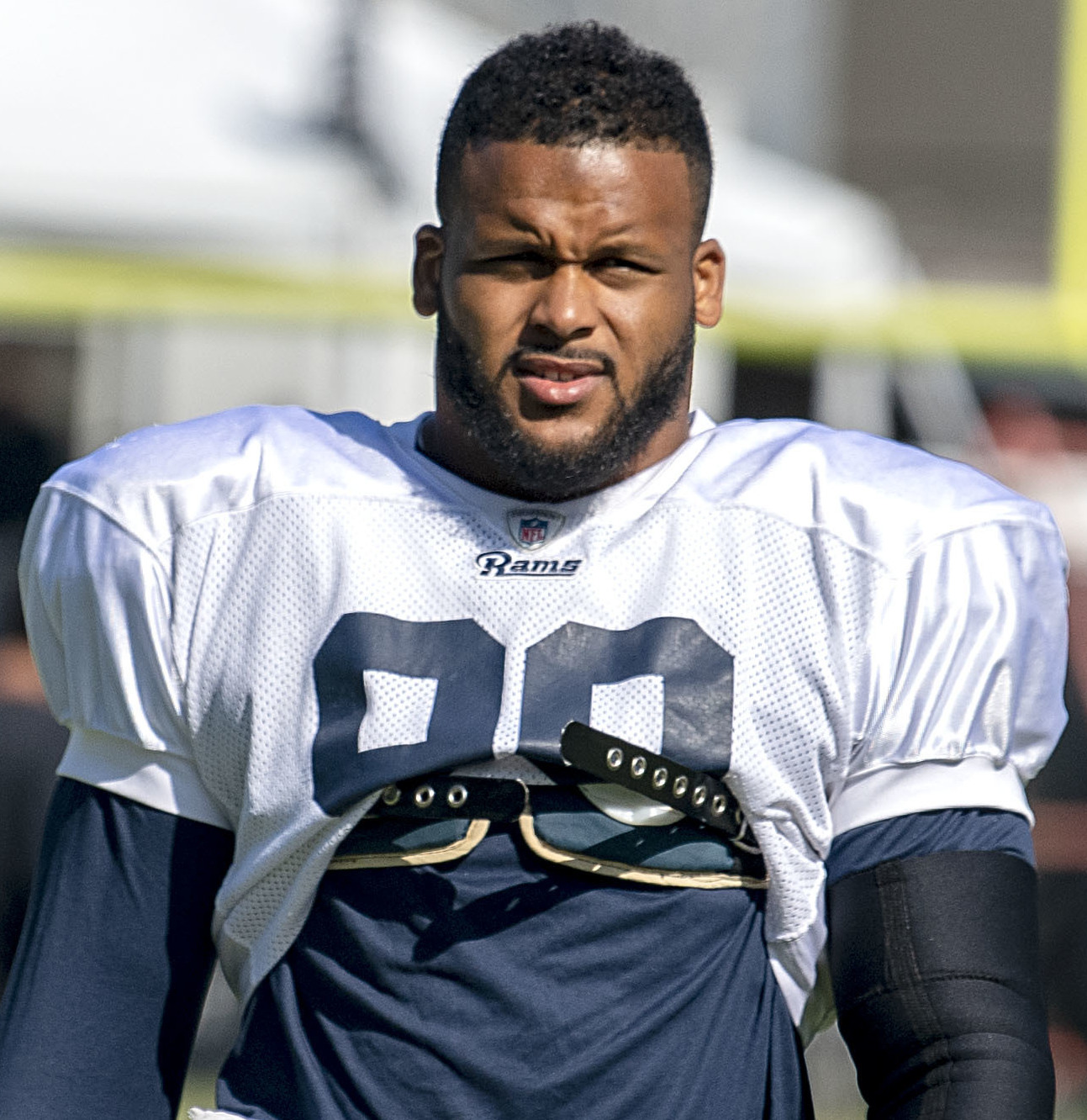
- Aaron Donald, the #1 ranked player

Release
- Original network: NFL Network
- Original release: July 22 – July 31, 2019

Season chronology
- ← Previous; 2018 Next → 2020

The NFL Top 100 Players of 2019 was the ninth season in the NFL Top 100 series. It premiered on July 22, 2019 and the final episode aired on July 31, 2019. It started later in the year, and the show was shown in 10 consecutive days instead. Los Angeles Rams defensive tackle Aaron Donald was named the number one player. The Dallas Cowboys had the most players on the list with 8, while the Buffalo Bills had no players on the list.

== Episode list ==
Episode No.	Air date	Numbers revealed
1	July 22	100–91
2	July 23	90–81
3	July 24	80–71
4	July 25	70–61
5	July 26	60–51
6	July 27	50–41
7	July 28	40–31
8	July 29	30–21
9	July 30	20–11
10	July 31	10–1

== The list ==
Rank	Player	Position	2018 team	2019 team	Rank change	Reference	Year accomplishments
1	Aaron Donald	Defensive tackle	Los Angeles Rams		▲6		5th Pro Bowl selection; 4th First-team All-Pro selection; 2nd time as NFL Defensive Player of the Year; NFL sacks leader (20.5); Broke the record for most sacks in a season by a defensive tackle
2	Drew Brees	Quarterback	New Orleans Saints		▲6		12th Pro Bowl selection; 4th Second-team All-Pro selection; 2nd time as NFL passer rating leader (115.7); 5th time as NFL completion percentage leader (74.4%) which is also an NFL record; Broke Peyton Manning's all-time passing yardage; Art Rooney Award
3	Khalil Mack	Linebacker	Chicago Bears		▲13		4th Pro Bowl selection; 3rd First-team All-Pro selection; 2nd Butkus Award (Pro); Became the first player since 1982 to record a sack, forced fumble, a fumble recovery, interception, and touchdown in one half
4	Patrick Mahomes	Quarterback	Kansas City Chiefs		NR		1st Pro Bowl selection; 2019 Pro Bowl Offensive MVP; 1st First-team All-Pro selection; AP MVP; NFL Offensive Player of the Year; NFL passing touchdowns leader (50); Bert Bell Award; Most consecutive 300-plus passing yard games (tied at 8); Youngest quarterback to throw for 50 touchdowns in a season; Youngest quarterback to throw for 5,000 yards in a season (tied); Second quarterback in NFL history to throw for 5,000+ yards and 50+ touchdowns
5	Todd Gurley	Running back	Los Angeles Rams		▲1		3rd Pro Bowl selection; 2nd First-team All-Pro selection; 2nd time as NFL rushing touchdowns leader (17)
6	Tom Brady	Quarterback	New England Patriots		▼5		14th Pro Bowl selection; Won His NFL Record Sixth Super Bowl
7	Antonio Brown	Wide receiver	Pittsburgh Steelers	New England Patriots	▼5		7th Pro Bowl selection; NFL receiving touchdowns leader (15)
8	Aaron Rodgers	Quarterback	Green Bay Packers		▲2		7th Pro Bowl selection; Broke Tom Brady's NFL record by converting his 359th consecutive pass without an interception; Set an NFL record for interception percentage for a season, with only 0.335% of his passes being intercepted
9	Julio Jones	Wide receiver	Atlanta Falcons		▼5		6th Pro Bowl selection; 2nd Second-team All-Pro selection; Fastest player in NFL history to reach 10,000 career receiving yards (104 games); Only player during the 2018 season to average more than 100 receiving yards per game; 2nd time as NFL receiving yards leader (1,677)
10	Von Miller	Linebacker	Denver Broncos		▼1		7th Pro Bowl selection; 4th Second-team All-Pro selection
11	DeAndre Hopkins	Wide receiver	Houston Texans		▲2		3rd Pro Bowl selection; 2nd First-team All-Pro selection
12	J. J. Watt	Defensive end	Houston Texans		▲72		5th Pro Bowl selection; 5th First-team All-Pro selection
13	Michael Thomas	Wide receiver	New Orleans Saints		▲68		2nd Pro Bowl selection; 1st First-team All-Pro selection; NFL receptions leader (125); NFL record for most receptions by a player through his first three seasons (321)
14	Alvin Kamara	Running back	New Orleans Saints		▲6		2nd Pro Bowl selection; Tied the franchise record for most touchdowns in a single season (14); Became the first player in NFL history to have 1,000 rushing yards and 1,000 receiving yards in his first 20 games
15	Bobby Wagner	Linebacker	Seattle Seahawks		▲6		5th Pro Bowl selection; 4th First-team All-Pro selection
16	Saquon Barkley	Running back	New York Giants		NR		1st Pro Bowl selection; Pepsi NFL Rookie of the Year (2018); NFL Offensive Rookie of the Year (2018); PFWA All-Rookie Team (2018); Tied the NFL single game record for catches by a rookie; NFL record for most 100+ yards from scrimmage games by a rookie (12 games); NFL record for most scrimmage yards by a rookie (2,028;Led NFL in scrimmage yards); Tied with Randy Moss for most 50+ yard touchdowns by a rookie (5); NFL record for most receptions by a rookie running back (91 receptions)
17	Philip Rivers	Quarterback	Los Angeles Chargers		▲39		8th Pro Bowl selection; Tied Ryan Tannehill for most straight completions, with 25; Set an NFL-record for one incompletion in 29 attempts, for a record 96.55%
18	Ezekiel Elliott	Running back	Dallas Cowboys		▲36		2nd Pro Bowl selection; 1st Second-team All-Pro selection; NFL rushing yards leader (2nd time, 1434 yards)
19	Tyreek Hill	Wide receiver	Kansas City Chiefs		▲21		3rd Pro Bowl selection; 2nd First-team All-Pro selection (Flex receiver)
20	Andrew Luck	Quarterback	Indianapolis Colts*		NR		4th Pro Bowl selection; NFL Comeback Player of the Year (2018)
21	Travis Kelce	Tight end	Kansas City Chiefs		▲3		4th Pro Bowl selection; 2nd First-team All-Pro selection; Broke the NFL record for most receiving yards by a tight end in a single season, but George Kittle passed him to claim the record less than an hour later.
22	Stephon Gilmore	Cornerback	New England Patriots		NR		2nd Pro Bowl selection; 1st First-team All-Pro selection; Super Bowl champion (1st time)
23	Odell Beckham Jr.	Wide receiver	New York Giants	Cleveland Browns	▲54		Fastest to reach 5,000 career receiving yards (54 games)
24	Luke Kuechly	Linebacker	Carolina Panthers		▼12		6th Pro Bowl selection; 5th First-team All-Pro selection
25	Russell Wilson	Quarterback	Seattle Seahawks		▼14		5th Pro Bowl selection; Steve Largent Award (2nd time)
26	Shaquille Leonard	Linebacker	Indianapolis Colts		NR		1st First-team All-Pro selection; NFL Defensive Rookie of the Year (2018); NFL tackles Leader (2018); PFWA All-Rookie Team (2018)
27	Jalen Ramsey	Cornerback	Jacksonville Jaguars		▼10		2nd Pro Bowl selection
28	Fletcher Cox	Defensive tackle	Philadelphia Eagles		▲41		4th Pro Bowl selection; 1st First-team All-Pro selection
29	George Kittle	Tight end	San Francisco 49ers		NR		1st Pro Bowl selection; 1st Second-team All-Pro selection; Broke Travis Kelce's single-season record for receiving yards by a tight end, with 1,377; First ever tight end to lead the league in Yards After Catch (870)
30	Eddie Jackson	Safety	Chicago Bears		NR		1st Pro Bowl selection; 1st First-team All-Pro selection
31	Derwin James	Safety	Los Angeles Chargers		NR		1st Pro Bowl selection; 1st First-team All-Pro selection; PFWA All-Rookie Team (2018)
32	Jared Goff	Quarterback	Los Angeles Rams		▲6		2nd Pro Bowl selection; NFL record for most passing yards and attempts while maintaining a perfect passer rating (26 of 33 for 465 yards)
33	Adam Thielen	Wide receiver	Minnesota Vikings		▲3		2nd Pro Bowl selection; NFL record for most consecutive 100 yard games to start a season in NFL history (8); Tied with Calvin Johnson for the NFL record of most consecutive 100 yard games in a season
34	Melvin Gordon	Running back	Los Angeles Chargers		NR		2nd Pro Bowl selection
35	Davante Adams	Wide receiver	Green Bay Packers		▲10		2nd Pro Bowl selection
36	Chris Jones	Defensive tackle	Kansas City Chiefs		NR		1st Second-team All-Pro selection; NFL record for most consecutive games with a sack (11)
37	Jamal Adams	Safety	New York Jets		NR		1st Pro Bowl selection; 2019 Pro Bowl Defensive MVP; 1st Second-team All-Pro selection
38	Keenan Allen	Wide receiver	Los Angeles Chargers		▲3		2nd Pro Bowl selection
39	Akiem Hicks	Defensive end	Chicago Bears		NR		1st Pro Bowl selection; Brian Piccolo Award
40	Zach Ertz	Tight end	Philadelphia Eagles		▲28		2nd Pro Bowl selection; NFL record for most receptions by a tight end in a season (116)
41	Cameron Jordan	Defensive end	New Orleans Saints		▼15		4th Pro Bowl selection; 1st Second-team All-Pro selection
42	Christian McCaffrey	Running back	Carolina Panthers		NR		1st Second-team All-Pro selection (Flex); 3rd player in NFL history to achieve 50 rushing yards, 50 receiving yards, and 50 passing yards in a single game; NFL record for most receptions by a running back in a single season (107)
43	David Bakhtiari	Offensive tackle	Green Bay Packers		▲48		1st First-team All-Pro selection
44	Ben Roethlisberger	Quarterback	Pittsburgh Steelers		▼26		NFL passing yards leader
45	DeMarcus Lawrence	Defensive end	Dallas Cowboys		▼11		2nd Pro Bowl selection
46	Patrick Peterson	Cornerback	Arizona Cardinals		▼23		8th Pro Bowl selection; 4th First-team All-Pro selection
47	JuJu Smith-Schuster	Wide receiver	Pittsburgh Steelers		NR		1st Pro Bowl selection; 1st player ever to have two offensive touchdowns of at least 97 yards
48	Melvin Ingram	Defensive end	Los Angeles Chargers		▲28		2nd Pro Bowl selection
49	Myles Garrett	Defensive end	Cleveland Browns		NR		1st Pro Bowl selection; 1st Second-team All-Pro selection
50	Baker Mayfield	Quarterback	Cleveland Browns		NR		PFWA All-Rookie Team (2018); 2nd player in NFL history to not start a game, throw for more than 200 yards, and win the game; Surpassed Peyton Manning and Russell Wilson for most touchdowns thrown by a rookie (27)
51	Deshaun Watson	Quarterback	Houston Texans		▼1		1st Pro Bowl selection
52	Tyron Smith	Offensive tackle	Dallas Cowboys		▼13		6th Pro Bowl selection
53	Mike Evans	Wide receiver	Tampa Bay Buccaneers		NR		2nd Pro Bowl selection; 3rd receiver in NFL history to begin their career with five consecutive 1,000+ yard seasons; Youngest player to reach 6,000 career receiving yards; Youngest player to have 5 seasons of 1,000 receiving yards
54	Calais Campbell	Defensive end	Jacksonville Jaguars		▼40		4th Pro Bowl selection; Bart Starr Award
55	Xavien Howard	Cornerback	Miami Dolphins		NR		1st Pro Bowl selection; 1st Second-team All-Pro selection; NFL interceptions co-leader (7, with Kyle Fuller, Damontae Kazee)
56	Joey Bosa	Defensive end	Los Angeles Chargers		▼19		
57	Danielle Hunter	Defensive end	Minnesota Vikings		NR		1st Pro Bowl selection; 1st Second-team All-Pro selection
58	A. J. Green	Wide receiver	Cincinnati Bengals		▼36		
59	Zack Martin	Guard	Dallas Cowboys		▲12		5th Pro Bowl selection; 3rd First-team All-Pro selection
60	Larry Fitzgerald	Wide receiver	Arizona Cardinals		▼33		
61	Jaylon Smith	Linebacker	Dallas Cowboys		NR		PFF's Breakout Player of the Year
62	James Conner	Running back	Pittsburgh Steelers		NR		1st Pro Bowl selection
63	Jadeveon Clowney	Outside linebacker	Houston Texans	Seattle Seahawks	▼31		3rd Pro Bowl selection
64	Amari Cooper	Wide receiver	Oakland Raiders/Dallas Cowboys	Dallas Cowboys	NR		3rd Pro Bowl selection
65	Jason Pierre-Paul	Outside linebacker	Tampa Bay Buccaneers		NR		
66	Eric Ebron	Tight end	Indianapolis Colts		NR		1st Pro Bowl selection
67	Dee Ford	Defensive end	Kansas City Chiefs	San Francisco 49ers	NR		1st Pro Bowl selection; Ed Block Courage Award
68	Phillip Lindsay	Running back	Denver Broncos		NR		1st Pro Bowl selection; PFWA All-Rookie Team (2018)
69	Matt Ryan	Quarterback	Atlanta Falcons		▼40		
70	T. Y. Hilton	Wide receiver	Indianapolis Colts		NR		
71	C. J. Mosley	Linebacker	Baltimore Ravens	New York Jets	▲27		4th Pro Bowl selection; 4th Second-team All-Pro selection
72	Jason Kelce	Center	Philadelphia Eagles		NR		2nd First-team All-Pro selection
73	Stefon Diggs	Wide receiver	Minnesota Vikings		▼8		
74	Leighton Vander Esch	Linebacker	Dallas Cowboys		NR		1st Pro Bowl selection; 1st Second-team All-Pro selection; PFWA All-Rookie Team (2018)
75	Gerald McCoy	Defensive tackle	Tampa Bay Buccaneers	Carolina Panthers	NR		
76	Robert Woods	Wide receiver	Los Angeles Rams		NR		
77	Taylor Lewan	Offensive tackle	Tennessee Titans		▲1		3rd Pro Bowl selection
78	Kirk Cousins	Quarterback	Minnesota Vikings		▲16		4 consecutive seasons with 4000+ passing yards; 1st player ever to change teams after 3 consecutive 4000+ passing yards seasons, then post another 4000+ yard season with a new team.
79	Geno Atkins	Defensive tackle	Cincinnati Bengals		▼16		7th Pro Bowl selection
80	Mark Ingram II	Running back	New Orleans Saints	Baltimore Ravens	▼37		
81	Trent Williams	Offensive tackle	Washington Redskins		▼24		7th Pro Bowl selection
82	Bradley Chubb	Outside linebacker	Denver Broncos		NR		PFWA All-Rookie Team (2018)
83	Harrison Smith	Strong safety	Minnesota Vikings		▼37		4th Pro Bowl selection; 1st Second-team All-Pro selection
84	Jarvis Landry	Wide receiver	Cleveland Browns		▼32		4th Pro Bowl selection
85	Frank Clark	Defensive end	Seattle Seahawks	Kansas City Chiefs	NR		
86	Darius Slay	Cornerback	Detroit Lions		▼37		2nd Pro Bowl selection
87	Cam Newton	Quarterback	Carolina Panthers		▼62		
88	Cameron Heyward	Defensive end	Pittsburgh Steelers		▼40		2nd Pro Bowl selection
89	Devin McCourty	Free safety	New England Patriots		NR		Super Bowl champion (3rd time)
90	Julian Edelman	Wide receiver	New England Patriots		NR		Super Bowl champion (3rd time); Super Bowl LIII MVP
91	Andrew Whitworth	Offensive tackle	Los Angeles Rams		▼4		Built Ford Tough Offensive Line of the Year
92	Jurrell Casey	Defensive end	Tennessee Titans		▼26		4th Pro Bowl selection
93	T. J. Watt	Outside linebacker	Pittsburgh Steelers		NR		1st Pro Bowl selection
94	Mitchell Schwartz	Offensive tackle	Kansas City Chiefs		NR		1st First-team All-Pro selection
95	Kyle Fuller	Cornerback	Chicago Bears		NR		1st Pro Bowl selection; 1st First-Team All-Pro selection; NFL interceptions co-leader
96	Carson Wentz	Quarterback	Philadelphia Eagles		▼93		
97	Byron Jones	Cornerback	Dallas Cowboys		NR		1st Pro Bowl selection; 1st Second-team All-Pro selection
98	Tyler Lockett	Wide receiver	Seattle Seahawks		NR		
99	Derrick Henry	Running back	Tennessee Titans		NR		First player to record a 200+ yard and 4+ touchdown game on fewer than 22 carries; Second player in NFL history to record a 99-yard rushing touchdown
100	Eric Weddle	Free safety	Baltimore Ravens	Los Angeles Rams	NR		6th Pro Bowl selection

*Retired before season started
