= Ryan Ramczyk =

American football player (born 1994)

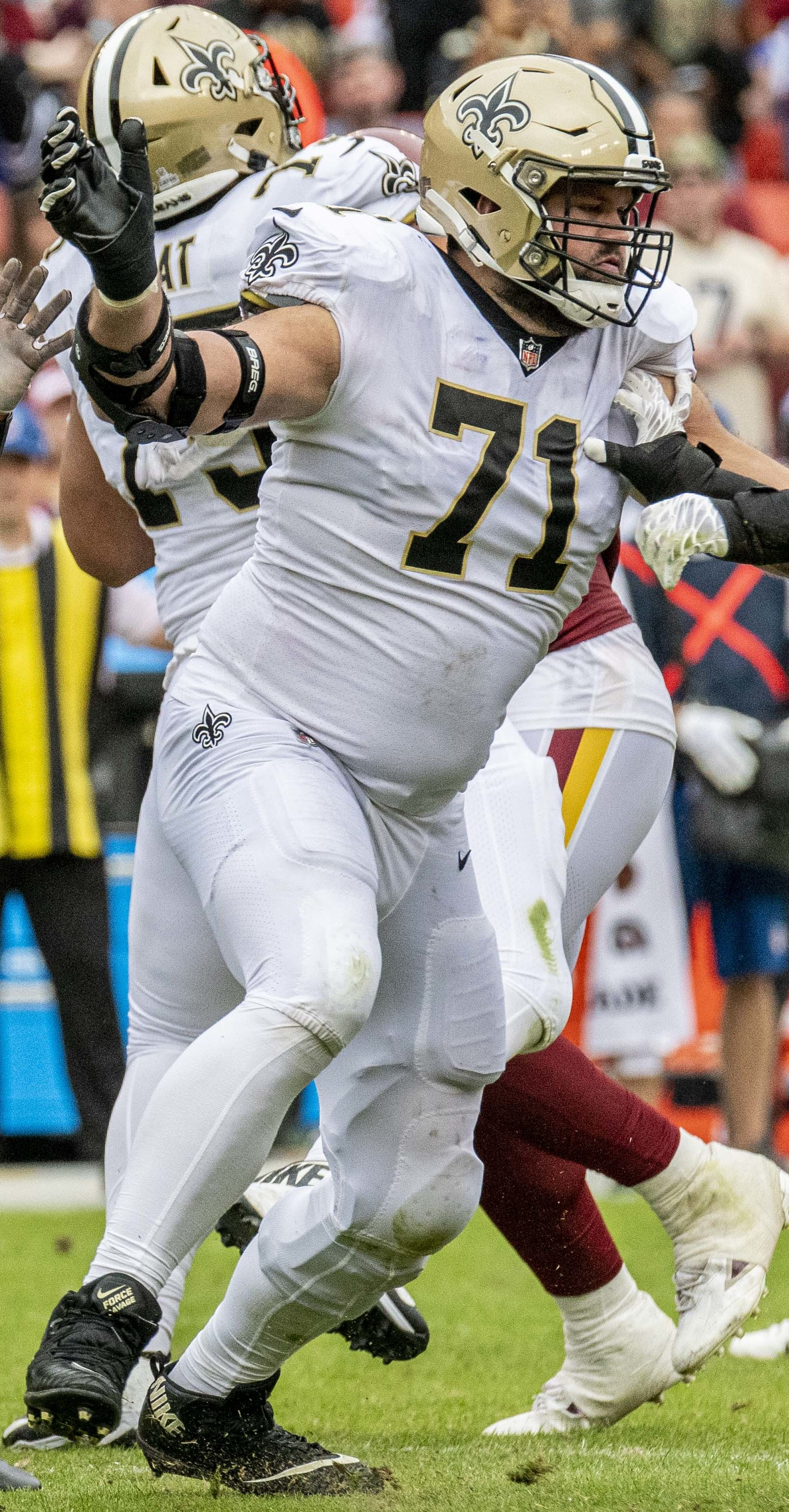
- Ramczyk with the New Orleans Saints in 2021

No. 71
- Position: Offensive tackle

Personal information
- Born: April 22, 1994 (age 32); Stevens Point, Wisconsin, U.S.
- Listed height: 6 ft 6 in (1.98 m)
- Listed weight: 314 lb (142 kg)

Career information
- High school: Stevens Point Area
- College: Wisconsin–Stevens Point (2013–2014); Wisconsin (2015–2016)
- NFL draft: 2017: 1st round, 32nd overall pick

Career history
- New Orleans Saints (2017–2024)

Awards and highlights
- First-team All-Pro (2019); 2× Second-team All-Pro (2018, 2020); PFWA All-Rookie Team (2017); First-team All-American (2016); First-team All-Big Ten (2016); First-team All-WIAC (2014); Second-team All-WIAC (2013)

Career NFL statistics
- Games played: 101
- Games started: 101
- Stats at Pro Football Reference

Ryan Mack Ramczyk (/ˈræmtʃɛk/ RAM-chek; born April 22, 1994) is an American former professional football player who was an offensive tackle for his entire eight-year career with the New Orleans Saints of the National Football League (NFL). He played college football for the Wisconsin–Stevens Point Pointers and Wisconsin Badgers, and was selected by the Saints in the first round of the 2017 NFL draft. A native of Stevens Point, Wisconsin, Ramczyk attended four different schools before transferring to Wisconsin–Madison in 2014, where he became an All-American lineman for the Badgers in the 2016 season.

== Early life ==
Ramczyk attended Stevens Point Area Senior High School in Stevens Point, Wisconsin, where he played high school football. He was a First Team All-State selections by the Wisconsin Football Coaches Association in 2011, and was invited to play in the 2012 WFCA All-Star Game in Oshkosh. He turned down a scholarship offer from Pittsburgh's first-year head coach Paul Chryst and instead enrolled at a near-by Minnesota Division-II school, Winona State.

== College career ==
Leaving Winona State before the football season began, Ramczyk enrolled first at Madison Area Technical College, then Mid-State Technical College in Stevens Point, for one semester each. In 2013, he transferred to the University of Wisconsin–Stevens Point, an NCAA Division III school, where his former high school coach had taken a job on the football staff. In what was technically his freshman season, Ramczyk played in all 10 games and was named Second Team All-Wisconsin Intercollegiate Athletic Conference (WIAC). The following season, he earned First Team All-WIAC honors.

When Paul Chryst became head coach at Wisconsin–Madison, Ramczyk reached out and decided to transfer. After sitting out the 2015 season due to NCAA transfer rules, he was named the starter at the left tackle position for 2016, succeeding Tyler Marz. Ramczyk was named first-team All-Big Ten Conference on November 30, 2016.

== Professional career ==
Ramczyk received an invitation to the NFL Combine, but was only able to perform the bench press due to a hip injury. He also was unable to participate at Wisconsin's Pro Day. He had pre-draft visits with multiple teams, that included the New York Giants, Denver Broncos, Houston Texans, and New England Patriots. Projected to be a first round pick, Ramczyk was ranked the top offensive tackle available in the draft by NFLDraftScout.com, ESPN, Pro Football Focus, and NFL media analyst Bucky Brooks. Ramczyk was ranked the second-best offensive tackle in the draft by Sports Illustrated and NFL media analyst Mike Mayock.

Pre-draft measurables
Height	Weight	Arm length	Hand span	Bench press
6 ft 5 5/8 in (1.97 m)	310 lb (141 kg)	33 3/4 in (0.86 m)	10 7/8 in (0.28 m)	25 reps
All values from NFL Combine

The New Orleans Saints selected Ramczyk in the first round (32nd overall) of the 2017 NFL draft. The pick used to draft Ramczyk was acquired from the Patriots in exchange for Brandin Cooks. Ramczyk made his NFL debut on September 11, 2017, in the season opener against the Minnesota Vikings. Starting at left tackle made him the first Saints' rookie to start at left tackle in a season opener since Jim Dombrowski in 1986. He started the first four games at left tackle in place of the injured Terron Armstead. He moved over to right tackle after Zach Strief was lost for the season with a knee injury. He started 12 games at right tackle, and was named to the PFWA All-Rookie Team.

After the 2018 season, Ramczyk was named an All-Pro for the first time, being selected to the Second Team. Following the 2019 season, he was selected as the First Team All-Pro right tackle, after allowing zero quarterback sacks throughout the 2019 season. He was ranked 82nd by his fellow players on the NFL Top 100 Players of 2020.

In 2020, the Saints exercised Ramczyk's fifth-year option. He started in all 16 games in the 2020 season. He was named as a second team All-Pro for the 2020 season. On June 30, 2021, Ramczyk signed a five-year, $96 million contract extension with the Saints, worth $60 million in guarantees. In the 2021 season, he appeared in and started ten games. In the 2022 season, he appeared in and started 16 games. In the 2023 season, he appeared in and started 12 games.

On July 18, 2024, Ramczyk was placed on the Reserve/Physically Unable to Perform (PUP) list after undergoing knee surgery during the off-season.

On April 17, 2025, Ramczyk announced his retirement from professional football.

=== NFL career statistics ===
Legend
**Bold**	Career high

Year	Team	Games		Offense					
Year	Team	GP	GS	Snaps	Pct	Holding	False start	Decl/Pen	Acpt/Pen
2017	NO	16	16	1,037	**100%**	2	1	**3**	4
2018	NO	15	15	997	**100%**	**3**	0	1	3
2019	NO	16	16	**1,058**	99%	2	2	2	4
2020	NO	16	16	1,039	97%	2	**3**	1	**5**
2021	NO	10	10	653	99%	0	0	0	0
2022	NO	16	16	937	95%	1	**3**	0	4
2023	NO	12	12	785	97%	2	1	1	3
2024	NO	0	0	Did not play due to injury					
Career		101	101	6,506	-	12	10	8	23
