= Harrison Smith =

American football player (born 1989)

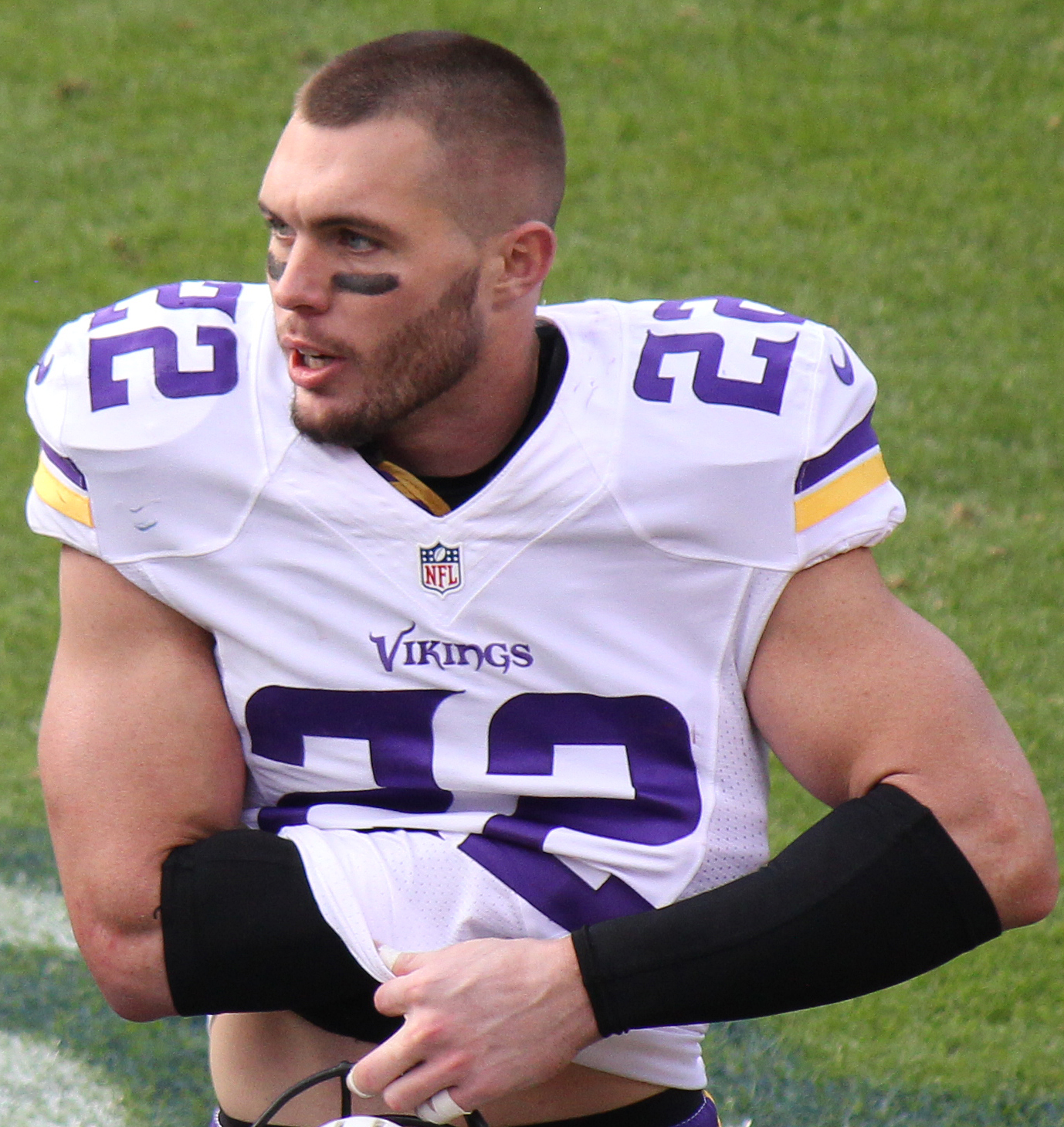
- Smith with the Minnesota Vikings in 2015

No. 22 – Minnesota Vikings
- Position: Safety
- Roster status: Active

Personal information
- Born: February 2, 1989 (age 37); Augusta, Georgia, U.S.
- Listed height: 6 ft 2 in (1.88 m)
- Listed weight: 211 lb (96 kg)

Career information
- High school: Knoxville Catholic (Knoxville, Tennessee)
- College: Notre Dame (2007–2011)
- NFL draft: 2012: 1st round, 29th overall pick

Career history
- Minnesota Vikings (2012–present)

Awards and highlights
- First-team All-Pro (2017); Second-team All-Pro (2018); 6× Pro Bowl (2015–2019, 2021); PFWA All-Rookie Team (2012)

Career NFL statistics as of Week 10, 2026
- Total tackles: 1,199
- Interceptions: 41
- Interception return yards: 525
- Pass deflections: 111
- Forced fumbles: 13
- Fumble recoveries: 10
- Sacks: 22.0
- Defensive touchdowns: 4
- Stats at Pro Football Reference

Harrison Smith (born February 2, 1989), nicknamed "the Hitman", is an American professional football safety for the Minnesota Vikings of the National Football League (NFL). He played college football for the Notre Dame Fighting Irish and was selected by the Vikings in the first round of the 2012 NFL draft with the 29th overall pick.

In 2017, Smith was graded the third-best player in the NFL by Pro Football Focus (PFF). His season grade of 98.8 was also the highest among safeties in PFF history. He was named to his third straight Pro Bowl on January 22, 2018, and was named first-team All-Pro. He followed with a 4th consecutive Pro Bowl in 2019 and second-team All-Pro.

== Early life ==
Smith attended Knoxville Catholic High School in Knoxville, Tennessee. In his senior season, he gained 1,340 yards rushing to go with 19 touchdowns, caught 23 passes for 453 yards and six touchdowns, and also made 61 tackles, two tackles for loss, two interceptions, and caused two fumbles on defense. He was named Gatorade Football Player of the Year in Tennessee in 2006.

In addition to football, Smith also played basketball and ran track. In track, he competed primarily as a jumper. In 2007, he won the state meet in the high jump with a height of 6 ft 4 in (1.93 m) and the decathlon, scoring 6,230 points; he also won a silver medal in the triple jump (46 ft 1 in (14.05 m)) and a bronze in the long jump (21 ft 8.5 in (6.62 m)). He had a career-best leap of 2.03 meters (6.8 ft) in the high jump.

Considered a four-star recruit by Rivals.com, he was listed as the No. 25 athlete in the nation. Many scouts believed he could play offense or defense in college. He chose Notre Dame over numerous Power 5 offers.

== College career ==
After red-shirting as a freshman in 2007, he emerged as a star in 2008. He began his career at linebacker. In his first year, he started 9 games and recorded 57 tackles, which included 8.5 tackles for loss, and 3.5 sacks. As a junior in 2009, he started six games at strong safety, then strongside linebacker for the final six games. He recorded 69 tackles including 6.5 tackles for loss. In 2010, as a senior, he played strong safety where he recorded 93 tackles including a team-high seven interceptions. In 2011, he was accepted to a graduate program at Notre Dame allowing him to play another season. In his final year in 2011, serving as team captain, he played in and started in all 13 games. He recorded 90 tackles including three tackles for loss.

== Professional career ==
=== Pre-draft ===
Coming out of Notre Dame, Smith was projected by the majority of analysts to be a first-round draft selection. He was ranked the second-best strong safety, behind Alabama's Mark Barron, and the 46th best prospect by NFLDraftScout.com. He was invited to attend the 2012 NFL Combine as a free safety and completed the entire workout and every positional drill. Smith was satisfied enough with his combine performance that he chose to only partake in positional drills at Notre Dame's Pro Day. He received positive reviews from analysts and scouts for his size, athletic ability, play recognition, intelligence, tackling ability, reaction time, consistency, and production. He mainly received negative reviews on his man-to-man coverage ability.

Pre-draft measurables
Height	Weight	Arm length	Hand span	Wingspan	40-yard dash	10-yard split	20-yard split	20-yard shuttle	Three-cone drill	Vertical jump	Broad jump	Bench press
6 ft 1 7/8 in (1.88 m)	213 lb (97 kg)	32 5/8 in (0.83 m)	10 1/4 in (0.26 m)	6 ft 4 7/8 in (1.95 m)	4.57 s	1.56 s	2.66 s	4.12 s	6.63 s	34.0 in (0.86 m)	10 ft 2 in (3.10 m)	19 reps
All values from NFL Combine

=== 2012 ===
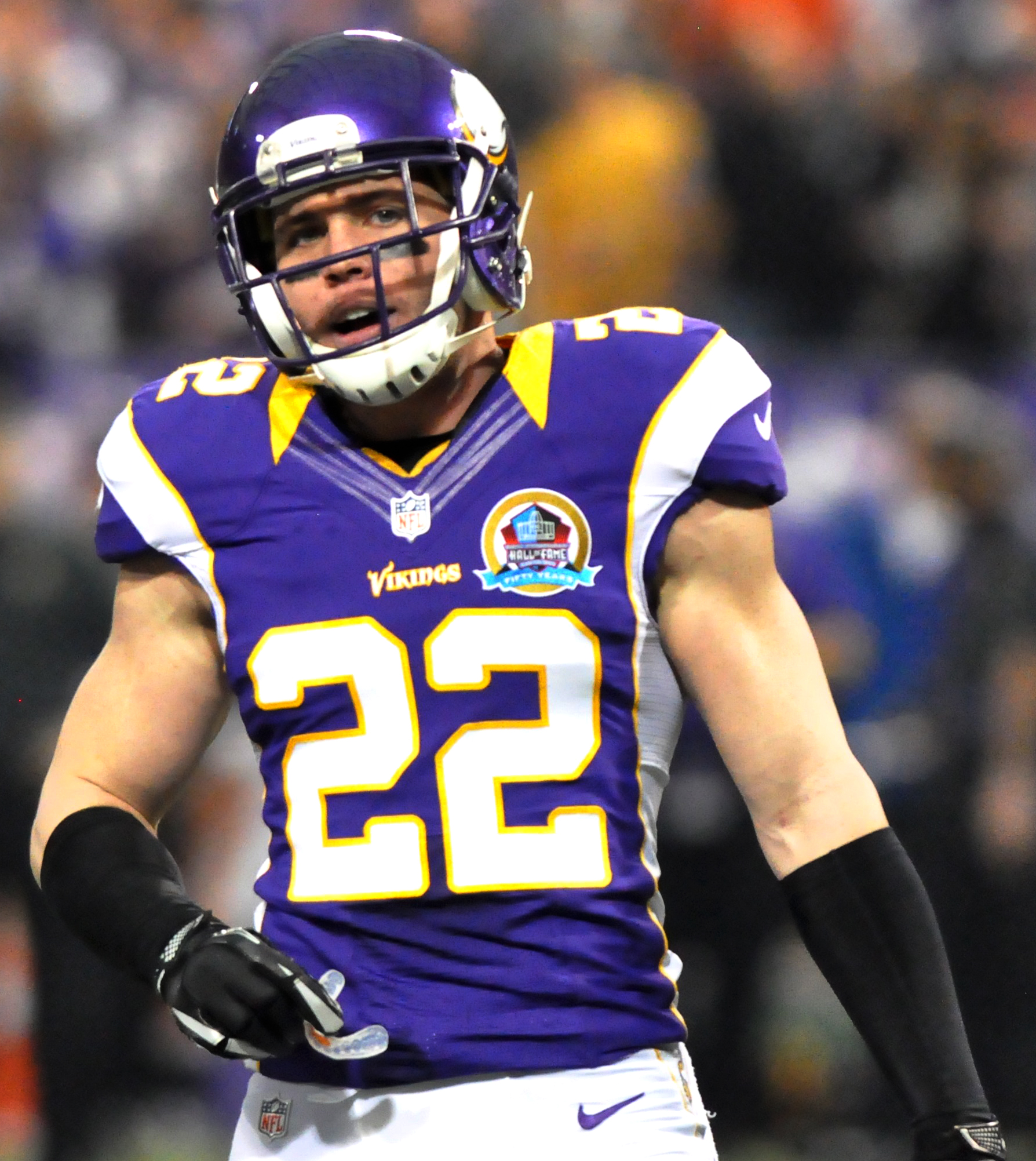
Smith with the Vikings in 2012

On April 26, 2012, the Minnesota Vikings selected Smith in the first round (29th overall) of the 2012 NFL draft after trading up with the Baltimore Ravens. On May 31, 2012, the Vikings signed Smith to a four-year, $7.13 million contract with $5.78 million guaranteed and a signing bonus of $3.63 million.

Entering training camp, Smith competed against Jamarca Sanford and Andrew Sendejo for the starting free safety spot. Smith was named the starting free safety to begin the regular season. He made his professional regular season debut and first career start in the Vikings' season opener against the Jacksonville Jaguars. He finished the 26–23 victory with seven combined tackles. During the Week 5 matchup against the Tennessee Titans, Smith was ejected for moving an official out of the way, but the Vikings still got the 30–7 win. In Week 7 against the Arizona Cardinals, Smith recorded six combined tackles, a pass deflection, and his first career interception off a pass thrown by John Skelton, which he returned for a 31-yard touchdown to seal the Vikings' 21–14 victory. In Week 8 against the Tampa Bay Buccaneers, he made a season-high 13 combined tackles as the Vikings lost 36–17. In Week 13 against the Green Bay Packers, Smith recorded 11 combined tackles and intercepted a pass thrown by Aaron Rodgers as the Vikings lost 23–14. In Week 14 against the Chicago Bears, he recorded seven total tackles and intercepted a pass thrown by Jay Cutler that he returned for a 52-yard touchdown in a 21–14 victory, marking his second touchdown of the season. In Week 15 against the St. Louis Rams, Smith had a season-high nine solo tackles and an assisted tackle during a 36–22 win. In a Week 16 matchup against the Houston Texans, he decided seven solo tackles and made his first career sack on Matt Schaub, as the Vikings won 23–6.

He finished his rookie season with 104 combined tackles, one sack, three interceptions, and two touchdowns. He was named to the PFWA All-Rookie Team.

=== 2013 ===
He returned as the starting free safety the following season. In the season-opener against the Detroit Lions, Smith made a season-high ten combined tackles and deflected a pass as the Vikings lost 34–24. The following week, he recorded eight solo tackles and intercepted Jay Cutler for his first of the season. The Vikings went on to lose to the Bears 31–30. In a Week 3 contest against the Cleveland Browns, Smith racked up five solo tackles and intercepted Brian Hoyer in a 31–27 loss to the Browns. On October 18, 2013, Smith was placed on injured-reserve after suffering an injury to his left foot during a Week 6 loss to the Carolina Panthers. On December 14, 2013, after missing 8 games, Smith was activated to the 53-man roster. The next day, he played in his first game since returning and made eight combined tackles in a 48–30 victory over the Philadelphia Eagles. Smith started only seven games in the 2013 season due to his foot injury and made 58 combined tackles and two interceptions.

=== 2014 ===
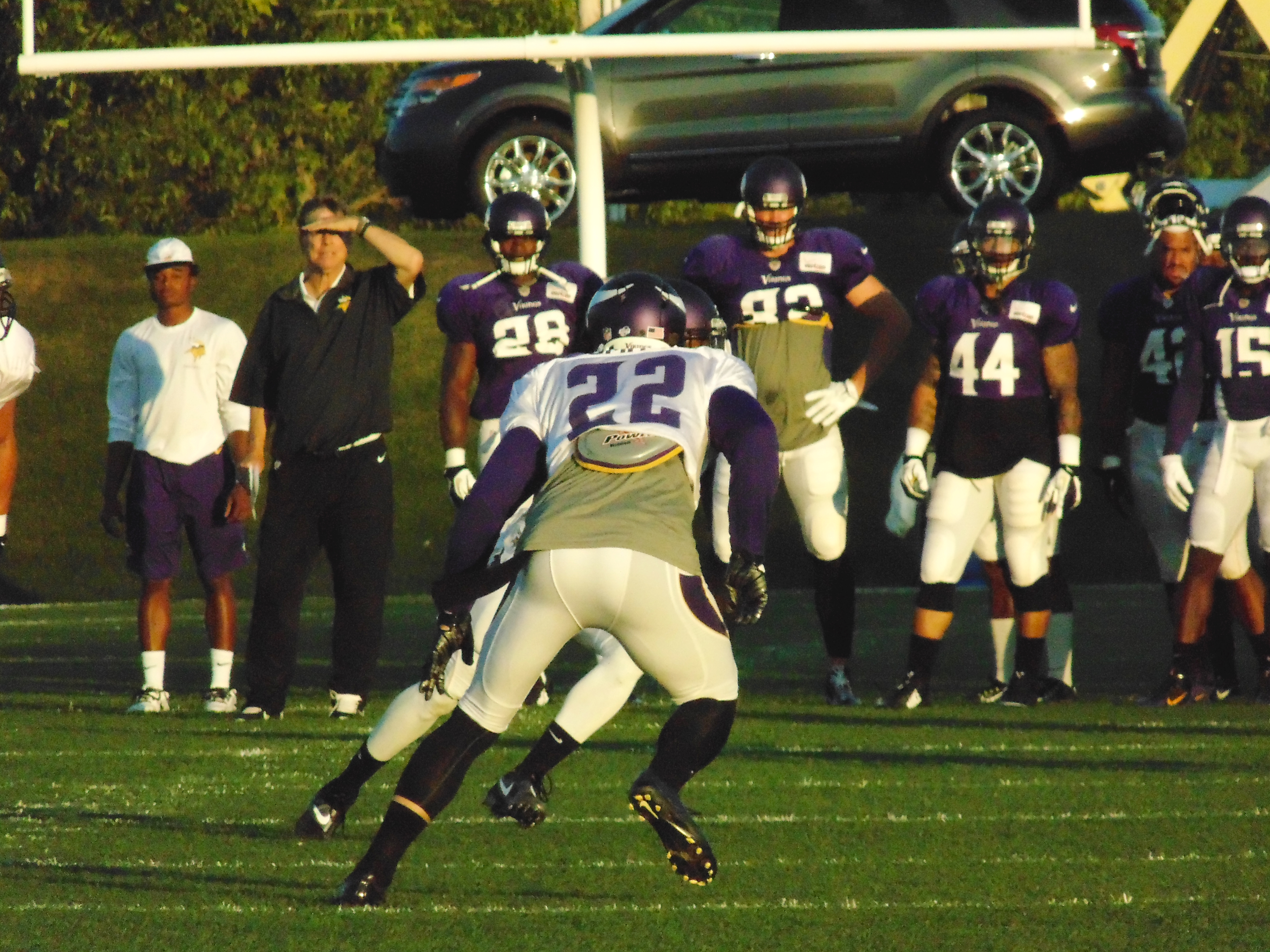
Smith at Vikings training camp in 2014

He resumed as the starting free safety under new head coach Mike Zimmer. In the season-opener against the Rams, Smith made two solo tackles, a pass deflection, a sack, and intercepted a pass by Shaun Hill, returning it for an 81-yard touchdown in a 34–6 victory. In Week 4 against the Atlanta Falcons, Smith intercepted a pass thrown by Matt Ryan in a 41–28 win. The following week, in a Thursday Night Football game against the Packers, Smith intercepted a pass thrown by Matt Flynn in a 42–10 loss. On November 2, 2014, he recorded a season-high ten solo tackles in a 29–26 win over the Washington Redskins. In a Week 11 contest, Smith recorded three solo tackles, a pass deflection, and intercepted a pass thrown by Jay Cutler in a 21–13 loss to the Bears. The next game, he deflected a pass, made five solo tackles, and assisted on five tackles, tying his season-high of ten combined tackles in a 24–21 loss to the Packers. In Week 16 against the Miami Dolphins, Smith intercepted a pass thrown by Ryan Tannehill in a 37–35 loss. He started all 16 games and finished his first year under head coach Mike Zimmer with 92 combined tackles, nine deflected passes, three sacks, five interceptions, and a touchdown.

=== 2015 ===
On May 3, 2015, the Vikings picked up the fifth-year option on his rookie contract that paid him $5.28 million for 2016.

In the season opener, he recorded a season-high nine combined tackles in a 20–3 loss to the San Francisco 49ers. In Week 2, Smith made a season-high six solo tackles in a 26–16 win over the Lions. In Week 4, Smith made three combined tackles and intercepted a pass thrown by Peyton Manning in a 23–20 loss to the Denver Broncos, marking Smith's first interception of the season. In Week 16, Smith racked up five combined tackles and intercepted a pass thrown by Eli Manning that he returned for a 35-yard touchdown in the Vikings' 49–17 win over the New York Giants. He set a Vikings' franchise record with four interceptions returned for touchdowns in a career. Smith started 13 games for the Vikings in the 2015 season and missed Weeks 12, 14, and 15 due to a knee injury. He finished the season with 66 combined tackles, 1.5 sacks, two interceptions, and a touchdown.

On January 31, 2016, Smith played in his first Pro Bowl, as an alternate for the injured Earl Thomas. He was ranked 73rd on the NFL Top 100 Players of 2016.

=== 2016 ===
On June 6, 2016, Smith signed a five-year, $51.25 million contract extension with the Vikings that included $28.57 million guaranteed and a signing bonus of $10 million.

In the Vikings' season-opener against the Titans, he made eight total tackles in a 25–16 victory. On September 25, 2016, Smith recorded seven combined tackles and sacked Cam Newton for his first of the season, in a 22–10 win against the Panthers. In a Week 11 matchup against the Cardinals, Smith recorded a season-high ten combined tackles and sacked Carson Palmer in a 30–24 victory. Smith missed Weeks 14 and 15 with a high ankle sprain that was initially thought to possibly be a season-ending injury that required surgery. On December 24, 2016, he returned in a 38–25 loss to the Packers and made four solo tackles. He finished the season with 91 tackles, two sacks, and two deflected passes in 14 starts. This was the first season in his career he did not record an interception.

On December 20, 2016, the NFL announced that Smith and fellow Vikings Xavier Rhodes and Cordarrelle Patterson had been voted to the 2017 Pro Bowl. This was his second consecutive Pro Bowl but first as a first-team member. He was ranked 74th on the NFL Top 100 Players of 2017.

=== 2017 ===
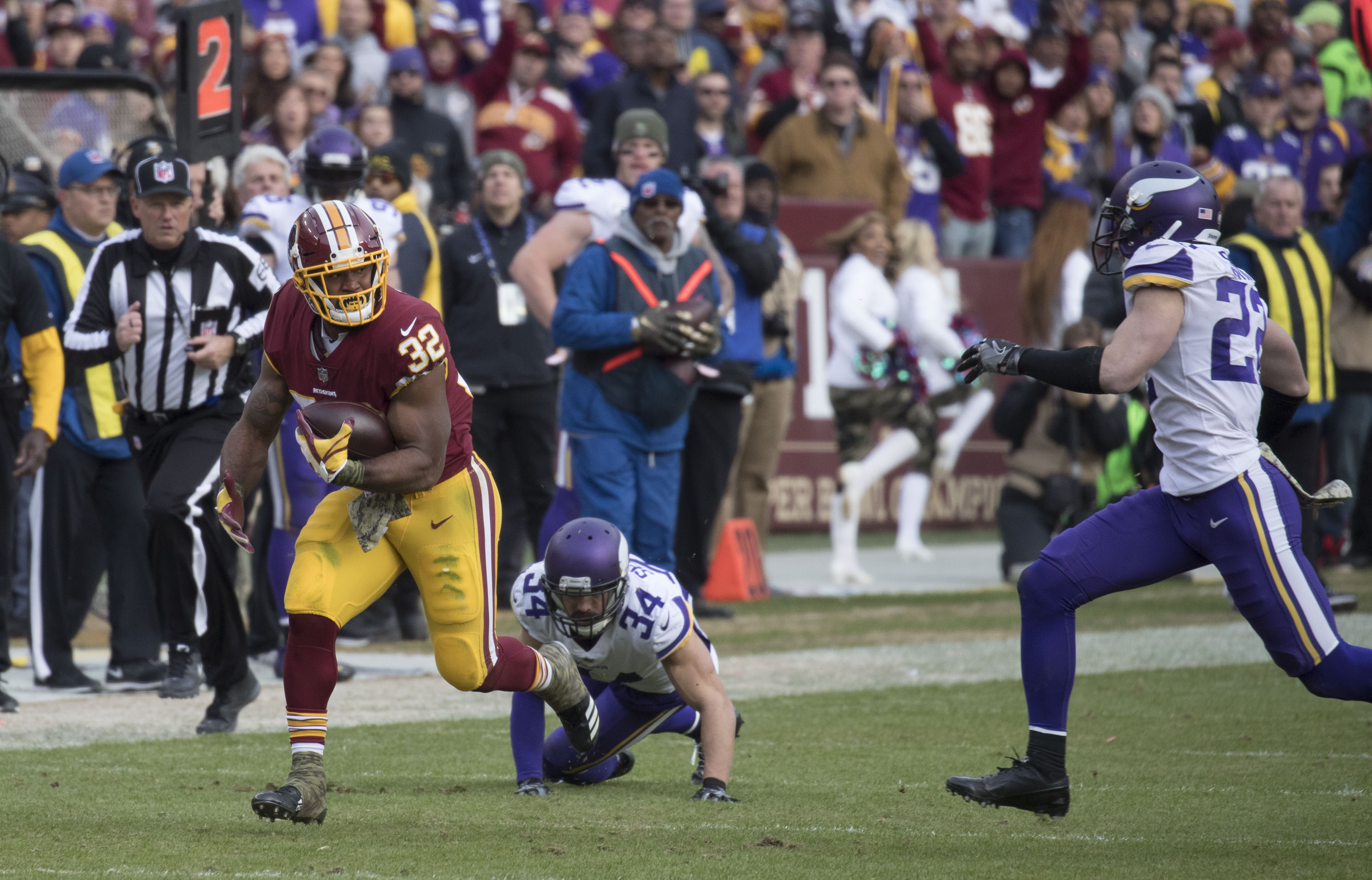
Smith (right) chasing Samaje Perine in 2017

Smith would have what would be considered the best season of his career in 2017. In Week 3, Smith recorded his first interception of the season off a pass thrown by Jameis Winston in a 34–17 win over the Buccaneers. Two weeks later, in a Monday Night Football game against the Bears, Smith intercepted rookie quarterback Mitch Trubisky to seal a 20–17 win. Against the Packers the following week, Smith sacked Brett Hundley 1.5 times and intercepted a pass thrown by Hundley in a 23–10 win. In a rematch with the Packers in Week 16, Smith recorded two more interceptions against Hundley in a 16–0 win, earning him NFC Defensive Player of the Week. On the season, he had 1.5 sacks, 78 total tackles (61 solo), five interceptions, and 12 passes defended in 16 appearances and starts.

Smith was graded the third-best player in the NFL by Pro Football Focus (PFF). His season grade of 98.8 was also the highest among safeties in PFF history. He was named to his third straight Pro Bowl on January 22, 2018, and was named first-team All-Pro. He was also nominated for NFL Defensive Player of the Year. He was ranked 46th on the NFL Top 100 Players of 2018.

=== 2018 ===
In Week 1, Smith intercepted a pass thrown by Jimmy Garoppolo, while also recording a sack and a touchdown-saving fumble recovery off running back Alfred Morris to go along with 7 tackles in the team's 24–16 win over the 49ers, earning him NFC Defensive Player of the Week. In week 5 against the Eagles, Smith had 4 tackles and sealed the game with a big hit late in the 4th quarter to prevent a third-down conversion. In Week 7 against the New York Jets, Smith intercepted a pass thrown by Sam Darnold, while also recording 4 tackles and 2 passes defended in the Vikings' 37–17 win. In the following game against the New Orleans Saints, Smith intercepted a pass thrown by Drew Brees, which was Brees' first interception of the season, but the Vikings would lose 30–20. After recording 84 tackles, three sacks, and three interceptions on the season, Smith was selected to a fourth straight Pro Bowl as well as being named a Second-team All-Pro. Despite Smith's stellar season, however, the Vikings finished second in the NFC North and missed out on the playoffs with an 8–7–1 record. He was ranked 83rd by his fellow players on the NFL Top 100 Players of 2019.

=== 2019 ===
In Week 3 against the Oakland Raiders, Smith recorded his first interception of the season off Derek Carr in the 34–14 win. In Week 14 against the Lions, Smith intercepted a pass thrown by rookie quarterback David Blough that was intended for wide receiver Kenny Golladay in the 20–7 win. In Week 15 against the Los Angeles Chargers, Smith intercepted a pass thrown by Philip Rivers and recovered a fumble forced by Danielle Hunter on running back Melvin Gordon during the 39–10 win. In Week 16 against the Green Bay Packers, Smith forced a fumble on wide receiver Davante Adams that was recovered by teammate Eric Kendricks during a 23–10 loss. He finished the year with 85 tackles, a sack, and three interceptions, while being selected to his fifth straight Pro Bowl.

The Vikings finished second in the NFC North with a 10–6 record, but qualified for the postseason as the NFC's sixth seed. In the Vikings' 26–20 overtime road upset of the Saints in the wild-card round, Smith recorded 11 tackles. In the divisional round, which the Vikings lost 27–10 against the eventual NFC champion 49ers, Smith recorded 8 tackles. He was ranked 64th by his fellow players on the NFL Top 100 Players of 2020.

=== 2020 ===
In Week 3 against the Titans, Smith recorded his first interception of the season off Ryan Tannehill during the 31–30 loss. In Week 4 against the Texans, Smith was ejected after initiating a helmet to helmet hit on tight end Jordan Akins. The Vikings would go on to win 31–23. In Week 9 against the Lions, Smith recorded his second interception of the season off Chase Daniel in the 34–20 win. In Week 10 against the Bears on Monday Night Football, Smith recorded another interception, this time off a pass thrown by Nick Foles during the 19–13 win. In Week 13 against the Jaguars, Smith intercepted a pass thrown by Mike Glennon in overtime to set up the Vikings’ game winning field goal during the 27–24 win. In Week 17 against the Detroit Lions, Smith recorded his fifth interception of the season (tying his single season career high) off a pass thrown by Matthew Stafford during the 37–35 win. In the 2020 season, he made 16 starts and recorded .5 sacks, 89 total tackles (54 solo), five interceptions, and ten passes defended.

=== 2021 ===
On August 29, 2021, Smith signed a four-year contract extension with the Vikings worth $64 million. To start the season, Smith recorded a sack on Joe Burrow in a 27–24 overtime loss to the Cincinnati Bengals. On November 7, 2021, Smith was placed on the Reserve/COVID-19 list after a positive test, which resulted in him missing the following two games as an unvaccinated player. He was activated on November 17, 2021.

After being activated from the Reserve/COVID list, Smith posted either a sack or an interception in three games between Weeks 11–14. This included a sack on Aaron Rodgers in a 34–31 win over the Packers, an interception off Jimmy Garoppolo in a 34–26 loss to the 49ers, and a sack on Ben Roethlisberger in a 36–28 win over the Pittsburgh Steelers.

Despite only recording one interception on the season, Smith recorded a new career high in tackles with 114 and tied his career high in sacks with three. He earned Pro Bowl honors for the sixth time in his career.

=== 2022 ===
To start the 2022 season, Smith intercepted a pass thrown by Aaron Rodgers in a 23–7 win over the Packers. The following week, Smith recorded a season-high 13 tackles, all of which were solo, in a 24–7 loss to the Eagles. From Weeks 6–9, Smith recorded three consecutive games with an interception. After intercepting a pass thrown by Teddy Bridgewater in a 24–16 win over the Dolphins, Smith intercepted a pass thrown by Kyler Murray in a 34–26 win over the Cardinals and followed that with an interception off a pass thrown by Taylor Heinicke in a 20–17 win over the Washington Commanders. In a 27–22 win over the Jets in Week 13, Smith recorded his fifth interception of the season off a pass thrown by Mike White, tying his single-season career high. In 14 appearances and starts in the 2022 season, Smith had 85 total tackles (66 solo), five interceptions, ten passes defended, and one forced fumble. He was ranked 97th by his fellow players on the NFL Top 100 Players of 2023.

=== 2023 ===
In Week 4 of the 2023 season, Smith had three sacks in a 21–13 win over the Panthers. In the 2023 season, he played in 17 games recording 93 tackles, 3 sacks and 3 forced fumbles. He was ranked 93rd by his fellow players on the NFL Top 100 Players of 2024.

=== 2024 ===
In the 2024 season, Smith played in 16 games. He had one sack, 87 tackles, three interceptions, ten passes defended, and one fumble recovery.

=== 2025 ===
On March 12, 2025, Smith re-signed with the Vikings on a one-year, $10.25 million contract. In Week 17, Smith recorded three passes defensed, two tackles for loss, a sack, and an interception in a 23–10 win over the Detroit Lions, earning NFC Defensive Player of the Week. He finished the 2025 season with one sack, 54 tackles, two interceptions, ten passes defended, and one forced fumble.

On March 11, 2026, Smith was released by the Vikings after 14 seasons with the team.

=== 2026 ===
On September 5, 2026, Smith agreed to terms with the Vikings to play a fifteenth season and officially signed his contract on September 8. In Week 7, Smith recorded his 40th career interception from Daniel Jones in the final two minutes of a 16–10 victory over the Indianapolis Colts. The game-sealing pick made Smith the third player in NFL history to record 40-plus interceptions and 20-plus sacks in a career. In Week 10 against the divisional foe Green Bay Packers, Smith notched his 41st career interception when he caught a pass from Jordan Love, who targeted tight end Tucker Kraft in the endzone. This was the seven career interception of Smith against the Packers. He finished the game with two tackles and one pass deflection in the 30–10 win.

== Career statistics ==
Legend
**Bold**	Career high

=== NFL ===
==== Regular season ====
Year	Team	Games		Tackles					Interceptions					Fumbles			
Year	Team	GP	GS	Cmb	Solo	Ast	Sck	PD	Int	Yds	Avg	Lng	TD	FF	FR	Yds	TD
2012	MIN	16	16	98	70	28	1.0	10	3	87	29.0	56	**2**	1	1	0	0
2013	MIN	8	7	56	46	10	0.0	3	2	4	2.0	4	0	0	1	0	0
2014	MIN	16	16	91	71	20	**3.0**	9	**5**	**150**	**30.0**	**81**	1	1	0	0	0
2015	MIN	13	13	66	49	17	1.5	3	2	35	17.5	35	1	1	0	0	0
2016	MIN	14	14	91	69	22	2.0	2	0	0	-	-	0	0	1	0	0
2017	MIN	16	16	78	61	17	1.5	**12**	**5**	42	8.4	19	0	0	0	0	0
2018	MIN	16	16	84	67	17	**3.0**	6	3	66	22.0	52	0	1	**2**	0	0
2019	MIN	15	15	85	65	20	1.0	11	3	13	4.3	13	0	**3**	**2**	0	0
2020	MIN	16	16	89	54	**35**	0.5	10	**5**	33	6.6	16	0	0	0	0	0
2021	MIN	15	15	**114**	**83**	31	**3.0**	7	1	10	10.0	10	0	1	0	0	0
2022	MIN	14	14	85	66	19	0.0	10	**5**	58	11.6	35	0	1	0	0	0
2023	MIN	17	17	93	60	33	**3.0**	3	0	0	-	-	0	**3**	0	0	0
2024	MIN	16	16	87	56	31	1.0	10	3	0	0.0	0	0	0	1	0	0
2025	MIN	15	12	54	37	17	1.0	10	2	12	6.0	11	0	1	1	-1	0
2026	MIN	9	0	19	10	9	0.5	5	2	15	7.5	15	0	0	0	0	0
Career		216	203	1,199	869	330	22.0	111	41	525	12.8	81	4	13	10	-1	0

==== Postseason ====
Year	Team	Games		Tackles					Interceptions					Fumbles			
Year	Team	GP	GS	Cmb	Solo	Ast	Sck	PD	Int	Yds	Avg	Lng	TD	FF	FR	Yds	TD
2012	MIN	1	1	8	7	1	0.0	**1**	0	0	-	-	0	0	0	0	0
2015	MIN	1	1	3	2	1	0.0	**1**	0	0	-	-	0	0	0	0	0
2017	MIN	2	2	13	**12**	1	**1.0**	0	0	0	-	-	0	0	0	0	0
2019	MIN	2	2	**19**	**12**	**7**	0.0	0	0	0	-	-	0	0	0	0	0
2022	MIN	1	1	3	3	0	0.0	0	0	0	-	-	0	0	0	0	0
2024	MIN	1	1	9	3	6	0.0	**1**	0	0	-	-	0	0	0	0	0
Career		8	8	55	39	16	1.0	3	0	0	-	-	0	0	0	0	0

=== College ===
Season	Team	Games		Tackles				Interceptions						Fumbles		
Season	Team	GP	GS	Cmb	Solo	Ast	Sck	PD	Int	Yds	Avg	Lng	TD	FF	FR	Yds
2007	Notre Dame	Redshirt														
2008	Notre Dame	13	9	57	39	18	**3.5**	7	0	0	0.0	0	0	0	0	0
2009	Notre Dame	12	12	69	39	30	0.0	4	0	0	0.0	0	0	**1**	0	0
2010	Notre Dame	13	13	**93**	**56**	**37**	0.0	7	**7**	**54**	**7.7**	**23**	0	0	0	0
2011	Notre Dame	13	13	90	53	**37**	0.0	**10**	0	0	0.0	0	0	**1**	0	0
Totals		51	47	309	187	122	3.5	28	7	54	7.7	23	0	2.0	0	0

== Personal life ==
Smith's cousin is The Parent Trap (1998) actress Elaine Hendrix.
