= Michael Thomas (wide receiver, born 1993) =

American football player (born 1993)

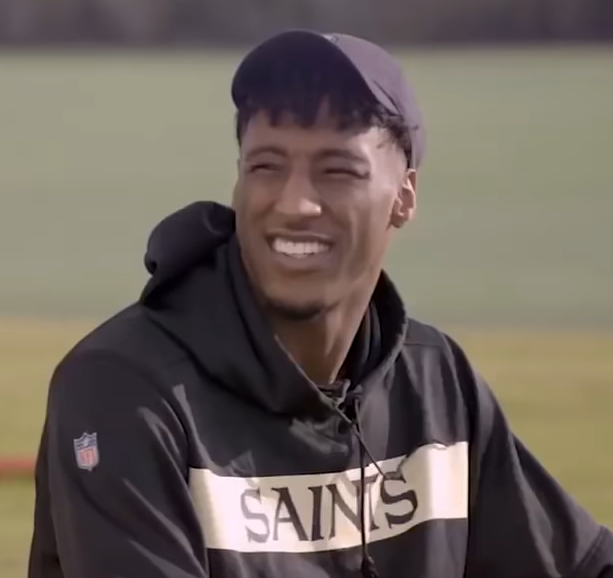
- Thomas with the New Orleans Saints in 2018

No. 13
- Position: Wide receiver

Personal information
- Born: March 3, 1993 (age 33); Los Angeles, California, U.S.
- Listed height: 6 ft 3 in (1.91 m)
- Listed weight: 212 lb (96 kg)

Career information
- High school: Taft (Woodland Hills, California)
- College: Ohio State (2012–2015)
- NFL draft: 2016: 2nd round, 47th overall pick

Career history
- New Orleans Saints (2016–2023)

Awards and highlights
- NFL Offensive Player of the Year (2019); 2× First-team All-Pro (2018, 2019); 3× Pro Bowl (2017–2019); 2× NFL receptions leader (2018, 2019); NFL receiving yards leader (2019); PFWA All-Rookie Team (2016); CFP national champion (2014); Third-team All-Big Ten (2015); NFL record: Most receptions in a season: 149 (2019)

Career NFL statistics
- Receptions: 565
- Receiving yards: 6,569
- Receiving touchdowns: 36
- Stats at Pro Football Reference

Michael William Thomas Jr. (born March 3, 1993) is an American former professional football wide receiver who played the National Football League (NFL) for eight seasons with the New Orleans Saints. He played college football for the Ohio State Buckeyes, where he was a member of the team that won the 2015 College Football Playoff National Championship and received third-team All-Big Ten honors the following year. Thomas was selected by the Saints in the second round of the 2016 NFL draft.

In 2019, Thomas set the NFL single season record for receptions, as well as leading the league in receiving yards, earning him NFL Offensive Player of the Year. He also led the league in receptions in 2018 and received three consecutive Pro Bowl and two consecutive All-Pro selections. Thomas struggled with injuries following the 2019 season, leading to his release in 2024.

== Early life ==
Thomas attended Taft High School in Woodland Hills, California. As a senior, he had 86 receptions for a state-leading 1,656 yards and 21 touchdowns for the Toreadors football team. Thomas was ranked by Rivals.com as a four-star recruit. He committed to Ohio State University to play college football. Thomas attended Fork Union Military Academy for a year after high school and was roommates with fellow Ohio State teammate Cardale Jones.

== College career ==
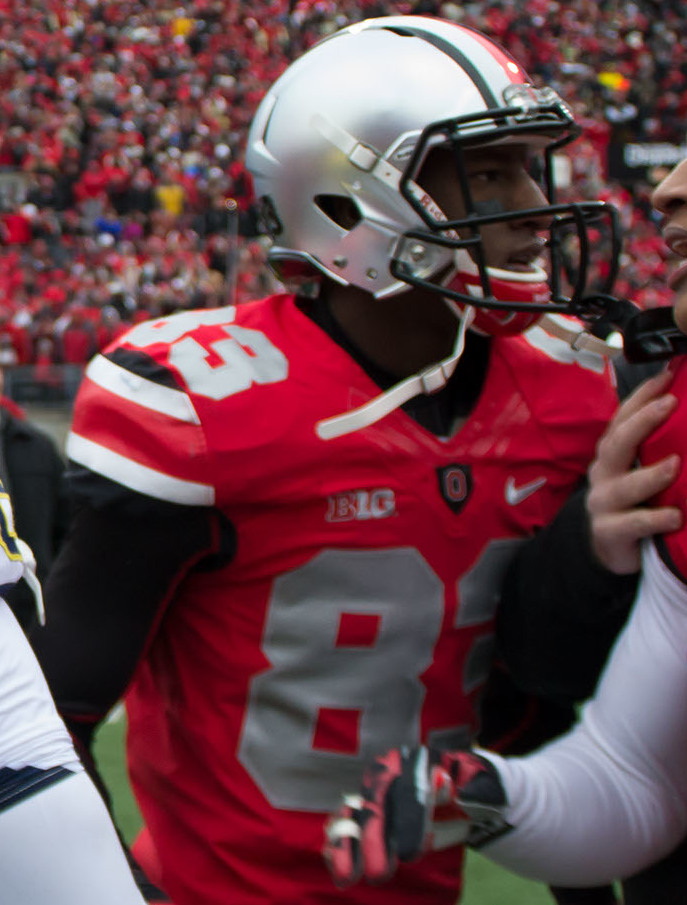
Thomas in 2012

Thomas played in 11 games as a true freshman in 2012. He finished the season with three receptions for 22 yards.

As a sophomore in 2013, Thomas was redshirted.

Thomas entered his redshirt sophomore season in 2014 as a backup, but eventually took over as a starting wide receiver. He finished the season leading the team in receptions with 54 for 799 yards and nine touchdowns. In the National Semifinals against Alabama in the Sugar Bowl, Thomas had seven receptions for 66 yards and a touchdown in the victory.

During the 2015 College Football Playoff National Championship victory over Oregon, Thomas had four receptions for 53 yards. In the 2015 season, he had 56 receptions for 781 yards and nine touchdowns. On January 5, 2016, Thomas announced his intentions to enter the 2016 NFL draft.

== Professional career ==
Pre-draft measurables
| Height | Weight | Arm length | Hand span | Wingspan | 40-yard dash | 10-yard split | 20-yard split | 20-yard shuttle | Three-cone drill | Vertical jump | Broad jump | Bench press |
|---|---|---|---|---|---|---|---|---|---|---|---|---|
| 6 ft 2 3/4 in (1.90 m) | 212 lb (96 kg) | 32 1/8 in (0.82 m) | 10 1/2 in (0.27 m) | 6 ft 6 1/4 in (1.99 m) | 4.57 s | 1.53 s | 2.63 s | 4.13 s | 6.80 s | 35 in (0.89 m) | 10 ft 6 in (3.20 m) | 18 reps |
All values from NFL Combine

=== 2016 ===
Thomas was selected by the New Orleans Saints in the second round with the 47th overall pick in the 2016 NFL Draft. He was the sixth wide receiver to be selected that year.

On May 9, 2016, the Saints signed Thomas to a four-year, $5.11 million contract with $2.60 million guaranteed and a signing bonus of $1.92 million.

The Saints named Thomas one of their starting wide receivers, alongside Brandin Cooks, for the season opener against the Oakland Raiders. Thomas finished his first NFL start with six receptions for 58 yards. Two weeks later, Thomas caught his first NFL touchdown on a three-yard pass from Drew Brees during the second quarter of a Monday Night Football matchup against the Atlanta Falcons. Thomas finished the 45–32 loss with seven catches for 71 yards and the aforementioned touchdown. On October 23, 2016, he had his first game with over 100 receiving yards after finishing with a season-high 10 receptions for 130 yards in a 27–21 loss to the Kansas City Chiefs.

During Week 9 against the San Francisco 49ers, Thomas recorded five receptions for 73 yards and two touchdowns in the 41–23 road victory. Three weeks later, he caught nine passes for 108 yards and tied his season-high of two touchdown receptions in a 49–21 victory over the Los Angeles Rams. In the regular season finale against the Falcons, Thomas had 10 receptions for 156 yards and a touchdown during the 38–32 loss.

During his rookie season, Thomas set franchise records for a rookie in receptions with 92, receiving yards with 1,137, and touchdowns with nine. He was named to the PFWA All-Rookie Team.

=== 2017 ===
In his second season, Thomas came into the year as the Saints' #1-receiver after Brandin Cooks was traded to the New England Patriots. Thomas was named to his first Pro Bowl. He finished the season with 104 receptions for 1,245 yards and five touchdowns. His 104 receptions finished third in the NFL, and his 196 receptions in his first two seasons in the league were the most in NFL history, passing Jarvis Landry's 194 set in 2015. Thomas appeared in his first career playoff game on January 7, 2018, against the division rival Carolina Panthers in the Wild Card Round. He recorded eight receptions for 131 yards during the 31–26 victory. During the Divisional Round against the Minnesota Vikings, Thomas had seven receptions for 85 yards and two touchdowns in the 29–24 road loss. He was ranked 81st by his fellow players on the NFL Top 100 Players of 2018.

=== 2018 ===
In the season-opener against the Tampa Bay Buccaneers, Thomas caught a franchise-record 16 passes for 180 yards and a touchdown, breaking the century mark for the fourth time in his career and eclipsing 200 career receptions. The 16 receptions were the most by any player for the 2018 season for a single game. The next week, he scored twice more with 89 yards on 12 catches in a 21–18 win over the Cleveland Browns. With his 12 receptions, Thomas set an NFL record for the most catches in the first two games with 28, the record previously held by Andre Rison with 26 set in 1994. In Week 3, he added 10 receptions for 129 yards against the Falcons. His 38 receptions through the first three games were the most in NFL history.

Prior to a Week 9 matchup against the Rams, Thomas engaged in an online feud with ex-Saints receiver Brandin Cooks following his departure. The Rams entered the matchup with an undefeated 8–0 record. During the game; Thomas had 12 catches for a franchise-record 211 yards, including a 72-yard touchdown. Upon scoring, Thomas paid tribute to former Saints wide receiver Joe Horn by recreating his famous cell phone touchdown celebration in an effort to simultaneously taunt the Rams, which drew a 15-yard unsportsmanlike conduct penalty and he was later fined $30,000 by the league office. Horn said he "teared up" at the gesture and bought Thomas' jersey, despite this; numerous players on the Rams sideline were enraged by the gesture; notably Rams' then-cornerback Marcus Peters. Thomas was named National Football Conference (NFC) Offensive Player of the Week for his spectacular performance.

In Week 13 against the Dallas Cowboys, Thomas recorded his 90th catch of the season, joining Odell Beckham Jr. as the only players in NFL history to record at least 90 receptions in their first three seasons.

Thomas finished the season with 125 receptions for 1,405 yards and nine touchdowns. He led the league in receptions and finished sixth in the league in receiving yards. Thomas also set the Saints franchise record in receiving yards, passing Joe Horn's 1,399 yards set in 2004. Thomas was named to his second straight Pro Bowl and was named first-team All-Pro. He was ranked 13th by his fellow players on the NFL Top 100 Players of 2019.

Thomas and the Saints later rematched against the Rams in the controversial NFC Championship Game. Thomas had four receptions for 36 yards as the Saints' comeback was cut short by a controversial hit during the fourth quarter. During a critical play in overtime, the score was tied 23–23 as Brees attempted to target Thomas for a crucial pass to keep their drive alive. Brees was charged by Rams' defensive end Dante Fowler as he threw the ball to Thomas, who was promptly beaten to the catch by Rams' safety John Johnson who mockingly celebrated Thomas' "horse-saddle" as a retaliatory action for his gesture earlier in the season. The Rams managed to kick a field goal to win the game. Thomas later attacked the Rams and the no-call during his postgame interview telling reporters; "As Far as next year? we're going back, and we're coming back with revenge for sure. I saw exactly what you saw, that was pass interference".

=== 2019 ===
On July 31, 2019, Thomas signed a five-year, $100 million contract extension with $61 million guaranteed with the Saints. This made Thomas the highest-paid wide receiver in the NFL at the time.

During the season-opener against the Houston Texans on Monday Night Football, Thomas caught 10 passes for 123 yards in the narrow 30–28 victory. The Rams and Saints would meet again in Los Angeles during the Week 2 matchup which saw Thomas perform better in comparison to the prior matchup, as he had 10 receptions for 89 yards as the Rams blew out the Saints 27–9. Thomas rebounded strongly the following week against the Seattle Seahawks, as he caught five passes for 54 yards and scored his first touchdown of the season in the 33–27 road victory.

During Week 5 against the Buccaneers, Thomas recorded 11 receptions for 182 yards and two touchdowns as the Saints won 31–24. Two weeks later against the Chicago Bears, he caught nine passes for 131 yards in the 36–25 road victory. In the next game against the Arizona Cardinals, Thomas had 11 receptions for 112 yards and a touchdown in the 31–9 victory. During Week 10 against the Falcons, he finished with a season-high 13 receptions for 152 yards as the Saints lost 26–9. In the next game against the Buccaneers, Thomas caught eight passes for 114 yards and a touchdown during the 34–17 victory. He was named the NFC Offensive Player of the Month for his play in November.

During Week 14 against the 49ers, Thomas caught 11 passes for 134 yards and a touchdown in the narrow 48–46 loss. During the game, he set a new Saints' record for receiving yards in a single season. In the next game against the Indianapolis Colts on Monday Night Football, Thomas caught 12 passes for 128 yards and a touchdown during the 34–7 victory. The following week against the Tennessee Titans, he broke the single-season receptions record formerly held by Marvin Harrison with his 144th catch of the season, followed by a one-yard touchdown catch for his 145th, while the Saints won on the road by a score of 38–28.

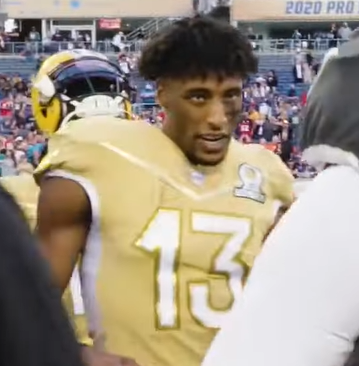
Thomas at the 2020 Pro Bowl

Thomas finished the season with an NFL record 149 receptions for 1,725 yards and nine touchdowns. In the NFC Wild Card Round against the Vikings, Thomas had seven receptions for 70 yards during the 26–20 overtime loss. He was named to the Pro Bowl and earned First Team All-Pro honors. On February 1, 2020, Thomas was awarded AP Offensive Player of the Year for his performance during the 2019 season, becoming the first wide receiver to win the award since Jerry Rice in 1993. Thomas was ranked fifth by his fellow players on the NFL Top 100 Players of 2020.

=== 2020 ===
In the season-opener against the Buccaneers, Thomas recorded three receptions for 17 yards before exiting the eventual 34–23 victory with a high ankle sprain. He was set to return to action in Week 5 against the Los Angeles Chargers on Monday Night Football, but on October 11, Thomas was declared inactive for the game by the Saints after punching teammate C. J. Gardner-Johnson in practice. Thomas was also fined $58,823 by the team for the incident.

Thomas returned from injury in Week 9 against the Buccaneers on Sunday Night Football. During the game, Thomas led the team with five receptions for 51 yards during the 38–3 victory. Two weeks later against the Falcons, he had his first 100-yard receiving game of the season, recording nine receptions for 104 yards during the 24–9 victory. Thomas was placed on injured reserve on December 19 due to the lingering ankle injury. He was activated on January 9, 2021.

In the Wild Card Round against the Bears, Thomas had five receptions for 73 yards and his first touchdown of the season during the 21–9 victory. He was ranked 72nd by his fellow players on the NFL Top 100 Players of 2021.

=== 2021 ===
On July 23, 2021, it was revealed that Thomas had undergone ankle surgery in the past month. He was placed on the PUP list three days later. On November 3, it was announced Thomas would not return during the 2021 season due to a setback with his ankle injury.

=== 2022 ===
Thomas returned from injury in the season-opener against the Falcons, where he caught five passes for 57 yards and two touchdowns during the narrow 27–26 comeback victory. He recorded another productive game in the next game with six receptions for 65 yards and a touchdown in a 20–10 loss to the Buccaneers. The following week against the Panthers, Thomas exited the game early with a foot injury and went on to miss multiple weeks before being placed on injured reserve on November 3, 2022, prematurely ending his season.

=== 2023 ===
On January 7, 2023, Thomas and the Saints agreed to restructure his contract which saw his base salary in 2023 drop from $15.5 million to $1.165 million.

During Week 11 against the Minnesota Vikings, Thomas suffered an unknown knee injury after taking a hard hit on the first offensive play and was sidelined for the rest of the game. The Saints put him on injured reserve on November 21. In the 2023 season, Thomas appeared in 10 games (seven starts), finishing with 39 receptions for 448 yards and a touchdown, which came in Week 7 against the Jaguars.

On March 13, 2024, Thomas was released by the Saints. In August 2024, Thomas was suspended one game by the NFL for violating the personal conduct policy, relating to a legal incident he had in November 2023.

== Career statistics ==
Legend
| | AP NFL Offensive Player of the Year |
| | NFL record |
| | Led the league |
| **Bold** | Career high |

=== NFL ===
==== Regular season ====
| Year | Team | Games | | Receiving | | | | | Rushing | | | | | Fumbles | |
| Year | Team | GP | GS | Rec | Yds | Avg | Lng | TD | Att | Yds | Avg | Lng | TD | Fum | Lost |
|---|---|---|---|---|---|---|---|---|---|---|---|---|---|---|---|
| 2016 | NO | 15 | 12 | 92 | 1,137 | **12.4** | 46 | **9** | — | — | — | — | — | **2** | **2** |
| 2017 | NO | 16 | 14 | 104 | 1,245 | 12.0 | 43 | 5 | — | — | — | — | — | 0 | 0 |
| 2018 | NO | 16 | 16 | 125 | 1,405 | 11.2 | **72T** | **9** | — | — | — | — | — | **2** | **2** |
| 2019 | NO | 16 | 15 | **149** | **1,725** | 11.6 | 49 | **9** | **1** | -9 | -9.0 | -9 | 0 | 1 | 0 |
| 2020 | NO | 7 | 5 | 40 | 438 | 11.0 | 24 | 0 | **1** | **1** | **1.0** | **1** | 0 | 0 | 0 |
| 2021 | NO | 0 | 0 | Did not play due to injury | | | | | | | | | | | |
| 2022 | NO | 3 | 3 | 16 | 171 | 10.7 | 21 | 3 | — | — | — | — | — | 0 | 0 |
| 2023 | NO | 10 | 7 | 39 | 448 | 11.5 | 31 | 1 | — | — | — | — | — | 0 | 0 |
| Total | | 83 | 72 | 565 | 6,569 | 11.6 | 72T | 36 | 2 | -8 | -4.0 | 1 | 0 | 5 | 4 |

==== Postseason ====
| Year | Team | Games | | Receiving | | | | | Rushing | | | | | Fumbles | |
| Year | Team | GP | GS | Rec | Yds | Avg | Lng | TD | Att | Yds | Avg | Lng | TD | Fum | Lost |
|---|---|---|---|---|---|---|---|---|---|---|---|---|---|---|---|
| 2017 | NO | 2 | 2 | 15 | **216** | 14.4 | **46** | **2** | — | — | — | — | — | 0 | 0 |
| 2018 | NO | 2 | 2 | **16** | 207 | 12.9 | 42 | 1 | — | — | — | — | — | 0 | 0 |
| 2019 | NO | 1 | 1 | 7 | 70 | 10.0 | 20 | 0 | — | — | — | — | — | 0 | 0 |
| 2020 | NO | 2 | 1 | 5 | 73 | **14.6** | 38 | 1 | — | — | — | — | — | 0 | 0 |
| Total | | 7 | 6 | 43 | 566 | 13.2 | 46 | 4 | 0 | 0 | 0.0 | 0 | 0 | 0 | 0 |

=== College ===
| Season | Team | GP | Receiving | | | | |
| Season | Team | GP | Rec | Yds | Avg | Lng | TD |
|---|---|---|---|---|---|---|---|
| 2012 | Ohio State | 11 | 3 | 22 | 7.3 | 11 | 0 |
| 2013 | Ohio State | 0 | Redshirt | | | | |
| 2014 | Ohio State | 15 | 54 | **799** | **14.8** | **79** | **9** |
| 2015 | Ohio State | 13 | **56** | 781 | 13.9 | 50 | **9** |
| Total | | 39 | 113 | 1,602 | 14.2 | 79 | 18 |

== Career highlights ==
=== Awards and honors ===
NFL

- NFL Offensive Player of the Year (2019)
- 2× First-team All-Pro (2018, 2019)
- 3× Pro Bowl (2017–2019)
- 2× NFL receptions leader (2018, 2019)
- NFL receiving yards leader (2019)
- PFWA All-Rookie Team (2016)
- 4× NFL Top 100 — 81st (2018), 13th (2019), 5th (2020), 72nd (2021)

College

- CFP national champion (2014)
- Fiesta Bowl champion (2015)
- Sugar Bowl champion (2014)
- Big Ten champion (2014)
- Third-team All-Big Ten (2015)
- Big Ten All-Honorable Mention (2014)

=== Records ===
==== NFL records ====
- Most receptions by a player through his first five seasons: 510
- Most receptions by a player in a single season: 149
- Most receptions by a player in a single season including playoffs: 156
- Most consecutive games with 4+ receptions: 43
- Most seasons, 120+ pass receptions: 2 (2018–2019) (tied with 2 others)
- Most seasons, 125+ pass receptions: 2 (2018–2019) (tied with 1 other)
- Fewest games to record 300 career receptions: 45 (2016–2018) (tied with one other)
- Fewest games to record 400 career receptions: 56 (2016–2019)
- Fewest games to record 500 career receptions: 69 (2016–2020)

==== Saints franchise records ====
- Most receptions in a game: 16 (September 9, 2018, vs Tampa Bay Buccaneers)
- Most receiving yards in a game: 211 (November 4, 2018, vs Los Angeles Rams)
- Most receptions in a season by a rookie: 92 (2016)
- Most receiving yards in a season by a rookie: 1,137 (2016)
- Most receiving touchdowns in a season by a rookie: 9 (2016)
- Most receptions in a season: 149 (2019)
- Most receiving yards in a season: 1,725 (2019)

== Personal life ==
Thomas is the nephew of former NFL wide receiver Keyshawn Johnson.

Thomas is a Christian.

=== Legal troubles ===
On November 10, 2023, Thomas was arrested on misdemeanor charges of simple battery and criminal mischief. It was revealed that Thomas was involved in an altercation with a man doing construction work and allegedly threw a brick at the windshield of a truck, leading to his arrest. He was released from jail that same night.
