= Von Miller =

American football player (born 1989)

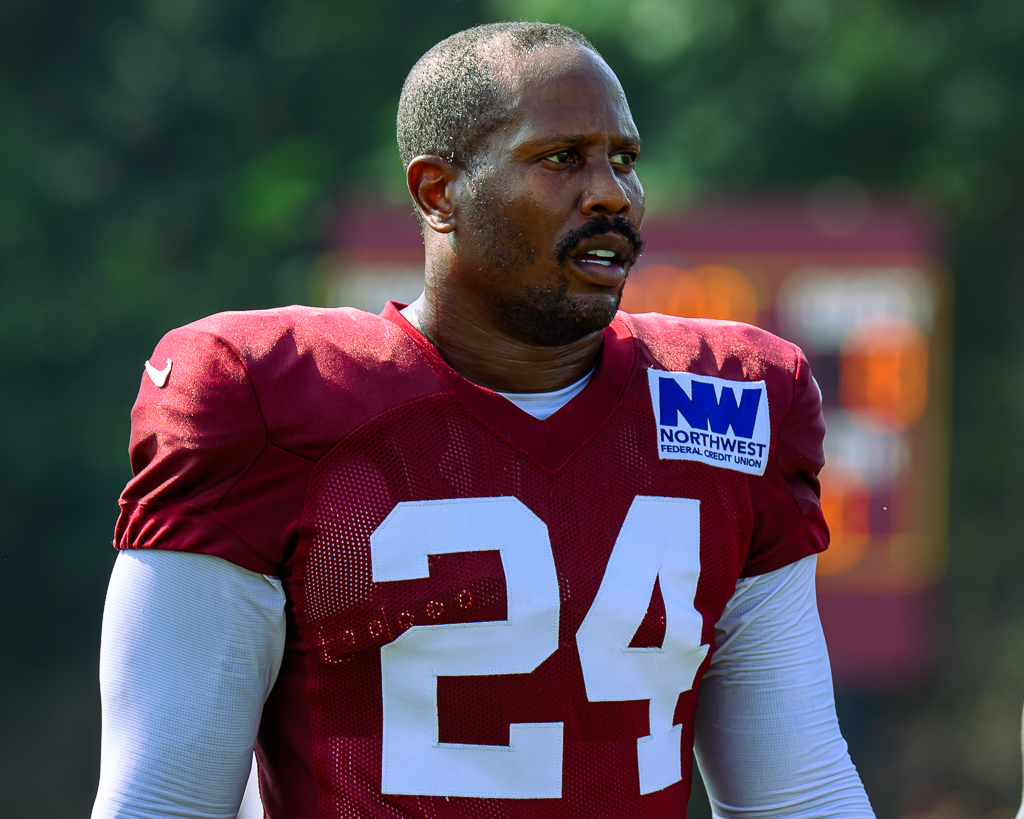
- Miller with the Washington Commanders in 2025

No. 40 – Dallas Cowboys
- Position: Outside linebacker
- Roster status: Active

Personal information
- Born: March 26, 1989 (age 37); DeSoto, Texas, U.S.
- Listed height: 6 ft 3 in (1.91 m)
- Listed weight: 245 lb (111 kg)

Career information
- High school: DeSoto
- College: Texas A&M (2007–2010)
- NFL draft: 2011: 1st round, 2nd overall pick

Career history
- Denver Broncos (2011–2021); Los Angeles Rams (2021); Buffalo Bills (2022–2024); Washington Commanders (2025); Dallas Cowboys (2026–present)

Awards and highlights
- 2× Super Bowl champion (50, LVI); Super Bowl MVP (50); NFL Defensive Rookie of the Year (2011); 3× First-team All-Pro (2012, 2015, 2016); 4× Second-team All-Pro (2011, 2014, 2017, 2018); 8× Pro Bowl (2011, 2012, 2014–2019); NFL 2010s All-Decade Team; Butkus Award (pro) (2012); PFWA All-Rookie Team (2011); Butkus Award (college) (2010); Jack Lambert Trophy (2010); Consensus All-American (2010); First-team All-American (2009); NCAA sacks leader (2009); 2× first-team All-Big 12 (2009, 2010); NFL record: Most career sacks in the Super Bowl: 4.5 (tied) (Note: With Charles Haley)

Career NFL statistics as of Week 11, 2026
- Total tackles: 613
- Sacks: 139.5
- Forced fumbles: 27
- Fumble recoveries: 9
- Pass deflections: 24
- Interceptions: 2
- Defensive touchdowns: 2
- Stats at Pro Football Reference

Vonnie B'VSean Miller (born March 26, 1989) is an American professional football outside linebacker for the Dallas Cowboys of the National Football League (NFL). Miller played college football for the Texas A&M Aggies, where he earned consensus All-American honors and the 2010 Butkus Award. He was selected by the Denver Broncos with the second overall pick in the 2011 NFL draft. Miller has been a seven-time All-Pro selection and eight-time Pro Bowl selection during his career.

As of August 2026, he has the most career sacks of any active player and the most career sacks in Broncos history with 110.5. At the conclusion of the 2015 NFL season, Miller was named the MVP of Super Bowl 50. In 2021, Miller was traded to the Los Angeles Rams and was a member of the team that won Super Bowl LVI. Miller later played with the Buffalo Bills from 2022 to 2024 and with the Washington Commanders in 2025.

== Early life ==
Miller was born on March 26, 1989, in DeSoto, Texas, a suburb of Dallas. He attended DeSoto High School, where he played for the DeSoto Eagles high school football team and ran track. In his junior year, he recorded 37 tackles, 14 tackles for loss, 7 sacks, and 12 quarterback hurries. As a senior, he was named the District 8-5A Defensive MVP after making 76 tackles, 14 tackles for loss, and 6 sacks. He played with future Aggie teammate Cyrus Gray.

In track and field, Miller competed in events such as the 110 m hurdles (personal record (PR) of 14.38 s), triple jump (PR of 12.65 m), and javelin throw (PR of 37.24 m). Considered a four-star recruit by Rivals.com, Miller was listed as the number-15 weakside defensive end in the nation in 2007. He chose Texas A&M over offers from Florida, LSU, Oklahoma, and Texas Tech.

== College career ==
Miller attended Texas A&M University, where he played for the Texas A&M Aggies football team from 2007 to 2010. As a freshman at defensive end in 2007, he was named Freshman All-Big 12 by The Sporting News after posting 22 tackles, including 10 solo stops. He recorded two sacks, four tackles for loss, and a forced fumble. He played in a 4–2–5 defense. He weighed 220 pounds during his freshman year.

In spring 2008, newly hired head coach Mike Sherman was discouraged by Miller's habits of skipping class and failing to produce during practice. Sherman decided to suspend Miller for that spring. Disappointed, Miller considered transferring, but upon his father's insistence, stayed. Miller then adopted a more serious attitude.

As a sophomore in 2008, Miller played at weakside linebacker under Joe Kines's 4–3 defense. He saw action in all 12 games, making 44 tackles, including 25 solo stops, and leading the team with 3.5 sacks. He made 7.5 tackles for loss, forced two fumbles, and recovered two more. His role was more confined to pass coverage, as opposed to rushing the quarterback, thus he was not able to showcase his pass-rushing abilities. In his final seven Big 12 games, he compiled just eight tackles.

As a junior in 2009, Miller adopted the role of the jack position, a defensive end/linebacker hybrid, which allowed him to use his pass-rushing abilities. He enjoyed a breakout season for the Aggies, leading the nation in sacks with 17 and ranking fourth in the nation with 21 tackles for loss. For his efforts, Von Miller was named first-team All Big-12 at defensive end and was named a first-team All-American by Sporting News and Sports Illustrated. He became the first Aggie to be named a first team All-American since Jason Webster in 1999. Then-Aggies defensive coordinator Joe Kines compared Miller to the late Derrick Thomas. Miller then studied and watched film of Thomas to familiarize himself with his game.

As a senior in 2010, Miller switched to playing as a 3–4 outside linebacker under Tim DeRuyter's defense. Early in the season, Miller suffered a high ankle sprain that held him back for the first six games. He posted 10.5 sacks and 17.5 tackles for loss. Again he made first-team All-Big 12 honors and won the Butkus Award as the nation's top linebacker. He was also named a consensus first-team All-American. He received first-team All-American honors from Walter Camp, Scout.com, Pro Football Weekly, ESPN.com and the Associated Press. Miller graduated with a degree in poultry science and raises chickens in his spare time.

== Professional career ==
Miller was projected to be a second-round pick in the 2010 NFL draft had he passed on his senior season. He entered the 2011 NFL draft regarded as one of the best 3–4 outside linebackers available by NFL draft experts and scouts and was projected to be a top five draft pick. At the 2011 Senior Bowl, Miller was the Defensive MVP. Among linebackers at the 2011 NFL Combine, Miller ranked second in the 40-yard dash, third in the vertical jump, first in the broad jump, third in the 20-yard shuttle, tied for first in the three-cone drill, and first in the 60-yard shuttle. His 11.15-second 60-yard shuttle broke the combine linebacker record. At the Texas A&M Pro Day in March 2011, Miller ran a 4.49-second 40-yard dash.

Pre-draft measurables
Height	Weight	Arm length	Hand span	Wingspan	40-yard dash	10-yard split	20-yard split	20-yard shuttle	Three-cone drill	Vertical jump	Broad jump	Bench press
6 ft 2 5/8 in (1.90 m)	246 lb (112 kg)	33 1/2 in (0.85 m)	9 1/4 in (0.23 m)	6 ft 8 5/8 in (2.05 m)	4.49 s	1.59 s	2.61 s	4.06 s	6.70 s	37 in (0.94 m)	10 ft 6 in (3.20 m)	21 reps
All values from NFL Combine/Pro Day

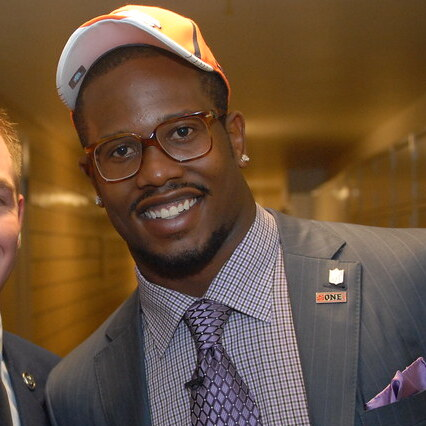
Miller at the 2011 NFL draft

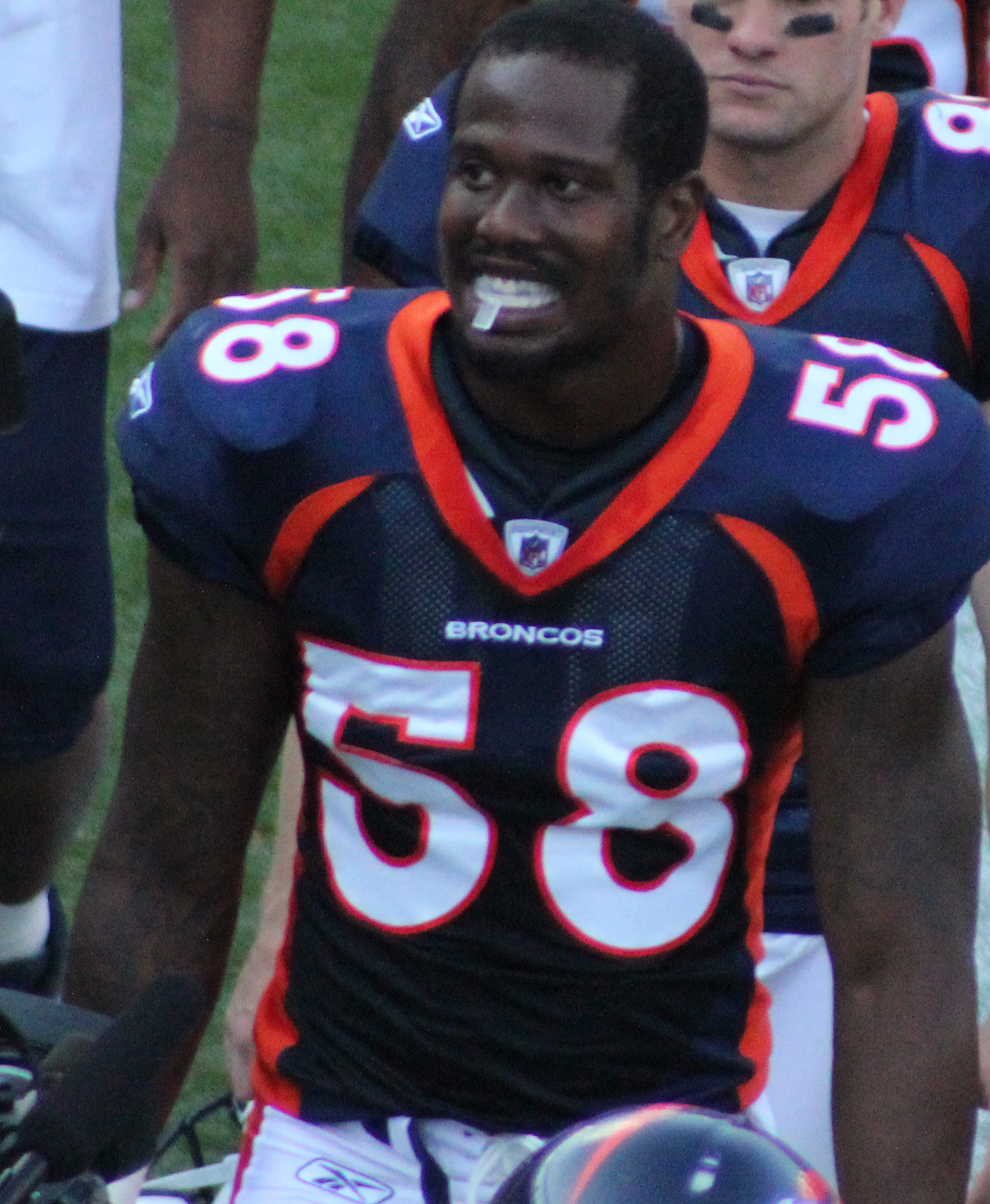
Miller with the Denver Broncos in 2011

In March 2011, Miller was selected to represent top-flight rookies in the NFL Labor Union talks. He was persuaded by former NFL running back LaDainian Tomlinson to join the lawsuit. During the Texas A&M Pro Day, one scout compared him to Hall of Famer Derrick Thomas, while Bengals defensive coordinator Mike Zimmer compared him to Cardinals linebacker Joey Porter. NFL Network Analyst Mike Mayock, who rated Miller as the second-best player in the draft, stated that Miller reminded him of a smaller version of DeMarcus Ware. Miller's then-personal trainer, Dan Brandenburg, who also worked with first-round picks Clay Matthews III and Sean Weatherspoon, stated Miller is the best athlete of all three.

=== Denver Broncos ===
==== 2011 ====
Miller was selected by the Denver Broncos second overall in the 2011 NFL draft. He was the highest-selected linebacker since LaVar Arrington went number two to the Washington Redskins in 2000. He also became the Aggies' highest draft pick since Quentin Coryatt, who was selected second overall in 1992. The selection of Miller surprised certain experts. Denver was switching from a 3–4 defense to a 4–3, a defense which seemed counterintuitive to Miller's strengths. Former Broncos quarterback John Elway, who is also the executive vice president of the franchise, said Miller is "a type of guy that comes around every 10 years". On July 28, 2011, Miller signed his rookie contract. He wore number 58 in honor of Pro Football Hall of Fame linebacker Derrick Thomas.

On September 12, 2011, in his first career play from scrimmage, Miller forced a fumble against the Oakland Raiders. On September 18, 2011, he had his first sack on Andy Dalton when the Broncos played the Cincinnati Bengals.

Miller was named the AFC Defensive Player of the Week for his Week 11 performance against the New York Jets. The Broncos made the playoffs and faced off against the Pittsburgh Steelers in the Wild Card Round. In his playoff debut, Miller had three solo tackles and one quarterback hit in the 29–23 overtime victory. In the Divisional Round against the New England Patriots, he had two quarterback hits in the 45–10 loss.

Miller was selected to the 2012 Pro Bowl and was named AP Defensive Rookie of the Year. Overall, in 907 snaps, he recorded 11.5 sacks, 19 quarterback hits and 29 quarterback hurries. He was fined three times during the season. He was ranked 52nd by his fellow players on the NFL Top 100 Players of 2012.

==== 2012 ====
Miller got off to a quick start in his second season, registering 10 sacks in nine games. In this period, he recorded 30 quarterback hurries, more than he had during his entire 2011 campaign. Thanks to this tremendous start, he was considered an MVP candidate. On November 16, he was fined $21,000 for a hit on Carolina Panthers quarterback Cam Newton in week 10. He received his second career AFC Defensive Player of the Week honor after recording three sacks and two forced fumbles against the San Diego Chargers the following week. For his efforts during November, he was awarded AFC Defensive Player of the Month. On December 26, 2012, he was announced the starting outside linebacker in the AFC division for the 2013 Pro Bowl. Miller finished the season third in sacks with 18 1/2, breaking a Denver Broncos record of 17 previously held by Elvis Dumervil. He also capped off the 2012 season finishing second in voting for Defensive Player of the Year and being named first-team All-Pro. In the Divisional Round of the playoffs, Miller had nine total tackles and two quarterback hits in the 38–35 2OT loss to the Baltimore Ravens.

In 2012, Miller teamed up with Ubisoft, makers of the video game The Hip Hop Dance Experience, to create his own sack celebration dance called the "DeSoto Shuffle" that was inspired by the video game. Each time he performed the dance during a game, Ubisoft made a charitable donation to Von's Vision, a foundation devoted to providing eye care and glasses to underprivileged youth. He was ranked 9th by his fellow players on the NFL Top 100 Players of 2013.

Miller (third from right) was one of several NFL players who visited U.S. Army soldiers in Afghanistan in 2013

==== 2013 ====
In July 2013, ESPN reported that Miller had been suspended four games for violating league policy, pending appeal. He tweeted that he did "nothing wrong". In August 2013, he lost the appeal and was suspended for six games. The six-game suspension arose after the NFL learned that he attempted to cheat a drug test. He became eligible to play on October 20, 2013, when the Broncos played the Indianapolis Colts. On November 24, in a loss to the Patriots, he recovered a Stevan Ridley fumble and took it 60 yards for a touchdown. It was the second touchdown of his career. He did fairly well upon his return, but his season was ended prematurely when he suffered a torn anterior cruciate ligament (ACL) in his right knee on December 22, 2013, during a win on the road at the Houston Texans.

Without Miller, the Broncos reached Super Bowl XLVIII, but lost 43–8 to the Seattle Seahawks. He was ranked 76th by his fellow players on the NFL Top 100 Players of 2014.

==== 2014 ====
After recovering from his ACL injury, Miller returned for his fourth season with the Broncos. Miller earned AFC Defensive Player of the Month for October. He recorded 14 sacks, 59 tackles, and a forced fumble. In the Divisional Round of the playoffs against the Colts, he had six total tackles and one quarterback hit in the 24–13 loss. He earned a Pro Bowl nomination for his 2014 season. He was ranked 33rd by his fellow players on the NFL Top 100 Players of 2015.

==== 2015 ====
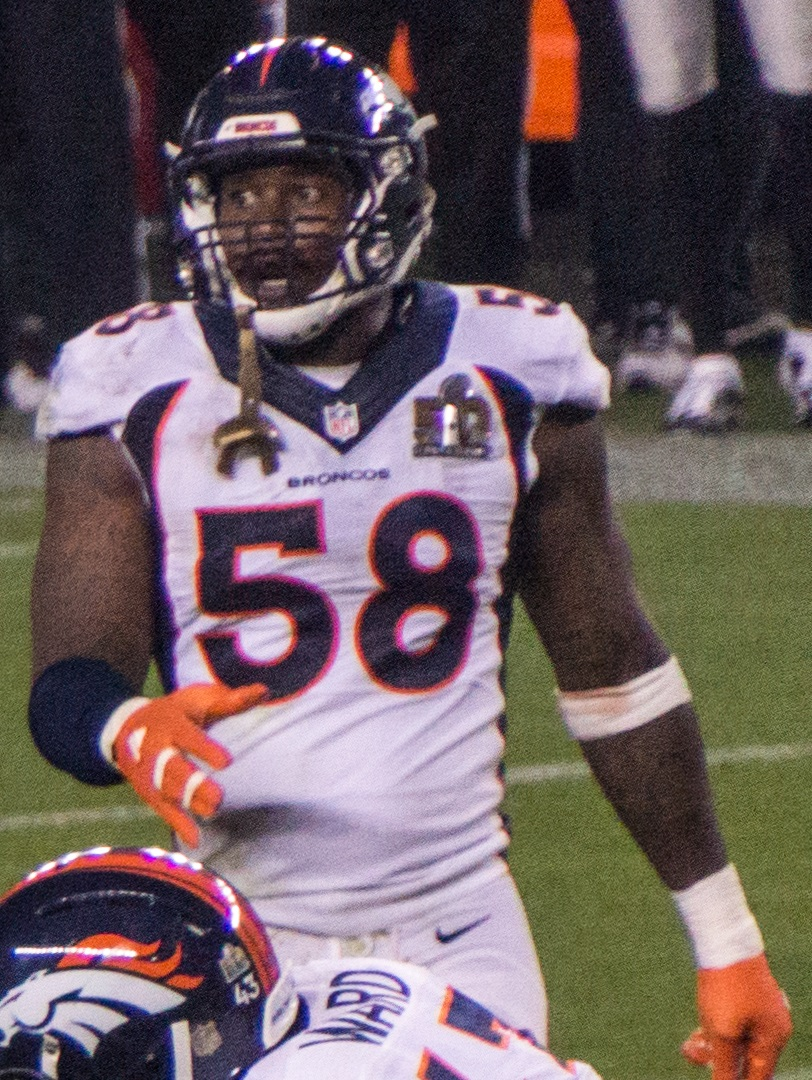
Miller in Super Bowl 50

On September 17, 2015, Miller became the third-fastest player in NFL history to reach 50 career sacks (58 games). The only ones to get there faster than him were Reggie White (40 games) and Derrick Thomas (54). Overall, in the 2015 season, Miller finished with 11 sacks, 35 total tackles, 32 quarterback hits, one pass defended, and four forced fumbles.

In the Divisional Round against the Steelers, he had two total tackles in the 23–16 victory. During the AFC Championship against the Patriots, Miller sacked Tom Brady 2 1/2 times, breaking a Broncos single-game playoff record and also had an interception in the second quarter of the game.

In Super Bowl 50, facing the Panthers, who held the top-ranked offense, the Broncos won 24–10. In the first quarter, on a 3rd-and-10 from the 15-yard line, Miller knocked the ball out of Panthers quarterback Cam Newton's hands while sacking him, and defensive end Malik Jackson recovered it in the end zone for a Broncos touchdown, giving the team a 10–0 lead. This was the first fumble return touchdown in a Super Bowl since Super Bowl XXVIII. With 4:51 left in regulation and the Broncos leading 16–10, Miller forced a second fumble from Newton to end the Panthers' potential game-winning drive, and the Broncos offense afterwards scored a touchdown to seal the victory. Miller recorded six tackles, a pass defended, 2 1/2 sacks, two forced fumbles, and two quarterback hurries, and was named Super Bowl MVP for his performance. His performance in Super Bowl 50 is widely regarded as one of the greatest individual defensive performances in Super Bowl history.

Miller was named to his fourth Pro Bowl, earned his second first-team All-Pro, and was ranked 15th by his fellow players on the NFL Top 100 Players of 2016.

==== 2016 ====
On March 1, 2016, the Broncos placed the exclusive franchise tag on Miller. On July 15, Miller signed a 6-year deal worth $114.5 million featuring $70 million guaranteed with the Broncos. He became the highest-paid defensive player in NFL history, with the highest guaranteed salary.

Miller earned AFC Defensive Player of the Week for week 2 against the Colts. He earned AFC Defensive Player of the Month for September. Miller finished the 2016 regular season with 13 1/2 sacks and 24 quarterback hits. In the last four games of the season, Miller did not record a sack, which was the longest such stretch in his career. He was named to his fifth career and third consecutive Pro Bowl, and his third first-team All-Pro, and was ranked second by his fellow players on the NFL Top 100 Players of 2017 as the highest ranked defensive player.

==== 2017 ====
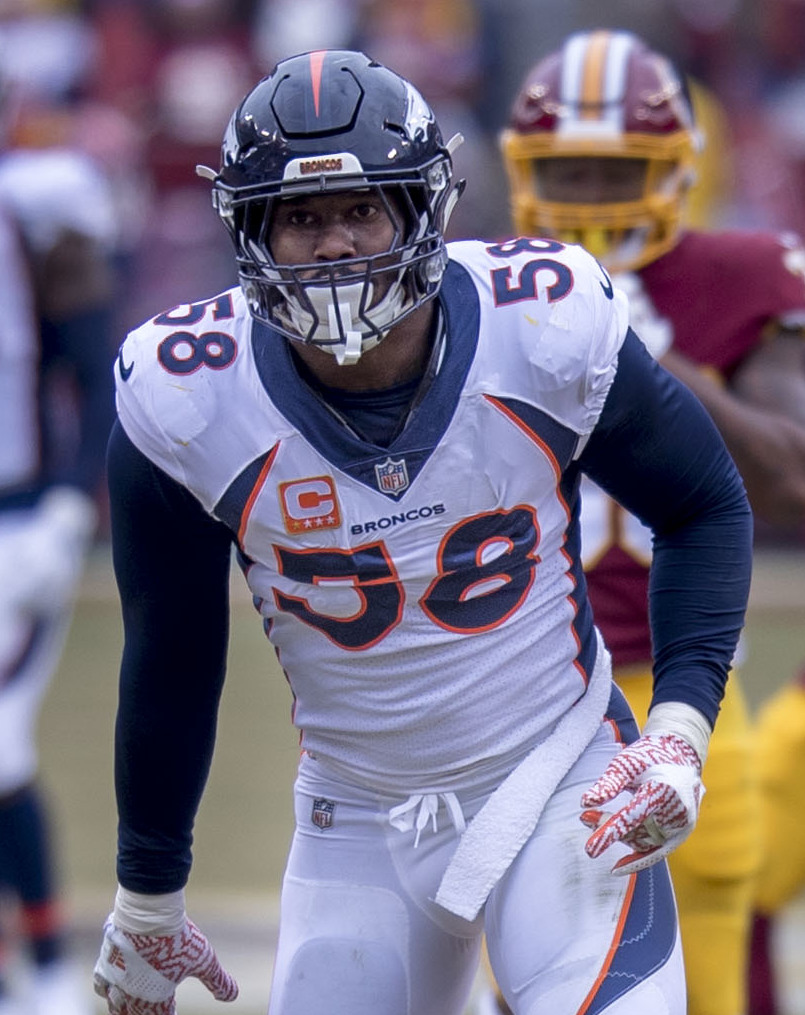
Miller in 2017

On December 19, 2017, Miller was named to his sixth Pro Bowl. Miller was named the 2018 Pro Bowl defensive MVP. In the 2017 season, he recorded his fourth consecutive season with at least 10 sacks. He was ranked ninth by his fellow players on the NFL Top 100 Players of 2018.

==== 2018 ====
In the Broncos' 2018 season opener against the Seahawks, Miller recorded three sacks and seven total tackles in the 27–24 victory. In week 11, Miller intercepted Philip Rivers and returned it 42 yards to set up a touchdown, which helped ignite a 23–22 comeback win over the Los Angeles Chargers, earning him AFC Defensive Player of the Week.

During the 2018 season, Miller recorded his 100th career sack (including postseason sacks), becoming the fifth-fastest player in NFL history to do so. He was also selected to the 2019 Pro Bowl as a starting outside linebacker, which was his seventh career and fifth consecutive Pro Bowl. He was ranked 10th by his fellow players on the NFL Top 100 Players of 2019.

==== 2019 ====
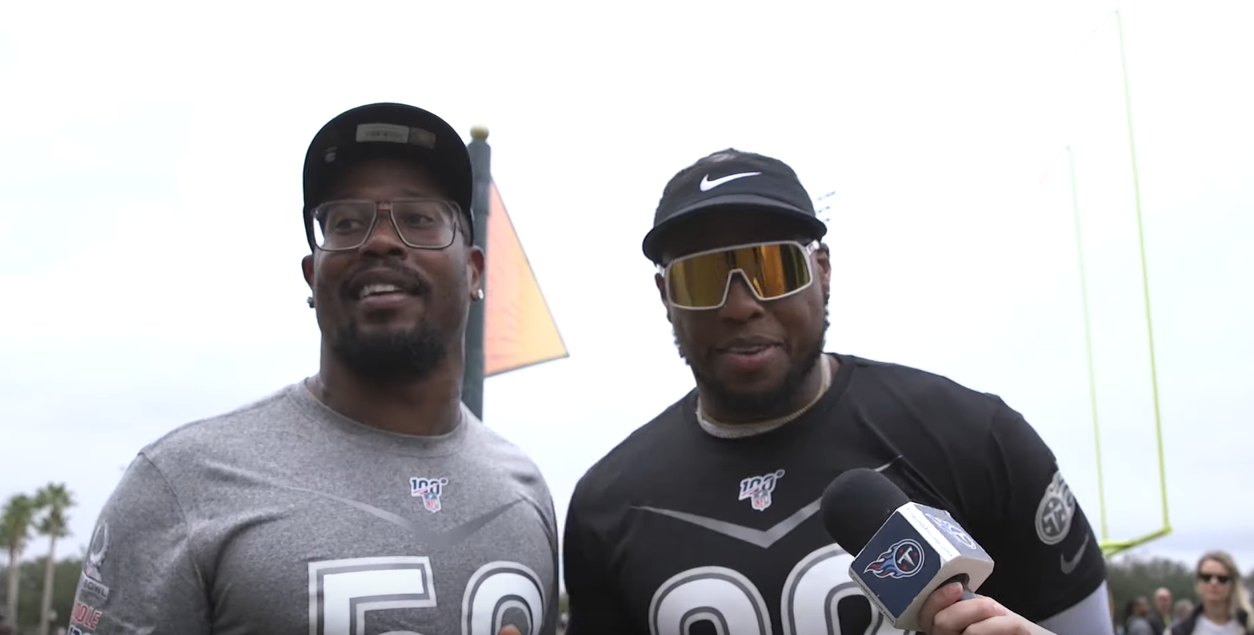
Miller alongside Derrick Henry at the 2020 Pro Bowl

In week 4 against the Jacksonville Jaguars, Miller sacked Gardner Minshew twice in the 26–24 loss. Miller's second sack of the game was the 100th sack of his career.

He was also selected to the 2020 Pro Bowl as a starting outside linebacker, which was his eighth career and sixth consecutive Pro Bowl. He was ranked 26th by his fellow players on the NFL Top 100 Players of 2020. He was named to the Pro Football Hall of Fame All-Decade Team for the 2010s.

==== 2020 ====
During practice on September 8, 2020, Miller suffered what was called a "freak injury near the ankle", and season-ending surgery was feared to be required. An MRI the next day revealed that the injury was a dislocated peroneal tendon, and Miller was subsequently placed on injured reserve.

==== 2021 ====
In March 2021, the Broncos exercised the 2021 year option in Miller's contract. His contract, which entered its final year, guaranteed $7 million of his base salary of $17.5 million in 2021.

Miller recorded 4 1/2 sacks and 17 tackles in six games. Miller earned AFC Defensive Player of the Month for September. He sprained his ankle against the Cleveland Browns on October 21, 2021, which ended up being his final game as a Bronco.

=== Los Angeles Rams ===
Miller was traded to the Los Angeles Rams in exchange for second and third-round draft picks in the 2022 NFL draft on November 1, 2021. At the time of the trade, Miller was the longest-tenured Bronco, and the only remaining nonspecial-teams player from Denver's Super Bowl 50 roster. In an emotional interview following his trade, Miller held back tears, saying, "I love Broncos Country. When I said 'Broncos for life,' I meant that. It was an honor and a privilege to play here." Miller chose to wear number 40 for the Rams, his number at Texas A&M, with the familial blessing of Rams legend Elroy Hirsch, since his number 58 was taken by Justin Hollins.

In week 10, Miller made his Rams debut and tallied three tackles in a 31–10 loss to the San Francisco 49ers. In week 15, a 20–10 home win against Seattle, Miller notched his first sack as a Ram against Seahawks quarterback Russell Wilson. In week 16, Miller recorded a sack against Kirk Cousins in a 30–23 road win over the Minnesota Vikings. In week 17, Miller had his best game as a Ram by notching two sacks and five tackles, including the game-sealing sack on Ravens quarterback Tyler Huntley in the 20–19 victory. Overall in the 2021 season, Miller recorded 50 tackles, 9 1/2 sacks, one pass defended, and one forced fumble in 15 games played. In Super Bowl LVI against the Cincinnati Bengals, Miller recorded two sacks in the Rams' 23–20 victory. His multiple-sack performance makes him only the second player to ever have multiple Super Bowl games with multiple sacks. The other is Justin Tuck of the New York Giants. He also tied Charles Haley's record for most career Super Bowl sacks at 4 1/2 sacks, despite playing in three fewer Super Bowls than Haley. He was ranked 93rd by his fellow players on the NFL Top 100 Players of 2022.

=== Buffalo Bills ===
==== 2022 ====
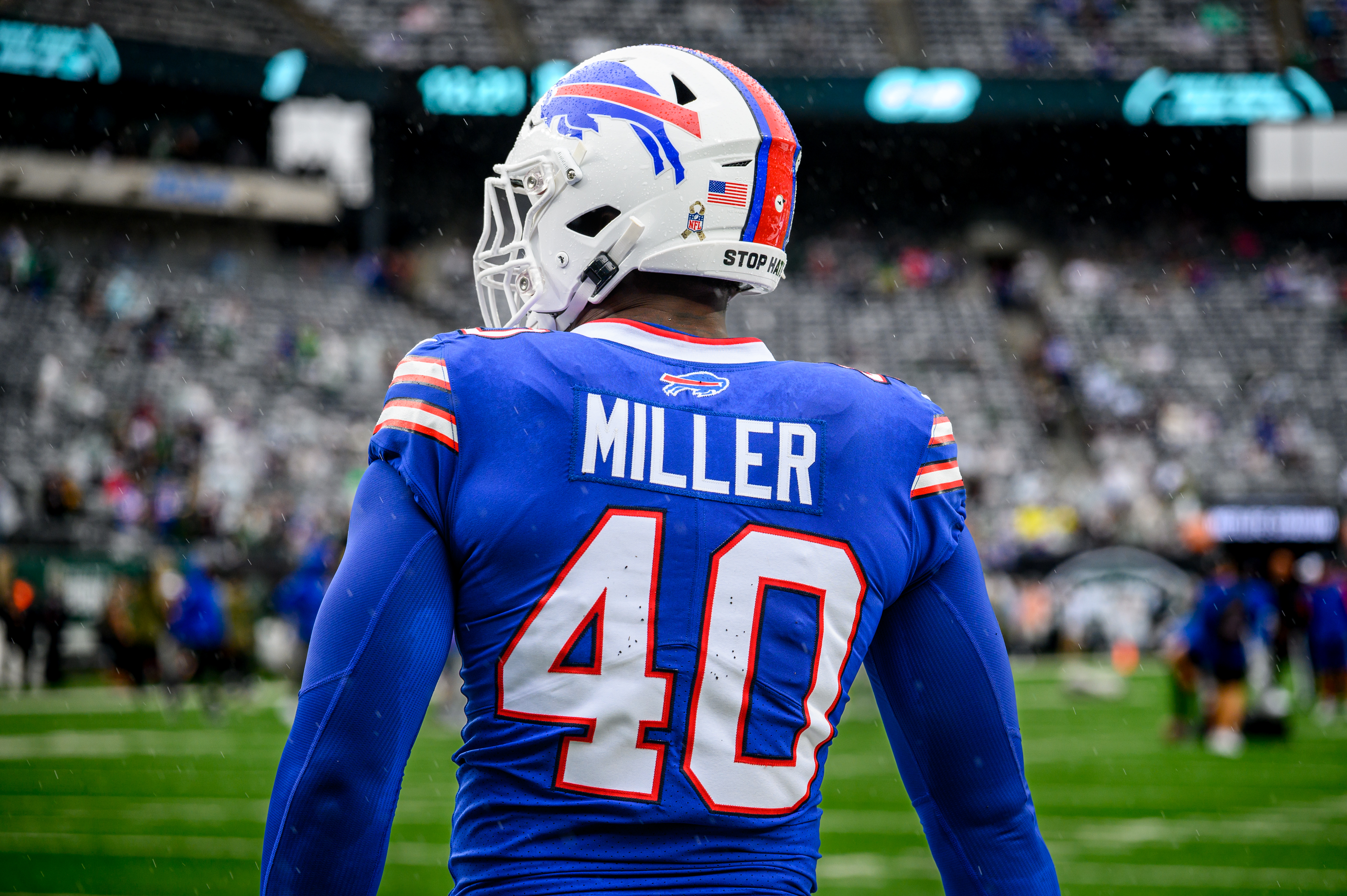
Miller with the Buffalo Bills in 2022

On March 16, 2022, Miller signed with the Buffalo Bills on a six-year, $120 million deal. In his debut with the team, he recorded two sacks, two quarterback hits, and three tackles for loss in a 31–10 Bills victory over his former team, the Rams in the NFL Kickoff Game. During a Thanksgiving Day game in Detroit against the Lions, Miller exited with an apparent knee injury. The next day, Miller was confirmed to be out for at least 2–4 weeks. He was placed on injured reserve on December 1, 2022. During exploratory surgery on his knee, Miller was found to have torn his ACL and would miss the remainder of the season. He had suffered the same injury in the same knee as a Bronco, nine years earlier in December 2013.

==== 2023 ====
Miller was placed on the reserve/PUP list to start the 2023 season. He was activated on October 7, 2023. On November 30, 2023, he was accused of abusing his pregnant girlfriend. There was a warrant out for his arrest before he ultimately turned himself in and was released on $5,000 bond.

Miller struggled after returning from his ACL injury and fell behind other Bills edge rushers on the depth chart during the season. In what was by far the least productive season of his career, Miller collected three combined tackles and zero sacks in twelve regular season games for Buffalo. He also added two combined tackles during the Bills' playoff run, which ended in the AFC Divisional Round when the team lost to the Kansas City Chiefs by a final score of 27–24.

==== 2024 ====
In October, Miller was given a four-game suspension without pay for violating the NFL's personal conduct policy. In the 2024 season, Miller finished with six sacks. In the Divisional Round against the Baltimore Ravens, Miller recovered a fumble forced by Damar Hamlin and returned it 39 yards to help set up the Bills on an eventual touchdown score in the 27–25 win. Miller was released on March 9, 2025.

=== Washington Commanders ===
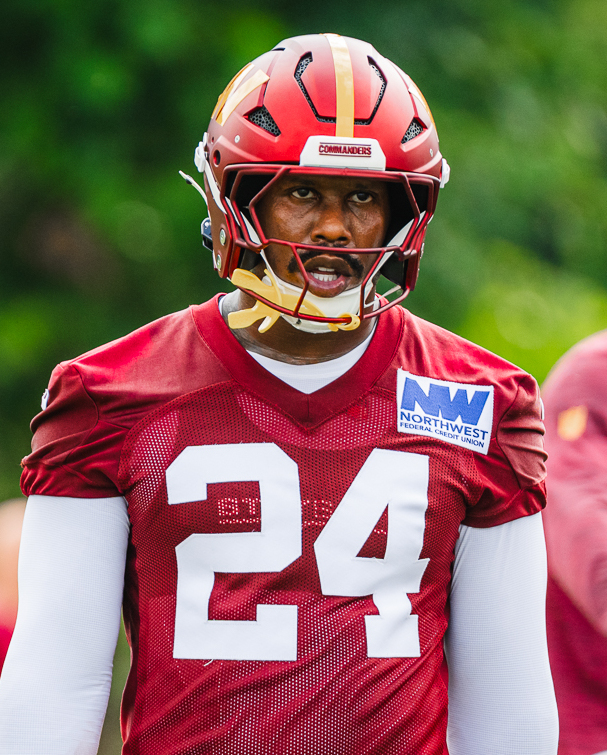
Miller participating at Commanders training camp in 2025

On July 21, 2025, Miller signed a one-year contract with the Washington Commanders worth $6.1 million, with up to $10.5 million in incentives. Miller chose to wear jersey number 24 as a tribute and sign of respect for the late Kobe Bryant and retired cornerback and Broncos teammate, Champ Bailey (who originally started his NFL career in Washington). At the end of the 2025 season, he led the team with nine sacks.

=== Dallas Cowboys ===
On August 16, 2026, Miller signed with the Dallas Cowboys on a one–year contract worth $5.5 million, with up to $7.5 million in incentives.

== Career statistics ==
Legend
	Super Bowl MVP
	Won the Super Bowl
	Led the league
**Bold**	Career high

=== NFL ===
==== Regular season ====
Year	Team	Games		Tackles					Fumbles				Interceptions			
Year	Team	GP	GS	Cmb	Solo	Ast	Sck	TFL	FF	FR	Yds	TD	Int	Yds	TD	PD
2011	DEN	15	15	64	50	14	11.5	19	2	0	0	0	0	0	0	**4**
2012	DEN	16	16	68	55	13	**18.5**	**28**	**6**	0	0	0	**1**	26	**1**	2
2013	DEN	9	9	34	27	7	5.0	9	3	1	**60**	**1**	0	0	0	1
2014	DEN	16	16	59	42	17	14.0	16	1	1	2	0	0	0	0	2
2015	DEN	16	16	35	30	5	11.0	9	4	**3**	0	0	0	0	0	1
2016	DEN	16	16	**78**	**62**	16	13.5	13	3	0	0	0	0	0	0	3
2017	DEN	16	16	57	51	6	10.0	17	2	1	0	0	0	0	0	3
2018	DEN	16	16	48	29	**19**	14.5	14	4	**3**	3	0	**1**	**42**	0	3
2019	DEN	15	15	46	33	13	8.0	10	0	0	0	0	0	0	0	2
2020	DEN	0	0	Did not play due to injury												
2021	DEN	7	7	19	10	9	4.5	7	0	0	0	0	0	0	0	0
2021	LAR	8	8	31	23	8	5.0	12	1	0	0	0	0	0	0	1
2022	BUF	11	11	21	18	3	8.0	10	1	0	0	0	0	0	0	2
2023	BUF	12	0	3	2	1	0.0	0	0	0	0	0	0	0	0	0
2024	BUF	13	0	17	13	4	6.0	7	0	0	0	0	0	0	0	0
2025	WAS	17	3	26	16	10	9.0	6	0	0	0	0	0	0	0	0
2026	DAL	11	1	6	4	2	1.0	2	0	0	0	0	0	0	0	0
Career		214	165	613	466	147	139.5	179	27	9	65	1	2	68	1	24

==== Postseason ====
Year	Team	Games		Tackles					Fumbles				Interceptions			
Year	Team	GP	GS	Cmb	Solo	Ast	Sck	TFL	FF	FR	Yds	TD	Int	Yds	TD	PD
2011	DEN	2	2	3	3	0	1.0	2	0	0	0	0	0	0	0	0
2012	DEN	1	1	9	7	**2**	0.5	0	0	0	0	0	0	0	0	0
2013	DEN	0	0	Did not play due to injury												
2014	DEN	1	1	6	5	1	0.0	2	0	0	0	0	0	0	0	0
2015	DEN	3	3	13	11	**2**	**5.0**	2	**2**	0	0	0	**1**	**4**	0	**2**
2021	LAR	4	4	**14**	**12**	**2**	4.0	**6**	1	**1**	0	0	0	0	0	1
2022	BUF	0	0	Did not play due to injury												
2023	BUF	2	0	2	1	1	0.0	0	0	0	0	0	0	0	0	0
2024	BUF	3	0	2	1	1	0.0	0	0	**1**	**39**	0	0	0	0	0
Career		16	11	49	40	9	10.5	12	3	2	39	0	1	4	0	3

=== College ===
Legend
Led the NCAA

College statistics
Season	Team	GP	Tackles					Interceptions					Fumbles			
Season	Team	GP	Cmb	Solo	Ast	TfL	Sck	Int	Yds	Avg	TD	PD	FF	FR	Yds	TD
2007	Texas A&M	9	22	10	12	4	2	–	–	–	–	–	1	–	–	–
2008	Texas A&M	12	44	25	19	7.5	3.5	–	–	–	–	–	2	–	–	–
2009	Texas A&M	13	47	31	16	**21.5**	**17**	–	–	–	–	**5**	**4**	–	–	–
2010	Texas A&M	13	**68**	**38**	**30**	17.5	10.5	**1**	**3**	**3**	–	–	–	–	–	–
Career		47	181	104	77	50.5	33	1	3	3	0	5	7	0	0	0

== Career highlights ==
=== Awards and honors ===
NFL

- 2× Super Bowl champion (50, LVI)
- Super Bowl MVP (50)
- NFL Defensive Rookie of the Year (2011)
- 3× First-team All-Pro (2012, 2015, 2016)
- 4× Second-team All-Pro (2011, 2014, 2017, 2018)
- 8× Pro Bowl (2011, 2012, 2014–2019)
- 100 sacks club
- Pro Bowl Defensive MVP (2017)
- NFL 2010s All-Decade Team
- 10× NFL Top 100 — 52nd (2012), 9th (2013), 76th (2014), 33rd (2015), 15th (2016), 2nd (2017), 9th (2018), 10th (2019), 26th (2020), 93rd (2022)

College

- Butkus Award (pro) (2012)
- PFWA All-Rookie Team (2011)
- Butkus Award (college) (2010)
- Jack Lambert Trophy (2010)
- Consensus All-American (2010)
- First-team All-American (2009)
- NCAA sacks leader (2009)
- 2× first-team All-Big 12 (2009, 2010)

=== Records ===
==== Broncos franchise records ====
As of his departure from the team in 2021, Miller holds five Broncos franchise records for sacks, including:

- Career (110 1/2 sacks)
- Single season (18 1/2 in 2012)
- Playoff career (6 1/2)
- Single playoff season (5 in 2015)
- Single playoff game (2 1/2 on both January 24, 2016, against the New England Patriots in the AFC Championship and February 7, 2016, against the Carolina Panthers in Super Bowl 50)

==== NFL records ====
- Most sacks in the Super Bowl – 4 1/2 (50, LVI) (tied with Charles Haley)

== Personal life ==
Miller's parents Von and Gloria were both college athletes and own a power supply business. He has a younger brother Vinsynzie "Vins". Having majored in poultry science at Texas A&M, Miller operates his own farm, raising chickens. Miller has had two children with a longtime girlfriend.

On March 8, 2016, Miller was announced as one of the celebrities who would compete on season 22 of Dancing with the Stars. He was partnered with professional dancer Witney Carson. On May 2, 2016, during a double elimination, Miller and Carson were eliminated and finished the competition in eighth place.

During a Celebrity Wheel of Fortune episode aired January 30, 2022 (the same date Miller's Rams played in the 2021 NFC Championship Game), Miller won the minimum $30,000 for his selected charity, Von's Vision.

=== Legal issues ===
In August 2013, Miller was arrested on a failure to appear warrant for driving-related charges in October 2012. In September 2013, Miller was cited for speeding and driving with a suspended license in Arapahoe County, Colorado.

In April 2018, while on a guided fishing tour off the coast of Florida, Miller is alleged to have illegally landed and improperly caught and released a hammerhead shark.

On November 30, 2023, the Dallas Police Department issued an arrest warrant for Miller, alleging that he assaulted a pregnant woman. Miller turned himself in and posted a $5,000 bond and was released. Multiple police sources claimed that the pregnant woman who accused him of assaulting her was in fact his girlfriend and that the incident happened at their home in Dallas on November 29, 2023. She was not hospitalized but was treated for minor injuries. She had previously accused him of assaulting her in 2021 as well although no charges were filed against him. Despite the fact she was found to have abrasions on her left hand and bruises on her neck, abdomen and left bicep after she called the police in November 2023, the girlfriend later recanted the assault claim.
