= 2018 All-Pro Team =

Official list of the best NFL players in 2018

The 2018 All-Pro teams were named by the Associated Press (AP), Pro Football Writers of America (PFWA), and Sporting News (SN) for performance in the 2018 NFL season. While none of the All-Pro teams have the official imprimatur of the NFL (whose official recognition is nomination to the 2019 Pro Bowl), they are included in the NFL Record and Fact Book and also part of the language of the 2011 NFLPA Collective Bargaining Agreement. Any player selected to the first-team of any of the teams can be described as an "All-Pro." The AP team, with first-team and second-team selections, was chosen by a national panel of fifty NFL writers and broadcasters. The Sporting News All-NFL team is voted on by NFL players and executives and will be released at a later date. The PFWA team is selected by its more than 300 national members who are accredited media members covering the NFL.

== Teams ==
Offense
Position	First team	Second team
Quarterback	Patrick Mahomes, Kansas City (AP, PFWA); Drew Brees, New Orleans (SN)	Drew Brees, New Orleans (AP-2)
Running back	Todd Gurley, Los Angeles Rams (AP, PFWA, SN); Ezekiel Elliott. Dallas, (PFWA); Saquon Barkley, New York Giants (SN)	Ezekiel Elliott, Dallas (AP-2)
Flex	Tyreek Hill, Kansas City (AP)	Christian McCaffrey, Carolina (AP-2)
Tight end	Travis Kelce, Kansas City (AP, PFWA); Zach Ertz, Philadelphia (SN)	George Kittle, San Francisco (AP-2)
Wide receiver	Michael Thomas, New Orleans (AP, PFWA, SN); DeAndre Hopkins, Houston (AP, PFWA-t, SN); Julio Jones, Atlanta (PFWA-t)	Tyreek Hill, Kansas City (AP-2); Julio Jones, Atlanta (AP-2)
Left tackle	David Bakhtiari, Green Bay (AP)	Terron Armstead, New Orleans (AP-2t); Duane Brown, Seattle (AP-2t)
Left guard	Quenton Nelson, Indianapolis (AP)	Joel Bitonio, Cleveland (AP-2)
Center	Jason Kelce, Philadelphia (AP, PFWA, SN)	Maurkice Pouncey, Pittsburgh (AP-2)
Right guard	Zack Martin, Dallas (AP)	Marshal Yanda, Baltimore (AP-2)
Right tackle	Mitchell Schwartz, Kansas City (AP)	Ryan Ramczyk, New Orleans (AP-2)
Tackle	David Bakhtiari, Green Bay (PFWA); Mitchell Schwartz, Kansas City (PFWA); Terron Armstead, New Orleans (SN); Tyron Smith, Dallas (SN)	
Guard	Quenton Nelson, Indianapolis (PFWA, SN); Zack Martin, Dallas (PFWA, SN)	

Special teams
Position	First team	Second team
Kicker	Justin Tucker, Baltimore (AP, PFWA); Aldrick Rosas, New York Giants (SN)	Aldrick Rosas, New York Giants (AP-2)
Punter	Michael Dickson, Seattle (AP, PFWA, SN)	Johnny Hekker, Los Angeles Rams (AP-2)
Kick returner	Andre Roberts, New York Jets (AP, PFWA, SN)	Cordarrelle Patterson, New England (AP-2)
Punt returner	Tarik Cohen, Chicago (AP, PFWA, SN)	Desmond King, Los Angeles Chargers (AP-2)
Special teams	Adrian Phillips, Los Angeles Chargers (AP, PFWA)	Cory Littleton, Los Angeles Rams (AP-2)

Defense
Position	First team	Second team
Edge rusher	J. J. Watt, Houston (AP, PFWA, SN); Khalil Mack, Chicago (AP); Danielle Hunter, Minnesota (PFWA, SN)	Von Miller, Denver (AP-2); Danielle Hunter, Minnesota (AP-2t); Myles Garrett, Cleveland (AP-2t); Cameron Jordan, New Orleans (AP-2t)
Interior lineman	Fletcher Cox, Philadelphia (AP, PFWA, SN); Aaron Donald, Los Angeles Rams (AP, PFWA, SN)	Chris Jones, Kansas City (AP-2); J. J. Watt, Houston (AP-2)
Linebacker	Luke Kuechly, Carolina (AP, SN); Bobby Wagner, Seattle (AP, PFWA); Khalil Mack, Chicago (PFWA, SN); Von Miller, Denver (PFWA, SN); Darius Leonard, Indianapolis (AP)	Von Miller, Denver (AP-2); C. J. Mosley, Baltimore (AP-2); Leighton Vander Esch, Dallas (AP-2)
Cornerback	Stephon Gilmore, New England (AP, PFWA); Kyle Fuller, Chicago (AP, PFWA, SN); Patrick Peterson, Arizona (SN)	Xavien Howard, Miami (AP-2); Byron Jones, Dallas (AP-2)
Safety	Eddie Jackson, Chicago (AP, PFWA, SN); Derwin James, Los Angeles Chargers (AP, PFWA); Jamal Adams, New York Jets (SN)	Harrison Smith, Minnesota (AP-2); Jamal Adams, New York Jets (AP-2)
Defensive back	Desmond King, Los Angeles Chargers (AP)	Derwin James, Los Angeles Chargers (AP-2)

== Key ==
- AP = Associated Press first-team All-Pro
- AP-2 = Associated Press second-team All-Pro
- AP-2t = Tied for second-team All-Pro in the AP vote
- PFWA = Pro Football Writers Association All-NFL
- SN = Sporting News All-Pro

== Position differences ==
PFWA and SN did not separate the tackles and guards into more specific positions as the AP did.

== By NFL Team ==
AFC
Team(Total)	Player(s)
Kansas City(5)	Patrick Mahomes, Quarterback (AP, PFWA); Travis Kelce, Tight end (AP, PFWA); Tyreek Hill, Flex (AP, AP-2*) *Wide receiver Mitchell Schwartz, Tackle (PFWA, AP*) *Right tackle Chris Jones, Interior lineman (AP-2)
Baltimore(3)	Justin Tucker, Kicker (AP, PFWA); Marshal Yanda, Right guard (AP-2); C. J. Mosley, Linebacker (AP-2)
Los Angeles Chargers(3)	Derwin James, Safety (AP, PFWA, AP-2*) *Defensive back Desmond King, Defensive back (AP, AP-2*) *Punt returner Adrian Phillips, Special teams (AP, PFWA)
Cleveland(2)	Joel Bitonio, Left guard (AP-2); Myles Garrett, Edge rusher (AP-2t)
Houston(2)	J. J. Watt, Edge rusher (AP, PFWA, SN, AP-2*) *Interior lineman DeAndre Hopkins, Wide receiver (AP, PFWA, SN)
Indianapolis(2)	Quenton Nelson, Guard (AP*, PFWA, SN) *Left guard Shaquille Leonard, Linebacker (AP)
New England(2)	Stephon Gilmore, Cornerback (AP, PFWA); Cordarrelle Patterson, Kick returner (AP-2)
New York Jets(2)	Jamal Adams, Safety (SN, AP-2); Andre Roberts, Kick returner (AP, PFWA, SN)
Denver(1)	Von Miller, Edge rusher (PFWA, SN, AP-2*) *Linebacker
Miami(1)	Xavien Howard, Cornerback (AP-2)
Pittsburgh(1)	Maurkice Pouncey, Center (AP-2)

Not Represented
AFC	NFC
Buffalo	Detroit
Cincinnati	Tampa Bay
Jacksonville	Washington
Oakland
Tennessee

NFC
Team(Total)	Player(s)
Dallas(5)	Zack Martin, Right guard (AP, PFWA, SN); Ezekiel Elliott, Running back (PFWA, AP-2); Tyron Smith, Tackle (SN); Byron Jones, Cornerback (AP-2); Leighton Vander Esch, Linebacker (AP-2)
New Orleans(5)	Michael Thomas, Wide receiver (AP, PFWA-t, SN); Drew Brees, Quarterback (SN, AP-2); Terron Armstead, Tackle (SN, AP-2t*) *Left tackle Ryan Ramczyk, Right tackle (AP-2); Cameron Jordan, Edge rusher (AP-2t)
Chicago (4)	Khalil Mack, Linebacker (PFWA, SN, AP*) *Edge rusher Kyle Fuller, Cornerback (AP, PFWA, SN); Eddie Jackson, Safety (AP, PFWA, SN); Tarik Cohen, Punt returner (AP, PFWA, SN)
Los Angeles Rams(4)	Todd Gurley, Running back (AP, PFWA, SN); Aaron Donald, Interior lineman (AP, PFWA, SN); Cory Littleton, Special teams (AP-2); Johnny Hekker, Punter (AP-2)
Philadelphia(3)	Fletcher Cox, Interior lineman (AP, PFWA, SN); Jason Kelce, Center (AP, PFWA, SN); Zach Ertz, Tight end (SN)
Seattle(3)	Bobby Wagner, Linebacker (AP, PFWA); Michael Dickson, Punter (AP, PFWA, SN); Duane Brown, Left tackle (AP-2t)
Carolina(2)	Luke Kuechly, Linebacker (AP, SN); Christian McCaffrey, Flex (AP-2)
Minnesota(2)	Danielle Hunter, Edge rusher (PFWA, SN, AP-2t); Harrison Smith, Safety (AP-2)
New York Giants(2)	Saquon Barkley, Running back (SN); Aldrick Rosas, Kicker (SN, AP-2)
Arizona(1)	Patrick Peterson, Cornerback (SN)
Atlanta(1)	Julio Jones, Wide receiver (AP-2)(PFWA-t)
Green Bay(1)	David Bakhtiari, Left tackle (AP, PFWA)
San Francisco(1)	George Kittle, Tight end (AP-2)
