= 2011 New England Patriots season =

52nd season in franchise history; fourth Super Bowl loss

- Owner: Robert Kraft
- Head coach: Bill Belichick
- Offensive coordinator: Bill O'Brien
- Home stadium: Gillette Stadium

Results
- Record: 13–3
- Division place: 1st AFC East
- Playoffs: Won Divisional Playoffs (vs. Broncos) 45–10; Won AFC Championship (vs. Ravens) 23–20; Lost Super Bowl XLVI (vs. Giants) 17–21
- All-Pros: 4: WR Wes Welker (1st team); TE Rob Gronkowski (1st team); G Logan Mankins (2nd team); DT Vince Wilfork (2nd team)
- Pro Bowlers: 8: QB Tom Brady; WR Wes Welker; TE Rob Gronkowski; G Logan Mankins; G Brian Waters; DE Andre Carter; DT Vince Wilfork; ST Matthew Slater

Uniform
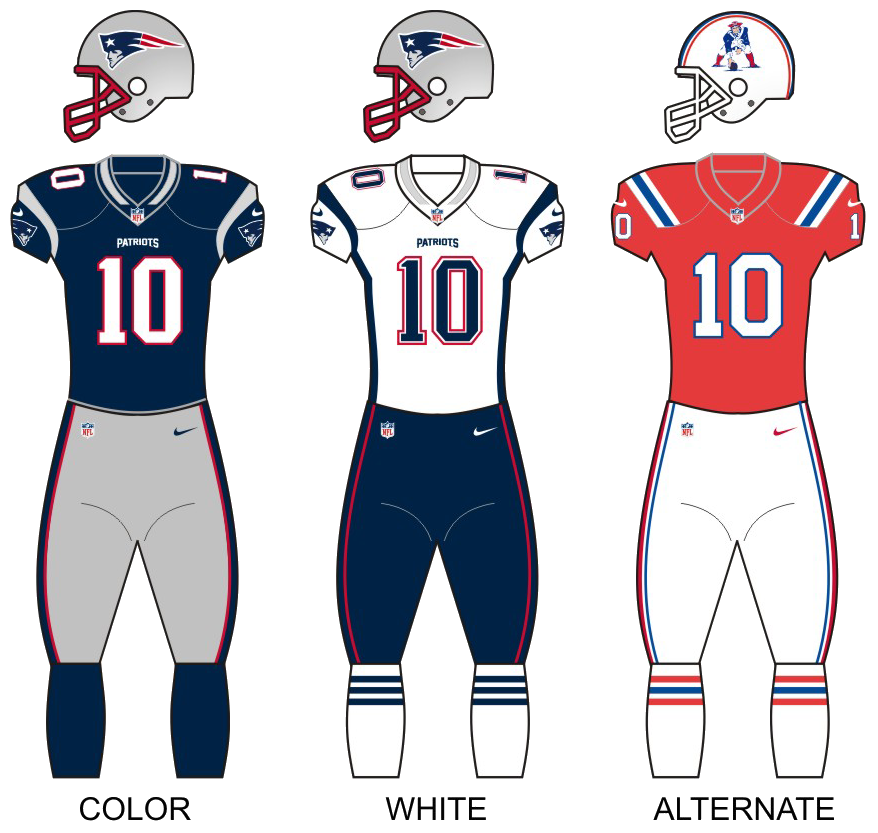

The 2011 season was the New England Patriots' 42nd in the National Football League (NFL) and their 52nd overall. The Patriots finished the regular season at 13–3, and represented the AFC in Super Bowl XLVI. It was the seventh Super Bowl trip in franchise history, and the fifth for head coach Bill Belichick and quarterback Tom Brady.

The Patriots dedicated their 2011 season to the memory of Myra Kraft, the wife of owner Robert Kraft, who died on July 20, 2011, after a long fight against cancer. At both home and away games, the Patriots wore patches bearing Kraft's initials, MHK, on their uniforms. The Patriots elected to wear their Super Bowl patches on the right side of their uniforms, so that they could keep the MHK patch on the left as it had been all season. The Patriots were the only 2011 division winner that won their division the previous season.

The Patriots lost in the Super Bowl to the New York Giants by a score of 21–17. With the loss, along with losses in 1985, 1996, and 2007, the Patriots tied with the Denver Broncos, Buffalo Bills and Minnesota Vikings for most Super Bowl losses at four. The Broncos would lose their fifth Super Bowl against the Seattle Seahawks two years later; whereas the Patriots would lose their fifth six years later and their record-breaking sixth 14 years later.

== Offseason ==
=== 2011 NFL draft ===
The Patriots traded their original seventh-round pick to the Atlanta Falcons for guard Quinn Ojinnaka in August 2010. The Patriots also acquired the Denver Broncos' fourth-round selection in exchange for a sixth-round selection and running back Laurence Maroney. The Patriots acquired the sixth-round selection from the New Orleans Saints in a September 2009 trade for tight end David Thomas. The team later agreed to trade the higher of its two fourth-round selections – the pick acquired from the Broncos – to the Seattle Seahawks in exchange for wide receiver Deion Branch.

2011 New England Patriots draft
Round	Pick	Player	Position	College	Notes
1	17	Nate Solder	Offensive tackle	Colorado	from Oakland
2	33	Ras-I Dowling	Cornerback	Virginia	from Carolina
2	56	Shane Vereen	Running back	California	from New Orleans
3	73	Stevan Ridley	Running back	LSU	
3	74	Ryan Mallett	Quarterback	Arkansas	from Minnesota
5	138	Marcus Cannon	Offensive guard	TCU	from Houston
5	159	Lee Smith	Tight end	Marshall	
6	194	Markell Carter	Outside linebacker	Central Arkansas	from New York Jets via Philadelphia
7	219	Malcolm Williams	Cornerback	TCU	from Oakland
Made roster

2011 New England Patriots Draft Day Trades
Round	Overall	Team	Received
1	28	to New Orleans Saints	Received New Orleans' second-round pick (56 overall) in 2011 and first-round pick in 2012
2	60	to Houston Texans	Received Houston's third-round and fifth-round picks (73 and 138 overall)
3	92	to Oakland Raiders	Received Oakland's seventh-round pick in 2011 (219 overall) and second-round pick in 2012
4	125	to Oakland Raiders	Received Oakland's seventh-round pick in 2011 (219 overall) and second-round pick in 2012
6	193	to Philadelphia Eagles	Received Philadelphia's sixth-round pick (194 overall)

== Staff ==
2011 New England Patriots staff
Front office: Chairman/CEO – Robert Kraft; President – Jonathan Kraft; Senior football advisor – Floyd Reese; Director of player personnel – Nick Caserio; Director of college scouting – Jon Robinson; Director of pro personnel – Jason Licht; Assistant director of pro personnel – Bob Quinn; Assistant director of college scouting – Brian Smith; Football research director – Ernie Adams; Head coaches: Head coach – Bill Belichick; Assistant head coach/offensive line – Dante Scarnecchia; Offensive coaches: Offensive coordinator/quarterbacks – Bill O'Brien; Running backs – Ivan Fears; Wide receivers – Chad O'Shea; Tight ends – Brian Ferentz; Offensive assistant – George Godsey; Offensive assistant – Josh McDaniels (hired during 2011 playoff run)	Defensive coaches: Defensive line – Pepper Johnson; Linebackers – Patrick Graham; Defensive backs – Josh Boyer; Safeties – Matt Patricia; Defensive assistant – Brian Flores; Special teams coaches: Special teams – Scott O'Brien; Strength and conditioning: Head strength and conditioning – Harold Nash; Assistant strength and conditioning – Moses Cabrera

== Final roster ==
2011 New England Patriots roster
Quarterbacks (QB): 12 Tom Brady; 8 Brian Hoyer; 15 Ryan Mallett; Running backs (RB): 33 Kevin Faulk; 42 BenJarvus Green-Ellis; 36 Lousaka Polite FB; 22 Stevan Ridley; 34 Shane Vereen; 39 Danny Woodhead; Wide receivers (WR): 84 Deion Branch; 11 Julian Edelman; 85 Chad Ochocinco; 83 Wes Welker; Tight ends (TE): 87 Rob Gronkowski; 81 Aaron Hernandez	Offensive linemen (OL): 61 Marcus Cannon T; 63 Dan Connolly C; 72 Matt Light T; 70 Logan Mankins G; 65 Nick McDonald C; 77 Nate Solder T; 64 Donald Thomas G; 76 Sebastian Vollmer T; 54 Brian Waters G; 62 Ryan Wendell C; Defensive linemen (DL): 95 Mark Anderson DE; 97 Ron Brace DT; 71 Brandon Deaderick DE; 94 Shaun Ellis DE; 74 Kyle Love DT; 69 Alex Silvestro DE; 98 Gerard Warren DT; 75 Vince Wilfork DT	Linebackers (LB): 52 Dane Fletcher OLB; 59 Gary Guyton MLB; 90 Niko Koutouvides OLB; 51 Jerod Mayo MLB; 50 Rob Ninkovich OLB; 55 Brandon Spikes OLB; 58 Tracy White OLB; Defensive backs (DB): 24 Kyle Arrington CB; 31 Sergio Brown SS; 25 Patrick Chung SS; 44 James Ihedigbo FS; 23 Nate Jones CB; 32 Devin McCourty CB; 27 Antwaun Molden CB; 29 Sterling Moore SS; 18 Matthew Slater SS; 41 Malcolm Williams CB; Special teams (ST): 48 Danny Aiken LS; 3 Stephen Gostkowski K; 14 Zoltán Meskó P	Practice squad: 86 Carson Butler TE; 17 Britt Davis WR; 49 Markell Carter LB; 80 Dorin Dickerson TE (IR); 68 Matt Kopa T; 60 Aaron Lavarias DE; 45 Garrett Mills FB; 47 Mike Rivera LB; 35 Ross Ventrone S; Reserve: 93 Andre Carter DE (IR); 47 Christian Cox MLB (IR); 96 Jermaine Cunningham OLB (IR); 21 Ras-I Dowling CB (IR); -- Kyle Hix T (IR); 67 Dan Koppen C (IR); 60 Rich Ohrnberger G (IR); 91 Myron Pryor DT (IR); 53 Jeff Tarpinian OLB (IR); 99 Mike Wright DT (IR); Rookies in italics 53 active, 11 reserve, 9 practice squad

== Schedule ==
=== Preseason ===
Week	Date	Opponent	Result	Record	Game site	NFL.com recap
1	August 11	Jacksonville Jaguars	W 47–12	1–0	Gillette Stadium	Recap
2	August 18	at Tampa Bay Buccaneers	W 31–14	2–0	Raymond James Stadium	Recap
3	August 27	at Detroit Lions	L 10–34	2–1	Ford Field	Recap
4	September 1	New York Giants	L 17–18	2–2	Gillette Stadium	Recap

=== Regular season ===
Week	Date	Opponent	Result	Record	Game site	NFL.com recap
1	September 12	at Miami Dolphins	W 38–24	1–0	Sun Life Stadium	Recap
2	September 18	San Diego Chargers	W 35–21	2–0	Gillette Stadium	Recap
3	September 25	at Buffalo Bills	L 31–34	2–1	Ralph Wilson Stadium	Recap
4	October 2	at Oakland Raiders	W 31–19	3–1	O.co Coliseum	Recap
5	October 9	New York Jets	W 30–21	4–1	Gillette Stadium	Recap
6	October 16	Dallas Cowboys	W 20–16	5–1	Gillette Stadium	Recap
7	Bye					
8	October 30	at Pittsburgh Steelers	L 17–25	5–2	Heinz Field	Recap
9	November 6	New York Giants	L 20–24	5–3	Gillette Stadium	Recap
10	November 13	at New York Jets	W 37–16	6–3	MetLife Stadium	Recap
11	November 21	Kansas City Chiefs	W 34–3	7–3	Gillette Stadium	Recap
12	November 27	at Philadelphia Eagles	W 38–20	8–3	Lincoln Financial Field	Recap
13	December 4	Indianapolis Colts	W 31–24	9–3	Gillette Stadium	Recap
14	December 11	at Washington Redskins	W 34–27	10–3	FedExField	Recap
15	December 18	at Denver Broncos	W 41–23	11–3	Sports Authority Field at Mile High	Recap
16	December 24	Miami Dolphins	W 27–24	12–3	Gillette Stadium	Recap
17	January 1	Buffalo Bills	W 49–21	13–3	Gillette Stadium	Recap

== Standings ==
AFC East
	W	L	T	PCT	DIV	CONF	PF	PA	STK
^{(1)} New England Patriots	13	3	0	.813	5–1	10–2	513	342	W8
New York Jets	8	8	0	.500	3–3	6–6	377	363	L3
Miami Dolphins	6	10	0	.375	3–3	5–7	329	313	W1
Buffalo Bills	6	10	0	.375	1–5	4–8	372	434	L1

== Regular season results ==
=== Week 1: at Miami Dolphins ===
Week One: New England Patriots at Miami Dolphins – Game summary

Quarter	1	2	3	4	Total
Patriots	7	7	14	10	38
Dolphins	7	0	10	7	24

at Sun Life Stadium, Miami Gardens, Florida

- Date: September 12
- Game time: 7:00 p.m. EDT
- Game weather: 82 °F or 27.8 °C, partly cloudy
- Game attendance: 66,860
- Referee: Pete Morelli
- TV announcers (ESPN): Mike Tirico, Jon Gruden & Ron Jaworski, Suzy Kolber & Wendi Nix

Game information

First quarter

- MIA – Chad Henne 9-yard run (Dan Carpenter kick), Dolphins 7–0, Drive: 12 plays, 84 yards, 7:18.
- NE – BenJarvus Green-Ellis 4-yard run (Stephen Gostkowski kick), Tied 7–7, Drive: 6 plays, 78 yards, 3:28.

Second quarter

- NE – Rob Gronkowski 10-yard reception from Tom Brady (Stephen Gostkowski kick), Patriots 14–7, Drive: 7 plays, 65 yards, 2:54

Third quarter

- MIA – Brian Hartline 10-yard reception from Chad Henne (Dan Carpenter kick), Tied 14–14, Drive: 2 plays, 9 yards, 0:44
- NE – Wes Welker 2-yard reception from Tom Brady (Stephen Gostkowski kick), Patriots 21–14, Drive: 10 plays, 73 yards, 4:06
- MIA – Dan Carpenter 20-yard field goal, Patriots 21-17, Drive: 10 plays, 87 yards, 4:47.
- NE – Aaron Hernandez 1-yard reception from Tom Brady (Stephen Gostkowski kick), Patriots 28–17, Drive: 8 plays, 78 yards, 3:26

Fourth quarter

- NE – Stephen Gostkowski 20-yard field goal, Patriots 31–17, Drive: 9 plays, 62 yards, 3:35.
- NE – Wes Welker 99-yard reception from Tom Brady (Stephen Gostkowski kick), Patriots 38–17, Drive: 1 plays, 99 yards, 0:13
- MIA – Reggie Bush 2-yard reception from Chad Henne (Dan Carpenter kick), Patriots 38–24, Drive: 8 plays, 74 yards, 2:05

Top passers

- NE – Tom Brady – 32/48, 517 yards, 4 TDs
- MIA – Chad Henne – 30/49, 416 yards, 2 TDs

Top rushers

- NE – Danny Woodhead – 14 rushes, 69 yards
- MIA – Chad Henne – 7 rushes, 59 yards, 1 TD

Top receivers

- NE – Wes Welker – 8 receptions, 160 yards, 2 TDs
- MIA – Brandon Marshall – 7 receptions, 139 yards

Top tacklers

- NE – Devin McCourty – 10 tackles, 1 assist
- MIA – Reshad Jones – 8 tackles, 4 assists

The Patriots began their 2011 campaign at Sun Life Stadium, for a Week 1 AFC East duel with the Miami Dolphins in the first game of Monday Night Football's doubleheader. New England trailed early in the first quarter as Dolphins' quarterback Chad Henne scrambled for 9-yard touchdown. The Patriots answered, with a 4-yard touchdown run from running back BenJarvus Green-Ellis. New England took the lead in the second quarter, with quarterback Tom Brady finding tight end Rob Gronkowski on a 10-yard touchdown pass. Miami tied the game in third quarter, as Henne completed a 10-yard touchdown pass to wide receiver Brian Hartline, yet the Patriots regained the lead, with Brady hooking up with wide receiver Wes Welker on a 2-yard touchdown pass. The Dolphins would reply, with a 20-yard field goal by placekicker Dan Carpenter. Afterwards, New England closed out the third quarter, with Brady connecting with tight end Aaron Hernandez on a 1-yard touchdown pass. The Patriots added onto their lead in the fourth quarter, with a 20-yard field goal from placekicker Stephen Gostkowski, followed by Brady finding Welker on a 99-yard touchdown pass. Miami would close out the game with Henne completing a 2-yard touchdown pass to running back Reggie Bush.

With the win, New England began their season at 1–0. Tom Brady also became the 11th quarterback in NFL history to pass for over 500 yards in a game with 517 yards.

=== Week 2: vs. San Diego Chargers ===
Week Two: San Diego Chargers at New England Patriots – Game summary

Quarter	1	2	3	4	Total
Chargers	7	0	0	14	21
Patriots	7	13	0	15	35

at Gillette Stadium, Foxborough, Massachusetts

- Date: September 18
- Game time: 4:15 p.m. EDT/1:15 pm. PDT
- Game weather: 63 °F (17 °C) (Wind)
- Game attendance: 68,756
- Referee: Walt Anderson
- TV announcers (CBS): Jim Nantz and Phil Simms

Game information

First quarter

- NE – Aaron Hernandez 14-yard pass from Tom Brady (Stephen Gostowski kick), (NE 7–0)
- SD – Ryan Matthews 10-yard run (Nick Novak kick), (Tied 7–7)

Second quarter

- NE – Stephen Gostowski 22-yard field goal, (NE 10–7)
- NE – Rob Gronkowski 10-yard pass from Tom Brady (Stephen Gostowski kick), (NE 17–7)
- NE – Stephen Gostowski 47-yard field goal, (NE 20–7)

Third quarter No Scoring Fourth quarter

- SD – Vincent Jackson 3-yard pass from Phillip Rivers (Nick Novak kick), (NE 20–14)
- NE – Rob Gronkowski 17-yard pass from Tom Brady (Danny Woodhead run), (NE 28–14)
- SD – Vincent Jackson 26-yard pass from Phillip Rivers (Nick Novak kick), (NE 28–21)
- NE – BenJarvus Green-Ellis 16-yard run (Stephen Gostowski kick), (NE 35–21)

Top passers

- SD – Phillip Rivers – 29/40, 378 yards, 2 TD, 2 INT
- NE – Tom Brady – 31/40, 423 yards, 3 TD

Top rushers

- SD – Ryan Matthews – 12 rushes, 64 yards, TD
- NE – BenJarvus Green Ellis – 17 rushes, 70 yards, TD

Top receivers

- SD – Vincent Jackson – 10 receptions, 172 yards, 2 TD
- NE – Deion Branch – 8 receptions, 129 yards

Following their Monday Night at Miami, the Patriots returned to Foxborough for their home opener against the San Diego Chargers. In the first quarter, Patriots' quarterback Tom Brady threw a 14-yard touchdown pass to tight end Aaron Hernandez, but the Chargers responded, with a 10-yard touchdown run by running back Ryan Mathews. The Patriots scored 13 unanswered points in the second quarter, with a 22-yard field goal by placekicker Stephen Gostkowski, a 10-yard touchdown pass from Brady to tight end Rob Gronkowski, followed by a 47-yard field goal by Gostkowski just before halftime. After a scoreless third quarter, the Chargers cut into the Patriots lead, with a 3-yard touchdown pass from quarterback Philip Rivers to wide receiver Vincent Jackson. The Patriots responded, with Brady throwing a 17-yard touchdown pass to Rob Gronkowski (and a two-point conversion run by running back Danny Woodhead). The Chargers tried to rally, with Rivers throwing a 26-yard touchdown pass to Jackson, but a 16-yard touchdown run by Patriots' running back BenJarvus Green-Ellis just after the two-minute warning sealed the win for New England.

With the win, the Patriots improved to 2–0.

=== Week 3: at Buffalo Bills ===
Quarter	1	2	3	4	Total
Patriots	14	7	3	7	31
Bills	0	10	7	17	34

at Ralph Wilson Stadium, Orchard Park, New York

- Game time: 1:00 p.m. EDT
- Game weather: 78 °F (26 °C), Mix of sun and clouds
- Game attendance: 68,174
- Referee: Carl Cheffers
- TV announcers (CBS): Marv Albert (play-by-play) and Rich Gannon (color commentator)

Following their win over the Chargers, the Patriots flew to Orchard Park, New York, for an AFC East duel with the Buffalo Bills. The Patriots grabbed the lead in the first quarter, with quarterback Tom Brady throwing two touchdown passes – a 14-yarder to wide receiver Wes Welker and a 1-yarder to tight end Rob Gronkowski. The Patriots added to their lead in the second quarter, with Brady connecting with Rob Gronkowski on a 26-yard touchdown pass. The Patriots lead was now 21-0 halfway through the second quarter. The Bills responded, with quarterback Ryan Fitzpatrick throwing an 11-yard touchdown pass to wide receiver Stevie Johnson, followed by a 42-yard field goal by placekicker Rian Lindell. The Bills narrowed the Patriots' lead in the third quarter, with a 3-yard touchdown pass from Fitzpatrick to tight end Scott Chandler. The Patriots increased their lead, with a 23-yard field goal by placekicker Stephen Gostkowski. The Bills tied the game in the fourth quarter, with a 1-yard touchdown run by running back Fred Jackson, then grabbed a 31–24 lead when cornerback Drayton Florence returned a Brady interception 27 yards for a touchdown. The Patriots tied the game, with a 6-yard touchdown pass from Brady to Welker. However, the Bills got the last possession, and after a touchdown that was ruled that Fred Jackson's knee hit the ground before he was in the endzone, the Bills killed clock by draining time and making the Patriots use timeouts. The Bills then won as Lindell nailed a 28-yard field goal as time expired, snapping the Patriots' 15-game winning streak against the Bills.

With the loss, the Patriots dropped to 2–1.

=== Week 4: at Oakland Raiders ===
Quarter	1	2	3	4	Total
Patriots	7	10	7	7	31
Raiders	3	7	3	6	19

at O.co Coliseum, Oakland, California

- Game time: 4:15 p.m. EDT/1:15 p.m. PDT
- Game weather: 71 °F (22 °C), Sunny
- Game attendance: 62,572
- Referee: Tony Corrente
- TV announcers (CBS): Kevin Harlan (play-by-play) and Solomon Wilcots (color commentator)

Hoping to avenge their Week 3 loss at Buffalo, the Patriots flew across the country to face the Oakland Raiders. The Raiders grabbed the lead in the first quarter, with a 28-yard field goal by placekicker Sebastian Janikowski. The Patriots responded, with quarterback Tom Brady throwing a 15-yard touchdown pass to wide receiver Wes Welker. The Raiders re-claimed the lead in the second quarter, with a 1-yard touchdown run from running back Michael Bush. The Patriots answered, with a 1-yard touchdown run from running back BenJarvus Green-Ellis, followed by a 44-yard field goal by placekicker Stephen Gostkowski just before halftime. The Patriots added to their lead in the third quarter, with a 33-yard TD-run by running back Stevan Ridley. The Raiders narrowed the lead, with a 26-yard field goal by Janikowski, but the Patriots increased it in the fourth quarter, with a 4-yard touchdown pass from Brady to wide receiver Deion Branch. The Raiders scored a late touchdown, with quarterback Jason Campbell throwing a 6-yard pass to wide receiver Denarius Moore (with a failed two-point conversion attempt), but the Patriots ran out the clock, sealing the win.

With the win, the Patriots improved to 3–1; it was also the franchise's 200th win (regular season and playoff) under Robert Kraft's ownership.

=== Week 5: vs. New York Jets ===
Week Five: New York Jets at New England Patriots – Game summary

Quarter	1	2	3	4	Total
Jets	0	7	7	7	21
Patriots	7	3	14	6	30

at Gillette Stadium, Foxborough, Massachusetts

- Date: October 9
- Game time: 4:15 p.m. EDT
- Game weather: 82 °F (28 °C), sunny and warm
- Game attendance: 68,756
- Referee: Jerome Boger
- TV announcers (CBS): Jim Nantz and Phil Simms
- Recap, Gamebook

Game information

First quarter

- BenJarvus Green-Ellis 3-yard run (Stephen Gostkowski Kick) Patriots 7–0, Drive: 5 plays, 64 yards, 2:34.

Second quarter

- Stephen Gostkowski 44-yard field goal Patriots 10–0, Drive: 6 plays, 18 yards, 3:06.
- Shonn Greene 3-yard run (Nick Folk Kick) Patriots 10–7, Drive: 13 plays, 78 yards, 7:54.

Third quarter

- Deion Branch 2-yard pass from Tom Brady (Stephen Gostkowski Kick) Patriots 17–7, Drive: 4 plays, 80 yards, 2:14.
- Jeremy Kerley 9-yard pass from Mark Sanchez (Nick Folk Kick) Patriots 17–14, Drive: 3 plays, 20 yards, 1:43.
- BenJarvus Green-Ellis 3-yard run (Stephen Gostkowski Kick) Patriots 24–14, Drive: 11 plays, 77 yards, 4:12.

Fourth quarter

- Stephen Gostkowski 24-yard field goal Patriots 27–14, Drive: 6 plays, 19 yards, 2:17.
- Santonio Holmes 21-yard pass from Mark Sanchez (Nick Folk Kick) Patriots 27–21, Drive: 11 plays, 85 yards, 5:43.
- Stephen Gostkowski 28-yard field goal Patriots 30–21, Drive: 13 plays, 69 yards, 6:12.

Top passers

- NYJ – Mark Sanchez- 16/26, 166 yards, 2TD
- NE – Tom Brady- 24/33, 321 yards, 1TD 1INT

Top rushers

- NYJ – Shonn Greene- 21 rushes, 83 yards, 1TD
- NE – BenJarvus Green-Ellis- 27 rushes, 136 yards, 2TD

Top receivers

- NYJ – Santonio Holmes- 4 receptions, 60 yards, 1TD
- NE – Wes Welker- 5 receptions, 124 yards

Top tacklers

- NYJ – David Harris- 9 tackles, 1 sack, 1 tackle for loss
  Eric Smith- 9 tackles, 1 tackle for loss
- NE – Gary Guyton- 9 tackles
  Patrick Chung- 9 tackles

Coming off their win at Oakland, the Patriots returned home for an AFC East duel with the New York Jets. The Patriots grabbed the early lead in the first quarter, with a 3-yard touchdown run by running back BenJarvus Green-Ellis, followed in the second quarter by a 44-yard field goal by placekicker Stephen Gostkowski. The Jets got on the board, with a 3-yard touchdown run by running back Shonn Greene. The Patriots extended their lead in the third quarter, with quarterback Tom Brady throwing a 2-yard touchdown pass to wide receiver Deion Branch. The Jets responded, with quarterback Mark Sanchez throwing a 9-yard touchdown pass to wide receiver Jeremy Kerley. The Patriots added to their lead, with a 3-yard touchdown run by Green-Ellis, followed in the fourth quarter with a 24-yard field goal by Gostkowski. The Jets tried to rally, with wide receiver Santonio Holmes receiving a 21-yard touchdown pass from Sanchez, but a late 28-yard field goal by Gostkowski sealed the win for the Patriots.

With the win, the Patriots improved to 4–1.

=== Week 6: vs. Dallas Cowboys ===
Week Six: Dallas Cowboys at New England Patriots – Game summary

Quarter	1	2	3	4	Total
Cowboys	3	7	3	3	16
Patriots	3	10	0	7	20

at Gillette Stadium, Foxborough, Massachusetts

- Date: October 16
- Game time: 4:15 p.m. EDT/3:15 p.m. CDT
- Game weather: 63 °F (17 °C) (Partly Cloudy)
- Game attendance: 68,756
- Referee: Walt Coleman
- TV announcers (Fox): Thom Brennaman, Troy Aikman and Pam Oliver

Game information

First quarter

- NE - Stephen Gostkowski 31-yard field goal
- DAL - Dan Bailey 48-yard field goal

Second quarter

- NE - Stephen Gostkowski 26-yard field goal
- NE - Wes Welker 5-yard pass from Tom Brady
- DAL - Jason Witten 1-yard pass from Tony Romo

Third quarter

- DAL - Dan Bailey 22-yard field goal

Fourth quarter

- DAL - Dan Bailey 26-yard field goal
- NE - Aaron Hernandez 8-yard pass from Tom Brady

Top passers

- DAL – Tony Romo - 27/41, 317 yards, 1 touchdown, 1 interception
- NE – Tom Brady - 27/41, 289 yards, 2 touchdowns, 2 interceptions

Top rushers

- DAL – DeMarco Murray - 11 rushes, 34 yards
- NE – BenJarvus Green-Ellis - 14 rushes, 58 yards

Top receivers

- DAL – Dez Bryant - 4 receptions, 78 yards
- NE – Rob Gronkowski - 7 receptions, 74 yards

Top tacklers

- DAL – Sean Lee - 12 tackles
- NE – Kyle Arrington - 11 tackles

Coming off their win over the Jets, the Patriots remained on home turf for an interconference duel with the Dallas Cowboys. The Patriots, wearing their white jerseys as to force the Cowboys to don their "unlucky" blue jerseys, took the early lead in the first quarter, with a 31-yard field goal by placekicker Stephen Gostkowski. The Cowboys countered, with a 48-yard field goal by placekicker Dan Bailey. The Patriots responded in the second quarter, with a 26-yard field goal by Gostkowski, followed by a 5-yard touchdown pass from quarterback Tom Brady to wide receiver Wes Welker. The Cowboys narrowed the Patriots' lead just before halftime, with a 1-yard touchdown pass from quarterback Tony Romo to tight end Jason Witten. The Cowboys tied the game at 13–13 in the third quarter, with a 22-yard field goal by Bailey, then grabbed the lead in the fourth quarter with another field goal by Bailey, this time from 26 yards. With 2:31 remaining in the fourth quarter, Brady engineered a comeback, culminating with an 8-yard touchdown pass to tight end Aaron Hernandez with 22 seconds remaining. The Cowboys tried to rally, but Romo's last-second desperation hail-mary pass toward the end zone was unsuccessful, sealing the win for the Patriots.

With the win, the Patriots improved to 5–1, entering their bye week.

=== Week 8: at Pittsburgh Steelers ===
Quarter	1	2	3	4	Total
Patriots	0	10	0	7	17
Steelers	7	10	3	5	25

at Heinz Field, Pittsburgh, Pennsylvania

- Game time: 4:15 p.m. EDT
- Game weather: 40 °F (4 °C), cloudy
- Game attendance: 64,424
- Referee: Mike Carey
- TV announcers (CBS): Jim Nantz (play-by-play) and Phil Simms (color commentator)

Tom Brady’s 150th regular season start. Coming off their bye week, the Patriots flew to Heinz Field for a Week 8 duel with the Pittsburgh Steelers. New England trailed early in the first quarter, as Steelers quarterback Ben Roethlisberger completed a 5-yard touchdown pass to running back Mewelde Moore. Pittsburgh would add to their lead in the second quarter, as placekicker Shaun Suisham nailed a 33-yard field goal. The Patriots answered, with quarterback Tom Brady finding wide receiver Deion Branch on a 2-yard touchdown pass, but the Steelers came right back, with Roethlisberger completing a 7-yard touchdown pass to wide receiver Antonio Brown. New England would close out the half with a 46-yard field goal from placekicker Stephen Gostkowski.

Pittsburgh began the third quarter with Suisham making a 21-yard field goal, followed by a 23-yard field goal in the fourth. The Patriots tried to rally, as Brady connected with tight end Aaron Hernandez on a 1-yard touchdown pass, but the Steelers' defense would prevail, with safety Troy Polamalu forcing a New England fumble out of the back of the end zone for a safety.

With the loss, the Patriots fell to 5–2, being the first defeat by the Steelers with Tom Brady starting at quarterback in the previous seven seasons. This would be their final loss to the Steelers until 2018.

=== Week 9: vs. New York Giants ===
Quarter	1	2	3	4	Total
Giants	0	0	10	14	24
Patriots	0	0	3	17	20

at Gillette Stadium, Foxborough, Massachusetts

- Game time: 4:15 p.m. EST
- Game weather: 54 °F (12 °C), sunny and cool
- Game attendance: 68,756
- Referee: Pete Morelli
- TV announcers (Fox): Joe Buck (play-by-play), Troy Aikman (color commentator), and Pam Oliver (sideline reporter)

Hoping to rebound from their loss at Pittsburgh, the Patriots returned home for an interconference duel with the New York Giants, the first meeting since Super Bowl XLII where the Giants stopped their chances at going 19–0. After a scoreless first half, the Giants grabbed the lead in the third quarter, with a 22-yard field goal by placekicker Lawrence Tynes, followed by a 10-yard touchdown run by running back Brandon Jacobs. The Patriots got on the board, with a 32-yard field goal by placekicker Stephen Gostkowski. In the fourth quarter, the Patriots tied the game, with a 5-yard touchdown pass from quarterback Tom Brady to tight end Aaron Hernandez, then took the lead with a 45-yard field goal by Gostkowski. The Giants re-claimed the lead, with a 10-yard touchdown pass from quarterback Eli Manning to wide receiver Mario Manningham with three minutes remaining. The Patriots responded, with a 14-yard touchdown pass from Brady to tight end Rob Gronkowski. However, with a minute and a half remaining in a similar repeat of Super Bowl XLII, Manning led the Giants on a game-winning drive, culminating with a 1-yard touchdown pass to tight end Jake Ballard.

With the loss, the Patriots dropped to 5–3, and QB Tom Brady's streak of 32 consecutive home wins was snapped. Following the game the Patriots released Albert Haynesworth, who'd reportedly gotten into a sideline confrontation with assistant coach Pepper Johnson. The loss was the third time in nine seasons the Patriots had suffered consecutive losses, and only the second time the team has lost to an NFC team at Gillette Stadium. This was the 1st time the Patriots had a 2-game losing streak since Week 12 and Week 13 in 2009. It was also the Patriots' first regular season loss at home since November 30, 2008, when they lost to that year's eventual Super Bowl champions, the Pittsburgh Steelers.

The Giants and the Patriots would meet again in Super Bowl XLVI with the Giants winning 21–17.

=== Week 10: at New York Jets ===
Quarter	1	2	3	4	Total
Patriots	6	7	10	14	37
Jets	0	9	0	7	16

at MetLife Stadium, East Rutherford, New Jersey

- Game time: 8:20 p.m. EST
- Game weather: 58 °F (14 °C), clear
- Game attendance: 79,088
- Referee: Gene Steratore
- TV announcers (NBC): Al Michaels (play-by-play), Cris Collinsworth (color commentator), and Michele Tafoya (sideline reporter)

Hoping to rebound from their loss to the Giants, the Patriots flew to MetLife Stadium for an AFC East rematch with the New York Jets. The Patriots grabbed the lead in the first quarter, with field goals of 50 and 36 yards by placekicker Stephen Gostkowski. The Jets got on the board in the second quarter, when Patriots' quarterback Tom Brady was penalized for intentional grounding in the end zone for a safety, followed by Jets' quarterback Mark Sanchez scrambling for a 2-yard touchdown. The Patriots re-claimed the lead just before halftime, with Brady connecting with tight end Rob Gronkowski on an 18-yard touchdown pass. The Patriots added to their lead in the third quarter, with a 27-yard field goal by Gostkowski, followed by a 5-yard touchdown pass from Brady to Gronkowski. In the fourth quarter, the Jets cut into the Patriots' lead, with a 7-yard touchdown pass from Sanchez to wide receiver Plaxico Burress. The Patriots responded, with an 8-yard touchdown pass from Brady to wide receiver Deion Branch, then pulled away when linebacker Rob Ninkovich returned a Sanchez interception 12 yards for a touchdown.

With the win, the Patriots improved to 6–3 and swept the Jets for the first time since 2007.

=== Week 11: vs. Kansas City Chiefs ===
Quarter	1	2	3	4	Total
Chiefs	3	0	0	0	3
Patriots	0	10	17	7	34

at Gillette Stadium, Foxborough, Massachusetts

- Game time: 8:30 p.m. EST
- Game weather: 33 °F (1 °C), clear and cold
- Game attendance: 68,756
- Referee: Clete Blakeman
- TV announcers (ESPN): Mike Tirico (play-by-play), Ron Jaworski and Jon Gruden (color commentators), and Suzy Kolber (sideline reporter)

Coming off their win over the Jets, the Patriots returned home for an AFC duel against the Kansas City Chiefs on Monday Night Football. Kansas City took the lead in the first quarter, with a 26-yard field goal by placekicker Ryan Succop, in what would be the Chiefs' only score of the game. The Patriots grabbed the lead in the second quarter, with a 52-yard touchdown pass from quarterback Tom Brady to tight end Rob Gronkowski, followed by a 21-yard field goal by placekicker Stephen Gostkowski just before halftime. The Patriots added to their lead in the third quarter, with Brady throwing another touchdown pass to Gronkowski – this time from 19 yards, followed by Julian Edelman returning a punt 72 yards for a touchdown, and a 19-yard field goal by Gostkowski at the end of the third quarter. The Patriots added another score near the end of the game, with a 4-yard touchdown run by running back Shane Vereen.

With the win, the Patriots improved to 7–3.

=== Week 12: at Philadelphia Eagles ===
Quarter	1	2	3	4	Total
Patriots	7	17	7	7	38
Eagles	10	3	0	7	20

at Lincoln Financial Field, Philadelphia, Pennsylvania

- Game time: 4:15 p.m. EST
- Game weather: 63 °F (17 °C), cloudy
- Game attendance: 69,144
- Referee: Jerome Boger
- TV announcers (CBS): Greg Gumbel (play-by-play) and Dan Dierdorf (color commentator)

Coming off their win over the Chiefs, the Patriots flew to Lincoln Financial Field for an interconference duel with the Philadelphia Eagles. The Eagles grabbed the early lead in the first quarter, with a 2-yard touchdown run by running back LeSean McCoy, followed by a 43-yard field goal by placekicker Alex Henery. The Patriots then reeled off 21 unanswered points, with two touchdown runs by running back BenJarvus Green-Ellis – a 4-yarder followed in the second quarter by a 1-yarder, and a 41-yard touchdown pass from quarterback Tom Brady to wide receiver Wes Welker. Each team exchanged field goals – a 22-yarder by Henery, and a 45-yarder by Patriots' placekicker Stephen Gostkowski, giving the Patriots a 24–13 halftime lead. The Patriots added to their lead, with Brady throwing a pair of touchdown passes – a 9-yarder to Welker in the third quarter, followed in the fourth quarter by a 24-yarder to tight end Rob Gronkowski. The Eagles scored late, with quarterback Vince Young throwing a 1-yard touchdown pass to wide receiver Jason Avant, but the Patriots' lead was too much for the Eagles to overcome.

With the win, the Patriots improved to 8–3.

=== Week 13: vs. Indianapolis Colts ===
Quarter	1	2	3	4	Total
Colts	0	3	0	21	24
Patriots	3	14	14	0	31

at Gillette Stadium, Foxborough, Massachusetts

- Game time: 1:00 p.m. EST
- Game weather: 51 °F (11 °C), cloudy
- Game attendance: 68,756
- Referee: Ron Winter
- TV announcers (CBS): Marv Albert (play-by-play) and Rich Gannon (color commentator)

Coming off their win over the Eagles, the Patriots returned home for an AFC duel with the Indianapolis Colts. The Patriots took the early lead, with a 39-yard field goal by Stephen Gostkowski, before placekicker and former Patriots Super Bowl hero Adam Vinatieri hit back with a 31-yard field goal of his own early in the second quarter. The Patriots then reeled off 28 unanswered points, starting with quarterback Tom Brady tossing an 11-yard touchdown pass to tight end Rob Gronkowski, a 1-yard touchdown run by running back BenJarvus Green-Ellis just before halftime, then Brady threw two more touchdown passes to Gronkowski in the third quarter – a 21-yarder followed by a 2-yarder. In the fourth quarter, the Patriots were held scoreless and the Colts reeled off 21 unanswered points – a 5-yard touchdown run by running back Donald Brown, followed by two touchdown passes from Dan Orlovsky to wide receiver Pierre Garçon – a 33-yarder and a 12-yarder – the latter with 36 seconds remaining in regulation. Despite the touchdowns, one of Garçon's catches in the end zone was accompanied with an angry throw at a sign with a target meant for Gronkowski's trademark spike.

A Colts' onside kick attempt near the end of the contest was unsuccessful, sealing the win for the Patriots.

With the win, the Patriots improved to 9–3.

=== Week 14: at Washington Redskins ===
Quarter	1	2	3	4	Total
Patriots	14	6	14	0	34
Redskins	10	10	7	0	27

at FedExField, Landover, Maryland

- Game time: 1:00 p.m. EST
- Game weather: 40 °F (4 °C), sunny
- Game attendance: 77,825
- Referee: Jeff Triplette
- TV announcers (CBS): Greg Gumbel (play-by-play) and Dan Dierdorf (color commentator)

Coming off their close win over the Colts, the Patriots flew to FedExField for an interconference duel with the Washington Redskins. The Patriots grabbed the early lead, when defensive tackle Vince Wilfork recovered a fumble off Redskins' quarterback Rex Grossman in the end zone for a touchdown.

The Redskins responded with a 24-yard field goal by placekicker Graham Gano. The Patriots added to their lead, with quarterback Tom Brady throwing an 11-yard touchdown pass to tight end Rob Gronkowski. The Redskins countered, with Grossman throwing a 9-yard touchdown pass to wide receiver Jabar Gaffney, then grabbed the lead early in the second quarter, with wide receiver Brandon Banks throwing a 49-yard touchdown pass to wide receiver Santana Moss.

The Patriots tied the game with a 23-yard field goal by placekicker Stephen Gostkowski. The Redskins countered with a 25-yard field goal by Gano, and a 24-yard field goal by Gostskowski just before halftime tied the game at 20. The Patriots grabbed the lead early in the third quarter, with a 37-yard touchdown pass from Brady to Gronkowski, but the Redskins countered again, with Grossman throwing a 6-yard touchdown pass to wide receiver David Anderson.

The final scoring play of the game came from the Patriots, with Brady connecting with wide receiver Wes Welker on a 24-yard touchdown. Both teams were held scoreless in the fourth quarter, which included linebacker Jerod Mayo intercepting Grossman at the Patriots' 5-yard line with 29 seconds remaining.

Brady was intercepted in the Redskins endzone on a pass intended for Tiquan Underwood; Brady's sideline argument with Underwood led to a quick but spirited showdown with assistant coach Bill O'Brien that resulted in intervention by Bill Belichick – all of it caught by CBS Sports cameras.

With the win, the Patriots improved to 10–3.

=== Week 15: at Denver Broncos ===
Quarter	1	2	3	4	Total
Patriots	7	20	7	7	41
Broncos	13	3	0	7	23

at Sports Authority Field at Mile High, Denver, Colorado

- Game time: 4:15 p.m. EST/2:15 p.m. MST
- Game weather: 63 °F (17 °C), mostly sunny
- Game attendance: 76,556
- Referee: Mike Carey
- TV announcers (CBS): Jim Nantz (play-by-play) and Phil Simms (color commentator)

Denver surged into playoff contention led by second-year quarterback Tim Tebow. Entering this Broncos-Patriots match the Broncos had won seven straight and the dramatic play of Tebow had become a national craze. The game was one of the most highly anticipated games of the 2011 season; CBS aired the game in more markets than any other NFL game they aired in 2011. The game had the highest ratings of any regular-season game on CBS since the Patriots' 2007 victory over the Colts.

Denver got out to an early lead on rushing scores by Tebow and Lance Ball for a 16–7 lead, belying their recent trend of slow starts and late comebacks; However, several fumbles in the second quarter were converted into scores by Tom Brady and a solid 11-point lead at halftime. The Broncos battled back, as Tim Tebow avoided a safety early in the fourth quarter, but a touchdown by BenJarvus Green-Ellis with four minutes left proved to be the game clincher, though the Broncos would get a touchdown back later in the fourth.

The Patriots' win improved them to 11–3 and helped them clinch the AFC East division title for the ninth time in 11 seasons; even if they had lost, they still would have clinched the division with the New York Jets' loss to the Eagles in a game concurrent with New England's matchup in Denver.

=== Week 16: vs. Miami Dolphins ===
Quarter	1	2	3	4	Total
Dolphins	3	14	0	7	24
Patriots	0	0	17	10	27

at Gillette Stadium, Foxborough, Massachusetts

- Game time: 1:00 p.m. EST
- Game weather: 30 °F (−1 °C), sunny and cold
- Game attendance: 68,756
- Referee: Alberto Riveron
- TV announcers (CBS): Ian Eagle (play-by-play) and Dan Fouts (color commentator)

Following the national attention from the previous week, the Patriots found themselves playing mainly for home-field advantage in the playoffs against a Dolphins team that had already been eliminated from playoff contention and could gain pride as their only consolation.

Early on, the Dolphins struck first, putting a field goal through the uprights to open scoring. In the second quarter Matt Moore raced the Dolphins downfield and connected on touchdowns to Brandon Marshall and Charles Clay for a 17–0 halftime lead. The Patriots crossed the 50-yard line in the first half only once, but after a Stephen Gostkowski field goal the Patriots forced a Moore fumble, leading to a Deion Branch touchdown catch. Moore was sacked on Miami's next possession and the Dolphins had to punt; the Patriots drove down and Tom Brady ran in a quarterback sneak touchdown that tied the game. Devin McCourty intercepted a deep Moore pass and the Patriots booted a 42-yard field goal for their first lead of the game. A second Brady quarterback sneak score and a late Davone Bess touchdown catch put the score at 27–24, and the Patriots were able to keep the ball the final 1:48 for the win as the team improved to 12–3 and secured them a playoff bye.

=== Week 17: vs. Buffalo Bills ===
Quarter	1	2	3	4	Total
Bills	21	0	0	0	21
Patriots	0	14	14	21	49

at Gillette Stadium, Foxborough, Massachusetts

- Game time: 1:00 p.m. EST
- Game weather: 51 °F (11 °C), sunny and warm
- Game attendance: 68,756
- Referee: Bill Leavy
- TV announcers (CBS): Don Criqui (play-by-play) and Randy Cross (color commentator)

The Bills raced to a 21–0 lead in the first quarter on two Ryan Fitzpatrick touchdown throws and a Tashard Choice four-yard run. But from the end of the first quarter the Patriots took over the game, led by three Tom Brady touchdown throws, two rushing scores by BenJarvus Green-Ellis, and a Sterling Moore interception return score; the Moore touchdown was the fourth interception of the game thrown by Fitzpatrick.

A loss in this game would have left New England tied with the Baltimore Ravens at 12–4, and in the #2 seed due to Baltimore's superior strength-of-victory. But with the win, the Patriots ended their season 13–3, thereby securing homefield advantage throughout the AFC playoffs.

According to the Pro Football Reference site, in this game the Patriots tied the record for the biggest deficit after one quarter while winning the game, becoming the eighth team to come back from a 21-point deficit after one quarter (no team has ever come back from a greater margin). They also became the first team to overcome such a deficit and win the game by more than 8 points. It was the biggest comeback win by the Patriots since their 2002 comeback win from down 27–6 to the Bears.

== Postseason schedule ==
Week	Kickoff	Date	Opponent	Result	Record	Game Site	TV	NFL.com Recap
Wild Card	Bye							
Divisional	8:00 PM EST	January 14, 2012	Denver Broncos	W 45–10	14–3	Gillette Stadium	CBS	Recap
AFC Championship	3:00 PM EST	January 22, 2012	Baltimore Ravens	W 23–20	15–3	Gillette Stadium	CBS	Recap
Super Bowl XLVI	6:25 PM EST	February 5, 2012	New York Giants	L 17–21	15–4	Lucas Oil Stadium	NBC	Recap

== Postseason results ==
=== Divisional Round vs. Denver Broncos ===
Quarter	1	2	3	4	Total
Broncos	0	7	3	0	10
Patriots	14	21	7	3	45

at Gillette Stadium, Foxborough, Massachusetts

- Game time: 8:00 p.m. EST
- Referee: Gene Steratore
- TV announcers (CBS): Jim Nantz (play-by-play), Phil Simms (color commentator) and Steve Tasker (sideline reporter)

Tom Brady tied an NFL playoff record by throwing six touchdown passes in a playoff game. He tied Daryle Lamonica's six scores in the Oakland Raiders' 1969 Divisional round victory over the Houston Oilers and Steve Young's six scores in Super Bowl XXIX over San Diego; his five touchdowns in the first half tied an NFL playoff record with Sid Luckman, Lamonica, Joe Montana, Kurt Warner, Kerry Collins, and Peyton Manning. Brady also punted the ball on third down late in the fourth quarter which pinned the Broncos inside their own 10-yard line; following the punt a brief brawl erupted between the two teams.

A week after his dramatic overtime victory over the Steelers, Tim Tebow was sacked five times and limited to 136 passing yards and 13 rushing yards; at halftime, Tebow had fewer completions (three) than Brady had touchdowns (five).

With the win, the Patriots improved to 14–3, and secured their first playoff win since 2007. In addition to Brady's record-tying six touchdowns, Rob Gronkowski set a club record with three touchdown catches in a playoff game, breaking the 1986 record of two by Stanley Morgan; Gronkowski is also only the second tight end with three touchdowns in an NFL postseason game. The win was also the first Patriots playoff win (in three tries) over the Broncos and the first two-game sweep of Denver by the Patriots since their 1964 AFL season. This would mark the Patriots last playoff win over Denver until 2025.

=== AFC Championship vs. Baltimore Ravens ===
Quarter	1	2	3	4	Total
Ravens	0	10	10	0	20
Patriots	3	10	3	7	23

at Gillette Stadium, Foxborough, Massachusetts

- Game time: 3:00 p.m. EST
- Referee: Alberto Riveron
- TV announcers (CBS): Jim Nantz (play-by-play) Phil Simms (color commentator) and Steve Tasker (sideline reporter)

Following two Ravens punts and a Patriots punt the Patriots ground out a 13-play 50-yard drive ending in a Stephen Gostkowski field goal. The Ravens tied the game after a Ladarius Webb interception on Billy Cundiff's 20-yard field goal. A BenJarvus Green-Ellis rushing score, a six-yard Joe Flacco touchdown to Dennis Pitta, and another Gostkowski field goal left the Patriots ahead 13–10 at the half. Following a third Gostkowski field goal the Ravens took a 17–16 lead on a 29-yard Torrey Smith touchdown catch and run straddling the right sideline. Danny Woodhead's fumble of the ensuing kickoff led to another Cundiff field goal, then the Patriots clawed back ahead on a 10-play 67-yard drive ending in a one-yard Tom Brady touchdown leap. Brandon Spikes intercepted Flacco at midfield but Brady was then intercepted in the Ravens endzone one play later by Jimmy Smith. Despite failing on 4th and 6 at the Patriots 33-yard line, the Ravens got the ball back with 1:44 to go in the game. Lee Evans nearly caught a touchdown but the ball was swatted out of his hands in the endzone by Sterling Moore, and with 11 seconds to go Cundiff's 32-yard field goal attempt sailed wide left.

During the second half Rob Gronkowski suffered an ankle injury on a tackle by Bernard Pollard of the Ravens. Pollard injured Brady in his 2008 season in Kansas City, and also had injured Wes Welker during week 17 of the 2009 season with the Houston Texans. Later in an interview with KILT radio in Houston, Pollard said he was "fine and dandy" with being called a "Patriots killer."

The win was Brady's fifth in six AFC Championship Games and the first Patriots playoff win decided on a missed FGA since the club's 2006 Divisional playoff win against San Diego.

Serving as Patriots co-captains for the opening coin toss were Drew Bledsoe, Tedy Bruschi, Troy Brown, and Ty Law, veterans of the franchise's 1996 Super Bowl season.

=== Super Bowl XLVI vs. New York Giants ===
Quarter	1	2	3	4	Total
Giants	9	0	6	6	21
Patriots	0	10	7	0	17

at Lucas Oil Stadium, Indianapolis, Indiana

- Game time: 6:25 p.m. EST
- Referee: John Parry
- TV announcers (NBC): Al Michaels (play-by-play), Cris Collinsworth (color commentator), Michele Tafoya (sideline reporter)

Game information
First quarter
- NYG – Intentional Grounding penalty on Tom Brady in end zone for a safety, 8:52. NYG 2–0.
- NYG – Victor Cruz 2-yard pass from Eli Manning (Lawrence Tynes kick), 3:24. NYG 9–0. Drive: 9 plays, 78 yards, 5:23

Second quarter

- NE – Stephen Gostkowski 29-yard field goal, 13:48. NYG 9–3. Drive: 10 plays, 60 yards, 4:32
- NE – Danny Woodhead 4-yard pass from Tom Brady (Stephen Gostkowski kick), 0:08. NE 10–9. Drive: 14 plays, 96 yards, 3:55

Third quarter

- NE – Aaron Hernandez 12-yard pass from Tom Brady (Stephen Gostkowski kick), 11:20. NE 17–9. Drive: 8 plays, 79 yards, 3:40
- NYG – Lawrence Tynes 38-yard field goal, 6:43. NE 17–12. Drive: 7 plays, 45 yards, 4:37
- NYG – Lawrence Tynes 33-yard field goal, 0:35. NE 17–15. Drive: 8 plays, 36 yards, 5:01

Fourth quarter

- NYG – Ahmad Bradshaw 6-yard run (run failed), 0:57. NYG 21–17. Drive: 9 plays, 88 yards, 2:49

== Awards and honors ==
Recipient	Award(s)
Tom Brady	Week 1: AFC Offensive Player of the Week; Week 1: FedEx Express NFL Player of the Week; Week 2: AFC Offensive Player of the Week; November: AFC Offensive Player of the Month; Week 16: AFC Offensive Player of the Week; December/January: AFC Offensive Player of the Month
Marcus Cannon	Ed Block Courage Award
Andre Carter	Week 10: AFC Defensive Player of the Week
Julian Edelman	Week 11: AFC Special Teams Player of the Week
Rob Gronkowski	Week 13: NFL.com Hardest Working Man; Week 14: NFL.com Hardest Working Man; Week 14: AFC Offensive Player of the Week
Sterling Moore	Week 17: Pepsi Rookie of the Week
Team	Week 6: GMC Never Say Never Moment of the Week (game-winning drive)

=== Pro Bowl and All-Pro selections ===
Eight Patriots were named to the initial 2012 Pro Bowl team, all but one as starters (the NFL does not officially count special teams players as starters). Brady, Welker, and Gronkowski were all in the top ten overall in fan voting, and were the top three vote-getters in the AFC.

Position	Player	Selection	Fan votes (AFC positional rank)
Quarterback	Tom Brady	7th	1,454,311 (1st)
Wide receiver	Wes Welker	4th	1,133,787 (1st)
Tight end	Rob Gronkowski	1st	936,886 (1st)
Offensive guard	Logan Mankins	4th	272,702 (1st)
Offensive guard	Brian Waters	6th	200,270 (4th)
Defensive end	Andre Carter	1st	511,693 (1st)
Defensive tackle	Vince Wilfork	4th	290,463 (3rd)
Special teams	Matthew Slater	1st	75,922 (3rd)

Four of the Patriots' eight Pro Bowlers were named to the AP's 2011 All-Pro Team: Gronkowski and Welker were named to the first team, while Mankins and Wilfork were named to the second team.
