= Non-football injury and illness =

NFL roster designations

Non-football injury and non-football illness (NFI) are roster designations used in the National Football League (NFL) for players who are unable to practice as a result of conditions unrelated to football, or injuries that did not occur during NFL games or practices. They are similar to the physically unable to perform and injured reserve lists.

Players on the reserve/non-football injury or reserve/non-football illness lists are ineligible to practice or play in games for the first six weeks of the regular season. After six weeks, a player can begin practicing with their team but cannot be moved to the active roster until after the team has played its first eight games of the season. When a player starts practicing, a three-week window begins in which the player can be moved to the active roster. If a player does not get activated after the three-week window ends, they must remain on the reserve/NFI list for the rest of the season. Only up to two players from the NFI lists are eligible to return to the active roster for each NFL team. NFL teams are not required to pay base salaries to players placed on the reserve/non-football injury or reserve/non-football illness lists.

== Active/NFI ==
Players who report to training camp injured or ill due to injuries or illnesses sustained outside of NFL practices or games can be placed on the active/non-football injury or active/non-football illness lists while they recover. A player cannot remain on an NFI list if they participate in a practice or game during the preseason. Players on these lists still count towards the 90-man roster limits prior to the start of the regular season. If a player on the active/NFI list is still injured or ill by the final roster cutdown date, they can be placed on the reserve/non-football injury or reserve/non-football illness lists and not count towards the 53-man roster limit.

== Notable examples ==
Willis McGahee spent his entire rookie season on the Buffalo Bills' non-football injury list due to the major knee injury he sustained in the 2003 Fiesta Bowl while in college. Former New England Patriots offensive tackle Marcus Cannon began his rookie season on the non-football illness list as he recovered from chemotherapy for non-Hodgkin lymphoma in 2011.

== See also ==
- Injured reserve list
- Physically unable to perform
