= 2011 All-Pro Team =

Official list of the best NFL players in 2011

The 2011 All-Pro teams were named by the Associated Press (AP), Pro Football Writers of America (PFWA), and The Sporting News (TSN) for performance in the 2011 NFL season. While none of these have the official imprimatur of the NFL (whose official recognition is nomination to the 2012 Pro Bowl), they are included (separately) in the NFL Record and Fact Book. Any player selected to any of the teams can be described as an "All-Pro."

The AP team, with first- and second-team selections, was chosen by a national panel of 50 NFL writers; the Sporting News selection process uses a panel of 50 NFL coaches and executives, while the PFWA team is chosen by polling its 300+ members.

== Teams ==
Offense
Position	First team	Second team
Quarterback	Aaron Rodgers, Green Bay Packers (AP, PFWA, SN)	Drew Brees, New Orleans Saints (AP-2)
Running back	Maurice Jones-Drew, Jacksonville Jaguars (AP, PFWA, SN); LeSean McCoy, Philadelphia Eagles (AP, PFWA, SN)	Arian Foster, Houston Texans (AP-2); Ray Rice, Baltimore Ravens (AP-2)
Fullback	Vonta Leach, Baltimore Ravens (AP)	John Kuhn, Green Bay Packers (AP-2)
Wide receiver	Wes Welker, New England Patriots (AP, PFWA, SN); Calvin Johnson, Detroit Lions (AP, PFWA, SN)	Larry Fitzgerald, Arizona Cardinals (AP-2); Victor Cruz, New York Giants (AP-2)
Tight end	Rob Gronkowski, New England Patriots (AP, PFWA, SN)	Jimmy Graham, New Orleans Saints (AP-2)
Tackle	Joe Thomas, Cleveland Browns (AP, PFWA); Jason Peters, Philadelphia Eagles (AP, PFWA, SN); Michael Roos, Tennessee Titans (SN)	Duane Brown, Houston Texans (AP-2); Joe Staley, San Francisco 49ers (AP-2)
Guard	Carl Nicks, New Orleans Saints (AP, PFWA, SN); Jahri Evans, New Orleans Saints (AP, PFWA, SN)	Marshal Yanda, Baltimore Ravens (AP-2); Logan Mankins, New England Patriots (AP-2)
Center	Maurkice Pouncey, Pittsburgh Steelers (AP, PFWA); Nick Mangold, New York Jets (SN)	Ryan Kalil, Carolina Panthers (AP-2t); Nick Mangold, New York Jets (AP-2t)

Special teams
Position	First team	Second team
Kicker	David Akers, San Francisco 49ers (AP, PFWA); Sebastian Janikowski Oakland Raiders (SN)	Sebastian Janikowski, Oakland Raiders (AP-2)
Punter	Andy Lee, San Francisco 49ers (AP, PFWA, SN)	Shane Lechler, Oakland Raiders (AP-2)
Kick returner	Patrick Peterson, Arizona Cardinals (AP); Joe McKnight, New York Jets (PFWA, SN)	Devin Hester, Chicago Bears (AP-2)
Punt returner	Patrick Peterson, Arizona Cardinals (PFWA, SN)	
Special teams	Matthew Slater, New England Patriots (PFWA)	

Defense
Position	First team	Second team
Defensive end	Jared Allen, Minnesota Vikings (AP, PFWA, SN); Jason Pierre-Paul, New York Giants (AP, PFWA); Jason Babin, Philadelphia Eagles (SN)	Jason Babin, Philadelphia Eagles (AP-2); Justin Smith, San Francisco 49ers (AP-2)
Defensive tackle	Justin Smith, San Francisco 49ers (AP, PFWA); Haloti Ngata, Baltimore Ravens (AP, PFWA, SN); Ndamukong Suh, Detroit Lions (SN)	Geno Atkins, Cincinnati Bengals (AP-2); Richard Seymour, Oakland Raiders (AP-2t); Vince Wilfork, New England Patriots (AP-2t)
Outside linebacker	DeMarcus Ware, Dallas Cowboys (AP, PFWA, SN); Terrell Suggs, Baltimore Ravens (AP, PFWA, SN)	Tamba Hali, Kansas City Chiefs (AP-2); Von Miller, Denver Broncos (AP-2)
Inside linebacker	Patrick Willis, San Francisco 49ers (AP, PFWA, SN); NaVorro Bowman, San Francisco 49ers (AP-t); Derrick Johnson, Kansas City Chiefs (AP-t)	Brian Cushing, Houston Texans (AP-2); London Fletcher, Washington Redskins (AP-2)
Cornerback	Charles Woodson, Green Bay Packers (AP, PFWA); Darrelle Revis, New York Jets (AP, SN); Johnathan Joseph, Houston Texans (PFWA)	Johnathan Joseph, Houston Texans (AP-2); Carlos Rogers, San Francisco 49ers (AP-2)
Safety	Troy Polamalu, Pittsburgh Steelers (AP, PFWA, SN); Eric Weddle, San Diego Chargers (AP, PFWA, SN)	Earl Thomas, Seattle Seahawks (AP-2); Ed Reed, Baltimore Ravens (AP-2)

== Key ==
- AP = Associated Press first-team All-Pro
- AP-t = Tied for first-team All-Pro in the AP vote
- AP-2 = Associated Press second-team All-Pro
- AP-2t = Tied for second-team All-Pro in the AP vote
- PFWA = Pro Football Writers Association All-NFL
- SN = Sporting News All-Pro
