= Andre Carter =

American football player and coach (born 1979)

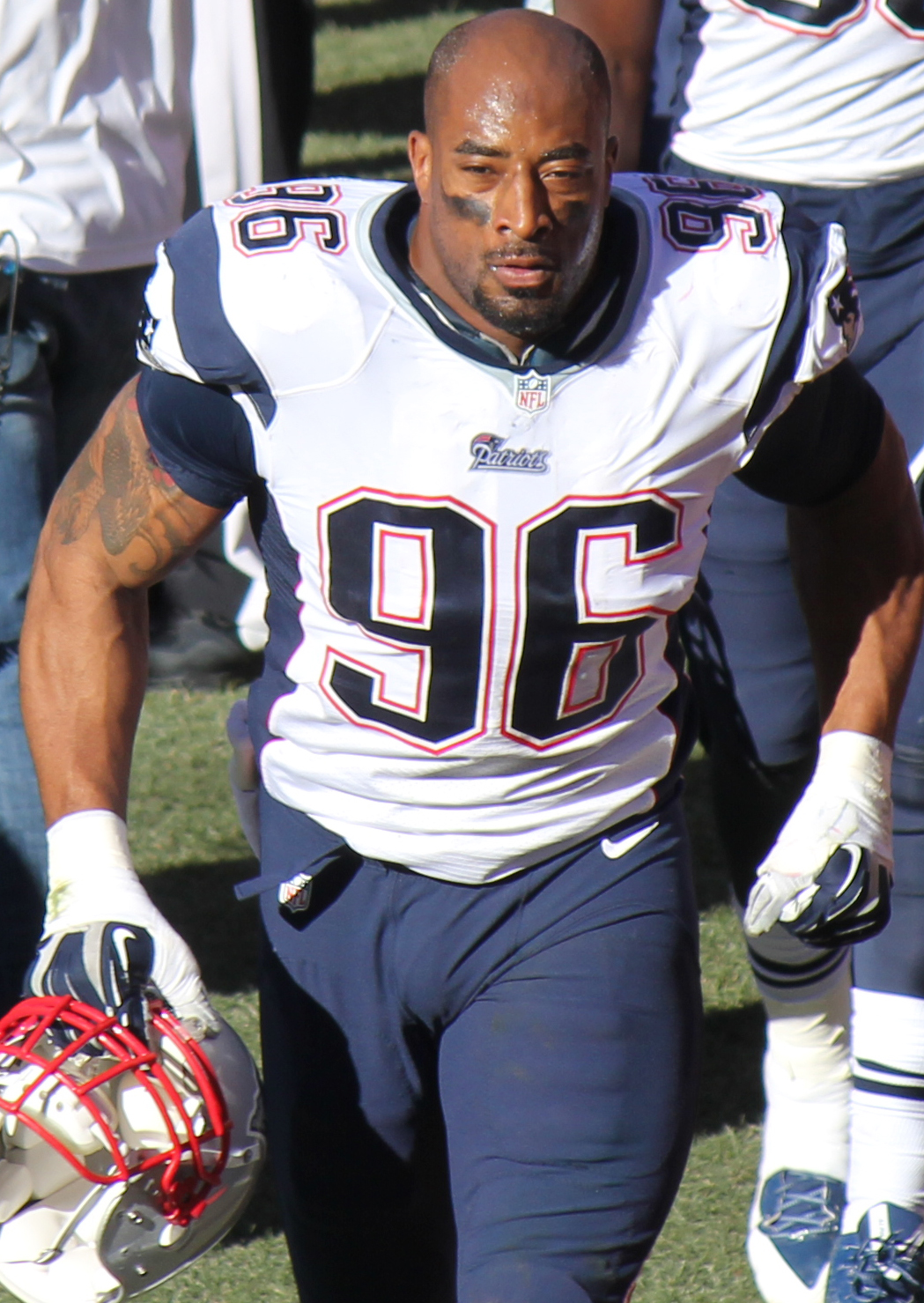
- Carter with the New England Patriots in 2013

Personal information
- Born: May 12, 1979 (age 47); Denver, Colorado, U.S.
- Listed height: 6 ft 4 in (1.93 m)
- Listed weight: 260 lb (118 kg)

Career information
- High school: Oak Grove (San Jose, California)
- College: California (1997–2000)
- NFL draft: 2001: 1st round, 7th overall pick

Career history

Playing
- San Francisco 49ers (2001–2005); Washington Redskins (2006–2010); New England Patriots (2011); Oakland Raiders (2012); New England Patriots (2013)

Coaching
- California (2015) Graduate assistant; San Francisco 49ers (2016) Bill Walsh NFL diversity coaching fellowship; Miami Dolphins (2017–2018) Assistant defensive line coach; New York Jets (2019–2020) Defensive line coach; LSU (2021) Defensive line coach; Las Vegas Raiders (2024) Pass rush specialist

Awards and highlights
- Pro Bowl (2011); Unanimous All-American (2000); Morris Trophy (2000); 2× First-team All-Pac-10 (1999, 2000); Second-team All-Pac-10 (1998)

Career NFL statistics
- Total tackles: 517
- Sacks: 80.5
- Forced fumbles: 18
- Fumble recoveries: 4
- Pass deflections: 28
- Stats at Pro Football Reference

Rubin Andre Carter (born May 12, 1979) is an American football coach and former player in the National Football League (NFL) A defensive end, he played college football for the California Golden Bears, and was a unanimous All-American. The San Francisco 49ers selected him with the seventh overall pick in the 2001 NFL draft, and he also played for the Washington Redskins, New England Patriots, and Oakland Raiders. Carter currently is retired.

== Early life ==
Carter was born in Denver, Colorado. He attended Oak Grove High School in San Jose, California. As a senior, he was a USA Today All-America high school selection, and the Gatorade California Player of the Year. He was also rated as the top defensive lineman and a high school All-America selection by Parade magazine.

== College career ==
Carter attended the University of California, Berkeley, and played for the California Golden Bears from 1997 to 2000. During his junior and senior years he was a first-team All-Pac-10 selection. As a senior in 2000, he won the Morris Trophy, awarded to the Pac-10's top defensive lineman, and was recognized as a unanimous All-American. In addition to being selected as the Golden Bears' most valuable player, Carter was also a finalist for the Bronko Nagurski Trophy, given to the nation's top defensive player.

== Professional career ==
Pre-draft measurables
Height	Weight	Arm length	Hand span	40-yard dash	20-yard shuttle	Vertical jump	Broad jump	Bench press
6 ft 4 3/8 in (1.94 m)	249 lb (113 kg)	35 1/2 in (0.90 m)	9 1/2 in (0.24 m)	4.84 s	4.24 s	38.5 in (0.98 m)	11 ft 0 in (3.35 m)	20 reps
All values from the NFL Combine

=== San Francisco 49ers ===
Carter was selected by the San Francisco 49ers in the first round of the 2001 NFL draft. In the 2005 NFL season, because the 49ers implemented a 3-4 defense under Head Coach Mike Nolan, Carter was moved to outside linebacker. While playing for the 49ers, he made 154 solo tackles, 32 sacks, and 12 pass deflections in 69 games.

=== Washington Redskins ===
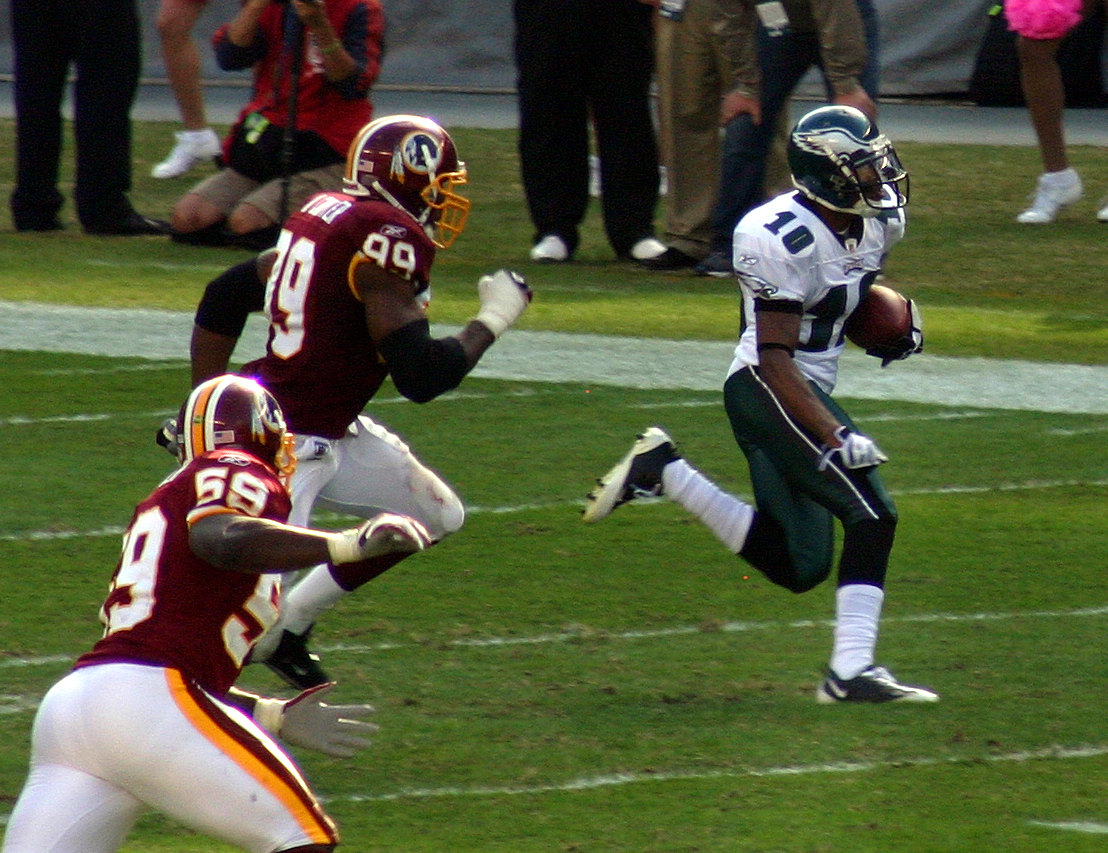
Carter (#99) giving chase to DeSean Jackson during a 2008 game versus the Philadelphia Eagles.

Carter signed a six-year, $30 million contract with the Washington Redskins as an unrestricted free agent on March 14, 2006. The Redskins moved Carter back to defensive end, his natural position. In his first year with the Redskins, he had 56 total tackles and six sacks. He showed much improvement in 2007, with 55 tackles, 10.5 sacks, and four forced fumbles. He also had a safety in a 34–3 win over the Detroit Lions. Carter's best season as a Redskin came in 2009 when he totalled 11 sacks. However, in 2010 the Redskins hired a new coach, Mike Shanahan, who changed their 4-3 defense to a 3-4 defense which required Carter to play outside linebacker. Carter was never fully comfortable with the move. By mid-season, and at Carter's request, the coaching staff had him playing from a three-point stance on passing downs. The Redskins released Carter on March 1, 2011.

=== New England Patriots ===
Carter announced on his Twitter page on August 7, 2011, that he would be playing for the New England Patriots in the 2011 NFL season. This was later confirmed by Ian Rapoport of the Boston Herald and Michael Lombardi of the NFL Network. According to Rapoport, Carter signed a one-year deal with a base salary of $1.75m. He also received a $500k signing bonus and the chance to earn another $500k in incentives, making the contract worth up to $2.75 million. On November 13, 2011, Carter had a career game against the New York Jets, recording 4 sacks and tying the Patriots single game sack record. On Sunday, December 18, 2011, while playing against the Denver Broncos, Carter tore his left quadriceps tendon and missed the remainder of the 2011 regular season as well as the playoffs, as he underwent surgery. Despite being injured, Carter was one of eight Patriots honored by a selection to the 2012 Pro Bowl.

==== Patriots franchise record ====
- Most sacks in a single game: 4 (2011) (vs New York Jets) (tied)

=== Oakland Raiders ===
On September 26, 2012, the Oakland Raiders announced they had signed Carter. On April 9, 2013, Carter re-signed with the Raiders on a one-year deal. On August 31, 2013, he was released.

=== New England Patriots ===
Carter re-signed with the Patriots on October 22, 2013, to add a veteran presence to a Patriots defense that lost Vince Wilfork and Jerod Mayo to season-ending injuries earlier in the season.

=== Career statistics ===
Year	Team	GP	COMB	TOTAL	AST	SACK	FF	FR	FR YDS	INT	IR YDS	AVG IR	LNG	TD	PD
2001	SF	15	46	39	7	6.5	2	1	0	0	0	0	0	0	2
2002	SF	16	54	45	9	12.5	3	1	0	0	0	0	0	0	4
2003	SF	15	34	27	7	6.5	1	0	0	0	0	0	0	0	3
2004	SF	7	10	8	2	2.0	1	0	0	0	0	0	0	0	1
2005	SF	16	44	35	9	4.5	0	0	0	0	0	0	0	0	2
2006	WSH	16	56	47	9	6.0	0	0	0	0	0	0	0	0	2
2007	WSH	16	55	43	12	10.5	4	1	0	0	0	0	0	0	2
2008	WSH	16	37	23	14	4.0	0	0	0	0	0	0	0	0	1
2009	WSH	16	62	48	14	11.0	3	0	0	0	0	0	0	0	4
2010	WSH	16	44	25	19	2.5	1	1	0	0	0	0	0	0	1
2011	NE	14	52	31	21	10.0	2	0	0	0	0	0	0	0	1
2012	OAK	12	19	13	6	2.5	1	0	0	0	0	0	0	0	0
2013	NE	9	4	3	1	2.0	0	0	0	0	0	0	0	0	2
Total	Total	184	517	387	130	80.5	18	4	0	0	0	0	0	0	25

== Coaching career ==
In August 2015, Carter returned to California as an undergraduate assistant. On February 10, 2017, Carter was hired by the Miami Dolphins as an assistant defensive line coach. When Adam Gase was fired by Miami and subsequently hired by the New York Jets, Carter moved with Gase to New York and became the Jets' defensive line coach.

In 2021 Carter became the defensive line coach at Louisiana State University (LSU).

On February 2, 2024, Carter was hired as a pass rush specialist under new Raiders head coach Antonio Pierce and general manager Tom Telesco.

== Personal life ==
Carter is the son of former Denver Broncos defensive tackle Rubin Carter. He has a wife, Bethany, and two children: stepdaughter, Aysha, born in 1993, and a son, Quincy, born in 2007. His middle name was given to him by his father who named him after his close friend and teammate Andre Townsend.
