= Patrick Peterson =

American football player (born 1990)

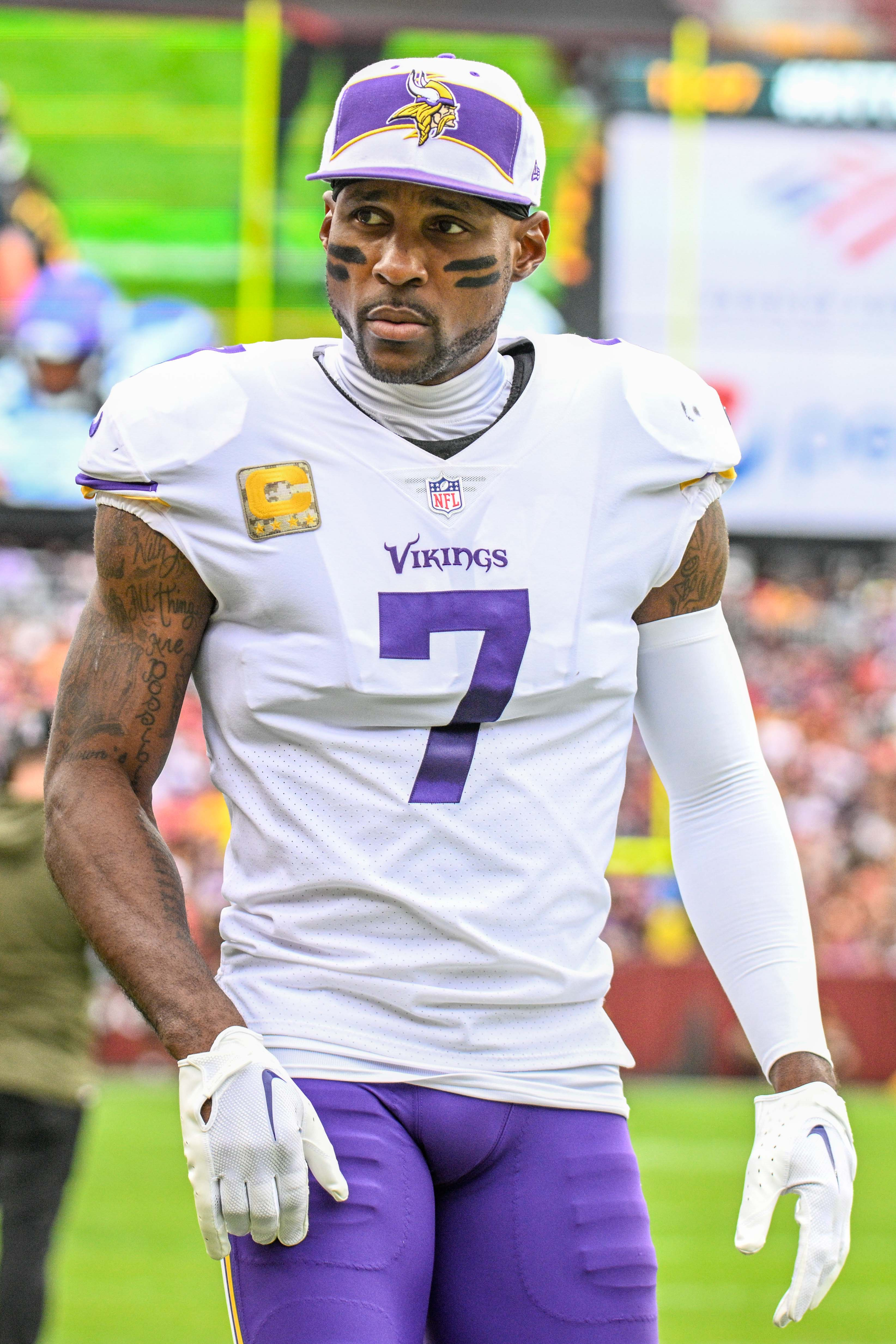
- Peterson with the Minnesota Vikings in 2022

No. 21, 7, 20
- Position: Cornerback

Personal information
- Born: July 11, 1990 (age 36); Pompano Beach, Florida, U.S.
- Listed height: 6 ft 1 in (1.85 m)
- Listed weight: 203 lb (92 kg)

Career information
- High school: Blanche Ely (Pompano Beach)
- College: LSU (2008–2010)
- NFL draft: 2011: 1st round, 5th overall pick

Career history
- Arizona Cardinals (2011–2020); Minnesota Vikings (2021–2022); Pittsburgh Steelers (2023)

Awards and highlights
- 3× First-team All-Pro (2011, 2013, 2015); 8× Pro Bowl (2011–2018); NFL 2010s All-Decade Team; NFL punt return yards leader (2011); PFWA All-Rookie Team (2011); SEC Special Teams Player of the Year (2010); Chuck Bednarik Award (2010); Jim Thorpe Award (2010); Jack Tatum Trophy (2010); Unanimous All-American (2010); Second-team All-American (2009); First-team All-SEC (2010) (Note: Selected as both cornerback and return specialist); Second-team All-SEC (2009)

Career NFL statistics
- Tackles: 652
- Interceptions: 36
- Interception yards: 408
- Pass deflections: 122
- Forced fumbles: 2
- Fumble recoveries: 12
- Return yards: 1,891
- Total touchdowns: 6
- Stats at Pro Football Reference

Patrick De'mon Peterson Jr. (né Johnson; born July 11, 1990) is an American former professional football player who was a cornerback for 13 seasons in the National Football League (NFL). He played college football for the LSU Tigers, where he won the Chuck Bednarik Award as the best defensive player in the country, and the Jim Thorpe Award as the best defensive back. He is regarded as one of the greatest cornerbacks of his era.

Peterson was selected fifth overall by the Arizona Cardinals in the first round of the 2011 NFL draft. A member of the NFL 2010s All-Decade Team, Peterson was selected to the Pro Bowl in each of his first eight seasons in the NFL and was named to the All-Pro first-team on three occasions. In 2021, he signed with the Minnesota Vikings as a free agent after 10 seasons with Arizona. After two seasons with Minnesota, he spent his final season with the Pittsburgh Steelers.

== Early life ==
Peterson was born in Pompano Beach, Florida on July 11, 1990. He attended Blanche Ely High School, where he played running back and defensive back. As a junior, he recorded 11 total touchdowns on offense, while recording seven interceptions and 54 tackles on defense. He returned three kick-offs for touchdowns and added 10 rushes for 213 yards. As a senior, Peterson compiled 733 yards rushing and 11 touchdowns (9 rushings, one kick return, and one punt return). Defensively, he had 21 tackles and five interceptions. Besides numerous All-American team selections, Peterson was named Defensive Player of the Year by USA Today and played in the 2008 U.S. Army All-American Bowl.

He was also on the school's track & field team, where he ran the 100 meters in 10.92 seconds and the 200 meters in 22.24 seconds. He was also a member of the 4 × 100 m relay (41.41 s) squad.

A consensus five-star prospect by all major recruiting services, Peterson was rated as the nation's fifth-best overall player by Rivals.com and No. 8 by ESPN. Before his senior season, he verbally committed to play for the University of Miami, but continued to look at other schools. By November 2007, Peterson had reopened his recruiting process and acknowledged interest in Georgia, USC, Florida, and LSU. He later dropped Georgia and USC from his list and added Florida State, but eventually announced his decision to attend LSU at the U.S. Army All-American Bowl.

== College career ==
Peterson attended Louisiana State University, where he played for coach Les Miles's LSU Tigers football team from 2008 to 2010.

=== Freshman year ===
One of the most decorated high school players to ever attend LSU, Peterson played 13 games as a true freshman. On November 8, against SEC West rival Alabama, he had his first collegiate interception. He started the final four games of season, including the Chick-fil-A Bowl win over Georgia Tech. Peterson finished the season with 41 tackles, one interception, and three pass breakups, while also adding a forced fumble and a quarterback hurry.

=== Sophomore year ===
In his sophomore season, Peterson emerged as one of the top defensive backs in the Southeastern Conference (SEC). On September 26, against Mississippi State, he had a 37-yard interception return for a touchdown. In a game against standout wide receiver A. J. Green of Georgia, Peterson was able to hold Green to just four catches.

By mid-season, Peterson tied for fourth in the league with seven passes defended, and was named the SEC's "Most Improved Player" by ESPN's Chris Low.

Another highly anticipated match-up occurred when Peterson went against Julio Jones of Alabama. Peterson's LSU Tigers were ranked ninth in the country and traveled to face Nick Saban and the #1 ranked Crimson Tide. The Tigers were down by six points late in the fourth quarter when Peterson stepped in front of a pass from quarterback Greg McElroy to Julio Jones for what seemed like an interception. Multiple CBS camera angles showed that Peterson was able to get at least one foot in bounds. However, even after review, the SEC officiating crew called the pass incomplete, saying that Peterson was not able to get any foot in bounds. Alabama would go on to kick a field goal on that drive and won 24–15. The missed interception call quickly became infamous and was debated by many media outlets.

Peterson finished 2009 with 52 tackles. His 43 solo tackles were second on the team behind linebacker Kelvin Sheppard. Peterson returned an interception for a touchdown against Mississippi State, and he returned a blocked field goal against Ole Miss for a touchdown. He was also named a 2009 Second-Team All-American by The Sporting News, a 2009 First-Team All-SEC performer by ESPN, and a 2009 Second-Team All-SEC performer by the AP.

=== Junior year ===
Peterson was named to the preseason watch lists for the Nagurski Award, the Thorpe Award, the Ronnie Lott Award, the Walter Camp Award, and the Chuck Bednarik Award. It was announced during the summer of 2010 that Peterson would begin returning punts and kickoffs due to his size, speed, and athleticism. With this added dimension to his game and his dominance as a cornerback, Peterson began being mentioned as a dark horse for the 2010 Heisman Trophy award, presented to the best college football player every year.

Peterson began his junior season against North Carolina in the 2010 Chick-fil-A Kickoff Game. The Tigers won 30–24 and Peterson was terrific. In his debut as a returner, Peterson had a school-record 257 yards returning punts and kickoffs, 244 yards coming in the first half. He returned a punt 87 yards for a touchdown and consistently gave the Tigers' offense good field position. His 257-yard performance ranks second all-time in the SEC behind Mississippi State's Nick Turner and his 266-yard performance. Peterson was named Special Teams Player of the Week for his performance. He was also named the Lott IMPACT Player of the Week.

Peterson had two punt returns against Vanderbilt for eight yards in week two as the Tigers rolled past the Commodores. He also returned two kickoffs for 51 yards, to go along with one tackle.

In week three of the 2010 season, the 2–0 Tigers hosted 1–1 Mississippi State for LSU's first home game of the year. The Tiger defense suffocated Mississippi State's offense and Peterson strengthened his campaign with two acrobatic interceptions for LSU. He also returned one kickoff 39 yards and one punt 2 yards to go along with four solo tackles.

Peterson entertained the home crowd again in week four against Top-25 foe West Virginia. With the game tied 0–0 early in the first quarter, West Virginia went to attempt a mid-range field goal, and Peterson was able to leap from behind the line of scrimmage and block the kick. The Tiger defense forced West Virginia to punt later in the half. Peterson fielded the punt on his own 40-yard line and raced 60 yards up the middle of the field for a touchdown and a 17–0 LSU lead. Peterson struck the Heisman pose in the north end zone of Tiger Stadium, drawing a 15-yard unsportsmanlike conduct penalty. Peterson was almost single-handedly responsible for 10 points in the game that ended with LSU winning 20–14. The national sports media began comparing Peterson to Woodson, who actually had worse statistics than Peterson through his first four games during his Heisman winning season. Peterson was again named SEC Special Teams Player of the Week. He also recorded 1 solo tackle.

Week five saw the LSU Tigers take on the Tennessee Volunteers. Peterson and the LSU defense limited Tennessee to 217 yards of offense and the Tigers won 16–14. Peterson recorded 1 solo tackle and 3 assisted tackles. He had 3 punt returns for 30 yards and 3 kickoff returns for 64 yards. The LSU Tigers improved to 5–0 and 3–0 in the SEC with the victory over the Volunteers.

Peterson's efforts helped the Tigers to a No. 12 ranking in the Associated Press Top 25 as well as a #9 ranking in the USA Today Coaches Poll Top 25. Through week 5 of the 2010 season, he was 3rd in Division I-A in punt return average at 23.6 yards per attempt (12 for 283), 1st in punt return touchdowns with 2, and 22nd in kickoff return average at 28.2 yards per attempt. Peterson was also tied for 30th in the country with two interceptions. He was in the top five of most straw polls regarding the 2010 Heisman Trophy. In an effort to jumpstart the struggling offense for the Tigers, Peterson practiced as a wide receiver and a running back on offense.

On October 9, against the Florida Gators, Peterson had four kick returns for 106 net yards, one punt return, and one total tackle in the 33–29 victory. In the next game, against the McNeese State Cowboys, he had two kick returns for 63 net yards and two punt returns for 34 net yards, to go along with one tackle. In the following game, against Auburn, he had four kick returns for 99 net yards, two punt returns for 18 net yards, and three total tackles. On November 6, against Alabama, he had two kick returns for 45 net yards, two punt returns for 22 net yards, eight total tackles, and three passes defended in the 24–21 victory. The next week, against Louisiana–Monroe, he had three punt returns for 31 net yards, one total tackle, and an interception that was returned 85 yards. In the following game, against Ole Miss, he had four kick returns for 121 net yards, three punt returns for 30 net yards, four total tackles, and one interception. On November 27, against Arkansas, he had four kick returns for 163 net yards, three total tackles, and one pass defensed. In his final collegiate game, the Cotton Bowl against Texas A&M, he had three kick returns for 81 net yards to go along with six total tackles.

Following the season, he was a first-team All-SEC selection and was recognized as a unanimous first-team All-American. His 934 kickoff return yards and 29.1 yards per return average both ranked second in the SEC, while his 418 punt return yards and 16.1 yards per return average each ranked first.

== Professional career ==
=== Pre-draft ===
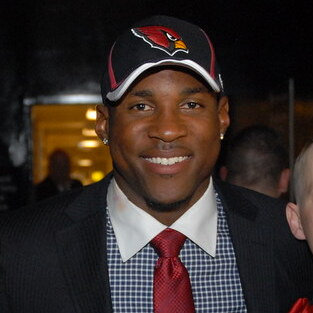
Peterson at the 2011 NFL draft

Coming out of LSU in 2011, Peterson was a projected first-round pick by NFL draft experts and scouts. He was a consensus top-five pick and was thought to be the best player in the draft by multiple analysts. Peterson attended the NFL Combine and completed all of the required combine drills. On March 14, 2011, he participated at LSU's pro day and opted to stand on his combine numbers and only perform positional drills for scouts and team representatives. Pittsburgh Steelers head coach Mike Tomlin, Carolina Panthers head coach Ron Rivera, and New Orleans Saints head coach Sean Payton were among the team representatives that attended LSU's pro day to scout Peterson, Kelvin Sheppard, Drake Nevis, Joseph Barksdale, Stevan Ridley, Lazarius Levingston, Terrence Toliver, and multiple others. He was ranked the top cornerback prospect in the draft by NFL analyst Mike Mayock, NFLDraftScout.com, Foxsports analyst Brian Billick, and Sports Illustrated.

Pre-draft measurables
Height	Weight	Arm length	Hand span	Wingspan	40-yard dash	10-yard split	20-yard split	20-yard shuttle	Three-cone drill	Vertical jump	Broad jump	Bench press
6 ft 0 1/4 in (1.84 m)	219 lb (99 kg)	32 in (0.81 m)	9 1/4 in (0.23 m)	6 ft 6 in (1.98 m)	4.34 s	1.57 s	2.58 s	4.07 s	6.58 s	38 in (0.97 m)	10 ft 6 in (3.20 m)	15 reps
All values from NFL Combine

=== Arizona Cardinals ===
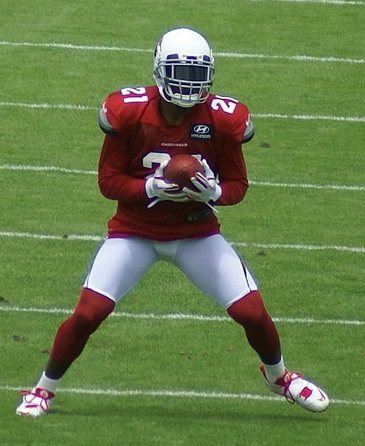
Peterson with the Cardinals in 2012

==== 2011 ====
The Arizona Cardinals selected Peterson in the first round (fifth overall) of the 2011 NFL draft. He was the first cornerback selected. On July 30, 2011, the Cardinals signed Peterson to a fully guaranteed four-year, $18.42 million contract that included a signing bonus of $11.90 million.

Head coach Ken Whisenhunt named Peterson the starting cornerback, alongside Greg Toler, to begin his rookie season. He started the Cardinals' season-opener against the Panthers and scored his first career touchdown after returning a punt for an 89-yards in the fourth quarter to win the game 28–21. Peterson also recorded five solo tackles during the game. The following week, he recorded a season-high eight combined tackles as the Cardinals lost 22–21 to the Washington Redskins. On September 25, 2011, Peterson made one tackle, defended a pass, and made his first career interception, picking off a pass from Seattle Seahawks quarterback Tarvaris Jackson during a 13–10 loss.

On November 6, 2011, during the overtime period, Peterson fielded a punt at the one-yard line, evaded several would-be tacklers, and returned it for the 99-yard touchdown in a 19–13 victory over the St. Louis Rams. He also intercepted a flea-flicker pass from Sam Bradford intended for Brandon Lloyd and recorded three tackles and three pass deflections. He earned his first NFC Special Teams Player of the Week nomination. In Week 14, he led the Cardinals with five solo tackles and made the first sack of his career on San Francisco 49ers quarterback Alex Smith during 21–19 victory for the Cardinals.

He tied the single-season record for punt return touchdowns with his fourth, accomplishing the feat against the Rams on November 27. He became the only player in NFL history with four punt-return touchdowns of at least 80 yards in a single season. He earned NFC Special Teams Player of the Week for the second time for his performance against the Rams. He finished his rookie season with a sack, 64 combined tackles (59 solo), two interceptions, 13 passes defended, and two fumble recoveries in 16 games, all of which he started. He also produced a rookie record 699 return yards (the second highest total in NFL history) for four touchdowns on 44 punt returns.

Peterson was selected as a kick returner to the 2012 Pro Bowl and was the only rookie to be selected to the 2011 All-Pro First Team. He was ranked #55 by his fellow players on the NFL Top 100 Players of 2012.

==== 2012 ====
Peterson returned as the starting cornerback, opposite William Gay, to begin the 2012 season. On September 16, 2012, Peterson had one carry for 17 yards, three combined tackles, a pass deflection, and intercepted Tom Brady in a 20–18 victory over the New England Patriots. On December 16, 2012, he recorded a season-high seven combined tackles and intercepted Detroit Lions quarterback Matt Stafford in a 38–10 victory.

Peterson started all 16 games making 55 tackles with seven interceptions, 17 passes defended, and an NFL-leading five fumble recoveries. He also had 51 punt returns producing 426 return yards, three receptions for 11 receiving yards, and two carries for 13 rushing yards. On December 26, 2012, it was announced that Peterson was voted to the 2013 Pro Bowl as a cornerback. He was ranked #33 by his fellow players on the NFL Top 100 Players of 2013.

==== 2013 ====
The Cardinals' new head coach Bruce Arians named Peterson the starting cornerback, opposite Jerraud Powers, to begin the 2013 season.

On September 15, 2013, Peterson caught one pass for 17 yards, threw a 17-yard pass to Kerry Taylor, and recorded four solo tackles during a 25–21 win against the Lions. This made him the first defender to catch and complete a pass in the same game since the 1970 merger. On September 29, he recorded two solo tackles and intercepted two passes from Tampa Bay Buccaneers quarterback Mike Glennon during a 13–10 victory. It was the first game of Peterson's career with multiple interceptions. He earned NFC Defensive Player of the Week honors for his game against Tampa Bay. In Week 14, Peterson collected a season-high seven combined tackles in a 37–34 victory over the Tennessee Titans. Although the Cardinals finished with a 10–6 record in their first year under Bruce Arians, they finished third in their division and did not qualify for a playoff berth.

Peterson started all 16 games in 2013 and made 42 combined tackles (40 solo), three interceptions, 13 pass deflections, and two fumble recoveries. He also returned 33 punts for 198 return yards, had one kickoff return attempt for 18 yards, made six catches for 54 receiving yards, and had four carries for 21 yards. He was selected for the 2014 Pro Bowl as a cornerback, marking the third of his career. He was named a First Team All-Pro for the second time in his career. He was ranked #22 by his fellow players on the NFL Top 100 Players of 2014.

==== 2014 ====
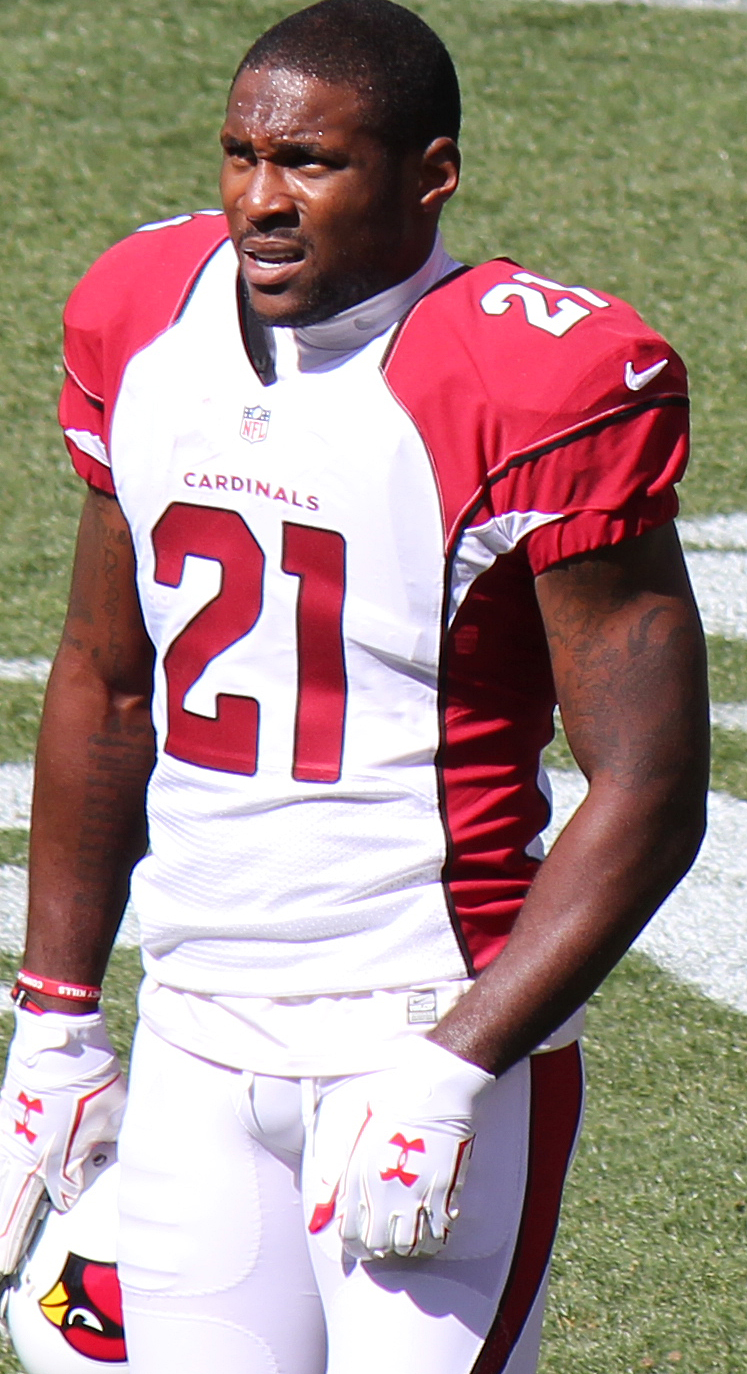
Peterson with the Cardinals in 2014

On July 29, 2014, the Cardinals signed Peterson to a five-year, $70 million contract extension with $48 million guaranteed and a $15.3 million signing bonus.

He began the season as the Cardinals' starting cornerback, opposite Antonio Cromartie, and no longer had to handle return duties due to the arrival of Ted Ginn Jr. On November 9, 2014, he made two solo tackles and intercepted two passes from Rams quarterback Austin Davis during a 31–14 victory. He returned one interception for a 30-yard touchdown, marking the first defensive touchdown of his career. He earned NFC Defensive Player of the Week for his performance against the Rams. On December 7, Peterson recorded a season-high eight combined tackles and sacked Kansas City Chiefs quarterback Alex Smith in a 17–14 victory. He finished the 2014 season with 50 combined tackles (43 solo), eight pass deflections, three interceptions, a forced fumble, and three fumble recoveries in 16 games and 16 starts. He was selected to the 2015 Pro Bowl as a cornerback, marking his fourth straight appearance.

The Cardinals finished with an 11–5 record in 2014 and qualified for a playoff berth. On January 3, 2015, Peterson played in his first career postseason game and recorded two combined tackles during a 16–27 loss to the Panthers in the NFC Wild Card Round.

Shortly after the 2014 NFL season, Peterson announced that he had been diagnosed with diabetes. He stated that this affected his performance in the 2014 season, that he had the disease under control, and was ready for the 2015 season. He was ranked #19 by his fellow players on the NFL Top 100 Players of 2015.

==== 2015 ====
Peterson was named the starting cornerback and had full-time punt return duties after the departure of Ted Ginn Jr.

On September 20, 2015, he recorded three solo tackles and intercepted Jay Cutler during a 48–23 win over the Chicago Bears. In Week 5, he collected four combined tackles and intercepted a pass off Matthew Stafford, as the Cardinals defeated the Lions 42–17. The following game, he earned a season-high five solo tackles as the Cardinals were defeated by the Steelers 13–25. Although he started all 16 games, Peterson finished with a career low 35 combined tackles (35 solo), eight pass deflections, and made two interceptions.

The Cardinals won the NFC West with a 13–3 record, receiving a playoff berth and a first round bye as the NFC's second seed. After defeating the Green Bay Packers 26–20 in the Divisional Round, in which Peterson had a 100-yard pick-six off Aaron Rodgers negated due to a defensive holding penalty, the Cardinals went on to the face the Panthers in the NFC Championship. Peterson recorded five combined tackles and returned an interception off Cam Newton for 70 yards, as the Cardinals lost 49–15.

He was selected to the 2016 Pro Bowl as a cornerback, marking his fifth straight, and was voted first-team All-Pro for the third time. He was also ranked 18th best player by his fellow NFL players on the NFL Top 100 Players of 2016.

==== 2016 ====
Peterson began the season as the starting cornerback, opposite Marcus Cooper, with full-time punt return duties being taken over by John Brown with Peterson returning sparingly throughout the season.

On September 18, 2016, Peterson recorded four combined tackles and intercepted Jameis Winston during a 40–7 victory over the Buccaneers. In Week 3, Peterson recorded four combined tackles and intercepted Tyrod Taylor, catching the ball with one hand during an 18–33 loss to the Buffalo Bills. On December 24, 2016, he collected a season-high six combined tackles in a 34–31 victory over the Seahawks. He recorded 51 combined tackles (45 solo), six passes deflected, and three interceptions in 16 games and 16 starts. On December 20, 2016, for the sixth consecutive year, Peterson was selected to be in the 2017 Pro Bowl, along with teammates Larry Fitzgerald and David Johnson. He was also ranked 19th by his peers on the NFL Top 100 Players of 2017 as the highest ranked cornerback.

==== 2017 ====
Peterson remained as the Cardinals' de facto starting cornerback with Justin Bethel after Marcus Cooper departed in free agency. In a Week 11 game against the Houston Texans, Peterson got his first interception of the season, a one handed grab off Tom Savage. On December 19, 2017, Peterson was named to his seventh straight Pro Bowl. Overall, he finished the 2017 season with 13 punt returns for 88 net yards, 34 total tackles, one fumble recovery, eight passes defensed, and one interception. He was ranked 23rd by his fellow players on the NFL Top 100 Players of 2018.

==== 2018 ====
In Week 1 against the Redskins, Peterson had one tackle and sacked Alex Smith once as the Cardinals lost 24–6. In Week 2 against the Los Angeles Rams, Peterson made eight tackles and intercepted Jared Goff as the Cardinals lost 34–0. In Week 7 against the Denver Broncos, Peterson made six tackles and intercepted Case Keenum as the Cardinals lost 45–10. He finished the season with 54 tackles, five pass deflections, and two interceptions, on his way to his eighth straight Pro Bowl. He was ranked 46th by his fellow players on the NFL Top 100 Players of 2019.

==== 2019 ====
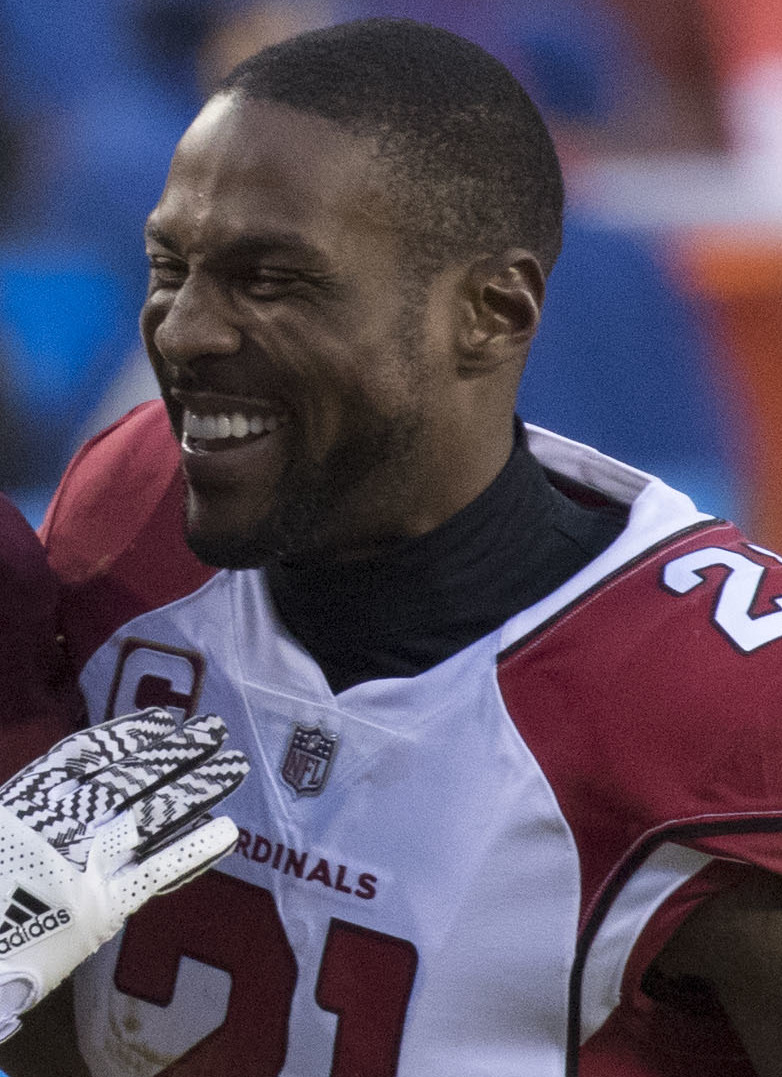
Peterson with the Cardinals in 2019

On May 16, 2019, the NFL announced that Peterson would be suspended for the first six games of the season for a violation of the league's performance-enhancing drugs policy. He filed an appeal to have the suspension reduced, but he did not win the appeal and the six-game suspension was upheld. This snapped his streak of 8 consecutive Pro Bowls, as per NFL rules, players who receive PED suspensions are ineligible for the Pro Bowl. He was reinstated from suspension on October 14, and was activated on October 19, 2019.

Peterson made his return from his suspension in week 7 against the New York Giants. In the game, Peterson recorded a strip-sack on Daniel Jones which was recovered by teammate Haason Reddick in the 27–21 win. In week 8 against the Saints, Peterson recorded his first interception of the season off a pass from Drew Brees in the 31–9 loss. In week 15 against the Cleveland Browns, Peterson recorded seven tackles, three passes defended, and intercepted a pass thrown by Baker Mayfield that was intended for Odell Beckham Jr. during the 38–24 win, earning him NFC Defensive Player of the Week. He started in all ten games he appeared in. He finished with one sack, 53 total tackles (46 solo), two interceptions, seven passes defended, and one forced fumble.

==== 2020 ====
In Week 4 against the Panthers, Peterson recorded his first interception of the season off a pass thrown by Teddy Bridgewater during the 31–21 loss. In Week 7 against the Seahawks, Peterson recorded an interception off a pass thrown by Russell Wilson during the 37–34 overtime win. In Week 10 against the Bills, Peterson recorded an interception off a pass thrown by Josh Allen in the 32–30 win. It would turn out to be Peterson's final interception in a Cardinals uniform. He finished the 2020 season with 61 total tackles (52 solo), three interceptions, and eight passes defended.

=== Minnesota Vikings ===
On March 17, 2021, the Minnesota Vikings signed Peterson to a fully guaranteed one-year, $8 million contract that includes a signing bonus of $5.90 million. On April 26, 2021, Peterson announced that he'd be changing his jersey number from 21 to 7. He wore 7 during high school and throughout his college career at LSU. With the change, he became the first player to take advantage of the NFL's new relaxed rules on jersey numbers.

Peterson entered the 2021 season as a starting cornerback for the Vikings. He started the first six games before suffering a hamstring injury in Week 7. He was placed on injured reserve on October 18, 2021. This is the first time in Peterson's 10-year career that he was forced to miss a game due to injury. He was activated on November 20, 2021. He made 13 appearances, all starts, in the 2021 season. He finished with 45 total tackles (34 solo), one interception returned for a touchdown, and five passes defensed.

On March 30, 2022, the Vikings re-signed Peterson to a one-year, $4 million contract that includes $3.50 million guaranteed and a signing bonus of $1.50 million.

On November 13, 2022, Peterson had two interceptions against Josh Allen and the Bills in a 33–30 overtime thriller, including an interception to end the game. He started in all 17 games and had 66 total tackles (56 solo), five interceptions, and 15 passes defended.

=== Pittsburgh Steelers ===
On March 16, 2023, the Steelers signed Peterson to a two-year, $14 million contract that includes a signing bonus of $5.85 million.

On Sunday Night Football in Week 3 of the 2023 season, Peterson recorded his 35th interception on a pass by Jimmy Garoppolo, surpassing Harrison Smith as the active player with the most interceptions.

In Week 16 against the Bengals, with all three members of the Steelers' three-safety package either injured or suspended, Peterson made his first career start as a safety. He appeared in all 17 games and started 16. He recorded 42 total tackles (34 solo), two interceptions, and 11 passes defended.

On March 8, 2024, Peterson was released by the Steelers.

=== Retirement ===
On April 11, 2025, after not playing in 2024, Peterson announced his retirement after 13 seasons, and officially retired as a Cardinal on April 14.

== Career statistics ==
=== NFL ===
Legend
	NFL record
	Led the league
**Bold**	Career high

Year	Team	Games		Tackles				Interceptions				Fumbles				Punt Return				
Year	Team	GP	GS	Cmb	Solo	Ast	Sck	PD	Int	Yds	TD	FF	FR	Yds	TD	Ret	Yds	Avg	Lng	TD
2011	ARI	16	16	64	**59**	5	**1.0**	13	2	1	0	0	2	−1	0	44	**699**	**15.9**	**99**	**4**
2012	ARI	16	16	55	52	3	0.0	**16**	**7**	64	0	0	**5**	**60**	0	**51**	426	8.4	26	0
2013	ARI	16	16	42	40	2	0.0	13	3	59	0	0	2	0	0	33	198	6.0	22	0
2014	ARI	16	16	50	43	7	**1.0**	7	3	30	**1**	0	0	0	0	0	0	—	0	0
2015	ARI	16	16	35	35	0	0.0	8	2	41	0	**1**	0	0	0	32	260	8.1	38	0
2016	ARI	16	16	51	45	6	0.0	6	3	27	0	0	1	0	0	13	81	6.2	17	0
2017	ARI	16	16	34	30	4	0.0	8	1	22	0	0	1	47	0	13	88	6.8	19	0
2018	ARI	16	16	54	45	9	**1.0**	5	2	0	0	0	1	49	0	9	64	7.1	16	0
2019	ARI	10	10	53	46	7	**1.0**	7	2	0	0	**1**	0	0	0	0	0	—	0	0
2020	ARI	16	16	61	52	9	0.0	8	3	7	0	0	0	0	0	0	0	—	0	0
2021	MIN	13	13	45	34	**11**	0.0	5	1	66	**1**	0	0	0	0	0	0	—	0	0
2022	MIN	**17**	**17**	**66**	56	10	0.0	15	5	**91**	0	0	0	0	0	0	0	—	0	0
2023	PIT	**17**	16	42	34	8	0.0	11	2	0	0	0	0	0	0	0	0	—	0	0
Career		201	200	652	571	81	4.0	122	36	408	2	2	12	155	0	195	1,816	9.3	99	4

=== College ===
Season	Team	GP	Tackles					Interceptions					Fumbles			
Season	Team	GP	Solo	Ast	Cmb	TfL	Sck	Int	Yds	Avg	TD	PD	FR	Yds	TD	FF
2008	LSU	13	32	9	41	1.5	0.0	1	0	0.0	0	0	0	0	0	0
2009	LSU	13	43	9	52	0.0	0.0	2	37	18.5	1	0	0	0	1	0
2010	LSU	13	29	13	42	1.5	0.0	4	134	33.5	0	0	0	0	0	0
Career		39	104	31	135	3.0	0.0	7	171	24.4	1	0	0	0	1	0

== Career highlights ==
=== Awards and honors ===
NFL

- 3× First-team All-Pro (2011, 2013, 2015)
- 8× Pro Bowl (2011–2018)
- NFL 2010s All-Decade Team
- NFL punt return yards leader (2011)
- PFWA All-Rookie Team (2011)
- 8× NFL Top 100 — 55th (2012), 33rd (2013), 22nd (2014), 19th (2015), 18th (2016), 19th (2017), 23rd (2018), 46th (2019)

College

- SEC Special Teams Player of the Year (2010)
- Chuck Bednarik Award (2010)
- Jim Thorpe Award (2010)
- Jack Tatum Trophy (2010)
- Unanimous All-American (2010)
- Second-team All-American (2009)
- First-team All-SEC (2010) (Note: Selected as both cornerback and return specialist)
- Second-team All-SEC (2009)

=== Records ===
==== NFL records ====
- Most punt return touchdowns in a single season: 4 (2011) (tied with Devin Hester, Jack Christiansen, Rick Upchurch)
- Longest overtime punt return touchdown: 99 yards

==== Cardinals franchise records ====
- Longest punt return touchdown: 99 (2011)
- Most punt return touchdowns in a single season: 4 (2011)
- Most punt return yards in a single season: 699 (2011)

== Personal life ==
Peterson was born Patrick Johnson, the name he held throughout his high school career & enrollment to LSU, before he changed his legal name to Patrick Peterson Jr. in August 2008. His parents are Patrick and Shandra Peterson of Fort Lauderdale, Florida. He is related to several fellow NFL players: he is maternal cousins of Bryant McFadden, Walter McFadden, Sinorice Moss and Santana Moss and a second cousin of Zack Moss. Peterson's younger brother, Avery, was a member of the ESPNU 150 Watch List in 2012. He also legally changed his surname from Johnson to Peterson.

Peterson lives in Scottsdale with his wife Antonique, an osteopathic physician. The couple have two daughters, Paityn and Parker.

Peterson revealed he had type two diabetes in 2015.
