= Kyle Hix =

American football player (born 1988)

No. 67
- Position: Offensive tackle

Personal information
- Born: September 23, 1988 (age 38); Fort Worth, Texas, U.S.
- Listed height: 6 ft 7 in (2.01 m)
- Listed weight: 325 lb (147 kg)

Career information
- High school: Aledo (TX)
- College: Texas
- NFL draft: 2011: undrafted

Career history
- New England Patriots (2011–2012)
- Stats at Pro Football Reference

Kyle Hix (born September 23, 1988) is a former American football offensive tackle who spent two seasons on the New England Patriots injured reserve after being signed as an undrafted free agent in 2011. He was on the team's payroll when they played in Super Bowl XLVI. He played college football at Texas where he was an All-Big 12 Conference Honorable Mention and played in the BCS Championship game.

== Early life ==
Hix was a three-sport athlete at Aledo High School. He earned all-district honors in football, basketball and track & field.

== College career ==
Hix attended the University of Texas at Austin where he played college football for the Texas Longhorns. As a true freshman, Hix played in 13 games, including one start at right guard against No. 12 Arizona State in the Holiday Bowl. During his sophomore season, Hix started all 13 games at right tackle including the 2009 Fiesta Bowl. As a junior, Hix started 14 games at right tackle. He was named an All-Big 12 honorable mention by the Associated Press and conference coaches. That season ended with him helping to win the 2009 Big 12 Championship and starting in the 2010 BCS Championship Game which the Longhorns lost.

Prior to his senior season, Hix was a member of the Outland Trophy preseason watch list. Hix went on to start 11 games at left tackle in 2010, missing one due to injury.

== Professional career ==
Hix went undrafted in the 2011 NFL draft and signed with the New England Patriots as a rookie free agent. A little over a week later he was placed on injured reserve after a shoulder injury. He spent the entire 2011 season on the IR, while the Patriots went to Super Bowl XLVI. He missed the first 9 practices in 2012 camp with the same shoulder injury and was waived before the 2012 season. He spent the 2012 season on the injured reserve list as well. Following that season, he was released by the Patriots in February 2013 without having ever played a snap in the NFL.

== Personal life ==
After the NFL, Hix returned to Aledo and became a landman with a mineral company.
