= Moses Cabrera =

American football player and coach (born 1978)

Personal information
- Born: August 20, 1978 (age 48)

Career information
- College: Oral Roberts University

Career history
- Fresno State (2004–2009) Assistant strength coach; Colorado (2010) Assistant strength and conditioning coach; New England Patriots (2011–2015) Assistant strength and conditioning coach; New England Patriots (2016–2023) Head strength and conditioning coach; UNC (2025-present) Director of Sports Performance

Awards and highlights
- 3× Super Bowl champion (XLIX, LI, LIII)

Moses Cabrera (born August 20, 1978) is an American college and professional football strength and conditioning coach. He is presently the Director of Sports Performance for North Carolina Tar Heels football. He is a graduate of Deming High School in Deming, New Mexico. He played both offense and defense for the Deming High Wildcats. Moses then went on to continue his studies at Oral Roberts University in Tulsa, Oklahoma, where he earned his B.S. in Exercise Science.

== New England Patriots ==
Cabrera was hired as the Patriots' assistant strength and conditioning coach in 2011 after Harold Nash was promoted to head strength and conditioning coach role.

In 2016, following the departure of Nash to the Detroit Lions, Cabrera was promoted to the Patriots' head strength and conditioning coach. In Cabrera's first year he was praised for helping the Patriots have the fewest players placed on Injured Reserve during the 2016 NFL Season.

Prior to the 2024 season, Cabrera left the Patriots and was replaced by his assistant, Deron Mayo. During his time with the Patriots, Cabrera won three Super Bowl titles as a member of the team staff: Super Bowl XLIX, Super Bowl LI, and Super Bowl LIII.

== North Carolina Tar Heels ==
Following the hire of Bill Belichick as the head coach of North Carolina Tar Heels football, Cabrera was announced as joining his staff at UNC as the Director of Sports Performance.
