= 2012 Pro Bowl =

National Football League all-star game

2012 NFL Pro Bowl
NFC	AFC
41	59
Head coach: Mike McCarthy (Green Bay Packers)	Head coach: Gary Kubiak (Houston Texans)
	1	2	3	4	Total
NFC	14	14	7	6	41
AFC	14	14	10	21	59
- Date: January 29, 2012
- Stadium: Aloha Stadium; Honolulu, Hawaii
- MVP: Brandon Marshall (Miami Dolphins)
- Referee: Walt Coleman
- Attendance: 48,423

Ceremonies
- National anthem: TSgt Richard Vazquez, USAF
- Coin toss: MG Rodger Mathews, U.S. Army; LtGen Thomas L. Conant, U.S. Marines & Maj Gen Darryll Wong, USAF
- Halftime show: "NFL Salute to Service" (tribute to U.S. Armed Forces)

TV in the United States
- Network: NBC
- Announcers: Dan Hicks, Mike Mayock, Doug Flutie, Alex Flanagan and Randy Moss
- Nielsen ratings: 7.9 (nationally)

The 2012 Pro Bowl was the National Football League's all-star game for the 2011 season. It took place at 2:00 pm local time on Sunday, January 29, 2012, at Aloha Stadium in Honolulu, Hawaii. The AFC defeated the NFC, 59–41.

The 59 points scored by the AFC team were a Pro Bowl record, and the combined 100 total points was third in the series' history, behind the 2004 Pro Bowl, and the 2024 Pro Bowl Games. Miami Dolphins wide receiver Brandon Marshall was named the game's Most Valuable Player after catching four touchdown passes, breaking the record for touchdown receptions in a Pro Bowl which was set by Jimmy Smith in 2004.

The AFC team was coached by Gary Kubiak of the Houston Texans while Green Bay Packers head coach Mike McCarthy led the NFC all-stars. The referee for the game was Walt Coleman.

== Scoring summary ==
Scoring Play	Score
1st quarter
NFC – Larry Fitzgerald 10 yd. pass from Aaron Rodgers (David Akers kick)	NFC 7–0
NFC – Larry Fitzgerald 44 yd. pass from Aaron Rodgers (David Akers kick)	NFC 14–0
AFC – A. J. Green 34 yd. pass from Ben Roethlisberger (Sebastian Janikowski kick)	NFC 14–7
AFC – Brandon Marshall 74 yd. pass from Ben Roethlisberger (Sebastian Janikowski kick)	Tied 14–14
2nd quarter
NFC – Jimmy Graham 2 yd. pass from Drew Brees (David Akers kick)	NFC 21–14
AFC – Brandon Marshall 29 yd. pass from Philip Rivers (Sebastian Janikowski kick)	Tied 21–21
NFC – Greg Jennings 11 yd. pass from Drew Brees (David Akers kick)	NFC 28–21
AFC – Antonio Gates 27 yd. pass from Philip Rivers (Sebastian Janikowski kick)	Tied 28–28
3rd quarter
AFC – Sebastian Janikowski 37 yd. Field Goal	AFC 31–28
NFC – Steve Smith 55 yd. pass from Cam Newton (David Akers kick)	NFC 35–31
AFC – Brandon Marshall 47 yd. pass from Andy Dalton (Sebastian Janikowski kick)	AFC 38–35
4th quarter
AFC – Vonta Leach 1 yd. run (Sebastian Janikowski kick)	AFC 45–35
AFC – Brandon Marshall 3 yd. pass from Andy Dalton (Sebastian Janikowski kick)	AFC 52–35
AFC – Derrick Johnson 60 yd. Interception Return (Sebastian Janikowski kick)	AFC 59–35
NFC – Larry Fitzgerald 36 yd. pass from Cam Newton (kick short)	AFC 59–41

== AFC roster ==
The following players were selected to represent the AFC:

=== Offense ===
Position	Starter(s)	Reserve(s)	Alternate(s)
Quarterback	12 Tom Brady, New England^{[e]}	7 Ben Roethlisberger, Pittsburgh; 17 Philip Rivers, San Diego	14 Andy Dalton, Cincinnati^{[a]}
Running back	27 Ray Rice, Baltimore^{[b]}	32 Maurice Jones-Drew, Jacksonville; 23 Arian Foster, Houston^{[b]}	23 Willis McGahee, Denver^{[a]} 24 Ryan Mathews, San Diego^{[a]}
Fullback	44 Vonta Leach, Baltimore		
Wide receiver	83 Wes Welker, New England^{[e]} 17 Mike Wallace, Pittsburgh	18 A. J. Green, Cincinnati; 19 Brandon Marshall, Miami	83 Vincent Jackson, San Diego^{[a]}
Tight end	87 Rob Gronkowski, New England^{[e]}	85 Antonio Gates, San Diego	84 Jermaine Gresham, Cincinnati^{[a]}
Offensive tackle	73 Joe Thomas, Cleveland; 77 Jake Long, Miami^{[b]}	60 D'Brickashaw Ferguson, N.Y. Jets	78 Ryan Clady, Denver^{[a]}
Offensive guard	70 Logan Mankins, New England^{[e]} 54 Brian Waters, New England^{[e]}	73 Marshal Yanda, Baltimore	65 Brandon Moore, N.Y. Jets^{[a]} 66 Ben Grubbs, Baltimore^{[a]}
Center	53 Maurkice Pouncey, Pittsburgh^{[b]}	74 Nick Mangold, N.Y. Jets	55 Chris Myers, Houston^{[a]}

=== Defense ===
Position	Starter(s)	Reserve(s)	Alternate(s)
Defensive end	93 Dwight Freeney, Indianapolis; 93 Andre Carter, New England^{[b]}^{[e]}	58 Elvis Dumervil, Denver^{[c]}	94 Antonio Smith, Houston^{[a]}
Defensive tackle	92 Haloti Ngata, Baltimore^{[b]} 75 Vince Wilfork, New England^{[e]}	92 Richard Seymour, Oakland	97 Geno Atkins, Cincinnati^{[a]} 96 Paul Soliai, Miami^{[a]}
Outside linebacker	55 Terrell Suggs, Baltimore^{[b]} 58 Von Miller, Denver	91 Tamba Hali, Kansas City	92 James Harrison, Pittsburgh^{[a]}
Inside linebacker	52 Ray Lewis, Baltimore	56 Derrick Johnson, Kansas City	
Cornerback	24 Darrelle Revis, N.Y. Jets; 24 Champ Bailey, Denver	24 Johnathan Joseph, Houston	
Free safety	20 Ed Reed, Baltimore^{[b]}	32 Eric Weddle, San Diego	25 Ryan Clark, Pittsburgh^{[a]}
Strong safety	43 Troy Polamalu, Pittsburgh^{[b]}		20 Brian Dawkins, Denver^{[a]}

=== Special teams ===
Position	Starter(s)	Reserve(s)	Alternate(s)
Punter	9 Shane Lechler, Oakland		
Placekicker	11 Sebastian Janikowski, Oakland		
Kick returner	84 Antonio Brown, Pittsburgh		
Special teamer	18 Matthew Slater, New England^{[e]}		24 Montell Owens, Jacksonville^{[a]}
Long snapper	59 Jon Condo, Oakland^{[d]}		

== NFC roster ==
The following players were selected to represent the NFC:

=== Offense ===
Position	Starter(s)	Reserve(s)	Alternate(s)
Quarterback	12 Aaron Rodgers, Green Bay	9 Drew Brees, New Orleans; 10 Eli Manning, N.Y. Giants ^{[e]}	1 Cam Newton, Carolina^{[a]}
Running back	25 LeSean McCoy, Philadelphia	22 Matt Forte, Chicago; 21 Frank Gore, San Francisco^{[b]}	24 Marshawn Lynch, Seattle^{[a]}
Fullback	30 John Kuhn, Green Bay^{[b]}		26 Michael Robinson, Seattle^{[a]}
Wide receiver	81 Calvin Johnson, Detroit^{[b]} 11 Larry Fitzgerald, Arizona	89 Steve Smith, Carolina; 85 Greg Jennings, Green Bay	84 Roddy White, Atlanta^{[a]}
Tight end	80 Jimmy Graham, New Orleans	88 Tony Gonzalez, Atlanta	
Offensive tackle	71 Jason Peters, Philadelphia; 74 Joe Staley, San Francisco	74 Jermon Bushrod, New Orleans	
Offensive guard	73 Jahri Evans, New Orleans; 77 Carl Nicks, New Orleans	75 Davin Joseph, Tampa Bay	
Center	67 Ryan Kalil, Carolina	63 Scott Wells, Green Bay	

=== Defense ===
Position	Starter(s)	Reserve(s)	Alternate(s)
Defensive end	69 Jared Allen, Minnesota; 93 Jason Babin, Philadelphia	90 Jason Pierre-Paul, N.Y. Giants^{[e]}	90 Julius Peppers, Chicago^{[a]}
Defensive tackle	94 Justin Smith, San Francisco; 90 Jay Ratliff, Dallas	90 B. J. Raji, Green Bay	
Outside linebacker	94 DeMarcus Ware, Dallas; 52 Clay Matthews, Green Bay	55 Lance Briggs, Chicago^{[b]}	52 Chad Greenway, Minnesota^{[a]}
Inside linebacker	52 Patrick Willis, San Francisco	54 Brian Urlacher, Chicago^{[b]}	59 London Fletcher, Washington^{[a]}
Cornerback	21 Charles Woodson, Green Bay; 22 Carlos Rogers, San Francisco^{[b]}	33 Charles Tillman, Chicago	39 Brandon Browner, Seattle^{[a]}
Free safety	29 Earl Thomas, Seattle	38 Dashon Goldson, San Francisco^{[b]}	31 Kam Chancellor, Seattle^{[a]}
Strong safety	24 Adrian Wilson, Arizona		

=== Special teams ===
Position	Starter(s)	Reserve(s)	Alternate(s)
Punter	4 Andy Lee, San Francisco		
Placekicker	2 David Akers, San Francisco		
Kick returner	21 Patrick Peterson, Arizona		
Special teamer	21 Corey Graham, Chicago		
Long snapper	86 Brian Jennings, San Francisco^{[d]}		

Notes:

bold player who participated in game
^{a} Replacement selection due to injury or vacancy
^{b} Injured player; selected but will not play
^{c} Replacement starter; selected as reserve
^{d} "Need player"; named by coach
^{e} Selected but did not play because his team advanced to Super Bowl XLVI

== Number of selections per team ==
American Football Conference
Team	Selections
New England Patriots	9
Baltimore Ravens	8
Pittsburgh Steelers	7
Denver Broncos	6
San Diego Chargers	5
Houston Texans	4
New York Jets	4
Oakland Raiders	4
Cincinnati Bengals	4
Miami Dolphins	3
Indianapolis Colts	2
Jacksonville Jaguars	2
Kansas City Chiefs	2
Cleveland Browns	1
Buffalo Bills	0
Tennessee Titans	0

National Football Conference
Team	Selections
San Francisco 49ers	9
Green Bay Packers	7
Chicago Bears	6
New Orleans Saints	5
Seattle Seahawks	5
Arizona Cardinals	3
Carolina Panthers	3
Philadelphia Eagles	3
Atlanta Falcons	2
Dallas Cowboys	2
Minnesota Vikings	2
New York Giants	2
Detroit Lions	1
Tampa Bay Buccaneers	1
Washington Redskins	1
St. Louis Rams	0

== Broadcasting ==
The game was televised nationally by NBC. The telecast of the game garnered a Nielsen rating of 7.9 nationally. While this represented an eight percent drop over the 2011 Pro Bowl ratings, the game was still the second most watched Pro Bowl of the past twelve years. The game drew more viewers than the 2011 Major League Baseball All-Star Game. NBC also broadcast the 2013 game as Super Bowl broadcaster CBS had declined to carry it.

== Social media ==
The NFL loosened its rules which forbid players from communicating via social media during games, by setting up a computer on each sideline to allow players to use Twitter. Washington Redskins linebacker London Fletcher used the occasion to propose a contest among his Twitter followers to predict the game's final score and MVP. However, the NFL had him rescind the offer and he instead gave away a signed jersey instead of cash, presumably on anti-gambling grounds.

== Entertainment ==
The pop band Hot Chelle Rae played during the pregame ceremonies for the game. United States Air Force Technical Sergeant Richard Vazquez sang the national anthem before the kickoff. Several representatives of the U.S. Armed Forces participated in the coin toss ceremony: Major General Rodger Mathews, U.S. Army Pacific deputy commander; Lieutenant General Thomas L. Conant, U.S. Marine Corps Pacific command deputy commander and USAF Major General Darryll Wong, adjutant general of the Hawaii Air National Guard. The halftime show, "NFL Salute to Service," was a tribute to the United States Armed Forces featuring the U.S. Army Silent Drill Team along with over a thousand service members stationed at bases in Hawaii.

== Reactions ==
Simon Samano of NFL.com wrote about the game, "Players love the trip to Hawaii but don't care for the game itself. They have no desire to risk injury in a 'meaningless' game, which is why they don't play hard, which is how you end up with 59–41 as the final score. It's that lack of effort that caused fans to boo during portions of this year's game." Green Bay Packers quarterback Aaron Rodgers stated on his radio show, "I was just surprised that some of the guys either didn’t want to play or when they were in there didn't put any effort into it." The Pro Bowl has different rules than a regular season NFL game. Blitzing is not allowed and the 4–3 formation must always be used in defensive formations.

NFL commissioner Roger Goodell, speaking a week after the game, stated that the 2012 Pro Bowl wasn't "the kind of football we want to be demonstrating to our fans, and you heard it from the fans, the fans were actively booing in the stands. ... We are going to either have to improve the quality of what we are doing in the Pro Bowl or consider other changes, or even consider eliminating the game if that is the kind of quality of game we are going to provide."

Philip Rivers also questioned some of the players efforts in the Pro Bowl game. Rivers discussed with Bill Williamson during an interview “In general, maybe the whole week should be up for discussion, but I know there are guys in the game whose contracts may be up and they don’t want to get hurt and things like that. Still, we have to think of the fans and try to stay true to the game and not make a joke or a mockery out of the game."
