= Marcus Cannon =

American football player (born 1988)

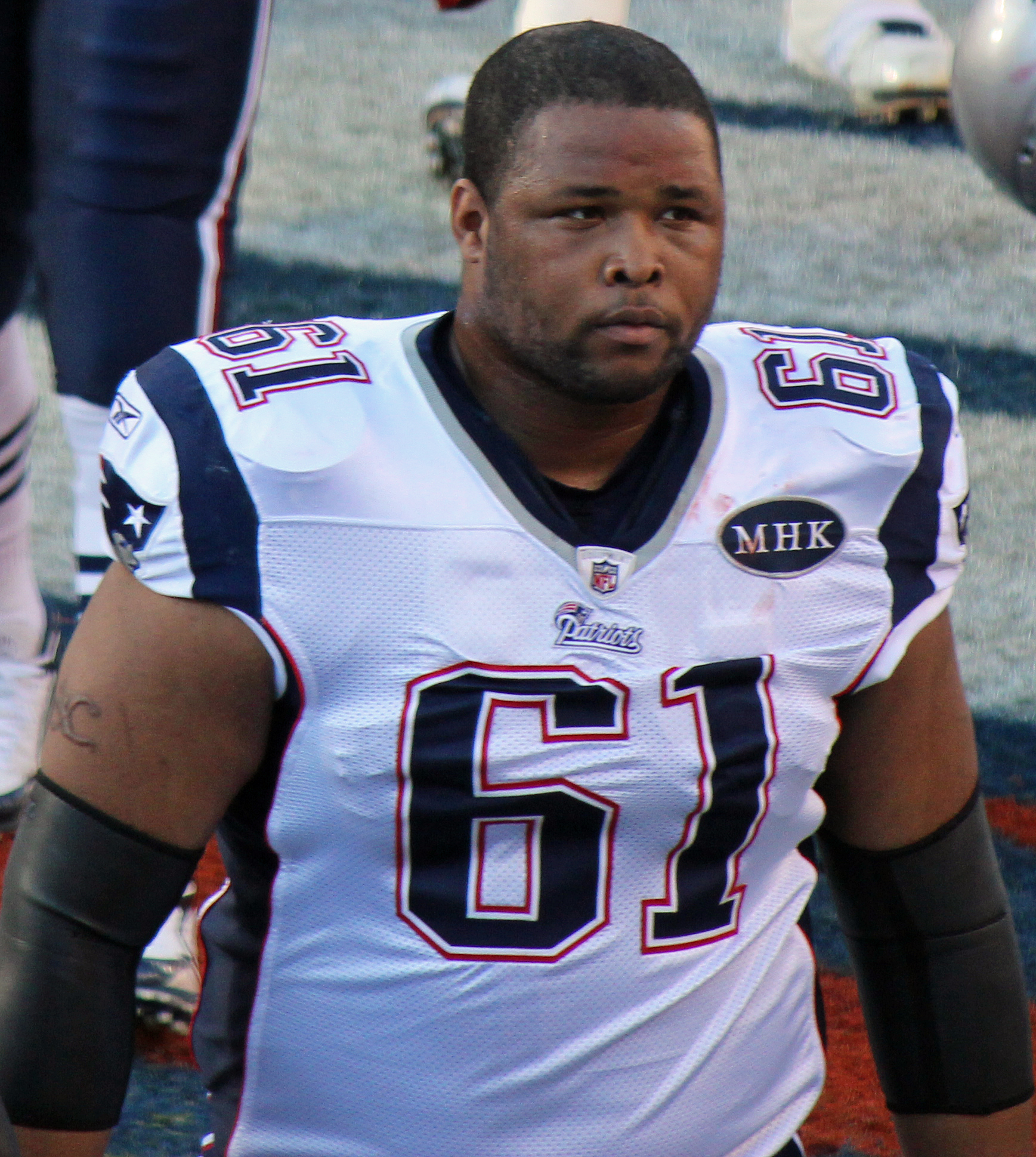
- Cannon with the New England Patriots in 2011

No. 61
- Position: Offensive tackle

Personal information
- Born: May 6, 1988 (age 38); Roswell, New Mexico, U.S.
- Listed height: 6 ft 6 in (1.98 m)
- Listed weight: 335 lb (152 kg)

Career information
- High school: Odessa (Odessa, Texas)
- College: TCU
- NFL draft: 2011: 5th round, 138th overall pick

Career history
- New England Patriots (2011–2020); Houston Texans (2021); New England Patriots (2022)

Awards and highlights
- 3× Super Bowl champion (XLIX, LI, LIII); Second-team All-Pro (2016); Third-team All-American (2010); 2× First-team All-MW (2009, 2010)

Career NFL statistics
- Games played: 124
- Games started: 77
- Stats at Pro Football Reference

Marcus Darell Cannon (born May 6, 1988) is an American former professional football player who was an offensive tackle in the National Football League (NFL). He played college football for the TCU Horned Frogs. Prior to the 2011 NFL draft, Cannon was considered one of the top offensive tackle prospects and was selected by the New England Patriots in the fifth round with the 138th overall pick.

During the 2011 NFL Combine, Cannon's physical showed irregularities; further testing led to a diagnosis of non-Hodgkin lymphoma, for which Cannon underwent treatment during the summer of 2011.

== College career ==
Cannon played college football at Texas Christian University, where he played right tackle for his first three seasons, before switching to left tackle his senior year, protecting the blind side of quarterback Andy Dalton. In 2009, he did not give up a single sack; in 2010, he was part of an offensive line that gave up a total of just nine sacks all year.

== Professional career ==
Pre-draft measurables
Height	Weight	Arm length	Hand span	Wingspan	40-yard dash	10-yard split	20-yard split	20-yard shuttle	Three-cone drill	Vertical jump	Broad jump	Bench press	Wonderlic
6 ft 5 in (1.96 m)	358 lb (162 kg)	34 in (0.86 m)	9 1/8 in (0.23 m)	6 ft 9 3/8 in (2.07 m)	5.26 s	1.86 s	3.07 s	4.97 s	8.07 s	30.5 in (0.77 m)	8 ft 11 in (2.72 m)	33 reps	28
All values from NFL Combine/Pro Day

=== New England Patriots (first stint) ===
The New England Patriots selected Cannon in the fifth round, with the 138th pick, acquired in a trade from the Houston Texans. Cannon's late selection in the draft is widely attributed to his diagnosis of non-Hodgkin lymphoma pre-draft. Weighing in at 358 pounds at the NFL Combine, Cannon is the heaviest player ever drafted by the Patriots, and the second-heaviest player in team history after nose tackle Ted Washington, who played with the team in the 2003 season. (At TCU's pro day in March 2011, Cannon was measured at 349 pounds.) Although he played offensive tackle throughout his TCU career, the Patriots listed Cannon as an offensive guard when announcing the pick.

Cannon began the 2011 season on the Non-Football Injury list as he recuperated from his chemotherapy treatment, which took place during the NFL lockout. Cannon was activated to the 53-man roster after the Patriots' Week 10 game against the New York Jets, and saw his first snaps in the NFL at right tackle on the Patriots' final drive against the Kansas City Chiefs in Week 11. Cannon was selected as the Patriots' 2011 recipient for the Ed Block Courage Award.

Cannon played in all 18 of the Patriots' regular and postseason games during the 2012 NFL season, including one start in place of right tackle Sebastian Vollmer. After Vollmer went on injured reserve in late October of the 2013 season, Cannon started the rest of the season for New England at right tackle. Cannon began the 2014 season as the Patriots' starting left guard but struggled in the first three games and was moved back to his previous role as a swing tackle after rookie Bryan Stork took over as the starting center. On Dec 11, Cannon signed a two-year extension worth up to $9 million, including a $3.2 million signing bonus. On February 1, 2015, Cannon was a member of the New England Patriots when they won Super Bowl XLIX. In the 2015 season, Cannon appeared in the fewest regular-season games—12—since his rookie season because of a toe injury. Nonetheless, he also started the most games of his career at eight.

Cannon entered the 2016 Patriots training camp in what he called "the best shape of his life." After struggling the previous season while dealing with the toe injury, his play improved significantly during the 2016 season. After starting right tackle Sebastian Vollmer had shoulder surgery during the offseason was ruled out for the season, Cannon became the starting right tackle. With his significant improvement and performance through the first 11 games of the season, Cannon signed a five-year, $32.5 million contract extension with the Patriots through 2021. For his performance in the 2016 season, Cannon was named second-team All-Pro by Pro Football Focus and The Associated Press. On February 5, 2017, Cannon was part of the Patriots team that won Super Bowl LI. In the game, the Patriots defeated the Atlanta Falcons by a score of 34–28 in overtime. The game featured the first overtime game in Super Bowl history and the largest comeback in the Super Bowl.

Cannon started the 2017 season as the Patriots' starting right tackle. He started seven games before suffering an ankle injury in Week 8. He missed the next five games before being placed on injured reserve on December 13, 2017. The Patriots were able to reach Super Bowl LII without Cannon, but failed to repeat as Super Bowl Champions after losing 41–33 to the Philadelphia Eagles.

Cannon entered 2018 as the Patriots starting right tackle. He missed Week 2 with a calf injury and Weeks 9 and 10 with a head injury. Overall he started 13 games in 2018. With Cannon, the Patriots were able to reach Super Bowl LIII where they defeated the Los Angeles Rams 13–3.

On September 9, 2019, in the Patriots Week 1 matchup against the Pittsburgh Steelers, Cannon sustained a shoulder injury in the fourth quarter, which caused him to miss a couple of months.

On July 28, 2020, Cannon announced his decision to opt out of the 2020 season, due to concerns over the ongoing COVID-19 pandemic.

=== Houston Texans ===
On March 17, 2021, Cannon and 2021 fifth- and sixth-round picks were traded to the Houston Texans for fourth- and sixth-round picks. He was named the Texans starting right tackle for 2021. He was placed on injured reserve on October 9, 2021.

On March 15, 2022, Cannon was released by the Texans.

=== New England Patriots (second stint) ===
On September 13, 2022, Cannon was signed to the Patriots practice squad. He was promoted to the active roster on October 5. He started two games at right tackle before being placed on injured reserve on November 5.

== Personal life ==
Cannon was born in Roswell, New Mexico. He graduated from TCU with a communications degree and on top of football was also all conference in the shot put. Cannon was diagnosed with cancer in 2011 after a biopsy was conducted at the request of two different NFL teams. Despite the mass's having been ruled as benign in 2006, it was found to be cancerous. Cannon underwent treatment and has been in remission since late 2011. Marcus Cannon and his wife Alyssa were married in 2012. The couple has four children.
