= 12th NFL Honors =

2023 American football awards ceremony

- Date: February 9, 2023
- Site: Phoenix Symphony Hall (Phoenix, Arizona)
- Hosted by: Kelly Clarkson

Television coverage
- Network: NBC/Peacock/NFL Network
- Duration: 2 hours

The 12th NFL Honors was an awards presentation by the National Football League that honored its players from the 2022 NFL season. It was held on February 9, 2023, at the Phoenix Symphony Hall in Phoenix, Arizona. After not airing the ceremony last year due to the 2022 Winter Olympics, NBC aired this year's ceremony instead of usual broadcaster Fox which is airing the Super Bowl this season (with Peacock streaming the ceremony) along with NFL Network. Kelly Clarkson hosted, making her the first woman to host the presentation.

== List of award winners ==
Award	Winner	Position	Team	Ref
AP Most Valuable Player	Patrick Mahomes	QB	Kansas City Chiefs	
AP Coach of the Year	Brian Daboll	HC	New York Giants	
AP Assistant Coach of the Year	DeMeco Ryans	DC	San Francisco 49ers	
AP Offensive Player of the Year	Justin Jefferson	WR	Minnesota Vikings	
AP Defensive Player of the Year	Nick Bosa	DE	San Francisco 49ers	
Pepsi NFL Rookie of the Year	Aidan Hutchinson	DE	Detroit Lions	
AP Offensive Rookie of the Year	Garrett Wilson	WR	New York Jets	
AP Defensive Rookie of the Year	Sauce Gardner	CB	New York Jets	
AP Comeback Player of the Year	Geno Smith	QB	Seattle Seahawks	
Walter Payton NFL Man of the Year	Dak Prescott	QB	Dallas Cowboys	
Salute to Service award	Ron Rivera	HC	Washington Commanders	
FedEx Air Player of the Year	Joe Burrow	QB	Cincinnati Bengals	
FedEx Ground Player of the Year	Josh Jacobs	RB	Las Vegas Raiders	
Bud Light Celly of the Year	Cincinnati Bengals roller-coaster celebration	Team	Cincinnati Bengals	
Deacon Jones Award	Nick Bosa	DE	San Francisco 49ers	
Jim Brown Award	Josh Jacobs	RB	Las Vegas Raiders	
Art Rooney Award	Calais Campbell	DE	Baltimore Ravens	
Next Gen Stats Moment of the Year	Justin Jefferson catch against the Bills	WR	Minnesota Vikings	
NFL Fan of the Year	Larry Bevans	—	Seattle Seahawks	
Pro Football Hall of Fame Class of 2023	Ronde Barber	DB		
Pro Football Hall of Fame Class of 2023	Don Coryell	HC		
Pro Football Hall of Fame Class of 2023	Chuck Howley	LB		
Pro Football Hall of Fame Class of 2023	Joe Klecko	DL		
Pro Football Hall of Fame Class of 2023	Darrelle Revis	DB		
Pro Football Hall of Fame Class of 2023	Ken Riley	DB		
Pro Football Hall of Fame Class of 2023	Joe Thomas	OT		
Pro Football Hall of Fame Class of 2023	Zach Thomas	LB		
Pro Football Hall of Fame Class of 2023	DeMarcus Ware	LB		
