= 10th NFL Honors =

2021 American football awards ceremony

- Date: February 6, 2021
- Site: Straz Center (Tampa, Florida); Raymond James Stadium (Tampa); SoFi Stadium (Inglewood, California)
- Hosted by: Steve Harvey

Television coverage
- Network: CBS/CBS All Access
- Duration: Two hours

The 10th NFL Honors was an awards presentation by the National Football League that honored its players from the 2020 NFL season. Due to the COVID-19 pandemic, it was a multi-site ceremony, with two sites being used in the host city of Tampa, Florida; the Straz Center for the Performing Arts and host stadium Raymond James Stadium, and SoFi Stadium in Inglewood, California.

For the third consecutive year, Steve Harvey hosted the show. Harvey joined Alec Baldwin as the only two people to host the show three times. The show featured performances by Green Day during the opening segment and Leslie Odom Jr. during the in-memoriam segment.

This is the first NFL honors to air live as opposed to prerecorded same day broadcast as in previous years and the third time that the ceremony was streamed on a streaming service (on CBS All Access)

== List of award winners ==
Award	Winner	Position	Team	Ref
AP Most Valuable Player	Aaron Rodgers	QB	Green Bay Packers	
AP Coach of the Year	Kevin Stefanski	HC	Cleveland Browns	
AP Assistant Coach of the Year	Brian Daboll	OC	Buffalo Bills	
AP Offensive Player of the Year	Derrick Henry	RB	Tennessee Titans	
AP Defensive Player of the Year	Aaron Donald	DT	Los Angeles Rams	
Pepsi Next Rookie of the Year	Justin Herbert	QB	Los Angeles Chargers	
AP Offensive Rookie of the Year	Justin Herbert	QB	Los Angeles Chargers	
AP Defensive Rookie of the Year	Chase Young	DE	Washington Football Team	
AP Comeback Player of the Year	Alex Smith	QB	Washington Football Team	
Walter Payton NFL Man of the Year	Russell Wilson	QB	Seattle Seahawks	
FedEx Air Player of the Year	Aaron Rodgers	QB	Green Bay Packers	
FedEx Ground Player of the Year	Derrick Henry	RB	Tennessee Titans	
Bridgestone Performance Play of the Year	Kyler Murray and DeAndre Hopkins for the Hail Murray	QB / WR	Arizona Cardinals	
DraftKings Daily Fantasy Player of the Year	Josh Allen	QB	Buffalo Bills	
Bud Light Celly of the Year	Chase Claypool	WR	Pittsburgh Steelers	
Deacon Jones Award	T. J. Watt	LB	Pittsburgh Steelers	
Art Rooney Award	Teddy Bridgewater	QB	Carolina Panthers	
Bart Starr Award	Demario Davis	LB	New Orleans Saints	
Snickers Hungriest Player of the Year	Kyler Murray	QB	Arizona Cardinals	
Pro Football Hall of Fame Class of 2021	Alan Faneca	OL		
Pro Football Hall of Fame Class of 2021	Tom Flores	HC		
Pro Football Hall of Fame Class of 2021	Calvin Johnson	WR		
Pro Football Hall of Fame Class of 2021	John Lynch	S		
Pro Football Hall of Fame Class of 2021	Peyton Manning	QB		
Pro Football Hall of Fame Class of 2021	Bill Nunn	Scout		
Pro Football Hall of Fame Class of 2021	Drew Pearson	WR		
Pro Football Hall of Fame Class of 2021	Charles Woodson	DB		

== Winners and candidates ==
†	= First time recipient
‡	= Successive recipient

Positions key
Offense	Defense	Special teams
**QB** — Quarterback; **RB** — Running back; **FB** — Fullback; **WR** — Wide receiver; **TE** — Tight end; **OL** — Offensive lineman; **T** — Tackle; **G** — Guard; **C** — Center	**DL** — Defensive lineman; **DT** — Defensive tackle (Note: Includes nose tackle (NT)); **DE** — Defensive end; **EDGE** — Edge rusher; **LB** — Linebacker (Note: Includes middle linebacker (MLB/MIKE), weakside linebacker (WILL), strongside linebacker (SAM), off-ball linebacker, and outside linebacker (OLB)); **DB** — Defensive back; **CB** — Cornerback; **S** — Safety (Note: Includes free safety (FS) and strong safety (SS))	**K** — Kicker (Note: Also known as a placekicker (PK)); **P** — Punter; **LS** — Long snapper; **RS** — Return specialist (Note: Includes kickoff and punt returners)

Winners are denoted in bold

=== AP Most Valuable Player ===
Player	Position	Team
**Aaron Rodgers** ‡	QB	Green Bay Packers
Patrick Mahomes	QB	Kansas City Chiefs
Josh Allen	QB	Buffalo Bills

=== AP Coach of the Year ===
Player	Team
**Kevin Stefanski** †	Cleveland Browns
Sean McDermott	Buffalo Bills
Brian Flores	Miami Dolphins

=== AP Offensive Player of the Year ===
Player	Position	Team
**Derrick Henry** †	RB	Tennessee Titans
Aaron Rodgers	QB	Green Bay Packers
Patrick Mahomes	QB	Kansas City Chiefs

=== AP Defensive Player of the Year ===
Player	Position	Team
**Aaron Donald** ‡	DT	Los Angeles Rams
Xavien Howard	CB	Miami Dolphins
T. J. Watt	LB	Pittsburgh Steelers

=== Pepsi Next Rookie of the Year ===
Player	Position	Team
**Justin Herbert** †	QB	Los Angeles Chargers
James Robinson	RB	Jacksonville Jaguars
Jonathan Taylor	RB	Indianapolis Colts
Chase Young	DE	Washington Football Team
Justin Jefferson	WR	Minnesota Vikings

=== FedEx Air Player of the Year ===
Player	Position	Team
**Aaron Rodgers** ‡	QB	Green Bay Packers
Patrick Mahomes	QB	Kansas City Chiefs
Josh Allen	QB	Buffalo Bills

=== FedEx Ground Player of the Year ===
Player	Position	Team
Dalvin Cook	RB	Minnesota Vikings
**Derrick Henry** ‡	RB	Tennessee Titans
Alvin Kamara	RB	New Orleans Saints

=== Walter Payton NFL Man of the Year award ===
Player	Position	Team
Corey Peters	NT	Arizona Cardinals
Steven Means	DE	Atlanta Falcons
Bradley Bozeman	G	Baltimore Ravens
Harrison Phillips	DT	Buffalo Bills
Shaq Thompson	LB	Carolina Panthers
Jimmy Graham	TE	Chicago Bears
Geno Atkins	DT	Cincinnati Bengals
Myles Garrett	DE	Cleveland Browns
Jaylon Smith	LB	Dallas Cowboys
Justin Simmons	FS	Denver Broncos
Trey Flowers	DE	Detroit Lions
Corey Linsley	C	Green Bay Packers
Michael Thomas	FS	Houston Texans
Jacoby Brissett	QB	Indianapolis Colts
Josh Lambo	K	Jacksonville Jaguars
Travis Kelce	TE	Kansas City Chiefs
Alec Ingold	FB	Las Vegas Raiders
Isaac Rochell	DE	Los Angeles Chargers
Andrew Whitworth	OT	Los Angeles Rams
Byron Jones	CB	Miami Dolphins
Eric Kendricks	LB	Minnesota Vikings
Devin McCourty	FS	New England Patriots
Demario Davis	LB	New Orleans Saints
Dalvin Tomlinson	NT	New York Giants
Pierre Desir	CB	New York Jets
Rodney McLeod	S	Philadelphia Eagles
Vance McDonald	TE	Pittsburgh Steelers
Arik Armstead	DE	San Francisco 49ers
**Russell Wilson** †	QB	Seattle Seahawks
Mike Evans	WR	Tampa Bay Buccaneers
Kevin Byard	S	Tennessee Titans
Jonathan Allen	DT	Washington Football Team
