= 13th NFL Honors =

2024 American football awards ceremony

- Date: February 8, 2024
- Site: Resorts World Theatre (Las Vegas, Nevada)
- Hosted by: Keegan-Michael Key

Television coverage
- Network: CBS/Paramount+/NFL Network/NFL+
- Duration: 2 hours

The 13th NFL Honors was an awards presentation by the National Football League that honored its players from the 2023 NFL season. It was held on February 8, 2024, at the Resorts World Theatre in Las Vegas, Nevada. CBS aired this year's ceremony (with Paramount+ streaming the ceremony) along with NFL Network (and streaming on NFL+). Keegan-Michael Key hosted, making him his third time to host the presentation (he previously hosted in 2017 and 2022).

== List of award winners ==
Award	Winner	Position	Team	Ref
AP Most Valuable Player	Lamar Jackson	QB	Baltimore Ravens	
AP Coach of the Year	Kevin Stefanski	HC	Cleveland Browns	
AP Assistant Coach of the Year	Jim Schwartz	DC	Cleveland Browns	
AP Offensive Player of the Year	Christian McCaffrey	RB	San Francisco 49ers	
AP Defensive Player of the Year	Myles Garrett	DE	Cleveland Browns	
Pepsi NFL Rookie of the Year	C. J. Stroud	QB	Houston Texans	
AP Offensive Rookie of the Year	C. J. Stroud	QB	Houston Texans	
AP Defensive Rookie of the Year	Will Anderson Jr.	DE	Houston Texans	
AP Comeback Player of the Year	Joe Flacco	QB	Cleveland Browns	
Walter Payton NFL Man of the Year	Cameron Heyward	DT	Pittsburgh Steelers	
Salute to Service award	Joe Cardona	LS	New England Patriots	
FedEx Air Player of the Year	Brock Purdy	QB	San Francisco 49ers	
FedEx Ground Player of the Year	Christian McCaffrey	RB	San Francisco 49ers	
Bud Light Celly of the Year	Tommy DeVito	QB	New York Giants	
Deacon Jones Award	T. J. Watt	LB	Pittsburgh Steelers	
Jim Brown Award	Christian McCaffrey	RB	San Francisco 49ers	
Art Rooney Award	Bobby Wagner	LB	Seattle Seahawks	
Moment of the Year	CeeDee Lamb catch against the Lions	WR	Dallas Cowboys	
NFL Fan of the Year	Tom Grossi	—	Green Bay Packers	
Pro Football Hall of Fame Class of 2024	Dwight Freeney	DE/LB		
Pro Football Hall of Fame Class of 2024	Randy Gradishar	LB		
Pro Football Hall of Fame Class of 2024	Devin Hester	WR/KR		
Pro Football Hall of Fame Class of 2024	Andre Johnson	WR		
Pro Football Hall of Fame Class of 2024	Steve McMichael	DT		
Pro Football Hall of Fame Class of 2024	Julius Peppers	DE/LB		
Pro Football Hall of Fame Class of 2024	Patrick Willis	LB		
