= 11th NFL Honors =

2022 American football awards ceremony

- Date: February 10, 2022
- Site: YouTube Theater (Inglewood, California)
- Hosted by: Keegan-Michael Key

Television coverage
- Network: ABC/ESPN+/NFL Network
- Duration: Two hours

The 11th NFL Honors was an awards presentation by the National Football League that honored its players from the 2021 NFL season. It was held on February 10, 2022, at YouTube Theater in the SoFi Entertainment District in Los Angeles. Keegan-Michael Key hosted the NFL honors for his second time. This is the first presentation where it was held on a Thursday instead of a Saturday and was aired for the first time on ABC and NFL Network (with ESPN+ streaming the ceremony), and this was the first time that all of the Big Four television networks have aired the ceremony at least once (as the honors have previously been broadcast by whichever network airs the Super Bowl in a given year), as that year's Super Bowl broadcaster, NBC, carried the 2022 Winter Olympics.

== List of award winners ==
Award	Winner	Position	Team	Ref
AP Most Valuable Player	Aaron Rodgers	QB	Green Bay Packers	
AP Coach of the Year	Mike Vrabel	HC	Tennessee Titans	
AP Assistant Coach of the Year	Dan Quinn	DC	Dallas Cowboys	
AP Offensive Player of the Year	Cooper Kupp	WR	Los Angeles Rams	
AP Defensive Player of the Year	T. J. Watt	LB	Pittsburgh Steelers	
Pepsi NFL Rookie of the Year	Ja'Marr Chase	WR	Cincinnati Bengals	
AP Offensive Rookie of the Year	Ja'Marr Chase	WR	Cincinnati Bengals	
AP Defensive Rookie of the Year	Micah Parsons	LB	Dallas Cowboys	
AP Comeback Player of the Year	Joe Burrow	QB	Cincinnati Bengals	
Walter Payton NFL Man of the Year	Andrew Whitworth	OT	Los Angeles Rams	
Salute to Service award presented by USAA	Andrew Beck	FB	Denver Broncos	
FedEx Air Player of the Year	Tom Brady	QB	Tampa Bay Buccaneers	
FedEx Ground Player of the Year	Jonathan Taylor	RB	Indianapolis Colts	
Bridgestone Performance Play of the Year	Justin Tucker	K	Baltimore Ravens	
DraftKings Daily Fantasy Player of the Year	Cooper Kupp	WR	Los Angeles Rams	
Bud Light Celly of the Year	Christian Wilkins	DE	Miami Dolphins	
Deacon Jones Award	T. J. Watt	LB	Pittsburgh Steelers	
Art Rooney Award	Matthew Slater	WR	New England Patriots	
Bart Starr Award	Russell Wilson	QB	Seattle Seahawks	
Pro Football Hall of Fame Class of 2022	Tony Boselli	OT		
Pro Football Hall of Fame Class of 2022	Cliff Branch	WR		
Pro Football Hall of Fame Class of 2022	Leroy Butler	DB		
Pro Football Hall of Fame Class of 2022	Sam Mills	LB		
Pro Football Hall of Fame Class of 2022	Art McNally	Official		
Pro Football Hall of Fame Class of 2022	Richard Seymour	DE		
Pro Football Hall of Fame Class of 2022	Dick Vermeil	HC		
Pro Football Hall of Fame Class of 2022	Bryant Young	DT/DE		
