= 7th NFL Honors =

2018 American football awards ceremony

- Date: February 3, 2018
- Site: Northrop Auditorium (Minneapolis, Minnesota)
- Hosted by: Rob Riggle

Television coverage
- Network: NBC
- Duration: 2 hours

The 7th NFL Honors was an awards presentation by the National Football League that honored its best players from the 2017 NFL season. It was held on February 3, 2018 at 5:00 PM CT and pre-recorded for same-day broadcast on NBC in the United States at 9:00 PM/8:00 PM CT.

== List of award winners ==
Award	Player	Position	Team	Ref
AP MVP	Tom Brady	QB	New England Patriots	
AP Coach of the Year	Sean McVay	HC	Los Angeles Rams	
AP Assistant Coach of the Year	Pat Shurmur	OC	Minnesota Vikings	
AP Offensive Player of the Year	Todd Gurley	RB	Los Angeles Rams	
AP Defensive Player of the Year	Aaron Donald	DT	Los Angeles Rams	
Pepsi NEXT Rookie of the Year	Alvin Kamara	RB	New Orleans Saints	
AP Offensive Rookie of the Year	Alvin Kamara	RB	New Orleans Saints	
AP Defensive Rookie of the Year	Marshon Lattimore	CB	New Orleans Saints	
AP Comeback Player of the Year	Keenan Allen	WR	Los Angeles Chargers	
Don Shula NFL High School Coach of the Year award	Robert Garrett	HC	Crenshaw High School	
Walter Payton NFL Man of the Year award	J. J. Watt	DE	Houston Texans	
FedEx Air Player of the Year	Carson Wentz	QB	Philadelphia Eagles	
FedEx Ground Player of the Year	Todd Gurley	RB	Los Angeles Rams	
Bridgestone Performance Play of the Year	The "Minneapolis Miracle"		Minnesota Vikings	
Greatness on the Road award	Deshaun Watson	QB	Houston Texans	
Game Changer award presented by Secret	Samantha Gordon	RB		
Salute to Service award	Andre Roberts	WR	Atlanta Falcons	
Deacon Jones Award	Chandler Jones	OLB	Arizona Cardinals	
Art Rooney Award	Luke Kuechly	LB	Carolina Panthers	
Castrol EDGE Clutch Performer of the Year	Drew Brees	QB	New Orleans Saints	
Built Ford Tough Offensive Line of the Year	Halapoulivaati Vaitai	LT	Philadelphia Eagles	
Built Ford Tough Offensive Line of the Year	Stefen Wisniewski	LG	Philadelphia Eagles	
Built Ford Tough Offensive Line of the Year	Jason Kelce	C	Philadelphia Eagles	
Built Ford Tough Offensive Line of the Year	Brandon Brooks	RG	Philadelphia Eagles	
Built Ford Tough Offensive Line of the Year	Lane Johnson	RT	Philadelphia Eagles	
Pro Football Hall of Fame Class of 2018	Bobby Beathard	GM		
Pro Football Hall of Fame Class of 2018	Robert Brazile	LB		
Pro Football Hall of Fame Class of 2018	Brian Dawkins	S		
Pro Football Hall of Fame Class of 2018	Jerry Kramer	G		
Pro Football Hall of Fame Class of 2018	Ray Lewis	LB		
Pro Football Hall of Fame Class of 2018	Randy Moss	WR		
Pro Football Hall of Fame Class of 2018	Terrell Owens	WR		
Pro Football Hall of Fame Class of 2018	Brian Urlacher	LB		
Celebration of the Year	Philadelphia Eagles Electric Slide		Philadelphia Eagles	
