= 14th NFL Honors =

2025 American football awards ceremony

- Date: February 6, 2025
- Site: Saenger Theater (New Orleans, Louisiana)
- Hosted by: Snoop Dogg

Television coverage
- Network: Fox, NFL Network, NFL+
- Duration: 2 hours

The 14th NFL Honors was an awards ceremony presented by the National Football League that honored players, coaches, and moments from the 2024 NFL season. It was held on February 6, 2025, at the Saenger Theater in New Orleans, Louisiana. It was broadcast by Fox and NFL Network (with NFL+ streaming the ceremony) and was hosted by rapper Snoop Dogg. Buffalo Bills quarterback Josh Allen was presented with the AP NFL Most Valuable Player award at the ceremony. Inductees for the 2025 Pro Football Hall of Fame class were also announced at the event.

== List of award winners ==
14th NFL Honors winners
Award	Winner	Position	Team	Ref.
Most Valuable Player	Josh Allen	Quarterback	Buffalo Bills	
Offensive Player of the Year	Saquon Barkley	Running back	Philadelphia Eagles	
Defensive Player of the Year	Patrick Surtain II	Cornerback	Denver Broncos	
Offensive Rookie of the Year	Jayden Daniels	Quarterback	Washington Commanders	
Defensive Rookie of the Year	Jared Verse	Outside linebacker	Los Angeles Rams	
Comeback Player of the Year	Joe Burrow	Quarterback	Cincinnati Bengals	
Coach of the Year	Kevin O'Connell	Head coach	Minnesota Vikings	
Assistant Coach of the Year	Ben Johnson	Offensive coordinator	Detroit Lions	
Walter Payton NFL Man of the Year	Arik Armstead	Defensive end	Jacksonville Jaguars	
Salute to Service	George Kittle	Tight end	San Francisco 49ers	
Deacon Jones Award	Trey Hendrickson	Defensive end	Cincinnati Bengals	
Jim Brown Award	Saquon Barkley	Running back	Philadelphia Eagles	
Art Rooney Award	Josh Allen	Quarterback	Buffalo Bills	
Moment of the Year	Hail Maryland (Note: Hail Mary pass from Jayden Daniels to Noah Brown. The award was accepted by Daniels.)	—N/a	Washington Commanders	
FedEx Air Player of the Year	Josh Allen	Quarterback	Buffalo Bills	
FedEx Ground Player of the Year	Ja'Marr Chase	Wide receiver	Cincinnati Bengals	
Pepsi Rookie of the Year	Jayden Daniels	Quarterback	Washington Commanders	
Fan of the Year	Megan Stefanski	—N/a	Detroit Lions	

Pro Football Hall of Fame Class of 2025
Players	Position	Team(s)	Ref.
Eric Allen	Cornerback	Philadelphia Eagles (1988–1994); New Orleans Saints (1995–1997); Oakland Raiders (1998–2001)	
Jared Allen	Defensive end	Kansas City Chiefs (2004–2007); Minnesota Vikings (2008–2013); Chicago Bears (2014–2015); Carolina Panthers (2015)	
Antonio Gates	Tight end	San Diego / Los Angeles Chargers (2003–2018)	
Sterling Sharpe	Wide receiver	Green Bay Packers (1988–1994)	
