= 9th NFL Honors =

2020 American football awards ceremony

- Date: February 1, 2020
- Site: Adrienne Arsht Center (Miami, Florida)
- Hosted by: Steve Harvey

Television coverage
- Network: Fox
- Duration: Two hours

The 9th NFL Honors was an awards presentation by the National Football League that honored its players from the 2019 NFL season. It was held on February 1, 2020, at the Adrienne Arsht Center in Miami, Florida and was pre-recorded for same-day broadcast on Fox in the United States at 8:00 PM/7:00 CT. Five inductees announced during taping of the ceremony will be inducted into the Pro Football Hall of Fame in Canton, Ohio August 5–9, 2021, the event having been postponed due to the COVID-19 pandemic. It was hosted by Steve Harvey for the second consecutive year.

== List of award winners ==
Award	Player	Position	Team	Ref
AP MVP	Lamar Jackson	QB	Baltimore Ravens	
AP NFL Coach of the Year	John Harbaugh	HC	Baltimore Ravens	
AP Assistant Coach of the Year	Greg Roman	OC	Baltimore Ravens	
AP Offensive Player of the Year	Michael Thomas	WR	New Orleans Saints	
AP Defensive Player of the Year	Stephon Gilmore	CB	New England Patriots	
Pepsi Next Rookie of the Year	Nick Bosa	DE	San Francisco 49ers	
AP Offensive Rookie of the Year	Kyler Murray	QB	Arizona Cardinals	
AP Defensive Rookie of the Year	Nick Bosa	DE	San Francisco 49ers	
AP Comeback Player of the Year	Ryan Tannehill	QB	Tennessee Titans	
Don Shula NFL High School Coach of the year	Matt Land	HC	Dalton High School	
Walter Payton NFL Man of the Year award	Calais Campbell	DE	Jacksonville Jaguars	
FedEx Air Player of the Year	Lamar Jackson	QB	Baltimore Ravens	
FedEx Ground Player of the Year	Derrick Henry	RB	Tennessee Titans	
Bridgestone Performance Play of the Year	Matt Haack & Jason Sanders	P & K	Miami Dolphins	
Courtyard Unstoppable Performance of the Year	Patrick Mahomes	QB	Kansas City Chiefs	
Microsoft Surface Anything But Ordinary Player of the Year	Larry Fitzgerald	WR	Arizona Cardinals	
DraftKings Daily Fantasy Player of the Year	Christian McCaffrey	RB	Carolina Panthers	
Bud Light Celly of the Year	None	WR corps	Seattle Seahawks	
Salute to Service award presented by USAA	Donnie Edwards	LB	Los Angeles Chargers	
Deacon Jones Award	Shaquil Barrett	LB	Tampa Bay Buccaneers	
Art Rooney Award	Adrian Peterson	RB	Washington Redskins	
Bart Starr Award	Eli Manning	QB	New York Giants	
Pro Football Hall of Fame Class of 2020	Steve Atwater	S		
Pro Football Hall of Fame Class of 2020	Isaac Bruce	WR		
Pro Football Hall of Fame Class of 2020	Steve Hutchinson	G		
Pro Football Hall of Fame Class of 2020	Edgerrin James	RB		
Pro Football Hall of Fame Class of 2020	Troy Polamalu	S		

== Winners and candidates ==
†	= First time recipient
‡	= Successive recipient

Positions key
Offense	Defense	Special teams
**QB** — Quarterback; **RB** — Running back; **FB** — Fullback; **WR** — Wide receiver; **TE** — Tight end; **OL** — Offensive lineman; **T** — Tackle; **G** — Guard; **C** — Center	**DL** — Defensive lineman; **DT** — Defensive tackle (Note: Includes nose tackle (NT)); **DE** — Defensive end; **EDGE** — Edge rusher; **LB** — Linebacker (Note: Includes middle linebacker (MLB/MIKE), weakside linebacker (WILL), strongside linebacker (SAM), off-ball linebacker, and outside linebacker (OLB)); **DB** — Defensive back; **CB** — Cornerback; **S** — Safety (Note: Includes free safety (FS) and strong safety (SS))	**K** — Kicker (Note: Also known as a placekicker (PK)); **P** — Punter; **LS** — Long snapper; **RS** — Return specialist (Note: Includes kickoff and punt returners)

Winners are denoted in bold

=== AP MVP ===
Player	Position	Team	Notes
**Lamar Jackson** †	QB	Baltimore Ravens	Second unanimous AP MVP in history

=== AP Coach of the Year ===
Player	Team
**John Harbaugh** †	Baltimore Ravens
Matt LaFleur	Green Bay Packers
Sean McDermott	Buffalo Bills
Mike Tomlin	Pittsburgh Steelers
Kyle Shanahan	San Francisco 49ers
Sean Payton	New Orleans Saints

=== AP Offensive Player of the Year ===
Player	Position	Team
**Michael Thomas** †	WR	New Orleans Saints
Lamar Jackson	QB	Baltimore Ravens
Christian McCaffrey	RB	Carolina Panthers

=== AP Defensive Player of the Year ===
Player	Position	Team
**Stephon Gilmore** †	CB	New England Patriots
Chandler Jones	DE/LB	Arizona Cardinals
Aaron Donald	DT	Los Angeles Rams
T. J. Watt	DE/LB	Pittsburgh Steelers

=== AP Offensive Rookie of the Year ===
Player	Position	Team
**Kyler Murray** †	QB	Arizona Cardinals
A. J. Brown	WR	Tennessee Titans
Josh Jacobs	RB	Oakland Raiders

=== AP Defensive Rookie of the Year ===
Player	Position	Team
**Nick Bosa** †	DE	San Francisco 49ers
Maxx Crosby	DE	Oakland Raiders
Josh Allen	DE	Jacksonville Jaguars
