= List of Baltimore Ravens award winners =

This page lists the awards won by players of the Baltimore Ravens, a professional American football team who compete in the National Football League. The Ravens' most recent award winners were Lamar Jackson John Harbaugh and Greg Roman, who won the MVP, Coach of the Year and Assistant Coach of the Year awards respectively at the 9th annual NFL Honors.

== Individual league awards ==
=== Associated Press NFL Most Valuable Player Award ===
- 2019: Lamar Jackson, QB
- 2023: Lamar Jackson, QB

=== Associated Press NFL Offensive Player of the Year Award ===
- 2003: Jamal Lewis, RB

=== Associated Press NFL Defensive Player of the Year Award ===
- 2000: Ray Lewis, LB
- 2003: Ray Lewis, LB
- 2004: Ed Reed, S
- 2011: Terrell Suggs, LB

=== Associated Press NFL Defensive Rookie of the Year Award ===
- 1997: Peter Boulware, LB
- 2003: Terrell Suggs, LB

=== Super Bowl Most Valuable Player Award ===
- 2001 (XXXV): Ray Lewis, LB
- 2013 (XLVII): Joe Flacco, QB

=== Associated Press NFL Coach of the Year Award ===
- 2019: John Harbaugh

=== Associated Press NFL Assistant Coach of the Year Award ===
- 2019: Greg Roman

=== Walter Payton NFL Man of the Year Award ===
- 2011: Matt Birk, C

=== NFLPA Alan Page Community Award ===
- 2001: Michael McCrary, DE

=== Bart Starr Award ===
- 2018: Benjamin Watson, TE

=== Butkus Award ===
- 2022: Roquan Smith, LB
- 2023: Roquan Smith, LB

=== George Halas Award ===
- 2014: O. J. Brigance

=== Polynesian Football Player of the Year Award ===
- 2019: Ronnie Stanley, OT
