= 4th NFL Honors =

2015 American football awards ceremony

- Date: January 31, 2015
- Site: Phoenix Symphony Hall (Phoenix, Arizona)
- Hosted by: Seth Meyers

Television coverage
- Network: NBC
- Duration: 2 hours

The 4th NFL Honors was an awards presentation by the National Football League honoring its best players and other individuals from the 2014 NFL season. It was held on January 31, 2015, and aired on NBC in the United States. Seth Meyers hosted the show. For the second year, the newest Pro Football Hall of Fame class was announced and introduced during the show with the Class of 2015 appearing on stage at Symphony Hall in Phoenix. Unlike the previous three NFL Honors presentations, the GMC Never Say Never Moment of the Year award was not presented; although Aaron Rodgers was announced as the winner of the 2014 season award.

== List of award winners ==
Award	Player	Position	Team	Ref
AP MVP	Aaron Rodgers	Quarterback	Green Bay Packers	
AP Coach of the Year	Bruce Arians	Head Coach	Arizona Cardinals	
AP Assistant Coach of the Year	Todd Bowles	Defensive coordinator	Arizona Cardinals	
AP Offensive Player of the Year	DeMarco Murray	Running back	Dallas Cowboys	
AP Defensive Player of the Year	J. J. Watt	Defensive end	Houston Texans	
Pepsi NEXT Rookie of the Year	Teddy Bridgewater	Quarterback	Minnesota Vikings	
AP Offensive Rookie of the Year	Odell Beckham Jr.	Wide receiver	New York Giants	
AP Defensive Rookie of the Year	Aaron Donald	Defensive tackle	St. Louis Rams	
AP Comeback Player of the Year	Rob Gronkowski	Tight end	New England Patriots	
NFL.com Fantasy Player of the Year	Le'Veon Bell	Running back	Pittsburgh Steelers	
Don Shula NFL High School Coach of the Year award	Bruce Larson	Head Coach	Somerset High School (Wisconsin)	
Walter Payton NFL Man of the Year award	Thomas Davis	Linebacker	Carolina Panthers	
FedEx Air Player of the Year	Aaron Rodgers	Quarterback	Green Bay Packers	
FedEx Ground Player of the Year	Le'Veon Bell	Running back	Pittsburgh Steelers	
Bridgestone Performance Play of the Year	Odell Beckham Jr.	Wide receiver	New York Giants	
Greatness on the Road award	Tony Romo	Quarterback	Dallas Cowboys	
Salute to Service award	Jared Allen	Defensive end	Chicago Bears	
Deacon Jones Award	Justin Houston	Outside linebacker	Kansas City Chiefs	
Art Rooney Award	Larry Fitzgerald	Wide receiver	Arizona Cardinals	
