= 3rd NFL Honors =

2014 American football awards ceremony

- Date: February 1, 2014
- Site: Radio City Music Hall (New York City)
- Hosted by: Alec Baldwin

Television coverage
- Network: FOX
- Duration: 2 hours

The 3rd NFL Honors was an awards presentation by the National Football League honoring its best players from the 2013 NFL season. It was held on February 1, 2014, at Radio City Music Hall. Alec Baldwin returned for the third year to host the show. The show aired on Fox. Unlike previous NFL seasons, the Pro Football Hall of Fame announced its HOF Class of 2014 inductees during this award presentation.

== Award winners ==
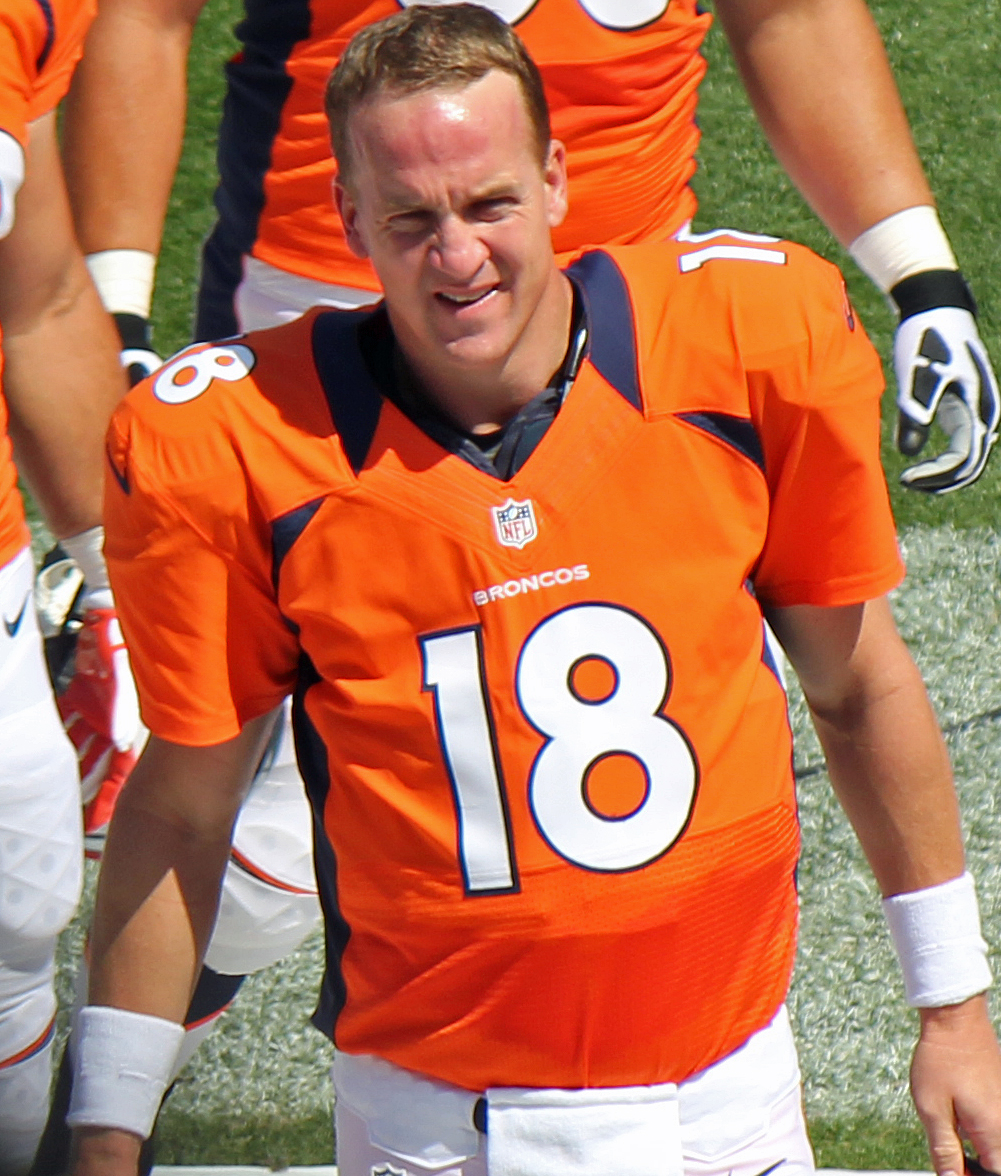
Peyton Manning, winner of 2 awards

Award	Player	Position	Team	Ref
AP MVP	Peyton Manning	Quarterback	Denver Broncos	
AP Coach of the Year	Ron Rivera	Head Coach	Carolina Panthers	
AP Offensive Player of the Year	Peyton Manning	Quarterback	Denver Broncos	
AP Defensive Player of the Year	Luke Kuechly	Linebacker	Carolina Panthers	
Pepsi NEXT Rookie of the Year	Keenan Allen	Wide receiver	San Diego Chargers	
AP Offensive Rookie of the Year	Eddie Lacy	Running back	Green Bay Packers	
AP Defensive Rookie of the Year	Sheldon Richardson	Defensive end	New York Jets	
AP Comeback Player of the Year	Philip Rivers	Quarterback	San Diego Chargers	
GMC Never Say Never Moment of the Year	Aaron Rodgers	Quarterback	Green Bay Packers	
NFL.com Fantasy Player of the Year	Jamaal Charles	Running back	Kansas City Chiefs	
Don Shula NFL High School Coach of the Year award	Mike Grant	Head Coach	Eden Prairie (Minn.)	
Walter Payton NFL Man of the Year award	Charles Tillman	Cornerback	Chicago Bears	
FedEx Air Player of the Year	Peyton Manning	Quarterback	Denver Broncos	
FedEx Ground Player of the Year	LeSean McCoy	Running back	Philadelphia Eagles	
Bridgestone Performance Play of the Year	Calvin Johnson	Wide receiver	Detroit Lions	
Greatness on the Road award	Nick Foles	Quarterback	Philadelphia Eagles	
Salute to Service award	John Harbaugh	Head Coach	Baltimore Ravens	
Deacon Jones Award	Robert Mathis	Outside linebacker	Indianapolis Colts	
