= Michelob Ultra Arena =

Event center in Las Vegas, Nevada, United States

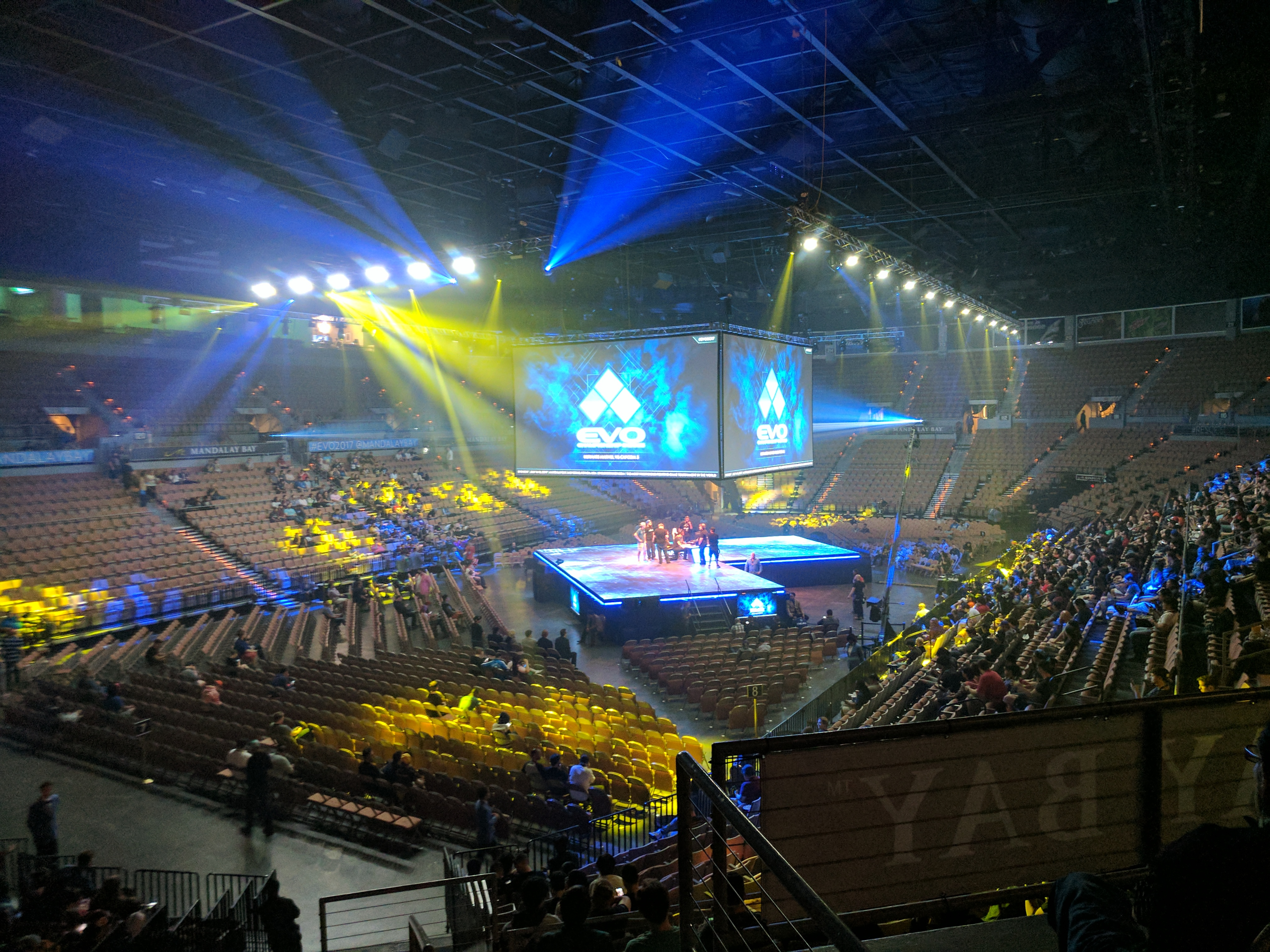
- Interior of venue during Evo 2017

- Location in Nevada Location in the United States Location in North America
- Interactive map of Michelob Ultra Arena
- Former names: Mandalay Bay Events Center (1999–2021)
- Address: 3950 South Las Vegas Boulevard
- Location: Paradise, Nevada, U.S.
- Coordinates: 36°5′26.44″N 115°10′44.33″W
- Owner: MGM Resorts International
- Operator: MGM Resorts International
- Capacity: 12,000
- Type: Arena

Construction
- Built: 1998; 28 years ago
- Opened: April 10, 1999; 27 years ago

Tenants
- Las Vegas Aces (WNBA) (2018–present); Las Vegas Desert Dogs (NLL) (2022–2024)

Website
- Venue Website

Michelob Ultra Arena (formerly Mandalay Bay Events Center) is a 12,000-seat multi-purpose indoor arena at the Mandalay Bay Resort and Casino, located on the Las Vegas Strip in Paradise, Nevada, United States. It is owned and operated by MGM Resorts International and was opened on April 10, 1999. MGM and brewing company Anheuser-Busch entered a naming-rights agreement in 2021, naming the arena after the company's Michelob Ultra beer.

It is the home arena for the Las Vegas Aces of the Women's National Basketball Association and was previously home to the Las Vegas Desert Dogs of the National Lacrosse League. The arena also hosts a variety of music, sports and entertainment events.

== History ==
The facility opened as the Mandalay Bay Events Center on April 10, 1999, with a performance by opera singer Luciano Pavarotti, appearing in his first Las Vegas concert since 1985. The facility opened a month after the Mandalay Bay resort, and included a 30,218 sq ft (2,807.3 m^{2}) floor. The venue was originally planned to include 8,000 seats, but boxing promoter Bob Arum convinced Mandalay Resort Group to increase this to 12,000. The Mandalay Bay Events Center gave Las Vegas its third musical arena, joining the Thomas & Mack Center and the MGM Grand Garden Arena.

MGM Mirage acquired Mandalay Resort Group and the venue in 2005, and was later renamed MGM Resorts International. Around 2014, MGM considered turning the facility into a theater, before deciding to build the Park Theater (now known as "Dolby Live") instead. In February 2021, the venue was renamed Michelob Ultra Arena, through a partnership with brewing company Anheuser-Busch. It is named after the company's Michelob Ultra beer.

== Sports ==
=== Combat sports ===
The arena hosts boxing matches, including the high-profile Juan Manuel Márquez vs. Manny Pacquiao II Super featherweight title unification, match on March 15 2008.

As of July 2018, the Mandalay Bay Events Center has held 31 Ultimate Fighting Championship (UFC) events, starting with UFC 33, and most recently, UFC Fight Night 88. It held the largest UFC weigh-in show in history in conjunction with International Fight Week 2012 ahead of UFC 148 welcoming 10,000 fans. UFC cards in Vegas have since moved to T-Mobile Arena as part of a comprehensive marketing and tenancy agreement.

The 999th episode of WWE Raw was held at the arena on July 16, 2012, the first time the WWE performed at Mandalay Bay.

=== Basketball ===
==== Las Vegas Aces and the WNBA ====
The Las Vegas Aces are the primary long-term tenant of the arena. The NBA and WNBA officially announced on October 17, 2017, that the San Antonio Stars would relocate from San Antonio, Texas, and would be playing at the Mandalay Bay Events Center starting in the 2018 season as the Las Vegas Aces. They played their first home game on May 27, 2018. The arena has hosted the Aces in the WNBA Finals three times, in 2022, 2023, and 2025. The Aces have five banners hanging from the rafters at the arena: one for the retirement of Becky Hammon's number 25, three for their WNBA championships in 2022, 2023, and 2025, and one for their 2022 Commissioner's Cup championship.

The arena has hosted the WNBA All-Star Game and related All-Star events three times: 2019, 2021, and 2023.

==== NBA ====
The first National Basketball Association game on the Las Vegas Strip since 1981 was at the Mandalay Bay Events Center on October 6, 2012, a preseason contest between the Denver Nuggets and the Los Angeles Clippers. The teams returned for preseason games in 2013 and 2014.

==== NBA G League ====
During the 2021–22 NBA G League season, the Michelob Ultra Arena would serve as one of the temporary home arenas for the Capitanes de la Ciudad de México during their inaugural season at the NBA G League despite also being temporarily stationed at Fort Worth, Texas at the time due to the long-term effects of the COVID-19 pandemic. Not only that, but it would also serve as the neutral hosting site for the Showcase Cup Tournament for the G League (which would continue its existence following the 2021–22 season), as well as the home arena for the NBA G League Ignite during that entire season for them, including a couple of exhibition games played against the Capitanes.

==== USA Basketball ====
In 2021, Michelob Ultra Arena hosted a training camp for USA Basketball prior to their departure for the 2020 Summer Olympics in Tokyo, Japan.

==== College ====
The arena hosted the NCAA Men's basketball postseason tournament Vegas 16 in its only season, 2016. In 2021, the arena hosted the UNLV Runnin' Rebels basketball for a game against the Seattle Redhawks while the National Finals Rodeo occupied UNLV's home arena, the Thomas & Mack Center. Michelob Ultra Arena also played hosted to the Pac-12 Conference women's basketball tournament from 2021 to 2023.

=== Box Lacrosse ===
On August 29, 2017, the National Lacrosse League (NLL) announced that Las Vegas had been awarded an NLL franchise to begin playing in December 2022 for the 2022–2023 season. The team became known as the Las Vegas Desert Dogs. The team moved to the nearby Lee's Family Forum in Henderson starting with the 2024–25 season.

=== Esports ===
The 2016 Spring North American League of Legends Championship Series Finals were hosted at the Mandalay Bay Events Center on April 16 and 17, 2016.

From 2016 to 2023, the Evolution Championship Series fighting game tournament has held its final day of competition at the Mandalay Bay Events Center.

== Entertainment events ==
Rock band Journey performed at the arena in December 2000 which was filmed for the Journey 2001 DVD.

VH1 held the first two Rock Honors ceremonies in this facility in 2006 and 2007.

It was the host of Yanni's Yanni Live! The Concert Event, in 2006.

The arena hosted Crüe Fest on August 1, 2008.

It played host to 311's biennial 3-11 Day concert on March 11, 2010. The band played four sets with 60 songs total.

The arena hosted the 2010 revival of the Lilith Fair on July 9.

On August 23, 2010, the arena served as the venue for Miss Universe 2010 where at the conclusion of the event Ximena Navarrete of Mexico was crowned as the winner.

January 28, 2011, Ozzy Osbourne performed as part of his tour for his new album Let Me Hear You Scream.

The cast of Glee were there on the first stop on their Glee Live! In Concert! tour on May 21, 2011.

On May 14, 2017, the arena hosted Miss USA 2017 pageant.

The 25th Billboard Latin Music Awards was held in the Events Center on April 26, 2018.

British heavy metal band Iron Maiden performed for their The Future Past World Tour on October 5, 2024.

In February 2024, Michelob Ultra Arena hosted the 2024 NFL Honors.

The Arena will host the upcoming Call of Duty World Championship in July 2026

=== Latin Grammy Awards ===
The arena has hosted the Latin Grammy Awards seven times. The Latin Grammys were held at the Mandalay Bay Events Center in 2007 and from 2009 to 2013. The arena hosted the Latin Grammy Awards for a seventh time in 2022.

== In popular culture ==
Footage of a boxing match between Oscar De La Hoya and Oba Carr, taking place at the Mandalay Bay Events Center, was used in the 1999 film Play It to the Bone. The final boxing match in the 2006 film Rocky Balboa was also filmed at the venue.

== See also ==
- Mandalay Bay
- MGM Resorts International
- Las Vegas Strip
- Las Vegas Aces
- Las Vegas Desert Dogs
- Sports in the Las Vegas metropolitan area

Events and tenants
Preceded by AT&T Center	Home of the Las Vegas Aces; 2018–present	Succeeded by Current
Preceded by First arena	Home of the Las Vegas Desert Dogs; 2022–2024	Succeeded by Lee's Family Forum
Preceded by Taube Tennis Center	Fed Cup; Final Four venue 2000	Succeeded by Juan Carlos I Park
Preceded by Continental Airlines Arena	Ultimate Fighting Championship venue UFC 33	Succeeded by MGM Grand Garden Arena
Preceded by Imperial Ballroom at Atlantis Paradise Island (The Bahamas) Paradise Island	Miss Universe Venue; 2010	Succeeded by Credicard Hall (Brazil) São Paulo
Preceded by T-Mobile Arena	Miss USA Venue; 2017	Succeeded by Hirsch Memorial Coliseum
