= Maryland Miracle =

Maryland Miracle may refer to:

- Hail Maryland, a 2024 American football Hail Mary pass thrown by Washington Commanders quarterback Jayden Daniels to Noah Brown to win a game against the Chicago Bears, also known as the Maryland Miracle.
- "Maryland Miracle" shot, a 1984 off-balance game winning basketball shot by Washington Bullets shooting guard Jeff Malone.
