= 1st NFL Honors =

2012 American football awards ceremony

- Date: February 4, 2012
- Site: Murat Theatre (Indianapolis, Indiana)
- Hosted by: Alec Baldwin

Television coverage
- Network: NBC
- Ratings: 2.2

The 1st NFL Honors was the inaugural ceremony of the NFL Honors, an awards show presented by the National Football League, to salute the best players and plays from the 2011 NFL season. The event was held at the Murat Theatre in Indianapolis, Indiana, on February 4, 2012, and was hosted by Alec Baldwin. The show aired on NBC and recorded a 2.2 rating with 3.524 million viewers.

== List of award winners ==
Award	Player	Position	Team	Ref
AP MVP	Aaron Rodgers	Quarterback	Green Bay Packers	
AP Offensive Player	Drew Brees	Quarterback	New Orleans Saints	
AP Defensive Player	Terrell Suggs	Outside linebacker	Baltimore Ravens	
Pepsi NFL Rookie of the Year	Cam Newton	Quarterback	Carolina Panthers	
AP Offensive Rookie	Cam Newton	Quarterback	Carolina Panthers	
AP Defensive Rookie	Von Miller	Outside linebacker	Denver Broncos	
AP Head Coach	Jim Harbaugh	NFL Head Coach	San Francisco 49ers	
AP Comeback Player of the Year	Matthew Stafford	Quarterback	Detroit Lions	
Play of the Year	Randall Cobb	Wide receiver	Green Bay Packers	
GMC Never Say Never Moment	Tim Tebow	Quarterback	Denver Broncos	
NFL.com Fantasy Player	Calvin Johnson	Wide receiver	Detroit Lions	
Madden Most Valuable Protectors award	New Orleans Saints	Offensive line	New Orleans Saints	
Walter Payton Man of the Year award	Matt Birk	Center	Baltimore Ravens	
Don Shula NFL High School Coach award	John McKissick	High School Head Coach	Summerville High School	
NFL Salute to Service award	Bud Adams	Owner	Houston Oilers/Tennessee Titans	

== Gallery ==
The following is a gallery of the winners of the awards at the NFL Honors

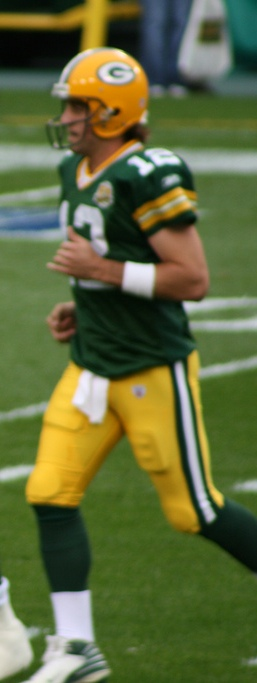
Aaron Rodgers: The NFL MVP

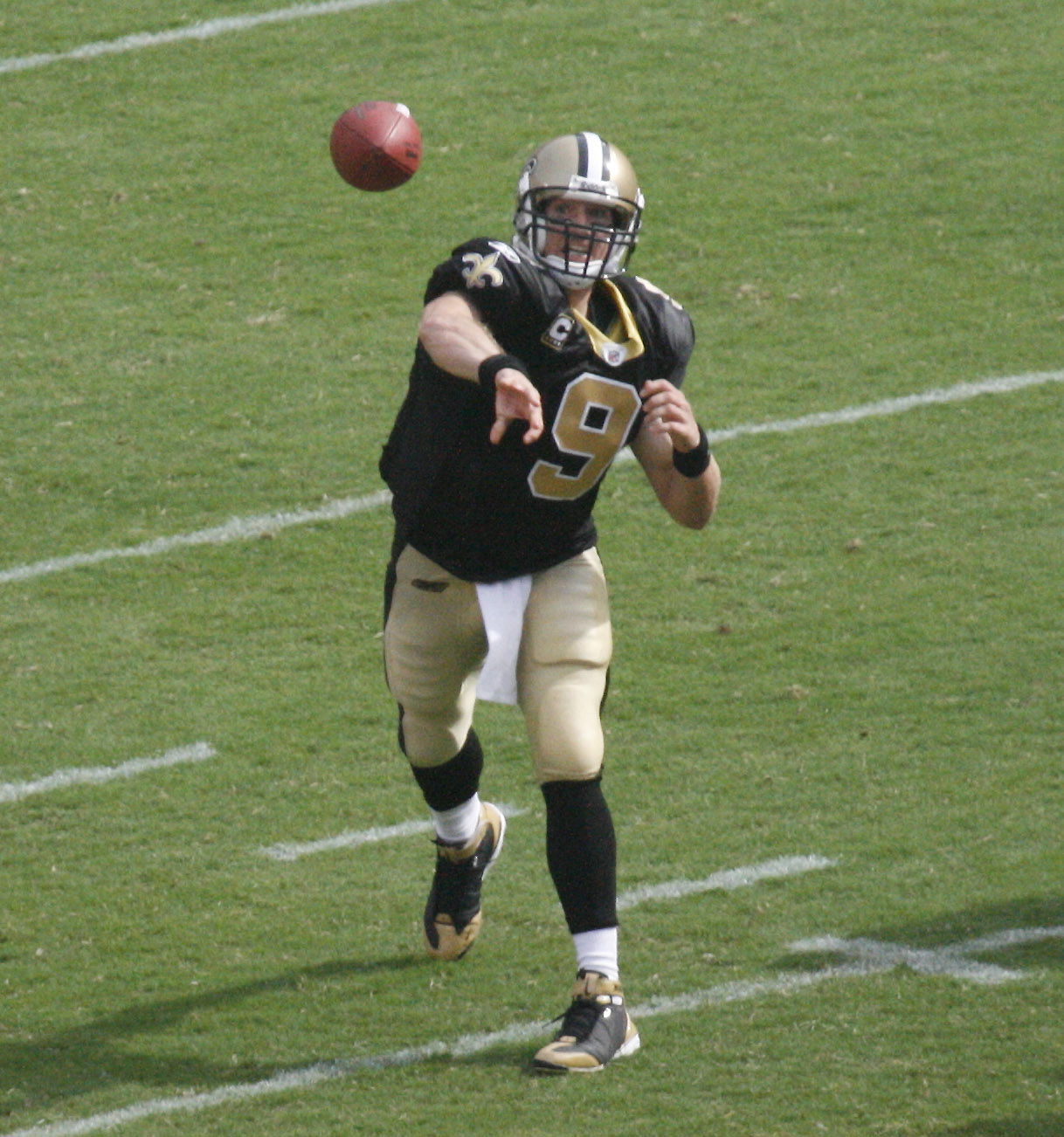
Drew Brees: The NFL Offensive Player of the Year

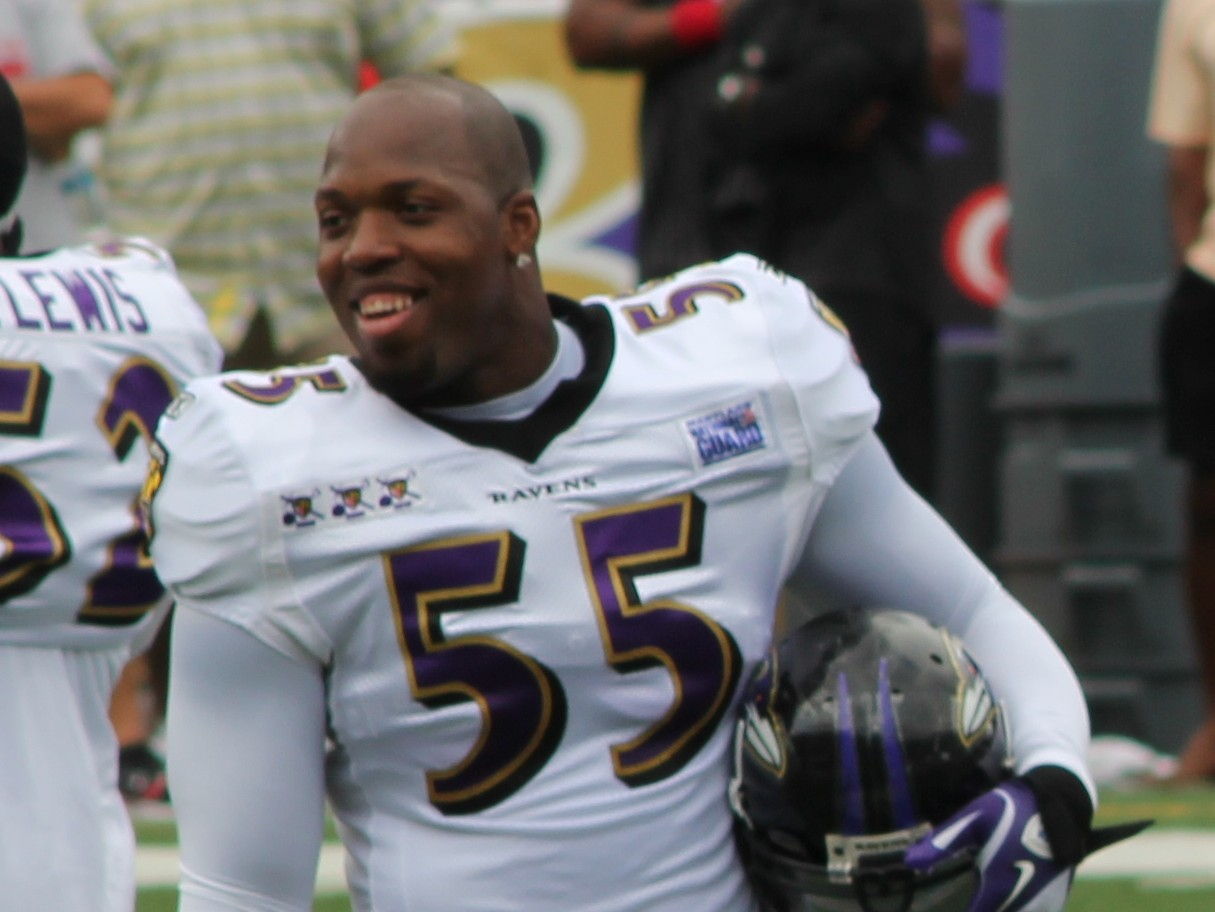
Terrell Suggs: The NFL Defensive Player of the Year

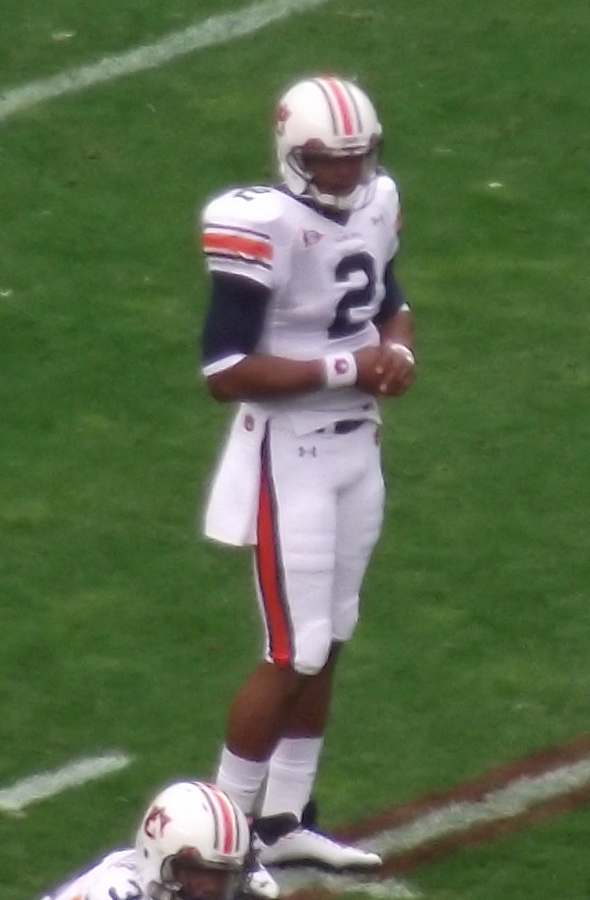
Cam Newton: The NFL Rookie of the Year and Offensive Rookie of the Year

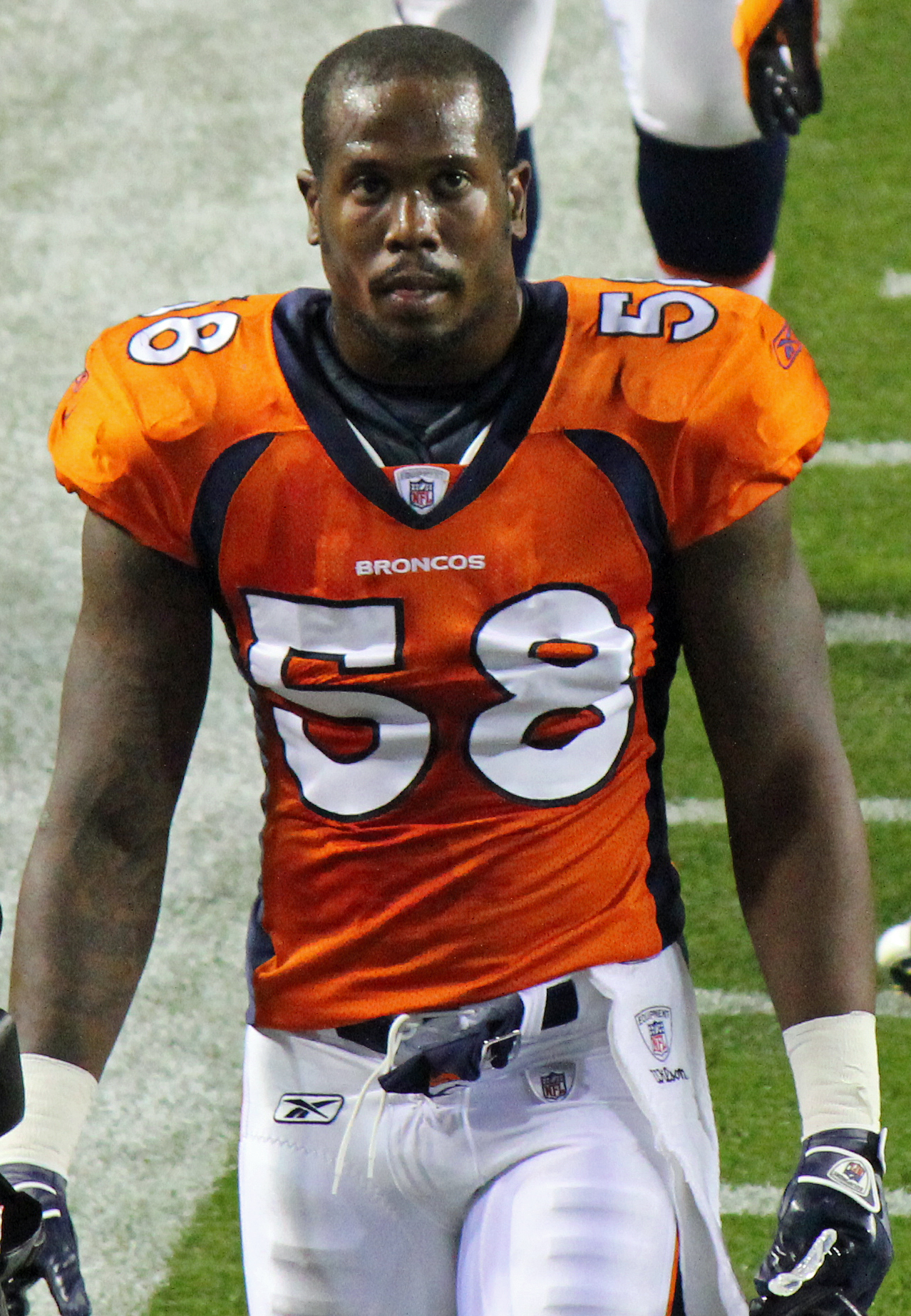
Von Miller: The Defensive Rookie of the Year

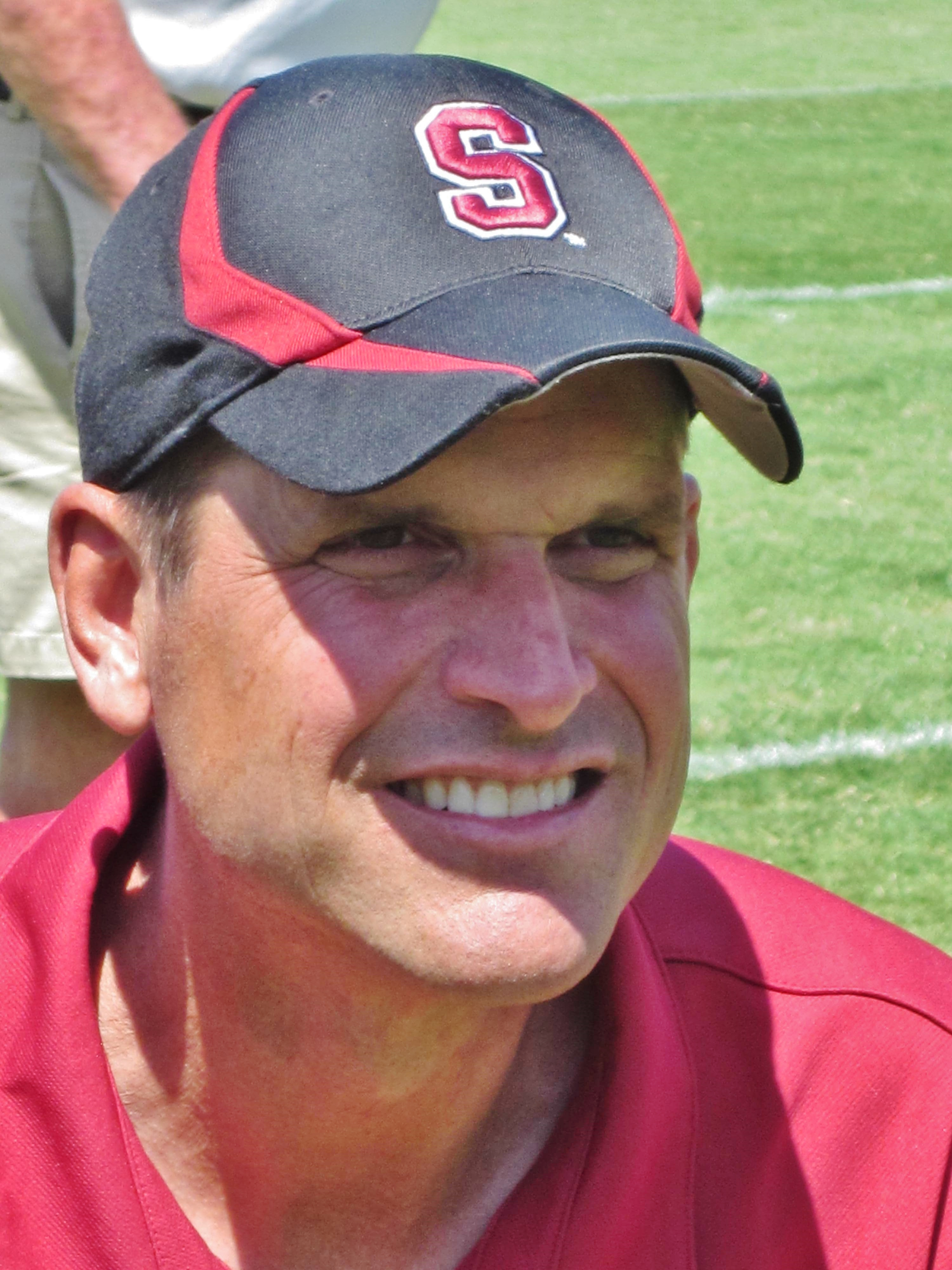
Jim Harbaugh: The NFL Coach of the Year

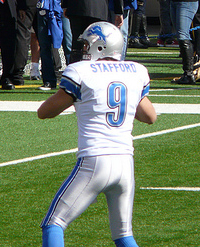
" Matthew Stafford: The NFL Comeback Player of the Year

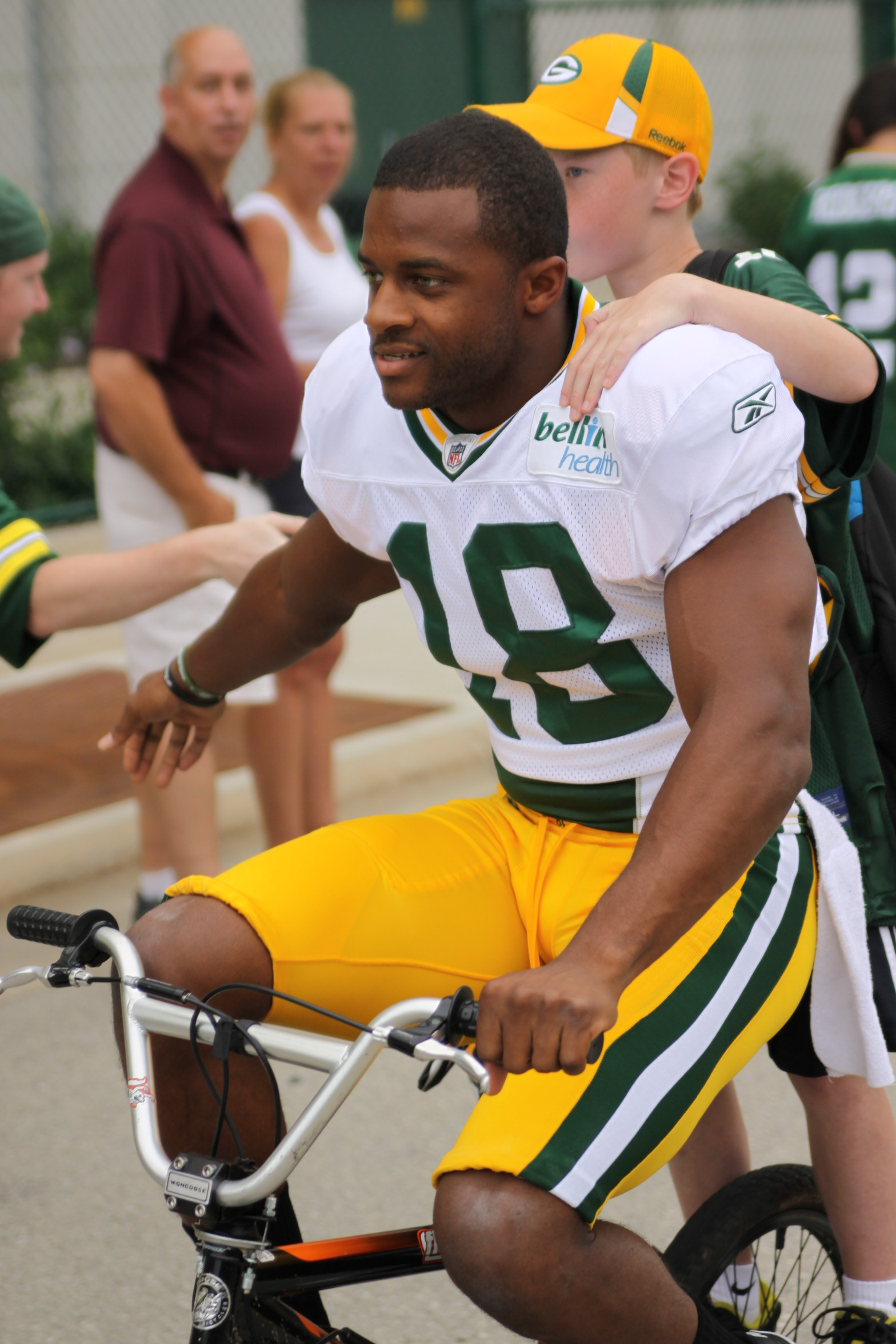
Randall Cobb: The winner of the Play of the Year Award for his 108-yard kickoff return in Week One

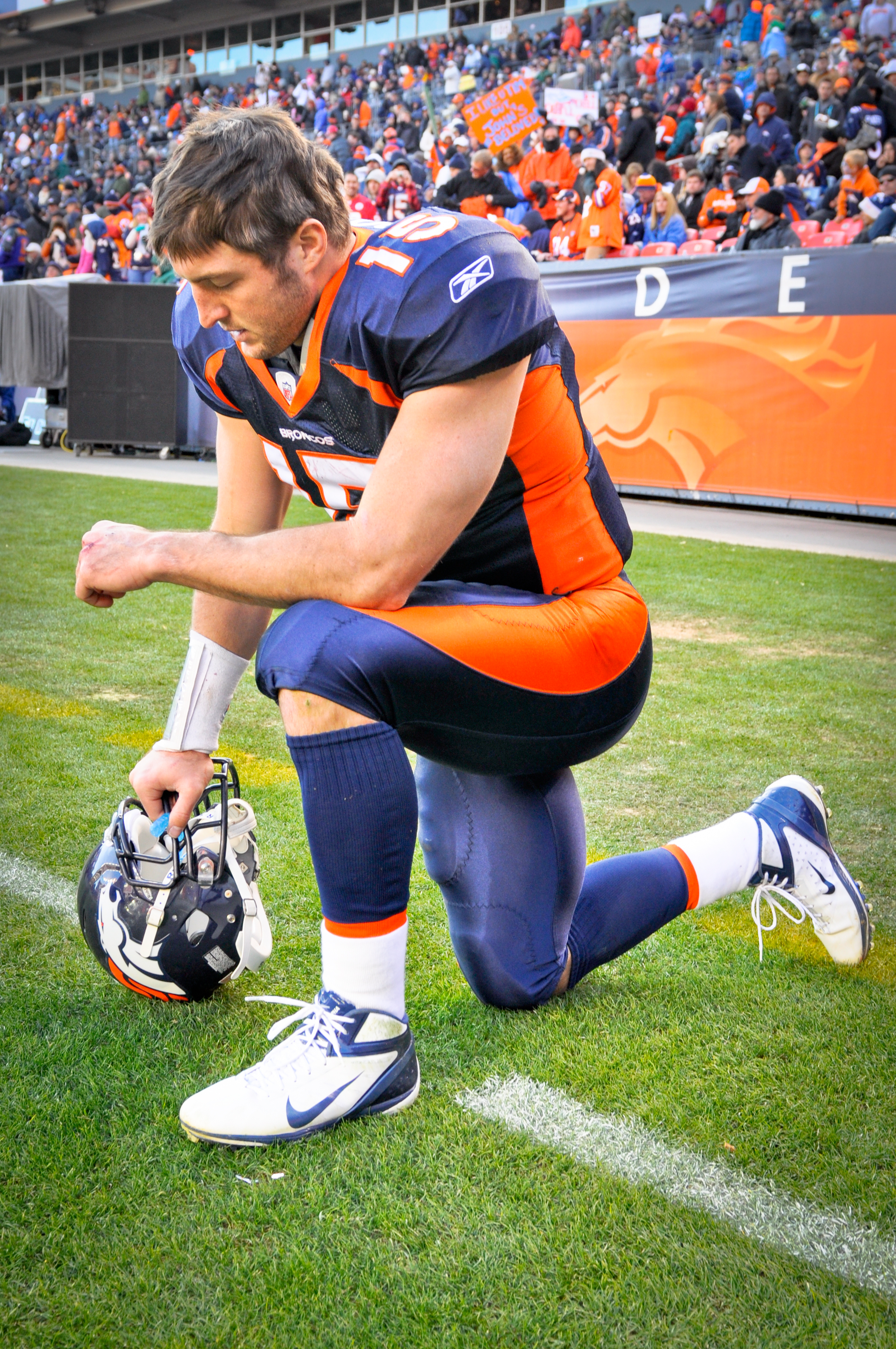
Tim Tebow: The GMC Never Say Never Moment winner

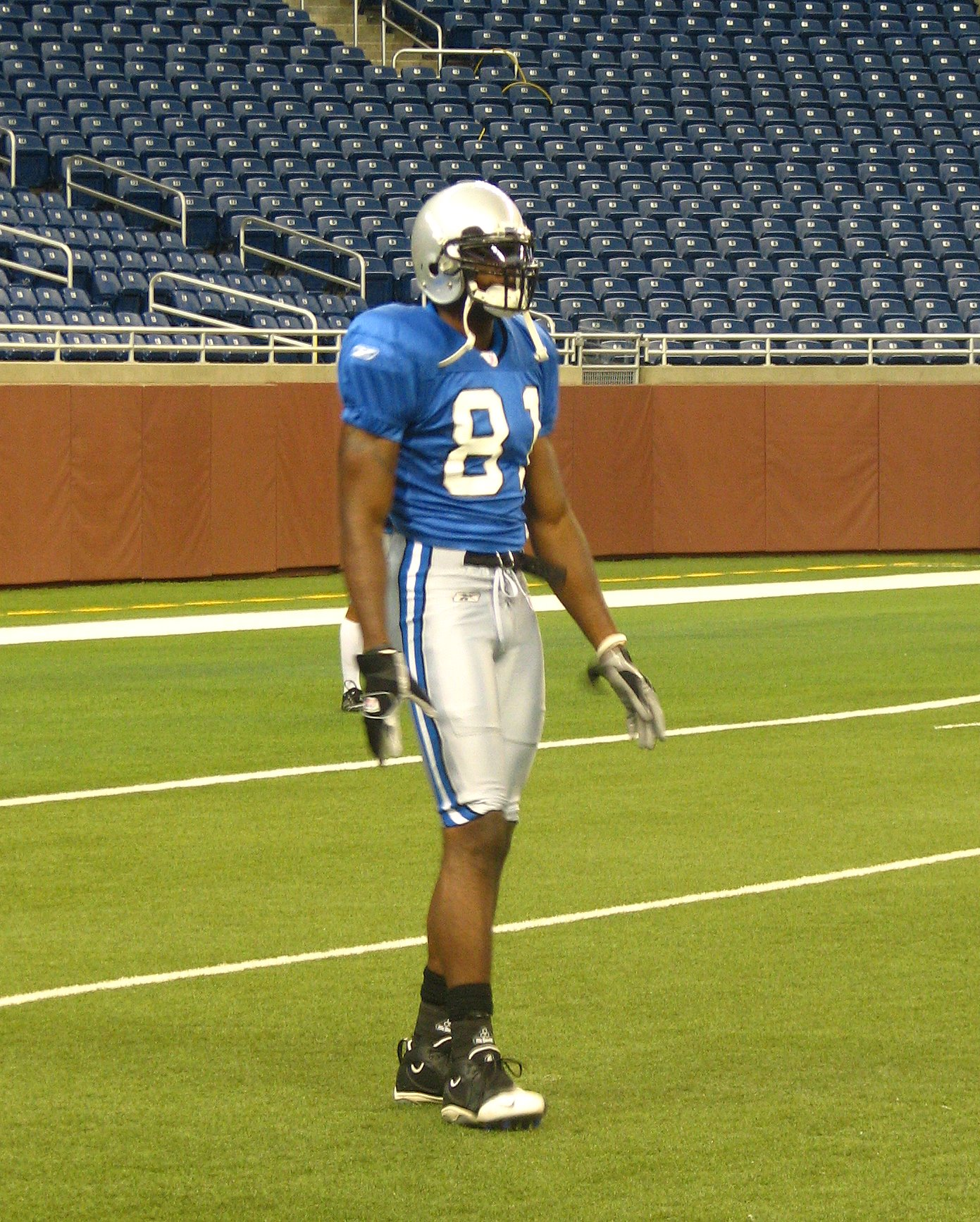
Calvin Johnson: The NFL.com Fantasy Player

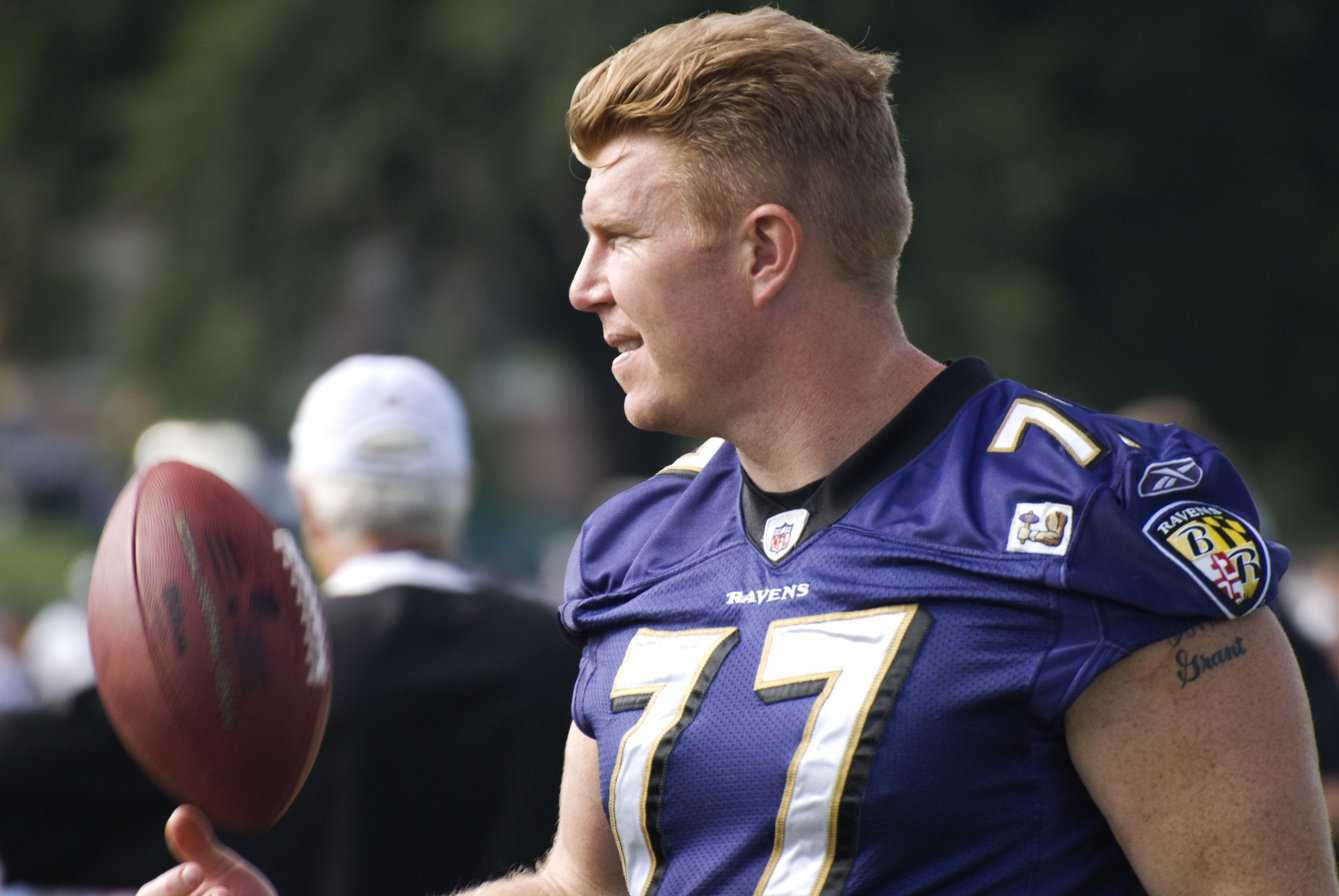
Matt Birk: The Walter Payton Man of the Year
