= Hail Maryland =

2024 Hail Mary play

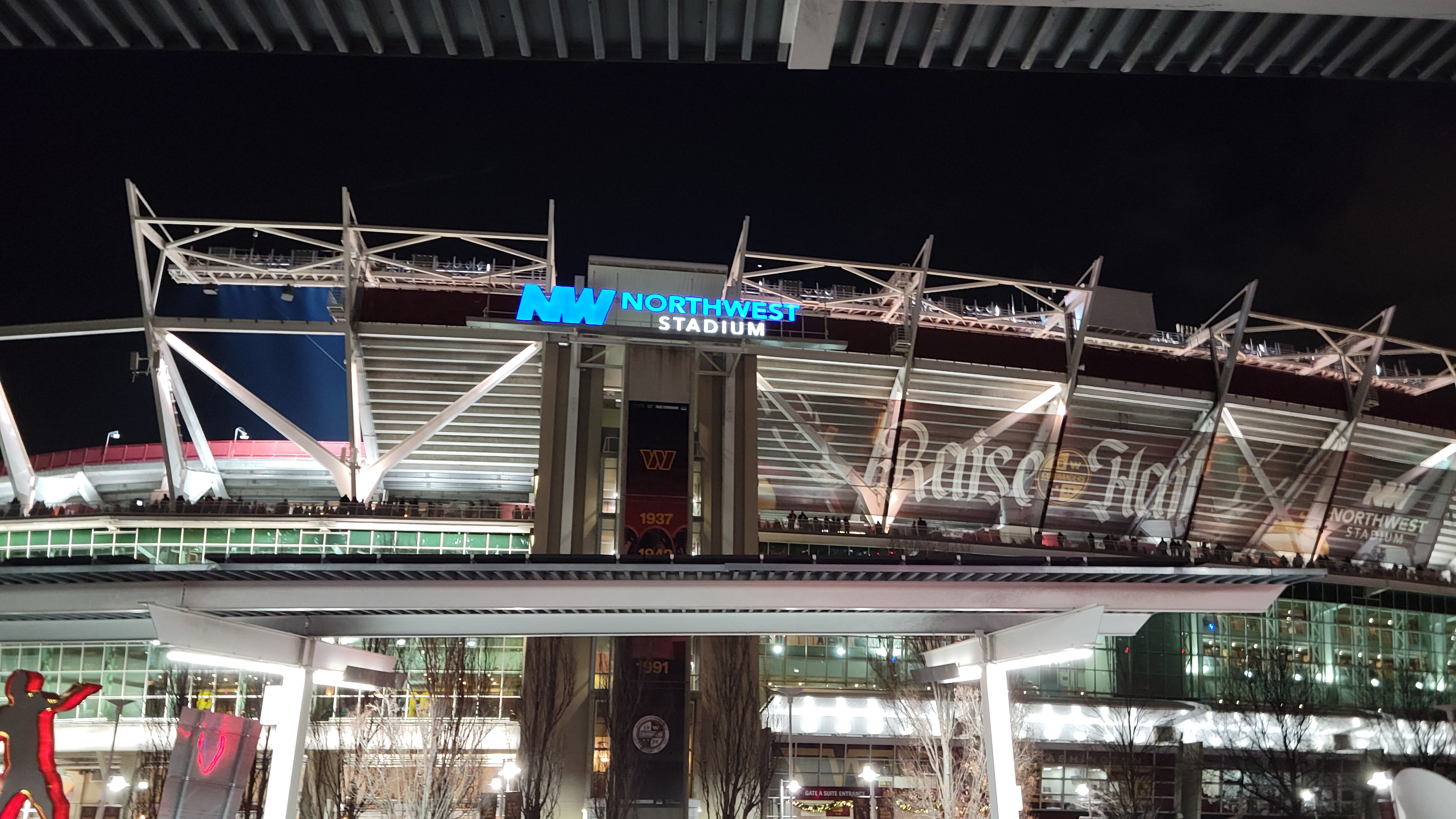
- Northwest Stadium, the site of the game
Chicago Bears (4–2)	Washington Commanders (5–2)
15	18
Head coach: Matt Eberflus	Head coach: Dan Quinn
	1	2	3	4	Total
CHI	0	0	7	8	15
WAS	6	3	3	6	18
- Date: October 27, 2024
- Kickoff time: 4:25 pm EDT (UTC-4)
- Stadium: Northwest Stadium; Landover, Maryland, U.S.
- Favorite: Commanders by 1
- Referee: Clete Blakeman
- Attendance: 64,704

TV in the United States
- Network: CBS
- Announcers: Jim Nantz and Tony Romo

The Hail Maryland, also referred to as the Madhouse in Maryland and Miracle in Maryland, was an American football play that took place at the end of a National Football League (NFL) regular-season game between the Chicago Bears and Washington Commanders on October 27, 2024. As time expired, Commanders rookie quarterback Jayden Daniels threw a Hail Mary pass from his own 35-yard line that was tipped at the goal line by Bears cornerback Tyrique Stevenson amid a crowd of players and caught by Commanders wide receiver Noah Brown in the end zone to win the game 18–15.

It was the first successful Hail Mary in the final ten seconds of an NFL game since the Hail Murray play in 2020, with Daniels becoming the second rookie since 2006 to complete one. The game was the first meeting of quarterbacks Caleb Williams and Daniels, the 2022 and 2023 Heisman Trophy winners and the first and second overall selections in the 2024 NFL draft. The play was named the 2024 NFL Moment of the Year at the 14th NFL Honors.

== Background ==
Headed into the game, the Washington Commanders held a 5–2 record while the Chicago Bears were 4–2. Daniels entered the game with a rib injury he suffered the previous week against the Carolina Panthers, a game completed by backup quarterback Marcus Mariota. His playing status for the Bears game was not established until a few hours before kickoff. A storyline leading into the game was the matchup between the first two selections in the 2024 NFL draft. The game was flexed from the early to late afternoon timeslot, swapping with the Eagles-Bengals matchup. As such, it was the marquee match of the day.

The game opened with both teams trading punts. Washington kicker Austin Seibert then converted four field goals, including a 47-yarder in the third quarter to make the score 12–0. Bears running back D'Andre Swift then ran for a 56-yard touchdown, cutting the lead to 12–7. The fourth quarter began with a 51-yard field goal attempt by Seibert; it was blocked by Gervon Dexter. The Bears reached the 1-yard line, where a fumbled handoff by Williams to backup offensive lineman Doug Kramer Jr. was recovered by Commanders defensive tackle Johnny Newton at the goal line. With 23 seconds remaining, Bears running back Roschon Johnson scored a 1-yard touchdown, giving Chicago their first lead of the game. A two-point conversion extended the lead, to 15–12. According to ESPN, the Bears had a 97.9% chance to win following the score.

=== The play ===
With two seconds remaining, Daniels scrambled to avoid Bears defenders for nearly 13 seconds before throwing a Hail Mary pass from the Commanders' own 35-yard line. The ball travelled into a crowd of players at the goal line and was tipped by Bears cornerback Tyrique Stevenson. Commanders wide receiver Noah Brown caught it behind Stevenson in the end zone, giving the Commanders an 18–15 victory. Stevenson was taunting the crowd before the play and had his back turned for a few seconds after it had started.

Game summary

Quarter	1	2	3	4	Total
Bears	0	0	7	8	15
Commanders	6	3	3	6	18

at Northwest Stadium (Landover, Maryland)

- Date: October 27, 2024
- Game time: 4:25 pm EDT / 3:25 pm CDT
- Game weather: Clear, 58 °F (14 °C)
- Game attendance: 64,704
- Referee: Clete Blakeman
- TV announcers (CBS): Jim Nantz, Tony Romo, and Tracy Wolfson
- Recap, Game Book

Game information

First quarter

- WAS – Austin Seibert 27-yard field goal, 8:51. Commanders 3–0. Drive: 9 plays, 56 yards, 4:12.
- WAS – Austin Seibert 30-yard field goal, 1:04. Commanders 6–0. Drive: 12 plays, 79 yards, 4:59.

Second quarter

- WAS – Austin Seibert 28-yard field goal, 5:24. Commanders 9–0. Drive: 7 plays, 31 yards, 3:01.

Third quarter

- WAS – Austin Seibert 47-yard field goal, 5:48. Commanders 12–0. Drive: 7 plays, 12 yards, 3:50.
- CHI – D'Andre Swift 56-yard run (Cairo Santos kick), 0:43. Commanders 12–7. Drive: 2 plays, 59 yards, 0:46.

Fourth quarter

- CHI – Roschon Johnson 1-yard run (2-pt conversion good by Cole Kmet), 0:23. Bears 15–12. Drive: 10 plays, 62 yards, 3:56.
- WAS – Noah Brown 52-yard pass from Jayden Daniels, 0:00. Commanders 18–15. Drive: 4 plays, 76 yards, 0:25.

Top passers

- CHI – Caleb Williams – 10/24, 131 yards
- WAS – Jayden Daniels – 21/38, 326 yards, TD

Top rushers

- CHI – D'Andre Swift – 18 rushes, 129 yards, TD
- WAS – Brian Robinson Jr. – 16 rushes, 65 yards

Top receivers

- CHI – Rome Odunze – 3 receptions, 41 yards
- WAS – Terry McLaurin – 5 receptions, 125 yards

== Broadcast calls ==
=== Television (CBS) ===
Jim Nantz, who called the play for CBS:

Comes down to one last play and it's gonna be getting longer by the second. You're all the way back at the 30-yard-line. Now you can step into it. Here comes the Hail Mary with the game on the line. And the ball is caught! Caught! It's a miracle! It's Noah Brown! Oh my goodness! This town is going crazy! It's a madhouse in Landover, Maryland!

=== Radio ===
==== Washington ====
Commanders play-by-play announcer Bram Weinstein called the play for the Commanders' radio broadcast:

Bears have eight deep, four of them at the goal line. They bring three. Daniels backing up — he's just going to have to let one fly. Goes to the right side, steps away from the defenders, gives himself some time. Now steps up, fires, heads toward the end zone, it is — Caught! Touchdown! Touchdown Washington!

Washington Post writer Scott Allen described the narration by Weinstein and analysts Logan Paulsen and London Fletcher following the play as "Screaming and laughter and indecipherable commentary".

==== Chicago ====
Bears play-by-play announcer Jeff Joniak called the play for the Bears' radio broadcast:

Jayden Daniels shifting back, being pressured, Jayden Daniels, being hemmed into the pocket, looking for blockers, looking for something. He's got plenty of time. Launches, deep pass, into the area, the end zone, tipped and it's caught by Noah Brown. He was the tip man, and now this place has gone into bedlam mode. Washington, with the miracle finish. The break-up pass, into the waiting arms of Noah Brown, nobody back there. Crushing loss.

== Significance ==
With the win, the Commanders improved to 6–2 while the Bears fell to 4–3 and into last place in the NFC North standings. The game gave the Commanders their best start to a season since 2008, when they were known as the Washington Redskins. The play propelled the team to finish 12–5, their best season since 1991 when they won Super Bowl XXVI, and advanced to the NFC Championship Game, where they fell to their division rival Philadelphia. Daniels became the second rookie to throw a successful Hail Mary since 2006, when ESPN began to track the play. It was the first touchdown play longer than 10 seconds since first being tracked by Next Gen Stats in 2016.

In the post-game interview, Bears head coach Matt Eberflus stated:

"We had those plays at the end, and it comes down to that last play. We've practiced that play a hundred times since we've been here," he said. "I have to look at what the execution was on that. We have a body on a body, boxing guys out like basketball at the very end. We have one guy that's the 'rim,' that knocks the ball down. We've got a back-tip guy that goes behind the pile. I've got to look at it, detail it out and make sure we're better next time."

Daniels, speaking after the game, stated that he did not see Brown catch the pass and found out only after the crowd's reaction and the Commanders' sideline rushing the field. Washington offensive lineman Sam Cosmi described the play as "like a movie", while Brown stated that he felt "blessed" to have Daniels as his quarterback and that he would not want to play with any other. Washington Post writer Scott Allen deemed the play the greatest in Northwest Stadium history and Chicago Tribune writer Dan Wiederer described the play as having "Double Doink shock value". Following the season, the play won the 2024 NFL Moment of the Year award at the 14th NFL Honors.

Meanwhile, the Bears would continue to go in a different direction. They would miss the playoffs and have a devastating collapse, not winning a single game until the final week of the regular season against the Packers. The conduct of Bears cornerback Tyrique Stevenson, who was observed taunting Commanders fans for several seconds before and during the start of the play, was criticized. Stevenson later apologized, stating that he "let the moment get too big". Many also criticized the Bears' play calls such as the attempted hand-off to backup offensive lineman Doug Kramer Jr. that resulted in a lost fumble at Washington's one-yard line earlier in the 4th quarter.

According to the Redskins Rule, the Commanders' win would traditionally have indicated a win for Kamala Harris of the incumbent Democratic party in the 2024 United States presidential election. However, Republican nominee Donald Trump won the electoral and popular votes.

The following year, the Bears and Commanders met again at Northwest Stadium, with the Bears winning 25–24.
