= NFL Honors =

Annual awards presentation by the National Football League

- Country: United States
- Presented by: National Football League
- First award: 2011
- Website: www.nfl.com/honors/

The NFL Honors is an annual awards presentation in the National Football League (NFL). From 2012 to 2021 and beginning in 2027, it will be held on the day before the Super Bowl. From 2022 to 2026, the ceremony has been held on the Thursday before the Super Bowl in the game's host city. The presentation was pre-recorded for same-day broadcast from 2012 to 2020.

== Categories and awards ==
=== Associated Press (AP) ===
- Most Valuable Player (MVP)
- Offensive Player of the Year (OPOY)
- Defensive Player of the Year (DPOY)
- Offensive Rookie of the Year (OROY)
- Defensive Rookie of the Year (DROY)
- Comeback Player of the Year (CPOY)
- Coach of the Year (COTY)
- Assistant Coach of the Year (ACOY)

=== Other ===
- Walter Payton NFL Man of the Year
- Moment of the Year
- NFL Protector of the Year
- Salute to Service award
- Art Rooney Award
- Deacon Jones Award
- Jim Brown Award
- Don Shula NFL High School Coach of the Year

=== Former ===
- Madden Most Valuable Protectors award (2011–2012)
- Greatness on the Road award (2011–2017)
- Built Ford Tough Offensive Line of the Year (2016–2018)
- NFL Fan of the Year (2020-2025)

== List of ceremonies ==
List of NFL Honors
| Ceremony | Date | MVP winner | Network* | Host | Venue | Ref |
|---|---|---|---|---|---|---|
| 1st | February 4, 2012 | Aaron Rodgers | NBC | Alec Baldwin | Murat Theatre (Indianapolis) | |
| 2nd | February 2, 2013 | Adrian Peterson | CBS | Alec Baldwin | Mahalia Jackson Theater (New Orleans) | |
| 3rd | February 1, 2014 | Peyton Manning | Fox | Alec Baldwin | Radio City Music Hall (New York City) | |
| 4th | January 31, 2015 | Aaron Rodgers | NBC | Seth Meyers | Phoenix Symphony Hall (Phoenix) | |
| 5th | February 6, 2016 | Cam Newton | CBS | Conan O'Brien | Bill Graham Civic Auditorium (San Francisco) | |
| 6th | February 4, 2017 | Matt Ryan | Fox | Keegan-Michael Key | Wortham Theater (Houston) | |
| 7th | February 3, 2018 | Tom Brady | NBC | Rob Riggle | Northrop Auditorium (Minneapolis) | |
| 8th | February 2, 2019 | Patrick Mahomes | CBS | Steve Harvey | Fox Theatre (Atlanta) | |
| 9th | February 1, 2020 | Lamar Jackson | Fox | Steve Harvey | Adrienne Arsht Center (Miami) | |
| 10th | February 6, 2021 | Aaron Rodgers | CBS | Steve Harvey | Straz Center (Tampa); SoFi Stadium (Inglewood) | |
| 11th | February 10, 2022 | Aaron Rodgers | ABC | Keegan-Michael Key | YouTube Theater (Inglewood) | |
| 12th | February 9, 2023 | Patrick Mahomes | NBC | Kelly Clarkson | Symphony Hall (Phoenix) | |
| 13th | February 8, 2024 | Lamar Jackson | CBS | Keegan-Michael Key | Resorts World Theatre (Las Vegas) | |
| 14th | February 6, 2025 | Josh Allen | Fox | Snoop Dogg | Saenger Theater (New Orleans) | |
| 15th | February 5, 2026 | Matthew Stafford | NBC | Jon Hamm | Palace of Fine Arts (San Francisco) | |
| 16th | February 13, 2027 | TBD | Netflix | TBD | TBA (Los Angeles) | |

- Between the 11th and 15th NFL Honors, NFL Network (and since the 13th NFL Honors streams on NFL+) aired the ceremony annually and was also streamed on the respective broadcaster's streaming service in the list below:
  - Peacock for the 12th and 15th NFL Honors for NBC.
  - ESPN+ for the 11th NFL Honors for ABC.
  - CBS All Access (for the 5th, 8th and 10th NFL Honors)/ Paramount+ (for the 13th NFL Honors) for CBS.
- Netflix will be the exclusive broadcaster for the 16th, 17th, 18th, and 19th NFL Honors as part of a 4-year deal.
