= Next Gen Stats =

Statistics program by the NFL

The logo for Next Gen Stats

Next Generation Stats, or simply Next Gen Stats (NGS), refers to data collected by the National Football League (NFL) and the advanced statistics drawn from that data. Going beyond the standard statistics recorded in NFL games (such as passing yards, rushing touchdowns, or interceptions), NGS data instead focuses on advanced statistics, with raw data collected being used to "automate player participation reports, calculate performance metrics, and derive advanced statistics".

== History ==
The 2011 NFL collective bargaining agreement saw players agree to having their on-field location and health metrics tracked. Next Gen Stats was developed by the NFL in partnership with Zebra Technologies and Wilson Sporting Goods. The former is the NFL's official player tracking partner, with the partnership beginning in 2014. NGS data collection runs on Amazon Web Services (AWS) infrastructure, as well. NGS are recorded using sensors worn by players during each game. An example of raw data collected by NGS includes a wide receiver's real-time speed, acceleration, and route paths are tracked by Next Gen.

Zebra described 2014 as a "best effort" year, with that season seeing the introduction of location beacons embedded in each player's shoulder pads, as well as referees and first down measuring sticks also being equipped with radio-frequency identification (RFID) tags. Zebra's MotionWorks RFID system was installed in 18 NFL stadiums during the 2014 season to track vector data. At the time, there was a half-second latency and a margin of error of less than six inches; the ball was noted by The Verge as the only "untracked entity on the field". They worked on a custom transmitter with a wider weight distribution. Eventually, every NFL venue had a tracker system installed, composed of: "20–30 ultra-wide band receivers, 2–3 radio-frequency identification (RFID) tags installed into the players' shoulder pads, and RFID tags on officials, pylons, sticks, chains, and in the ball".

In 2015, Microsoft included "Next Gen Replay" as a feature on its NFL mobile app for the Xbox One and Windows 10 devices. NFL.com writers have referred to seasons since 2016 as the "Next Gen era".

NGS developed a new passing metric in 2022, aimed to convey a passer's contributions better than similar metrics such as passer rating. Machine learning tools are used as part of AWS' role in NGS data collection, helping generate new metrics, such as the 2024 introductions of the "Tackle Probability" and "Offensive Shift and Motion Classification" stats.

The NFL's broadcast partners, of which Amazon Prime Video is one, utilize and reference Next Gen Stats in their broadcasts. CBS, for example, has used Next Gen Stats in their "RomoVision" visuals on NFL on CBS broadcasts. NGS data has been cited by sports media outlets such as ESPN, Fox Sports, and Sports Illustrated, among others. Next Gen Stats were also included in the Madden NFL 21 video game.

== Statistics tracked ==
The following statistics are tracked by NGS:

Passing

- Time To Throw (TT)
- Average Completed Air Yards (CAY) and Average Intended Air Yards (IAY)
- Average Air Yards Differential (AYD)
- Longest Completed Air Distance (LCAD)
- Aggressiveness (AGG%)
- Air Yards to the Sticks (AYTS)
- Completion Probability
- Expected Completion Percentage (xCOMP)
- Completion Percentage Above Expectation (+/-) (Note: Also called Completion Percentage Over Expectation (or CPOE).)

Rushing

- Efficiency (EFF)
- 8+ Defenders in the Box (8+D%)
- Avg Time Behind Line Of Scrimmage (TLOS)

Receiving

- Average Cushion (CUSH)
- Average Separation (SEP)
- Average Targeted Air Yards (TAY)
- % Share of Team's Air Yards (TAY%)
- Yards After Catch (YAC)
- Expected Yards After Catch (xYAC)
- YAC Above Expectation (+/-)

Top Plays

- Fastest Ball Carriers
- Longest Plays (Ball Carriers)
- Fastest Sacks
- Longest Tackles

Other

- Tackle Probability
- Offensive Shift and Motion Classification
