= Bart Starr Award =

National Football League player award

Athletes in Action/Bart Starr Award
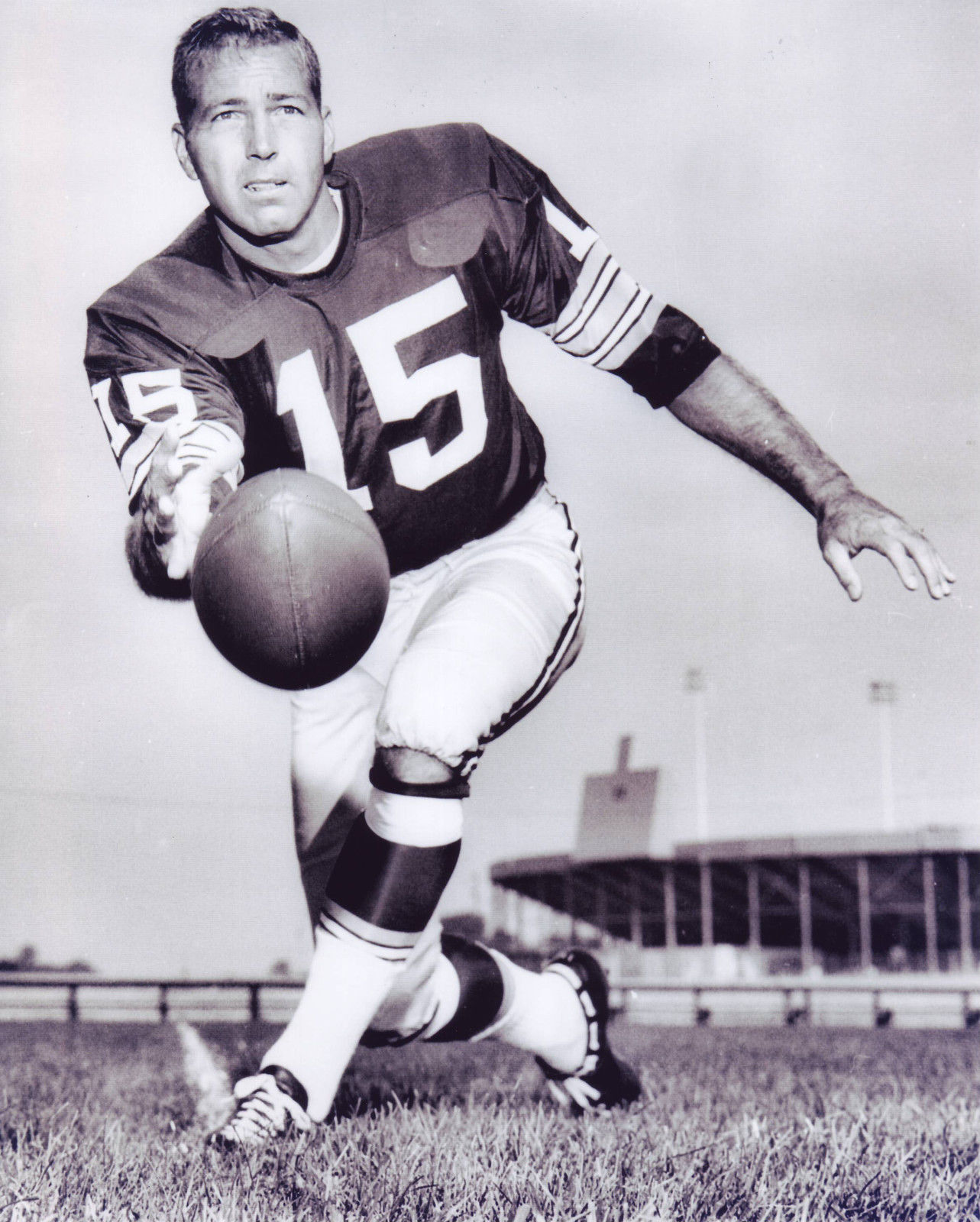
- Bart Starr, former quarterback of the Green Bay Packers and namesake of the award
- League: National Football League
- Awarded for: Outstanding character and leadership
- Nickname: Bart Starr Award
- Sponsored by: Athletes in Action

History
- First award: Steve Largent, WR, 1989
- Most recent: Christian McCaffrey, RB, 2026
- Website: superbowlbreakfast.com/winners/

The Athletes in Action/Bart Starr Award is given annually to an American football player in the National Football League (NFL) who "best exemplifies outstanding character and leadership in the home, on the field, and in the community". The award is presented by Athletes in Action (AIA), a sports ministry associated with Cru (formerly known as Campus Crusade for Christ). It is awarded to the winner each year at the Super Bowl Breakfast, an NFL-sanctioned event that occurs the day before the Super Bowl. The nominee list is compiled by a group of individuals made-up of the Public Relations Directors of every NFL team, past award winners and AIA staff. The list is trimmed to 10 players, with the award winner chosen by AIA leadership and past award winners. However, some past awardees have been chosen by fellow NFL players after the initial list is trimmed down to 10. The award was first given at the second Super Bowl Breakfast in 1989. Bart Starr, the Hall of Fame former quarterback of the Green Bay Packers, partnered with AIA to present the award that bears his name. Starr was selected by AIA because he was an "individual of impeccable character who has served his family and community faithfully through the years and is a role model for athletes and business people alike". Starr presented every award until 2015, when a stroke prevented him from attending the Super Bowl Breakfast anymore. Since 2015, former NFL coach Tony Dungy and Starr's son have presented the award in his honor.

Steve Largent, the Hall of Fame former wide receiver for the Seattle Seahawks, was the winner of the inaugural award in 1989. Since then, 37 NFL players have received the award. This includes Eugene Robinson, a safety for the Atlanta Falcons, who returned the award after being arrested the night he received it for soliciting sex from an undercover police officer. Historically, the award has only been given to one player a year, however in 1998, Irving Fryar and Brent Jones shared the award. The award has been given to one set of brothers (Peyton and Eli Manning in 2015 and 2019 respectively) and one father and son (Jackie and Matthew Slater in 1996 and 2017 respectively). The most recent awardee was Christian McCaffrey, running back for the San Francisco 49ers, in 2026.

== Award winners ==
Bart Starr Award winners
| Year^{[a]} | Image | Player | Position | Team | Refs |
|---|---|---|---|---|---|
| 1989 | Headshot of Steve Largent | Steve Largent | Wide receiver | Seattle Seahawks | |
| 1990 | Headshot of Anthony Munoz holding a microphone | Anthony Muñoz | Offensive tackle | Cincinnati Bengals | |
| 1991 | Headshot of Mike Singletary in front of a microphone | Mike Singletary | Linebacker | Chicago Bears | |
| 1992 | Photo of the back of Reggie White sitting on the sideline in his uniform with no helmet | Reggie White | Defensive end | Philadelphia Eagles | |
| 1993 | Headshot of Byrd wearing a helmet | Gill Byrd | Cornerback | San Diego Chargers | |
| 1994 | Headshot of Warren Moon smiling | Warren Moon | Quarterback | Houston Oilers | |
| 1995 | Headshot of Chris Carter | Cris Carter | Wide receiver | Minnesota Vikings | |
| 1996 | Headshot of Jackie Slater | Jackie Slater | Offensive tackle | St. Louis Rams | |
| 1997 | Headshot of Darrell Green | Darrell Green | Cornerback | Washington Redskins | |
| 1998 | Headshot of Irving Fryar holding a microphone | Irving Fryar | Wide receiver | Philadelphia Eagles | |
| 1998 | | Brent Jones | Tight end | San Francisco 49ers | |
| 1999 | | Eugene Robinson^{[b]} | Safety | Atlanta Falcons | |
| 2000 | Headshot of Aeneas Williams on a football field wearing his uniform but no helmet | Aeneas Williams | Cornerback | Arizona Cardinals | |
| 2001 | Headshot of Bruce Matthews on a football field wearing his uniform but no helmet | Bruce Matthews | Offensive tackle | Tennessee Titans | |
| 2002 | Headshot of Darren Woodson | Darren Woodson | Safety | Dallas Cowboys | |
| 2003 | Photo of Trent Dilfer during a game about to hand the football off to a teammate | Trent Dilfer | Quarterback | Seattle Seahawks | |
| 2004 | Photo of the side of Derrick Brooks in uniform speaking towards a microphone | Derrick Brooks | Linebacker | Tampa Bay Buccaneers | |
| 2005 | Headshot of Troy Vincent in a suit | Troy Vincent | Cornerback | Buffalo Bills | |
| 2006 | Headshot of Curtis Martin waving to a crowd | Curtis Martin | Running back | New York Jets | |
| 2007 | Headshot of John Lynch | John Lynch | Safety | Denver Broncos | |
| 2008 | Headshot of LaDainian Tomlinson wearing a suit | LaDainian Tomlinson | Running back | San Diego Chargers | |
| 2009 | Headshot of Warrick Dunn sitting and signing autographs | Warrick Dunn | Running back | Tampa Bay Buccaneers | |
| 2010 | Headshot of Kurt Warner | Kurt Warner | Quarterback | Arizona Cardinals | |
| 2011 | Headshot of Drew Brees in full uniform and helmet on a football field | Drew Brees | Quarterback | New Orleans Saints | |
| 2012 | Headshot of London Fletcher wearing his uniform but no helmet | London Fletcher | Linebacker | Washington Redskins | |
| 2013 | Headshot of Jason Witten on a football field in uniform with his helmet resting on top of his head | Jason Witten | Tight end | Dallas Cowboys | |
| 2014 | Headshot of Aaron Rodgers in full uniform and helmet smiling | Aaron Rodgers | Quarterback | Green Bay Packers | |
| 2015 | Headshot of Peyton Manning wearing a suit | Peyton Manning | Quarterback | Denver Broncos | |
| 2016 | Headshot of Thomas Davis in uniform but no helmet | Thomas Davis Sr. | Linebacker | Carolina Panthers | |
| 2017 | Headshot of Matthew Slater in uniform but no helmet | Matthew Slater | Wide receiver | New England Patriots | |
| 2018 | Headshot of Benjamin Watson in full uniform and helmet | Benjamin Watson | Tight end | Baltimore Ravens | |
| 2019 | Headshot of Calais Campbell wearing a suit and smiling | Calais Campbell | Defensive end | Jacksonville Jaguars | |
| 2020 | Headshot of Eli Manning smilining, in uniform and wearing a New York Giants hat | Eli Manning | Quarterback | New York Giants | |
| 2021 | Headshot of Demario Davis wearing his uniform and helmet | Demario Davis | Linebacker | New Orleans Saints | |
| 2022 | Headshot of Russell Wilson in uniform and helmet running with the football | Russell Wilson | Quarterback | Seattle Seahawks | |
| 2023 | Headshot of Kirk Cousins wearing his uniform and a Minnesota Vikings hat | Kirk Cousins | Quarterback | Minnesota Vikings | |
| 2024 | Headshot of Fitzpatrick in a black sweater smiling at the camera | Minkah Fitzpatrick | Safety | Pittsburgh Steelers | |
| 2025 | Headshot of Jordan in his uniform | Cameron Jordan | Defensive end | New Orleans Saints | |
| 2026 | Headshot of McCaffrey wearing a black shirt | Christian McCaffrey | Running back | San Francisco 49ers | |

== Notes ==
- ^{a} Winners are listed by the year the award was given, not by the season the player had just completed.
- ^{b} Atlanta Falcons safety Eugene Robinson won the award for the 1998 NFL season, but was arrested the evening he received the award in Miami, Florida, for soliciting a female undercover police officer who was posing as a prostitute. This occurred on the eve of the Falcons' game against the Denver Broncos in Super Bowl XXXIII. Robinson later agreed to return the award. He is no longer listed on the AIA's list of award winners.

== See also ==
- List of NFL awards
  - Walter Payton NFL Man of the Year
  - Alan Page Community Award
  - Art Rooney Award
