= AP NFL Assistant Coach of the Year =

American football award given by the Associated Press

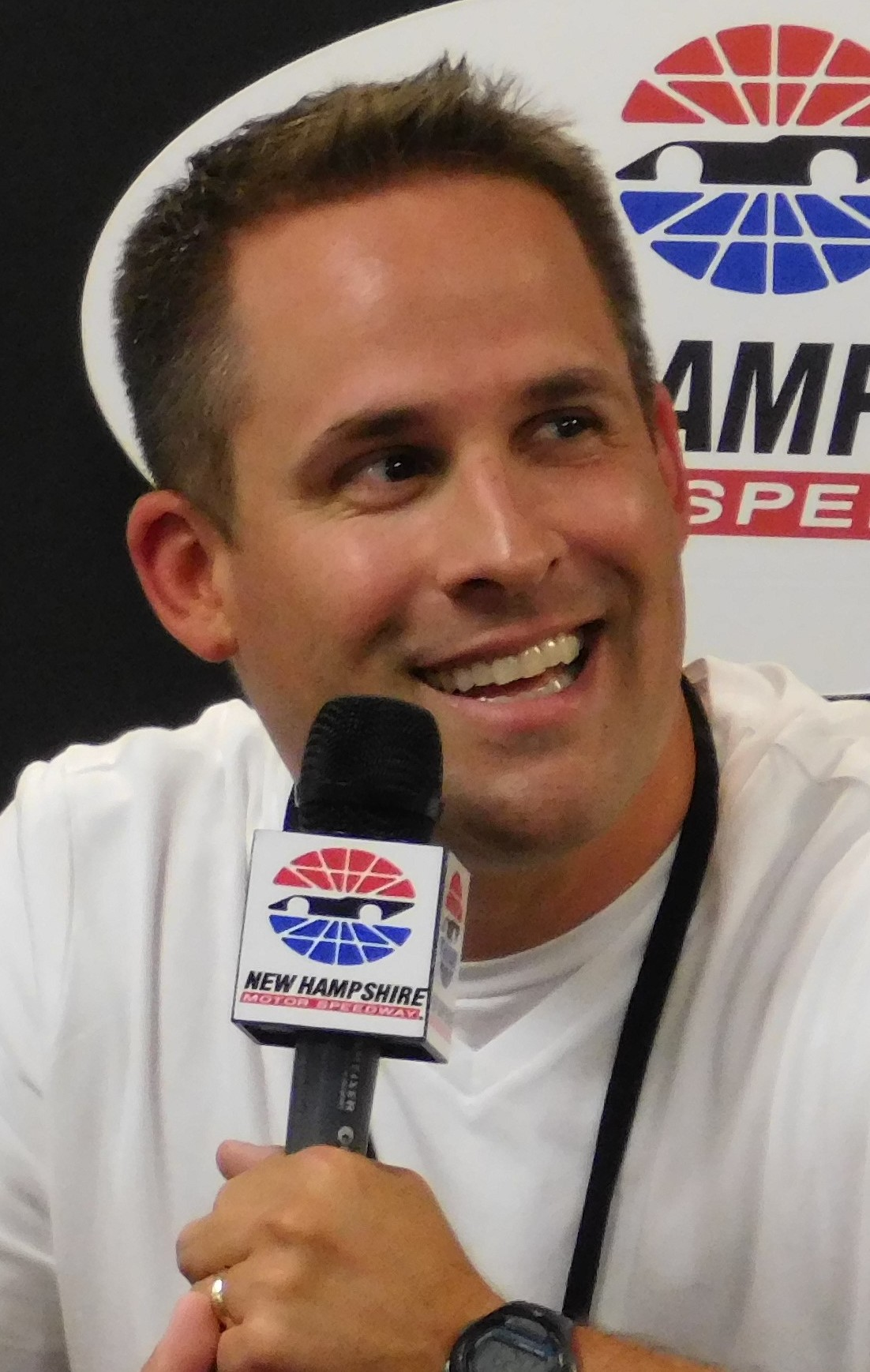
- Josh McDaniels, 2025 recipient
- Awarded for: Assistant coach of the year in the National Football League
- Presented by: Associated Press

History
- First award: 2014
- Most recent: Josh McDaniels

The AP NFL Assistant Coach of the Year (ACOY) is an annual award presented by the Associated Press (AP) to the top assistant coach in the National Football League (NFL). The winner is decided by votes from a nationwide panel of sportswriters who regularly report on the NFL. The ACOY is presented alongside seven other AP awards at the NFL Honors and was first awarded following the 2014 season at the 4th NFL Honors. It is the first new NFL award presented by the AP since the Comeback Player of the Year award was re-introduced in 1998. Though all coaches aside from head coaches are eligible, it has only been awarded to offensive or defensive coordinators so far.

Todd Bowles was the inaugural winner of the award and, following his award-winning season, was hired as the head coach of the New York Jets. Five other coaches—Vic Fangio, Ben Johnson, DeMeco Ryans, Kyle Shanahan, and Pat Shurmur—were hired to head coaching positions following the seasons for which they won the award. Two coaches—Brian Daboll and Dan Quinn—remained assistant coaches for at least another season after winning the award but were subsequently hired as head coaches. Daboll is the only person to have been named both the AP NFL Coach of the Year and ACOY. Josh McDaniels, the offensive coordinator for the 2025 New England Patriots, is the most recent winner of the award.

== Winners ==
Legend
*	Denotes team won the Super Bowl that season

List of AP NFL Assistant Coach of the Year winners
Season	Coach	Position	Team	Ref.
2014	Todd Bowles	Defensive coordinator	Arizona Cardinals	
2015	Wade Phillips	Defensive coordinator	Denver Broncos*	
2016	Kyle Shanahan	Offensive coordinator	Atlanta Falcons	
2017	Pat Shurmur	Offensive coordinator	Minnesota Vikings	
2018	Vic Fangio	Defensive coordinator	Chicago Bears	
2019	Greg Roman	Offensive coordinator	Baltimore Ravens	
2020	Brian Daboll	Offensive coordinator	Buffalo Bills	
2021	Dan Quinn	Defensive coordinator	Dallas Cowboys	
2022	DeMeco Ryans	Defensive coordinator	San Francisco 49ers	
2023	Jim Schwartz	Defensive coordinator	Cleveland Browns	
2024	Ben Johnson	Offensive coordinator	Detroit Lions	
2025	Josh McDaniels	Offensive coordinator	New England Patriots	
