= Art Rooney Award =

Annual NFL award

- Awarded for: Outstanding sportsmanship on the playing field
- Presented by: NFL Honors

History
- First award: Larry Fitzgerald, 2014
- Most recent: Budda Baker, 2025

The Art Rooney Award is given annually by the National Football League (NFL) in recognition of outstanding sportsmanship on the playing field. Established in 2015, the award is named in honor of Art Rooney, the founding owner of the Pittsburgh Steelers and a member of the Pro Football Hall of Fame.

The award is determined by a vote of the NFL players. The award is presented each year to an NFL player who demonstrates on the field the qualities of great sportsmanship, including fair play, respect for opponents, and integrity in competition.

Each NFL team nominates one player during the season. A panel of former players from the NFL Legends Community selected from the 32 nominees eight finalists (four in the American Football Conference; four in the National Football Conference). The panel of Legends Coordinators in the inaugural year was composed of Warrick Dunn, Curtis Martin, Karl Mecklenburg and Leonard Wheeler. Along with the award, the winner receives a $25,000 donation from the NFL Foundation to a charity of his choice.

== Winners ==
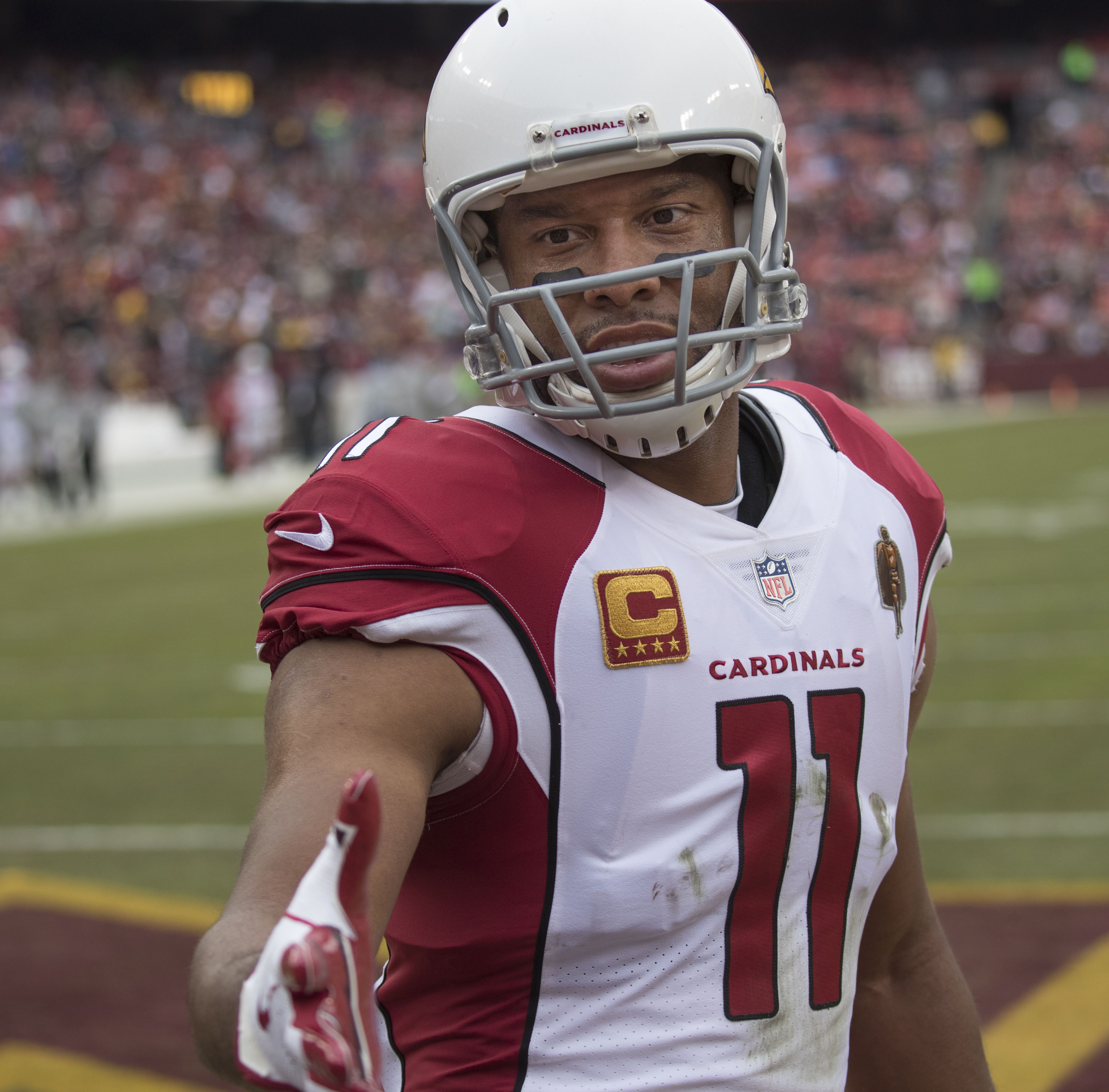
Larry Fitzgerald, the inaugural recipient of the award

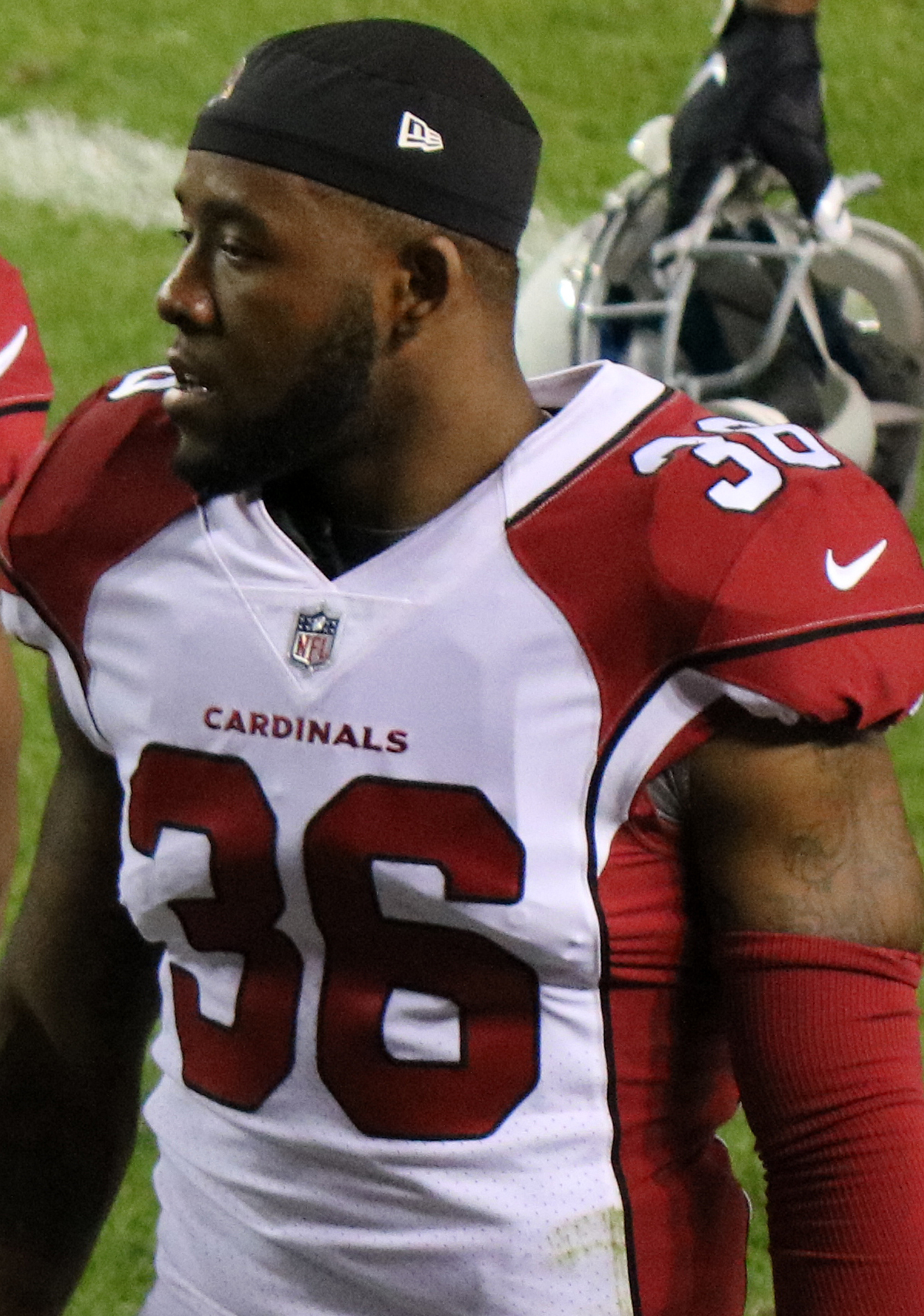
Budda Baker, the most recent recipient of the award

List of Art Rooney Award winners
Year	Player	Position	Team	Ref
2014	Larry Fitzgerald	Wide receiver	Arizona Cardinals	
2015	Charles Woodson	Safety	Oakland Raiders	
2016	Frank Gore	Running back	Indianapolis Colts	
2017	Luke Kuechly	Linebacker	Carolina Panthers	
2018	Drew Brees	Quarterback	New Orleans Saints	
2019	Adrian Peterson	Running back	Washington Redskins	
2020	Teddy Bridgewater	Quarterback	Carolina Panthers	
2021	Matthew Slater	Special teamer	New England Patriots	
2022	Calais Campbell	Defensive end	Baltimore Ravens	
2023	Bobby Wagner	Linebacker	Seattle Seahawks	
2024	Josh Allen	Quarterback	Buffalo Bills	
2025	Budda Baker	Safety	Arizona Cardinals	

== See also ==
- List of NFL awards
