= NFL Moment of the Year =

National Football League award

NFL Moment of the Year award
- Country: United States
- Presented by: National Football League
- First award: 2011
- Currently held by: Caleb Williams and D. J. Moore

The NFL Moment of the Year award, officially presented as the Next Gen Stats Moment of the Year powered by AWS and formerly as the Bridgestone Play of the Year, is an annual National Football League award honoring the top moment or play of the season. It was first awarded at the inaugural NFL Honors ceremony in 2011.

== Winners ==
Year	Player(s)	Team	Play
2011	Randall Cobb	Green Bay	108-yard kickoff return touchdown vs. New Orleans
2012	Ray Rice	Baltimore	Short pass to convert on 4th & 29 vs. San Diego
2013	Calvin Johnson	Detroit	Leaping catch in the end zone in triple coverage vs. Cincinnati
2014	Odell Beckham Jr.	NY Giants	One-handed touchdown catch while falling backwards vs. Dallas
2015	Aaron Rodgers; Richard Rodgers	Green Bay	"Miracle in Motown": Game-winning Hail Mary pass as time expires vs. Detroit
2016	Mike Evans	Tampa Bay	One-handed catch where the ball was delivered high and behind. Evans caught the pass while being hit by a defender.
2017	Case Keenum; Stefon Diggs	Minnesota	"Minneapolis Miracle": Case Keenum threw a 61-yard touchdown pass to Stefon Diggs as time expired in the Divisional playoff game vs. New Orleans. It was the first game-winning touchdown on the final play of the fourth quarter in NFL postseason history.
2018	Ryan Tannehill; Kenny Stills; DeVante Parker; Kenyan Drake	Miami	"Miracle in Miami": Lateral play in which Ryan Tannehill threw to Kenny Stills, who lateraled the ball to DeVante Parker, who in turn lateraled the ball to Kenyan Drake, who ran the ball in for a touchdown as time expired in a game against New England. It was the first successful lateral touchdown since the River City Relay in 2003.
2019	Matt Haack; Jason Sanders	Miami	"Mountaineer Shot": Punter Matt Haack threw a touchdown to kicker Jason Sanders in a trick play on fourth down against Philadelphia. It was the first touchdown pass to a kicker since 1977.
2020	Kyler Murray; DeAndre Hopkins	Arizona	"Hail Murray": Kyler Murray threw a 43-yard Hail Mary pass into the end zone that was caught by DeAndre Hopkins over three defenders for the game-winning touchdown against Buffalo.
2021	Justin Tucker	Baltimore	Justin Tucker kicked a game-winning 66-yard field goal (at the time, the longest in NFL history) as time expired against Detroit.
2022	Justin Jefferson	Minnesota	Down four points to Buffalo in the last two minutes of regulation, Justin Jefferson's one-handed catch on 4th & 18 for 32 yards – wrestled from cornerback Cam Lewis – kept the game alive.
2023	CeeDee Lamb	Dallas	On 3rd & 13 at their own 8 yard line, Dak Prescott escaped a defender in the end-zone and heaved a 92-yard touchdown pass to CeeDee Lamb.
2024	Jayden Daniels; Noah Brown	Washington	"Hail Maryland": On the final play against Chicago, Daniels threw a Hail Mary pass from his own 35-yard line which was tipped by Bears cornerback Tyrique Stevenson at the goal line and caught by Brown.
2025	Caleb Williams; D. J. Moore	Chicago	In overtime against Green Bay, quarterback Caleb Williams threw a game-winning 46-yard touchdown pass to wide receiver D. J. Moore.
