= Salute to Service Award =

Annual professional football award

NFL Salute to Service Award
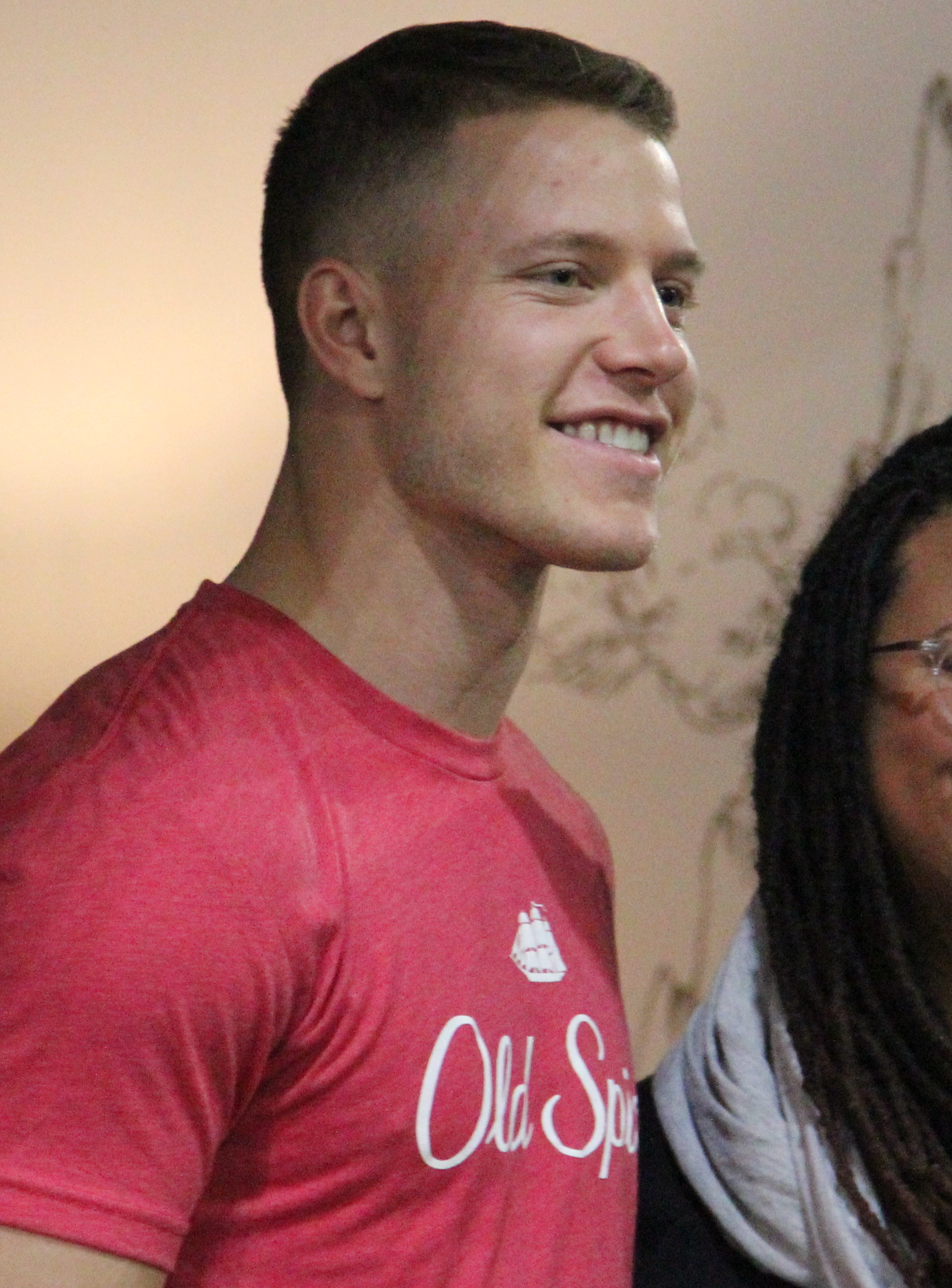
- Christian McCaffrey, the 2025 recipient
- Awarded for: Recognizes exceptional efforts by members of the NFL community to honor and support U.S. service members, veterans, and their families.
- Presented by: NFL & USAA

History
- First award: 2011
- Most recent: Christian McCaffrey

The Salute to Service Award is an annual award given presented by USAA at the NFL Honors. It is part of the NFL's larger Salute to Service initiative, which aims to honor, empower, and connect with U.S. service members, veterans, and their families. As of 2025, the campaign has raised over $75 million since its inception in 2011. The award aims to acknowledge members of the NFL community that honor and support U.S. service members, veterans, and their families with exceptional effort. The award is unique in that it can be awarded to any member of the NFL community, not just players and coaches.

== Winners ==
Year	Player	Position	Team	Ref
2011	Bud Adams	Owner	Tennessee	
2012	Charles Tillman	CB	Chicago	
2013	John Harbaugh	HC	Baltimore	
2014	Jared Allen	DE	Chicago	
2015	Vincent Jackson	WR	Tampa Bay	
2016	Dan Quinn	HC	Atlanta	
2017	Andre Roberts	WR	Atlanta	
2018	Ben Garland	G	Atlanta	
2019	Donnie Edwards	Legend	LA Chargers	
2020	Steve Cannon	CEO	Atlanta	
2021	Andrew Beck	TE/FB	Denver	
2022	Ron Rivera	HC	Washington	
2023	Joe Cardona	LS	New England	
2024	George Kittle	TE	San Francisco	
2025	Christian McCaffrey	RB	San Francisco	
