= NFL Top 100 Players of 2018 =

- Season 2018
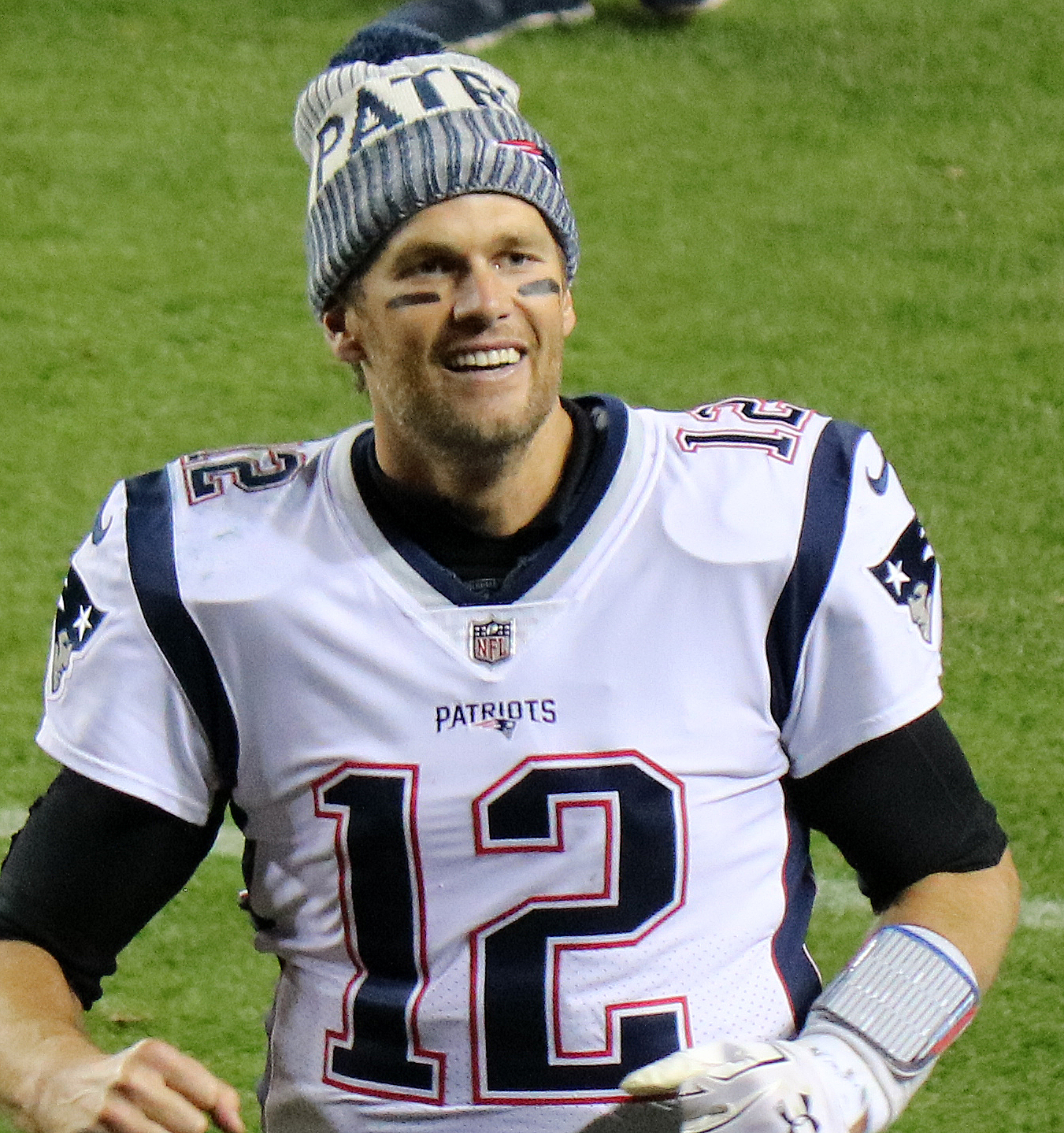
- Tom Brady, the #1 ranked player

Release
- Original network: NFL Network
- Original release: April 30 – June 25, 2018

Season chronology
- ← Previous; 2017 Next → 2019

The NFL Top 100 Players of 2018 was the eighth season in the NFL Top 100 series. It ended with reigning NFL MVP Tom Brady being ranked #1, making him the only player to be voted #1 three times, already being the only player to be voted first more than once. For the second time in the list's history, the Super Bowl MVP (Nick Foles) failed to rank.3 teams did not have a player on the list: Indianapolis Colts, New York Jets, Tampa Bay Buccaneers.

== Episode list ==
Episode No.	Air date	Numbers revealed
1	April 30	100–91
2	April 30	90–81
3	May 7	80–71
4	May 7	70–61
5	May 14	60–51
6	May 14	50–41
7	May 21	40–31
8	May 21	30–21
9	May 27	20–11
10	June 25	10–6
11	June 25	5–1
	June 25	110–101

== The list ==
Rank	Player	Position	2017 team	2018 team	Rank change	Reference	Year accomplishments
1	Tom Brady	Quarterback	New England Patriots		0	1	13th Pro Bowl selection; 3rd First-team All-Pro selection; AP MVP; Passing yards leader
2	Antonio Brown	Wide receiver	Pittsburgh Steelers		▲2	2	6th Pro Bowl selection; 4th First-team All-Pro selection; First player to ever record 100+ receptions, 1200+ receiving yards and 5+ receiving touchdowns in 5 consecutive seasons.
3	Carson Wentz	Quarterback	Philadelphia Eagles		NR	3	1st Pro Bowl selection; 1st Second-team All-Pro selection; Bert Bell Award; Super Bowl champion (1st time)
4	Julio Jones	Wide receiver	Atlanta Falcons		▼1	4	5th Pro Bowl selection; 1st Second-team All-Pro selection; 1 of 2 players to ever record 1400+ receiving yards in 4 consecutive seasons (Marvin Harrison); 1 of 3 players with 1400+ receiving yards, but with <90 catches (Jerry Rice, Randy Moss)
5	Le'Veon Bell	Running back	Pittsburgh Steelers		▲4	5	3rd Pro Bowl selection; 2nd First-team All-Pro selection; Most average scrimmage yards per game since 2013 (129.0); Most scrimmage yards by a Steeler in his first 5 seasons (7,996 yards)
6	Todd Gurley	Running back	Los Angeles Rams		NR	6	2nd Pro Bowl selection; 1st First-team All-Pro selection; AP OPOY; Rushing touchdowns leader; All-purpose-yards leader in 2017; Highest percentage of team offensive yards in 2017 (5976 of 20983 yards, or 35.8%); 4th NFL RB to record 2000+ scrimmage yards and 15+ total touchdowns in a season (Eric Dickerson, Marshall Faulk, Steven Jackson)
7	Aaron Donald	Defensive tackle	Los Angeles Rams		▲8	7	4th Pro Bowl selection; 3rd First-team All-Pro selection; AP DPOY; Leads all DT's with 11 sacks and 27 quarterback hits in 2017; Only player with 25+ quarterback hits, 10+ sacks and 5 Forced fumbles in 2017
8	Drew Brees	Quarterback	New Orleans Saints		▲8	8	11th Pro Bowl selection; 4-time Pass completion percentage leader (72.0%, surpassed his own record set last season); No. 2 Passing yard leader (71,938 yards, behind Peyton Manning, needs 1,496 yards to surpass him.)
9	Von Miller	Linebacker	Denver Broncos		▼7	9	6th Pro Bowl selection; 3rd Second-team All-Pro selection; Most sacks since 2011 (83.5), 4th most all time in 7 seasons (Reggie White, DeMarcus Ware, Derrick Thomas)
10	Aaron Rodgers	Quarterback	Green Bay Packers		▼4	10	Highest ever career Passer rating (103.8) and Touchdown-Interception Ratio (313-79)
11	Russell Wilson	Quarterback	Seattle Seahawks		▲13	11	4th Pro Bowl selection; NFL passing touchdowns leader (34, his career high); Most wins by QB in first 6 seasons (65); Led all QB's with 134.1 Passer rating in 4th quarter in 2017
12	Luke Kuechly	Linebacker	Carolina Panthers		▲8	12	5th Pro Bowl selection; 4th First-team All-Pro selection, first defensive player to do so since 2013; Art Rooney Award winner; 100+ tackles in all 6 season in NFL; Most tackles in NFL since 2012 with 818
13	DeAndre Hopkins	Wide receiver	Houston Texans		NR (▲90)	13	2nd Pro Bowl selection; 1st First-team All-Pro selection; 2017 NFL receiving touchdowns leader (13, which is also a Texans franchise record); Only player with 100+ receptions and 10+ receiving touchdowns in 2017; No. 103 in the 2017 chart
14	Calais Campbell	Defensive end	Jacksonville Jaguars		▲69	14	3rd Pro Bowl selection; 1st First-team All-Pro selection; PFWA NFL Defensive Player of the Year
15	Rob Gronkowski	Tight end	New England Patriots		▲8	15	5th Pro Bowl selection; 5th First-team All-Pro selection; 76 receiving TD's since 2010, 1st in the NFL; 3rd all time in career receiving touchdowns by a tight end; NFL leader for receiving yards by a tight end in 2017 (1,084)
16	Khalil Mack	Defensive end	Oakland Raiders	Chicago Bears	▼11	16	3rd Pro Bowl selection; Named in 2 or more separate Pro Bowls in different positions (Defensive end, Outside Linebacker); Traded after the full list was revealed
17	Jalen Ramsey	Cornerback	Jacksonville Jaguars		NR	17	1st Pro Bowl selection; 1st First-team All-Pro selection
18	Ben Roethlisberger	Quarterback	Pittsburgh Steelers		▲4	18	6th Pro Bowl selection; Most 500+ passing yard games in NFL history (3)
19	Everson Griffen	Defensive end	Minnesota Vikings		▲73	19	3rd Pro Bowl selection; 1st Second-team All-Pro selection
20	Alvin Kamara	Running back	New Orleans Saints		NR	20	1st Pro Bowl Selection; Second-team All-Pro (2017); AP NFL Offensive Rookie of the Year (2017); Pepsi NFL Rookie of the Year (2017); PFWA All-Rookie Team (2017); 1st rookie since Gale Sayers to record 5 rushing and receiving touchdowns with a kickoff return touchdown.; 1st rookie since Charley Taylor with 700+ rushing and 700+ receiving yards in a season.; Leads NFL in yards per carry (6.07), 2nd in rushing touchdowns (14)
21	Bobby Wagner	Linebacker	Seattle Seahawks		▲18	21	4th Pro Bowl selection; 3rd First team All-Pro selection
22	A. J. Green	Wide receiver	Cincinnati Bengals		▼5	22	7th Pro Bowl selection; 1000 receiving yards in 7 of 8 seasons
23	Patrick Peterson	Cornerback	Arizona Cardinals		▼4	23	7th Pro Bowl selection; 5 Career Pro Bowl interceptions
24	Travis Kelce	Tight end	Kansas City Chiefs		▲2	24	3rd Pro Bowl selection; Second team All-Pro selection; Led all TE's in catches (83) and yards-after-catches
25	Cam Newton	Quarterback	Carolina Panthers		▲19	25	Career-high in rushing yards (754 yards); 3rd All-time in rushing yards by a quarterback
26	Cameron Jordan	Defensive end	New Orleans Saints		NR	26	3rd Pro Bowl selection; 1st First team All-Pro selection; 13 sacks in 2017
27	Larry Fitzgerald	Wide receiver	Arizona Cardinals		▲18	27	11th Pro Bowl selection; 2nd in Pro Bowl appearances amongst active player on the Top 100 list (Tom Brady, 13); Oldest player to record 100-catch and 1000+ receiving yard and 5+ touchdown season, 3rd consecutive season to reach the mark.
28	Chandler Jones	Defensive end	Arizona Cardinals		▲57	28	2nd Pro Bowl selection; 1st First team All-Pro selection; NFL Sacks leader (17) and Tackles-for-losses leader (28)
29	Matt Ryan	Quarterback	Atlanta Falcons		▼19	29	Fastest player to reach 40,000 passing yards (151 games)
30	LeSean McCoy	Running back	Buffalo Bills		▼3	30	6th Pro Bowl selection, with 5th in a row; 30th NFL player to rush for 10,000 yards in their career
31	Matthew Stafford	Quarterback	Detroit Lions		0	31	31,947 passing yards, 2nd in NFL since 2011 (Drew Brees, 35,179 yards)
32	Jadeveon Clowney	Defensive end	Houston Texans		▲17	32	2nd Pro Bowl selection; Career high in sacks (9.5), quarterback hits, tackles, forced fumbles and fumble recoveries; 1 of 2 players with 20+ quarterback hits and 20+ tackles for losses (Chandler Jones); 2nd with 21 tackles for losses (Chandler Jones, 28)
33	Kareem Hunt	Running back	Kansas City Chiefs		NR	33	1st Pro Bowl selection; PFWA All-Rookie Team; NFL rushing yards leader; PFWA Rookie of the Year; Most total scrimmage yards on debut (246 yards); Led all 2017 rookie with 1782 total scrimmage yards, as well as rushing yards (1327), and yards after contact (839); 6th rookie to win rushing title in rookie season in Super Bowl Era (Ezekiel Elliott was the previous winner in 2016)
34	DeMarcus Lawrence	Defensive end	Dallas Cowboys		NR	34	1st Pro Bowl selection; 1st 2nd-team All-Pro selection; Tied 2nd with 14.5 sacks in 2017 (Chandler Jones).; Most sacks in a season by a Cowboy since DeMarcus Ware in 2011
35	A. J. Bouye	Cornerback	Jacksonville Jaguars		NR	35	1st Pro Bowl selection; 1st 2nd-team All-Pro selection; 41.7 Passer rating allowed, best amongst CB's with 50+ targets, with no receiving touchdowns allowed
36	Adam Thielen	Wide receiver	Minnesota Vikings		NR	36	1st Pro Bowl selection; 1st 2nd-team All-Pro selection; 5th in Receiving yards in 2017; 1 of 3 undrafted playerswith a season with 90+ receptions and 1200+ season in Super-Bowl Era (Wes Welker, Rod Smith); 2nd in 3rd down receptions with 33 in 2017 (Keenan Allen, 26)
37	Joey Bosa	Defensive end	Los Angeles Chargers		▲63	37	1st Pro Bowl selection; 1 of 2 players with 70+ tackles and 10+ sacks (Khalil Mack)
38	Jared Goff	Quarterback	Los Angeles Rams		NR	38	1st Pro Bowl selection; Largest Passer rating increase in NFL between 2016-2017 (+36.9); 1 of 5 players in NFL history to have passer rating of 100+ in second season (Kurt Warner, Dan Marino, Carson Wentz, Russell Wilson)
39	Tyron Smith	Offensive tackle	Dallas Cowboys		▼21	39	5th Pro Bowl selection; 2nd straight year as highest-ranked offensive lineman; 1 of 2 tackles to make the last 5 Pro Bowls (Trent Williams)
40	Tyreek Hill	Wide receiver	Kansas City Chiefs		▼4	40	2nd Pro Bowl selection; 1 of 4 players with 1100 receiving yards and 7+ TD's (Antonio Brown, DeAndre Hopkins, Marvin Jones.)
41	Keenan Allen	Wide receiver	Los Angeles Chargers		NR	41	1st Pro Bowl selection; 2017 NFL Comeback Player of the Year; 1st player to ever record 10+ Receptions, 100+ Receiving yards, 1+ Receiving TD in 3 consecutive games; 1st in NFL in 3rd down receptions in 2016 (26)
42	Earl Thomas	Free safety	Seattle Seahawks		▼12	42	6th Pro Bowl selection; 2nd 2nd-team All-Pro selection; Only player with 25+ interceptions and 10+ forced fumbles since entering the NFL in 2010
43	Mark Ingram II	Running back	New Orleans Saints		NR	43	2nd Pro Bowl selection; 230 Carries, 1124 Rushing yards, 12 Rushing Touchdowns, 58 Receptions, 416 Receiving yards
44	David DeCastro	Guard	Pittsburgh Steelers		▲53	44	3rd Pro Bowl selection; 2nd 1st-team All-Pro selection; Allowed career-low 0.5 sacks
45	Davante Adams	Wide receiver	Green Bay Packers		NR (▲56)	45	1st Pro Bowl selection; 10 Receiving touchdowns in 2017; Lead NFL in receiving touchdowns since 2016 (22); No. 101 in the 2017 chart
46	Harrison Smith	Free safety	Minnesota Vikings		▲28	46	3rd Pro Bowl selection; 1st-team All-Pro; 78 tackles, 7 Tackles-for-losses, 5 interceptions, 12 passes defensed
47	Ryan Shazier	Linebacker	Pittsburgh Steelers		NR	47	2nd Pro Bowl selection; 89 tackles, 3 Tackles-for-losses, 3 interceptions, 11 passes defensed
48	Cameron Heyward	Defensive end	Pittsburgh Steelers		NR	48	1st Pro Bowl selection (Listed as Interior Linebacker); 1st First-Team All-Pro; 1 of 5 players with 10+ sacks, 15+ Tackles-for-losses and 3 passes defensed
49	Darius Slay	Cornerback	Detroit Lions		NR	49	1st Pro Bowl selection; 1st First-team All-Pro; Interceptions co-leader; Tied 1st in interception (8 with Kevin Byard), 1st in passes defensed (26)
50	Deshaun Watson	Quarterback	Houston Texans		NR	50	12th overall pick in the 2017 NFL draft; Broke Kurt Warners' record of 19 TD's in the first 7 starts since the merger
51	Case Keenum	Quarterback	Minnesota Vikings	Denver Broncos	NR	51	1st in Passer rating from weeks 10-17 (107.2); 1 of 6 QB's with 20+ passing TD's and under 10 interceptions
52	Jarvis Landry	Wide receiver	Miami Dolphins	Cleveland Browns	▼10	52	3rd Pro Bowl selection; Receptions leader; 400 receptions in 4 seasons (NFL record); Only player with 5+ receptions in all 16 games in 2017
53	Aqib Talib	Cornerback	Denver Broncos	Los Angeles Rams	▼16	53	5th Pro Bowl selection; 4th All-time with 10 Interception touchdowns (Rod Woodson with 12); 2nd with 34 interceptions since 2008
54	Ezekiel Elliott	Running back	Dallas Cowboys		▼47	54	Highest rookie debut in the history of the Top 100 chart in 2017.; 1 of 3 players to average 20+ carries/game. (Leonard Fournette, Le'Veon Bell); 1st with 98.3 yards per game in 2017; 1st in NFL in rushing yards and rushing TD's since 2016 (2,614, 22)
55	Xavier Rhodes	Cornerback	Minnesota Vikings		▲11	55	2nd Pro Bowl selection; 1st First-team All-Pro; 5th consecutive season with 10+ passes defensed
56	Philip Rivers	Quarterback	Los Angeles Chargers		▲17	56	7th Pro Bowl selection; 1 of 9 QB's in history to have 50,000+ career passing yards; Longest active starts streak in NFL (192 started); 9 of the past 10 seasons with 4000+ yards; 2nd with 4,515 passing yards (Tom Brady with 4,577 yards)
57	Trent Williams	Offensive tackle	Washington Redskins		▼10	57	6th Pro Bowl selection; No sacks allowed in 363 pass-blocking snaps in only 10 games played and started in 2017
58	Leonard Fournette	Running back	Jacksonville Jaguars		NR	58	Fastest and 2nd fastest recorded speed by RB on 2 carries (22 mph+ vs. Steelers, 21.76 mph vs. Rams); 1 of 3 players to average 20+ carries/game. (Ezekiel Elliott, Le'Veon Bell); Tied 2nd with 6 games with 100+ yards including playoffs (Todd Gurley with 7)
59	Casey Hayward	Cornerback	Los Angeles Chargers		▲5	59	2nd Pro Bowl selection; 2nd-Team AP All-Pro; Tied 2nd with 22 Passes defensed (Darius Slay, 26); Lowest completion percentage allowed in 2017 (42%); Tied 1st in interceptions since 2016 with 11 interceptions (Marcus Peters); 1st in passes defensed with 42 since 2016
60	Derek Carr	Quarterback	Oakland Raiders		▼49	60	3rd Pro Bowl selection; Franchise record 103 Passing TD's in 4 seasons
61	Ndamukong Suh	Defensive tackle	Miami Dolphins	Los Angeles Rams	▼6	61	Most quarterback hits amongst DT's since entering the league in 2010 (147)
62	Micah Hyde	Safety	Buffalo Bills		NR	62	1st Pro Bowl selection; 1st Second-team All-Pro selection; Career high in tackles, interceptions and passes defensed (82, 5, 13); 1 of 5 current players with 3 straight seasons of 3+ int; Made playoffs in every season in the NFL (4 with Green Bay Packers, 1 with the Bills)
63	Geno Atkins	Defensive tackle	Cincinnati Bengals		▲5	63	6th Pro Bowl selection; 1 of 2 DT's with 20+ quarterback hits and 9+ sacks (Aaron Donald); Most sacks amongst DT's since entering the league in 2010 (61.0).
64	Richard Sherman	Cornerback	Seattle Seahawks	San Francisco 49ers	▼43	64	Most interceptions and passes defensed since entering the league in 2011.; Lowest completion percentage allowed since 2011 with >300 targets (47.4%)
65	Stefon Diggs	Wide receiver	Minnesota Vikings		NR	65	115.0 Passer rating when targeted by Case Keenum; Reached 200 receptions in 40 games played in career
66	Jurrell Casey	Defensive tackle	Tennessee Titans		▲20	66	3rd Pro Bowl selection; Career-high 19 quarterback hits; 5 seasons with 5+ sacks
67	Telvin Smith	Linebacker	Jacksonville Jaguars		NR	67	1st Pro Bowl selection; 1st Second-team All-Pro selection; Most tackles in the first 4 seasons as a Jaguar (447); 1 of 3 players with 100+ tackles and 3 interceptions
68	Zach Ertz	Tight end	Philadelphia Eagles		NR	68	1st Pro Bowl selection; Super Bowl champion (1st time); Tied franchise record with 8 receiving TD's in a season (Brent Celek, 2009) in Super-Bowl era.; 3 straight seasons with 70+ receptions and 800+ receiving yards
69	Fletcher Cox	Defensive tackle	Philadelphia Eagles		▼31	69	3rd Pro Bowl selection; 3rd Second-team All-Pro selection; Super Bowl champion (1st time); 2nd best QB pressure percentage amongst DT's on pass rush snaps
70	Devonta Freeman	Running back	Atlanta Falcons		▼29	70	1 of 2 players with 3,000+ rushing yards and 30+ rushing TD's in the last 3 seasons. (Le'Veon Bell)
71	Zack Martin	Guard	Dallas Cowboys		▼13	71	4th Pro Bowl selection; 2nd Second-team All-Pro selection; Started all 64 regular season games and 3 post-season games in 4 seasons; Allowed least QB pressures by a guard (11); Allowed <2 sacks in each of his 4 seasons; Became highest paid guard in NFL in June, 2018.
72	Delanie Walker	Tight end	Tennessee Titans		▲3	72	3rd Pro Bowl selection; Pro Bowl Offensive MVP; 3rd amongst TE's with 3585 yards since 2014 (Rob Gronkowski, Travis Kelce), most receptions in a 4 year span
73	Thomas Davis	Linebacker	Carolina Panthers		▲16	73	3rd Pro Bowl selection; 1 of 3 players with 600+ tackles and 10+ interceptions since 2012 (Luke Kuechly, Lavonte David)
74	Cameron Wake	Defensive end	Miami Dolphins		▼12	74	9 straight seasons with 5+ sacks, on Julius Peppers went 10 straight.; Led team in sacks (10.5), quarterback hits (27) and tackles for losses (12)
75	Kam Chancellor	Safety	Seattle Seahawks		▼41	75	556 tackles since becoming a starter in 2011 (6th amongst safeties); First retired player to ever feature on the Top 100 list (announced retirement after the complete list was revealed).
76	Melvin Ingram	Defensive end	Los Angeles Chargers		NR	76	1st Pro Bowl selection; 1 of 4 players with 10+ sacks and 17+ tackles for losses in 2017 (Chandler Jones, Von Miller, Cameron Jordan)
77	Odell Beckham Jr.	Wide receiver	New York Giants		▼69	77	1 of 8 players in NFL history to record 300+ receptions, 4,000+ yards and 30+ TD's in the first 4 seasons; 2nd in NFL with 38 receiving TD's since 2014 (Antonio Brown); 3rd in NFL with 94.1 yards per game since 2014 (Brown, Julio Jones)
78	Taylor Lewan	Offensive tackle	Tennessee Titans		▼6	78	2nd Pro Bowl selection; 32 starts, 5 sacks conceded in 2-season span
79	Marcus Peters	Cornerback	Kansas City Chiefs	Los Angeles Rams	▼47	79	Tied 3rd in interceptions (5); Only player with 5+ in each of the last 3 seasons; 60.5 Passer rating allowed since 2015, 2nd to A. J. Bouye with 200+ targets
80	Kevin Byard	Safety	Tennessee Titans		NR	80	1st Pro Bowl selection; 1st All-Pro selection; Co-leader in interceptions (8 with Darius Slay); 1st player to record 80+ tackles and 8+ interceptions since Champ Bailey in 2006
81	Michael Thomas	Wide receiver	New Orleans Saints		NR	81	1st Pro Bowl selection; One of 3 WR's with 100+ receptions and 1,200+ yards (Antonio Brown, Keenan Allen); Most receptions in first 2 seasons
82	Marshon Lattimore	Cornerback	New Orleans Saints		NR	82	11th overall pick in the 2017 NFL draft; 1st Saint to win AP DROY; Leads all rookies with 5 interceptions and 18 passes defensed; 3rd lowest Passer rating allowed amongst CB's (45.3)
83	Linval Joseph	Defensive tackle	Minnesota Vikings		NR (▲21)	83	2nd Pro Bowl selection; 2nd amongst DT's with 68 tackles (76 by Damon Harrison); No. 104 in the 2017 chart
84	J. J. Watt	Defensive end	Houston Texans		▼49	84	2017 Walter Payton NFL Man of the Year Award
85	Bruce Irvin	Defensive end	Oakland Raiders		NR	85	Most Forced Fumbles in a two-season span (10)
86	Chris Harris Jr.	Cornerback	Denver Broncos		▼23	86	Tied fewest missed tackles amongst CB's with 40+ tackles (2); 68.0 Passer rating when targeted since 2014
87	Andrew Whitworth	Offensive tackle	Los Angeles Rams		NR	87	4th Pro Bowl selection; 1st-Team AP All-Pro; Oldest tackle to start 10+ games in 2017 (36)
88	Yannick Ngakoue	Defensive end	Jacksonville Jaguars		NR	88	1st Pro Bowl selection; 1 of 2 players with 10+ sacks and 5+ forced fumbles (Aaron Donald); Only player with 20+ sacks and 10+ forced fumbles since 2016
89	Jimmy Graham	Tight end	Seattle Seahawks	Green Bay Packers	NR	89	5th Pro Bowl selection; Tied second with Davante Adams with 10 receiving TD's (DeAndre Hopkins with 13); 4th most receiving TD's in history amongst TE's (69)
90	Jimmy Garoppolo	Quarterback	New England Patriots/San Francisco 49ers	San Francisco 49ers	NR	90	Fourth most wins by a quarterback to start his NFL career (7, tied with Daunte Culpepper, Dieter Brock, and Daryle Lamonica)
91	David Bakhtiari	Offensive tackle	Green Bay Packers		NR	91	2nd-Team AP All-Pro
92	Landon Collins	Safety	New York Giants		▼64	92	2nd Pro Bowl selection; Since 2015, leads all safeties in tackles (332) and 2nd in passes defensed (28); 3-time team leader (99)
93	Mike Daniels	Defensive end	Green Bay Packers		▼9	93	1st Pro Bowl selection; 1 of 4 DT's to record 4+ sacks for 5 straight seasons (Ndamoukong Suh, Gerald McCoy, Jurrell Casey)
94	Kirk Cousins	Quarterback	Washington Redskins	Minnesota Vikings	▼24	94	1st QB in NFL history to change teams after 3 consecutive seasons with 4,000+ passing yards
95	Lane Johnson	Offensive tackle	Philadelphia Eagles		NR	95	1st-Team AP All-Pro; 1st Pro Bowl selection; Super Bowl champion (1st time)
96	Malcolm Jenkins	Safety	Philadelphia Eagles		▼6	96	2nd Pro Bowl selection; Super Bowl champion (2nd time); 1 of 2 safeties with 5+ tackles for losses, and 8+ passes defensed (Harrison Smith)
97	Carlos Hyde	Running back	San Francisco 49ers	Cleveland Browns	NR	97	One of 3 RB's to lead team in carries and receptions (Todd Gurley, LeSean McCoy); 3-time team leader in rushing yards (2015–17)
98	C. J. Mosley	Linebacker	Baltimore Ravens		NR	98	3rd Pro Bowl selection; 3rd 2nd-Team AP All-Pro
99	Doug Baldwin	Wide receiver	Seattle Seahawks		▼11	99	2nd Pro Bowl selection; Tied fewest in drops with 100+ targets (2 drops of 116 targets)
100	Ha Ha Clinton-Dix	Safety	Green Bay Packers		▼23	100	1 of 2 safeties with 70+tackles, 3+ interceptions and <5 missed tackles; 1 of 7 safeties with multiple interceptions in 3 straight seasons.
