= AP Player of the Year =

AP Player of the Year may refer to:

In collegiate sports:

- AP College Basketball Player of the Year
- AP College Football Player of the Year

In professional sports:

- AP NFL Most Valuable Player
- AP NFL Comeback Player of the Year
- AP NFL Defensive Player of the Year
- AP NFL Offensive Player of the Year

== See also ==
- AP Athlete of the Year
