= AP NFL Rookie of the Year =

American football award given by the Associated Press

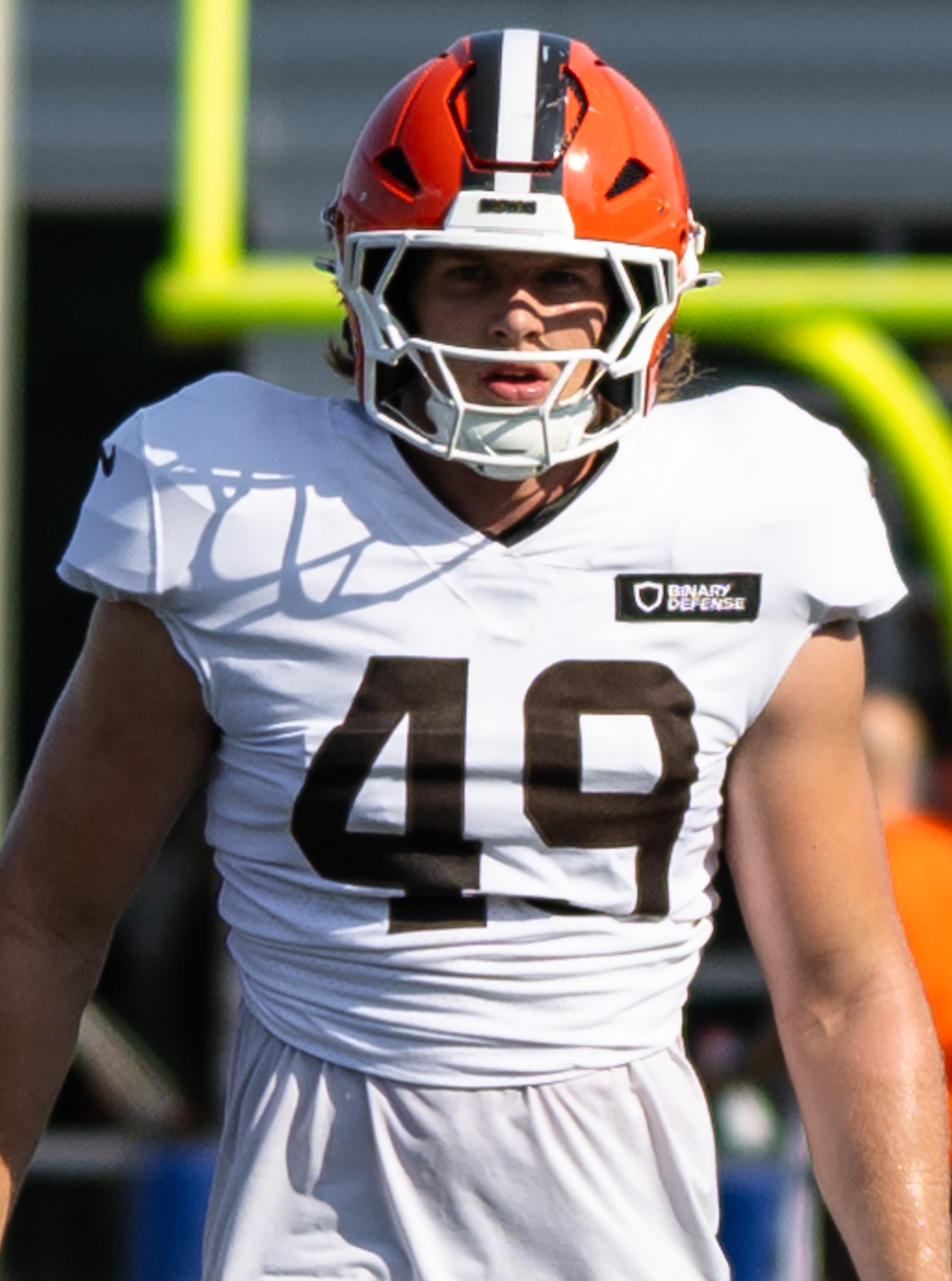
- Cleveland Browns linebacker Carson Schwesinger, 2025 defensive recipient
- Awarded for: Rookie of the year in the NFL
- Presented by: Associated Press

History
- First award: 1957 (Offensive); 1967 (Defensive)
- Most recent: Tetairoa McMillan (Offensive); Carson Schwesinger (Defensive)

The AP NFL Rookie of the Year (ROTY) is an annual award presented by the Associated Press (AP) to the top first-year offensive and defensive players in the National Football League (NFL). Winners are selected by a nationwide panel of 50 members of the AP who regularly cover the league. The AP has chosen an offensive rookie of the year since 1957 and a defensive rookie of the year since 1967. For the 2025 season, Carolina Panthers wide receiver Tetairoa McMillan and Cleveland Browns linebacker Carson Schwesinger were respectively named the offensive and defensive winners.

Ballots are cast at the end of the regular season and before the playoffs. Since 2011, winners of the AP Rookie of the Year awards are announced at the NFL Honors presentation the night before the Super Bowl along with other AP awards. While several organizations recognize their own NFL Rookie of the Year, the NFL considers the award given by the AP to be its official honor, with the winners listed in the league's annual Record and Fact Book.

== Winners ==
=== Offensive ===
List of AP NFL Offensive Rookie of the Year winners
| Season | Player | Position | Team | Ref. |
|---|---|---|---|---|
| 1957 | Jim Brown | Running back | Cleveland Browns | |
| 1958 | Jimmy Orr | Wide receiver | Pittsburgh Steelers | |
| 1959 | Boyd Dowler | Wide receiver | Green Bay Packers | |
| 1960 | Gail Cogdill | Split end | Detroit Lions | |
| 1961 | Mike Ditka | Tight end | Chicago Bears | |
| 1962 | Ron Bull | Running back | Chicago Bears | |
| 1963 | Paul Flatley | Wide receiver | Minnesota Vikings | |
| 1964 | Charley Taylor | Running back | Washington Redskins | |
| 1965 | Gale Sayers | Running back | Chicago Bears | |
| 1966 | Johnny Roland | Running back | St. Louis Cardinals | |
| 1967 | Mel Farr | Running back | Detroit Lions | |
| 1968 | Earl McCullouch | Wide receiver | Detroit Lions | |
| 1969 | Calvin Hill | Running back | Dallas Cowboys | |
| 1970 | Dennis Shaw | Quarterback | Buffalo Bills | |
| 1971 | John Brockington | Running back | Green Bay Packers | |
| 1972 | Franco Harris | Running back | Pittsburgh Steelers | |
| 1973 | Chuck Foreman | Running back | Minnesota Vikings | |
| 1974 | Don Woods | Running back | San Diego Chargers | |
| 1975 | Mike Thomas | Running back | Washington Redskins | |
| 1976 | Sammy White | Wide receiver | Minnesota Vikings | |
| 1977 | Tony Dorsett | Running back | Dallas Cowboys | |
| 1978 | Earl Campbell | Running back | Houston Oilers | |
| 1979 | Ottis Anderson | Running back | St. Louis Cardinals | |
| 1980 | Billy Sims | Running back | Detroit Lions | |
| 1981 | George Rogers | Running back | New Orleans Saints | |
| 1982 | Marcus Allen | Running back | Los Angeles Raiders | |
| 1983 | Eric Dickerson | Running back | Los Angeles Rams | |
| 1984 | Louis Lipps | Wide receiver | Pittsburgh Steelers | |
| 1985 | Eddie Brown | Wide receiver | Cincinnati Bengals | |
| 1986 | Rueben Mayes | Running back | New Orleans Saints | |
| 1987 | Troy Stradford | Running back | Miami Dolphins | |
| 1988 | John Stephens | Running back | New England Patriots | |
| 1989 | Barry Sanders | Running back | Detroit Lions | |
| 1990 | Emmitt Smith | Running back | Dallas Cowboys | |
| 1991 | Leonard Russell | Running back | New England Patriots | |
| 1992 | Carl Pickens | Wide receiver | Cincinnati Bengals | |
| 1993 | Jerome Bettis | Running back | Los Angeles Rams | |
| 1994 | Marshall Faulk | Running back | Indianapolis Colts | |
| 1995 | Curtis Martin | Running back | New England Patriots | |
| 1996 | Eddie George | Running back | Houston Oilers | |
| 1997 | Warrick Dunn | Running back | Tampa Bay Buccaneers | |
| 1998 | Randy Moss | Wide receiver | Minnesota Vikings | |
| 1999 | Edgerrin James | Running back | Indianapolis Colts | |
| 2000 | Mike Anderson | Running back | Denver Broncos | |
| 2001 | Anthony Thomas | Running back | Chicago Bears | |
| 2002 | Clinton Portis | Running back | Denver Broncos | |
| 2003 | Anquan Boldin | Wide receiver | Arizona Cardinals | |
| 2004 | Ben Roethlisberger | Quarterback | Pittsburgh Steelers | |
| 2005 | Cadillac Williams | Running back | Tampa Bay Buccaneers | |
| 2006 | Vince Young | Quarterback | Tennessee Titans | |
| 2007 | Adrian Peterson | Running back | Minnesota Vikings | |
| 2008 | Matt Ryan | Quarterback | Atlanta Falcons | |
| 2009 | Percy Harvin | Wide receiver | Minnesota Vikings | |
| 2010 | Sam Bradford | Quarterback | St. Louis Rams | |
| 2011 | Cam Newton | Quarterback | Carolina Panthers | |
| 2012 | Robert Griffin III | Quarterback | Washington Redskins | |
| 2013 | Eddie Lacy | Running back | Green Bay Packers | |
| 2014 | Odell Beckham Jr. | Wide receiver | New York Giants | |
| 2015 | Todd Gurley | Running back | St. Louis Rams | |
| 2016 | Dak Prescott | Quarterback | Dallas Cowboys | |
| 2017 | Alvin Kamara | Running back | New Orleans Saints | |
| 2018 | Saquon Barkley | Running back | New York Giants | |
| 2019 | Kyler Murray | Quarterback | Arizona Cardinals | |
| 2020 | Justin Herbert | Quarterback | Los Angeles Chargers | |
| 2021 | Ja'Marr Chase | Wide receiver | Cincinnati Bengals | |
| 2022 | Garrett Wilson | Wide receiver | New York Jets | |
| 2023 | C. J. Stroud | Quarterback | Houston Texans | |
| 2024 | Jayden Daniels | Quarterback | Washington Commanders | |
| 2025 | Tetairoa McMillan | Wide receiver | Carolina Panthers | |

=== Defensive ===
List of AP NFL Defensive Rookie of the Year winners
| Season | Player | Position | Team | Ref. |
|---|---|---|---|---|
| 1967 | Lem Barney | Cornerback | Detroit Lions | |
| 1968 | Claude Humphrey | Defensive end | Atlanta Falcons | |
| 1969 | Joe Greene | Defensive tackle | Pittsburgh Steelers | |
| 1970 | Bruce Taylor | Cornerback | San Francisco 49ers | |
| 1971 | Isiah Robertson | Linebacker | Los Angeles Rams | |
| 1972 | Willie Buchanon | Cornerback | Green Bay Packers | |
| 1973 | Wally Chambers | Defensive tackle | Chicago Bears | |
| 1974 | Jack Lambert | Linebacker | Pittsburgh Steelers | |
| 1975 | Robert Brazile | Linebacker | Houston Oilers | |
| 1976 | Mike Haynes | Cornerback | New England Patriots | |
| 1977 | A. J. Duhe | Defensive end | Miami Dolphins | |
| 1978 | Al Baker | Defensive end | Detroit Lions | |
| 1979 | Jim Haslett | Linebacker | Buffalo Bills | |
| 1980 | Buddy Curry Al Richardson | Linebacker | Atlanta Falcons | |
| 1981 | Lawrence Taylor | Linebacker | New York Giants | |
| 1982 | Chip Banks | Linebacker | Cleveland Browns | |
| 1983 | Vernon Maxwell | Linebacker | Baltimore Colts | |
| 1984 | Bill Maas | Defensive tackle | Kansas City Chiefs | |
| 1985 | Duane Bickett | Linebacker | Indianapolis Colts | |
| 1986 | Leslie O'Neal | Defensive end | San Diego Chargers | |
| 1987 | Shane Conlan | Linebacker | Buffalo Bills | |
| 1988 | Erik McMillan | Safety | New York Jets | |
| 1989 | Derrick Thomas | Linebacker | Kansas City Chiefs | |
| 1990 | Mark Carrier | Safety | Chicago Bears | |
| 1991 | Mike Croel | Linebacker | Denver Broncos | |
| 1992 | Dale Carter | Cornerback | Kansas City Chiefs | |
| 1993 | Dana Stubblefield | Defensive tackle | San Francisco 49ers | |
| 1994 | Tim Bowens | Defensive tackle | Miami Dolphins | |
| 1995 | Hugh Douglas | Defensive end | New York Jets | |
| 1996 | Simeon Rice | Defensive end | Arizona Cardinals | |
| 1997 | Peter Boulware | Linebacker | Baltimore Ravens | |
| 1998 | Charles Woodson | Cornerback | Oakland Raiders | |
| 1999 | Jevon Kearse | Defensive end | Tennessee Titans | |
| 2000 | Brian Urlacher | Linebacker | Chicago Bears | |
| 2001 | Kendrell Bell | Linebacker | Pittsburgh Steelers | |
| 2002 | Julius Peppers | Defensive end | Carolina Panthers | |
| 2003 | Terrell Suggs | Linebacker | Baltimore Ravens | |
| 2004 | Jonathan Vilma | Linebacker | New York Jets | |
| 2005 | Shawne Merriman | Linebacker | San Diego Chargers | |
| 2006 | DeMeco Ryans | Linebacker | Houston Texans | |
| 2007 | Patrick Willis | Linebacker | San Francisco 49ers | |
| 2008 | Jerod Mayo | Linebacker | New England Patriots | |
| 2009 | Brian Cushing | Linebacker | Houston Texans | |
| 2010 | Ndamukong Suh | Defensive tackle | Detroit Lions | |
| 2011 | Von Miller | Linebacker | Denver Broncos | |
| 2012 | Luke Kuechly | Linebacker | Carolina Panthers | |
| 2013 | Sheldon Richardson | Defensive end | New York Jets | |
| 2014 | Aaron Donald | Defensive tackle | St. Louis Rams | |
| 2015 | Marcus Peters | Cornerback | Kansas City Chiefs | |
| 2016 | Joey Bosa | Defensive end | San Diego Chargers | |
| 2017 | Marshon Lattimore | Cornerback | New Orleans Saints | |
| 2018 | Shaquille Leonard | Linebacker | Indianapolis Colts | |
| 2019 | Nick Bosa | Defensive end | San Francisco 49ers | |
| 2020 | Chase Young | Defensive end | Washington Football Team | |
| 2021 | Micah Parsons | Linebacker | Dallas Cowboys | |
| 2022 | Sauce Gardner | Cornerback | New York Jets | |
| 2023 | Will Anderson Jr. | Defensive end | Houston Texans | |
| 2024 | Jared Verse | Linebacker | Los Angeles Rams | |
| 2025 | Carson Schwesinger | Linebacker | Cleveland Browns | |

== See also ==
- AP NFL Offensive Player of the Year
- AP NFL Defensive Player of the Year
