= PFWA NFL Defensive Player of the Year Award =

American football defensive player award

The Pro Football Writers of America has annually honored a defensive player of the year in the National Football League since 1992. From 1992 through 2012, the award was presented in conjunction with Pro Football Weekly.

== Winners ==
Season	Player	Position	Team
1992	Cortez Kennedy	DT	Seattle
1993	Bruce Smith	DE	Buffalo
1994	Deion Sanders	CB	San Francisco
1995	Bryce Paup	OLB	Buffalo
1996	Bruce Smith	DE	Buffalo
1997	Dana Stubblefield	DT	San Francisco
1998	Reggie White	DE	Green Bay
1999	Warren Sapp	DT	Tampa Bay
2000	Ray Lewis	MLB	Baltimore
2001	Michael Strahan	DE	NY Giants
2002	Derrick Brooks	OLB	Tampa Bay
2003	Ray Lewis	MLB	Baltimore
2004	Ed Reed	S	Baltimore
2005	Brian Urlacher	MLB	Chicago
2006	Jason Taylor	DE	Miami
2007	Bob Sanders	S	Indianapolis
2008	James Harrison	OLB	Pittsburgh
2009	Charles Woodson	CB	Green Bay
2010	Clay Matthews III	OLB	Green Bay
2011	Terrell Suggs	OLB	Baltimore
2012	J. J. Watt	DE	Houston
2013	Robert Quinn	DE	St. Louis
2014	J. J. Watt	DE	Houston
2015	J. J. Watt	DE	Houston
2016	Khalil Mack	DE	Oakland
2017	Calais Campbell	DE	Jacksonville
2018	Aaron Donald	DT	LA Rams
2019	Stephon Gilmore	CB	New England
2020	Aaron Donald	DT	LA Rams
2021	T. J. Watt	OLB	Pittsburgh
2022	Nick Bosa	DE	San Francisco
2023	Myles Garrett	DE	Cleveland
2024	Patrick Surtain II	CB	Denver
2025	Myles Garrett	DE	Cleveland

== See also ==
- National Football League Defensive Player of the Year Award, overview of all NFL Defensive Player of the Year awards
- Pro Football Writers of America NFL Offensive Player of the Year Award
