= Aaron Donald =

American football player (born 1991)

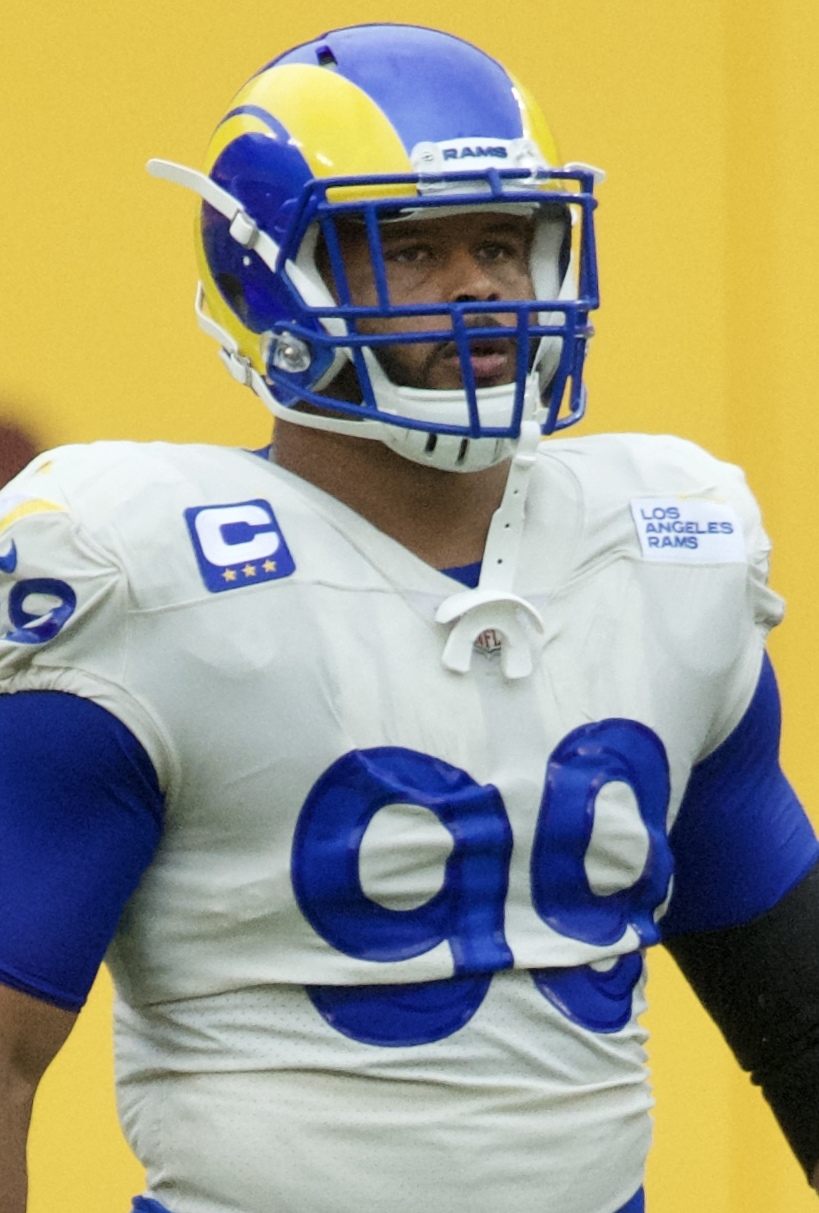
- Donald with the Los Angeles Rams in 2020

No. 99 – Los Angeles Rams
- Position: Defensive tackle
- Roster status: Active

Personal information
- Born: May 23, 1991 (age 35); Pittsburgh, Pennsylvania, U.S.
- Listed height: 6 ft 1 in (1.85 m)
- Listed weight: 280 lb (127 kg)

Career information
- High school: Penn Hills (Penn Hills, Pennsylvania)
- College: Pittsburgh (2010–2013)
- NFL draft: 2014: 1st round, 13th overall pick

Career history
- St. Louis / Los Angeles Rams (2014–2023, 2026–present)

Awards and highlights
- Super Bowl champion (LVI); 3× NFL Defensive Player of the Year (2017, 2018, 2020); NFL Defensive Rookie of the Year (2014); 8× First-team All-Pro (2015–2021, 2023); 10× Pro Bowl (2014–2023); Deacon Jones Award (2018); NFL 2010s All-Decade Team; PFWA All-Rookie Team (2014); Bronko Nagurski Trophy (2013); Chuck Bednarik Award (2013); Lombardi Award (2013); Outland Trophy (2013); Bill Willis Trophy (2013); Unanimous All-American (2013); Second-team All-American (2011); ACC Defensive Player of the Year (2013); First-team All-ACC (2013); First-team All-Big East (2012); Second-team All-Big East (2011); Pittsburgh Panthers No. 97 retired

Career NFL statistics as of Week 11, 2026
- Total tackles: 558
- Sacks: 112.5
- Forced fumbles: 24
- Fumble recoveries: 8
- Pass deflections: 21
- Stats at Pro Football Reference
- College Football Hall of Fame

Aaron Charles Donald (born May 23, 1991) is an American professional football defensive tackle for the Los Angeles Rams of the National Football League (NFL). He is considered one of the greatest defensive players of all time.

Donald played college football for the Pittsburgh Panthers, winning the Bronko Nagurski, Outland, and Bill Willis trophies and the Chuck Bednarik and Lombardi awards in 2013. Selected by the Rams in the first round of the 2014 NFL draft, Donald spent his first 10 seasons with the franchise before retiring in 2023, but returned in 2026. He has been named Defensive Player of the Year a record three times, along with receiving Pro Bowl selections in all 10 of his seasons and eight first-team All-Pro honors. Donald was also a member of the Rams team that won Super Bowl LVI. He was inducted to the College Football Hall of Fame in 2026.

== Early life ==
Aaron Charles Donald was born in Pittsburgh, Pennsylvania, on May 23, 1991. He grew up as one of three children in a working-class family in the city's Lincoln–Lemington–Belmar neighborhood; Donald later admitted that he was "lazy as a kid." Seeking to provide a sense of structure in his son's life, Donald's father introduced him to workouts, and they would wake up at 4:30 a.m. and work out for nearly two hours in the gym that his father installed in their basement by the time Donald was 12.

Donald attended Penn Hills High School, where he played high school football for head coach Ron Graham. Donald was a first-team All-State Class AAAA selection in each of his final two seasons, and compiled 63 tackles, 15 tackles for loss, and 11 sacks as a senior. Donald also started at offensive guard.

Considered a three-star prospect by Rivals.com, Donald was rated as the 37th best defensive tackle in the nation. He committed to hometown Pittsburgh over other scholarship offers from Toledo, Akron, and Rutgers.

== College career ==
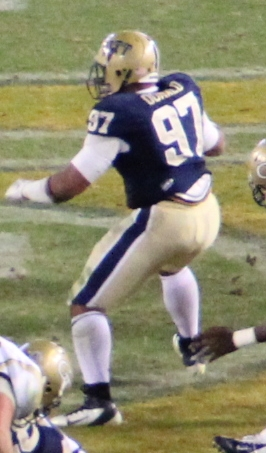
Donald in 2013

As a true freshman in 2010, Donald played in all 13 games as a reserve defensive tackle for the Pittsburgh Panthers. He recorded 11 tackles, including three for loss, and two sacks.

As a sophomore in 2011, Donald moved into the starting lineup and turned in a breakout campaign. He recorded 47 tackles, including 16 for loss, 11 sacks, and a forced fumble while being named a second-team All-Big East Conference selection.

As a junior in 2012, Donald recorded 64 tackles, including 18.5 for loss, 5.5 sacks, and a forced fumble, earning first-team All-Big East honors.

As a senior in 2013, Donald became one of the most productive defensive players in the entire NCAA. He posted 59 tackles, including a career best 28.5 for loss, 11 sacks, and four forced fumbles. Donald was named the ACC Defensive Player of the Year and was a unanimous All-American.

The University of Pittsburgh retired Donald's No. 97 jersey at halftime on November 15, 2025. Two months later, on January 14, 2026, he was inducted into the College Football Hall of Fame.

== Professional career ==
=== Pre-draft ===
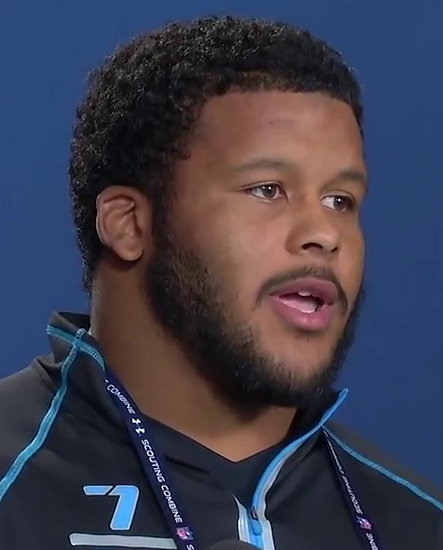
Donald at the 2014 NFL Combine

At the NFL Combine, Donald set the record for fastest 40-yard dash time for a defensive tackle at 4.68. The record was previously held by Tank Johnson, who ran a 4.69 in 2004. Donald drew comparisons to John Randle afterwards.

Pre-draft measurables
Height	Weight	Arm length	Hand span	Wingspan	40-yard dash	10-yard split	20-yard split	20-yard shuttle	Three-cone drill	Vertical jump	Broad jump	Bench press
6 ft 0 3/4 in (1.85 m)	285 lb (129 kg)	32 5/8 in (0.83 m)	9 7/8 in (0.25 m)	6 ft 5 5/8 in (1.97 m)	4.68 s	1.63 s	2.69 s	4.39 s	7.11 s	32 in (0.81 m)	9 ft 8 in (2.95 m)	35 reps
All values from NFL Combine

=== St. Louis / Los Angeles Rams (first stint) ===
==== 2014 ====
Donald was selected by the St. Louis Rams in the first round (13th overall) of the 2014 NFL draft. On June 16, 2014, the Rams signed him to a four-year, fully guaranteed $10.14 million rookie contract with a $5.69 million signing bonus and a fifth-year option.

Donald made his regular season debut during the season-opening 34–6 loss to the Minnesota Vikings and finished with four solo tackles. In the next game against the Tampa Bay Buccaneers, Donald recorded two tackles and his first NFL sack on Josh McCown during the narrow 19–17 road victory.

During Week 6 against the San Francisco 49ers on Monday Night Football, Donald was given his first career start and finished the 31–17 loss with four solo tackles. In the next game against the Seattle Seahawks, Donald had five combined tackles and a sack during the narrow 28–26 victory. The following week against the Kansas City Chiefs, he recorded two solo tackles and a forced fumble in the 34–7 road loss.

During a Week 9 13–10 road victory over the 49ers, Donald recorded two tackles and sacked Colin Kaepernick once. From Weeks 11–15, he recorded a sack in each game and had a pass deflection in the Week 13 52–0 shutout victory over the Oakland Raiders. In the regular season finale against the Seahawks, Donald had a season-high seven combined tackles and strip-sacked Russell Wilson once during the 20–6 road loss.

Donald finished his rookie year with 47 combined tackles (37 solo), nine sacks, two forced fumbles, and a pass deflection in 16 games and 12 starts. Donald was one of five rookies selected to the 2015 Pro Bowl. He won the NFL Defensive Rookie of the Year award and was named to the NFL All-Rookie Team.

==== 2015 ====
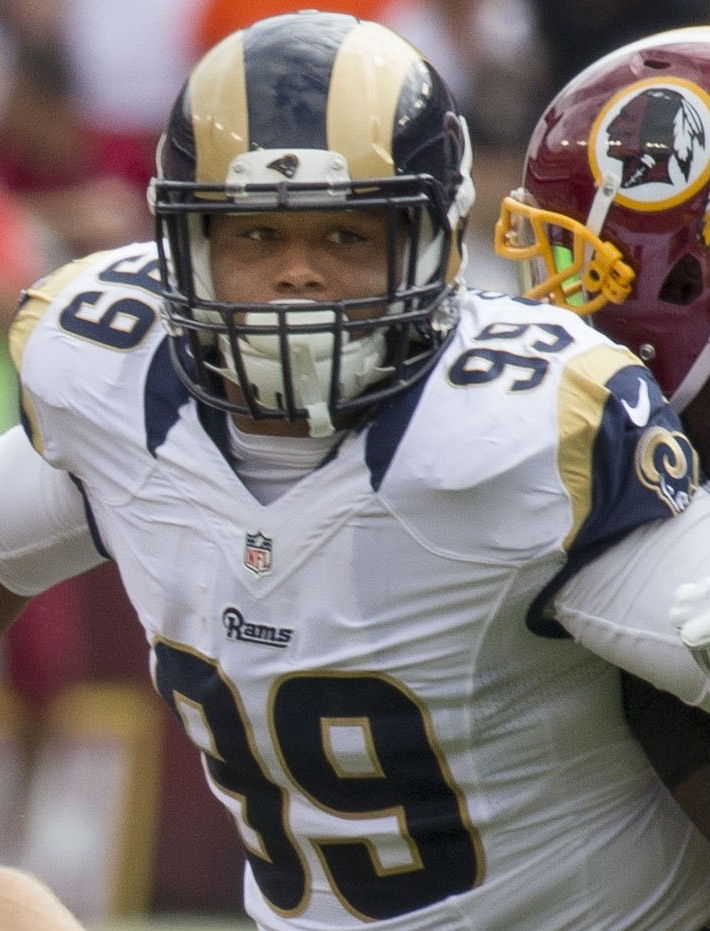
Donald in 2015

Donald began the 2015 season as a starting defensive tackle. During the season opener against the Seahawks, he finished with nine tackles and two sacks in the 34–31 overtime victory. Donald was named NFC Defensive Player of the Week for the first time after his performance. In the next game against the Washington Redskins, Donald had five tackles and 0.5 sacks during the 24–10 road loss. The following week against the Pittsburgh Steelers, he recorded four tackles and a sack in the 12–6 loss.

During a Week 7 24–6 victory over the Cleveland Browns, Donald had three solo tackles and a sack. Three weeks later against the Chicago Bears, he recorded seven tackles, 1.5 sacks, and a fumble recovery in the 37–13 loss. In the next game against the Baltimore Ravens, Donald had a season-high nine tackles and sacked Joe Flacco once during the 16–13 road loss.

During Week 13 against the Arizona Cardinals, Donald recorded seven tackles and a sack in the 27–3 loss. In the next game against the Detroit Lions, he had five tackles and sacked Matthew Stafford thrice during the 21–14 victory. Donald earned his second NFC Defensive Player of the Week award of the season for his spectacular performance against the Lions. During the regular season finale against the 49ers, Donald recorded two solo tackles and a pass deflection in the 19–16 overtime road loss.

Donald finished his second professional season with 69 combined tackles (43 solo), 11 sacks, a pass deflection, and a fumble recovery in 16 games and starts. He earned a First-team All-Pro selection for the first time in his NFL career. Donald was also a Pro Bowl selection for the second consecutive season. He was ranked 14th by his fellow players on the NFL Top 100 Players of 2016.

==== 2016: Move to Los Angeles ====
During the season-opener against the 49ers on Monday Night Football, Donald had three solo tackles before being ejected late in the fourth quarter of the 28–0 shutout road loss for making illegal contact with an official. He was eventually fined $21,269 for unnecessary roughness ($9,115) and unsportsmanlike conduct ($12,154). Two weeks later against the Buccaneers, Donald recorded two tackles and two pass deflections in the 37–32 road victory. In the next game against the Cardinals, he had five tackles, 1.5 sacks, and a forced fumble during the 17–13 road victory. Donald was named NFC Defensive Player of the Week for his performance against the Cardinals.

During a Week 5 30–19 loss to the Buffalo Bills, Donald recorded two tackles and 0.5 sacks. In the next game against the Lions, he had four solo tackles and a sack during the 31–28 road loss. Donald was later fined $18,231 for an unsportsmanlike conduct penalty he committed against the Lions. Three weeks later against the Carolina Panthers, Donald recorded four solo tackles and sacked Cam Newton twice in the 13–10 loss.

During Week 11 against the Miami Dolphins, Donald had two tackles and a pass deflection in the 14–10 loss. In the next game against the New Orleans Saints, he recorded four solo tackles and strip-sacked Drew Brees once during the 49–21 road loss. Two weeks later against the Atlanta Falcons, Donald had two tackles and sacked Matt Ryan once in the 42–14 loss.

During a Week 15 24–3 road loss to the Seahawks on Thursday Night Football, Donald recorded two combined tackles and a pass deflection. In the next game against the 49ers, he had five tackles and a sack during the narrow 22–21 loss. During the regular season finale against the Cardinals, Donald deflected a pass in the 44–6 loss.

Donald finished the 2016 season with 47 combined tackles (35 solo), eight sacks, five pass deflections, and two forced fumbles in 16 games and starts. He was named to his third straight Pro Bowl and his second First-team All-Pro. Donald was also ranked 15th on the NFL Top 100 Players of 2017.

==== 2017: First Defensive Player of the Year Award ====
On April 12, 2017, the Rams exercised the fifth-year option on Donald's contract. He did not report to training camp and preseason due to a contract extension dispute. Donald accumulated about $1.4 million in fines due to his non-participation, and each game that he missed cost him one game check from his base salary of $1.8 million. On September 9, Donald reported to the Rams and passed his physical, but he did not play in the season-opener against the Indianapolis Colts the next day, which the Rams won 46–9.

Donald made his season debut during Week 2 against the Redskins and finished the 27–20 loss with two tackles. In the next game against the 49ers on Thursday Night Football, he had three tackles and sacked Brian Hoyer during the fourth quarter to seal a narrow 41–39 road victory for the Rams. From Weeks 6–10, Donald recorded a sack in each of the four games and had a forced fumble in three of them while also deflecting a pass in the Week 10 33–7 victory over the Houston Texans.

During a Week 12 26–20 victory over the Saints, Donald had five tackles and a sack. In the next game against the Cardinals, he recorded three solo tackles and sacked Blaine Gabbert twice during the 32–16 road victory. Two weeks later against the Seahawks, Donald had five tackles, three sacks, and a forced fumble in the 42–7 road victory.

During Week 16 against the Tennessee Titans, Donald recorded five tackles and a forced fumble in the 27–23 road victory. He did not play in the regular season finale against the 49ers as the Rams opted to rest several starters for the playoffs.

Donald finished the 2017 season with 41 combined tackles (32 solo), 11 sacks, a career-high five forced fumbles, and a pass deflection in 14 games and starts. He was named to his fourth straight Pro Bowl. Donald was also later named a first-team All-Pro for the third time. The Rams finished the 2017 season atop the NFC West with an 11–5 record and qualified for the playoffs as the #3-seed. During the Wild Card Round against the Falcons, he made his postseason debut and finished the 26–13 loss with five tackles and 0.5 sacks. After a spectacular 2017 season, Donald was named the NFL Defensive Player of the Year. He was ranked seventh by his peers on the NFL Top 100 Players of 2018.

==== 2018: Second Defensive Player of the Year Award and Super Bowl LIII ====
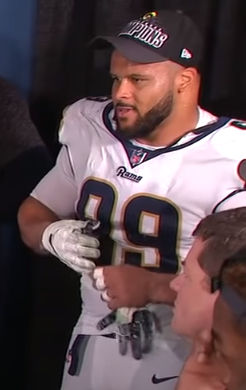
Donald after winning the NFC Championship Game

On August 31, 2018, after holding out all offseason, Donald signed a six-year, $135 million contract extension with $87 million guaranteed. The deal made him the highest paid defensive player in NFL history until Khalil Mack signed a $141 million contract with the Chicago Bears the next day after being traded from the Oakland Raiders.

During a Week 4 38–31 victory over the Vikings on Thursday Night Football, Donald had five tackles and his first two sacks of the season on Kirk Cousins. In the next game against the Seahawks, Donald recorded two tackles and a sack during the narrow 33–31 road victory. The following week against the Denver Broncos, he had three tackles and sacked Case Keenum once in the 23–20 road victory.

During Week 7 against the 49ers, Donald recorded a season-high nine tackles, four sacks on C. J. Beathard, a forced fumble, and a fumble recovery in the 39–10 road victory. Donald was named NFC Defensive Player of the Week for his spectacular performance against the 49ers. In the next game against the Green Bay Packers, Donald had three tackles and sacked Aaron Rodgers twice during the narrow 29–27 victory. Donald was later named the NFC Defensive Player of the Month for the month of October after recording eight sacks, 17 tackles, a forced fumble, and a fumble recovery. The following week against the Saints, Donald had a solo tackle, a pass deflection, and a fumble recovery in the 45–35 road loss.

During a Week 10 36–31 victory over the Seahawks, Donald had four tackles and 2.5 sacks. In the next game against the Chiefs, Donald recorded four tackles and strip-sacked Patrick Mahomes twice during the 54–51 victory. Following a Week 12 bye, the Rams went on the road to face the Lions. Donald finished the 30–16 victory with six tackles and sacked Matthew Stafford twice (one was a strip-sack).

During Week 16 against the Cardinals, Donald recorded seven tackles and sacked rookie Josh Rosen thrice in the 31–9 road victory. Donald earned his second NFC Defensive Player of the Week award of the season for his spectacular performance. Donald's three sacks brought his season total to 19.5, which broke the record for most sacks in a season by a defensive tackle, which was previously held by Keith Millard with 18. In the regular season finale against the 49ers, Donald had four solo tackles and sacked Nick Mullens once during the 48–32 victory. Donald was named NFC Defensive Player of the Month for December, his second such award of the season.

Donald finished the 2018 season with 59 combined tackles (41 solo), a league-leading 20.5 sacks, four forced fumbles, two fumble recoveries, and a pass deflection in 16 games and starts. His 25 tackles for loss also led the league. Donald was named to his fifth Pro Bowl. He was also named to the AP All-Pro First-team, being the only unanimous selection. Donald was later named NFL Defensive Player of the Year for the second consecutive season, joining Lawrence Taylor and J. J. Watt as the only players who have won the award in consecutive seasons. The Rams finished atop the NFC West with a 13–3 record and qualified for the playoffs as the #2-seed. In the Divisional Round against the Dallas Cowboys, Donald recorded two solo tackles during the 30–22 victory. During the NFC Championship Game against the Saints, he once again had two solo tackles in the controversial 26–23 overtime road victory as the Rams advanced to Super Bowl LIII. In the Super Bowl against the New England Patriots, Donald recorded five tackles during the 13–3 loss, with the Patriots offensive linemen (including Joe Thuney) double teaming Donald in order to neutralize his effectiveness, which was cited as a key factor in the result. Donald was ranked as the best player in the NFL by his peers on the NFL Top 100 Players of 2019.

==== 2019 ====
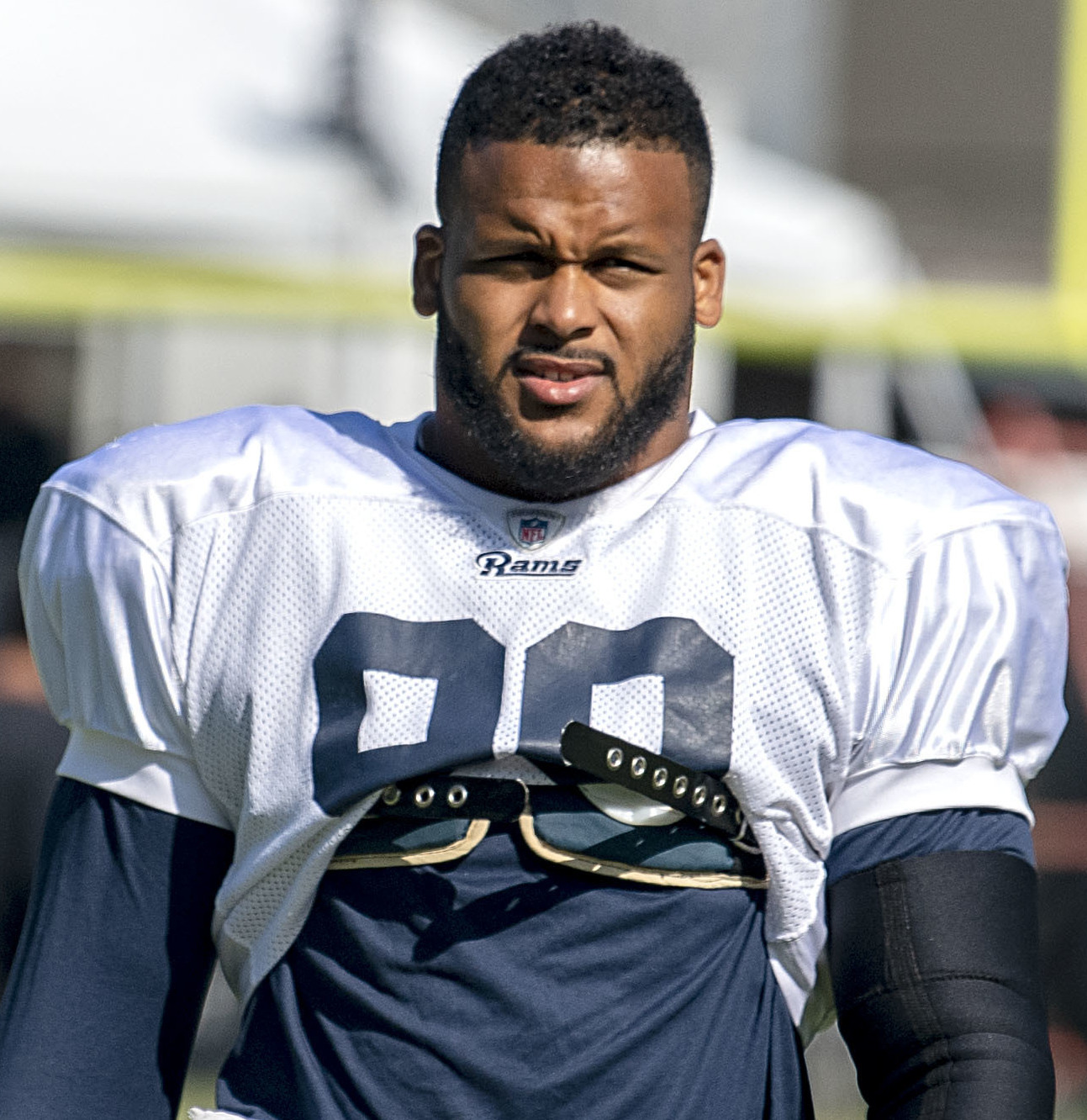
Donald in 2019

During Week 3 against the Browns on Sunday Night Football, Donald recorded four tackles and his first sack of the season on Baker Mayfield in the 20–13 road victory. However, Donald was later fined $21,056 for a roughing-the-passer hit on Mayfield. Three weeks later against the 49ers, Donald had seven tackles and sacked Jimmy Garoppolo twice (one was a strip-sack) in the 20–7 loss. In the next game against the Falcons, Donald recorded two tackles along with a strip-sack on Matt Ryan and recovered the football during the 37–10 road victory.

During a Week 8 24–10 victory over the Cincinnati Bengals in London, Donald had three solo tackles and sacked Andy Dalton once. Following a Week 9 bye, the Rams went on the road to face the Steelers. Donald finished the 17–12 loss with six tackles and sacked Mason Rudolph once. In the next game against the Bears on Sunday Night Football, Donald recorded four tackles, two sacks, and a pass deflection during the 17–7 victory. He was named NFC Defensive Player of the Week for his performance.

During Week 13 against the Cardinals, Donald recorded two tackles and 1.5 sacks in the 34–7 road victory. In the next game against the Seahawks, he once again had two tackles and 1.5 sacks in addition to a pass deflection during the 28–12 victory. Two weeks later against the 49ers, Donald recorded three tackles and sacked Garoppolo 1.5 times in the 34–31 road loss as the Rams were eliminated from playoff contention.

Donald finished the 2019 season with 48 combined tackles (29 solo), 12.5 sacks, two pass deflections, two forced fumbles, and a fumble recovery in 16 games and starts. He was named to his sixth Pro Bowl. Donald also earned First Team All-Pro honors. He was ranked third by his fellow players on the NFL Top 100 Players of 2020.

==== 2020: Third Defensive Player of the Year Award ====
During the season-opening 20–17 victory over the Cowboys on Sunday Night Football, Donald had four tackles and his first sack of the season on Dak Prescott. Two weeks later against the Bills, Donald recorded six tackles and sacked Josh Allen twice (one was a strip-sack where he recovered the football) in the 35–32 road loss. In the next game against the New York Giants, Donald had two combined tackles and 0.5 sacks during the 17–9 victory.

During Week 5 against the Washington Football Team, Donald recorded four solo tackles and four sacks (one was a strip-sack) in the 30–10 road victory. He was named NFC Defensive Player of the Week for his spectacular performance. Two weeks later against the Bears on Monday Night Football, Donald had three tackles and 0.5 sacks on Nick Foles in the 24–10 victory. In the next game against the Dolphins, he recorded four tackles and a strip-sack on rookie quarterback Tua Tagovailoa on Tagovailoa's first career passing attempt during the 28–17 road loss.

During a Week 12 23–20 loss to the 49ers, Donald had five tackles, a sack, a forced fumble, and a pass deflection. In the next game against the Cardinals, he recorded three tackles and a sack during the 38–28 road victory. The following week against the Patriots on Thursday Night Football, Donald had two tackles and 1.5 sacks in the 24–3 victory. During Week 16 against the Seahawks, he recorded two tackles and a sack in the 20–9 road loss.

Donald finished the 2020 season with 45 combined tackles (27 solo), 13.5 sacks, four forced fumbles, a fumble recovery, and a pass deflection in 16 games and starts. He was named to the 2021 Pro Bowl. Donald also earned First Team All-Pro honors. The Rams finished second in the NFC West with a 10–6 record and qualified for the playoffs as the #6-seed. During the Wild Card Round against the Seahawks, Donald recorded three tackles and sacked Russell Wilson twice in the 30–20 road victory. In the Divisional Round against the Packers, Donald had one tackle during the 32–18 road loss. He was named NFL Defensive Player of the Year for the third time in four years. Donald was ranked second by his fellow players on the NFL Top 100 Players of 2021.

==== 2021: Super Bowl LVI ====
During the season-opening 34–14 victory over the Bears on Sunday Night Football, Donald recorded three tackles and his first sack of the season on Andy Dalton. Two weeks later against the Buccaneers, Donald had three tackles, a pass deflection, a forced fumble, and sacked Tom Brady once in the 34–24 victory.

During Week 5 against the Seahawks on Thursday Night Football, Donald had seven tackles, a sack, and a pass deflection in the 26–17 road victory. In the next game against the Giants, he recorded two tackles, 0.5 sacks, and a pass deflection during the 38–11 road victory. Two weeks later against the Texans, Donald had four tackles and sacked Davis Mills 1.5 times in the 38–22 victory.

During a Week 9 28–16 loss to the Titans on Sunday Night Football, Donald recorded four tackles and sacked Ryan Tannehill once. In the next game against the 49ers on Monday Night Football, Donald had a season-high eight tackles during the 31–10 road loss. Following a Week 11 bye, the Rams went on the road to face the Packers. He finished the 36–28 loss with six tackles, but choked guard Lucas Patrick. Donald was later fined $10,300 for his behavior.

During Week 13 against the Jacksonville Jaguars, Donald had five tackles, a sack, and a forced fumble in the 37–7 victory. In the next game against the Cardinals on Monday Night Football, he recorded five tackles, a pass deflection, and sacked Kyler Murray thrice during the 30–23 road victory. Donald was named NFC Defensive Player of the Week for his spectacular performance against the Cardinals. The following week against the Seahawks, Donald had five tackles and a sack in the 20–10 victory.

During a Week 16 30–23 road victory over the Vikings, Donald recorded six tackles and strip-sacked Kirk Cousins once. Donald earned NFC Defensive Player of the Month honors for his performance in December. In the next game against the Ravens, Donald had five tackles, 0.5 sacks, and a forced fumble during the narrow 20–19 road victory.

Donald finished the 2021 season with a career-high 84 combined tackles (38 solo), 12.5 sacks, four forced fumbles, and four pass deflections in 17 games and starts. He also earned a Pro Bowl nomination and First Team All-Pro honors. The Rams finished the 2021 season atop the NFC West with a 12–5 record and qualified for the playoffs as the #4-seed. During the Wild Card Round against the Cardinals, Donald recorded a tackle and 0.5 sacks in the 34–11 victory. However, similar to what happened during Week 12, he choked D. J. Humphries and was later fined $10,815 for unnecessary roughness. In the Divisional Round against the Buccaneers, Donald had five tackles, a sack, and a pass deflection during the 30–27 road victory. During the NFC Championship Game against the 49ers, he recorded three tackles while his pressure on quarterback Jimmy Garoppolo led to a game-sealing interception and the 20–17 victory as the Rams advanced to their second Super Bowl in four seasons. In Super Bowl LVI against the Bengals, Donald had four tackles and two sacks, as well as the game-sealing pressure play on Joe Burrow on a fourth-and-1 with less than a minute remaining that resulted in an incompletion and the 23–20 victory. Donald was ranked second by his fellow players on the NFL Top 100 Players of 2022.

==== 2022: Injury-shortened season ====
On June 7, 2022, the Rams announced they had renegotiated Donald's existing contract extension that he signed in 2018. The deal, which added $40 million over the last three years of the original six-year, $135 million deal, made Donald the first non-quarterback to average over $30 million per season. On August 25, he was part of a joint practice fight between the Rams and Bengals. During the fight, Donald was recorded swinging a Bengals player's helmet at Bengals players.

During the season-opener against the Bills, Donald had two solo tackles and a sack in the 31–10 loss. In the next game against the Falcons, he recorded two tackles and a fumble recovery during the 31–27 victory. The following week against the Cardinals, Donald had six tackles and his 100th career sack on Kyler Murray in the 20–12 road victory.

During a Week 5 22–10 loss to the Cowboys, Donald recorded six tackles and sacked Cooper Rush twice (one was a strip sack). In the next game against the Panthers, Donald had four tackles and a pass deflection during the 24–10 victory. Three weeks later against the Buccaneers, he recorded four tackles, a sack, and a pass deflection in the 16–13 road loss.

During Week 13 against the Chiefs, Donald had three solo tackles in the 26–10 road loss but suffered a high ankle sprain. He missed the rest of the season as a result. Without Donald, the Rams finished third in the NFC West with a 5–12 record and missed out on the playoffs. Donald finished the 2022 season with 49 combined tackles (27 solo), five sacks, two pass deflections, a forced fumble, and a fumble recovery in 11 games and starts. For the ninth time, he earned Pro Bowl honors. Donald was ranked 11th by his fellow players on the NFL Top 100 Players of 2023.

==== 2023: Initial final season ====
During the season-opening 30–13 road victory over the Seahawks, Donald recorded four tackles and 0.5 sacks. Two weeks later against the Bengals on Monday Night Football, he had a season-high seven tackles and a sack in the 19–16 road loss. In the next game against the Colts, Donald recorded five tackles and sacked Anthony Richardson once during the 29–23 overtime road victory.

During Week 8 against the Cowboys, Donald had four tackles and two sacks in the 43–20 road loss. In the next game against the Packers, he recorded four tackles and sacked Jordan Love once during the 20–3 road loss. Following a Week 10 bye, the Rams returned home and faced the Seahawks. Donald finished the narrow 17–16 victory with a tackle and a pass deflection.

During a Week 13 36–19 victory over the Browns, Donald recorded five tackles and 0.5 sacks. In the next game against the Ravens, he had a pass deflection during the 37–31 overtime road loss. Three weeks later against the Giants, Donald recorded five tackles, a pass deflection, and sacked Tyrod Taylor twice in the narrow 26–25 road victory. Donald did not play in the regular season finale against the 49ers as the Rams opted to rest several starters for the playoffs.

Donald finished the 2023 season with 53 combined tackles (28 solo), eight sacks, and three pass deflections in 16 games and starts. He earned Pro Bowl honors for the 10th time and first-team All-Pro honors for the eighth time. The Rams finished second in the NFC West with a 10–7 record and qualified for the playoffs as the #6-seed. During the Wild Card Round against the Lions, Donald had three tackles in the narrow 24–23 road loss.

=== Initial retirement ===
On March 15, 2024, Donald announced his retirement on social media. In a July 2024 interview with former Miami Dolphins linebacker Channing Crowder, Donald cited feeling more than accomplished in the sport and no longer having the desire or passion to continue the persistent training as reasons for his retirement at age 32.

=== Los Angeles Rams (second stint) ===
During the summer of 2026, it was reported that the 35-year-old Donald was considering an NFL comeback with the Rams, a decision partially motivated by the possibility of teaming up with new offseason trade acquisition Myles Garrett from the Browns. On August 5, Donald participated in an official 45 minute workout with the team, and had a second workout 11 days later. On August 30, Donald came out of retirement and signed a one-year, $20 million contract with an additional $10 million in potential incentives that could be earned. In Week 1, Donald was listed as inactive and did not make the trip with the Rams to Melbourne, Australia for the team's NFL International Series game (a 27–7 loss to San Francisco). His inactivity was not related to injuries, though the Rams were not willing to rush Donald's return. In addition, Donald was not able to secure a visa to legally enter Australia. Donald returned to the Rams' starting lineup in Week 2 against the New York Giants on Monday Night Football. Donald played the majority of his team's defensive snaps and had three tackles (one for loss) in the Rams' 28–6 victory.

Donald missed the Rams' 24–20 victory over the Philadelphia Eagles due to a back injury. During Monday Night Football against the Buffalo Bills in Week 5, Donald was spotted grabbing the face mask of O'Cyrus Torrence, though the officials failed to notice it as the Bills offense was called for an illegal shift at the time. When the game went into overtime, Donald made a fumble recovery that was forced by Nate Landman, but the Rams were unable to capitalize on it and lost 37–34. Against the Los Angeles Chargers in Week 8, Donald had two tackles (including one for a loss) and late in the third quarter appeared poised to score his first career touchdown following a forced fumble of Chargers quarterback Justin Herbert but failed to recover the loose ball in the Rams' 24–9 victory.

== Career statistics ==
Legend
	NFL Defensive Player of the Year
	Won the Super Bowl
	Led the league
**Bold**	Career high

=== NFL ===
==== Regular season ====
Year	Team	Games		Tackles					Interceptions						Fumbles			
Year	Team	GP	GS	Cmb	Solo	Ast	Sck	TFL	PD	Int	Yds	Avg	Lng	TD	FF	FR	Yds	TD
2014	STL	16	12	48	38	10	9.0	18	1	—	—	—	—	—	2	0	0	0
2015	STL	16	16	69	**44**	25	11.0	22	1	—	—	—	—	—	0	1	**40**	0
2016	LAR	16	16	47	36	11	8.0	17	**5**	—	—	—	—	—	2	0	0	0
2017	LAR	14	14	41	32	9	11.0	15	1	—	—	—	—	—	**5**	1	0	0
2018	LAR	16	16	59	41	18	**20.5**	**25**	1	—	—	—	—	—	4	**2**	0	0
2019	LAR	16	16	48	29	19	12.5	20	2	—	—	—	—	—	2	1	0	0
2020	LAR	16	16	45	27	18	13.5	14	1	—	—	—	—	—	4	1	0	0
2021	LAR	17	17	**84**	38	**46**	12.5	19	4	—	—	—	—	—	4	0	0	0
2022	LAR	11	11	49	27	22	5.0	10	2	—	—	—	—	—	1	1	0	0
2023	LAR	16	16	53	28	25	8.0	16	3	—	—	—	—	—	0	0	0	0
2026	LAR	8	8	15	8	7	1.5	4	0	—	—	—	—	—	0	1	0	0
Career		162	158	558	348	210	112.5	180	21	0	0	0.0	0	0	24	8	40	0

==== Postseason ====
Year	Team	Games		Tackles					Interceptions						Fumbles			
Year	Team	GP	GS	Cmb	Solo	Ast	Sck	TFL	PD	Int	Yds	Avg	Lng	TD	FF	FR	Yds	TD
2017	LAR	1	1	5	4	1	0.5	1	0	—	—	—	—	—	—	—	—	—
2018	LAR	3	3	9	5	4	0.0	3	0	—	—	—	—	—	—	—	—	—
2020	LAR	2	2	4	3	1	2.0	2	0	—	—	—	—	—	—	—	—	—
2021	LAR	4	4	**13**	**6**	**7**	**3.5**	**4**	**1**	—	—	—	—	—	—	—	—	—
2023	LAR	1	1	3	1	2	0.0	0	0	—	—	—	—	—	—	—	—	—
Career		11	11	34	19	15	6.0	10	1	0	0	0.0	0	0	0	0	0	0

=== College ===
Season	Team	GP	Cmb	TfL	Sck	Int	FF
2010	Pittsburgh	13	11	3	2.0	0	0
2011	Pittsburgh	13	45	16	**11.0**	0	1
2012	Pittsburgh	13	**64**	18.5	5.5	0	1
2013	Pittsburgh	13	59	**28.5**	**11.0**	0	**4**
Total		52	179	66	29.5	0	6

== Awards and honors ==
NFL

- Super Bowl champion (LVI)
- 3× NFL Defensive Player of the Year (2017, 2018, 2020)
- 2× Sporting News NFL Player of the Year Award (2018, 2020)
- 6× Pro Football Focus Defensive Player of the Year (2015, 2016, 2018–2021)
- 4× Kansas City Committee of 101 NFC Defensive Player of the Year (2015, 2017, 2018, 2020)
- 2× PFWA NFL Defensive Player of the Year (2018, 2020)
- NFL Defensive Rookie of the Year (2014)
- 8× First-team All-Pro selection (2015–2021, 2023)
- 10× Pro Bowl selection (2014–2023)
- Deacon Jones Award (2018)
- PFWA All-Rookie Team (2014)
- NFL 2010s All-Decade Team
- Sporting News 2010s All-Decade Team
- Ranked No. 92 in the NFL Top 100 Players of 2015
- Ranked No. 14 in the NFL Top 100 Players of 2016
- Ranked No. 15 in the NFL Top 100 Players of 2017
- Ranked No. 7 in the NFL Top 100 Players of 2018
- Ranked No. 1 in the NFL Top 100 Players of 2019
- Ranked No. 3 in the NFL Top 100 Players of 2020
- Ranked No. 2 in the NFL Top 100 Players of 2021
- Ranked No. 2 in the NFL Top 100 Players of 2022
- Ranked No. 11 in the NFL Top 100 Players of 2023
- 3× NFC Defensive Player of the Month (2018 – October; 2018 – December; 2021 – December)
- 8× NFC Defensive Player of the Week (2015 – Week 1, Week 14; 2016 – Week 4; 2018 – Week 7, Week 16; 2019 – Week 11; 2020 – Week 5; 2021 – Week 14)
- Pro Football Hall of Fame All-Decade Team – 2010s

College

- ACC Defensive Player of the Year (2013)
- Bronko Nagurski Trophy (2013)
- Chuck Bednarik Award (2013)
- Lombardi Award (2013)
- Outland Trophy (2013)
- Second-team All-American (2011)
- Unanimous All-American (2013)
- College Football Hall of Fame (2026)

== Personal life ==
Donald's older brother, Archie Jr., was a star linebacker at Toledo who "bounced around the NFL as an undrafted free agent until retiring in 2012". The brothers, who shared bunk beds in their childhood, frequently thought about one day helping their parents retire, which became one of the driving forces in Aaron's career. On April 27, 2020, Donald revealed on Twitter that he had graduated from the University of Pittsburgh with a degree in communications.

In 2021, Donald and his wife Erica had a son. With his high school sweetheart Jaelynn Blakey, Donald also has a daughter born in 2013, and a son born in 2016. Donald and his wife established the Aaron Donald 99 Foundation, which is a non-profit organization focused on helping youth from underserved communities.
