= AP NFL Offensive Player of the Year =

American football award given by the Associated Press

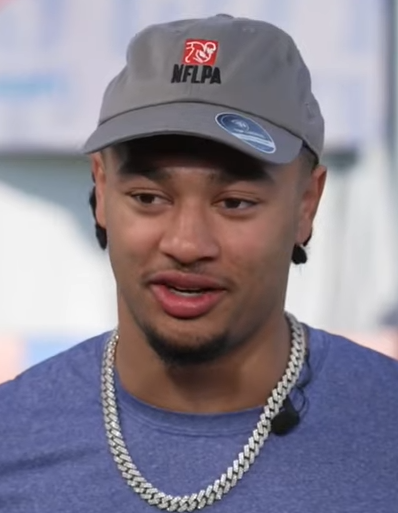
- Seattle Seahawks wide receiver Jaxon Smith-Njigba, 2025 recipient
- Awarded for: Offensive player of the year in the NFL
- Presented by: Associated Press

History
- First award: 1972
- Most wins: Earl Campbell, Marshall Faulk (3 each)
- Most recent: Jaxon Smith-Njigba

The AP NFL Offensive Player of the Year (OPOY) is an annual award presented by the Associated Press (AP) to the offensive player in the National Football League (NFL) deemed to have had the most outstanding season. The winner is chosen by votes from a nationwide panel of sportswriters who regularly follow the NFL. Marshall Faulk and Earl Campbell are the only players to have won the award three times, in three consecutive seasons. Jerry Rice, Barry Sanders, Terrell Davis, Tom Brady, Drew Brees, and Peyton Manning have each won it twice. Campbell is the only player to win the award as a rookie, doing so in 1978. Warren Moon and Priest Holmes are the only undrafted players to win the award. Manning is the only player to win the award with two different teams, doing so in 2004 with the Indianapolis Colts and in 2013 with the Denver Broncos. The most recent winner is wide receiver Jaxon Smith-Njigba of the Seattle Seahawks, who received it for the 2025 NFL season.

Every winner of the award has been either a running back or a quarterback, with the exception of wide receivers Jerry Rice, Michael Thomas, Cooper Kupp, Justin Jefferson, and Jaxon Smith-Njigba. Running backs have been awarded 26 times, followed by quarterbacks, with 20 awards. Of the 53 winners, 28 were also named the AP NFL Most Valuable Player in the same season. Since 2011, both awards have been given out at the annual NFL Honors ceremony along with other AP awards, including the Defensive Player of the Year and Rookie of the Year awards.

Players are often awarded after record-breaking or near-record-breaking offensive seasons. Running back O. J. Simpson won the award for 1973 after rushing for a record 2,003 yards, becoming the first NFL player to rush for 2,000 yards in a season. When his record was broken by Eric Dickerson in 1984, Dickerson placed second in voting behind quarterback Dan Marino, who that year was the first to pass for 5,000 yards in a season. Marino's 5,084 yards stood as the record for 27 years before being broken by Drew Brees in 2011, who won that season's award. In turn, 2013 winner Peyton Manning set league single-season records for passing yards (5,477) and passing touchdowns (55).

== Winners ==
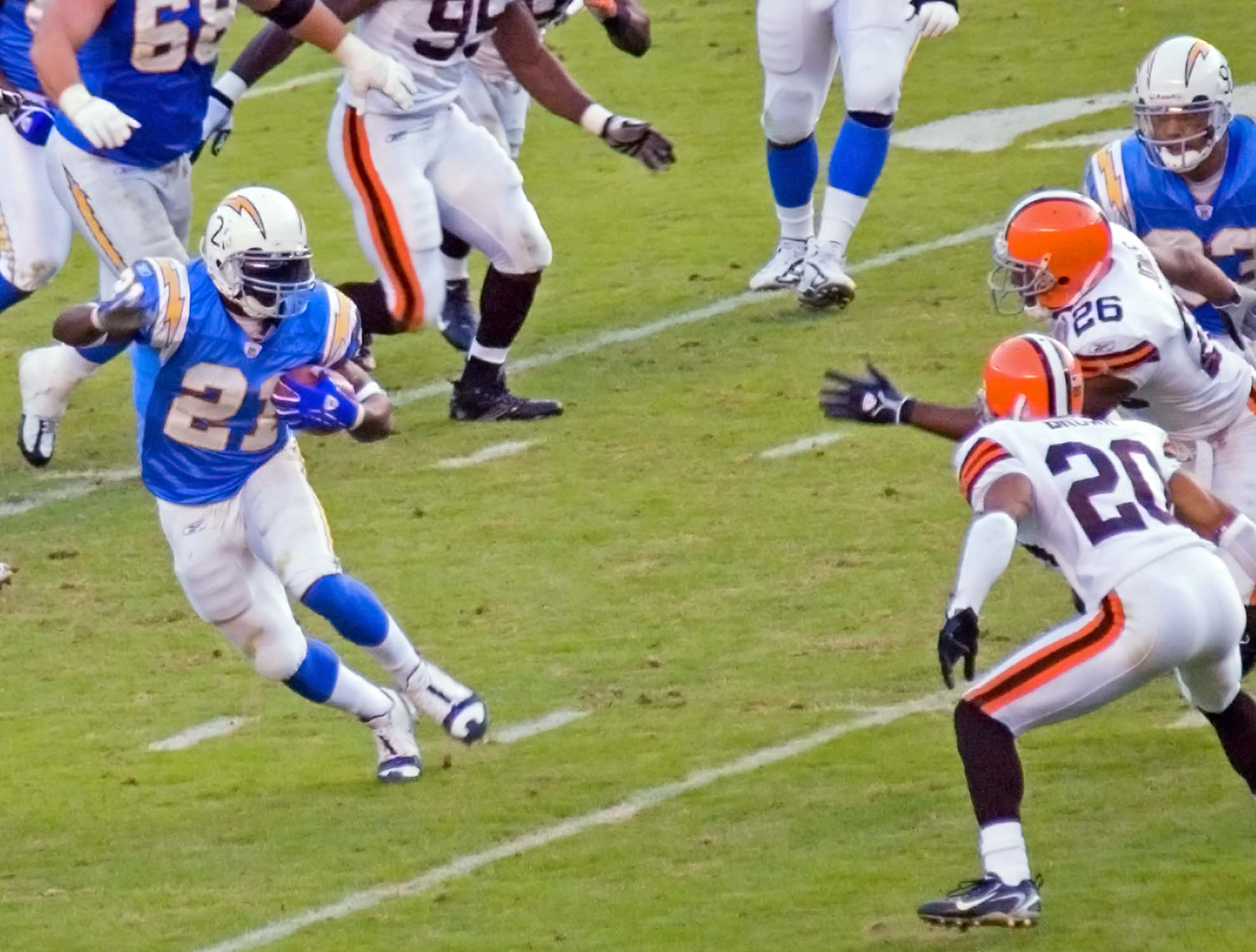
2006 winner LaDainian Tomlinson set NFL single-season records for rushing touchdowns (28), touchdowns from scrimmage (31), and points scored (186).

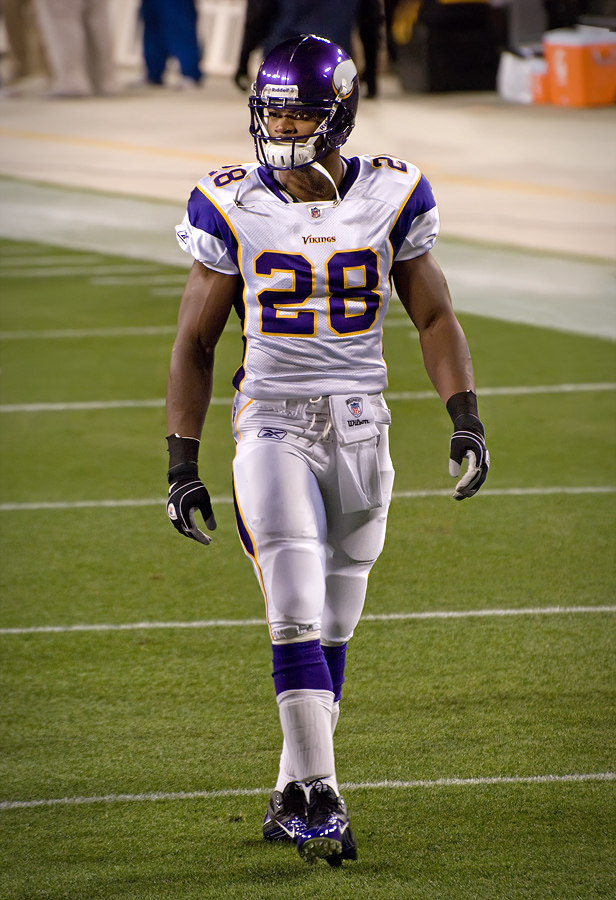
Adrian Peterson won the award in 2012 after rushing for 2,097 yards, the second-most all time by a player in a single season.

List of AP NFL Offensive Player of the Year winners
Season	Player	Position	Team	Ref.
1972	Larry Brown	Running back	Washington Redskins	
1973	O. J. Simpson	Running back	Buffalo Bills	
1974	Ken Stabler	Quarterback	Oakland Raiders	
1975	Fran Tarkenton	Quarterback	Minnesota Vikings	
1976	Bert Jones	Quarterback	Baltimore Colts	
1977	Walter Payton	Running back	Chicago Bears	
1978	Earl Campbell	Running back	Houston Oilers	
1979	Earl Campbell (2)	Running back	Houston Oilers	
1980	Earl Campbell (3)	Running back	Houston Oilers	
1981	Ken Anderson	Quarterback	Cincinnati Bengals	
1982	Dan Fouts	Quarterback	San Diego Chargers	
1983	Joe Theismann	Quarterback	Washington Redskins	
1984	Dan Marino	Quarterback	Miami Dolphins	
1985	Marcus Allen	Running back	Los Angeles Raiders	
1986	Eric Dickerson	Running back	Los Angeles Rams	
1987	Jerry Rice	Wide receiver	San Francisco 49ers	
1988	Roger Craig	Running back	San Francisco 49ers	
1989	Joe Montana	Quarterback	San Francisco 49ers	
1990	Warren Moon	Quarterback	Houston Oilers	
1991	Thurman Thomas	Running back	Buffalo Bills	
1992	Steve Young	Quarterback	San Francisco 49ers	
1993	Jerry Rice (2)	Wide receiver	San Francisco 49ers	
1994	Barry Sanders	Running back	Detroit Lions	
1995	Brett Favre	Quarterback	Green Bay Packers	
1996	Terrell Davis	Running back	Denver Broncos	
1997	Barry Sanders (2)	Running back	Detroit Lions	
1998	Terrell Davis (2)	Running back	Denver Broncos	
1999	Marshall Faulk	Running back	St. Louis Rams	
2000	Marshall Faulk (2)	Running back	St. Louis Rams	
2001	Marshall Faulk (3)	Running back	St. Louis Rams	
2002	Priest Holmes	Running back	Kansas City Chiefs	
2003	Jamal Lewis	Running back	Baltimore Ravens	
2004	Peyton Manning	Quarterback	Indianapolis Colts	
2005	Shaun Alexander	Running back	Seattle Seahawks	
2006	LaDainian Tomlinson	Running back	San Diego Chargers	
2007	Tom Brady	Quarterback	New England Patriots	
2008	Drew Brees	Quarterback	New Orleans Saints	
2009	Chris Johnson	Running back	Tennessee Titans	
2010	Tom Brady (2)	Quarterback	New England Patriots	
2011	Drew Brees (2)	Quarterback	New Orleans Saints	
2012	Adrian Peterson	Running back	Minnesota Vikings	
2013	Peyton Manning (2)	Quarterback	Denver Broncos	
2014	DeMarco Murray	Running back	Dallas Cowboys	
2015	Cam Newton	Quarterback	Carolina Panthers	
2016	Matt Ryan	Quarterback	Atlanta Falcons	
2017	Todd Gurley	Running back	Los Angeles Rams	
2018	Patrick Mahomes	Quarterback	Kansas City Chiefs	
2019	Michael Thomas	Wide receiver	New Orleans Saints	
2020	Derrick Henry	Running back	Tennessee Titans	
2021	Cooper Kupp	Wide receiver	Los Angeles Rams	
2022	Justin Jefferson	Wide receiver	Minnesota Vikings	
2023	Christian McCaffrey	Running back	San Francisco 49ers	
2024	Saquon Barkley	Running back	Philadelphia Eagles	
2025	Jaxon Smith-Njigba	Wide receiver	Seattle Seahawks	

== Multiple-time winners ==
List of multiple-time winners
Awards	Player	Team(s)	Years
3	Earl Campbell	Houston Oilers	1978, 1979, 1980
3	Marshall Faulk	St. Louis Rams	1999, 2000, 2001
2	Barry Sanders	Detroit Lions	1994, 1997
2	Drew Brees	New Orleans Saints	2008, 2011
2	Jerry Rice	San Francisco 49ers	1987, 1993
2	Peyton Manning	Indianapolis Colts (1) / Denver Broncos (1)	2004, 2013
2	Terrell Davis	Denver Broncos	1996, 1998
2	Tom Brady	New England Patriots	2007, 2010

== See also ==
- AP NFL Defensive Player of the Year
