= AP NFL Defensive Player of the Year =

American football award given by the Associated Press

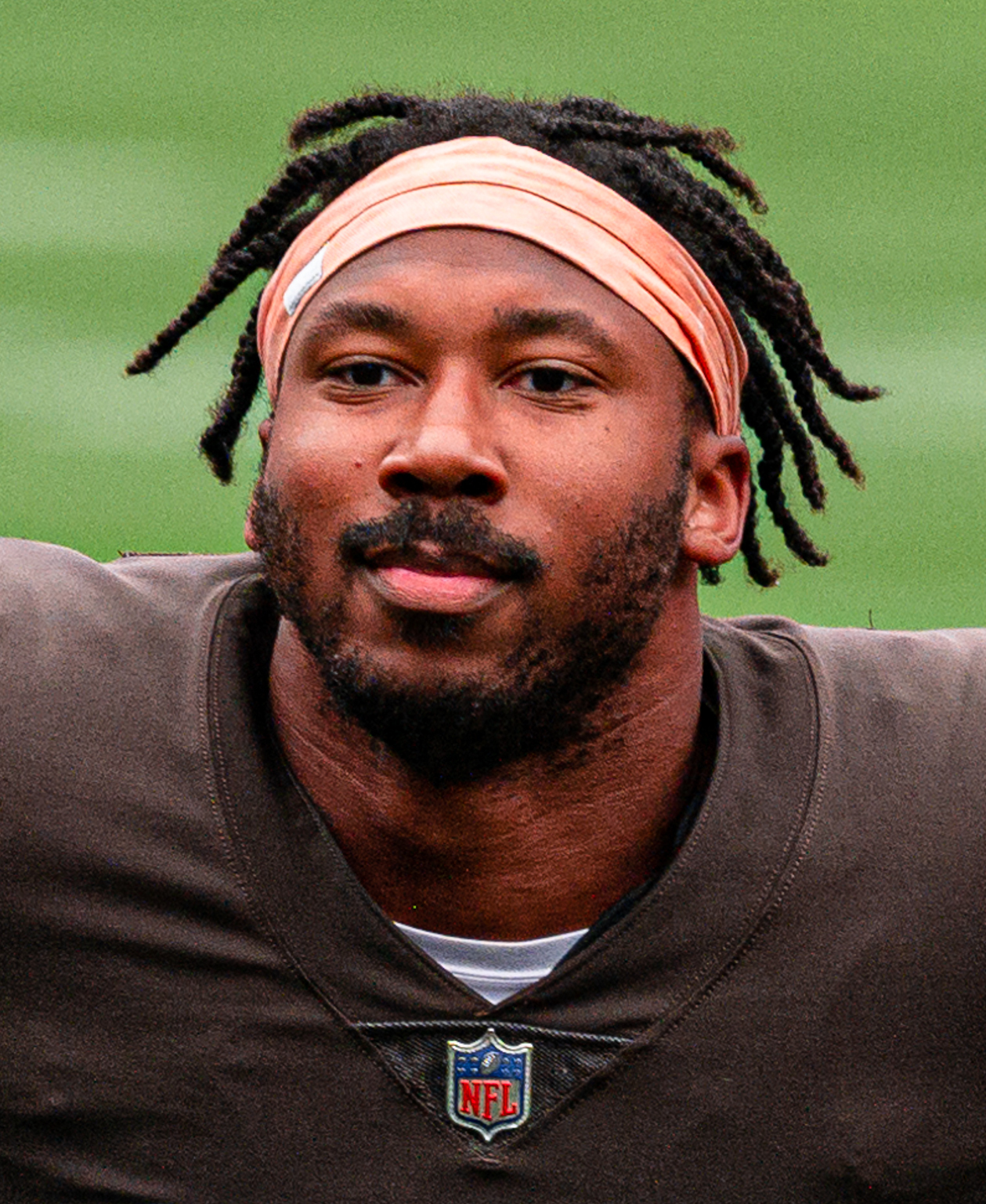
- Defensive end Myles Garrett, 2025 recipient
- Awarded for: Defensive player of the year in the NFL
- Presented by: Associated Press

History
- First award: 1971
- Most wins: Lawrence Taylor; J. J. Watt; Aaron Donald (3 each)
- Most recent: Myles Garrett

The AP NFL Defensive Player of the Year (DPOY) is an annual award presented by the Associated Press (AP) to the defensive player in the National Football League (NFL) deemed to have had the most outstanding season. It has been awarded since 1971. The winner is decided by votes from a panel of 50 AP sportswriters. Since 2011, the award has been presented at the annual NFL Honors ceremony the day before the Super Bowl, along with other AP awards, such as the AP NFL Offensive Player of the Year award, AP NFL Most Valuable Player award, and AP NFL Rookie of the Year award. The most recent winner is defensive end Myles Garrett, who won the award on the Cleveland Browns.

Lawrence Taylor, J. J. Watt, and Aaron Donald are the only three-time winners of the award. Joe Greene, Mike Singletary, Bruce Smith, Reggie White, Ray Lewis and Myles Garrett have each won it twice. Taylor is the only player to win the award as a rookie, doing so in 1981. In 2008, James Harrison became the only undrafted free agent to win the award. White is the only player to win the award with two different teams, winning in 1987 with the Philadelphia Eagles and again with the Green Bay Packers in 1998. J. J. Watt and Myles Garrett are the only players to win the award unanimously, both receiving 50 out of 50 first place votes.

As of the end of the 2024 NFL season, linebackers have won the award seventeen times, more than any other position. A defensive end has won fifteen times, followed by ten defensive tackles, seven cornerbacks, and five safeties. Only two winners of the AP Defensive Player of the Year award have also won the AP's Most Valuable Player award for the same season: defensive tackle Alan Page in 1971 for the Minnesota Vikings and linebacker Lawrence Taylor in 1986 for the New York Giants.

== Winners ==
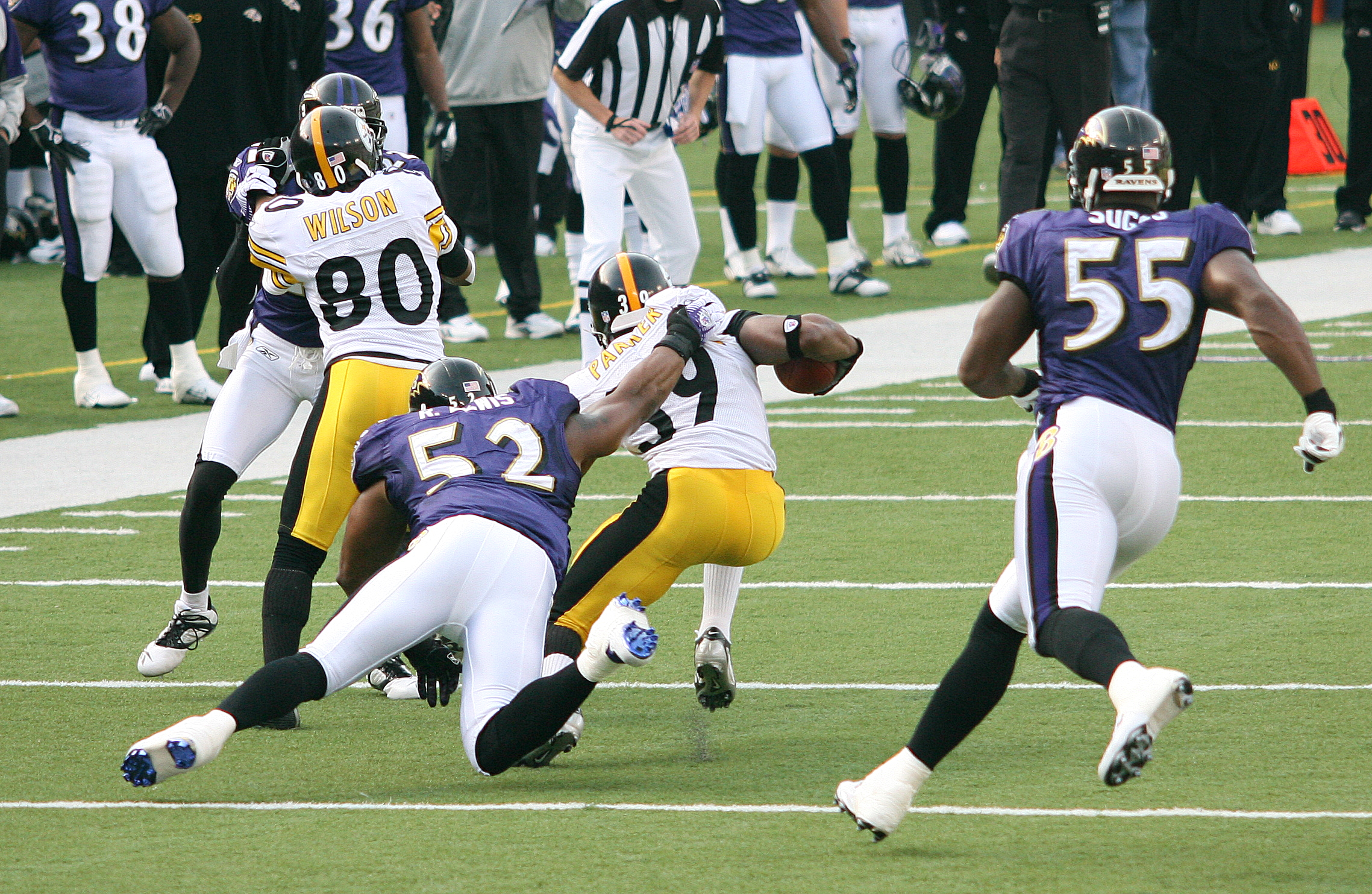
Ray Lewis (No. 52) and Terrell Suggs (No. 55) each won the award playing for the Baltimore Ravens.

Season	Player	Position	Team	Ref.
1971	Alan Page	DT	Minnesota	
1972	Joe Greene	DT	Pittsburgh	
1973	Dick Anderson	S	Miami	
1974	Joe Greene	DT	Pittsburgh	
1975	Mel Blount	CB	Pittsburgh	
1976	Jack Lambert	LB	Pittsburgh	
1977	Harvey Martin	DE	Dallas	
1978	Randy Gradishar	LB	Denver	
1979	Lee Roy Selmon	DE	Tampa Bay	
1980	Lester Hayes	CB	Oakland	
1981	Lawrence Taylor	LB	NY Giants	
1982	Lawrence Taylor	LB	NY Giants	
1983	Doug Betters	DE	Miami	
1984	Kenny Easley	S	Seattle	
1985	Mike Singletary	LB	Chicago	
1986	Lawrence Taylor	LB	NY Giants	
1987	Reggie White	DE	Philadelphia	
1988	Mike Singletary	LB	Chicago	
1989	Keith Millard	DT	Minnesota	
1990	Bruce Smith	DE	Buffalo	
1991	Pat Swilling	LB	New Orleans	
1992	Cortez Kennedy	DT	Seattle	
1993	Rod Woodson	CB	Pittsburgh	
1994	Deion Sanders	CB	San Francisco	
1995	Bryce Paup	LB	Buffalo	
1996	Bruce Smith	DE	Buffalo	
1997	Dana Stubblefield	DT	San Francisco	
1998	Reggie White	DE	Green Bay	
1999	Warren Sapp	DT	Tampa Bay	
2000	Ray Lewis	LB	Baltimore	
2001	Michael Strahan	DE	NY Giants	
2002	Derrick Brooks	LB	Tampa Bay	
2003	Ray Lewis	LB	Baltimore	
2004	Ed Reed	S	Baltimore	
2005	Brian Urlacher	LB	Chicago	
2006	Jason Taylor	DE	Miami	
2007	Bob Sanders	S	Indianapolis	
2008	James Harrison	LB	Pittsburgh	
2009	Charles Woodson	CB	Green Bay	
2010	Troy Polamalu	S	Pittsburgh	
2011	Terrell Suggs	LB	Baltimore	
2012	J. J. Watt	DE	Houston	
2013	Luke Kuechly	LB	Carolina	
2014	J. J. Watt	DE	Houston	
2015	J. J. Watt	DE	Houston	
2016	Khalil Mack	DE	Oakland	
2017	Aaron Donald	DT	LA Rams	
2018	Aaron Donald	DT	LA Rams	
2019	Stephon Gilmore	CB	New England	
2020	Aaron Donald	DT	LA Rams	
2021	T. J. Watt	LB	Pittsburgh	
2022	Nick Bosa	DE	San Francisco	
2023	Myles Garrett	DE	Cleveland	
2024	Patrick Surtain II	CB	Denver	
2025	Myles Garrett	DE	Cleveland	

== Multiple-time winners ==
List of multiple-time winners
Awards	Player	Team(s)	Years
3	Aaron Donald	Los Angeles Rams	2017, 2018, 2020
3	Lawrence Taylor	New York Giants	1981, 1982, 1986
3	J. J. Watt	Houston Texans	2012, 2014, 2015
2	Myles Garrett	Cleveland Browns	2023, 2025
2	Joe Greene	Pittsburgh Steelers	1972, 1974
2	Ray Lewis	Baltimore Ravens	2000, 2003
2	Mike Singletary	Chicago Bears	1985, 1988
2	Bruce Smith	Buffalo Bills	1990, 1996
2	Reggie White	Green Bay Packers (1) / Philadelphia Eagles (1)	1987, 1998

== See also ==
- AP NFL Offensive Player of the Year
