= AP NFL Most Valuable Player =

American football award given by the Associated Press

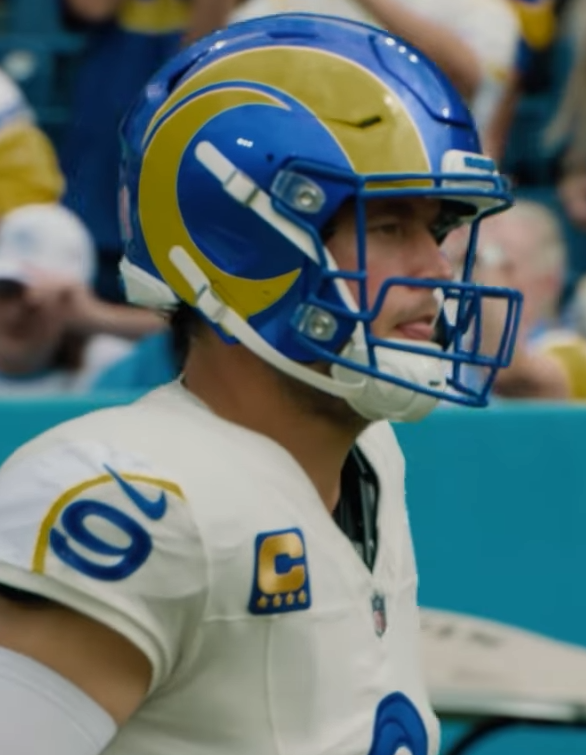
- Los Angeles Rams quarterback Matthew Stafford, 2025 recipient
- Awarded for: Most valuable player in the NFL
- Presented by: Associated Press

History
- First award: 1957
- Most wins: Peyton Manning (5)
- Most recent: Matthew Stafford (1)

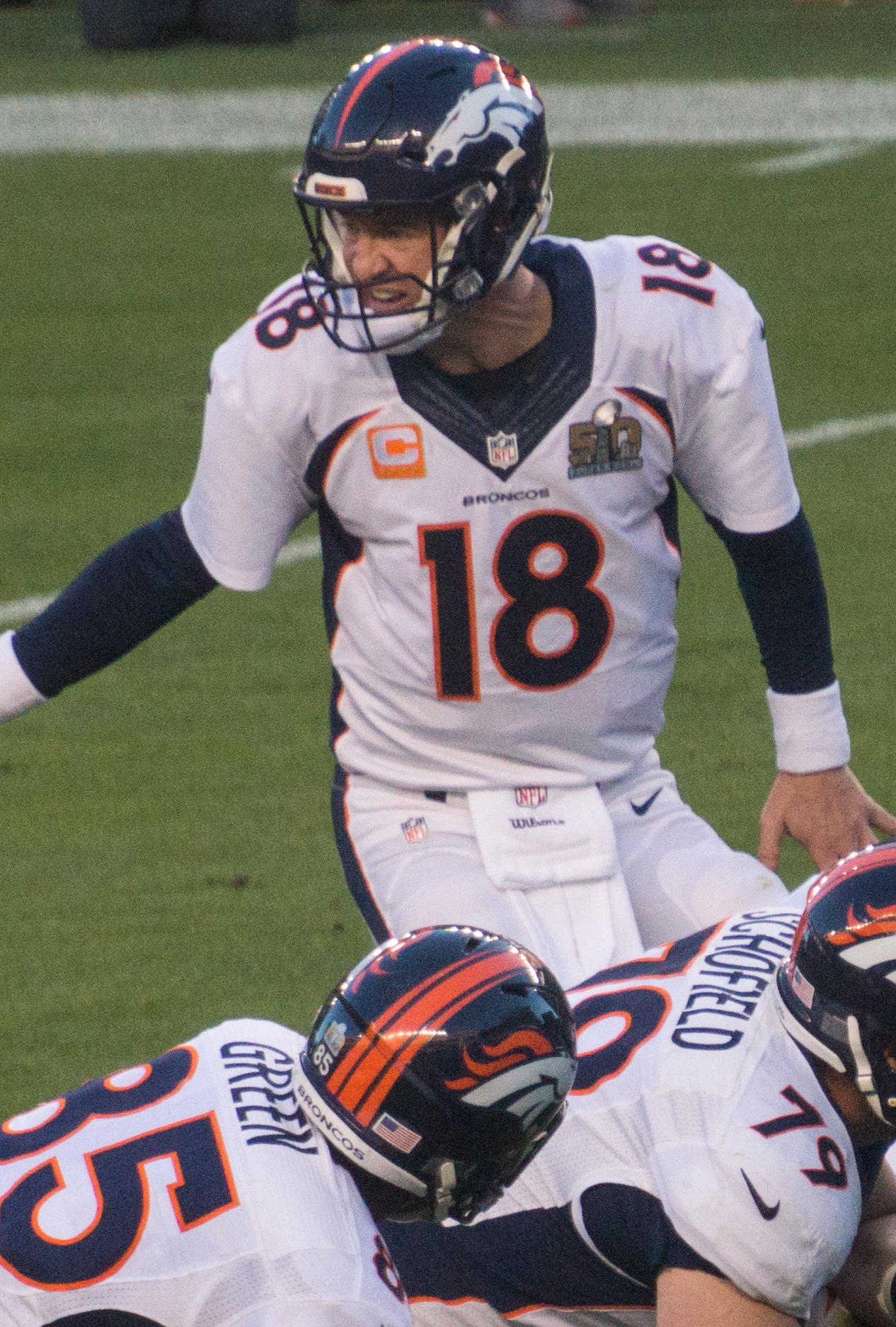
Peyton Manning won the award a record five times.

The AP NFL Most Valuable Player (MVP) is an annual award presented by the Associated Press (AP) to a player in the National Football League (NFL) adjudged to have been the most valuable in that year's regular season. While there have been many selectors of NFL MVPs in the past, today the MVP award presented by the AP is considered the de facto official NFL MVP award and the most prestigious. Since 2012, the NFL has held the annual NFL Honors ceremony to recognize the winner of each year's AP MVP award, along with other AP awards, such as the AP NFL Offensive Player of the Year and AP NFL Defensive Player of the Year. The most recent winner is quarterback Matthew Stafford of the Los Angeles Rams.

The AP has presented an award recognizing the NFL's top player since 1957. The award is voted upon by a panel of 50 sportswriters at the end of the regular season, before the playoffs, though the results are not announced to the public until the day before the Super Bowl. The sportswriters chosen regularly follow the NFL, and remain mostly consistent from year to year. They are chosen based on expertise and are independent of the league itself. Voters for the award have included Troy Aikman of Fox Sports; Cris Collinsworth and Tony Dungy of NBC Sports; and Herm Edwards of ESPN. Only two players in the history of the award have won it unanimously: New England Patriots quarterback Tom Brady in 2010 and Baltimore Ravens quarterback Lamar Jackson in 2019. Peyton Manning, who played quarterback for the Indianapolis Colts and Denver Broncos, holds the record for most career MVP awards, with five.

Due to voters' tendency to favor offensive positions (mostly the quarterback and sometimes the running back), the award has been overwhelmingly dominated by offensive players; of the 54 undisputed winners, 54 played an offensive position: 50 quarterbacks and 4 running backs. Two defensive players have won the award: Alan Page in 1971 as a defensive tackle, and Lawrence Taylor as a linebacker in 1986. The sole special teams player to be named AP NFL MVP was Mark Moseley, who won as a placekicker in 1982.

Thirteen awardees also won the Super Bowl (or NFL Championship Game prior to 1966) in the same season. However, this did not occur from 1997 to 2021. During that span, nine AP NFL MVPs have led their team to the Super Bowl and were defeated each time. This has led to tongue-in-cheek claims in recent years that there is a "curse" preventing the awardee's team from winning the Super Bowl.

Six NFL franchises have not produced an MVP, the New York Jets, Houston Texans, Jacksonville Jaguars, Chicago/St. Louis/Phoenix/Arizona Cardinals, New Orleans Saints, and the Tampa Bay Buccaneers. (Note: While the New York Jets have never had a player win the NFL MVP award, Joe Namath won the American Football League Most Valuable Player award in 1968.)

The Green Bay Packers have the most overall winners with ten; if including disputed awards (see below), the Colts would be tied with ten. The Green Bay Packers also have the most unique winners with five players winning the award.

== Discrepancies ==
The AP has presented an award recognizing the NFL's top player since the 1957 season, although the pre-1961 awardees are recognized in the Official NFL Record and Fact Book as winning the AP's "NFL Most Outstanding Player" award, and the 1962 winner was recognized as the AP's "Player of the Year". The AP considers 1961 to be the first year in which it presented a "Most Valuable Player" award. Thus there are numerous inconsistencies among sources regarding each of the first four awards, and whether or not the winners are included in the overall list of AP MVP winners at all. The discrepancies include 1958's winner being either Jim Brown or Gino Marchetti; the 1959 winner as Johnny Unitas or Charlie Conerly; and whether or not Norm Van Brocklin shared the award in 1960 with Joe Schmidt.

== MVP Super Bowl curse ==
In recent years, if a player that won the MVP makes it to the Super Bowl, the MVP often loses the Super Bowl in the year they won the MVP. That includes, Kurt Warner in 2001, Rich Gannon in 2002, Shaun Alexander in 2005, Tom Brady in 2007, Peyton Manning in 2009 and 2013, Cam Newton in 2015, Matt Ryan in 2016, and Tom Brady in 2017.

Eleven players have won the Super Bowl and MVP in the same season: Bart Starr in 1966, Terry Bradshaw in 1978, Mark Moseley in 1982, Lawrence Taylor in 1986, Joe Montana in 1989, Emmitt Smith in 1993, Steve Young in 1994, Brett Favre in 1996, Terrell Davis in 1998, Kurt Warner in 1999, and Patrick Mahomes in 2022. In these eleven cases, all but four regular season MVP winners were also the Super Bowl MVP for their respective games - with Moseley, Taylor, Favre and Davis not completing the duplicate MVP year. From Warner's MVP and Super Bowl win in the same year in 1999, no NFL MVP would become a Super Bowl champion in the same year for 23 years until 2022, when Patrick Mahomes broke the MVP Super Bowl curse at Super Bowl LVII.

== Winners ==
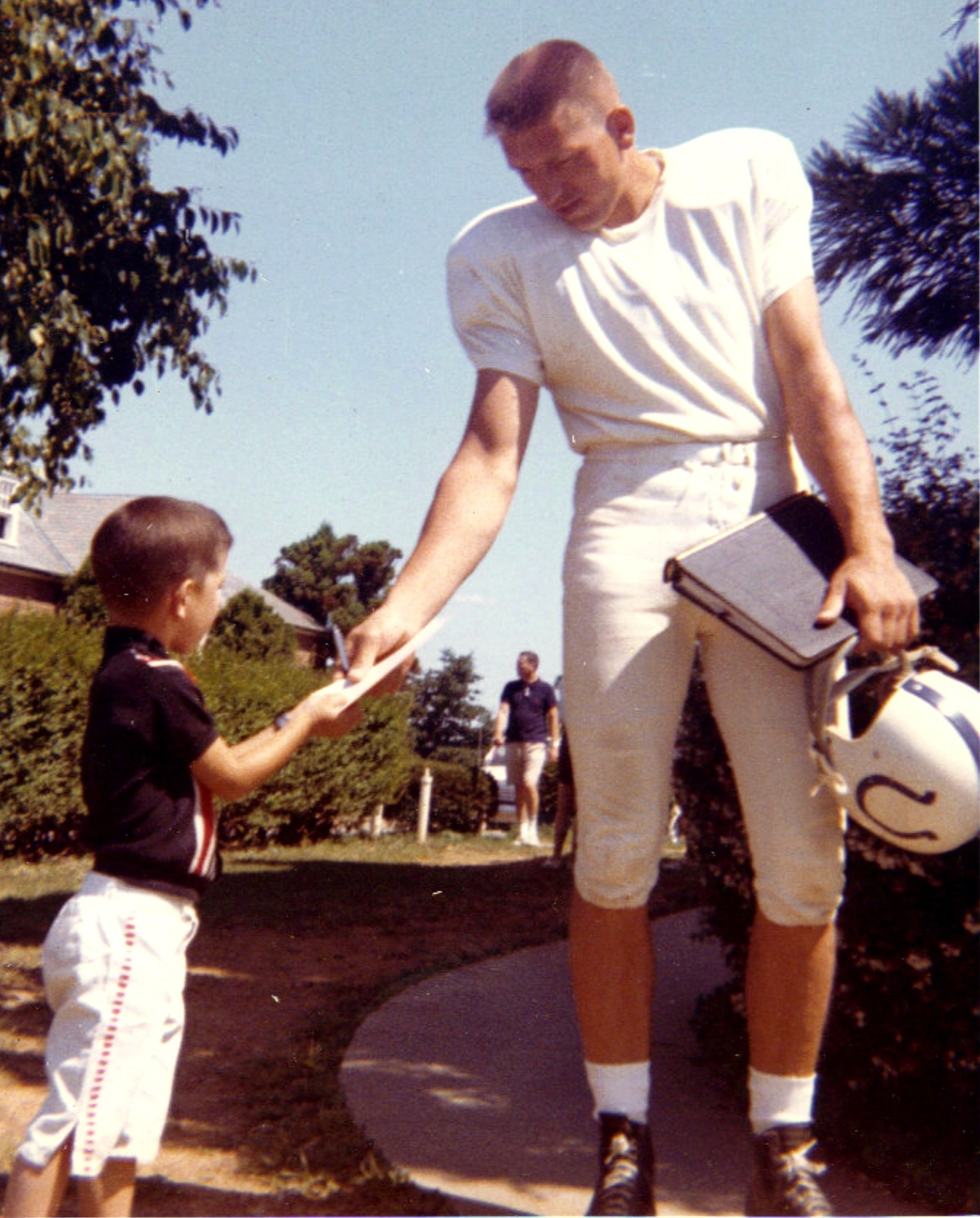
Johnny Unitas won three AP NFL MVP awards as quarterback of the Baltimore Colts.

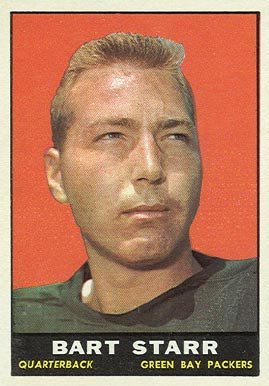
Quarterback Bart Starr was awarded in 1966 after passing for 2,257 yards and 14 touchdowns and leading the Green Bay Packers to Super Bowl I.

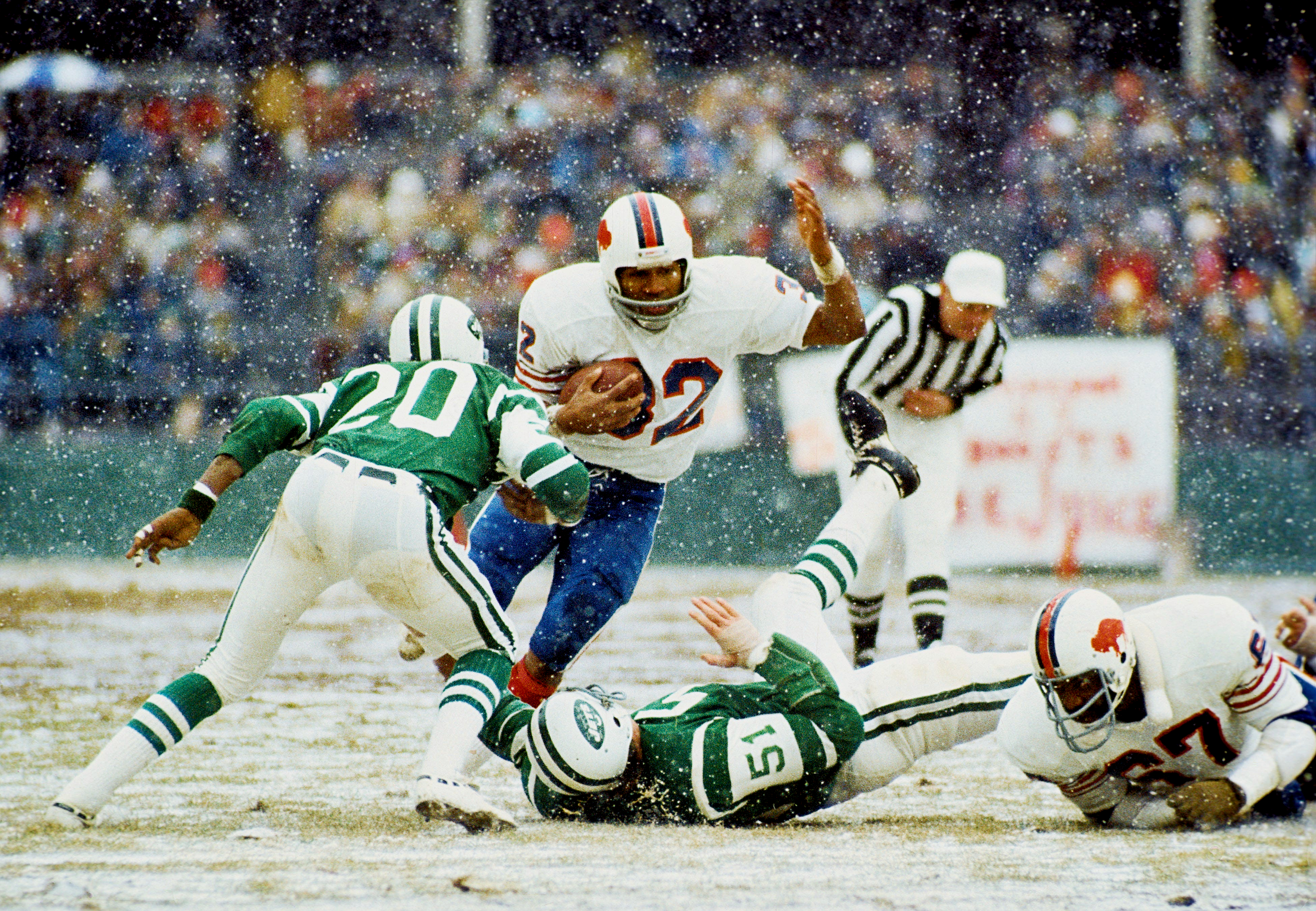
Running back O. J. Simpson became the first player to rush for 2,000 yards in a season en route to winning the 1973 award with the Buffalo Bills.

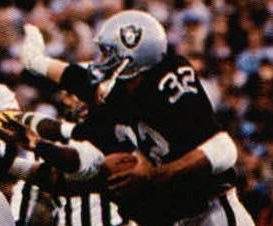
Running back Marcus Allen set an NFL record with 2,314 yards from scrimmage in 1985 for the Los Angeles Raiders.

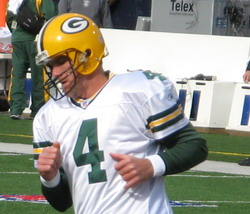
Quarterback Brett Favre won three straight awards from 1995 to 1997 with the Green Bay Packers.

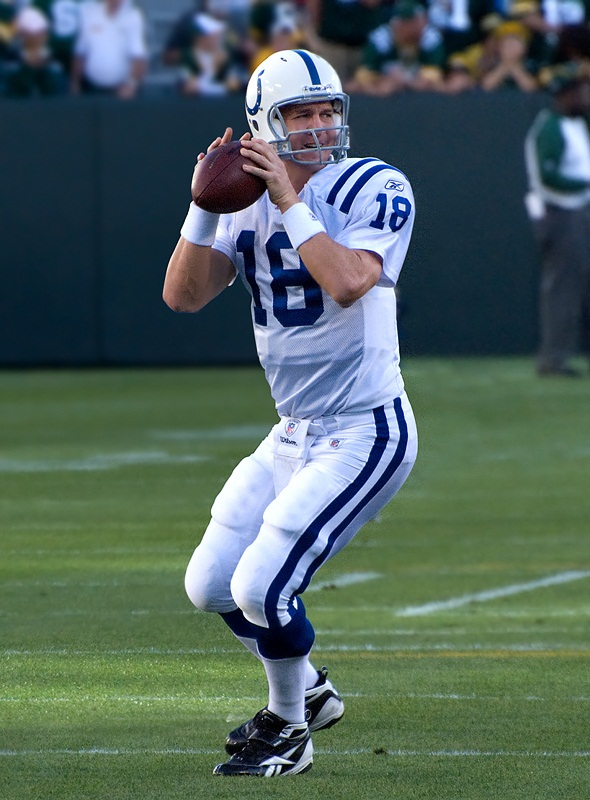
Quarterback Peyton Manning won four awards with the Indianapolis Colts and one with the Denver Broncos. He is the only player to win an MVP award with two teams.

Legend
Winner received all available votes or all available first-place votes
Winner received at least 90% of available votes or of available first-place votes

List of AP NFL Most Valuable Player winners
Season	Player	Position	Team	Votes	Ref.
1957	Jim Brown	Fullback	Cleveland Browns	14 of 36 (39%)	
1958	Jim Brown (2)	Fullback	Cleveland Browns	22 of 41 (54%)	
1959	Johnny Unitas	Quarterback	Baltimore Colts	20 of 37 (54%)	
1960	Norm Van Brocklin	Quarterback	Philadelphia Eagles	Not released	
1961	Paul Hornung	Running back	Green Bay Packers	Not released	
1962	Jim Taylor	Running back	Green Bay Packers	19 of 40 (48%)	
1963	Y. A. Tittle	Quarterback	New York Giants	33 of 40 (83%)	
1964	Johnny Unitas (2)	Quarterback	Baltimore Colts	32 of 40 (80%)	
1965	Jim Brown (3)	Fullback	Cleveland Browns	34 of 42 (81%)	
1966	Bart Starr	Quarterback	Green Bay Packers	19 of 40 (48%)	
1967	Johnny Unitas (3)	Quarterback	Baltimore Colts	40 of 47 (81%)	
1968	Earl Morrall	Quarterback	Baltimore Colts	33 of 46 (81%)	
1969	Roman Gabriel	Quarterback	Los Angeles Rams	21 1/3 of 48 (44%)	
1970	John Brodie	Quarterback	San Francisco 49ers	33 of 78 (42%)	
1971	Alan Page	Defensive tackle	Minnesota Vikings	16 of 60 (21%)	
1972	Larry Brown	Running back	Washington Redskins	45 of 75 (40%)	
1973	O. J. Simpson	Running back	Buffalo Bills	74 of 78 (95%)	
1974	Ken Stabler	Quarterback	Oakland Raiders	36 of 78 (46%)	
1975	Fran Tarkenton	Quarterback	Minnesota Vikings	Not released	
1976	Bert Jones	Quarterback	Baltimore Colts	41 of 84 (49%)	
1977	Walter Payton	Running back	Chicago Bears	57 of 84 (68%)	
1978	Terry Bradshaw	Quarterback	Pittsburgh Steelers	36 of 84 (43%)	
1979	Earl Campbell	Running back	Houston Oilers	34 of 84 (41%)	
1980	Brian Sipe	Quarterback	Cleveland Browns	47 of 84 (56%)	
1981	Ken Anderson	Quarterback	Cincinnati Bengals	46 of 84 (55%)	
1982	Mark Moseley	Placekicker	Washington Redskins	35 of 84 (42%)	
1983	Joe Theismann	Quarterback	Washington Redskins	58 of 84 (69%)	
1984	Dan Marino	Quarterback	Miami Dolphins	52 of 84 (62%)	
1985	Marcus Allen	Running back	Los Angeles Raiders	33 of 84 (39%)	
1986	Lawrence Taylor	Linebacker	New York Giants	41 of 84 (49%)	
1987	John Elway	Quarterback	Denver Broncos	36 of 84 (43%)	
1988	Boomer Esiason	Quarterback	Cincinnati Bengals	31 of 78 (40%)	
1989	Joe Montana	Quarterback	San Francisco 49ers	62 of 70 (89%)	
1990	Joe Montana (2)	Quarterback	San Francisco 49ers	26 of 80 (33%)	
1991	Thurman Thomas	Running back	Buffalo Bills	39 of 82 (48%)	
1992	Steve Young	Quarterback	San Francisco 49ers	56 of 80 (70%)	
1993	Emmitt Smith	Running back	Dallas Cowboys	26 of 81 (32%)	
1994	Steve Young (2)	Quarterback	San Francisco 49ers	74 of 98 (75%)	
1995	Brett Favre	Quarterback	Green Bay Packers	69 of 88 (78%)	
1996	Brett Favre (2)	Quarterback	Green Bay Packers	52 of 93 (56%)	
1997	Brett Favre (3) Barry Sanders	Quarterback; Running back	Green Bay Packers; Detroit Lions	18 of 48 (38%)	
1998	Terrell Davis	Running back	Denver Broncos	25 of 47 (53%)	
1999	Kurt Warner	Quarterback	St. Louis Rams	33 of 50 (66%)	
2000	Marshall Faulk	Running back	St. Louis Rams	24 of 50 (48%)	
2001	Kurt Warner (2)	Quarterback	St. Louis Rams	21 1/2 of 50 (43%)	
2002	Rich Gannon	Quarterback	Oakland Raiders	19 of 48 (40%)	
2003	Peyton Manning Steve McNair	Quarterback	Indianapolis Colts; Tennessee Titans	16 of 50 (32%)	
2004	Peyton Manning (2)	Quarterback	Indianapolis Colts	47 of 48 (98%)	
2005	Shaun Alexander	Running back	Seattle Seahawks	19 of 50 (38%)	
2006	LaDainian Tomlinson	Running back	San Diego Chargers	44 of 50 (88%)	
2007	Tom Brady	Quarterback	New England Patriots	49 of 50 (98%)	
2008	Peyton Manning (3)	Quarterback	Indianapolis Colts	32 of 50 (64%)	
2009	Peyton Manning (4)	Quarterback	Indianapolis Colts	39 1/2 of 50 (79%)	
2010	Tom Brady (2)	Quarterback	New England Patriots	50 of 50 (100%)	
2011	Aaron Rodgers	Quarterback	Green Bay Packers	48 of 50 (96%)	
2012	Adrian Peterson	Running back	Minnesota Vikings	30 1/2 of 50 (61%)	
2013	Peyton Manning (5)	Quarterback	Denver Broncos	49 of 50 (98%)	
2014	Aaron Rodgers (2)	Quarterback	Green Bay Packers	31 of 50 (62%)	
2015	Cam Newton	Quarterback	Carolina Panthers	48 of 50 (96%)	
2016	Matt Ryan	Quarterback	Atlanta Falcons	25 of 50 (50%)	
2017	Tom Brady (3)	Quarterback	New England Patriots	40 of 50 (80%)	
2018	Patrick Mahomes	Quarterback	Kansas City Chiefs	41 of 50 (82%)	
2019	Lamar Jackson	Quarterback	Baltimore Ravens	50 of 50 (100%)	
2020	Aaron Rodgers (3)	Quarterback	Green Bay Packers	44 of 50 (88%)	
2021	Aaron Rodgers (4)	Quarterback	Green Bay Packers	39 of 50 (78%)	
2022	Patrick Mahomes (2)	Quarterback	Kansas City Chiefs	48 of 50 (96%) (Note: Beginning with the 2022 season, AP voters began filling out a ranked MVP ballot of five players. Mahomes received 48 first-place votes and two second-place votes, for a total of 490 out of 500 potential points.)	
2023	Lamar Jackson (2)	Quarterback	Baltimore Ravens	49 of 50 (98%) (Note: Jackson received 49 first-place votes and one third-place vote, for a total of 493 out of 500 potential points.)	
2024	Josh Allen	Quarterback	Buffalo Bills	27 of 49 (55%) (Note: Allen received 27 first-place votes, 21 second-place votes and one third-place vote, for a total of 378 out of 490 potential points.)	
2025	Matthew Stafford	Quarterback	Los Angeles Rams	24 of 50 (48%) (Note: Stafford earned a total of 366 out of 490 potential points, including 24 first-place votes.)	

== Multiple-time winners ==
List of multiple-time winners
Awards	Player	Team(s)	Years	Hall of Fame induction
5	Peyton Manning	Indianapolis Colts	2003, 2004, 2008, 2009	2021
5	Peyton Manning	Denver Broncos	2013	2021
4	Aaron Rodgers	Green Bay Packers	2011, 2014, 2020, 2021	Active
3	Jim Brown	Cleveland Browns	1957, 1958, 1965	1971
3	Johnny Unitas	Baltimore Colts	1959, 1964, 1967	1979
3	Brett Favre	Green Bay Packers	1995, 1996, 1997	2016
3	Tom Brady	New England Patriots	2007, 2010, 2017	Eligible in 2028
2	Joe Montana	San Francisco 49ers	1989, 1990	2000
2	Steve Young	San Francisco 49ers	1992, 1994	2005
2	Kurt Warner	St. Louis Rams	1999, 2001	2017
2	Patrick Mahomes	Kansas City Chiefs	2018, 2022	Active
2	Lamar Jackson	Baltimore Ravens	2019, 2023	Active

== See also ==
- List of NFL MVP awards
- AP NFL Offensive Player of the Year
- AP NFL Defensive Player of the Year
