= Alec Baldwin filmography =

List of credits for American actor Alec Baldwin

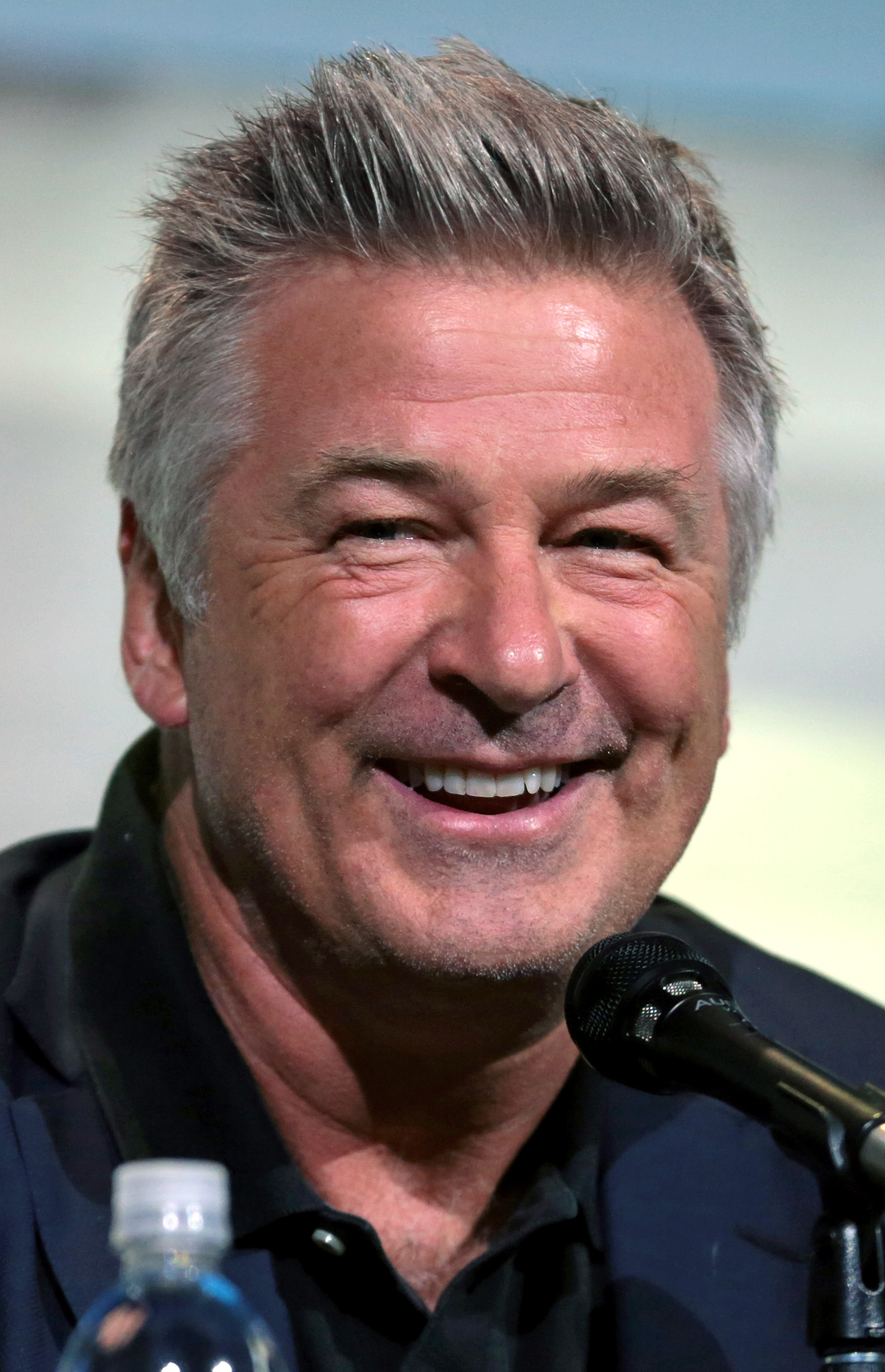
Alec Baldwin in 2016

Alec Baldwin's filmography includes the year the film was/will be released, the name of his character and other related notes. There is also a list of his appearances on TV series, video games and documentaries, as well as stage. A member of the Baldwin family, he is the eldest of the four Baldwin brothers, all actors. Baldwin first gained recognition by appearing on the sixth and seventh seasons of primetime CBS soap opera Knots Landing in the role of Joshua Rush, the half-brother of long-standing character Valene Ewing (Joan Van Ark).

In his early career, he played both leading and supporting roles in a variety of films such as Tim Burton's Beetlejuice (1988), Mike Nichols' Working Girl (1988), Jonathan Demme's Married to the Mob (1988), and Oliver Stone's Talk Radio (1988). He gained attention for his performances in Glengarry Glen Ross (1992), and as Jack Ryan in The Hunt for Red October (1990). Since then he has worked with such notable directors such as Woody Allen in Alice (1990), To Rome with Love (2012), and Blue Jasmine (2013), Spike Lee in BlacKkKlansman (2018), and Martin Scorsese in The Aviator (2004) and The Departed (2006). His performance in the 2003 drama The Cooler garnered him a nomination for the Academy Award for Best Supporting Actor.

From 2006 to 2013, Baldwin starred as Jack Donaghy on the critically acclaimed NBC sitcom 30 Rock starring alongside Tina Fey. He won many accolades for his performance winning two Primetime Emmy Awards, three Golden Globe Awards, and seven Screen Actors Guild Awards for his work on the show, making him the male performer with the most SAG Awards.

Baldwin co-starred alongside Tom Cruise in Mission: Impossible – Rogue Nation and Mission: Impossible – Fallout, respectively the fifth and sixth installments of the Mission: Impossible series. He is also a columnist for The Huffington Post. From 2016 to 2021, he was the host of Match Game. He has received worldwide attention and acclaim for his portrayal of Donald Trump on the sketch series Saturday Night Live, both during the 2016 U.S. presidential election and following the inauguration, a role for which he won a Primetime Emmy in 2017.

== Film ==
Year	Title	Role	Director	Notes
1987	Forever, Lulu	Buck	Amos Kollek	
1988	She's Having a Baby	Davis McDonald	John Hughes	
1988	Beetlejuice	Adam Maitland	Tim Burton	
1988	Married to the Mob	Frank de Marco	Jonathan Demme	
1988	Working Girl	Mick Dugan	Mike Nichols	
1988	Talk Radio	Dan	Oliver Stone	
1989	Great Balls of Fire!	Jimmy Swaggart	Jim McBride	
1990	The Hunt for Red October	Jack Ryan	John McTiernan	
1990	Miami Blues	Frederick J. Frenger Jr.	George Armitage	
1990	Alice	Ed	Woody Allen	
1991	The Marrying Man	Charley Pearl	Jerry Rees	
1992	Prelude to a Kiss	Peter Hoskins	Norman Rene	
1992	Glengarry Glen Ross	Blake	James Foley	
1993	Malice	Dr. Jed Hill	Harold Becker	
1994	The Getaway	Carter 'Doc' McCoy	Roger Donaldson	
1994	The Shadow	Lamont Cranston / The Shadow	Russell Mulcahy	
1995	Two Bits	Narrator (voice)	James Foley	
1996	The Juror	Mark Cordell/The Teacher	Brian Gibson	
1996	Heaven's Prisoners	Dave Robicheaux	Phil Joanou	Also executive producer
1996	Ghosts of Mississippi	Bobby DeLaughter	Rob Reiner	
1997	The Edge	Robert Green	Lee Tamahori	
1998	Thick as Thieves	Mackin	Scott Sanders	
1998	Mercury Rising	Lt. Col. Nicholas Kudrow	Harold Becker	
1999	The Confession	Roy Bleakie	David Jones	
1999	Notting Hill	Jeff King	Roger Michell	Uncredited
1999	Outside Providence	Old Man Dunphy	Michael Corrente	
1999	Scout's Honor	Todd Fitter	Neil Leifer	Short film
2000	The Acting Class	Himself	Jill Hennessy	
2000	Thomas and the Magic Railroad	Mr. Conductor	Britt Allcroft	
2000	State and Main	Bob Barrenger	David Mamet	Also executive producer
2001	Pearl Harbor	Lt. Col. James Doolittle	Michael Bay	
2001	Cats & Dogs	Butch (voice)	Lawrence Guterman	first voice role
2001	Final Fantasy: The Spirits Within	Capt. Gray Edwards (voice)	Hironobu Sakaguchi	
2001	The Royal Tenenbaums	Narrator (voice)	Wes Anderson	
2002	The Adventures of Pluto Nash	Michael Zoroaster Marucci	Ron Underwood	Uncredited
2003	The Cooler	Sheldon "Shelly" Kaplow	Wayne Kramer	
2003	The Cat in the Hat	Lawrence "Larry" Quinn	Bo Welch	
2003	Brighter Days	Himself	Godofredo Astudillo	Short film
2004	Along Came Polly	Stan Indursky	John Hamburg	
2004	The Aviator	Juan Trippe	Martin Scorsese	
2004	The SpongeBob SquarePants Movie	Dennis the Hitman (voice)	Stephen Hillenburg	
2004	The Last Shot	Joe Devine	Jeff Nathanson	
2005	Elizabethtown	Phil DeVoss	Cameron Crowe	
2005	Fun with Dick and Jane	Jack McCallister	Dean Parisot	
2006	Mini's First Time	Martin Tennan	Nick Guthe	
2006	The Departed	Capt. George Ellerby	Martin Scorsese	
2006	Running with Scissors	Norman Burroughs	Ryan Murphy	
2006	The Good Shepherd	Sam Murach	Robert De Niro	
2007	Suburban Girl	Archie Knox	Marc Klein	
2007	Brooklyn Rules	Caesar Manganaro	Michael Corrente	
2007	Shortcut to Happiness	Jabez Stone	Himself	Also director and producer
2008	My Best Friend's Girl	Professor Turner	Howard Deutch	
2008	Madagascar: Escape 2 Africa	Makunga the Lion (voice)	Eric Darnell & Tom McGrath	
2008	Lymelife	Mickey Bartlett	Derick Martini	Also producer
2009	My Sister's Keeper	Campbell Alexander	Nick Cassavettes	
2009	It's Complicated	Jacob Adler	Nancy Meyers	
2011	Hick	Beau	Derick Martini	
2012	Rock of Ages	Dennis Dupree	Adam Shankman	
2012	To Rome with Love	John	Woody Allen	
2012	Rise of the Guardians	Santa Claus (voice)	Peter Ramsey	
2013	Blue Jasmine	Harold "Hal" Francis	Woody Allen	
2014	Torrente 5: Operación Eurovegas	John Marshall	Santiago Segura	
2014	Still Alice	Dr. John Howland	Richard Glatzer	
2015	Aloha	General Dixon	Cameron Crowe	
2015	Mission: Impossible – Rogue Nation	Alan Hunley	Christopher McQuarrie	
2015	Concussion	Dr. Julian Balies	Peter Landesman	
2016	Back in the Day	Gino Fratelli	Paul Borghese	
2016	Andron	Adam	Francesco Cinquemani	
2016	Paris Can Wait	Michael	Eleanor Coppola	
2016	Blind	Bill Oakland	Michael Mailer	Also executive producer
2016	Rules Don't Apply	Robert Maheu	Warren Beatty	
2017	The Boss Baby	Boss Baby/Ted Templeton Jr. (voice)	Tom McGrath	
2017	An Imperfect Murder	Detective McCutcheon	James Toback	
2018	The Public	Detective Bill Ramstead	Emilio Estevez	
2018	BlacKkKlansman	Dr. Kennebrew Beaureguard	Spike Lee	Cameo
2018	Mission: Impossible – Fallout	Alan Hunley	Christopher McQuarrie	
2018	A Star Is Born	Himself	Bradley Cooper	Cameo
2019	Before You Know It	Peter	Hannah Pearl Utt	
2019	Drunk Parents	Frank Teagarten	Fred Wolf	
2019	Crown Vic	—N/a	Joel Souza	Producer
2019	Motherless Brooklyn	Moses Randolph	Edward Norton	
2019	Arctic Dogs	PB (voice)	Aaron Woodley	
2020	Beast Beast	—N/a	Danny Madden	Executive producer
2020	Pixie	Father Hector McGrath	Barnaby Thompson	
2020	Chick Fight	Jack Murphy	Paul Leyden	
2021	The Boss Baby: Family Business	Boss Baby/Ted Templeton Jr. (voice)	Tom McGrath	
2022	Tár	Himself (voice)	Todd Field	Cameo
2023	Supercell	Zane Rogers	Herbert James Winterstern	
2023	97 Minutes	Hawkins	Timo Vuorensola	
2023	Atrabilious	Proctor Carlisle	William Atticus Parker	
2023	Billie's Magic World	Lord Domino	Francesco Cinquemani	
2024	Clear Cut	Sam	Brian Skiba	
2024	Crescent City	Captain Howell	RJ Collins	
2024	Rust	Harland Rust	Joel Souza	Also story writer and producer
2026	Torrente for President	Donald Trump	Santiago Segura	
TBA	Kid Santa		Francesco Cinquemani	Completed
TBA	National Lampoon's Hollywood Hustle		Mike Hatton	Completed
TBA	The Cutting Room Floor	Scott	Victoria DeMartin	Post-production
TBA	Kockroach		Matt Ross	Post-production
TBA	El sastre del rey	El Mago	Pedro Casablanc	Post-production
TBA	Crosshairs	Detective Ray	Mukunda Michael Dewil	Post-production

== Television ==
Year	Title	Role	Notes
1980–1982	The Doctors	Billy Allison Aldrich	Regular role
1983	Cutter to Houston	Dr. Hal Wexler	9 episodes
1984	The Sheriff and the Astronaut	Sheriff Ed Cassaday	Television film
1984	Sweet Revenge	Major Alex Breen	Television film
1984–1985	Knots Landing	Joshua Rush	40 episodes
1985	Hotel	Dennis Medford	Episode: "Distortions"
1985	Love on the Run	Sean Carpenter	Television film
1986	Dress Gray	Rysam 'Ry' Slaight	Television film
1987	The Alamo: Thirteen Days to Glory	Colonel William B. Travis	Television film
1990–2017	Saturday Night Live	Himself (host) / various roles	17 episodes
1993	The Larry Sanders Show	Himself	Episode: "The List"
1995	A Streetcar Named Desire	Stanley Kowalski	Television film
1998, 2005	The Simpsons	Himself / Dr. Caleb Thorn (voices)	2 episodes
1999-2003	Thomas & Friends	Narrator (voice)	Series 5–6; US dub; 52 episodes
2000	Nuremberg	Robert H. Jackson	2 episodes; also executive producer
2000–2001	Clerks: The Animated Series	Leonardo Leonardo (voice)	6 episodes
2002	Friends	Parker	2 episodes
2002	Path to War	Robert McNamara	Television film
2003	Walking with Cavemen	Narrator (voice)	4 episodes
2003	Second Nature	Paul Kane	Television film
2004	Johnny Bravo	Himself (voice)	Episode: "Johnny Bravo Goes to Hollywood"
2004	The Fairly OddParents	Adult Timmy Turner (voice)	Episode: "Channel Chasers"
2004	Nip/Tuck	Dr. Barret Moore	Episode: "Joan Rivers"
2004	Las Vegas	Jack Keller	2 episodes
2005, 2018–2019	Will & Grace	Malcolm Widmark	10 episodes
2006	Great Performances: South Pacific	Luther Billis	Concert from Carnegie Hall, PBS
2006–2013, 2020	30 Rock	Jack Donaghy	139 episodes; also producer
2008	Journey to the Edge of the Universe	Narrator (voice)	Television documentary
2012	Frozen Planet	Narrator (voice)	6 episodes
2012, 2018	Comedians in Cars Getting Coffee	Himself	2 episodes
2014	Law & Order: Special Victims Unit	Jimmie MacArthur	Episode: "Criminal Stories"
2015–2016	The Jim Gaffigan Show	Himself	2 episodes
2016–2020, 2024	Saturday Night Live	Donald Trump, Robert F. Kennedy Jr.	41 episodes
2017	Julie's Greenroom	Himself	2 episodes
2017	Nightcap	Himself	Episode: "Match Game"
2018	American Experience	Theodore Roosevelt (voice)	Episode: "Into The Amazon"
2018	The Looming Tower	George Tenet	6 episodes
2021	Untitled Alec Baldwin/Kelsey Grammer project	Channing	Pilot; also executive producer
2021	Dr. Death	Robert Henderson	8 episodes; also executive producer
2026	Nation's Dumbest	Himself	Episode: "Parent Teacher Conference"

== Television events ==
Year	Title	Role	Notes
2003	Dreams & Giants	Himself (host)	Television special
2006–2008, 2012	America's Game: The Super Bowl Champions	Narrator (voice)	11 episodes
2009–2011, 2017	Turner Classic Movies: The Essentials	Himself (host)	16 episodes
2010	82nd Academy Awards	Himself (co-host)	Television special
2012	1st NFL Honors	Himself (host)	Television special
2013	2nd NFL Honors	Himself (host)	Television special
2013	Up Late with Alec Baldwin	Himself (host)	5 episodes
2014	3rd NFL Honors	Himself (host)	Television special
2015	Saturday Night Live 40th Anniversary Special	Himself	Anniversary special
2016–2021	Match Game	Himself (host)	65 episodes; also executive producer
2018	The Alec Baldwin Show	Himself (host)	8 episodes; also executive producer
2019	Comedy Central Roast of Alec Baldwin	Himself (roastee)	Television special
2019	Inside the Actors Studio	Himself (host)	Episode: "Henry Winkler", also executive producer
2025	Saturday Night Live 50th Anniversary Special	Himself	Anniversary special
2025	The Baldwins	Himself	Reality series; also executive producer

== Documentaries ==
Year	Title	Role	Notes
1989	Tong Tana	Narrator (voice)	Documentary film
1996	Wild Bill: Hollywood Maverick	Narrator (voice)	Documentary film
1996	Looking for Richard	1st Duke of Clarence	Documentary film
2003	Walking with Cavemen	Narrator (voice)	Documentary film
2008	Journey to the Edge of the Universe	Narrator (voice)	Documentary film
2011	Frozen Planet	Narrator (voice)	6 episodes
2013	Seduced and Abandoned	Himself	Documentary film; also producer
2013	Elaine Stritch: Shoot Me	Himself	Documentary film; also executive producer
2019	Framing John DeLorean	John DeLorean	Documentary film
2023	Silent Fallout	Narrator (voice)	Documentary film
2025	The Trial of Alec Baldwin	Himself	Documentary film

== Stage ==
Year	Title	Role	Notes
1986	Loot	Dennis	Music Box Theatre, Broadway
1988	Serious Money	Billy Corman	Royale Theatre, Broadway
1990	Prelude to a Kiss	Peter	Circle Repertory Theatre, Broadway
1992	A Streetcar Named Desire	Stanley Kowalski	Ethel Barrymore Theatre, Broadway
1998	Macbeth	Macbeth	The Public Theater, off-Broadway
2004	Twentieth Century	Oscar Jaffe	Broadhurst Theatre, Broadway
2006	Entertaining Mr Sloane	Ed	Laura Pels Theatre, off-Broadway
2010	Equus	Martin Dysart	Guild Hall of East Hampton
2013	Orphans	Harold	Gerald Schoenfeld Theatre, Broadway
2015	All My Sons	Joe Keller	Guild Hall of East Hampton
2018	Celebrity Autobiography	Performer	Marquis Theatre, Broadway

== Video games ==
Year	Title	Role	Notes
2007	World in Conflict	Narrator (voice)	
2009	World in Conflict: Soviet Assault	Narrator (voice)	Expansion pack to World in Conflict
