= Hilaria Baldwin =

American businesswoman and author (born 1984)

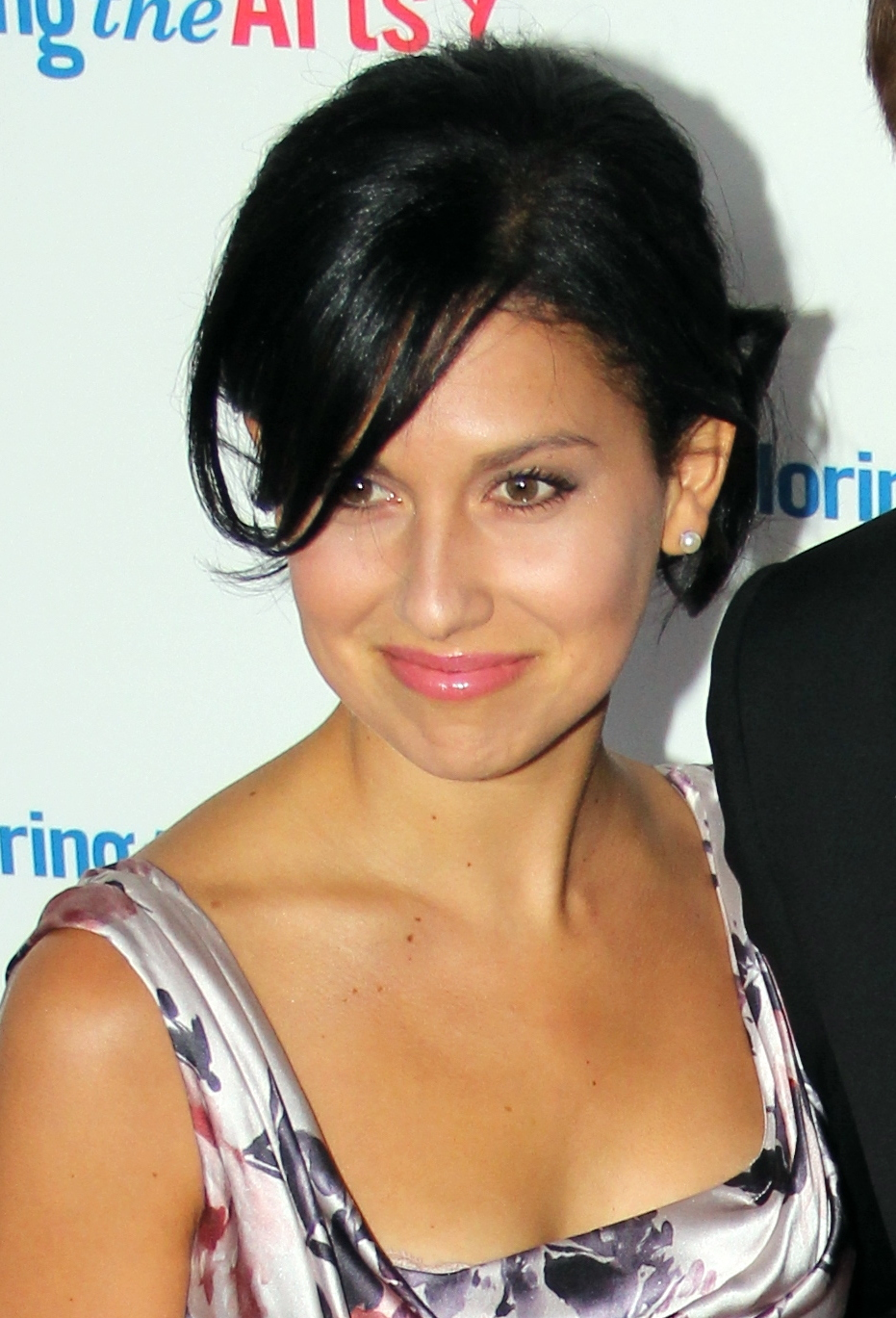
- Baldwin in 2011
- Born: Hillary Lynn Hayward-Thomas; January 6, 1984 (age 42); Boston, Massachusetts, U.S.
- Other name: Hilaria Thomas
- Education: New York University
- Occupations: Yoga instructor; podcaster; author; businesswoman
- Years active: 2004–present
- Spouse: Alec Baldwin (m. 2012)
- Children: 7
- Family: Baldwin (by marriage)

Hilaria Baldwin (born Hillary Lynn Hayward-Thomas, January 6, 1984) is an American businesswoman and the wife of actor Alec Baldwin, whom she married in 2012. The couple and their seven children are the focus of the TLC reality series The Baldwins.

She is also a yoga instructor, podcaster, and author. She was the co-founder of a chain of New York-based yoga studios called Yoga Vida, and has released an exercise DVD and a wellness-focused book.

== Early life ==
Hillary Lynn Hayward-Thomas was born in Boston, Massachusetts, on January 6, 1984, to Kathryn Hayward and David Thomas Jr. She is of English, French-Canadian, German, Irish, and Slovak descent. Hayward-Thomas has said that she was raised in a Spanish-speaking household and annually traveled to Spain during holidays. She has stated that she has been a vegetarian since age five. She has also stated that she began to use the name Hilaria "as she got older".

Hayward-Thomas's mother grew up in Massachusetts and spent her career practicing medicine there; she was an associate physician at Massachusetts General Hospital and assistant professor of medicine at Harvard Medical School before retiring from both positions in 2012. Her father was an attorney with an undergraduate degree in Spanish literature from Haverford College and a law degree from Georgetown University. The couple founded International Integrators, an integrative health organization, after moving to Spain and settling in Mallorca in 2011, not long before their daughter married Alec Baldwin. She has a brother named Jeremy Hayward-Thomas.

Hayward-Thomas's paternal grandfather was David Lloyd Thomas Sr. (1927/1928–2020), an "American with roots in the country that pre-dated the American Revolution", and her paternal grandmother, Mary Lou (Artman) Thomas, was from Nebraska. Thomas Sr. was a native of Ames, Iowa, and traveled extensively to Argentina as an auditor for General Electric and at one point lived there. He exposed his children to world cultures and raised them to be proficient in Spanish.

Hayward-Thomas attended the Cambridge School of Weston, a private co-educational high school in Weston, Massachusetts. She started college at age 19 at New York University, where she was on the ballroom dance team.

== Career ==
Hayward-Thomas started practicing yoga at around age 20. After attending New York University, she opened the yoga studio Yoga Vida in 2009 along with Michael "Mike" Patton in the West Village of New York City, which eventually opened three other locations in the Noho, Dumbo, and Tribeca neighborhoods. The Tribeca Citizen wrote in 2016 that their location had a range of classes, including "pre- and post-natal, restorative, and heated by infrared light". In 2013, Spencer Wolff, a former student in one of her classes, sued her in Manhattan Supreme Court for an injury he allegedly sustained in the class. The lawsuit was settled a year later, with Wolff signing a non-disclosure agreement.

In 2012, after marrying Alec Baldwin, Hilaria Baldwin became a lifestyle correspondent for the entertainment show Extra. The New York Times wrote that Baldwin obtained that position because Alec was a friend of Steve Sunshine, a producer for the show. In 2014, she shared a Daytime Emmy Award for Outstanding Entertainment News Program with her Extra colleagues. She periodically worked with Extra in that role through 2014.

In October 2013, Baldwin released an exercise DVD titled @ Home with Hilaria Baldwin: Fit Mommy-to-Be Prenatal Yoga. Alec appears during a five-minute "bonus section". In June 2014, El País described Baldwin as the "Gwyneth Paltrow" of New York City in reference to being a working wealthy mother.

Baldwin wrote the book The Living Clearly Method, which was released December 2016. When the book released, Baldwin started an associated website under the same name to promote it.

In 2017, Baldwin was awarded the Wellness Foundation's Illumination Award at that organization's summer benefit in the Hamptons.

In 2018, Baldwin partnered with podcaster Daphne Oz to create Mom Brain, a motherhood-focused podcast. Refinery29 described it as "a deep-dive into every single corner of motherhood, ranging from the serious moments to the hilarious ones, and everything in between". The two hosts went on Rachael Ray in November 2018 to talk about the project, followed by the Today show in December of that year. As of May 2021, Baldwin had not recorded any more episodes since the start of the allegations of cultural appropriation in December 2020. Baldwin later launched two other podcasts, What’s One More? with husband Alec Baldwin and Witches Anonymous with jewelry designer Michelle Campbell.

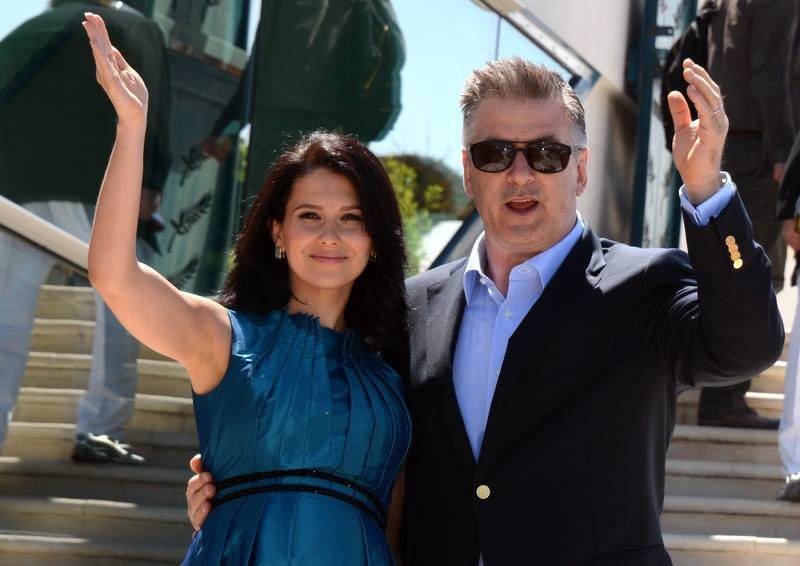
Baldwin with husband Alec Baldwin at the Cannes Film Festival in 2013

In February 2019, Baldwin and her husband spoke to a United Nations panel about food choices and a sustainable planet at the launch of the EAT-Lancet Commission on Food, Health and Planet initiative. Baldwin was identified as a "wellness expert" on the panel.

Baldwin has been on the cover of multiple magazines, the most notable of which include Hello!, Fit Pregnancy, ¡Hola!, Parents; and Belgium's Télépro.

In September 2025, Baldwin was announced as a contestant on season 34 of Dancing with the Stars; she was paired with professional dancer Gleb Savchenko. Some commentators pointed out that her casting appeared to be in violation of the show's longstanding rule prohibiting contestants with former professional ballroom dancing experience; in response, Baldwin denied that her experience as a competitive ballroom dancer during college would qualify. She was the fourth contestant eliminated, and later blamed her early exit on "[being] bullied off the show" in reference to the controversy caused by her prior dancing experience.

== Personal life ==
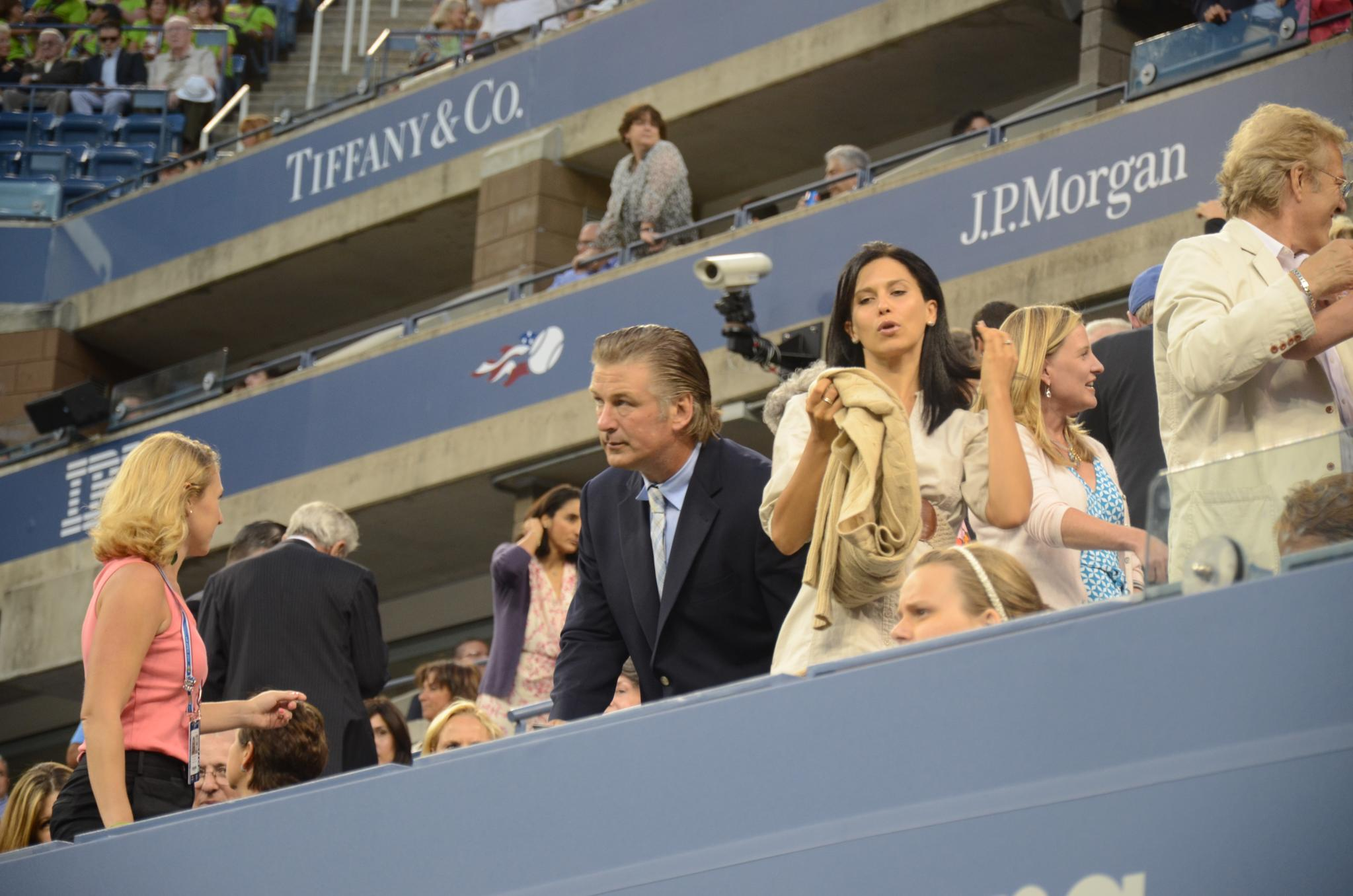
Hilaria Baldwin (center right) with husband Alec (center left) at the 2011 US Open, Opening Day

In February 2011, Hilaria Thomas met Alec Baldwin at Sarma Melngailis's New York restaurant Pure Food and Wine. Around August that year, the two began dating. They moved from the Upper West Side to Greenwich Village that August. The couple became engaged in April 2012, and they married on June 30, 2012, in a Catholic ceremony at St. Patrick's Old Cathedral in New York City. The Spanish phrase somos un buen equipo (English: we're a great team) is engraved on the inside of their wedding bands. The couple has seven children together. Baldwin is also stepmother to Ireland Baldwin, Alec's daughter from his previous marriage to American actress Kim Basinger.

Baldwin has said that she suffered from anorexia nervosa and bulimia in her high school years and early twenties. In her book, Baldwin recounted that she suffered health issues and was miserable; feeling that way motivated her future career as a healthy lifestyle advocate. Baldwin stated she started getting better when she started "thinking of weight and health separately". Baldwin is a pescetarian.

=== Ancestry and identity ===
Baldwin is of English, French-Canadian, German, Irish, and Slovak descent. In December 2020, a Twitter user accused Baldwin of "impersonat[ing] a Spanish person" and posted video clips of Baldwin speaking with a Spanish accent, including a clip from the Today Show in which Baldwin seemingly forgot the English word for "cucumber". The tweets prompted accusations in various media publications of Baldwin's cultural appropriation, since at other times she has been recorded speaking American-accented English. Her talent agent's website listed her birthplace as Mallorca rather than Boston. Baldwin was often misidentified as either Mallorcan, Spanish, or Latina, encouraging positive press by Hispanic media, such as the celebrity gossip magazine ¡Hola!. Baldwin affirmed mistaken statements that she was "half-Spanish" while speaking at the United Nations, and spoke "as if she has a Spaniard's familiarity with that country's food culture".

In March 2021, The Atlantic listed Baldwin as an "identity hoaxer" along with Rachel Dolezal and Jessica Krug. Baldwin responded that she identifies as white, and her ethnic background includes "many, many, many things". Baldwin claims that she was raised in a Spanish-speaking household. She said she spent "some" of her childhood in Spain and "some" in Massachusetts, but had never been enrolled in school in Spain, only spending time there during family holidays. She has stated that she began to use the name Hilaria "as she got older". Baldwin also claimed her inability to remember the word "cucumber" resulted from stage fright during one of her first television appearances, and that she is bilingual and her accent comes and goes depending on stress and other factors. She described herself as "multi" and culturally "fluid".

== Books ==
- Baldwin, Hilaria (December 27, 2016). The Living Clearly Method: 5 Principles for a Fit Body, Healthy Mind & Joyful Life. Rodale. ISBN 978-1-62336-698-8.
- Baldwin, Carmen; Baldwin, Hilaria (April 2025). Glowing Up: Recipes to Rock Your Natural Beauty. Di Angelo Publications. ISBN 978-1-962603-32-4.
- Baldwin, Hilaria (May 6, 2025). Manual Not Included. Simon and Schuster. ISBN 978-1-6680-1000-6.
