= Roy Martineau =

American football player and wrestler (1900–1961)

Profile
- Positions: Guard, fullback, tackle

Personal information
- Born: August 20, 1900; Syracuse, New York, U.S.
- Died: October 25, 1961 (aged 61); Syracuse, New York, U.S.
- Listed height: 6 ft 0 in (1.83 m)
- Listed weight: 210 lb (95 kg)

Career information
- High school: Solvay (NY)
- College: Buffalo, Syracuse

Career history
- Buffalo All-Americans (1923); Rochester Jeffersons (1924–1925)

Daniel Roy Martineau (August 20, 1900 – October 25, 1961) was an American football player, coach, and professional wrestler.

Martineau was born in 1900 in Solvay, New York. He attended Solvay High School in Solvay, New York. He played college football at Syracuse. He also rowed for the Syracuse crew, was a member of the wrestling team, and worked on the Delaware & Hudson Railroad. In November 1922, he was suspended from further participation in college athletics on the charge that he participated in a professional football game in Utica, New York.

He played professional football in the National Football League (NFL) as a fullback, tackle, and guard for the Buffalo All-Americans in 1923 and the Rochester Jeffersons in 1924 and 1925. He appeared in 18 NFL games, 13 of them as a starter.

In 1926, he returned to Syracuse as line coach and freshman coach. He also began participating in professional wrestling. By 1929, he was serving as the municipal athletic director in Syracuse, New York.

He later worked as city parks commissioner in Syracuse. The Martineau Park in Eastwood is named for him.

== Family ==
Martineau was married in 1923 to Marion A. Sidman, though the wedding was kept secret until 1924. Martineau died in 1961 at age 61 in Syracuse.

Philanthropist Carol Baldwin, mother of Alec Baldwin, was his daughter.
