= Grudge Match =

2013 film by Peter Segal

- Theatrical release poster
- Directed by: Peter Segal
- Screenplay by: Tim Kelleher; Rodney Rothman
- Story by: Tim Kelleher
- Produced by: Bill Gerber; Mark Steven Johnson; Michael Ewing; Peter Segal; Ravi Mehta
- Starring: Robert De Niro; Sylvester Stallone; Kevin Hart; Alan Arkin; Kim Basinger; Jon Bernthal
- Cinematography: Dean Semler
- Edited by: William Kerr
- Music by: Trevor Rabin
- Production companies: Gerber Pictures; Callahan Filmworks
- Distributed by: Warner Bros. Pictures
- Release date: December 25, 2013
- Running time: 113 minutes
- Country: United States
- Language: English
- Budget: $40 million
- Box office: $44.9 million

Grudge Match is a 2013 American sports comedy film directed by Peter Segal. The film stars Sylvester Stallone and Robert De Niro as aging boxers stepping into the ring for one last bout. Stallone and De Niro had both previously been in successful boxing films (Rocky and Raging Bull, respectively) and had worked together in Cop Land. It had been scheduled for release on January 10, 2014, but was moved up to December 25, 2013.

== Plot ==
In their prime, Pittsburgh boxers Henry "Razor" Sharp and Billy "The Kid" McDonnen become rivals after two fights, one in which Kid beats Razor and one in which Razor beats Kid, the only defeats of their careers. Before they have a rematch, Razor announces his retirement without explanation, infuriating Kid for costing them a big payday.

Years later, Razor is low on money and working in a shipyard when he is visited by promoter Dante Slate Jr., who wants Razor to provide a motion capture performance for a video game. It was Dante's father whose shady business dealings had put Razor in dire financial straits. The soft-spoken Razor wants no part of this stunt, but Kid, a showoff who runs a bar and a car dealership, is all for it. Razor begrudgingly accepts $15,000 needed to care for his ailing former trainer Lightning Conlon and pay his overdue bills.

At the recording studio, Razor is surprised and taunted by Kid, who was also invited by Dante. The two get into a fight and damage the studio before being arrested. Cellphone footage of the fight is uploaded to YouTube and goes viral, giving Dante the idea of organizing a final grudge match between Razor and Kid, which he will promote as "Grudgement Day".

Kid eagerly accepts. Razor is forced to accept as well, not receiving his $15,000 after learning he has been fired from the shipyard. At the press conference to announce the grudge match, Razor is approached by his ex-girlfriend Sally-Rose Henderson, who cheated on him with Kid during their youth and ended up becoming pregnant. Now widowed, Sally wants to reconnect with Razor, but he is reluctant.

Razor asks his old trainer Lightning to get him back in shape. Kid expects gym owner Frankie Brite to train him, but Frankie mocks the fight and is of little help. Kid is approached by his estranged biological son B.J., against Sally's wishes. The two begin to bond after B.J. gives Kid helpful advice regarding his technique, and is invited to be his trainer.

Lightning learns that Razor is blind in one eye. Realizing that a fight could cause permanent damage, Lightning and Sally both implore Razor to call it off, but he decides to go through with the fight.

Kid takes his grandson Trey to celebrate the news that the grudge match is sold out. B.J. believes they are going to a movie, but Kid takes the child to a bar, but leaves him on his own while hooking up with a groupie. Trey accidentally starts Kid's car while he is in the backseat having sex. Kid prevents an accident, but he is arrested, and B.J. is infuriated that he endangered the boy. Kid apologizes to B.J. and gives him a scrapbook that he kept of B.J.'s sports career in school, proving he had not been disinterested in him throughout the years. Ultimately, B.J. forgives him.

When the grudge match begins, Kid gains the upper hand, severely beating Razor by unknowingly exploiting his blind eye. After learning of Razor's condition, however, Kid stops focusing on the eye and helps Razor to his feet. Razor turns the fight to his favor, but likewise helps Kid onto his feet after nearly knocking him out. The fight ends and the judges decide it on points. Razor is declared the winner by a very close split decision. He celebrates with Sally and Lightning while a satisfied Kid enjoys the company of B.J. and Trey, who are proud of what he has accomplished.

When all is said and done, Razor has a new TV, on which he and Lightning view a performance by Kid on Dancing with the Stars and quickly deduce that he is having sex with his partner. As well, Dante tries to set up another grudge match between Mike Tyson and Evander Holyfield. Holyfield refuses several increasingly higher offers to fight Tyson before showing interest when Slate offers Holyfield a role in a fourth Hangover film. Tyson, frustrated by this, approaches Dante angrily before the scene ends.

== Cast ==
- Sylvester Stallone as Henry "Razor" Sharp
- Robert De Niro as Billy "The Kid" McDonnen
- Kevin Hart as Dante Slate Jr.
- Alan Arkin as Louis "Lightning" Conlon
- Kim Basinger as Sally-Rose Henderson
- Jon Bernthal as B. J.
- LL Cool J as Frankie Brite
- Anthony Anderson as Mr. Sandpaper Hands
- Joey Diaz as Mikey
- Camden Gray as Trey

Jim Lampley, Steve Levy, John Buccigross, Mike Goldberg, Chael Sonnen, Larry Merchant, Roy Jones Jr., Michael Buffer, Mike Tyson, and Evander Holyfield appear as themselves. Kim Basinger's daughter, Ireland Basinger Baldwin, appears as Young Sally.

== Production ==
=== Development ===
Doug Ellin was brought on to provide rewrites in early 2012. He was left uncredited for his work.

In preparation for the film, both actors trained with boxing trainer Bob Sale. During training, Sylvester Stallone went down to 168 pounds, his lowest weight since 1981.

=== Filming ===
Filming commenced in New Orleans, Louisiana, in late 2012 and wrapped in March 2013, while several different establishing shots of Downtown Pittsburgh and the Edgar Thomson Steel Works were shot in the Pittsburgh metropolitan area.

== Reception ==
=== Box office ===
Grudge Match grossed $7 million in its opening weekend, finishing in 11th place at the box office. Made on a $40 million budget, the film made $45 million worldwide.

=== Critical response ===
Grudge Match received generally negative reviews. On Rotten Tomatoes, the film has an approval rating of 31% based on 141 reviews, with an average rating of 4.5/10. The site's critical consensus reads: "Grudge Match is sporadically funny but meandering, and its strong cast is largely mired in a plot that's overrun with cliches." On Metacritic, the film has a score of 35 out of 100 based on 32 critics, indicating "generally unfavorable" reviews. Audiences polled by CinemaScore gave the film an average grade of "B+" on a scale of A+ to F.

Andrew Barker of Variety wrote, "Essentially recasting Grumpy Old Men with the senescent specters of Rocky Balboa and Jake LaMotta, the result is sporadically amusing, with some chucklesome sight gags and crowdpleasing supporting turns from Alan Arkin and Kevin Hart, yet it's all so overcooked that it defeats its own purpose."

Peter Travers of Rolling Stone wrote, "Watching De Niro and Stallone piss all over their most iconic roles provides no pleasure. It made me feel – Sad. Sad. Sad."

John DeFore of The Hollywood Reporter wrote, "The movie only wakes up when Hart or Arkin are on screen (preferably together)."

Peter Bradshaw of The Guardian called the film "A preposterous, worthless mediocrity. ... Never have I yearned more passionately to climb into my time machine and journey back to before my memory of Raging Bull was needlessly trashed by this incredibly depressing and worthless mediocrity."

In a 2018 chat with Interview, Kim Basinger briefly disclosed that she did not personally enjoy her experience filming Grudge Match.

=== Accolades ===
Stallone was nominated for a Golden Raspberry Award for Worst Actor for his performance in the film (along with Bullet to the Head and Escape Plan), but he lost to Jaden Smith for After Earth. (It was Stallone's 14th bid for the "prize", a record, which he has "won" four times, also a record.)

== See also ==
- List of boxing films
