= Ireland Baldwin =

American fashion model (born 1995)

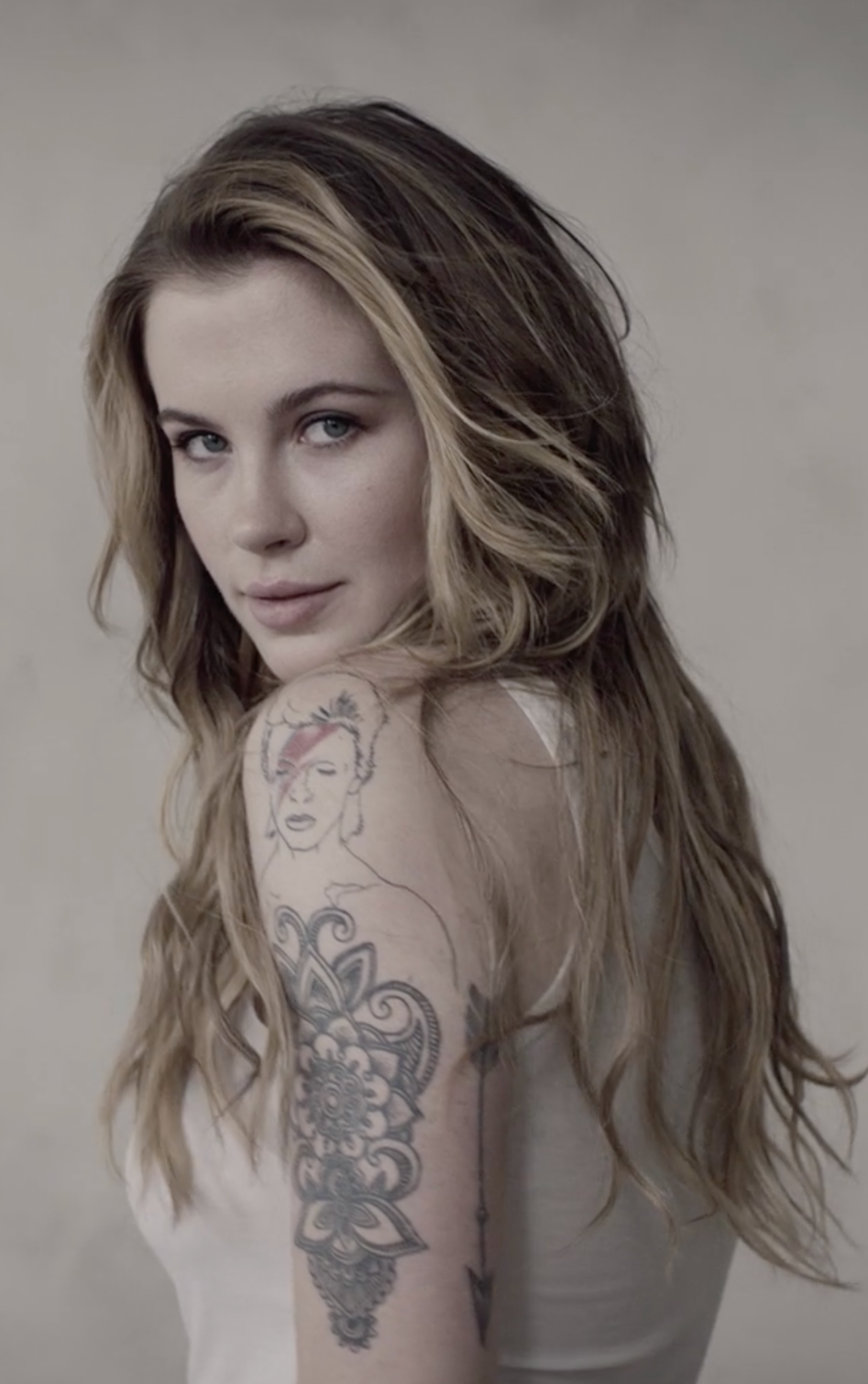
- Baldwin in 2016
- Born: Ireland Eliesse Baldwin; October 23, 1995 (age 31); Los Angeles, California, U.S.
- Other name: Ireland Basinger Baldwin
- Education: New York Film Academy
- Occupations: Model; actress
- Years active: 2013–present
- Children: 1
- Parent(s): Alec Baldwin; Kim Basinger
- Relatives: Baldwin family

Ireland Eliesse Baldwin (born October 23, 1995), also known as Ireland Basinger Baldwin, is an American fashion model and actress. Baldwin started modeling and acting in 2013 and appeared in the film Grudge Match and in editorials for magazines such as Grazia. Baldwin is also a vocal advocate for animal rights and posed for PETA 24 years after her mother, Kim Basinger, did.

== Early life ==
Baldwin was born in Los Angeles to actors Alec Baldwin and Kim Basinger. She is also the niece of actors Stephen, Daniel, and William Baldwin and cousin to model Hailey Bieber. Through her father’s second marriage, she has seven younger half-siblings: three half-sisters and four half-brothers.

At age 11 in 2007, she gained attention in the media after her father left her an angry voicemail message, which became publicized.

== Career ==
Baldwin signed with IMG Models in March 2013. In April, she made her modeling debut in a swimwear editorial for the New York Post. In May, Baldwin appeared in W Magazine's It Trend, It Girl feature. Baldwin was Vanity Fair's It Girl in June, photographed by Patrick Demarchelier. Her first magazine cover appearance was for Modern Luxury's second issue of Beach in July, appearing in a white bikini. Elle interviewed Baldwin in its September 2013 issue. The editorial accompanying the interview was photographed by Thomas Whiteside and styled by Joe Zee. She appeared in an editorial for DuJour magazine, photographed by Bruce Weber. Baldwin made her acting debut in the film Grudge Match, playing a younger version of Kim Basinger's character, Sally.

In 2014, Baldwin began studying at the New York Film Academy, mainly cinematography and acting. She attended the 86th Academy Awards alongside Nancy O'Dell and Joe Zee as media correspondents for Entertainment Tonight.

In April 2015, Baldwin resigned from IMG after a stint in rehab. She signed with DT Model Management in June 2015.

In 2017, Baldwin appeared in campaigns for True Religion Jeans and Guess. In May, she appeared on the covers of Elle Bulgaria, L'Officiel Ukraine, and Marie Claire Mexico. Baldwin appeared in the film Campus Caller as the main character, Macey Duncan.

In 2018, she posed nude for a PETA "I'd Rather Go Naked Than Wear Fur" anti-fur ad campaign, 24 years after her mother did the same. The promotional video for the piece featured Baldwin stating that she has a "no fur" policy in her contract. In September, Baldwin appeared on the cover of Grazia, shot by Yu Tsai.

In 2019, Baldwin was hired to DJ alongside Caroline D'Amore for the Norah restaurant's 3rd anniversary. She said she was "Definitely not a full time DJ". In September, Baldwin was hired to DJ at Smile Train's annual Pool Party charity event. She also appeared in the Comedy Central Roast of her father Alec, doing an unannounced routine.

== Personal life ==
In 2014, Baldwin was in a relationship with rapper Angel Haze. In 2015, Haze devoted her track "Candlxs" to Baldwin; the cover art depicting Baldwin and Haze was painted by Haze. Several months later Baldwin ended the relationship before checking herself into Malibu's Soba Recovery Center for "emotional trauma". In 2018, she began dating musician Corey Harper.

In 2019, Baldwin alleged in an Instagram story about the Human Life Protection Act that she was a victim of sexual assault. In the story, she said that she is a survivor and that "one day [she] will reveal the true story". She also claimed that at the time, she began to rely on substances, resulting in what she characterized as "sabotaging" her career. In 2022, she expanded on that story on TikTok, saying she was raped as a teenager while she was unconscious. She also wrote that she had an abortion in response to an unrelated incident, "because I know exactly what it felt like to be born to two people who hated each other".

In late December 2022, Baldwin announced on Instagram that she and musician RAC were expecting their first child together. On May 18, 2023, Baldwin gave birth to their daughter. On May 24, 2026, Baldwin announced that she is expecting their second child.

== Filmography ==
Year	Title	Role	Notes
2013	Grudge Match	Young Sally	
2016	Ridiculousness	Herself	Season 7 episode 26
2016	Love Advent	Herself	Episode: “Ireland Baldwin”
2017	Campus Caller	Macey Duncan	
2020	A Dark Foe	Madeleine	
2025	The Baldwins	Herself	Episode: “Glengarry Glen Floss”
