= Mahalia Jackson Theater of the Performing Arts =

Theater in New Orleans, Louisiana

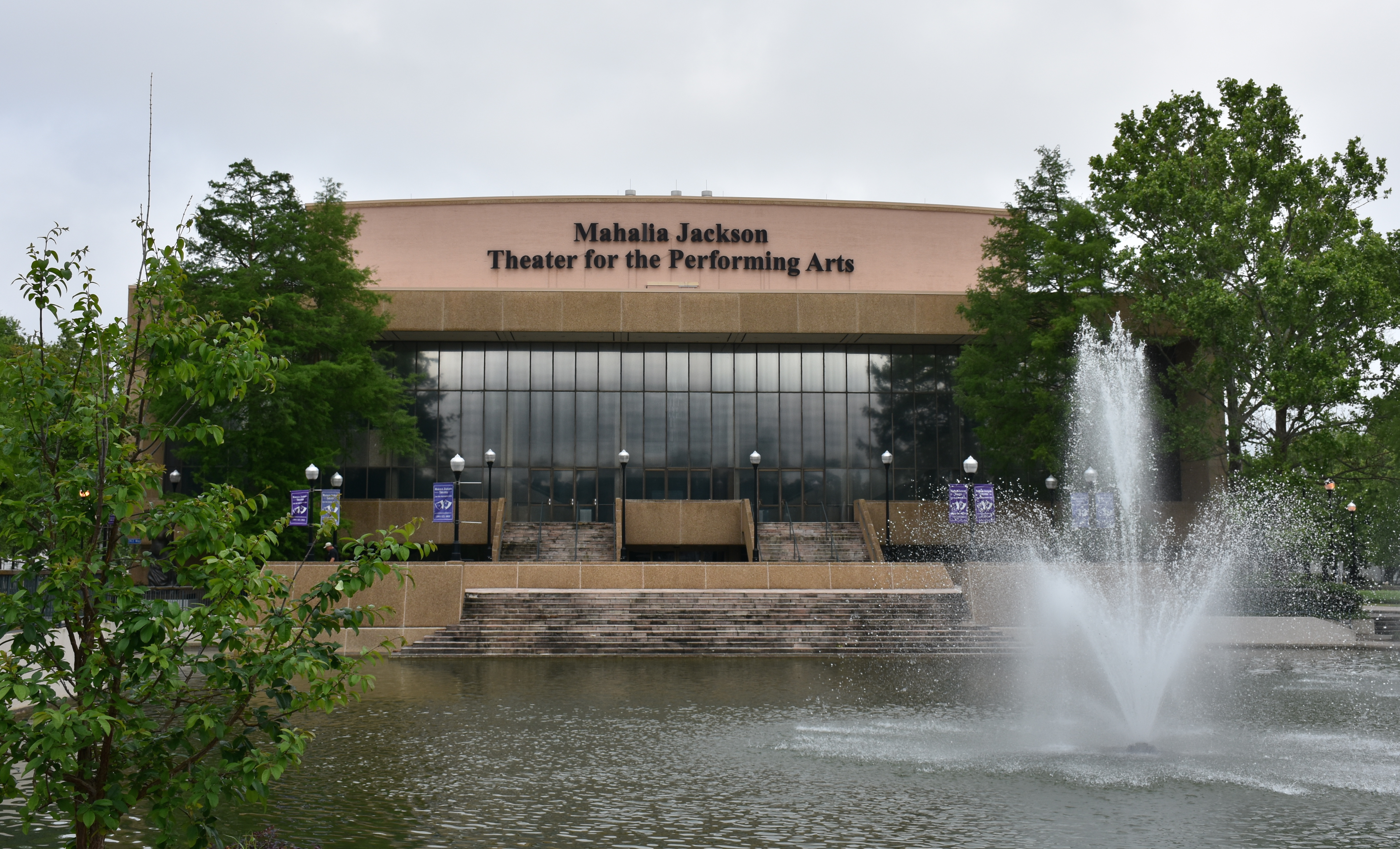
- Interactive map of Mahalia Jackson Theater of the Performing Arts
- Address: 1419 Basin Street; New Orleans, Louisiana; United States
- Coordinates: 29.96312°N 90.06931°W
- Owner: Ambassador Theatre Group
- Capacity: 2,100
- Type: Performing arts
- Current use: Performing arts venue

Construction
- Opened: January 1973
- Closed: August 2005
- Reopened: January 8, 2009

Website
- Official website

The Mahalia Jackson Theater of the Performing Arts is a theater located in Louis Armstrong Park in New Orleans, Louisiana. It was named after gospel singer Mahalia Jackson, who was born in New Orleans. The theater reopened in January 2009, after being closed since the landfall of Hurricane Katrina (August 29, 2005).

It serves as the long-term residence of the New Orleans Ballet Association, the New Orleans Opera Association, and the Broadway Across America touring productions.

== History ==
The 2,100-seat Mahalia Jackson Theater first opened in January 1973, with a performance of Giuseppe Verdi's Messa da Requiem, starring New Orleans native Norman Treigle and the New Orleans Philharmonic-Symphony Orchestra, conducted by Werner Torkanowsky.

Before Hurricane Katrina, it was the home of the New Orleans Opera Association and the New Orleans Ballet Association and held occasional performances by the New Orleans Jazz Orchestra and other groups. It was also the home of the Louisiana Philharmonic Orchestra for about ten years, before the orchestra moved to the Orpheum Theater.

Diana Ross played a three-night, sold-out engagement at the theater in 1996. It was deemed one of the most successful pop concerts at the venue.

== Return ==
In the aftermath of Hurricane Katrina on August 29, 2005, the Mahalia Jackson Theater was severely damaged. The theater sustained 14 ft. of water, which damaged the motor control center, orchestra lifts, heating and air-conditioning controls, sewerage ejector pumps and other structural components. Following Katrina, repairs and upgrades were made including the addition of enhanced lighting and a new sound system, orchestra shell, ballet floor, and digital cinema screen. The cost of the theater renovation was around US$27 million, and was financed by local tax dollars, about $8.5 million from the Federal Emergency Management Agency, and a $500,000 grant from the Andrew W. Mellon Foundation.

About a week of events from January 8 through January 17, 2009, celebrated the reopening of the theater, including a free performance by Kermit Ruffins, Irma Thomas, and Marva Wright as well as paid performances by Allen Toussaint, Yolanda Adams, the Louisiana Philharmonic Orchestra with Itzhak Perlman, New Orleans Ballet Association with members of the San Francisco and New York City Ballets, and the New Orleans Opera Association with Plácido Domingo.

Mahalia Jackson Theater was the first of the major theaters in New Orleans to reopen after Hurricane Katrina. City officials hoped the theater would help draw tourists to the city.

In 2013 the theater hosted the 2012 NFL Honors, honoring the best National Football League players and performances.

== Broadway in New Orleans (2009–present) ==
On June 25, 2009, Broadway Across America and Mayor Ray Nagin announced that touring shows would return to the theater for the 2009–10 season. Shows featured were Cats, The Color Purple, Mamma Mia!, Wicked, and Avenue Q. Broadway shows toured here while the Saenger Theatre, State Palace Theatre, and the Orpheum Theater were undergoing major renovations due to Hurricane Katrina.

On March 16, the 2010-11 Broadway Across America season was announced. Shows included were: Cirque Dreams Illumination, RAIN, Spamalot, West Side Story, and Shrek. The Color Purple also returned to the theater as a special, due to popular demand. On May 4, 2010 Storytime Live! was added to the 2009–2010 season, with dates set for July 23–25.

The national tour of The Addams Family in September 2011 was the first Broadway musical to take advantage of the incentive programs offered by Louisiana Entertainment, the state's comprehensive entertainment industry development office.

The 2011–2012 season was announced on March 14, 2011. The Lion King, which was originally set to have its Louisiana debut at the Saenger Theatre in spring 2012, played instead at the Mahalia Jackson Theater.

== See also ==
- List of concert halls
- List of music venues
- List of opera houses
- Theatre in Louisiana
