= List of awards and nominations received by Alec Baldwin =

Alec Baldwin awards and nominations
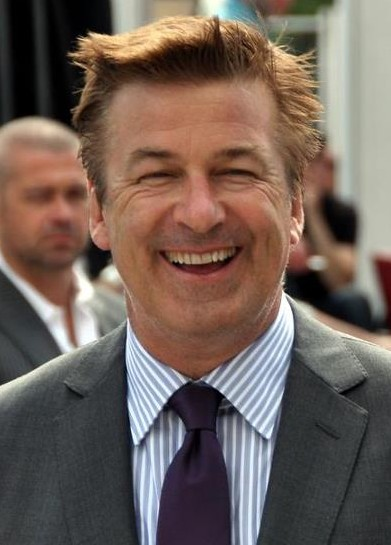
- Baldwin at the 2012 Cannes Film Festival
Awards and nominations
Award	Wins	Nominations
Academy Awards	0	1
BAFTA Awards	0	1
Emmy Awards	3	20
Golden Globes	3	11
SAG Awards	8	20
Tony Awards	0	1

Totals (Note: Certain award groups do not simply award one winner. They acknowledge several different recipients, have runners-up, and have third place. Since this is a specific recognition and is different from losing an award, runner-up mentions are considered wins in this award tally. For simplification and to avoid errors, each award in this list has been presumed to have had a prior nomination.)
- Wins: 22
- Nominations: 78

Alec Baldwin is an American actor known for his roles on stage and screen and has received three Primetime Emmy Awards, three Golden Globe Awards and eight Screen Actors Guild Awards as well as nominations for an Academy Award, a BAFTA Award, and a Tony Award.

Baldwin received his Academy Award nomination for Best Supporting Actor for his performance in the drama The Cooler (2003). He received 19 Primetime Emmy Award nominations, winning twice for his performance as Jack Donaghy in the Tina Fey created NBC sitcom 30 Rock (2008, 2009) and for his performance as Donald Trump on Saturday Night Live (2017). He has also received 11 Golden Globe Award nominations, winning for 30 Rock (2007, 2009, 2010), and 20 Screen Actors Guild Award nominations, winning eight times for 30 Rock. He received a British Academy Film Award nomination for his supporting performance in Nancy Meyers' romantic comedy It's Complicated (2009).

Having won eight Screen Actors Guild Awards, he is the most SAG-awarded male actor, and tied with Julianna Margulies as the most SAG-awarded actor overall. Additionally, with twenty total nominations, he and Margulies are tied for the record of third-most SAG nominations.

On stage, he received a Tony Award nomination for Best Actor in a Play for his performance as Stanley Kowalski in the Broadway revival of Tennessee Williams' A Streetcar Named Desire in 1992. He won an Obie Award for Outstanding Distinguished Performance for his role in the Craig Lucas play Prelude to a Kiss (1990). The role also earned him a Drama Desk Award for Outstanding Actor in a Play nomination.

== Major associations ==
=== Academy Awards ===
Year	Category	Nominated work	Result	Ref.
2004	Best Supporting Actor	The Cooler	Nominated	

=== BAFTA Award ===
Year	Category	Nominated work	Result	Ref.
British Academy Film Award
2009	Best Actor in a Supporting Role	It's Complicated	Nominated	

=== Emmy Awards ===
Year	Category	Nominated work	Result	Ref.
Primetime Emmy Awards
1996	Outstanding Lead Actor in a Miniseries or Special	A Streetcar Named Desire	Nominated	
2001	Outstanding Miniseries	Nuremberg	Nominated	
2002	Outstanding Supporting Actor in a Miniseries or a Movie	Path to War	Nominated	
2005	Outstanding Guest Actor in a Comedy Series	Will & Grace	Nominated	
2006	Outstanding Guest Actor in a Comedy Series	Will & Grace	Nominated	
2007	Outstanding Lead Actor in a Comedy Series	30 Rock (episode: "Hiatus")	Nominated	
2008	Outstanding Lead Actor in a Comedy Series	30 Rock (episode: "Rosemary's Baby")	Won	
2009	Outstanding Lead Actor in a Comedy Series	30 Rock (episode: "Generalissimo")	Won	
2010	Outstanding Lead Actor in a Comedy Series	30 Rock (episode: "Don Geiss, America and Hope")	Nominated	
2010	Outstanding Special Class Program	82nd Academy Awards	Nominated	
2011	Outstanding Comedy Series	30 Rock (season 5)	Nominated	
2011	Outstanding Lead Actor in a Comedy Series	30 Rock (episode: "Respawn")	Nominated	
2012	Outstanding Comedy Series	30 Rock (season 6)	Nominated	
2012	Outstanding Lead Actor in a Comedy Series	30 Rock (episode: "Live from Studio 6H")	Nominated	
2013	Outstanding Comedy Series	30 Rock (season 7)	Nominated	
2013	Outstanding Lead Actor in a Comedy Series	30 Rock (episode: "A Goon's Deed in a Weary World")	Nominated	
2017	Outstanding Host for a Reality Program	Match Game	Nominated	
2017	Outstanding Supporting Actor in a Comedy Series	Saturday Night Live (episode: "Melissa McCarthy / Haim")	Won	
2018	Outstanding Supporting Actor in a Comedy Series	Saturday Night Live (episode: "Donald Glover / Childish Gambino")	Nominated	
2021	Outstanding Guest Actor in a Comedy Series	Saturday Night Live (episode: "Dave Chappelle / Foo Fighters")	Nominated	

=== Golden Globe Awards ===
Year	Category	Nominated work	Result	Ref.
1996	Best Actor – Miniseries/Television	A Streetcar Named Desire	Nominated	
2001	Best Actor – Miniseries/Television	Nuremberg	Nominated	
2003	Best Supporting Actor – Television	Path to War	Nominated	
2004	Best Supporting Actor – Film	The Cooler	Nominated	
2007	Best Actor – Television Musical or Comedy	30 Rock	Won	
2008	Best Actor – Television Musical or Comedy	30 Rock	Nominated	
2009	Best Actor – Television Musical or Comedy	30 Rock	Won	
2010	Best Actor – Television Musical or Comedy	30 Rock	Won	
2011	Best Actor – Television Musical or Comedy	30 Rock	Nominated	
2012	Best Actor – Television Musical or Comedy	30 Rock	Nominated	
2013	Best Actor – Television Musical or Comedy	30 Rock	Nominated	

=== Screen Actors Guild Awards ===
Year	Category	Nominated work	Result	Ref.
1996	Outstanding Male Actor in a Miniseries or Television Movie	A Streetcar Named Desire	Nominated	
2001	Outstanding Male Actor in a Miniseries or Television Movie	Nuremberg	Nominated	
2004	Outstanding Male Actor in a Supporting Role	The Cooler	Nominated	
2005	Outstanding Cast in a Motion Picture	The Aviator	Nominated	
2007	Outstanding Cast in a Motion Picture	The Departed	Nominated	
2007	Outstanding Male Actor in a Comedy Series	30 Rock (season one)	Won	
2008	Outstanding Ensemble in a Comedy Series	30 Rock (season two)	Nominated	
2008	Outstanding Male Actor in a Comedy Series	30 Rock (season two)	Won	
2009	Outstanding Ensemble in a Comedy Series	30 Rock (season three)	Won	
2009	Outstanding Male Actor in a Comedy Series	30 Rock (season three)	Won	
2010	Outstanding Ensemble in a Comedy Series	30 Rock (season four)	Nominated	
2010	Outstanding Male Actor in a Comedy Series	30 Rock (season four)	Won	
2011	Outstanding Ensemble in a Comedy Series	30 Rock (season five)	Nominated	
2011	Outstanding Male Actor in a Comedy Series	30 Rock (season five)	Won	
2012	Outstanding Ensemble in a Comedy Series	30 Rock (season six)	Nominated	
2012	Outstanding Male Actor in a Comedy Series	30 Rock (season six)	Won	
2013	Outstanding Ensemble in a Comedy Series	30 Rock (season seven)	Nominated	
2013	Outstanding Male Actor in a Comedy Series	30 Rock (season seven)	Won	
2014	Outstanding Ensemble in a Comedy Series	30 Rock (season seven part II)	Nominated	
2014	Outstanding Male Actor in a Comedy Series	30 Rock (season seven part II)	Nominated	

=== Tony Awards ===
Year	Category	Nominated work	Result	Ref.
1992	Best Actor in a Play	A Streetcar Named Desire	Nominated	

== Theatre awards ==
=== Drama Desk Award ===
Year	Category	Nominated work	Result	Ref.
1990	Outstanding Actor in a Play	Prelude to a Kiss	Nominated	

=== Obie Award ===
Year	Category	Nominated work	Result	Ref.
1990	Distinguished Performance	Prelude to a Kiss	Won	

=== Theatre World Award ===
Year	Category	Nominated work	Result	Ref.
1986	Theatre World Award	Loot	Won	

== Critics awards ==
Year	Award	Category	Project	Result
2000	National Board of Review	Best Cast	State and Main	Won
2000	Online Film Critics Society	Best Cast	State and Main	Won
2003	Broadcast Film Critics Association	Best Supporting Actor	The Cooler	Nominated
2003	Chicago Film Critics Association	Best Supporting Actor	The Cooler	Nominated
2003	National Board of Review	Best Supporting Actor	The Cooler	Won
2003	Vancouver Film Critics Circle	Best Supporting Actor	The Cooler	Won
2003	Dallas-Fort Worth Film Critics Association	Best Supporting Actor	The Cooler	Won
2003	Online Film Critics Society Award	Best Supporting Actor	The Cooler	Nominated
2003	Satellite Award	Best Supporting Actor	The Cooler	Nominated
2006	National Board of Review	Best Cast	The Departed	Nominated
2009	National Board of Review	Best Cast	It's Complicated	Won
