= The Alec Baldwin Show =

American talk show television series

- Also known as: Sundays with Alec Baldwin
- Genre: Talk show
- Directed by: Jerry Foley
- Presented by: Alec Baldwin
- Theme music composer: John J. Ambrosini; Alec Baldwin
- Country of origin: United States
- Original language: English
- No. of seasons: 1
- No. of episodes: 10 (2 unaired)

Production
- Executive producers: Jason Schrift; Alec Baldwin
- Producers: Dan Bova; Ron Fried; Stephanie Storey
- Production locations: New York City, New York
- Editors: James Crowe; Clark Burnett
- Running time: 41–42 minutes
- Production companies: Greengrass Productions; El Dorado Pictures

Original release
- Network: ABC
- Release: March 4 – December 29, 2018

The Alec Baldwin Show is an American talk show hosted by actor Alec Baldwin that premiered on March 4, 2018, on ABC. The series was Baldwin's second talk show following 2013's Up Late with Alec Baldwin on MSNBC and the first prime-time personality talk show to air on a major broadcast network since NBC's The Jay Leno Show ended its run in 2010.

== Premise ==
Similar in format to the Tom Snyder talk show Tomorrow, The Alec Baldwin Show was slated to "include two interviews per show, sans audience, letting them collectively stretch the entire hour, save commercial breaks. Like his podcast, which featured lengthy conversations with everyone from Barbra Streisand to Anthony Weiner." The show was to "line up actors, comedians, politicians and other newsmakers in the American pop culture sphere as guests."

== Production ==
=== Development ===
It's longer, and it's not a pre-produced segment on the couch of a talk show—which is nearly always promotional. The watchword for me is origins. I like to talk to people about their origins. How did they grow up, and how were they primed for this kind of work? How did Jerry Seinfeld become Jerry Seinfeld? I think that's inspiring for artists and performers. I want to get people on there who are political figures and talk about their origins, too. I know everybody says Obama is somebody they'd like to talk to. Letterman had him on. But I've got a whole other set of questions.

— Host Alec Baldwin on what makes his show stand out amongst the crowded talk show landscape

On February 27, 2018, it was announced that ABC had given a series order to what was then titled Sundays with Alec Baldwin, a new talk show television series created and presented by Alec Baldwin. The series order was reportedly for a first season of nine episodes. The pilot episode aired (with its original name) after the 90th Academy Awards as a "sneak peek" on March 4, 2018. Production companies involved in the series included Baldwin's company El Dorado Pictures.

In an interview with The Hollywood Reporter's Lacey Rose, Baldwin went on to elaborate on his reasons for committing to the program. He explained how the limited number of episodes allowed for greater freedom and discretion when it comes to selecting guests. He specified the type of guests they were looking for saying, "The idea of doing a TV show was never really that attractive to me—because when we do the show for radio, it's one kind of reality. The minute you put a camera on people, they change...Why don't we try it and see if we get people who are more camera-ready? I wouldn't mind interviewing Jennifer Lawrence or somebody if we could find an angle that was different or fresh."

Notable personalities that Baldwin mentioned as possible guests included Stephen King, Al Pacino, Robert De Niro, Jack Nicholson, Dustin Hoffman, and Bruce Springsteen.

== Marketing ==
On March 2, 2018, ABC released the first clips and photographs from the series.

== Broadcast history ==
On May 15, 2018, it was announced that the series, now retitled The Alec Baldwin Show, would officially premiere in the fall of 2018 and air on Sundays at 10 PM

On October 9, 2018, it was announced that the first formal episode of the series was scheduled to premiere on October 14, 2018, and that Robert De Niro and Taraji P. Henson would serve as guests. Subsequent guests were expected to include Kim Kardashian, Robert F. Kennedy Jr., RuPaul, Kerry Washington, Cecile Richards, Jeff Bridges, Sarah Jessica Parker, Chris Christie, Mike Myers, Regina King, Gloria Allred, Ricky Gervais, and Erna Solberg.

On November 6, 2018, it was announced that ABC was moving the series from Sunday nights at 10 PM to a new time slot on Saturdays at 10 PM. The show was expected to return in its new time slot on December 8, 2018.

On January 4, 2019, it was reported that ABC was pulling the show from its schedule and replacing it with reruns of other shows beginning the following night. The remaining two episodes of the series never aired.

== Episodes ==
=== Pilot ===
Title	Featured guest(s)	Original release date	U.S. viewers (millions)
"Sundays with Alec Baldwin"	Jerry Seinfeld & Kate McKinnon	March 4, 2018	3.645

=== Season 1 (2018–19) ===
No.	Featured guest(s)	Original release date	U.S. viewers (millions)
1	"Robert De Niro & Taraji P. Henson"	October 14, 2018	2.073
2	"Kim Kardashian West"	October 21, 2018	1.958
3	"Ricky Gervais & Jeff Bridges"	October 28, 2018	1.495
4	"Mike Myers & Cecile Richards"	November 4, 2018	1.469
5	"Sarah Jessica Parker"	December 8, 2018	1.053
6	"Kerry Washington & Robert F. Kennedy Jr."	December 15, 2018	0.973
7	"RuPaul & Erna Solberg"	December 22, 2018	1.017
8	"Regina King & Gloria Allred"	December 29, 2018	0.852
9	"Jerry Seinfeld (O: January 5, 2019)"	N/A	N/A
10	"Chris Christie & Ana Navarro"	N/A	N/A

== Reception ==
The series has been met with a negative response from critics upon its premiere. On the review aggregation website Rotten Tomatoes, the series holds a 0% approval rating, with an average rating of 3.72 out of 10 based on 7 reviews.

Upon airing, the pilot episode was met with a mixed response from critics. Metacritic, which uses a weighted average, assigned Sundays with Alec Baldwin a score of 47 out of 100 based on five critics, indicating "mixed or average reviews".

In a positive review, Verne Gay of Newsday offered the pilot praise giving it two and a half stars out of four, commenting on its potential, saying, "Baldwin is the sort of star—either actor, talk show host, POTUS, whatever—who elicits passion. Some people love him, others not so much. There's no middle ground and never has been, and into this no man's land he steps, along with future guests. Nobody's neutral about him, and their neutrality will be tested as much as his. The show's potential will rise or fall in those edgy encounters when they come, and they certainly should. That passion could ultimately be Sundays' chief asset."

In a more negative critique, Kelly Lawler of USA Today said of the pilot, "Baldwin, who had a short-lived talk show on MSNBC in 2013, is a decent interviewer, but the talk never gets too deep or reveals new insights about his subjects" and that he "tries his level best, but the show is too slight to really click. It just might not be his Sunday."
