= Alec Baldwin =

American actor (born 1958)

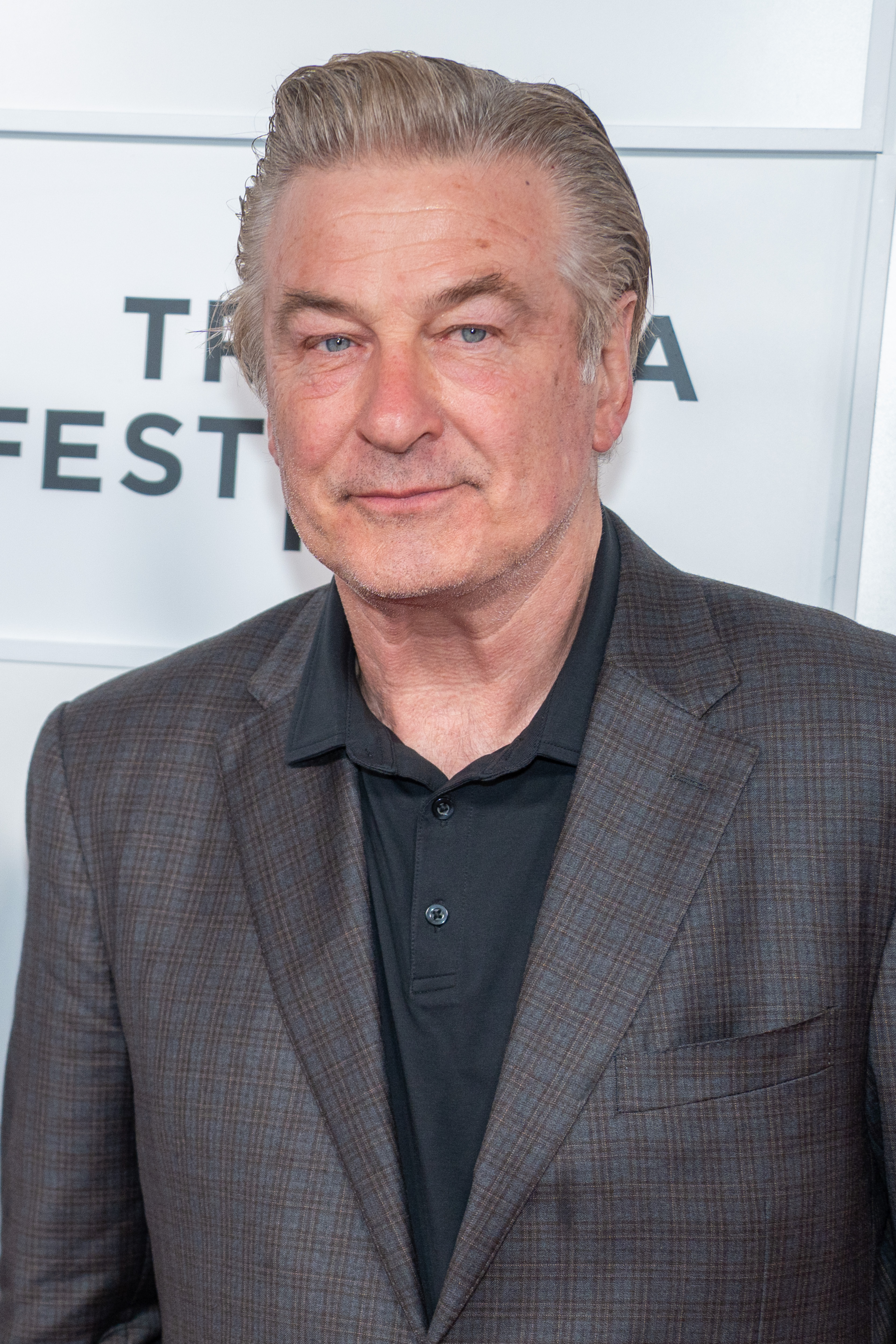
- Baldwin in 2026
- Born: Alexander Rae Baldwin III; April 3, 1958 (age 68); Amityville, New York, U.S.
- Education: New York University (BFA)
- Occupations: Actor; producer
- Years active: 1980–present
- Works: Filmography
- Political party: Democratic
- Spouses: Kim Basinger (m. 1993; div. 2002); Hilaria Thomas (m. 2012)
- Children: 8, including Ireland
- Family: Baldwin family
- Awards: Full list
- Website: alecbaldwin.com

Alexander Rae Baldwin III (born April 3, 1958) is an American actor and film producer. He is known for his leading and supporting roles in a variety of genres, from comedy to drama. Baldwin has received numerous accolades, including three Primetime Emmy Awards, three Golden Globe Awards and eight Actor Awards as well as nominations for an Academy Award, a BAFTA Award, and Tony Award.

A member of the Baldwin family, Baldwin's film career began with a string of roles in 1988 in films such as Beetlejuice, Working Girl and Married to the Mob before playing Jack Ryan in The Hunt for Red October (1990). He was Oscar-nominated for playing a casino manager in The Cooler (2003) and BAFTA-nominated for playing a charming ex-husband in It's Complicated (2010). He has acted in films such as Glengarry Glen Ross (1992), The Royal Tenenbaums (2001), Along Came Polly (2004), The Aviator (2004), The Departed (2006), and Blue Jasmine (2013) as well as two Mission: Impossible films: Rogue Nation (2015) and Fallout (2018). From 2017 to 2021, he voiced the titular role in The Boss Baby film franchise. From 1999 to 2003, he narrated the American dub for seasons 5 and 6 of Thomas & Friends.

From 2006 to 2013, Baldwin received critical acclaim starring alongside Tina Fey as Jack Donaghy on the NBC sitcom 30 Rock, winning two Primetime Emmy Awards, three Golden Globe Awards, and seven Screen Actors Guild Awards for Best Actor in a comedy series. (Note: making him the male performer with the most SAG Awards in history.) Baldwin has hosted the NBC sketch series Saturday Night Live a record 17 times since 1990. There he earned critical acclaim for his portrayal of Donald Trump on the show, a role that won him his third Primetime Emmy in 2017 and nominations in 2018 and 2021.

In 2024, he starred in the Western film Rust, which gained media attention for a shooting incident in 2021, wherein cinematographer Halyna Hutchins was shot and killed when Baldwin accidentally discharged a live round from a revolver that he was using as a prop. Baldwin, his wife Hilaria, and their seven children are the focus of the related TLC reality series The Baldwins.

Baldwin made his Broadway debut in Loot (1986) and was later nominated for the Tony Award for Best Actor in a Play for his portrayal of Stanley Kowalski in A Streetcar Named Desire (1992). He returned to Broadway in Twentieth Century (2004) and Orphans (2013). He hosted the Academy Awards in 2010 and the game show Match Game from 2016 to 2021. He was also a columnist for The Huffington Post.

== Early life and education ==
Alexander Rae Baldwin III was born on April 3, 1958, in Amityville, New York, and raised in the Nassau Shores neighborhood of nearby Massapequa, the eldest son of Carol Newcomb (née Martineau; December 15, 1929 – May 26, 2022) from Syracuse, New York and Alexander Rae Baldwin Jr. (October 26, 1927 – April 15, 1983), a high school history/social studies teacher and football coach from Brooklyn. His maternal grandfather, Daniel Roy Martineau, played football at Syracuse and later played professionally in the National Football League for the Buffalo All-Americans and the Rochester Jeffersons. He has three younger brothers, Daniel (b. 1960), William (b. 1963), and Stephen (b. 1966), who also became actors. He also has two sisters, Elizabeth "Beth" Keuchler (née Baldwin; born 1955) and Jane Ann Sasso (née Baldwin; born 1965).

Alec and his siblings were raised as Catholics. They are of Irish, French, and English ancestry. Through his father, Baldwin is descended from Mayflower passenger John Howland, and through this line, is the 13th generation of his family born in North America and the 14th generation to live in North America.

Baldwin attended Alfred G. Berner High School in Massapequa and played football there under Coach Bob Reifsnyder. From 1976 to 1979, he attended George Washington University. In 1979, he lost the election for student body president and received a personal letter from former U.S. president Richard Nixon encouraging him to use the loss as a learning experience.

Afterward, he transferred to the Tisch School of the Arts of New York University (NYU) where he studied with, among others, Geoffrey Horne and Mira Rostova at the Lee Strasberg Theatre Institute. Later, he was accepted as a member of the Actors Studio. In New York City, Baldwin also worked as a busboy at the famed discotheque, Studio 54. In 1994, he completed his Bachelor of Fine Arts degree at NYU.

== Career ==
=== 1980–1992: Rise to prominence ===
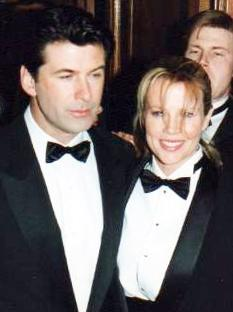
Baldwin with Kim Basinger at the 1994 César Awards, Paris

Baldwin's first acting role was as Billy Aldrich in the NBC daytime soap opera The Doctors from August 20, 1980, to 1982. In the fall of 1983, he starred in the short-lived television series Cutter to Houston. Baldwin made his television movie debut playing the titular Sheriff Ed Cassaday in The Sheriff and the Astronaut (1984). He went on to appear as the brother of Valene Ewing and son of Lilimae Clements (played by Joan Van Ark and Julie Harris, respectively) in Knots Landing from 1984 to 1985. In 1986, Baldwin starred in Dress Gray, a four-hour made-for-television miniseries, as an honest cadet sergeant who tries to solve the mystery of a murdered gay classmate. Baldwin made his Broadway debut in 1986 in a revival of Joe Orton's Loot alongside Zoë Wanamaker, Željko Ivanek, Joseph Maher, and Charles Keating. This production closed after three months.

Baldwin made his feature film debut with a minor role in the 1987 comedy-mystery Forever, Lulu. In 1988, he rose to prominence acting in five major films. He starred in Tim Burton fantasy horror comedy Beetlejuice (1988) opposite Michael Keaton and Geena Davis. He had supporting roles in the Mike Nichols romantic comedy Working Girl and Jonathan Demme's crime comedy Married to the Mob. He also co-starred in Oliver Stone's drama Talk Radio opposite Eric Bogosian and in the John Hughes romantic drama She's Having a Baby with Kevin Bacon and Elizabeth McGovern.

He gained further recognition as a leading man with his role as Jack Ryan opposite Sean Connery in The Hunt for Red October (1990). The film became the sixth-highest-grossing domestic film of the year, collecting $122 million in North America and more than $200 million worldwide. That same year, he also starred in the black comedy crime film Miami Blues alongside Jennifer Jason Leigh and Fred Ward. Baldwin met his future wife Kim Basinger when they played lovers in the 1991 film The Marrying Man. Next, Baldwin played a ferocious sales executive in Glengarry Glen Ross (1992), a part added to the film version of David Mamet's Pulitzer Prize-winning stage play (including the monologue "Coffee's for closers"). Later that same year, he starred in Prelude to a Kiss with Meg Ryan, which was based on the Broadway play. The film received a lukewarm reception by critics and grossed only $22 million worldwide.

=== 1993–2005: Established actor ===
He appeared with Basinger again in The Getaway, a 1994 remake of the 1972 Steve McQueen film of the same name. Also, in 1994, Baldwin made a foray into pulp fiction-based movies with the role of the title character in The Shadow. The film made $48 million. In 1996 and 1997, he starred in several more thrillers, including The Edge, The Juror, and Ghosts of Mississippi. His other Broadway credits include Caryl Churchill's Serious Money with Kate Nelligan and a revival of Tennessee Williams' A Streetcar Named Desire, for which his performance as Stanley Kowalski garnered a Tony Award nomination for Best Actor. Baldwin also received an Emmy nomination for the 1995 television version of the production, in which both he and Jessica Lange reprised their roles, alongside John Goodman and Diane Lane. In 1998, Baldwin played the title role in Macbeth at The Public Theater alongside Angela Bassett and Liev Schreiber in a production directed by George C. Wolfe. From 1998 to 2002, he became the third American narrator and George Carlin's replacement for the fifth and sixth seasons of Thomas & Friends. Baldwin wrote an episode of Law & Order entitled "Tabloid", which aired in 1998. In 2000, he played Mr. Conductor in the Thomas & Friends film Thomas and the Magic Railroad. In 2003, he acted in The Cat in the Hat.

In 2002, Baldwin appeared in two episodes of Friends as Phoebe's overly enthusiastic love interest, Parker. He also portrayed a recurring character in several seasons 7 and 8 episodes of Will & Grace, in which he played Malcolm, a "top secret agent" and the lover of Karen Walker (Megan Mullally). He also guest-starred in the first live episode of the series. He played Dr. Barrett Moore, a retired plastic surgeon, in the series Nip/Tuck. Baldwin shifted towards character acting, beginning with 2001's Pearl Harbor, in which he played Lt. Col. Jimmy Doolittle. With a worldwide box office of $449,220,945, this film remains the highest-grossing film Baldwin has appeared in during his acting career. Baldwin directed and starred in The Devil and Daniel Webster with Anthony Hopkins, Jennifer Love Hewitt and Dan Aykroyd in 2001. The then-unreleased film became an asset in a federal bank fraud trial when investor Jed Barron was convicted of bank fraud while the movie was in production. The film was eventually acquired by The Yari Group without Baldwin's involvement.

Baldwin was nominated for an Academy Award, a Golden Globe, and the Screen Actors Guild Award for Best Actor for his performance in the 2003 gambling drama The Cooler. He received acclaim for the role with Roger Ebert writing, "This is one of Alec Baldwin's best performances, as a character who contains vast contradictions. He can be kind and brutal simultaneously; affection and cruelty are handmaidens". Baldwin collaborated with Martin Scorsese portraying Juan Trippe in the biographical drama The Aviator (2004) and Capt. George Ellerby in the crime drama The Departed (2006). In 2004, Baldwin starred in a revival of Broadway's Twentieth Century about a successful and egomaniacal Broadway director (Baldwin), who has transformed a chorus girl (Anne Heche) into a leading lady. Charles Isherwood of Variety gave the production a mixed review writing of Baldwin's performance, "Baldwin is an earthy actor with a natural contemporary style, and his hoity-toity faux-British accent sounds more off-key than it should".

On June 9, 2005, he appeared in a concert version of the Rodgers and Hammerstein musical South Pacific at Carnegie Hall. He starred as Luther Billis, alongside Reba McEntire as Nellie and Brian Stokes Mitchell as Emile. PBS taped and telecast the production on April 26, 2006. In 2006, he starred in the film Mini's First Time. He performed opposite Sarah Michelle Gellar in Suburban Girl (2007).

=== 2006–2013: Career resurgence with 30 Rock ===
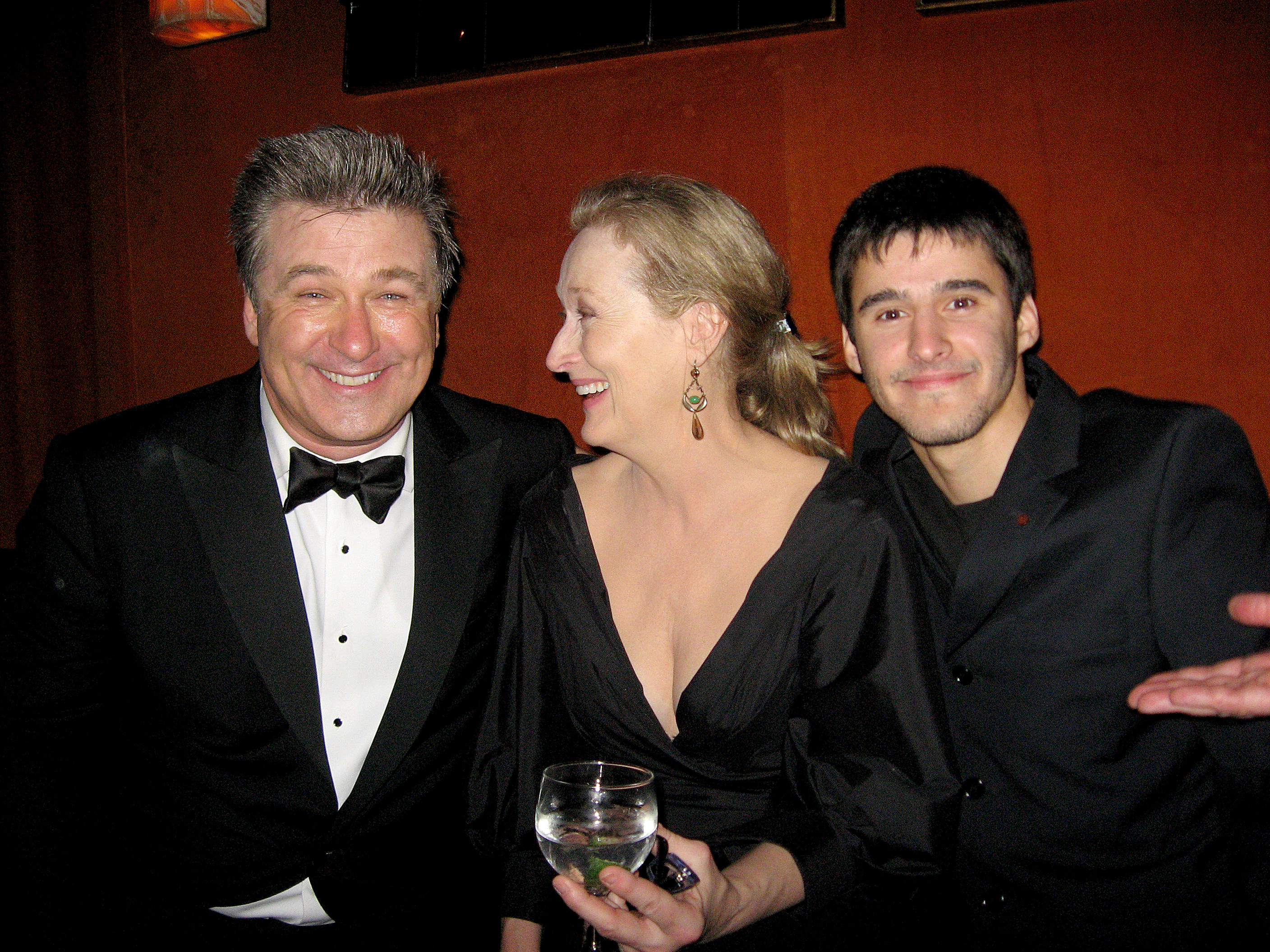
Baldwin with Meryl Streep and Josh Wood in 2009

In 2006, Baldwin made theater news in Roundabout Theatre Company's Off-Broadway revival of Joe Orton's Entertaining Mr. Sloane. In 2010, Baldwin starred opposite Sam Underwood in a critically acclaimed revival of Peter Shaffer's Equus, directed by Tony Walton at Guild Hall in East Hampton, New York. In 2007, the Yari Film Group announced that it would give the film, now titled Shortcut to Happiness, a theatrical release in the spring, and cable film network Starz! announced that it had acquired pay TV rights for the film. Shortcut to Happiness was finally released in 2008. Baldwin displeased with the way the film had been cut in post-production, demanded that his directorial credit be changed to the pseudonym "Harry Kirkpatrick".

He starred as Jack Donaghy on NBC's 30 Rock, which first aired in October 2006. He met his future co-stars Tina Fey and Tracy Morgan while appearing on Saturday Night Live. Since season 3, Baldwin was credited as one of 30 Rock's producers. Barry Garron of The Hollywood Reporter praised Baldwin's character writing, "Donaghy is a perfect example of what's right with this show." Baldwin has won three Primetime Emmy Awards for Outstanding Lead Actor in a Comedy Series, two Golden Globe awards and seven Screen Actors Guild Awards for his role. He received his second Emmy nomination in 2008, marking his seventh Primetime Emmy nomination and first win. He won again in 2009.

Baldwin co-authored the book A Promise to Ourselves: A Journey Through Fatherhood and Divorce with Mark Tabb in 2008. Baldwin joined TCM's The Essentials Robert Osborne as co-host beginning in March 2009. In 2008, he had a voice role as the main antagonist in the DreamWorks Animated film Madagascar: Escape 2 Africa. In 2009, he appeared in a series of commercials for Hulu that premiered during the Super Bowl broadcast. On January 12, 2009, Baldwin became the host of The New York Philharmonic This Week, the nationally syndicated radio series of the New York Philharmonic. He has recorded two nationally distributed public service radio announcements on behalf of the Save the Manatee Club. In 2010, he made a five-second cameo appearance with comedian Andy Samberg in a musical video titled "Great Day" featured on the bonus DVD as part of Lonely Island's album Turtleneck & Chain.

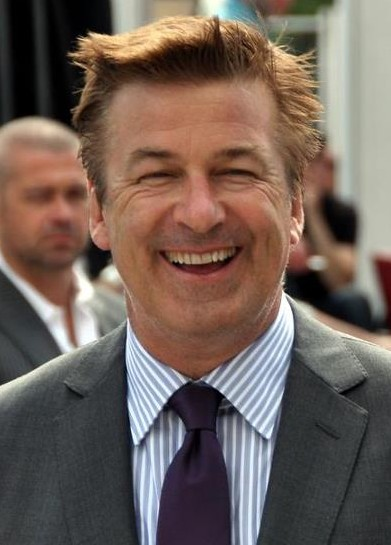
Baldwin in 2012

Baldwin co-starred in the hit romantic comedy It's Complicated (2009) with Meryl Streep and Steve Martin. Together Streep and Baldwin received positive reviews for their on-screen chemistry. Manohla Dargis of The New York Times wrote, "Mr. Baldwin does with Jake, who, with his shark smiles and thrusting gut, beautifully conveys male vanity in its twilight". Kirk Honeycut of The Associated Press wrote, "Baldwin has developed a second career in films and television by more or less spoofing his macho image". Baldwin went on to receive a nomination for the BAFTA Award for Best Supporting Actor for his performance. That same year, Baldwin co-hosted the 82nd Academy Awards with Steve Martin in 2010. The Boston Globe television critic Matthew Gilbert lauded the hosts performance saying that "The delivery was expert and warmly conversational, like one of those old-school comedy teams."

He has hosted Saturday Night Live 17 times as of February 11, 2017, and holds the record for most times hosting the show. On October 24, 2011, WNYC public radio released the first episode of Baldwin's podcast Here's the Thing, a series of interviews with public figures including artists, policy-makers, and performers. The first two episodes featured actor Michael Douglas and political consultant Ed Rollins. Between 2011 and 2020, Baldwin completed more than 150 interviews, with guests who included musician Wynton Marsalis, filmmaker Edward Norton, comedian David Letterman, violinist Itzhak Perlman, and pianist Lang Lang, among many others. Here's the Thing was developed for Baldwin by Lu Olkowski, Trey Kay, Kathy Russo, and Emily Botein. On February 4, 2012, he hosted the 2011 NFL Honors awards show. He later hosted the second show on February 2, 2013.

Baldwin returned to Broadway as Harold in Orphans. The show, which opened April 18, 2013, was also to have starred Shia LaBeouf as Treat, but LaBeouf left the production in rehearsals and was replaced by Ben Foster. Marilyn Stasio of Variety described Baldwin's performance as being "executed with humor and compassion". That same year Baldwin briefly hosted Up Late with Alec Baldwin on MSNBC. On November 26, 2013, the program was cancelled after only five episodes, due in part to a street tirade captured on video, in which he allegedly called the videographer a "cocksucking fag". Baldwin denied that he used the word "fag", and later cited this incident as a major turning point in his public life. Beginning in 2010, Baldwin appeared in a television campaign for Capital One as their spokesperson. Following the 2013 confrontation with a videographer, his contract was not renewed, and he was succeeded in the campaign by Jennifer Garner.

=== 2014–present ===
Baldwin co-starred in Mission: Impossible – Rogue Nation, the fifth installment of the Mission: Impossible series, released on July 31, 2015, and reprised the role in Mission: Impossible – Fallout, released on July 27, 2018. In 2016, Baldwin began hosting a reboot of the game show Match Game on ABC. That same year Baldwin gained acclaim and notoriety for his portrayal of Republican nominee Donald Trump during SNL's coverage of the 2016 presidential election, to critical acclaim. In 2017, he won the Primetime Emmy Award for Outstanding Supporting Actor in a Comedy Series for his portrayal of Trump. Baldwin continued in the role until Trump's defeat in the 2020 election.

In 2017, he took over as sole host of TCM's The Essentials following the death of his co-host, Robert Osborne. In August 2017, Baldwin's production company, El Dorado Pictures, signed a first-look deal with ABC Studios. His 2017 memoir Nevertheless debuted at No. 5 on The New York Times hardcover nonfiction best-seller list. On March 3, 2018, following the broadcast of the 90th Academy Awards, ABC broadcast a preview episode of the talk show The Alec Baldwin Show, at the time called Sundays With Alec Baldwin, scheduled to formally debut with a nine-episode order that fall. On August 27, 2018, it was announced that Baldwin would join the cast for Joker, playing Thomas Wayne, father of Bruce Wayne. Later, on August 29, 2018, Baldwin withdrew from the role. That same year, Baldwin made cameo appearances in Spike Lee's historical drama BlacKkKlansman and Bradley Cooper's musical drama A Star Is Born as Dr. Kennebrew Beaureguard and himself, respectively. That same year, he guest-starred as George Tenet in the Hulu miniseries The Looming Tower.

Baldwin was the subject of the 2019 edition of the Comedy Central Roast, which included a surprise appearance by his daughter Ireland among the roastees. In 2021, Baldwin starred opposite Jamie Dornan and Christian Slater in the miniseries Dr. Death on Peacock. He has a voice cameo as himself interviewing Lydia Tár played by Cate Blanchett in Tár (2022), directed by Todd Field. In 2023, Baldwin appeared in a cameo role in a Saturday Night Live sketch spoofing the Calm app. In 2024, he returned to Saturday Night Live playing Brett Baier opposite Maya Rudolph as Kamala Harris spoofing a Fox News interview in the cold open sketch, and later portrayed Robert F. Kennedy Jr. in a cold open sketch about Donald Trump's recent Cabinet picks following his win in the 2024 presidential election.

== Acting credits and accolades ==
Baldwin has also received a number of awards and nominations throughout his career for stage, television, and film roles. He has been nominated for the Academy Award, BAFTA Award, and Tony Award and has received three Primetime Emmy Awards, three Golden Globe Awards, and eight Screen Actors Guild Awards.

On May 12, 2010, Baldwin gave a commencement address at New York University and was awarded a Doctor of Fine Arts degree, honoris causa.

Baldwin was named Esteemed Faculty by Stony Brook University after teaching a master class in acting at Stony Brook Southampton.

== Philanthropy ==
Baldwin and his mother Carol created the Carol M. Baldwin Cancer Research Fund in 1996, and dedicated the Carol M. Baldwin Breast Care Center at the Stony Brook University Hospital in her honor. During his 2010–2013 stint as a spokesperson for Capital One, Baldwin's contract was written to fund Baldwin's charity foundation. He was paid $15 million over nearly five years. After taxes and accounting fees, the remainder, $14.125 million, was given to charity.

In March 2011, Baldwin donated $1 million to the New York Philharmonic (on whose board he served), and $500,000 to the Roundabout Theatre Company, where he has performed plays in New York. In recent years, his foundation has donated bookstore gift certificates to Long Island libraries to support literacy programs.

== Personal life ==
Baldwin was briefly engaged in 1983 to actress Janine Turner. He also dated Lori Loughlin, Lori Singer, Holly Gagnier and Jennifer Love Hewitt.

=== Marriages ===
==== Kim Basinger ====
In 1990, Baldwin met actress Kim Basinger when they played lovers in the film The Marrying Man. They married on August 19, 1993, and had a daughter, Ireland (born October 23, 1995). They separated on December 5, 2000 and divorced on September 3, 2002. Baldwin has called the attorneys in the case "opportunists", and characterized Basinger's psychologists as part of the "divorce industry". In his memoir, he blamed them more than Basinger, writing, "She is a person, like many of us, doing the best she can with what she has."

In his memoir, Baldwin stated that these issues placed stress on his relationship with his daughter. Baldwin wrote that he had to spend over a million dollars, put time aside from his career, travel extensively, and find a house in California, having previously lived in New York, in order to stay in his daughter's life.

On April 11, 2007, he left a voicemail message in response to an unanswered arranged call, in which he called his 11-year-old daughter a "rude, thoughtless little pig". The tape was sold to TMZ, which published the recording despite laws against publishing media related to a minor without the permission of both parents. Baldwin described the incident as a mistake that did not make him a bad parent. During an interview with Playboy in June 2009, he stated that he contemplated suicide after the voicemail leaked to the public but sought professional help. He stated that he felt Basinger would have considered it "a victory" if he committed suicide and that it was her "avowed goal" to destroy him.

In late 2008, Baldwin toured in support of his book on fatherhood and divorce.

In May 2023, Baldwin became a grandfather when Ireland had a baby girl with musician RAC (André Allen Anjos).

==== Hilaria Baldwin ====
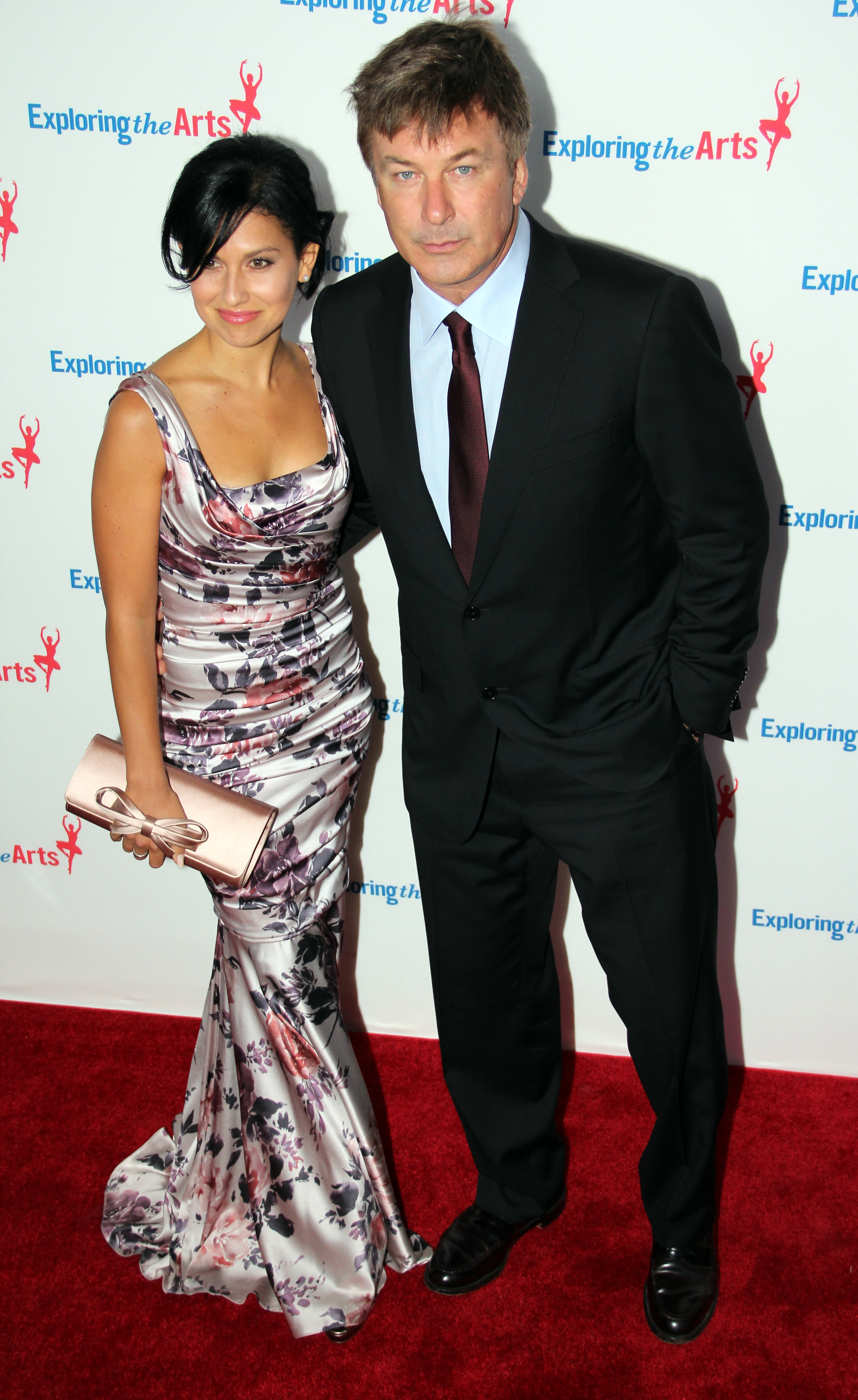
Baldwin with Hilaria Hayward-Thomas in 2011

By August 2011, Baldwin began dating Hilaria Thomas, a yoga instructor with Yoga Vida in Manhattan. Baldwin and Thomas moved from the Upper West Side to Greenwich Village that August. The couple became engaged in April 2012 and married on June 30, 2012, at St. Patrick's Old Cathedral in New York City. They have seven children together. In 2024 the Baldwin family taped a reality show, The Baldwins, which premiered on February 23, 2025, on TLC.

=== Health and dieting ===
Baldwin and his wife are pescatarians who eat a predominantly plant-based diet with fish and eggs. Baldwin gave up eating beef in 1991 and is a supporter of People for the Ethical Treatment of Animals. In 2019, he authored an article for CNN supporting the EAT-Lancet report and recommended a plant-based diet due to global environmental issues.

Baldwin has discussed his experiences with Lyme disease.

== 2021 Rust shooting ==
On October 21, 2021, Baldwin was filming on the set of the then-upcoming film Rust, of which he was also a producer, at the Bonanza Creek Ranch in Santa Fe, New Mexico, when he discharged a gun being used as a prop, killing cinematographer Halyna Hutchins and injuring director Joel Souza. The Hutchins family filed a wrongful death suit against Baldwin for his part in the fatal shooting. On October 5, 2022, Baldwin reached an undisclosed settlement with Hutchins' family in their wrongful death lawsuit. In March 2024, court documents were filed indicating the producers of Rust (including Baldwin) were nine months late in paying agreed settlement fees to the widower and son of Halyna Hutchins. As of November 2024, one of the two payments had been made.

Baldwin was charged with two counts of involuntary manslaughter on January 31, 2023. The elevated second charge was eventually dropped after his lawyers argued that he was being incorrectly charged with a version of the law that was not passed until months after the shooting. On February 23, he pleaded not guilty to involuntary manslaughter. In April, lawyers for Baldwin announced that the criminal charges against him had been dropped by prosecutors. On October 17, 2023, New Mexico special prosecutors announced that their findings indicated that Baldwin may be guilty of involuntary manslaughter.

In January 2024, a grand jury indicted Baldwin on an involuntary manslaughter charge. The indictment provided prosecutors with two options for pursuing this charge: one based on negligent use of a firearm, and the other for felony misconduct "with the total disregard or indifference for the safety of others." On May 24, Santa Fe-based Judge Mary Marlowe Sommer denied a motion which was filed by Baldwin to dismiss his trial, thus clearing the way for the trial to begin. Baldwin's trial began in Santa Fe on July 9. On July 12, Sommer dismissed the case against Baldwin with prejudice because the prosecution had withheld evidence from the defense. Sommer found that "Santa Fe County Sheriff's officer made the decision – and apparently also with the prosecutor ... that the evidence was of no evidentiary value and failed to connect the evidence to the case", such that the "willful withholding of this information was intentional and deliberate", and if not done in bad faith, came so close to bad faith as to display "signs of scorching prejudice". On October 25, Judge Sommer upheld her dismissal.

In January 2025, Baldwin filed a civil rights suit against officials in Santa Fe, New Mexico, alleging that he was wrongfully prosecuted for manslaughter in the death of Halyna Hutchins. The Court dismissed the lawsuit in July 2025 because Baldwin and his lawyers had not taken steps to move the case forward.

The Trial of Alec Baldwin, a documentary directed by Rory Kennedy that follows Baldwin, the case, and trial, had its world premiere at DOC NYC in November 2025. Kennedy stated in an affidavit that Baldwin did not approach or commission the project, nor did he have creative or editorial control. Kennedy was denied access to the production of Rust as producers felt Baldwin was pursuing the project in order to "exonerate" himself, with director Joel Souza declining to sit for an interview.

== Political views ==
Baldwin is a Democrat and endorsed Barack Obama in his two presidential campaigns. He serves on the board of People for the American Way. He is an animal rights activist and a staunch supporter of PETA, for which he has done work that includes narrating the video entitled Meet Your Meat. Baldwin lent his support to the Save the Manatee Club by donating his time to record several public service announcements for the group, which had contacted him following his role in "The Bonfire of the Manatees", an episode of The Simpsons in which he was the voice of a biologist working to save the endangered mammals. Baldwin also gave his support for Farm Sanctuary's Adopt A Turkey Project and stated, "At least 46 million turkeys suffer heartbreaking fear and pain before being killed each and every Thanksgiving..."

In a couple of letters to The East Hampton Star in 1998, he called New York Governor George Pataki either a liar or incredibly stupid and asked whether Kenneth Starr was a psychopath.

During his appearance on the comedy late night show Late Night with Conan O'Brien on December 11, 1998, eight days before President Bill Clinton was to be impeached, Baldwin gave a staged rant, meant as satire, "If we were in another country ... we would stone Henry Hyde to death and we would go to their homes and kill their wives and their children. We would kill their families, for what they're doing to this country." At the end of his rant, O'Brien pulled out an oxygen mask and put it over Baldwin's mouth to calm Baldwin down. Baldwin later apologized to Hyde for any misunderstanding, and the network explained that it was meant as a joke and promised not to re-run it.

Baldwin said in a 2006 interview with The New York Times that if he did become involved in electoral politics, he would prefer to run for Governor of New York. When asked if he was qualified for the office, Baldwin responded that he considered himself more qualified than California Governor Arnold Schwarzenegger. On December 21, 2011, Baldwin, addressing speculation, said he was abandoning plans to run for mayor of New York City and would instead continue in his role on 30 Rock. That April, he suggested he might change his mind, saying, "Let's see what things are like in 2014. I would love to do it."

In February 2009, Baldwin spoke out to encourage state leaders to renew New York's tax break for the film and television industry, stating that if the "tax breaks are not reinstated into the budget, film production in this town is going to collapse and television production is going to collapse and it's all going to go to California".

During the 63rd Primetime Emmy Awards in 2011, televised by Fox, Baldwin was slated to appear in a taped skit. However, the producers of the show cut a portion of the skit containing a reference to Rupert Murdoch and the News International phone hacking scandal. Baldwin subsequently boycotted the Emmy Awards and requested that his entire appearance be removed from the broadcast. Producers complied and he was replaced with Leonard Nimoy.
