= Baldwin family =

American stage family

The Baldwin family is an American family of professional performers, including the four brothers Alec, Daniel, William, and Stephen.

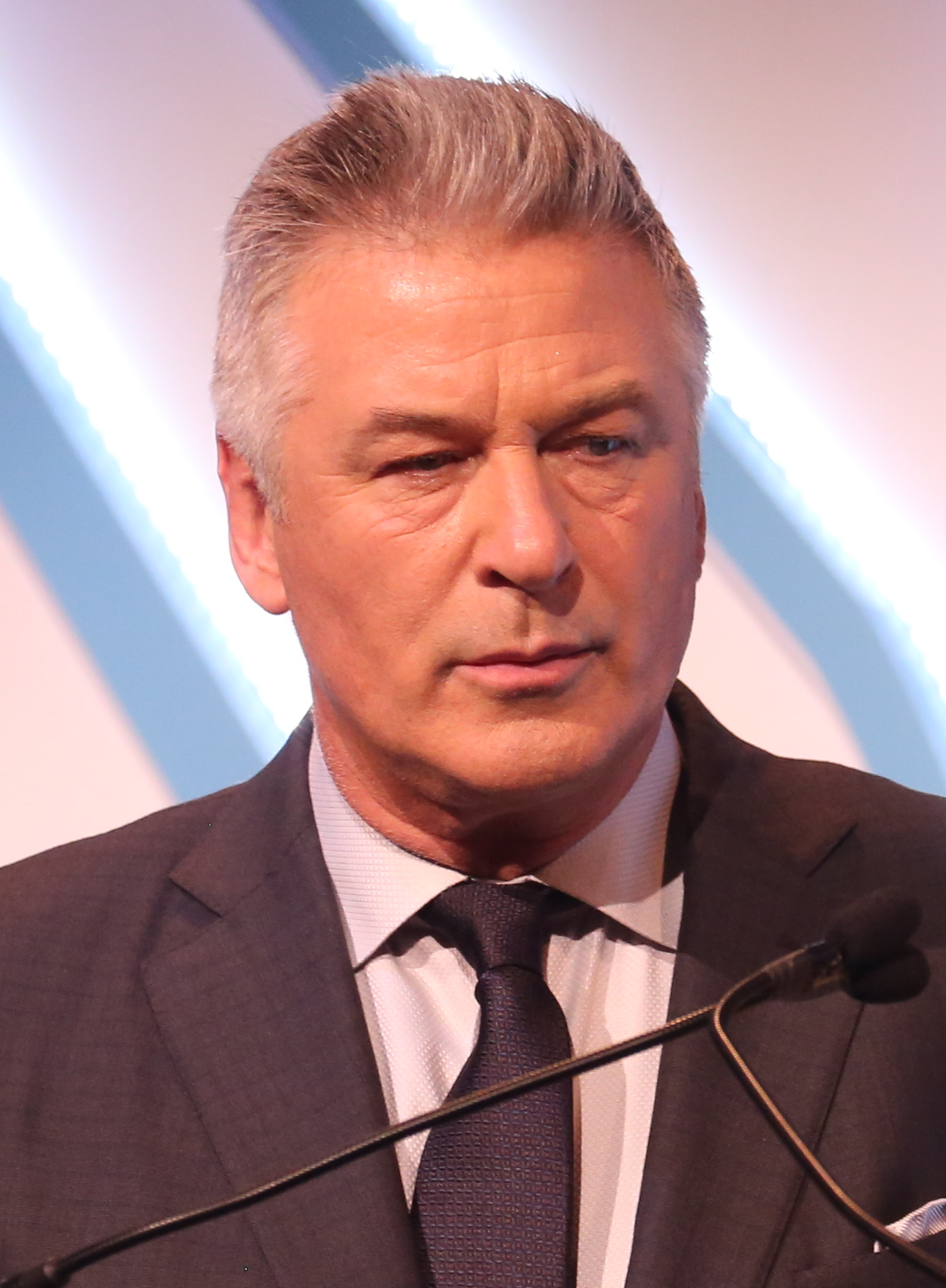
Alec Baldwin

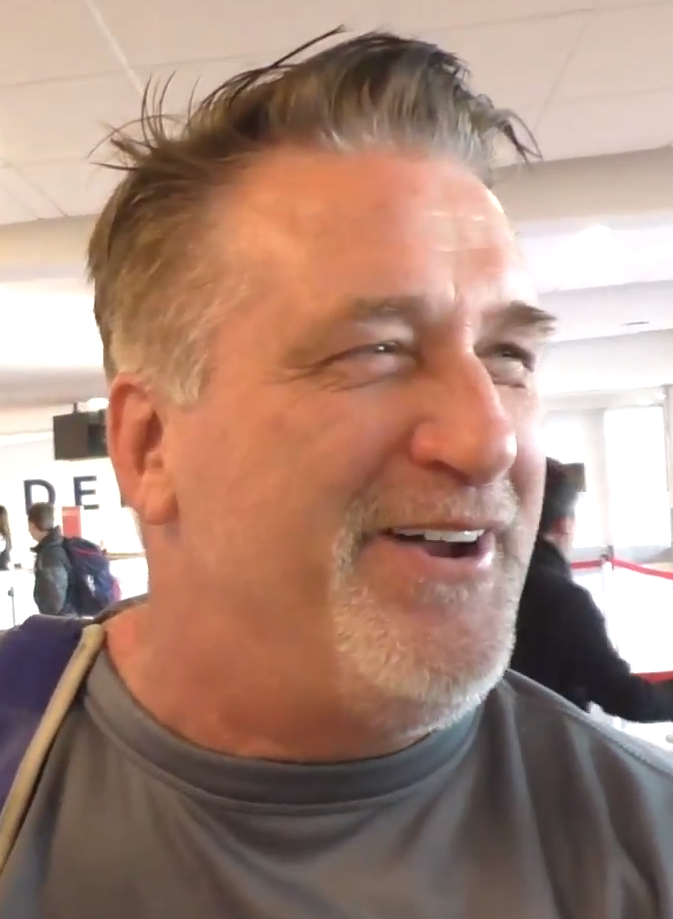
Daniel Baldwin

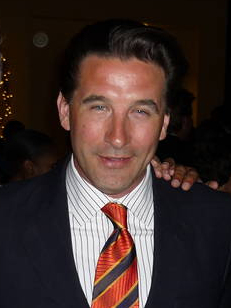
William Baldwin

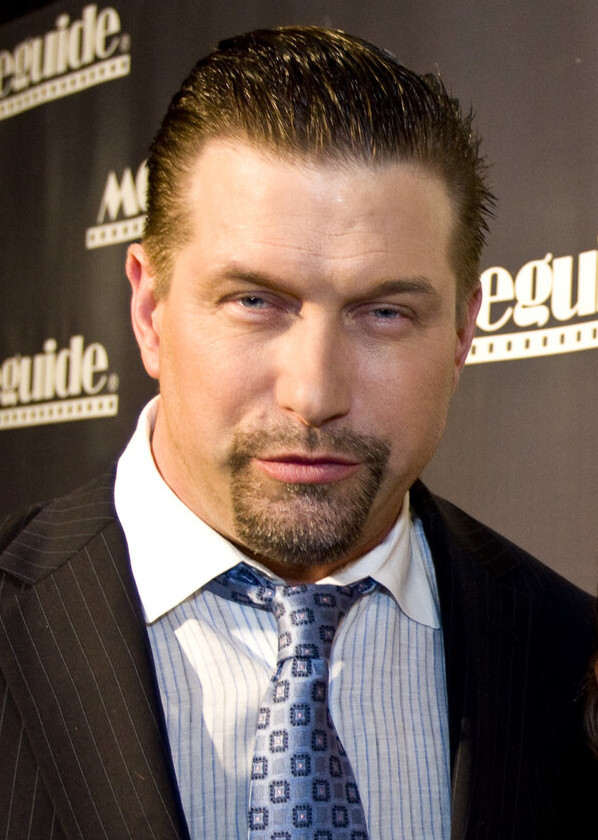
Stephen Baldwin

== Ancestry ==
The Baldwin family’s patrilineal line traces to a Richard Baldwin, who lived in England in the 1500s. Through their father, Alexander Rae Baldwin Jr., the Baldwin brothers are descended from the Mayflower passengers John Howland and Elizabeth Tilley, as well as from William Bradford through their maternal grandfather, Daniel LeRoy Martineau. The four brothers are therefore the 13th generation of their family to be born in North America.

== Members ==
- The four Baldwin brothers:
  - Alec
  - Daniel
  - William
  - Stephen
- Sisters:
  - Elizabeth (née Baldwin) Keuchler
  - Jane (née Baldwin) Sasso
- Present or former wives/partners to the Baldwin brothers:
  - Kim Basinger – ex-wife of Alec
  - Hilaria Baldwin – wife of Alec
  - Isabella Hofmann – former partner of Daniel
  - Chynna Phillips – wife of William
  - Kennya Baldwin – wife of Stephen
- Baldwin brothers' children and their spouses/partners:
  - Kahlea – daughter of Daniel
  - Alaia – daughter of Stephen
    - Andrew Aronow – son-in-law of Stephen
  - Ireland – daughter of Alec
  - Griffin – son of Jane
    - Alexis – daughter-in-law of Jane
  - Granger – son of Jane
  - Alexandra – daughter of Daniel
  - Atticus – son of Daniel
  - William – son of Daniel
  - Hailey – daughter of Stephen
    - Justin Bieber – husband of Hailey
      - Jack Blues Bieber – son of Hailey and Justin
  - Jameson – daughter of William
  - Brooke – daughter of William
  - Vance – son of William

Chynna Phillips’s parents are Michelle Phillips and John Phillips – members of The Mamas and the Papas.

Actors Adam Baldwin, A. Michael Baldwin, Gardner Baldwin, and voice actor Greg Baldwin are not related to the family.

== Family tree ==
John Howland (c. 1599 – February 23, 1673) | Elizabeth Tilley (c. August 1607 – December 21, 1687) | Richard Baldwin (fl. 1500s)
10 generations
Alexander Rae; Baldwin Sr. (25 Mar 1897 – 20 May 1969) | Ruth; Noble (30 Oct 1898 – 30 Oct 1968)
Alexander Rae; Baldwin Jr. (26 Oct 1927 – 15 Apr 1983) | Carol; Martineau (15 Dec 1929 – 26 May 2022)
Elizabeth; Baldwin (b. 15 Oct 1955) | Charles; Keuchler | Cheryl Ann; McGreevy (9 Oct 1964 – 19 Oct 2015) | Daniel Leroy; Baldwin (b. 5 Oct 1960) | Elizabeth; Hitchler (b. 14 Dec 1963) | William Joseph; Baldwin (b. 21 Feb 1963) | Chynna Gilliam; Phillips (b. 12 Feb 1968) | Stephen Andrew; Baldwin (b. 12 May 1966) | Kennya; Deodato (b. 24 Oct 1968)
John; Keuchler | Kahlea; Baldwin (b. 25 Dec 1984) | Alexandra; Baldwin (b. 12 Jan 1994) | Jameson; Baldwin (b. 27 Feb 2000) | Brooke; Baldwin (b. 6 Dec 2004) | Alaia; Baldwin (b. 23 Jan 1993) | Andrew; Aronow (b. 17 Apr 1986)
Jennifer; Keuchler
Jill; Keuchler | Isabella; Hofmann (b. 11 Dec 1958) | Joanne; Clare Smith (b. 18 Dec 1969) | Vance; Baldwin (b. 23 Oct 2001) | Iris Elle; Aronow (b. 17 Aug 2020)
Jean; Keuchler
Jessica; Keuchler | Atticus; Baldwin (b. 13 Jul 1996) | Avis Ann; Baldwin (b. 17 Jan 2008) | Finley Rae; Martineau Baldwin (b. 7 Aug 2009) | Randy; Sasso | Jane Anne; Baldwin (b. 8 Jan 1965) | Justin Drew; Bieber (b. 1 Mar 1994) | Hailey Rhode; Baldwin (b. 22 Nov 1996)
Jacqueline; Keuchler
Griffin; Sasso | Grainger; Sasso | Jack Blues; Bieber (b. 22 Aug 2024)
Kimila Ann; Basinger (b. 8 Dec 1953) | Alexander Rae; Baldwin III (b. 3 Apr 1958) | Hilaria Lynn; Thomas (b. 6 Jan 1984)
André Allen; Anjos (b. 1985) | Ireland Eliesse; Baldwin (b. 23 Oct 1995) | Carmen Gabriela; Baldwin (b. 23 Aug 2013) | Rafael Thomas; Baldwin (b. 17 Jun 2015) | Leonardo Ángel; Charles Baldwin (b. 12 Sep 2016) | Romeo Alejandro; David Baldwin (b. 17 May 2018) | Eduardo Pau; Lucas Baldwin (b. 8 Sep 2020) | Maria Lucia; Victoria Baldwin (b. 25 Feb 2021) | Ilaria Catalina; Irena Baldwin (b. 22 Sep 2022)
Holland; Baldwin (b. 18 May 2023)

== Hollywood ==
Three of the four brothers (Daniel, William, and Stephen) appear in the Oliver Stone film Born on the Fourth of July.

In 1996, E! True Hollywood Story produced a television documentary about the brothers, eponymously titled The Baldwin Brothers.

== In popular culture ==
- In the 1995 film Clueless, "Baldwin" is used as a slang term for an attractive male, coined by writer-director Amy Heckerling after the four brothers.
- In the 1999 film South Park: Bigger, Longer & Uncut, when the United States declares war against Canada, the Royal Canadian airforce are depicted bombing the Baldwins (along with another acting dynasty, the Arquettes) as a pre-emptive strike.

== See also ==
- Baldwin (name)
- List of entertainment industry dynasties
