= 2nd NFL Honors =

2013 American football awards ceremony

- Date: February 2, 2013
- Site: Mahalia Jackson Theater (New Orleans, Louisiana)
- Hosted by: Alec Baldwin

Television coverage
- Network: CBS

The 2nd NFL Honors was an awards show presented by the National Football League to salute the best players and plays from the 2012 NFL season. The event was held at the Mahalia Jackson Theater in New Orleans, Louisiana on February 2, 2013 and was hosted by Alec Baldwin. The show aired on CBS and recorded a 0.9 rating with 3.8 million viewers.

Minnesota Vikings running back Adrian Peterson won four awards, the most of any player. Baldwin's opening monologue, in which he roasted the NFL's biggest stars, was praised. Steve Specht, winner of the Don Shula NFL High School Coach of the Year award, was the coach of Luke Kuechly, another award winner, at Cincinnati's St. Xavier High School.

== List of award winners ==
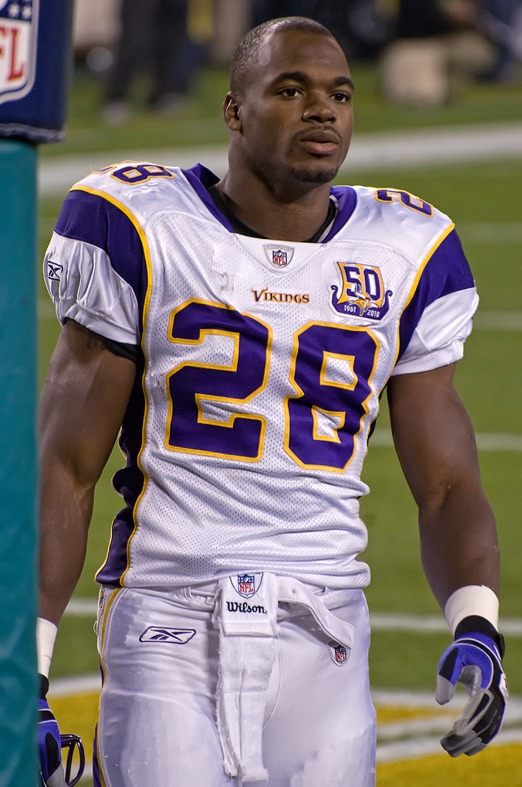
Adrian Peterson, the AP MVP

| Award | Player | Position | Team | Ref |
|---|---|---|---|---|
| AP MVP | Adrian Peterson | Running back | Minnesota Vikings | |
| AP Coach of the Year | Bruce Arians | Interim Head Coach | Indianapolis Colts | |
| AP Offensive Player of the Year | Adrian Peterson | Running back | Minnesota Vikings | |
| AP Defensive Player of the Year | J. J. Watt | Defensive end | Houston Texans | |
| Pepsi NFL Rookie of the Year | Russell Wilson | Quarterback | Seattle Seahawks | |
| AP Offensive Rookie of the Year | Robert Griffin III | Quarterback | Washington Redskins | |
| AP Defensive Rookie of the Year | Luke Kuechly | Linebacker | Carolina Panthers | |
| GMC Never Say Never Moment of the Year | Torrey Smith | Wide receiver | Baltimore Ravens | |
| NFL.com Fantasy Player of the Year | Adrian Peterson | Running back | Minnesota Vikings | |
| Don Shula NFL High School Coach of the Year award | Steve Specht | Head Coach | St. Xavier High School (Cincinnati) | |
| Walter Payton NFL Man of the Year award | Jason Witten | Tight end | Dallas Cowboys | |
| AP Comeback Player of the Year | Peyton Manning | Quarterback | Denver Broncos | |
| FedEx Air Player of the Year | Peyton Manning | Quarterback | Denver Broncos | |
| FedEx Ground Player of the Year | Adrian Peterson | Running back | Minnesota Vikings | |
| Bridgestone Play of the Year | Ray Rice | Running back | Baltimore Ravens | |
| "Greatness on the Road" award | Colin Kaepernick | Quarterback | San Francisco 49ers | |
| Salute to Service award | Charles Tillman | Cornerback | Chicago Bears | |
