= The Baldwins =

American reality television series

- Genre: Reality
- Starring: Alec Baldwin; Hilaria Baldwin
- Country of origin: United States
- Original language: English
- No. of seasons: 1
- No. of episodes: 8

Production
- Executive producers: Tom Forman; Alec Baldwin; Hilaria Baldwin
- Running time: 44 minutes
- Production company: Terminal B Television

Original release
- Network: TLC
- Release: February 23 – April 13, 2025

The Baldwins is an American reality television series starring Alec Baldwin, Hilaria Baldwin, and their seven children, that premiered on February 23, 2025.

== History ==
The series follows the Baldwin family, including Alec, Hilaria, and their seven children. It takes place in the aftermath of the fatal Rust shooting incident, and chronicles the toll it takes on the Baldwin family, as well as the general chaos of raising seven children.

== Cast ==
- Alec Baldwin
- Hilaria Baldwin

The children

- Carmen
- Rafael
- Leonardo
- Romeo
- Eduardo
- María
- Ilaria

== Production ==
The series was developed by Alec, Hilaria, and producers from Terminal B, a production company. In the spring of 2024, TLC won a competitive bidding war for the program. The series was publicly announced on June 4, 2024.

== Episodes ==
No.	Title	Original release date
1	"Along Came Hilaria"	February 23, 2025
Actor Alec Baldwin and wife Hilaria celebrate oldest son Rafael's birthday. They pack up their seven kids and pets and leave for East Hampton for the summer, but with Alec's trial coming up, they face difficult decisions as a family.
2	"It's Really Complicated"	March 2, 2025
Alec and Hilaria do their best to put on a brave face for their kids with Alec's trial just a week away. Hilaria prepares an unusual gift for Alec for their Wedding Anniversary, as the couple faces a tough choice and an unknown future.
3	"Coming Home"	March 9, 2025
Alec and Hilaria Baldwin return home after the trial to their kids and try to discover a new normal. Alec agrees to go to therapy to process what has happened.
4	"Always Be Cleaning"	March 16, 2025
Alec and Hilaria try to move forward and focus on the kids; they attend a therapy session to try to heal, but have different opinions about the next steps in their life.
5	"Glengarry Glen Floss"	March 23, 2025
Hilaria plans a trip to the city to take all seven kids to the dentist; actress Caroline Rhea visits and talks Hollywood with Alec; Ireland Baldwin comes to town with her baby daughter Holland.
6	"Mission: Impossible Rug Nation"	March 30, 2025
Alec and Hilaria attempt to potty-train their dogs, who have ruined their rugs. After years of fight or flight, it's time for some fun as the couple takes up salsa dancing.
7	"Working Guy"	April 5, 2025
The family soaks up the last days of summer before heading back to the city. Alec faces a tough decision: return to acting or continue as a stay-at-home dad? Hilaria addresses changes in her postpartum body.
8	"You're My 30 Rock"	April 13, 2025
The family celebrates Carmen's birthday, and Alec gets an offer for a movie that could take him away from the family. When they head back to Manhattan, they face new opportunities and a new reality as they get 6 kids off to school.

== Reception ==
=== Critical response ===
The series received negative reviews from critics, in particular its handling of the Rust shooting, with many criticizing it as inauthentic. The series has an approval rating of 20% on Rotten Tomatoes. On Metacritic, the series has a weighted average score of 37 out of 100 based on 13 critics, indicating "generally unfavorable" reviews.

Variety labeled it "strange" and described the series as "being trapped on a vacation with someone else's family and watching with creeping horror as they get on each other's nerves". Lucy Mangan of the Guardian derided the series as "dreadful" and "in extremely poor taste".

=== Ratings ===
The premiere drew 680,000 viewers. The series struggled with poor ratings, finishing its run as the third most popular show on TLC, averaging 513,000 viewers.
