= Up Late with Alec Baldwin =

2013 American late-night talk show

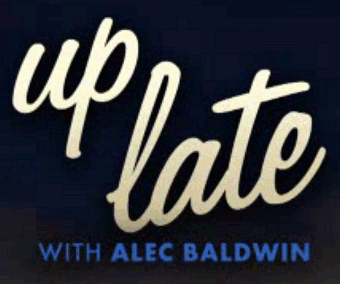
- Title card
- Genre: Political discussion / opinion
- Presented by: Alec Baldwin
- Country of origin: United States
- Original language: English
- No. of seasons: 1
- No. of episodes: 5

Production
- Executive producer: Jonathan Larsen
- Production locations: 30 Rockefeller Plaza, New York City
- Camera setup: Multi-camera
- Running time: 60 minutes

Original release
- Network: MSNBC
- Release: October 11 – November 8, 2013

Related
- Lockup

Up Late with Alec Baldwin is a late-night talk show that aired briefly on MSNBC hosted by Alec Baldwin. The series lasted five episodes airing Fridays at 10 p.m. from October 11 to November 8, 2013, in a time-slot previously held by Lockup.

== Description ==
Baldwin discussed current events and past experiences with various guests from news programs, politics, and the arts. The show used a multi-camera set-up. The set was fashioned after a New York City diner, and Baldwin conversed with his guests over coffee while sitting in a corner booth.

The show began its run while the host was in the midst of a two-year contract with MSNBC's production arm, Universal Television. In an interview with The Daily Beast, Baldwin stated, "I'm going to do it for a year, and then we'll see what happens."

On November 15, 2013, MSNBC announced that Up Late would be suspended for two weeks starting with that night's show after Baldwin received criticism for allegedly calling a photographer a "cock-sucking fag". Baldwin denied the specific wording of the insult, though he still released an apology for the outburst. On November 26, 2013, MSNBC announced that they had fired Baldwin and cancelled the program.

== Episodes ==
No.	Guest	Original release date	U.S. viewers (millions)
1	Bill de Blasio	October 11, 2013	0.654
The New York City mayoral candidate discusses various issues and life experiences.
2	Debra Winger	October 18, 2013	0.529
The actress reflects on her career.
3	Chris Matthews	October 25, 2013	0.553
The host of Hardball with Chris Matthews on MSNBC discusses his new book, Tip and the Gipper, and the current state of politics in the United States. Also: New York Times columnist Michael Powell.
4	Gary Lockwood and Keir Dullea	November 1, 2013	0.354
The actors discuss their movie 2001: A Space Odyssey.
5	Cristina Tzintzún and Mary Brosnahan	November 8, 2013	0.395
