= Built Ford Tough Offensive Line of the Year =

- Awarded for: Awarded annually to the best offensive line.
- Country: United States
- Presented by: National Football League
- First award: 2016
- Final award: 2018

The Built Ford Tough Offensive Line of the Year was an award given annually in honor of the National Football League (NFL)'s best offensive line. The award was established after the 2016 season, and first awarded to the Dallas Cowboys at the 6th NFL Honors. The award has not been given since the 2018 season.

== Background ==
In 2009, the NFL announced they would be honoring the league's best offensive line with the Madden Most Valuable Protectors Award. The award was named after John Madden and sponsored by Prilosec OTC. The award was discontinued after the 2012 season.

In 2016, the Ford F-Series was named the NFL's official truck sponsor. After that, the NFL and Ford partnered together to begin awarding Offensive Line of the Week recognitions, with NFL Network analyst and former Pro Bowl center Shaun O'Hara selecting those lines. At the 6th NFL Honors, following the 2016 season, the Dallas Cowboys' offensive line was selected as the Offensive Line of the Year.

== List ==
Season	Team	Left tackle	Left guard	Center	Right guard	Right tackle	Ref.
2016	Dallas	Tyron Smith	Ronald Leary	Travis Frederick	Zack Martin	Doug Free	
2017	Philadelphia	Halapoulivaati Vaitai	Stefen Wisniewski	Jason Kelce	Brandon Brooks	Lane Johnson	
2018	LA Rams	Andrew Whitworth	Rodger Saffold	John Sullivan	Austin Blythe	Rob Havenstein	

== See also ==
- Madden Most Valuable Protectors award
- NFL Protector of the Year
