= Seattle Cover 3 defense =

American football defensive formation

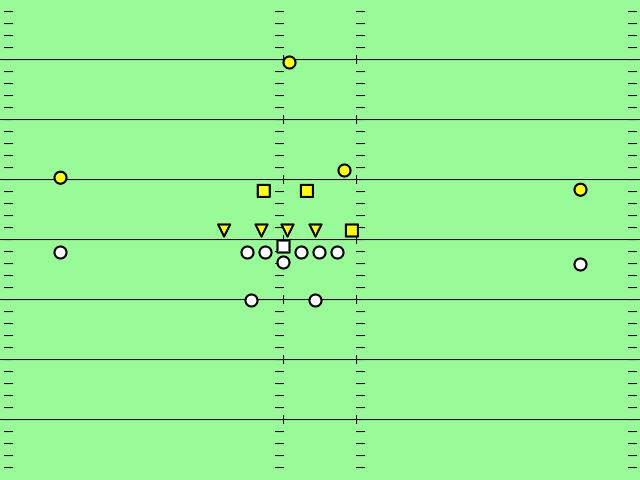
The defensive using a 4-3 under reduced front. Yellow triangles are linemen, yellow squares are linebackers, yellow circles are defensive backs. The two linemen to the left of the offensive center use a 1 gap technique, while the two to the right of the offensive center use a 2 gap technique. Left to right the linemen's roles are the Leo, the 3 tech, the nose tackle, and the big end.

The Seattle Cover 3 is a Cover 3 defense crafted by Seattle Seahawks coaches Pete Carroll and Dan Quinn that led the NFL in total defense in 2013 and 2014 and scoring defense for four straight years from 2012 to 2015, helping the team win two NFC Championships and Super Bowl XLVIII. The defense used a 4-3 base formation while incorporating 3–4 defensive principles using a hybrid defensive end-linebacker position known as the Leo. It featured a strong secondary nicknamed the Legion of Boom.

== In depth ==
"Our end and nose and tackle are our three big guys. So we are half 4–3, half 3–4. They have to be big enough and stout enough to play the run, and then when we go into nickel is when we move a guy like (Michael) Bennett to defensive tackle or Bruce (Irvin) to a defensive end spot."

— Defensive coordinator Dan Quinn

The Seattle 4–3 hybrid defense is based on the 4–3 under front used by Monte Kiffin. (Note: Kiffin's 4–3 under is perhaps best known to the public as the defensive front used by Tony Dungy's Tampa 2 defense.) Unlike the standard 4–3 under, in which all the defensive linemen employ one gap techniques, the Seattle variant has a split personality. In its best known form, half the line uses 3-4 two gap principles, while the other half acts like a one gap 4–3.

Also unlike many defenses, where a defender on the right side is always on the right, the Seattle 4–3 shifts specific players to the strong side of the formation, as determined by the position of the tight end. The strong side defensive end is also called the "big end". Other positions include the nose tackle, the 3-technique tackle, and the Leo, a hybrid defensive end and outside linebacker. The big end and the nose tackle use a 2 gap technique, while the 3-technique and the Leo use a one-gap technique.

This defensive front is usually coupled with a Cover 3 defensive backfield where a safety comes down to about linebacker depth. This puts eight men close to the line of scrimmage. The combination of two 2 gap defensive linemen and "8 in the box" means the formation is powerful against the run. The Cover 3 as employed by Seattle 4–3 users also emphasizes the size of their defensive backs. To further defend against the run, the 4–3 under front can be reduced. In a reduced front, the big end moves from the outside shoulder of the strong side tackle to the inside shoulder. It subsequently becomes much harder for an offense to run into the strong side B gap.

== History ==
In 2010, in order to get a bigger front in order to defend the run, Pete Carroll introduced two gap techniques into his 4–3 under. This was also about the time Dan Quinn convinced Red Bryant to play the big end position, to make use of his ability to two gap The resulting hybrid front became successful. In part, it was successful by finding functional use of players like Kam Chancellor, who would have been regarded as a positionless "tweener" by more traditional NFL defenses. By 2013, this scheme helped lead the Seattle Seahawks to two Super Bowls, and was so effective the defensive secondary acquired its own nickname, the Legion of Boom.

The defense was later used by Gus Bradley and Robert Saleh.
