= Bruce Irvin =

American football player (born 1987)

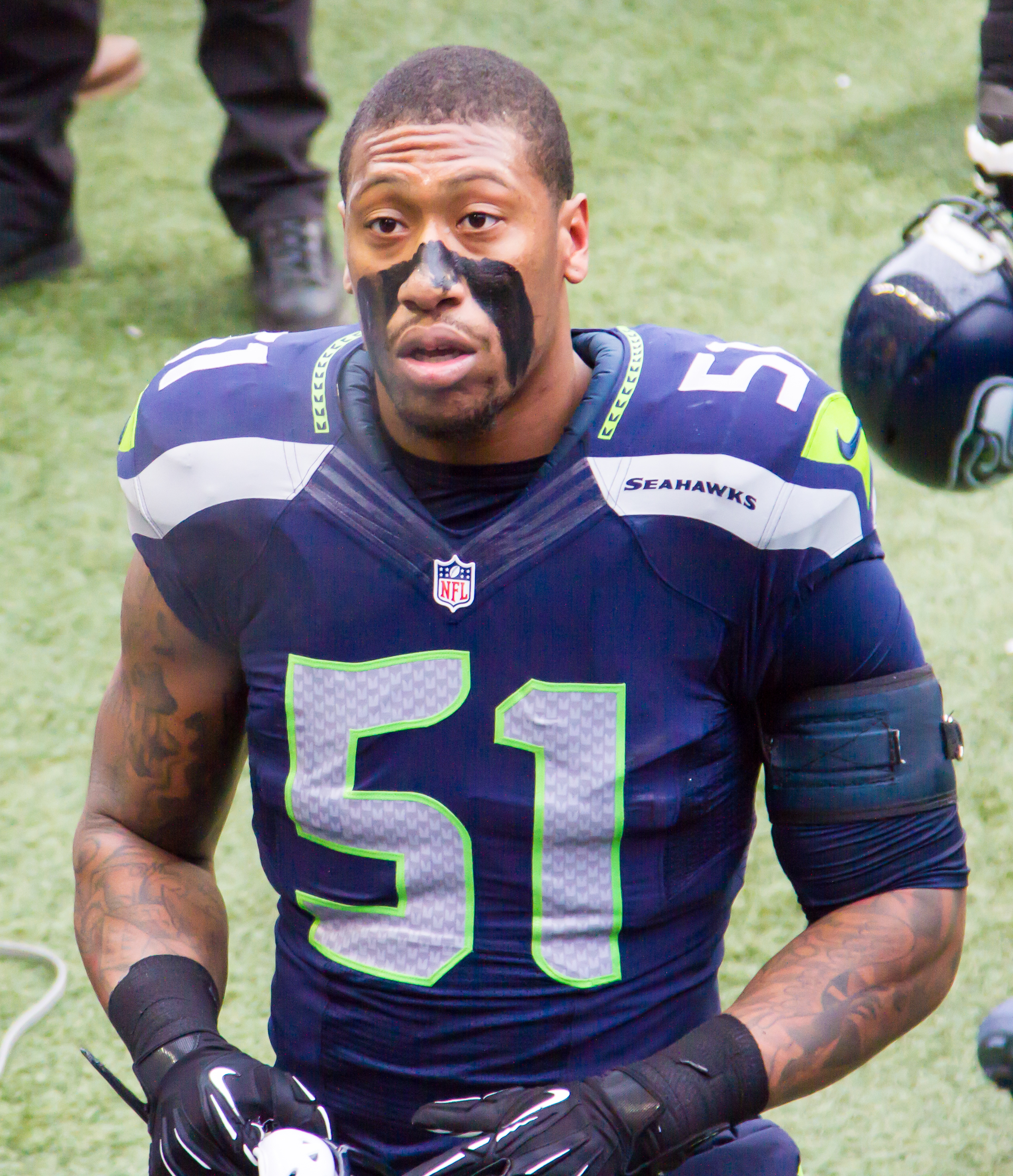
- Irvin with the Seattle Seahawks in 2014

No. 51, 52, 55, 46
- Position: Linebacker

Personal information
- Born: November 1, 1987 (age 39); Atlanta, Georgia, U.S.
- Listed height: 6 ft 3 in (1.91 m)
- Listed weight: 250 lb (113 kg)

Career information
- High school: Stephenson (Stone Mountain, Georgia)
- College: Mt. San Antonio (2008–2009); West Virginia (2010–2011)
- NFL draft: 2012: 1st round, 15th overall pick

Career history
- Seattle Seahawks (2012–2015); Oakland Raiders (2016–2018); Atlanta Falcons (2018); Carolina Panthers (2019); Seattle Seahawks (2020); Chicago Bears (2021); Seattle Seahawks (2022); Detroit Lions (2023); Miami Dolphins (2023)

Awards and highlights
- Super Bowl champion (XLVIII); NFL forced fumbles co-leader (2016); PFWA All-Rookie Team (2012); First-team All-Big East (2011); Second-team All-Big East (2010)

Career NFL statistics
- Total tackles: 344
- Sacks: 56.5
- Forced fumbles: 16
- Fumble recoveries: 3
- Interceptions: 3
- Pass deflections: 13
- Defensive touchdowns: 2
- Stats at Pro Football Reference

Bruce Pernell Irvin Jr. (born November 1, 1987) is an American former professional football player who was a linebacker in the National Football League (NFL). He played college football for the West Virginia Mountaineers and was selected by the Seattle Seahawks in the first round with the 15th overall pick of the 2012 NFL draft. Irvin won Super Bowl XLVIII over the Denver Broncos, and also played in Super Bowl XLIX where he became the first player ever to be ejected from a Super Bowl.

== Early life ==
Irvin attended Stockbridge High School in Stockbridge, Georgia, until transferring to Stephenson High School in Stone Mountain, Georgia right before his junior year. He dropped out of high school during the middle of his junior year and instead attained his GED.

== College career ==
Irvin attended Butler Community College before transferring to Mt. San Antonio College. While at Mt. San Antonio, Irvin had 72 tackles, 16 sacks, three forced fumbles and a touchdown on a fumble recovery. He was named a JC Athletic Bureau first team All-American and was the all-California Region III player of the year.

Irvin transferred to West Virginia University (WVU) in 2010. He finished the season second in the nation in sacks with 14. He was a second team all-Big East selection and an honorable mention All-American by SI.com. Irvin returned to WVU after turning professional, earning his bachelor's degree in 2018.

== Professional career ==
=== Pre-draft ===
Irvin was one of 58 collegiate defensive linemen to attend the NFL Scouting Combine in Indianapolis, Indiana. He attended as a defensive end and completed all of the required combine drills. His time of 4.50s in the 40-yard dash was the fastest among all defensive linemen. Irvin opted to have another attempt at the 40-yard dash and surprised many scouts and analysts by running a 4.43s. On March 14, 2012, Irvin was arrested for destruction of property after allegedly tearing a magnetic sign off of a Jimmy John's delivery vehicle in Morgantown, West Virginia. On March 16, 2012, he attended West Virginia's pro day, but opted to stand on his combine numbers and only perform positional drills. During the draft process, he attended private workouts and meetings with multiple teams, including the New York Jets, New England Patriots, Buffalo Bills, Miami Dolphins, San Francisco 49ers, and Cleveland Browns. On April 24, 2012, the charges of destruction of property against Irvin were dropped. At the conclusion of the pre-draft process, Irvin was projected to be a second or third round pick by NFL draft experts and scouts. While he showed superior speed and athleticism, many analysts and draft experts had him a second round draft prospect due to his numerous off the field issues he had throughout his youth and time at West Virginia. He was ranked the fifth best outside linebacker in the draft by NFLDraftScout.com.

Pre-draft measurables
Height	Weight	Arm length	Hand span	Wingspan	40-yard dash	10-yard split	20-yard split	20-yard shuttle	Three-cone drill	Vertical jump	Broad jump	Bench press
6 ft 3 in (1.91 m)	245 lb (111 kg)	33 3/8 in (0.85 m)	9 5/8 in (0.24 m)	6 ft 6 1/2 in (1.99 m)	4.50 s	1.58 s	2.66 s	4.03 s	6.70 s	33.5 in (0.85 m)	10 ft 3 in (3.12 m)	23 reps
All values from NFL Combine

=== Seattle Seahawks (first stint) ===
==== 2012 ====
The Seattle Seahawks selected Irvin in the first round (15th overall) of the 2012 NFL draft. He was the highest selected West Virginia Mountaineer since Adam Jones in 2005. Irvin was also the first defensive end and fourth defensive lineman selected in 2012.

The Seahawks selection of Irvin surprised many scouts and analysts and drew major criticism as no major mock drafts, including Sports Illustrated, ESPN, Mike Mayock, and Mel Kiper, had Irvin being selected in the first round. It was reported that Irvin had quietly become a top prospect and at least seven teams had him ranked as a top 15 talent. On May 7, 2012, the Seahawks signed Irvin to a fully guaranteed four-year, $9.34 million contract that includes a signing bonus of $4.92 million.

Irvin entered training camp getting first team reps at the Seahawks' hybrid Leo (defensive end/outside linebacker) position while Chris Clemons was in a contract hold out. Once Clemons returned in July, Irvin reverted to the second team defense. Head coach Pete Carroll named him the backup defensive end behind Clemons to start the regular season, with Red Bryant occupying the other side.

He made his professional regular season debut in the Seahawks' season-opening 20–16 loss at the Arizona Cardinals. On September 16, 2012, Irvin made his first career tackles and was credited with a half a sack during the Seahawks' 27–7 victory against the Dallas Cowboys. In the fourth quarter, Irvin and Jason Jones sacked quarterback Tony Romo together, marking the first sack of his career. On September 24, 2012, Irvin recorded two combined tackles and sacked Aaron Rodgers twice during a 14–12 victory over the Green Bay Packers. This marked his first career multi-sack game, solo tackle, and solo sack. In Week 5, Irvin recorded two solo tackles, had two sacks, and forced the first fumble of his career during a 16–12 win at the Carolina Panthers. On November 11, 2012, Irvin made two solo tackles and sacked Jets quarterback Mark Sanchez twice in Seattle's 28–7 victory. He finished his rookie season with ten combined tackles (eight solo), eight sacks, and a forced fumble in 16 games and zero starts. He was named to the PFWA All-Rookie Team.

Irvin played his first career playoff game in the Wild Card game against the Washington Redskins, where he sacked Washington QB Robert Griffin III for a 12-yard loss late in the fourth quarter and also recorded a defended pass en route to the team's 24–14 victory. He went on to start a playoff game for the first time in his career in the divisional round game against the Atlanta Falcons, which the Seahawks lost 28–30.

==== 2013 ====
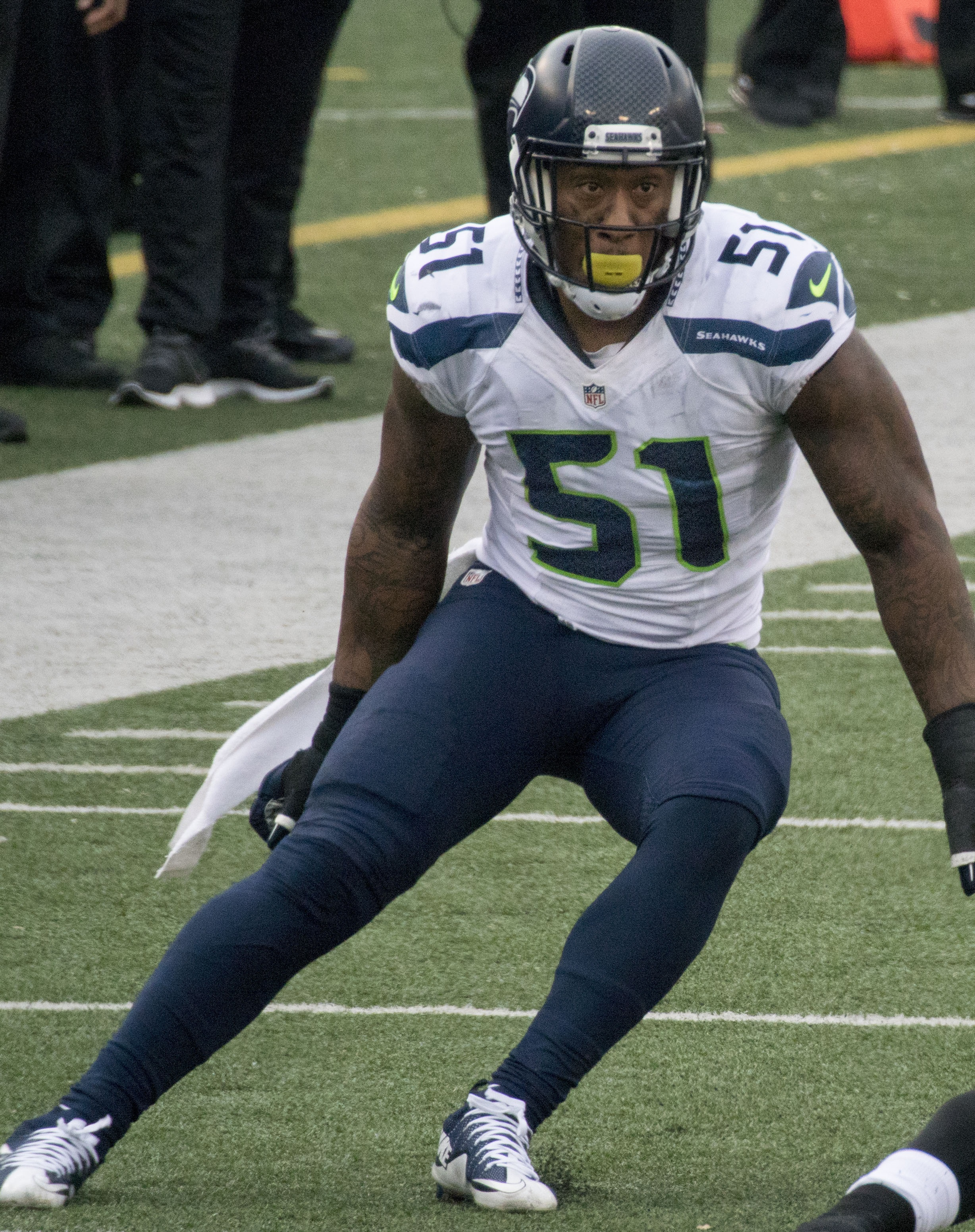
Irvin in 2015

On May 17, 2013, Irvin was suspended for the first four games of the 2013 NFL season for violating the NFL's substance abuse policy.

During the offseason, the Seahawks signed free agent defensive ends Michael Bennett and Cliff Avril. Head coach Pete Carroll stated that the Seahawks intended to move Irvin to outside linebacker for the 2013 season. He was slated to be the Seahawks' strongside linebacker and defensive end in Seattle's Wide 9 nickel scheme under new defensive coordinator Dan Quinn.

He returned in Week 5 and made his first career start in the Seahawks' 34–28 loss at the Indianapolis Colts. He finished with four combined tackles and his first sack of the season, taking down Andrew Luck. On October 28, 2013, Irvin recorded a season-high nine combined tackles, a sack, a forced fumble, and made the first interception of his career during a 14–9 victory at the St. Louis Rams. He finished the 2013 season with 43 combined tackles (31 solo), two sacks, two pass deflections, and an interception in 12 games and 12 starts.

The Seahawks finished atop The NFC West with a 13–3 record and also received a first-round bye, as well as home field advantage. On January 11, 2014, he recorded two combined tackles during a 23–15 victory over the New Orleans Saints in the National Football Conference (NFC) Divisional round. The next week, the Seahawks defeated the 49ers in the NFC Championship. On February 2, 2014, Irvin played in Super Bowl XLVIII and made two solo tackles as the Seahawks routed the Denver Broncos 43–8.

==== 2014 ====
Irvin returned as the strongside linebacker in 2014 with Bobby Wagner at middle linebacker and K. J. Wright at weakside linebacker. Irvin missed the Seahawks' Week 3 victory over the Broncos because of a rib injury. On October 26, 2014, Irvin recorded three combined tackles and made two consecutive sacks in the fourth quarter to help preserve a 13–9 victory over the Panthers. The following week, he made three combined tackles, deflected a pass, and returned an interception for a 35-yard touchdown during a 30–24 victory against the Oakland Raiders. On December 28, 2014, Irvin recorded five combined tackles, a pass deflection, a sack, and returned an interception off a pass attempt by Sam Bradford for a 49-yard touchdown in the Seahawks' 20–6 victory over the Rams. He finished the 2014 season with 37 combined tackles (24 solo), 6.5 sacks, three pass deflections, two interceptions, and two touchdowns in 15 games and 13 starts. The Seahawks allowed the fewest points during the season and began to distinguish itself as one of the top defenses of all time.

The Seahawks finished first in the NFC West with a 12–4 record and received a first-round bye. They reached the Super Bowl for the second season in a row after defeating the Panthers in the divisional round and the Packers in the NFC Championship. On February 2, 2015, Irvin started his second consecutive Super Bowl and recorded two solo tackles and a sack on Tom Brady during the Seahawks' 28–24 loss to the Patriots in Super Bowl XLIX. In the final 20 seconds of Super Bowl XLIX, Irvin was ejected from the game after committing an unnecessary roughness penalty by throwing a closed-hand punch at Patriots tight end Rob Gronkowski that incited a brawl on the penultimate play. He was the first player in NFL history to ever be ejected from a Super Bowl and was fined $10,000 by the NFL. At the time of the penalty, the Patriots had the game in hand after a fourth-quarter comeback victory over the Seahawks.

==== 2015 ====
On May 2, 2015, it was reported that the Seahawks opted to decline the fifth-year, $7.75 million option on Irvin's rookie contract.

Defensive coordinator Dan Quinn departed after receiving the head coaching role for the Falcons and was replaced by Kris Richard. Richard opted to retain Wagner, Wright, and Irvin as the starting linebacker trio heading into the regular season. On October 18, 2015, Irvin recorded five combined tackles and sacked Panthers quarterback Cam Newton twice during a 27–23 loss. He was inactive for the Seahawks' Week 11 win against the 49ers after suffering an MCL sprain. Irvin finished the 2015 season with 38 combined tackles (22 solo), 5.5 sacks, and two pass deflections in 15 games and 12 starts. All three of Seattle's linebackers were ranked in the top 30 by Pro Football Focus in 2015. Weakside linebacker K. J. Wright ranked sixth among all linebackers, Irvin played strongside linebacker and ranked 15th, and Bobby Wagner ranked 30th in overall grades at middle linebacker.

The Seahawks finished second in their division with a 10–6 record and went on to make it to the NFC divisional round before being defeated by the Carolina Panthers 31–24.

=== Oakland Raiders ===
==== 2016 ====
On March 10, 2016, the Raiders signed Irvin to a four-year, $37 million contract that includes $19 million guaranteed. This reunited him with Ken Norton Jr., who had accepted the Raiders' job as defensive coordinator after being the Seahawks linebackers' coach from 2010 to 2014.

Head coach Jack Del Rio named Irvin the starting strongside linebacker to begin the regular season, with Ben Heeney starting at middle linebacker, and former Seahawks' teammate Malcolm Smith at weakside linebacker.

He started the Raiders' season-opener at the Saints and recorded two combined tackles and a sack on Drew Brees in the Raiders' 35–34 victory. On November 21, 2016, Irvin recorded a season-high ten combined tackles and sacked Brock Osweiler during a 27–20 victory over the Houston Texans in Mexico City, Mexico. In Week 15, he collected six combined tackles and two sacks on Philip Rivers during a 19–16 win over the San Diego Chargers. He was named American Football Conference (AFC) Defensive Player of the Week for his Week 15 performance. He finished the 2016 season with 57 combined tackles (47 solo), seven sacks, and a pass deflection in 16 games and 16 starts.

The Raiders finished second in the AFC West with a 12–4 record and received a playoff berth. On January 7, 2017, Irvin started his first career playoff game as a member of the Raiders and recorded five combined tackles in a 27–14 loss to the Houston Texans.

==== 2017 ====
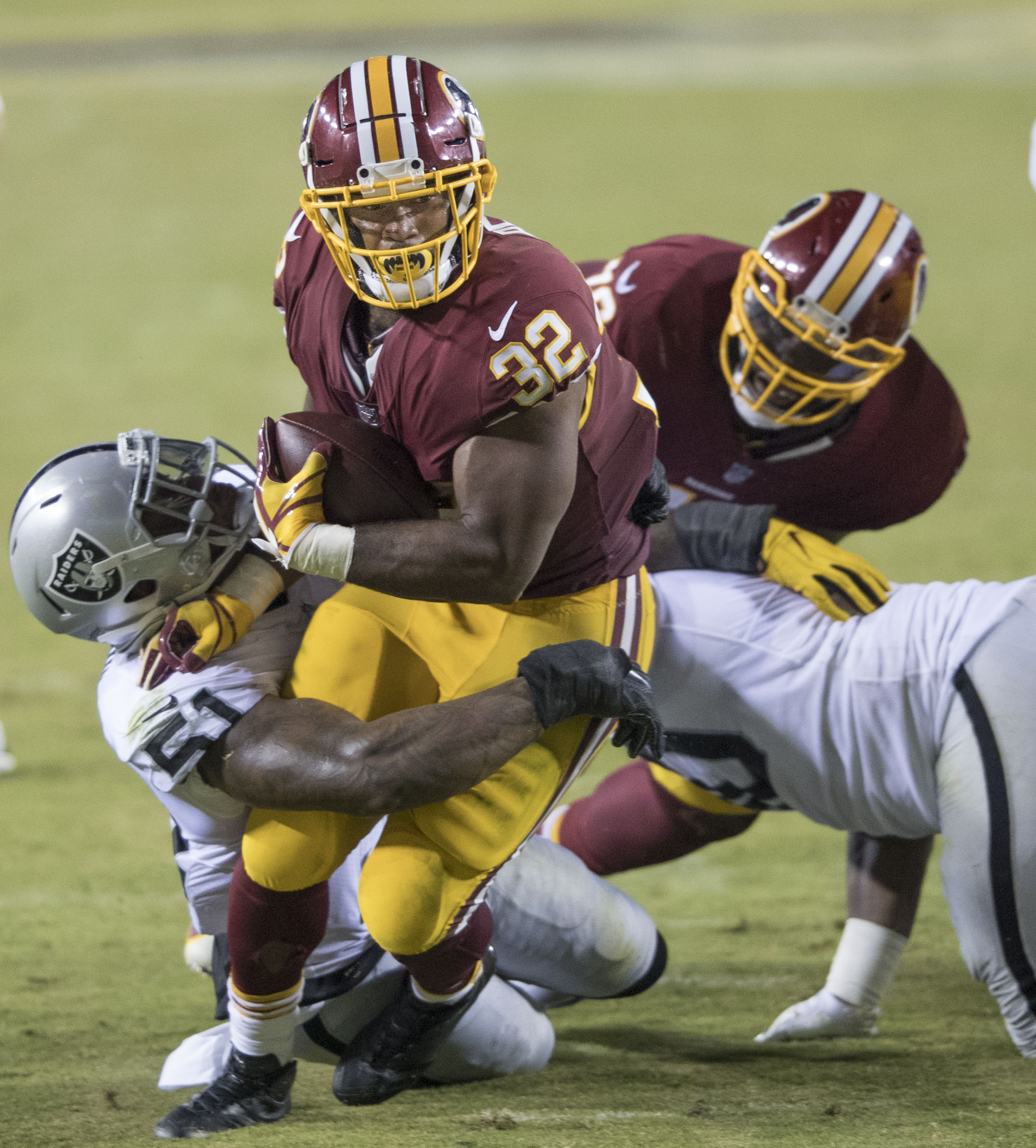
Irvin tackles Samaje Perine in a game against the Washington Redskins

On November 26, 2017, Irvin recorded three solo tackles and two sacks during a 21–14 victory against the Broncos. The next week, he made a season-high eight combined tackles and a sack on Geno Smith in the Raiders' 24–17 win against the New York Giants. In Week 14, Irvin recorded four solo tackles and two sacks on Alex Smith in a 26–15 loss at the Kansas City Chiefs. Irvin finished the 2017 season with a career-high 58 combined tackles (38 solo), a career-high eight sacks, and three pass deflections in 16 games and 16 starts. He was ranked 85th by his peers on the NFL Top 100 Players of 2018.

==== 2018 ====
On September 11, 2018, Irvin recorded a strip-sack in the season-opener against the Los Angeles Rams. On September 30, he would record his second sack against the Browns and would get his third the next week against the Los Angeles Chargers, his 40th career sack. On November 3, 2018, Irvin was released by the Raiders after eight games.

=== Atlanta Falcons ===
On November 7, 2018, Irvin signed a one-year contract with his hometown team, the Falcons. Irvin recorded 3.5 sacks and 13 combined tackles in his 8 games with the Falcons.

=== Carolina Panthers ===
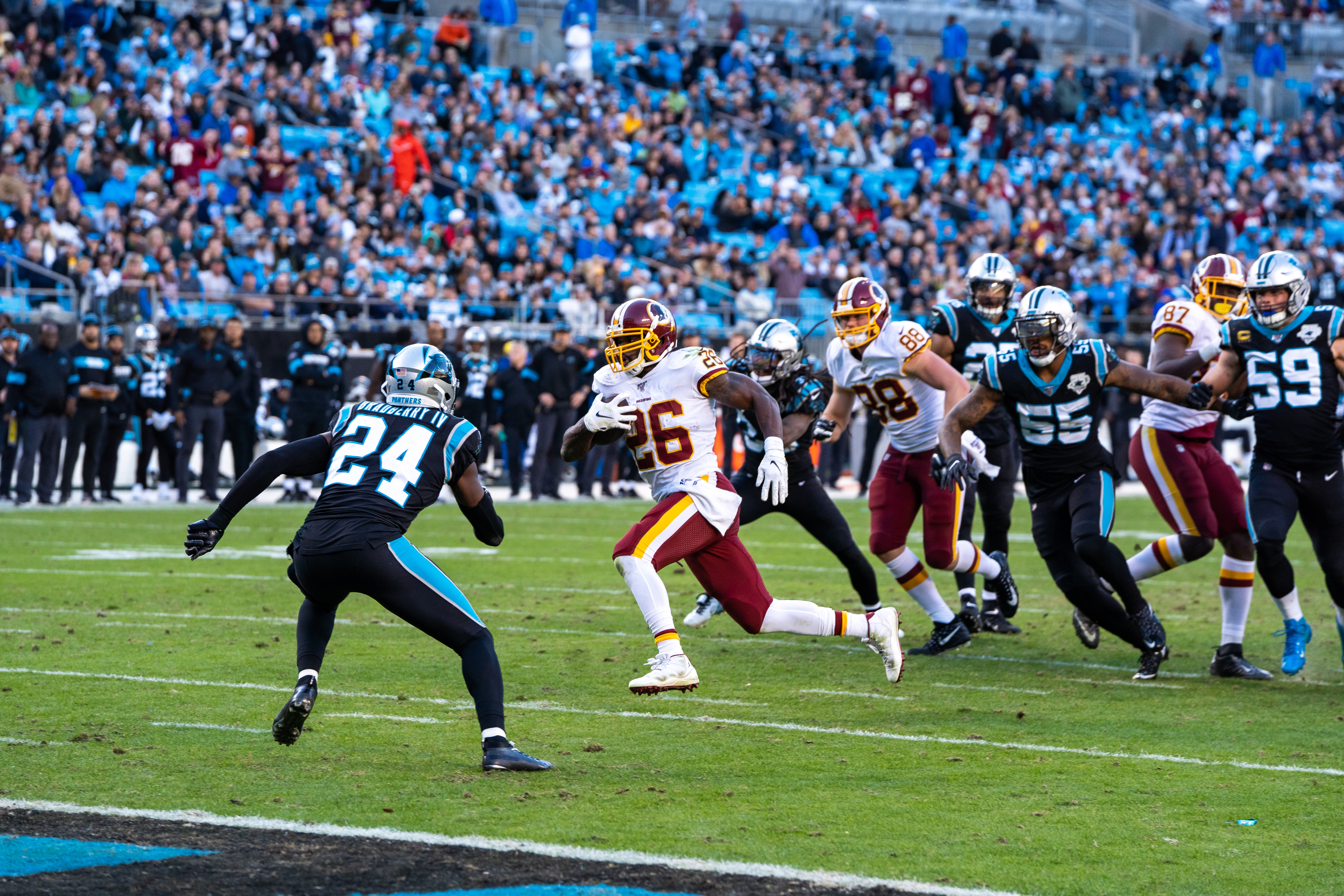
Irvin (55) in a game against the Redskins

On March 19, 2019, Irvin signed a one-year contract with the Panthers. In Week 16 against the Indianapolis Colts, Irvin sacked Jacoby Brissett twice during the 38–6 loss.

=== Seattle Seahawks (second stint) ===
Irvin re-signed with the Seahawks on April 23, 2020. He suffered a torn ACL in week 2 and was placed on injured reserve on September 23.

=== Chicago Bears ===
On November 18, 2021, Irvin was signed to the practice squad of the Chicago Bears. He was promoted to the active roster on December 10. On December 26, Irvin's pressure on Russell Wilson leading to an incompletion on fourth down secured a 25–24 victory by the Bears versus Irvin's former team, the Seahawks.

=== Seattle Seahawks (third stint) ===
Irvin re-signed with the Seahawks onto their practice squad on October 12, 2022. He subsequently played with the team, beginning with the Los Angeles Chargers game in week 7. He was signed to the active roster on November 4, 2022.

=== Detroit Lions ===
On November 14, 2023, Irvin was signed to the Detroit Lions practice squad. On January 3, 2024, Irvin was released by the Lions.

=== Miami Dolphins ===
On January 9, 2024, Irvin signed with the Miami Dolphins.

== NFL career statistics ==
Legend
	Won the Super Bowl
	Led the league
**Bold**	Career high

=== Regular season ===
Year	Team	Games		Tackles					Interceptions					Fumbles			
Year	Team	GP	GS	Cmb	Solo	Ast	Sck	TFL	Int	Yds	TD	Lng	PD	FF	FR	Yds	TD
2012	SEA	**16**	0	17	10	7	8.0	6	0	0	0	0	0	1	**1**	**35**	0
2013	SEA	12	12	40	31	9	2.0	2	1	8	0	8	2	1	0	0	0
2014	SEA	15	13	38	24	14	6.5	9	**2**	**84**	**2**	**49**	**3**	1	0	0	0
2015	SEA	15	12	38	22	16	5.5	8	0	0	0	0	2	1	**1**	1	0
2016	OAK	**16**	**16**	57	**47**	10	7.0	9	0	0	0	0	1	**6**	0	0	0
2017	OAK	**16**	**16**	**58**	38	**20**	8.0	**14**	0	0	0	0	**3**	4	0	0	0
2018	OAK	8	6	6	6	0	3.0	3	0	0	0	0	0	1	0	0	0
2018	ATL	8	3	13	10	3	3.5	4	0	0	0	0	0	0	0	0	0
2019	CAR	13	12	36	22	14	**8.5**	8	0	0	0	0	1	1	**1**	0	0
2020	SEA	2	2	5	4	1	0.0	1	0	0	0	0	0	0	0	0	0
2021	CHI	6	1	7	2	5	0.0	0	0	0	0	0	1	0	0	0	0
2022	SEA	11	10	28	18	10	3.5	5	0	0	0	0	0	0	0	0	0
2023	DET	2	0	1	1	0	1.0	1	0	0	0	0	0	0	0	0	0
Career		140	103	344	235	109	56.5	70	3	92	2	49	13	16	3	36	0

=== Playoffs ===
Year	Team	Games		Tackles					Interceptions					Fumbles			
Year	Team	GP	GS	Cmb	Solo	Ast	Sck	TFL	Int	Yds	TD	Lng	PD	FF	FR	Yds	TD
2012	SEA	2	1	2	2	0	1.0	1	0	0	0	0	**1**	0	0	0	0
2013	SEA	**3**	2	5	**5**	0	0.0	0	0	0	0	0	0	0	0	0	0
2014	SEA	**3**	**3**	**6**	4	**2**	**2.0**	**2**	0	0	0	0	0	0	0	0	0
2015	SEA	2	2	5	3	**2**	0.5	0	0	0	0	0	0	0	0	0	0
2016	OAK	1	1	5	3	**2**	0.0	0	0	0	0	0	0	0	0	0	0
2022	SEA	1	1	5	4	1	1.0	**2**	0	0	0	0	0	0	0	0	0
2023	MIA	1	0	0	0	0	0.0	0	0	0	0	0	0	0	0	0	0
Career		13	10	28	21	7	4.5	5	0	0	0	0	1	0	0	0	0
