= Dan Quinn (American football) =

American football coach (born 1970)

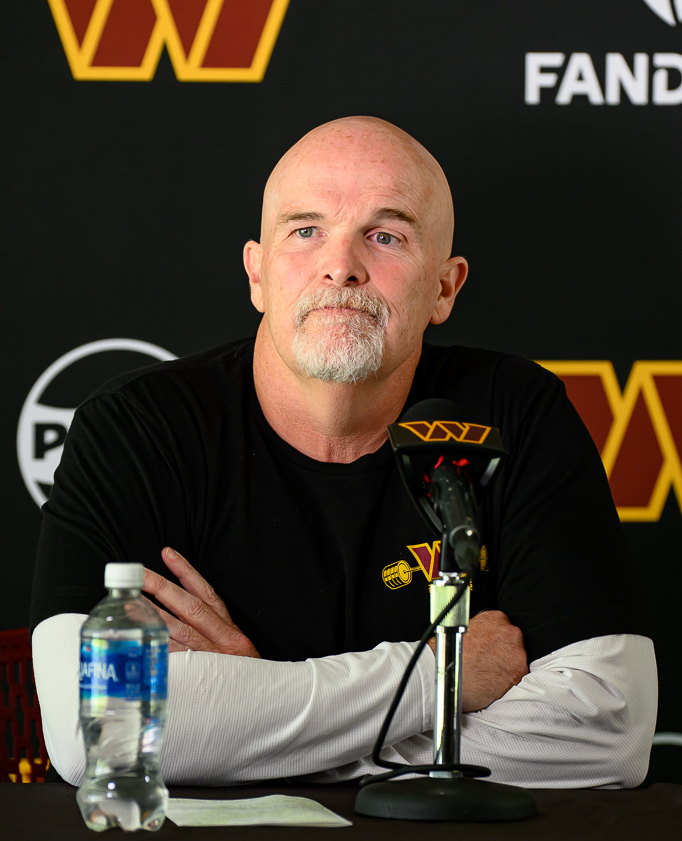
- Quinn with the Washington Commanders in 2025

Washington Commanders
- Title: Head coach

Personal information
- Born: September 11, 1970 (age 56); Morristown, New Jersey, U.S.

Career information
- Position: Defensive lineman (No. 99)
- High school: Morristown
- College: Salisbury (1989–1993)

Career history
- William & Mary (1994) Defensive line coach; VMI (1995) Defensive line coach; Hofstra (1996–2000); Defensive line coach (1996–1999); Defensive coordinator & defensive line coach (2000); San Francisco 49ers (2001–2004); Defensive quality control coach (2001–2002); Defensive line coach (2003–2004); Miami Dolphins (2005–2006) Defensive line coach; New York Jets (2007–2008) Defensive line coach; Seattle Seahawks (2009–2010) Assistant head coach & defensive line coach; Florida (2011–2012) Defensive coordinator & defensive line coach; Seattle Seahawks (2013–2014) Defensive coordinator; Atlanta Falcons (2015–2020) Head coach; Dallas Cowboys (2021–2023) Defensive coordinator; Washington Commanders (2024–present) Head coach

Awards and highlights
- Super Bowl champion (XLVIII); Assistant Coach of the Year (2021); NFL Salute to Service (2016); Salisbury Athletics Hall of Fame (2005)

Head coaching record
- Regular season: 63–64–1 (.496)
- Postseason: 5–3 (.625)
- Career: 68–67–1 (.504)
- Coaching profile at Pro Football Reference

Daniel Patrick Quinn (born September 11, 1970) is an American professional football coach who is the head coach for the Washington Commanders of the National Football League (NFL). He came to prominence as the defensive coordinator of the Seattle Seahawks from 2013 to 2014, coaching a defense later known as the Seattle Cover 3 that featured the Legion of Boom secondary. In both years under Quinn, Seattle's defense led the NFL in total defense and made consecutive Super Bowl appearances, winning the franchise's first in Super Bowl XLVIII.

Quinn then served six seasons as the head coach of the Atlanta Falcons from 2015 to 2020, with the team appearing in Super Bowl LI at the end of the 2016 season. Quinn would make the playoffs only once more in Atlanta, resulting in his firing early in the 2020 season. Quinn was hired as defensive coordinator of the Dallas Cowboys in 2021, with his unit leading the league in takeaways for three consecutive seasons. Quinn was named head coach of the Commanders in 2024, leading them to an appearance in the NFC Championship Game in his first year.

== Early life ==
Quinn was born on September 11, 1970, in Morristown, New Jersey. He was a captain of the Morristown High School football team as a center and linebacker, earning all-conference honors as a senior in 1988. Quinn attended Salisbury University and played for their football team from 1989 to 1993. He joined the team originally as a linebacker but transitioned to the defensive line, recording 135 tackles, two forced fumbles, a fumble recovery, and interception return touchdown during his career. He also participated with the school's track and field team, throwing the shot put, discus, and hammer. Quinn's 168.8 feet (51.5 metres) throw with the hammer was a school record until 2012. Quinn was inducted into Salisbury's Athletic Hall of Fame in 2005.

== Career ==
=== Early coaching (1994–2012) ===
Quinn began his football coaching career as a defensive line coach with the William & Mary Tribe in 1994 and the VMI Keydets in 1995. From 1996 to 1999, Quinn served as the defensive line coach for the Hofstra Pride and their defensive coordinator in 2000. He was hired as a defensive quality control coach by the San Francisco 49ers in 2001. Quinn was promoted to defensive line coach in 2003, later working the same role for the Miami Dolphins (2005–2006), New York Jets (2007–2008), and Seattle Seahawks (2009–2010). He also served as defensive coordinator of the Florida Gators in 2011 and 2012.

=== Seattle Seahawks (2013–2014) ===
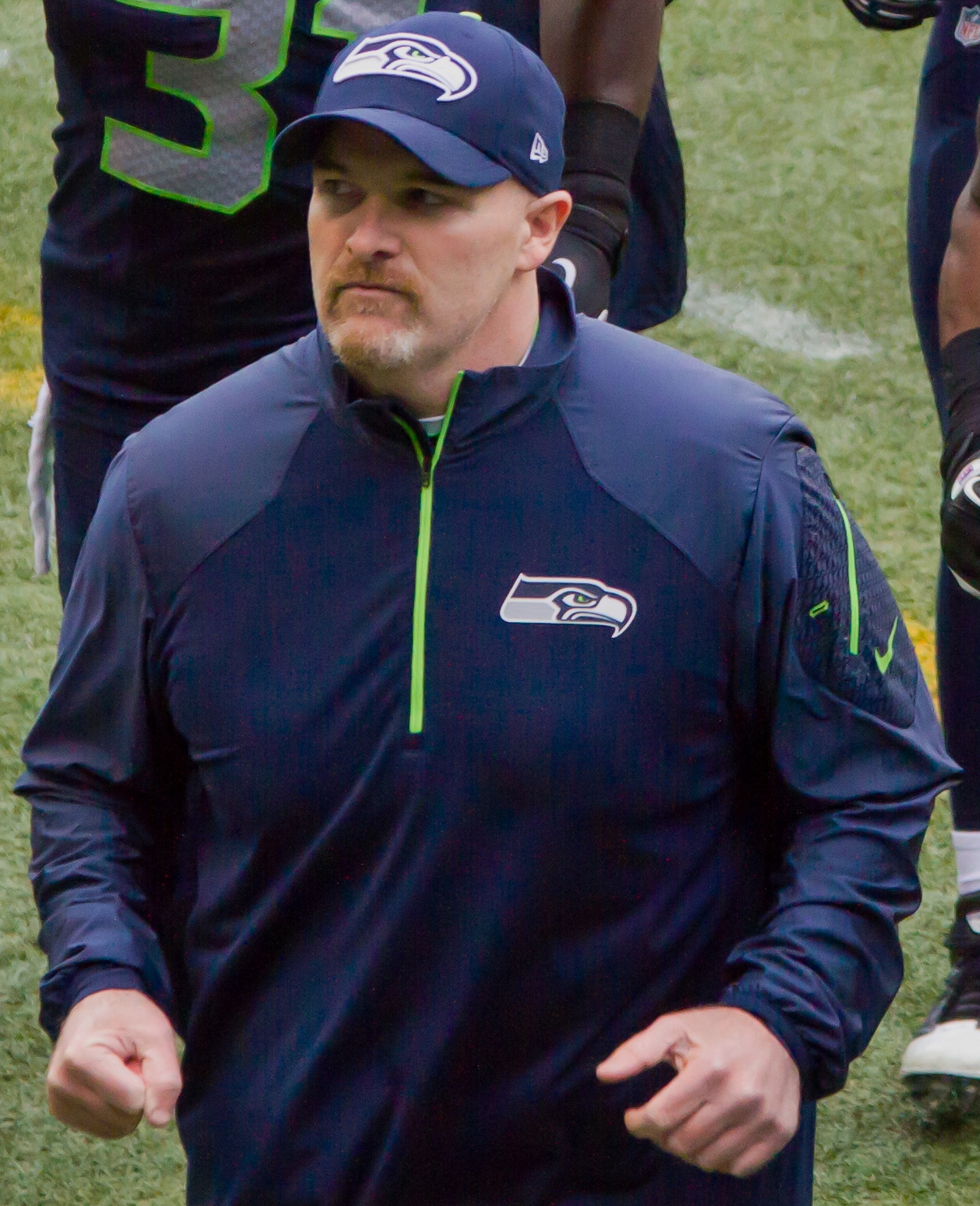
Quinn in 2013

On January 17, 2013, Quinn was hired by the Seahawks as their defensive coordinator under head coach Pete Carroll. In his first season, the Seahawks led the league in fewest points allowed (231), fewest yards allowed (4,378), and turnovers (39), to become the first team since the 1985 Chicago Bears to accomplish the feat; the Seahawks went on to win Super Bowl XLVIII over the Denver Broncos 43–8.

The Seahawks returned to Super Bowl XLIX the following year, losing to the New England Patriots 28–24. Carroll and Quinn were credited with developing the Seattle Cover 3 defense led by a strong secondary known as the Legion of Boom.

=== Atlanta Falcons (2015–2020) ===
==== 2015 season ====
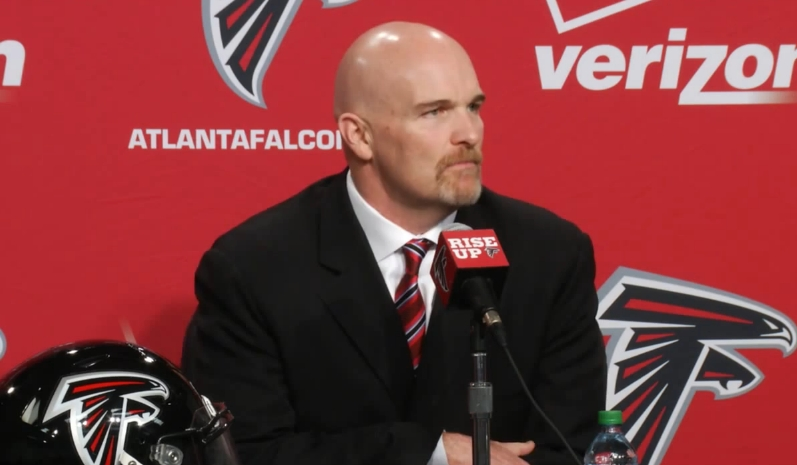
Quinn's introductory press conference as Atlanta Falcons head coach in 2015

On February 2, 2015, Quinn was hired as head coach of the Atlanta Falcons. He won his first game as head coach on Monday Night Football. The Falcons started 5–0 before finishing the season 8–8 and missing the playoffs.

==== 2016 season ====
In the 2016 season, the Falcons finished atop the NFC South with an 11–5 record. In the Divisional Round, they defeated the Seattle Seahawks 36–20 before defeating the Green Bay Packers in the NFC Championship, advancing to Super Bowl LI. In the Super Bowl, the Falcons gave up a 28–3 lead in the third quarter, the largest in Super Bowl history. Quinn won the 2016 Salute to Service award at the 6th NFL Honors.

==== 2017 season ====
Quinn speaking at the 2017 NFL Combine

In the 2017 season, the Falcons finished the year 10–6, which was only good enough for third in the NFC South, but also good enough for the #6-seed in the playoffs. In the Wild Card Round, the Falcons defeated the #3-seed Los Angeles Rams by a score of 26–13 and advanced to the Divisional Round. In the Divisional Round, the Falcons lost on the road to the eventual Super Bowl champion Philadelphia Eagles by a score of 15–10.

==== 2018 season ====
In the 2018 season, the Falcons were injury riddled throughout the season, losing seven starters to injured reserve and more for at least a game. Ultimately, the team finished 7–9, which placed the Falcons at second in the NFC South, and as the #8-seed in the NFC, missing the playoffs for the first time since 2015. Following the firing of defensive coordinator Marquand Manuel, Quinn took on the position of defensive coordinator for the Falcons.

==== 2019 season ====
In the 2019 season, the Falcons started the first half of the season going 1–7 with growing speculation that Falcons owner Arthur Blank would fire Quinn sometime during or at the end of the season. However, after a defensive turnaround with Quinn distributing some of the defensive play-calling duties to assistants, the team finished the season at 7–9, again placing second in the NFC South and missing the playoffs for a second consecutive year. Blank announced that Quinn would return for the 2020 season after the season.

==== 2020 season ====
The Falcons began the 2020 season with a 38–24 loss to the Seattle Seahawks. This loss marked Quinn's 40th loss of his head coaching career including playoff losses. On October 11, 2020, after an 0–5 start to the season, the Falcons' first since 1997, Quinn, along with general manager Thomas Dimitroff, was fired by the Falcons. The team named defensive coordinator Raheem Morris as the interim head coach. Quinn finished his tenure in Atlanta with a 43–42 (.506) regular season record, 3–2 (.600) playoff record and a 46–44 (.511) career record.

=== Dallas Cowboys (2021–2023) ===
On January 11, 2021, Quinn was hired by the Dallas Cowboys replacing Mike Nolan as defensive coordinator under head coach Mike McCarthy. Quinn stepped in as acting head coach in a game against the New Orleans Saints after McCarthy had tested positive for COVID-19. In Quinn's first season as the Cowboys' defensive coordinator, the team finished atop the NFC East with a 12–5 record. A year after the Cowboys allowed a franchise-record 473 points and second-most rushing yards in franchise history, Quinn's defensive unit ranked 19th in the league in yards allowed per play (5.5), eighth in opponent's points per game (21.2) and first in turnovers (34). He was named the season's Assistant Coach of the Year. Quinn agreed to a contract extension with the team in January 2022. Under his tenure, Quinn's defenses led the league in turnovers from 2021 to 2023.

=== Washington Commanders (2024–present) ===
==== 2024 season ====
On February 3, 2024, Quinn was named head coach of the Washington Commanders. He hired former Texas Tech and Arizona Cardinals head coach Kliff Kingsbury as offensive coordinator and Cowboys secondary coach Joe Whitt Jr. as defensive coordinator. Quinn and general manager Adam Peters selected quarterback Jayden Daniels with the second pick in the 2024 NFL draft, who would have the most rushing yards and highest pass completion rate by a rookie quarterback in NFL history. The season also featured the Hail Maryland, a Hail Mary pass play thrown by Daniels as time expired to win against the Chicago Bears.

The Commanders finished the 2024 season with a 12–5 record, their highest win total since 1991 and most by a head coach in his first year with the team. In the 2024–25 NFL playoffs, the team defeated the Tampa Bay Buccaneers and Detroit Lions before losing to the Philadelphia Eagles in the NFC Championship Game.

==== 2025 season ====
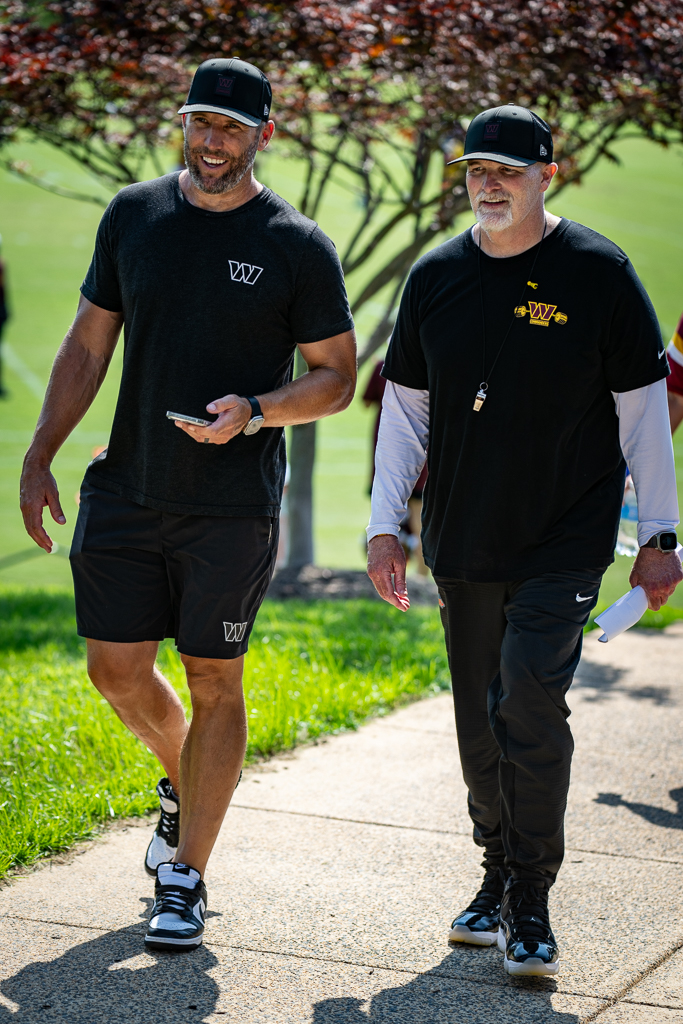
Commanders general manager Adam Peters with Quinn, 2025

During Week 9 of the 2025 season against the Seattle Seahawks, starting quarterback Jayden Daniels suffered a dislocated left elbow on a sack late in the game. The injury was expected to sideline him indefinitely. The coaching decision to keep playing him down 38–7 against the Seahawks late in the fourth quarter, in which Daniels had already taken several tackles and hits, faced criticism. Quinn took accountability for leaving Daniels in the game and said it was a mistake. Following a five-game losing streak with the Commanders losing by 21 or more points in four consecutive games, Quinn announced that he would be taking over as interim defensive coordinator while Whitt would remain on his coaching staff in a demoted role on November 10, 2025. On January 6, 2026, Quinn moved on from both Kingsbury and Whitt as his coordinators.

==== 2026 season ====
In 2026, Quinn promoted David Blough, who previously was his assistant quarterbacks coach, as offensive coordinator and hired Daronte Jones as defensive coordinator.

== Head coaching record ==
Team	Year	Regular season					Postseason			
Team	Year	Won	Lost	Ties	Win %	Finish	Won	Lost	Win %	Result
ATL	2015	8	8	0	.500	2nd in NFC South	—	—	—	—
ATL	2016	11	5	0	.688	1st in NFC South	2	1	.667	Lost to New England Patriots in Super Bowl LI
ATL	2017	10	6	0	.625	3rd in NFC South	1	1	.500	Lost to Philadelphia Eagles in NFC Divisional Game
ATL	2018	7	9	0	.438	2nd in NFC South	—	—	—	—
ATL	2019	7	9	0	.438	2nd in NFC South	—	—	—	—
ATL	2020	0	5	0	.000	Fired	—	—	—	—
ATL total		43	42	0	.506		3	2	.600	
WAS	2024	12	5	0	.706	2nd in NFC East	2	1	.667	Lost to Philadelphia Eagles in NFC Championship Game
WAS	2025	5	12	0	.294	3rd in NFC East	—	—	—	—
WAS	2026	3	5	1	.389	TBD in NFC East	—	—	—	—
WAS total		20	22	1	.477		2	1	.667	
Total		63	64	1	.496		5	3	.625	

== Personal life ==
Quinn met his wife Stacey while attending Salisbury University. Quinn often wears a baseball cap backwards during games, starting the practice during his time with the Cowboys in the early 2020s. In 2025, he was awarded the Ted Stevens Leadership Award by the Tragedy Assistance Program for Survivors (TAPS) for his work supporting families of U.S. military personnel who died while serving. Quinn performed voice-over work in the announcement trailer of the 2025 video game Madden NFL 26. Quinn gave a commencement speech at Salisbury in May 2025 and received an honorary doctorate degree from the school.

== Coaching tree ==
Quinn has worked under eleven head coaches:

- Jimmye Laycock, William & Mary (1994)
- Bill Stewart, VMI (1995)
- Joe Gardi, Hofstra (1996–2000)
- Steve Mariucci, San Francisco 49ers (2001–2002)
- Dennis Erickson, San Francisco 49ers (2003–2004)
- Nick Saban, Miami Dolphins (2005–2006)
- Eric Mangini, New York Jets (2007–2008)
- Jim L. Mora, Seattle Seahawks (2009)
- Pete Carroll, Seattle Seahawks (2010; 2013–2014)
- Will Muschamp, Florida (2011–2012)
- Mike McCarthy, Dallas Cowboys (2021–2023)

Seven of Quinn's assistants became NFL or NCAA head coaches:

- Kyle Shanahan, San Francisco 49ers (2017–present)
- Matt LaFleur, Green Bay Packers (2019–present)
- Raheem Morris, Atlanta Falcons (2024–2025)
- Steve Sarkisian, Texas (2021–present)
- Mike McDaniel, Miami Dolphins (2022–2025)
- Tavita Pritchard, Stanford (2026–present)
- Tosh Lupoi, California (2026–present)
