= 6th NFL Honors =

2017 American football awards ceremony

- Date: February 4, 2017
- Site: Wortham Theater Center (Houston, Texas)
- Hosted by: Keegan-Michael Key

Television coverage
- Network: Fox
- Duration: 2 hours

The 6th NFL Honors was an awards presentation by the National Football League that honored its best players from the 2016 NFL season. It was held on February 4, 2017 and aired on Fox in the United States at 8:00 PM EST. It was hosted by Keegan-Michael Key.

== List of award winners ==
Award	Player	Position	Team	Ref
AP MVP	Matt Ryan	QB	Atlanta Falcons	
AP Coach of the Year	Jason Garrett	HC	Dallas Cowboys	
AP Assistant Coach of the Year	Kyle Shanahan	OC	Atlanta Falcons	
AP Offensive Player of the Year	Matt Ryan	QB	Atlanta Falcons	
AP Defensive Player of the Year	Khalil Mack	LB	Oakland Raiders	
Pepsi NEXT Rookie of the Year	Dak Prescott	QB	Dallas Cowboys	
AP Offensive Rookie of the Year	Dak Prescott	QB	Dallas Cowboys	
AP Defensive Rookie of the Year	Joey Bosa	DE	San Diego Chargers	
AP Comeback Player of the Year	Jordy Nelson	WR	Green Bay Packers	
NFL.com Fantasy Player of the Year	David Johnson	RB	Arizona Cardinals	
Don Shula NFL High School Coach of the Year award	Randy Allen	HC	Highland Park High School (Texas)	
Walter Payton NFL Man of the Year award	Eli Manning & Larry Fitzgerald	QB & WR	New York Giants & Arizona Cardinals	
FedEx Air Player of the Year	Matt Ryan	QB	Atlanta Falcons	
FedEx Ground Player of the Year	Ezekiel Elliott	RB	Dallas Cowboys	
Bridgestone Performance Play of the Year	Mike Evans	WR	Tampa Bay Buccaneers	
Greatness on the Road award	Le'Veon Bell	RB	Pittsburgh Steelers	
Salute to Service award	Dan Quinn	HC	Atlanta Falcons	
Deacon Jones Award	Vic Beasley	LB	Atlanta Falcons	
Art Rooney Award	Frank Gore	RB	Indianapolis Colts	
Castrol EDGE Clutch Performer of the Year	Derek Carr	QB	Oakland Raiders	
Built Ford Tough Offensive Line of the Year	Travis Frederick, Doug Free, Ronald Leary, Zack Martin, Tyron Smith	OL	Dallas Cowboys	
Pro Football Hall of Fame Class of 2017	LaDainian Tomlinson, Morten Andersen, Jason Taylor, Kenny Easley, Jerry Jones, Terrell Davis, Kurt Warner			
