= 2016 NFL season =

American football season

Regular season
- Duration: September 8, 2016 – January 1, 2017

Playoffs
- Start date: January 7, 2017
- AFC Champions: New England Patriots
- NFC Champions: Atlanta Falcons

Super Bowl LI
- Date: February 5, 2017
- Site: NRG Stadium, Houston
- Champions: New England Patriots

Pro Bowl
- Date: January 29, 2017
- Site: Camping World Stadium, Orlando, Florida

AFC teams: West, North, South, East
NFC teams: West, North, South, East

The 2016 NFL season was the 97th season in the history of the National Football League (NFL) and the 51st of the Super Bowl era. The season began on September 8, 2016, with the defending Super Bowl 50 champion Denver Broncos defeating the Carolina Panthers in the NFL Kickoff Game in a rematch of the Super Bowl. The season concluded with Super Bowl LI, the league's championship game on February 5, 2017, at NRG Stadium in Houston with the New England Patriots defeating the Atlanta Falcons 34–28. For the first time since the 2003 NFL season, neither of the previous season's Super Bowl participants made the playoffs.

The former St. Louis Rams moved out of St. Louis, Missouri and returned to the Los Angeles metropolitan area, its home from 1946 to 1994. This was the first time an NFL team relocated to another state since the Houston Oilers relocated to Tennessee in 1997. (Note: The Oilers received approval to relocate to Nashville, Tennessee in 1997, but elected to play at Liberty Bowl Memorial Stadium in Memphis for one season while the Nashville venue now known as Nissan Stadium was under construction.)

After playing in San Diego for 56 years, the 2016 season was the last season for the San Diego Chargers before their return to the city of Los Angeles for 2017, where the franchise was based for their first season in 1960.

This would be the first season in which the Super Bowl went into overtime, and the last until 2023.

== Player movements and retirements ==
The 2016 NFL league year began on March 9, 2016, at 4:00 p.m. ET. On March 7 clubs started to contact and enter into contract negotiations with the certified agents of players who became unrestricted free agents upon the expiration of their 2015 contracts two days later. On March 9, clubs exercised options for 2016 on players who have option clauses in their 2015 contracts, submitted qualifying offers to their restricted free agents with expiring contracts and to whom desire to retain a Right of Refusal/Compensation, submitted a Minimum Salary Tender to retain exclusive negotiating rights to their players with expiring 2015 contracts and who have fewer than three accrued season of free agent credit, and teams were required to be under the salary cap, using the "Top-51" definition (in which the 51 highest-paid players on the team's payroll must have a collective salary cap hit below the actual cap). All 2015 players contracts expired and trading period for 2016 begin.

This season's salary cap increased to $155.27 million per team, up from $143.28 million in 2015.

=== Free agency ===
A total of 496 players were eligible for some form of free agency at the beginning of the free agency period. In addition, a number of highly paid players were released after the start of the league year to allow their teams to regain space under the salary cap. Among the notable players who changed teams via free agency were:

- Quarterbacks Robert Griffin III (Washington to Cleveland) and Brock Osweiler (Denver to Houston)
- Running backs Matt Forte (Chicago to New York Jets), Chris Ivory (New York Jets to Jacksonville) Lamar Miller (Miami to Houston), and Alfred Morris (Washington to Dallas)
- Wide receivers Travis Benjamin (Cleveland to San Diego), Marvin Jones (Cincinnati to Detroit), Rishard Matthews (Miami to Tennessee), and Mohamed Sanu (Cincinnati to Atlanta)
- Tight ends Coby Fleener (Indianapolis to New Orleans) and Benjamin Watson (New Orleans to Baltimore)
- Offensive linemen Alex Boone (San Francisco to Minnesota), Alex Mack (Cleveland to Atlanta), Russell Okung (Seattle to Denver), Kelechi Osemele (Baltimore to Oakland), Mitchell Schwartz (Cleveland to Kansas City), Donald Stephenson (Kansas City to Denver),
- Defensive linemen Damon Harrison (New York Jets to New York Giants) Malik Jackson (Denver to Jacksonville), Brandon Mebane (Seattle to San Diego), and Olivier Vernon (Miami to New York Giants)
- Linebackers Demario Davis (New York Jets to Cleveland), Bruce Irvin (Seattle to Oakland), and Danny Trevathan (Denver to Chicago)
- Defensive backs Prince Amukamara (New York Giants to Jacksonville), Tashaun Gipson (Cleveland to Jacksonville), Casey Hayward (Green Bay to San Diego), Janoris Jenkins (Los Angeles to New York Giants), Rodney McLeod (Los Angeles to Philadelphia), Josh Norman (Carolina to Washington), Sean Smith (Kansas City to Oakland), and Eric Weddle (San Diego to Baltimore)

=== Trades ===
- March 9: Philadelphia traded CB Byron Maxwell, LB Kiko Alonso, and a 2016 first round pick to Miami in exchange for a 2016 first-round draft pick.
- March 9: Philadelphia traded RB DeMarco Murray along with a 2016 fourth round pick to Tennessee in exchange for a 2016 fourth round pick.
- March 11: Philadelphia traded QB Mark Sanchez to Denver in exchange for a conditional 2017 seventh-round draft pick.
- March 15: New England traded DE Chandler Jones to Arizona in exchange for G Jonathan Cooper and a 2016 second round pick.
- March 16: Chicago traded TE Martellus Bennett along with a 2016 sixth round pick to New England in exchange for a 2016 fourth round pick.
- April 9: Denver traded OT Ryan Clady and a 2016 seventh round pick to the New York Jets in exchange for a 2016 fifth round pick.
- August 16: Tennessee traded WR Dorial Green-Beckham to Philadelphia in exchange for G Dennis Kelly.
- September 3: Philadelphia traded QB Sam Bradford to Minnesota for a 2017 first round pick and conditional 2018 fourth round pick.
- October 31: the New England traded LB Jamie Collins, Sr. to Cleveland for a conditional 2017 third round pick.

=== Notable retirements ===
- DE Jared Allen – Five-time Pro Bowler and four-time first-team All-Pro. Played for Kansas City, Minnesota, Chicago, and Carolina during his 12-year career.
- RB Arian Foster – Four-time Pro Bowler and three-time All-Pro (two first-team, one second-team). Played for Houston and Miami during his eight-year career.
- WR Calvin Johnson – Six-time Pro Bowler and four-time All-Pro (three first-team, one second-team). Played for Detroit during his entire nine-year career.
- RB Marshawn Lynch – Five-time Pro Bowler, two-time All-Pro (one first-team, one second-team), and Super Bowl XLVIII champion. Played for Buffalo and Seattle during his nine-year career. Prior to the 2017 season, Lynch came out of retirement, signing with Oakland.
- G Logan Mankins - Seven-time Pro Bowler and six-time All-Pro (one first-team, five second-team). Played for New England and Tampa Bay during his 11-year career.
- QB Peyton Manning – Fourteen-time Pro Bowler, 10-time All-Pro (seven first-team, three second-team), first overall selection in the 1998 NFL draft, five-time NFL MVP (2003, 2004, 2008, 2009, and 2013), two-time Offensive Player of the Year (2004 and 2013), two-time Super Bowl champion (XLI and 50), Super Bowl XLI MVP, 2005 Walter Payton Man of the Year, and 2012 Comeback Player of the year. Played for the Indianapolis and Denver during his 18-year career.
- S Charles Woodson – Nine-time Pro Bowler, eight-time All-Pro (four first-team, four second-team), 2009 Defensive Player of the Year, and Super Bowl XLV champion. Played for Oakland and Green Bay during his 18-year career.

=== Others ===
- Husain Abdullah
- Jon Beason
- Chris Clemons
- Darnell Dockett
- D'Brickashaw Ferguson
- Daniel Fells
- Matt Hasselbeck
- Greg Jennings
- Phil Loadholt
- Rashean Mathis
- Jerod Mayo
- Heath Miller
- Lance Moore
- Manny Ramirez
- Antrel Rolle
- A.J. Tarpley
- Walter Thurmond
- Charles Tillman
- Justin Tuck

=== Draft ===
The 2016 NFL draft was held between April 28 − April 30, 2016, in Chicago. By way of a trade with the Tennessee Titans, the Los Angeles Rams held the first overall pick and selected QB Jared Goff.

== Rule changes ==
The following rule changes were approved for the 2016 NFL season at the owners' meeting on March 22:

- Allowing the offensive and defensive play callers on the coaching staffs to use the coach-to-player communication system regardless of whether they are on the field or in the coaches' booth.
- Permanently adopting the extra-point rules enacted in the 2015 NFL season. Extra point kicks will be from the 15 yard line, and defenses can return blocked PAT's, fumbles or interceptions on two-point tries for a two-point defensive conversion.
- Outlaw all chop blocks anywhere on the field. Previously, the chop block was legal when an offensive lineman chops a defensive player "while the defensive player is physically engaged above the waist by the blocking attempt of another offensive teammate".
- Expand the definition of a "horse-collar tackle" to include tackles where a player is grabbed by the jersey at or above the name plate and dragged to the ground.
- Making the act of calling time-out when not permitted to do so subject to a delay-of-game penalty (5 yards).
- Changing from a five-yard penalty to a loss of down when a receiver goes out of bounds and comes back in to illegally touch a forward pass.
- Eliminating multiple spots of enforcement for a double foul committed after a change of possession.
- The umpire will now line up in the offensive backfield directly across from the referee at all times in the game, ending the practice of the umpire moving behind the defensive line when the offense is inside the five-yard line or in the final 2:00 of the first half & the final 5:00 of the second half.

The following changes were approved for only the 2016 NFL season at the owners' meeting on March 23. Both were subject to become permanent rules or scrapped for 2017.

- Moving the touchback spot after kickoffs and other free kicks to the 25-yard line, similar to the NCAA rule adopted in the 2012 season (a touchback after a turnover or punt will still be placed on the 20-yard line). The goal for this rule change is to decrease the number of kickoff returns: kick returners may be more reluctant to bring the ball out from the end zone because of the greater risk of being tackled before reaching the 25-yard line. NFL officials concede that this may in fact increase kickoff returns because kickers may instead attempt to pin returners inside the 10-yard line. This rule was made permanent in 2018.
- Players committing two unsportsmanlike conduct penalties in the same game will be automatically ejected from the game. This was in response to New York Giants wide receiver Odell Beckham Jr. committing three personal fouls in one game against the Carolina Panthers cornerback Josh Norman without being ejected. This change is being referred to as the "Odell Beckham Rule". NFL officials, however, clarify that this new rule would not have ejected Beckham since he committed personal fouls and not unsportsmanlike conduct penalties.

The following changes to instant replay rules were approved for the 2016 NFL season at the owners' meeting on May 24:

- Refining what is a reviewable play, including the following:
  - Plays involving possession.
  - Plays involving touching of either the ball or the ground.
  - Plays governed by the goal line.
  - Plays governed by the boundary lines.
  - Plays governed by the line of scrimmage.
  - Plays governed by the line to gain (1st down).
  - Number of players on the field at the snap.
  - Game administration (which includes correct application of the playing rules, proper down, spot of the foul for penalty application, and game clock status (running clock, not running clock, end of period)

Additional rule updates made for the 2016 season include:

- Banning players from wearing hoodies under their uniform shirts. This was adopted in response to Green Bay Packers wide receiver James Jones using that style in the 2015 season, which hid his name plate under the hood.
- Banning any coaches except for the head coach from entering the field of play, and then only to check on an injured player. This was in response to the incident involving Pittsburgh Steelers assistant coach Joey Porter and several Cincinnati Bengals players, especially Adam Jones, during the 2015–16 NFL playoffs.
- If the coin does not flip (as it did during the 2015–16 NFL Playoff game between the Green Bay Packers and the Arizona Cardinals), during the pre-game or pre-OT toss, the Referee can re-toss the coin using the captain's original call.
- Practice squads can now have up to four players with two seasons of experience, an increase from the two players allowed the previous two years.
- Injury reports will no longer include the "probable" designation. The league had discouraged using the designation for anything beyond minor injuries after 2005 (in a game in which Michael Vick, listed as probable on the injury report, also was listed as inactive), to the point where almost all of the players who were being listed as probable ultimately played. The "questionable" category will now be broadened to include any injury that could possibly prevent a player from entering the game, while the "doubtful" category will likewise be generalized to include any player who is more likely to not play than play. Prior to 2016, each designation represented the approximate odds of the player seeing any playing time: 75 percent for probable, 50 percent for questionable and 25 percent for doubtful.

== 2016 deaths ==
The following people associated with the NFL (or AFL) died in 2016.

Dennis Green

Dennis Green died July 21. Green was named the head coach of the Minnesota Vikings in 1992, becoming the second full-time black head coach in NFL history (Art Shell, who had been hired for the Los Angeles Raiders three years prior, was the first). Green spent ten years coaching the Vikings, eight of them being playoff seasons, but never made it to the Super Bowl. He then took over the Arizona Cardinals from 2004 to 2006, to much less success, most infamously in the Monday Night Meltdown, in which he let off a tirade after losing a game. Green had also spent time as an assistant coach with the San Francisco 49ers and as a broadcast commentator. Green was 67.

Winston Hill

Winston Hill died on April 26. Hill, an offensive tackle for the New York Jets for 13 seasons and spent the last one with the Los Angeles Rams. He was a four-time Pro Bowler and a three-time Second-Team All-Pro. He also won Super Bowl III in 1968 with the Jets. He was posthumously inducted into the Hall of Fame in 2020. Hill was 74.

Buddy Ryan

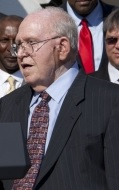
Buddy Ryan

James "Buddy" Ryan died June 28. Ryan, a head coach and defensive coordinator who served with six NFL teams over the course of his career, was credited with inventing the 46 defense. His contributions to the game were considered crucial to helping the New York Jets secure an upset win in Super Bowl III and played a key role in the Chicago Bears' rout in Super Bowl XX. His sons, Rex and Rob, were both coaches with the Buffalo Bills at the time (a team the elder Ryan turned down a coaching offer from in the early years of his career). Ryan was 85.

== Regular season ==
The 2016 regular season featured 256 games which were played out over a seventeen-week schedule beginning on Thursday, September 8, 2016. Each of the league's 32 teams played a 16-game schedule, with one bye week for each team scheduled between weeks 4–13. The slate also featured games on Monday night. There were games played on Thursday, including the National Football League Kickoff game in prime time on September 8 and games on Thanksgiving Day. The regular season concluded with a full slate of 16 games on Sunday, January 1, 2017, all of which were intra-divisional matchups, as it has been since 2010.

Scheduling formula

Under the NFL's current scheduling formula, each team played each of the other three teams in its own division twice. In addition, a team played against all four teams in one other division from each conference. The final two games on a team's schedule were against the two teams in the team's own conference in the two divisions the team was not set to play which finished the previous season in the same rank in their division (e.g. the team which finished first in its division the previous season played each other team in its conference that also finished first in its respective division). The pre-set division pairings for 2016 were:

Intra-conference
AFC North vs. AFC East
AFC South vs. AFC West
NFC North vs. NFC East
NFC South vs. NFC West

Inter-conference
AFC East vs. NFC West
AFC North vs. NFC East
AFC South vs. NFC North
AFC West vs. NFC South

The complete 2016 schedule was released on April 14, 2016. Highlights of the 2016 schedule included:

- NFL Kickoff Game: The 2016 season began with the Kickoff Game on September 8. The 2015 champion Denver Broncos hosted and defeated the Carolina Panthers 21–20 in a rematch of Super Bowl 50, marking the first time since the Kickoff game was established that it was a rematch of the previous Super Bowl, and the first such meeting of both Super Bowl participants during the first week of the next season since the 1970 season (when the Minnesota Vikings and Kansas City Chiefs held a rematch of Super Bowl IV to kick off the new post-merger era). The Broncos debuted Trevor Siemian as their new starting quarterback; Siemian had been the Broncos' third-string quarterback and ascended to the starting position after Peyton Manning, their starting quarterback for the 2012 through 2015 seasons, retired following Super Bowl 50, and second-stringer Brock Osweiler left as a free agent for the Houston Texans.
- International Series: Four games were played internationally this season. Three of the games were played in London, England and the fourth was played in Mexico City, Mexico. The Jacksonville Jaguars played host to and defeated the Indianapolis Colts 30–27 on October 2 at Wembley Stadium, marking the fourth of at least eight consecutive years in which the Jaguars hosted a game in London. On October 23, in the first NFL game at Twickenham Stadium also in London, the Los Angeles Rams hosted and were defeated by the New York Giants 17–10. The Cincinnati Bengals played host to and tied with the Washington Redskins 27–27 on October 30 at Wembley Stadium in London. Finally, on Monday, November 21, the Oakland Raiders hosted and defeated the Houston Texans 27–20 at Estadio Azteca in Mexico City, in the first Monday night game to be played outside of the United States and the second regular-season contest to be held in Mexico (the first being the 2005 Fútbol Americano contest.)
- Thanksgiving Day games: As has been the case since 2006, three games were played on Thursday, November 24, 2016. The Detroit Lions hosted and defeated the Minnesota Vikings 16–13, the Dallas Cowboys hosted and defeated the Washington Redskins 31–26, and the evening game, the first Thanksgiving game to feature teams from the AFC since 2013, featured the Indianapolis Colts hosting and being defeated by the Pittsburgh Steelers 28–7.
- Christmas games: Christmas Day, December 25, fell on a Sunday in 2016. The Sunday afternoon games were moved to Saturday, Christmas Eve, and joined by a Thursday Night Special game between the Cincinnati Bengals and the Houston Texans; the Texans won 12–10. Two nationally televised games were played on Christmas Day; a late-afternoon Thursday Night Special game was played between the Baltimore Ravens and Pittsburgh Steelers; the Steelers won 31–27, while Sunday Night Football was played between the Denver Broncos and Kansas City Chiefs; the Chiefs won 33–10.

=== In-season scheduling changes ===
- Pro Football Hall of Fame Game: The 2016 edition of the preseason Hall of Fame Game, between Green Bay and Indianapolis, was canceled due to unsafe playing conditions at Tom Benson Hall of Fame Stadium in Canton, Ohio, caused by the use of improper paints applied to the field to create the Hall of Fame logo and other markings.
- Week 8: The Green Bay–Atlanta game, originally scheduled for 1:00 p.m. ET, was switched to 4:25 p.m. ET in place of the originally-scheduled Arizona–Carolina game, which was originally scheduled for 4:25 p.m. ET (both games still on Fox).
- Week 12: The Kansas City–Denver game, originally scheduled for 4:25 p.m. ET on CBS, was flexed into the 8:30 p.m. ET slot on NBC's Sunday Night Football, in place of the originally-scheduled New England–New York Jets game, which was moved to 4:25 p.m. ET on CBS.
- Week 14: The New Orleans–Tampa Bay game, originally scheduled for 1:00 p.m. ET, was switched to 4:25 p.m. ET, still on Fox. The Bears–Lions game was "cross-flexed" from Fox to CBS, still at 1:00 p.m. ET.
- Week 15: The Tampa Bay–Dallas game, originally scheduled for 1:00 p.m. ET on Fox, was flexed into the 8:30 p.m. ET slot on NBC's Sunday Night Football, in place of the originally-scheduled Pittsburgh–Cincinnati game, which was moved to 1:00 p.m. ET on CBS.
- Week 16: The Tampa Bay–New Orleans game, originally scheduled for 1:00 p.m. ET on Fox, was switched to 4:25 p.m. ET (still on Fox).
- Week 17: The Green Bay–Detroit game, which was originally scheduled for 1:00 p.m. ET on Fox, was selected for the final 8:30 p.m. NBC Sunday Night Football game, which for the second consecutive season decided the NFC North division champion. Also, the New Orleans–Atlanta game and the New York Giants–Washington game were moved from 1:00 p.m. ET to 4:25 p.m. ET, with both games still on Fox.

== Regular season standings ==
=== Division ===
AFC East
	W	L	T	PCT	DIV	CONF	PF	PA	STK
^{(1)} New England Patriots	14	2	0	.875	5–1	11–1	441	250	W7
^{(6)} Miami Dolphins	10	6	0	.625	4–2	7–5	363	380	L1
Buffalo Bills	7	9	0	.438	1–5	4–8	399	378	L2
New York Jets	5	11	0	.313	2–4	4–8	275	409	W1

AFC North
	W	L	T	PCT	DIV	CONF	PF	PA	STK
^{(3)} Pittsburgh Steelers	11	5	0	.688	5–1	9–3	399	327	W7
Baltimore Ravens	8	8	0	.500	4–2	7–5	343	321	L2
Cincinnati Bengals	6	9	1	.406	3–3	5–7	325	315	W1
Cleveland Browns	1	15	0	.063	0–6	1–11	264	452	L1

AFC South
	W	L	T	PCT	DIV	CONF	PF	PA	STK
^{(4)} Houston Texans	9	7	0	.563	5–1	7–5	279	328	L1
Tennessee Titans	9	7	0	.563	2–4	6–6	381	378	W1
Indianapolis Colts	8	8	0	.500	3–3	5–7	411	392	W1
Jacksonville Jaguars	3	13	0	.188	2–4	2–10	318	400	L1

AFC West
	W	L	T	PCT	DIV	CONF	PF	PA	STK
^{(2)} Kansas City Chiefs	12	4	0	.750	6–0	9–3	389	311	W2
^{(5)} Oakland Raiders	12	4	0	.750	3–3	9–3	416	385	L1
Denver Broncos	9	7	0	.563	2–4	6–6	333	297	W1
San Diego Chargers	5	11	0	.313	1–5	4–8	410	423	L5

NFC East
	W	L	T	PCT	DIV	CONF	PF	PA	STK
^{(1)} Dallas Cowboys	13	3	0	.813	3–3	9–3	421	306	L1
^{(5)} New York Giants	11	5	0	.688	4–2	8–4	310	284	W1
Washington Redskins	8	7	1	.531	3–3	6–6	396	383	L1
Philadelphia Eagles	7	9	0	.438	2–4	5–7	367	331	W2

NFC North
	W	L	T	PCT	DIV	CONF	PF	PA	STK
^{(4)} Green Bay Packers	10	6	0	.625	5–1	8–4	432	388	W6
^{(6)} Detroit Lions	9	7	0	.563	3–3	7–5	346	358	L3
Minnesota Vikings	8	8	0	.500	2–4	5–7	327	307	W1
Chicago Bears	3	13	0	.188	2–4	3–9	279	399	L4

NFC South
	W	L	T	PCT	DIV	CONF	PF	PA	STK
^{(2)} Atlanta Falcons	11	5	0	.688	5–1	9–3	540	406	W4
Tampa Bay Buccaneers	9	7	0	.563	4–2	7–5	354	369	W1
New Orleans Saints	7	9	0	.438	2–4	6–6	469	454	L1
Carolina Panthers	6	10	0	.375	1–5	5–7	369	402	L2

NFC West
	W	L	T	PCT	DIV	CONF	PF	PA	STK
^{(3)} Seattle Seahawks	10	5	1	.656	3–2–1	6–5–1	354	292	W1
Arizona Cardinals	7	8	1	.469	4–1–1	6–5–1	418	362	W2
Los Angeles Rams	4	12	0	.250	2–4	3–9	224	394	L7
San Francisco 49ers	2	14	0	.125	2–4	2–10	309	480	L1

=== Conference ===
AFC
#	Team	Division	W	L	T	PCT	DIV	CONF	SOS	SOV	STK
Division leaders
1	New England Patriots	East	14	2	0	.875	5–1	11–1	.439	.424	W7
2 (Note: Kansas City clinched the AFC West division over Oakland based on head-to-head sweep.)	Kansas City Chiefs	West	12	4	0	.750	6–0	9–3	.508	.479	W2
3	Pittsburgh Steelers	North	11	5	0	.688	5–1	9–3	.494	.423	W7
4 (Note: Houston clinched the AFC South division title over Tennessee based on record vs. division opponents.)	Houston Texans	South	9	7	0	.563	5–1	7–5	.502	.427	L1
Wild Cards
5	Oakland Raiders	West	12	4	0	.750	3–3	9–3	.504	.443	L1
6	Miami Dolphins	East	10	6	0	.625	4–2	7–5	.455	.341	L1
Did not qualify for the postseason
7 (Note: Tennessee finished ahead of Denver based on head-to-head victory.)	Tennessee Titans	South	9	7	0	.563	2–4	6–6	.465	.458	W1
8	Denver Broncos	West	9	7	0	.563	2–4	6–6	.549	.455	W1
9 (Note: Baltimore finished ahead of Indianapolis based on record vs. conference opponents.)	Baltimore Ravens	North	8	8	0	.500	4–2	7–5	.498	.363	L2
10	Indianapolis Colts	South	8	8	0	.500	3–3	5–7	.492	.406	W1
11	Buffalo Bills	East	7	9	0	.438	1–5	4–8	.482	.339	L2
12	Cincinnati Bengals	North	6	9	1	.406	3–3	5–7	.521	.333	W1
13 (Note: The New York Jets finished ahead of San Diego based record vs. common opponents — the Jets' cumulative record against Cleveland, Indianapolis, Kansas City and Miami was 1–4, while San Diego's cumulative record against the same four teams was 0–5.)	New York Jets	East	5	11	0	.313	2–4	4–8	.518	.313	W1
14	San Diego Chargers	West	5	11	0	.313	1–5	4–8	.543	.513	L5
15	Jacksonville Jaguars	South	3	13	0	.188	2–4	2–10	.527	.417	L1
16	Cleveland Browns	North	1	15	0	.063	0–6	1–11	.549	.313	L1
Tiebreakers (Note: When breaking ties for three or more teams under the NFL's rules, they are first broken within divisions, then comparing only the highest ranked remaining team from each division.)

NFC
#	Team	Division	W	L	T	PCT	DIV	CONF	SOS	SOV	STK
Division leaders
1	Dallas Cowboys	East	13	3	0	.813	3–3	9–3	.471	.440	L1
2	Atlanta Falcons	South	11	5	0	.688	5–1	9–3	.480	.452	W4
3	Seattle Seahawks	West	10	5	1	.656	3–2–1	6–5–1	.441	.425	W1
4	Green Bay Packers	North	10	6	0	.625	5–1	8–4	.508	.453	W6
Wild Cards
5	New York Giants	East	11	5	0	.688	4–2	8–4	.486	.455	W1
6 (Note: Detroit finished ahead of Tampa Bay for the No. 6 seed and qualified for the last playoff spot based on record vs. common opponents—Detroit's cumulative record against Chicago, Dallas, Los Angeles and New Orleans was 3–2, while Tampa Bay's cumulative record against the same four teams was 2–3.)	Detroit Lions	North	9	7	0	.563	3–3	7–5	.475	.392	L3
Did not qualify for the postseason
7	Tampa Bay Buccaneers	South	9	7	0	.563	4–2	7–5	.492	.434	W1
8	Washington Redskins	East	8	7	1	.531	3–3	6–6	.516	.430	L1
9	Minnesota Vikings	North	8	8	0	.500	2–4	5–7	.492	.457	W1
10	Arizona Cardinals	West	7	8	1	.469	4–1–1	6–5–1	.463	.366	W2
11 (Note: New Orleans finished ahead of Philadelphia based on better record vs. conference opponents.)	New Orleans Saints	South	7	9	0	.438	2–4	6–6	.523	.393	L1
12	Philadelphia Eagles	East	7	9	0	.438	2–4	5–7	.559	.518	W2
13	Carolina Panthers	South	6	10	0	.375	1–5	5–7	.518	.354	L2
14	Los Angeles Rams	West	4	12	0	.250	2–4	3–9	.504	.500	L7
15	Chicago Bears	North	3	13	0	.188	2–4	3–9	.521	.396	L4
16	San Francisco 49ers	West	2	14	0	.125	2–4	2–10	.504	.250	L1
Tiebreakers (Note: When breaking ties for three or more teams under the NFL's rules, they are first broken within divisions, then comparing only the highest-ranked remaining team from each division.)

== Postseason ==
The 2016 playoffs began on the weekend of January 7–8, 2017 with the Wild Card playoff round. The four winners of these playoff games visited the top two seeded teams in each conference in the Divisional round games, which were played on the weekend of January 14–15, 2017. The winners of those games advanced to the Conference championship games, which were held on January 22, 2017. The 2017 Pro Bowl was held at the recently renovated Camping World Stadium (the former Citrus Bowl stadium) in Orlando, Florida on January 29, 2017, and aired on ESPN. Super Bowl LI was held on February 5, 2017, at NRG Stadium in Houston on Fox.

=== Playoffs bracket ===
Jan 8 – Heinz Field	Jan 15 – Arrowhead Stadium
6	Miami	12
3	Pittsburgh	18
3	Pittsburgh	30	Jan 22 – Gillette Stadium
2	Kansas City	16
AFC
Jan 7 – NRG Stadium	3	Pittsburgh	17
Jan 14 – Gillette Stadium
1	New England	36
5	Oakland	14	AFC Championship
4	Houston	16
4	Houston	27	Feb 5 – NRG Stadium
1	New England	34
Wild-card round
Divisional round
Jan 8 – Lambeau Field	A1	New England	34*
Jan 15 – AT&T Stadium
N2	Atlanta	28
5	NY Giants	13	Super Bowl LI
4	Green Bay	34
4	Green Bay	38	Jan 22 – Georgia Dome
1	Dallas	31
NFC
Jan 7 – CenturyLink Field	4	Green Bay	21
Jan 14 – Georgia Dome
2	Atlanta	44
6	Detroit	6	NFC Championship
3	Seattle	20
3	Seattle	26
2	Atlanta	36

* Indicates overtime victory

== Notable events ==
=== Deflategate ===
On April 25, 2016, the 2nd U.S. Circuit Court of Appeals reinstated New England Patriots' quarterback Tom Brady's four-game suspension for the 2016 regular season related to Deflategate; Brady dropped his appeal shortly thereafter and declined to take his case to the Supreme Court.

=== National anthem protests ===
In 2016, several professional athletes protested the United States national anthem. The protests began in the NFL, when San Francisco 49ers' quarterback Colin Kaepernick sat during the anthem, as opposed to the tradition of standing, before a preseason game.

== Records, milestones, and notable statistics ==
Week 1

- Cam Newton scored his 44th career rushing touchdown, surpassing Steve Young for the most career rushing touchdowns by a quarterback in NFL history. Newton, who had scored a passing touchdown in the first quarter, also surpassed Young for the most career games with both a passing touchdown and a rushing touchdown by a quarterback in NFL history, with 32.
- Drew Brees tied Peyton Manning for the most 400-yard passing games in a career (17 overall, regular season and postseason combined) by a quarterback.

Week 4

- Frank Gore surpassed Marshall Faulk for 10th place on the NFL's all-time rushing yards list.
- Matt Ryan and Julio Jones became the first passer/receiver duo in NFL history with 500+ passing yards and 300+ receiving yards in a game.
- Matthew Stafford broke the NFL record previously held by Dan Marino for most passing yards in a player's first 100 games, with 27,174.

Week 5

- Bill Belichick won his 250th career game (including the post-season). He became the fourth head coach to reach this mark joining Don Shula, George Halas and Tom Landry.

Week 6

- Dak Prescott broke the NFL record for most consecutive pass attempts without an interception to start a career, a record previously held by Tom Brady with 162 passes. He ran his streak to 176 pass attempts before throwing his first interception.
- Tom Brady became the fourth player in NFL history to record 5,000 career pass completions, joining Brett Favre, Peyton Manning, and Drew Brees.
- Drew Brees set an NFL record for the most regular season 400-yard passing games in a career with 15. Brees also became the sixth player to record 50,000 passing yards with one team.

Week 7

- Jay Ajayi became the fourth player in NFL history to rush for at least 200 yards in consecutive games, joining O. J. Simpson (who accomplished the feat twice), Earl Campbell and Ricky Williams.
- Adam Vinatieri set a new NFL record for most consecutive regular season field-goals made with 43, breaking the record that was held by Mike Vanderjagt. His streak ended at 44 after a miss in Week 11.
- Matt Ryan set an NFL record for the most consecutive games with at least 200 passing yards, with 46.

Week 8

- The Washington–Cincinnati game ended in a 27–27 tie. It was the first time an International Series game had ended in a tie (and the first such game to have gone into overtime). It also was the first time since 1997 where two games ended in a tie in the same season.
- The Oakland Raiders were penalized 23 times for 200 yards, setting a new NFL record for the most penalties against a team in a single game.

Week 9

- The San Francisco 49ers set an NFL record for allowing an opponent's running back to run for 100 or more yards in seven consecutive games.

Week 10

- Stefon Diggs became the first player in NFL history to have at least 13 catches in consecutive games.
- For the first time in NFL history, two different games on the same day, the Dallas–Pittsburgh matchup and the Seattle–New England matchup, involved at least seven different lead changes.

Week 11

- A single-day record twelve point after touchdown attempts were missed, including three in domed stadiums.
- The Dallas Cowboys gained 417 total net yards, marking the team's eighth consecutive game with at least 400 yards, tied for the longest single-season streak in NFL history (2007 New England Patriots and 2013 Denver Broncos).
- Steve Smith Sr. reached 1,000 catches, becoming the 14th player in NFL history to reach this mark.

Week 12

- Tom Brady joined Peyton Manning as the second starting quarterback in NFL history to record 200 combined regular season and postseason wins. The Patriots' victory made them the first former American Football League franchise to record 500 all-time victories, including playoffs. Brady also became only the fifth quarterback to record 60,000 regular season passing yards, joining Peyton Manning, Brett Favre, Drew Brees and Dan Marino.

Week 13

- Tom Brady broke Peyton Manning's record of most career wins by a quarterback (regular season and playoffs) in NFL history with his 201st win.
- Larry Fitzgerald became the youngest player in NFL history (33 years, 95 days) to reach 1,100 career catches.

Week 14

- Matthew Stafford recorded his eighth fourth quarter comeback win of the season, surpassing the previous record held by Peyton Manning, who led the Indianapolis Colts to seven fourth quarter comeback wins during the 2009 season.
- Anquan Boldin moved past Andre Johnson for tenth on the NFL's all-time receptions list.

Week 15

- The New England Patriots clinched their eighth consecutive AFC East title. They surpassed the Los Angeles Rams, who won the NFC West division title every year from 1973 to 1979, for the most consecutive division titles won by any franchise in NFL history.

Week 16

- The Pittsburgh Steelers recorded the 600th regular-season victory in franchise history, joining the Chicago Bears, Green Bay Packers, and New York Giants as the only teams in NFL history to reach this mark.
- Bill Belichick won his 200th career regular-season game as head coach of the New England Patriots. Belichick became the fifth coach to reach 200 regular-season wins with one team, joining George Halas, Don Shula, Tom Landry and Curly Lambeau.
- Matt Ryan threw a touchdown pass to his 13th different receiver of the season, an NFL record.

Week 17

- Matthew Stafford surpassed 30,000 career passing yards in his 109th game, surpassing Dan Marino and Kurt Warner for the fastest quarterback to reach that mark.
- Sam Bradford achieved a 71.6 completion percentage, surpassing Drew Brees for the record for highest completion percentage in a season.

=== Postseason ===
Division Round

- The Patriots advanced to their sixth consecutive AFC Championship Game, surpassing the 1973–1977 Oakland Raiders for the most consecutive appearances in a conference championship game in history.
- Chris Boswell made a postseason record six field goals.
- Dak Prescott became the first rookie to throw three touchdown passes in a postseason game in the Super Bowl era.
- Dion Lewis became the first player in NFL history to score a rushing, receiving and kickoff return touchdown in a playoff game.

Super Bowl LI

- Super Bowl LI marked an NFL record seventh Super Bowl appearance for Tom Brady and Bill Belichick as a QB-head coach duo.
- Super Bowl LI also marked the New England Patriots' ninth Super Bowl appearance, breaking a record shared with the Dallas Cowboys, Denver Broncos, and Pittsburgh Steelers.
- The Patriots accumulated 37 first downs in the game, an NFL postseason record.
- Tom Brady's 43 pass completions, 62 pass attempts, and 466 passing yards all set new single game Super Bowl records.
- For the first time in NFL history, the Super Bowl went into overtime.
- After trailing 28–3, the Patriots won the game, 34–28, completing the largest comeback win in both team history and Super Bowl history.
- The Atlanta Falcons became the first losing team in Super Bowl history to return an interception for a touchdown; teams returning an interception for a touchdown in the Super Bowl had been a perfect 12–0.

== Regular season statistical leaders ==
Individual
Scoring leader	Matt Bryant, Atlanta (158)
Most field goals made	Justin Tucker, Baltimore (38 FGs)
Touchdowns	David Johnson, Arizona (20 TDs)
Rushing	Ezekiel Elliott, Dallas (1,631 yards)
Passing yards	Drew Brees, New Orleans (5,208 yards)
Passing touchdowns	Aaron Rodgers, Green Bay (40 TDs)
Passer rating	Matt Ryan, Atlanta (117.1 rating)
Pass receptions	Larry Fitzgerald, Arizona (107 catches)
Pass receiving yards	T. Y. Hilton, Indianapolis (1,448 yards)
Combined tackles	Bobby Wagner, Seattle (168 tackles)
Interceptions	Casey Hayward, San Diego (7)
Punting	Johnny Hekker, Los Angeles (4,680 yards, 47.8 average yards)
Sacks	Vic Beasley, Atlanta (15.5)

== Awards ==
=== Individual season awards ===
The 6th NFL Honors, saluting the best players and plays from 2016 season, was held at the Wortham Theater Center in Houston, Texas on February 4, 2017.

Award	Winner	Position	Team
AP Most Valuable Player	Matt Ryan	Quarterback	Atlanta Falcons
AP Offensive Player of the Year	Matt Ryan	Quarterback	Atlanta Falcons
AP Defensive Player of the Year	Khalil Mack	Defensive end	Oakland Raiders
AP Coach of the Year	Jason Garrett	Head coach	Dallas Cowboys
AP Assistant Coach of the Year	Kyle Shanahan	Offensive coordinator	Atlanta Falcons
AP Offensive Rookie of the Year	Dak Prescott	Quarterback	Dallas Cowboys
AP Defensive Rookie of the Year	Joey Bosa	Defensive end	San Diego Chargers
AP Comeback Player of the Year	Jordy Nelson	Wide receiver	Green Bay Packers
Pepsi Rookie of the Year	Dak Prescott	Quarterback	Dallas Cowboys
Walter Payton NFL Man of the Year	Larry Fitzgerald; Eli Manning	Wide receiver Quarterback	Arizona Cardinals; New York Giants
PFWA NFL Executive of the Year	Reggie McKenzie	General Manager	Oakland Raiders
Super Bowl Most Valuable Player	Tom Brady	Quarterback	New England Patriots

=== All-Pro team ===
The following players were named First Team All-Pro by the Associated Press:

Offense
Quarterback	Matt Ryan, Atlanta
Running back	Ezekiel Elliott, Dallas
Flex	David Johnson, Arizona
Wide receiver	Antonio Brown, Pittsburgh; Julio Jones, Atlanta
Tight end	Travis Kelce, Kansas City
Left tackle	Tyron Smith, Dallas
Left guard	Kelechi Osemele, Oakland
Center	Travis Frederick, Dallas
Right guard	Zack Martin, Dallas
Right tackle	Jack Conklin, Tennessee

Defense
Edge rusher	Khalil Mack, Oakland; Vic Beasley, Atlanta
Interior lineman	Aaron Donald, Los Angeles; Damon Harrison, New York Giants
Linebacker	Von Miller, Denver; Bobby Wagner, Seattle; Sean Lee, Dallas
Cornerback	Aqib Talib, Denver; Marcus Peters, Kansas City
Safety	Landon Collins, New York Giants; Eric Berry, Kansas City

Special teams
Placekicker	Justin Tucker, Baltimore
Punter	Johnny Hekker, Los Angeles
Kick returner	Cordarrelle Patterson, Minnesota
Special teams	Matthew Slater, New England

=== Players of the week/month ===
The following were named the top performers during the 2016 season:

Week/ Month	Offensive Player of the Week/Month		Defensive Player of the Week/Month		Special Teams Player of the Week/Month	
Week/ Month	AFC	NFC	AFC	NFC	AFC	NFC
1	DeAngelo Williams (Steelers)	Jameis Winston (Buccaneers)	Whitney Mercilus (Texans)	Eric Kendricks (Vikings)	Stephen Gostkowski (Patriots)	Sam Martin (Lions)
2	Ryan Fitzpatrick (Jets)	Stefon Diggs (Vikings)	Von Miller (Broncos)	Marcus Cooper (Cardinals)	Lawrence Guy (Ravens)	Janoris Jenkins (Giants)
3	Trevor Siemian (Broncos)	Carson Wentz (Eagles)	Marcus Peters (Chiefs)	Everson Griffen (Vikings)	Ryan Allen (Patriots)	Dustin Hopkins (Redskins)
Sept.	LeGarrette Blount (Patriots)	Matt Ryan (Falcons)	Von Miller (Broncos)	Fletcher Cox (Eagles)	Justin Tucker (Ravens)	Dustin Hopkins (Redskins)
4	Ben Roethlisberger (Steelers)	Julio Jones (Falcons)	Zach Brown (Bills)	Aaron Donald (Rams)	Will Fuller (Texans)	Jon Ryan (Seahawks)
5	Tom Brady (Patriots)	David Johnson (Cardinals)	Nickell Robey-Coleman (Bills)	Darius Slay (Lions)	Adam Vinatieri (Colts)	Jamison Crowder (Redskins)
6	Jay Ajayi (Dolphins)	Odell Beckham Jr. (Giants)	Dont'a Hightower (Patriots)	David Irving (Cowboys)	Drew Kaser (Chargers)	Wil Lutz (Saints)
7	Jay Ajayi (Dolphins)	Davante Adams (Packers)	Denzel Perryman (Chargers)	Landon Collins (Giants)	Marquette King (Raiders)	Josh Huff (Eagles)
8	Derek Carr (Raiders)	Jordan Howard (Bears)	Bradley Roby (Broncos)	Star Lotulelei (Panthers)	Shane Lechler (Texans)	Wil Lutz (Saints)
Oct.	Tom Brady (Patriots)	David Johnson (Cardinals)	Lorenzo Alexander (Bills)	Cliff Avril (Seahawks)	Adam Vinatieri (Colts)	Matt Bryant (Falcons)
9	Melvin Gordon (Chargers)	Matt Ryan (Falcons)	Khalil Mack (Raiders)	Landon Collins (Giants)	Jordan Todman (Colts)	Matt Prater (Lions)
10	Marcus Mariota (Titans)	Ezekiel Elliott (Cowboys)	Eric Berry (Chiefs)	Kam Chancellor (Seahawks)	Justin Simmons (Broncos)	Johnny Hekker (Rams)
11	Tom Brady (Patriots)	Kirk Cousins (Redskins)	Stephon Tuitt (Steelers)	Xavier Rhodes (Vikings)	Dan Carpenter (Bills)	Roberto Aguayo (Buccaneers)
12	Tyreek Hill (Chiefs)	Mark Ingram II (Saints)	Khalil Mack (Raiders)	Jason Pierre-Paul (Giants)	Justin Tucker (Ravens)	Matt Prater (Lions)
Nov.	Marcus Mariota (Titans)	Kirk Cousins (Redskins)	Khalil Mack (Raiders)	Landon Collins (Giants)	Cairo Santos (Chiefs)	Matt Prater (Lions)
13	Andrew Luck (Colts)	David Johnson (Cardinals)	Eric Berry (Chiefs)	Akiem Hicks (Bears)	Stephen Gostkowski (Patriots)	Matt Prater (Lions)
14	Le'Veon Bell (Steelers)	Aaron Rodgers (Packers)	Geno Atkins (Bengals)	Vic Beasley (Falcons)	Tyreek Hill (Chiefs)	Brad Wing (Giants)
15	Matt Moore (Dolphins)	Devonta Freeman (Falcons)	Bruce Irvin (Raiders)	Ha Ha Clinton-Dix (Packers)	Ryan Succop (Titans)	Brad Wing (Giants)
16	Jay Ajayi (Dolphins)	Aaron Rodgers (Packers)	Jalen Ramsey (Jaguars)	Malcolm Jenkins (Eagles)	Jamie Meder (Browns)	Matt Bryant (Falcons)
Dec.	Le'Veon Bell (Steelers)	Aaron Rodgers (Packers)	Quintin Demps (Texans)	Vic Beasley (Falcons)	Tyreek Hill (Chiefs)	Johnny Hekker (Rams)
17	Julian Edelman (Patriots)	Matt Ryan (Falcons)	Robert Mathis (Colts)	Dominique Rodgers-Cromartie (Giants)	Tyreek Hill (Chiefs)	Bryan Anger (Buccaneers)

Week	FedEx Air Player of the Week	FedEx Ground Player of the Week	Pepsi Next Rookie of the Week	Castrol Edge Clutch Performer of the Week
1	Jameis Winston (Buccaneers)	DeAngelo Williams (Steelers)	Carson Wentz (Eagles)	Derek Carr (Raiders)
2	Philip Rivers (Chargers)	Matt Forte (Jets)	Corey Coleman (Browns)	Marcus Mariota (Titans)
3	Trevor Siemian (Broncos)	LeSean McCoy (Bills)	Carson Wentz (Eagles)	Su'a Cravens (Redskins)
4	Matt Ryan (Falcons)	Ezekiel Elliott (Cowboys)	Dak Prescott (Cowboys)	Derek Carr (Raiders)
5	Ben Roethlisberger (Steelers)	Ezekiel Elliott (Cowboys)	Carson Wentz (Eagles)	Roberto Aguayo (Buccaneers)
6	Drew Brees (Saints)	Jay Ajayi (Dolphins)	Jatavis Brown (Chargers)	Odell Beckham Jr. (Giants)
7	Aaron Rodgers (Packers)	Jay Ajayi (Dolphins)	Joey Bosa (Chargers)	Denzel Perryman (Chargers)
8	Derek Carr (Raiders)	Jordan Howard (Bears)	Dak Prescott (Cowboys)	Derek Carr (Raiders)
9	Drew Brees (Saints)	Latavius Murray (Raiders)	Dak Prescott (Cowboys)	Melvin Gordon (Chargers)
10	Marcus Mariota (Titans)	DeMarco Murray (Titans)	Ezekiel Elliott (Cowboys)	Ezekiel Elliott (Cowboys)
11	Kirk Cousins (Redskins)	Rob Kelley (Redskins)	Dak Prescott (Cowboys)	Amari Cooper (Raiders)
12	Drew Brees (Saints)	Mark Ingram II (Saints)	Noah Spence (Buccaneers)	Derek Carr (Raiders)
13	Joe Flacco (Ravens)	Latavius Murray (Raiders)	Ezekiel Elliott (Cowboys)	Khalil Mack (Raiders)
14	Aaron Rodgers (Packers)	Le'Veon Bell (Steelers)	Ezekiel Elliott (Cowboys)	Keith Tandy (Buccaneers)
15	Matt Ryan (Falcons)	Devonta Freeman (Falcons)	Ezekiel Elliott (Cowboys)	Sebastian Janikowski (Raiders)
16	Aaron Rodgers (Packers)	Jay Ajayi (Dolphins)	Dak Prescott (Cowboys)	Antonio Brown (Steelers)
17	Matt Ryan (Falcons)	Isaiah Crowell (Browns)	Tyreek Hill (Chiefs)	Mike Evans (Buccaneers)

Month	Rookie of the Month	
Month	Offensive	Defensive
Sept.	Carson Wentz (Eagles)	Deion Jones (Falcons)
Oct.	Ezekiel Elliott (Cowboys)	Joey Bosa (Chargers)
Nov.	Dak Prescott (Cowboys)	Noah Spence (Buccaneers)
Dec.	Jordan Howard (Bears)	Joey Bosa (Chargers)

== Head coach/front office personnel changes ==
=== Head coach ===
==== Offseason ====
Team	Departing coach	Interim coach	Incoming coach	Reason for leaving	Notes
Cleveland Browns	Mike Pettine		Hue Jackson	Fired	Pettine compiled a record of 10–22 (.313) in two years with the Browns, finishing in last place in the AFC North both years. After putting up a promising record of 7–9 the season before, the team, marred by the actions of Johnny Manziel off the field, regressed heavily, forcing the Browns to hire their fifth head coach in eight seasons. The decision to fire Pettine came the day before the end of the regular season. On January 13, the Browns hired Jackson as their head coach. Jackson spent most of the past two seasons as the offensive coordinator for the Cincinnati Bengals and had previously served as head coach for the Oakland Raiders.
Miami Dolphins	Joe Philbin	Dan Campbell	Adam Gase	Fired	Philbin compiled a record of 24–28 (.462), with no playoff appearances, in 3¼ seasons as head coach of the Dolphins. The Dolphins were expected to be contenders for a playoff position in 2015 but grossly underachieved, starting the season 1–3, which led to Philbin's firing. Philbin joined the Indianapolis Colts as offensive line coach for 2016. Campbell, the team's tight ends coach, took over for the rest of the season; following the season, he joined the New Orleans Saints as tight ends coach. On January 9, the Dolphins hired Gase as their head coach. Gase had spent the past season as the offensive coordinator for the Chicago Bears; at age 37, Gase became the youngest active head coach in the NFL.
Philadelphia Eagles	Chip Kelly	Pat Shurmur	Doug Pederson	Fired	Kelly was released on December 29, 2015, one week prior to the end of the regular season, following the Eagles being eliminated from playoff contention. He finished with a record of 26–21 (.553) and one playoff appearance (a single loss in 2013) over almost three seasons. Heading into 2015, Kelly made several controversial roster moves as general manager that didn't pan out, leading to his firing. Offensive Coordinator (and former Cleveland Browns head coach) Pat Shurmur served as interim replacement for week 17. Shurmur finished 1–0 as the Eagles head coach, and was a frontrunner in the Eagles head coaching race along with Tom Coughlin and Doug Pederson; following the season, he joined the Minnesota Vikings as tight ends coach and later offensive coordinator after the sudden resignation of Norv Turner. On January 18, the Eagles hired Pederson as their head coach. Pederson had spent the previous three season as offensive coordinator for the Kansas City Chiefs, and also was a former QB for the Eagles.
San Francisco 49ers	Jim Tomsula		Chip Kelly	Fired	Tomsula compiled a record of 5–11 (.313) in his lone full season as head coach of the 49ers. On January 14, the 49ers hired Kelly as their head coach. Kelly had spent the previous three seasons as head coach for the Philadelphia Eagles.
Tampa Bay Buccaneers	Lovie Smith		Dirk Koetter	Fired	Smith compiled a record of 8–24 (.250), with no playoff appearances, in two years with the Buccaneers, finishing in last place in the NFC South both years. Smith moved to the college ranks, becoming the head coach of the university of Illinois Fighting Illini football team. On January 14, Koetter was promoted to head coach after serving as offensive coordinator with the team since 2015.
Tennessee Titans	Ken Whisenhunt	Mike Mularkey		Fired	Whisenhunt compiled a record of 3–20 (.130), with no playoff appearances, in 1½ seasons as head coach of the Titans. After an impressive opening day win, the Titans lost six straight, resulting in Whisenhunt's dismissal. Mularkey, the team's tight ends coach, took over as interim head coach. Mularkey's previous head coaching experience includes two seasons with the Buffalo Bills (2004–05) and one season with the Jacksonville Jaguars (2012). For 2016, Whisenhunt joined the San Diego Chargers as offensive coordinator. On January 16, Mularkey shed the interim tag and was hired as the full-time head coach.
New York Giants	Tom Coughlin		Ben McAdoo	Resigned	Coughlin compiled a record of 102–90 (.531) in 12 years with the Giants, a tenure that included three division titles, five playoff appearances (with a collective record of 8–3 in those games), and two Super Bowl wins (Super Bowl XLII and Super Bowl XLVI, both over the New England Patriots). Since winning Super Bowl XLVI, the Giants had missed the playoffs every year and had accrued three consecutive losing seasons immediately prior to Coughlin's resignation. On January 14, McAdoo was promoted to head coach after serving as offensive coordinator with the team since 2014.

==== In-season ====
Team	2016 head coach	Reason for leaving	Interim replacement	Notes
Los Angeles Rams	Jeff Fisher	Fired	John Fassel	After receiving a two-year contract extension prior to the season, Fisher was fired after going 4–9 in the season, and 31–45–1 (.414) in his tenure in St. Louis and Los Angeles. Under his tenure, the Rams never finished better than 7–8–1 (2012) and never reached the playoffs. Fassel, the son of former NFL head coach Jim Fassel, has been the Rams' special teams coach since 2012.
Jacksonville Jaguars	Gus Bradley	Fired	Doug Marrone	Bradley was fired after four seasons and a 14–48 (.226) record with no playoff appearances. Marrone, the Jaguars' offensive line coach, was previously head coach of the Buffalo Bills from 2013 to 2014.
Buffalo Bills	Rex Ryan	Fired	Anthony Lynn	Ryan was fired after two seasons and a 15–16 record with no playoff appearances. His twin brother, assistant head coach Rob Ryan, also was dismissed. Lynn began the 2016 season as running backs coach, then moved up to offensive coordinator when Greg Roman was fired in week 3, then interim head coach after Ryan's dismissal.

=== Front office ===
==== Offseason ====
Team	Position	2015 office holder	2015 interim	2016 replacement	Reason for leaving	Notes
Cleveland Browns	GM	Ray Farmer		Sashi Brown	Fired	The Browns released Ray Farmer after the final game of the 2015 regular season. He had been with the team for three seasons, two as general manager. As of April 2016, the Browns had not named a general manager; the duties are being filled in the interim by executive vice president of football operations Sashi Brown, an attorney by trade who has served in the Browns front office since 2013.
Detroit Lions	GM	Martin Mayhew	Sheldon White	Bob Quinn	Fired	After starting the season 1–6, the Lions fired offensive coordinator Joe Lombardi. One week later, after another loss to the Kansas City Chiefs, owner Martha Firestone Ford fired Mayhew and Lewand. On January 8, the Lions hired Quinn as their GM. Quinn had spent the previous 16 seasons in various positions in the front office of the New England Patriots.
Detroit Lions	Team President	Tom Lewand	Rod Wood		Fired	After starting the season 1–6, the Lions fired offensive coordinator Joe Lombardi. One week later, after another loss to the Kansas City Chiefs, owner Martha Firestone Ford fired Mayhew and Lewand. On January 8, the Lions hired Quinn as their GM. Quinn had spent the previous 16 seasons in various positions in the front office of the New England Patriots.
Miami Dolphins	GM	Dennis Hickey		Chris Grier	Fired	The Dolphins fired GM Hickey, who had spent the past two years with the team. Grier, Dolphins' director of college scouting, was appointed as the new GM on January 5, 2016, having worked for the Dolphins organization since 2000. Grier formerly worked in the New England Patriots front office from 1994 to 1999.
Philadelphia Eagles	VP of Player Personnel	Ed Marynowitz	Tom Donahoe		Fired	Vice President of Player Personnel Ed Marynowitz was fired alongside head coach Chip Kelly on December 29, 2015. Donahoe last served as president and general manager of the Buffalo Bills from 2001 to 2005 but has largely been out of football in the ten years since his firing from that position.
Philadelphia Eagles	GM (de facto)	Chip Kelly	Howie Roseman		Fired	Roseman, who carried the title of "executive vice president of football operations" while Kelly handled general manager duties in 2015, reverted to his previous general manager duties after Kelly's firing.
Tennessee Titans	GM	Ruston Webster		Jon Robinson	Fired	The Titans released Webster the Monday following their final game of the 2015 regular season. Webster had spent the past four seasons with the team. On January 14, the Titans hired Robinson as GM. Robinson had spent the previous three seasons as director of player personnel for the Tampa Bay Buccaneers.

== Stadiums ==
=== Atlanta Falcons ===
The Atlanta Falcons played their 25th and final season at the Georgia Dome, with the team's new home field, Mercedes-Benz Stadium, opened in 2017.

=== Minnesota Vikings ===
The Minnesota Vikings played their first season at U.S. Bank Stadium in downtown Minneapolis. Construction on the team's new home field in downtown Minneapolis wrapped up at the start of the 2016 season. The new stadium was built on the site of the Vikings' former home, the Hubert H. Humphrey Metrodome, which was demolished after the 2013 season.

=== Relocation of the Rams from St. Louis to Los Angeles ===
The league scheduled a vote on whether to relocate one or two of its existing franchises to the Los Angeles metropolitan area on January 12, 2016. The league set a relocation fee of $550 million for any team that was approved to relocate. On January 4, three teams filed to relocate to Los Angeles: the Oakland Raiders, San Diego Chargers, and the St. Louis Rams, all three of which had previously resided in the city at various points in their history. Despite the Committee on Los Angeles Opportunities recommending the Raiders' and Chargers' joint proposal for a stadium in Carson, California, on January 12, the league approved the Rams' proposal to relocate to Inglewood after three ballots and gave the Chargers the option to share the Rams' stadium if they so chose. In the first two rounds of voting, Inglewood led Carson 21–11 and 20–12 respectively; by the third ballot, the Rams proposal had received effectively unanimous support from the other owners, with the final vote reaching 30–2 (the Raiders and Chargers themselves casting the lone opposing votes). The Rams played the first four seasons at the Los Angeles Memorial Coliseum, while their new stadium was built in Inglewood. The Rams had previously played at the Coliseum during their first stint in Los Angeles from 1946 to 1979.

==== Rams bid for Los Angeles ====
The Rams and the St. Louis CVC (Convention & Visitors Commission) began negotiating deals to get the Rams' home stadium, The Dome at America's Center (then known as Edward Jones Dome), into the top 25 percent of stadiums in the league (i.e., top eight teams of the thirty-two NFL teams in reference to luxury boxes, amenities and overall fan experience). Under the terms of the lease agreement, the St. Louis CVC was required to make modifications to the Edward Jones Dome in 2005. However, then-owner, Georgia Frontiere, waived the provision in exchange for cash that served as a penalty for the city's noncompliance. The City of St. Louis, in subsequent years, made changes to the score board and increased the natural lighting by replacing panels with windows, although the overall feel remained dark. The minor renovations which totaled about $70 million did not bring the stadium within the specifications required under the lease agreement.

On February 1, 2013, a three-person arbitral tribunal selected to preside over the arbitration process found that the Edward Jones Dome was not in the top 25% of all NFL venues as required under the terms of the lease agreement between the Rams and the CVC. The tribunal further found that the estimated $700 million in proposed renovations by the Rams was not unreasonable given the terms of the lease agreement. Finally, the city of St. Louis was ordered to pay the Rams attorneys' fees which totaled a reported $2 million.

Publicly, city, county and state officials expressed no interest in providing further funding to the Edward Jones Dome in light of those entities, as well as taxpayers, continuing to owe approximately $300 million more on that facility. As such, if a resolution was not reached by the end of the 2014–2015 NFL season and the City of St. Louis remained non-compliant in its obligations under the lease agreement, the Rams were free to nullify their lease and relocate.

On January 31, 2014, both the Los Angeles Times and the St. Louis Post-Dispatch reported that Rams owner Stan Kroenke had purchased 60 acres of land adjacent to the Forum in Inglewood, California. It was, by the most conservative estimates, sufficient land on which an NFL-sized stadium may be constructed. The purchase price was rumored to have been between US$90–100 million. Commissioner Roger Goodell represented that Kroenke informed the league of the purchase. As an NFL owner, any purchase of land in which a potential stadium could be built must be disclosed to the league. This development further fueled rumors that the Rams intended to return its management and football operations to Southern California. The land was initially targeted for a Walmart Supercenter but Walmart could not get the necessary permits to build the center. Kroenke is married to Ann Walton Kroenke who is a member of the Walton family and many of Kroenke's real estate deals have involved Walmart properties. On January 5, 2015, The Los Angeles Times reported that Kroenke Sports & Entertainment and Stockbridge Capital Group were partnering up to develop a new NFL stadium on property owned by Kroenke. The project included a stadium of up to 80,000 seats and a performance venue of 6,000 seats while reconfiguring the previously approved Hollywood Park plan for up to 890,000 square feet of retail, 780,000 square feet of office space, 2,500 new residential units, a 300-room hotel and 25 acres of public parks, playgrounds, open space and pedestrian and bicycle access. In lieu of this the city of St. Louis responded on January 9, 2015, by unveiling an outdoor, open air, riverfront stadium that could have accommodated the Rams and an MLS team with the hope that the NFL bylaws would force them to stay. On February 24, 2015, the Inglewood City Council approved the stadium and the initiative with construction on the stadium planned to begin in December 2015. On December 21, 2015, Construction was officially underway at the Hollywood Park site for the stadium. On January 4, 2016, after St. Louis finished last in per-game attendance for the 2015 season, the team filed a relocation application to relocate to Los Angeles and released a statement on their website.

On January 12, 2016, the NFL owners approved the Inglewood proposal and the Rams' relocation by a 30–2 vote; the Rams relocated almost immediately thereafter.

==== Raiders and Chargers failed stadium bid ====
On February 19, 2015, the Oakland Raiders and San Diego Chargers announced plans for a privately financed $1.7 billion stadium that the two teams would build in Carson, California if they were to move to the Los Angeles market. Such a move would have marked a return to the nation's second-largest market for both teams; the Raiders played in Los Angeles from 1982 to 1994 while the Chargers called Los Angeles home for their inaugural season in the American Football League. The Chargers were the only NFL team to play in Southern California at the time (until the Rams moved to Los Angeles in 2016), with San Diego being a 125-mile (201 km) distance from Los Angeles, and the Chargers counted Los Angeles as a secondary market. The Chargers had been looking to replace Qualcomm Stadium (which, like the Oakland Coliseum opened in the late 1960s) since at least 2003, and had an annual out clause in which it could move in exchange for paying a fine to the city of San Diego for its remaining years on its lease. The Raiders, meanwhile, had been operating on year-to-year leases with Oakland Coliseum, the stadium it has shared with the Oakland Athletics for most of its time in Oakland, California, since the last long-term lease on that stadium ended in 2013.

Due to both television contracts and NFL bylaws, had both of the longstanding division rivals moved to Los Angeles, one of the teams would have been required to move to the NFC West, something that Mark Davis volunteered the Raiders to be willing to do. The Raiders moving to the National Football Conference would have been considered ironic seeing that Davis's father Al Davis was a staunch opponent of the NFL during its rivalry and eventual merger with the AFL. If such a scenario had happened, a NFC West team would have had to take their spot in the AFC West. The early rumor was that the Seattle Seahawks, who played in the AFC West from 1977 to 2001, would have been the favorite to have switched conferences with the Raiders. However, that team's then growing rivalry with the San Francisco 49ers had pointed to either the Arizona Cardinals or the then-St. Louis Rams switching conferences to take the Raiders' spot in the AFC West. Had the Rams stayed in St. Louis, switching them to the AFC would have allowed for a yearly home-and-home with the cross-state Kansas City Chiefs. As a portion of the Rams' 2016 schedule was already set because of their International Series appearance, the league could not realign until at least 2017.

On October 23, 2015, Mark Fabiani, Chargers spokesperson confirmed that the team planned to officially notify the NFL about its intentions to relocate to Los Angeles in January during the timetable when teams can request to relocate. On January 4, 2016, both teams filed relocation applications for relocation to Los Angeles. On January 12, 2016, the NFL voted to allow the Rams move to Los Angeles and the Inglewood proposal, effectively rejecting and killing the Carson proposal. The Chargers were then given the option to join the Rams in Inglewood in 2017, with the Raiders having the option in 2018 if the Chargers declined; the Chargers announced on January 29 that they would remain in San Diego for the 2016 season as negotiations continued, but that if negotiations ultimately failed, they had reached an agreement in principle with the Rams to join them in Los Angeles once the Inglewood stadium was complete. The Raiders reached an agreement on another one-year lease extension with Oakland Coliseum on February 11, 2016, keeping the team in Oakland for one more season.

The Raiders, having previously explored San Antonio, Texas as a potential relocation site in 2014, moved on to other potential relocation sites after the rejection of the Carson proposal, focusing on a stadium plan in the vicinity of Las Vegas, Nevada. On August 25, 2016, the Raiders applied for a trademark for the "Las Vegas Raiders" and unveiled artist renditions of the proposed Las Vegas stadium, given the tentative title "Raiders Stadium".

=== Naming rights agreements ===
==== Buffalo Bills ====
On August 13, the Buffalo Bills and Pegula Sports and Entertainment reached an agreement to sell the naming rights to their stadium to the locally based New Era Cap Company, a major headwear supplier to all of the major North American sports leagues. The stadium had previously been known as Rich Stadium from its opening in 1973, then as Ralph Wilson Stadium since 1998. The sale of naming rights came as somewhat of a surprise, as previous owner Ralph Wilson was firmly against selling the naming rights to the stadium and there were few companies in Western New York believed to have the money to pay the naming rights fee for an NFL stadium.

==== Miami Dolphins ====
Canadian-based financial services company Sun Life Financial had held the naming rights to the Miami Dolphins' stadium since 2010, a deal which expired in the offseason. The team already announced that it was not going to renew the license. On August 16, 2016, it was reported that Hard Rock Cafe purchased the naming rights to the stadium, with the venue to be renamed Hard Rock Stadium.

==== Oakland Raiders ====
On April 2, the O.co Coliseum, home of the Oakland Raiders, reverted to its previous identity as the Oakland Alameda Coliseum. Online retailer Overstock.com held the naming rights to the Raiders' home field since 2011, but opted out of the naming rights agreement, though it will continue to maintain its corporate sponsorship with the Athletics. The Raiders' home field has undergone numerous name changes in its history, including Network Associates Coliseum (1998–2004) and McAfee Coliseum (2004–2008).

=== Field surface changes ===
==== Baltimore Ravens ====
On December 2, 2015, the Baltimore Ravens announced a change in the surface at M&T Bank Stadium from their previous Shaw Sportexe Momentum 51 artificial turf to natural Bermuda grass for the first time since the 2001 season, by player preference for a natural surface. The field was replaced beginning on February 4, 2016, timed to be installed by the start of the Johns Hopkins lacrosse season.

== New uniforms and patches ==
After a trial run in 2015, the NFL Color Rush program returned for 2016 with all 32 NFL teams required to participate. To prevent issues with color blindness from the previous season, the NFL is scheduled match-ups and where color blindness would not be an issue. The Color Rush games were during the Thursday Night Football contests.

- The San Francisco 49ers wore a patch to commemorate their 70th season.
- The New Orleans Saints wore a patch to commemorate their 50th season.
- The New York Giants wore white pants instead of gray for their primary home jerseys.
- The Los Angeles Rams joined the handful of teams (such as the Cowboys and the Dolphins) that primarily wear their white jerseys at home. The change comes as a nod to the team's Fearsome Foursome era (they will play in the same stadium as those teams) and to accommodate the warmer climate of Los Angeles. The uniform itself will remain the same as it was in the last years in St. Louis.
- The Miami Dolphins wore aqua for some of their home games in 2016 that include daytime.
- The Pittsburgh Steelers retired their 1934 throwback uniforms after the 2016 season. The Steelers wore them for the last time on October 9, 2016, against the New York Jets.
- The Atlanta Falcons wore 1966 throwback uniforms against the San Diego Chargers and San Francisco 49ers. The throwback uniforms are an altered version of the ones used from 2009 to 2012.
- The Washington Redskins wore burgundy pants with their white jerseys for the first time in five years, and temporarily place gray facemasks on their helmets when wearing the 1937 throwback uniforms.

== Media ==
=== Broadcast rights ===
This was the third season under the league's broadcast contracts with its television partners. This included "cross-flexing" (switching) Sunday afternoon games between CBS and Fox before or during the season, regardless of whether the visiting team is in the AFC (which CBS normally airs) or the NFC (which is normally carried by Fox). NBC continued to air Sunday Night Football, the annual Kickoff game, and the primetime Thanksgiving game. ESPN continued airing Monday Night Football and the Pro Bowl. During the postseason, ABC simulcasted one AFC Wild Card game with ESPN. One NFC Wild Card game was broadcast on NBC. Coverage of the AFC playoff games was split between CBS and NBC, while the remainder of the NFC playoff games was broadcast by Fox. CBS had exclusive coverage of the AFC Championship Game. Fox had exclusive coverage of the NFC Championship Game and Super Bowl LI, and it was also on Fox Deportes.

=== Flexible scheduling ===
A change to the flexible scheduling rule takes effect for the 2016 season: in week 17, any game can be flexed into Sunday Night Football, regardless of how many times a team had been featured on a primetime game that season. This change can, theoretically, allow a game with playoff implications in the final week of the season to be moved to primetime for greater prominence. As in 2015, the NFL will continue the "suspension" of its blackout policy, meaning that all games will be broadcast in their home markets regardless of ticket sales; Goodell stated that the league needed to continue investigating the impact of removing the blackout rules before such a change is made permanent.

=== Thursday Night Football ===
The league's contract with CBS for Thursday Night Football expired after the 2015 season and was placed back up for bids. On February 1, 2016, the NFL announced that Thursday Night Football would be shared between CBS, NBC, and NFL Network for the 2016 season. CBS and NBC will each air five games, which will be simulcast by NFL Network, along with an additional eight games exclusively on NFL Network, the production of which will be split between the two networks. Commissioner Roger Goodell that the league was "thrilled to add NBC to the Thursday Night Football mix, a trusted partner with a proven track record of success broadcasting NFL football in primetime, and look forward to expanding with a digital partner for what will be a unique tri-cast on broadcast, cable and digital platforms." On April 5, 2016, it was announced that Twitter had acquired non-exclusive worldwide digital streaming rights to the 10 broadcast television TNF games, including to mobile devices (this is the first time any NFL games have been made available to mobile devices not subscribed to Verizon Wireless, whose NFL Mobile app holds exclusive rights to all other games). This partnership will also include content for Twitter's live streaming service Periscope, such as behind-the-scenes access.

=== Internet streaming for International Series ===
After 2015's Bills–Jaguars International Series contest was a modest success, the league was initially expected to make all three of the 2016 London games exclusive to the Internet. Yahoo! Screen, which carried the 2015 contest, shut down in January 2016; the bidders on the three games (which may or may not go to the same broadcaster) included YouTube and Apple TV, both of which bid on the 2015 game but were passed up in favor of Yahoo!'s bid. Ultimately, the league decided not to make the International Series games Web-exclusive, instead focusing its efforts on the Thursday Night Football partnership with Twitter.

=== Personnel changes ===
Mike Tirico, the lead play-by-play announcer for Monday Night Football, announced his departure from ESPN on May 9, 2016; he joins NBC, where he was originally designated to lead the network's broadcast team for Thursday Night Football telecasts. Replacing Tirico on MNF is Sean McDonough. The move was initially reported in April but not confirmed until the next month. However, shortly before the start of the regular season, the league exercised a clause in its television contract with NBC demanding that any broadcast team that calls Sunday Night Football also call Thursday Night Football as well, effectively forcing Al Michaels to call both packages unless he and Tirico also split Sundays (this was the scenario that was ultimately chosen; on most weeks when Michaels calls a Thursday game, Tirico will call Sundays). Tirico eventually got his chance the next season, when NBC announced he would replace Michaels after the NFL waived its broadcast team clause.

Tirico's colleague at ESPN, Heather Cox, was also hired by NBC as their sideline reporter for Thursday Night Football, after Michele Tafoya opted out to spend more time with family, and to focus on SNF.

This is also the final season Chris Berman serves as a studio analyst for ESPN's NFL programming; Berman has been with ESPN since the network's inception in 1979.

This would also end up being Phil Simms' last season as lead color commentator for the NFL on CBS. Tony Romo, who would retire at the end of this season, would replace Simms as lead color commentator on CBS. Simms will join The NFL Today next season.

This would also lead to Tony Gonzalez and Bart Scott, leaving The NFL Today. Gonzalez will now be on Fox NFL Kickoff. Replacing Gonzalez and Scott will be Simms and Nate Burleson, who comes over from NFL Network's football morning talk show, Good Morning Football, although he will remain with the show.

This would also be the last season for Solomon Wilcots at CBS. James Lofton from Westwood One, will replace Wilcots next season.

Meanwhile, at Fox, this would be the last season for John Lynch, who would leave to be the next general manager of the San Francisco 49ers. Replacing Lynch next season, would be Charles Davis who would move up from the #4 team at Fox to join Kevin Burkhardt.

== Television viewers and ratings ==
=== Most watched regular season games ===
- DH = doubleheader; SNF = NBC Sunday Night Football

Rank	Date	Matchup				Network	Viewers (millions)	TV rating	Window	Significance
1	November 24, 4:30 ET	Washington Redskins	26	Dallas Cowboys	31	Fox	35.1	14.5	Thanksgiving	Cowboys–Redskins rivalry
2	November 13, 4:25 ET	Dallas Cowboys	35	Pittsburgh Steelers	30	Fox	28.9	16.4	Late DH^{[a]}	Cowboys–Steelers rivalry
3	October 16, 4:25 ET	Dallas Cowboys	30	Green Bay Packers	16	Fox	28.0	15.8	Late DH^{[b]}	Cowboys-Packers rivalry
4	November 24, 12:30 ET	Minnesota Vikings	13	Detroit Lions	16	CBS	27.6	13.0	Thanksgiving	Lions–Vikings rivalry
5	September 11, 4:25 ET	New York Giants	20	Dallas Cowboys	19	Fox	27.5	15.5	Late DH^{[c]}	Cowboys–Giants rivalry
6	December 11, 8:30 ET	Dallas Cowboys	7	New York Giants	10	NBC	26.5	14.9	SNF	Cowboys–Giants rivalry
7	December 4, 4:25 ET	New York Giants	14	Pittsburgh Steelers	24	Fox	25.4	14.6	Late DH^{[d]}	
8	September 8, 8:30 ET	Carolina Panthers	20	Denver Broncos	21	NBC	25.2	14.6	Kickoff Game	Super Bowl 50 Rematch
9	December 11, 4:25 ET	Seattle Seahawks	10	Green Bay Packers	38	Fox	25.2	14.4	Late DH^{[e]}	Packers–Seahawks rivalry
10	December 18, 4:25 ET	New England Patriots	16	Denver Broncos	3	CBS	25.0	14.2	Late DH^{[f]}	AFC Championship Rematch

*Note – Late DH matchups listed in table are the matchups that were shown to the largest percentage of the market.

1. DAL/PIT was shown in 92% of the markets during the late doubleheader time slot of Fox coverage.
2. DAL/GB was shown in 86% of the markets during the late doubleheader time slot of Fox coverage.
3. NYG/DAL was shown in 90% of the markets during the late doubleheader time slot of Fox coverage.
4. NYG/PIT was shown in 85% of the markets during the late doubleheader time slot of Fox coverage.
5. SEA/GB was shown in 67% of the markets during the late doubleheader time slot of Fox coverage.
6. NE/DEN was shown in 83% of the markets during the late doubleheader time slot of CBS coverage.
