= List of Pro Bowl players, L–M =

The following is a list of players, both past and current, who have been selected to play in the NFL's annual Pro Bowl game, beginning with the 1950 season.

Between 1938 and 1942, an NFL all star team played the league champion in the NFL All-Star Game. Participants in these games are not recognized by the NFL as Pro Bowlers, and they are not included in this list. No games were played between 1943 and 1950.

Between 1961 and 1969, the NFL and AFL played separate all-star games. This list includes players who were selected to play in the American Football League All-Star game during that period.

== L ==
†—Named as a starter ‡—Did not participate (see notes) #—Named Pro Bowl MVP/co-MVP (or equivalent)

Name	Position	Year(s) selected	Franchise(s) represented	Notes
Jim Lachey	OT	1987, 1990, 1991	San Diego Chargers (1987); Washington Redskins (1990, 1991)	
Eddie Lacy	RB	2013	Green Bay Packers	2013—Selected as a replacement for Adrian Peterson
Ernie Ladd	DT	1962 (AFL), 1963 (AFL), 1964 (AFL), 1965 (AFL)	San Diego Chargers	
L. P. Ladouceur	LS	2014	Dallas Cowboys	
Warren Lahr	DB	1953	Cleveland Browns	
Bruce Laird	KR	1972	Baltimore Colts	
Carnell Lake	S	1994, 1995, 1996, 1997, 1999	Pittsburgh Steelers (1994–1997); Jacksonville Jaguars (1999)	
CeeDee Lamb	WR	2021, 2022	Dallas Cowboys	2021—Selected as a replacement for Cooper Kupp
Jack Lambert	MLB	1975, 1976, 1977, 1978 1979, 1980, 1981, 1982, 1983	Pittsburgh Steelers	
Pete Lammons	TE	1967 (AFL)	New York Jets	
Daryle Lamonica	QB	1965 (AFL), 1967 (AFL), 1969 (AFL), 1970, 1972	Buffalo Bills (1965); Oakland Raiders (1967, 1969, 1970, 1972)	
Sean Landeta	P	1986, 1990	New York Giants	
Greg Landry	QB	1971	Detroit Lions	
Harold Landry	OLB	2021	Tennessee Titans	2021—Selected as a replacement for Joey Bosa
Jarvis Landry	WR	2015, 2016†, 2017, 2018, 2019	Miami Dolphins (2015–2017); Cleveland Browns (2018, 2019)	2016—Selected as a replacement for Antonio Brown; 2017—Selected as a replacement for DeAndre Hopkins; 2018—Selected as a replacement for DeAndre Hopkins
LaRon Landry	S	2012	New York Jets	
Tom Landry	DB	1954	New York Giants	
MacArthur Lane	RB	1970	St. Louis Cardinals	
Night Train Lane	DB	1954, 1955, 1956, 1958, 1960, 1961 (NFL), 1962 (NFL)	Chicago Cardinals (1954–1956, 1958); Detroit Lions (1960–1962)	
T. J. Lang	G	2016, 2017	Green Bay Packers (2016); Detroit Lions (2017)	2017—Selected as a replacement for Brandon Scherff
Jim Langer	C	1973, 1974, 1975, 1976, 1977, 1978	Miami Dolphins	
Willie Lanier	MLB	1968 (AFL), 1969 (AFL), 1970, 1971, 1972, 1973, 1974, 1975	Kansas City Chiefs	
Buck Lansford	OT	1956	Philadelphia Eagles	
Steve Largent	WR	1978, 1979, 1981, 1984, 1985, 1986, 1987	Seattle Seahawks	
Gary Larsen	DT	1969 (NFL), 1970	Minnesota Vikings	
Greg Larson	C	1968 (NFL)	New York Giants	
Yale Lary	DB, P	1953, 1956, 1957, 1958, 1959, 1960, 1961 (NFL), 1962 (NFL) 1964 (NFL)	Detroit Lions	
Bill Laskey	LB	1965 (AFL)	Buffalo Bills	
Ike Lassiter	DE	1966 (AFL)	Oakland Raiders	
Lamar Lathon	OLB	1996	Carolina Panthers	
Marshon Lattimore	CB	2017, 2019†‡, 2020, 2021	New Orleans Saints	2019—Did not play in the Pro Bowl due to injury
Johnny Lattner	KR	1954	Pittsburgh Steelers	
Dante Lavelli	OE	1951, 1953,	Cleveland Browns	
Joe Lavender	CB	1979, 1980	Washington Redskins	
Ty Law	CB	1998#, 2001, 2002, 2003, 2005	New England Patriots (1998, 2001–2003); New York Jets (2005)	1998—Named MVP of game
DeMarcus Lawrence	DE	2017†, 2018†, 2022	Dallas Cowboys	
Dexter Lawrence	DT	2022	New York Giants	
Henry Lawrence	OT	1983, 1984	Los Angeles Raiders	
Rolland Lawrence	CB	1977	Atlanta Falcons	
Bobby Layne	QB	1951, 1952, 1953, 1956, 1958, 1959	Detroit Lions (1951–1953, 1956); Pittsburgh Steelers (1958, 1959)	
Vonta Leach	FB	2010, 2011, 2012	Houston Texans (2010); Baltimore Ravens (2011, 2012)	2012–Did not play in the Pro Bowl because the Ravens advanced to Super Bowl XLVII
Eddie LeBaron	QB	1955, 1957, 1958, 1962	Washington Redskins (1955, 1957, 1958); Dallas Cowboys (1962)	
Dick LeBeau	DB	1964 (NFL) 1965 (NFL), 1966 (NFL)	Detroit Lions	
Shane Lechler	P	2001, 2004, 2007, 2008, 2009, 2010, 2011	Oakland Raiders	
Jim LeClair	LB	1976	Cincinnati Bengals	
Andy Lee	P	2007, 2009, 2011	San Francisco 49ers	
Carl Lee	CB	1988, 1989, 1990	Minnesota Vikings	
Sean Lee	LB	2015, 2016	Dallas Cowboys	
Frank LeMaster	LB	1981	Philadelphia Eagles	
Ray Lemek	RT	1961	Washington Redskins	
Charles Leno	OT	2018	Chicago Bears	2018—Selected as a replacement for Terron Armstead
Chuck Leo	G	1961 (AFL)	Boston Patriots	
Shaquille Leonard	ILB	2019†, 2020†, 2021†	Indianapolis Colts	
Leon Lett	DT	1994, 1998	Dallas Cowboys	
Dorsey Levens	RB	1997	Green Bay Packers	
Jerry LeVias	WR	1969 (AFL)	Houston Oilers	
Taylor Lewan	OT	2016†, 2017†, 2018†	Tennessee Titans	
Albert Lewis	CB	1987, 1988, 1989, 1990	Kansas City Chiefs	
Chad Lewis	TE	2000, 2001, 2002	Philadelphia Eagles	
Darryll Lewis	CB	1995	Houston Oilers	
Dave Lewis	LB	1980	Tampa Bay Buccaneers	
Frank Lewis	WR	1981	Buffalo Bills	
Jamal Lewis	RB	2003	Baltimore Ravens	
Jermaine Lewis	WR, RS	1998, 2001	Baltimore Ravens	
Marcedes Lewis	TE	2010	Jacksonville Jaguars	
Michael Lewis	S	2004	Philadelphia Eagles	
Michael Lewis	KR	2002	New Orleans Saints	
Mo Lewis	LB	1998, 1999, 2000	New York Jets	
Ray Lewis	LB	1997, 1998, 1999, 2000, 2001, 2003, 2004, 2006, 2007, 2008, 2009†, 2010†, 2011†	Baltimore Ravens	
Woodley Lewis	DB	1950	Los Angeles Rams	
Matt Light	OT	2006, 2007†, 2010	New England Patriots	2006—Selected as a replacement for Jonathan Ogden
Bob Lilly	DE, DT	1962 (NFL), 1964 (NFL), 1965 (NFL), 1966 (NFL), 1967 (NFL), 1968 (NFL), 1969 (NFL), 1970, 1971, 1972, 1973	Dallas Cowboys	
Keith Lincoln	FB, HB	1962 (AFL), 1963 (AFL), 1964 (AFL), 1965 (AFL), 1967 (AFL)	San Diego Chargers (1962–1965); Buffalo Bills (1967)	
Phillip Lindsay	RB	2018‡	Denver Broncos	2018—Did not play in the Pro Bowl due to injury
Chris Lindstrom	G	2022	Atlanta Falcons	
Toni Linhart	K	1976, 1977	Baltimore Colts	
Corey Linsley	C	2021†	Los Angeles Chargers	
Louis Lipps	KR, WR	1984, 1985	Pittsburgh Steelers	
Gene Lipscomb	DT	1958, 1959#, 1962 (NFL)#	Baltimore Colts (1958, 1959); Pittsburgh Steelers (1962)	1959—Named Outstanding Lineman of game 1962—Named Outstanding Lineman of game
Paul Lipscomb	DT	1950, 1951, 1952, 1953	Washington Redskins	
David Little	ILB	1990	Pittsburgh Steelers	
Floyd Little	RB	1968 (AFL), 1969 (AFL), 1970, 1971, 1973	Denver Broncos	
Larry Little	G	1969 (AFL), 1971, 1972, 1973 1974	Miami Dolphins	
Leonard Little	DE	2003	St. Louis Rams	
Cory Littleton	ST	2018†‡	Los Angeles Rams	2018—Did not play in the Pro Bowl because the Rams advanced to Super Bowl LIII
Andy Livingston	RB	1969	New Orleans Saints	
Mike Livingston	QB	1969 (AFL)	Kansas City Chiefs	
Brandon Lloyd	WR	2010	Denver Broncos	
Dave Lloyd	LB	1969	Philadelphia Eagles	
Greg Lloyd	LB	1991, 1992, 1993, 1994, 1995	Pittsburgh Steelers	
Tyler Lockett	WR	2015	Seattle Seahawks	
Carl "Spider" Lockhart	DB	1966, 1968	New York Giants	
James Lofton	WR	1978, 1980, 1981, 1982, 1983, 1984, 1985, 1991	Green Bay Packers (1978, 1980–1985); Buffalo Bills (1991)	
Jerry Logan	S	1965 (NFL), 1970, 1971	Baltimore Colts	
Chip Lohmiller	PK	1991	Washington Redskins	
Neil Lomax	QB	1984, 1987,	St. Louis Cardinals	
Charlie Long	OT, G	1962 (AFL), 1963 (AFL)	Boston Patriots	
Howie Long	DE	1983, 1984, 1985, 1986, 1987, 1989, 1992, 1993	Los Angeles Raiders	
Jake Long	OT	2008, 2009, 2010, 2011	Miami Dolphins	2008—Selected as a replacement for Jason Peters; 2009—Did not play in the Pro Bowl due to injury 2010—Did not play in the Pro Bowl due to injury 2011—Did not play in the Pro Bowl due to injury
Kyle Long	G	2013, 2014, 2015	Chicago Bears	
Ronnie Lott	CB, S	1981, 1982, 1983, 1984, 1986, 1987, 1988, 1989, 1990, 1991	San Francisco 49ers (1981–1984, 1986–1990); Los Angeles Raiders (1991)	
Duval Love	LG	1994	Pittsburgh Steelers	
Paul Lowe	HB	1963 (AFL), 1965 (AFL)	San Diego Chargers	
Rick Lovato	LS	2019†	Philadelphia Eagles	
John LoVetere	DT	1963 (NFL)	New York Giants	
Nick Lowery	K	1981, 1990, 1992	Kansas City Chiefs	
Mike Lucci	MLB	1971	Detroit Lions	
Andrew Luck	QB	2012, 2013, 2014, 2018	Indianapolis Colts	2012—Selected as a replacement for Tom Brady; 2013—Selected as a replacement for Russell Wilson; 2018—Selected as a replacement for Philip Rivers
Johnny Lujack	QB	1950, 1951	Chicago Bears	
Lamar Lundy	DE	1959	Los Angeles Rams	
Wil Lutz	K	2019†	New Orleans Saints	
Todd Lyght	CB	1999	St. Louis Rams	
Lenny Lyles	DB	1966 (NFL)	Baltimore Colts	
Dick Lynch	DB	1963 (NFL)	New York Giants	
Jim Lynch	LB	1968 (AFL)	Kansas City Chiefs	
John Lynch	S	1997, 1999, 2000, 2001, 2002, 2004, 2005, 2006, 2007	Tampa Bay Buccaneers (1997, 1999–2002); Denver Broncos (2004–2007)	2007—Selected as a replacement for Bob Sanders
Marshawn Lynch	RB	2008, 2011, 2012, 2013‡, 2014	Buffalo Bills (2008); Seattle Seahawks (2011–2014)	2008—Selected as a replacement for Chris Johnson; 2011—Selected as a replacement for Frank Gore; 2013—Did not play in the Pro Bowl because the Seahawks advanced to Super Bowl XLVIII; 2014—Did not play in the Pro Bowl because the Seahawks advanced to Super Bowl XLIX

== M ==
†—Named as a starter ‡—Did not participate (see notes) #—Named Pro Bowl MVP/co-MVP (or equivalent)

Name	Position	Year(s) selected	Franchise(s) represented	Notes
Bill Maas	DT	1986, 1987	Kansas City Chiefs	
Alex Mack	C	2010, 2013, 2015, 2016, 2017†, 2018†, 2021	Cleveland Browns (2010, 2013, 2015); Atlanta Falcons (2016–2018) San Francisco 49ers (2021)	2013—Selected as a replacement for Nick Mangold; 2016—Did not play in the Pro Bowl because the Falcons advanced to Super Bowl LI 2021—Selected as a replacement for Jason Kelce
Kevin Mack	RB	1985, 1987	Cleveland Browns	
Khalil Mack	DE, OLB	2015, 2016†‡, 2017‡, 2018†‡, 2019†‡, 2020†, 2022†	Oakland Raiders (2015–2017); Chicago Bears (2018–2020) Los Angeles Chargers (2022)	2016—Did not play in the Pro Bowl due to injury 2017—Did not play in the Pro Bowl due to injury 2018—Did not play in the Pro Bowl due to injury 2019—Did not play in the Pro Bowl due to injury
Tom Mack	G	1967 (NFL), 1968 (NFL), 1969 (NFL), 1970, 1971, 1972, 1973, 1974, 1975, 1977, 1978	Los Angeles Rams	
Tremain Mack	KR	1999	Cincinnati Bengals	
John Mackey	TE	1963 (NFL), 1965 (NFL), 1966 (NFL), 1967 (NFL), 1968 (NFL)	Baltimore Colts	
Jacque MacKinnon	TE	1966 (AFL), 1968 (AFL)	San Diego Chargers	
Jeremy Maclin	WR	2014	Philadelphia Eagles	
Sam Madison	CB	1999, 2000, 2001, 2002	Miami Dolphins	
Paul Maguire	P, LB	1963 (AFL), 1965 (AFL)	San Diego Chargers (1963); Buffalo Bills (1965)	
Patrick Mahomes	QB	2018†, 2019‡, 2020†, 2021, 2022†	Kansas City Chiefs	2019—Did not play in the Pro Bowl because the Chiefs advanced to Super Bowl LIV
Don Majkowski	QB	1989	Green Bay Packers	
Dave Manders	C	1966 (NFL)	Dallas Cowboys	
Nick Mangold	C	2008, 2009†, 2010‡, 2011†, 2013, 2014, 2015	New York Jets	2010—Did not play in the Pro Bowl due to injury 2013—Selected as a replacement for Max Unger; 2015—Selected as a replacement for Mike Pouncey
Logan Mankins	G	2007†, 2009†, 2010†, 2011‡, 2012‡, 2013, 2015	New England Patriots (2007, 2009–2013); Tampa Bay Buccaneers (2015)	2011—Did not play in the Pro Bowl because the Patriots advanced to Super Bowl XLVI; 2012—Did not play in the Pro Bowl due to injury 2015—Selected as a replacement for Trai Turner
Dexter Manley	DE	1986	Washington Redskins	
Charles Mann	DE	1987, 1988, 1989, 1991	Washington Redskins	
Archie Manning	QB	1978, 1979	New Orleans Saints	
Eli Manning	QB	2008, 2011, 2012, 2015	New York Giants	2011–Did not play in the Pro Bowl because the Giants advanced to Super Bowl XLVI
Peyton Manning	QB	1999, 2000, 2002, 2003, 2004#, 2005, 2006, 2007, 2008, 2009, 2010, 2012, 2013, 2014	Indianapolis Colts (1999, 2000, 2002–2010); Denver Broncos (2012–2014)	2004—Named MVP of game 2009–Did not play in the Pro Bowl because the Colts advanced to Super Bowl XLIV; 2013–Did not play in the Pro Bowl because the Broncos advanced to Super Bowl XLVIII
Bobby Maples	C	1968 (AFL)	Houston Oilers	
Gino Marchetti	DE	1954, 1955, 1956, 1957, 1958, 1959, 1960, 1961 (NFL), 1962 (NFL), 1963 (NFL)#, 1964 (NFL)	Baltimore Colts	1963—Named Outstanding Lineman of game
Chester Marcol	K	1972, 1974	Green Bay Packers	
Joe Marconi	FB	1963 (NFL)	Chicago Bears	
Olindo Mare	K	1999	Miami Dolphins	
Marc Mariani	KR	2010	Tennessee Titans	
Dan Marino	QB	1983, 1984, 1985, 1986, 1987, 1991, 1992, 1994, 1995	Miami Dolphins	
Brock Marion	S	2000, 2002, 2003	Miami Dolphins	
Fred Marion	S	1985	New England Patriots	
Ali Marpet	G	2021	Tampa Bay Buccaneers	
Jim Marsalis	CB	1969, 1970	Kansas City Chiefs	
Brandon Marshall	WR	2008, 2009, 2011#, 2012, 2013, 2015	Denver Broncos (2008, 2009); Miami Dolphins (2011); Chicago Bears (2012, 2013); New York Jets (2015)	2011—Named MVP of game
Jim Marshall	DE	1968, 1969	Minnesota Vikings	
Leonard Marshall	DE	1985, 1986	New York Giants	
Wilber Marshall	LB	1986, 1987, 1992	Chicago Bears (1986, 1987); Washington Redskins (1992)	
Curtis Martin	RB	1995, 1996, 1998, 2001, 2004	New England Patriots (1995, 1996); New York Jets (1998, 2001, 2004)	
Doug Martin	RB	2012, 2015	Tampa Bay Buccaneers	
Eric Martin	WR	1988	New Orleans Saints	
Harvey Martin	DE	1976, 1977, 1978, 1979	Dallas Cowboys	
Jim Martin	PK	1961	Detroit Lions	
Rod Martin	OLB	1983, 1984	Los Angeles Raiders	
Tony Martin	WR	1996	San Diego Chargers	
Wayne Martin	DE	1994	New Orleans Saints	
Zack Martin	G	2014, 2015, 2016†, 2017†‡, 2018†‡, 2019†‡, 2021†‡, 2022†	Dallas Cowboys	2017—Did not play in the Pro Bowl due to injury 2018—Did not play in the Pro Bowl due to injury 2019—Did not play in the Pro Bowl due to injury 2021—Did not play in the Pro Bowl due to injury
John Martinkovic	DE	1953, 1954, 1955	Green Bay Packers	
Russell Maryland	DT	1993	Dallas Cowboys	
Derrick Mason	WR	2000, 2003	Tennessee Titans	
Tommy Mason	RB	1962, 1963, 1964	Minnesota Vikings	
Carlton Massey	DE	1955	Cleveland Browns	
Robert Massey	CB	1992	Phoenix Cardinals	
Ray Mathews	HB	1952, 1955	Pittsburgh Steelers	
Ryan Mathews	RB	2011	San Diego Chargers	
Tyrann Mathieu	S	2015‡, 2020†, 2021	Arizona Cardinals (2015); Kansas City Chiefs (2020, 2021)	2015—Did not play in the Pro Bowl due to injury
Bill Mathis	FB	1961 (AFL), 1963 (AFL)	New York Titans/Jets	
Evan Mathis	G	2013, 2014	Philadelphia Eagles	2013—Selected as a replacement for Louis Vasquez; 2014—Selected as a replacement for Jahri Evans
Jerome Mathis	KR	2005	Houston Texans	
Rashean Mathis	CB	2006	Jacksonville Jaguars	
Robert Mathis	DE, OLB	2008, 2009‡, 2010†, 2012, 2013	Indianapolis Colts	2009—Did not play in the Pro Bowl because the Colts advanced to Super Bowl XLIV
Terance Mathis	WR	1994	Atlanta Falcons	
Ollie Matson	HB	1952, 1954, 1955#, 1956, 1957, 1958	Chicago Cardinals	1955—Named MVP of game
Archie Matsos	LB	1960 (AFL), 1961 (AFL), 1962 (AFL), 1963 (AFL)	Buffalo Bills (1960–1962); Oakland Raiders (1963)	
Tom Matte	RB	1968, 1969	Baltimore Colts	
Bruce Matthews	G	1988, 1989, 1990, 1991, 1992, 1993, 1994, 1995, 1996, 1997, 1998, 1999, 2000, 2001	Houston Oilers (1988–1996); Tennessee Oilers (1997, 1998); Tennessee Titans (1999–2001)	
Clay Matthews Jr.	LB	1985, 1987, 1988, 1989	Cleveland Browns	
Clay Matthews III	OLB	2009, 2010, 2011, 2012, 2014, 2015	Green Bay Packers	
Jake Matthews	OT	2018	Atlanta Falcons	2018—Selected as a replacement for Trent Williams
Marv Matuszak	LB	1953, 1957, 1962 (AFL)	Pittsburgh Steelers (1953); San Francisco 49ers (1957); Buffalo Bills (1962)	
Kevin Mawae	C	1999, 2000, 2001, 2002, 2003, 2004, 2008, 2009	New York Jets (1999–2004); Tennessee Titans (2008, 2009)	2009—Selected as a replacement for Jeff Saturday
Mark May	G	1988	Washington Redskins	
Jermane Mayberry	G	2002	Philadelphia Eagles	
Tony Mayberry	C	1997, 1998, 1999	Tampa Bay Buccaneers	
Rueben Mayes	RB	1986, 1987	New Orleans Saints	
Don Maynard	WR	1965 (AFL), 1967 (AFL), 1968 (AFL), 1969 (AFL)	New York Jets	
Jerod Mayo	ILB	2010, 2012	New England Patriots	
Jerry Mays	DE	1962 (AFL), 1964 (AFL), 1965 (AFL), 1966 (AFL), 1967 (AFL), 1968 (AFL), 1970	Dallas Texans (1962); Kansas City Chiefs (1964–1968, 1970)	
Fred McAfee	ST	2002	New Orleans Saints	
Pat McAfee	P	2014, 2016	Indianapolis Colts	
Chris McAlister	CB	2003, 2004, 2006	Baltimore Ravens	
Deuce McAllister	RB	2002, 2003	New Orleans Saints	
Mat McBriar	P	2006, 2010	Dallas Cowboys	
Christian McCaffrey	RB	2019‡	Carolina Panthers	2019—Did not play in the Pro Bowl due to injury
Ed McCaffrey	WR	1998	Denver Broncos	
Keenan McCardell	WR	1996, 2003	Jacksonville Jaguars (1996); Tampa Bay Buccaneers (2003)	
Larry McCarren	C	1982, 1983	Green Bay Packers	
Le'Ron McClain	FB	2008, 2009	Baltimore Ravens	
Cy McClairen	E	1957	Pittsburgh Steelers	
Curtis McClinton	HB	1962 (AFL), 1966 (AFL), 1967 (AFL)	Dallas Texans (1962); Kansas City Chiefs (1966, 1967)	
Kent McCloughan	CB	1966 (AFL), 1967 (AFL)	Oakland Raiders	
Dexter McCluster	RB	2013	Kansas City Chiefs	
Darris McCord	DE	1957	Detroit Lions	
Mike McCormack	OT	1951, 1956, 1957, 1960, 1961, 1962	New York Yanks (1951); Cleveland Browns (1956, 1957, 1960–1962)	
Devin McCourty	CB, FS	2010, 2016‡	New England Patriots	2016-Did not play in the Pro Bowl because the Patriots advanced to Super Bowl LI
Gerald McCoy	DT	2012, 2013, 2014, 2015, 2016†, 2017	Tampa Bay Buccaneers	
LeSean McCoy	RB	2011† 2013, 2014, 2015‡, 2016‡, 2017	Philadelphia Eagles (2011, 2013, 2014); Buffalo Bills (2015–2017)	2015—Did not play in the Pro Bowl due to injury 2016—Did not play in the Pro Bowl due to injury
Michael McCrary	DE	1998, 1999	Baltimore Ravens	
Lawrence McCutcheon	RB	1973, 1974, 1975, 1976, 1977	Los Angeles Rams	
Ed McDaniel	LB	1998	Minnesota Vikings	
Randall McDaniel	G	1989, 1990, 1991, 1992, 1993, 1994, 1995, 1996, 1997, 1998, 1999, 2000	Minnesota Vikings (1989–1999); Tampa Bay Buccaneers (2000)	
Terry McDaniel	CB	1992, 1993, 1994, 1995, 1996	Los Angeles Raiders (1992–1994); Oakland Raiders (1995, 1996)	
Ron McDole	DE	1965 (AFL), 1967 (AFL)	Buffalo Bills	
Tim McDonald	S	1989, 1991, 1992, 1993, 1994, 1995	Phoenix Cardinals (1989, 1991, 1992); San Francisco 49ers (1993–1995)	
Tommy McDonald	WR	1958, 1959, 1960, 1961, 1962, 1965	Philadelphia Eagles (1958–1962); Los Angeles Rams (1965)	
Hugh McElhenny	HB	1952, 1953, 1956, 1957#, 1958, 1961 (NFL)	San Francisco 49ers (1952, 1953, 1956–1958); Minnesota Vikings (1961)	1957—Named MVP of game
Vann McElroy	FS	1983, 1984	Los Angeles Raiders	
Bud McFadin	DT	1955, 1956, 1961 (AFL), 1962 (AFL), 1963 (AFL)	Los Angeles Rams (1955, 1956); Denver Broncos (1961–1963)	
Willis McGahee	RB	2007, 2011	Baltimore Ravens (2007); Denver Broncos (2011)	2007—Selected as a replacement for LaDainian Tomlinson; 2011—Selected as a replacement for Arian Foster
Ben McGee	DE	1966 (NFL), 1968 (NFL)	Pittsburgh Steelers	
Max McGee	WR	1961	Green Bay Packers	
Terrence McGee	KR	2004	Buffalo Bills	
Willie McGinest	OLB	1996, 2003	New England Patriots	
Chester McGlockton	DT	1994, 1995, 1996, 1997	Los Angeles Raiders (1994); Oakland Raiders (1995–1997)	
Thurman McGraw	DT	1950	Detroit Lions	
Pat McInally	P	1981	Cincinnati Bengals	
Guy McIntyre	G	1989, 1990, 1991, 1992, 1993	San Francisco 49ers	
Marlin McKeever	LB	1966 (NFL)	Los Angeles Rams	
Benardrick McKinney	ILB	2018	Houston Texans	
Bryant McKinnie	OT	2009	Minnesota Vikings	
Leon McLaughlin	C	1954	Los Angeles Rams	
Terry McLaurin	WR	2022	Washington Commanders	
Bob McLeod	TE	1961 (AFL)	Houston Oilers	
Jim McMahon	QB	1985	Chicago Bears	
Steve McMichael	DT	1986, 1987	Chicago Bears	
Erik McMillan	S	1988, 1989	New York Jets	
Ernie McMillan	OT	1965, 1967, 1969, 1970	St. Louis Cardinals	
Audray McMillian	CB	1992	Minnesota Vikings	
Chuck McMurtry	DT	1961 (AFL)	Buffalo Bills	
Donovan McNabb	QB	2000, 2001, 2002, 2003, 2004, 2009	Philadelphia Eagles	
Steve McNair	QB	2000, 2003, 2005	Tennessee Titans	
Charlie McNeil	DB	1961 (AFL)	San Diego Chargers	
Clifton McNeil	WR	1968	San Francisco 49ers	
Freeman McNeil	RB	1982, 1984, 1985	New York Jets	
Gerald McNeil	KR	1987	Cleveland Browns	
Ryan McNeil	CB	2001	San Diego Chargers	
Marcus McNeill	OT	2006, 2007	San Diego Chargers	2006—Selected as a replacement for Willie Anderson; 2007—Selected as a replacement for Jonathan Ogden
Bill McPeak	DE	1952, 1953, 1956	Pittsburgh Steelers	
Jake McQuaide	LS	2016, 2017	St. Louis/Los Angeles Rams	
Ed Meador	DB	1960, 1964 (NFL), 1965 (NFL), 1966 (NFL), 1967 (NFL), 1968 (NFL)	Los Angeles Rams	
Natrone Means	RB	1994	San Diego Chargers	
Karl Mecklenburg	LB	1985, 1986, 1987, 1989, 1991, 1993	Denver Broncos	
Dave Meggett	KR	1989, 1996	New York Giants (1989); New England Patriots (1996)	
Lance Mehl	ILB	1985	New York Jets	
Dale Meinert	LB	1963, 1965, 1967	St. Louis Cardinals	
Henry Melton	DE	2012	Chicago Bears	
Mike Mercer	K, P	1967 (AFL)	Buffalo Bills	
Don Meredith	QB	1966, 1967, 1968	Dallas Cowboys	
Dudley Meredith	DT	1965 (AFL)	Buffalo Bills	
Brandon Meriweather	FS	2009, 2010	New England Patriots	
Shawne Merriman	OLB	2005, 2006, 2007	San Diego Chargers	
Mike Merriweather	OLB	1984, 1985, 1986	Pittsburgh Steelers	
Jerry Mertens	DB	1958	San Francisco 49ers	
DK Metcalf	WR	2020	Seattle Seahawks	
Eric Metcalf	KR, RB	1993, 1994, 1997	Cleveland Browns (1993, 1994); San Diego Chargers (1997)	
Terry Metcalf	RB	1974, 1975, 1977	St. Louis Cardinals	
Rich Michael	T	1962 (AFL), 1963 (AFL)	Houston Oilers	
Lou Michaels	LDE	1962, 1963	Pittsburgh Steelers	
Walt Michaels	LB	1955, 1956, 1957, 1958, 1959	Cleveland Browns	
Art Michalik	MG	1953	San Francisco 49ers	
Terdell Middleton	RB	1978	Green Bay Packers	
Quintin Mikell	S	2009	Philadelphia Eagles	
Nick Mike-Mayer	K	1973	Atlanta Falcons	
Glyn Milburn	KR	1995, 1999	Denver Broncos (1995); Chicago Bears (1999)	
Keith Millard	DT	1988, 1989	Minnesota Vikings	
Matt Millen	LB	1988	Los Angeles Raiders	
Alan Miller	FB	1961 (AFL)	Oakland Raiders	
Anthony Miller	WR	1989, 1990, 1992, 1993, 1995	San Diego Chargers (1989, 1990, 1992, 1993); Denver Broncos (1995)	
Chris Miller	QB	1991	Atlanta Falcons	
Fred Miller	DT	1967, 1968, 1969	Baltimore Colts	
Heath Miller		2009, 2012	Pittsburgh Steelers	
Jamir Miller	LB	2001	Cleveland Browns	
Junior Miller	TE	1980, 1981	Atlanta Falcons	
Justin Miller	KR	2006	New York Jets	
Lamar Miller	RB	2018	Houston Texans	2018—Selected as a replacement for Phillip Lindsay
Paul Miller	DE	1955, 1956	Los Angeles Rams	
Von Miller	OLB	2011†, 2012‡, 2014, 2015‡, 2016†, 2017†, 2018†, 2019†	Denver Broncos	2012—Did not play in the Pro Bowl due to injury 2015—Did not play in the Pro Bowl because the Broncos advanced to Super Bowl 50
Zach Miller	TE	2010	Oakland Raiders	2010—Selected as a replacement for Antonio Gates
Hanik Milligan	ST	2005	San Diego Chargers	
Lawyer Milloy	SS	1998, 1999, 2001, 2002	New England Patriots	
John Henry Mills	RB, TE, LB	1996	Houston Oilers	
Pete Mills	WR	1965 (AFL)	Buffalo Bills	
Sam Mills	LB	1987, 1988, 1991, 1992, 1996	New Orleans Saints (1987, 1988, 1991, 1992); Carolina Panthers (1996)	
Gene Mingo	PK	1960 (AFL), 1962 (AFL)	Denver Broncos	
Frank Minnifield	CB	1986, 1987, 1988, 1989	Cleveland Browns	
Bob Mischak	LG, RG	1961 (AFL), 1962 (AFL)	New York Titans	
Bobby Mitchell	HB, FL	1960, 1962, 1963, 1964	Cleveland Browns (1960); Washington Redskins (1962–1964)	
Brian Mitchell	KR	1995	Washington Redskins	
Jim Mitchell	TE	1969, 1972	Atlanta Falcons	
Keith Mitchell	OLB	2000	New Orleans Saints	
Leroy Mitchell	CB	1968 (AFL)	Boston Patriots	
Lydell Mitchell	RB	1975, 1976, 1977	Baltimore Colts	
Ron Mix	OT	1961 (AFL), 1962 (AFL), 1963 (AFL), 1964 (AFL), 1965 (AFL), 1966 (AFL), 1967 (AFL), 1968 (AFL)	San Diego Chargers	
Joe Mixon	RB	2021‡	Cincinnati Bengals	2021—Did not play in the Pro Bowl because the Bengals advanced to Super Bowl LVI
Dick Modzelewski	DT	1964	Cleveland Browns	
Dicky Moegle	RS	1955	San Francisco 49ers	
Ralf Mojsiejenko	P	1987	San Diego Chargers	
Art Monk	WR	1984, 1985, 1986	Washington Redskins	
Joe Montana	QB	1981, 1983, 1984, 1985, 1987, 1989, 1990, 1993	San Francisco 49ers (1981, 1983–1985, 1987, 1989, 1990); Kansas City Chiefs (1993)	
Greg Montgomery	P	1993	Houston Oilers	
Wilbert Montgomery	RB	1978, 1979	Philadelphia Eagles	
Max Montoya	G	1986, 1988, 1989, 1993	Cincinnati Bengals (1986, 1988, 1989); Los Angeles Raiders (1993)	
Warren Moon	QB	1988, 1989, 1990, 1991, 1992, 1993, 1994, 1995, 1997#	Houston Oilers (1988–1993); Minnesota Vikings (1994, 1995); Seattle Seahawks (1997)	1997—Named MVP of game
Brandon Moore	OG	2011	New York Jets	
Dave Moore	LS	2006	Tampa Bay Buccaneers	
Herman Moore	WR	1994, 1995, 1996, 1997	Detroit Lions	
Kenny Moore II	CB	2021	Indianapolis Colts	
Lenny Moore	HB	1956, 1958, 1959, 1960, 1961, 1962, 1964	Baltimore Colts	
Nat Moore	WR	1977	Miami Dolphins	
Rob Moore	WR	1994, 1997	New York Jets (1994); Arizona Cardinals (1997)	
Tom Moore	RB	1962	Green Bay Packers	
Wayne Moore	OT	1973	Miami Dolphins	
William Moore	SS	2012	Atlanta Falcons	
Zeke Moore	CB	1970	Houston Oilers	
Brian Moorman	P	2005, 2006	Buffalo Bills	
Sean Morey	ST	2008	Arizona Cardinals	
Dan Morgan	ILB	2004	Carolina Panthers	
Stanley Morgan	WR	1979, 1980, 1986, 1987	New England Patriots	
Milt Morin	TE	1968, 1971	Cleveland Browns	
Earl Morrall	QB	1957, 1968	Pittsburgh Steelers (1957); Baltimore Colts (1968)	
Alfred Morris	RB	2013, 2014	Washington Redskins	
Dennit Morris	LB	1961 (AFL)	Houston Oilers	
Joe Morris	RB	1985, 1986	New York Giants	
Johnny Morris	HB	1960	Chicago Bears	
Jon Morris	C	1964 (AFL), 1965 (AFL), 1966 (AFL), 1967 (AFL), 1968 (AFL), 1969 (AFL), 1970	Boston Patriots	
Mercury Morris	KR, RB	1971, 1972, 1973‡	Miami Dolphins	1973—Did not play in the Pro Bowl due to injury
Fred "Curly" Morrison	HB	1955	Cleveland Browns	
John Morrow	C	1961 (NFL), 1963 (NFL)	Cleveland Browns	
Mitch Morse	C	2022	Buffalo Bills	
Thomas Morstead	P	2012	New Orleans Saints	
Don Mosebar	C	1986, 1990, 1991	Los Angeles Raiders	
Mark Moseley	K	1979, 1982	Washington Redskins	
Haven Moses	WR	1969 (AFL), 1973	Buffalo Bills (1969); Denver Broncos (1973)	
C. J. Mosley	ILB	2014, 2016‡, 2017†, 2018†, 2022	Baltimore Ravens (2014, 2016–2018) New York Jets (2022)	2016—Did not play in the Pro Bowl due to injury
Randy Moss	WR	1998, 1999#, 2000, 2002, 2003, 2007‡	Minnesota Vikings (1998–2000, 2002, 2003); New England Patriots (2007)	1999—Named MVP of game 2007—Did not play in the Pro Bowl due to injury
Santana Moss	WR	2005	Washington Redskins	
Marion Motley	FB	1950	Cleveland Browns	
Eric Moulds	WR	1998, 2000, 2002	Buffalo Bills	
Howard Mudd	OG	1966, 1967, 1968	San Francisco 49ers	
Ovie Mughelli	FB	2010†	Atlanta Falcons	
Muhsin Muhammad	WR	1999, 2004	Carolina Panthers	
Don Muhlbach	LS	2012, 2018	Detroit Lions	
Herb Mul-Key	KR	1973	Washington Redskins	
Mike Munchak	G	1984, 1985, 1987, 1988, 1989, 1990, 1991, 1992, 1993	Houston Oilers	
Chuck Muncie	RB	1979, 1981, 1982	New Orleans Saints (1979); San Diego Chargers (1981, 1982)	
Anthony Muñoz	OT	1981, 1982, 1983, 1984, 1985, 1986, 1987, 1988, 1989, 1990, 1991	Cincinnati Bengals	
Mark Murphy	FS	1983	Washington Redskins	
DeMarco Murray	RB	2013, 2014, 2016	Dallas Cowboys (2013, 2014); Tennessee Titans (2016)	
Eddie Murray	K	1980, 1989	Detroit Lions	
Kyler Murray	QB	2020, 2021	Arizona Cardinals	
Latavius Murray	RB	2015	Oakland Raiders	2015—Selected as a replacement for Jonathan Stewart
Jim Mutscheller	TE	1957	Baltimore Colts	
Chip Myers	WR	1972	Cincinnati Bengals	
Chris Myers	C	2011, 2012	Houston Texans	2011—Selected as a replacement for Maurkice Pouncey
Jason Myers	K	2018†, 2022†	New York Jets (2018) Seattle Seahawks (2022)	
Tom Myers	S	1979	New Orleans Saints	
