= List of Pro Bowl players, B =

The following is a list of players, both past and current, who have been selected to play in the NFL's annual Pro Bowl game, beginning with the 1950 season.

Between 1938 and 1942, an NFL all star team played the league champion in the NFL All-Star Game. Participants in these games are not recognized by the NFL as Pro Bowlers, and they are not included in this list. No games were played between 1943 and 1950.

Between 1961 and 1969, the NFL and AFL played separate all-star games. This list includes players who were selected to play in the American Football League All-Star game during that period.

== B ==
†—Named as a starter ‡—Did not participate (see notes) #—Named Pro Bowl MVP/co-MVP (or equivalent)

Name	Position	Year(s) selected	Franchise(s) represented	Notes
Jason Babin	DE	2010, 2011	Tennessee Titans (2010); Philadelphia Eagles (2011)	
Coy Bacon	DE	1972, 1976, 1977	Los Angeles Rams (1972); Cincinnati Bengals (1976, 1977)	
Champ Bailey	CB	2000†, 2001, 2002, 2003, 2004, 2005, 2006, 2007†, 2009, 2010, 2011†, 2012†	Washington Redskins (2000–2003); Denver Broncos (2004–2007, 2009–2012)	2010—Selected as a replacement for Nnamdi Asomugha
Dan Bailey	K	2015†	Dallas Cowboys	
Jake Bailey	P	2020†	New England Patriots	
Johnny Bailey	KR	1992	Phoenix Cardinals	
Al Baker	DE	1978, 1979, 1980	Detroit Lions	
Budda Baker	ST, FS	2017†, 2019†, 2020†, 2021†, 2022†	Arizona Cardinals	
Dave Baker	DB	1959	San Francisco 49ers	
Jon Baker	LB	1951, 1952	New York Giants	
Sam Baker	K, P	1956, 1963 (NFL), 1964 (NFL), 1968 (NFL)	Washington Redskins (1956); Dallas Cowboys (1963); Philadelphia Eagles (1964, 1968)	
Tony Baker	RB	1969 (NFL)	New Orleans Saints	
David Bakhtiari	OT	2016, 2019†‡, 2020†	Green Bay Packers	2016—Selected as a replacement for Jason Peters; 2019—Did not play in the Pro Bowl due to injury
Jim Bakken	K	1965 (NFL), 1967 (NFL), 1975, 1976	St. Louis Cardinals	
Doug Baldwin	WR	2016, 2017	Seattle Seahawks	2016—Selected as a replacement for Larry Fitzgerald; 2017—Selected as a replacement for Larry Fitzgerald
Jerry Ball	DT	1989, 1990, 1991	Detroit Lions	
Howard Ballard	OT	1992, 1993	Buffalo Bills	
Gary Ballman	OE	1964 (NFL), 1965 (NFL)	Pittsburgh Steelers	
Bruno Banducci	G	1954	San Francisco 49ers	
Tony Banfield	DB	1961 (AFL), 1962 (AFL), 1963 (AFL)	Houston Oilers	
Carl Banks	OLB	1987	New York Giants	
Chip Banks	OLB	1982, 1983, 1985, 1986	Cleveland Browns	
Tom Banks	C	1975, 1976, 1977, 1978	St. Louis Cardinals	
Alex Bannister	WR	2003	Seattle Seahawks	
Gary Barbaro	FS	1980, 1981, 1982	Kansas City Chiefs	
Marion Barber III	RB	2007	Dallas Cowboys	
Ronde Barber	CB	2001, 2004, 2005, 2006, 2008	Tampa Bay Buccaneers	2008—Selected as a replacement for Charles Woodson
Stew Barber	OT	1963 (AFL), 1964 (AFL), 1965 (AFL), 1966 (AFL), 1967 (AFL)	Buffalo Bills	
Tiki Barber	RB	2004, 2005, 2006	New York Giants	
Bryan Barker	P	1997	Jacksonville Jaguars	
Saquon Barkley	RB	2018, 2022†	New York Giants	
Jerome Barkum	WR	1973	New York Jets	
Billy Ray Barnes	HB	1957, 1958, 1959	Philadelphia Eagles	
Erich Barnes	CB	1959, 1961 (NFL), 1962 (NFL), 1963 (NFL), 1964 (NFL), 1968 (NFL)	Chicago Bears (1959); New York Giants (1961–1964); Cleveland Browns (1968)	
Mike Barnes	DT	1977	Baltimore Colts	
Walt Barnes	G	1950	Philadelphia Eagles	
Fred Barnett	WR	1992	Philadelphia Eagles	
Lem Barney	CB	1967 (NFL), 1968 (NFL), 1969 (NFL), 1972, 1973, 1975, 1976	Detroit Lions	
Gary Barnidge	TE	2015	Cleveland Browns	2015—Selected as a replacement for Rob Gronkowski
Anthony Barr	OLB	2015, 2016, 2017‡, 2018	Minnesota Vikings	2015—Selected as a replacement for Jamie Collins; 2016—Selected as a replacement for Vic Beasley; 2017—Did not play in the Pro Bowl due to injury
Terry Barr	HB	1963 (NFL), 1964 (NFL)	Detroit Lions	
Shaquil Barrett	OLB	2019, 2021	Tampa Bay Buccaneers	
Steve Bartkowski	QB	1980, 1981	Atlanta Falcons	
Harris Barton	OT	1993	San Francisco 49ers	
Mike Bartrum	LS	2005	Philadelphia Eagles	
Dick Barwegan	G	1950, 1951, 1952, 1953	Chicago Bears (1950–1952); Baltimore Colts (1953)	
Connor Barwin	OLB	2014	Philadelphia Eagles	
Dick Bass	RB, FB	1962 (NFL), 1963 (NFL), 1966 (NFL)	Los Angeles Rams	
Bill Bates	ST	1984	Dallas Cowboys	
Michael Bates	KR	1996, 1997, 1998, 1999, 2000	Carolina Panthers	
Sammy Baugh	QB	1951	Washington Redskins	
Maxie Baughan	LB	1960, 1961 (NFL), 1963 (NFL), 1964 (NFL), 1965 (NFL), 1966 (NFL), 1967 (NFL), 1968 (NFL), 1969 (NFL)	Philadelphia Eagles (1960, 1961, 1963–1965); Los Angeles Rams (1966–1969)	
Bob Baumhower	NT	1979, 1981, 1982, 1983, 1984	Miami Dolphins	
Mark Bavaro	TE	1986, 1987	New York Giants	
Zane Beadles	G	2012	Denver Broncos	2012—Selected as a replacement for Logan Mankins
Fred Beasley	FB	2003	San Francisco 49ers	
Vic Beasley	OLB	2016	Atlanta Falcons	2016—Did not play in the Pro Bowl because the Falcons advanced to Super Bowl LI
Jon Beason	LB	2008, 2009, 2010	Carolina Panthers	
Odell Beckham Jr.	WR	2014, 2015, 2016†	New York Giants	2014—Selected as a replacement for Calvin Johnson
Chuck Bednarik	C, LB	1950, 1951, 1952, 1953#, 1954, 1956, 1957, 1960	Philadelphia Eagles	1953—Named MVP of game
Dave Behrman	C	1965 (AFL)	Buffalo Bills	
Jim Beirne	WR	1969 (AFL)	Houston Oilers	
Bobby Bell	DE, LB	1964 (AFL), 1965 (AFL), 1966 (AFL), 1967 (AFL), 1968 (AFL), 1969 (AFL), 1970, 1971 1972	Kansas City Chiefs	
Greg Bell	RB	1984	Buffalo Bills	
Kendrell Bell	ILB	2001	Pittsburgh Steelers	
Le'Veon Bell	RB	2014‡, 2016‡, 2017†	Pittsburgh Steelers	2014—Did not play in the Pro Bowl due to injury 2016—Did not play in the Pro Bowl due to injury
Todd Bell	SS	1984	Chicago Bears	
Yeremiah Bell	SS	2009	Miami Dolphins	2009—Selected as a replacement for Antoine Bethea
Nick Bellore	ST	2020	Seattle Seahawks	
Al Bemiller	G	1965 (AFL)	Buffalo Bills	
Rolf Benirschke	K	1982	San Diego Chargers	
Cornelius Bennett	OLB	1988, 1990, 1991, 1992, 1993	Buffalo Bills	
Darren Bennett	P	1995, 2000	San Diego Chargers	
Martellus Bennett	TE	2014	Chicago Bears	2014—Selected as a replacement for Rob Gronkowski
Michael Bennett	DE	2015, 2016, 2017	Seattle Seahawks	2017—Selected as a replacement for Everson Griffen
Michael Bennett	RB	2002	Minnesota Vikings	
Brad Benson	OT	1986	New York Giants	
LeCharles Bentley	G, C	2003, 2005	New Orleans Saints	
Mitch Berger	P	1999, 2004	Minnesota Vikings (1999); New Orleans Saints (2004)	
Bill Bergey	LB	1969 (AFL), 1974, 1976, 1977, 1978	Cincinnati Bengals (1969); Philadelphia Eagles (1974, 1976–78)	
Bertrand Berry	DE	2004	Arizona Cardinals	
Bob Berry	QB	1969 (NFL)	Atlanta Falcons	
Eric Berry	SS	2010†, 2012†, 2013, 2015, 2016‡	Kansas City Chiefs	2016—Did not play in the Pro Bowl due to injury
Raymond Berry	OE	1958, 1959, 1960, 1961 (NFL), 1963 (NFL), 1964 (NFL)	Baltimore Colts	
Jim Bertelsen	HB, KR	1973	Los Angeles Rams	
Antoine Bethea	SS	2007, 2009‡, 2014	Indianapolis Colts	2007—Selected as a replacement for Troy Polamalu; 2009—Did not play in the Pro Bowl due to injury 2014—Selected as a replacement for Kam Chancellor
Elvin Bethea	DE	1969 (AFL), 1971, 1972, 1973, 1974, 1975, 1978, 1979	Houston Oilers	
Justin Bethel	ST	2013, 2014, 2015	Arizona Cardinals	
Doug Betters	DE	1983	Miami Dolphins	
Jerome Bettis	RB	1993, 1994, 1996, 1997, 2001, 2004	Los Angeles/St. Louis Rams (1993, 1994); Pittsburgh Steelers (1996, 1997, 2001, 2004)	
Steve Beuerlein	QB	1999	Carolina Panthers	
Dean Biasucci	K	1987	Indianapolis Colts	
Duane Bickett	OLB	1987	Indianapolis Colts	
Josh Bidwell	P	2005	Tampa Bay Buccaneers	
Dick Bielski	TE	1961 (NFL)	Dallas Cowboys	
Verlon Biggs	DE	1966 (AFL), 1967 (AFL), 1968 (AFL)	New York Jets	
Fred Biletnikoff	WR	1967 (AFL) 1969 (AFL), 1970, 1971, 1973, 1974	Oakland Raiders	
Les Bingaman	NG	1951, 1953	Detroit Lions	
David Binn	LS	2006	San Diego Chargers	
Carl Birdsong	P	1983	St. Louis Cardinals	
Dan Birdwell	DT	1968 (AFL)	Oakland Raiders	
Matt Birk	C	2000, 2001‡, 2003†, 2004, 2006†, 2007	Minnesota Vikings	2002—Did not play in the Pro Bowl for personal reasons
Rob Bironas	K	2007	Tennessee Titans	
Bill Bishop	DT	1954	Chicago Bears	
Blaine Bishop	SS	1995, 1996, 1997, 2000	Houston Oilers/Tennessee Oilers/Titans	
Don Bishop	CB	1962 (NFL)	Dallas Cowboys	
Keith Bishop	G	1986, 1987	Denver Broncos	
Sonny Bishop	G	1968 (AFL)	Houston Oilers	
Joel Bitonio	G	2018, 2019, 2020†, 2021†, 2022†	Cleveland Browns	2018—Selected as a replacement for David DeCastro; 2019—Selected as a replacement for David DeCastro
Bennie Blades	FS	1991	Detroit Lions	
Brian Blades	WR	1989	Seattle Seahawks	
George Blair	K	1961 (AFL)	San Diego Chargers	
Matt Blair	LB	1977, 1978, 1979, 1980, 1981, 1982	Minnesota Vikings	
Jeff Blake	QB	1995	Cincinnati Bengals	
Cary Blanchard	K	1996	Indianapolis Colts	
George Blanda	QB, K	1961 (AFL), 1962 (AFL), 1963 (AFL), 1967 (AFL)	Houston Oilers (1961–1963); Oakland Raiders (1967)	
Sid Blanks	RB	1964 (AFL)	Houston Oilers	
Drew Bledsoe	QB	1994, 1996, 1997, 2002	New England Patriots (1994, 1996, 1997); Buffalo Bills (2002)	
Mel Blount	CB	1975, 1976, 1978, 1979, 1981,	Pittsburgh Steelers	
Forrest Blue	C	1971, 1972, 1973, 1974	San Francisco 49ers	
Dré Bly	CB	2003, 2004	Detroit Lions	
Kim Bokamper	OLB	1979	Miami Dolphins	
Anquan Boldin	WR	2003, 2006, 2008†	Arizona Cardinals	
Steve Bono	QB	1995	Kansas City Chiefs	
Marty Booker	WR	2002	Chicago Bears	
Emerson Boozer	RB	1966 (AFL), 1968 (AFL)	New York Jets	
Mark Bortz	G	1988, 1990	Chicago Bears	
Mike Boryla	QB	1975	Philadelphia Eagles	
Joey Bosa	DE, OLB	2017†‡, 2019†‡, 2020†, 2021†‡	Los Angeles Chargers	2017—Did not play in the Pro Bowl due to injury 2019—Did not play in the Pro Bowl due to injury 2021—Did not play in the Pro Bowl due to injury
Nick Bosa	DE	2019†‡, 2021†‡, 2022†	San Francisco 49ers	2019—Did not play in the Pro Bowl because the 49ers advanced to Super Bowl LIV 2021—Did not play in the Pro Bowl due to injury
Bruce Bosley	G, C	1960, 1965 (NFL), 1966 (NFL), 1967 (NFL)	San Francisco 49ers	
Don Bosseler	FB	1959	Washington Redskins	
Tony Boselli	OT	1996, 1997, 1998, 1999, 2000†	Jacksonville Jaguars	
Jeff Bostic	C	1983	Washington Redskins	
Keith Bostic	SS	1987	Houston Oilers	
David Boston	WR	2001	Arizona Cardinals	
Chris Boswell	K	2017†	Pittsburgh Steelers	
Peter Boulware	OLB	1998, 1999, 2002, 2003	Baltimore Ravens	
A. J. Bouye	CB	2017†	Jacksonville Jaguars	
Dwayne Bowe	WR	2010	Kansas City Chiefs	
Tim Bowens	DT	1998, 2002	Miami Dolphins	
NaVorro Bowman	ILB	2012‡, 2013, 2015	San Francisco 49ers	2012—Did not play in the Pro Bowl because the 49ers advanced to Super Bowl XLVII
Cloyce Box	OE	1950, 1952	Detroit Lions	
Bob Boyd	OE	1954	Los Angeles Rams	
Bobby Boyd	DB	1964 (NFL), 1968 (NFL)	Baltimore Colts	
Stephen Boyd	LB	1999, 2000	Detroit Lions	
Garland Boyette	MLB	1968 (AFL), 1969 (AFL)	Houston Oilers	
Ordell Braase	DE	1966 (NFL), 1967 (NFL)	Baltimore Colts	
Tony Brackens	DE	1999	Jacksonville Jaguars	
James Bradberry	CB	2020	New York Giants	
Bill Bradley	FS	1971, 1972, 1973	Philadelphia Eagles	
Charlie Bradshaw	OT	1963 (NFL), 1964 (NFL)	Pittsburgh Steelers	
Terry Bradshaw	QB	1975, 1978, 1979	Pittsburgh Steelers	
Tom Brady	QB	2001, 2004, 2005, 2007†‡, 2009‡, 2010, 2011‡, 2012‡, 2013‡, 2014‡, 2015‡, 2016‡, 2017†‡, 2018‡, 2021‡	New England Patriots (2001, 2004, 2005, 2007, 2009–2018); Tampa Bay Buccaneers (2021)	2007—Did not play in the Pro Bowl due to injury 2009—Did not play in the Pro Bowl due to injury 2011—Did not play in the Pro Bowl because the Patriots advanced to Super Bowl XLVI; 2012—Did not play in the Pro Bowl due to injury 2013—Did not play in the Pro Bowl due to injury 2014—Did not play in the Pro Bowl because the Patriots advanced to Super Bowl XLIX; 2015—Did not play in the Pro Bowl due to injury 2016—Did not play in the Pro Bowl because the Patriots advanced to Super Bowl LI; 2017—Did not play in the Pro Bowl because the Patriots advanced to Super Bowl LII; 2018—Did not play in the Pro Bowl because the Patriots advanced to Super Bowl LIII; 2021—Did not play in the Pro Bowl due to injury
John Bramlett	LB	1966 (AFL), 1967 (AFL)	Denver Broncos (1966); Miami Dolphins (1967)	
Cliff Branch	WR	1974, 1975, 1976, 1977	Oakland Raiders	
Mel Branch	DE	1961 (AFL), 1962 (AFL), 1963 (AFL)	Dallas Texans/Kansas City Chiefs	
Tyrone Braxton	SS	1996	Denver Broncos	
Ray Bray	MG	1950, 1951	Chicago Bears	
Robert Brazile	OLB	1976, 1977, 1978, 1979, 1980, 1981, 1982	Houston Oilers	
Rod Breedlove	LB	1962 (NFL)	Washington Redskins	
Drew Brees	QB	2004, 2006, 2008, 2009, 2010‡, 2011, 2012, 2013, 2014, 2016, 2017, 2018†‡, 2019	San Diego Chargers (2004); New Orleans Saints (2006, 2008–2014, 2016–2019)	2009—Did not play in the Pro Bowl because the Saints advanced to Super Bowl XLIV; 2012—Selected as a replacement for Robert Griffin III; 2014—Selected as a replacement for Ben Roethlisberger; 2016—Selected as a replacement for Matt Ryan; 2018—Did not play in the Pro Bowl due to injury
Hoby Brenner	TE	1987	New Orleans Saints	
Bob Breunig	MLB	1979, 1980, 1982	Dallas Cowboys	
Johnny Brewer	LB	1966 (NFL)	Cleveland Browns	
Pete Brewster	OE	1955, 1956	Cleveland Browns	
Greg Brezina	LB	1969 (NFL)	Atlanta Falcons	
Teddy Bridgewater	QB	2015	Minnesota Vikings	2015—Selected as a replacement for Carson Palmer
Lance Briggs	LB	2005, 2006‡, 2007‡, 2008†, 2009‡, 2010‡, 2011‡	Chicago Bears	2006—Did not play in the Pro Bowl due to injury 2007—Did not play in the Pro Bowl due to injury 2009—Did not play in the Pro Bowl due to injury 2010—Did not play in the Pro Bowl due to injury 2011—Did not play in the Pro Bowl due to injury
Larry Brink	DE	1950, 1951	Los Angeles Rams	
Marlin Briscoe	WR	1970	Buffalo Bills	
Gene Brito	DE	1953, 1955, 1956, 1957#, 1958	Washington Redskins	1957—Named Outstanding Lineman of game
John Brockington	RB	1971, 1972, 1973	Green Bay Packers	
John Brodie	QB	1965 (NFL), 1970	San Francisco 49ers	
Tommy Brooker	K	1964 (AFL)	Kansas City Chiefs	
Keith Brooking	MLB	2001, 2002, 2003, 2004, 2005	Atlanta Falcons	
Ahmad Brooks	OLB	2013‡	San Francisco 49ers	2013—Did not play in the Pro Bowl due to injury
Brandon Brooks	G	2017†‡, 2018†‡, 2019†‡	Philadelphia Eagles	2017—Did not play in the Pro Bowl because the Eagles advanced to Super Bowl LII; 2018—Did not play in the Pro Bowl due to injury 2019—Did not play in the Pro Bowl due to injury
Derrick Brooks	OLB	1997, 1998, 1999, 2000, 2001, 2002, 2003, 2004, 2005#, 2006, 2008‡	Tampa Bay Buccaneers	2005—Named MVP of game 2006—Selected as a replacement for Lance Briggs; 2008—Did not play in the Pro Bowl due to injury
James Brooks	RB	1986, 1988, 1989, 1990	Cincinnati Bengals	
Larry Brooks	DT	1976, 1977, 1978, 1979, 1980	Los Angeles Rams	
Michael Brooks	LB	1992	Denver Broncos	
Tom Brookshier	DB	1959, 1960	Philadelphia Eagles	
A. J. Brown	WR	2020, 2022†	Tennessee Titans (2020) Philadelphia Eagles (2022)	
Antonio Brown	KR, WR	2011, 2013, 2014, 2015‡, 2016‡, 2017†, 2018‡	Pittsburgh Steelers	2015—Did not play in the Pro Bowl due to injury 2016—Did not play in the Pro Bowl due to injury 2018—Did not play in the Pro Bowl due to injury
Bill Brown	FB	1964 (NFL), 1965 (NFL), 1967 (NFL), 1968 (NFL)	Minnesota Vikings	
Bob Brown	DT	1972	Green Bay Packers	
Bob Brown	OT	1965 (NFL), 1966 (NFL), 1968 (NFL), 1969 (NFL), 1970, 1971	Philadelphia Eagles (1965, 1966, 1968); Los Angeles Rams (1969, 1970); Oakland Raiders (1971)	
Chad Brown	OLB	1996, 1998, 1999	Seattle Seahawks	
Charlie Brown	WR	1982, 1983	Washington Redskins	
Dave Brown	CB	1984	Seattle Seahawks	
Duane Brown	OT	2012†, 2013, 2014, 2017, 2021	Houston Texans (2013–2014); Seattle Seahawks (2017, 2021)	2013—Selected as a replacement for Jason Peters; 2014—Selected as a replacement for Jason Peters; 2017—Selected as a replacement for Lane Johnson; 2021—Selected as a replacement for Trent Williams
Ed Brown	QB	1955, 1956	Chicago Bears	
Eddie Brown	KR	1976, 1977	Washington Redskins	
Eddie Brown	WR	1988	Cincinnati Bengals	
Hardy Brown	LB	1952	San Francisco 49ers	
Jammal Brown	OT	2006, 2008	New Orleans Saints	2006—Did not play in the Pro Bowl due to injury 2008—Selected as a replacement for Chris Samuels
Jerome Brown	DT	1990, 1991	Philadelphia Eagles	
Jim Brown	FB	1957, 1958, 1959, 1960, 1961 (NFL), 1962 (NFL), 1963 (NFL), 1964 (NFL), 1965 (NFL)	Cleveland Browns	1961—Named MVP of game 1962—Named MVP of game 1965—Named MVP of game
Josh Brown	K	2015	New York Giants	2015—Selected as a replacement for Stephen Gostkowski
Larry Brown	RB	1969 (NFL), 1970, 1971, 1972	Washington Redskins	
Lomas Brown	OT	1990, 1991, 1992, 1993, 1994, 1995, 1996	Detroit Lions (1990–1995); Arizona Cardinals (1996)	
Mike Brown	S	2005	Chicago Bears	
Orlando Brown	OT	2019, 2020, 2021†, 2022	Baltimore Ravens (2019–2021) Kansas City Chiefs (2022)	2019—Selected as a replacement for Trent Brown
Ray Brown	G	2001	San Francisco 49ers	
Roger Brown	DT	1962 (NFL), 1963 (NFL), 1964 (NFL), 1965 (NFL), 1966 (NFL), 1967 (NFL),	Detroit Lions (1962–1966); Los Angeles Rams (1967)	
Ron Brown	KR	1985	Los Angeles Rams	
Ronnie Brown	RB	2008	Miami Dolphins	
Rosey Brown	OT	1955, 1956, 1957, 1958, 1959, 1960, 1962 (NFL), 1964 (NFL), 1965 (NFL)	New York Giants	
Ruben Brown	G	1996, 1997, 1998, 1999, 2000†, 2001, 2002, 2003, 2006	Buffalo Bills (1996–2003); Chicago Bears (2006)	2006—Selected as a replacement for Shawn Andrews
Tim Brown	KR, WR	1988, 1991, 1993, 1994, 1995, 1996, 1997, 1999, 2001	Los Angeles/Oakland Raiders	
Timothy Brown	HB	1962 (NFL), 1963 (NFL), 1965 (NFL)	Philadelphia Eagles	
Trent Brown	OT	2019‡	Oakland Raiders	2019—Did not play in the Pro Bowl due to injury
Troy Brown	WR	2001	New England Patriots	
Willie Brown	CB	1964 (AFL), 1965 (AFL), 1967 (AFL), 1968 (AFL), 1969 (AFL), 1970, 1971, 1972, 1973	Denver Broncos (1964, 1965); Oakland Raiders (1967–1973)	
Zach Brown	ILB	2016	Buffalo Bills	2016—Selected as a replacement for Dont'a Hightower
Brandon Browner	CB	2011	Seattle Seahawks	2011—Selected as a replacement for Carlos Rogers
Joey Browner	SS	1985, 1986, 1987, 1988, 1989, 1990	Minnesota Vikings	
Isaac Bruce	WR	1996, 1999, 2000†, 2001	St. Louis Rams	
Don Brumm	DE	1968 (NFL)	St. Louis Cardinals	
Mark Brunell	QB	1996, 1997, 1999	Jacksonville Jaguars	
Fred Bruney	DB	1961 (AFL), 1962 (AFL)	Boston Patriots	
Tedy Bruschi	ILB	2004	New England Patriots	
Bobby Bryant	CB	1975, 1976	Minnesota Vikings	
Dez Bryant	WR	2013, 2014, 2016	Dallas Cowboys	2016—Selected as a replacement for Julio Jones
Matt Bryant	K	2016‡	Atlanta Falcons	2016—Did not play in the Pro Bowl because the Falcons advanced to Super Bowl LI
Buck Buchanan	DT	1964 (AFL), 1965 (AFL), 1966 (AFL), 1967 (AFL), 1968 (AFL), 1969 (AFL), 1970, 1971	Kansas City Chiefs	
Ray Buchanan	CB	1998	Atlanta Falcons	
Willie Buchanon	CB	1974, 1978	Green Bay Packers	
DeForest Buckner	DT	2018, 2021†	San Francisco 49ers (2018); Indianapolis Colts (2021)	2018—Selected as a replacement for Fletcher Cox
Ed Budde	G	1963 (AFL), 1966 (AFL), 1967 (AFL), 1968 (AFL), 1969 (AFL), 1970, 1971	Kansas City Chiefs	
Norm Bulaich	RB	1971	Baltimore Colts	
Marc Bulger	QB	2003#, 2006	St. Louis Rams	2003—Named MVP of game
Keith Bulluck	LB	2003	Tennessee Titans	
Frank Buncom	LB	1964 (AFL), 1965 (AFL), 1967 (AFL)	San Diego Chargers	
Nick Buoniconti	MLB	1963 (AFL), 1964 (AFL), 1965 (AFL), 1966 (AFL), 1967 (AFL), 1969 (AFL), 1972, 1973	Boston Patriots (1963–1967); Miami Dolphins (1969, 1972, 1973)	
Vontaze Burfict	ILB	2013	Cincinnati Bengals	
Chris Burford	OE	1961 (AFL)	Dallas Texans	
Derrick Burgess	DE	2005, 2006	Oakland Raiders	
Adrian Burk	QB	1954, 1955	Philadelphia Eagles	
Bobby Burnett	HB	1966 (AFL)	Buffalo Bills	
Rob Burnett	DE	1994	Cleveland Browns	
Brian Burns	DE	2021, 2022†	Carolina Panthers	
Ode Burrell	HB	1965 (AFL)	Houston Oilers	
Ken Burrough	WR	1975, 1977	Houston Oilers	
Joe Burrow	QB	2022	Cincinnati Bengals	
Lloyd Burruss	SS	1986	Kansas City Chiefs	
Jim Burt	NT	1986	New York Giants	
Jermon Bushrod	OT	2011, 2012	New Orleans Saints	2012—Selected as a replacement for Joe Staley
Dick Butkus	MLB	1965 (NFL), 1966 (NFL), 1967 (NFL), 1968 (NFL), 1969 (NFL), 1970, 1971, 1972	Chicago Bears	
Jack Butler	DB	1955, 1956, 1957, 1958	Pittsburgh Steelers	
Jerry Butler	WR	1980	Buffalo Bills	
Jim Butler	RB	1969 (NFL)	Atlanta Falcons	
LeRoy Butler	SS	1993, 1996, 1997, 1998	Green Bay Packers	
Malcolm Butler	CB	2015	New England Patriots	
Marion Butts	RB	1990, 1991	San Diego Chargers	
Dave Butz	DT	1983	Washington Redskins	
Kevin Byard	FS	2017, 2021†	Tennessee Titans	2017—Selected as a replacement for Micah Hyde
Keith Byars	FB	1993	Miami Dolphins	
Earnest Byner	RB	1990, 1991	Washington Redskins	
Butch Byrd	CB	1964 (AFL), 1965 (AFL), 1966 (AFL), 1968 (AFL), 1969 (AFL)	Buffalo Bills	
Gill Byrd	CB	1991, 1992,	San Diego Chargers	
Jairus Byrd	FS	2009‡, 2012, 2013	Buffalo Bills	2009—Did not play in the Pro Bowl due to injury 2012—Selected as a replacement for Ed Reed
