= List of Pro Bowl players, G–H =

The following is a list of players, both past and current, who have been selected to play in the NFL's annual Pro Bowl game, beginning with the 1950 season.

Between 1938 and 1942, an NFL all star team played the league champion in the NFL All-Star Game. Participants in these games are not recognized by the NFL as Pro Bowlers, and they are not included in this list. No games were played between 1943 and 1950.

Between 1961 and 1969, the NFL and AFL played separate all-star games. This list includes players who were selected to play in the American Football League All-Star game during that period.

== G ==
†—Named as a starter ‡—Did not participate (see notes) #—Named Pro Bowl MVP/co-MVP (or equivalent)

Name	Position	Year(s) selected	Franchise(s) represented	Notes
Roman Gabriel	QB	1967 (NFL), 1968 (NFL), 1969 (NFL), 1973	Los Angeles Rams (1967–1969); Philadelphia Eagles (1973)	
Bob Gain	DT	1957, 1958, 1959, 1961 (NFL), 1962 (NFL)	Cleveland Browns	
Willie Galimore	HB	1958	Chicago Bears	
Kendall Gammon	LS	2004	Kansas City Chiefs	
Rich Gannon	QB	1999, 2000, 2001, 2002	Oakland Raiders	2000—Named MVP of game 2001—Named MVP of game
Graham Gano	K	2017	Carolina Panthers	2017—Selected as a replacement for Greg Zuerlein
Jeff Garcia	QB	2000, 2001, 2002, 2007,	San Francisco 49ers (2000–2002); Tampa Bay Buccaneers (2007)	2007—Selected as a replacement for Brett Favre
Sauce Gardner	CB	2022†	New York Jets	
Chris Gardocki	P	1996	Indianapolis Colts	
Charlie Garner	RB	2000	San Francisco 49ers	
David Garrard	QB	2009	Jacksonville Jaguars	
Carl Garrett	RB	1969 (AFL)	Boston Patriots	
Mike Garrett	RB	1966 (AFL), 1967 (AFL)	Kansas City Chiefs	
Myles Garrett	DE	2018†, 2020† 2021†, 2022†	Cleveland Browns	
Gary Garrison	OE, WR	1968 (AFL), 1970, 1971, 1972	San Diego Chargers	
Walt Garrison	RB	1972	Dallas Cowboys	
Larry Garron	RB, KR	1961 (AFL), 1963 (AFL), 1964 (AFL), 1967 (AFL)	Boston Patriots	
Sam Gash	FB	1998, 1999	Buffalo Bills	
Mark Gastineau	DE	1981, 1982, 1983, 1984, 1985	New York Jets	
Antonio Gates	TE	2004, 2005, 2006, 2007‡, 2008, 2009, 2010, 2011	San Diego Chargers	2007—Did not play in the Pro Bowl due to injury
Frank Gatski	C	1956	Cleveland Browns	
Matt Gay	K	2021†‡	Los Angeles Rams	2021—Did not play in the Pro Bowl because the Rams advanced to Super Bowl LVI
William Gay	DE	1982	Detroit Lions	
Shaun Gayle	S	1991	Chicago Bears	
Kabeer Gbaja-Biamila	DE	2003	Green Bay Packers	
Bill George	LB	1954, 1955, 1956, 1957, 1958, 1959, 1960, 1961	Chicago Bears	
Eddie George	RB	1997, 1998, 1999, 2000	Tennessee Oilers (1997, 1998); Tennessee Titans (1999, 2000)	
Roy Gerela	K	1972, 1974	Pittsburgh Steelers	
Joe Geri	HB	1950, 1951	Pittsburgh Steelers	
Jim Gibbons	TE	1960, 1961 (NFL), 1964 (NFL)	Detroit Lions	
Abe Gibron	G	1952, 1953, 1954, 1955	Cleveland Browns	
Frank Gifford	DB, FL	1953, 1955, 1956, 1957, 1958#, 1959, 1963 (NFL)	New York Giants	1958—Named MVP of game
Cookie Gilchrist	FB	1962 (AFL), 1963 (AFL), 1964 (AFL), 1965 (AFL)	Buffalo Bills (1962–1964); Denver Broncos (1965)	
Kline Gilbert	OT	1957	Chicago Bears	
Sean Gilbert	DT	1993	Los Angeles Rams	
Jason Gildon	LB	2000, 2001, 2002	Pittsburgh Steelers	
Jimmie Giles	TE	1980, 1981, 1982, 1985	Tampa Bay Buccaneers	
John Gilliam	WR	1972, 1973, 1974, 1975	Minnesota Vikings	
Jon Gilliam	C	1961 (AFL)	Dallas Texans	
Gale Gillingham	G	1969 (NFL), 1970, 1971, 1973, 1974	Green Bay Packers	
Horace Gillom	P	1952	Cleveland Browns	
Harry Gilmer	QB, HB	1950, 1952	Washington Redskins	
Stephon Gilmore	CB	2016, 2018‡, 2019†, 2020, 2021	Buffalo Bills (2016); New England Patriots (2018–2020) Carolina Panthers (2021)	2016—Selected as a replacement for Marcus Peters; 2018—Did not play in the Pro Bowl because the Patriots advanced to Super Bowl LIII 2021—Selected as a replacement for Jalen Ramsey
Tashaun Gipson	FS	2014	Cleveland Browns	
Ernest Givins	WR	1990, 1992	Houston Oilers	
Bill Glass	DE	1962, 1963, 1964, 1967	Cleveland Browns	
Aaron Glenn	CB	1997, 1998, 2002	New York Jets (1997, 1998); Houston Texans (2002)	
Tarik Glenn	OT	2004, 2005, 2006	Indianapolis Colts	
Terry Glenn	WR	1999	New England Patriots	
Fred Glick	S	1962 (AFL), 1963 (AFL), 1964 (AFL)	Houston Oilers	
Kevin Glover	C	1995, 1996, 1997	Detroit Lions	
La'Roi Glover	DT	2000, 2001, 2002, 2003, 2004, 2005	New Orleans Saints (2000, 2001); Dallas Cowboys (2002-2005)	
Chris Godwin	WR	2019‡	Tampa Bay Buccaneers	2019—Did not play in the Pro Bowl due to injury
George Goeddeke	G	1969 (AFL)	Denver Broncos	
Jared Goff	QB	2017, 2018‡	Los Angeles Rams	2017—Selected as a replacement for Carson Wentz; 2018—Did not play in the Pro Bowl because the Rams advanced to Super Bowl LIII
Kevin Gogan	G	1994, 1997, 1998	Los Angeles Raiders (1994); San Francisco 49ers (1997, 1998)	
Pete Gogolak	K	1965 (AFL)	Buffalo Bills	
Ian Gold	OLB	2001	Denver Broncos	
Dashon Goldson	FS	2011‡, 2012‡	San Francisco 49ers	2011—Did not play in the Pro Bowl due to injury 2012—Did not play in the Pro Bowl because the 49ers advanced to Super Bowl XLVII
Bob Golic	NT	1985, 1986, 1987	Cleveland Browns	
Kenny Golladay	WR	2019	Detroit Lions	2019—Selected as a replacement for Chris Godwin
Goose Gonsoulin	S	1961 (AFL), 1962 (AFL), 1963 (AFL), 1964 (AFL), 1966 (AFL)	Denver Broncos	
Tony Gonzalez	TE	1999, 2000, 2001, 2002, 2003, 2004, 2005, 2006, 2007, 2008, 2010, 2011, 2012, 2013	Kansas City Chiefs (1999-2008); Atlanta Falcons (2010-2013)	
Irv Goode	G	1964, 1967	St. Louis Cardinals	
Rob Goode	RB	1951, 1954	Washington Redskins	
Tom Goode	C	1969 (AFL)	Miami Dolphins	
Jonathan Goodwin	C	2009	New Orleans Saints	2009—Did not play in the Pro Bowl because the Saints advanced to Super Bowl XLIV
Dick Gordon	WR	1970, 1971	Chicago Bears	
Josh Gordon	WR	2013	Cleveland Browns	
Melvin Gordon	RB	2016, 2018	San Diego Chargers	2016—Selected as a replacement for Le'Veon Bell
John Gordy	G	1963 (NFL), 1964 (NFL), 1965 (NFL)	Detroit Lions	
Frank Gore	RB	2006, 2009, 2011‡, 2012‡, 2013	San Francisco 49ers	2009—Selected as a replacement for Steven Jackson; 2011—Did not play in the Pro Bowl due to injury 2012—Did not play in the Pro Bowl because the 49ers advanced to Super Bowl XLVII
Bruce Gossett	K	1966 (NFL), 1968 (NFL)	Los Angeles Rams	
Jeff Gossett	P	1991	Los Angeles Raiders	
Stephen Gostkowski	K	2008, 2013, 2014, 2015	New England Patriots	2014—Did not play in the Pro Bowl because the Patriots advanced to Super Bowl XLIX
Robbie Gould	PK	2006	Chicago Bears	
Randy Gradishar	LB	1975, 1977, 1978, 1979, 1981, 1982, 1983	Denver Broncos	
Brandon Graham	DE	2020†	Philadelphia Eagles	
Corey Graham	ST	2011	Chicago Bears	
Jimmy Graham	TE	2011†, 2013, 2014, 2016, 2017‡	New Orleans Saints (2011, 2013, 2014); Seattle Seahawks (2016, 2017)	2016—Selected as a replacement for Jordan Reed; 2017—Did not play in the Pro Bowl due to injury
Kenny Graham	S	1965 (AFL), 1967 (AFL), 1968 (AFL), 1969 (AFL)	San Diego Chargers	
Otto Graham	QB	1950#, 1951, 1952, 1953, 1954	Cleveland Browns	1950—Named MVP of game
Shayne Graham	K	2005	Cincinnati Bengals	
Martín Gramática	K	2000	Tampa Bay Buccaneers	
Hoyle Granger	RB	1967 (AFL), 1968 (AFL)	Houston Oilers	
Jakeem Grant	KR	2021†	Chicago Bears	
Larry Grantham	LB	1962 (AFL), 1963 (AFL), 1964 (AFL), 1966 (AFL), 1969 (AFL)	New York Titans (1962); New York Jets (1963, 1964, 1966, 1969)	
J. T. Gray	ST	2021†	New Orleans Saints	
Jerry Gray	CB	1986, 1987, 1988, 1989	Los Angeles Rams	1989—Named MVP of game
Ken Gray	OG	1961, 1963, 1964, 1966, 1967, 1968	St. Louis Cardinals	
Leon Gray	T	1976, 1978, 1979, 1981	New England Patriots (1976, 1978); Houston Oilers (1979, 1981)	
Mel Gray	KR	1990, 1991, 1992, 1994	Detroit Lions	
Mel Gray	WR	1974, 1975, 1976, 1977	St. Louis Cardinals	
Dave Grayson	DB	1962 (AFL), 1963 (AFL), 1964 (AFL), 1965 (AFL), 1966 (AFL), 1969 (AFL)	Dallas Texans/Kansas City Chiefs (1962–1964); Oakland Raiders (1965, 1966, 1969)	
Elvis Grbac	QB	2000	Kansas City Chiefs	2000—Selected as a replacement for Steve McNair
A. J. Green	WR	2011†, 2012†, 2013, 2014, 2015 2016‡, 2017‡	Cincinnati Bengals	2016—Did not play in the Pro Bowl due to injury 2017—Did not play in the Pro Bowl due to injury
Ahman Green	RB	2001, 2002, 2003, 2004	Green Bay Packers	
Bobby Joe Green	P	1970	Chicago Bears	
Cornell Green	CB, S	1965, 1966, 1967, 1971, 1972	Dallas Cowboys	
Darrell Green	CB	1984, 1986, 1987, 1990, 1991, 1996, 1997	Washington Redskins	
Eric Green	TE	1993, 1994	Pittsburgh Steelers	
Ernie Green	RB	1966, 1967	Cleveland Browns	
Gary Green	CB	1981, 1982, 1983, 1985	Kansas City Chiefs (1981-1983); Los Angeles Rams (1985)	
Gaston Green	RB	1991	Denver Broncos	
Harold Green	RB	1992	Cincinnati Bengals	
Hugh Green	LB	1982, 1983	Tampa Bay Buccaneers	
Jacob Green	DE	1986, 1987	Seattle Seahawks	
John Green	DE	1950	Philadelphia Eagles	
Roy Green	WR	1983, 1984	St. Louis Cardinals	
Tony Green	KR	1978	Washington Redskins	
Trent Green	QB	2003, 2005	Kansas City Chiefs	
Kevin Greene	LB	1989, 1994, 1995, 1996, 1998	Los Angeles Rams (1989); Pittsburgh Steelers (1994, 1995); Carolina Panthers (1996, 1998)	
Joe Greene	DT	1969, 1970, 1971, 1972, 1973, 1974, 1975, 1976, 1978, 1979	Pittsburgh Steelers	
Tony Greene	S	1977	Buffalo Bills	
Chad Greenway	LB	2011, 2012	Minnesota Vikings	
L. C. Greenwood	DE	1973, 1974, 1975, 1976, 1978, 1979	Pittsburgh Steelers	
Forrest Gregg	OT	1959, 1960, 1961, 1962, 1963, 1964, 1966, 1967, 1968	Green Bay Packers	
Jack Gregory	DE	1969, 1972	Cleveland Browns (1969); New York Giants (1972)	
Jermaine Gresham	TE	2011, 2012	Cincinnati Bengals	
Visco Grgich	G	1950	San Francisco 49ers	
Rosey Grier	DT	1956, 1960	New York Giants	
Bob Griese	QB	1970, 1971, 1973, 1974, 1977, 1978	Miami Dolphins	
Brian Griese	QB	2000	Denver Broncos	
Everson Griffen	DE	2015, 2016†, 2017†‡, 2019	Minnesota Vikings	2015—Selected as a replacement for J. J. Watt; 2017—Did not play in the Pro Bowl due to injury 2019—Selected as a replacement for Nick Bosa
Michael Griffin	SS	2008, 2010	Tennessee Titans	2008—Selected as a replacement for Ed Reed; 2010—Selected as a replacement for Ed Reed
Robert Griffin III	QB	2012‡	Washington Redskins	2012—Did not play in the Pro Bowl due to injury
Shaquill Griffin	CB	2019	Seattle Seahawks	2019—Selected as a replacement for Marshon Lattimore
Robert Griffith	SS	2000	Minnesota Vikings	
Bob Grim	WR	1971	Minnesota Vikings	
Billy Grimes	HB	1950, 1951	Green Bay Packers	
Brent Grimes	CB	2010†, 2013, 2014, 2015	Atlanta Falcons (2010); Miami Dolphins (2013–2015)	2010—Selected as a replacement for Charles Woodson; 2015—Selected as a replacement for Aqib Talib
Russ Grimm	G	1983, 1984, 1985, 1986	Washington Redskins	
John Grimsley	LB	1988	Houston Oilers	
Rob Gronkowski	TE	2011, 2012, 2014‡, 2015‡, 2017‡	New England Patriots	2011—Did not play in the Pro Bowl because the Patriots advanced to Super Bowl XLVI; 2012—Did not play in the Pro Bowl due to injury 2014—Did not play in the Pro Bowl because the Patriots advanced to Super Bowl XLIX; 2015—Did not play in the Pro Bowl due to injury 2017—Did not play in the Pro Bowl because the Patriots advanced to Super Bowl LII
Jerry Groom	DT	1954	Chicago Cardinals	
Jordan Gross	OT	2008†, 2010†, 2013,	Carolina Panthers	2013—Selected as a replacement for Joe Staley
Lou Groza	K, OT	1950, 1951, 1952, 1953, 1954, 1955, 1957, 1958, 1959	Cleveland Browns	
Ben Grubbs	G	2011, 2013,	Baltimore Ravens (2011); New Orleans Saints (2013)	2011—Selected as a replacement for Brian Waters
Tim Grunhard	C	1999	Kansas City Chiefs	1999—Selected as a replacement for Tom Nalen
Bob Grupp	P	1979	Kansas City Chiefs	
Todd Gurley	RB	2015, 2017†, 2018†‡	St. Louis/Los Angeles Rams	2018—Did not play in the Pro Bowl because the Rams advanced to Super Bowl LIII
Andre Gurode	C	2006, 2007†, 2008†, 2009‡, 2010†	Dallas Cowboys	2006—Selected as a replacement for Olin Kreutz; 2009—Did not play in the Pro Bowl due to injury
Ray Guy	P	1973, 1974, 1975, 1976, 1977, 1978, 1980	Oakland Raiders	

== H ==
†—Named as a starter ‡—Did not participate (see notes) #—Named Pro Bowl MVP/co-MVP (or equivalent)

Name	Position	Year(s) selected	Franchise(s) represented	Notes
Dino Hackett	ILB	1988	Kansas City Chiefs	
Wayne Haddix	CB	1990	Tampa Bay Buccaneers	
Joe Haden	CB	2013†, 2014†, 2019	Cleveland Browns (2013, 2014); Pittsburgh Steelers (2019)	1999—Selected as a replacement for Marcus Peters
Pat Haden	QB	1977	Los Angeles Rams	
John Hadl	QB	1964 (AFL), 1965 (AFL), 1968 (AFL), 1969 (AFL), 1972, 1973	San Diego Chargers (1964, 1965, 1968, 1969, 1972); Los Angeles Rams (1973)	
Ali Haji-Sheikh	K	1983	New York Giants	
Charles Haley	OLB, DE	1988, 1990, 1991, 1994, 1995	San Francisco 49ers (1988, 1990, 1991); Dallas Cowboys (1994, 1995)	
Tamba Hali	LB	2010, 2011, 2012, 2013, 2014, 2015	Kansas City Chiefs	
Dante Hall	RS	2002, 2003	Kansas City Chiefs	
DeAngelo Hall	DB	2005, 2006, 2010	Atlanta Falcons (2005, 2006); Washington Redskins (2010)	
Ron Hall	DB	1963 (AFL)	Boston Patriots	
C. J. Ham	FB	2019	Minnesota Vikings	2019—Selected as a replacement for Kyle Juszczyk
Jack Ham	LB	1973, 1974, 1975, 1976, 1977, 1978, 1979, 1980	Pittsburgh Steelers	
Ken Hamlin	FS	2007	Dallas Cowboys	
Casey Hampton	NT	2003, 2005, 2006, 2007, 2009	Pittsburgh Steelers	
Dan Hampton	DE, DT	1980, 1982, 1984, 1985	Chicago Bears	
Rodney Hampton	RB	1992, 1993	New York Giants	
Chris Hanburger	LB	1966, 1967, 1968, 1969, 1972, 1973, 1974, 1975, 1976	Washington Redskins	
Merton Hanks	S	1994, 1995, 1996, 1997	San Francisco 49ers	
John Hannah	G	1976, 1978, 1979, 1980, 1981, 1982, 1983, 1984, 1985	New England Patriots	
Dave Hanner	DT	1953, 1954	Green Bay Packers	
Brian Hansen	P	1984	New Orleans Saints	
Chris Hanson	P	2002	Jacksonville Jaguars	
Jason Hanson	PK	1997, 1999	Detroit Lions	
Jim Harbaugh	QB	1995	Indianapolis Colts	
Justin Hardee	ST	2022†	New York Jets	
Pat Harder	FB	1950, 1952	Chicago Cardinals (1950); Detroit Lions (1952)	
Cedrick Hardman	DE	1971, 1975	San Francisco 49ers	
Mecole Hardman	KR	2019‡	Kansas City Chiefs	2019—Did not play in the Pro Bowl because the Chiefs advanced to Super Bowl LIV
Nick Hardwick	C	2006	San Diego Chargers	
Greg Hardy	DE	2013	Carolina Panthers	
Jim Hardy	QB	1950	Chicago Cardinals	
Kevin Hardy	LB	1999	Jacksonville Jaguars	
Javon Hargrave	DT	2021	Philadelphia Eagles	2021—Selected as a replacement for Kenny Clark
Ronnie Harmon	RB	1992	San Diego Chargers	
Roman Harper	SS	2009‡, 2010	New Orleans Saints	2009—Selected as a replacement for Adrian Wilson, did not play in the Pro Bowl because the Saints advanced to Super Bowl XLIV; 2010—Selected as a replacement for Nick Collins
Dennis Harrah	G	1978, 1979, 1980, 1985, 1986, 1987	Los Angeles Rams	
Al Harris	CB	2007, 2008	Green Bay Packers	2008—Selected as a replacement for Asante Samuel
Chris Harris Jr.	CB	2014, 2015‡, 2016, 2018	Denver Broncos	2015—Did not play in the Pro Bowl because the Broncos advanced to Super Bowl 50
Clark Harris	LS	2017	Cincinnati Bengals	
Cliff Harris	S	1974, 1975, 1976, 1977, 1978, 1979	Dallas Cowboys	
Deonte Harris	KR	2019	New Orleans Saints	
Dick Harris	DB	1960 (AFL), 1962 (AFL)	Los Angeles Chargers (1960); San Diego Chargers (1962)	
Dwayne Harris	ST	2016	New York Giants	
Franco Harris	FB	1972, 1973, 1974, 1975, 1976, 1977, 1978, 1979, 1980	Pittsburgh Steelers	
James Harris	QB	1974	Los Angeles Rams	
Josh Harris	LS	2021†	Atlanta Falcons	
Najee Harris	RB	2021†	Pittsburgh Steelers	2021—Selected as a replacement for Joe Mixon
Tim Harris	OLB	1989	Green Bay Packers	
Tommie Harris	DT	2005, 2006‡, 2007	Chicago Bears	2006—Did not play in the Pro Bowl due to injury 2007—Did not play in the Pro Bowl due to injury
Walt Harris	CB	2006	San Francisco 49ers	2006—Selected as a replacement for Lito Sheppard
Dennis Harrison	DE	1982	Philadelphia Eagles	
James Harrison	OLB	2007, 2008, 2009, 2010, 2011	Pittsburgh Steelers	2010—Did not play in the Pro Bowl because the Steelers advanced to Super Bowl XLV
Marvin Harrison	WR	1999, 2000, 2001, 2002, 2003, 2004, 2005, 2006	Indianapolis Colts	
Rodney Harrison	S	1998, 2001	San Diego Chargers	
Jim Hart	QB	1974, 1975, 1976, 1977	St. Louis Cardinals	
Leon Hart	E	1951	Detroit Lions	
Tommy Hart	DE	1976	San Francisco 49ers	
Jeff Hartings	C	2004, 2005	Pittsburgh Steelers	
Ken Harvey	LB	1994, 1995, 1996, 1997	Washington Redskins	
Percy Harvin	WR	2009	Minnesota Vikings	
Carlton Haselrig	G	1992	Pittsburgh Steelers	
Matt Hasselbeck	QB	2003, 2005, 2007	Seattle Seahawks	
James Hasty	CB	1997, 1999	Kansas City Chiefs	
Dale Hatcher	P	1985	Los Angeles Rams	
Jason Hatcher	DE	2013	Dallas Cowboys	
Len Hauss	C	1966, 1968, 1969, 1970, 1972	Washington Redskins	
Rip Hawkins	LB	1963	Minnesota Vikings	
Wayne Hawkins	OG	1963 (AFL), 1964 (AFL), 1965 (AFL), 1966 (AFL), 1967 (AFL)	Oakland Raiders	
Bob Hayes	WR	1965, 1966, 1967	Dallas Cowboys	
Lester Hayes	CB	1980, 1981, 1982, 1983, 1984	Oakland Raiders (1980, 1981); Los Angeles Raiders (1982-1984)	
Abner Haynes	RB	1960 (AFL), 1961 (AFL), 1962 (AFL), 1964 (AFL)	Dallas Texans (1960-1962); Kansas City Chiefs (1964)	
Mark Haynes	CB	1982, 1983, 1984	New York Giants	
Mike Haynes	CB	1976, 1977, 1978, 1979, 1980, 1982, 1984, 1985, 1986	New England Patriots (1976-1980, 1982); Los Angeles Raiders (1984-1986)	
Albert Haynesworth	DT	2007†, 2008†	Tennessee Titans	
Casey Hayward	CB	2016†, 2017	San Diego/Los Angeles Chargers	
Matt Hazeltine	LB	1962 (NFL), 1964 (NFL)	San Francisco 49ers	
Sherrill Headrick	LB	1961 (AFL), 1962 (AFL), 1965 (AFL), 1966 (AFL)	Dallas Texans/Kansas City Chiefs	
Todd Heap	TE	2002, 2003	Baltimore Ravens	
Garrison Hearst	RB	1998, 2001	San Francisco 49ers	
Bobby Hebert	QB	1993	Atlanta Falcons	
Johnny Hekker	P	2013, 2015, 2016†, 2017†	St. Louis/Los Angeles Rams	
E. J. Henderson	MLB	2010	Minnesota Vikings	2010—Selected as a replacement for Brian Urlacher
John Henderson	DT	2004, 2006	Jacksonville Jaguars	2006—Selected as a replacement for Richard Seymour
Thomas Henderson	LB	1978	Dallas Cowboys	
William Henderson	FB	2004	Green Bay Packers	
Ted Hendricks	LB	1971, 1972, 1973, 1974, 1980, 1981, 1982, 1983	Baltimore Colts (1971–1973); Green Bay Packers (1974); Oakland/Los Angeles Raiders (1980–1983)	
Trey Hendrickson	DE	2021‡, 2022	Cincinnati Bengals	2021—Did not play in the Pro Bowl because the Bengals advanced to Super Bowl LVI
Ed Henke	DE	1952	San Francisco 49ers	
Charlie Hennigan	FL	1961 (AFL), 1962 (AFL), 1963 (AFL), 1964 (AFL), 1965 (AFL)	Houston Oilers	
Derrick Henry	RB	2019, 2020†, 2022	Tennessee Titans	
Travis Henry	RB	2002	Buffalo Bills	
Wally Henry	KR	1979	Philadelphia Eagles	
Craig Hentrich	P	1998, 2003	Tennessee Oilers/Titans	
Justin Herbert	QB	2021†	Los Angeles Chargers	
Dave Herman	G	1968 (AFL), 1969 (AFL)	New York Jets	
Efren Herrera	K	1977	Dallas Cowboys	
Devin Hester	KR	2006, 2007, 2010, 2014	Chicago Bears (2006, 2007, 2010); Atlanta Falcons (2014)	
Cameron Heyward	DE, DT	2017, 2018, 2019, 2020†, 2021	Pittsburgh Steelers	2017—Selected as a replacement for Khalil Mack
Craig Heyward	FB	1995	Atlanta Falcons	
Gene Hickerson	G	1965 (NFL), 1966 (NFL), 1967 (NFL), 1968 (NFL) 1969 (NFL), 1970	Cleveland Browns	
Akiem Hicks	DT	2018	Chicago Bears	
Dwight Hicks	S	1981, 1982, 1983, 1984	San Francisco 49ers	
W. K. Hicks	DB	1966 (AFL)	Houston Oilers	
Dont'a Hightower	ILB	2016‡, 2019‡	New England Patriots	2016—Did not play in the Pro Bowl because the Patriots advanced to Super Bowl LI; 2019—Did not play in the Pro Bowl due to injury
Jay Hilgenberg	C	1985, 1986, 1987, 1988, 1989, 1990, 1991	Chicago Bears	
Joel Hilgenberg	C	1992	New Orleans Saints	
Calvin Hill	RB	1969, 1972, 1973, 1974	Dallas Cowboys	
David Hill	TE	1978, 1979	Detroit Lions	
Drew Hill	WR	1988, 1990	Houston Oilers	
Harlon Hill	E	1954, 1955, 1956	Chicago Bears	
J. D. Hill	WR	1972	Buffalo Bills	
Jimmy Hill	CB	1960, 1961, 1962	St. Louis Cardinals	
Kent Hill	OG	1980, 1982, 1983, 1984, 1985	Los Angeles Rams	
Mack Lee Hill	FB	1964 (AFL)	Kansas City Chiefs	
Tony Hill	WR	1978, 1979, 1985	Dallas Cowboys	
Tyreek Hill	KR, WR	2016†, 2017†, 2018†, 2019‡, 2020†, 2021†, 2022†	Kansas City Chiefs (2016-2021) Miami Dolphins (2022)	2019—Did not play in the Pro Bowl because the Chiefs advanced to Super Bowl LIV
Winston Hill	OT	1964 (AFL), 1967 (AFL), 1968 (AFL), 1969 (AFL), 1970, 1971, 1972, 1973	New York Jets	
Dalton Hilliard	RB	1989	New Orleans Saints	
T. Y. Hilton	WR	2014, 2015, 2016†, 2017	Indianapolis Colts	2015—Selected as a replacement for Larry Fitzgerald; 2017—Selected as a replacement for A. J. Green
Glen Ray Hines	T	1968 (AFL), 1969 (AFL)	Houston Oilers	
Chris Hinton	OT	1983, 1985, 1986, 1987, 1988, 1989, 1991	Baltimore Colts (1983); Indianapolis Colts (1985-1989); Atlanta Falcons (1991)	
Elroy Hirsch	E	1951, 1952, 1953	Los Angeles Rams	
Fred Hoaglin	C	1969	Cleveland Browns	
Dick Hoak	RB	1968 (NFL)	Pittsburgh Steelers	
Leroy Hoard	FB	1994	Cleveland Browns	
John Hock	G	1956	Los Angeles Rams	
T. J. Hockenson	TE	2020†, 2022	Detroit Lions (2020) Minnesota Vikings (2022)	
Dick Hoerner	RB	1950	Los Angeles Rams	
Robert Hoernschemeyer	RB	1951, 1952	Detroit Lions	
John Hoffman	RB	1953, 1955	Chicago Bears	
Mike Hollis	PK	1997	Jacksonville Jaguars	
Brian Holloway	OL	1983, 1984, 1985	New England Patriots	
Rodney Holman	TE	1988, 1989, 1990	Cincinnati Bengals	
Pat Holmes	DL	1967 (AFL), 1968 (AFL)	Houston Oilers	
Priest Holmes	RB	2001, 2002, 2003	Kansas City Chiefs	
Robert Holmes	RB	1969 (AFL)	Kansas City Chiefs	
Pierce Holt	DE	1992	San Francisco 49ers	
Torry Holt	WR	2000, 2001, 2003, 2004, 2005, 2006‡, 2007	St. Louis Rams	2006—Did not play in the Pro Bowl due to injury
E. J. Holub	LB	1961 (AFL), 1962 (AFL), 1964 (AFL), 1965 (AFL), 1966 (AFL)	Dallas Texans/Kansas City Chiefs	
Austin Hooper	TE	2018, 2019	Atlanta Falcons	2018—Selected as a replacement for Zach Ertz; 2019—Selected as a replacement for George Kittle
Chris Hope	SS	2008	Tennessee Titans	
Brad Hopkins	OT	2000, 2003	Tennessee Titans	
DeAndre Hopkins	WR	2015, 2017†‡, 2018†‡, 2019†‡, 2020†	Houston Texans (2015, 2017–2019); Arizona Cardinals (2020)	2017—Did not play in the Pro Bowl due to injury 2018—Did not play in the Pro Bowl due to injury 2019—Did not play in the Pro Bowl due to injury
Wes Hopkins	S	1985	Philadelphia Eagles	
Mike Horan	P	1988	Denver Broncos	
Joe Horn	WR	2000, 2001, 2002, 2004	New Orleans Saints	
Paul Hornung	HB	1959, 1960	Green Bay Packers	
Ethan Horton	TE	1991	Los Angeles Raiders	
Jeff Hostetler	QB	1994	Los Angeles Raiders	
T. J. Houshmandzadeh	WR	2007	Cincinnati Bengals	
Jim Houston	LB	1964, 1965, 1969, 1970	Cleveland Browns	
Justin Houston	DE	2012, 2013, 2014, 2015	Kansas City Chiefs	
Ken Houston	S	1968, 1969, 1970, 1971, 1972, 1973, 1974, 1975, 1976, 1977, 1978, 1979	Houston Oilers (1968-1972); Washington Redskins (1973-1979)	
Desmond Howard	KR	2000	Detroit Lions	
Erik Howard	DT	1990	New York Giants	
Jordan Howard	RB	2016	Chicago Bears	
Xavien Howard	CB	2018†, 2020†, 2021†, 2022	Miami Dolphins	
Chuck Howley	LB	1965 (NFL), 1966 (NFL), 1967 (NFL), 1968 (NFL), 1969 (NFL), 1971	Dallas Cowboys	
Billy Howton	OE	1952, 1955, 1956, 1957	Green Bay Packers	
Marv Hubbard	FB	1971, 1972, 1973	Oakland Raiders	
Brad Hubbert	RB	1967 (AFL)	San Diego Chargers	
Kevin Huber	P	2014	Cincinnati Bengals	
Bill Hudson	DT	1961 (AFL)	San Diego Chargers	
Dick Hudson	OT	1965 (AFL)	Buffalo Bills	
Rodney Hudson	C	2016†, 2017, 2019	Oakland Raiders	
Talanoa Hufanga	SS	2022	San Francisco 49ers	
Sam Huff	MLB	1958, 1959, 1960#, 1961 (NFL), 1964 (NFL)	New York Giants (1958–1961); Washington Redskins (1964)	1960—Named Outstanding Lineman of game
Dick Huffman	OT	1950	Los Angeles Rams	
George Hughes	G, OT	1951, 1953	Pittsburgh Steelers	
Tyrone Hughes	KR	1993	New Orleans Saints	
Kent Hull	C	1988, 1989, 1990	Buffalo Bills	
Weldon Humble	G	1950	Cleveland Browns	
Bobby Humphrey	RB	1990	Denver Broncos	
Claude Humphrey	DE	1970, 1971, 1972, 1973, 1974, 1977	Atlanta Falcons	
Creed Humphrey	C	2022†	Kansas City Chiefs	
Marlon Humphrey	CB	2019, 2020, 2022	Baltimore Ravens	
D. J. Humphries	OT	2021	Arizona Cardinals	2021—Selected as a replacement for Tyron Smith
Bobby Hunt	DB	1964 (AFL)	Kansas City Chiefs	
Jim Lee Hunt	DT	1961 (AFL), 1966 (AFL), 1967 (AFL), 1969 (AFL)	New England Patriots	
Kareem Hunt	RB	2017	Kansas City Chiefs	
Art Hunter	C	1959	Cleveland Browns	
Danielle Hunter	DE	2018, 2019	Minnesota Vikings	
Jalen Hurts	QB	2022†	Philadelphia Eagles	
Ed Husmann	DT	1961 (AFL), 1962 (AFL), 1963 (AFL)	Houston Oilers	
Steve Hutchinson	G	2003, 2004, 2005, 2006, 2007†, 2008†, 2009†,	Seattle Seahawks (2003–2005); Minnesota Vikings (2005–2009)	
Micah Hyde	SS	2017‡	Buffalo Bills	2017—Did not play in the Pro Bowl due to injury
