= List of Pro Bowl players, N–R =

The following is a list of players, both past and current, who have been selected to play in the NFL's annual Pro Bowl game, beginning with the 1950 season.

Between 1938 and 1942, an NFL all star team played the league champion in the NFL All-Star Game. Participants in these games are not recognized by the NFL as Pro Bowlers, and they are not included in this list. No games were played between 1943 and 1950.

Between 1961 and 1969, the NFL and AFL played separate all-star games. This list includes players who were selected to play in the American Football League All-Star game during that period.

== N ==
†—Named as a starter ‡—Did not participate (see notes) #—Named Pro Bowl MVP/co-MVP (or equivalent)

Name	Position	Year(s) selected	Franchise(s) represented	Notes
Gern Nagler	OE	1958	Chicago Cardinals	
Tom Nalen	C	1997, 1998, 1999, 2000‡, 2003	Denver Broncos	2000—Did not play in the Pro Bowl due to injury
Joe Namath	QB	1965 (AFL)#, 1967 (AFL)#, 1968 (AFL), 1969 (AFL), 1972	New York Jets	
Jim Nance	FB	1966 (AFL), 1967 (AFL)	Boston Patriots	
Joe Nash	NT	1984	Seattle Seahawks	
Paul Naumoff	LB	1970	Detroit Lions	
Ed Neal	C	1950	Green Bay Packers	
Keanu Neal	SS	2017	Atlanta Falcons	2017—Selected as a replacement for Malcolm Jenkins
Lorenzo Neal	FB	2002, 2005, 2006, 2007	Cincinnati Bengals (2002); San Diego Chargers (2005–2007)	
Ralph Neely	OT	1967 (NFL), 1969 (NFL)	Dallas Cowboys	
Billy Neighbors	G	1963 (AFL)	Boston Patriots	
Mike Nelms	KR	1980, 1981, 1982	Washington Redskins	
Bill Nelsen	QB	1969 (NFL)	Cleveland Browns	
Andy Nelson	S	1960	Baltimore Colts	
Jordy Nelson	WR	2014	Green Bay Packers	
Quenton Nelson	G	2018, 2019†, 2020†, 2021†‡, 2022†	Indianapolis Colts	2021—Did not play in the Pro Bowl due to injury
Reggie Nelson	FS	2015‡, 2016†	Cincinnati Bengals (2015); Oakland Raiders (2016)	2015—Did not play in the Pro Bowl due to injury
Steve Nelson	ILB	1980, 1984, 1985	New England Patriots	
Tom Neville	OT	1966 (AFL)	Boston Patriots	
Jeremy Newberry	C	2001, 2002	San Francisco 49ers	
Tom Newberry	G	1988, 1989	Los Angeles Rams	
Ed Newman	G	1981, 1982, 1983, 1984	Miami Dolphins	
Terence Newman	CB	2007, 2009†	Dallas Cowboys	2009—Selected as a replacement for Dominique Rodgers-Cromartie
Ozzie Newsome	TE	1981, 1984, 1985	Cleveland Browns	
Cam Newton	QB	2011, 2015‡	Carolina Panthers	2011—Selected as a replacement for Eli Manning; 2015—Did not play in the Pro Bowl because the Panthers advanced to Super Bowl 50
Nate Newton	G	1992, 1993, 1994, 1995, 1996, 1998	Dallas Cowboys	
Yannick Ngakoue	DE	2017	Jacksonville Jaguars	2017—Selected as a replacement for Calais Campbell
Haloti Ngata	DT	2009†, 2010†, 2011‡, 2012‡, 2013‡	Baltimore Ravens	2011—Did not play in the Pro Bowl due to injury 2012—Did not play in the Pro Bowl because the Ravens advanced to Super Bowl XLVII; 2013—Did not play in the Pro Bowl for personal reasons
Elbie Nickel	OE	1952, 1953, 1956	Pittsburgh Steelers	
Hardy Nickerson	MLB	1993, 1996, 1997, 1998, 1999	Tampa Bay Buccaneers	
Carl Nicks	G	2010, 2011†	New Orleans Saints	
Laurie Niemi	DT, OT	1951, 1952	Washington Redskins	
John Niland	G	1968 (NFL), 1969 (NFL), 1970, 1971, 1972, 1973	Dallas Cowboys	
John Nisby	G	1959, 1961 (NFL), 1962 (NFL)	Pittsburgh Steelers (1959, 1961); Washington Redskins (1962)	
Ray Nitschke	MLB	1964 (NFL)	Green Bay Packers	
Roosevelt Nix	FB	2017	Pittsburgh Steelers	2017—Selected as a replacement for James Develin
Tommy Nobis	MLB	1966 (NFL), 1967 (NFL), 1968 (NFL), 1970, 1972	Atlanta Falcons	
Leo Nomellini	OT, DT	1950, 1951, 1952, 1953 1956, 1957, 1958, 1959, 1960, 1961 (NFL)	San Francisco 49ers	
Karl Noonan	OE	1968 (AFL)	Miami Dolphins	
Josh Norman	CB	2015	Carolina Panthers	2015–Did not play in the Pro Bowl because the Panthers advanced to Super Bowl 50
Don Norton	E	1961 (AFL), 1962 (AFL)	San Diego Chargers	
Jerry Norton	LS	1957, 1958, 1959, 1960, 1961	Philadelphia Eagles (1957, 1958); Chicago Cardinals (1959); St. Louis Cardinals (1960, 1961)	
Jim Norton	S	1962 (AFL), 1963 (AFL) 1967 (AFL)	Houston Oilers	
Ken Norton Jr.	ILB	1993, 1995, 1997	Dallas Cowboys (1993); San Francisco 49ers (1995, 1997)	
Scott Norwood	K	1988	Buffalo Bills	
Jay Novacek	TE	1991, 1992, 1993, 1994, 1995	Dallas Cowboys	
Buzz Nutter	C	1962	Pittsburgh Steelers	
Blaine Nye	G	1974, 1976	Dallas Cowboys	

== O ==
†—Named as a starter ‡—Did not participate (see notes) #—Named Pro Bowl MVP/co-MVP (or equivalent)

Name	Position	Year(s) selected	Franchise(s) represented	Notes
Don Oakes	OT	1967 (AFL)	Boston Patriots	
Bart Oates	C	1990, 1991, 1993, 1994, 1995	New York Giants (1990, 1992, 1993); San Francisco 49ers (1994, 1995)	
Ken O'Brien	QB	1985, 1991	New York Jets	1985—Selected as a replacement for Dan Marino
Tommy O'Connell	QB	1957	Cleveland Browns	
Steve Odom	KR	1975	Green Bay Packers	
Nate Odomes	CB	1992, 1993	Buffalo Bills	
Riley Odoms	TE	1973, 1974, 1975, 1978	Denver Broncos	
Joe O'Donnell	G	1965 (AFL)	Buffalo Bills	
Neil O'Donnell	QB	1992	Pittsburgh Steelers	
John Offerdahl	ILB	1986, 1987, 1988, 1989, 1990	Miami Dolphins	
Jonathan Ogden	OT	1997, 1998, 1999, 2000, 2001, 2002, 2003, 2004, 2005, 2006‡, 2007‡	Baltimore Ravens	2006—Did not play in the Pro Bowl due to injury 2007—Did not play in the Pro Bowl due to injury
Adewale Ogunleye	DE	2003	Miami Dolphins	
Shaun O'Hara	C	2008, 2009†, 2010‡	New York Giants	2010—Did not play in the Pro Bowl due to injury
Christian Okoye	FB	1989, 1991	Kansas City Chiefs	
Russell Okung	OT	2012, 2017	Seattle Seahawks (2012); Los Angeles Chargers (2017)	2017—Selected as a replacement for Donald Penn
Greg Olsen	TE	2014, 2015, 2016	Carolina Panthers	2015—Did not play in the Pro Bowl because the Panthers advanced to Super Bowl 50
Merlin Olsen	DT	1962, 1963, 1964, 1965, 1966, 1967, 1968, 1969, 1970, 1971, 1972, 1973, 1974, 1975	Los Angeles Rams	
Harold Olson	T	1961 (AFL)	Buffalo Bills	
Johnny Olszewski	FB	1953, 1955	Chicago Cardinals	
Deltha O'Neal	CB	2001, 2005	Denver Broncos (2001); Cincinnati Bengals (2005)	
Leslie O'Neal	OLB, DE	1989, 1990, 1992, 1993, 1994, 1995	San Diego Chargers	
Brian O'Neill	T	2021	Minnesota Vikings	2021—Selected as a replacement for Tristan Wirfs
Brian Orakpo	OLB	2009, 2010, 2013, 2016	Washington Redskins (2009, 2010, 2013); Tennessee Titans (2016)	
Jimmy Orr	WR	1959, 1965	Pittsburgh Steelers (1959); Baltimore Colts (1965)	
Dave Osborn	RB	1970	Minnesota Vikings	
Kelechi Osemele	G	2016†, 2017†	Oakland Raiders	
Kassim Osgood	ST	2006, 2007, 2009	San Diego Chargers	
Jim Otis	RB	1975	St. Louis Cardinals	
Tyler Ott	LS	2020	Seattle Seahawks	
Gus Otto	LB	1969 (AFL)	Oakland Raiders	
Jim Otto	C	1970, 1971, 1972	Oakland Raiders	
Matt Overton	LS	2013	Indianapolis Colts	
Montell Owens	FB	2010, 2011	Jacksonville Jaguars	
Steve Owens	RB	1971	Detroit Lions	
Terrell Owens	WR	2000, 2001, 2002, 2003, 2004, 2007	San Francisco 49ers (2000–2003); Philadelphia Eagles (2004); Dallas Cowboys (2007)	

== P ==
†—Named as a starter ‡—Did not participate (see notes) #—Named Pro Bowl MVP/co-MVP (or equivalent)

Name	Position	Year(s) selected	Franchise(s) represented	Notes
Orlando Pace	T	1999, 2000, 2001, 2002, 2003, 2004, 2005	St. Louis Rams	
Alan Page	DT	1968, 1969, 1970, 1971, 1972, 1973, 1974, 1975, 1976	Minnesota Vikings	
Carson Palmer	QB	2005, 2006, 2015	Cincinnati Bengals (2005, 2006); Arizona Cardinals (2015)	2006—Named MVP of game
John Paluck	DE	1965	Washington Redskins	
Ken Panfil	T	1959	Chicago Cardinals	
Jack Pardee	LLB	1963	Los Angeles Rams	
Babe Parilli	QB	1963 (AFL), 1964 (AFL), 1966 (AFL)#	Boston Patriots	
Jim Parker	OT, G	1958, 1959, 1960, 1961, 1962, 1963, 1964, 1965	Baltimore Colts	
Willie Parker	RB	2006, 2007	Pittsburgh Steelers	
Cody Parkey	PK	2014	Philadelphia Eagles	
Dave Parks	WR	1965, 1966, 1967	San Francisco 49ers	
Bernie Parrish	DB	1960, 1963 (NFL)	Cleveland Browns	
Lemar Parrish	CB, KR	1970, 1971, 1974, 1975, 1976, 1977, 1979, 1980	Cincinnati Bengals (1970, 1971, 1974–1977); Washington Redskins (1979, 1980)	
Micah Parsons	LB	2021†, 2022†	Dallas Cowboys	
Dan Pastorini	QB	1975	Houston Oilers	
Cordarrelle Patterson	KR, ST	2013, 2016†, 2019†, 2020†	Minnesota Vikings (2013, 2016); Chicago Bears (2019, 2020)	
Jimmy Patton	S	1958, 1959, 1960, 1961, 1962	New York Giants	
Don Paul	DB	1953, 1956, 1957, 1958	Chicago Cardinals (1953); Cleveland Browns (1956–1958)	
Dainard Paulson	DB	1964 (AFL), 1965 (AFL)	New York Jets	
Bryce Paup	LB	1994, 1995, 1996, 1997	Green Bay Packers (1994); Buffalo Bills (1995–1997)	
Walter Payton	RB	1976, 1977#, 1978, 1979, 1980, 1983, 1984, 1985, 1986	Chicago Bears	
Dave Pear	NT	1978	Tampa Bay Buccaneers	
Drew Pearson	WR	1974, 1976, 1977	Dallas Cowboys	
Andrus Peat	G	2018, 2019, 2020	New Orleans Saints	2018—Selected as a replacement for Brandon Brooks; 2019—Selected as a replacement for Brandon Scherff
Cedric Peerman	ST	2015	Cincinnati Bengals	2015—Selected as a replacement for Matthew Slater
Donald Penn	OT	2010, 2016‡, 2017‡	Tampa Bay Buccaneers (2010); Oakland Raiders (2016, 2017)	2010—Selected as a replacement for Chad Clifton; 2016—Did not play in the Pro Bowl due to injury 2017—Did not play in the Pro Bowl due to injury
Woody Peoples	G	1972, 1973	San Francisco 49ers	
Julius Peppers	DE, OLB	2004, 2005, 2006, 2008†, 2009†, 2010†, 2011, 2012†, 2015	Carolina Panthers (2004–2016, 2009); Chicago Bears (2010–2012); Green Bay Packers (2015)	2011—Selected as a replacement for Jason Pierre-Paul; 2015—Selected as a replacement for Von Miller
Don Perkins	FB	1961, 1962, 1963, 1966, 1967, 1968	Dallas Cowboys	
Joe Perry	FB	1952, 1953, 1954	San Francisco 49ers	
Michael Dean Perry	DT	1989, 1990, 1991, 1993, 1994, 1996	Cleveland Browns (1989–1991, 1993, 1994); Denver Broncos (1996)	
Rod Perry	CB	1978, 1980	Los Angeles Rams	
Denzel Perryman	LB	2021	Las Vegas Raiders	
Floyd Peters	DT	1964, 1966, 1967	Philadelphia Eagles	
Jason Peters	OT	2007‡, 2008‡, 2009†, 2010‡, 2011†, 2013‡, 2014‡, 2015‡, 2016‡	Buffalo Bills (2007, 2008); Philadelphia Eagles (2009–2011, 2013–2016)	2007—Did not play in the Pro Bowl due to injury 2008—Did not play in the Pro Bowl due to injury 2010—Did not play in the Pro Bowl due to injury 2013—Did not play in the Pro Bowl due to injury 2014—Did not play in the Pro Bowl due to injury 2015—Did not play in the Pro Bowl due to injury 2016—Did not play in the Pro Bowl due to injury
Marcus Peters	CB	2015, 2016‡, 2019‡	Kansas City Chiefs (2015, 2016); Baltimore Ravens (2019)	2016—Did not play in the Pro Bowl due to injury 2019—Did not play in the Pro Bowl due to injury
Tony Peters	SS	1982	Washington Redskins	
Volney Peters	DT	1955	Washington Redskins	
Adrian Peterson	RB	2007†#, 2008†, 2009†, 2010, 2012†, 2013‡, 2015	Minnesota Vikings	2007—Named MVP of game 2013—Did not play in the Pro Bowl due to injury
Julian Peterson	LB	2002, 2003, 2006, 2007†, 2008	San Francisco 49ers (2002, 2003); Seattle Seahawks (2006–2008)	2008—Selected as a replacement for Derrick Brooks
Patrick Peterson	KR, CB	2011, 2012, 2013, 2014, 2015‡, 2016†, 2017†, 2018†	Arizona Cardinals	2015—Did not play in the Pro Bowl due to injury
Richie Petitbon	S	1962 (NFL), 1963 (NFL), 1966 (NFL), 1967 (NFL)	Chicago Bears	
Gerry Philbin	DE	1968 (AFL), 1969 (AFL)	New York Jets	
Adrian Phillips	ST	2018†	Los Angeles Chargers	
Jim Phillips	OE	1960, 1961 (NFL), 1962 (NFL)	Los Angeles Rams	
Shaun Phillips	OLB	2010	San Diego Chargers	2010—Selected as a replacement for James Harrison
Carl Pickens	WR	1995, 1996	Cincinnati Bengals	
Antonio Pierce	MLB	2006	New York Giants	
Jason Pierre-Paul	DE, OLB	2011, 2012†, 2020	New York Giants (2011, 2012); Tampa Bay Buccaneers (2020)	2011—Did not play in the Pro Bowl because the Giants advanced to Super Bowl XLVI
Nick Pietrosante	FB	1960, 1961	Detroit Lions	
Pete Pihos	TE	1950, 1951, 1952, 1953, 1954, 1955	Philadelphia Eagles	
Kyle Pitts	TE	2021	Atlanta Falcons	
Scott Player	P	2000	Arizona Cardinals	
Milt Plum	QB	1960, 1961	Cleveland Browns	
Jake Plummer	QB	2005	Denver Broncos	
Sherman Plunkett	OT	1964 (AFL), 1966 (AFL)	New York Jets	
Dontari Poe	NT	2013, 2014	Kansas City Chiefs	
Jim Podoley	HB	1957	Washington Redskins	
Troy Polamalu	S	2004, 2005, 2006, 2007, 2008, 2010, 2011, 2013	Pittsburgh Steelers	2010—Did not play in the Pro Bowl because the Steelers advanced to Super Bowl XLV
Tony Pollard	RB	2022	Dallas Cowboys	
Fran Polsfoot	E	1951	Chicago Cardinals	
Ryan Pontbriand	LS	2007, 2008	Cleveland Browns	
Ray Poole	E	1950	New York Giants	
Robert Porcher	DE	1997, 1999, 2001	Detroit Lions	
Joey Porter	LB	2002, 2004, 2005, 2008	Pittsburgh Steelers (2002, 2004, 2005); Miami Dolphins (2008)	
Rufus Porter	LB	1988, 1989	Seattle Seahawks	
Clinton Portis	RB	2003, 2008	Denver Broncos (2003); Washington Redskins (2008)	
Paul Posluszny	LB	2013	Jacksonville Jaguars	
Dickie Post	RB	1967 (AFL), 1969 (AFL)	San Diego Chargers	
Myron Pottios	MLB	1961 (NFL), 1963 (NFL), 1964 (NFL)	Pittsburgh Steelers	
Maurkice Pouncey	C	2010‡, 2011‡, 2012†, 2014, 2016‡, 2017†, 2018†, 2019†‡, 2020†	Pittsburgh Steelers	2010—Did not play in the Pro Bowl because the Steelers advanced to Super Bowl XLV; 2011—Did not play in the Pro Bowl due to injury 2016—Did not play in the Pro Bowl due to injury 2019—Did not play in the Pro Bowl due to injury
Mike Pouncey	C	2013, 2014, 2015‡, 2018	Miami Dolphins (2013–2015); Los Angeles Chargers (2018)	2014—Selected as a replacement for Mike Iupati
Art Powell	OE	1963 (AFL), 1966 (AFL), 1965 (AFL), 1966 (AFL)	Oakland Raiders	
Marvin Powell	OT	1979, 1980, 1981, 1982, 1983	New York Jets	
Jordan Poyer	SS	2022	Buffalo Bills	
Matt Prater	K	2013‡, 2016	Denver Broncos (2013); Detroit Lions (2016)	2013—Did not play in the Pro Bowl because the Broncos advanced to Super Bowl XLVIII; 2016—Selected as a replacement for Matt Bryant
Dak Prescott	QB	2016†, 2018, 2021‡	Dallas Cowboys	2018—Selected as a replacement for Drew Brees 2021—Selected as a replacement for Aaron Rodgers/Tom Brady; Did not play in the Pro Bowl due to injury
Roell Preston	WR	1998	Green Bay Packers	
Luke Prestridge	P	1982	Denver Broncos	
Eddie Price	FB	1951, 1952, 1954	New York Giants	
Vince Promuto	G	1963, 1964	Washington Redskins	
Greg Pruitt	RB	1973, 1974, 1976, 1977, 1983	Cleveland Browns (1973, 1974, 1976, 1977); Los Angeles Raiders (1983)	
Mike Pruitt	FB	1979, 1980	Cleveland Browns	
Trevor Pryce	DT, DE	1999, 2000, 2001, 2002	Denver Broncos	
Duane Putnam	G	1954, 1955, 1956, 1957, 1958	Los Angeles Rams	
Mike Pyle	C	1963	Chicago Bears	

== Q ==
†—Named as a starter ‡—Did not participate (see notes) #—Named Pro Bowl MVP/co-MVP (or equivalent)

Name	Position	Year(s) selected	Franchise(s) represented	Notes
Shelton Quarles	ILB	2002	Tampa Bay Buccaneers	
Mike Quick	WR	1983, 1984, 1985, 1986, 1987	Philadelphia Eagles	
Fred Quillan	C	1984, 1985	San Francisco 49ers	
Glover Quin	S	2014	Detroit Lions	
Skeets Quinlan	HB	1954	Los Angeles Rams	
Robert Quinn	DE, OLB	2013†, 2014, 2021†	St. Louis Rams (2013, 2014); Chicago Bears (2021)	

== R ==
†—Named as a starter ‡—Did not participate (see notes) #—Named Pro Bowl MVP/co-MVP (or equivalent)

Name	Position	Year(s) selected	Franchise(s) represented	Notes
Neil Rackers	K	2005	Arizona Cardinals	
Frank Ragnow	C	2020, 2022	Detroit Lions	
B. J. Raji	NT	2011	Green Bay Packers	
Jalen Ramsey	CB	2017†, 2018†, 2019‡, 2020†, 2021†‡	Jacksonville Jaguars (2017, 2018); Los Angeles Rams (2019–2021)	2019—Did not play in the Pro Bowl due to injury 2021—Did not play in the Pro Bowl because the Rams advanced to Super Bowl LVI
John Randle	DT	1993, 1994, 1995, 1996, 1997, 1998, 2001	Minnesota Vikings (1993–1998); Seattle Seahawks (2001)	
Sonny Randle	OE	1960, 1961 (NFL), 1962 (NFL), 1965 (NFL)	Chicago/St. Louis Cardinals	
Ahmad Rashad	WR	1978, 1979, 1980, 1981	Minnesota Vikings	
Jeremiah Ratliff	DT	2008†, 2009†, 2010†, 2011†	Dallas Cowboys	
Ken Reaves	CB	1969 (NFL)	Atlanta Falcons	
Jeremy Reaves	ST	2022†	Washington Commanders	
Bert Rechichar	K, DB	1955, 1956#, 1957	Baltimore Colts	1956—Named MVP of game
Haason Reddick	OLB	2022	Philadelphia Eagles	
Rick Redman	LB	1967 (AFL)	San Diego Chargers	
Marcel Reece	FB	2012, 2013, 2014, 2015‡	Oakland Raiders	2013—Selected as a replacement for Vonta Leach
Alvin Reed	TE	1968 (AFL), 1969 (AFL)	Houston Oilers	
Andre Reed	WR	1988, 1989, 1990, 1991, 1992, 1993, 1994	Buffalo Bills	
Ed Reed	S	2003, 2004, 2006, 2007†, 2008†‡, 2009†, 2010‡, 2011‡, 2012‡	Baltimore Ravens	2008—Did not play in the Pro Bowl due to injury 2010—Did not play in the Pro Bowl due to injury 2012—Did not play in the Pro Bowl because the Ravens advanced to Super Bowl XLVII
Jordan Reed	TE	2016	Washington Redskins	2016—Did not play in the Pro Bowl due to injury
Ike Reese	LB	2004	Philadelphia Eagles	
John Reger	LB	1959, 1960, 1961	Pittsburgh Steelers	
Jerry Reichow	WR	1961	Minnesota Vikings	
Eric Reid	S	2013	San Francisco 49ers	
Mike Reid	DT	1972, 1973	Cincinnati Bengals	
Mike Reinfeldt	S	1979	Houston Oilers	
Johnny Rembert	LB	1988, 1989	New England Patriots	
Mel Renfro	CB	1964, 1965, 1966, 1967, 1968, 1969, 1970, 1971, 1972, 1973	Dallas Cowboys	
Ray Renfro	WR	1953, 1957, 1960	Cleveland Browns	
Hunter Renfrow	WR	2021	Las Vegas Raiders	2021—Selected as a replacement for Keenan Allen
Pete Retzlaff	HB, WR, TE	1958, 1960, 1963, 1964, 1965	Philadelphia Eagles	
Fuad Reveiz	K	1994	Minnesota Vikings	
Darrelle Revis	CB	2008, 2009†, 2010†, 2011†, 2013, 2014, 2015	New York Jets (2008–2011, 2015); Tampa Bay Buccaneers (2013); New England Patriots (2014)	2014–Did not play in the Pro Bowl because the Patriots advanced to Super Bowl XLIX
Bob Reynolds	OT	1966 (NFL), 1968 (NFL), 1969 (NFL)	St. Louis Cardinals	
Jack Reynolds	MLB	1975, 1980	Los Angeles Rams	
Luke Rhodes	LS	2021†	Indianapolis Colts	
Xavier Rhodes	CB	2016, 2017†, 2019	Minnesota Vikings	2019—Selected as a replacement for Richard Sherman
Patrick Ricard	FB	2019†, 2020†, 2021†, 2022†	Baltimore Ravens	
Jerry Rice	WR	1986, 1987, 1988, 1989, 1990, 1991, 1992, 1993, 1994, 1995#, 1996, 1998, 2002	San Francisco 49ers (1986–1996, 1998); Oakland Raiders (2002)	1995—Named MVP of game
Ken Rice	OT	1961 (AFL)	Buffalo Bills	
Ray Rice	RB	2009, 2011, 2012	Baltimore Ravens	
Sidney Rice	WR	2009	Minnesota Vikings	
Simeon Rice	DE	1999, 2002, 2003	Arizona Cardinals (1999); Tampa Bay Buccaneers (2002, 2003)	
Jess Richardson	DT	1959	Philadelphia Eagles	
Sheldon Richardson	DT	2014	New York Jets	
Tony Richardson	FB	2003, 2004, 2007	Kansas City Chiefs (2003, 2004); Minnesota Vikings (2007)	
Willie Richardson	WR	1967, 1968	Baltimore Colts	
Les Richter	LB	1954, 1955, 1956, 1957, 1958, 1959, 1960, 1961	Los Angeles Rams	
John Riggins	RB	1975	New York Jets	
Gerald Riggs	RB	1985, 1986, 1987	Atlanta Falcons	
Jim Ringo	C	1957, 1958, 1959, 1960, 1961, 1962, 1963, 1964, 1965, 1967	Green Bay Packers (1957–1963); Philadelphia Eagles (1964, 1965, 1967)	
Cody Risien	OT	1986, 1987	Cleveland Browns	
Andre Rison	WR	1990, 1991, 1992, 1993, 1997	Atlanta Falcons (1990–1993); Kansas City Chiefs (1997)	
Jim Ritcher	G	1991, 1992	Buffalo Bills	
Marco Rivera	G	2002, 2003, 2004	Green Bay Packers	
Philip Rivers	QB	2006‡, 2009‡, 2010†, 2011, 2013, 2016, 2017‡, 2018‡	San Diego/Los Angeles Chargers	2006—Did not play in the Pro Bowl due to injury 2009—Did not play in the Pro Bowl due to injury 2016—Selected as a replacement for Ben Roethlisberger; 2017—Did not play in the Pro Bowl due to injury 2018—Did not play in the Pro Bowl due to injury
Carl Roaches	KR	1981	Houston Oilers	
Willie Roaf	OT	1994, 1995, 1996, 1997, 1998, 1999, 2000, 2002, 2003, 2004, 2005	New Orleans Saints (1994–2000); Kansas City Chiefs (2002–2005)	
Joe Robb	DE	1966 (NFL)	St. Louis Cardinals	
Barret Robbins	C	2002‡	Oakland Raiders	2002—Did not play in the Pro Bowl due to injury
Bo Roberson	OE	1965 (AFL)	Buffalo Bills	
Andre Roberts	KR	2018†, 2019, 2020†	New York Jets (2018); Buffalo Bills (2019, 2020)	2019—Selected as a replacement for Mecole Hardman
Gene Roberts	RB	1950	New York Giants	
William Roberts	G	1990	New York Giants	
Isiah Robertson	LB	1971, 1973, 1974, 1975, 1976, 1977	Los Angeles Rams	
Allen Robinson	WR	2015	Jacksonville Jaguars	
Dave Robinson	LB	1966, 1967, 1969	Green Bay Packers	
Eugene Robinson	S	1992, 1993, 1998	Seattle Seahawks (1992, 1993); Atlanta Falcons (1998)	
Jerry Robinson	OLB	1981	Philadelphia Eagles	
Johnny Robinson	S	1963 (AFL), 1964 (AFL), 1965 (AFL), 1966 (AFL), 1967 (AFL), 1968 (AFL), 1970	Kansas City Chiefs	
Koren Robinson	WR	2005	Minnesota Vikings	
Michael Robinson	FB	2011	Seattle Seahawks	
Paul Robinson	RB	1968, 1969	Cincinnati Bengals	
Wayne Robinson	LB	1954, 1955	Philadelphia Eagles	
Andy Robustelli	DE	1953, 1955, 1956, 1957, 1959, 1960, 1961	Los Angeles Rams (1953, 1955); New York Giants (1956, 1957, 1959–1961)	
Reggie Roby	P	1984, 1989, 1994	Miami Dolphins (1984, 1989); Washington Redskins (1994)	
Paul Rochester	DT	1961 (AFL)	Dallas Texans	
Walt Rock	OT	1965	San Francisco 49ers	
Aaron Rodgers	QB	2009†, 2011†, 2012‡, 2014, 2015‡, 2016‡, 2018‡, 2019‡, 2020†, 2021†‡	Green Bay Packers	2012—Did not play in the Pro Bowl due to injury 2015—Did not play in the Pro Bowl due to injury 2016—Did not play in the Pro Bowl due to injury 2018—Did not play in the Pro Bowl due to injury 2019—Did not play in the Pro Bowl due to injury 2021—Did not play in the Pro Bowl due to injury
Dominique Rodgers-Cromartie	CB	2009, 2015,	Arizona Cardinals (2009); New York Giants (2015)	2009—Did not play in the Pro Bowl due to injury 2015—Selected as a replacement for Malcolm Butler
Ben Roethlisberger	QB	2007, 2011†, 2014, 2015‡, 2016, 2017	Pittsburgh Steelers	2015—Did not play in the Pro Bowl due to injury 2016—Did not play in the Pro Bowl due to injury
Fran Rogel	FB	1956	Pittsburgh Steelers	
Carlos Rogers	CB	2011	San Francisco 49ers	2011—Did not play in the Pro Bowl due to injury
George Rogers	RB	1981, 1982	New Orleans Saints	
Shaun Rogers	DT	2004, 2005, 2008	Detroit Lions (2004, 2005); Cleveland Browns (2008)	
Len Rohde	T	1970	San Francisco 49ers	
Johnny Roland	RB	1966, 1967	St. Louis Cardinals	
Antrel Rolle	DB	2009, 2010, 2013	Arizona Cardinals (2009); New York Giants (2010, 2013)	
Samari Rolle	CB	2000	Tennessee Titans	
Bill Romanowski	LB	1996, 1998	Denver Broncos	
Tony Romo	QB	2006, 2007, 2009, 2014	Dallas Cowboys	2009—Selected as a replacement for Brett Favre
Michael Roos	OT	2008	Tennessee Titans	
Aldrick Rosas	K	2018†	New York Giants	
Dan Ross	TE	1982	Cincinnati Bengals	
Kevin Ross	CB	1989, 1990	Kansas City Chiefs	
Tim Rossovich	LB	1969	Philadelphia Eagles	
Allen Rossum	RS	2004	Atlanta Falcons	
Kyle Rote	HB, WR	1953, 1954, 1955, 1956	New York Giants	
Tobin Rote	QB	1956	Green Bay Packers	
Dave Rowe	DT	1968	New Orleans Saints	
Mike Rozier	RB	1987, 1988	Houston Oilers	
Mike Rucker	DE	2003	Carolina Panthers	
Tim Ruddy	C	2000	Miami Dolphins	2000—Selected as a replacement for Tom Nalen
Jack Rudnay	C	1973, 1974, 1975, 1976	Kansas City Chiefs	
Kyle Rudolph	TE	2012, 2017	Minnesota Vikings	2017—Selected as a replacement for Jimmy Graham
Jon Runyan	OT	2002	Philadelphia Eagles	
Andy Russell	LB	1968, 1970, 1971, 1972, 1973, 1974, 1975	Pittsburgh Steelers	
Darrell Russell	DT	1998, 1999	Oakland Raiders	
Joe Rutgens	DT	1963, 1965	Washington Redskins	
Ed Rutkowski	WR	1965 (AFL)	Buffalo Bills	
Frank Ryan	QB	1964, 1965, 1966	Cleveland Browns	
Matt Ryan	QB	2010, 2012, 2014, 2016	Atlanta Falcons	2016—Did not play in the Pro Bowl because the Falcons advanced to Super Bowl LI
DeMeco Ryans	ILB	2007, 2009	Houston Texans	
Mark Rypien	QB	1989, 1991	Washington Redskins	
