= Paul Miller (defensive end) =

American football player (1930–2007)

No. 81, 86, 85
- Position: Defensive end

Personal information
- Born: November 8, 1930; Mandeville, Louisiana, U.S.
- Died: January 24, 2007 (aged 76); Baton Rouge, Louisiana, U.S.
- Listed height: 6 ft 2 in (1.88 m)
- Listed weight: 226 lb (103 kg)

Career information
- High school: Istrouma (Baton Rouge)
- College: LSU
- NFL draft: 1953: 6th round, 64th overall pick

Career history
- Los Angeles Rams (1954–1957); Dallas Texans (1960-1961); New York Titans (1962)*; San Diego Chargers (1962)
- * Offseason or practice squad member only

Awards and highlights
- Pro Bowl (1956)

Career NFL/AFL statistics
- Sacks: 10
- Interceptions: 1
- Fumble recoveries: 5
- Stats at Pro Football Reference

Paul William Miller Jr. (November 8, 1930 – January 24, 2007) was an American professional football player who was a defensive end in the National Football League (NFL) and American Football League (AFL). He played college football for the LSU Tigers. Miller played for the NFL's Los Angeles Rams (1954–1957) and the AFL's Dallas Texans (1960–1961) and San Diego Chargers (1962).

== Career ==
Miller studied at Louisiana State University. While there, he was a three-year letterman and college boxing champion, competing as a heavyweight.

He was selected by the Los Angeles Rams in 1953 and signed his contract the following year.
