= 1963 Pro Bowl =

National Football League all-star game

1963 East–West Pro Bowl
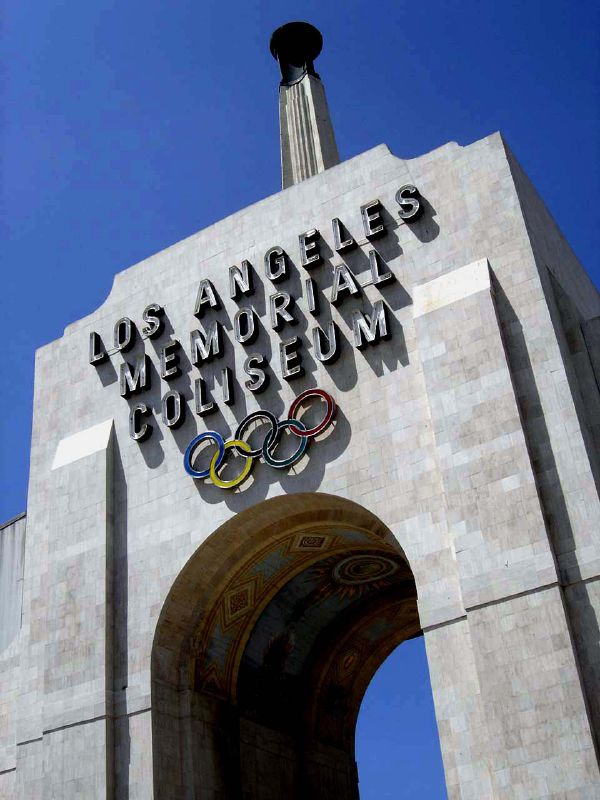
- The front of the L.A. Memorial Coliseum
Eastern Conference	Western Conference
30	20
Head coach: Allie Sherman (New York Giants)	Head coach: Vince Lombardi (Green Bay Packers)
	1	2	3	4	Total
Eastern Conference	13	0	0	17	30
Western Conference	0	3	17	0	20
- Date: January 13, 1963
- Stadium: Los Angeles Memorial Coliseum; Los Angeles, California
- Co-MVPs: Jim Brown (Cleveland Browns, FB), Gene Lipscomb (Pittsburgh Steelers, DT)
- Attendance: 61,374

TV in the United States
- Network: NBC
- Announcers: Chuck Thompson, Ken Coleman

The 1963 Pro Bowl was the National Football League's thirteenth annual all-star game which featured the outstanding performers from the 1962 season. The game was played on January 13, 1963, at the Los Angeles Memorial Coliseum in Los Angeles, California, under sunny skies in front of 61,374 fans.

The Eastern Conference was coached by Allie Sherman of the New York Giants and the West by Vince Lombardi of the Green Bay Packers. Both were the coaches in the NFL Championship Game, held two weeks earlier in New York.

Fullback Jim Brown of the Cleveland Browns set a Pro Bowl record, carrying for 141 yards, breaking his own record of 120 set the previous year; he was named the "Back of the Game." "Big Daddy" Gene Lipscomb of the Pittsburgh Steelers was awarded "Lineman of the Game" honors; he had perhaps the finest day of any defender in the history of the Pro Bowl, blocking two field goals and being responsible for hits that led to six West fumbles. It was Lipscomb's final NFL appearance; he died four months later.
