= 1956 Pro Bowl =

National Football League all-star game

1956 East–West Pro Bowl
Eastern Conference	Western Conference
31	30
Head coach: Joe Kuharich (Washington Redskins)	Head coach: Sid Gillman (Los Angeles Rams)
	1	2	3	4	Total
Eastern Conference	7	0	14	10	31
Western Conference	7	7	9	7	30
- Date: January 15, 1956
- Stadium: Memorial Coliseum; Los Angeles, California
- MVP: Ollie Matson (Chicago Cardinals)
- Attendance: 37,867

TV in the United States
- Network: not televised

The 1956 Pro Bowl was the National Football League's sixth annual all-star game which featured top performers from the 1955 season. The game was played on January 15, 1956, at the Los Angeles Memorial Coliseum in Los Angeles, California in front of 37,867 fans. The East squad defeated the West by a score of 31–30.

The West team was led by the Los Angeles Rams Sid Gillman while Joe Kuharich of the Washington Redskins' coached the East squad. Chicago Cardinals back Ollie Matson was selected as the game's outstanding player.
