= 1965 Pro Bowl =

National Football League all-star game

1965 East–West Pro Bowl
Eastern Conference	Western Conference
14	34
Head coach: Blanton Collier (Cleveland Browns)	Head coach: Don Shula (Baltimore Colts)
	1	2	3	4	Total
Eastern Conference	0	7	0	7	14
Western Conference	3	14	10	7	34
- Date: January 10, 1965
- Stadium: Memorial Coliseum; Los Angeles, California
- Co-MVPs: Fran Tarkenton (Minnesota Vikings), Terry Barr (Detroit Lions)
- Attendance: 60,698

TV in the United States
- Network: NBC
- Announcers: Ken Coleman, Gordie Soltau

The 1965 Pro Bowl was the NFL's fifteenth annual all-star game which featured the outstanding performers from the 1964 season. The game was played on January 10, 1965, at the Los Angeles Memorial Coliseum in Los Angeles, California in front of 60,698. The coaches for the game were Don Shula of Baltimore Colts for the West and Blanton Collier of Cleveland Browns for the East. The West team won by a final score was 34–14.

The West dominated the East, 411 to 187 in total yards. West quarterback Fran Tarkenton of the Minnesota Vikings was named "Back of the Game" after he completed 8 of 13 passes for 172 yards. At one point during the game, the West backfield was all-Vikings: Tarkenton (No. 10), Tommy Mason (No. 20), and Bill Brown (No. 30).

"Lineman of the Game" honors went to the West’s Terry Barr of the Detroit Lions; Barr had 106 yards receiving on three receptions.

Frank Ryan, the quarterback of the Cleveland Browns' who had defeated the Baltimore Colts in the 1964 NFL Championship Game, was knocked out of the Pro Bowl when he was sacked in the third quarter by a group of defenders including the Colts' Gino Marchetti. Some thought that Marchetti, who was playing in his tenth Pro Bowl, was trying to teach Ryan a lesson for considering running up the score against the Colts in the championship game. Marchetti denied this, and he and Ryan remained on good terms.

This was also the final Pro Bowl game to be televised by NBC before the AFL-NFL merger in 1970.

== Eastern Conference Roster ==
=== Offense ===
Position:	Starters:	Reserves:
Quarterback	13 Frank Ryan, Cleveland	
Running back		
Fullback	32 Jim Brown, Cleveland	

=== Defense ===
Position:	Starters:	Reserves:

=== Special teams ===
Position:	Player:
