= 1958 Pro Bowl =

National Football League all-star game

1958 East–West Pro Bowl
Eastern Conference	Western Conference
7	26
Head coach: Buddy Parker (Pittsburgh Steelers)	Head coach: George Wilson (Detroit Lions)
	1	2	3	4	Total
Eastern Conference	0	7	0	0	7
Western Conference	6	3	10	7	26
- Date: January 12, 1958
- Stadium: Memorial Coliseum; Los Angeles, California
- Co-MVPs: Hugh McElhenny (San Francisco 49ers), Gene Brito (Washington Redskins)
- Attendance: 66,634

TV in the United States
- Network: NBC
- Announcers: Joe Tucker, Van Patrick

The 1958 Pro Bowl was the NFL's eighth annual all-star game which featured the outstanding performers from the 1957 season. The game was played on January 12, 1958, at the Los Angeles Memorial Coliseum in Los Angeles, California in front of 66,634 fans. The West squad defeated the East by a score of 26–7.

The West team was led by the Detroit Lions' George Wilson while Buddy Parker of the Pittsburgh Steelers coached the East squad. San Francisco 49ers running back Hugh McElhenny was selected as the outstanding back of the game and defensive end Gene Brito of the Washington Redskins was named the outstanding lineman.

This was the first Pro Bowl to be televised nationally (except in the Los Angeles market where it was blacked out).
