= 1955 Pro Bowl =

National Football League all-star game

1955 East–West Pro Bowl
Eastern Conference	Western Conference
19	26
Head coach: Jim Trimble (Philadelphia Eagles)	Head coach: Buck Shaw (San Francisco 49ers)
	1	2	3	4	Total
Eastern Conference	13	6	0	0	19
Western Conference	3	6	7	10	26
- Date: January 16, 1955
- Stadium: Memorial Coliseum; Los Angeles, California
- MVP: Billy Wilson (San Francisco 49ers)
- Attendance: 42,972

TV in the United States
- Network: not televised

The 1955 Pro Bowl was the National Football League's (NFL) fifth annual all-star game which featured the league's outstanding performers from the 1954 season. The game was played on January 16, 1955, at the Los Angeles Memorial Coliseum in Los Angeles, California, in front of 42,972 fans. The West squad defeated the East by a score of 26–19.

The West team was led by Buck Shaw (although he had recently been fired by the San Francisco 49ers) while Jim Trimble of the Philadelphia Eagles coached the East squad. 49ers end Billy Wilson was unanimously selected as the game's outstanding player.
