= 1960 Pro Bowl =

National Football League all-star game

1960 East–West Pro Bowl
Eastern Conference	Western Conference
21	38
Head coach: Buck Shaw (Philadelphia Eagles)	Head coach: Red Hickey (San Francisco 49ers)
	1	2	3	4	Total
Eastern Conference	7	7	0	7	21
Western Conference	10	21	0	7	38
- Date: January 17, 1960
- Stadium: Memorial Coliseum; Los Angeles, California
- Co-MVPs: Johnny Unitas (Baltimore Colts), Eugene Lipscomb (Baltimore Colts)
- Attendance: 58,876

TV in the United States
- Network: NBC
- Announcers: Bob Kelley, Ray Scott

The 1960 Pro Bowl was the NFL's tenth annual all-star game which featured the outstanding performers from the 1959 season. The game was played on Saturday, January 17, 1960, at the Los Angeles Memorial Coliseum in Los Angeles, California in front of 58,876. The final score was West 38, East 21.

The East team was led by the Philadelphia Eagles' Buck Shaw while Red Hickey of the San Francisco 49ers coached the West squad. The Baltimore Colts swept the player of the game awards, with quarterback Johnny Unitas, the NFL MVP for 1959, being voted the outstanding back and defensive lineman Eugene Lipscomb named the outstanding lineman.
