= 1959 Pro Bowl =

National Football League all-star game

1959 East–West Pro Bowl
| Eastern Conference | Western Conference |
|---|---|
| 28 | 21 |
| Head coach: Jim Lee Howell (New York Giants) | Head coach: Weeb Ewbank (Baltimore Colts) |
| | 1 | 2 | 3 | 4 | Total |
|---|---|---|---|---|---|
| Eastern Conference | 9 | 7 | 0 | 12 | 28 |
| Western Conference | 7 | 7 | 7 | 0 | 21 |
- Date: January 11, 1959
- Stadium: Memorial Coliseum; Los Angeles, California
- Co-MVPs: Frank Gifford (New York Giants), Doug Atkins (Chicago Bears)
- Attendance: 72,250

TV in the United States
- Network: NBC
- Announcers: Jim Gibbons, Van Patrick

The 1959 Pro Bowl was the NFL's ninth annual all-star game which featured the outstanding performers from the 1958 season. The game was played on January 11, 1959, at the Los Angeles Memorial Coliseum in Los Angeles, California in front of 72,250 fans. The East scored 12 unanswered points in the fourth period to pull out a 28–21 victory.

The West team was led by the Baltimore Colts' Weeb Ewbank while Jim Lee Howell of the New York Giants coached the East squad.

The pregame build-up centered around West quarterback Bill Wade and East counterpart Norm Van Brocklin, who had spent four seasons as Los Angeles Rams teammates. After the 1957 season, with the less accomplished but younger Wade in the wings, Rams management decided not to extend Van Brocklin's contract. That prompted the 31-year-old veteran to retire briefly before he was dealt to the Philadelphia Eagles, one of the most significant developments of the off-season. The Pro Bowl marked a triumphant return to Los Angeles for the quarterback, who hooked up with Eagles end Pete Retzlaff on a 15-yard touchdown pass that gave the East a 26–21 lead with less than three minutes left in the fourth period.

New York Giants halfback Frank Gifford was selected as the outstanding back of the game and Chicago Bears defensive end Doug Atkins was named the outstanding lineman.
