= 1964 Pro Bowl =

National Football League all-star game

1964 East–West Pro Bowl
Eastern Conference	Western Conference
17	31
Head coach: Allie Sherman (New York Giants)	Head coach: George Halas (Chicago Bears)
	1	2	3	4	Total
Eastern Conference	3	0	0	14	17
Western Conference	7	7	14	3	31
- Date: January 12, 1964
- Stadium: Memorial Coliseum; Los Angeles, California
- Co-MVPs: Johnny Unitas (Baltimore Colts), Gino Marchetti (Baltimore Colts)
- Attendance: 67,242

TV in the United States
- Network: NBC
- Announcers: Chris Schenkel, George Connor

The 1964 Pro Bowl was the NFL's 14th annual all-star game which featured the outstanding performers from the 1963 season. The game was played on January 12, 1964, at the Los Angeles Memorial Coliseum in Los Angeles, California in front of a crowd of 67,242. The final score was West 31, East 17.

The game featured Chicago Bears coach George Halas' first appearance as an all-star coach since the 1942 All-Star game which featured Halas' Bears against an all-league squad; it was also to be his final Pro Bowl appearance. Allie Sherman of the New York Giants was the coach of the East. Two Baltimore Colts swept the player of the game awards: Johnny Unitas was named "back of the game" (his third Pro Bowl MVP) and Gino Marchetti won "lineman of the game" honors. Marchetti presented the game ball to Halas.
