= 1961 Pro Bowl =

National Football League all-star game

1961 East–West Pro Bowl
Eastern Conference	Western Conference
31	35
Head coach: Buck Shaw (Philadelphia Eagles)	Head coach: Vince Lombardi (Green Bay Packers)
	1	2	3	4	Total
Eastern Conference	3	14	7	7	31
Western Conference	7	14	7	7	35
- Date: January 15, 1961
- Stadium: Memorial Coliseum; Los Angeles, California
- Co-MVPs: Johnny Unitas (Baltimore Colts), Sam Huff (New York Giants)
- Attendance: 62,971

TV in the United States
- Network: NBC
- Announcers: Lindsey Nelson, Frankie Albert

The 1961 Pro Bowl was the NFL's eleventh annual all-star game which featured the outstanding performers from the 1960 season. The game was played on January 15, 1961, at the Los Angeles Memorial Coliseum in Los Angeles, California in front of 62,971 fans. The final score was West 35, East 31.

The coaches were Vince Lombardi of the Green Bay Packers and Buck Shaw of the Philadelphia Eagles. This game marked the end of the great career of Norm Van Brocklin. The Eagles' quarterback was playing in his final game after 12 seasons, having been named the coach of the expansion Minnesota Vikings. Van Brocklin was angry that the Eagles had not named him head coach, which he said they had promised following the retirement of Buck Shaw.

Jim Taylor scored a record three touchdowns, and Van Brocklin established Pro Bowl records for passing with 288 yards and three touchdowns. Yet fan favorite Johnny Unitas was voted the game’s outstanding back for the second season in a row and the Giants' Sam Huff took the lineman honors.
