= 1957 Pro Bowl =

National Football League all-star game

1957 East–West Pro Bowl
Eastern Conference	Western Conference
10	19
Head coach: Jim Lee Howell (New York Giants)	Head coach: Paddy Driscoll (Chicago Bears)
	1	2	3	4	Total
Eastern Conference	0	7	3	0	10
Western Conference	7	3	3	6	19
- Date: January 13, 1957
- Stadium: Memorial Coliseum; Los Angeles, California
- Co-MVPs: Bert Rechichar (Baltimore Colts), Ernie Stautner (Pittsburgh Steelers)
- Attendance: 44,177

TV in the United States
- Network: not televised

The 1957 Pro Bowl was the NFL's seventh annual all-star game which featured the outstanding performers from the 1956 season. The game was played on January 13, 1957, at the Los Angeles Memorial Coliseum in Los Angeles, California in front of 44,177 fans. The West squad defeated the East by a score of 19–10.

The West team was led by the Chicago Bears' Paddy Driscoll while Jim Lee Howell of the New York Giants coached the East squad. Baltimore Colts kicking specialist Bert Rechichar was selected as the outstanding player of the game while defensive tackle Ernie Stautner of the Pittsburgh Steelers was named the outstanding lineman.

Each player on the victorious West roster received $700, while the losing East players each took away $500.

As of 2023, this was the last time the Pro Bowl was played without being televised.
