= 1962 Pro Bowl =

National Football League all-star game

1962 East–West Pro Bowl
Eastern Conference	Western Conference
30	31
Head coach: Allie Sherman (New York Giants)	Head coach: Norm Van Brocklin (Minnesota Vikings)
	1	2	3	4	Total
Eastern Conference	3	7	6	14	30
Western Conference	14	3	7	7	31
- Date: January 14, 1962
- Stadium: Memorial Coliseum; Los Angeles, California
- Co-MVPs: Jim Brown (Cleveland Browns), Henry Jordan (Green Bay Packers)
- Attendance: 57,409

TV in the United States
- Network: NBC
- Announcers: Lindsey Nelson, Chuck Thompson

The 1962 Pro Bowl was the National Football League's twelfth annual all-star game which featured the outstanding performers from the 1961 season. The game was played on January 14, 1962, at the Los Angeles Memorial Coliseum in Los Angeles, California in front of 57,409 fans.

The coaches were Norm Van Brocklin of the Minnesota Vikings for the West and Allie Sherman of the New York Giants for the East. This Pro Bowl is considered one of the best, most-competitive games in history. After a Jim Brown fumble in the fourth quarter, Johnny Unitas drove the West to the East's 12-yard line. On the final play of the game, Unitas found halfback Jon Arnett alone in the end zone for the game-tying touchdown. The West kicked the winning point-after with time expired, making the final score 31–30.

Cleveland Browns fullback Jim Brown was voted the game's outstanding back and Henry Jordan of the Green Bay Packers was the selected as the lineman of the game.

Detroit Lions linebacker Joe Schmidt had his helmet wired for sound and to measure the shock of tackles in conjunction with a study by Northwestern University to help establish performance standards for headgear. The safety study was considered quite remarkable in that day and the specially adapted helmet cost $5,000.
