= Lists of Pro Bowl players =

The following is a list of players, both past and current, who have been selected to play in the NFL's annual Pro Bowl game, beginning with the 1950 season.

Between 1938 and 1942, an NFL all star team played the league champion in the NFL All-Star Game. Participants in these games are not recognized by the NFL as Pro Bowlers, and they are not included in this list. No games were played between 1943 and 1950.

Between 1961 and 1969, the NFL and AFL played separate all-star games. This list includes players who were selected to play in the American Football League All-Star game during that period.

Players are listed alphabetically, by surname:

- A
- B
- C–F
- G–H
- I–K
- L–M
- N–R
- S–V
- W–Z
