= List of Pro Bowl players, A =

The following is a list of players, both past and current, who have been selected to play in the NFL's annual Pro Bowl game, beginning with the 1950 season.

Between 1938 and 1942, an NFL all star team played the league champion in the NFL All-Star Game. Participants in these games are not recognized by the NFL as Pro Bowlers, and they are not included in this list. No games were played between 1943 and 1950.

Between 1961 and 1969, the NFL and AFL played separate all-star games. This list includes players who were selected to play in the American Football League All-Star game during that period.

== A ==
†—Named as a starter ‡—Did not participate (see notes) #—Named Pro Bowl MVP/co-MVP (or equivalent)

Name	Position	Year(s) selected	Franchise(s) represented	Notes
Donnie Abraham	CB	2000	Tampa Bay Buccaneers	
John Abraham	DE, OLB	2001, 2002, 2004, 2010†, 2013	New York Jets (2001, 2002, 2004); Atlanta Falcons (2010); Arizona Cardinals (2013)	
Tony Adamle	LB	1950, 1951	Cleveland Browns	
Davante Adams	WR	2017, 2018, 2019, 2020†, 2021†‡, 2022	Green Bay Packers (2017–2021) Las Vegas Raiders (2022)	2017—Selected as a replacement for Julio Jones; 2019—Selected as a replacement for Julio Jones; 2021—Did not play in the Pro Bowl due to injury
Flozell Adams	OT	2003, 2004, 2006, 2007†, 2008	Dallas Cowboys	2006—Selected as a replacement for Jammal Brown; 2008—Selected as a replacement for Walter Jones
Jamal Adams	SS	2018†#, 2019†, 2020	New York Jets (2018, 2019); Seattle Seahawks (2020)	2018—Named MVP of game
Julius Adams	DE	1980	New England Patriots	
Mike Adams	SS	2014, 2015	Indianapolis Colts	2014—Selected as a replacement for Kam Chancellor; 2015—Selected as a replacement for Kam Chancellor
Sam Adams	DT	2000†, 2001, 2004	Baltimore Ravens (2000, 2001); Buffalo Bills (2004)	
Ken Adamson	G	1961 (AFL)	Denver Broncos	
Joseph Addai	RB	2007	Indianapolis Colts	
Herb Adderley	KR, CB	1963 (NFL), 1964 (NFL), 1965 (NFL), 1966 (NFL), 1967 (NFL)	Green Bay Packers	
Tom Addison	LB	1961 (AFL), 1962 (AFL), 1963 (AFL), 1964 (AFL)	Boston Patriots	
Troy Aikman	QB	1991, 1992, 1993, 1994, 1995, 1996	Dallas Cowboys	
Jay Ajayi	RB	2016	Miami Dolphins	2016—Selected as a replacement for LeSean McCoy
David Akers	K	2001, 2002, 2004, 2009, 2010, 2011	Philadelphia Eagles (2001, 2002, 2004, 2009, 2010); San Francisco 49ers (2011)	
Dick Alban	S	1954	Washington Redskins	
Branden Albert	OT	2013, 2015	Kansas City Chiefs (2013); Miami Dolphins (2015)	2015—Selected as a replacement for Trent Williams
Frankie Albert	QB	1950	San Francisco 49ers	
Ethan Albright	LS	2007	Washington Redskins	
Grady Alderman	OT	1963 (NFL), 1964 (NFL), 1965 (NFL), 1966 (NFL), 1967 (NFL), 1969 (NFL)	Minnesota Vikings	
D. J. Alexander	ST	2016†	Kansas City Chiefs	2016—Selected as a replacement for Matthew Slater
Jaire Alexander	CB	2020†, 2022	Green Bay Packers	
Kermit Alexander	KR, CB	1968 (NFL)	San Francisco 49ers	
Kwon Alexander	LB	2017	Tampa Bay Buccaneers	2017—Selected as a replacement for Bobby Wagner
Lorenzo Alexander	ST, OLB	2012, 2016†#	Kansas City Chiefs (2012); Buffalo Bills (2016)	2016—Named MVP of game
Shaun Alexander	RB	2003, 2004, 2005	Seattle Seahawks	
Stephen Alexander	TE	2000	Washington Redskins	
Chuck Allen	LB	1963 (AFL), 1964 (AFL)	San Diego Chargers	
Eric Allen	CB	1989, 1991, 1992, 1993, 1994, 1995	Philadelphia Eagles (1989, 1991–1994); New Orleans Saints (1995)	
Jared Allen	DE	2007†, 2008, 2009†, 2011†, 2012	Kansas City Chiefs (2007); Minnesota Vikings (2008, 2009, 2011, 2012)	
Jonathan Allen	DT	2021†, 2022†	Washington Football Team/Commanders	
Josh Allen	DE	2019	Jacksonville Jaguars	2019—Selected as a replacement for Frank Clark
Josh Allen	QB	2020, 2021‡, 2022	Buffalo Bills	2021—Selected as a replacement for Lamar Jackson; Did not play in the Pro Bowl due to injury
Keenan Allen	WR	2017, 2018, 2019†, 2020, 2021‡	Los Angeles Chargers	2021—Did not play in the Pro Bowl due to injury
Larry Allen	G	1995, 1996, 1997, 1998, 1999, 2000†, 2001, 2003, 2004, 2005, 2006	Dallas Cowboys (1995–2001, 2003–2005); San Francisco 49ers (2006)	
Marcus Allen	RB	1982, 1984, 1985, 1986, 1987, 1993	Los Angeles Raiders (1982, 1984–1987); Kansas City Chiefs (1993)	
Terry Allen	RB	1996	Washington Redskins	
Mike Alstott	FB	1997, 1998, 1999, 2000†, 2001, 2002	Tampa Bay Buccaneers	
John Alt	OT	1992, 1993	Kansas City Chiefs	
Lance Alworth	FL	1963 (AFL), 1964 (AFL), 1965 (AFL), 1966 (AFL), 1967 (AFL), 1968 (AFL), 1969 (AFL)	San Diego Chargers	
Lyle Alzado	DE	1977, 1978	Denver Broncos	
Ashley Ambrose	CB	1996	Cincinnati Bengals	
Alan Ameche	FB	1955, 1956, 1957, 1958	Baltimore Colts	
Kimble Anders	FB	1995, 1996, 1997	Kansas City Chiefs	
Morten Andersen	K	1985, 1986, 1987, 1988, 1990, 1992, 1995	New Orleans Saints (1985–1988, 1990, 1992); Atlanta Falcons (1995)	
Bill Anderson	DE, TE	1959, 1960	Green Bay Packers	
C. J. Anderson	RB	2014	Denver Broncos	2014—Selected as a replacement for Le'Veon Bell
Derek Anderson	QB	2007	Cleveland Browns	2007—Selected as a replacement for Tom Brady
Dick Anderson	S	1972, 1973, 1974	Miami Dolphins	
Donny Anderson	HB, P	1968 (NFL)	Green Bay Packers	
Gary Anderson	K	1983, 1985, 1993, 1998	Pittsburgh Steelers (1983, 1985, 1993); Minnesota Vikings (1998)	
Gary Anderson	RB, KR	1986	San Diego Chargers	
Jamal Anderson	RB	1998	Atlanta Falcons	
Ken Anderson	QB	1975, 1976 1981, 1982	Cincinnati Bengals	
Neal Anderson	RB	1988, 1989, 1990, 1991	Chicago Bears	
Ottis Anderson	RB	1979, 1980	St. Louis Cardinals	
Richie Anderson	FB	2000	New York Jets	
Willie Anderson	OT	2003, 2004, 2005, 2006‡	Cincinnati Bengals	2006—Did not play in the Pro Bowl due to injury
Mark Andrews	TE	2019, 2021†, 2022	Baltimore Ravens	
Shawn Andrews	G	2006‡, 2007	Philadelphia Eagles	2006—Did not play in the Pro Bowl due to injury
William Andrews	RB	1980, 1981, 1982, 1983	Atlanta Falcons	
George Andrie	DE	1965 (NFL), 1966 (NFL), 1967 (NFL), 1968 (NFL), 1969 (NFL)	Dallas Cowboys	
Bryan Anger	P	2021†	Dallas Cowboys	
Charlie Ane Jr.	C, OT	1956, 1958	Detroit Lions	
Elmer Angsman	HB	1950	Chicago Cardinals	
Ezekiel Ansah	DE	2015	Detroit Lions	
Houston Antwine	DT	1963 (AFL), 1964 (AFL), 1965 (AFL), 1966 (AFL), 1967 (AFL), 1968 (AFL)	Boston Patriots	
Fred Arbanas	TE	1962 (AFL), 1963 (AFL), 1964 (AFL), 1965 (AFL), 1967 (AFL)	Dallas Texans/Kansas City Chiefs	
Jessie Armstead	LB	1997, 1998, 1999, 2000†, 2001	New York Giants	
Terron Armstead	OT	2018†‡, 2019, 2020, 2022†	New Orleans Saints (2018–2020) Miami Dolphins (2022)	2018—Did not play in the Pro Bowl due to injury
Bruce Armstrong	OT	1990, 1991, 1994†, 1995, 1996, 1997	New England Patriots	
Otis Armstrong	RB	1974, 1976	Denver Broncos	
Trace Armstrong	DE	2000†	Miami Dolphins	
Jon Arnett	HB	1957, 1958, 1959, 1960, 1961 (NFL)	Los Angeles Rams	
Jim Arnold	P	1987, 1988	Detroit Lions	
LaVar Arrington	OLB	2001, 2002, 2003	Washington Redskins	
Nnamdi Asomugha	CB	2008†, 2009†, 2010†‡	Oakland Raiders	2010—Did not play in the Pro Bowl due to injury
Bill Atkins	S, P	1961 (AFL)	Buffalo Bills	
Doug Atkins	DE	1957, 1958#, 1959, 1960, 1961 (NFL), 1962 (NFL), 1963 (NFL), 1965 (NFL)	Chicago Bears	1958—Named Outstanding Lineman of game
Geno Atkins	DT	2011, 2012†, 2014, 2015, 2016†, 2017†, 2018†‡, 2019	Cincinnati Bengals	2011—Selected as a replacement for Vince Wilfork; 2014—Selected as a replacement for Ndamukong Suh; 2018—Did not play in the Pro Bowl due to injury
Al Atkinson	LB	1968 (AFL)	New York Jets	
George Atkinson	S, KR	1968 (AFL), 1969 (AFL)	Oakland Raiders	
Steve Atwater	S	1990, 1991, 1992, 1993, 1994, 1995, 1996, 1998	Denver Broncos	
Bill Austin	G	1954	New York Giants	
Miles Austin	WR	2009†, 2010	Dallas Cowboys	2010—Selected as a replacement for DeSean Jackson
Cliff Avril	DE	2016†	Seattle Seahawks	
Brendon Ayanbadejo	ST	2006, 2007, 2008	Chicago Bears (2006, 2007); Baltimore Ravens (2008)	
Jerry Azumah	KR	2003	Chicago Bears	
