= List of Pro Bowl players, C–F =

The following is a list of players, both past and current, who have been selected to play in the NFL's annual Pro Bowl game, beginning with the 1950 season.

Between 1938 and 1942, an NFL all star team played the league champion in the NFL All-Star Game. Participants in these games are not recognized by the NFL as Pro Bowlers, and they are not included in this list. No games were played between 1943 and 1950.

Between 1961 and 1969, the NFL and AFL played separate all-star games. This list includes players who were selected to play in the American Football League All-Star game during that period.

== C ==
†—Named as a starter ‡—Did not participate (see notes) #—Named Pro Bowl MVP/co-MVP (or equivalent)

Name	Position	Year(s) selected	Franchise(s) represented	Notes
Lee Roy Caffey	LB	1965	Green Bay Packers	
Rich Camarillo	P	1983, 1989, 1991, 1992, 1993	New England Patriots (1983); Phoenix Cardinals (1989, 1991–1993)	
Jordan Cameron	TE	2013	Cleveland Browns	
Calais Campbell	DE, DT	2014, 2015, 2017†‡, 2018, 2019, 2020	Arizona Cardinals (2014, 2015); Jacksonville Jaguars (2017–2019); Baltimore Ravens (2020)	2017—Did not play in the Pro Bowl due to injury 2018—Selected as a replacement for J. J. Watt
Earl Campbell	RB	1978, 1979, 1980, 1981, 1983	Houston Oilers	
Marion Campbell	DT, DE	1959, 1960	Philadelphia Eagles	
Woody Campbell	RB	1967 (AFL)	Houston Oilers	
John Cannady	LB	1950, 1952	New York Giants	
Billy Cannon	HB, TE	1961 (AFL), 1969 (AFL)	Houston Oilers (1961); Oakland Raiders (1969)	
Gino Cappelletti	OE, K	1961 (AFL), 1963 (AFL), 1964 (AFL), 1965 (AFL), 1966 (AFL)	Boston Patriots	
Al Carapella	DT	1954	San Francisco 49ers	
Wray Carlton	HB, FB	1965 (AFL), 1966 (AFL)	Buffalo Bills	
Harold Carmichael	WR	1973, 1978, 1979, 1980	Philadelphia Eagles	
Reggie Carolan	TE	1962 (AFL)	San Diego Chargers	
John Carney	PK	1994, 2008	San Diego Chargers (1994); New Orleans Saints (2008)	
J. C. Caroline	DB	1956	Chicago Bears	
Joe Carollo	T	1968	Los Angeles Rams	
Dan Carpenter	PK	2009	Miami Dolphins	
Ken Carpenter	HB	1951	Cleveland Browns	
Preston Carpenter	TE	1962 (NFL)	Pittsburgh Steelers	
Derek Carr	QB	2015, 2016‡, 2017	Oakland Raiders	2015—Selected as a replacement for Aaron Rodgers; 2016—Did not play in the Pro Bowl due to injury 2017—Selected as a replacement for Tom Brady
Fred Carr	LB	1970, 1972, 1975	Green Bay Packers	
Roger Carr	WR	1976	Baltimore Colts	
Mark Carrier	WR	1989	Tampa Bay Buccaneers	
Mark Carrier	S	1990, 1991, 1993	Chicago Bears	
Carlos Carson	WR	1983, 1987	Kansas City Chiefs	
Harry Carson	LB	1978, 1979, 1981, 1982, 1983, 1984, 1985, 1986, 1987	New York Giants	
Johnny Carson	TE	1957	Washington Redskins	
Dwayne Carswell	TE	2001	Denver Broncos	
Andre Carter	DE	2011	New England Patriots	2011—Did not play in the Pro Bowl because the Patriots advanced to Super Bowl XLVI
Anthony Carter	WR	1987, 1988, 1989	Minnesota Vikings	
Cris Carter	WR	1993, 1994, 1995, 1996, 1997, 1998, 1999, 2000	Minnesota Vikings	
Dale Carter	CB	1994, 1995, 1996, 1997	Kansas City Chiefs	
Jim Carter	LB	1973	Green Bay Packers	
Kevin Carter	DE	1998, 2002	St. Louis Rams (1998); Tennessee Titans (2002)	
Michael Carter	NT	1985, 1987, 1988	San Francisco 49ers	
Tommy Casanova	DB	1974, 1976, 1977	Cincinnati Bengals	
Rick Casares	HB, FB	1955, 1956, 1957, 1958, 1959	Chicago Bears	
Scott Case	CB	1988	Atlanta Falcons	
Bernie Casey	FL	1967 (NFL)	Los Angeles Rams	
Jurrell Casey	DE	2015, 2016, 2017†, 2018†‡, 2019	Tennessee Titans	2015—Selected as a replacement for Kawann Short; 2018—Did not play in the Pro Bowl due to injury 2019—Selected as a replacement for Chris Jones
Dave Casper	TE	1976, 1977, 1978, 1979, 1980	Oakland Raiders (1976–1979); Houston Oilers (1980)	
Jim Cason	S	1951, 1954	San Francisco 49ers	
Matt Cassel	QB	2010	Kansas City Chiefs	
Rich Caster	TE	1972, 1974, 1975	New York Jets	
Chuck Cecil	FS	1992	Green Bay Packers	
Larry Centers	FB	1995 1996, 2001	Arizona Cardinals (1995, 1996); Buffalo Bills (2001)	
Byron Chamberlain	TE	2001	Minnesota Vikings	
Chris Chambers	WR	2005	Miami Dolphins	
Wally Chambers	DT	1973, 1975, 1976	Chicago Bears	
Kam Chancellor	SS	2011, 2013‡, 2014‡, 2015‡	Seattle Seahawks	2011—Selected as a replacement for Dashon Goldson; 2013—Did not play in the Pro Bowl because the Seahawks advanced to Super Bowl XLVIII; 2014—Did not play in the Pro Bowl because the Seahawks advanced to Super Bowl XLIX; 2015—Did not play in the Pro Bowl due to injury
Chris Chandler	QB	1997, 1998	Atlanta Falcons	
Don Chandler	PK, P	1967	Green Bay Packers	
Wes Chandler	WR	1979, 1982, 1983, 1985	New Orleans Saints (1979); San Diego Chargers (1983, 1985)	
David Chapple	P	1972	Los Angeles Rams	
Lynn Chandnois	KR, HB	1952, 1953	Pittsburgh Steelers	
D. J. Chark	WR	2019	Jacksonville Jaguars	2019—Selected as a replacement for Tyreek Hill
Jamaal Charles	RB	2010, 2012, 2013†, 2014†	Kansas City Chiefs	
Ja'Marr Chase	WR	2021†‡, 2022	Cincinnati Bengals	2021—Did not play in the Pro Bowl because the Bengals advanced to Super Bowl LVI
Corey Chavous	SS	2003†	Minnesota Vikings	
Deron Cherry	FS	1983, 1984, 1985, 1986, 1987, 1988	Kansas City Chiefs	
Raymond Chester	TE	1970, 1971, 1972, 1979	Oakland Raiders	
Ray Childress	DT	1988, 1990, 1991, 1992, 1993	Houston Oilers	
Henry Childs	TE	1979	New Orleans Saints	
Mark Chmura	TE	1995, 1997, 1998	Green Bay Packers	
Jack Christiansen	S	1953, 1954, 1955, 1956, 1957	Detroit Lions	
Todd Christensen	TE	1983, 1984, 1985, 1986, 1987	Los Angeles Raiders	
Dick Christy	HB	1962 (AFL)	New York Titans	
Jeff Christy	C	1998†, 1999†, 2000	Minnesota Vikings (1998, 1999); Tampa Bay Buccaneers (2000)	
Bradley Chubb	OLB	2020†	Denver Broncos	
Nick Chubb	RB	2019†, 2020, 2021, 2022†	Cleveland Browns	
Tyson Clabo	OT	2010†	Atlanta Falcons	2010—Selected as a replacement for Jason Peters
Ryan Clady	OT	2009†, 2011, 2012‡, 2014†	Denver Broncos	2011—Selected as a replacement for Jake Long; 2012—Did not play in the Pro Bowl due to injury
Jack Clancy	FL	1967 (AFL)	Miami Dolphins	
Bruce Clark	DE	1984	New Orleans Saints	
Dallas Clark	TE	2009‡	Indianapolis Colts	2009—Did not play in the Pro Bowl because the Colts advanced to Super Bowl XLIV
Dwight Clark	WR	1981, 1982	San Francisco 49ers	
Frank Clark	DE	2019‡, 2020, 2021	Kansas City Chiefs	2019—Did not play in the Pro Bowl because the Chiefs advanced to Super Bowl LIV 2021—Selected as a replacement for Trey Hendrickson
Gary Clark	WR	1986, 1987, 1990, 1991	Washington Redskins	
Kenny Clark	DT	2019, 2021‡	Green Bay Packers	2019—Selected as a replacement for Aaron Donald; 2021—Did not play in the Pro Bowl due to injury
Mike Clark	K	1966 (NFL)	Pittsburgh Steelers	
Ryan Clark	FS	2011	Pittsburgh Steelers	2011—Selected as a replacement for Ed Reed; 2012—Selected as an alternate, unable to play due to injury (does not count as an official Pro Bowl selection)
Hagood Clarke	S	1965 (AFL)	Buffalo Bills	
Leon Clarke	OE	1956	Los Angeles Rams	
Raymond Clayborn	CB	1983, 1985, 1986	New England Patriots	
Mark Clayton	WR	1984, 1985, 1986, 1988, 1991	Miami Dolphins	
Nate Clements	CB	2004	Buffalo Bills	
Chad Clifton	OT	2007, 2010‡	Green Bay Packers	2007—Selected as a replacement for Walter Jones; 2010—Did not play in the Pro Bowl because the Packers advanced to Super Bowl XLV
Ha Ha Clinton-Dix	FS	2016	Green Bay Packers	
Jadeveon Clowney	DE, LB	2016‡, 2017†‡, 2018†	Houston Texans	2016—Did not play in the Pro Bowl due to injury 2017—Did not play in the Pro Bowl due to injury 2018—Did not play in the Pro Bowl due to injury
Dexter Coakley	LB	1999, 2001, 2003	Dallas Cowboys	
Ben Coates	TE	1994, 1995, 1996, 1997, 1998	New England Patriots	
Randall Cobb	WR	2014	Green Bay Packers	
Mike Cofer	LB	1988	Detroit Lions	
Paul Coffman	TE	1982, 1983, 1984	Green Bay Packers	
Gail Cogdill	WR	1960, 1962, 1963	Detroit Lions	
Tarik Cohen	KR	2018†	Chicago Bears	
Jim Colclough	OE	1962 (AFL)	Boston Patriots	
A. J. Cole	P	2021†	Las Vegas Raiders	
Robin Cole	ILB	1984	Pittsburgh Steelers	
Trent Cole	DE	2007, 2009	Philadelphia Eagles	2007—Selected as a replacement for Patrick Kerney
Marco Coleman	DE	2000	Washington Redskins	
Rod Coleman	DT	2005	Atlanta Falcons	
Laveranues Coles	WR	2003	Washington Redskins	
Elmer Collett	G	1969 (NFL)	San Francisco 49ers	
Gary Collins	WR	1965 (NFL), 1966 (NFL)	Cleveland Browns	
Jamie Collins	OLB	2015	New England Patriots	2015—Did not play in the Pro Bowl due to injury
Jim Collins	ILB	1985	Los Angeles Rams	
Kerry Collins	QB	1996, 2008,	Carolina Panthers (1996); Tennessee Titans (2008)	2008—Selected as a replacement for Brett Favre
Landon Collins	SS	2016†, 2017†‡, 2018†‡	New York Giants	2017—Did not play in the Pro Bowl due to injury 2018—Did not play in the Pro Bowl due to injury
Nick Collins	SS	2008†, 2009†, 2010‡	Green Bay Packers	2010—Did not play in the Pro Bowl because the Packers advanced to Super Bowl XLV
Ray Collins	DT	1951	San Francisco 49ers	
Tony Collins	RB	1983,	New England Patriots	
Cris Collinsworth	WR	1981, 1982, 1983	Cincinnati Bengals	
Don Colo	DT	1954, 1955, 1958	Cleveland Browns	
Dustin Colquitt	P	2012, 2016	Kansas City Chiefs	2016—Selected as a replacement for Pat McAfee
Jon Condo	LS	2009, 2011	Oakland Raiders	
Charlie Conerly	QB	1950, 1956	New York Giants	
Shane Conlan	ILB	1988, 1989, 1990	Buffalo Bills	
James Conner	RB	2018†, 2021	Pittsburgh Steelers (2018); Arizona Cardinals (2021)	
Dan Conners	LB	1967 (AFL), 1968 (AFL), 1969 (AFL)	Oakland Raiders	
Ted Connolly	G	1961	San Francisco 49ers	
George Connor	T	1950, 1951, 1952, 1953	Chicago Bears	
Bobby Joe Conrad	WR	1964	St. Louis Cardinals	
Dalvin Cook	RB	2019†, 2020†, 2021†	Minnesota Vikings	
Jared Cook	TE	2018, 2019	Oakland Raiders (2018); New Orleans Saints (2019)	2018—Selected as a replacement for Travis Kelce; 2019—Selected as a replacement for Zach Ertz
Marv Cook	TE	1991, 1992	New England Patriots	
Ed Cooke	DE	1966 (AFL)	Miami Dolphins	
Chris Cooley	TE	2007, 2008	Washington Redskins	
Amari Cooper	WR	2015, 2016‡, 2018, 2019	Oakland Raiders (2015, 2016); Dallas Cowboys (2018, 2019)	2015—Selected as a replacement for Brandon Marshall; 2016—Did not play in the Pro Bowl due to injury 2018—Selected as a replacement for Michael Thomas; 2019—Selected as a replacement for Mike Evans
Pharoh Cooper	KR	2017†	Los Angeles Rams	
Walt Corey	LB	1963 (AFL)	Kansas City Chiefs	
Jerry Cornelison	OT	1962 (AFL)	Dallas Texans	
Frank Corral	K	1978	Los Angeles Rams	
Doug Cosbie	TE	1983, 1984, 1985	Dallas Cowboys	
Dave Costa	DT	1963 (AFL), 1967 (AFL), 1968 (AFL), 1969 (AFL)	Oakland Raiders (1963); Denver Broncos (1967–1969)	
Paul Costa	TE	1965 (AFL), 1966 (AFL)	Buffalo Bills	
Tex Coulter	OT, C	1951, 1952	New York Giants	
Kirk Cousins	QB	2016, 2019, 2021, 2022	Washington Redskins (2016); Minnesota Vikings (2019, 2021, 2022)	2016—Selected as a replacement for Aaron Rodgers; 2019—Selected as a replacement for Aaron Rodgers; 2021—Selected as a replacement for Aaron Rodgers
Jim Covert	OT	1985, 1986	Chicago Bears	
Charley Cowan	OT	1968 (NFL), 1969 (NFL), 1970	Los Angeles Rams	
Sam Cowart	LB	2000	Buffalo Bills	
Bryan Cox	LB	1992, 1994, 1995	Miami Dolphins	
Fletcher Cox	DT	2015, 2016†, 2017†‡, 2018†‡, 2019†, 2020†	Philadelphia Eagles	2017—Did not play in the Pro Bowl because the Eagles advanced to Super Bowl LII; 2018—Did not play in the Pro Bowl due to injury
Fred Cox	K	1970	Minnesota Vikings	
Morgan Cox	LS	2015, 2016†, 2019†, 2020†, 2022†	Baltimore Ravens (2015, 2016, 2019, 2020) Tennessee Titans (2022)	
Russ Craft	DB	1951, 1952	Philadelphia Eagles	
Roger Craig	FB, RB	1985, 1987, 1988, 1989	San Francisco 49ers	
Lou Creekmur	OT, OG	1950, 1951, 1952, 1953, 1954, 1955, 1956, 1957	Detroit Lions	
Josh Cribbs	KR	2007, 2009, 2012	Cleveland Browns	
Antonio Cromartie	CB	2007, 2012, 2013, 2014	San Diego Chargers (2007); New York Jets (2012, 2013); Arizona Cardinals (2014)	
Nolan Cromwell	DB	1980, 1981, 1982, 1983	Los Angeles Rams	
Maxx Crosby	DE	2021†, 2022†	Las Vegas Raiders	
Jeff Cross	DE	1990	Miami Dolphins	
Irv Cross	CB	1964, 1965	Philadelphia Eagles	
Randy Cross	G	1981, 1982, 1984	San Francisco 49ers	
John David Crow	HB	1959, 1960, 1962, 1965	Chicago Cardinals (1959); St. Louis Cardinals (1960, 1962); San Francisco 49ers (1965)	
Lindon Crow	CB	1956, 1957, 1959	Chicago Cardinals (1956, 1957); New York Giants (1959)	
Alge Crumpler	TE	2003, 2004, 2005, 2006	Atlanta Falcons	
Victor Cruz	WR	2012	New York Giants	
Larry Csonka	FB	1970, 1971, 1972, 1973, 1974	Miami Dolphins	
Curley Culp	DT	1969, 1971, 1975, 1976, 1977, 1978	Kansas City Chiefs (1969, 1971); Houston Oilers (1975–1978)	
Daunte Culpepper	QB	2000, 2003, 2004	Minnesota Vikings	
Billy Cundiff	PK	2010	Baltimore Ravens	
Randall Cunningham	QB	1988, 1989, 1990, 1998	Philadelphia Eagles (1988–1990); Minnesota Vikings (1998)	
Sam Cunningham	FB	1978	New England Patriots	
Mike Current	T	1969	Denver Broncos	
Dan Currie	LB	1960	Green Bay Packers	
Bill Curry	C	1971, 1972	Baltimore Colts	
Isaac Curtis	WR	1973, 1974, 1975, 1976	Cincinnati Bengals	
Mike Curtis	LB	1968, 1970, 1971, 1974	Baltimore Colts	
Brian Cushing	OLB	2009	Houston Texans	
Jay Cutler	QB	2008	Denver Broncos	

== D ==
†—Named as a starter ‡—Did not participate (see notes) #—Named Pro Bowl MVP/co-MVP (or equivalent)

Name	Position	Year(s) selected	Franchise(s) represented	Notes
Dave Dalby	C	1977	Oakland Raiders	
Carroll Dale	FL/WR	1968 (NFL), 1969 (NFL), 1970	Green Bay Packers	
Andy Dalton	QB	2011, 2014, 2016	Cincinnati Bengals	2011—Selected as a replacement for Tom Brady; 2014—Selected as a replacement for Aaron Rodgers; 2016—Selected as a replacement for Tom Brady
Eldon Danenhauer	OT	1962 (AFL), 1965 (AFL)	Denver Broncos	
Clem Daniels	HB	1963 (AFL), 1964 (AFL), 1965 (AFL), 1966 (AFL)	Oakland Raiders	
Mike Daniels	DT	2017	Green Bay Packers	2017—Selected as a replacement for Aaron Donald
Owen Daniels	TE	2008, 2012	Houston Texans	2008—Selected as a replacement for Antonio Gates; 2012—Selected as a replacement for Rob Gronkowski
Thom Darden	S	1978	Cleveland Browns	
Marcell Dareus	DT	2013, 2014	Buffalo Bills	
Dick Daugherty	LB	1957	Los Angeles Rams	
Jim David	DB	1954, 1955, 1956, 1957, 1958, 1959	Detroit Lions	
Lavonte David	LB	2015	Tampa Bay Buccaneers	
Ben Davidson	DE	1966 (AFL), 1967 (AFL), 1968 (AFL)	Oakland Raiders	
Cotton Davidson	QB	1961 (AFL)#,1963 (AFL)	Dallas Texans (1961); Oakland Raiders (1963)	1961—Named MVP of game
Ben Davis	CB	1972	Cleveland Browns	
Demario Davis	MLB	2022	New Orleans Saints	
Eric Davis	CB	1995, 1996	San Francisco 49ers (1995); Carolina Panthers (1996)	
Fred Davis	DT	1950	Chicago Bears	
Glenn Davis	HB	1950	Los Angeles Rams	
Leonard Davis	G	2007†, 2008‡, 2009†	Dallas Cowboys	2008—Did not play in the Pro Bowl due to injury
Stephen Davis	RB	1999, 2000, 2003	Washington Redskins (1999, 2000); Carolina Panthers (2003)	2000—Selected as a replacement for Marshall Faulk
Terrell Davis	RB	1996, 1997, 1998	Denver Broncos	
Thomas Davis	OLB	2015‡, 2016†, 2017	Carolina Panthers	2015—Did not play in the Pro Bowl because the Panthers advanced to Super Bowl 50; 2017—Selected as a replacement for Anthony Barr
Tommy Davis	K	1962 (NFL), 1963 (NFL)	San Francisco 49ers	
Vernon Davis	TE	2009†, 2013	San Francisco 49ers	
Vontae Davis	CB	2014, 2015	Indianapolis Colts	2015—Selected as a replacement for Chris Harris Jr.
Willie Davis	DE	1963, 1964, 1965, 1966, 1967	Green Bay Packers	
Brian Dawkins	S	1999, 2001, 2002, 2004, 2005, 2006, 2008, 2009, 2011	Philadelphia Eagles (1999, 2001, 2002, 2004–2006, 2008); Denver Broncos (2009, 2011)	
Dion Dawkins	OT	2021	Buffalo Bills	
Dermontti Dawson	C	1992, 1993, 1994, 1995, 1996, 1997, 1998	Pittsburgh Steelers	
Len Dawson	QB	1962 (AFL), 1964 (AFL), 1966 (AFL), 1967 (AFL), 1968 (AFL)#, 1969 (AFL), 1971	Dallas Texans (1962); Kansas City Chiefs (1964–1969, 1971)	
Phil Dawson	PK	2012	Cleveland Browns	
Tom Day	DE	1965 (AFL)	Buffalo Bills	
Fred Dean	DE	1979, 1980, 1981, 1983	San Diego Chargers (1979, 1980); San Francisco 49ers (1981, 1983)	
Ted Dean	FB, KR	1961 (NFL)	Philadelphia Eagles	
David DeCastro	G	2015, 2016†, 2017†, 2018†‡, 2019‡, 2020	Pittsburgh Steelers	2018—Did not play in the Pro Bowl due to injury 2019—Did not play in the Pro Bowl due to injury
Thomas DeCoud	FS	2012	Atlanta Falcons	2012—Selected as a replacement for Dashon Goldson
Bob Dee	DE	1961 (AFL), 1963 (AFL), 1964 (AFL), 1965 (AFL)	Boston Patriots	
Jack Del Rio	MLB	1994	Minnesota Vikings	
Joe DeLamielleure	G	1975, 1976, 1977, 1978, 1979, 1980	Buffalo Bills (1975–1979); Cleveland Browns (1980)	
Joe Delaney	RB	1981	Kansas City Chiefs	
Tom DeLeone	C	1979, 1980	Cleveland Browns	
Jake Delhomme	QB	2005	Carolina Panthers	
Steve DeLong	DE	1969 (AFL)	San Diego Chargers	
Bob DeMarco	C	1963, 1965, 1967	St. Louis Cardinals	
Tom Dempsey	K	1969	New Orleans Saints	
John Denney	LS	2010, 2012	Miami Dolphins	
Al Denson	WR	1967 (AFL), 1969 (AFL)	Denver Broncos	
Richard Dent	DE	1984, 1985, 1990, 1993	Chicago Bears	
Zak DeOssie	LS	2008, 2010	New York Giants	
Andrew DePaola	LS	2022†	Minnesota Vikings	
Dean Derby	CB	1959	Pittsburgh Steelers	
Al DeRogatis	DT	1950, 1951	New York Giants	
Darrell Dess	G	1962 (NFL), 1963 (NFL)	New York Giants	
James Develin	FB	2017†‡	New England Patriots	2017—Did not play in the Pro Bowl because the Patriots advanced to Super Bowl LII
Willard Dewveall	OE	1962 (AFL)	Houston Oilers	
Buddy Dial	OE	1961 (NFL), 1963 (NFL)	Pittsburgh Steelers	
Eric Dickerson	RB	1983, 1984, 1986, 1987, 1988, 1989	Los Angeles Rams (1983, 1984, 1986); Indianapolis Colts (1987–1989)	
Landon Dickerson	G	2022†	Philadelphia Eagles	
Michael Dickson	P	2018†	Seattle Seahawks	
David Diehl	OT	2009	New York Giants	
Doug Dieken	OT	1980	Cleveland Browns	
Kris Dielman	G	2007, 2008, 2009, 2010	San Diego Chargers	
Dan Dierdorf	OT	1974, 1975, 1976, 1977, 1978, 1980	St. Louis Cardinals	
Quandre Diggs	S	2020†, 2021†‡, 2022†	Seattle Seahawks	2021—Did not play in the Pro Bowl due to injury
Stefon Diggs	WR	2020†, 2021, 2022†	Buffalo Bills	
Trevon Diggs	CB	2021†, 2022†	Dallas Cowboys	
Trent Dilfer	QB	1997	Tampa Bay Buccaneers	
Ken Dilger	TE	2001	Indianapolis Colts	
Bobby Dillon	S	1955, 1956, 1957, 1958	Green Bay Packers	
Corey Dillon	RB	1999, 2000, 2001, 2004	Cincinnati Bengals (1999–2001); New England Patriots (2004)	
Patrick DiMarco	RB	2015	Atlanta Falcons	
Cris Dishman	CB	1991, 1997	Houston Oilers (1991); Washington Redskins (1997)	
Mike Ditka	TE	1961, 1962, 1963, 1964, 1965	Chicago Bears	
Hanford Dixon	CB	1986, 1987, 1988	Cleveland Browns	
Hewritt Dixon	RB	1966 (AFL), 1967 (AFL), 1968 (AFL), 1970	Oakland Raiders	
Conrad Dobler	G	1975, 1976, 1977	St. Louis Cardinals	
Darnell Dockett	DE	2007, 2009, 2010	Arizona Cardinals	
Dale Dodrill	DT	1954, 1955, 1956, 1958	Pittsburgh Steelers	
Chris Doleman	DE	1987, 1988, 1989, 1990, 1992, 1993, 1995, 1997	Minnesota Vikings (1987–1990, 1992, 1993); Atlanta Falcons (1995); San Francisco 49ers (1997)	
Don Doll	DB, S	1950, 1951, 1952#, 1953	Detroit Lions (1950–1952); Washington Redskins (1953)	1952—Named MVP of game
Aaron Donald	DT	2014, 2015, 2016‡, 2017†‡, 2018†‡, 2019†‡, 2020†, 2021†‡, 2022†	St. Louis/Los Angeles Rams	2016—Did not play in the Pro Bowl due to injury 2017—Did not play in the Pro Bowl due to injury 2018—Did not play in the Pro Bowl because the Rams advanced to Super Bowl LIII; 2019—Did not play in the Pro Bowl due to injury 2021—Did not play in the Pro Bowl because the Rams advanced to Super Bowl LVI
Ray Donaldson	C	1986, 1987, 1988, 1989, 1995, 1996	Indianapolis Colts (1986–1989); Dallas Cowboys (1995, 1996)	
Art Donovan	DT	1952, 1954, 1955, 1956, 1957	Baltimore Colts	
Pat Donovan	OT	1978, 1979, 1980, 1981	Dallas Cowboys	
Jim Doran	WR	1960	Dallas Cowboys	
Jon Dorenbos	LS	2009, 2014	Philadelphia Eagles	
Keith Dorney	T	1982	Detroit Lions	
Tony Dorsett	RB	1978, 1981, 1982, 1983	Dallas Cowboys	
Al Dorow	QB	1956, 1961 (AFL)	Washington Redskins (1956); New York Titans (1961)	
John "Kayo" Dottley	FB	1951	Chicago Bears	
Hugh Douglas	DE	2000, 2001, 2002	Philadelphia Eagles	
Bob Dove	E	1950	Chicago Cardinals	
Eddie Dove	CB	1961	San Francisco 49ers	
Boyd Dowler	OE	1965 (NFL), 1967 (NFL)	Green Bay Packers	
Jack Doyle	TE	2017, 2019	Indianapolis Colts	2017—Selected as a replacement for Rob Gronkowski; 2019—Selected as a replacement for Travis Kelce
Chuck Drazenovich	MLB	1955, 1956, 1957, 1958	Washington Redskins	
Donald Driver	WR	2002, 2006, 2007	Green Bay Packers	
Eddie Drummond	KR	2004	Detroit Lions	
Fred Dryer	DE	1975	Los Angeles Rams	
Elbert Dubenion	WR	1964 (AFL)	Buffalo Bills	
Bill Dudley	HB	1950, 1951	Washington Redskins	
Dave Duerson	S	1985, 1986, 1987, 1988	Chicago Bears	
A. J. Duhe	DE	1984	Miami Dolphins	
Elvis Dumervil	OLB, DE	2009†, 2011†, 2012 2014, 2015	Denver Broncos (2009, 2011, 2012); Baltimore Ravens (2014, 2015)	
Jim Dunaway	DT	1965 (AFL), 1966 (AFL), 1967 (AFL), 1968 (AFL)	Buffalo Bills	
Curtis Duncan	WR	1992	Houston Oilers	
Speedy Duncan	KR, CB	1965 (AFL), 1966 (AFL), 1967 (AFL), 1971	San Diego Chargers (1965–1967); Washington Redskins (1971)	
Carlos Dunlap	DE	2015, 2016	Cincinnati Bengals	2015—Selected as a replacement for Muhammad Wilkerson; 2016—Selected as a replacement for Jadeveon Clowney
Warrick Dunn	RB	1997, 2000, 2005	Tampa Bay Buccaneers (1997, 2000); Atlanta Falcons (2005)	2000—Selected as a replacement for Robert Smith
Mark Duper	WR	1983, 1984, 1986	Miami Dolphins	
Billy Joe DuPree	TE	1976, 1977, 1978	Dallas Cowboys	
John Dutton	DE	1975, 1976, 1977	Baltimore Colts	
Devin Duvernay	KR	2021, 2022†	Baltimore Ravens	

== E ==
†—Named as a starter ‡—Did not participate (see notes) #—Named Pro Bowl MVP/co-MVP (or equivalent)

Name	Position	Year(s) selected	Franchise(s) represented	Notes
Kenny Easley	SS	1982, 1983, 1984, 1985, 1987	Seattle Seahawks	
Eric Ebron	TE	2018	Indianapolis Colts	
Brad Ecklund	C	1950, 1951	New York Yanks	
Brad Edelman	G	1987	New Orleans Saints	
Booker Edgerson	DB	1965 (AFL)	Buffalo Bills	
Bobby Joe Edmonds	RB	1986	Seattle Seahawks	
Ferrell Edmunds	TE	1989, 1990	Miami Dolphins	
Tremaine Edmunds	ILB	2019, 2020	Buffalo Bills	2019—Selected as a replacement for Dont’a Hightower
Braylon Edwards	WR	2007†	Cleveland Browns	
Dan Edwards	OE	1950	New York Yanks	
Donnie Edwards	LB	2002	San Diego Chargers	
Glen Edwards	S	1975, 1976	Pittsburgh Steelers	
Tyler Eifert	TE	2015	Cincinnati Bengals	
Larry Eisenhauer	DE	1962 (AFL), 1963 (AFL), 1964 (AFL), 1966 (AFL)	Boston Patriots	
Carl Ekern	LB	1986	Los Angeles Rams	
Cleveland Elam	DT	1976, 1977	San Francisco 49ers	
Jason Elam	PK	1995, 1998, 2001	Denver Broncos	
Henry Ellard	WR	1984, 1988, 1989	Los Angeles Rams	
Carl Eller	DE	1968, 1969, 1970, 1971, 1973, 1974	Minnesota Vikings	
Ezekiel Elliott	RB	2016†, 2018, 2019	Dallas Cowboys	
Jake Elliott	K	2021	Philadelphia Eagles	2019—Selected as a replacement for Matt Gay
John Elliott	DT	1968 (AFL), 1969 (AFL), 1970	New York Jets	
Jumbo Elliott	OT	1993	New York Giants	
Allan Ellis	CB	1977	Chicago Bears	
Greg Ellis	DE	2007	Dallas Cowboys	
Ken Ellis	CB	1973, 1974	Green Bay Packers	
Shaun Ellis	DE	2003, 2009	New York Jets	
Willie Ellison	RB	1971	Los Angeles Rams	
Luther Elliss	DT	1999, 2000	Detroit Lions	
Leo Elter	RB	1956	Washington Redskins	
John Elway	QB	1986, 1987, 1989, 1991, 1993, 1994, 1996, 1997, 1998	Denver Broncos	
Doug English	DT	1978, 1981, 1982, 1983	Detroit Lions	
Evan Engram	TE	2020	New York Giants	
Tom Erlandson	LB	1966 (AFL)	Miami Dolphins	
Zach Ertz	TE	2017†‡, 2018†‡, 2019	Philadelphia Eagles	2017—Did not play in the Pro Bowl because the Eagles advanced to Super Bowl LII; 2018—Did not play in the Pro Bowl due to injury 2019—Did not play in the Pro Bowl due to injury
Boomer Esiason	QB	1986, 1988, 1989, 1993	Cincinnati Bengals	
Bob Etter	K	1969 (NFL)	Atlanta Falcons	
Jahri Evans	G	2009‡, 2010†, 2011†, 2012†, 2013, 2014	New Orleans Saints	2009—Did not play in the Pro Bowl because the Saints advanced to Super Bowl XLIV
Mike Evans	WR	2016, 2018, 2019‡, 2021	Tampa Bay Buccaneers	2018—Selected as a replacement for Julio Jones; 2019—Did not play in the Pro Bowl due to injury 2021—Selected as a replacement for Davante Adams
Norm Evans	OT	1972, 1974	Miami Dolphins	
Jim Everett	QB	1990	Los Angeles Rams	
Thomas Everett	FS	1993	Dallas Cowboys	

== F ==
†—Named as a starter ‡—Did not participate (see notes) #—Named Pro Bowl MVP/co-MVP (or equivalent)

Name	Position	Year(s) selected	Franchise(s) represented	Notes
Keith Fahnhorst	OT	1984	San Francisco 49ers	
Earl Faison	DL	1961 (AFL), 1962 (AFL), 1963 (AFL), 1964 (AFL), 1965 (AFL)	San Diego Chargers	
Alan Faneca	G	2001, 2002, 2003, 2004, 2005, 2006, 2007, 2008, 2009	Pittsburgh Steelers (2001–2007); New York Jets (2008, 2009)	
D'Marco Farr	DT	1999	St. Louis Rams	
Mel Farr	RB	1967, 1970	Detroit Lions	
Miller Farr	CB	1967 (AFL), 1968 (AFL), 1969 (AFL)	Houston Oilers	
James Farrior	MLB	2004, 2008	Pittsburgh Steelers	
Ken Farragut	C	1953	Philadelphia Eagles	
Heath Farwell	ST	2009	Minnesota Vikings	
Marshall Faulk	RB	1994#, 1995, 1998, 1999, 2000, 2001, 2002	Indianapolis Colts (1994, 1995, 1998); St. Louis Rams (1999–2002)	1994—Named MVP of game
Brett Favre	QB	1992, 1993, 1995, 1996, 1997, 2001, 2002, 2003, 2007, 2008, 2009	Green Bay Packers (1992, 1993, 1995–1997, 2001–2003, 2007); New York Jets (2008); Minnesota Vikings (2009)	
Jeff Feagles	P	1995, 2008	Arizona Cardinals (1995); New York Giants (2008)	
Tom Fears	SE	1950	Los Angeles Rams	
Dick Felt	DB	1961 (AFL), 1962 (AFL)	New York Titans (1961); Boston Patriots (1962)	
Jerome Felton	FB	2012	Minnesota Vikings	
Gary Fencik	S	1980, 1981	Chicago Bears	
Charley Ferguson	TE	1965 (AFL)	Buffalo Bills	
D'Brickashaw Ferguson	OT	2009, 2010, 2011	New York Jets	
Howie Ferguson	FB	1955	Green Bay Packers	
Brandon Fields	P	2013	Miami Dolphins	
Joe Fields	C	1981, 1982	New York Jets	
Mark Fields	LB	2000, 2004	New Orleans Saints (2000); Carolina Panthers (2004)	
Jim Finks	QB	1952	Pittsburgh Steelers	
Cortland Finnegan	CB	2008	Tennessee Titans	
Bill Fischer	LT, RG	1950, 1951, 1952	Chicago Cardinals	
Pat Fischer	DB, CB	1964 (NFL), 1965 (NFL), 1969 (NFL)	St. Louis Cardinals (1964, 1965); Washington Redskins (1969)	
Eric Fisher	OT	2018	Kansas City Chiefs	
Galen Fiss	LB	1962 (NFL), 1963 (NFL)	Cleveland Browns	
Larry Fitzgerald	WR	2005, 2007†, 2008†#, 2009‡, 2010, 2011†, 2012 2013, 2015‡, 2016‡, 2017‡	Arizona Cardinals	2008—Named MVP of game 2009—Did not play in the Pro Bowl due to injury 2010—Selected as a replacement for Greg Jennings; 2012—Selected as a replacement for Brandon Marshall; 2013—Selected as a replacement for Demaryius Thomas; 2015—Did not play in the Pro Bowl due to injury 2016—Did not play in the Pro Bowl due to injury 2017—Did not play in the Pro Bowl due to injury
Minkah Fitzpatrick	FS	2019, 2020†, 2022†	Pittsburgh Steelers	
Paul Flatley	FL	1966 (NFL)	Minnesota Vikings	
Ed Flanagan	C	1969 (NFL), 1970, 1971, 1973	Detroit Lions	
Mike Flanagan	C	2003	Green Bay Packers	2003—Selected as a replacement for Olin Kreutz
London Fletcher	ILB	2009†, 2010, 2011, 2012	Washington Redskins	2009—Selected as a replacement for Jonathan Vilma; 2011—Selected as a replacement for Brian Urlacher; 2012—Selected as a replacement for Patrick Willis
George Flint	G	1965 (AFL)	Buffalo Bills	
Tom Flores	QB	1966 (AFL)	Oakland Raiders	
Brandon Flowers	CB	2013	Kansas City Chiefs	
Don Floyd	DE	1961 (AFL), 1962 (AFL)	Houston Oilers	
Doug Flutie	QB	1998	Buffalo Bills	
Nick Foles	QB	2013	Philadelphia Eagles	
Dave Foley	OT	1973	Buffalo Bills	
Tim Foley	S	1979	Miami Dolphins	
Nick Folk	K	2007	Dallas Cowboys	
Lee Folkins	TE	1963 (NFL)	Dallas Cowboys	
Dee Ford	OLB	2018	Kansas City Chiefs	
Len Ford	DE	1951, 1952, 1953, 1954	Cleveland Browns	
Chuck Foreman	RB	1973, 1974, 1975, 1976, 1977	Minnesota Vikings	
Bill Forester	LB	1959, 1960, 1961, 1962	Green Bay Packers	
Justin Forsett	RB	2014	Baltimore Ravens	
Matt Forte	RB	2011, 2013	Chicago Bears	
Joe Fortunato	LB	1958, 1962, 1963, 1964, 1965	Chicago Bears	
Arian Foster	RB	2010, 2011, 2012, 2014	Houston Texans	
Barry Foster	RB	1992, 1993	Pittsburgh Steelers	
Roy Foster	G	1985, 1986	Miami Dolphins	
Dan Fouts	QB	1979, 1980, 1981, 1982#, 1983, 1985	San Diego Chargers	
Jack Fox	P	2020	Detroit Lions	
Tim Fox	S	1980	New England Patriots	
Bill Fralic	G	1986, 1987, 1988, 1989	Atlanta Falcons	
Doug France	OT	1977, 1978	Los Angeles Rams	
Russ Francis	TE	1977, 1978, 1979	New England Patriots	
Andra Franklin	RB	1982	Miami Dolphins	
Tony Franklin	K	1986	New England Patriots	
Bubba Franks	TE	2001, 2002, 2003	Green Bay Packers	
Jim Fraser	LB	1962 (AFL), 1963 (AFL), 1964 (AFL)	Denver Broncos	
Charley Frazier	FL	1966 (AFL)	Houston Oilers	
Willie Frazier	TE	1965 (AFL), 1967 (AFL), 1969 (AFL)	Houston Oilers (1965); San Diego Chargers (1967, 1969)	
Travis Frederick	C	2014, 2015, 2016†, 2017, 2019	Dallas Cowboys	
Tucker Frederickson	RB	1965 (NFL)	New York Giants	
Antonio Freeman	WR	1998	Green Bay Packers	
Devonta Freeman	RB	2015, 2016‡	Atlanta Falcons	2016—Did not play in the Pro Bowl because the Falcons advanced to Super Bowl LI
Dwight Freeney	DE	2003, 2004, 2005, 2008, 2009, 2010, 2011	Indianapolis Colts	
Rocky Freitas	T	1972	Detroit Lions	
Gus Frerotte	QB	1996	Washington Redskins	
Toni Fritsch	K	1979	Houston Oilers	
Irving Fryar	WR	1985, 1993, 1994, 1996, 1997	New England Patriots (1985); Miami Dolphins (1993, 1994); Philadelphia Eagles (1996, 1997)	
David Fulcher	S	1988, 1989, 1990	Cincinnati Bengals	
Jean Fugett	TE	1977	Washington Redskins	
Frank Fuller	DT	1959	Chicago Cardinals	
Kyle Fuller	CB	2018†, 2019	Chicago Bears	2019—Selected as a replacement for Jalen Ramsey
William Fuller	DE	1991, 1994, 1995, 1996	Houston Oilers (1991); Philadelphia Eagles (1994–1996)	
Brent Fullwood	RB	1989	Green Bay Packers	
