= List of Pro Bowl players, W–Z =

The following is a list of players, both past and current, who have been selected to play in the NFL's annual Pro Bowl game, beginning with the 1950 season.

Between 1938 and 1942, an NFL all star team played the league champion in the NFL All-Star Game. Participants in these games are not recognized by the NFL as Pro Bowlers, and they are not included in this list. No games were played between 1943 and 1950.

Between 1961 and 1969, the NFL and AFL played separate all-star games. This list includes players who were selected to play in the American Football League All-Star game during that period.

== W ==
†—Named as a starter ‡—Did not participate (see notes) #—Named Pro Bowl MVP/co-MVP (or equivalent)

Name	Position	Year(s) selected	Franchise(s) represented	Notes
Bill Wade	QB	1958, 1963 (NFL)	Los Angeles Rams (1958); Chicago Bears (1963)	
Bobby Wagner	ILB	2014‡, 2015, 2016†, 2017‡, 2018, 2019†‡, 2020†, 2021‡2023	Seattle Seahawks	2014—Did not play in the Pro Bowl because the Seahawks advanced to Super Bowl XLIX; 2017—Did not play in the Pro Bowl due to injury 2019—Did not play in the Pro Bowl due to injury 2021—Did not play in the Pro Bowl due to injury
Mike Wagner	SS	1975, 1976	Pittsburgh Steelers	
Mike Wahle	G	2005	Carolina Panthers	
Cameron Wake	OLB, DE	2010†, 2012, 2013†, 2014, 2016†	Miami Dolphins	
Bobby Walden	P	1969 (NFL)	Pittsburgh Steelers	
Chuck Walker	DT	1966 (NFL)	St. Louis Cardinals	
Delanie Walker	TE	2015, 2016, 2017	Tennessee Titans	2015—Selected as a replacement for Greg Olsen; 2017—Selected as a replacement for Travis Kelce
Doak Walker	HB, K	1950, 1951, 1953, 1954, 1955	Detroit Lions	
Gary Walker	DT	2001, 2002	Jacksonville Jaguars (2001); Houston Texans (2002)	
Herschel Walker	RB	1987, 1988	Dallas Cowboys	
Javon Walker	WR	2004	Green Bay Packers	
Wayne Walker	LB, K	1963 (NFL), 1964 (NFL), 1965 (NFL)	Detroit Lions	
Wesley Walker	WR	1978, 1982	New York Jets	
Mike Wallace	WR	2011†	Pittsburgh Steelers	
Steve Wallace	OT	1992	San Francisco 49ers	
Darren Waller	TE	2020	Las Vegas Raiders	
Ron Waller	HB	1955	Los Angeles Rams	
Fred Wallner	G, LB	1955	Chicago Cardinals	
Everson Walls	CB	1981, 1982, 1983, 1985	Dallas Cowboys	
Wesley Walls	TE	1996, 1997, 1998 1999, 2001	Carolina Panthers	
Bill Walsh	C	1950, 1951	Pittsburgh Steelers	
Blair Walsh	K	2012	Minnesota Vikings	
Bobby Walston	K, OE	1960, 1961 (NFL)	Philadelphia Eagles	
Stan Walters	OT	1978, 1979	Philadelphia Eagles	
Denzel Ward	CB	2018, 2021	Cleveland Browns	
Hines Ward	WR	2001, 2002, 2003, 2004	Pittsburgh Steelers	
T. J. Ward	SS	2013, 2014, 2015‡	Cleveland Browns (2013); Denver Broncos (2014, 2015)	2013—Selected as a replacement for Troy Polamalu; 2015—Named as an alternate, retroactively credited with Pro Bowl selection after the Broncos advanced to Super Bowl 50
DeMarcus Ware	OLB, DE	2006, 2007†, 2008†, 2009†, 2010†, 2011†, 2012‡, 2014, 2015‡	Dallas Cowboys (2006–2012); Denver Broncos (2014, 2015)	2012—Did not play in the Pro Bowl due to injury 2015—Did not play in the Pro Bowl because the Broncos advanced to Super Bowl 50
Paul Warfield	WR	1964 (NFL), 1968 (NFL), 1969 (NFL), 1970, 1971, 1972, 1973, 1974	Cleveland Browns (1964, 1968, 1969); Miami Dolphins (1970–1974)	
Larry Warford	G	2017, 2018, 2019	New Orleans Saints	2017—Selected as a replacement for Brandon Brooks; 2018—Selected as a replacement for Zack Martin; 2019—Selected as a replacement for Zack Martin
Ernie Warlick	TE	1962 (AFL), 1963 (AFL), 1964 (AFL), 1965 (AFL)	Buffalo Bills	
Charley Warner	DB, KR	1965 (AFL)	Buffalo Bills	
Curt Warner	RB	1983, 1986, 1987	Seattle Seahawks	
Fred Warner	ILB	2020, 2022†	San Francisco 49ers	
Kurt Warner	QB	1999, 2000, 2001, 2008†	St. Louis Rams (1999–2001); Arizona Cardinals (2008)	
Chris Warren	RB	1993, 1994, 1995	Seattle Seahawks	
Jimmy Warren	CB	1966 (AFL)	Miami Dolphins	
Daryl Washington	LB	2012	Arizona Cardinals	2012—Selected as a replacement for NaVorro Bowman
Dave Washington	LB	1976	San Francisco 49ers	
Gene Washington	WR	1969, 1970	Minnesota Vikings	
Gene Washington	WR	1969, 1970, 1971, 1972	San Francisco 49ers	
Joe Washington	RB	1979	Baltimore Colts	
Leon Washington	KR	2008, 2012	New York Jets (2008); Seattle Seahawks (2012)	
Marcus Washington	LB	2004	Washington Redskins	
Russ Washington	RT	1974, 1975, 1977, 1978, 1979	San Diego Chargers	
Ted Washington	DT	1997, 1998, 2000, 2001	Buffalo Bills (1997, 1998, 2000); Chicago Bears (2001)	
Vic Washington	RB	1971	San Francisco 49ers	
Bob Waterfield	QB	1950, 1951	Los Angeles Rams	
Brian Waters	G	2004, 2005, 2006, 2008, 2010, 2011†‡	Kansas City Chiefs (2004–2006, 2008); New England Patriots (2010)	2011—Did not play in the Pro Bowl because the Patriots advanced to Super Bowl XLVI
Charlie Waters	SS	1976, 1977, 1978	Dallas Cowboys	
Deshaun Watson	QB	2018, 2019, 2020	Houston Texans	2018—Selected as a replacement for Tom Brady
Steve Watson	WR	1981	Denver Broncos	
J. J. Watt	DE	2012†, 2013, 2014, 2015‡, 2018†‡	Houston Texans	2015—Did not play in the Pro Bowl due to injury 2018—Did not play in the Pro Bowl due to injury
T. J. Watt	OLB	2018, 2019†, 2020†, 2021†, 2022	Pittsburgh Steelers	2018—Selected as a replacement for Jadeveon Clowney
Ricky Watters	RB	1992, 1993, 1994, 1995, 1996	San Francisco 49ers (1992–1994); Philadelphia Eagles (1995, 1996)	
Tress Way	P	2019†, 2022†	Washington Redskins/Commanders	
Dave Waymer	CB	1987	New Orleans Saints	
Reggie Wayne	WR	2006, 2007†, 2008, 2009†‡, 2010†, 2012	Indianapolis Colts	2009—Did not play in the Pro Bowl because the Colts advanced to Super Bowl XLIV
Jim Weatherall	DT	1955 1956	Philadelphia Eagles	
Leonard Weaver	FB	2009	Philadelphia Eagles	
Don Webb	DB	1969 (AFL)	Boston Patriots	
Richmond Webb	OT	1990, 1991, 1992, 1993, 1994, 1995, 1996	Miami Dolphins	
Alex Webster	HB, FB	1958, 1961	New York Giants	
Dave Webster	CB	1961 (AFL)	Dallas Texans	
George Webster	LB	1967 (AFL), 1968 (AFL), 1969 (AFL)	Houston Oilers	
Mike Webster	C	1978, 1979, 1980, 1981, 1982, 1983, 1984, 1985, 1987	Pittsburgh Steelers	
Eric Weddle	FS	2011, 2013, 2014, 2016, 2017†, 2018	San Diego Chargers (2011, 2013, 2014); Baltimore Ravens (2016–2018)	2016—Selected as a replacement for Devin McCourty
Jon Weeks	LS	2015	Houston Texans	
Eric Weems	ST	2010	Atlanta Falcons	
Roger Wehrli	CB	1970, 1971, 1974, 1975, 1976, 1977, 1979	St. Louis Cardinals	
Arnie Weinmeister	DT	1950, 1951, 1952, 1953	New York Giants	
Wes Welker	WR	2008, 2009‡, 2010, 2011‡, 2012‡	New England Patriots	2009—Did not play in the Pro Bowl due to injury 2010—Selected as a replacement for Andre Johnson; 2011—Did not play in the Pro Bowl because the Patriots advanced to Super Bowl XLVI; 2012—Did not play in the Pro Bowl due to injury
Billy Wells	HB	1954	Washington Redskins	
Scott Wells	C	2011	Green Bay Packers	
Warren Wells	OE, WR	1968 (AFL), 1970	Oakland Raiders	
Carson Wentz	QB	2017†‡	Philadelphia Eagles	2017—Did not play in the Pro Bowl due to injury, and because the Eagles advanced to Super Bowl LII
Stan West	DT	1951, 1952	Los Angeles Rams	
Willie West	CB	1963 (AFL), 1966 (AFL)	Buffalo Bills (1963); Miami Dolphins (1966)	
Brian Westbrook	RB	2004, 2007	Philadelphia Eagles	
Dick Westmoreland	DB	1967 (AFL)	Miami Dolphins	
Tom Wham	DE	1951	Chicago Cardinals	
Larry Whigham	S	1997, 2001	New England Patriots (1997); Chicago Bears (2001)	
Charles White	RB	1987	Los Angeles Rams	
Danny White	QB	1982	Dallas Cowboys	
Devin White	ILB	2021	Tampa Bay Buccaneers	2021—Selected as a replacement for Bobby Wagner
Dwight White	DE	1972, 1973	Pittsburgh Steelers	
Ed White				
Lorenzo White	G	1975, 1976, 1977, 1979	Minnesota Vikings (1975–1977); San Diego Chargers (1979)	
Randy White	DT	1977, 1978, 1979, 1980, 1981, 1982, 1983, 1984, 1985	Dallas Cowboys	
Reggie White	DE	1986#, 1987, 1988, 1989, 1990, 1991, 1992, 1993, 1994†, 1995, 1996, 1997, 1998	Philadelphia Eagles (1986–1992); Green Bay Packers (1993–1998)	1986—Named MVP of game
Roddy White	WR	2008, 2009, 2010†, 2011	Atlanta Falcons	2009—Selected as a replacement for Sidney Rice; 2011—Selected as a replacement for Calvin Johnson
Sammy White	WR	1976, 1977	Minnesota Vikings	
Tre'Davious White	CB	2019†, 2020†	Buffalo Bills	
Cody Whitehair	C	2018	Chicago Bears	2018—Selected as a replacement for Max Unger
Bob Whitfield	OT	1998	Atlanta Falcons	
Donte Whitner	S	2012†‡, 2013‡, 2014	San Francisco 49ers (2012, 2013); Cleveland Browns (2014)	2012—Did not play in the Pro Bowl because the 49ers advanced to Super Bowl XLVII; 2013—Selected as a replacement for Earl Thomas, did not play in the Pro Bowl due to injury 2014—Selected as a replacement for Earl Thomas
Dave Whitsell	CB	1967 (NFL)	New Orleans Saints	
Jesse Whittenton	CB	1961 (NFL), 1963 (NFL)	Green Bay Packers	
Andrew Whitworth	OT	2012, 2015, 2016, 2017	Cincinnati Bengals	2012—Selected as a replacement for Ryan Clady; 2016—Selected as a replacement for Donald Penn; 2017—Selected as a replacement for Trent Williams
Ron Widby	P	1971	Dallas Cowboys	
Casey Wiegmann	C	2008	Denver Broncos	
Ray Wietecha	C	1957, 1958, 1960, 1962	New York Giants	
Paul Wiggin	DE	1965, 1967	Cleveland Browns	
Bill Wightkin	OT	1955	Chicago Bears	
Dave Wilcox	LB	1966, 1968, 1969, 1970, 1971, 1972, 1973	San Francisco 49ers	
James Wilder	RB	1984	Tampa Bay Buccaneers	
Dick Wildung	DT	1951	Green Bay Packers	
Marcellus Wiley	DE	2001	San Diego Chargers	
Vince Wilfork	DT	2007, 2009†, 2010†, 2011‡, 2012‡	New England Patriots	2011—Did not play in the Pro Bowl because the Patriots advanced to Super Bowl XLVI; 2012—Did not play in the Pro Bowl due to injury
Doug Wilkerson	G	1980, 1981, 1982	San Diego Chargers	
Muhammad Wilkerson	DE	2015‡	New York Jets	2015—Did not play in the Pro Bowl due to injury
Jeff Wilkins	K	2003	St. Louis Rams	
Ken Willard	FB	1965, 1966, 1968, 1969	San Francisco 49ers	
Norm Willey	DE	1954, 1955	Philadelphia Eagles	
Aeneas Williams	CB, FS	1994, 1995, 1996, 1997, 1998, 1999, 2001, 2003	Arizona Cardinals (1994–1999); St. Louis Rams (2001, 2003)	
Alfred Williams	DE	1996	Denver Broncos	
Ben Williams	DE	1982	Buffalo Bills	
Brandon Williams	DT	2018	Baltimore Ravens	2018—Selected as a replacement for Geno Atkins
Darryl Williams	FS	1997	Seattle Seahawks	
DeAngelo Williams	RB	2009	Carolina Panthers	
Delvin Williams	RB	1976, 1978	San Francisco 49ers (1976); Miami Dolphins (1978)	
Erik Williams	OT	1993, 1996, 1997, 1999	Dallas Cowboys	
Fred Williams	DT	1952, 1953, 1958, 1959	Chicago Bears	
Jamal Williams	NT	2005, 2006, 2007	San Diego Chargers	
James O. Williams	T	2001	Chicago Bears	
John L. Williams	FB	1990, 1991	Seattle Seahawks	
Johnny Williams	DB	1952	Washington Redskins	
Kevin Williams	DT	2004, 2006, 2007, 2008, 2009, 2010	Minnesota Vikings	
Kyle Williams	DT	2010, 2012, 2013, 2014, 2016, 2018	Buffalo Bills	2010—Selected as a replacement for Richard Seymour; 2012—Selected as a replacement for Haloti Ngata; 2016—Selected as a replacement for Ndamukong Suh; 2018—Selected as a replacement for Jurrell Casey
Lee Williams	DE	1988, 1989	San Diego Chargers	
Leonard Williams	DE	2016	New York Jets	
Mario Williams	DE	2008†, 2009†, 2013, 2014	Houston Texans (2008, 2009); Buffalo Bills (2013, 2014)	
Pat Williams	DT	2006, 2007, 2008	Minnesota Vikings	2006—Selected as a replacement for Tommie Harris
Quinnen Williams	DT	2022†	New York Jets	
Ricky Williams	RB	2002#	Miami Dolphins	2002—Named MVP of game
Roy Williams	S	2003, 2004, 2005, 2006, 2007	Dallas Cowboys	
Roy Williams	WR	2006	Detroit Lions	2006—Selected as a replacement for Torry Holt
Tramon Williams	CB	2010‡	Green Bay Packers	2010—Selected as a replacement for Asante Samuel, did not play in the Pro Bowl because the Packers advanced to Super Bowl XLV
Trent Williams	OT	2012‡, 2013, 2014, 2015, 2016†, 2017†‡, 2018‡, 2020†, 2021†‡, 2022†	Washington Redskins/Football Team (2012–2018, 2020, 2021) San Francisco 49ers (2022)	2012—Did not play in the Pro Bowl due to injury 2017—Did not play in the Pro Bowl due to injury 2018—Did not play in the Pro Bowl due to injury 2021—Did not play in the Pro Bowl due to injury
Willie Williams	CB	1969 (NFL)	New York Giants	
Carlton Williamson	SS	1984, 1985	San Francisco 49ers	
Fred Williamson	DB	1961 (AFL), 1962 (AFL), 1963 (AFL)	Oakland Raiders	
Bill Willis	DT	1950, 1951, 1952	Cleveland Browns	
Patrick Willis	LB	2007†, 2008†, 2009‡, 2010, 2011†, 2012‡, 2013	San Francisco 49ers	2009—Did not play in the Pro Bowl due to injury 2012—Did not play in the Pro Bowl because the 49ers advanced to Super Bowl XLVII
Adrian Wilson	SS	2006, 2008†, 2009†, 2010†, 2011†	Arizona Cardinals	2009—Did not play in the Pro Bowl due to injury
Al Wilson	MLB	2001, 2002, 2003, 2005, 2006‡	Denver Broncos	2006—Did not play in the Pro Bowl due to injury
Billy Wilson	OE	1954#, 1955, 1956, 1957, 1958, 1959	San Francisco 49ers	1954—Named MVP of game
Jerrel Wilson	P	1970, 1971, 1972	Kansas City Chiefs	
Larry Wilson	DB, S	1962 (NFL), 1963 (NFL), 1965 (NFL), 1966 (NFL), 1967 (NFL), 1968 (NFL), 1969 (NFL), 1970	St. Louis Cardinals	
Nemiah Wilson	DB	1967 (AFL)	Denver Broncos	
Otis Wilson	LB	1985	Chicago Bears	
Russell Wilson	QB	2012, 2013‡, 2015#, 2017, 2018, 2019†, 2020, 2021	Seattle Seahawks	2012—Selected as a replacement for Matt Ryan; 2013—Did not play in the Pro Bowl because the Seahawks advanced to Super Bowl XLVIII; 2015—Named MVP of game 2018—Selected as a replacement for Aaron Rodgers; 2021—Selected as a replacement for Tom Brady
Tommy Wilson	HB	1957	Los Angeles Rams	
Wade Wilson	QB	1988	Minnesota Vikings	
Abner Wimberly	DE	1952	Green Bay Packers	
Sammy Winder	RB	1984, 1986	Denver Broncos	
Antoine Winfield Jr.	FS	2021	Tampa Bay Buccaneers	2021—Selected as a replacement for Quandre Diggs
Antoine Winfield	CB	2008, 2009, 2010	Minnesota Vikings	
Jim Winkler	DT	1952	Los Angeles Rams	
Kellen Winslow	TE	1980, 1981, 1982, 1983, 1987	San Diego Chargers	
Kellen Winslow II	TE	2007	Cleveland Browns	2007—Selected as a replacement for Antonio Gates
Jameis Winston	QB	2015	Tampa Bay Buccaneers	2015—Selected as a replacement for Tom Brady
Frank Winters	C	1996	Green Bay Packers	
Tristan Wirfs	OT	2021†‡, 2022	Tampa Bay Buccaneers	2021—Did not play in the Pro Bowl due to injury
Steve Wisniewski	G	1990, 1991, 1992, 1993, 1994, 1995, 1997, 2000	Los Angeles/Oakland Raiders	
Al Wistert	OT, DT	1950	Philadelphia Eagles	
Jason Witten	TE	2004, 2005, 2006, 2007†, 2008†, 2009, 2010†, 2012, 2013, 2014, 2017	Dallas Cowboys	2006—Selected as a replacement for Jeremy Shockey; 2013—Selected as a replacement for Julius Thomas; 2014—Selected as a replacement for Julius Thomas; 2017—Selected as a replacement for Zach Ertz
Tom Wittum	P	1973, 1974	San Francisco 49ers	
Ron Wolfley	ST	1986, 1987, 1988, 1989	St. Louis/Phoenix Cardinals	
Will Wolford	OT	1990, 1992, 1995	Buffalo Bills (1990, 1992); Indianapolis Colts (1995)	
Duane Wood	CB	1963 (AFL)	Kansas City Chiefs	
Eric Wood	C	2015	Buffalo Bills	2015—Selected as a replacement for Ryan Kalil
Willie Wood	DB, S	1962 (NFL), 1964 (NFL), 1965 (NFL), 1966 (NFL), 1967 (NFL), 1968 (NFL), 1969 (NFL), 1970	Green Bay Packers	
Lee Woodall	LB	1995, 1997	San Francisco 49ers	
Tom Woodeshick	RB	1968 (NFL)	Philadelphia Eagles	
LaMarr Woodley	OLB	2009	Pittsburgh Steelers	2009—Selected as a replacement for Brian Cushing
Jerome Woods	FS	2003	Kansas City Chiefs	
Abe Woodson	KR, DB	1959, 1960, 1961 (NFL), 1962 (NFL), 1963 (NFL)	San Francisco 49ers	
Charles Woodson	CB, S	1998, 1999, 2001, 2008†‡, 2009†‡, 2010†‡, 2011†, 2015	Oakland Raiders (1998–2001, 2015); Green Bay Packers (2008–2011)	2008—Did not play in the Pro Bowl due to injury 2009—Did not play in the Pro Bowl due to injury 2010—Did not play in the Pro Bowl because the Packers advanced to Super Bowl XLV
Darren Woodson	S	1994†, 1995, 1996, 1997, 1998	Dallas Cowboys	
Marv Woodson	S	1967 (NFL)	Pittsburgh Steelers	
Rod Woodson	CB, FS, KR	1989, 1990, 1991, 1992, 1993, 1994†, 1996, 1999, 2000†, 2001, 2002	Pittsburgh Steelers (1989–1994, 1996); Baltimore Ravens (1999–2001); Oakland Raiders (2002)	
Damien Woody	C	2002	New England Patriots	2002—Selected as a replacement for Barret Robbins
Tariq Woolen	CB	2022	Seattle Seahawks	
Donnell Woolford	CB	1993	Chicago Bears	
John Wooten	G	1965 (NFL), 1966 (NFL)	Cleveland Browns	
John Wozniak	G	1952	Dallas Texans	
Eric Wright	CB	1984, 1985	San Francisco 49ers	
Ernie Wright	OT	1961 (AFL), 1963 (AFL), 1965 (AFL)	Los Angeles/San Diego Chargers	
K. J. Wright	LB	2016	Seattle Seahawks	2016—Selected as a replacement for Ryan Kerrigan
Louis Wright	CB	1977, 1978, 1979, 1983, 1985	Denver Broncos	
Rayfield Wright	OT	1971, 1972, 1973, 1974, 1975, 1976	Dallas Cowboys	
Frank Wycheck	TE	1998, 1999, 2000	Tennessee Titans	

== Y ==
†—Named as a starter ‡—Did not participate (see notes) #—Named Pro Bowl MVP/co-MVP (or equivalent)

Name	Position	Year(s) selected	Franchise(s) represented	Notes
Marshal Yanda	G	2011†, 2012‡, 2013, 2014, 2015, 2016†‡, 2018†, 2019†	Baltimore Ravens	2012—Did not play in the Pro Bowl due to injury 2016—Did not play in the Pro Bowl due to injury
Ron Yary	OT	1971, 1972, 1973, 1974, 1975, 1976, 1977	Minnesota Vikings	
Garo Yepremian	K	1973#, 1978	Miami Dolphins	1973—Named MVP of game
Bob Young	G	1978, 1979	St. Louis Cardinals	
Bryant Young	DT	1996, 1999, 2001, 2002	San Francisco 49ers	
Buddy Young	HB	1954	Baltimore Colts	
Charle Young	TE	1973, 1974, 1975	Philadelphia Eagles	
Chase Young	DE	2020	Washington Football Team	
Fredd Young	ILB	1984, 1985, 1986, 1987	Seattle Seahawks	
Roynell Young	CB	1981	Philadelphia Eagles	
Steve Young	QB	1992, 1993, 1994†, 1995, 1996, 1997, 1998	San Francisco 49ers	
Vince Young	QB	2006, 2009	Tennessee Titans	2006—Selected as a replacement for Philip Rivers; 2009—Selected as a replacement for Philip Rivers
Jack Youngblood	DE	1973, 1974, 1975, 1976, 1977, 1978, 1979	Los Angeles Rams	
Jim Youngblood	LB	1979	Los Angeles Rams	
Paul "Tank" Younger	FB, LB	1951, 1952, 1953 1955	Los Angeles Rams	

== Z ==
†—Named as a starter ‡—Did not participate (see notes) #—Named Pro Bowl MVP/co-MVP (or equivalent)

Name	Position	Year(s) selected	Franchise(s) represented	Notes
Roger Zatkoff	LB	1954, 1955, 1956	Green Bay Packers	
Bob Zeman	DB	1962 (AFL)	Denver Broncos	
Gary Zimmerman	OT	1987, 1988, 1989, 1992, 1994, 1995, 1996	Minnesota Vikings (1987–1989, 1992); Denver Broncos (1994–1996)	
John Zook	DE	1973	Atlanta Falcons	
Greg Zuerlein	K	2017†‡	Los Angeles Rams	2017—Did not play in the Pro Bowl due to injury
Jeremy Zuttah	C	2016	Baltimore Ravens	2016—Selected as a replacement for Maurkice Pouncey
