= List of Pro Bowl players, I–K =

The following is a list of players, both past and current, who have been selected to play in the NFL's annual Pro Bowl game, beginning with the 1950 season.

Between 1938 and 1942, an NFL all star team played the league champion in the NFL All-Star Game. Participants in these games are not recognized by the NFL as Pro Bowlers, and they are not included in this list. No games were played between 1943 and 1950.

Between 1961 and 1969, the NFL and AFL played separate all-star games. This list includes players who were selected to play in the American Football League All-Star game during that period.

== I ==
†—Named as a starter ‡—Did not participate (see notes) #—Named Pro Bowl MVP/co-MVP (or equivalent)

Name	Position	Year(s) selected	Franchise(s) represented	Notes
Tunch Ilkin	OT	1988, 1989	Pittsburgh Steelers	
Richie Incognito	G	2012, 2015, 2016, 2017	Miami Dolphins (2012); Buffalo Bills (2015–2017)	2012—Selected as a replacement for Marshal Yanda; 2015—Selected as a replacement for Mike Iupati; 2016—Selected as a replacement for Marshal Yanda
Mark Ingram II	RB	2014, 2017, 2019	New Orleans Saints (2014, 2017); Baltimore Ravens (2019)	2014—Selected as a replacement for Marshawn Lynch
Melvin Ingram	DE	2017, 2018, 2019	Los Angeles Chargers	2017—Selected as a replacement for Joey Bosa; 2019—Selected as a replacement for Joey Bosa
LeRoy Irvin	CB	1985, 1986	Los Angeles Rams	
Michael Irvin	WR	1991, 1992, 1993, 1994, 1995	Dallas Cowboys	
Mike Iupati	G	2012‡, 2013, 2014‡, 2015‡	San Francisco 49ers (2012–2014); Arizona Cardinals (2015)	2012—Did not play in the Pro Bowl because the 49ers advanced to Super Bowl XLVII; 2014—Did not play in the Pro Bowl due to injury 2015—Did not play in the Pro Bowl due to injury
Chris Ivory	RB	2015	New York Jets	2015—Selected as a replacement for LeSean McCoy
Larry Izzo	ST	2000, 2002, 2004	Miami Dolphins (2000); New England Patriots (2002, 2004)	

== J ==
†—Named as a starter ‡—Did not participate (see notes) #—Named Pro Bowl MVP/co-MVP (or equivalent)

Name	Position	Year(s) selected	Franchise(s) represented	Notes
Bo Jackson	RB	1990	Los Angeles Raiders	
DeSean Jackson	WR	2009†, 2010‡, 2013	Philadelphia Eagles	2010—Did not play in the Pro Bowl due to injury 2013—Selected as a replacement for Andre Johnson
D'Qwell Jackson	ILB	2014	Indianapolis Colts	2014—Selected as a replacement for Bobby Wagner
Earnest Jackson	RB	1984, 1986	San Diego Chargers (1984); Pittsburgh Steelers (1986)	
Eddie Jackson	FS	2018†, 2019	Chicago Bears	
Frank Jackson	FL	1965 (AFL)	Kansas City Chiefs	
Harold Jackson	WR	1969 (NFL), 1972, 1973, 1975, 1977	Philadelphia Eagles (1969, 1972); Los Angeles Rams (1973, 1975, 1977)	
J. C. Jackson	CB	2021†	New England Patriots	
Jonah Jackson	G	2021	Detroit Lions	2021—Selected as a replacement for Brandon Scherff
Keith Jackson	TE	1988, 1989, 1990, 1992, 1996	Philadelphia Eagles (1988–1990); Miami Dolphins (1992); Green Bay Packers (1996)	
Lamar Jackson	QB	2019†, 2021‡	Baltimore Ravens	2021—Did not play in the Pro Bowl due to injury
Malik Jackson	DT	2017	Jacksonville Jaguars	
Monte Jackson	CB	1976, 1977	Los Angeles Rams	
Rich Jackson	DE	1968 (AFL), 1969 (AFL), 1970	Denver Broncos	
Rickey Jackson	OLB	1983, 1984, 1985, 1986, 1992, 1993	New Orleans Saints	
Steven Jackson	RB	2006, 2009‡, 2010	St. Louis Rams	2009—Did not play in the Pro Bowl due to injury
Tom Jackson	OLB	1977, 1978, 1979	Denver Broncos	
Vincent Jackson	WR	2009, 2011, 2012	San Diego Chargers (2009, 2011); Tampa Bay Buccaneers (2012)	2009—Selected as a replacement for Reggie Wayne; 2011—Selected as a replacement for Wes Welker; 2012—Selected as a replacement for Calvin Johnson
Harry Jacobs	MLB	1965 (AFL), 1969 (AFL)	Buffalo Bills	
Josh Jacobs	RB	2020, 2022	Las Vegas Raiders	
Joe Jacoby	OT	1983, 1984, 1985, 1986	Washington Redskins	
Jeff Jaeger	K	1991	Los Angeles Raiders	
Chick Jagade	FB	1953, 1954	Cleveland Browns (1953); Chicago Bears (1954)	
Craig James	RB	1985	New England Patriots	
Derwin James	FS	2018†, 2021†, 2022†	Los Angeles Chargers	
Dick James	HB	1961 (NFL)	Washington Redskins	
Edgerrin James	RB	1999, 2000, 2004, 2005	Indianapolis Colts	
John James	P	1975, 1976, 1977	Atlanta Falcons	
Robert James	CB	1972, 1973, 1974	Buffalo Bills	
Tommy James	DHB	1953	Cleveland Browns	
Tory James	CB	2004	Cincinnati Bengals	
Al Jamison	T	1961 (AFL), 1962 (AFL)	Houston Oilers	
Tom Janik	S	1965 (AFL), 1967 (AFL)	Buffalo Bills	
Sebastian Janikowski	PK	2011	Oakland Raiders	
J. J. Jansen	LS	2013	Carolina Panthers	
Pete Jaquess	DB	1964 (AFL)	Houston Oilers	
Mike Jarmoluk	DT	1951	Philadelphia Eagles	
Grady Jarrett	DT	2019, 2020	Atlanta Falcons	
Dick Jauron	S	1974	Detroit Lions	
Ron Jaworski	QB	1980	Philadelphia Eagles	
John Jefferson	WR	1978, 1979, 1980, 1982	San Diego Chargers (1978–1980); Green Bay Packers (1982)	
Justin Jefferson	WR	2020, 2021, 2022†	Minnesota Vikings	
Roy Jefferson	WR	1968, 1969, 1971	Pittsburgh Steelers (1968, 1969); Washington Redskins (1971)	
Alshon Jeffery	WR	2013	Chicago Bears	
Haywood Jeffires	WR	1991, 1992, 1993	Houston Oilers	
Alfred Jenkins	WR	1980, 1981	Atlanta Falcons	
Elgton Jenkins	G	2020	Green Bay Packers	
Janoris Jenkins	CB	2016	New York Giants	
Kris Jenkins	DT	2002, 2003, 2006, 2008†	Carolina Panthers (2002, 2003, 2006); New York Jets (2008)	
Malcolm Jenkins	SS	2015, 2017‡, 2018	Philadelphia Eagles	2015—Selected as a replacement for Tyrann Mathieu; 2017—Did not play in the Pro Bowl because the Eagles advanced to Super Bowl LII; 2018—Selected as a replacement for Landon Collins
Mike Jenkins	CB	2009	Dallas Cowboys	2009—Selected as a replacement for Charles Woodson
Brian Jennings	LS	2004, 2011	San Francisco 49ers	
Dave Jennings	P	1978, 1979, 1980, 1982	New York Giants	
Greg Jennings	WR	2010‡, 2011	Green Bay Packers	2010—Did not play in the Pro Bowl because the Packers advanced to Super Bowl XLV
Tim Jennings	CB	2012†, 2013	Chicago Bears	2014—Selected as a replacement for Richard Sherman
Ryan Jensen	C	2021	Tampa Bay Buccaneers	
Travis Jervey	ST	1997	Green Bay Packers	
Ron Jessie	WR	1976	Los Angeles Rams	
Bob Jeter	CB	1967 (NFL), 1969 (NFL)	Green Bay Packers	
Billy Joe	FB	1965 (AFL)	Buffalo Bills	
Andre Johnson	WR	2004, 2006, 2008†, 2009†, 2010‡, 2012†, 2013‡	Houston Texans	2010—Did not play in the Pro Bowl due to injury 2013—Did not play in the Pro Bowl due to injury
Bill Johnson	C	1952, 1953	San Francisco 49ers	
Billy Johnson	KR	1975, 1977, 1983	Houston Oilers (1975, 1977); Atlanta Falcons (1983)	
Bob Johnson	C	1968 (AFL)	Cincinnati Bengals	
Brad Johnson	QB	1999, 2002	Washington Redskins (1999); Tampa Bay Buccaneers (2002)	
Calvin Johnson	WR	2010†, 2011‡, 2012‡, 2013‡, 2014‡, 2015‡	Detroit Lions	2011—Did not play in the Pro Bowl due to injury 2012—Did not play in the Pro Bowl due to injury 2013—Did not play in the Pro Bowl due to injury 2014—Did not play in the Pro Bowl due to injury 2015—Did not play in the Pro Bowl due to injury
Chad Johnson	WR	2003†, 2004, 2005, 2006, 2007, 2009	Cincinnati Bengals	2007—Selected as a replacement for Randy Moss; 2009—Selected as a replacement for Wes Welker
Charley Johnson	QB	1963 (NFL)	St. Louis Cardinals	
Charlie Johnson	DT	1979, 1980, 1981	Philadelphia Eagles	
Chris Johnson	RB	2008‡, 2009†, 2010	Tennessee Titans	2008—Did not play in the Pro Bowl due to injury 2010—Selected as a replacement for Maurice Jones-Drew
Curley Johnson	P	1965 (AFL)	New York Jets	
David Johnson	RB	2016	Arizona Cardinals	
Derrick Johnson	LB	2011, 2012, 2013, 2015	Kansas City Chiefs	
Diontae Johnson	WR	2021	Pittsburgh Steelers	2021—Selected as a replacement for Ja'Marr Chase
Ezra Johnson	DE	1978	Green Bay Packers	
Gary Johnson	DT	1979, 1980, 1981, 1982	San Diego Chargers	
Jimmy Johnson	CB, S	1969, 1970, 1971, 1972, 1974	San Francisco 49ers	
Joe Johnson	DE	1998, 2000	New Orleans Saints	
John Henry Johnson	HBFB	1954, 1962, 1963, 1964	San Francisco 49ers (1954); Pittsburgh Steelers (1962-1964)	
Johnny Johnson	RB	1990	Phoenix Cardinals	
Keyshawn Johnson	WR	1998, 1999, 2001	New York Jets (1998, 1999); Tampa Bay Buccaneers (2001)	
Lane Johnson	OT	2017‡, 2018, 2019, 2022†	Philadelphia Eagles	2017—Did not play in the Pro Bowl because the Eagles advanced to Super Bowl LII; 2018—Selected as a replacement for Tyron Smith; 2019—Selected as a replacement for David Bakhtiari
Larry Johnson	RB	2005, 2006	Kansas City Chiefs	
Mike Johnson	LB	1989, 1990	Cleveland Browns	
Norm Johnson	K	1984, 1993	Seattle Seahawks (1984); Atlanta Falcons (1993)	
Pepper Johnson	ILB	1990, 1994	New York Giants (1990); Cleveland Browns (1994)	
Pete Johnson	RB	1981	Cincinnati Bengals	
Ron Johnson	RB	1970, 1972	New York Giants	
Rudi Johnson	RB	2004	Cincinnati Bengals	
Tre' Johnson	OG	1999	Washington Redskins	
Vaughan Johnson	LB	1989, 1990, 1991, 1992	New Orleans Saints	
Walter Johnson	DT	1967, 1968, 1969	Cleveland Browns	
Daryl Johnston	FB, RB	1993, 1994	Dallas Cowboys	
Mark Johnston	CB	1961 (AFL)	Houston Oilers	
Charlie Joiner	WR	1976, 1979, 1980	San Diego Chargers	
Aaron Jones	RB	2020	Green Bay Packers	
Adam Jones	CB	2015	Cincinnati Bengals	2015—Selected as a replacement for Patrick Peterson
Bert Jones	QB	1976	Baltimore Colts	
Brent Jones	TE	1992, 1993, 1994, 1995	San Francisco 49ers	
Byron Jones	CB	2018	Dallas Cowboys	
Chandler Jones	DE, OLB	2015‡, 2017†, 2019†, 2021†	New England Patriots (2015); Arizona Cardinals (2017, 2019, 2021)	2015—Did not play in the Pro Bowl due to injury
Chris Jones	DT	2019†‡, 2020†, 2021†‡, 2022†	Kansas City Chiefs	2019—Did not play in the Pro Bowl because the Chiefs advanced to Super Bowl LIV; 2021—Did not play in the Pro Bowl due to injury
Cody Jones	DT	1978	Los Angeles Rams	
Deacon Jones	DE	1964 (NFL), 1965 (NFL), 1966 (NFL), 1967 (NFL), 1968 (NFL) 1969 (NFL), 1970, 1972	Los Angeles Rams (1964–1970); San Diego Chargers (1972)	
Deion Jones	LB	2017	Atlanta Falcons	2017—Selected as a replacement for Luke Kuechly
Dub Jones	HB	1951, 1952	Cleveland Browns	
Ed "Too Tall" Jones	DE	1981, 1982, 1983	Dallas Cowboys	
Henry Jones	S	1992	Buffalo Bills	
Homer Jones	WR	1967, 1968	New York Giants	
Jacoby Jones	RS	2012	Baltimore Ravens	2012—Did not play in the Pro Bowl because the Ravens advanced to Super Bowl XLVII
Julio Jones	WR	2012†, 2014, 2015, 2016†‡, 2017†‡, 2018†‡, 2019†‡	Atlanta Falcons	2014—Did not play in the Pro Bowl due to injury 2016—Did not play in the Pro Bowl because the Falcons advanced to Super Bowl LI; 2017—Did not play in the Pro Bowl due to injury 2018—Did not play in the Pro Bowl due to injury 2019—Did not play in the Pro Bowl due to injury
Mac Jones	QB	2021	New England Patriots	2021—Selected as a replacement for Lamar Jackson
Reshad Jones	SS	2015, 2017†	Miami Dolphins	2015—Selected as a replacement for Reggie Nelson
Rulon Jones	DE	1985, 1986	Denver Broncos	
Sean Jones	DE	1993	Houston Oilers	
Stan Jones	G	1955, 1956, 1957, 1958, 1959, 1960, 1961 (NFL)	Chicago Bears	
Thomas Jones	RB	2008†	New York Jets	
Tony Jones	OT	1999	Denver Broncos	
Walter Jones	OT	1999, 2001, 2002, 2003, 2004, 2005, 2006, 2007, 2008	Seattle Seahawks	2007—Did not play in the Pro Bowl due to injury 2008—Did not play in the Pro Bowl due to injury
Maurice Jones-Drew	RB	2009, 2010‡, 2011†	Jacksonville Jaguars	2010—Did not play in the Pro Bowl due to injury
Cameron Jordan	DE	2013, 2015, 2017, 2018†, 2019†, 2020†, 2021	New Orleans Saints	2015—Selected as a replacement for Chandler Jones
Henry Jordan	DT	1960, 1961 (NFL), 1963 (NFL), 1966 (NFL),	Green Bay Packers	
Lee Roy Jordan	MLB	1967 (NFL), 1968 (NFL), 1969 (NFL), 1973, 1974	Dallas Cowboys	
Steve Jordan	TE	1986, 1987, 1988, 1989, 1990, 1991	Minnesota Vikings	
Davin Joseph	G	2008, 2011	Tampa Bay Buccaneers	2008—Selected as a replacement for Leonard Davis
Johnathan Joseph	CB	2011, 2012†	Houston Texans	
Linval Joseph	DT	2016, 2017	Minnesota Vikings	2016—Selected as a replacement for Aaron Donald; 2017—Selected as a replacement for Fletcher Cox
Les Josephson	HB	1967 (NFL)	Los Angeles Rams	
Don Joyce	DE	1958	Baltimore Colts	
Seth Joyner	OLB	1991, 1993, 1994	Philadelphia Eagles (1991, 1993); Arizona Cardinals (1994)	
Matthew Judon	OLB	2019, 2020, 2021, 2022†	Baltimore Ravens (2019, 2020); New England Patriots (2021, 2022)	
Cato June	LB	2005	Indianapolis Colts	
E. J. Junior	OLB	1984, 1985	St. Louis Cardinals	
Sonny Jurgensen	QB	1961 (NFL), 1964 (NFL), 1966 (NFL), 1967 (NFL), 1969 (NFL)	Philadelphia Eagles (1961); Washington Redskins (1964, 1966, 1967, 1969)	
Kyle Juszczyk	FB	2016†, 2017†, 2018†, 2019†‡, 2020†, 2021†, 2022†	Baltimore Ravens (2016); San Francisco 49ers (2017–2022)	2019—Did not play in the Pro Bowl because the 49ers advanced to Super Bowl LIV

== K ==
†—Named as a starter ‡—Did not participate (see notes) #—Named Pro Bowl MVP/co-MVP (or equivalent)

Name	Position	Year(s) selected	Franchise(s) represented	Notes
Nate Kaeding	K	2006, 2009	San Diego Chargers	2009—Did not play in the Pro Bowl due to injury
Matt Kalil	OT	2012	Minnesota Vikings	2012—Selected as a replacement for Trent Williams
Ryan Kalil	C	2009, 2010, 2011†, 2013, 2015‡	Carolina Panthers	2009—Selected as a replacement for Jonathan Goodwin; 2010—Selected as a replacement for Shaun O'Hara; 2015—Did not play in the Pro Bowl because the Panthers advanced to Super Bowl 50
Alvin Kamara	RB	2017, 2018, 2019, 2020, 2021	New Orleans Saints	2018—Selected as a replacement for Todd Gurley; 2019—Selected as a replacement for Christian McCaffrey
Larry Kaminski	C	1967 (AFL)	Denver Broncos	
Aaron Kampman	DE	2006, 2007†	Green Bay Packers	
Joe Kapp	QB	1969 (NFL)	Minnesota Vikings	
Emil Karas	LB	1961 (AFL), 1962 (AFL), 1963 (AFL)	San Diego Chargers	
Alex Karras	DT	1960, 1961, 1962, 1965	Detroit Lions	
John Kasay	PK	1996	Carolina Panthers	
Karl Kassulke	S	1970	Minnesota Vikings	
Jim Katcavage	DT	1961, 1962, 1963	New York Giants	
Tom Keane	CB	1953	Baltimore Colts	
Jevon Kearse	DE	1999, 2000, 2001	Tennessee Titans	
Tom Keating	DT	1966 (AFL), 1967 (AFL)	Oakland Raiders	
Brett Keisel	DE	2010	Pittsburgh Steelers	2010—Did not play in the Pro Bowl because the Steelers advanced to Super Bowl XLV
Jason Kelce	C	2014, 2016, 2019†, 2020†, 2021†‡, 2022†	Philadelphia Eagles	2016—Selected as a replacement for Alex Mack 2021—Did not play in the Pro Bowl due to injury
Travis Kelce	TE	2015, 2016†, 2017†‡, 2018†‡, 2019†‡, 2020†, 2021, 2022†	Kansas City Chiefs	2017—Did not play in the Pro Bowl due to injury 2018—Did not play in the Pro Bowl; 2019—Did not play in the Pro Bowl because the Chiefs advanced to Super Bowl LIV
Louie Kelcher	DT	1977, 1978, 1980	San Diego Chargers	
Ernie Kellermann	S	1968 (NFL)	Cleveland Browns	
Jim Kelly	QB	1987, 1988, 1990, 1991, 1992	Buffalo Bills	
Leroy Kelly	RB	1966 (NFL), 1967 (NFL), 1968 (NFL), 1969 (NFL), 1970, 1971	Cleveland Browns	
Ryan Kelly	C	2019, 2020, 2021	Indianapolis Colts	2019—Selected as a replacement for Maurkice Pouncey
Jack Kemp	QB	1961 (AFL), 1962 (AFL), 1963 (AFL), 1964 (AFL), 1965 (AFL), 1966 (AFL), 1969 (AFL)	San Diego Chargers (1961); Buffalo Bills (1962–1966, 1969)	
Eric Kendricks	ILB	2019	Minnesota Vikings	2019—Selected as a replacement for Bobby Wagner
Mike Kenn	OT	1980, 1981, 1982, 1983, 1984	Atlanta Falcons	
Cortez Kennedy	DT	1991, 1992, 1993, 1994, 1995, 1996, 1998, 1999	Seattle Seahawks	
Lincoln Kennedy	T	2000, 2001, 2002	Oakland Raiders	
Bill Kenney	QB	1983	Kansas City Chiefs	
Brett Kern	P	2017†, 2018†, 2019†	Tennessee Titans	
Patrick Kerney	DE	2004, 2007†‡	Seattle Seahawks	2007—Did not play in the Pro Bowl due to injury
Ryan Kerrigan	OLB	2012, 2016‡, 2017†, 2018†	Washington Redskins	2012—Selected as a replacement for Aldon Smith; 2016—Did not play in the Pro Bowl due to injury
Brady Keys	CB	1966	Pittsburgh Steelers	
Robert Khayat	PK	1960	Washington Redskins	
Jim Kiick	RB	1968 (AFL), 1969 (AFL)	Miami Dolphins	
Billy Kilmer	QB	1972	Washington Redskins	
Bucko Kilroy	G	1953, 1954, 1955	Philadelphia Eagles	
Terry Kinard	S	1988	New York Giants	
Don Kindt	DB	1953	Chicago Bears	
Kenny King	RB	1980	Oakland Raiders	
Levon Kirkland	ILB	1996, 1997	Pittsburgh Steelers	
George Kittle	TE	2018, 2019†‡, 2021†, 2022†	San Francisco 49ers	2019—Did not play in the Pro Bowl because the 49ers advanced to Super Bowl LIV
Joe Klecko	DE, LDT, NT	1981, 1983, 1984, 1985	New York Jets	
Dick Klein	LDT	1962 (AFL)	Boston Patriots	
Curt Knight	K	1971	Washington Redskins	
Sammy Knight	S	2001	New Orleans Saints	
Johnny Knox	KR	2009	Chicago Bears	
Sam Koch	P	2015	Baltimore Ravens	
Dave Kocourek	TE	1961 (AFL), 1962 (AFL), 1963 (AFL), 1964 (AFL)	San Diego Chargers	
Bill Koman	LB	1962 (NFL), 1964 (NFL)	St. Louis Cardinals	
Ken Konz	DB	1955	Cleveland Browns	
Younghoe Koo	K	2020†	Atlanta Falcons	
Dan Koppen	C	2007	New England Patriots	
Bernie Kosar	QB	1987, 1989	Cleveland Browns	
Ernie Koy Jr.		1967	New York Giants	
Greg Kragen	NT	1989	Denver Broncos	
Jerry Kramer	G	1962, 1963, 1967	Green Bay Packers	
Ron Kramer	E	1962	Green Bay Packers	
Tommy Kramer	QB	1986	Minnesota Vikings	
Paul Krause	S	1964, 1965, 1969, 1971, 1972, 1973, 1974, 1975	Washington Redskins (1964, 1965); Minnesota Vikings (1969, 1971–1975)	
Casey Kreiter	LS	2018	Denver Broncos	
Olin Kreutz	C	2001, 2002, 2003‡, 2004, 2005, 2006‡	Chicago Bears	2003—Did not play in the Pro Bowl due to injury 2006—Did not play in the Pro Bowl due to injury
Dave Krieg	QB	1984, 1988, 1989	Seattle Seahawks	
Bill Krisher	G	1961 (AFL)	Dallas Texans	
Ray Krouse	DT	1954	New York Giants	
Charlie Krueger	DE, DT	1960, 1964 (NFL)	San Francisco 49ers	
Tim Krumrie	NT	1987, 1988	Cincinnati Bengals	
Joe Krupa	DT	1963 (NFL)	Pittsburgh Steelers	
Bob Kuechenberg	G	1974, 1975, 1977, 1978, 1982, 1983	Miami Dolphins	
Luke Kuechly	MLB	2013, 2014, 2015‡, 2016‡, 2017†‡, 2018†‡, 2019‡	Carolina Panthers	2015—Did not play in the Pro Bowl because the Panthers advanced to Super Bowl 50; 2016—Did not play in the Pro Bowl due to injury 2017—Did not play in the Pro Bowl due to injury 2018—Did not play in the Pro Bowl due to injury 2019—Did not play in the Pro Bowl due to injury
John Kuhn	FB	2011‡, 2014, 2015	Green Bay Packers	2011—Did not play in the Pro Bowl due to injury 2015—Selected as a replacement for Marcel Reece
George Kunz	OT	1969 (NFL), 1971, 1972, 1973, 1974, 1975, 1976, 1977	Atlanta Falcons (1969, 1971–1974); Baltimore Colts (1975–1977)	
Cooper Kupp	WR	2021†‡	Los Angeles Rams	2021—Did not play in the Pro Bowl because the Rams advanced to Super Bowl LVI
Jake Kupp	G	1969 (NFL)	New Orleans Saints	
Ted Kwalick	TE	1971, 1972, 1973	San Francisco 49ers	
