= List of Pro Bowl players, S–V =

The following is a list of players, both past and current, who have been selected to play in the NFL's annual Pro Bowl game, beginning with the 1950 season.

Between 1938 and 1942, an NFL all star team played the league champion in the NFL All-Star Game. Participants in these games are not recognized by the NFL as Pro Bowlers, and they are not included in this list. No games were played between 1943 and 1950.

Between 1961 and 1969, the NFL and AFL played separate all-star games. This list includes players who were selected to play in the American Football League All-Star game during that period.

== S ==
†—Named as a starter ‡—Did not participate (see notes) #—Named Pro Bowl MVP/co-MVP (or equivalent)

Name	Position	Year(s) selected	Franchise(s) represented	Notes
Rodger Saffold	G	2021	Tennessee Titans	2021—Selected as a replacement for Quenton Nelson
George Saimes	S	1964 (AFL), 1965 (AFL), 1966 (AFL), 1967 (AFL), 1968 (AFL)	Buffalo Bills	
Dan Saleaumua	DT	1995	Kansas City Chiefs	
Asante Samuel	CB	2007†, 2008‡, 2009†, 2010‡,	New England Patriots (2007); Philadelphia Eagles (2008–2010)	2008—Did not play in the Pro Bowl due to injury 2010—Did not play in the Pro Bowl due to injury
Deebo Samuel	WR	2021	San Francisco 49ers	
Chris Samuels	OT	2001, 2002, 2005, 2006, 2007, 2008‡	Washington Redskins	2008—Did not play in the Pro Bowl due to injury
Barry Sanders	RB	1989, 1990, 1991, 1992, 1993, 1994, 1995, 1996, 1997, 1998	Detroit Lions	
Bob Sanders	S	2005, 2007†‡	Indianapolis Colts	2007—Did not play in the Pro Bowl due to injury
Charlie Sanders	TE	1968 (NFL), 1969 (NFL), 1970, 1971, 1974, 1975, 1976	Detroit Lions	
Deion Sanders	CB	1991, 1992, 1993, 1994, 1996, 1997, 1998, 1999	Atlanta Falcons (1991–1993); San Francisco 49ers (1994); Dallas Cowboys (1996–1999)	
Emmanuel Sanders	WR	2014, 2016	Denver Broncos	2014—Selected as a replacement for Julio Jones; 2016—Selected as a replacement for Amari Cooper
Miles Sanders	RB	2022	Philadelphia Eagles	
Spec Sanders	DB	1950	New York Yanks	
Mike Sandusky	G	1960	Pittsburgh Steelers	
Leo Sanford	LB	1956, 1957	Chicago Cardinals	
Jesse Sapolu	C, G	1993†, 1994	San Francisco 49ers	
Warren Sapp	DT	1997, 1998, 1999, 2000, 2001, 2002, 2003	Tampa Bay Buccaneers	
Jeff Saturday	C	2005, 2006, 2007, 2009, 2010, 2012	Indianapolis Colts (2005–2007, 2009, 2010); Green Bay Packers (2012)	
George Sauer Jr.	WR	1966 (AFL), 1967 (AFL), 1968 (AFL), 1969 (AFL)	New York Jets	
Todd Sauerbrun	P	2001, 2002, 2003	Carolina Panthers	
Rich Saul	C	1976, 1977, 1978, 1979, 1980, 1981	Los Angeles Rams	
Gale Sayers	HB	1965, 1966, 1967, 1969	Chicago Bears	
Bob Scarpitto	WR	1966 (AFL)	Denver Broncos	
Dick Schafrath	LT	1963, 1964, 1965, 1966, 1967, 1968	Cleveland Browns	
Matt Schaub	QB	2009†#, 2012	Houston Texans	2009—Selected as a replacement for Tom Brady; 2009—Named MVP of game
Brandon Scherff	G	2016‡, 2017, 2019‡, 2020†, 2021†‡	Washington Redskins/Football Team	2016—Did not play in the Pro Bowl due to injury 2017—Did not play in the Pro Bowl due to injury 2019—Did not play in the Pro Bowl due to injury 2021—Did not play in the Pro Bowl due to injury
Mark Schlereth	G	1991, 1998	Washington Redskins (1991); Denver Broncos (1998)	
Bob Schmidt	C	1961 (AFL), 1962 (AFL), 1963 (AFL)	Houston Oilers	
Henry Schmidt	DT	1965 (AFL)	Buffalo Bills	
Joe Schmidt	LB	1954, 1955, 1956, 1957, 1958, 1959, 1960, 1961, 1962, 1963	Detroit Lions	
Mike Schneck	LS	2005	Buffalo Bills	
Bob Schnelker	TE	1958, 1959	New York Giants	
Otto Schnellbacher	DB	1950, 1951	New York Giants	
Aaron Schobel	DE	2006, 2007	Buffalo Bills	2007—Selected as a replacement for Jason Taylor
Joe Schobert	LB	2017	Cleveland Browns	2017—Selected as a replacement for Ryan Shazier
Marty Schottenheimer	LB	1965 (AFL)	Buffalo Bills	
Jim Schrader	C	1958, 1959, 1961	Washington Redskins	
Gene Schroeder	WR	1952	Chicago Bears	
Jay Schroeder	QB	1986	Washington Redskins	
Harry Schuh	T	1967 (AFL), 1969 (AFL)	Oakland Raiders	
Lance Schulters	S	1999	San Francisco 49ers	
Jim Schwantz	LB	1996	Dallas Cowboys	
Joe Scibelli	G	1968	Los Angeles Rams	
Bart Scott	ILB	2006	Baltimore Ravens	
Clarence Scott	CB	1973	Cleveland Browns	
Herbert Scott	G	1979, 1980, 1981	Dallas Cowboys	
Jake Scott	FS	1971, 1972, 1973, 1974, 1975	Miami Dolphins	
Todd Scott	SS	1992	Minnesota Vikings	
Tom Scott	LB	1957, 1958	Philadelphia Eagles	
Joe Scudero	LS	1955	Washington Redskins	
Leon Searcy	OT	1999	Jacksonville Jaguars	
Junior Seau	LB	1991, 1992, 1993, 1994, 1995, 1996, 1997, 1998, 1999, 2000, 2001, 2002	San Diego Chargers	
Mike Sellers	FB	2008	Washington Redskins	
Ron Sellers	WR	1969 (AFL)	Boston Patriots	
Lee Roy Selmon	DE	1979, 1980, 1981, 1982, 1983, 1984	Tampa Bay Buccaneers	
Joe Senser	TE	1981	Minnesota Vikings	
Rafael Septién	PK	1981	Dallas Cowboys	
Tom Sestak	DT	1962 (AFL), 1963 (AFL), 1964 (AFL), 1965 (AFL)	Buffalo Bills	
John Settle	RB	1988	Atlanta Falcons	
Harley Sewell	G	1957, 1958, 1959, 1962	Detroit Lions	
Richard Seymour	DT	2002, 2003, 2004, 2005, 2006‡, 2010‡, 2011‡	New England Patriots (2002–2006); Oakland Raiders (2010, 2011)	2006—Did not play in the Pro Bowl due to injury 2010—Did not play in the Pro Bowl due to injury
Ronnie Shanklin	WR	1973	Pittsburgh Steelers	
Luis Sharpe	OT	1987, 1988, 1989	St. Louis/Phoenix Cardinals	
Shannon Sharpe	TE	1992, 1993, 1994, 1995, 1996, 1997, 1998, 2001	Denver Broncos (1992–1998); Baltimore Ravens (2001)	
Sterling Sharpe	WR	1989, 1990, 1992, 1993, 1994	Green Bay Packers	
Darren Sharper	S	2000, 2002, 2005, 2007†, 2009‡,	Green Bay Packers (2000, 2002); Minnesota Vikings (2005, 2007); New Orleans Saints (2009)	2009—Did not play in the Pro Bowl because the Saints advanced to Super Bowl XLIV
Billy Shaw	G	1962 (AFL), 1963 (AFL), 1964 (AFL), 1965 (AFL), 1966 (AFL), 1967 (AFL), 1968 (AFL), 1969 (AFL)	Buffalo Bills	
Bob Shaw	OE	1950	Chicago Cardinals	
Ryan Shazier	OLB	2016†, 2017‡	Pittsburgh Steelers	2016—Selected as a replacement for C. J. Mosley; 2017—Did not play in the Pro Bowl due to injury
Art Shell	OT	1972, 1973, 1974, 1975, 1976, 1977, 1978, 1980	Oakland Raiders	
Donnie Shell	S	1978, 1979, 1980, 1981, 1982	Pittsburgh Steelers	
Elbert Shelley	S	1992, 1993, 1994, 1995	Atlanta Falcons	
Jerry Sherk	DT	1973, 1974, 1975, 1976	Cleveland Browns	
Lito Sheppard	CB	2004, 2006‡	Philadelphia Eagles	2006—Did not play in the Pro Bowl due to injury
Anthony Sherman	FB	2018†	Kansas City Chiefs	
Richard Sherman	CB	2013, 2014, 2015, 2016, 2019†‡	Seattle Seahawks (2013–2016); San Francisco 49ers (2019)	2019—Did not play in the Pro Bowl because the 49ers advanced to Super Bowl LIV
Will Sherman	S	1955, 1958	Los Angeles Rams	
Sam Shields	CB	2014	Green Bay Packers	
Will Shields	G	1995, 1996, 1997, 1998, 1999, 2000, 2001, 2002, 2003, 2004, 2005, 2006	Kansas City Chiefs	
Jerry Shipkey	LB	1950, 1951, 1952	Pittsburgh Steelers	
Jeremy Shockey	TE	2002, 2003, 2005, 2006‡	New York Giants	2006—Did not play in the Pro Bowl due to injury
Del Shofner	OE	1958, 1959, 1961 (NFL), 1962 (NFL), 1963 (NFL)	Los Angeles Rams (1958, 1959); New York Giants (1961–1963)	
Chuck Shonta	DB	1966 (AFL)	Boston Patriots	
Kawann Short	DT	2015‡, 2018	Carolina Panthers	2015—Did not play in the Pro Bowl because the Panthers advanced to Super Bowl 50; 2018—Selected as a replacement for Aaron Donald
Mickey Shuler	TE	1986, 1988	New York Jets	
Jeff Siemon	LB	1973, 1975, 1976, 1977	Minnesota Vikings	
Vai Sikahema	KR	1986, 1987	St. Louis Cardinals	
Sam Silas	DE	1965	St. Louis Cardinals	
Clyde Simmons	DE	1991, 1992	Philadelphia Eagles	
Jack Simmons	C	1956	Chicago Cardinals	
Jeffery Simmons	DT	2021, 2022	Tennessee Titans	2021—Selected as a replacement for Chris Jones
Justin Simmons	FS	2020	Denver Broncos	
Phil Simms	QB	1985, 1993	New York Giants	
Corey Simon	DT	2003	Philadelphia Eagles	
O. J. Simpson	RB	1972, 1973, 1974, 1975, 1976	Buffalo Bills	
Billy Sims	RB	1980, 1981, 1982	Detroit Lions	
Keith Sims	OG	1993, 1994, 1995	Miami Dolphins	
Michael Sinclair	DE	1996, 1997, 1998	Seattle Seahawks	
Mike Singletary	LB	1983, 1984, 1985, 1986, 1987, 1988, 1989, 1990, 1991, 1992	Chicago Bears	
Brian Sipe	QB	1980	Cleveland Browns	
Jerry Sisemore	OT	1979, 1981	Philadelphia Eagles	
Otis Sistrunk	DT	1974	Oakland Raiders	
Josh Sitton	G	2012, 2014, 2015, 2016	Green Bay Packers (2012, 2014, 2015); Chicago Bears (2016)	
Tom Skladany	P	1981	Detroit Lions	
Bob Skoronski	OT	1966	Green Bay Packers	
Chris Slade	OLB	1997	New England Patriots	
Jackie Slater	OT	1983, 1985, 1986, 1987, 1988, 1989, 1990	Los Angeles Rams	
Matthew Slater	ST	2011‡, 2012, 2013‡, 2014‡, 2015‡, 2016‡, 2017†‡, 2019†, 2020†, 2021†	New England Patriots	2011—Did not play in the Pro Bowl because the Patriots advanced to Super Bowl XLVI; 2014—Did not play in the Pro Bowl because the Patriots advanced to Super Bowl XLIX; 2015—Did not play in the Pro Bowl due to injury 2016—Did not play in the Pro Bowl because the Patriots advanced to Super Bowl LI; 2017—Did not play in the Pro Bowl because the Patriots advanced to Super Bowl LII
Rashawn Slater	OT	2021†	Los Angeles Chargers	
Webster Slaughter	WR	1989, 1993	Cleveland Browns (1989); Houston Oilers (1993)	
Darius Slay	CB	2017, 2018, 2019, 2021, 2022†	Detroit Lions (2017–2019); Philadelphia Eagles (2021, 2022)	
David Sloan	TE	1999	Detroit Lions	
Fred Smerlas	NT	1980, 1981, 1982, 1983, 1988	Buffalo Bills	
Aaron Smith	DE	2004	Pittsburgh Steelers	
Al Smith	LB	1991, 1992	Houston Oilers	
Aldon Smith	OLB	2012‡	San Francisco 49ers	2012—Did not play in the Pro Bowl because the 49ers advanced to Super Bowl XLVII
Alex Smith	QB	2013, 2016†, 2017	Kansas City Chiefs	2013—Selected as a replacement for Tom Brady; 2016—Selected as a replacement for Derek Carr; 2017—Selected as a replacement for Philip Rivers
Antonio Smith	DE	2011	Houston Texans	
Bob Smith	DB	1952	Detroit Lions	
Bobby Smith	RB	1965 (AFL)	Buffalo Bills	
Bruce Smith	DE	1987, 1988, 1989, 1990, 1992, 1993, 1994, 1995, 1996, 1997, 1998	Buffalo Bills	
Bubba Smith	DE	1970, 1971	Baltimore Colts	
Clifton Smith	KR	2008	Tampa Bay Buccaneers	
Dennis Smith	S	1985, 1986, 1989, 1990, 1991, 1993	Denver Broncos	
Detron Smith	FB	1999	Denver Broncos	
Doug Smith	C	1984, 1985, 1986, 1987, 1988, 1989	Los Angeles Rams	
Emmitt Smith	RB	1990, 1991, 1992, 1993, 1994, 1995, 1998, 1999	Dallas Cowboys	
Geno Smith	QB	2022	Seattle Seahawks	
Harrison Smith	FS	2015, 2016†, 2017, 2018, 2019†, 2021	Minnesota Vikings	2015—Selected as a replacement for Earl Thomas; 2017—Selected as a replacement for Landon Collins
J. D. Smith	FB, HB	1959, 1962 (NFL)	San Francisco 49ers	
J. D. Smith	OT	1961 (NFL)	Philadelphia Eagles	
J. T. Smith	KR, WR	1980, 1988	Kansas City Chiefs (1980); Phoenix Cardinals (1988)	
Jackie Smith	TE	1966 (NFL), 1967 (NFL), 1968 (NFL), 1969 (NFL), 1970	St. Louis Cardinals	
Jaylon Smith	ILB	2019	Dallas Cowboys	2019—Selected as a replacement for Luke Kuechly
Jerry Smith	TE	1967, 1969	Washington Redskins	
Jim Ray Smith	G	1958, 1959, 1960, 1961, 1962	Cleveland Browns	
Jimmy Smith	WR	1997, 1998, 1999, 2000, 2001	Jacksonville Jaguars	
John Smith	PK	1980	New England Patriots	
Justin Smith	DE	2009, 2010, 2011, 2012, 2013	San Francisco 49ers	2012—Did not play in the Pro Bowl because the 49ers advanced to Super Bowl XLVII
Marvel Smith	OT	2004	Pittsburgh Steelers	
Neil Smith	DE	1991, 1992, 1993, 1994, 1995, 1997	Kansas City Chiefs (1991–1995); Denver Broncos (1997)	
Paul Smith	DE	1972, 1973	Denver Broncos	
Robert Smith	RB	1998, 2000	Minnesota Vikings	
Rod Smith	WR	2000, 2001, 2005	Denver Broncos	
Ron Smith	DB	1972	Chicago Bears	
Roquan Smith	MLB	2022†	Baltimore Ravens	
Steve Smith	WR	2009	New York Giants	
Steve Smith Sr.	WR	2001, 2005, 2006, 2008, 2011	Carolina Panthers	
Telvin Smith	OLB	2017	Jacksonville Jaguars	2017—Selected as a replacement for Jadeveon Clowney
Tyron Smith	OT	2013, 2014, 2015, 2016†, 2017†‡, 2018†‡, 2019†, 2021‡	Dallas Cowboys	2017—Did not play in the Pro Bowl due to injury 2018—Did not play in the Pro Bowl due to injury 2021—Did not play in the Pro Bowl due to injury
Wade Smith	G	2012	Houston Texans	
Will Smith	DE	2006	New Orleans Saints	
Za'Darius Smith	OLB	2019, 2020†, 2022†	Green Bay Packers (2019, 2020) Minnesota Vikings (2022)	2019—Selected as a replacement for Khalil Mack
JuJu Smith-Schuster	WR	2018	Pittsburgh Steelers	2018—Selected as a replacement for Antonio Brown
Norm Snead	QB	1962, 1963, 1965, 1972	Washington Redskins (1962, 1963); Philadelphia Eagles (1965); New York Giants (1972)	
Chris Snee	OG	2008, 2009, 2010, 2012	New York Giants	
Matt Snell	RB	1964 (AFL), 1966 (AFL), 1969 (AFL)	New York Jets	
Jack Snow	WR	1967	Los Angeles Rams	
Lum Snyder	OT	1953, 1954	Philadelphia Eagles	
Brian Sochia	NT	1988	Miami Dolphins	
Paul Soliai	DT	2011	Miami Dolphins	
Ron Solt	G	1987	Indianapolis Colts	
Gordie Soltau	WR	1951, 1952, 1953	San Francisco 49ers	
Mac Speedie	WR	1950, 1952	Cleveland Browns	
Anthony Spencer	OLB	2012	Dallas Cowboys	
Chris Spielman	ILB	1989, 1990, 1991, 1994	Detroit Lions	
Takeo Spikes	LB	2003, 2004	Buffalo Bills	
C. J. Spiller	RB	2012	Buffalo Bills	
Art Spinney	G	1959, 1960	Baltimore Colts	
Shawn Springs	CB	1998	Seattle Seahawks	
Ed Sprinkle	DE	1950, 1951, 1952, 1954	Chicago Bears	
Darren Sproles	KR, RB	2014, 2015, 2016,	Philadelphia Eagles	2016—Selected as a replacement for Devonta Freeman[
Bob St. Clair	OT	1956, 1958 1959, 1960, 1961 (NFL)	San Francisco 49ers	
Len St. Jean	G	1966 (AFL)	Boston Patriots	
Ken Stabler	QB	1973, 1974, 1976, 1977	Oakland Raiders	
Billy Stacy	S	1961	St. Louis Cardinals	
Matthew Stafford	QB	2014	Detroit Lions	2014—Named MVP of game
Joe Staley	OT	2011†, 2012‡, 2013‡, 2014, 2015, 2017	San Francisco 49ers	2012—Did not play in the Pro Bowl because the 49ers advanced to Super Bowl XLVII; 2013—Did not play in the Pro Bowl due to injury 2017—Selected as a replacement for Tyron Smith
Larry Stallings	OLB	1970	St. Louis Cardinals	
John Stallworth	WR	1979, 1982, 1984	Pittsburgh Steelers	
Norm Standlee	LB	1950	San Francisco 49ers	
Dick Stanfel	G	1953, 1955, 1956, 1957, 1958	Detroit Lions (1953, 1955); Washington Redskins (1956–1958)	
Bill Stanfill	DE	1969 (AFL), 1971, 1972, 1973, 1974	Miami Dolphins	
Ronnie Stanley	OT	2019†	Baltimore Ravens	
Rohn Stark	P	1985, 1986, 1990, 1992	Indianapolis Colts	
Randy Starks	DL	2010, 2012	Miami Dolphins	
Bart Starr	QB	1960, 1961, 1962, 1966	Green Bay Packers	
Roger Staubach	QB	1971, 1975, 1976, 1977, 1978, 1979	Dallas Cowboys	
Ernie Stautner	DT	1952, 1953, 1955, 1956#, 1957, 1958, 1959, 1960, 1961 (NFL)	Pittsburgh Steelers	1956—Named Outstanding Lineman of game
Joel Steed	NT	1997	Pittsburgh Steelers	
Greg Stemrick	CB	1980	Houston Oilers	
Jan Stenerud	K	1970, 1971, 1975, 1984	Kansas City Chiefs (1970, 1971, 1975); Minnesota Vikings (1984)	
John Stephens	RB	1988	New England Patriots	
Dwight Stephenson	C	1983, 1984, 1985, 1986, 1987	Miami Dolphins	
Mark Stepnoski	C	1992, 1993, 1994, 1995, 1996	Dallas Cowboys (1992–1994); Houston Oilers (1995, 1996)	
Todd Steussie	OT	1997, 1998	Minnesota Vikings	
Darian Stewart	S	2016	Denver Broncos	2016—Selected as a replacement for Eric Berry
Jonathan Stewart	RB	2015‡	Carolina Panthers	2015—Did not play in the Pro Bowl because the Panthers advanced to Super Bowl 50
Kordell Stewart	QB	2001	Pittsburgh Steelers	
Art Still	DE	1980, 1981, 1982, 1984	Kansas City Chiefs	
Gary Stills	LB	2003	Kansas City Chiefs	
Jon Stinchcomb	OT	2009	New Orleans Saints	2009—Did not play in the Pro Bowl because the Saints advanced to Super Bowl XLIV
Bill Stits	S	1954	Detroit Lions	
Donnie Stone	RB	1961 (AFL)	Denver Broncos	
Ron Stone	G	2000, 2001, 2002	New York Giants (2000, 2001); San Francisco 49ers (2002)	
Jerry Stovall	DB	1966, 1967, 1969	St. Louis Cardinals	
Matt Stover	K	2000	Baltimore Ravens	
Michael Strahan	DE	1997, 1998, 1999, 2001, 2002, 2003, 2005	New York Giants	
Mike Stratton	LB	1963 (AFL), 1964 (AFL), 1965 (AFL), 1966 (AFL), 1967 (AFL), 1968 (AFL)	Buffalo Bills	
Larry Strickland	C	1956	Chicago Bears	
Korey Stringer	OT	2000	Minnesota Vikings	
Mack Strong	FB	2005, 2006	Seattle Seahawks	
Jack Stroud	RG	1955, 1957, 1960	New York Giants	
Marcus Stroud	DT	2003, 2004, 2005	Jacksonville Jaguars	
Johnny Strzykalski	HB	1950	San Francisco 49ers	
Dana Stubblefield	DT	1994, 1995, 1997	San Francisco 49ers	
Darrell Stuckey	S	2014	San Diego Chargers	
Pat Studstill	WR	1965, 1966	Detroit Lions	
Scott Studwell	LB	1987, 1988	Minnesota Vikings	
Jerry Sturm	C, RG,	1964 (AFL), 1966 (AFL)	Denver Broncos	
Leo Sugar	DE	1958, 1960	Chicago/St. Louis Cardinals	
Terrell Suggs	OLB	2004, 2006, 2008, 2010†, 2011‡, 2013, 2017	Baltimore Ravens	2011—Did not play in the Pro Bowl due to injury
Walter Suggs	OT	1967 (AFL), 1968 (AFL)	Houston Oilers	
Ndamukong Suh	DT	2010‡, 2012, 2013, 2014, 2016†	Detroit Lions (2010, 2012–2014); Miami Dolphins (2016)	2010—Did not play in the Pro Bowl due to injury 2012—Selected as a replacement for Justin Smith
Milt Sunde	G	1966 (NFL)	Minnesota Vikings	
Patrick Surtain	CB	2002, 2003, 2004	Miami Dolphins	
Patrick Surtain II	CB	2022†	Denver Broncos	
Courtland Sutton	WR	2019	Denver Broncos	2019—Selected as a replacement for DeAndre Hopkins
Bill Svoboda	LB	1953	Chicago Cardinals	
Eric Swann	DT	1995, 1996	Arizona Cardinals	
Lynn Swann	WR	1975, 1977, 1978	Pittsburgh Steelers	
Josh Sweat	DE	2021	Philadelphia Eagles	2021—Selected as a replacement for Nick Bosa
Walt Sweeney	G	1964 (AFL), 1965 (AFL), 1966 (AFL), 1967 (AFL), 1968 (AFL), 1969 (AFL), 1970, 1971, 1972	San Diego Chargers	
Bob Swenson	LB	1981	Denver Broncos	
Pat Swilling	LB	1989, 1990, 1991, 1992, 1993	New Orleans Saints (1989–1992); Detroit Lions (1993)	
Dick Szymanski	C	1955, 1962, 1964	Baltimore Colts	

== T ==
†—Named as a starter ‡—Did not participate (see notes) #—Named Pro Bowl MVP/co-MVP (or equivalent)

Name	Position	Year(s) selected	Franchise(s) represented	Notes
Bob Talamini	G	1962 (AFL), 1963 (AFL), 1964 (AFL), 1965 (AFL), 1966 (AFL), 1967 (AFL)	Houston Oilers	
Diron Talbert	DT	1974	Washington Redskins	
George Taliaferro	HB	1951, 1952, 1953	New York Yanks (1951); Dallas Texans (1952); Baltimore Colts (1953)	
Mike Taliaferro	QB	1969 (AFL)	Boston Patriots	
Aqib Talib	CB	2013, 2014, 2015‡, 2016†, 2017	New England Patriots (2013); Denver Broncos (2014–2017)	2015—Did not play in the Pro Bowl because the Broncos advanced to Super Bowl 50
Darryl Talley	LB	1990, 1991	Buffalo Bills	
Ryan Tannehill	QB	2019	Tennessee Titans	2019—Selected as a replacement for Patrick Mahomes
Fran Tarkenton	QB	1964, 1965, 1967, 1968, 1969, 1970, 1974, 1975, 1976	Minnesota Vikings (1964, 1965, 1974–1976); New York Giants (1967–1970)	
Steve Tasker	ST	1987, 1990, 1991, 1992, 1993, 1994, 1995	Buffalo Bills	1992—Named MVP of game
Golden Tate	WR	2014	Detroit Lions	
Jack Tatum	FS	1973, 1974, 1975	Oakland Raiders	
Lofa Tatupu	MLB	2005, 2006, 2007	Seattle Seahawks	
Mosi Tatupu	RB	1986	New England Patriots	
Bobby Taylor	CB	2002	Philadelphia Eagles	
Bruce Taylor	CB	1972	San Francisco 49ers	
Charley Taylor	WR, HB	1964, 1965, 1966, 1967, 1972, 1973, 1974, 1975	Washington Redskins	
Fred Taylor	RB	2007	Jacksonville Jaguars	
Jason Taylor	DE	2000, 2002, 2004, 2005, 2006, 2007	Miami Dolphins	
Jim Taylor	FB	1960, 1961, 1962, 1963, 1964	Green Bay Packers	
John Taylor	KR	1988, 1989	San Francisco 49ers	
Jonathan Taylor	RB	2021†	Indianapolis Colts	
Hugh Taylor	E	1952, 1954	Washington Redskins	
Lawrence Taylor	LB	1981, 1982, 1983, 1984, 1985, 1986, 1987, 1988, 1989, 1990	New York Giants	
Lionel Taylor	WR	1961 (AFL), 1962 (AFL), 1965 (AFL)	Denver Broncos	
Otis Taylor	WR	1971, 1972	Kansas City Chiefs	
Roosevelt Taylor	S	1963, 1968	Chicago Bears	
Sean Taylor	FS	2006, 2007	Washington Redskins	
Tyrod Taylor	QB	2015	Buffalo Bills	
Wyatt Teller	G	2021	Cleveland Browns	
Marvin Terrell	G	1962 (AFL)	Dallas Texans	
Vinny Testaverde	QB	1996, 1998	Baltimore Ravens (1996); New York Jets (1998)	
Deral Teteak	MLB	1952	Green Bay Packers	
Joe Theismann	QB	1982, 1983	Washington Redskins	
R. C. Thielemann	G	1981, 1982, 1983	Atlanta Falcons	
Adam Thielen	WR	2017†, 2018	Minnesota Vikings	
Yancey Thigpen	WR	1995, 1997	Pittsburgh Steelers	
Aaron Thomas	TE	1964 (NFL)	New York Giants	
Adalius Thomas	OLB	2003, 2006	Baltimore Ravens	
Clendon Thomas	DB	1963 (NFL)	Pittsburgh Steelers	
Demaryius Thomas	WR	2012, 2013‡, 2014, 2016	Denver Broncos	2012—Selected as a replacement for Wes Welker; 2013—Did not play in the Pro Bowl because the Broncos advanced to Super Bowl XLVIII
Derrick Thomas	OLB	1989, 1990, 1991, 1992, 1993, 1994, 1995, 1996, 1997	Kansas City Chiefs	
Earl Thomas	FS	2011†, 2012†, 2013‡, 2014‡, 2015‡, 2017†, 2019	Seattle Seahawks (2011–2015, 2017); Baltimore Ravens (2019)	2013—Did not play in the Pro Bowl because the Seahawks advanced to Super Bowl XLVIII; 2014—Did not play in the Pro Bowl because the Seahawks advanced to Super Bowl XLIX; 2015—Did not play in the Pro Bowl due to injury
Emmitt Thomas	CB	1968 (AFL), 1971, 1972, 1974, 1975	Kansas City Chiefs	
Eric Thomas	CB	1988	Cincinnati Bengals	
Henry Thomas	DT	1991, 1992	Minnesota Vikings	
J. T. Thomas	DB	1976	Pittsburgh Steelers	
Joe Thomas	OT	2007, 2008, 2009, 2010, 2011, 2012, 2013, 2014, 2015, 2016	Cleveland Browns	
John Thomas	G	1966 (NFL)	San Francisco 49ers	
Julius Thomas	TE	2013‡, 2014‡	Denver Broncos	2013—Did not play in the Pro Bowl because the Broncos advanced to Super Bowl XLVIII; 2014—Did not play in the Pro Bowl due to injury
Michael Thomas	ST	2018	New York Giants	2018—Selected as a replacement for Cory Littleton
Michael Thomas	WR	2017, 2018†‡, 2019†	New Orleans Saints	2018—Did not play in the Pro Bowl due to injury
Mike Thomas	RB	1976	Washington Redskins	
Pat Thomas	CB	1978, 1980	Los Angeles Rams	
Thurman Thomas	RB	1989, 1990, 1991, 1992, 1993	Buffalo Bills	
Tra Thomas	OT	2001, 2002, 2004	Philadelphia Eagles	
William Thomas	LB	1995, 1996	Philadelphia Eagles	
Zach Thomas	MLB	1999, 2000, 2001, 2002, 2003, 2005, 2006	Miami Dolphins	
Bobby Thomason	QB	1953, 1955, 1956	Philadelphia Eagles	
Bennie Thompson	ST	1991, 1998	New Orleans Saints (1991); Baltimore Ravens (1998)	
Bill Thompson	DB	1977, 1978, 1981	Denver Broncos	
Reyna Thompson	ST	1990	New York Giants	
Joe Thuney	G	2022	Kansas City Chiefs	
Pat Tilley	WR	1980	St. Louis Cardinals	
Charles Tillman	CB	2011, 2012	Chicago Bears	
Adam Timmerman	G	2001	St. Louis Rams	
Lawrence Timmons	LB	2014	Pittsburgh Steelers	
Mick Tingelhoff	C	1964, 1965, 1966, 1967, 1968, 1969	Minnesota Vikings	
Andre Tippett	LB	1984, 1985, 1986, 1987, 1988	New England Patriots	
Y. A. Tittle	QB	1953, 1954, 1957, 1959, 1961, 1962, 1963	San Francisco 49ers (1953, 1954, 1957, 1959); New York Giants (1961–1963)	
Robbie Tobeck	C	2005	Seattle Seahawks	
Charlie Tolar	FB	1961 (AFL), 1962 (AFL)	Houston Oilers	
Mike Tolbert	FB	2013, 2015, 2016	Carolina Panthers	2015—Did not play in the Pro Bowl because the Panthers advanced to Super Bowl 50
Tony Tolbert	DE	1996	Dallas Cowboys	
LaDainian Tomlinson	RB	2002, 2004, 2005, 2006, 2007	San Diego Chargers	
Laken Tomlinson	G	2021	San Francisco 49ers	2021—Selected as a replacement for Zack Martin
Bob Toneff		1955, 1959, 1960, 1961	San Francisco 49ers (1955); Washington Redskins (1959–1961)	
Clayton Tonnemaker	RLB	1953	Green Bay Packers	
Al Toon	WR	1986, 1987, 1988	New York Jets	
Laverne Torczon	DE	1961 (AFL)	Buffalo Bills	
LaVern Torgeson	LB	1954, 1955, 1956	Detroit Lions (1954); Washington Redskins (1955–1956)	
Zollie Toth	FB	1950	New York Yanks	
Dan Towler	FB	1951#, 1952, 1953, 1954	Los Angeles Rams	1951—Named MVP of game
Greg Townsend	DE	1990, 1991	Los Angeles Raiders	
Tommy Townsend	P	2022†	Kansas City Chiefs	
John Tracey	LB	1965 (AFL), 1966 (AFL)	Buffalo Bills	
Tom Tracy	HB	1958, 1960	Pittsburgh Steelers	
Brynden Trawick	ST	2017	Tennessee Titans	2017—Selected as a replacement for Matthew Slater
David Treadwell	K	1989	Denver Broncos	
Charley Trippi	QB, HB	1952, 1953	Chicago Cardinals	
Frank Tripucka	QB	1960 (AFL)	Denver Broncos	
Jeremiah Trotter	LB	2000, 2001, 2004, 2005	Philadelphia Eagles	
Mitchell Trubisky	QB	2018	Chicago Bears	2018—Selected as a replacement for Jared Goff
Desmond Trufant	CB	2015	Atlanta Falcons	2015—Selected as a replacement for Josh Norman
Marcus Trufant	CB	2007†	Seattle Seahawks	
Bob Trumpy	TE	1968 (AFL), 1969 (AFL), 1970, 1973	Cincinnati Bengals	
Jerry Tubbs	LB	1962	Dallas Cowboys	
Winfred Tubbs	LB	1998	San Francisco 49ers	
Jessie Tuggle	MLB	1992, 1994, 1995, 1997, 1998	Atlanta Falcons	
Justin Tuck	DE	2008, 2010	New York Giants	
Justin Tucker	K	2013, 2016†, 2019†, 2020†, 2021†, 2022†	Baltimore Ravens	
Mark Tuinei	OT	1994, 1995	Dallas Cowboys	
Emlen Tunnell	DB	1950, 1951, 1952, 1953, 1954, 1955, 1956, 1957, 1959	New York Giants (1950–1957); Green Bay Packers (1959)	
Laremy Tunsil	OT	2019†, 2020†, 2022†	Houston Texans	
Tom Tupa	P	1999	New York Jets	
Matt Turk	P	1996, 1997, 1998	Washington Redskins	
Renaldo Turnbull	LB	1993	New Orleans Saints	
Bake Turner	WR	1963 (AFL)	New York Jets	
Clyde Turner	C	1950, 1951	Chicago Bears	
Cecil Turner	WR	1970	Chicago Bears	
Eric Turner	S	1994, 1996	Cleveland Browns (1994); Baltimore Ravens (1996)	
Jim Turner	K	1968 (AFL), 1969 (AFL)	New York Jets	
Keena Turner	OLB	1984	San Francisco 49ers	
Michael Turner	RB	2008, 2010†	Atlanta Falcons	
Trai Turner	G	2015, 2016†, 2017, 2018, 2019	Carolina Panthers	2015—Did not play in the Pro Bowl because the Panthers advanced to Super Bowl 50; 2017—Selected as a replacement for Zack Martin; 2019—Selected as a replacement for Brandon Brooks
KaVontae Turpin	KR	2022†	Dallas Cowboys	
Rick Tuten	P	1994	Seattle Seahawks	
Wendell Tyler	RB	1984	San Francisco 49ers	
David Tyree	ST	2005	New York Giants	
Jim Tyrer	OT	1962 (AFL), 1963 (AFL), 1964 (AFL), 1965 (AFL), 1966 (AFL), 1968 (AFL), 1969 (AFL), 1970, 1971	Dallas Texans/Kansas City Chiefs	

== U ==
†—Named as a starter ‡—Did not participate (see notes) #—Named Pro Bowl MVP/co-MVP (or equivalent)

Name	Position	Year(s) selected	Franchise(s) represented	Notes
Harry Ulinski	C	1955	Washington Redskins	
Osi Umenyiora	DE	2005, 2007	New York Giants	
Max Unger	C	2012†, 2013‡, 2018‡	Seattle Seahawks (2012, 2013); New Orleans Saints (2018)	2013—Did not play in the Pro Bowl because the Seahawks advanced to Super Bowl XLVIII; 2018—Did not play in the Pro Bowl due to injury
Johnny Unitas	QB	1957, 1958, 1959#, 1960#, 1961 (NFL), 1962 (NFL), 1963 (NFL)#, 1964 (NFL), 1966 (NFL), 1967 (NFL)	Baltimore Colts	1959—Named MVP of game 1960—Named MVP of game 1963—Named MVP of game
Rick Upchurch	KR	1976, 1978, 1979, 1982	Denver Broncos	
Gene Upshaw	G	1968 (AFL), 1972, 1973, 1974, 1975, 1976, 1977	Oakland Raiders	
Brian Urlacher	LB	2000, 2001, 2002, 2003, 2005, 2006, 2010‡, 2011‡	Chicago Bears	2010—Did not play in the Pro Bowl due to injury 2011—Did not play in the Pro Bowl due to injury

== V ==
†—Named as a starter ‡—Did not participate (see notes) #—Named Pro Bowl MVP/co-MVP (or equivalent)

Name	Position	Year(s) selected	Franchise(s) represented	Notes
Norm Van Brocklin	QB	1950, 1951, 1952, 1953, 1954, 1955, 1958, 1959, 1960	Los Angeles Rams(1950–1955); Philadelphia Eagles (1958–1960)	
Bruce Van Dyke	G	1973	Pittsburgh Steelers	
Jeff Van Note	C	1974, 1975, 1979, 1980, 1981, 1982	Atlanta Falcons	
Brad Van Pelt	LB	1976, 1977, 1978, 1979, 1980	New York Giants	
Dick Van Raaphorst	PK	1966 (AFL)	San Diego Chargers	
Kyle Vanden Bosch	DE	2005, 2007, 2009	Tennessee Titans	
Leighton Vander Esch	ILB	2018	Dallas Cowboys	2018—Selected as a replacement for Luke Kuechly
Mike Vanderjagt	K	2003	Indianapolis Colts	
Frank Varrichione	OT	1955, 1957, 1958, 1960, 1962 (NFL)	Pittsburgh Steelers (1955, 1957, 1958, 1960); Los Angeles Rams (1962)	
Nathan Vasher	CB	2005	Chicago Bears	
Louis Vasquez	G	2013	Denver Broncos	2013—Did not play in the Pro Bowl because the Broncos advanced to Super Bowl XLVIII
Vita Vea	OT	2021	Tampa Bay Buccaneers	2021—Selected as a replacement for Aaron Donald
Clarence Verdin	KR	1990, 1992	Indianapolis Colts	
Alterraun Verner	CB	2013	Tennessee Titans	
Olivier Vernon	OLB	2018	New York Giants	2018—Selected as a replacement for Khalil Mack
Michael Vick	QB	2002, 2004, 2005, 2010†	Atlanta Falcons (2002, 2004, 2005); Philadelphia Eagles (2010)	
Alejandro Villanueva	OT	2017†, 2018†	Pittsburgh Steelers	
Phil Villapiano	LB	1973, 1974, 1975, 1976	Oakland Raiders	
Jonathan Vilma	LB	2005, 2009‡, 2010†	New York Jets (2005); New Orleans Saints (2009, 2010)	2009—Did not play in the Pro Bowl because the Saints advanced to Super Bowl XLIV
Adam Vinatieri	PK	2002, 2004, 2014	New England Patriots (2002, 2004); Indianapolis Colts (2014)	
Troy Vincent	CB	1999, 2000, 2001, 2002, 2003	Philadelphia Eagles	
Bob Vogel	OT	1964, 1965, 1967, 1968, 1971	Baltimore Colts	
Rick Volk	S	1967, 1969, 1971	Baltimore Colts	
Mike Vrabel	OLB	2007	New England Patriots	
