= 1968 Pro Bowl =

National Football League all-star game

1968 East–West Pro Bowl
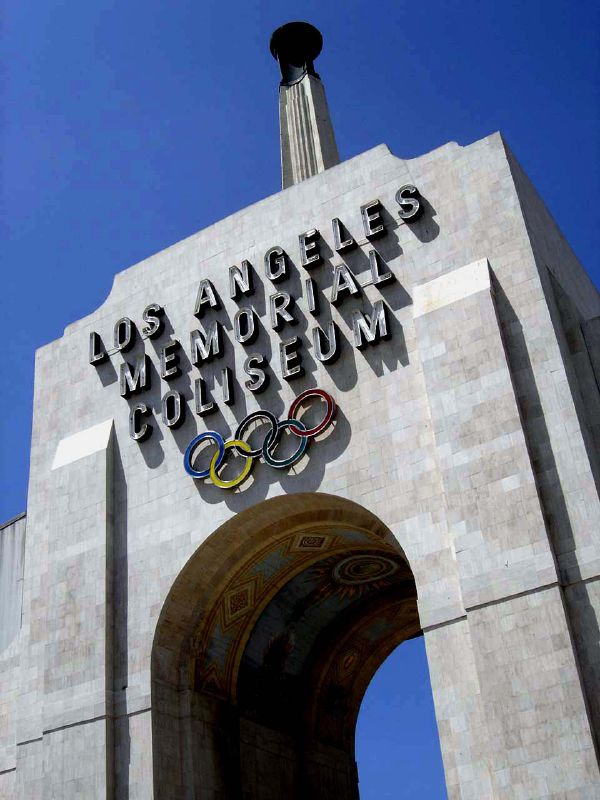
- The front of the L.A. Memorial Coliseum
| Eastern Conference | Western Conference |
|---|---|
| 20 | 38 |
| Head coach: Otto Graham (Washington Redskins) | Head coach: Don Shula (Baltimore Colts) |
| | 1 | 2 | 3 | 4 | Total |
|---|---|---|---|---|---|
| Eastern Conference | 0 | 13 | 7 | 0 | 20 |
| Western Conference | 10 | 7 | 0 | 21 | 38 |
- Date: January 21, 1968
- Stadium: Los Angeles Memorial Coliseum; Los Angeles, California
- Co-MVPs: Gale Sayers (Chicago Bears, RB), Dave Robinson (Green Bay Packers, LB)
- Favorite: West
- Attendance: 53,289

TV in the United States
- Network: CBS
- Announcers: Jack Buck, Tom Brookshier

The 1968 Pro Bowl was the National Football League's eighteenth annual all-star game, which featured the outstanding performers from the 1967 season. The game was played on January 21, 1968, at Los Angeles Memorial Coliseum in Los Angeles, California, United States.

== Victory for the Western Conference ==
Scoring three touchdowns in the fourth quarter, the favored Western Conference rallied for a 38–20 victory, breaking the Eastern Conference's two-game winning streak. Running back Gale Sayers of the Chicago Bears was named the back of the game for the second year in a row and linebacker Dave Robinson of the league champion Green Bay Packers received the lineman of the game honors.

== Controversy over Tarkenton's benching ==
Attendance at the game was 53,289. The game had controversy because East coach Otto Graham of the Washington Redskins benched quarterback Fran Tarkenton of the New York Giants in the fourth quarter. Some players questioned the benching of a player of Tarkenton's stature in a charity game. The coach of the West squad was Don Shula of the Baltimore Colts, who won his second Pro Bowl in four years. The game was played a week after the second Super Bowl, which was held in Miami.
