= 1969 Pro Bowl =

National Football League all-star game

1969 East–West Pro Bowl
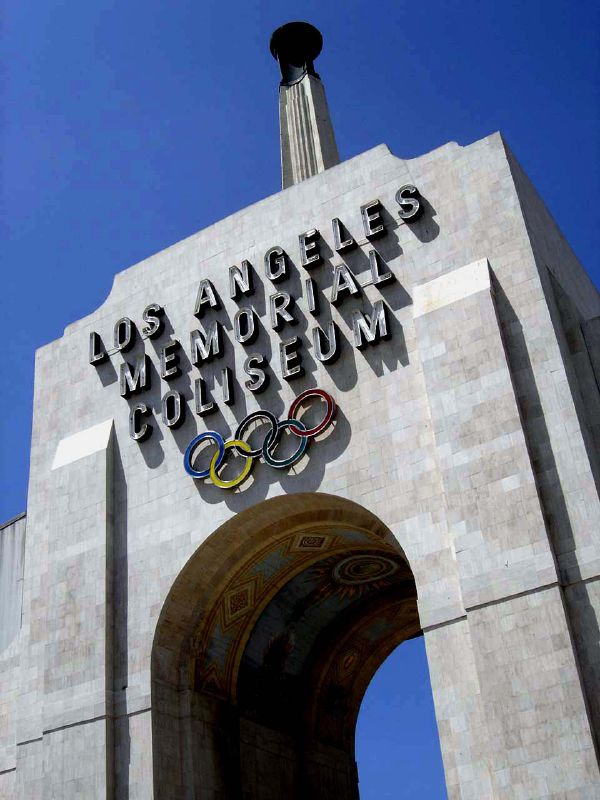
- The front of the L.A. Memorial Coliseum
Eastern Conference	Western Conference
7	10
Head coach: Tom Landry (Dallas Cowboys)	Head coach: George Allen (Los Angeles Rams)
	1	2	3	4	Total
Eastern Conference	0	0	7	0	7
Western Conference	0	3	0	7	10
- Date: January 19, 1969
- Stadium: Los Angeles Memorial Coliseum; Los Angeles, California
- Co-MVPs: Roman Gabriel (Los Angeles Rams, QB), Merlin Olsen (Los Angeles Rams, DT)
- Attendance: 32,050

TV in the United States
- Network: CBS
- Announcers: Jack Whitaker, Pat Summerall

The 1969 Pro Bowl was the NFL's nineteenth annual all-star game which featured the outstanding performers from the 1968 season. The game was played on Sunday, January 19, 1969, at Los Angeles Memorial Coliseum in Los Angeles, California. The final score was West 10, East 7. Defensive tackle Merlin Olsen of the Los Angeles Rams was selected as lineman of the game, and quarterback Roman Gabriel of the Rams received the back of the game award.

Attendance at the game was 32,050 on a cool, rainy afternoon. The game was noteworthy because of the contributions of Rams players and their coach. George Allen, the coach of the Rams, had been fired after the season. But, after a great outcry from the fans, he was rehired by Rams management after the Pro Bowl. The coach of the East was Tom Landry of the Dallas Cowboys. The game ball was presented to Allen due to his trials in the previous weeks.

Both teams had 35 players; the winners earned $1,500 each and losers received $1,000. The game was played a week after the historic Super Bowl III, held in Miami.
