= 1967 Pro Bowl =

National Football League all-star game

1967 East–West Pro Bowl
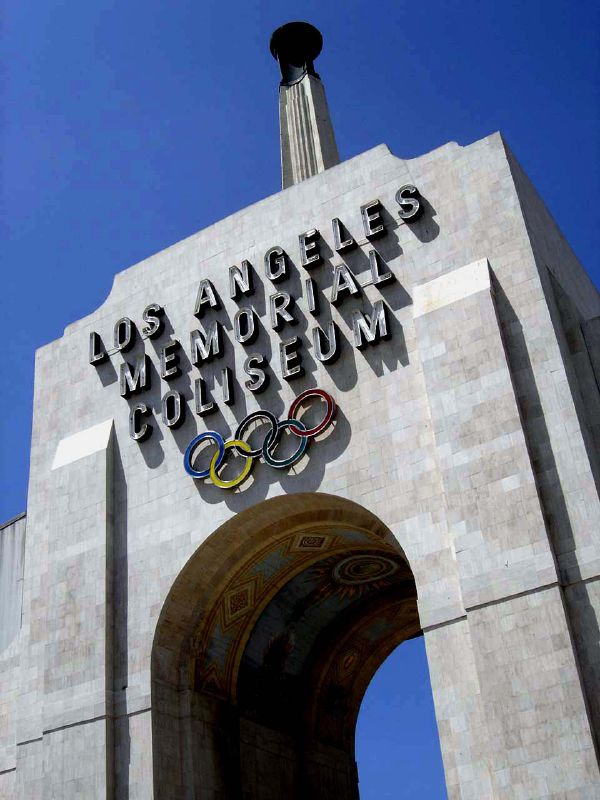
- The front of the L.A. Memorial Coliseum
| Eastern Conference | Western Conference |
|---|---|
| 20 | 10 |
| Head coach: Tom Landry (Dallas Cowboys) | Head coach: George Allen (Los Angeles Rams) |
| | 1 | 2 | 3 | 4 | Total |
|---|---|---|---|---|---|
| Eastern Conference | 6 | 14 | 0 | 0 | 20 |
| Western Conference | 0 | 0 | 3 | 7 | 10 |
- Date: January 22, 1967
- Stadium: Los Angeles Memorial Coliseum; Los Angeles, California
- Co-MVPs: Gale Sayers (Chicago Bears, RB), Floyd Peters (Philadelphia Eagles, DT)
- Favorite: West (slight favorite)
- Attendance: 15,062

TV in the United States
- Network: CBS
- Announcers: Lindsey Nelson, Pat Summerall

The 1967 Pro Bowl was the seventeenth annual National Football League (NFL) all-star game which featured the outstanding performers from the 1966 season. The game was played on January 22, 1967, in a heavy rainstorm at the Los Angeles Memorial Coliseum in Los Angeles, California, before a sparse crowd of 15,062. This was the second-lowest attendance in the history of the Pro Bowl, next to the inaugural game in January 1939, also in Los Angeles.

The head coaches were Tom Landry of the Dallas Cowboys for the East and George Allen of the Los Angeles Rams for the West. The game was played a week after the first Super Bowl, on the same field.

For the second year in a row, the East dominated the West on the strength of turnovers, and won 20–10. They recovered two fumbles and intercepted four passes.

The game proved that the NFL had a successor to the great Jim Brown, the Hall of Fame fullback who retired prior to training camp, with the presence of the Chicago Bears' Gale Sayers, concluding his second NFL season. Sayers rushed for 110 yards on eleven carries and was named back of the game while veteran defensive tackle Floyd Peters of the Philadelphia Eagles was selected as lineman of the game.

Each team consisted of 34 players; the winners received $1,500 each and the losers $900.
