= List of LSU Tigers in the NFL draft =

The LSU Tigers football team has had 358 players drafted into the National Football League (NFL) since the league began holding drafts in 1936. This includes 48 players taken in the first round and three overall number one picks: Billy Cannon (1960), Jamarcus Russell (2007) and Joe Burrow (2020). Six former LSU players have been elected to the Pro Football Hall of Fame: Steve Van Buren, Y. A. Tittle, Jim Taylor, Johnny Robinson, Alan Faneca, and Kevin Mawae. As of the beginning of the 2015 NFL season, there were 40 former LSU players on active rosters in the NFL, the most of any college program.

Each NFL franchise adds new players through the annual NFL draft. The team with the worst record the previous year picks first, the next-worst team second, and so on. Teams that did not make the playoffs are ordered by their regular-season record with any remaining ties broken by strength of schedule. Playoff participants are sequenced after non-playoff teams, based on their round of elimination (wild card, division, conference, and Super Bowl). Prior to the merger agreements in 1966, the American Football League (AFL) operated in direct competition with the NFL and held a separate draft. This led to a bidding war over top prospects between the two leagues. As part of the merger agreement on June 8, 1966, the two leagues held a multiple round "Common Draft". Once the AFL officially merged with the NFL in 1970, the "Common Draft" became the NFL Draft.

== Key ==
B	Back	K	Kicker	NT	Nose tackle
C	Center	LB	Linebacker	FB	Fullback
DB	Defensive back	P	Punter	HB	Halfback
DE	Defensive end	QB	Quarterback	WR	Wide receiver
DT	Defensive tackle	RB	Running back	G	Guard
E	End	T	Offensive tackle	TE	Tight end

^{*}	Inducted into Pro Football Hall of Fame

== NFL and AFL selections ==
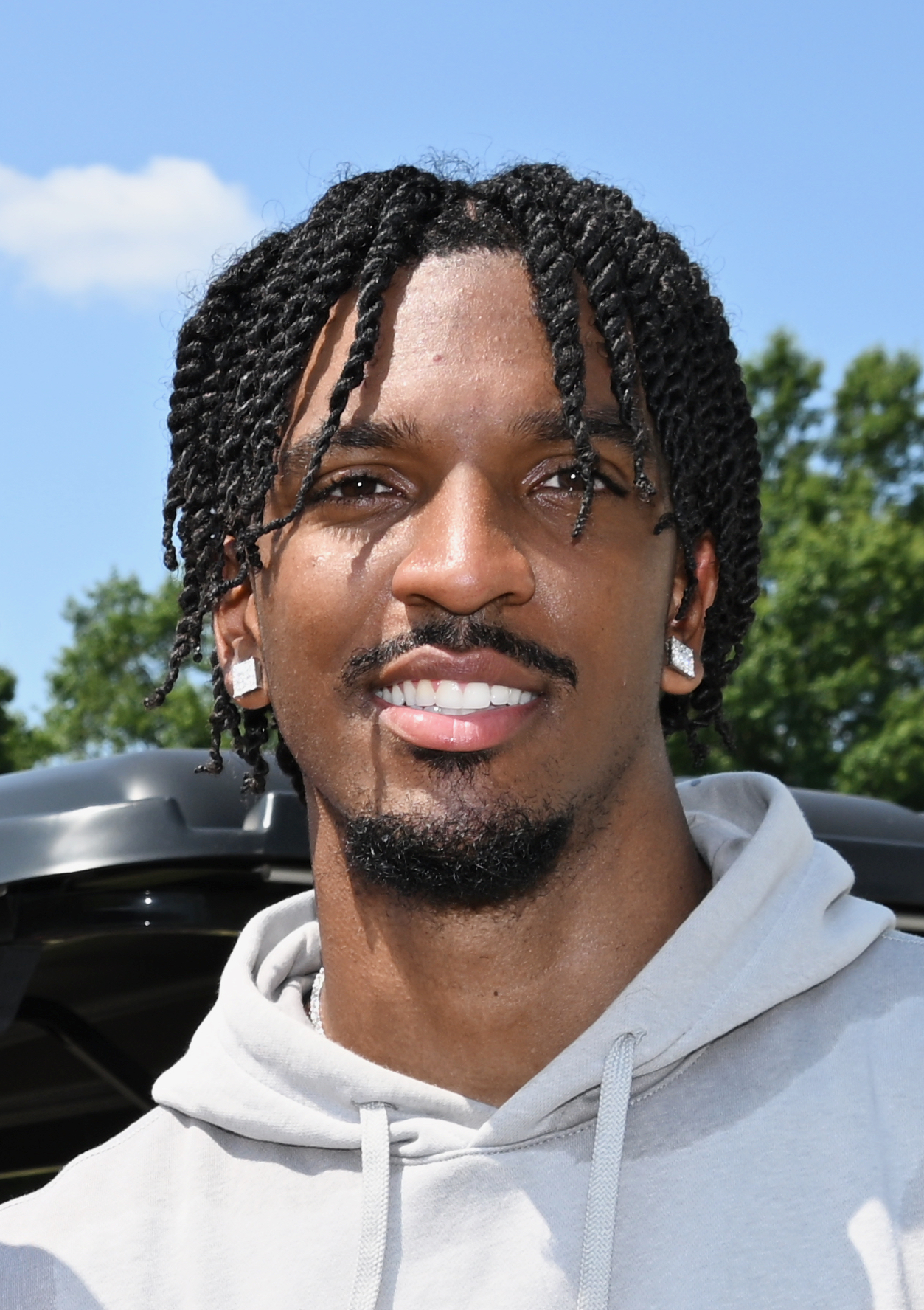
Jayden Daniels was drafted 2nd overall by the Washington Commanders in 2024.

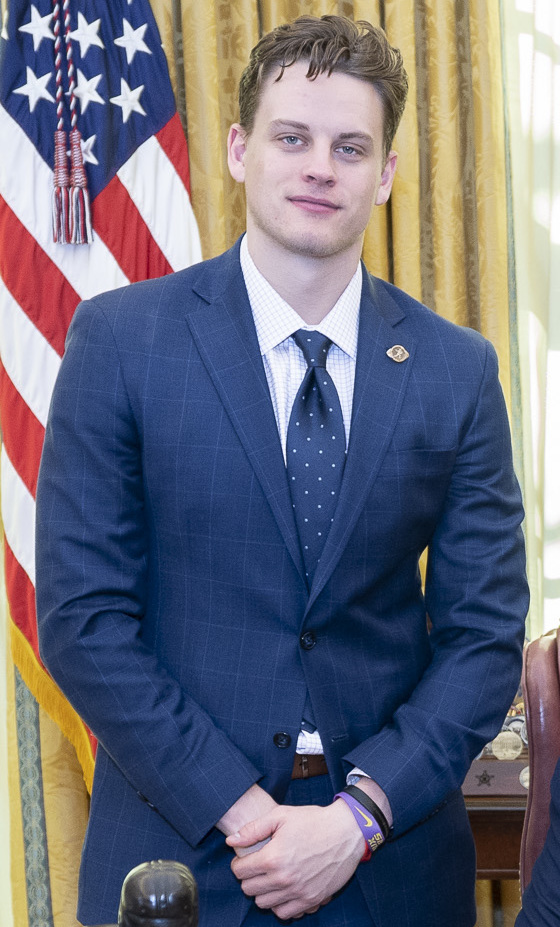
Joe Burrow was drafted 1st overall by the Cincinnati Bengals in 2020.

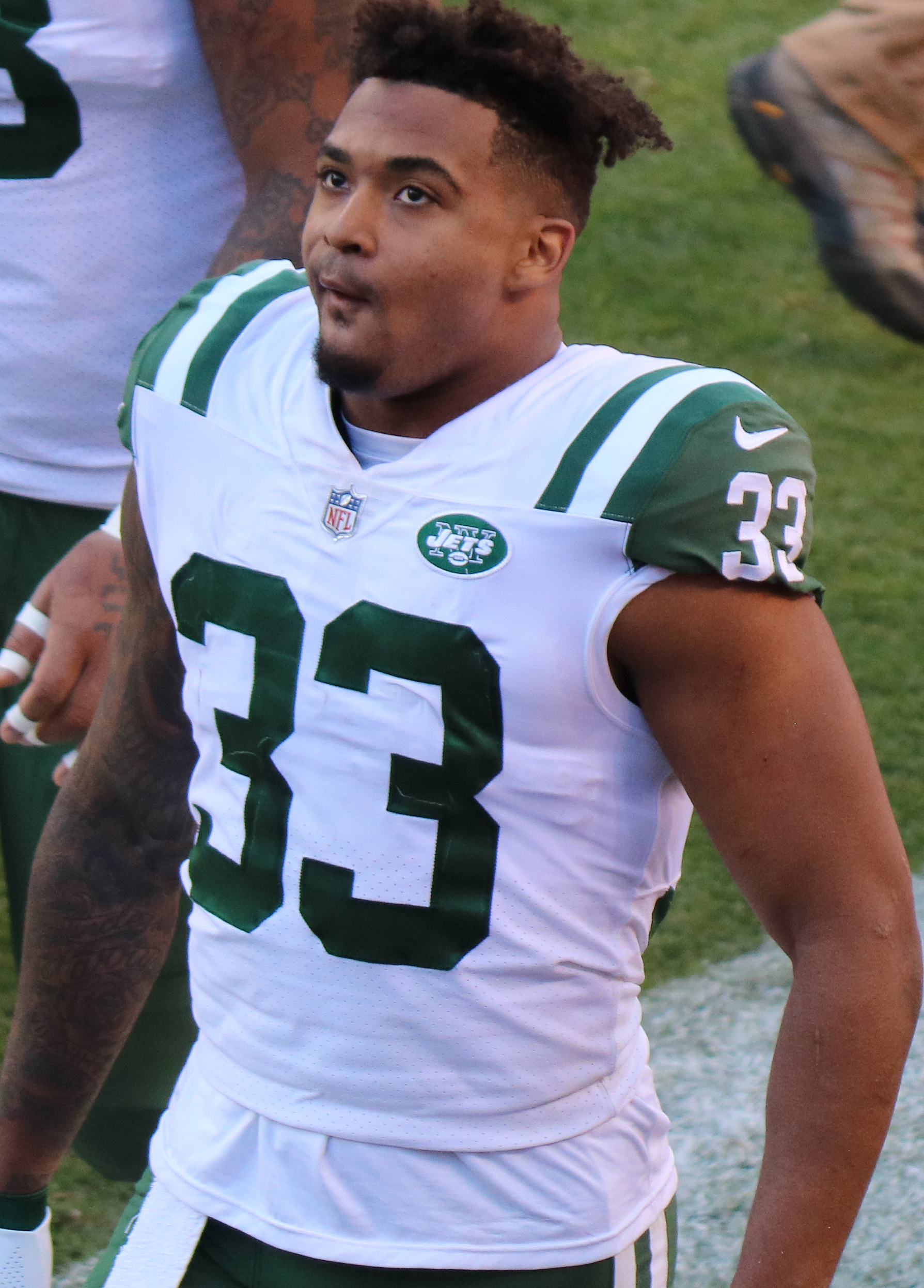
Jamal Adams was drafted 6th overall by the New York Jets in 2017.

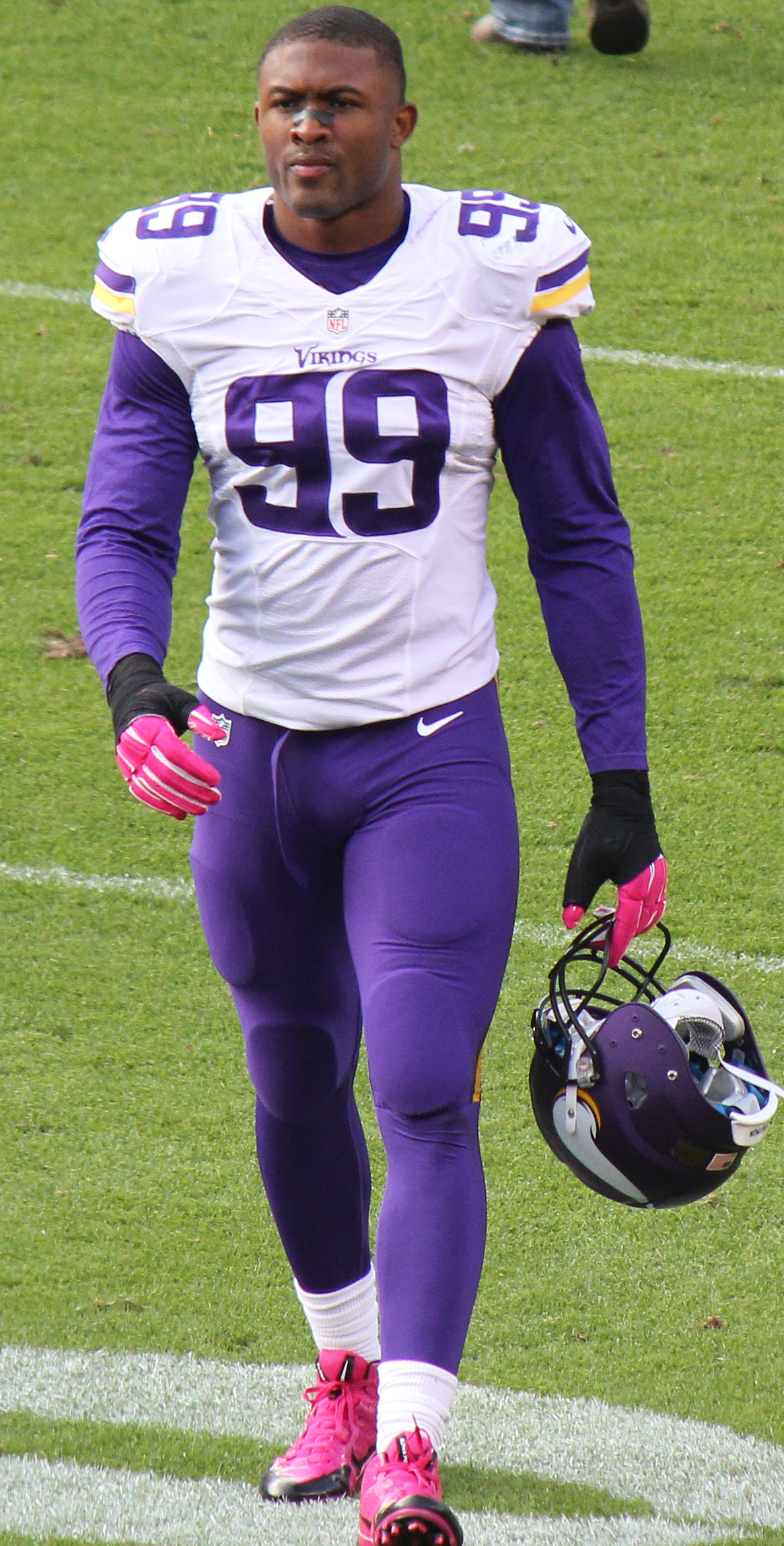
Danielle Hunter was drafted in the 3rd round by the Minnesota Vikings in 2015.

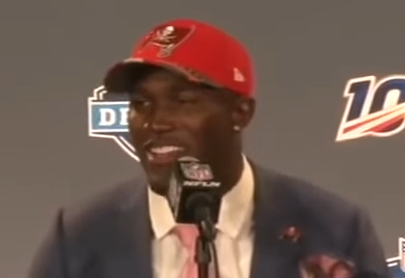
Devin White was drafted 5th overall by the Tampa Bay Buccaneers in 2019.

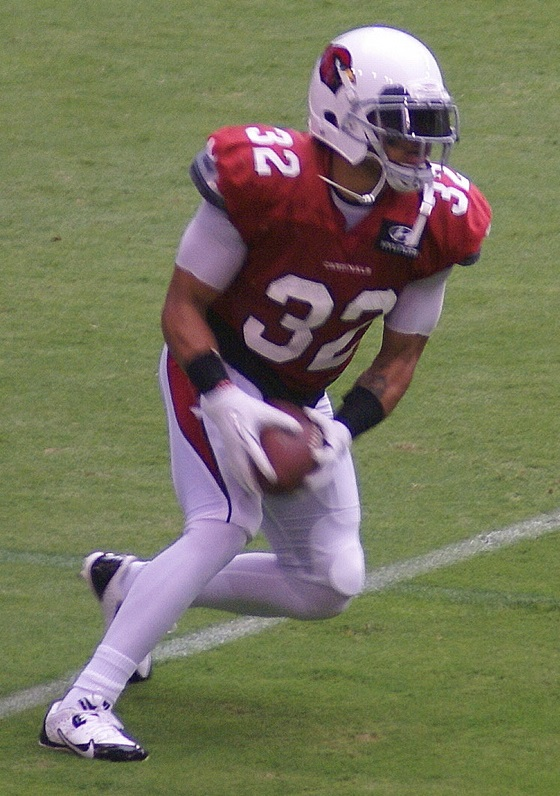
Tyrann Mathieu was drafted in the 3rd round by the Arizona Cardinals in 2013.

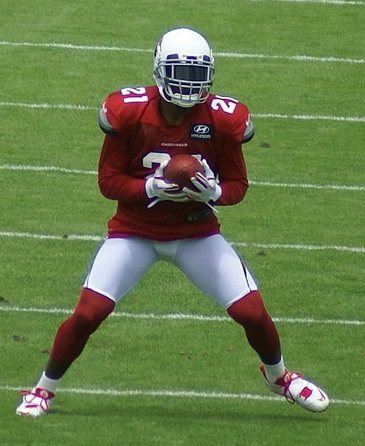
Patrick Peterson was drafted 5th overall by the Arizona Cardinals in 2011.

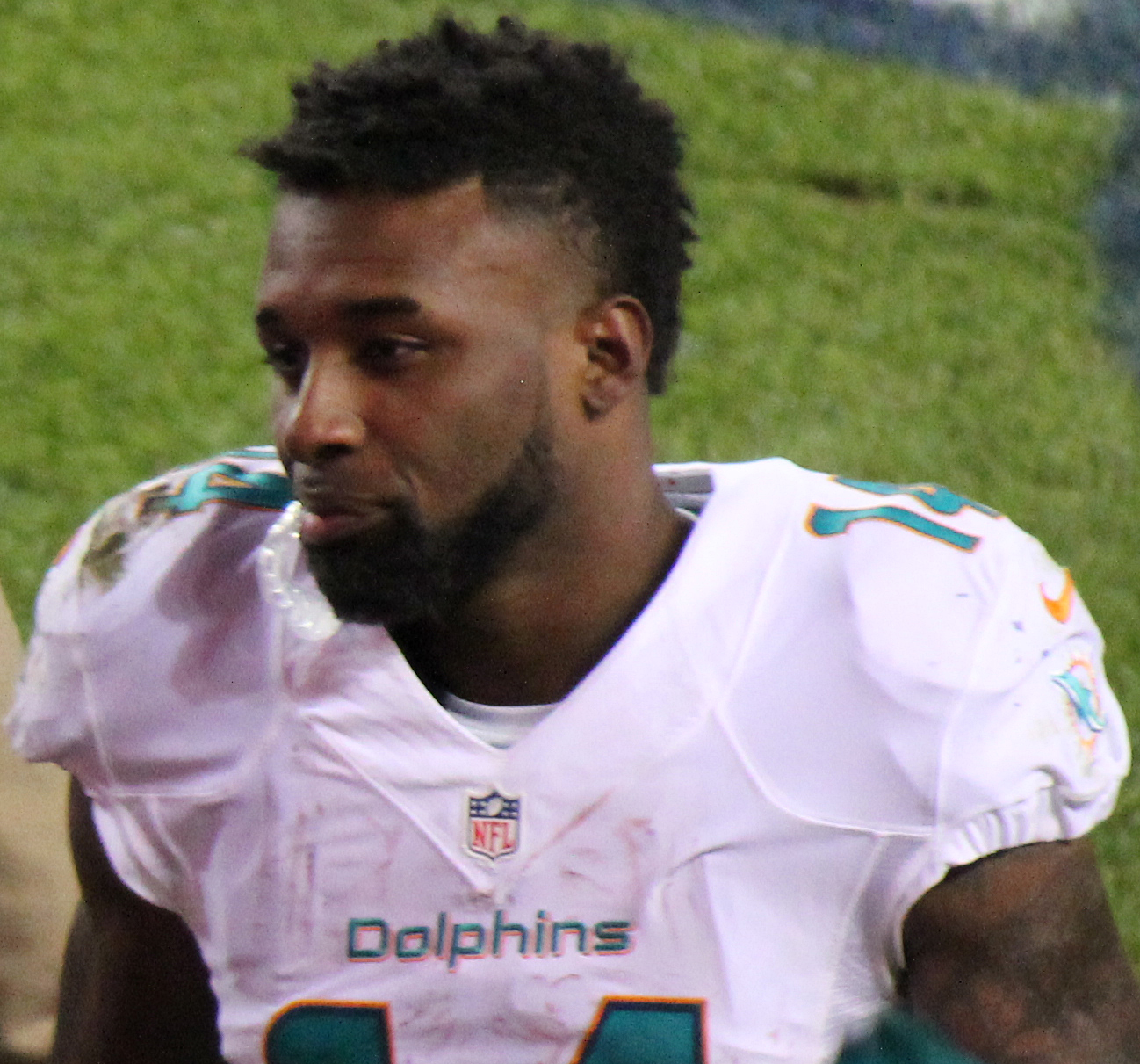
Jarvis Landry was drafted in the 2nd round by the Miami Dolphins in 2014.

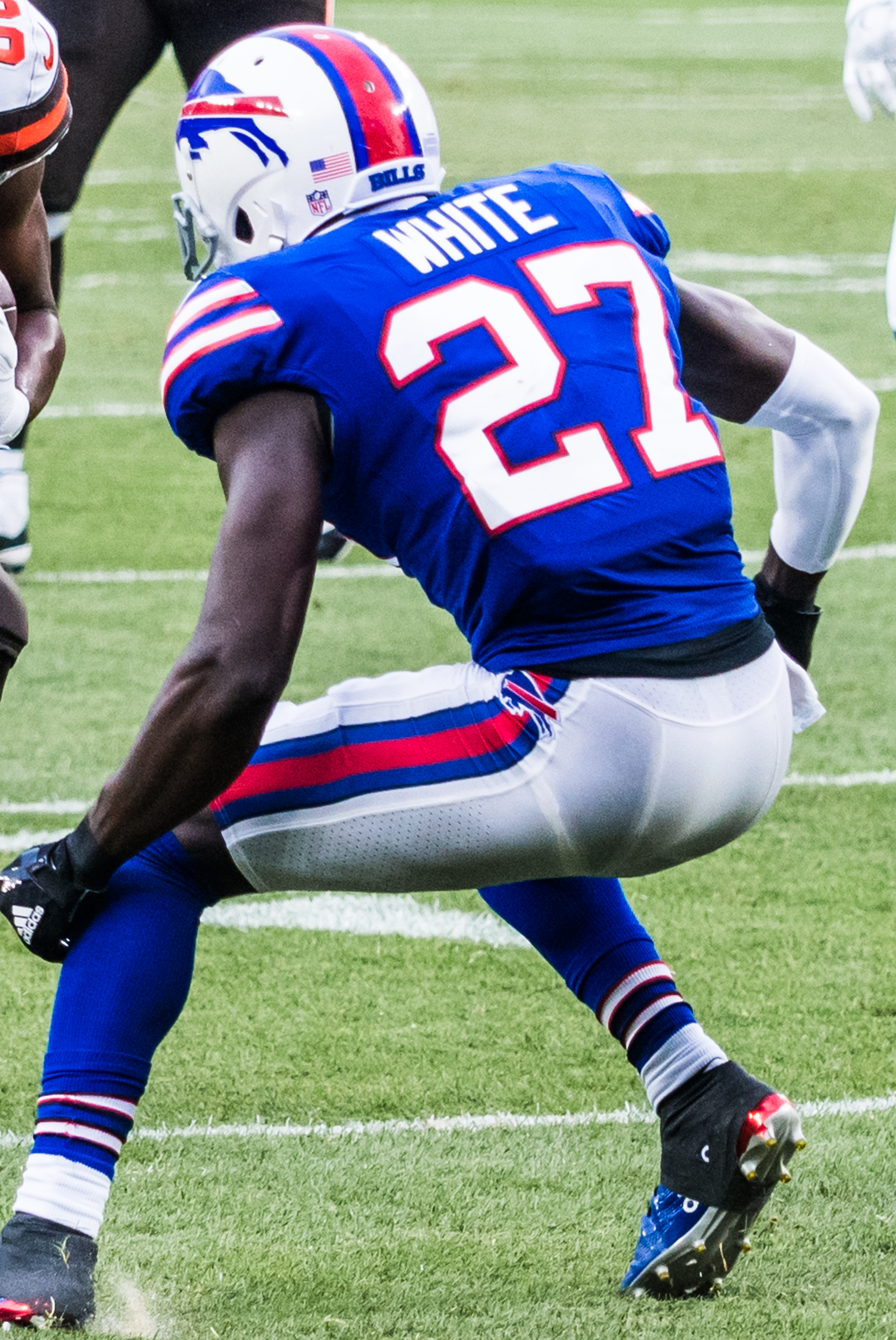
Tre'Davious White was drafted 27th overall by the Buffalo Bills in 2017.

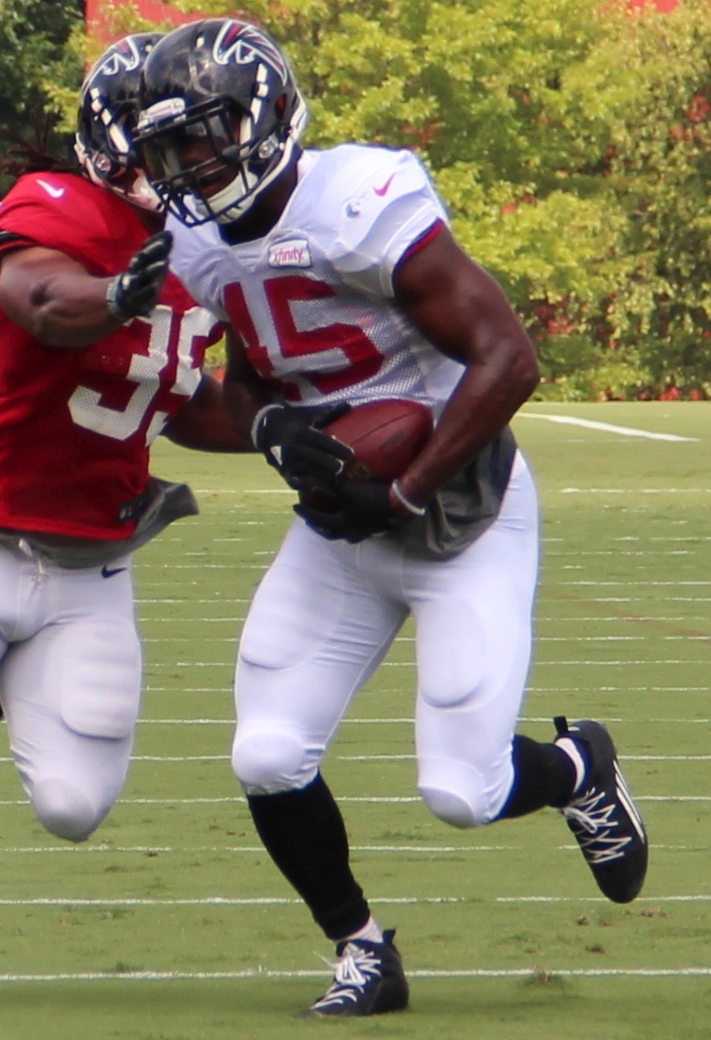
Deion Jones was drafted in the 2nd round by the Atlanta Falcons in 2016.

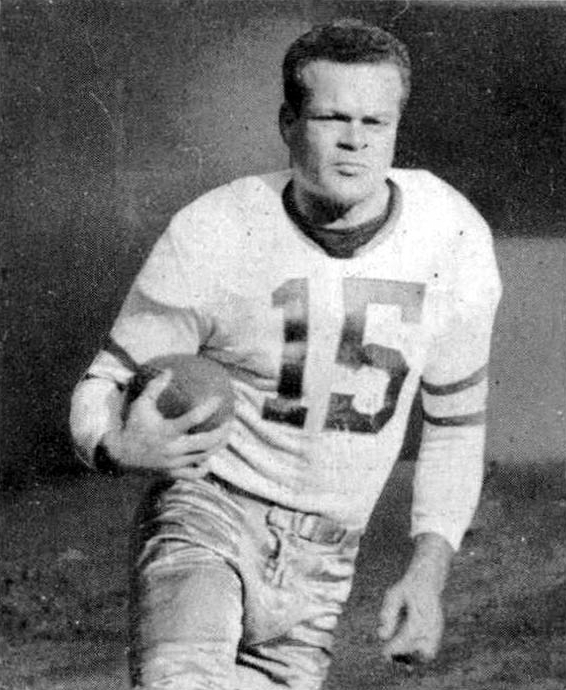
Steve Van Buren was drafted 5th overall by the Philadelphia Eagles in 1944.

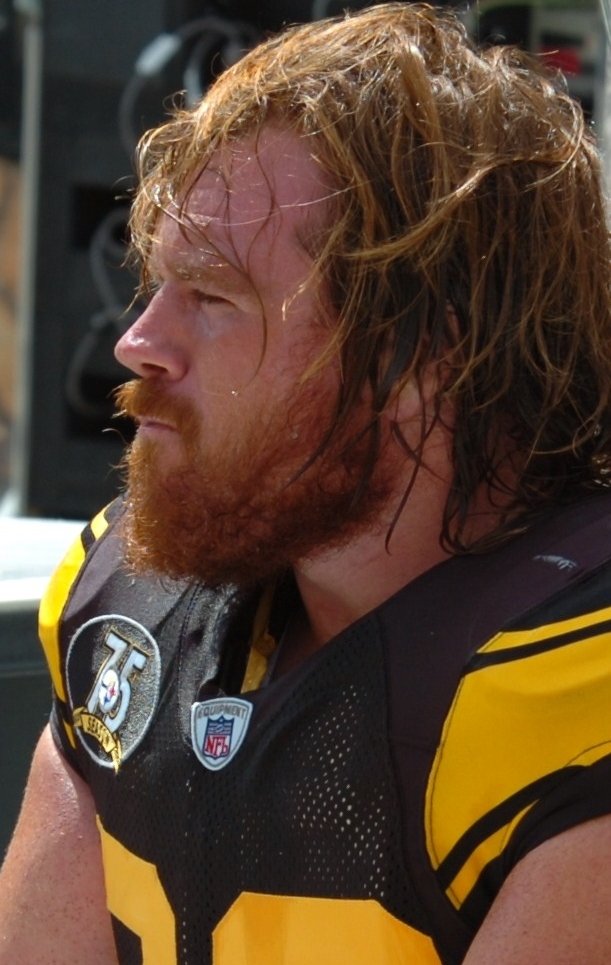
Alan Faneca was drafted 26th overall by the Pittsburgh Steelers in 1998.

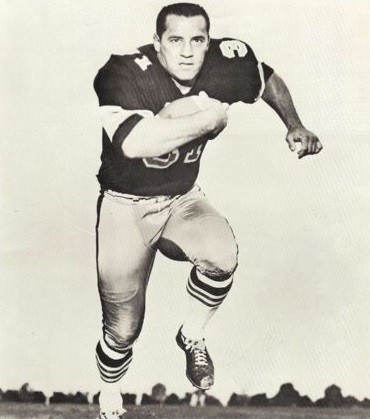
Jim Taylor was drafted in the 2nd round by the Green Bay Packers in 1958.

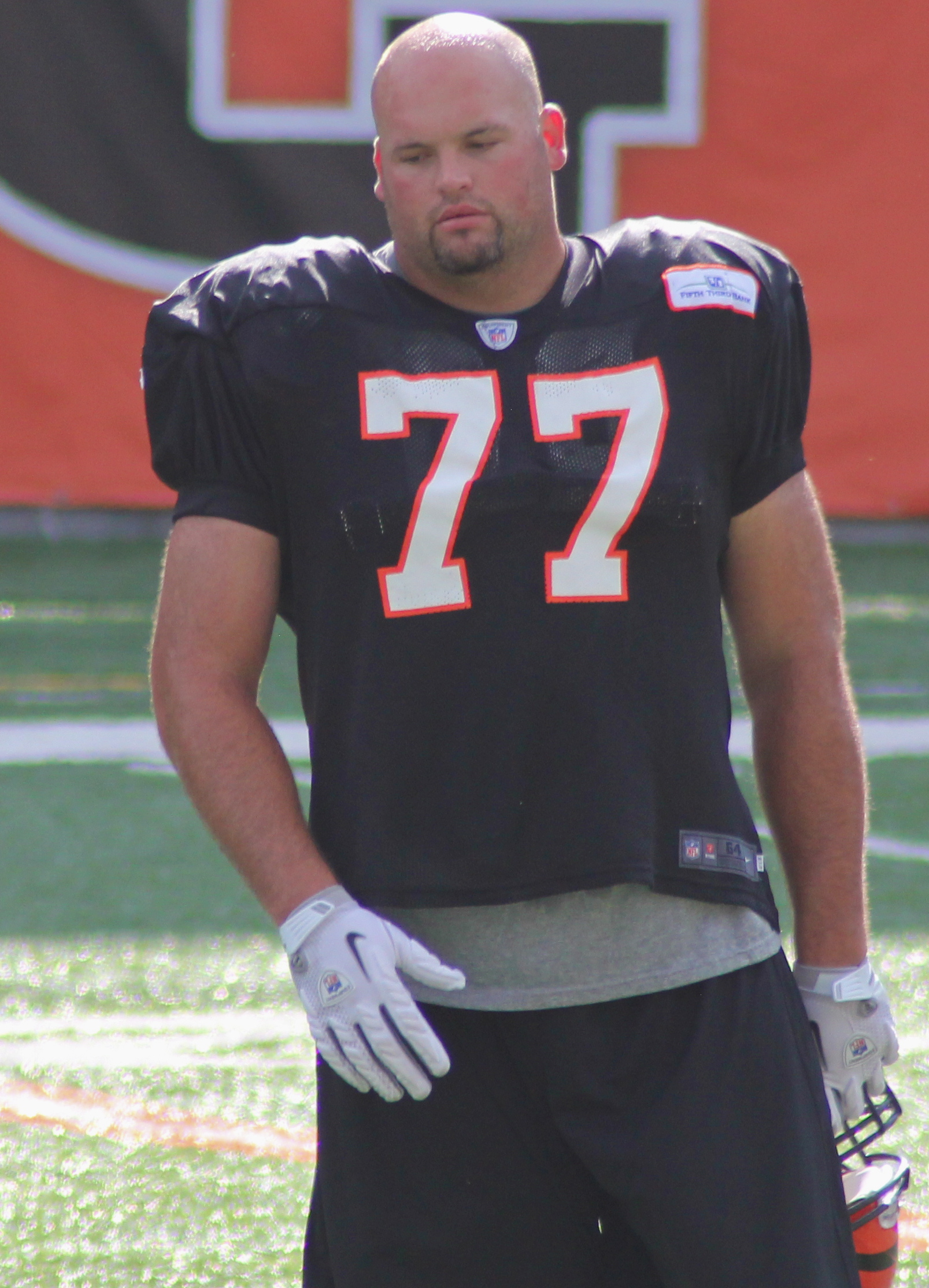
Andrew Whitworth was drafted in the 2nd round by the Cincinnati Bengals in 2006.

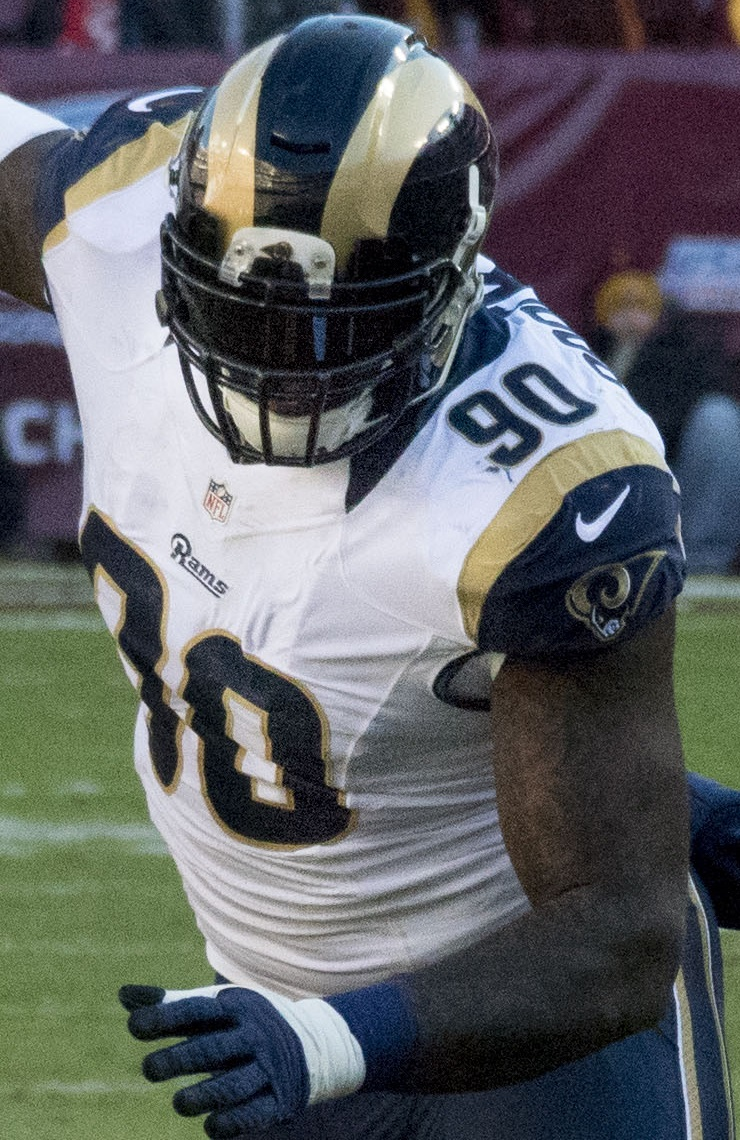
Michael Brockers was drafted 14th overall by the St. Louis Rams in 2012.

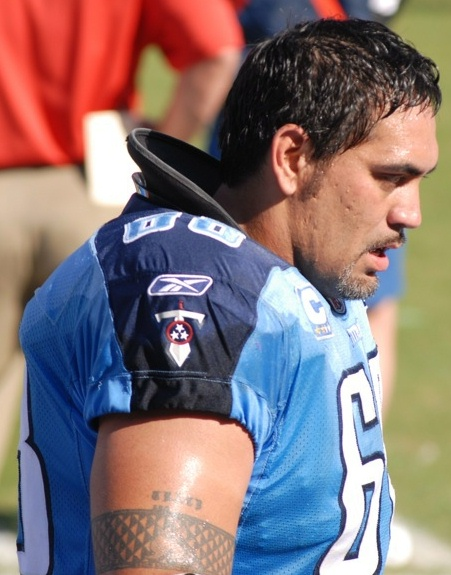
Kevin Mawae was drafted in the 2nd round by the Seattle Seahawks in 1994.

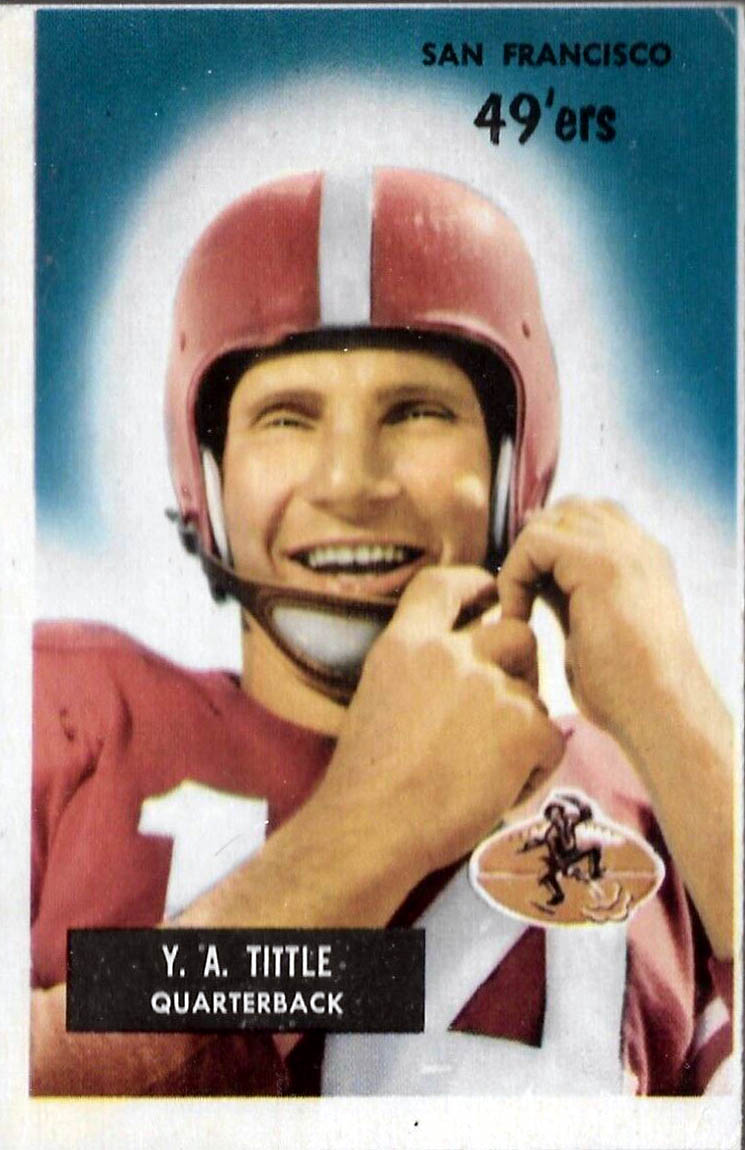
Y. A. Tittle was drafted 6th overall by the Detroit Lions in 1948 and 3rd overall by the San Francisco 49ers in 1951.

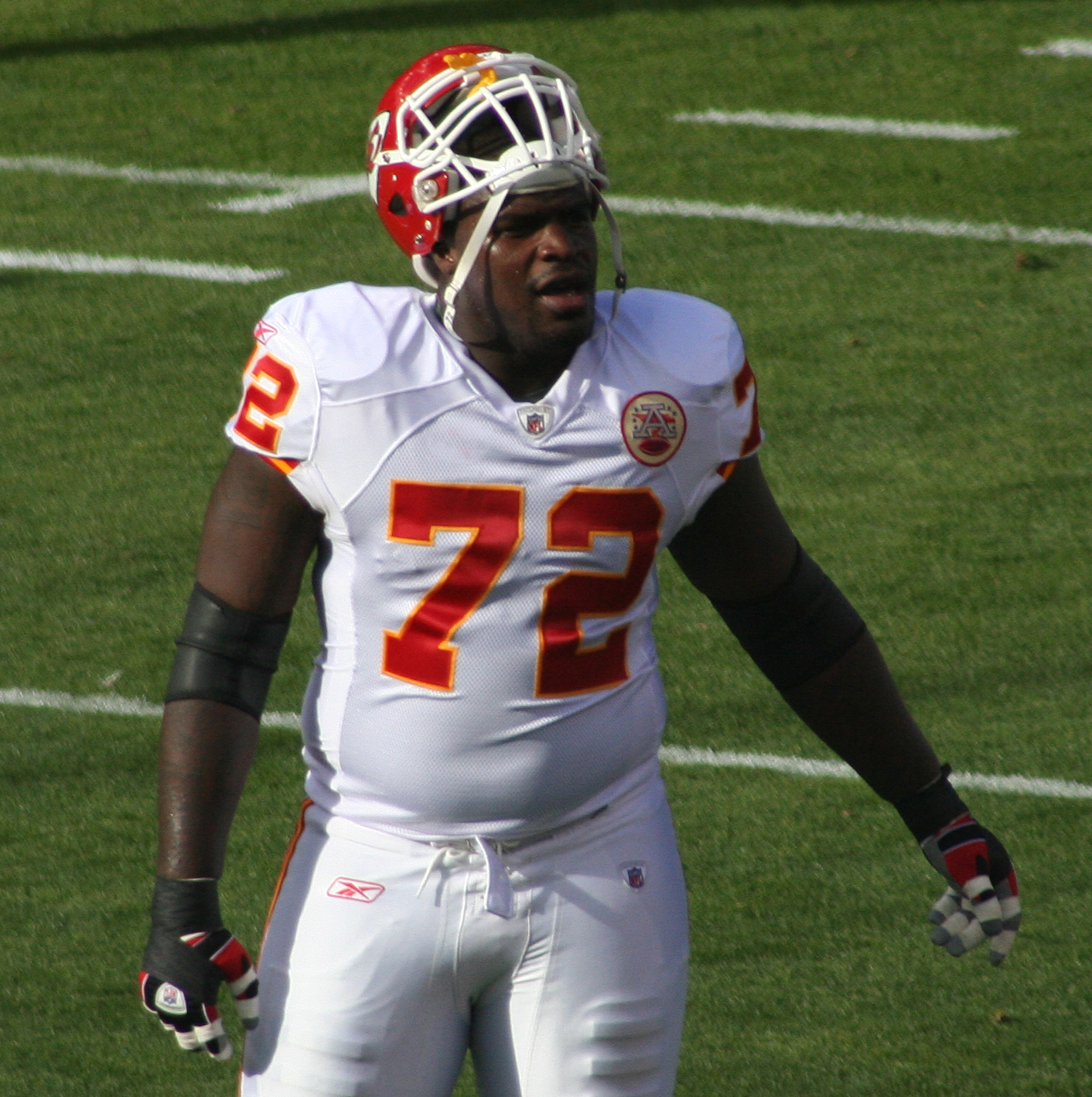
Glenn Dorsey was drafted 5th overall by the Kansas City Chiefs in 2008.

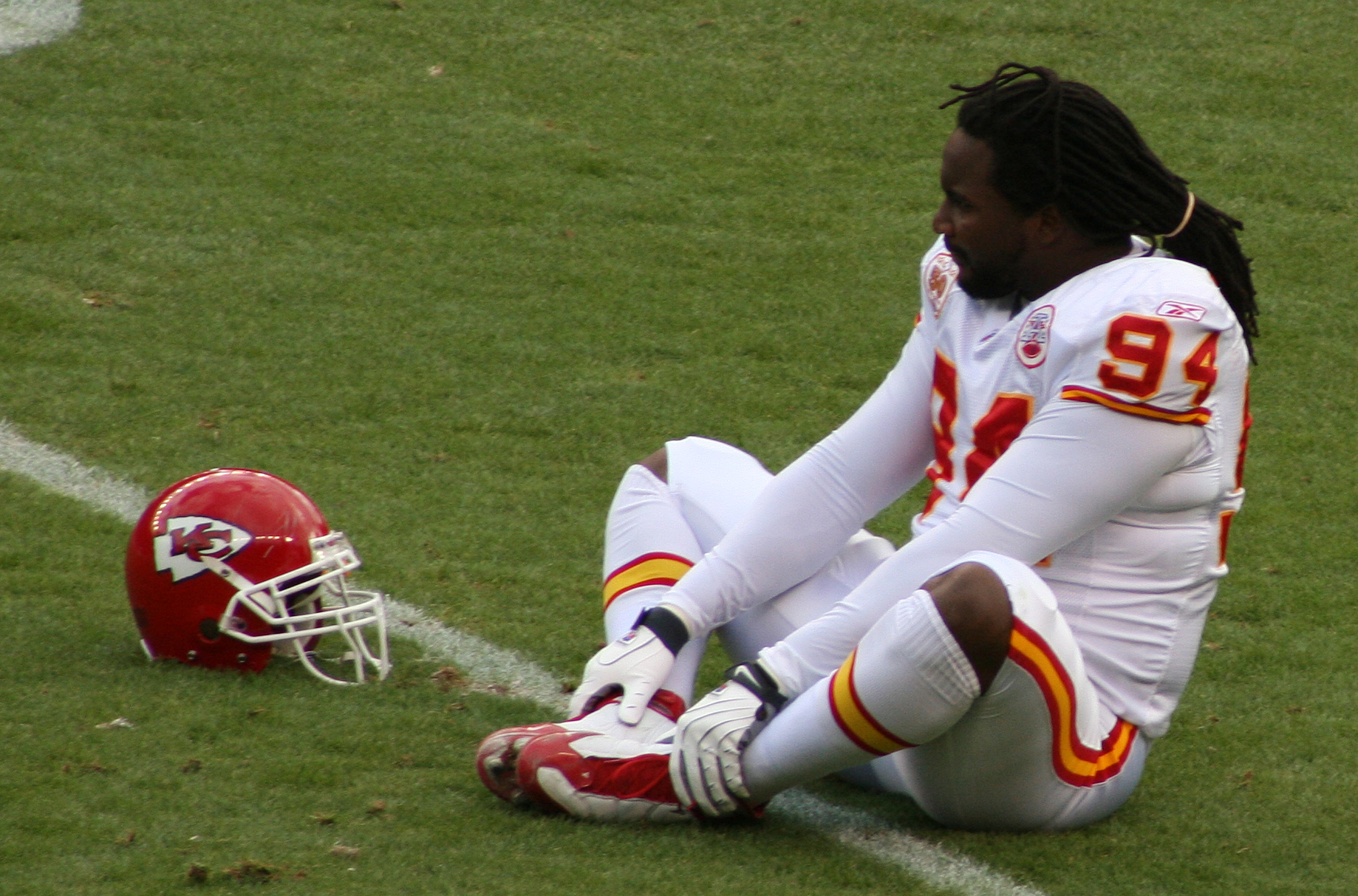
Tyson Jackson was drafted 3rd overall by the Kansas City Chiefs in 2009.

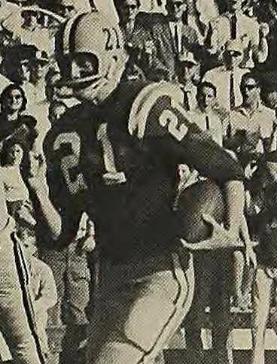
Jerry Stovall was drafted 2nd overall by the St. Louis Cardinals in 1963.

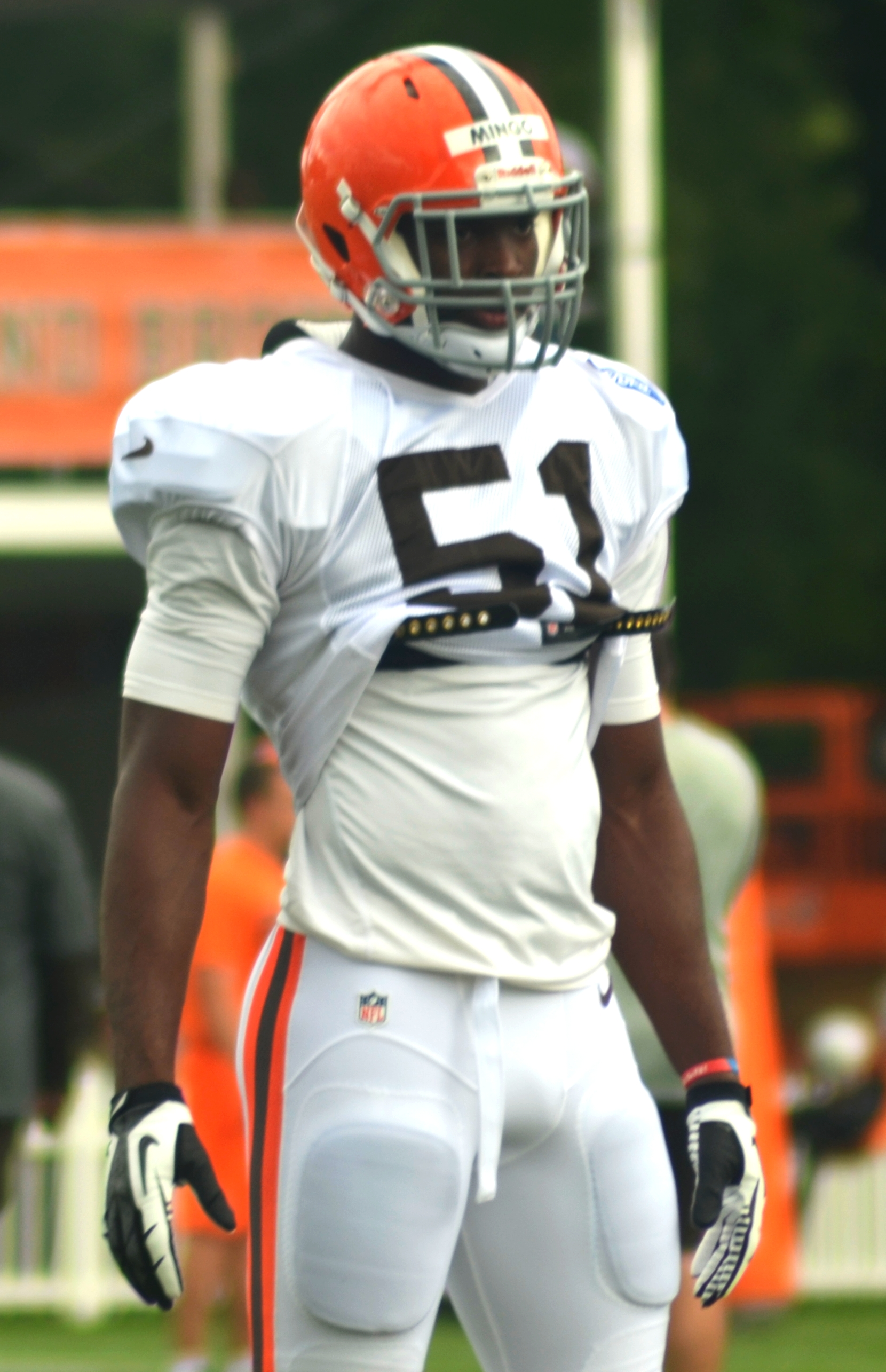
Barkevious Mingo was drafted 6th overall by the Cleveland Browns in 2013.

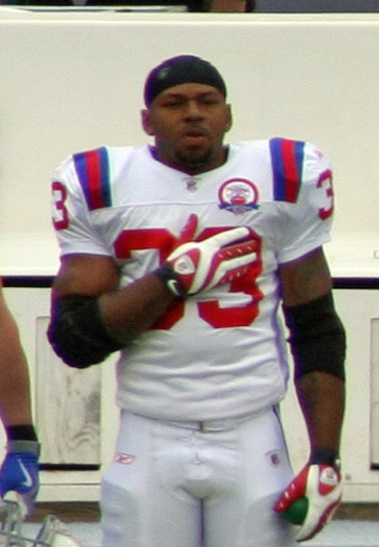
Kevin Faulk was drafted in the 2nd round by the New England Patriots in 1999.

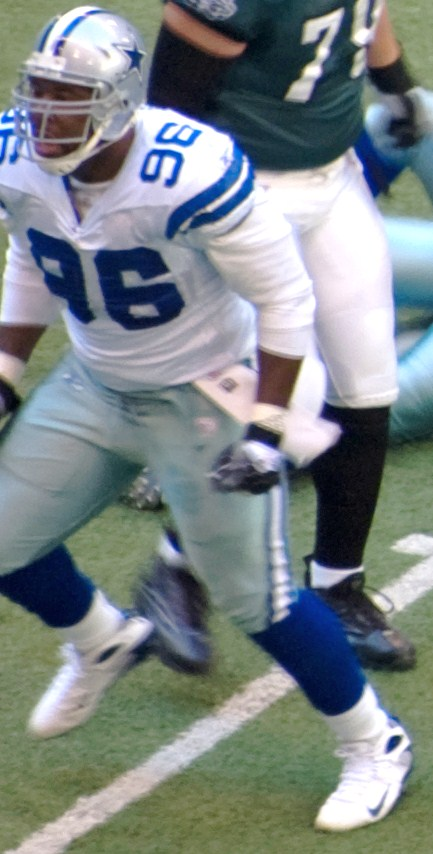
Marcus Spears was drafted 20th overall by the Dallas Cowboys in 2005.

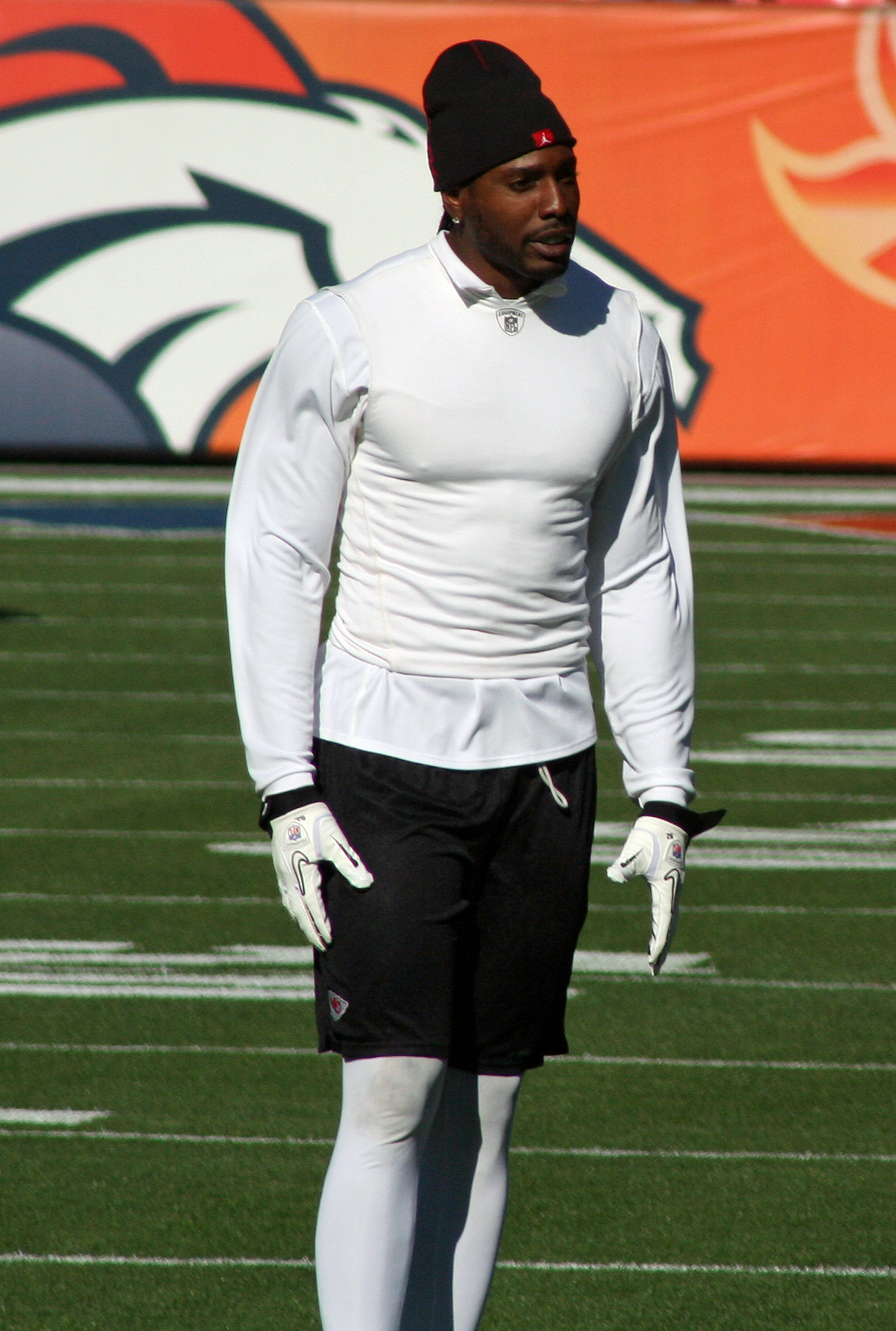
Dwayne Bowe was drafted 23rd overall by the Kansas City Chiefs in 2007.

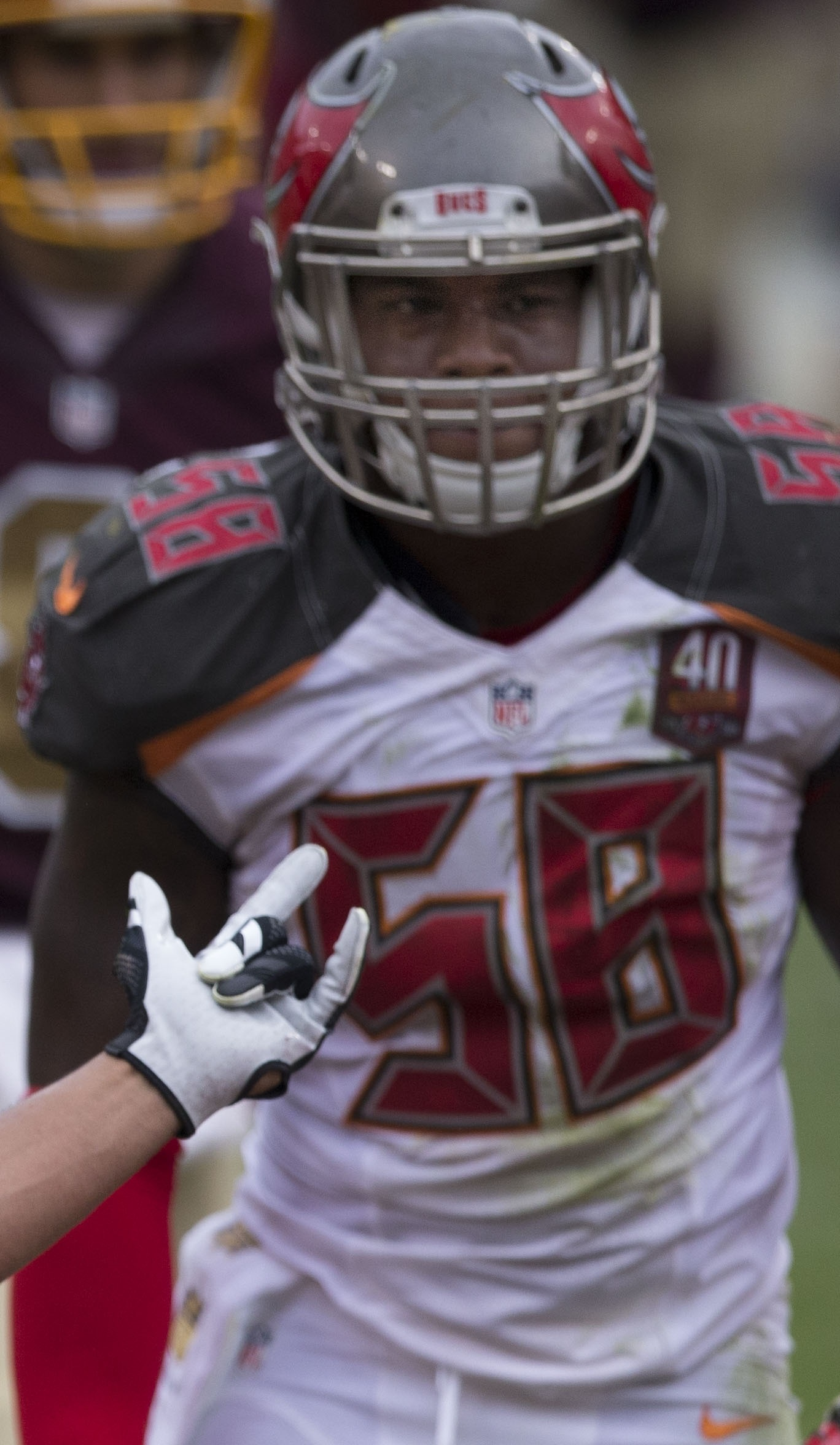
Kwon Alexander was drafted in the 4th round by the Tampa Bay Buccaneers in 2015.

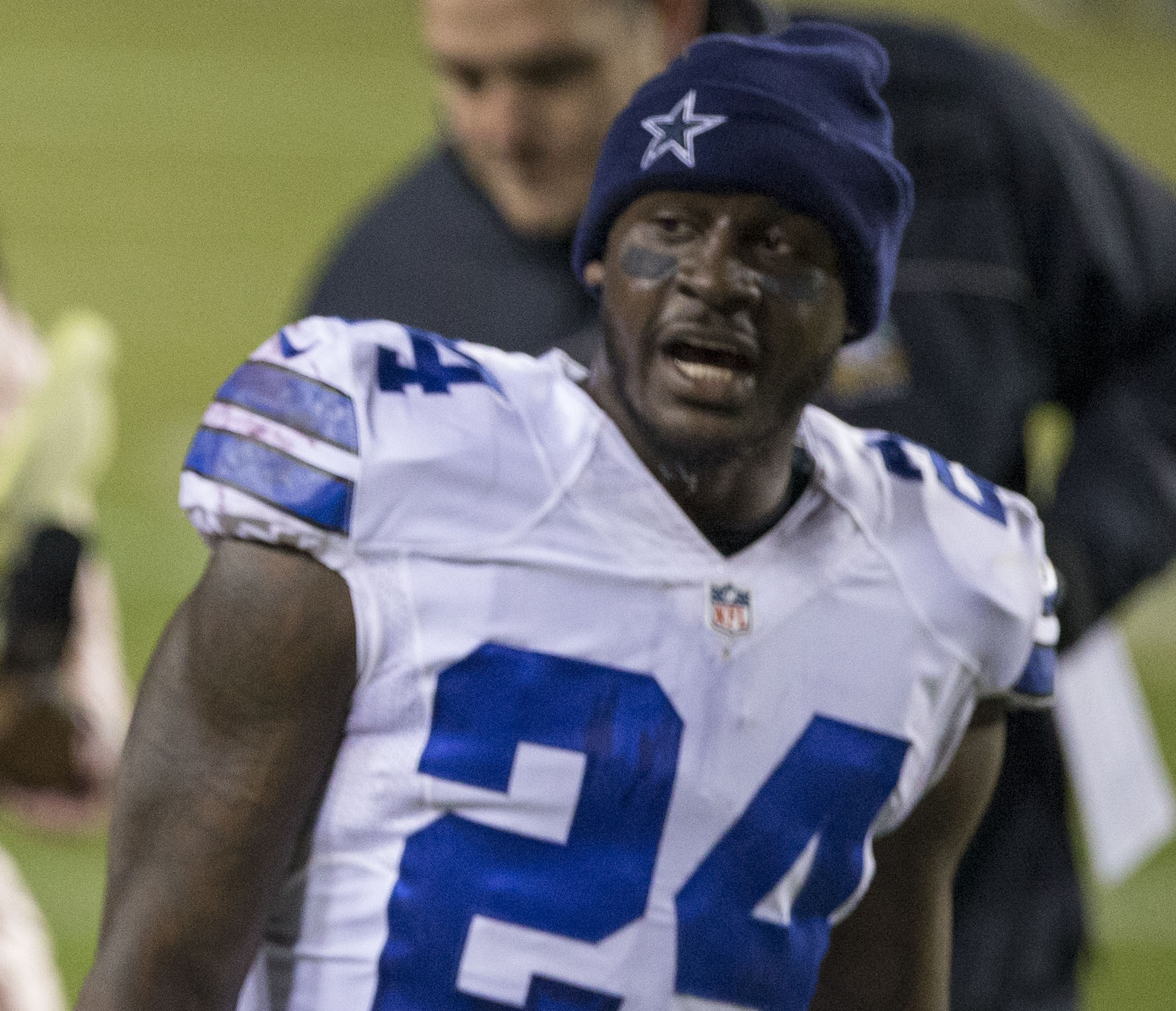
Morris Claiborne was drafted 6th overall by the Dallas Cowboys in 2012.

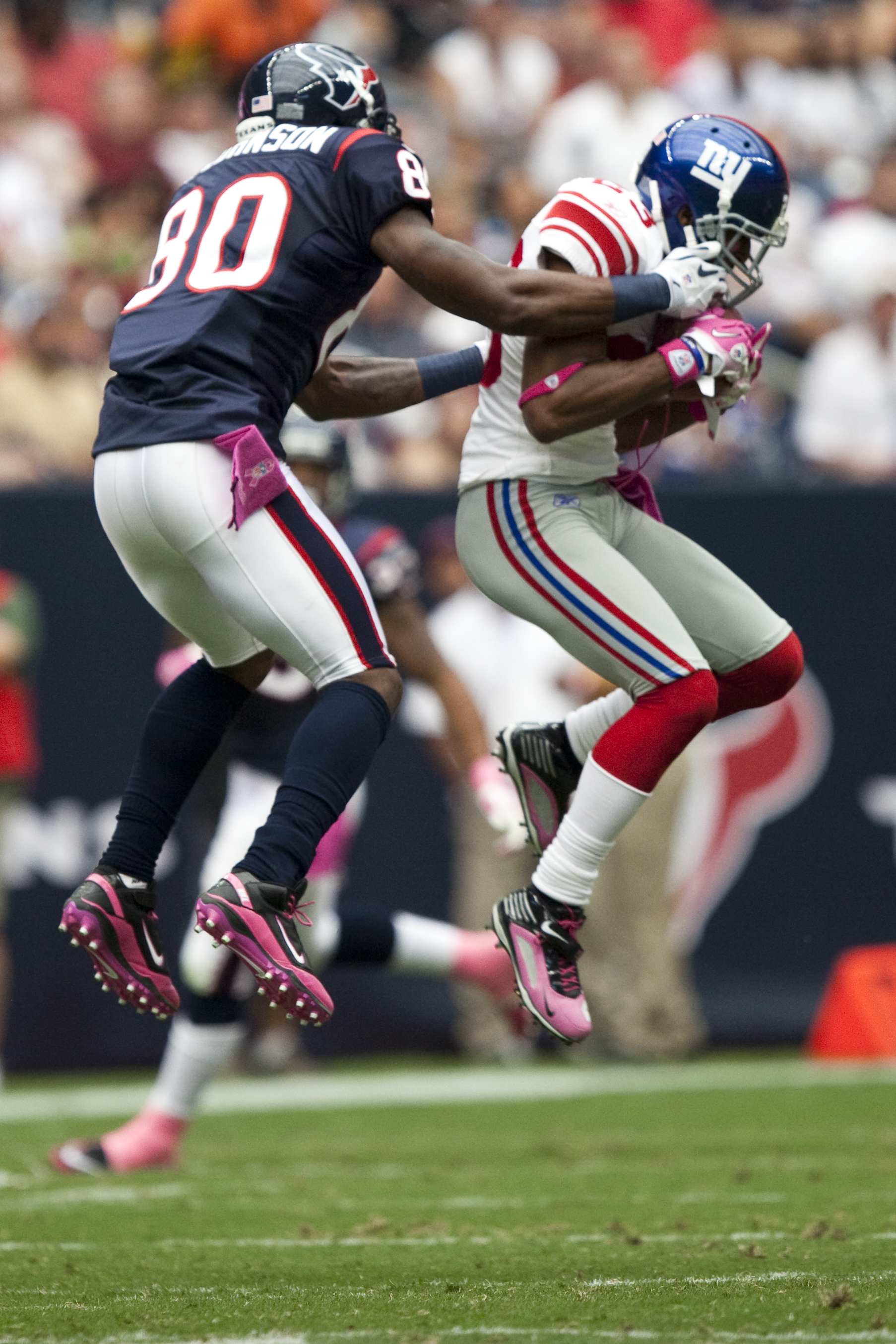
Corey Webster was drafted in the 2nd round by the New York Giants in 2005.

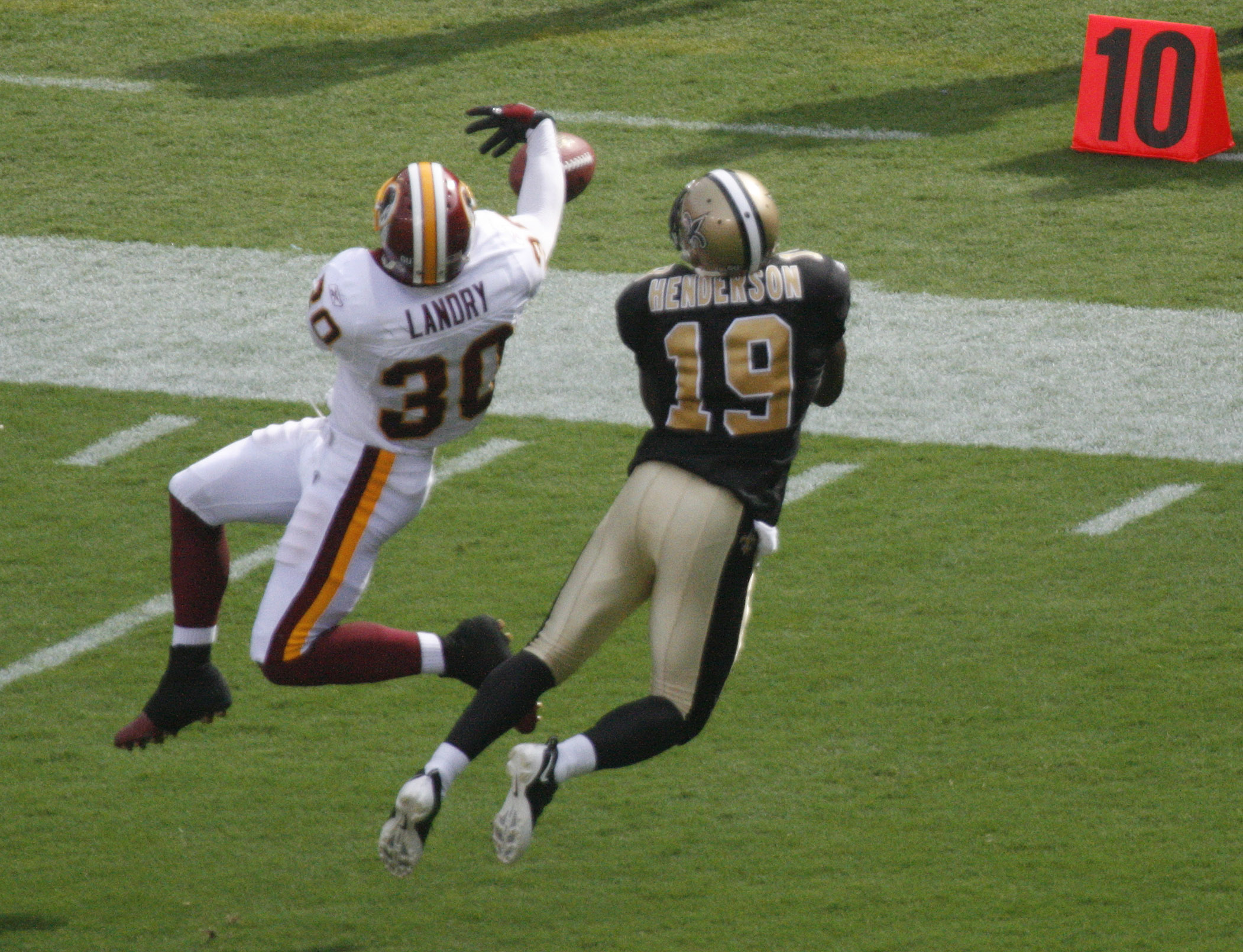
LaRon Landry was drafted 6th overall by the Washington Redskins in 2007.

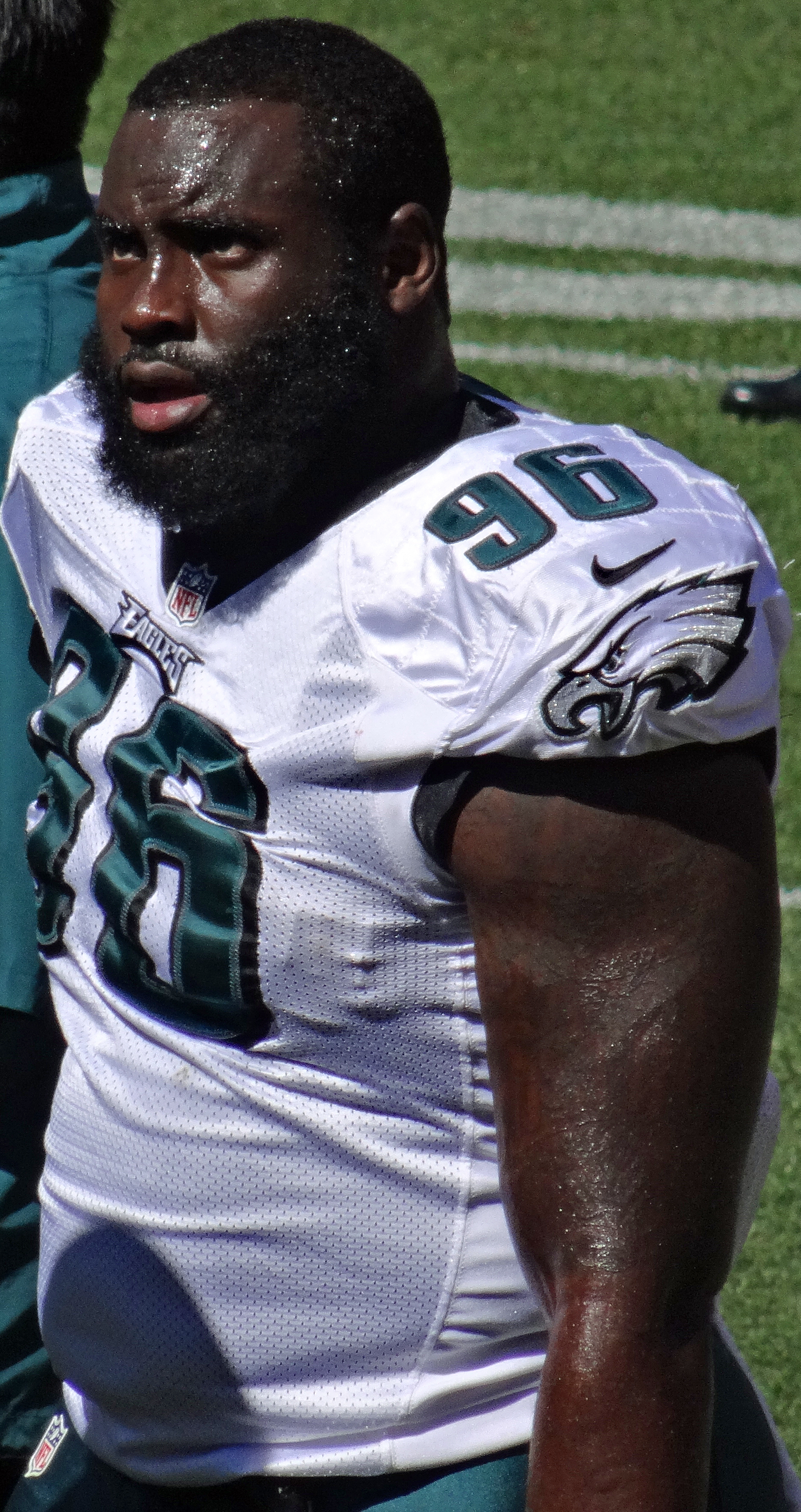
Bennie Logan was drafted in the 3rd round by the Philadelphia Eagles in 2013.

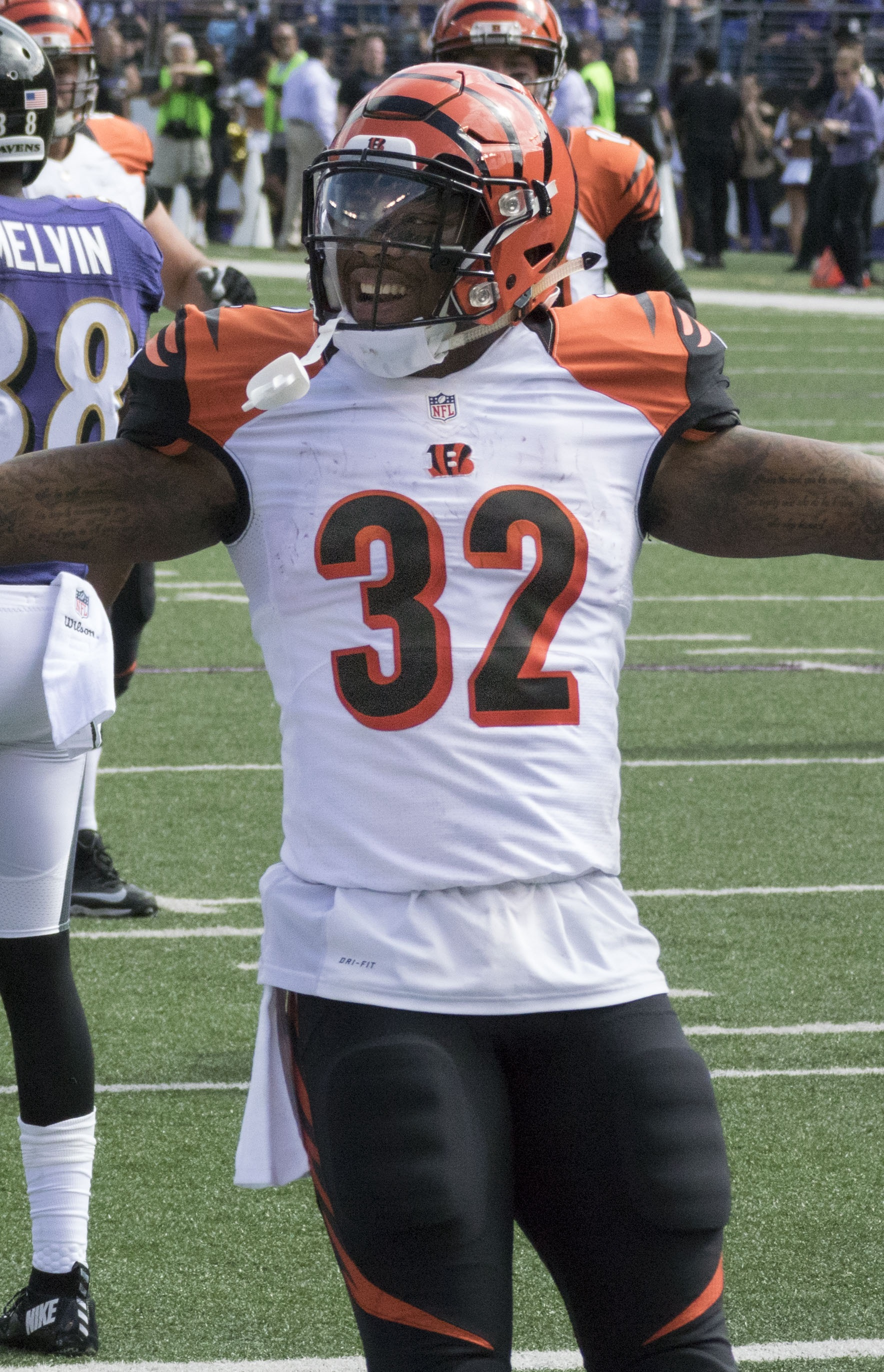
Jeremy Hill was drafted in the 2nd round by the Cincinnati Bengals in 2014.

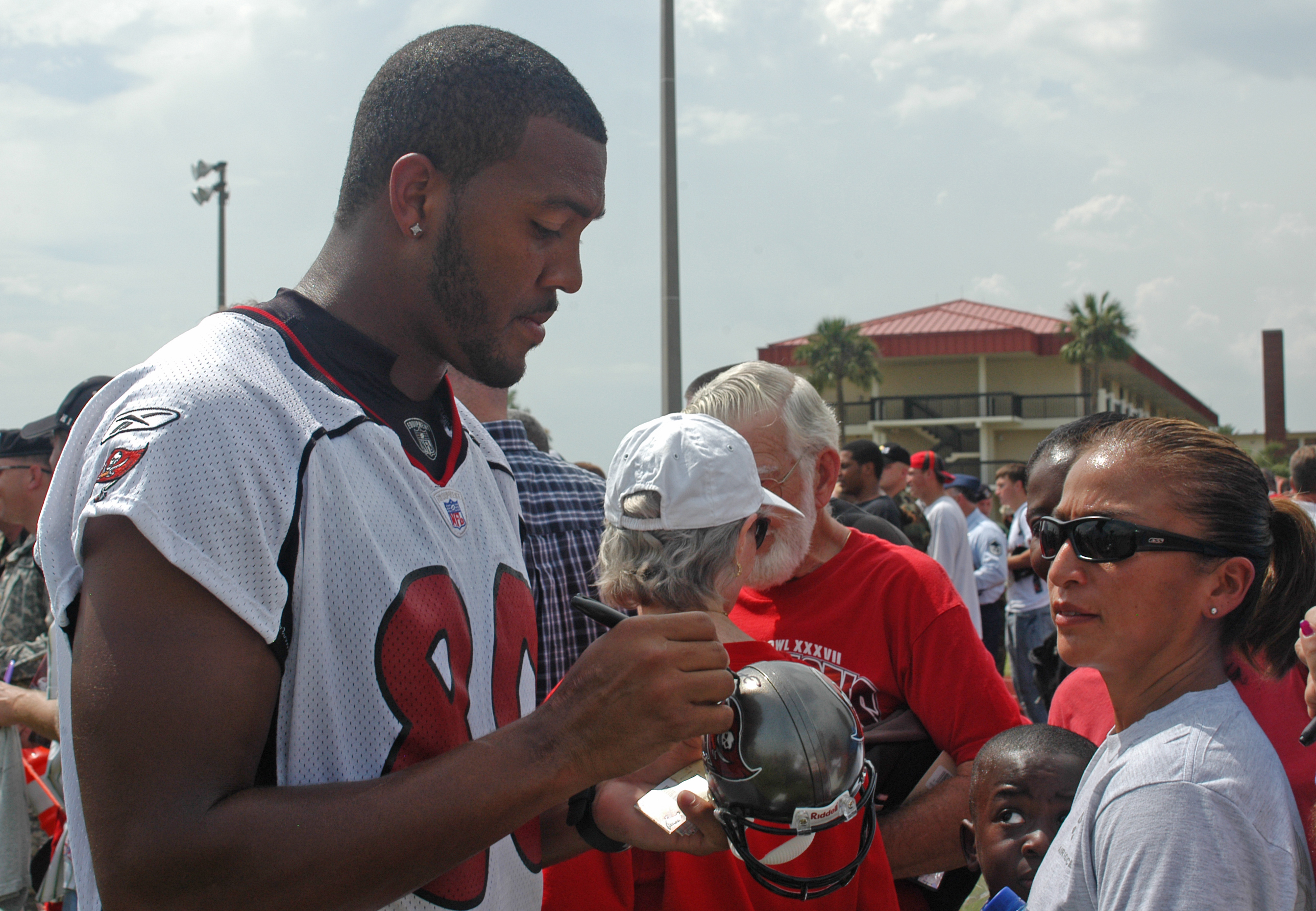
Michael Clayton was drafted 15th overall by the Tampa Bay Buccaneers in 2004.

=== National Football League ===
Year	Round	Pick	Player	Position	NFL team	Notes	Ref
1936	6	53	Abe Mickal	B	Detroit Lions	—	
1937	2	12	Gaynell Tinsley	E	Chicago Cardinals	NFL All-Star (1938); 2× First-team All-Pro (1937, 1938); NFL 1930s All-Decade Team	
1937	2	18	Marvin Stewart	C	Chicago Bears	—	
1938	No selections						
1939	5	33	Eddie Gatto	T	Cleveland Rams	—	
1939	15	133	Ben Friend	T	Cleveland Rams	—	
1939	20	184	Dick Gormley	C	Philadelphia Eagles	—	
1940	3	22	Ken Kavanaugh	E	Chicago Bears	3× First-team All-Pro (1946–1948); 3× NFL champion (1940, 1941, 1946); NFL 1940s All-Decade Team	
1940	20	187	Young Bussey	B	Chicago Bears	NFL champion (1941); NFL All-Star (1940)	
1941	14	122	J. W. Goree	G	Pittsburgh Steelers	—	
1941	20	184	Leo Barnes	T	Cleveland Rams	—	
1942	No selections						
1943	17	152	Walt Gorinski	B	Philadelphia Eagles	—	
1943	22	201	Percy Holland	G	Detroit Lions	—	
1943	29	273	Bill Edwards	G	Chicago Cardinals	—	
1943	30	285	Willie Miller	G	Cleveland Rams	—	
1944	1	5	Steve Van Buren^{*}	B	Philadelphia Eagles	2× NFL champion (1948, 1949); 5× First-team All-Pro (1944, 1945, 1947–1949); NFL 1940s All-Decade Team; NFL 75th Anniversary All-Time Team	
1944	14	139	Joe Hartley	T	Chicago Bears	—	
1944	14	140	Jim Talley	C	Philadelphia Eagles	—	
1944	18	186	Reldon Bennett	T	Boston Yanks	—	
1944	23	241	Dilton Richmond	E	Boston Yanks	—	
1944	31	323	Jim McLeod	E	Cleveland Rams	—	
1945	3	25	Alvin Dark	B	Philadelphia Eagles	Played in MLB	
1945	10	98	Hal Helscher	B	Green Bay Packers	—	
1945	11	101	Holley Heard	T	Chicago Cardinals	—	
1945	15	151	Bill Montgomery	B	Philadelphia Eagles	—	
1945	26	265	Felix Trapani	G	Brooklyn Tigers	—	
1945	26	266	Gene Knight	B	Chicago Cardinals	—	
1946	19	175	Tom Loflin	E	New York Giants	—	
1946	23	216	Andy Kosmac	C	Green Bay Packers	—	
1946	25	239	Charlie Webb	E	Washington Redskins	—	
1947	3	17	Gene Knight	B	Washington Redskins	—	
1947	17	152	Hubert Shurtz	T	Philadelphia Eagles	—	
1947	18	163	Ed Champagne	T	Los Angeles Rams	—	
1947	20	179	Charlie Webb	E	Washington Redskins	—	
1947	20	182	Fred Hall	G	Philadelphia Eagles	—	
1947	21	192	Shelton Ballard	C	Chicago Cardinals	—	
1947	30	282	Clyde Lindsey	E	Chicago Cardinals	—	
1948	1	6	Y. A. Tittle^{*}	QB	Detroit Lions	AP NFL MVP (1963); 4× First-team All-Pro (1957, 1961–1963); 7× Pro Bowl (1953, 1954, 1957, 1959, 1961–1963)	
1948	5	28	Dan Sandifer	B	Washington Redskins	—	
1948	7	55	Jim Cason	B	Chicago Cardinals	2× Pro Bowl (1951, 1954); First-team All-Pro (1949)	
1948	7	57	Ray Coates	B	New York Giants	—	
1948	11	87	Fred Land	T	Detroit Lions	—	
1948	12	99	Abner Wimberly	E	Boston Yanks	Pro Bowl (1952)	
1948	14	120	Bill Schroll	B	Los Angeles Rams	—	
1948	20	183	Ed Claunch	C	Philadelphia Eagles	—	
1949	6	53	Albin Collins	B	New York Bulldogs	—	
1950	3	37	Ray Collins	T	San Francisco 49ers	Pro Bowl (1951)	
1950	4	42	Zollie Toth	B	New York Bulldogs	Pro Bowl (1950)	
1950	8	98	Ebert Van Buren	B	New York Giants	—	
1950	10	120	Melvin Lyle	E	New York Bulldogs	—	
1950	14	180	Al Hover	G	Chicago Bears	—	
1951	1	3	Y. A. Tittle^{*}	QB	San Francisco 49ers	—	
1951	1	7	Ebert Van Buren	B	Philadelphia Eagles	—	
1951	1	14	Ken Konz	B	Cleveland Browns	2× First-team All-Pro (1956, 1957); Pro Bowl (1955); 2× NFL champion (1954, 1955)	
1951	2	16	Albin Collins	B	Green Bay Packers	—	
1951	10	117	Jim Shoaf	G	Detroit Lions	—	
1951	13	156	Joe Reid	C	Los Angeles Rams	—	
1951	22	265	Billy Baggett	B	Los Angeles Rams	—	
1952	2	18	George Tarasovic	C	Pittsburgh Steelers	—	
1952	12	141	Jim Roshto	B	Detroit Lions	—	
1952	13	151	Ray Potter	T	Washington Redskins	—	
1952	13	153	Rudy Yeager	T	San Francisco 49ers	—	
1952	20	238	Jess Yates	E	San Francisco 49ers	—	
1952	23	266	Chet Freeman	B	New York Yanks	—	
1953	6	64	Paul Miller	T	Los Angeles Rams	2× Pro Bowl (1955, 1956)	
1953	18	206	LeRoy Labat	B	Baltimore Colts	—	
1953	27	320	Ralph McLeod	E	San Francisco 49ers	—	
1954	23	266	Charles Oakley	B	Chicago Cardinals	—	
1954	24	281	William Harris	T	New York Giants	—	
1954	25	290	Jerry Marchand	B	Chicago Cardinals	—	
1955	2	20	Sid Fournet	T	Los Angeles Rams	—	
1955	21	248	Gary Dildy	C	New York Giants	—	
1955	22	260	Al Dogget	B	New York Giants	—	
1955	23	269	Elton Shaw	T	Green Bay Packers	—	
1956	12	134	Robert Nunnery	T	Detroit Lions	—	
1956	13	146	O. K. Ferguson	B	Detroit Lions	—	
1956	20	238	Vince Gonzales	B	Washington Redskins	—	
1957	1	13	Earl Leggett	T	Chicago Bears	—	
1957	11	128	Tommy Davis	B, K	San Francisco 49ers	2× Pro Bowl (1962, 1963)	
1957	16	193	Lou Deutschmann	B	New York Giants	—	
1957	21	252	Jerry Janes	E	Chicago Bears	Played in CFL	
1958	2	15	Jim Taylor^{*}	FB	Green Bay Packers	Super Bowl champion (I); 4× NFL champion (1961, 1962, 1965, 1966); 5× Pro Bowl (1960–1964); NFL MVP (1962); 3× First-team All-Pro (1960–1962); NFL 1960s All-Decade Team	
1959	13	148	Billy Shoemake	E	Washington Redskins	—	
1959	15	175	J. W. Brodnax	B	Pittsburgh Steelers	—	
1960	1	1	Billy Cannon	HB	Los Angeles Rams	—	
1960	1	3	Johnny Robinson^{*}	HB	Detroit Lions	Super Bowl champion (IV); First-team All-Pro (1970)	
1960	2	15	Warren Rabb	QB	Detroit Lions	—	
1960	8	94	Max Fugler	C	San Francisco 49ers	—	
1960	10	118	Mel Branch	E	San Francisco 49ers	—	
1961	2	28	Charles Strange	C	Philadelphia Eagles	—	
1961	15	210	Bobby Richards	T	Philadelphia Eagles	—	
1962	1	9	Wendell Harris	B	Baltimore Colts	—	
1962	1	14	Earl Gros	B	Green Bay Packers	NFL champion (1962)	
1962	4	45	Roy Winston	G	Minnesota Vikings	NFL champion (1969)	
1962	7	93	Fred Miller	T	Baltimore Colts	Super Bowl champion (V); 3× Pro Bowl (1967–1969); NFL champion (1968)	
1962	13	181	Billy Joe Booth	T	New York Giants	Played in CFL	
1962	16	224	Jimmy Field	B	Green Bay Packers	—	
1962	18	245	Tommy Neck	B	Chicago Bears	—	
1963	1	2	Jerry Stovall	B	St. Louis Cardinals	3× Pro Bowl (1966, 1967, 1969)	
1963	4	45	Don Estes	G	St. Louis Cardinals	—	
1963	8	106	Gene Sykes	B	Philadelphia Eagles	—	
1963	8	111	Dennis Gaubatz	LB	Detroit Lions	NFL champion (1968)	
1963	18	239	Buddy Soefker	LB	Boston Patriots	—	
1964	2	26	Billy Truax	TE	Cleveland Browns	Super Bowl champion (VI)	
1964	3	37	Remi Prudhomme	T	St. Louis Cardinals	Super Bowl champion (IV)	
1964	17	226	Mike Morgan	E	Philadelphia Eagles	—	
1964	18	244	Willis Langley	T	Detroit Lions	—	
1965	5	58	Dave McCormick	T	San Francisco 49ers	—	
1965	10	139	Pat Screen	B	Cleveland Browns	—	
1966	1	12	George Rice	T	Chicago Bears	—	
1966		Exp.	Bobby Richards	DE	Atlanta Falcons	—	
1967	3	77	Billy Masters	TE	Kansas City Chiefs	—	
1967	6	152	John Demarie	DE	Cleveland Browns	—	
1967	8	206	Tom Fussell	DT	Boston Patriots	—	
1967		Exp.	Earl Leggett	DT	New Orleans Saints	—	
1968	2	47	John Garlington	LB	Cleveland Browns	—	
1968	7	184	Sammy Grezaffi	DB	Kansas City Chiefs	—	
1968	13	349	James Dousay	RB	Houston Oilers	—	
1968		Exp.	White Graves	DB	Cincinnati Bengals	—	
1969	6	136	Ken Newfield	RB	Oakland Raiders	—	
1969	6	154	Bill Fortier	T	Baltimore Colts	—	
1969	8	206	Maurice LeBlanc	DB	Kansas City Chiefs	—	
1969	11	267	Tommy Morel	WR	New Orleans Saints	—	
1970	4	83	Eddie Ray	RB	Boston Patriots	—	
1970	11	286	Godfrey Zaunbrecher	C	Minnesota Vikings	—	
1970	17	421	George Bevan	DB	Buffalo Bills	—	
1971	7	167	Buddy Lee	QB	Chicago Bears	—	
1971	9	216	Mike Anderson	LB	Pittsburgh Steelers	—	
1971	17	420	John Sage	LB	Philadelphia Eagles	—	
1972	2	29	Tommy Casanova	DB	Cincinnati Bengals	First-team All-Pro (1976); 3× Pro Bowl (1973, 1975, 1976)	
1972	4	97	Andy Hamilton	WR	Kansas City Chiefs	—	
1972	8	186	Ron Estay	DT	Denver Broncos	—	
1972	15	367	Ken Kavanaugh Jr.	TE	New York Giants	—	
1973	1	2	Bert Jones	QB	Baltimore Colts	NFL MVP (1976); Pro Bowl (1976); First-team All-Pro (1976)	
1973	3	70	John Wood	DT	Denver Broncos	—	
1974	11	264	Norm Hodgins	DB	Chicago Bears	—	
1974	17	429	Collis Temple	Athlete	Detroit Lions	Played in NBA	
1975	1	22	Mike Williams	DB	San Diego Chargers	—	
1975	3	77	Bo Harris	LB	Cincinnati Bengals	—	
1975	7	163	Steve Rogers	RB	New Orleans Saints	—	
1975	9	211	Brad Davis	RB	Atlanta Falcons	—	
1975	10	250	Brad Boyd	TE	Detroit Lions	—	
1975	12	308	Ben Jones	WR	St. Louis Cardinals	—	
1976	5	150	Ken Bordelon	LB	Los Angeles Rams	—	
1976	7	189	Steve Cassidy	DT	Cleveland Browns	—	
1976	8	210	Larry Shipp	WR	Seattle Seahawks	—	
1976	17	479	Allen Misher	WR	Houston Oilers	—	
1977	1	13	A. J. Duhe	LB	Miami Dolphins	Pro Bowl (1984); NFL Defensive Rookie of the Year (1977)	
1977	8	200	Dan Alexander	G	New York Jets	—	
1977	8	223	Terry Robiskie	RB	Oakland Raiders	—	
1978	9	248	Blake Whitlatch	LB	San Diego Chargers	—	
1978	12	325	Lew Sibley	LB	Chicago Bears	—	
1979	1	12	Charles Alexander	RB	Cincinnati Bengals	—	
1979	6	151	Clinton Burrell	DB	Cleveland Browns	—	
1979	10	269	Al Green	DB	San Diego Chargers	—	
1980	2	30	Willie Teal	DB	Minnesota Vikings	—	
1980	5	114	Carlos Carson	WR	Kansas City Chiefs	2× Pro Bowl (1982, 1986)	
1980	5	126	John Adams	LB	Oakland Raiders	—	
1980	8	214	David Woodley	QB	Miami Dolphins	—	
1981	2	49	Chris Williams	DB	Buffalo Bills	—	
1981	2	54	Lyman White	LB	Atlanta Falcons	—	
1981	3	82	Greg LaFleur	TE	Philadelphia Eagles	—	
1981	4	99	Tracy Porter	WR	Detroit Lions	—	
1981	10	249	Hokie Gajan	RB	New Orleans Saints	—	
1982	2	50	Orlando McDaniel	DB	Buffalo Bills	—	
1982	11	289	Willie Turner	WR	Los Angeles Raiders	—	
1983	2	37	Leonard Marshall	DT	New York Giants	2× Super Bowl champion (XXI, XXV); 2× Pro Bowl (1985, 1986)	
1983	2	43	James Britt	DB	Atlanta Falcons	—	
1983	3	58	Tim Joiner	LB	Houston Oilers	—	
1983	3	71	Ramsey Dardar	G	St. Louis Cardinals	—	
1983	5	124	Malcolm Scott	TE	New York Giants	—	
1983	7	192	Bill Elko	G	San Diego Chargers	—	
1984	4	94	Rydell Melancon	LB	Atlanta Falcons	—	
1984	8	205	Eugene Daniel	DB	Indianapolis Colts	—	
1984	11	298	Gene Lang	RB	Denver Broncos	—	
1985	2	55	Jeffery Dale	DB	San Diego Chargers	—	
1985	3	72	Lance Smith	G	St. Louis Cardinals	—	
1985	3	74	Liffort Hobley	DB	Pittsburgh Steelers	—	
1985	7	179	Eric Martin	WR	New Orleans Saints	Pro Bowl (1988)	
1985	10	272	Greg Dubroc	LB	New York Giants	—	
1986	2	29	Garry James	RB	Detroit Lions	—	
1986	2	31	Dalton Hilliard	RB	New Orleans Saints	Pro Bowl (1989)	
1986	10	274	Jeff Wickersham	QB	Miami Dolphins	—	
1987	3	59	Karl Wilson	DE	San Diego Chargers	—	
1987	3	72	Henry Thomas	NT	Minnesota Vikings	2× Pro Bowl (1991, 1992)	
1987	3	86	Michael Brooks	LB	Denver Broncos	Pro Bowl (1992)	
1987	6	159	Toby Caston	LB	Houston Oilers	—	
1987	7	184	Roland Barbay	DT	Seattle Seahawks	—	
1987	12	335	Norman Jefferson	DB	Green Bay Packers	Mr. Irrelevant	
1988	1	27	Wendell Davis	WR	Chicago Bears	—	
1988	3	79	Kevin Guidry	CB	Denver Broncos	—	
1988	4	97	Sammy Martin	WR	New England Patriots	—	
1988	5	111	Eric Andolsek	G	Detroit Lions	—	
1988	9	245	Rogie Magee	WR	Chicago Bears	—	
1988	12	318	Chris Carrier	S	Phoenix Cardinals	—	
1988	12	320	Brian Kinchen	TE	Miami Dolphins	Super Bowl champion (XXXVIII)	
1989	1	10	Eric Hill	LB	Phoenix Cardinals	—	
1989	2	38	Ralph Norwood	OT	Atlanta Falcons	—	
1989	3	78	Greg Jackson	DB	New York Giants	Super Bowl champion (XXV)	
1989	4	106	Michael Mayes	DB	New Orleans Saints	—	
1989	7	171	Ron Sancho	LB	Kansas City Chiefs	—	
1989	9	251	Rudy Harmon	LB	San Francisco 49ers	—	
1990	2	43	Kenny Davidson	DE	Pittsburgh Steelers	—	
1990	3	59	Tommy Hodson	QB	New England Patriots	—	
1990	4	88	Tony Moss	WR	Chicago Bears	—	
1990	4	100	Eddie Fuller	RB	Buffalo Bills	—	
1990	6	164	Ronnie Haliburton	TE	Denver Broncos	—	
1990	8	209	Karl Dunbar	DT	Pittsburgh Steelers	—	
1990	9	246	Clint James	DT	New York Giants	—	
1990	9	Sup.	Willie Williams	TE	Phoenix Cardinals	—	
1991	1	21	Harvey Williams	RB	Kansas City Chiefs	—	
1991	7	168	Blake Miller	C	New England Patriots	—	
1991	11	285	Slip Watkins	WR	Detroit Lions	—	
1992	3	57	Marc Boutte	DT	Los Angeles Rams	—	
1992	3	60	Todd Kinchen	WR	Los Angeles Rams	—	
1993	No selections						
1994	2	36	Kevin Mawae^{*}	C	Seattle Seahawks	8× Pro Bowl (1999–2004, 2008, 2009); 7× First-team All-Pro (1999–2002, 2004, 2007, 2008); NFL 2000s All-Decade Team	
1994	3	69	Harold Bishop	TE	Tampa Bay Buccaneers	—	
1995	3	85	Rodney Young	S	New York Giants	—	
1995	6	172	Marcus Price	OT	Jacksonville Jaguars	—	
1996	1	18	Eddie Kennison	WR	St. Louis Rams	—	
1996	2	44	Tory James	CB	Denver Broncos	Super Bowl champion (XXXIII) Pro Bowl (2004)	
1996	2	53	Gabe Northern	DE	Buffalo Bills	—	
1997	1	22	David LaFleur	TE	Dallas Cowboys	—	
1997	3	75	Denard Walker	CB	Houston Oilers	—	
1997	6	165	Nicky Savoie	TE	New Orleans Saints	—	
1998	1	26	Alan Faneca ^{*}	G	Pittsburgh Steelers	Super Bowl champion (XL) 9× Pro Bowl (2001–2009); 6× First-team All-Pro (2001, 2002, 2004–2007); NFL 2000s All-Decade Team	
1998	2	49	Kenny Mixon	DE	Miami Dolphins	—	
1998	3	62	Chuck Wiley	DE	Carolina Panthers	—	
1999	1	15	Booger McFarland	NT	Tampa Bay Buccaneers	2× Super Bowl champion (XXXVII, XLI)	
1999	2	46	Kevin Faulk	RB	New England Patriots	3× Super Bowl champion (XXXVI, XXXVIII, XXXIX)	
1999	7	237	Todd McClure	C	Atlanta Falcons	—	
2000	2	34	Mark Roman	DB	Cincinnati Bengals	—	
2000	7	252	Rondell Mealey	RB	Green Bay Packers	—	
2001	6	164	Brandon Winey	OT	Miami Dolphins	—	
2001	6	172	Josh Booty	QB	Seattle Seahawks	Played in MLB	
2001	7	211	Louis Williams	OT	Carolina Panthers	—	
2002	2	36	Josh Reed	WR	Buffalo Bills	—	
2002	4	117	Rohan Davey	QB	New England Patriots	2× Super Bowl champion (XXXVIII, XXXIX)	
2002	4	126	Jarvis Green	DE	New England Patriots	2× Super Bowl champion (XXXVIII, XXXIX)	
2002	5	160	Robert Royal	TE	Washington Redskins	—	
2002	6	190	Howard Green	DT	Houston Texans	Super Bowl champion (XLV)	
2003	4	101	Domanick Davis	RB	Houston Texans	—	
2003	4	103	Bradie James	LB	Dallas Cowboys	—	
2003	4	132	LaBrandon Toefield	RB	Jacksonville Jaguars	—	
2003	7	244	Norman LeJeune	DB	Philadelphia Eagles	—	
2004	1	15	Michael Clayton	WR	Tampa Bay Buccaneers	Super Bowl champion (XLVI)	
2004	2	50	Devery Henderson	WR	New Orleans Saints	Super Bowl champion (XLIV)	
2004	2	63	Marquise Hill	DE	New England Patriots	Super Bowl champion (XXXIX)	
2004	3	83	Stephen Peterman	G	Dallas Cowboys	—	
2004	5	142	Chad Lavalais	DT	Atlanta Falcons	—	
2004	7	224	Donnie Jones	P	Seattle Seahawks	—	
2004	7	225	Matt Mauck	QB	Denver Broncos	—	
2005	1	20	Marcus Spears	DE	Dallas Cowboys	—	
2005	2	43	Corey Webster	CB	New York Giants	2× Super Bowl champion (XLII, XLVI)	
2005	4	104	Travis Daniels	CB	Miami Dolphins	—	
2006	1	30	Joseph Addai	RB	Indianapolis Colts	Super Bowl champion (XLI); Pro Bowl (2007)	
2006	2	55	Andrew Whitworth	OT	Cincinnati Bengals	Super Bowl champion (LVI) 4× Pro Bowl (2012, 2015, 2016, 2017); 2x First-team All-Pro (2015, 2017); Walter Payton NFL Man of the Year (2021)	
2006	3	68	Claude Wroten	DT	St. Louis Rams	—	
2006	4	125	Skyler Green	WR	Dallas Cowboys	—	
2006	5	134	Kyle Williams	DT	Buffalo Bills	6× Pro Bowl (2010, 2012–2014, 2016, 2018); First-team All-Pro (2010)	
2006	6	197	Melvin Oliver	DE	San Francisco 49ers	—	
2006	7	231	Bennie Brazell	WR	Cincinnati Bengals	—	
2007	1	1	JaMarcus Russell	QB	Oakland Raiders	—	
2007	1	6	LaRon Landry	FS	Washington Redskins	Pro Bowl (2012)	
2007	1	23	Dwayne Bowe	WR	Kansas City Chiefs	Pro Bowl (2010)	
2007	1	30	Craig Davis	WR	San Diego Chargers	—	
2007	7	213	Chase Pittman	DE	Cleveland Browns	—	
2008	1	5	Glenn Dorsey	DT	Kansas City Chiefs	—	
2008	3	68	Chevis Jackson	CB	Atlanta Falcons	—	
2008	3	69	Jacob Hester	RB	San Diego Chargers	—	
2008	3	81	Early Doucet	WR	Arizona Cardinals	—	
2008	4	120	Craig Steltz	S	Chicago Bears	—	
2008	7	209	Matt Flynn	QB	Green Bay Packers	Super Bowl champion (XLV)	
2008	7	232	Keith Zinger	TE	Carolina Panthers	—	
2009	1	3	Tyson Jackson	DE	Kansas City Chiefs	—	
2009	5	145	Quinn Johnson	FB	Green Bay Packers	Super Bowl champion (XLV)	
2009	5	167	Herman Johnson	G	Arizona Cardinals	—	
2009	7	219	Curtis Taylor	S	San Francisco 49ers	—	
2009	7	224	Demetrius Byrd	WR	San Diego Chargers	—	
2009	7	244	Ricky Jean-Francois	DT	San Francisco 49ers	—	
2010	3	76	Chad Jones	S	New York Giants	Super Bowl champion (XLVI)	
2010	3	78	Brandon LaFell	WR	Carolina Panthers	Super Bowl champion (XLIX)	
2010	4	103	Perry Riley	LB	Washington Redskins	—	
2010	4	123	Al Woods	DT	New Orleans Saints	—	
2010	6	197	Trindon Holliday	WR	Houston Texans	—	
2010	6	200	Charles Scott	RB	Philadelphia Eagles	—	
2011	1	5	Patrick Peterson	CB	Arizona Cardinals	8× Pro Bowl (2011–2018); 3× First-team All-Pro (2011, 2013, 2015)	
2011	3	68	Kelvin Sheppard	LB	Buffalo Bills	—	
2011	3	73	Stevan Ridley	RB	New England Patriots	Super Bowl champion (XLIX)	
2011	3	87	Drake Nevis	DT	Indianapolis Colts	—	
2011	3	92	Joe Barksdale	OT	Oakland Raiders	—	
2011	7	203	Lazarius Levingston	DT	Seattle Seahawks	—	
2012	1	6	Morris Claiborne	CB	Dallas Cowboys	Super Bowl champion (LIV)	
2012	1	14	Michael Brockers	DT	St. Louis Rams	—	
2012	2	63	Rueben Randle	WR	New York Giants	—	
2012	3	73	Brandon Taylor	S	San Diego Chargers	—	
2012	4	124	Ron Brooks	CB	Buffalo Bills	—	
2013	1	6	Barkevious Mingo	DE	Cleveland Browns	Super Bowl champion (LI)	
2013	1	18	Eric Reid	S	San Francisco 49ers	Pro Bowl (2013)	
2013	2	45	Kevin Minter	LB	Arizona Cardinals	Super Bowl champion (LV)	
2013	3	67	Bennie Logan	DT	Philadelphia Eagles	—	
2013	3	69	Tyrann Mathieu	DB	Arizona Cardinals	Super Bowl champion (LIV) 3x Pro Bowl (2015, 2020, 2021); 3x First-team All-Pro (2015, 2019, 2020)	
2013	3	95	Sam Montgomery	DE	Houston Texans	—	
2013	5	138	Tharold Simon	CB	Seattle Seahawks	Super Bowl champion (XLVIII)	
2013	5	142	Lavar Edwards	DE	Tennessee Titans	—	
2013	6	194	Spencer Ware	RB	Seattle Seahawks	2x Super Bowl champion (XLVIII, LIV)	
2014	1	12	Odell Beckham Jr.	WR	New York Giants	Super Bowl champion (LVI); 3× Pro Bowl (2014–2016); AP NFL Offensive Player of the Year (2014)	
2014	2	51	Ego Ferguson	DT	Chicago Bears	—	
2014	2	55	Jeremy Hill	RB	Cincinnati Bengals	—	
2014	2	63	Jarvis Landry	WR	Miami Dolphins	5× Pro Bowl (2015–2019)	
2014	3	92	Trai Turner	G	Carolina Panthers	5× Pro Bowl (2015–2019)	
2014	5	156	Lamin Barrow	LB	Denver Broncos	—	
2014	6	178	Zach Mettenberger	QB	Tennessee Titans	—	
2014	6	181	Alfred Blue	RB	Houston Texans	—	
2014	7	239	James Wright	WR	Cincinnati Bengals	—	
2015	2	42	Jalen Collins	CB	Atlanta Falcons	—	
2015	3	88	Danielle Hunter	DE	Minnesota Vikings	5x Pro Bowl (2018, 2019, 2022, 2023, 2024)	
2015	4	124	Kwon Alexander	LB	Tampa Bay Buccaneers	Pro Bowl (2017)	
2015	7	235	Kenny Hilliard	RB	Houston Texans	—	
2016	2	52	Deion Jones	LB	Atlanta Falcons	Pro Bowl (2017)	
2016	4	123	Jerald Hawkins	OT	Pittsburgh Steelers	—	
2016	4	133	Rashard Robinson	CB	San Francisco 49ers	—	
2016	7	233	Jalen Mills	CB	Philadelphia Eagles	Super Bowl champion (LII)	
2016	7	234	Vadal Alexander	G	Oakland Raiders	—	
2017	1	4	Leonard Fournette	RB	Jacksonville Jaguars	Super Bowl champion (LV)	
2017	1	6	Jamal Adams	S	New York Jets	3x Pro Bowl (2018, 2019, 2020); First-team All-Pro (2019)	
2017	1	27	Tre'Davious White	CB	Buffalo Bills	2x Pro Bowl (2019, 2020); First-team All-Pro (2019)	
2017	2	58	Ethan Pocic	C	Seattle Seahawks	—	
2017	3	75	Duke Riley	LB	Atlanta Falcons	—	
2017	3	107	Kendell Beckwith	LB	Tampa Bay Buccaneers	—	
2017	5	178	Davon Godchaux	DT	Miami Dolphins	—	
2017	7	247	Malachi Dupre	WR	Green Bay Packers	—	
2018	2	55	Donte Jackson	CB	Carolina Panthers	—	
2018	2	59	Derrius Guice	RB	Washington Redskins	—	
2018	2	61	D. J. Chark	WR	Jacksonville Jaguars	Pro Bowl (2019)	
2018	3	87	Arden Key	DE	Oakland Raiders	—	
2018	6	194	Russell Gage	WR	Atlanta Falcons	—	
2018	7	219	Danny Etling	QB	New England Patriots	—	
2018	7	245	Will Clapp	C	New Orleans Saints	—	
2019	1	5	Devin White	LB	Tampa Bay Buccaneers	Super Bowl champion (LV); Pro Bowl (2021)	
2019	2	46	Greedy Williams	CB	Cleveland Browns	—	
2019	4	137	Foster Moreau	TE	Oakland Raiders	—	
2020	1	1	Joe Burrow	QB	Cincinnati Bengals	NFL Comeback Player of the Year (2021)	
2020	1	20	K'Lavon Chaisson	LB	Jacksonville Jaguars	—	
2020	1	22	Justin Jefferson	WR	Minnesota Vikings	4x Pro Bowl (2020, 2021, 2022, 2024)	
2020	1	28	Patrick Queen	LB	Baltimore Ravens	Pro Bowl (2023)	
2020	1	32	Clyde Edwards-Helaire	RB	Kansas City Chiefs	Super Bowl champion (LVII)	
2020	2	44	Grant Delpit	DB	Cleveland Browns	—	
2020	2	61	Kristian Fulton	DB	Tennessee Titans	—	
2020	3	69	Damien Lewis	G	Seattle Seahawks	—	
2020	3	83	Lloyd Cushenberry	C	Denver Broncos	—	
2020	3	97	Jacob Phillips	LB	Cleveland Browns	—	
2020	4	108	Saahdiq Charles	T	Washington Redskins	—	
2020	4	131	Rashard Lawrence	DT	Arizona Cardinals	—	
2020	6	185	Blake Ferguson	LS	Miami Dolphins	—	
2020	7	251	Stephen Sullivan	TE	Seattle Seahawks	—	
2021	1	5	Ja'Marr Chase	WR	Cincinnati Bengals	3x Pro Bowl (2021, 2022, 2023); Associated Press NFL Rookie of the Year Award (2021)	
2021	2	59	Terrace Marshall Jr.	WR	Carolina Panthers	—	
2021	4	115	Jabril Cox	LB	Dallas Cowboys	—	
2021	4	122	Tyler Shelvin	DT	Cincinnati Bengals	—	
2021	6	205	Racey McMath	WR	Tennessee Titans	—	
2021	6	224	JaCoby Stevens	DB	Philadelphia Eagles	—	
2021	7	237	Kary Vincent Jr.	DB	Denver Broncos	—	
2022	1	3	Derek Stingley Jr.	CB	Houston Texans	2x Pro Bowl (2024, 2025)	
2022	2	59	Ed Ingram	G	Minnesota Vikings	—	
2022	3	82	Cordale Flott	DB	New York Giants	—	
2022	3	93	Tyrion Davis-Price	RB	San Francisco 49ers	Super Bowl champion (LIX)	
2022	4	124	Cade York	K	Cleveland Browns	—	
2022	4	126	Neil Farrell	DT	Las Vegas Raiders	Super Bowl champion (LVIII)	
2022	5	176	Damone Clark	LB	Dallas Cowboys	—	
2022	6	205	Austin Deculus	T	Houston Texans	—	
2022	6	210	Chasen Hines	G	New England Patriots	—	
2022	7	248	Andre Anthony	DE	Tampa Bay Buccaneers	—	
2023	2	41	BJ Ojulari	LB	Arizona Cardinals	—	
2023	4	108	Anthony Bradford	G	Seattle Seahawks	Super Bowl champion (LX)	
2023	4	134	Jay Ward	DB	Minnesota Vikings	—	
2023	5	141	Jaquelin Roy	DT	Minnesota Vikings	—	
2023	6	187	Kayshon Boutte	WR	New England Patriots	—	
2023	6	204	Jarrick Bernard-Converse	DB	New York Jets	—	
2024	1	2	Jayden Daniels	QB	Washington Commanders	Pro Bowl (2024); Associated Press NFL Rookie of the Year Award (2024)	
2024	1	6	Malik Nabers	WR	New York Giants	Pro Bowl (2024)	
2024	1	23	Brian Thomas Jr.	WR	Jacksonville Jaguars	Pro Bowl (2024)	
2024	2	48	Maason Smith	DT	Jacksonville Jaguars	—	
2024	4	116	Jordan Jefferson	DT	Jacksonville Jaguars	—	
2024	6	189	Mekhi Wingo	DT	Detroit Lions	—	
2025	1	4	Will Campbell	OT	New England Patriots	—	
2025	2	42	Mason Taylor	TE	New York Jets	—	
2025	3	91	Emery Jones	OT	Baltimore Ravens	—	
2025	3	101	Sai'vion Jones	DE	Denver Broncos	—	
2025	5	146	Bradyn Swinson	DE	New England Patriots	—	
2025	5	171	Miles Frazier	OG	Detroit Lions	—	
2025	7	243	Garrett Dellinger	OG	Baltimore Ravens	—	
2026	1	6	Mansoor Delane	CB	Kansas City Chiefs	—	
2026	3	78	A. J. Haulcy	S	Indianapolis Colts	—	
2026	3	89	Zavion Thomas	WR	Chicago Bears		—
2026	6	185	Bauer Sharp	TE	Tampa Bay Buccaneers	—	
2026	6	190	Barion Brown	WR	New Orleans Saints	—	
2026	6	215	Harold Perkins Jr.	LB	Atlanta Falcons	—	
2026	7	249	Garrett Nussmeier	QB	Kansas City Chiefs	—	

=== American Football League ===
Year	Round	Overall	Player name	Position	AFL team	Notes	Ref
1960	1	1	Billy Cannon	HB	Houston Oilers	3× AFL champion (1960, 1961, 1967) 2× AFL All-Star (1961, 1969); 2× First-team All-AFL (1961, 1967)	
1960	1		Johnny Robinson	HB	Dallas Texans	3× AFL champion (1962, 1966, 1969) 5× First-team All-AFL (1965–1969); 6× AFL All-Star (1963–1968); AFL All-Time Team	
1960	2		Mel Branch	T, G	Denver Broncos	AFL champion (1962) 3× AFL All-Star (1961–1963); 2× First-team All-AFL (1960, 1962)	
1960			Max Fugler	C	Boston Patriots	—	
1960			Warren Rabb	QB	Dallas Texans	—	
1961	3	17	Charles Strange	C	Denver Broncos	—	
1962	2	15	Earl Gros	B	Houston Oilers	—	
1962	6	42	Roy Winston	G	San Diego Chargers	—	
1962	7	51	Wendell Harris	DB	San Diego Chargers	—	
1962	20	158	Tommy Neck	DB	Boston Patriots	—	
1962	26	201	Fred Miller	DT	Oakland Raiders	—	
1962	26	206	Jimmy Field	QB	Boston Patriots	—	
1962	32	249	Bobby Richards	DE	Oakland Raiders	—	
1963	1	3	Jerry Stovall	HB	New York Jets	—	
1963	2	15	Don Estes	T	Houston Oilers	—	
1963	19	148	Gene Sykes	DB	Buffalo Bills	2× AFL champion (1964, 1965)	
1963	20	154	Buddy Soefker	LB	San Diego Chargers	—	
1963	25	199	Dennis Gaubatz	LB	Boston Patriots	—	
1964	2	14	Billy Truax	TE	Houston Oilers	—	
1964	14	108	Remi Prudhomme	C	Buffalo Bills	AFL champion (1969)	
1965	1	(RS)	Dave McCormick	T	Boston Patriots	—	
1965	4	(RS)	Mickey Cox	T	Boston Patriots	—	
1965	6	(RS)	Billy Ezell	DB	Boston Patriots	—	
1965	8	(RS)	Beau Colle	DB	Boston Patriots	—	
1965	12	(RS)	Pat Screen	QB	New York Jets	—	
1965	17	135	White Graves	DB	Boston Patriots	—	
1966	3	21	George Rice	T	Houston Oilers	—	
1966	11	98	Joe Labruzzo	HB	Oakland Raiders	—	
1966	19	164	Doug Moreau	E, K	Miami Dolphins	—	

== Notes ==
- Because of the NFL–AFL merger agreement, the history of the AFL is officially recognized by the NFL and therefore this list includes the AFL draft (1960–1966) and the Common Draft (1967–1969.
- Calculation of total number of LSU players drafted – If a player was selected in both the NFL and AFL drafts, he was only counted once. If a player was drafted by NFL, but did not enter the league and was redrafted he was counted multiple times. Expansion draft choices are not included in total.
- Calculation of total number of LSU First-Round draft picks – If a player was selected in the first-round of either the NFL or AFL draft, he was included in total number of LSU First-Round draft picks and was only counted once. If a player was drafted by NFL, but did not enter the league and was redrafted he was counted multiple times.
- (RS) – Denotes "Redshirt Draft" by the AFL in 1965 and 1966.
- Exp. – Denotes draft picks in NFL expansion draft.
- Sup. – Denotes draft picks in the NFL supplemental draft. The supplemental draft is held to accommodate players who did not enter the regular draft. The draft is scheduled to occur at some point after the regular draft and before the start of the next season.

== Notable undrafted players ==
Note: No drafts held before 1920

Debut Year	Player	Position	Debut Team	Notes
1975	Warren Capone	LB	Dallas Cowboys	—
1976	Rusty Jackson	P	Los Angeles Rams	—
1983	Jesse Myles	DB	Denver Broncos	—
1990	Victor Jones	RB	Houston Oilers	—
1992	Corey Raymond	CB	New York Giants	—
1994	Anthony Marshall	DB	Chicago Bears	—
1995	Brett Bech	WR	Jacksonville Jaguars	—
1995	Nate Miller	G	Atlanta Falcons	—
1996	Sheddrick Wilson	WR	Houston Oilers	—
1997	Ben Bordelon	G	San Diego Chargers	—
2000	Larry Foster	WR	Detroit Lions	—
2000	Alcender Jackson	G	Dallas Cowboys	—
2001	Fred Booker	DB	Philadelphia Eagles	—
2002	Ryan Clark	DB	New York Giants	Super Bowl champion (XLIII) Pro Bowl (2011)
2003	Kenderick Allen	DT	New Orleans Saints	—
2004	Eric Alexander	LB	New England Patriots	Super Bowl Champion (XXXIX)
2004	Eric Edwards	TE	Arizona Cardinals	—
2004	Trev Faulk	LB	St. Louis Rams	—
2004	Randall Gay	DB	New England Patriots	Super Bowl Champion (XXXIX)
2004	Adrian Mayes	DB	Arizona Cardinals	—
2005	Fred Booker	DB	New Orleans Saints	—
2005	Marcus Randall	DB	Tennessee Titans	—
2006	Jack Hunt	DB	Miami Dolphins	—
2006	Rudy Niswanger	C	Kansas City Chiefs	—
2006	Ronnie Prude	DB	Baltimore Ravens	—
2006	Ben Wilkerson	C	Cincinnati Bengals	—
2008	Ali Highsmith	LB	Arizona Cardinals	—
2008	Nate Livings	G	Cincinnati Bengals	—
2010	Darry Beckwith	LB	San Diego Chargers	—
2010	Harry Coleman	LB	New Orleans Saints	—
2010	Jacob Cutrera	LB	Jacksonville Jaguars	—
2010	Danny McCray	LB	Dallas Cowboys	—
2010	Keiland Williams	RB	Washington Redskins	—
2011	Chris Hawkins	DB	Tennessee Titans	—
2012	Richard Murphy	RB	Jacksonville Jaguars	—
2013	Michael Ford	RB	Chicago Bears	—
2013	Russell Shepard	WR	Tampa Bay Buccaneers	—
2014	Craig Loston	DB	Jacksonville Jaguars	—
2014	Anthony Johnson	DT	Miami Dolphins	—
2014	Brad Wing	P	Pittsburgh Steelers	—
2015	Delvin Breaux	CB	New Orleans Saints	—
2015	La'el Collins	T	Dallas Cowboys	—
2015	Terrence Magee	RB	Baltimore Ravens	—
2015	Ronald Martin	S	New York Jets	—
2016	Dillon Gordon	G	Philadelphia Eagles	—
2016	Reid Ferguson	LS	Buffalo Bills	—
2016	Lamar Louis	LB	Arizona Cardinals	—
2017	Tashawn Bower	LB	Minnesota Vikings	—
2017	Cyril Grayson	WR	Seattle Seahawks	Super Bowl champion (LV)
2017	Lewis Neal	DE	Dallas Cowboys	—
2018	Kevin Toliver	DB	Chicago Bears	—
2018	Darrel Williams	RB	Kansas City Chiefs	Super Bowl champion (LIV)
2019	John Battle	S	New York Giants	—
2019	Nick Brossette	RB	New England Patriots	—
2019	Garrett Brumfield	OL	Pittsburgh Steelers	—
2020	Derrick Dillon	WR	New York Giants	—
2020	Michael Divinity	LB	Tampa Bay Buccaneers	—
2020	Breiden Fehoko	DT	Los Angeles Chargers	—
2020	Adrian Magee	T	New Orleans Saints	—
2020	Thaddeus Moss	TE	Washington Football Team	—
2020	Badara Traore	T	Chicago Bears	—
2021	Tory Carter	FB	Tennessee Titans	—
2021	Zach Von Rosenberg	P	Minnesota Vikings	—
2022	Darren Evans	CB	New York Giants	—
2022	Jontre Kirklin	WR	Arizona Cardinals	—
2022	Glen Logan	DT	Cleveland Browns	—
2022	Liam Shanahan	C	New England Patriots	—
2023	Micah Baskerville	LB	Chicago Bears	—
2023	Ali Gaye	DE	Houston Texas	—
2023	Jaray Jenkins	WR	Jacksonville Jaguars	—
2023	Mike Jones Jr.	LB	Atlanta Falcons	—
2024	Noah Cain	RB	Cincinnati Bengals	—
2024	Ovie Oghoufo	DE	New York Giants	—
2024	Andre' Sam	S	Philadelphia Eagles	—
2024	Omar Speights	LB	Los Angeles Rams	—
2024	Charles Turner III	C	New England Patriots	—
2025	Zy Alexander	CB	Seattle Seahawks	—
2025	Major Burns	S	Chicago Bears	—
2025	Gio Paez	DL	Chicago Bears	—
2025	Paris Shand	DE	Buffalo Bills	—
2025	Josh Williams	RB	Tampa Bay Buccaneers	—
2026	Aaron Anderson	WR	Cleveland Browns	—
2026	Bernard Gooden	DL	Cleveland Browns	—
2026	Jacobian Guillory	DL	Los Angeles Chargers	—
2026	Chris Hilton Jr.	WR	Washington Commanders	—
2026	Jack Pyburn	DE	Tampa Bay Buccaneers	—
2026	Josh Thompson	OL	Kansas City Chiefs	—
2026	West Weeks	LB	Indianapolis Colts	—
