= White Graves =

American football player (born 1942)

No. 44, 41
- Position: Defensive back

Personal information
- Born: March 20, 1942 (age 84); Crystal Springs, Mississippi, U.S.
- Listed height: 6 ft 0 in (1.83 m)
- Listed weight: 190 lb (86 kg)

Career information
- High school: Crystal Springs
- College: LSU
- AFL draft: 1965: 17th round, 135th overall pick

Career history
- Boston Patriots (1965–1967); Cincinnati Bengals (1968)
- Stats at Pro Football Reference

White Solomon Graves III (born March 20, 1942) is an American former professional football player who was a defensive back for four seasons in the American Football League (AFL) with the Boston Patriots and Cincinnati Bengals. He played college football for the LSU Tigers and was selected by the Patriots in the 17th round of the 1965 AFL draft.

== Early life ==
Graves attended Crystal Springs High School in Crystal Springs, Mississippi.

Graves played college football for the LSU Tigers. He was named to the Academic All-SEC team in 1964.

== Professional career ==
Graves was selected by the Boston Patriots with the 135th pick in the 1965 AFL draft. He played in forty games for the Patriots from 1965 to 1967.

He played in two games for the Cincinnati Bengals during the 1968 season.

== Personal life ==
His son, Sol Graves, played quarterback for the LSU Tigers.
