= Pat Screen =

American lawyer (1943–1994)

James Patrick "Pat" Screen Jr.

Mayor-President East Baton Rouge Parish, Baton Rouge, Louisiana, United States
- In office 1981–1988
- Preceded by: W.W. Dumas
- Succeeded by: Tom Ed McHugh

Personal details
- Born: May 13, 1943 New Orleans, Louisiana, U.S.
- Died: September 12, 1994 (aged 51) New Orleans, Louisiana, U.S.
- Party: Democratic
- Spouse: Kathleen Clare McCall Screen
- Children: James Patrick Screen III; Thomas McCall Screen; Mary Shannon Screen Beacham
- Education: Jesuit High School (New Orleans); Louisiana State University
- Occupation: Attorney

James Patrick Screen Jr., known as Pat Screen (May 13, 1943 – September 12, 1994), was an athlete, attorney, and politician from New Orleans. He was elected in 1980 as the Democratic Mayor-President of East Baton Rouge Parish from 1981 to 1988. He had been a quarterback for Louisiana State University and played in the 1966 Cotton Bowl.

== Football athlete ==
Pat Screen was born in New Orleans as the son of James P. Screen (1914–1994) and Rosemary T. Screen (1921–2002). He played football as a high school sophomore at Jesuit High School in New Orleans.

He continued to play at LSU in Baton Rouge. In 1963, he sustained a separated shoulder in the fourth game against the University of Miami. In the 1964 game against LSU's arch-rival Ole Miss, Screen was injured, and played with a heavily taped knee. He hit nine of ten passes in an early 69-yard drive that gave the Tigers a 3–0 lead. In the second quarter, pain forced Screen to yield to Billy Ezell. LSU prevailed 10-9 as the result of an unexpected two-point conversion In 1965, Screen was drafted in the tenth round by the Cleveland Browns.

Screen did not play professionally but returned to the university to earn an LSU law degree. He joined a practice in criminal law in Baton Rouge in 1970. One of his law partners was City Judge Ossie Brown. In 1972 Brown was elected as East Baton Rouge Parish district attorney and served two terms.

== Political career ==
Screen became active in politics, joining the Democratic Party. In 1971, Screen served on the committee to elect his fellow Democrat Jamar Adcock, a banker from Monroe, as lieutenant governor. They wanted to position him to succeed C. C. "Taddy" Aycock of Franklin in St. Mary Parish, but the latter did not win the governorship. The position was won by Jimmy Fitzmorris, a former New Orleans City Councilman, and he was re-elected to a second term.

In 1980, Screen won the mayoral position, a combined municipal-parish office in Baton Rouge. He succeeded Democratic incumbent W.W. Dumas of Baker. He was re-elected in 1984. Screen was the only Baton Rouge resident to serve as mayor-president from 1965 through 2004; predecessor Dumas and later successor Bobby Simpson (2001–04) were residents of Baker; his immediate successor, Tom Ed McHugh (1989-2000), lived in Zachary.

In 1987, Screen and Mary Olive Pierson, his aide during his first term, were indicted on one count each of malfeasance in the misapplication of road project funds prior to his successful re-election campaign in 1984. Screen and Pierson maintained their innocence. State Attorney General William Guste later dismissed the charges on legal grounds.

Screen did not seek a third term in 1988. He was succeeded by fellow Democrat Tom Ed McHugh.

== Personal life ==
Pat Screen married the former Kathleen Clare McCall (born 1945). They had one daughter and two sons together.

Screen developed dependence on alcohol and, in his second term as mayor, drugs. Screen was found dead from a drug overdose in September 1994 at the age of 51 in a New Orleans hotel.

His friend and colleague, Walter Monsour, said that Screen had slowly succumbed to "inner demons". At Screen's funeral, Monsour described his friend as "the most talented, passionate person I ever knew, who, unfortunately, was conflicted." Screen was survived by his wife, three children, and parents. Screen is interred at Resthaven Gardens of Memories and Mausoleum in Baton Rouge.

His son Tommy Screen was chosen in 2008 as the third director of the Loyola University Institute of Politics in New Orleans. He has been a protégé of Democrats John Breaux, a former US Senator from Louisiana and political activist James Carville. He succeeded Ed Renwick, who had directed the institute for 38 years.

Political offices
Preceded by W. W. Dumas	Mayor-President of East Baton Rouge Parish, Louisiana; 1981–1988	Succeeded by Tom Ed McHugh
