= Orlando McDaniel =

American football player (1960–2020)

No. 82
- Position: Wide receiver

Personal information
- Born: December 1, 1960; Shreveport, Louisiana, U.S.
- Died: March 28, 2020 (aged 59); Dallas County, Texas, U.S.
- Listed height: 6 ft 0 in (1.83 m)
- Listed weight: 180 lb (82 kg)

Career information
- High school: Lake Charles (Lake Charles, Louisiana)
- College: LSU
- NFL draft: 1982: 2nd round, 50th overall pick

Career history
- Denver Broncos (1982); Miami Dolphins (1984)*
- * Offseason or practice squad member only

Awards and highlights
- Second-team All-SEC (1981)
- Stats at Pro Football Reference

Orlando Keith McDaniel (December 1, 1960 – March 27, 2020) was an American professional football wide receiver. He played college football for the LSU Tigers from 1978 to 1981 and for the Denver Broncos of the National Football League (NFL) in 1982. He appeared in 44 games at LSU, totaling 64 receptions for 1,184 yards and three touchdowns. Selected by the Broncos in the second round of the 1982 NFL draft, he appeared in only three NFL games and did not catch a pass. McDaniel died in March 2020, a victim at age 59 of the COVID-19 pandemic.

== Biography ==
McDaniel was born in Shreveport, Louisiana, and attended Lake Charles High School in Lake Charles, Louisiana. He attended college at Louisiana State University, where he played as a wide receiver for the Tigers. At LSU, he caught 64 passes for 1,184 yards and three touchdowns over four seasons. His 17.5 yards per reception in 1981 ranked second in the Southeastern Conference, and his 719 receiving yards ranked fourth.

McDaniel also ran track, and finished second in 1980 in the NCAA Division I Outdoor Track and Field Championships – Men's 110 meter hurdles. McDaniel was the founder and coach of the North Texas Cheetahs Track Club.

On March 27, 2020, McDaniel died of complications from COVID-19 during the COVID-19 pandemic in Texas.
