= Malcolm Scott (American football) =

American football player (born 1961)

No. 80, 87
- Position: Tight end

Personal information
- Born: July 10, 1961 (age 65); New Orleans, Louisiana, U.S.
- Listed height: 6 ft 4 in (1.93 m)
- Listed weight: 243 lb (110 kg)

Career information
- High school: St. Augustine (New Orleans)
- College: LSU
- NFL draft: 1983: 5th round, 124th overall pick

Career history
- New York Giants (1983); New Orleans Saints (1987)

Awards and highlights
- First-team All-SEC (1981); Second-team All-SEC (1982)

Career NFL statistics
- Receptions: 23
- Receiving yards: 241
- Stats at Pro Football Reference

Malcolm Matthew Scott (born July 10, 1961) is an American former professional football player who was a tight end in the National Football League (NFL) for the New York Giants and New Orleans Saints. He played college football for the LSU Tigers. He was born in New Orleans, Louisiana, and played high school football at St. Augustine.

At Louisiana State University, Scott caught 79 passes for 877 yards and five touchdowns. His receptions and yards both rank third by a tight end in LSU history. He was named a first-team All-Southeastern Conference selection by the Associated Press in 1981.

In the NFL, Scott appeared in 16 games in 1983 for the Giants, catching 17 passes for 206 yards. With the Saints in 1987, he played in three games and had six receptions for 35 yards.
