= Bobby Richards =

American football player (born 1938)

No. 68
- Positions: Defensive end, defensive tackle

Personal information
- Born: October 2, 1938 (age 88); Columbus, Mississippi, U.S.
- Listed height: 6 ft 2 in (1.88 m)
- Listed weight: 245 lb (111 kg)

Career information
- High school: Oak Ridge (TN)
- College: LSU
- NFL draft: 1961: 15th round, 210th overall pick
- AFL draft: 1962: 32nd round, 249th overall pick

Career history
- Philadelphia Eagles (1962–1965); Atlanta Falcons (1966–1967)

Career NFL statistics
- Fumble recoveries: 2
- Sacks: 15.5
- Stats at Pro Football Reference

Robert Griffin Richards (born October 2, 1938) is an American former professional football player who was a defensive lineman in the National Football League (NFL). He played college football for the LSU Tigers before playing in the NFL for six seasons with the Philadelphia Eagles and the Atlanta Falcons.
