= Razzano =

Razzano is a surname. Notable people with the surname include:

- Douglas Razzano (born 1988), American figure skater
- José Razzano (1887–1960), Uruguayan singer and composer
- Rick Razzano (linebacker) (born 1955), National Football League linebacker
- Rick Razzano (disambiguation), multiple people
- Virginie Razzano (born 1983), French tennis player
