= Zach Strief =

American football player and coach (born 1983)

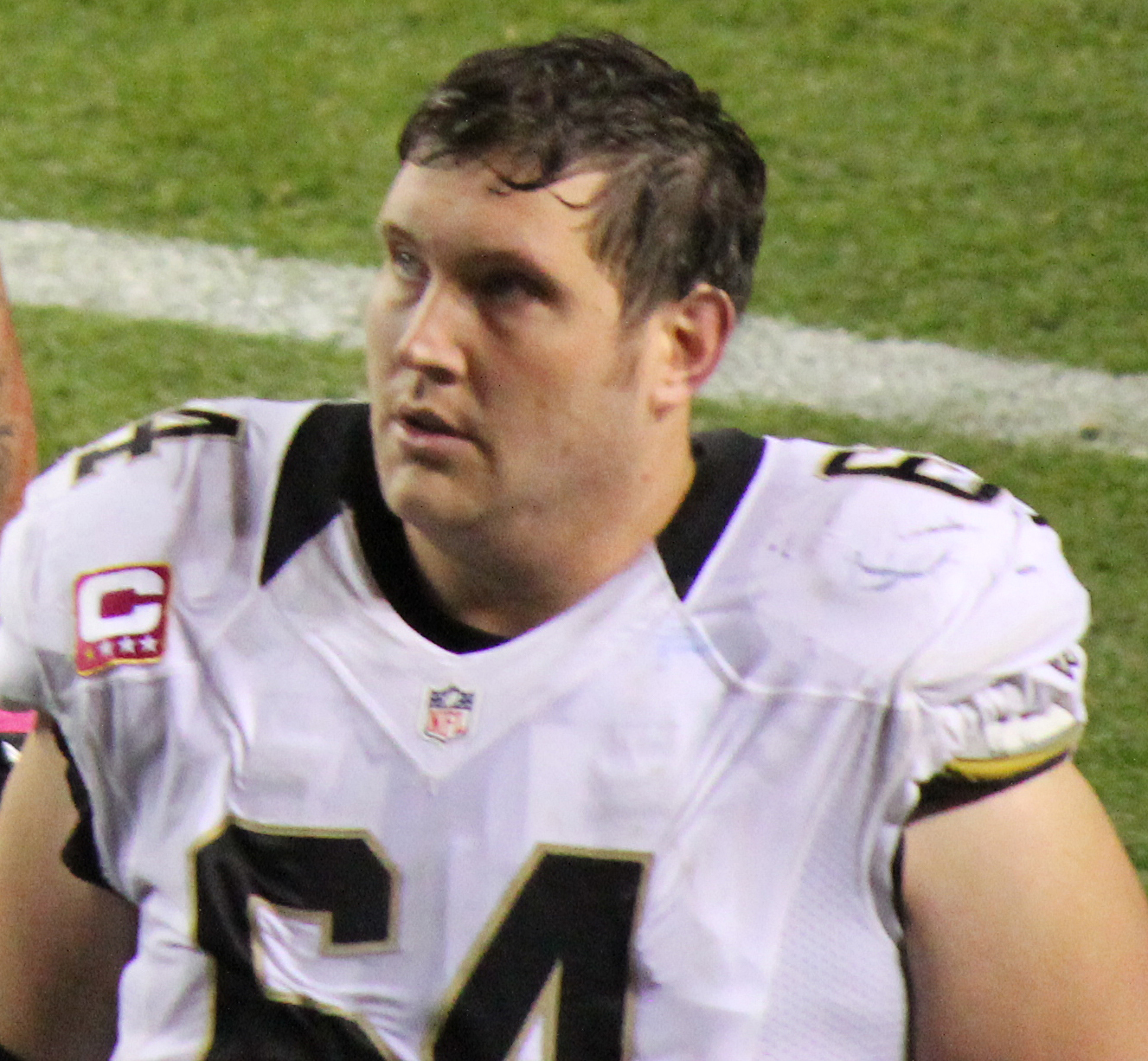
- Strief with the New Orleans Saints in 2012

Denver Broncos
- Title: Assistant head coach & run game coordinator

Personal information
- Born: September 22, 1983 (age 43); Cincinnati, Ohio, U.S.
- Listed height: 6 ft 8 in (2.03 m)
- Listed weight: 320 lb (145 kg)

Career information
- Position: Offensive tackle (No. 64)
- High school: Milford (Milford, Ohio)
- College: Northwestern (2001–2005)
- NFL draft: 2006: 7th round, 210th overall pick

Career history

Playing
- New Orleans Saints (2006–2017)

Coaching
- New Orleans Saints (2021–2022) Assistant offensive line coach; Denver Broncos (2023–present); Offensive line coach (2023–2024); Assistant head coach & offensive run game coordinator (2025–present)

Awards and highlights
- As player: Super Bowl champion (XLIV); Madden Most Valuable Protectors Award (2011); First-team All-American (2005); 2× Second-team All-Big Ten (2004, 2005)

Career NFL statistics
- Games played: 158
- Games started: 94
- Fumble recoveries: 1
- Stats at Pro Football Reference

Zachary David Strief (born September 22, 1983) is an American professional football coach and former offensive tackle who is the offensive run game coordinator and assistant head coach for the Denver Broncos of the National Football League (NFL).

Strief played college football for the Northwestern Wildcats and was selected by the New Orleans Saints in the seventh round of the 2006 NFL draft. He played 12 seasons for the Saints.

== Early life ==
A native of the Cincinnati suburb of Milford, Strief attended Milford High School and earned All-Midwest Region honors with the Eagles football team. Besides football he also earned varsity letters in basketball and track and field. He was also an honor student. In January 2009 Milford High announced to it would retire Strief's number 63 jersey (which he also wore in college), only the second jersey to be retired by Milford.

== College career ==
Strief attended Northwestern University in Evanston and redshirted his first year. By his junior season he became starting right tackle for Wildcats and started in 40 straight games under Mike Dunbar, who was the Wildcats' offensive coordinator. He earned consensus Second-team All-Big Ten honors twice and was named an All-American by the FWAA during his senior season, becoming the Wildcats' first offensive lineman to win national recognition since Chris Hinton. NFLDraftScout.com described him as a "hard worker who has no problems digesting a complicated playbook". He graduated with a degree in communication studies and sociology in 2005.

== Professional career ==
Pre-draft measurables
Height	Weight	Arm length	Hand span	40-yard dash	10-yard split	20-yard split	20-yard shuttle	Three-cone drill	Vertical jump	Broad jump	Bench press	Wonderlic
6 ft 7 5/8 in (2.02 m)	330 lb (150 kg)	33 1/4 in (0.84 m)	9 7/8 in (0.25 m)	5.41 s	1.85 s	3.10 s	4.83 s	8.01 s	21 in (0.53 m)	7 ft 10 in (2.39 m)	19 reps	33
All values from NFL Combine

Strief was selected by the New Orleans Saints in the seventh round of the 2006 NFL draft with the 210th overall pick. After backing up Jon Stinchcomb for five years, in the 2011 season he became the team's starting right tackle with Stinchcomb's retirement and part of the Saints' offensive line that won the Madden Most Valuable Protectors Award as the best offensive line in the NFL. (He also shared in the same award as a backup in 2009.)

Strief was a 2013 Pro Bowl alternate but was not selected to the game.

Strief re-signed with the Saints on a five-year extension during free agency in 2014. This is the second time he re-signed in free agency.

Strief was elected as the Saints' representative to the National Football League Players Association Board of Player Representatives for the 2014 season. He has also served as an offensive team captain since the 2012 season.

In 2017, Strief suffered a knee injury in Week 1 against the Minnesota Vikings and missed the next two weeks. He returned in Week 4, only to re-injure the knee and was placed on injured reserve on October 3, 2017.

On March 12, 2018, Strief announced his retirement from the NFL.

== Coaching career ==
=== New Orleans Saints ===
On March 4, 2021, Strief was hired by the New Orleans Saints as their assistant offensive line coach under head coach Sean Payton, replacing Brendan Nugent, who was promoted to offensive line coach.

=== Denver Broncos ===
On February 6, 2023, it was reported that Strief would follow former coach Sean Payton to the Denver Broncos, where he would become their new offensive line coach.

On March 6, 2025, Strief was promoted to offensive run game coordinator and assistant head coach.

== Broadcasting career ==
On July 25, 2018, Strief was named as the play-by-play voice announcer for Saints radio broadcasts, replacing the retired Jim Henderson. Strief worked with color analyst and former teammate Deuce McAllister on the broadcasts.

== Personal life ==
Strief was previously married to former Saintsation Mandy Schexnaydre.

Since moving to New Orleans, Strief has set up a foundation which organizes youth camps and aids Milford student-athletes. In 2009, he produced a cookbook for charity entitled When You're the Biggest Guy on the Team!

Strief also spearheads the POB initiative along with other former and current Saints players. This initiative provides groceries to COVID-19 survivors, meals for healthcare workers and for those in the artist communities who may be facing food insecurity as a result of the pandemic.

After retiring from the NFL, Strief has opened the brewery Port Orleans in New Orleans.
