= Stinchcomb =

Stinchcomb is a surname. Notable people with the surname include:

- Jon Stinchcomb (born 1979), American football offensive tackle
- Gaylord Stinchcomb (1895–1973), American football player
- Matt Stinchcomb (born 1977), former football offensive tackle
