= Harold Goodwin (American football) =

American football player and coach (born 1973)

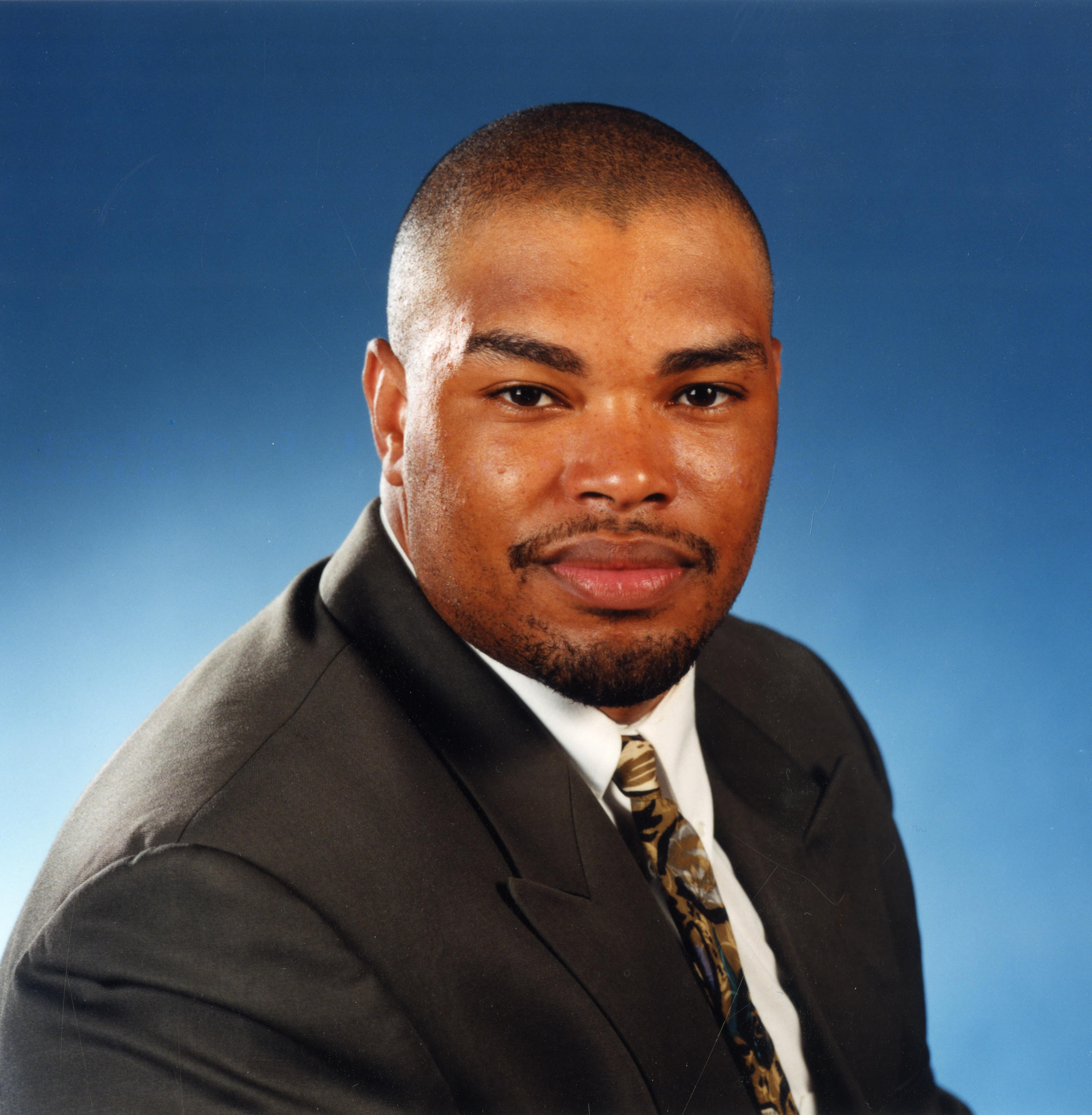
- Goodwin c. 1997

Carolina Panthers
- Title: Assistant head coach & run game coordinator

Personal information
- Born: November 14, 1973 (age 53); Columbia, South Carolina, U.S.

Career information
- Position: Offensive lineman
- High school: Hopkins (SC) Lower Richland
- College: Michigan

Career history
- Michigan (1995–1997) Graduate assistant; Eastern Michigan (1998–1999) Offensive line coach; Central Michigan (2000–2003) Offensive line coach; Chicago Bears (2004–2006) Assistant offensive line coach; Pittsburgh Steelers (2007–2011) Offensive line coach & quality control coordinator; Indianapolis Colts (2012) Offensive line coach; Arizona Cardinals (2013–2017) Offensive coordinator; Tampa Bay Buccaneers (2019–2023) Assistant head coach & run game coordinator; Carolina Panthers (2024–present) Assistant head coach & run game coordinator

Awards and highlights
- 2× Super Bowl champion (XLIII, LV); National champion (1997)
- Coaching profile at Pro Football Reference

Harold Goodwin (born November 14, 1973) is an American football coach who is the assistant head coach and run game coordinator for the Carolina Panthers of the National Football League (NFL). He previously served as an assistant coach for the Arizona Cardinals, Indianapolis Colts, Pittsburgh Steelers, Chicago Bears and Tampa Bay Buccaneers.

== Playing career ==
Goodwin played offensive line for the University of Michigan from 1992 to 1995. He was teammates on the offensive line with Doug Skene, Joe Cocozzo, Steve Everitt, Trezelle Jenkins, and Jon Runyan.

== Coaching career ==
=== Early career ===
Goodwin began his coaching career as a graduate assistant at the University of Michigan from 1995 to 1997, where he worked with former teammates and future pros Steve Hutchinson, Jon Jansen, and Jeff Backus. In 1998, Goodwin moved to Eastern Michigan to serve as assistant offensive line coach, specifically overseeing tight ends and offensive tackles. This role expanded in 1999 to include the entire offensive line. At Eastern Michigan, Goodwin helped develop L. J. Shelton. Goodwin moved to Central Michigan in 2000 to assume the position of offensive line coach, and later assistant head coach. Goodwin helped develop future NFL pros Eric Ghiaciuc and Adam Kieft in his time at Central Michigan.

=== Chicago Bears ===
In 2004, Goodwin was hired by the Chicago Bears as their assistant offensive line coach.

=== Pittsburgh Steelers ===
In 2007, Goodwin was hired by the Pittsburgh Steelers as their offensive line and offensive quality control coach. This involved a responsibility to help coach the offensive line and assist the offensive coaching staff with game preparation, video analysis and scouting of opponents.

=== Indianapolis Colts ===
On January 31, 2012, Goodwin was hired by the Indianapolis Colts as their offensive line coach under head coach Chuck Pagano.

=== Arizona Cardinals ===
On January 19, 2013, Goodwin was hired by the Arizona Cardinals as their offensive coordinator under head coach Bruce Arians.

=== Tampa Bay Buccaneers ===
On January 8, 2019, Goodwin was hired by the Tampa Bay Buccaneers as their assistant head coach and run-game coordinator, reuniting with head coach Bruce Arians. Goodwin earned his second Super Bowl title when the Buccaneers won Super Bowl LV.

=== Carolina Panthers ===
In 2024, Goodwin followed Dave Canales to the Carolina Panthers and became the team's assistant head coach and run game coordinator.

== Personal life ==
Goodwin graduated from the University of Michigan in 1996 with a degree in management and communications. He and his wife, Monica, have three children, one of which, Channing, currently plays wide receiver for the University of Michigan. His younger brother Jonathan is an offensive assistant coach with the Los Angeles Chargers, as well as a former Pro Bowl lineman who won a Super Bowl with the New Orleans Saints.
