= Rick Razzano =

Rick Razzano may refer to:

- Rick Razzano (linebacker) (born 1955), linebacker for the Cincinnati Bengals and Toronto Argonauts
- Rick Razzano (running back) (born 1981), running back for the Tampa Bay Buccaneers
