= Brian de la Puente =

American football player (born 1985)

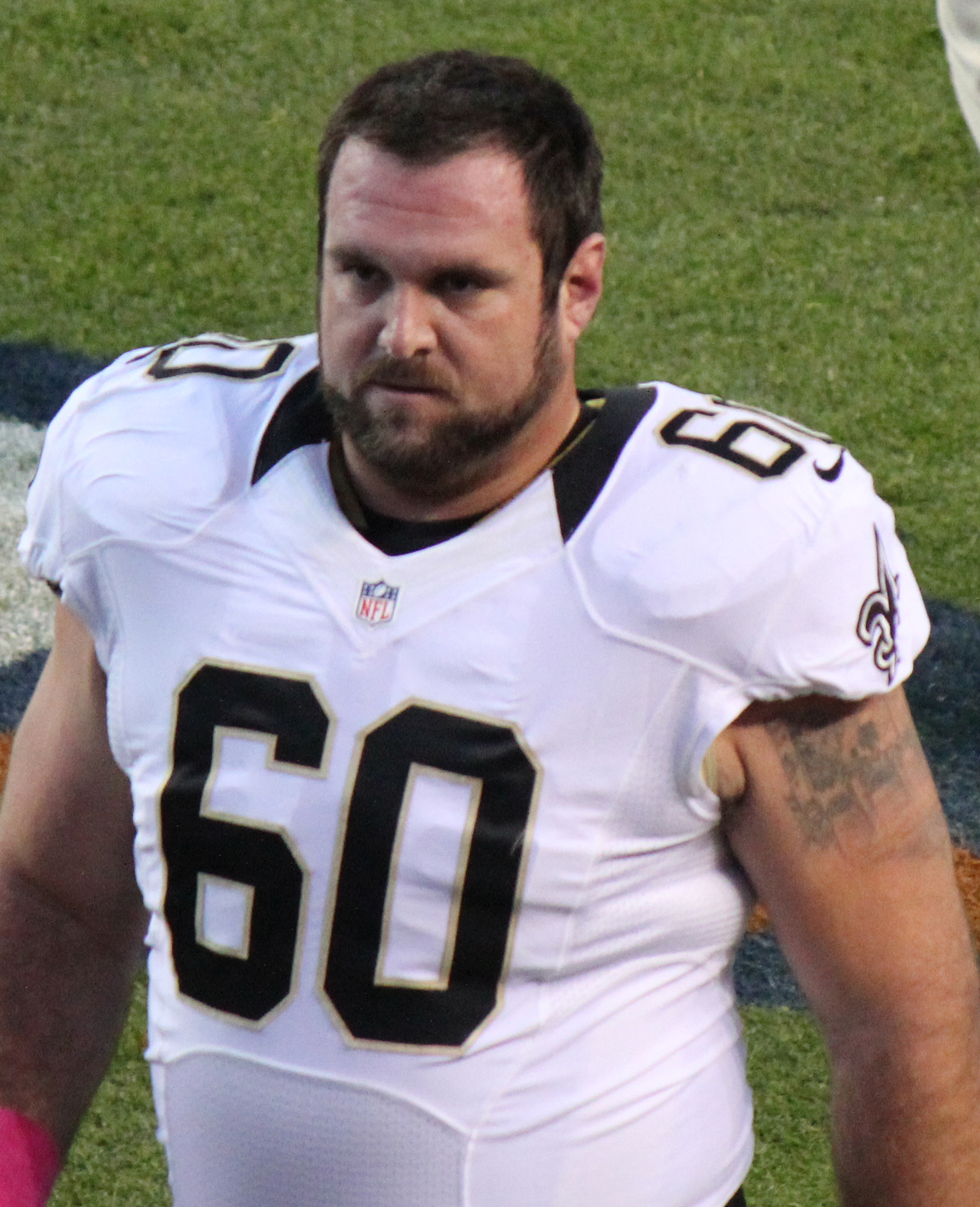
- de la Puente with the New Orleans Saints in 2012

No. 60, 64
- Position: Center

Personal information
- Born: May 13, 1985 (age 41); Los Angeles, California, U.S.
- Listed height: 6 ft 3 in (1.91 m)
- Listed weight: 306 lb (139 kg)

Career information
- High school: San Clemente (San Clemente, California)
- College: California
- NFL draft: 2008: undrafted

Career history
- San Francisco 49ers (2008)*; Kansas City Chiefs (2008); Seattle Seahawks (2009)*; Carolina Panthers (2009)*; San Francisco 49ers (2010)*; Seattle Seahawks (2010)*; New Orleans Saints (2010–2013); Chicago Bears (2014); Washington Redskins (2015)
- * Offseason or practice squad member only

Awards and highlights
- Madden Most Valuable Protectors Award (2012)

Career NFL statistics
- Games played: 61
- Games started: 50
- Stats at Pro Football Reference

Brian Loomis de la Puente (born May 13, 1985) is an American former professional football player who was a center in the National Football League (NFL). He played college football for the California Golden Bears and was signed by the San Francisco 49ers as an undrafted free agent in 2008.

De la Puente was also a member of the Kansas City Chiefs, Seattle Seahawks, Carolina Panthers, New Orleans Saints, Chicago Bears, and Washington Redskins.

== Early life ==
De la Puente is Jewish on his mother Carrie's side, and was born in Los Angeles, California. His maternal grandmother was also Jewish. His grandfather on his father's side is of Mexican descent.

He attended San Clemente High School, where he played football, basketball, and volleyball, was on the track and field team, and was a member of the Superintendent's Honor Roll. He knows sign language, as his youngest sister is deaf.

He played college football for the California Golden Bears at the University of California, Berkeley, where he was a legal studies major.

== Professional career ==
Pre-draft measurables
Height	Weight	40-yard dash	10-yard split	20-yard split	20-yard shuttle	Three-cone drill	Vertical jump	Broad jump	Bench press
6 ft 2 7/8 in (1.90 m)	308 lb (140 kg)	5.40 s	1.84 s	3.12 s	4.77 s	7.62 s	19.5 in (0.50 m)	8 ft 2 in (2.49 m)	25 reps
All values from Pro Day

=== San Francisco 49ers (first stint) ===
After going undrafted in the 2008 NFL draft, De La Puente was signed by the San Francisco 49ers as an undrafted free agent on May 1. He was waived during final cuts on August 30.

=== Kansas City Chiefs ===
De la Puente was signed by the Kansas City Chiefs on August 31, 2008. He was inactive for the team's first seven games before being released on October 29. The Chiefs re-signed him to the practice squad the following day.

De la Puente was re-signed to a future contract by the Chiefs on December 30, 2008. He was waived on August 24, 2009, when the team acquired offensive linemen Andy Alleman and Ikechuku Ndukwe from the Miami Dolphins.

=== Seattle Seahawks (first stint) ===
De la Puente was claimed off waivers by the Seattle Seahawks on August 25, 2009, after the team waived guard Grey Ruegamer. He was cut on September 5, and added to the practice squad on September 16. He was cut from the practice squad on September 22, and re-added on September 30.

=== Carolina Panthers ===
De la Puente was signed to the Carolina Panthers' practice squad on November 17, 2009.

=== San Francisco 49ers (second stint) ===
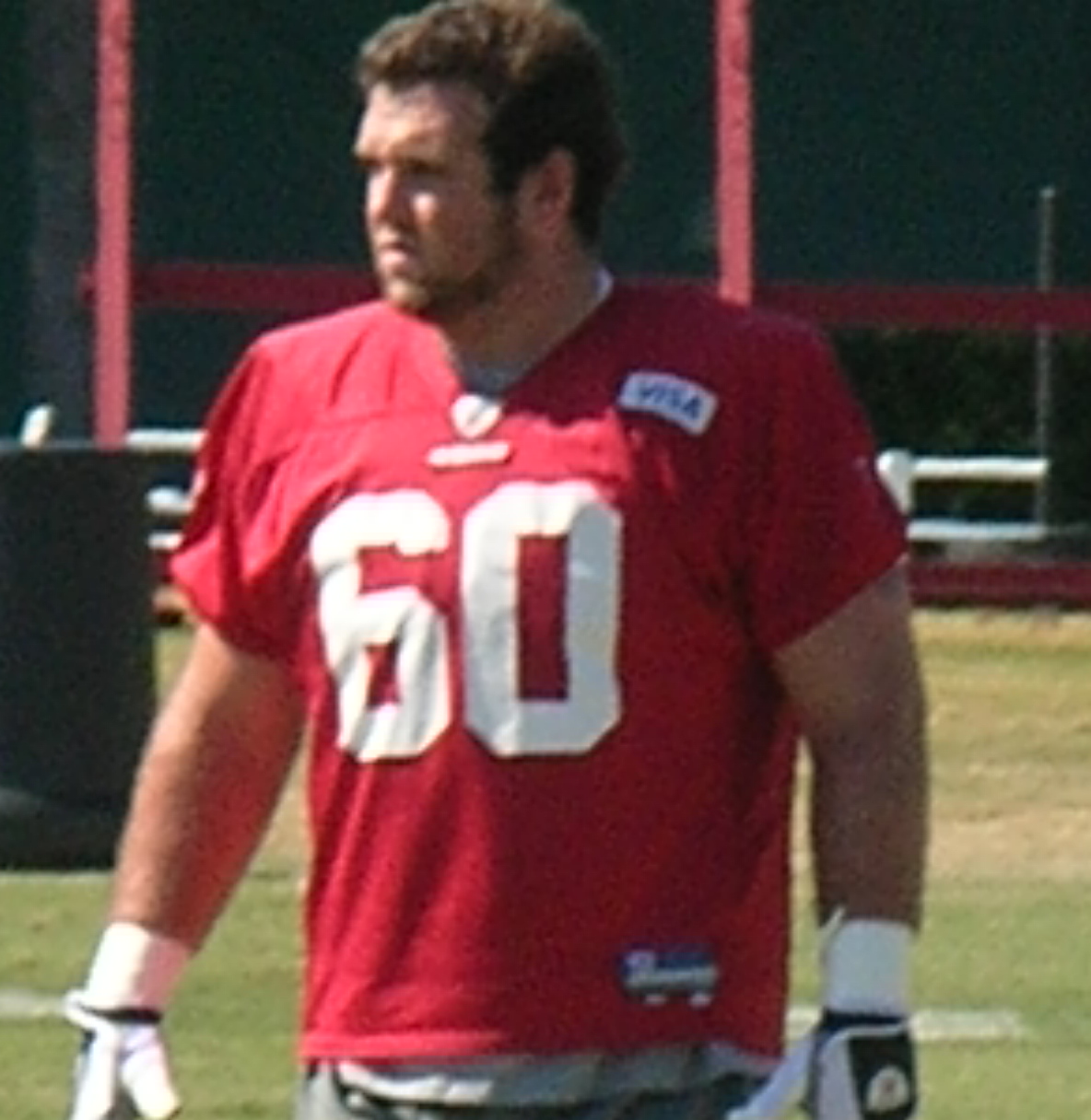
De la Puente at 49ers training camp in August 2010

De la Puente signed a future contract with the San Francisco 49ers on January 22, 2010. He was waived on September 4.

=== Seattle Seahawks (second stint) ===
De la Puente was signed to the Seattle Seahawks' practice squad on September 16, 2010. He was released on September 21.

=== New Orleans Saints ===
De la Puente was signed to the Saints practice squad on October 15, 2010, and spent the rest of the season there.

In 2011, Saints starting center Jonathan Goodwin left to join the San Francisco 49ers, and the Saints signed longtime Chicago Bears star Olin Kreutz to replace him. De la Puente filled in effectively when Kreutz was injured early in the season, then found himself as the starter when Kreutz unexpectedly decided to retire in mid-season. De la Puente continued to play well as the Saints set offensive records for the season and the offensive line won its second Madden Most Valuable Protectors Award in three years.

De la Puente continued to hold the starting center position through the 2012 season. In its 2012 season-end review, Pro Football Focus, calling de la Puente "the least well known player on the line", rated him as the team's highest-performing lineman in 2012.

A restricted free agent after the 2012 season, on April 9, 2013, de la Puente signed the Saints' one-year tender. He was paid $2.023 million for the 2013 season. He started 16 games for the second season in a row.

Over the three seasons De La Puente started for the Saints, he received grades of +6.1 (2013), +23.0 (2012), and +6.1 (2011) from Pro Football Focus.

The New York Daily News reported that the Giants indicated interest in him in March 2014.

=== Chicago Bears ===
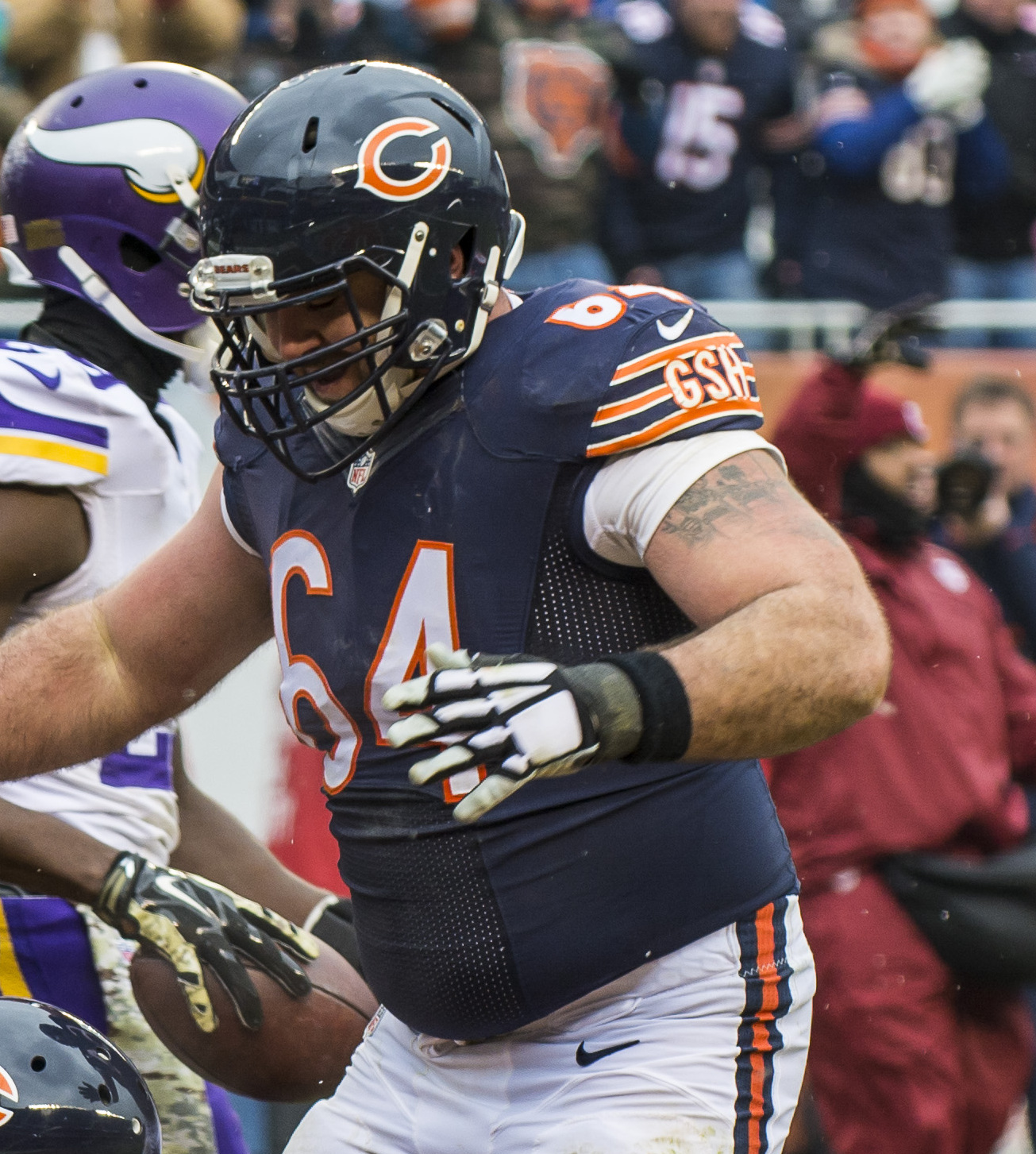
De la Puente playing with the Chicago Bears in 2014

De la Puente was signed to a one-year deal by the Chicago Bears on April 6, 2014. De la Puente was placed on injured reserve on November 26 due to an ankle injury.

=== Washington Redskins ===
De la Puente was signed with the Washington Redskins on November 10, 2015. He was waived on January 5, 2016.

== See also ==
- List of select Jewish football players
