= Milford High School (Ohio) =

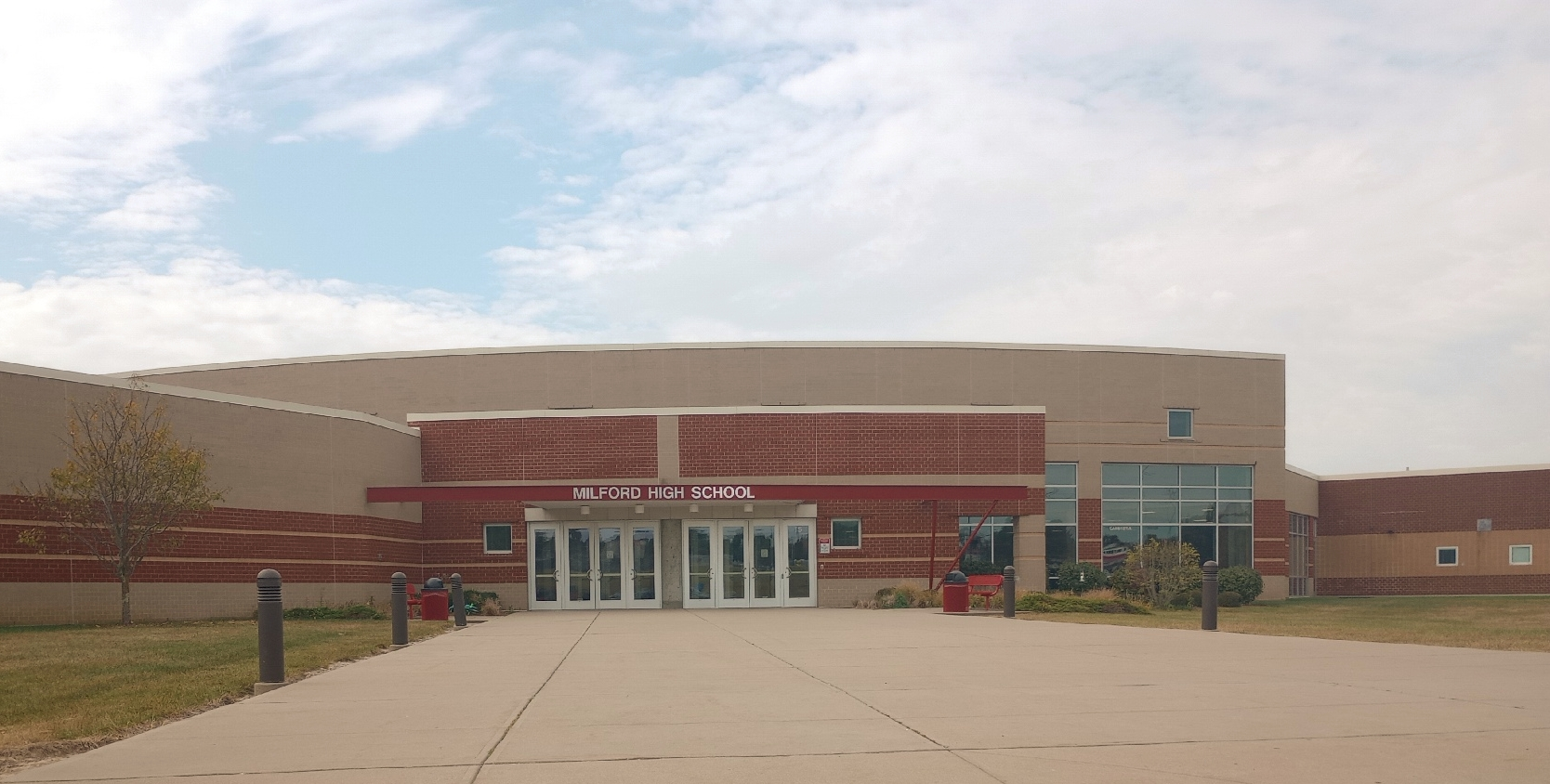
- Milford High School

Location
- One Eagles Way; Milford, Clermont, Ohio 45150; United States; 39°10′49″N 84°14′28″W

Information
- Type: Public, coeducational high school
- Motto: "Wings up!"
- School district: Milford Exempted Village Schools
- Superintendent: Bobbie Fiori
- School code: 363430
- Principal: Kevin Metzger
- Teaching staff: 98.00 (FTE)
- Grades: 9–12
- Enrollment: 1,826 (2023–2024)
- Student to teacher ratio: 18.63
- Colors: Red and White
- Slogan: Milford Soars
- Athletics: Division I
- Athletics conference: Eastern Cincinnati Conference
- Team name: Eagles
- Accreditation: North Central Association of Colleges and Schools
- Newspaper: Reflector
- Yearbook: Droflim
- Website: http://www.milfordschools.org

Milford High School is a college preparatory, public high school in Milford, Ohio, United States. It is the only high school in the Milford Exempted Village School District (MEVSD), the largest building of the district's eight school buildings, and a larger high school in Clermont County, Ohio. The high school and the Milford Exempted Village School District serve the City of Milford and parts of Miami Township and Union Township. Milford is the westernmost high school in Appalachian Ohio.

== Academics ==
Based on its 2017 scorecard, US News recognizes Milford as 36th out of 890 Ohio high schools and 902nd out of over 21,000 nationally. Private schools were not included because they lack state-recognized accountability measures. Milford Schools achieved the state rating of Excellent with Distinction from 2008 through the present. The high school currently offers 24 Advanced Placement (AP) courses and has a 70% student participation rate in AP.

== School history ==
=== Beginnings ===
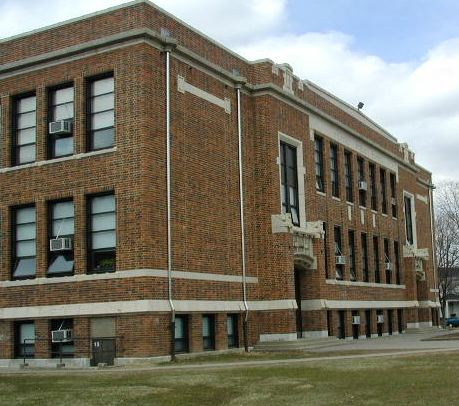
Milford Main (1913-2016), formerly called the Main Street School

Milford Schools’ origins began in log houses and other single room buildings. The traditional schools formally organized in 1867 when voters approved the first board of education and established Milford Union School. An eight-classroom school that included the high school was constructed.

The newly organized high school graduated its first class in 1883. The Union School closed in 1913 when Milford Main, originally called the Main Street School, opened with a total student enrollment of 381. The location in the city housed all grades and was a state-of-the-art building when completed before World War I.

In 1914, Milford High School issued its first yearbook: The Mirror is on file and available for viewing upon request at Promont along with every other yearbook ever issued. In 1919, the yearbook gained a new name, Droflim (Milford spelled backwards), which it continues to have to this day. The Milford Board declared its independence in 1917 when it passed a resolution that relieved the school of higher supervision. At that point, Milford Schools were born. At a time when most schools were strictly segregated throughout the country, Milford was open to all area Ohioans, including Jessie Clark, regardless of ancestry in 1917. Students posed in front of the school for class photos in 1917. Overcrowding has been a problem for Milford schooling since the 1920s. The schools temporarily solved the problem by housing students in temporary buildings or by reducing school to half-day sessions. In 1923, Milford High School started a newspaper called the Hi-Letter, and the name changed to The Reflector in 1933 and has stayed all of these years.

=== Expansion: 1950—1970 ===
Milford education experienced growth following World War II. James H. Fley became Superintendent in 1952. Under Fley’s leadership, Milford expanded from one K-12 school to many different buildings. Milford looked to neighboring school systems to find additional classroom space. In the late 1950s to early 1960s, Ohio initiated a consolidation of school "districts" across the state. Milford merged with Miami Rural Schools and then Miamiville, encompassing education over much of Miami Township. Before the consolidations, Milford schooling covered five square miles.

In 1962, a new Milford High School and Pleasant Hill Elementary, now called Charles Seipelt Elementary, joined Milford South Elementary to provide much needed space for the growing student body. Despite the new buildings, overcrowding continued to be a problem at the high school.

The growth and transformation of the schools continued for the next twenty years under the direction of Boyd E. Smith, who served as Superintendent from 1965 to 1985. The new Milford Junior High (current high school) opened in 1966. Milford Schools moved the ninth grade class to join grades 7-8 at the junior high. The high school handled grades 10-12.

=== Centralization: 1970—2000 ===
Student overcrowding continued into the 1970s as more families moved into the schools and Milford Schools struggled to find enough classroom space. In 1971, Milford Main became a middle school for sixth and seventh graders. Elementary grades were divided among the elementary schools while most kindergarten students attended classes in a variety of churches in the area. In 1978, another bond issue became necessary for the construction of more schools. The plan called for the construction of Boyd E. Smith Elementary and renovations or additions to Main, Miami Elementary on St. Rt. 28, as well as the high school and junior high. In 1980, renovation work began at the high school (current junior high). On April 1, 2005, the high school was the site of a raid by Miami Township police following an undercover operation into drug trafficking at the school.

== Athletics ==
Ohio High School Athletic Association State Championships

- Girls Cross Country – 2026

== Notable alumni ==
- Michael A. Banks (class of 1969), New York Times bestselling author
- John Van Benschoten (class of 1998), former Major League Baseball player
- Barry Bonnell (class of 1971), former Major League Baseball player, Atlanta Braves, Toronto Blue Jays and Seattle Mariners
- Mark Fischbach (class of 2007), YouTuber known as "Markiplier"
- Napoleon McCallum (class of 1981), former National Football League player, Los Angeles Raiders
- Rick Razzano (class of 1999), former National Football League player, Tampa Bay Buccaneers
- Zach Strief (class of 2001), former National Football League player, New Orleans Saints
- Jim Terrell (class of 1983), US Olympic canoeist; 1984, 1988, 1992, 1996

== See also ==
- Milford, Ohio
- Clermont County, Ohio
