= Madden Most Valuable Protectors award =

American football offensive line award

Madden Most Valuable Protectors Award
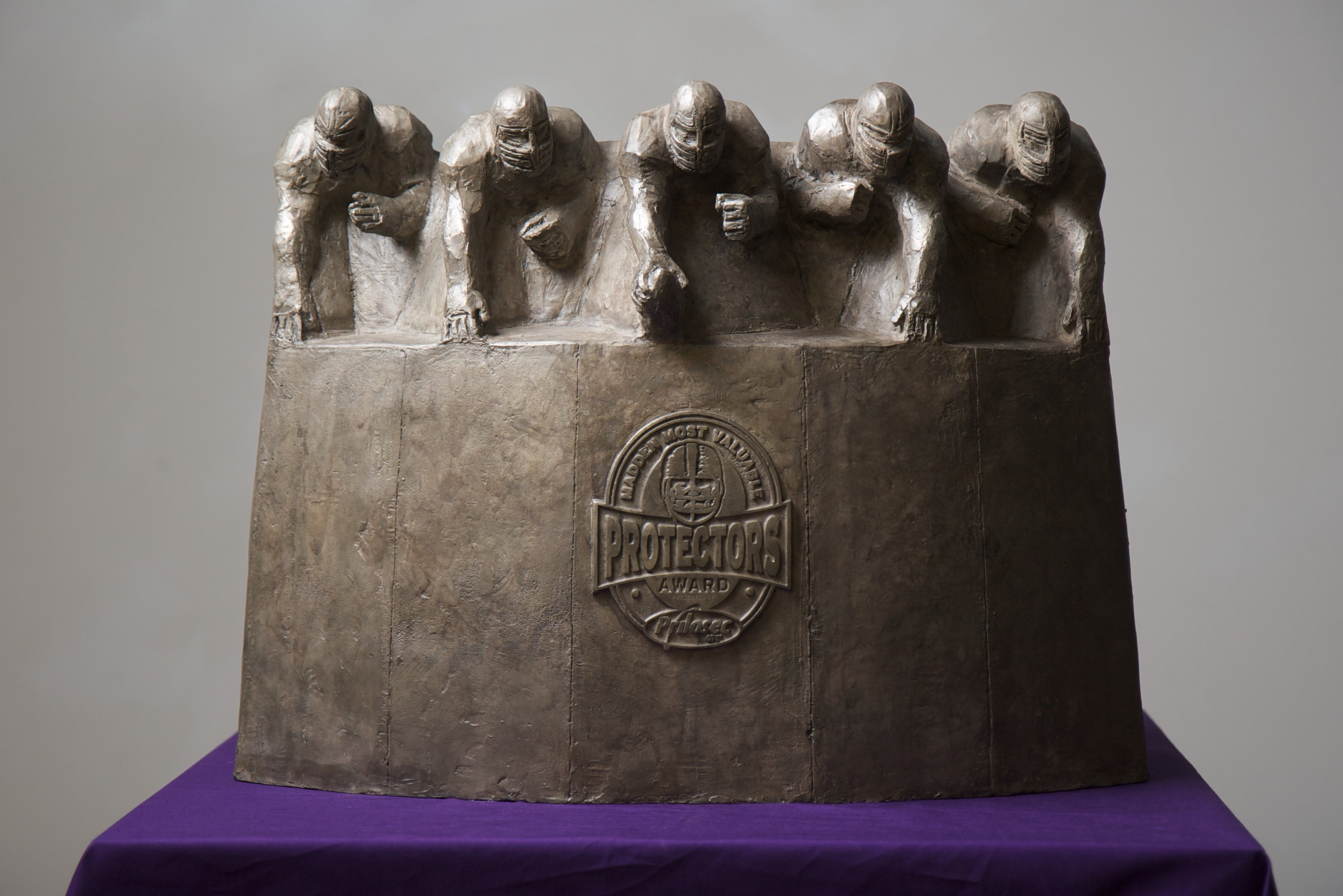
- Awarded for: Awarded annually to the best offensive line.
- Country: United States
- Presented by: National Football League
- First award: 2009
- Final award: 2012
- Website: www.nfl.com/voting/protectors/2011/YEAR/0

The Madden Most Valuable Protectors award was a trophy awarded annually to the best offensive line of the National Football League. The trophy, sponsored by Prilosec OTC, is named in honor of former NFL coach and commentator, John Madden. Designed and sculpted by artist Tom Tsuchiya, the award's shape is meant to evoke a castle wall with the figures of the five offensive line players representing battlements. The bronze trophy, finished with a silver nitrate patina, weighs 102 lbs (42.3 kg) and stands 16 1/2" (42 cm) tall.

Five offensive lines were selected as finalists by John Madden and a team of four from the NFL Network: Jamie Dukes, Marshall Faulk, Rich Eisen and Steve Mariucci before an online fan vote at NFL.com which would determine the winner.

== Winners ==
=== List ===
Season	Team	Left Tackle	Left Guard	Center	Right Guard	Right Tackle	Ref.
2009	New Orleans	Jermon Bushrod	Carl Nicks	Jonathan Goodwin	Jahri Evans	Jon Stinchcomb	
2010	New England	Matt Light	Logan Mankins	Dan Koppen	Dan Connolly	Sebastian Vollmer	
2011	New Orleans	Jermon Bushrod	Carl Nicks	Brian de la Puente	Jahri Evans	Zach Strief	
2012	San Francisco	Joe Staley	Mike Iupati	Jonathan Goodwin	Alex Boone	Anthony Davis	

=== 2009 ===
The line of the New Orleans Saints became the inaugural winner of the trophy (for the 2009 season) on February 2, 2010 during the week leading up to Super Bowl XLIV. The Saints' offensive line included Jermon Bushrod, Carl Nicks, Jahri Evans, Jonathan Goodwin and Jon Stinchcomb. Each name of the members of the winning line will be engraved on the back of the trophy. Because the trophy is one of a kind, it will travel from one winning line's city to the next.

=== 2010 ===
The New England Patriots' line was selected as the NFL's best offensive line for the 2010 regular season. The five finalists in 2010 were the offensive lines of the Atlanta Falcons, Kansas City Chiefs, New England Patriots, 2009 winners New Orleans Saints and the New York Giants. The Patriots' offensive line consisted of: starting Tackles Matt Light and Sebastian Vollmer, starting Guards Dan Connolly and Logan Mankins, starting Center Dan Koppen and backups Mark LeVoir (T), Stephen Neal (G), Rich Ohrnberger (G/C), Quinn Ojinnaka (T/G) and Ryan Wendell (C). Behind their powerful offensive line the Patriots led the league in points per game (32.4), ranked 4th in sacks allowed (25), finished 8th in average yards (363.8), ranked 9th in average rushing yards (123.3) and ranked 11th in passing yards per game (240.4).

=== 2011 ===
The New Orleans Saints won the award for the second time for their play during the 2011 regular season. The five finalists in 2011 were the offensive lines of the Denver Broncos, Green Bay Packers, Houston Texans, 2010 winners New England Patriots and the 2009 winners New Orleans Saints. The Saints' line consisted of: Tackles Zach Strief, Jermon Bushrod and Charles Brown, Guards Carl Nicks and Jahri Evans and Centers Brian De La Puente and Matt Tennant. Behind their dominant offensive line the Saints had the top-ranked offense in the league with a league record 467.1 yards per game. They also ranked 2nd in sacks allowed (24 sacks), ranked 1st in total passing yards on the season (5,347), 6th in total rushing yards (2127), and finished 2nd in total points scored on the season (547). Quarterback Drew Brees would also break Dan Marino's 27-year-old record for most passing yards in a season behind the line.

=== 2012 ===
The San Francisco 49ers won the award for their play during the 2012 regular season. The line was composed of Pro Bowlers Joe Staley and Mike Iupati at left tackle and left guard, respectively, center Jonathan Goodwin, who previously won the award with the New Orleans Saints, right guard Alex Boone and right tackle Anthony Davis.

== See also ==
- Built Ford Tough Offensive Line of the Year
- NFL Protector of the Year
