= Jahri Evans =

American football player and administrator (born 1983)

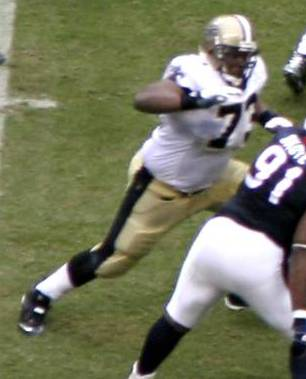
- Evans with the New Orleans Saints in 2007

Pittsburgh Steelers
- Title: Assistant offensive line coach

Personal information
- Born: August 22, 1983 (age 43); Philadelphia, Pennsylvania, U.S.
- Listed height: 6 ft 4 in (1.93 m)
- Listed weight: 318 lb (144 kg)

Career information
- Position: Guard (No. 73)
- High school: Frankford (Philadelphia)
- College: Bloomsburg (2002–2005)
- NFL draft: 2006: 4th round, 108th overall pick

Career history

Playing
- New Orleans Saints (2006–2015); Seattle Seahawks (2016)*; New Orleans Saints (2016); Green Bay Packers (2017)
- * Offseason or practice squad member only

Coaching
- New Orleans Saints (2022–2025); Preseason coaching intern (2022); Offensive assistant (2023–2024); Assistant offensive line coach (2025); Pittsburgh Steelers (2026–present) Assistant offensive line coach

Operations
- Philadelphia Soul (2015–2019) Minority owner; Albany Empire (2018–2019) Minority owner; Atlantic City Blackjacks (2019) Minority owner

Awards and highlights
- Super Bowl champion (XLIV); 4× First-team All-Pro (2009–2012); Second-team All-Pro (2013); 6× Pro Bowl (2009–2014); NFL 2010s All-Decade Team; PFWA All-Rookie Team (2006); Pro Football Weekly All-Rookie Team (2006); 2× Madden Most Valuable Protectors Award (2009, 2011); New Orleans Saints 50th Anniversary Team; New Orleans Saints Hall of Fame; 2× Division II Little All-American (2004, 2005)

Career NFL statistics
- Games played: 183
- Games started: 183
- Stats at Pro Football Reference

Jahri Divine Evans (born August 22, 1983) is an American football coach and former football guard who played in the National Football League (NFL). He currently serves as the assistant offensive line coach for the Pittsburgh Steelers. He played college football for the Bloomsburg Huskies. Evans was selected by the New Orleans Saints in the fourth round of the 2006 NFL draft and won Super Bowl XLIV with the team over the Indianapolis Colts. He has also been a member of the Seattle Seahawks and Green Bay Packers.

Although only a fourth round draft pick from a small school, Evans established a reputation as one of the best guards in the NFL, and in May 2010 the Saints signed him to a contract that made him the highest-paid guard in NFL history at the time.

== Early life ==
Unusual for an NFL player, Evans did not play football until high school. He attended Frankford High School in Philadelphia, Pennsylvania, where he was an All-Public League selection as a junior. However, Evans fractured his leg playing a game of pickup basketball at a church event prior to his senior year and missed the entire football season. While sidelined he focused on academics, graduating 10th in his class, and with the help of his high school coach, Tom Mullineaux, was admitted to Bloomsburg University of Pennsylvania. In fact, Evans did not attend Bloomsburg on an athletic scholarship, but rather an academic scholarship.

== College career ==
Evans attended Bloomsburg University of Pennsylvania, where he played for the Bloomsburg Huskies football team. After redshirting his first year, he spent his freshman season as a reserve offensive tackle. He was heavily motivated to make the starting lineup, battling Kyle Miller for the position who had played with Pennsylvania's Lakeland High School Chiefs. By his sophomore year, he took over as the starter at left tackle and went on to anchor the Huskies offensive line for the following three seasons. He was awarded All-Pennsylvania State Athletic Conference honors in each of those seasons, while earning Division II "Little All-American" selections in his junior and senior years.

As a junior, Evans had 88 knockdowns with 10 blocks resulting in a touchdown. In his senior season, he opened holes for fellow Little All-America selection Jamar Brittingham, who ran for 2,260 yards and 32 touchdowns. He was a finalist for the Division II Gene Upshaw Offensive Player of the Year Award in each of final two seasons.

Fraternity Membership

In addition to his academic and athletic achievements, Jahri Evans also engaged in Greek life during his time at Bloomsburg University. He pledged the Alpha Eta chapter of Omega Psi Phi fraternity. as an undergraduate. His involvement with the fraternity continued well beyond his college years, as he is not only a life member of Omega Psi Phi but also actively participates in the fraternity's activities through the Eta Mu Nu chapter.

== Professional career ==
Entering the 2006 NFL draft, Evans was seen as a developmental prospect and was projected to move from offensive tackle to guard in the NFL. He was evaluated as an early seventh round pick by Sports Illustrated.

Pre-draft measurables
Height	Weight	Arm length	Hand span	40-yard dash	10-yard split	20-yard split	20-yard shuttle	Three-cone drill	Vertical jump	Broad jump	Bench press
6 ft 4 1/2 in (1.94 m)	316 lb (143 kg)	34 1/8 in (0.87 m)	10 in (0.25 m)	5.25 s	1.79 s	3.02 s	4.80 s	7.97 s	27.0 in (0.69 m)	7 ft 11 in (2.41 m)	20 reps
All values from NFL Combine

=== New Orleans Saints ===
Evans was selected in the fourth round (108th overall) by the Saints, after they had traded their early fourth-round pick in the draft to the Philadelphia Eagles for veteran defensive tackle Hollis Thomas and the Eagles' mid-fourth-round pick. Evans was the first Bloomsburg player drafted since Eric Jonassen went 140th overall to the San Diego Chargers in the 1992 NFL draft. Evans was signed to a three-year contract by the Saints on July 25, 2006. He emerged as a consistent performer in training camp and preseason, and won the starting job after the projected starter, Jermane Mayberry, was injured in training camp and ultimately retired. In his rookie year, Evans started all 16 games, and both playoff games, at right guard. He was subsequently named to the Pro Football Weekly All-Rookie team.

In his second year, Evans started all 16 games at right guard again, and contributed to an offense that ranked No. 3 overall in the NFL. Remaining a starter in 2008, Evans was part of an offensive line that allowed just 13 sacks on the season, a Saints franchise record.

Having established himself as one of the NFL's top right guards in 2009, Evans was named to the 2010 Pro Bowl NFC roster, being only the fourth guard to make the Pro Bowl in the Saints' 43-year franchise history. Jake Kupp made the Pro Bowl in 1969, Brad Edelman was honored in 1987, and LeCharles Bentley went in 2003.

Evans was a restricted free agent after the 2009 season, and on May 11, 2010, the Saints resigned Evans to a seven-year, $56.7 million contract that was reported to make Evans the highest-paid interior offensive lineman in NFL history, surpassing Alan Faneca's five-year, $40 million deal with the New York Jets in 2008. He was ranked 34th by his fellow players on the NFL Top 100 Players of 2011.

On February 8, 2016, the Saints released Evans.

=== Seattle Seahawks ===
On August 6, 2016, Evans signed a one-year deal with the Seattle Seahawks. He was released on September 2, at the end of the preseason.

=== New Orleans Saints (second stint) ===
On September 7, 2016, Evans returned to the Saints, signing a one-year deal. Also in 2016, Evans was named to the Saints All-50th Team. In Week 8 of the 2016 season, Evans helped pave the way for running backs Tim Hightower and Mark Ingram II as the pair ran for a combined 245 yards and two touchdowns. Evans also helped the two backs again at home against the Los Angeles Rams in Week 11, rushing for a combined 197 yards and one touchdown. Evans was also important in the success of a 21-yard screen pass from quarterback Drew Brees to Ingram, resulting in a touchdown that same week.

=== Green Bay Packers ===
On April 26, 2017, Evans signed with the Green Bay Packers. He started 14 games at right guard for the Packers in 2017.

== Coaching career ==
Evans served as a preseason coaching intern in 2022 with the New Orleans Saints as part of the NFL's minority coach internship program. He joined the Saints full time staff as an offensive assistant during the 2023 season. He was inducted into the Saints Ring of Honor on July 31, 2024. On April 11, 2025, it was announced that Evans would remain on New Orleans' staff as an assistant offensive line coach under Kellen Moore.

On January 30, 2026, Evans left the Saints to fill the same role for the Pittsburgh Steelers, reuniting him with Mike McCarthy, his former head coach in Green Bay.

== Personal life ==
Evans graduated from Bloomsburg in May 2007 with a bachelor's degree in exercise science. In 2009, he established a full scholarship for out-of-state minority students enrolled in BU's Master of Science in clinical athletic training program. He is a member of the Omega Psi Phi fraternity.

In 2013, Evans married his girlfriend, Takia, in the Bahamas.

In August 2015, Evans bought a share of the Philadelphia Soul of the Arena Football League, joining his Saints teammate Marques Colston, who had bought a piece of the team in 2014.
