= Grey Ruegamer =

American football player, coach, and executive (born 1976)

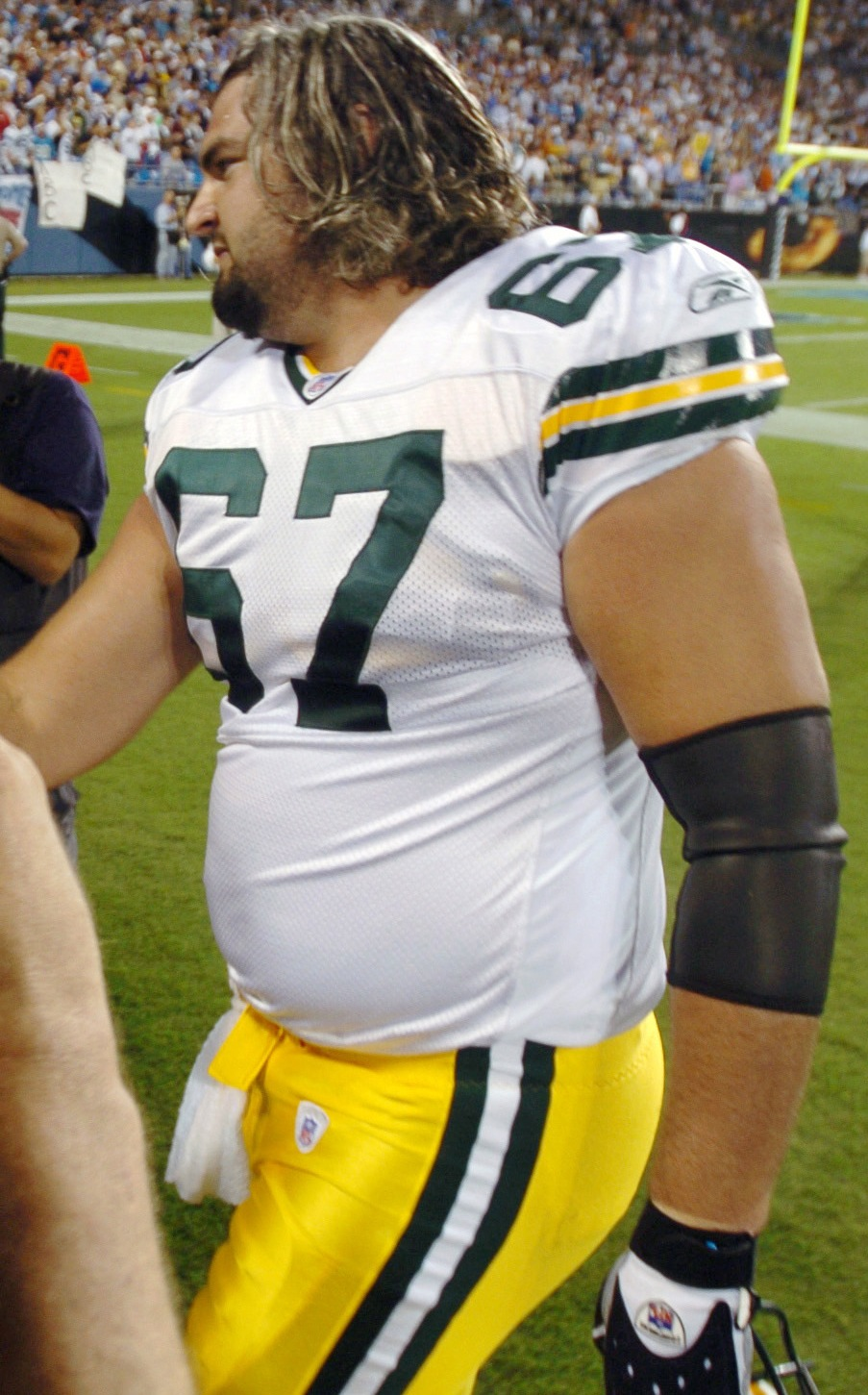
- Ruegamer with the Green Bay Packers in 2005

Green Bay Packers
- Title: Director of player engagement

Personal information
- Born: June 1, 1976 (age 50); Las Vegas, Nevada, U.S.
- Listed height: 6 ft 4 in (1.93 m)
- Listed weight: 299 lb (136 kg)

Career information
- Position: Center (No. 67, 65)
- High school: Bishop Gorman (Las Vegas)
- College: Arizona State
- NFL draft: 1999: 3rd round, 72nd overall pick

Career history

Playing
- Miami Dolphins (1999); Pittsburgh Steelers (2000)*; New England Patriots (2000–2002); Green Bay Packers (2003–2005); New York Giants (2006–2008); Seattle Seahawks (2009)*
- * Offseason or practice squad member only

Coaching
- Washington (2009–2010, 2013) Assistant strength and conditioning coach

Operations
- Green Bay Packers (2017–present) Director of player engagement

Awards and highlights
- 2× Super Bowl champion (XXXVI, XLII); 2× First-team All-Pac-10 (1997, 1998)

Career NFL statistics
- Games played: 124
- Games started: 17
- Stats at Pro Football Reference

Christopher Grey Ruegamer [ROO-gah-mer] (born June 1, 1976) is an American former professional football player who was a center, and currently is the director of player engagement for the Green Bay Packers of the National Football League (NFL). He played college football for the Arizona State Sun Devils and was selected by the Miami Dolphins in the third round of the 1999 NFL draft.

Ruegamer was also a member of the Pittsburgh Steelers, New England Patriots, Green Bay Packers, New York Giants and Seattle Seahawks. He has earned two Super Bowl rings in his career, with the Patriots in Super Bowl XXXVI and with the Giants in Super Bowl XLII.

== College career ==
Ruegamer played college football at Arizona State University, where he was a four-year starter. Ruegamer played for the Sun Devils in the 1997 Rose Bowl.

== Professional career ==
Pre-draft measurables
Height	Weight	Arm length	Hand span	40-yard dash	10-yard split	20-yard split	20-yard shuttle	Three-cone drill	Vertical jump	Broad jump	Bench press
6 ft 4 3/8 in (1.94 m)	315 lb (143 kg)	31 7/8 in (0.81 m)	8 1/4 in (0.21 m)	5.29 s	1.80 s	3.02 s	4.68 s	8.22 s	27.0 in (0.69 m)	7 ft 10 in (2.39 m)	18 reps
All values from NFL Combine

=== Miami Dolphins ===
Ruegamer was originally selected 72nd overall by the Miami Dolphins in the third round of the 1999 NFL draft. He did not appear in a game his rookie season. The Dolphins waived Ruegamer on August 26, 2000.

=== Pittsburgh Steelers ===
Ruegamer was signed to the practice squad of the Pittsburgh Steelers on August 29, 2000. He remained there until being signed by the New England Patriots on November 16.

=== New England Patriots ===
Ruegamer played for the New England Patriots from 2000 to 2002, and appeared in the team's Super Bowl XXXVI victory over St. Louis Rams in 2001.

=== Green Bay Packers ===
Ruegamer played for the Green Bay Packers from 2003 to 2005. He started 11 games for the Green Bay Packers in 2004 on a line that set single-season team records for fewest sacks allowed (14), first downs (354), net yards (6,357), and net passing yards (4,449).

=== New York Giants ===
Ruegamer signed with the New York Giants in 2006 and played three seasons with the team. He appeared in New York's Super Bowl XLII victory over the New England Patriots.

=== Seattle Seahawks ===
Ruegamer was signed by the Seattle Seahawks on July 31, 2009. He was released on August 25 when the team claimed center Brian De La Puente off waivers.

== Personal ==
Ruegamer's Uncle Bob played with the University of Minnesota in the 1961 and 1962 Rose Bowls.

Ruegamer has a Basque family friend and has helped the friend castrate lamb with his teeth.

Ruegamer is a prankster and is also known for showing up to Friday practices in costume. He keeps all his toenail clippings and callous shavings in a cup all season long. If anyone messes with him and he deems it necessary, he will dump the cup in personal belongings of theirs.
