= Alex Boone =

American football player (born 1987)

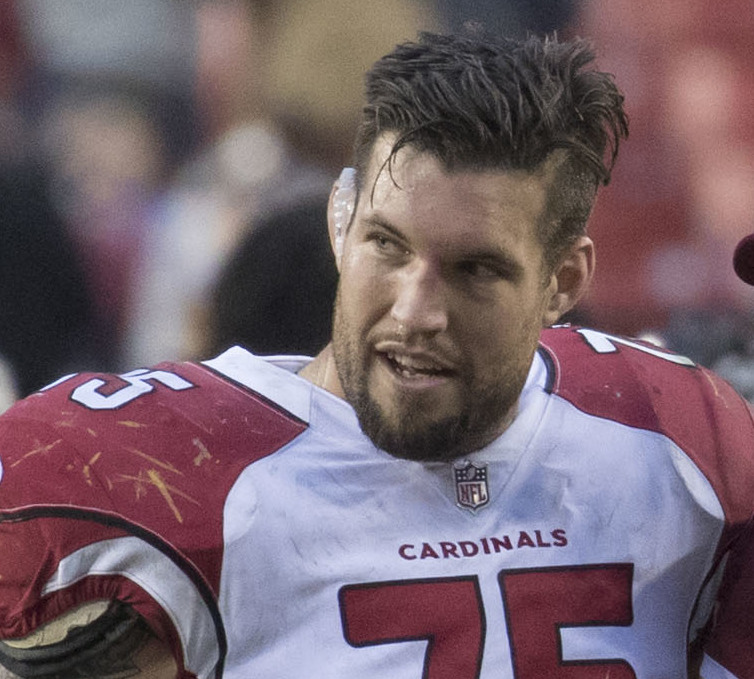
- Boone with the Arizona Cardinals in 2017

No. 75, 76, 78
- Position: Guard and a tackle

Personal information
- Born: May 4, 1987 (age 39); Lakewood, Ohio, U.S.
- Listed height: 6 ft 8 in (2.03 m)
- Listed weight: 310 lb (141 kg)

Career information
- High school: St. Edward (Lakewood, Ohio)
- College: Ohio State (2005–2008)
- NFL draft: 2009: undrafted

Career history
- San Francisco 49ers (2009–2015); Minnesota Vikings (2016); Arizona Cardinals (2017); Seattle Seahawks (2020)

Awards and highlights
- Madden Most Valuable Protectors Award (2012); Second-team All-American (2008); First-team All-Big Ten (2008); Second-team All-Big Ten (2007)

Career NFL statistics
- Games played: 167
- Games started: 86
- Stats at Pro Football Reference

Alexander Boone (born May 4, 1987) is an American former professional football player who was a guard in the National Football League (NFL). He played college football for the Ohio State Buckeyes. He was signed by the San Francisco 49ers as an undrafted free agent in 2009. He also played in the NFL with the Minnesota Vikings, Arizona Cardinals, and Seattle Seahawks.

== Early life ==
Boone played high school football at St. Edward High School in Lakewood, Ohio, where he was a three-year starter and earned USA Today and Parade All-American honors in his senior year. He was also a first-team All-Ohio selection in both his junior season in which St. Edward lost in the state championship game, and senior season. Following his high school career, Boone was invited to play in the U.S. Army All-American Bowl in December, and the following month he enrolled at Ohio State.

In addition to football, Boone also lettered in track & field for two years at St. Edward, throwing the shot put (personal-best of 56'1" or 14.05m) and the discus and also played basketball for a year.

Boone committed to Ohio State University on January 8, 2003, during his junior year. Coming out of high school, Boone was considered one of the nation's top offensive line prospects and a Top-20 recruit by Rivals.com. Boone enrolled at Ohio State early (the start of Winter Quarter 2005) to get a head start.

== College career ==
A two-time All-Big Ten selection during his 4-year career at Ohio State, Boone played college football at Ohio State University, appearing in 46 games with 35 starts (22 of them at left tackle) for the Buckeyes. A four-year starter from 2005 to 2008, Boone was a two-time All-Big Ten selection (second-team in 2007 and first-team in 2008). In his four years with the Buckeyes, Ohio State compiled a 41–8 record and captured four Big Ten Conference titles and played in four BCS Bowl appearances.

=== Freshman season (2005) ===
As a freshman, Boone played in 11 of the Buckeyes' 12 games for a total of 126 minutes.

=== Sophomore season (2006) ===
In his second season, Boone started the first nine games at left tackle, but missed the next two (Illinois in Week 10 and Northwestern in Week 11) before returning as a reserve against Michigan on November 18. He was back in the starting lineup in the national championship game. Boone was part of an offensive line that allowed just 12 sacks in the regular season and helped the Buckeyes average 229.7 yards passing per game and ran for 180.1 yards per game for an average of 409.8 total yards per game. He was named team's offensive lineman of the game against Penn State in Week 4. The Buckeyes' offense racked up a season-high 540 yards against Indiana and 503 yards against Michigan while also bettering 400 yards or more eight times.

=== Junior season (2007) ===
In his third-year as a starter at the left tackle position, Boone was named a second-team All-Big Ten by the media, coaches and Rivals. He was named offensive player of week following his performance in the game against Purdue in week 6. He was also named Jim Parker offensive lineman of the week for the Northwestern (week 4) and Penn State (week 9) games.

=== Senior season (2008) ===
As a senior in 2008, Boone was named first-team All-Big Ten and second-team Walter Camp Football Foundation All-America. In week 7, he suffered a stinger in the Purdue game. He was named Jim Parker offensive lineman of the week for the Youngstown State, Ohio, Wisconsin, Michigan State, Penn State and Illinois games. He was also recipient of the Jim Parker Award from Ohio State coaches. Following his senior season, Boone was invited to play in the East-West Shrine Game.

== Professional career ==
External videos
- Alex Boone Combine Interview

Pre-draft measurables
Height	Weight	Arm length	Hand span	40-yard dash	10-yard split	20-yard split	20-yard shuttle	Three-cone drill	Vertical jump	Broad jump	Bench press
6 ft 7 1/4 in (2.01 m)	328 lb (149 kg)	34 3/8 in (0.87 m)	9 7/8 in (0.25 m)	5.23 s	1.90 s	3.11 s	4.69 s	7.83 s	27.5 in (0.70 m)	8 ft 7 in (2.62 m)	33 reps
All values from NFL Combine

=== San Francisco 49ers ===
Boone went undrafted in the 2009 NFL draft, at least partially due to concerns about alcohol abuse.

Boone played under head coach Jim Harbaugh during his tenure with the 49ers. When rumors of dysfunction in the locker room were spreading in 2014 during Harbaugh's last year with the 49ers, Boone was one of his biggest supporters. However, that all changed once his coach had moved to Michigan. He was seen on HBO's "Real Sports" saying that Harbaugh "wore out his welcome" and that he might be "clinically insane".

==== 2009 season ====
After being signed by the San Francisco 49ers as an undrafted free agent following the 2009 NFL Draft, Boone was released on the final day of roster cuts. He was subsequently signed to the practice squad. On January 6, 2010, he was signed to the active roster and spent the entire season on the 49ers practice squad.

==== 2010 season ====
In the offseason following his rookie season, Boone returned home to Lakewood, Ohio, where he began working out with former NFL Pro Bowl center LeCharles Bentley. With Bentley's help and guidance, Boone returned for training in the best shape of his life. He dropped 40 pounds of fat before putting 25 pounds of muscle back on. Boone was inactive from Weeks 1–16. In Week 17, Boone made his NFL debut against the Arizona Cardinals on January 2, 2011, entering the game at left tackle in the second half.

==== 2011 season ====
In his third season with the 49ers, Boone entered each game in short-yardage situations and contributed on special teams. Boone and the offensive line were awarded the Madden Most Valuable Protectors Award for Week 5 as they helped the 49ers offense rush for 213 yards on the ground while not allowing a sack in the 49ers win over the Tampa Bay Buccaneers. He supported the 49ers offense in rushing for 203 yards against the Detroit Lions in Week 6, marking the first time the team had rushed for over 200 yards in back-to-back games since 1998 at Carolina and versus Detroit. In Week 11 against the Arizona Cardinals, he contributed on the offensive line, helping the 49ers offense hold the ball for 44:16 minutes while not allowing a sack, marking the highest time of possession for the team since the 2002 season at Oakland. During the game, he replaced Joe Staley at left tackle after he was sidelined with a head injury. In Week 15, Boone and the offensive line prevented quarterback Alex Smith from getting sacked in a 20–3 win on Monday Night Football (MNF) against the Pittsburgh Steelers.

==== 2012 season ====
In the 2012 season, Boone exceeded expectations by becoming a starter, and by performing at or near Pro Bowl caliber levels. One journalist called Boone one of the most underpaid players in the NFL. Boone and the whole 49ers offensive line won the 2012 Madden Most Valuable Protectors of the Year Award, recognizing the best offensive line in the league. In Week 1, Boone made his first career NFL start against the Green Bay Packers, lining up at right guard and helping running back Frank Gore rush for 112 yards. In Week 4, he paved the way as the team rushed for 245 yards on 44 carries as nine different players carried the ball against the New York Jets. In the 49ers blowout win over the Buffalo Bills the following week, he helped the offense set a team record with 621 total yards (311 rushing, 310 passing), surpassing the 49ers previous franchise record of 598 against Buffalo set on September 13, 1992. It also marked the first time in 49ers history since November 19, 1961 against Chicago that San Francisco posted a 300-yard passer (quarterback Alex Smith 303 yds.), two 100-yard receivers (wide receiver Michael Crabtree, with 113 yards; tight end Vernon Davis. with 106) and a 100-yard rusher (running back Frank Gore with 106 yards) in the same game. Also, the offensive line did not allow a sack the entire game and was awarded the Madden Most Valuable Protectors Award for Week 5. Two weeks later, he helped Frank Gore record his 32nd career 100-yard game with 131 on 16 carries (8.2 avg.) against the Seattle Seahawks. Boone and the 49ers offensive line did not allow a sack on 25 pass attempts by rookie quarterback Colin Kaepernick in the victory against the New Orleans Saints on November 25. During the game, he was kicked in the back of the head by the Saints' defensive tackle Brodrick Bunkley. Bunkley was ejected from the game because of that kick. The performance earned the O-Line the Madden Most Valuable Protectors Award for Week 12.

In the postseason, Boone was part of the offensive line in the NFC Divisional game against the Green Bay Packers that helped the 49ers become the first-team in NFL history to have two 100-yard rushers in quarterback Colin Kaepernick (181 yards) and veteran running back Frank Gore (119 yards) and one 100-yard receiver in wideout Michael Crabtree (119 yards) in a playoff game in NFL history. Against the Packers, San Francisco amassed 579 total yards of offense (323 rushing and 256 passing), setting a new single-game postseason franchise record. Boone and the 49ers offense became the first-team in Super Bowl history to have a 300-yard passer, a 100-yard rusher and two 100-yard receivers in a single game. Colin Kaepernick threw for 302 yards, Frank Gore added 110 yards on the ground, Michael Crabtree tallied 109 receiving yards and Vernon Davis recorded 104 yards.

==== 2013 season ====
Before the 2013 season, Jeff Deeney of Pro Football Focus (PFF) named Boone the 49ers' secret superstar for his performance in 2012. Deeney stated: "Boone was a force in the running game as his +18.6 run blocking grade was best among all right guards. He also ranked second among all guards by receiving a negative grade on only 4.7% of his run blocks. Boone also held his own in the passing game as he earned a +2.1 rating during the regular season, and his 20 QB pressures allowed tied him for 17th lowest out of 50 guards who played at least 400 passing snaps."

Coming off a solid 2012 season, Boone bulked up to 315 pounds to prepare for a breakout season. In the season opener against the Green Bay Packers, he was part of an offensive line that helped amass the second most total net yards on opening day in 49ers franchise history with 494 yards (404 passing and 90 rushing). On September 13, 2013, Boone expressed displeasure with an illegal and fine-inducing hit performed by Packers linebacker Clay Matthews III on Colin Kaepernick, stating that if he was in charge of punitive actions he would not fine Matthews, but instead "probably punch Matthews in the face". In Week 4, he helped pave the way for 219 yards rushing in the victory at St Louis, which marked the first time the 49ers had three different running backs score a rushing touchdown in the same game since December 2, 2001 against Buffalo. The offensive line did not allow a sack on 17 total attempts by quarterbacks Colin Kaepernick and Colt McCoy in the win over the Jacksonville Jaguars in Week 8. The 49ers also rushed for 221 yards and 4 touchdowns on 38 carries against the Jaguars, the most rushing yards in a game by the team during the 2013 season. In Week 16 against the Atlanta Falcons, he provided great running lanes for the offense to gain 199 rushing yards on 30 attempts. The 6.6 yards per carry average was the team's highest in any game during the 2013 season and also marked just the second time in the season that the team had three players rush for over 50 yds.

==== 2014 season ====
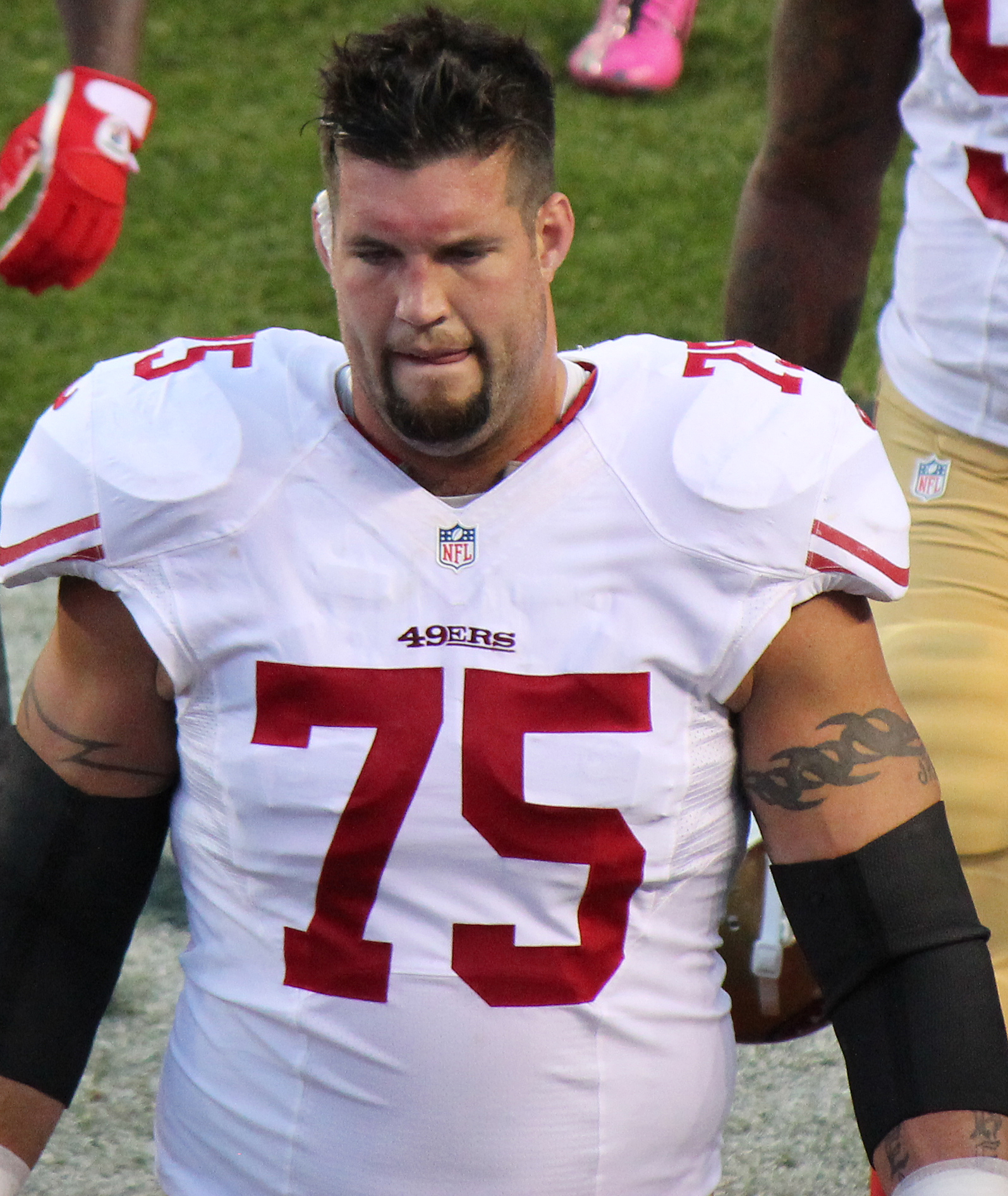
Boone with the San Francisco 49ers in 2014.

Boone held out of 49ers' 2014 training camp in hopes of getting a new contract. He ended his hold-out on September 1, 2014, after reworking the last two years of his contract. His new contract increased his total pay for 2014 and 2015 from a combined $3.7 million to $6 million, as well as, prevented the 49ers from franchising him after deal is completed.

He helped pave the way for the 49ers offense to rush for a season high 218 yards on 42 attempts with 5.2 avg. against the Philadelphia Eagles on September 28. He also helped the 49ers offense hold the ball for 42:17 minutes, which was the highest time of possession for the team since the 2011 season against Arizona (44:16). In Week 6, he was part of an offensive line that held the Rams pass rush without a sack, leading to quarterback Colin Kaepernick passing for a season-high 343 yards. In Week 16, he contributed as part of an offensive line that led the way for the team to rush for a franchise record 355 yards against the San Diego Chargers. The 355 rushing yards were the most by any team in the NFL since the 2007 season when the Minnesota Vikings rushed for 378 yards against San Diego.

==== 2015 season ====
In Week 1, Boone was part of an offensive line group that helped the team rush for 230 total yards against the Minnesota Vikings, the most in franchise history during a season opening game. The offensive line helped pave the way for second-year running back Carlos Hyde as he rushed for an NFL Week 1-high of 168 yards and 2 touchdowns. In Week 9, Boone and the 49ers offensive line did not allow a sack on 25 attempts by quarterback Blaine Gabbert against the Atlanta Falcons, and he helped pave the way for 133 yards rushing. On December 26, 2015, Boone was placed on injured reserve with a knee injury, ending his season.

=== Minnesota Vikings ===
==== 2016 season ====
On March 9, 2016, Boone signed a four-year $26.8 million contract with the Minnesota Vikings.

He was named the starting left guard to begin the season and started 14 games for the Vikings.

==== 2017 season ====
Following Matt Kalil's departure to the Carolina Panthers, the Vikings announced on Twitter that Boone will switch from No. 76 to No. 75, the number he wore during his entire football career, including in high school.

On September 2, 2017, Boone was released by the Vikings after refusing to take a pay cut.

=== Arizona Cardinals ===
On September 5, 2017, Boone signed with the Arizona Cardinals. He started 13 games at left guard for the Cardinals in 2017.

After expressing interest in a comeback to the NFL, Boone had a workout with the Baltimore Ravens on December 11, 2020.

=== Seattle Seahawks ===
On December 23, 2020, Boone signed with the practice squad of the Seattle Seahawks. He was elevated to the active roster on January 2, 2021, for the team's week 17 game against the San Francisco 49ers, and reverted to the practice squad after the game. His practice squad contract with the team expired after the season on January 18, 2021.

== After football ==
Boone began coaching various pee wee football teams as well as running a yearly Offensive Line gym. He makes regular appearances on SKOR North in a weekly show called "The O-Line Committee" where Phil Mackey, Jeremiah Sirles and Boone discuss the previous week of football, and do film breakdown of the previous week’s NFL games with an emphasis on O-Line play.

== Personal life ==
Boone was convicted of driving under the influence in 2006 and was arrested on February 1, 2009, after allegedly jumping on car hoods, yanking on a tow truck cable and trying to break a window.
