= Rick Razzano (linebacker) =

American gridiron football player (born 1955)

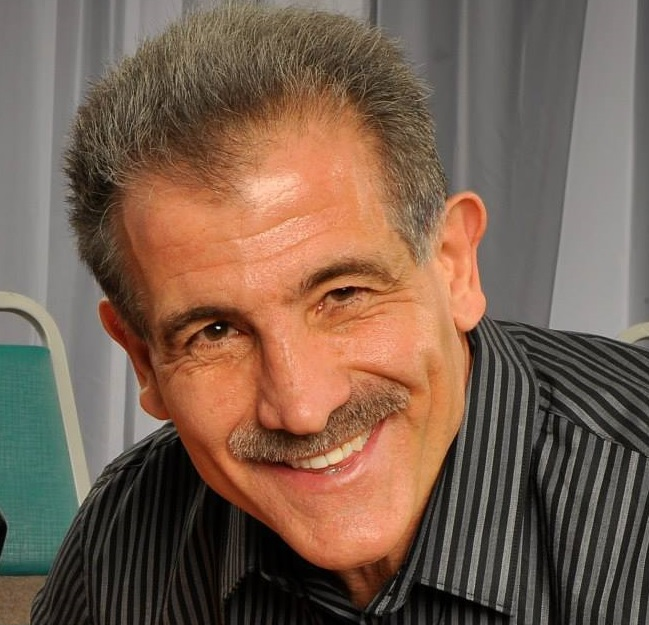
- Razzano in 2015

No. 51
- Position: Linebacker

Personal information
- Born: November 15, 1955 (age 70); New Castle, Pennsylvania, U.S.
- Listed height: 5 ft 11 in (1.80 m)
- Listed weight: 231 lb (105 kg)

Career information
- High school: New Castle
- College: Virginia Tech
- NFL draft: 1978: undrafted

Career history

Playing
- Toronto Argonauts (1978–1979); Cincinnati Bengals (1980–1984)

Coaching
- Milford Eagles (1996–2006) Defensive coordinator; Sycamore Aviators (2006–2010) Linebackers coach; New Castle Thunder (2006–2007) Head coach
- Stats at Pro Football Reference

Richard Anthony Razzano (born November 15, 1955) is an American former professional football linebacker who played five seasons with the Cincinnati Bengals of the National Football League (NFL). He played college football at Virginia Tech. He was also a member of the Toronto Argonauts of the Canadian Football League (CFL).

== Early life ==
Razzano played high school football at New Castle High School in New Castle, Pennsylvania. He was named the WPIAL's Most Valuable Player in 1973 as the Hurricanes won the WPIAL Class AAA championship.

== College career ==
Razzano played for the Virginia Tech Hokies from 1974 to 1977. He earned First Team All-South honors in 1976 and 1977. He set school records for most tackles in a game with 30 in 1977, most tackles in a season with 177 in 1975 and 1st in all time career tackles with 634 (3rd in NCAA history). Razzano was inducted into the Virginia Tech Sports Hall of Fame in 1997.

== Professional career ==
Razzano played in 23 games for the Toronto Argonauts from 1978 to 1979. He played in 65 games, starting ten, for the Cincinnati Bengals from 1980 to 1984. He played an important role in the 1981 AFC Championship Game, where he forced a fumble on a kickoff return in the first quarter with Cincinnati up 3–0. Cincinnati scored a quick touchdown and rolled to a 27–7 victory. Razzano played in the Bengals’ loss in Super Bowl XVI and recorded three solo tackles.

== Personal life ==
Razzano's son Rick Razzano, Jr. started 3 years as a fullback for Ole Miss and also played in the National Football League for the Tampa Bay Buccaneers while his son Joey, a one time Virginia Tech commit played for the Kentucky Wildcats. Rick lives in Sarasota, Florida with his wife, Jill Razzano. He ran a wholesale ice cream distribution business for sixteen years. He has also worked as an education assistant at Sycamore High School in Cincinnati, Ohio and Sycamore Junior High School in Montgomery, Ohio.

== Coaching career ==
Razzano had a ten-year stint as defensive coordinator of the Milford High School Eagles of Milford, Ohio. He later served as linebackers coach of the Sycamore High School Aviators of Cincinnati, Ohio from 2006 to 2010. He has also been basketball coach at Sycamore Junior High School in Montgomery, Ohio. Razzano was head coach of the semi-pro New Castle Thunder of New Castle, Pennsylvania from 2006 to 2007.
