= Jonathan Goodwin (American football) =

American football player (born 1978)

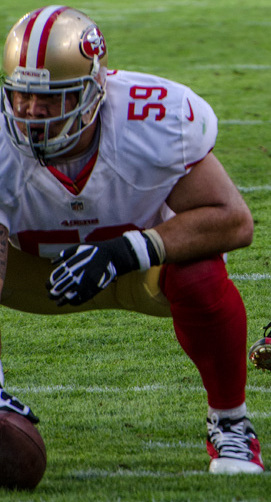
- Goodwin with the San Francisco 49ers in 2012

Carolina Panthers
- Title: Coaching intern

Personal information
- Born: December 2, 1978 (age 47); Columbia, South Carolina, U.S.
- Listed height: 6 ft 4 in (1.93 m)
- Listed weight: 318 lb (144 kg)

Career information
- High school: Lower Richland (Hopkins, South Carolina)
- College: Ohio (1997); Michigan (1998–2001)
- NFL draft: 2002: 5th round, 154th overall pick

Career history

Playing
- New York Jets (2002–2005); New Orleans Saints (2006–2010); San Francisco 49ers (2011–2013); New Orleans Saints (2014)

Coaching
- Los Angeles Chargers (2024) Offensive assistant; Carolina Panthers (2025–present) Coaching intern

Awards and highlights
- Super Bowl champion (XLIV); Pro Bowl (2009); 2× Madden Most Valuable Protectors Award (2009, 2012); Second-team All-American (2001); First-team All-Big Ten (2001)

Career NFL statistics
- Games played: 195
- Games started: 122
- Fumble recoveries: 3
- Stats at Pro Football Reference

Jonathan Scott Goodwin (born December 2, 1978) is an American former professional football player who was a center in the National Football League (NFL) and current coach for the Los Angeles Chargers. He played college football for the Michigan Wolverines and was selected by the New York Jets in the fifth round of the 2002 NFL draft. Goodwin also played for the New Orleans Saints and the San Francisco 49ers.

== Early life ==
Goodwin was born in Columbia, South Carolina. He attended Lower Richland High School in Hopkins, South Carolina and was a student and a letterman in football. In football, he was an all-conference selection.

== College career ==
Goodwin enrolled in the University of Michigan, and played for the Michigan Wolverines football team from 1998 to 2001. Transferred to University of Michigan from Ohio University after freshman season.

== Professional career ==
=== New York Jets ===
Goodwin was selected in the fifth round, 154th overall in the 2002 NFL draft by the New York Jets.

=== New Orleans Saints (first stint) ===
After the 2005 season, Goodwin was a free agent, and signed with the New Orleans Saints. He was the Saints' starting center during their 2009 Super Bowl season and made the Pro Bowl as a reserve in 2010.

=== San Francisco 49ers ===
On August 3, 2011, Goodwin signed with the San Francisco 49ers as an unrestricted free agent. He started all 16 games during the season. Goodwin also participated on the postseason roster when meeting his former team in the 2011 Divisional Round, the Saints. The 49ers defeated the Saints in the divisional round. The 49ers would eventually lose the 2011 NFC Championship to the Giants in overtime.

Goodwin received the Bobb McKittrick Award which is given annually to the 49ers offensive lineman who best represents the courage, intensity and sacrifice displayed by the longtime offensive line coach who spent 21 years with the 49ers. The award was established by the 49ers in 1999, and is voted on by the offensive line.

At the end of the 2012 season, Goodwin and the 49ers appeared in Super Bowl XLVII. He started in the game, but the 49ers fell to the Baltimore Ravens by a score of 34–31.

Goodwin started every game at center during his three years with the 49ers.

=== New Orleans Saints (second stint) ===
On June 3, 2014, Goodwin returned to New Orleans, signing a one-year contract. He was named starting center ahead of second-year center Tim Lelito. In the Week 3 win against the Minnesota Vikings, he left the game during the third quarter due to an ankle sprain.

== Personal life ==
Goodwin's older brother, Harold, is the run game coordinator and assistant head coach for the Carolina Panthers.
