= 2010 Pro Bowl =

National Football League all-star game

2010 NFL Pro Bowl
AFC	NFC
41	34
Head coach: Norv Turner (San Diego Chargers)	Head coach: Wade Phillips (Dallas Cowboys)
	1	2	3	4	Total
AFC	14	3	17	7	41
NFC	10	7	14	3	34
- Date: January 31, 2010
- Stadium: Sun Life Stadium; Miami Gardens, Florida
- MVP: Matt Schaub (Houston Texans)
- Referee: Jeff Triplette
- Attendance: 70,697

Ceremonies
- National anthem: Honor Society
- Coin toss: Don Shula

TV in the United States
- Network: ESPN
- Announcers: Mike Tirico, Ron Jaworski, Jon Gruden, Michele Tafoya, and Suzy Kolber

The 2010 Pro Bowl was the National Football League's all-star game for the 2009 season. It took place at 8:00 PM EST on Sunday, January 31, 2010, at Sun Life Stadium in Miami Gardens, Florida, the home stadium of the Miami Dolphins and host site of Super Bowl XLIV. It was the first time that the Pro Bowl was played on the weekend before the Super Bowl. The AFC won the game 41–34.

== Site and date changes ==
The 2010 Pro Bowl was held on the weekend before the Super Bowl, the first time ever that the Pro Bowl was held before the championship game, and the first time that the Pro Bowl was held somewhere other than Aloha Stadium in Honolulu since 1980 (1979 season). NFL Commissioner Roger Goodell said the move was made after looking at alternatives to strengthen the Pro Bowl.

The game was moved up in order to prevent a conflict that would have taken place if the game had taken place on February 13 or 14, with the game facing against the NBA All-Star Game, Winter Olympics, and Daytona 500. Due to the change, players from the conference championship teams, who were going to play in the Super Bowl the following week—the Indianapolis Colts and New Orleans Saints—did not participate. As a result, for the first time in Pro Bowl history, rosters for the AFC and NFC teams were not allowed to include any players from the teams that would be playing in the Super Bowl to avoid major injuries to members of either team. However, these players were still required to be on site for the Pro Bowl to collect a bonus payment from the NFL.

Several NFL players spoke out against the decision regarding timing of the game; ten-time Pro Bowl quarterback Peyton Manning raised issue with the possibility that if the concept of rotating the location of the game were to continue, the 2012 game could be held in a cold-weather city (Indianapolis) not seen as a winter vacation destination. NBC sportscaster Al Michaels was skeptical of the changes, telling the Honolulu Star-Bulletin that "the [NFL] thinks playing it before the Super Bowl will add to the buzz. It won't." Indianapolis Colts president Bill Polian also came out against the change, explaining that it seemed disruptive and "stupid" to have players voted to the Pro Bowl, only to have to sit out because they're playing in the Super Bowl, but still have to show up to the game to collect a bonus payment.

== Broadcasting ==
ESPN aired the game instead of CBS, which aired the 52nd Grammy Awards that evening. Play-by-play announcer Mike Tirico and analysts Ron Jaworski and Jon Gruden called the game.

The game was the first Pro Bowl to be legally broadcast on internet radio. As part of a catch in the league's broadcast contracts, the Pro Bowl has, to this point, never been broadcast on the NFL's FieldPass system due to it being broadcast exclusively by Westwood One. The NFL had negotiated internet broadcast rights with all 32 of its teams, but never did so with Westwood One (since it was seen as redundant); since none of the 32 teams actually play in the Pro Bowl, FieldPass did not hold rights. When contracts were renegotiated in 2009, Westwood One's broadcasts were added to FieldPass, and along with it, play-by-play of the Pro Bowl. The Sports USA Radio Network provided the commentary for Westwood One, with SUSA's Larry Kahn on play-by-play and Dan Fouts sharing color commentary with Westwood One's Boomer Esiason.

== Scoring summary ==
Scoring Play	Score
1st Quarter
AFC – Andre Johnson 33-yard pass from Matt Schaub (Dan Carpenter kick), 12:00	AFC 7–0
NFC – David Akers 47-yard field goal, 9:29	AFC 7–3
AFC – Brandon Marshall 23-yard pass from Matt Schaub (Dan Carpenter kick), 7:07	AFC 14–3
NFC – Steve Smith 48-yard pass from Aaron Rodgers (David Akers kick), 3:37	AFC 14–10
2nd Quarter
NFC – DeSean Jackson 7-yard pass from Aaron Rodgers (David Akers kick), 11:31	NFC 17–14
AFC – Dan Carpenter 30-yard field goal, 5:31	17–17
3rd Quarter
NFC – DeSean Jackson 58-yard pass from Donovan McNabb (David Akers kick), 14:22	NFC 24–17
AFC – Vincent Jackson 48-yard pass from David Garrard (Dan Carpenter kick), 13:33	24–24
AFC – Maurice Jones-Drew 4-yard run (Dan Carpenter kick), 11:27	AFC 31–24
AFC – Dan Carpenter 26-yard field goal, 5:13	AFC 34–24
NFC – DeAngelo Williams 7-yard run (David Akers kick), 1:27	AFC 34–31
4th Quarter
NFC – David Akers 39-yard field goal, 11:48	34–34
AFC – Chris Johnson 2-yard run (Dan Carpenter kick), 6:03	AFC 41–34

== AFC roster ==
=== Offense ===
Position:	Starter(s):	Reserve(s):	Alternate(s):
Quarterback	18 Peyton Manning, Indianapolis^{[e]}	17 Philip Rivers, San Diego^{[b]} 12 Tom Brady, New England^{[b]}	8 Matt Schaub, Houston^{[a]}^{[c]}^{[g]} 10 Vince Young, Tennessee^{[a]}^{[h]} 9 David Garrard, Jacksonville^{[a]}
Running back	28 Chris Johnson, Tennessee	32 Maurice Jones-Drew, Jacksonville; 27 Ray Rice, Baltimore	
Fullback	33 Le'Ron McClain, Baltimore		
Wide receiver	80 Andre Johnson, Houston; 87 Reggie Wayne, Indianapolis^{[e]}	15 Brandon Marshall, Denver^{[c]} 83 Wes Welker, New England^{[b]}	85 Chad Ochocinco, Cincinnati^{[a]} 83 Vincent Jackson, San Diego^{[a]}
Tight end	44 Dallas Clark, Indianapolis^{[e]}	85 Antonio Gates, San Diego^{[c]}	83 Heath Miller, Pittsburgh^{[a]}
Offensive tackle	77 Jake Long, Miami^{[b]} 78 Ryan Clady, Denver	73 Joe Thomas, Cleveland^{[c]}	60 D'Brickashaw Ferguson, N.Y. Jets^{[a]}
Offensive guard	70 Logan Mankins, New England; 66 Alan Faneca, N.Y. Jets	68 Kris Dielman, San Diego	
Center	74 Nick Mangold, N.Y. Jets	63 Jeff Saturday, Indianapolis^{[e]}	68 Kevin Mawae, Tennessee^{[a]}

=== Defense ===
Position:	Starter(s):	Reserve(s):	Alternate(s):
Defensive end	93 Dwight Freeney, Indianapolis^{[e]} 98 Robert Mathis, Indianapolis^{[e]}	90 Mario Williams, Houston^{[c]}	93 Kyle Vanden Bosch, Tennessee^{[a]}^{[c]} 92 Shaun Ellis, N.Y. Jets^{[a]}
Defensive tackle	92 Haloti Ngata, Baltimore; 75 Vince Wilfork, New England	98 Casey Hampton, Pittsburgh	
Outside linebacker	92 Elvis Dumervil, Denver; 92 James Harrison, Pittsburgh	56 Brian Cushing, Houston^{[b]}	56 LaMarr Woodley, Pittsburgh^{[a]}
Inside linebacker	52 Ray Lewis, Baltimore	59 DeMeco Ryans, Houston	
Cornerback	24 Darrelle Revis, N.Y. Jets; 21 Nnamdi Asomugha, Oakland	24 Champ Bailey, Denver	
Free safety	20 Ed Reed, Baltimore^{[b]}	31 Jairus Byrd, Buffalo^{[b]}	31 Brandon Meriweather, New England^{[a]}^{[c]} 41 Antoine Bethea, Indianapolis^{[a]}^{[e]}
Strong safety	20 Brian Dawkins, Denver		37 Yeremiah Bell, Miami^{[a]}

=== Special teams ===
Position:	Starter(s):	Reserve(s):	Alternate(s):
Punter	9 Shane Lechler, Oakland		
Placekicker	10 Nate Kaeding, San Diego^{[b]}		5 Dan Carpenter, Miami^{[a]}
Kick returner	16 Joshua Cribbs, Cleveland		
Special teamer	81 Kassim Osgood, San Diego		
Long snapper	59 Jon Condo, Oakland^{[d]}		

== NFC roster ==
=== Offense ===
Position:	Starter(s):	Reserve(s):	Alternate(s):
Quarterback	9 Drew Brees, New Orleans^{[e]}	4 Brett Favre, Minnesota^{[b]} **12 Aaron Rodgers, Green Bay^{[c]}**	**5 Donovan McNabb, Philadelphia^{[a]}** **9 Tony Romo, Dallas^{[a]}**
Running back	**28 Adrian Peterson, Minnesota**	39 Steven Jackson, St. Louis^{[b]} **34 DeAngelo Williams, Carolina**	**21 Frank Gore, San Francisco^{[a]}**
Fullback	**43 Leonard Weaver, Philadelphia^{[b]}**		**30 John Kuhn, Green Bay^{[a]}**
Wide receiver	11 Larry Fitzgerald, Arizona^{[b]} **10 DeSean Jackson, Philadelphia^{[f]}**	18 Sidney Rice, Minnesota^{[b]} **19 Miles Austin, Dallas^{[c]}**	**12 Steve Smith, N.Y. Giants^{[a]}** **84 Roddy White, Atlanta^{[a]}**
Tight end	**85 Vernon Davis, San Francisco**	**82 Jason Witten, Dallas**	
Offensive tackle	**71 Jason Peters, Philadelphia**; 74 Bryant McKinnie, Minnesota^{[j]}	78 Jon Stinchcomb, New Orleans^{[e]}	**66 David Diehl N.Y. Giants^{[a]}^{[c]}**
Offensive guard	**76 Steve Hutchinson, Minnesota**; 73 Jahri Evans, New Orleans^{[e]}	**70 Leonard Davis, Dallas^{[c]}**	**76 Chris Snee N.Y. Giants^{[a]}**
Center	65 Andre Gurode, Dallas^{[b]}	**60 Shaun O'Hara, N.Y. Giants^{[c]}**	76 Jonathan Goodwin, New Orleans^{[a]}^{[e]} **67 Ryan Kalil, Carolina^{[a]}**

=== Defense ===
Position:	Starter(s):	Reserve(s):	Alternate(s):
Defensive end	**69 Jared Allen, Minnesota**; **90 Julius Peppers, Carolina**	**58 Trent Cole, Philadelphia**	
Defensive tackle	93 Kevin Williams, Minnesota^{[b]} **90 Darnell Dockett, Arizona**	**90 Jay Ratliff, Dallas^{[c]}**	**94 Justin Smith, San Francisco^{[a]}**
Outside linebacker	**94 DeMarcus Ware, Dallas**; 55 Lance Briggs, Chicago^{[b]}	**98 Brian Orakpo, Washington^{[c]}**	**52 Clay Matthews, Green Bay^{[a]}**
Inside linebacker	52 Patrick Willis, San Francisco^{[b]}	51 Jonathan Vilma, New Orleans^{[e]}	**59 London Fletcher, Washington^{[a]}^{[c]}** **52 Jon Beason, Carolina^{[a]}**
Cornerback	21 Charles Woodson, Green Bay^{[b]} **22 Asante Samuel, Philadelphia**	29 Dominique Rodgers-Cromartie, Arizona^{[b]}	26 Antoine Winfield, Minnesota^{[a]}^{[b]} **41 Terence Newman, Dallas^{[a]}^{[c]}^{[i]}** **21 Mike Jenkins, Dallas^{[a]}**
Free safety	42 Darren Sharper, New Orleans^{[e]}	**36 Nick Collins, Green Bay^{[c]}**	**21 Antrel Rolle, Arizona^{[a]}**
Strong safety	24 Adrian Wilson, Arizona^{[b]}		41 Roman Harper, New Orleans^{[a]}^{[e]} **27 Quintin Mikell, Philadelphia^{[a]}^{[c]}**

=== Special teams ===
Position:	Starter(s):	Reserve(s):	Alternate(s):
Punter	**4 Andy Lee, San Francisco**		
Placekicker	**2 David Akers, Philadelphia**		
Kick returner	**10 DeSean Jackson, Philadelphia^{[f]}**		12 Percy Harvin, Minnesota^{[a]}^{[b]} **13 Johnny Knox, Chicago^{[a]}**
Special teamer	**59 Heath Farwell, Minnesota**		
Long snapper	**46 Jon Dorenbos, Philadelphia^{[d]}**		

Notes:

bold denotes player who participated in game
^{a} Replacement selection due to injury or vacancy
^{b} Injured player; selected but did not play
^{c} Replacement starter; selected as reserve
^{d} "Need player"; named by coach
^{e} Selected but did not play since his team advanced to Super Bowl XLIV
^{f} Jackson was selected at both wide receiver and kick returner; he was replaced at kick returner by Percy Harvin
^{g} Ben Roethlisberger was the first alternate, but declined due to injury
^{h} Carson Palmer was the third alternate, but declined due to injury
^{i} Sheldon Brown was the second alternate, but declined citing personal reasons
^{j} McKinnie did not play in the Pro Bowl due to unexplained absences from practices
^{k} Randy Moss was the first AFC alternate, but did not play citing injury and was replaced.

== Number of selections per team ==
AFC team	Selections	NFC team	Selections
Indianapolis Colts	7	Minnesota Vikings	10
New England Patriots	6	Dallas Cowboys	9
San Diego Chargers	6	Philadelphia Eagles	9
Baltimore Ravens	5	New Orleans Saints	7
Denver Broncos	5	Arizona Cardinals	5
Houston Texans	5	San Francisco 49ers	5
New York Jets	5	Carolina Panthers	4
Pittsburgh Steelers	4	Green Bay Packers	4
Tennessee Titans	4	New York Giants	4
Miami Dolphins	3	Chicago Bears	2
Oakland Raiders	3	Washington Redskins	2
Cleveland Browns	2	Atlanta Falcons	1
Jacksonville Jaguars	2	St. Louis Rams	1
Buffalo Bills	1	Detroit Lions	0
Cincinnati Bengals	1	Seattle Seahawks	0
Kansas City Chiefs	0	Tampa Bay Buccaneers	0
