= Jon Stinchcomb =

American football player (born 1979)

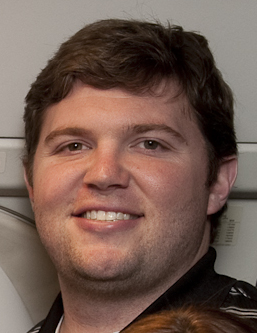
- Stinchcomb in 2010

No. 78
- Position: Offensive tackle

Personal information
- Born: August 27, 1979 (age 47); Atlanta, Georgia, U.S.
- Listed height: 6 ft 5 in (1.96 m)
- Listed weight: 315 lb (143 kg)

Career information
- High school: Parkview (Lilburn, Georgia)
- College: Georgia
- NFL draft: 2003: 2nd round, 37th overall pick

Career history
- New Orleans Saints (2003–2010)

Awards and highlights
- Super Bowl champion (XLIV); Pro Bowl (2009); Madden Most Valuable Protectors Award (2009); First-team All-American (2002); Second-team All-American (2001); 2× First-team All-SEC (2001, 2002)

Career NFL statistics
- Games played: 90
- Games started: 80
- Fumble recoveries: 3
- Stats at Pro Football Reference

Jonathan Stinchcomb (born August 27, 1979) is an American former professional football player who was an offensive tackle for the New Orleans Saints of the National Football League (NFL). He played college football for the Georgia Bulldogs. He was selected in the second round of the 2003 NFL draft by Saints, and was a member of their Super Bowl XLIV championship team, which beat the Indianapolis Colts.

== College career ==
Stinchcomb attended the University of Georgia, where he played for the Georgia Bulldogs football team from 1998 to 2002. Four-year starter at Georgia…All-Academic honors in 2001-02…One of 11 players to earn AFCA Good Works Team honors for contributions to community service…In 2002 named a Walter Camp All-American, All-SEC and one of six recipients of National Football Foundation scholarship. Stinchcomb was inducted into the University of Georgia’s Circle of Honor in 2012.

== Professional career ==
Pre-draft measurables
Height	Weight	Arm length	Hand span	40-yard dash	10-yard split	20-yard split	20-yard shuttle	Three-cone drill	Vertical jump	Broad jump	Bench press
6 ft 5 in (1.96 m)	302 lb (137 kg)	32 1/2 in (0.83 m)	9 3/4 in (0.25 m)	5.06 s	1.75 s	2.90 s	4.62 s	7.83 s	35 in (0.89 m)	9 ft 7 in (2.92 m)	32 reps
All values from NFL Combine.

After spending his first two years with the Saints as a backup, Stinchcomb missed the entire 2005 season with a knee injury, then took over the starting right tackle position for the Saints in 2006. He started 86 consecutive games for the Saints over five seasons, was named the team's Man of the Year in 2008, and went to the Pro Bowl in the Saints' Super Bowl-winning 2009 season. He was released on August 15, 2011, after the Saints' first exhibition game of the 2011 season. On September 22, 2011, he told a New Orleans radio interviewer that he had decided to retire, with plans to pursue a career in physical therapy.

== Personal life ==
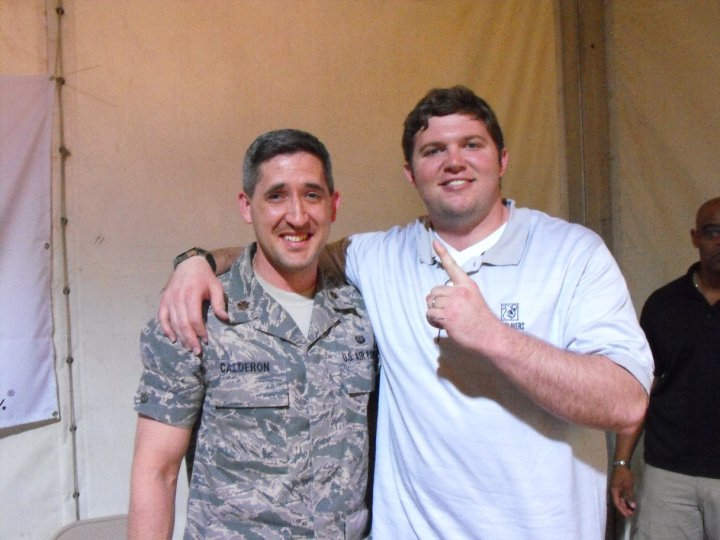
Stinchcomb visits a member of the U.S. Air Force during a USO visit to Southwest Asia.

He is the younger brother of Matt Stinchcomb, a former offensive tackle for the Oakland Raiders and Tampa Bay Buccaneers. He attended Parkview High School in Lilburn, Georgia, where he was a USA Today and Parade All-American.

Stinchcomb is a Christian. Stinchcomb has spoken about his faith saying, "There's a victory that every man can have. And that's an eternity and salvation and that comes through Jesus. So it gives you that solace that you can go out there and you play your heart out and give it all you have. And at end of the day you'll be a winner no matter what." He is the director of operations for a Gwinnett County, Georgia based organization called NG# (Next Generation 3), which promotes the development of character building and chaplaincy programs in local schools.

On August 9, 2013, Stinchcomb began a stint as television analyst for the Saints' 2013 preseason games, together with Tim Brando.
