= Rick Razzano (running back) =

American football player (born 1981)

No. 44
- Position: Fullback

Personal information
- Born: January 28, 1981 (age 45); Milford, Ohio, U.S.

Career information
- College: Mississippi
- NFL draft: 2005: 7th round, 221st overall pick

Career history
- 2005–2006: Tampa Bay Buccaneers

Richard Anthony Razzano (born January 28, 1981) is an American former professional football player who was a fullback in the National Football League (NFL). He was selected by the Tampa Bay Buccaneers in the seventh round of the 2005 NFL draft with the 221st overall pick.

Razzano played college football for the Ole Miss Rebels. His father, Rick Razzano, also played in the NFL.

Razzano has owned and operated a gym called Pain Train Fitness since 2008.
