= Tom Brady =

American football player and commentator (born 1977)

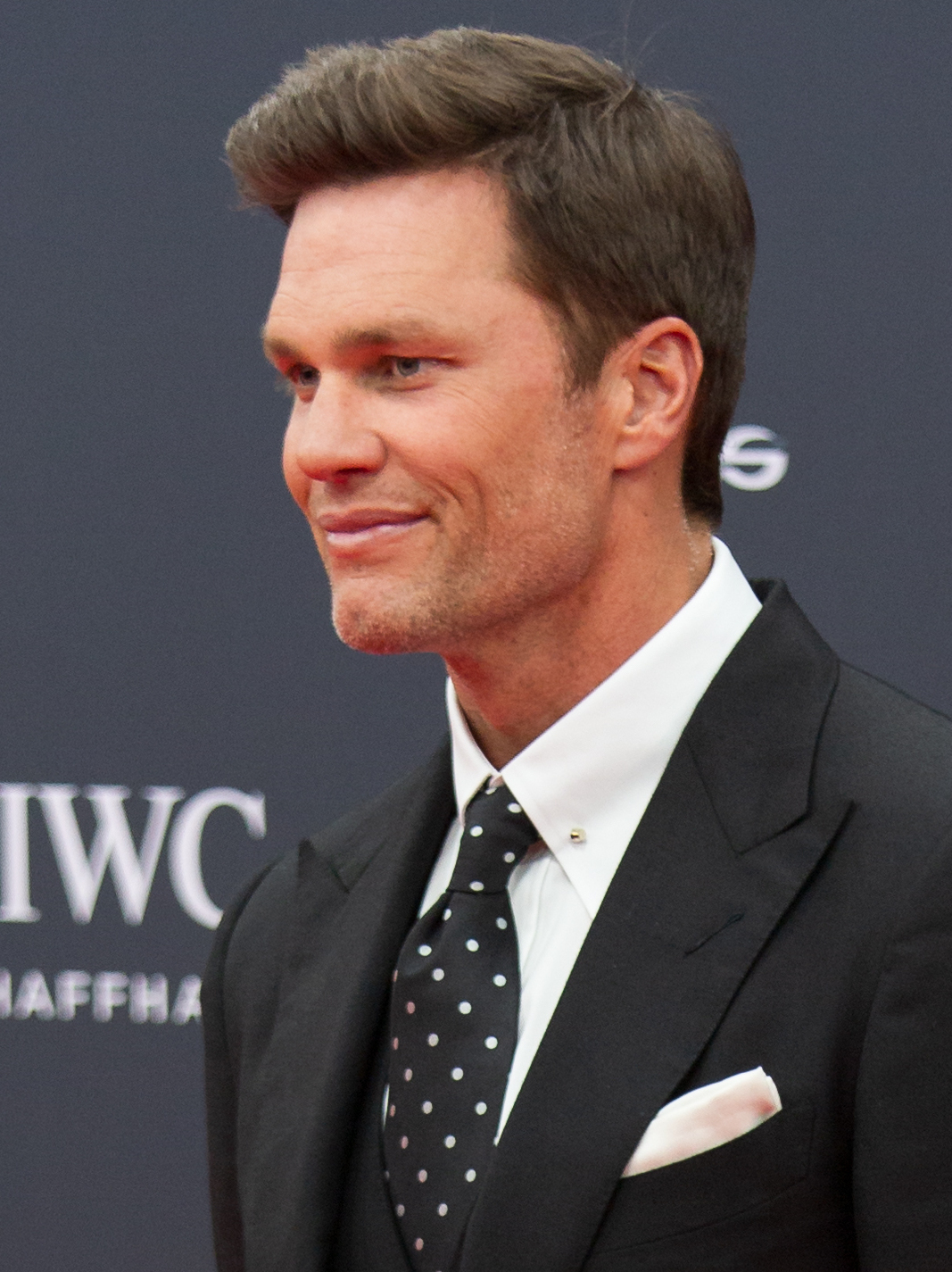
- Brady in 2024

No. 12
- Position: Quarterback

Personal information
- Born: August 3, 1977 (age 49); San Mateo, California, U.S.
- Listed height: 6 ft 4 in (1.93 m)
- Listed weight: 225 lb (102 kg)

Career information
- High school: Junípero Serra (San Mateo)
- College: Michigan (1995–1999)
- NFL draft: 2000: 6th round, 199th overall pick

Career history
- New England Patriots (2000–2019); Tampa Bay Buccaneers (2020–2022)

Awards and highlights
- 7× Super Bowl champion (XXXVI, XXXVIII, XXXIX, XLIX, LI, LIII, LV); 5× Super Bowl MVP (XXXVI, XXXVIII, XLIX, LI, LV); 3× NFL Most Valuable Player (2007, 2010, 2017); 2× NFL Offensive Player of the Year (2007, 2010); NFL Comeback Player of the Year (2009); 3× First-team All-Pro (2007, 2010, 2017); 3× Second-team All-Pro (2005, 2016, 2021); 15× Pro Bowl (2001, 2004, 2005, 2007, 2009–2018, 2021); 5× NFL passing touchdowns leader (2002, 2007, 2010, 2015, 2021); 4× NFL passing yards leader (2005, 2007, 2017, 2021); 2× NFL passer rating leader (2007, 2010); NFL completion percentage leader (2007); NFL 2000s All-Decade Team; NFL 2010s All-Decade Team; NFL 100th Anniversary All-Time Team; AP Male Athlete of the Year (2007); 2× SI Sportsman of the Year (2005, 2021); 2× SN Athlete of the Year (2004, 2007); New England Patriots Hall of Fame; New England Patriots All-2000s Team; New England Patriots All-2010s Team; New England Patriots 50th Anniversary Team; New England Patriots All-Dynasty Team; New England Patriots No. 12 retired; National champion (1997); NFL records: Career quarterback wins: 251; Career passing completions: 7,753; Career passing attempts: 12,050; Career passing touchdowns: 649; Career passing yards: 89,214; Passing completions in a season: 490 (2022); Passing attempts in a season: 733 (2022); Longest touchdown pass: 99 yards (tied); Career playoff quarterback wins: 35; Career playoff passing yards: 13,400; Career playoff passing touchdowns: 88; Most passing yards in a postseason game: 505; Most wins in a single regular season by a starting quarterback: 16 (2007)

Career NFL statistics
- Passing attempts: 12,050
- Passing completions: 7,753
- Completion percentage: 64.3%
- TD–INT: 649–212
- Passing yards: 89,214
- Passer rating: 97.2
- Stats at Pro Football Reference

Thomas Edward Patrick Brady Jr. (born August 3, 1977) is an American professional quarterback who played in the National Football League (NFL) for 23 seasons. He spent his first 20 seasons with the New England Patriots and was a central contributor to the team's dynasty from 2001 to 2019. In his final 3 seasons, he played for the Tampa Bay Buccaneers. One of the NFL's most decorated and accomplished players, Brady is widely cited as the greatest quarterback of all time. He is considered one of NFL's greatest players of all time and one of the greatest athletes in sports history.

After playing college football for the Michigan Wolverines, Brady was selected 199th overall by the Patriots in the sixth round of the 2000 NFL draft, later earning him a reputation as the NFL's biggest draft steal. He became the starting quarterback during his second season, which saw the Patriots win their first Super Bowl title in Super Bowl XXXVI. As the team's primary starter for 18 seasons, (Note: 2001–2007 and 2009–2019. Brady missed the majority of the 2008 season due to injury.) Brady led the Patriots to 17 division titles (including 11 consecutive from 2009 to 2019), 13 AFC Championship Games (including eight consecutive from 2011 to 2018), nine Super Bowl appearances, and six Super Bowl titles, all NFL records for a player and franchise. (Note: The Patriots are tied with the Pittsburgh Steelers with six Super Bowl titles. All other individual and franchise records listed are held outright by Brady and the Patriots respectively.) He joined the Buccaneers in 2020 and won Super Bowl LV, extending his individual records to 10 Super Bowl appearances and seven victories. In 2024, Brady became the lead color commentator for the NFL on Fox and a partial owner of the Las Vegas Raiders.

Brady holds many major quarterback records, including most career passing yards, completions, touchdown passes, and games started. He is the NFL leader in career quarterback wins, quarterback regular season wins, quarterback playoff wins, and Super Bowl Most Valuable Player (MVP) Awards, and the only Super Bowl MVP for two different franchises. Additional accolades held by Brady include the most Pro Bowl selections and the first unanimous NFL MVP. The only quarterback to win a Super Bowl in three separate decades, Brady is also noted for the longevity of his success. He was the oldest NFL MVP at age 40, the oldest Super Bowl MVP at age 43, and the oldest quarterback selected to the Pro Bowl at age 44. Brady is the only NFL quarterback named to two all-decade teams (2000s and 2010s) and was unanimously named to the 100th Anniversary All-Time Team in 2019.

== Early life ==
Thomas Edward Patrick Brady Jr. was born on August 3, 1977, in San Mateo, California, the only son and fourth child of Galynn Patricia (née Johnson) and Thomas Brady Sr. Brady was raised Catholic. His mother has Swedish, Norwegian, German, and Polish ancestry, while his father is of Irish descent; Brady has said his father is 100% Irish.

In the 1980s, Brady regularly attended San Francisco 49ers games at Candlestick Park, where he was a fan of quarterback Joe Montana; Brady has called Montana his idol and one of his inspirations. Aged four, Brady attended the 1981 NFC Championship, against the Dallas Cowboys, in which Montana threw "The Catch" to Dwight Clark. Brady attended football camp at the College of San Mateo, where he was taught to throw by camp counselor and future NFL/AFL quarterback Tony Graziani. Despite the rivalry between the teams, Brady grew up as a Los Angeles Lakers and Boston Celtics fan.

Brady attended Junípero Serra High School in San Mateo, where he graduated in 1995. He played football, basketball, and baseball in high school. He played against Bellarmine College Preparatory rival Pat Burrell in football and baseball. Brady began his career as the backup quarterback on the Padres junior varsity team. At first, Brady was not good enough to start on the 0–8 junior varsity team, which had not scored a touchdown all year. Brady ascended to the starting position when the main quarterback was injured. He became the varsity starter in his junior year and held it until he graduated. By Brady's senior year, he was striving to be noticed by college coaches. He created highlight tapes and sent them to schools he considered attending. This led to interest from many football programs.

The process of recruiting before the internet was very different; athletes' rankings were not as prominent. In the 2000s, Brady would have been considered a three or four-star recruit, and a highly rated prospect. Brady was on Blue Chip Illustrated and a Prep Football Report All-American selection. After his recruiting process, he narrowed his list to five schools. "Probably the ones that we did hear from and ultimately pared the list to were Cal–Berkeley, UCLA, USC, Michigan and Illinois," his father said. As a Cal-Berkeley fan, his father hoped Brady would attend the nearby school, where Brady was a silent commit, and that he would be able to watch his son play.

Brady was also known as a great baseball player in high school. He was a left-handed-batting catcher with power. His skills impressed MLB scouts, and he was drafted in the 18th round of the 1995 MLB draft by the Montreal Expos, after the team brought Brady to Candlestick Park to work out with players, an unusual decision. The Expos projected Brady as a potential All-Star, with then-GM Kevin Malone claiming Brady had the potential to be "one of the greatest catchers ever". The team offered him money typical of that offered to a late second-round or early third-round pick, but Brady was recruited by football assistant Bill Harris, to play for the University of Michigan in 1995. Brady became the last active athlete drafted by the Expos. He finished his high school career by completing 236 of 447 passes (53%) for 3,702 yards and 31 touchdowns. Brady won All-State and All-Far West honors and the team's Most Valuable Player Award.

During the summers of 1998 and 1999, Brady was an intern at Merrill Lynch. He was inducted into the Junípero Serra High School Hall of Fame in 2003. When Brady visited the school in 2012, after Super Bowl XLVI, administrators announced that they named the football stadium Brady Family Stadium.

== College career ==
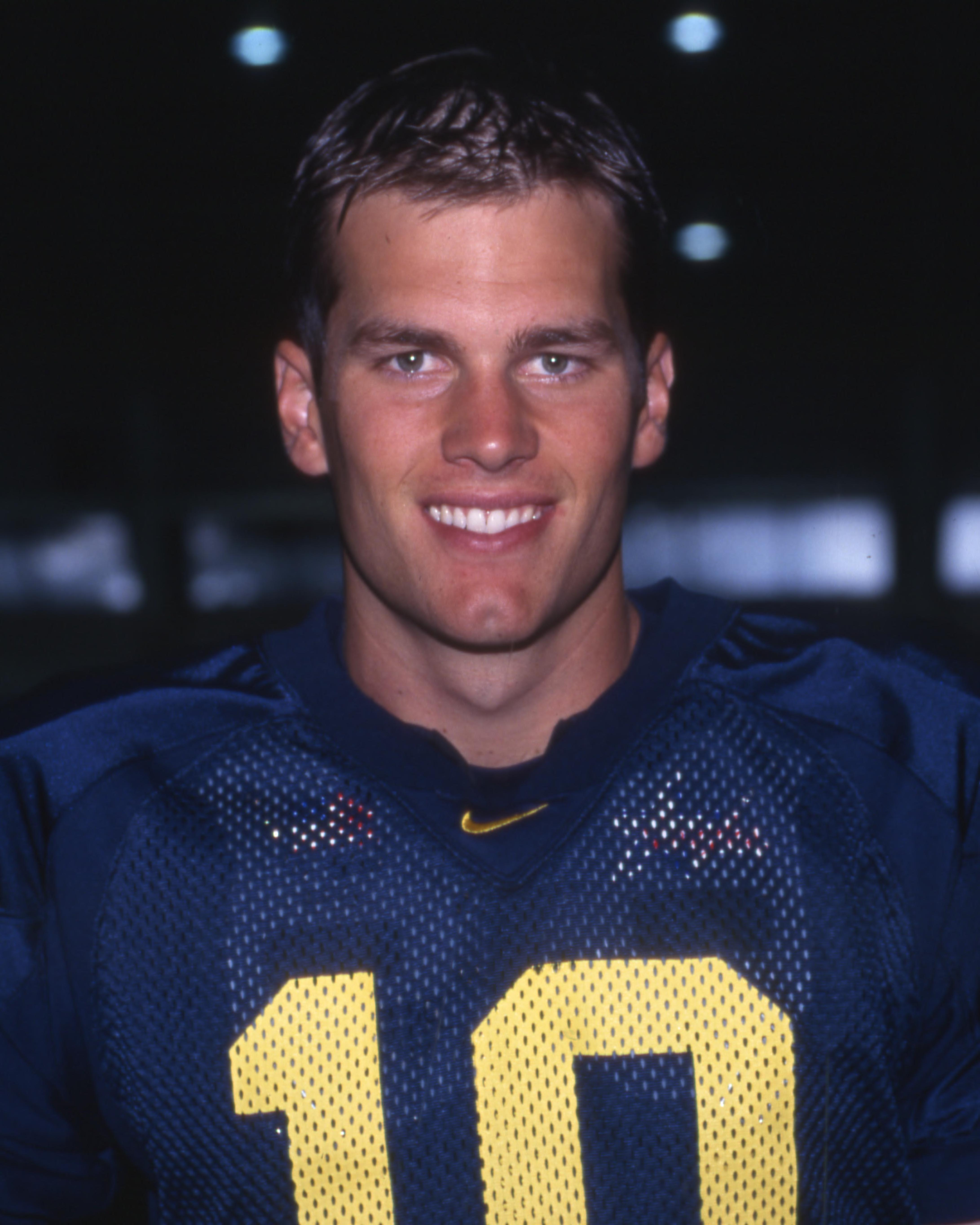
Brady as a senior for the Michigan Wolverines

Brady played college football at the University of Michigan for the Wolverines from 1995 to 1999. After redshirting in 1995, Brady spent the next two years as a backup quarterback, while future NFL quarterback Brian Griese led the 1997 Wolverines to an undefeated season, capped by victory in the 1998 Rose Bowl and a share of the national championship. Initially, Brady was seventh on the depth chart, and struggled to get playing time. Brady hired a sports psychologist to help him cope with frustration and anxiety, and considered transferring to the University of California, Berkeley. He worked closely with assistant athletic director Greg Harden, who met with Brady every week to build his confidence and maximize his performance. Brady told 60 Minutes in 2014: "He will always be somebody I rely on for sound advice and mentorship. He has helped me with my own personal struggles in both athletics and in life. Greg really pushed me in a direction that I wasn't sure I could go."

On September 28, 1996, Brady appeared in his first collegiate game after Michigan was up 35–3 against UCLA late in the fourth quarter. His first-ever pass attempt was intercepted by Phillip Ward and returned for a 42-yard touchdown.

Under Michigan head coach Lloyd Carr, Brady battled for the starting job with Drew Henson and ultimately started every game in the 1998 and 1999 seasons. Brady was All-Big Ten Conference honorable mention both seasons and team captain in his senior year. During his first full year as the starter, he set Michigan records for most pass attempts and completions in a season, for a total of 214. He set a school record for completions in a 31–16 loss against Ohio State in 1998, a season in which Michigan shared the Big Ten title. Brady capped that season with a 45–31 win over Arkansas in the 1999 Citrus Bowl.

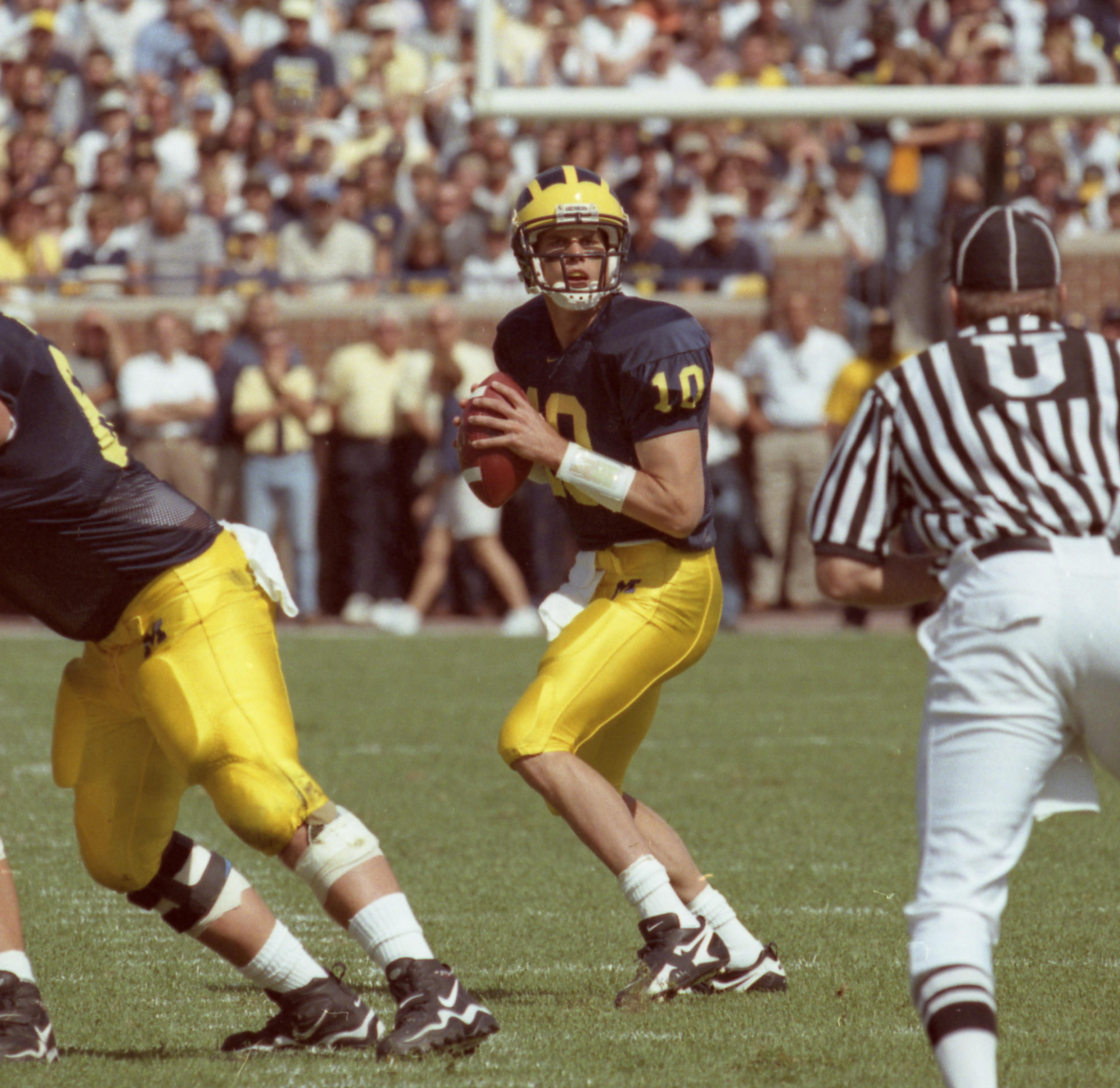
Brady in the pocket during a Michigan Wolverines home game in 1999

In the 1999 season, Brady had to hold off Henson again for the starting job. They platooned during the first seven games, with Brady playing the first quarter, Henson second, and Carr deciding upon a quarterback for the second half. The 1999 Wolverines started with a 5–0 record, including a 26–22 win over Notre Dame, and a road win against eventual powerhouse Wisconsin. Against Michigan State, Brady was not chosen to play the second half; however, after being reinserted with Michigan down by 17 points, he nearly led Michigan all the way back before losing 34–31. After a 300-yard passing game the following week, Carr went exclusively with Brady for the remainder of the season. On October 30 against Indiana, Brady played the entire game for the first time in the season and threw for 226 yards, his fifth straight game throwing for 200 yards, to lead Michigan in a 34–31 win. Against Penn State, Brady led Michigan to another 4th-quarter comeback in a 31–27 win, heading into the regular season's final game as winners of three straight.

Michigan concluded the regular season against Ohio State; this was a dramatic game with a trip to the Orange Bowl on the line. With five minutes left, tied 17–17, Brady led Michigan to the winning score. He led Michigan to an overtime win in the 2000 Orange Bowl over Alabama, throwing for 369 yards and four touchdowns, leading the team back from two 14-point deficits in regulation. He threw the game-winning score on a bootleg play. Michigan won when Alabama missed an extra point following its touchdown. Brady set a BCS bowl game record with 35 completions.

In the two seasons Brady started at Michigan, he posted a 20–5 record, including wins at the 1999 Citrus Bowl and 2000 Orange Bowl. Brady finished his career ranking third in Michigan history with 710 attempts and 442 completions, fourth with 5,351 yards and 62 completion percentage, and fifth with 35 touchdown passes. He graduated in December 1999 with a Bachelor of Arts in General Studies.

== Professional career ==
=== Overview ===
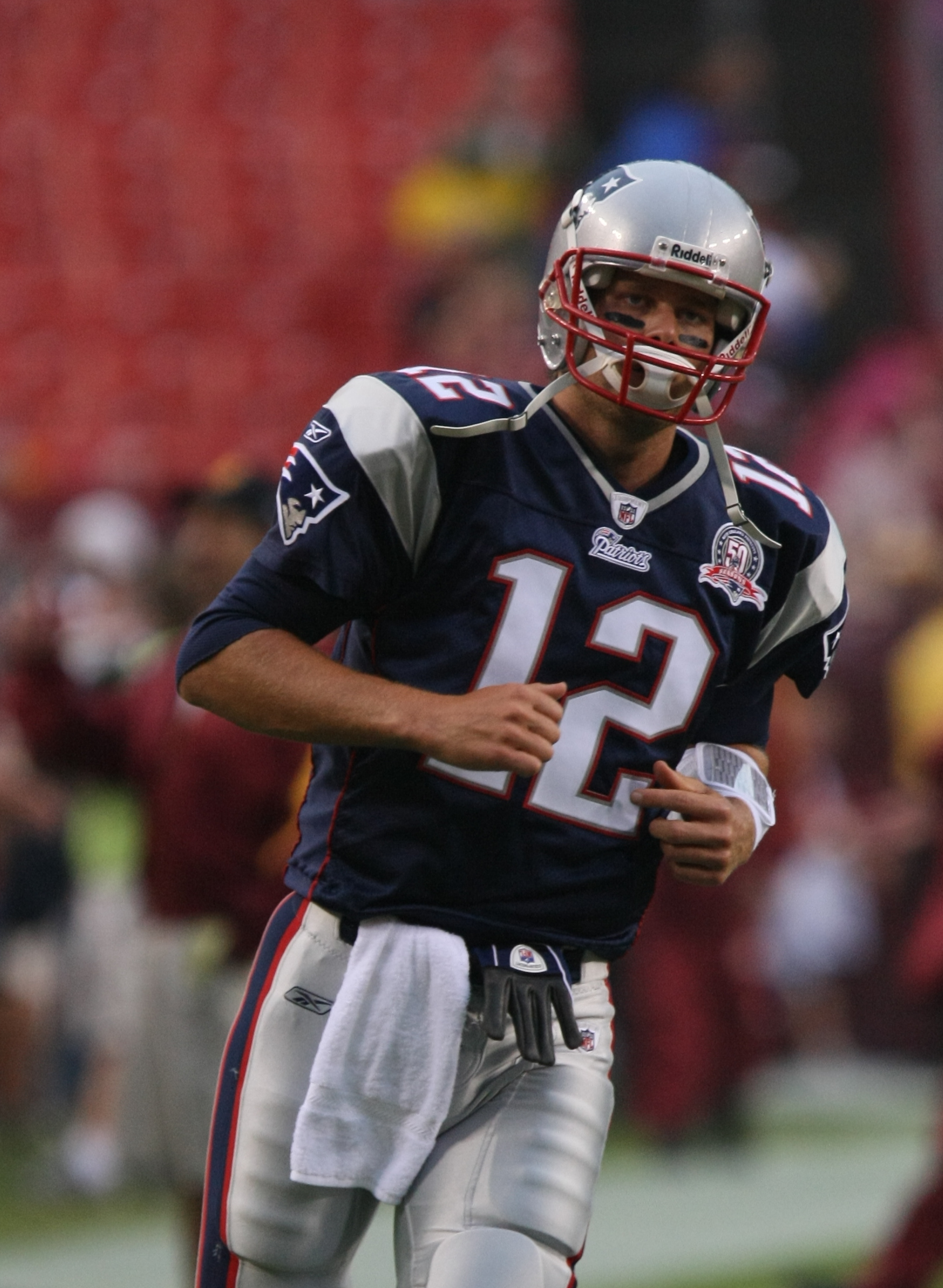
Brady with the Patriots in 2009

Being a classic pocket passer, Brady's success has been attributed to his work ethic, competitive spirit, pocket awareness and movement despite lacking elite mobility, and intelligence. Across 23 seasons, he started 333 regular season and 48 playoff games, the most for an NFL quarterback, spending 20 seasons with the Patriots and three with the Buccaneers. He was the primary starter for 21 seasons, missing 2008 due to injury, and never played a snap where his team was mathematically eliminated from playoff contention. He won 251 regular season and 35 postseason games, the most in NFL history, and is the only quarterback to win 200 regular season games. He won 17 AFC East titles with New England and led Tampa Bay to a wild card berth in 2020 and NFC South titles in 2021 and 2022. Brady is the only quarterback to lead a team to a 16–0 regular season (2007), became one of four quarterbacks to defeat all 32 teams in 2021, holds the most Pro Bowl selections (15), and was named league MVP three times (2007, 2010, 2017), with his 2010 award being the first unanimous MVP.

Brady's 21 seasons as the primary starter led to seven Super Bowl titles, the most of any player and more than any NFL franchise. He appeared in a record 10 Super Bowls and is one of two quarterbacks, along with Peyton Manning, to win with multiple franchises, earning six titles with the Patriots and one with the Buccaneers. Brady holds the record for Super Bowl MVP awards with five and is the only player to win it with multiple teams. Holding nearly every major quarterback record, he is the all-time leader in passing yards, attempts, and touchdowns in both the regular season and playoffs, the only quarterback with 600 career regular-season touchdowns, and the record holder for completions. In 333 career starts, he is the only quarterback with three separate streaks of over 100 consecutive starts, with his first ending due to injury in 2008 and his second due to suspension in 2016. His longevity led to multiple age-related records.

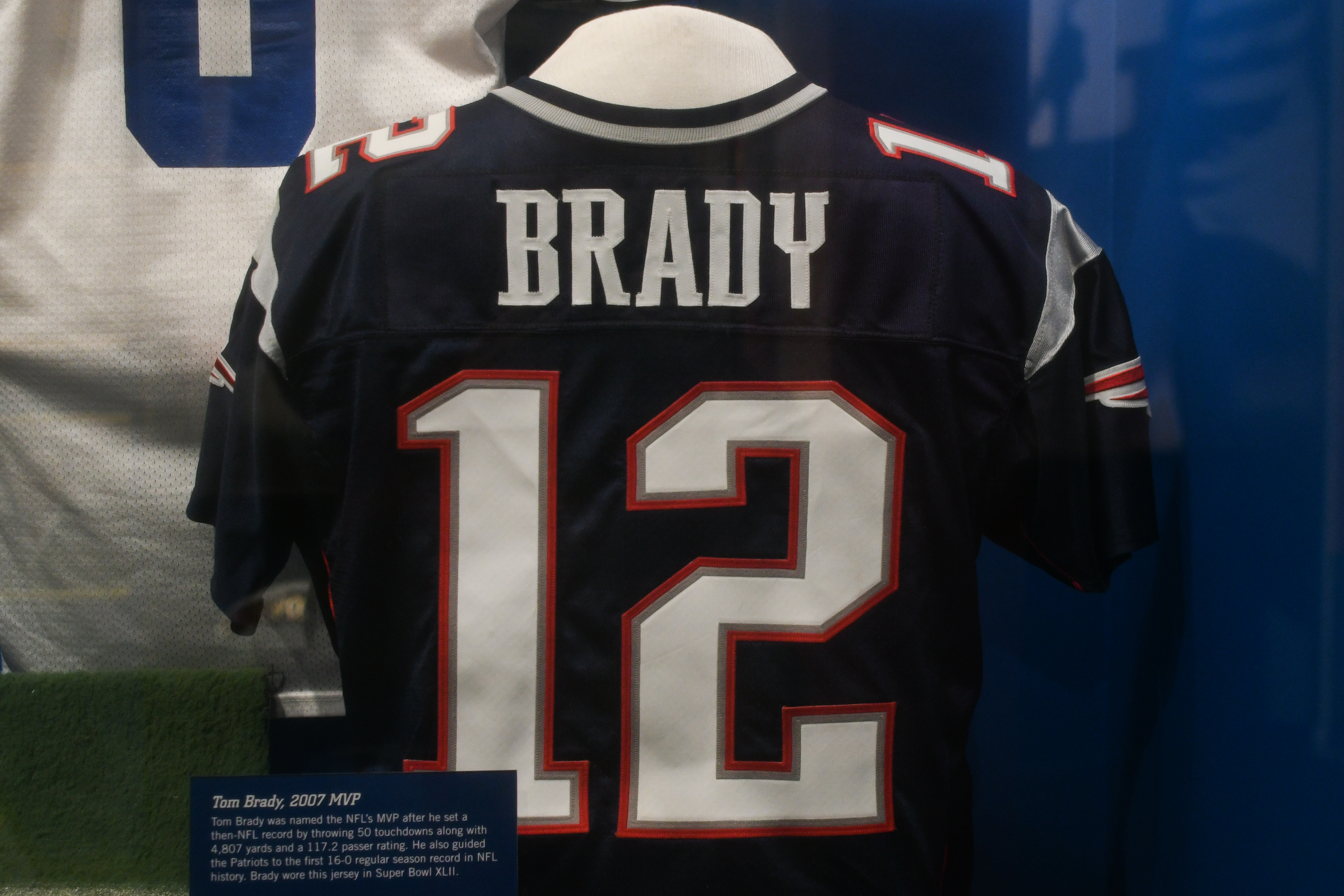
A game-worn jersey of Brady's in the Pro Football Hall of Fame

On the Patriots, Brady and head coach Bill Belichick formed the NFL's most successful quarterback–head coach tandem, leading the team's dynasty from 2001 to 2019, commonly referred to as the Brady–Belichick era. The Patriots' dynasty is one of the greatest in sports history, with Brady's contributions helping the team set records for Super Bowl appearances (11) and wins (6, tied with the Pittsburgh Steelers). In Brady's first season as the primary starter, the Patriots won their first championship in Super Bowl XXXVI, followed by consecutive titles in 2003 and 2004. The Patriots won an NFL-record 21 consecutive games (regular season and playoffs) during this period, while Brady won his first 10 consecutive postseason games, another record.

When Brady signed with Tampa Bay in 2020, the team had not reached the postseason since 2007 or won a playoff game since 2002. Brady helped end both droughts en route to the Buccaneers winning Super Bowl LV. In 2021, he set the season record for completions and led the league in passing yards and touchdowns; his passing yards were a career high. In his final season, despite finishing with a losing record for the first time, Brady broke his single-season completion record and set the season record for attempts.

=== New England Patriots ===
==== 2000: Draft and rookie season on the bench ====
Pre-draft measurables
Height	Weight	Arm length	Hand span	40-yard dash	10-yard split	20-yard split	20-yard shuttle	Three-cone drill	Vertical jump	Broad jump	Wonderlic
6 ft 4 3/8 in (1.94 m)	211 lb (96 kg)	32 3/4 in (0.83 m)	9 3/8 in (0.24 m)	5.28 s	1.75 s	2.99 s	4.38 s	7.20 s	24.5 in (0.62 m)	8 ft 3 in (2.51 m)	33
All values from NFL Combine

Brady was a lightly regarded prospect coming out of college, with an unimpressive NFL Scouting Combine performance reinforcing this reputation. As a result, he was not selected until the sixth round of the 2000 NFL draft by the New England Patriots, 199th overall, a compensatory pick the Patriots earned due to the loss of punter Tom Tupa, he was the seventh quarterback taken. Brady and his family believed he would be drafted in the second or third round; they watched on television, stunned as six other quarterbacks were drafted before him. Brady was so embarrassed he briefly left the family home during the sixth round and cried when recalling the experience for an interview 11 years later. Brady later said that when the Patriots notified him he would be drafted, he was grateful he would not "have to be an insurance salesman". According to Michael Holley's book Patriot Reign, the Patriots were considering Brady and Tim Rattay, both of whom had received positive reviews from then-quarterbacks coach Dick Rehbein. Ultimately, the Patriots front office chose Brady. Considering his success, many analysts have called Brady the best NFL draft pick of all time. Patriots owner Robert Kraft recalled: "I still have the image of Tom Brady coming down the old Foxboro Stadium steps with that pizza box under his arm, a skinny beanpole, and when he introduced himself to me and said 'Hi Mr. Kraft,' he was about to say who he was, but I said 'I know who you are, you're Tom Brady. You're our sixth round draft choice,'" recalled Kraft. "And he looked me in the eye and said 'I'm the best decision this organization has ever made.' It looks like he could be right."

Brady started the 2000 season as the fourth-string quarterback, behind starter Drew Bledsoe and backups John Friesz and Michael Bishop; by the end of the season, he was number two on the depth chart behind Bledsoe. During his rookie season, he was 1-for-3 passing, for six yards. Tight end Rod Rutledge caught Brady's first and only completed pass of the season in a 34–9 loss to the Detroit Lions.

==== 2001: Taking over as starter and first Super Bowl victory ====
With Bledsoe as starting quarterback, the Patriots opened the 2001 season with a 23–17 road loss to the Cincinnati Bengals. In their second game and home opener on September 23, the Patriots squared off against their AFC East rivals, the New York Jets. Bledsoe was again the starter; in the fourth quarter, he suffered internal bleeding after a hit from Jets linebacker Mo Lewis. Bledsoe returned for the next series, but was replaced with Brady for the Patriots' final series of the game. New York held on to win 10–3, and the Patriots fell to 0–2 on the season. Brady was named the starter for the season's third game, against the Indianapolis Colts, in which the Patriots posted a 44–13 win.

In the Patriots' fifth game, Brady began to find his stride. Trailing the visiting San Diego Chargers 26–16 in the fourth quarter, he led the Patriots on two scoring drives to force overtime, and another in overtime to set up a winning field goal for a 29–26 victory. Brady finished with 33 of 54, for 364 yards and two touchdowns, and was named AFC Offensive Player of the Week for the first time. The following week, Brady again played well during the rematch at Indianapolis, with a passer rating of 148.3 in a 38–17 win. Brady won his second AFC Offensive Player of the Week nomination after a four-touchdown day in a 34–17 win over the New Orleans Saints in Week 11. The Patriots went on to win eleven of the fourteen games Brady started, and six straight to finish the regular season, winning the AFC East and entering the NFL playoffs with a first-round bye. He finished the 2001 season with 2,843 passing yards and 18 touchdowns, earning an invitation to the Pro Bowl.

In Brady's first playoff game, he threw for 312 yards against the Oakland Raiders and led the Patriots back from a ten-point fourth-quarter deficit to send the game to overtime, where they won on a field goal 16–13. A controversial play occurred in the fourth quarter. Trailing by three points, Brady lost control of the ball after being hit by Raiders cornerback and former Michigan teammate Charles Woodson. Oakland initially recovered the ball but, citing the "tuck rule" – which states that any forward throwing motion by a quarterback begins a pass even if the quarterback loses possession of the ball as he is attempting to tuck it back toward his body – referee Walt Coleman overturned the call on instant replay, ruling it an incomplete pass rather than a fumble. Brady finished the game 32-of-52 for 312 passing yards and one interception.

In the AFC Championship Game against the Steelers, Brady injured his knee, and he was relieved by Bledsoe. The Patriots won the game by a score of 24–17. Subsequently, Las Vegas oddsmakers positioned them as 14-point underdogs against the NFC champion St. Louis Rams in Super Bowl XXXVI.

Brady returned from his knee injury to start in the Super Bowl at the Louisiana Superdome in New Orleans. Despite being heavy underdogs, the Patriots played well, holding the Rams' high-powered offense in check through the first three quarters. The Rams rallied from a 17–3 deficit to tie the game with 1:30 left in regulation. The Patriots then got the ball back at their own 17-yard line with no timeouts remaining. Sportscaster and former Super Bowl-winning coach John Madden argued that the Patriots should run out the clock and try to win in overtime. Instead, Brady drove the Patriots' offense down the field to the Rams' 31-yard line before spiking the ball with seven seconds left. Kicker Adam Vinatieri converted a 48-yard field goal as time expired to give the Patriots a 20–17 win and their first ever league championship. When discussing the game-winning drive, Madden stated that "what Tom Brady just did, gives me goosebumps". Brady was named Super Bowl MVP while throwing for 145 yards, one touchdown, and no interceptions. Aged 24 years and 6 months, Brady became the youngest quarterback to win a Super Bowl, surpassing Joe Namath (III) and Joe Montana (XVI). Bledsoe was traded to the Buffalo Bills in April, which cemented Brady's status as the Patriots' starting quarterback in 2002.

==== 2002 season ====
In the Patriots' season opener, Brady had 294 passing yards and three touchdowns in the 30–14 win over the Steelers, and earned his third AFC Offensive Player of the Week title. In Week 9, Brady won his fourth AFC Offensive Player of the Week title for a three-touchdown game in a 38–7 win over Buffalo. Brady and the Patriots finished the season at 9–7, tied with the Jets and Miami Dolphins for the best record in the division; however, the Patriots lost the division title to the Jets on tiebreakers. Additionally, the Patriots lost the tiebreaker to the Cleveland Browns for the final wild card spot, causing them to miss the playoffs. Though Brady posted a career-low single-season passer rating of 85.7 and a career high of 14 interceptions, he threw for a league-leading 28 touchdown passes.

==== 2003 and 2004 seasons: Back-to-back Super Bowl wins ====
After opening the 2003 season at 2–2, Brady led the Patriots to twelve consecutive victories to finish the regular season at 14–2 to win the AFC East. In Week 14, a 12–0 victory over the Dolphins, he recorded a 36-yard punt. He won AFC Offensive Player of the Week twice, in Weeks 9 and 17. Brady finished with 3,620 passing yards and 23 touchdowns, and was third in NFL MVP voting to co-winners Peyton Manning and Steve McNair.

After earning a first-round bye, the Patriots defeated the Tennessee Titans in the Divisional Round, 17–14. In the AFC Championship Game, they defeated the Colts, 24–14. In Super Bowl XXXVIII, Brady led the Patriots to a 32–29 victory over the NFC champion Carolina Panthers and was named Super Bowl MVP for the second time. Brady threw for 354 yards with three touchdowns and set the record for most completions by a quarterback in a Super Bowl with 32. With 1:08 left in the fourth quarter and the score tied 29–29, Brady led a drive with five completions to put the Patriots in position for the game-winning 41-yard field goal by Vinatieri.

During the 2004 season, Brady helped the Patriots set an NFL record with 21 straight wins dating from the previous year, an accomplishment honored in the Pro Football Hall of Fame (for official records, the NFL considers it an 18-game regular season winning streak; it does not count playoff games). New England finished with a 14–2 record, equaling their 2003 record and the best regular-season record ever for a defending champion at the time (though this would later be surpassed by the 2011 Green Bay Packers, who defended their 2010 championship season with a 15–1 record). The Patriots also won the AFC East title for the third time in four years. Brady threw for 3,692 yards and 28 touchdowns, with a 92.6 passer rating, and was voted to his second Pro Bowl.

In the playoffs, Brady led the Patriots to wins over the Colts in the Divisional Round by a score of 20–3 and the Steelers in the AFC Championship by a score of 41–27. Brady played his best game of the year in Pittsburgh despite requiring intravenous therapy the previous night when he ran a temperature of 103 °F. Against the NFL's best defense, he recorded a quarterback passer rating of 130.5, his highest of the season. In Super Bowl XXXIX, the Patriots defeated the Philadelphia Eagles, 24–21, capturing their third championship in four years. They became the first franchise since the Dallas Cowboys to do so. Up until the 2023 season, the 2004 New England Patriots were the last NFL team to win a second straight Super Bowl. Brady threw for 236 yards and two touchdowns in the win.

==== 2005 and 2006 seasons ====
During the 2005 season, injuries suffered by running backs forced the Patriots to rely more on Brady's passing. Brady had to adjust to new center Russ Hochstein and running back Heath Evans. Brady won AFC Offensive Player of the Week for his Week 5 350-yard, three-touchdown victory over the Falcons. Brady finished the season with 4,110 yards and 26 touchdowns, the former of which led the league. He and the Patriots finished with a 10–6 record, winning their third straight AFC East title. He was named to his third Pro Bowl.

In the playoffs, Brady recorded 201 passing yards and three passing touchdowns to lead the Patriots to a 28–3 victory over the Jacksonville Jaguars in the Wild Card Round. In the Divisional Round the Patriots lost 27–13 to the Denver Broncos. Brady threw for 341 yards in the game with one touchdown and two interceptions in his first playoff loss, after ten victories. After the season's end, it was revealed Brady had been playing with a sports hernia since December.

In 2006, Brady led the Patriots to a 12–4 record and the fourth seed in the AFC playoffs. Brady finished the regular season with 3,529 yards and 24 touchdowns. He was not among the players initially selected to the Pro Bowl, though was offered an injury-replacement selection when Chargers quarterback Philip Rivers was forced to withdraw; Brady declined.

In the postseason, the Patriots first hosted their division rivals, the Jets, in the Wild Card Round. The Patriots defeated the Jets 37–16, as Brady went 22–34 for 212 yards and two touchdowns. The Patriots traveled to San Diego to take on the Chargers in the Divisional Round. This was Brady's first playoff game in his home state of California. The Patriots struggled against the Chargers, whom many had picked as favorites to win Super Bowl XLI. With eight minutes left in the fourth quarter and the Patriots down by eight, Brady and the Patriots started a drive that ultimately decided the game. Brady threw a fourth-down interception to safety Marlon McCree, but wide receiver Troy Brown forced a fumble on McCree that wide receiver Reche Caldwell recovered to convert the first down. With a new set of downs, Brady threw a touchdown pass to Caldwell and Faulk scored the two-point conversion to tie the game. On what would be the Patriots' final drive, Brady threw a 49-yard pass play to Caldwell, setting-up a field goal that gave New England a 24–21 lead with 1:10 remaining. The Chargers drove down the field, but missed a game-tying field goal attempt, as the Patriots held on to win.

In the AFC Championship, the Patriots traveled to Indianapolis to play the Colts. The Patriots led at halftime, 21–6; however, Peyton Manning led the Colts to a comeback. Brady threw a late-game interception and the Patriots lost, 38–34. Brady finished the loss 21 of 34 for 232 yards, one touchdown, and one interception.

==== 2007: Perfect regular season and first MVP ====
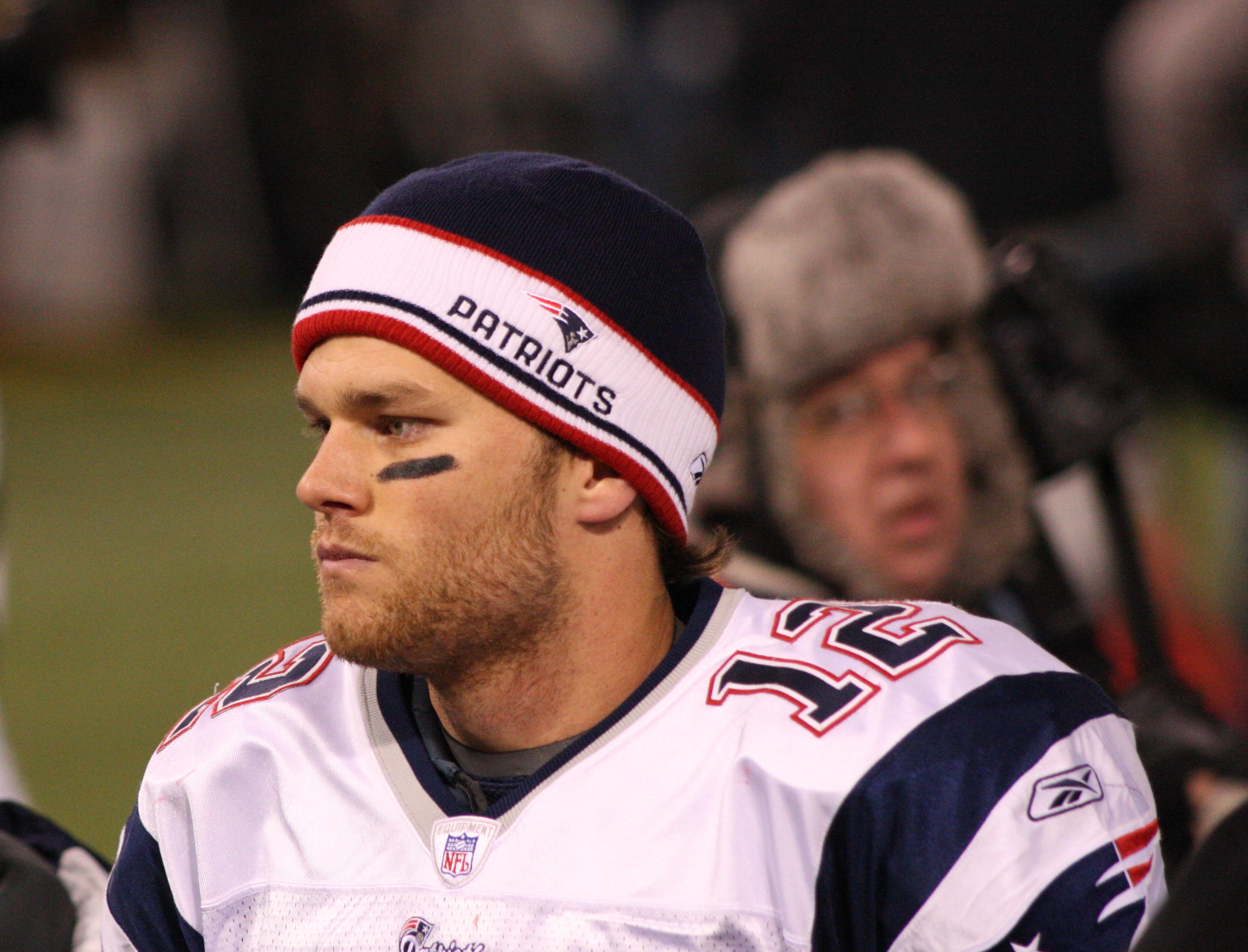
Brady during his first MVP season in 2007

Playing with an overhauled receiver corps—in the 2007 off-season, the Patriots acquired wide receivers Donté Stallworth, Wes Welker, Kelley Washington, and Randy Moss; tight end Kyle Brady; and running back Sammy Morris—Brady enjoyed one of the best seasons by a quarterback. Brady was named AFC Offensive Player of the Month for September and October. Brady led the Patriots to the first 16–0 regular-season record in NFL history, outscoring opponents by an average of 37–17. He attained career, franchise, and NFL records and milestones in the process. He was named as the AFC Offensive Player of the Week five times. In a Week 6 game against the Dallas Cowboys, he had a career-high five passing touchdowns in a 48–27 win. The win tied him with Hall of Fame quarterback Roger Staubach for the most wins by a starting quarterback, in his first 100 regular-season starts, with 76. The next week, in part of a 49–28 win against the Dolphins, he had another record day, with a career-high six passing touchdowns, setting a franchise record. He had the first game with a perfect passer rating of his career. As part of a come-from-behind 24–20 victory against the Colts, he threw for another three touchdowns, the ninth consecutive game in which he had done so, breaking Peyton Manning's record of eight. During the last game of the season against the Giants in which the Patriots won 38–35, Brady threw his 50th touchdown of the season, breaking Manning's single-season record of 49 from 2004.

Brady finished the season with 4,806 passing yards, 50 touchdown passes, eight interceptions, and a career-high 117.2 passer rating. It was unanimously voted the greatest passing season ever by ESPN in 2013. His 50:8 touchdown to interception ratio was a then-NFL record. He became the first quarterback to pass for 50 touchdowns. He led the Patriots to the first undefeated regular season since the 16-game schedule was implemented in 1978. He directed an offense that scored a then-NFL record 589 points and 75 total touchdowns. The team's 50 total touchdown passes is the fourth-most ever in a season. Brady was named the Most Valuable Player and Offensive Player of the Year. He was honored by the Associated Press as their Male Athlete of the Year, the first time an NFL player earned the honor since Montana won in 1990. He was named as a First-Team All-Pro and to his fourth career Pro Bowl.

In the Patriots' first playoff game, a Divisional Round game against the Jaguars, Brady began with an NFL postseason record 16 consecutive completed passes, and finished with 26 completions in 28 attempts, a completion rate of 92.9% as the Patriots won 31–20. That is the highest single-game completion percentage (with at least 20 attempts) in NFL postseason history. With the win, the Patriots matched the undefeated 1972 Miami Dolphins as the only team to win 17 consecutive games in one season.

Statistically, Brady did not fare as well in the AFC Championship Game against the Chargers, throwing for 209 yards, two touchdowns, and three interceptions. Nevertheless, the Patriots won their 18th game of the season, 21–12, to advance to the Super Bowl for the fourth time in seven seasons. Brady, with the 100th win of his career, also set an NFL record for the fewest games needed by a starting quarterback to do so: his 100–26 record is sixteen games better than Joe Montana's. In Super Bowl XLII against the New York Giants, Brady was pressured heavily and sacked five times. The Patriots managed to take the lead with a Brady touchdown to Moss with less than three minutes remaining in the fourth quarter, but the Giants were able to drive and score a last-minute touchdown to upset the Patriots 17–14, taking away what would have been the first perfect season since the NFL expanded its regular season to 16 games.

==== 2008: Injury ====
In the Patriots' season opener against the Kansas City Chiefs at Gillette Stadium (in which the Patriots won 17–10), Brady's left knee was seriously injured midway through the first quarter on a hit by Chiefs safety Bernard Pollard; Brady left the game and did not return. The team later confirmed that he would require surgery, and it would prematurely end his 2008 season. Brady tore both his anterior cruciate ligament and medial collateral ligament. The injury ended Brady's streak of 111 consecutive starts. Dr. Neal ElAttrache performed the anterior cruciate ligament reconstruction at the Los Angeles Kerlan-Jobe Orthopaedic Clinic on October 6, using Brady's patellar tendon graft to replace the torn ligament, and also repaired his medial collateral ligament, through a separate incision in his left knee. An infection in the wound resulted in further debridement surgery several times since the original procedure. Brady received IV antibiotics for this infection which, at the time, threatened to delay his rehab. Despite Brady's absence, the Patriots managed to finish the 2008 season with an 11–5 record; however, due to tiebreakers, the Patriots not only failed to win the AFC East division title, but missed the playoffs altogether for the first time since the 2002 season.

==== 2009: Return from injury ====
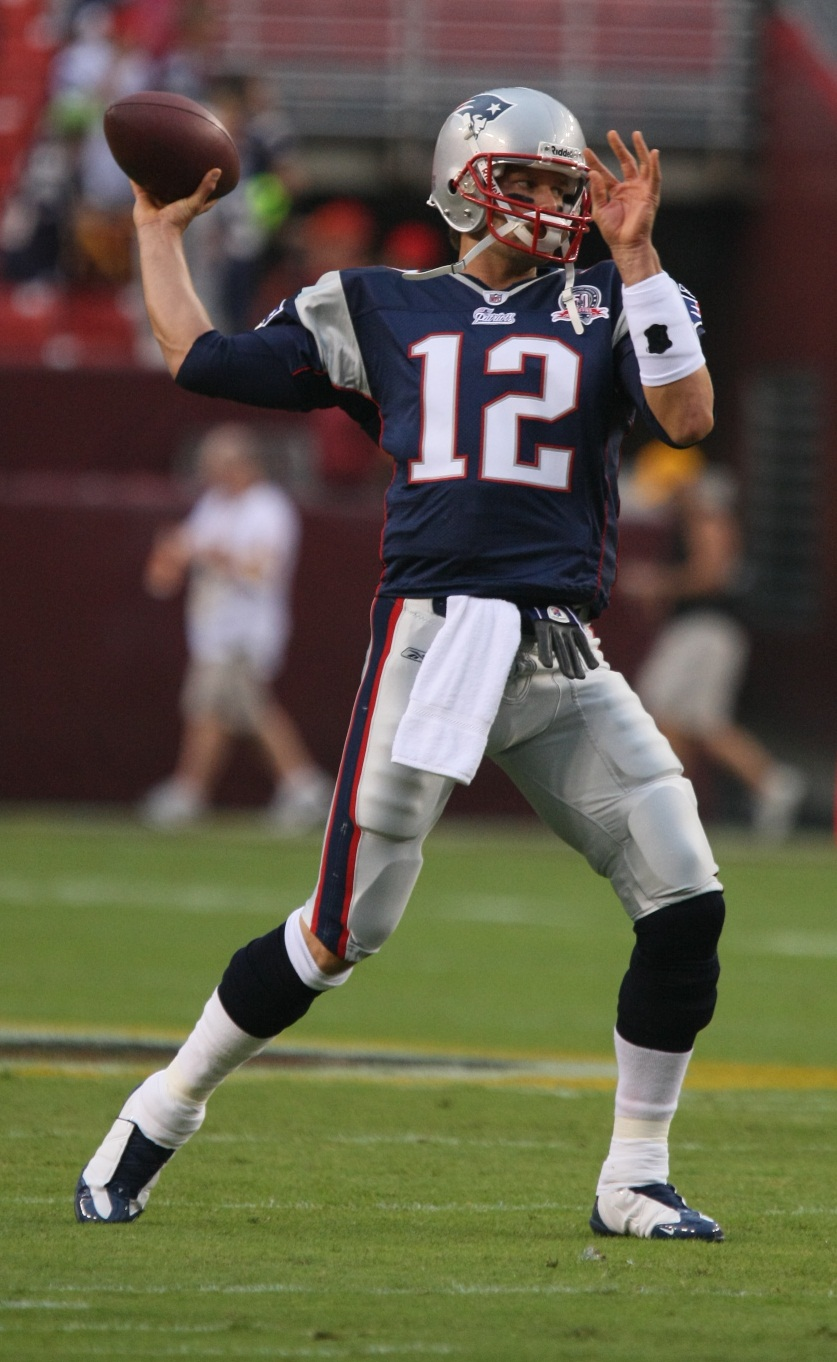
Brady in action against the Washington Redskins on August 28, 2009

In the 2009 season opener against the Bills, Brady's first game in more than a year, he threw for 378 yards and two touchdowns. In the final three minutes of the game, the Patriots were down 24–13 before Brady and tight end Benjamin Watson connected on two straight touchdowns to lead the Patriots to a 25–24 win. He won AFC Offensive Player of the Week for his performance against the Bills.

On October 18, 2009, under blizzard conditions, Brady set an NFL record against the Titans for most touchdowns in a quarter, throwing five in the second quarter. Brady finished the game with six touchdowns, tying his career high from the 2007 season, and 380 yards, completing 29-of-34 attempts, finishing with a nearly perfect passer rating of 152.8. The Patriots' 59–0 victory over the Titans tied the record for the largest margin of victory since the 1970 AFL-NFL merger, and set a record for largest halftime lead in NFL history, which was 45–0. He won AFC Offensive Player of the Week for his game against the Titans. Brady was later named AFC Offensive Player of the Month for October. For Week 16, Brady won AFC Offensive Player of the Week for a four-touchdown game in a 35–7 win over the Jaguars.

Brady finished the 2009 regular season with 4,398 yards passing and 28 touchdowns for a 96.2 rating, despite a broken right ring finger and three fractured ribs, which were suffered over the course of the season. He was selected as a reserve to the 2010 Pro Bowl and named the 2009 NFL Comeback Player of the Year.

Brady ended the 2009 season throwing for 154 passing yards, two touchdowns, and three interceptions in a 33–14 Wild Card Round loss to the Baltimore Ravens. This was his first career home playoff loss and the Patriots' first home playoff loss since 1978.

==== 2010: Second MVP ====
On September 10, 2010, Brady signed a four-year, $72 million contract extension, making him the highest-paid player in the NFL. The extension included $48.5 million in guaranteed money.

Brady became the fastest quarterback to achieve 100 regular season wins by helping his team defeat the Dolphins 41–14 on October 4. On November 25, in a Thanksgiving Day game against the Lions, he earned a perfect passer rating for the second time in his career as the Patriots won 45–24. The next week, a 45–3 victory over the Jets, Brady set a record of 26 consecutive regular-season home wins, breaking Brett Favre's record. He won AFC Offensive Player of the Week for the two games against the Lions and Jets. For December, Brady was named AFC Offensive Player of the Month. Brady threw for 3,900 yards with 36 touchdowns and only four interceptions on the season.

Brady was selected as a starter to the 2011 Pro Bowl. However, he pulled out of the game (and was replaced by his former backup Matt Cassel, who then played for the Chiefs) after undergoing surgery for a stress fracture in his right foot dating back to 2008. Brady was also the only unanimous selection for the AP All-Pro Team and was named the 2010 AP NFL Offensive Player of the Year. By unanimous decision, he won the MVP award for the second time in his career. On the inaugural NFL Top 100 Players list, Brady was ranked as the best player in the NFL by his peers.

After earning the #1 seed and a bye week, the Patriots lost to the Jets in the Divisional Round, 28–21. Brady finished the game 29-of-45 for 299 yards, two touchdowns, and one interception which ended his NFL record of consecutive pass attempts without an interception at 340.

==== 2011: Loss in Super Bowl XLVI ====
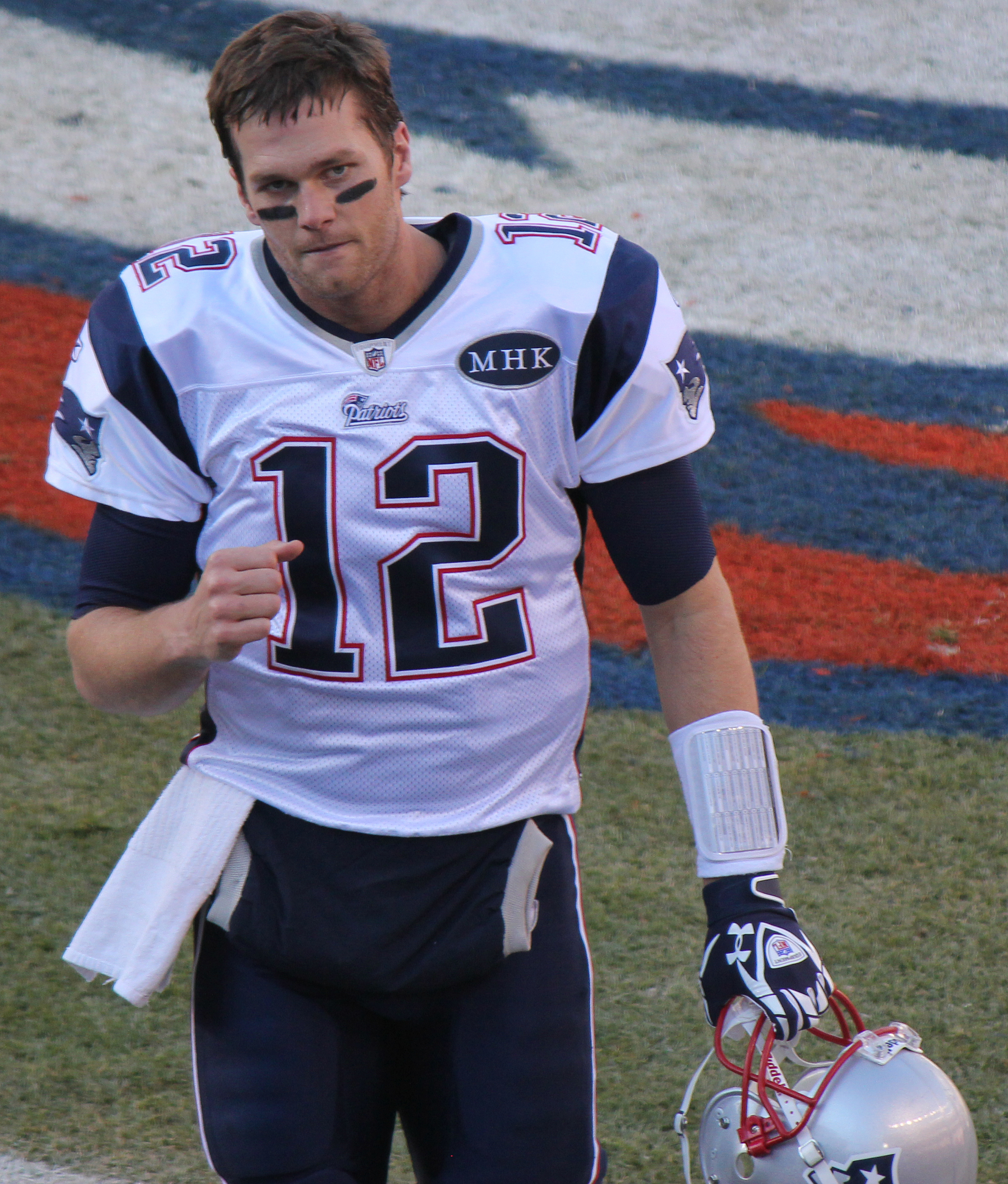
Brady in Denver in 2011

In Week 1 of the 2011 season, Brady threw for a career-high 517 yards, four touchdowns, and one interception in a 38–24 win over the Dolphins and earned AFC Offensive Player of the Week honors. In the game, he threw a record-tying 99-yard touchdown pass to Wes Welker. Brady won AFC Offensive Player of the Week for the following game against the Chargers. He had 423 yards and three touchdowns in the 35–21 victory. Brady closed out the season being named AFC Offensive Player of the Month for November and December. In addition, he was the Week 16 AFC Offensive Player of the Week. Brady had a statistically successful season, and in the regular season finale against the Bills (a 49–21 win), he became the fourth quarterback to throw for 5,000 yards in a season, finishing with 5,235; although Brady surpassed Dan Marino's longstanding record of 5,084 passing yards, he finished the season second in passing yards behind Drew Brees' 5,476. The Patriots finished the season 13–3 and clinched the AFC's #1 seed. For his efforts in the 2011 season, Brady was named to the Pro Bowl and was named as the fourth-best player in the NFL on the NFL Top 100 Players of 2012 by his peers.

There's no quarterback I'd rather have than Tom Brady. He's the best. He does so much for us in so many ways on so many different levels. I'm very fortunate that he's our quarterback and what he's able to do for this team. It's good to win with him and all the rest of our players. If that's more than somebody else did, I don't really care about that.

— Bill Belichick, following the 2011 AFC Championship Game

Brady led the Patriots to a 45–10 win over the Broncos in the Divisional Round, where he tied an NFL playoff record shared by Daryle Lamonica and Steve Young, throwing for six touchdown passes. The win gave Brady and Patriots head coach Bill Belichick sole possession of the NFL record for postseason wins by a quarterback–head coach duo with 15. In the AFC Championship game against the Ravens, Brady failed to throw a touchdown pass for the first time in 36 games, though he did score a one-yard rushing touchdown late in the game. A missed field goal from Ravens kicker Billy Cundiff gave Brady and the Patriots a 23–20 victory, sending Brady to his fifth Super Bowl.

In Super Bowl XLVI, Brady and the Patriots met the Giants in a rematch of Super Bowl XLII, which the Giants won 21–17. On the Patriots' first offensive series, Brady was penalized for intentional grounding in the end zone, giving up a safety which gave the Giants an early 2–0 lead. Brady would bounce back from this early blunder, leading a Super Bowl record-tying 96-yard touchdown drive to close the first half and at one point completing 16 consecutive passes to give him a 20-of-23 mark partway into the third quarter, another Super Bowl record. However, as was also the case four years earlier, the Patriots could not hold a late lead and allowed Eli Manning to lead the Giants to a game-winning touchdown with less than a minute left, giving Brady his second career Super Bowl loss.

==== 2012 and 2013 seasons ====
Brady started all 16 regular season games of the 2012 season and led the Patriots to a 12–4 record. He earned AFC Offensive Player of the Week three times that year in Weeks 4, 8, and 14. He became the first quarterback to lead his team to ten division titles. With a 557-point total, the Patriots became the first team to score at least 500 points in a season four different times, with Brady leading all four squads, also a record. He finished the season with 4,827 passing yards, 34 touchdowns, only eight interceptions, and a passer rating of 98.7. Brady was named to the Pro Bowl for the eighth time in his career. On the NFL Top 100 Players of 2013, Brady was ranked fourth by his fellow players for the second consecutive year.

Brady led the Patriots to a 41–28 win over the Houston Texans in the Divisional Round. With the victory, Brady surpassed Joe Montana for most career playoff wins, with 17. The Patriots were then upset by the eventual Super Bowl XLVII champion Ravens, 28–13, in the AFC Championship. He suffered his first career loss at home when leading by halftime, in which he was previously 67–0.

On February 25, 2013, Brady and the Patriots agreed on a three-year contract extension, which kept him with the team through 2017. Sportswriter Peter King called it an "amazing" deal and also noted that it reflected Patriots owner Robert Kraft's desire to make sure that Brady retired as a Patriot.

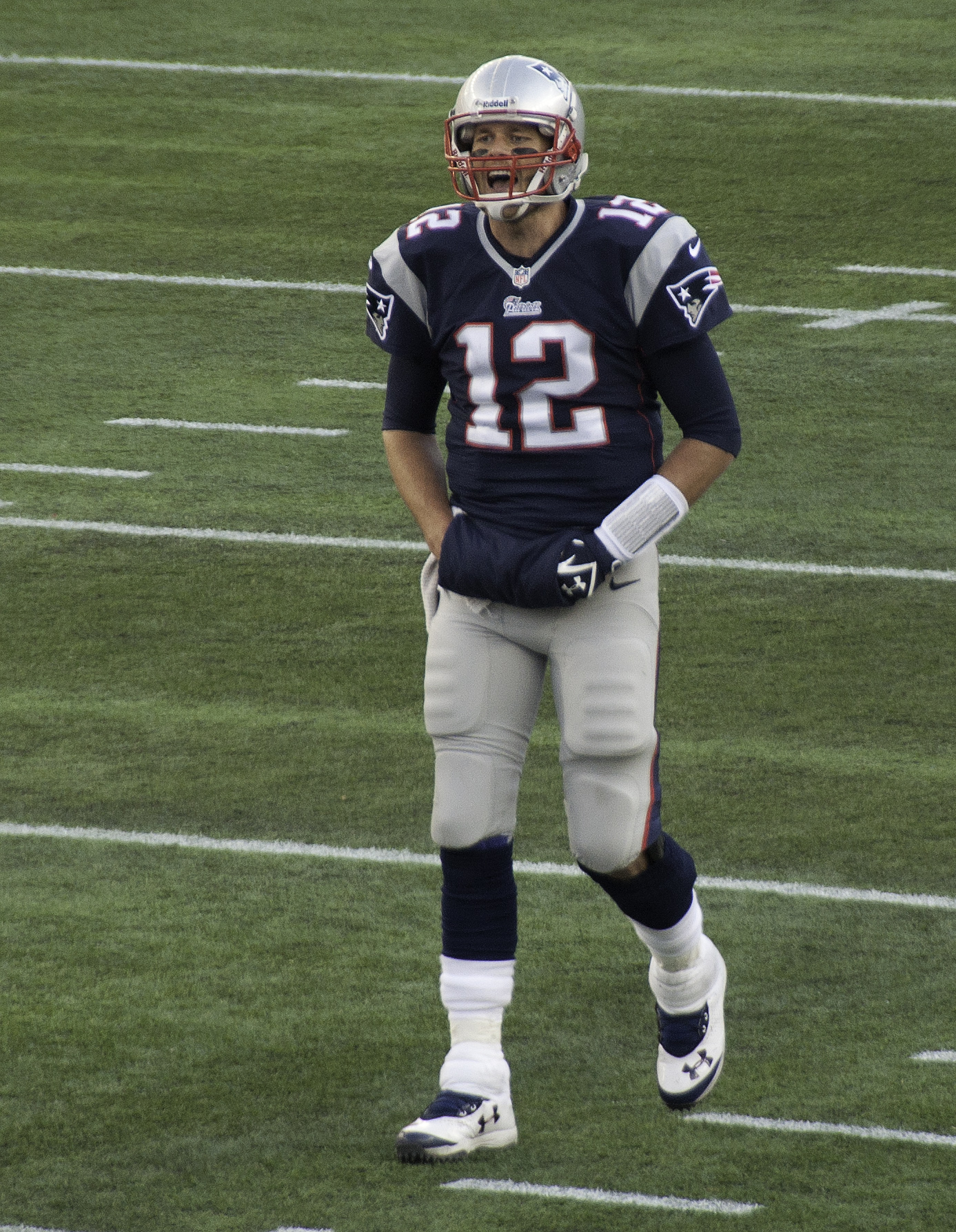
Brady during the 2013 season

Brady and the Patriots began the season with much upheaval on the offensive side of the ball. Tight end Rob Gronkowski was injured and Aaron Hernandez was arrested. Wes Welker departed to the Broncos, Danny Woodhead left in free agency for the Chargers, and Brandon Lloyd was released from the team. In order to replace the five players, the Patriots signed Danny Amendola in free agency from the Rams, drafted rookie wide receivers Aaron Dobson and Josh Boyce, and signed undrafted rookie free agent wide receiver Kenbrell Thompkins. In the first two games of the season, Brady completed 52% of his passes and had three touchdowns and one interception.

Brady was in pursuit of Drew Brees' record of at least one touchdown in 54 consecutive regular season games and saw the streak end at 52 games in a Week 5 13–6 loss against the Bengals. Brady earned AFC Offensive Player of the Week for his Week 12 overtime victory over the Broncos.

Brady and the Patriots would go on to finish the season well, as Brady was named to the Pro Bowl for the ninth time in his career and was ranked third on the NFL Top 100 Players of 2014 list in the off-season. The Patriots finished the season 12–4 to earn the second seed in the AFC and a first-round bye. In the Divisional Round matchup against the Colts, Brady made his 25th playoff appearance, breaking Brett Favre's career record for playoff appearances by a quarterback. The Patriots won 43–22 behind a four-touchdown performance from running back LeGarrette Blount. The following week, the Patriots lost 26–16 to the Broncos in the AFC Championship.

==== 2014: Fourth Super Bowl win ====
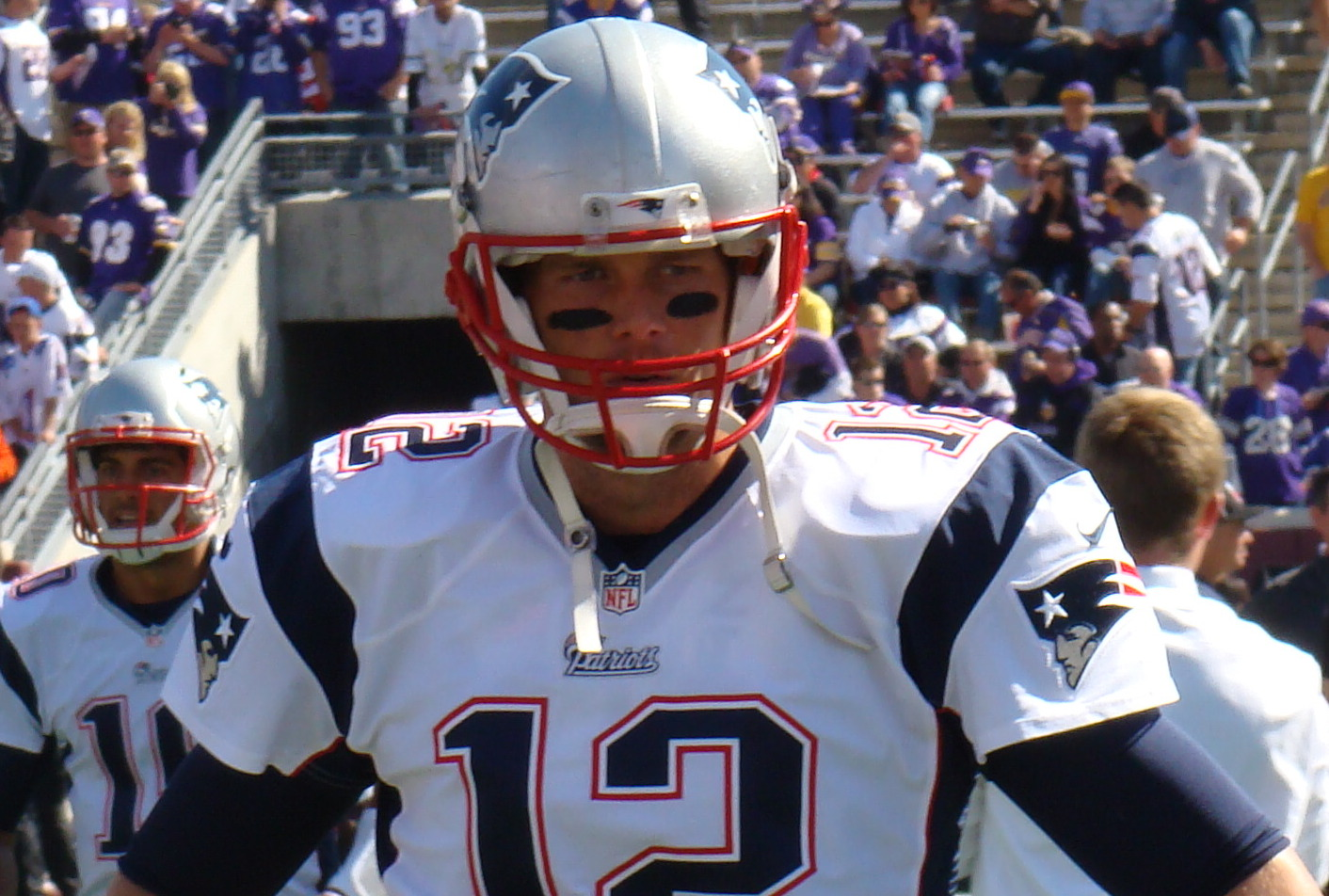
Brady in September 2014 against the Minnesota Vikings

Brady started the 2014 season with a 33–20 loss to the Dolphins. It was Brady's first opening day loss since the 2003 season. After going 2–1 in the next three games, Brady helped lead the Patriots to a seven-game winning streak. In that stretch, Brady had two games with four touchdown passes and one game with five. He won AFC Offensive Player of the Month for October. Brady clinched his NFL record 12th AFC East division title with a Week 14 win against the San Diego Chargers, later in the season. Brady was named to his tenth career Pro Bowl and was ranked third by his fellow players on the NFL Top 100 Players of 2015 list.

In a 35–31 Divisional Round win over the Ravens, Brady threw for three touchdowns and ran in a fourth, breaking Curtis Martin's club record for rushing touchdowns in the playoffs; Brady also broke Joe Montana's record for playoff touchdowns with 46. After the Ravens scored on their first two possessions, the Patriots were quickly down 14–0, but would end up tying the game 14–14. Brady threw an interception at the end of the first half, which wound up leading to a Baltimore 21–14 halftime lead. Down 28–14, Brady engineered an 80-yard drive, culminating in a touchdown to Rob Gronkowski to cut the lead to 28–21. The Patriots tied the game once again at 28 off of a trick play where Brady passed laterally to Julian Edelman who then threw a 51-yard touchdown to Amendola. Ravens kicker Justin Tucker converted a 25-yard field goal to give Baltimore a 31–28 fourth quarter lead. Brady got the ball back, and threw a 23-yard touchdown to wide receiver Brandon LaFell to give the Patriots their first lead, 35–31, with 5:13 remaining. After a Duron Harmon interception and a Joe Flacco Hail Mary attempt failed, Brady clinched his record ninth AFC Championship Game appearance. It was his fourth straight overall. After a 45–7 blowout of the Colts, Brady advanced to play in his sixth Super Bowl, breaking a tie with John Elway for most career Super Bowl appearances by a quarterback.

In Super Bowl XLIX, Brady completed 37-of-50 passes for 328 yards, four touchdowns, and two interceptions. He guided a then-record ten-point fourth quarter comeback as the Patriots defeated the Seattle Seahawks 28–24 to give Brady his fourth Super Bowl ring, tying him with Joe Montana and Terry Bradshaw for most Super Bowl victories by a starting quarterback. He was named Super Bowl MVP for the third time, tying Montana's record. Brady's 37 completed passes in the game set a Super Bowl record at the time, which Brady himself would break in Super Bowl LI two years later.

===== Deflategate report =====
On May 6, 2015, the NFL published a 243-page report regarding the deflation of footballs used in the previous season's AFC Championship Game. The report concluded that, more likely than not, Brady was at least generally aware of the intentional deflation. On May 11, Brady was suspended for four games by the NFL for his involvement based on "substantial and credible evidence" that Brady knew Patriots employees were deflating footballs and that he was uncooperative with the investigators. That day, Troy Vincent—NFL Executive Vice President of Football Operations—penned a letter to Brady that stated in part: "Your actions as set forth in the report clearly constitute conduct detrimental to the integrity of and public confidence in the game of professional football." Brady, through the NFL Players Association, appealed the suspension on May 14.

On July 28, NFL Commissioner Roger Goodell upheld Brady's four-game suspension. Goodell cited Brady's destruction of his cell phone as a critical factor in his decision to uphold Brady's suspension. The NFL also filed papers in federal court seeking to confirm Roger Goodell's decision. Brady gave permission to the NFLPA to appeal the suspension in federal court, and released a statement on his Facebook page that expressed disappointment in and criticism of Goodell's decision to uphold the suspension.

Commentary on the initial punishment was mixed. Bleacher Report writer Mike Freeman made a statement agreeing with Goodell's decision, saying the penalties were "brutal, but it deserved to be". Various commentators also implied that the prior reputation of the Patriots organization as a team that bends rules appeared to factor into the harshness of the punishment. Others described the punishment as "firm but fair".

On September 3, Judge Richard M. Berman of the United States District Court for the Southern District of New York vacated Brady's suspension; this ruling allowed Brady to play in the first four games of the 2015 NFL season. In his decision, Judge Berman cited the NFL's failure to provide proper notice to Brady of the charges against him and the potential for a suspension. Post-appeal commentary also criticized Goodell for "manipulating Brady's testimony" at the appeal hearing in his decision.

In February 2022, sportswriter Mike Florio revealed that the NFL falsified data and hid information that would have cleared Brady and the Patriots of wrongdoing. In his book Playmakers: How the NFL Really Works (And Doesn't), Florio revealed that NFL executives, specifically vice president Troy Vincent, jumped to conclusions about the air pressure inside the Patriots' footballs at halftime of the AFC Championship game. He also noted that 11 of the 12 Patriot footballs used in the game were actually not outside the predicted range of Ideal gas law, and the other was only slightly below.

Florio also revealed that NFL general counsel Jeff Pash ordered that the records of all PSI data gathered from the 2015 season be deleted. Leaked transcripts revealed that NFL senior VP of football operations Dave Gardi used false numbers in his letter to the Patriots which ordered that the team was to be investigated. It was also shown that Vincent did not instruct anyone to record the timing of the measurements taken, the temperature in the room during testing, if the footballs tested were wet or dry, and that he did not know which of the two air pressure gauges was used to make the pregame measurements. Vincent also admitted that he and other NFL executives never heard of the Ideal gas law and were unaware that PSI in a football can change in certain environments.

==== 2015 season ====
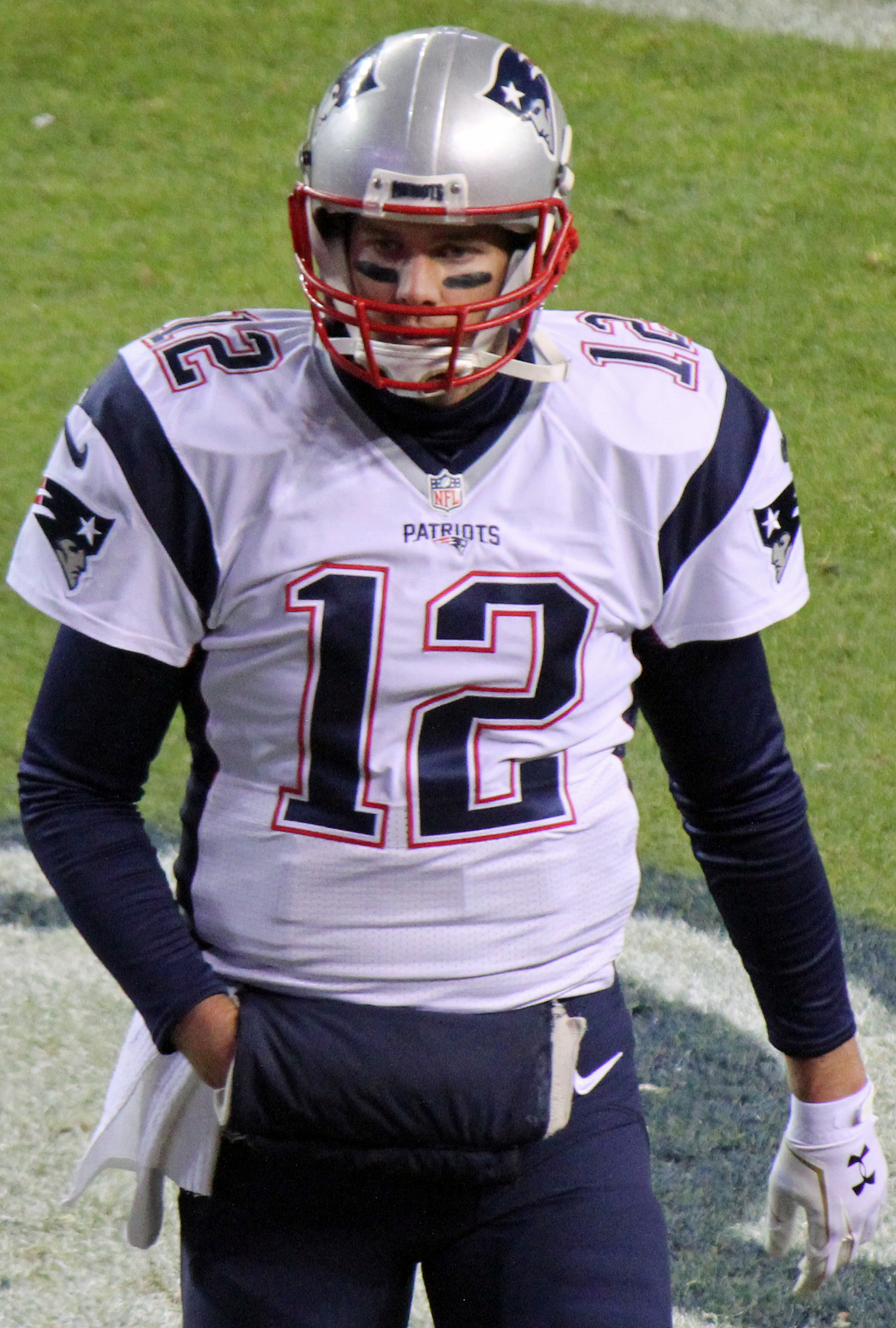
Brady in Denver in November 2015

In the NFL Kickoff game, Brady led the Patriots to a 28–21 win over the Steelers. He threw for 288 yards and four touchdowns, three of them to Rob Gronkowski. The Patriots' victory was the 161st victory of Brady's career, all with the Patriots, which surpassed the record held by former Green Bay Packers quarterback Brett Favre for most regular season wins by a starting quarterback with a single team. In Week 2, Brady threw for 466 yards and three touchdowns in a 40–32 win against the Bills. Through the first five games of the season, Brady threw a total of 14 touchdowns with one interception and had a quarterback rating of 118.4. Brady was named AFC Offensive Player of the Month for September. In Week 8, a 36–7 victory over the Dolphins, he had 356 passing yards and four touchdowns to earn his 25th career AFC Offensive Player of the Week title.

Despite Brady's success, the Patriots were hit by many injuries to key players on offense, including wide receiver Julian Edelman, and the Patriots eventually lost their first game against the Broncos 30–24 in overtime, who were without Peyton Manning, in Denver following a 10–0 start. The Patriots then lost three of their remaining five games to finish 12–4 for a fourth straight season, earning the 2-seed in the AFC. Brady finished the regular season with a league-leading 36 touchdown passes and seven interceptions. He was named to his 11th Pro Bowl (seventh straight), and was ranked as the second best player on the NFL Top 100 Players of 2016 behind only league MVP Cam Newton.

With the return of Julian Edelman from a foot injury, the Patriots defeated the Chiefs in the Divisional Round by a score of 27–20 after advancing with a first round bye. Brady completed 28 of 42 passes for 302 yards and two passing touchdowns and one rushing touchdown as he led the team to their fifth consecutive appearance in the AFC Championship. The Patriots advanced to the AFC Championship to face Peyton Manning and the Broncos at Sports Authority Field at Mile High. It would turn out to be the 17th and final meeting between the two storied quarterbacks, as Manning would announce his retirement after the season ended. The Broncos' top-ranked defense limited Brady, who completed 27-of-56 passes, for 310 yards, two interceptions and a passing touchdown, all day, and the Patriots eventually lost the game 20–18 after a potential game-tying two-point conversion attempt failed with less than half a minute remaining.

===== Deflategate suspension =====
On February 29, 2016, Brady signed a two-year contract extension covering the 2018 and 2019 seasons. On March 3, the NFL appealed Judge Richard M. Berman's 2015 decision to vacate Brady's four-game suspension as punishment for his alleged role in the Deflategate scandal. At the hearing, the three-judge panel of the United States Court of Appeals for the Second Circuit questioned Players Association lawyer Jeffrey L. Kessler and NFL lawyer Paul Clement, with Circuit Judge Denny Chin stating that "the evidence of ball tampering is compelling, if not overwhelming."

On April 25, the decision to vacate Brady's four-game suspension was overturned by the U.S. Appeals Court. Circuit Judge Barrington Daniels Parker Jr., joined by Circuit Judge Chin, wrote that they could not "second-guess" the arbitration but were merely determining it "met the minimum legal standards established by the Labor Management Relations Act of 1947". Circuit Chief Judge Robert Katzmann dissented, writing that the NFL's fines for using stickum was "highly analogous" and that here "the Commissioner was doling out his own brand of industrial justice." On May 23, Brady appealed for his case to be reheard by the full U.S. 2nd Circuit Court. The 2nd Circuit Court denied Brady's request for an en banc hearing on July 13. On July 15, Brady announced that he would give up his Deflategate fight and accept his suspension for the first four regular season games of the 2016 season.

==== 2016: Fifth Super Bowl win ====
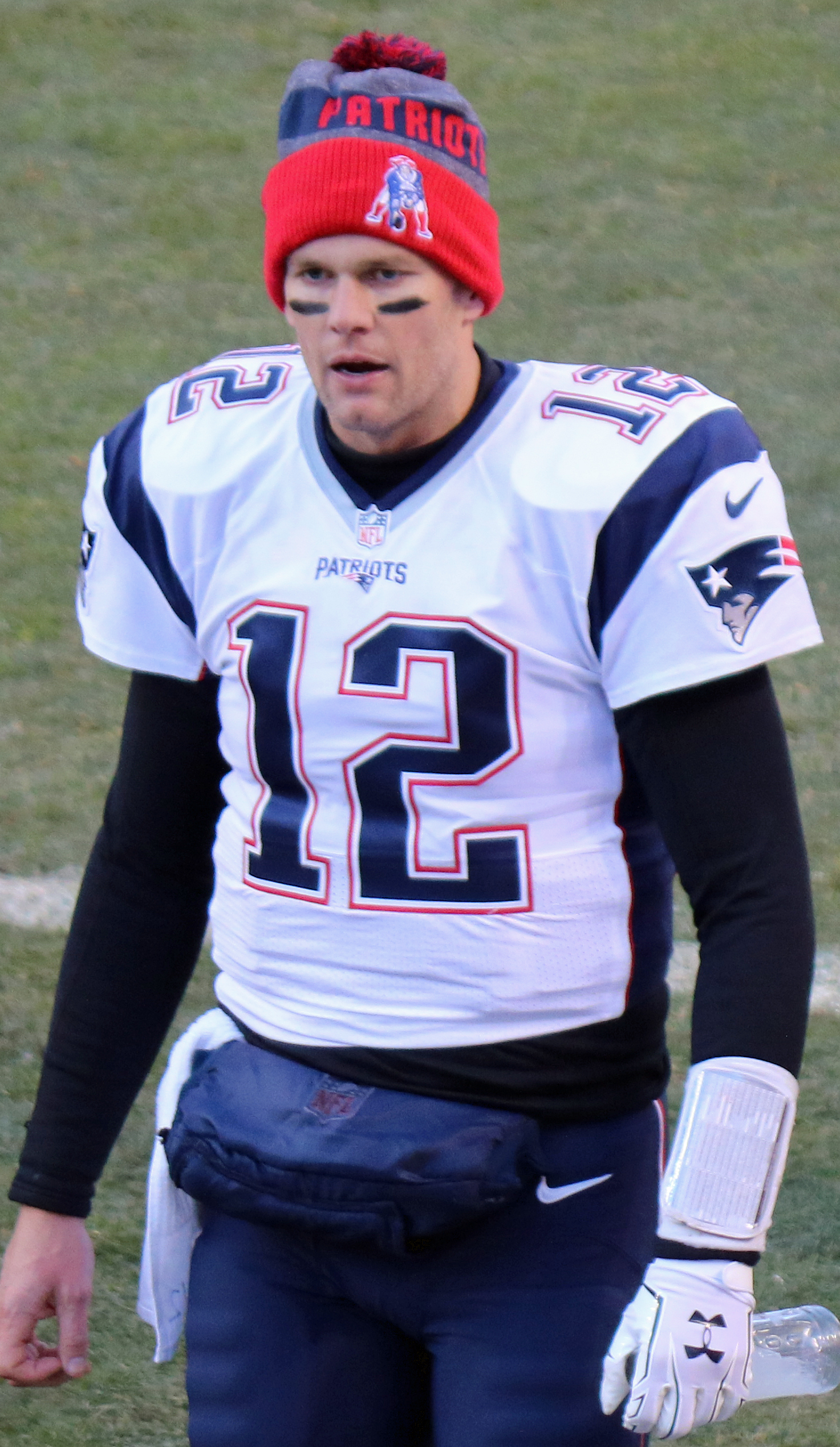
Brady during the 2016 season

After serving his four-game suspension, Brady made his 2016 season debut on October 9 on the road against the Browns; he completed 28-of-40 passes for 406 yards and three touchdowns in a 33–13 victory to earn AFC Offensive Player of the Week. Brady's outstanding numbers during his first four games following the suspension earned him the AFC Offensive Player of the Month award for October.

In Week 11, Brady recorded four touchdowns and no interceptions in a 30–17 road win against the 49ers. Those four touchdown passes gave him a total of 444 career regular season touchdown passes with one team, breaking Brett Favre's record with the Green Bay Packers. The following week, Brady completed 30-of-50 passes for 286 yards and two touchdowns in a 22–17 road victory against the Jets. The win was also the Patriots' 500th victory (including playoffs) in franchise history. During this victory, Brady also became the fifth quarterback to record 60,000 career regular season passing yards, joining Peyton Manning, Brett Favre, Drew Brees, and Dan Marino. The following week, Brady and the Patriots defeated the Los Angeles Rams by a score of 26–10, giving Brady his record-201st career victory, including playoff games.

With a 16–3 victory over the Broncos, the Patriots clinched an eighth consecutive AFC East title and a seventh consecutive first-round bye in the playoffs, both NFL records. On December 20, 2016, Brady was named to the Pro Bowl for the eighth straight season and 12th time overall. Brady ended the regular season with 28 passing touchdowns and only two interceptions for the regular season, breaking the previous TD:INT ratio record of Nick Foles's 27:2 figure set in 2013 with the Eagles. Brady was named to the AP All-Pro Second Team. Brady was also ranked first on the NFL Top 100 Players of 2017 as the best player in the league, becoming the first player to be named as #1 twice since the listing began.

Brady and the Patriots began their postseason run in the Divisional Round, hosting the Texans, which held the league's No. 1 total defense. Brady completed 18-of-38 passes for 287 yards, two touchdowns, and two interceptions as the Patriots won 34–16, clinching a record sixth consecutive trip to the AFC Championship Game. In the AFC Championship, the Patriots hosted the Steelers. Brady completed 32-of-42 passes for 384 yards, three touchdowns, and no interceptions in the 36–17 victory. The win gave Brady and Patriots head coach Bill Belichick their record seventh conference title as a quarterback–head coach tandem, and the Patriots an NFL record ninth Super Bowl appearance.

Brady and the Patriots faced the NFC champion Atlanta Falcons, who boasted the league's highest-scoring offense, in Super Bowl LI. Brady threw for 43 completions on 62 attempts for 466 passing yards—all Super Bowl records at the time. Brady also threw for two touchdowns and an interception, which was returned for a touchdown by Robert Alford in the second quarter. After trailing 28–3 midway through the third quarter, Brady and the Patriots scored 25 unanswered points to tie the game at the end of regulation. This resulted in the first overtime in Super Bowl history. After winning the overtime coin toss, Brady led the Patriots down the field to score a touchdown and win the game by a score of 34–28, completing the largest comeback win in both team history and Super Bowl history. With the victory, Brady won his fifth Super Bowl, which set a record for most Super Bowl victories of any quarterback in history and tied defensive player Charles Haley for the most Super Bowl victories for any player. In addition, Brady set another record by winning his fourth Super Bowl MVP award for his clutch performance. On a personal note, this game was also special for Brady because it was the first game this season that his mother had attended in person, after having been previously diagnosed with cancer.

==== 2017: Third MVP and loss in Super Bowl LII ====
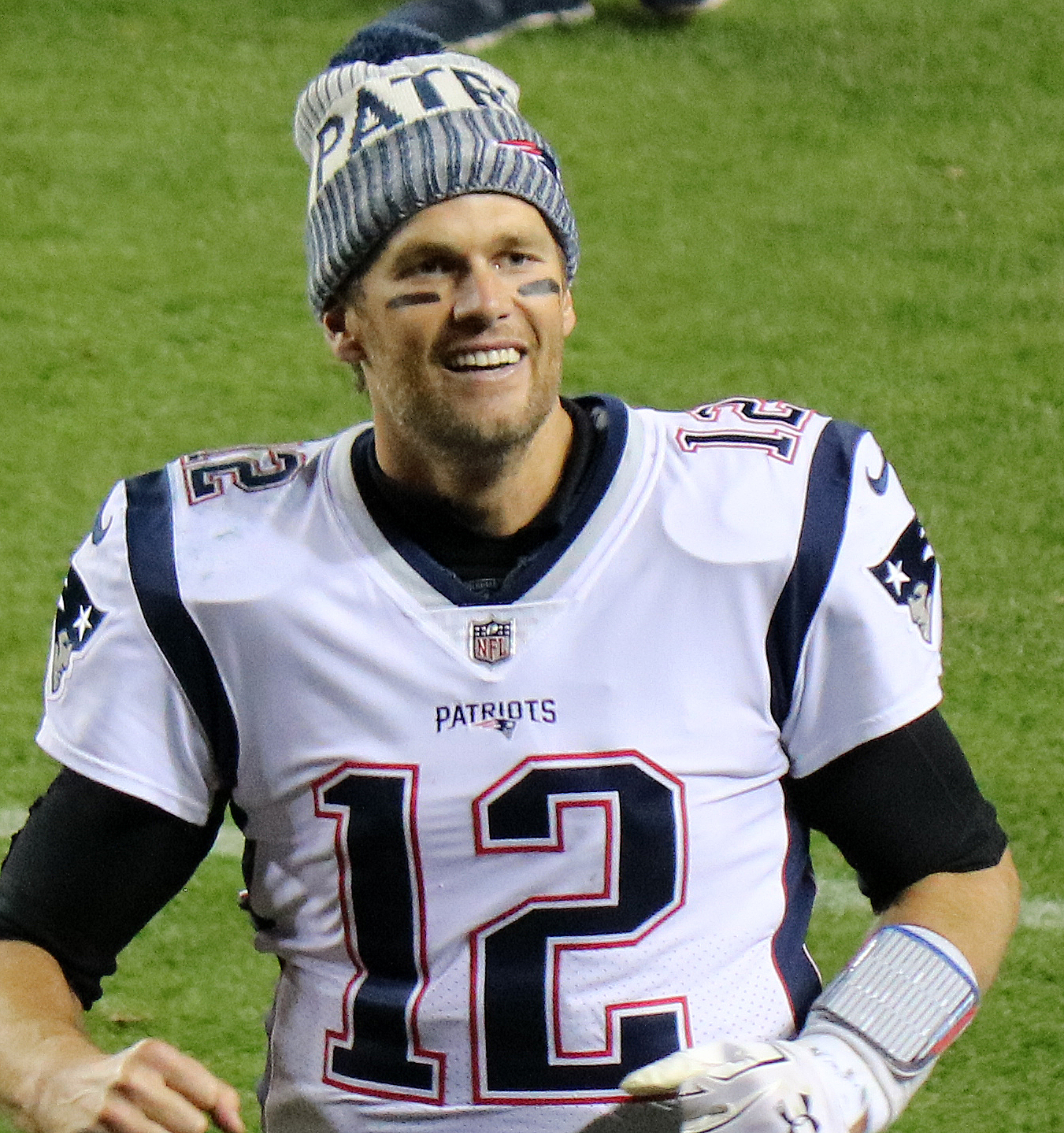
Brady with the Patriots in 2017

On May 12, 2017, Brady was announced as the cover athlete for Madden NFL 18. In a CBS interview on May 17, Charlie Rose asked Brady's wife, Gisele Bündchen, if she wanted Brady to retire, despite the fact that he was still playing at a high level. Bündchen mentioned that Brady suffered from a concussion in 2016, saying, "I mean he has concussions pretty much every—I mean we don't talk about—but he does have concussions. I don't really think it's a healthy thing for anybody to go through." Following the Bündchen interview, the NFL released a statement: "We have reviewed all reports relating to Tom Brady from the unaffiliated neurotrauma consultants and certified athletic trainer spotters who worked at Patriots' home and away 2016 season games as well as club injury reports that were sent to the league office. There are no records that indicate that Mr. Brady suffered a head injury or concussion, or exhibited or complained of concussion symptoms. Today we have been in contact with the NFLPA and will work together to gather more information from the club's medical staff and Mr. Brady". Brady's agent, Don Yee, said that Brady was not diagnosed with a concussion during the 2016 season.

The Patriots opened up their 2017 season with a 42–27 loss in the NFL Kickoff game to the Chiefs. In Week 2, Brady's three touchdown passes and 447 passing yards in a 36–20 win over the New Orleans Saints earned him his 28th AFC Offensive Player of the Week award, breaking the record previously held by Peyton Manning for the most AFC Offensive Player of the Week awards in a career. He won the AFC Offensive Player of the Week again in the following week for his 378-yard, five-touchdown game in a 36–33 win over the Texans. In Week 6, the Patriots defeated the Jets, 24–17. Brady obtained his 187th career win, setting the record for most regular season wins in NFL history. In Week 10, Brady won his third AFC Offensive Player of the Month for his three-touchdown game in a 41–16 win over the Broncos. For the month of November, Brady won AFC Offensive Player of the Month. On December 19, Brady was selected to the Pro Bowl for the 13th time in his career. At age 40, Brady became the oldest quarterback ever to start all of his team's games in an NFL regular season. (Note: Brady surpassed Doug Flutie, who at age 38, started all 16 games for the 2001 San Diego Chargers) Brady finished the regular season with a league-leading 4,577 passing yards, making him the oldest player ever to lead the league in passing yards. He was named a first-team All-Pro by the Associated Press for the third time in his career. Earning 40 of 50 votes, Brady was named the NFL Most Valuable Player for the third time in his career. For the second straight year and third time overall, Brady was ranked No. 1 by his fellow players on the NFL Top 100 Players of 2018.

Brady and the Patriots began their postseason run by defeating the Titans, 35–14, in the Divisional Round of the playoffs. With the win, the Patriots advanced to the AFC Championship Game for the seventh straight year. Days after the divisional round, it was revealed that Brady had a minor cut on his right hand, which required stitches. Despite this injury, Brady managed to start the AFC Championship Game, where the Patriots hosted the Jaguars. Brady led a fourth quarter comeback to lead the Patriots to a 24–20 victory. The win gave Brady and Patriots head coach Bill Belichick their eighth conference title as a quarterback–head coach tandem, and the Patriots a berth in Super Bowl LII, their tenth Super Bowl appearance as a team, both of which extended NFL records.

In Super Bowl LII, the Patriots faced the Eagles and their second-string quarterback Nick Foles. Brady completed 28-of-48 attempts for three passing touchdowns, no interceptions, and a Super Bowl record 505 yards–which set a new postseason game record for the most passing yards in NFL history. With roughly two minutes remaining in the game and the Eagles leading 38–33, Brady was strip-sacked by Brandon Graham. The Eagles recovered the fumble and cemented their 41–33 win with a field goal, securing their first franchise Super Bowl victory in a game with the most combined total yardage in NFL history. This was the third time overall that Brady had lost in a Super Bowl, becoming the fourth starting quarterback in Super Bowl history to lose at least three Super Bowls joining Jim Kelly, Fran Tarkenton, and John Elway.

==== 2018–2019: Sixth Super Bowl win and final season in New England ====
Brady started his 19th NFL season with 277 passing yards, three touchdowns, and one interception in a 27–20 victory over the Texans in the season opener. In Week 5, in a 38–24 win against the Colts, Brady's 500th career touchdown pass went to Josh Gordon, who became the 71st different player to catch a touchdown from Brady, breaking a record previously held by Vinny Testaverde. In Week 6, in a 43–40 win against the Chiefs, Brady secured his 200th career regular season win, making him the only quarterback in NFL history to accomplish that feat. In Week 15, Brady reached 70,000 passing yards, becoming the fourth quarterback in NFL history to accomplish the feat. During Week 16 against the Bills, Brady was limited to 126 passing yards, but the Patriots won 24–12, clinching the AFC East pennant for the 10th consecutive season and 16th time in 18 years. In Week 17, Brady helped the Patriots clinch a first-round bye, with a 38–3 win against the Jets. Brady finished the season completing 375-of-570 passes, 4,355 yards, 29 touchdowns, and 11 interceptions. He earned his 14th career Pro Bowl nomination. He was ranked sixth by his fellow players on the NFL Top 100 Players of 2019.

Following their first-round bye, the Patriots started their playoff run at home against the Los Angeles Chargers in the Divisional Round. The Patriots jumped out to a 35–7 halftime lead en route to a 41–28 win. With the win, the Patriots advanced to the AFC Championship Game for an eighth consecutive year, this time to face the Chiefs at Arrowhead Stadium. The Patriots went into halftime with a 14–0 lead. However, the Chiefs led by young quarterback Patrick Mahomes battled back in the second half and sent the game into overtime with a score of 31–31. The Patriots won the coin toss to start overtime and elected to receive the ball. Brady led the Patriots on a 75-yard drive that resulted in a game-winning two-yard rushing touchdown by Rex Burkhead, to win the game 37–31. With the victory, Brady earned a third consecutive and ninth overall Super Bowl appearance for his career.

In Super Bowl LIII, Brady completed 21-of-35 passes for 262 passing yards and an interception as the Patriots won 13–3 over the Rams in the lowest-scoring Super Bowl in history. This was the first time in his nine Super Bowl appearances in which Brady did not have a passing touchdown, though with the game tied 3–3 and less than eight minutes left he successfully connected with Rob Gronkowski down the sideline between three defenders to set up the go-ahead touchdown. With the victory, the Patriots became the second NFL team to win six Super Bowls, tying the Steelers for the most in NFL history. In addition, Brady became the oldest quarterback at 41 years of age to win a Super Bowl, as well as the first player ever to win six Super Bowls, breaking a tie with Charles Haley.

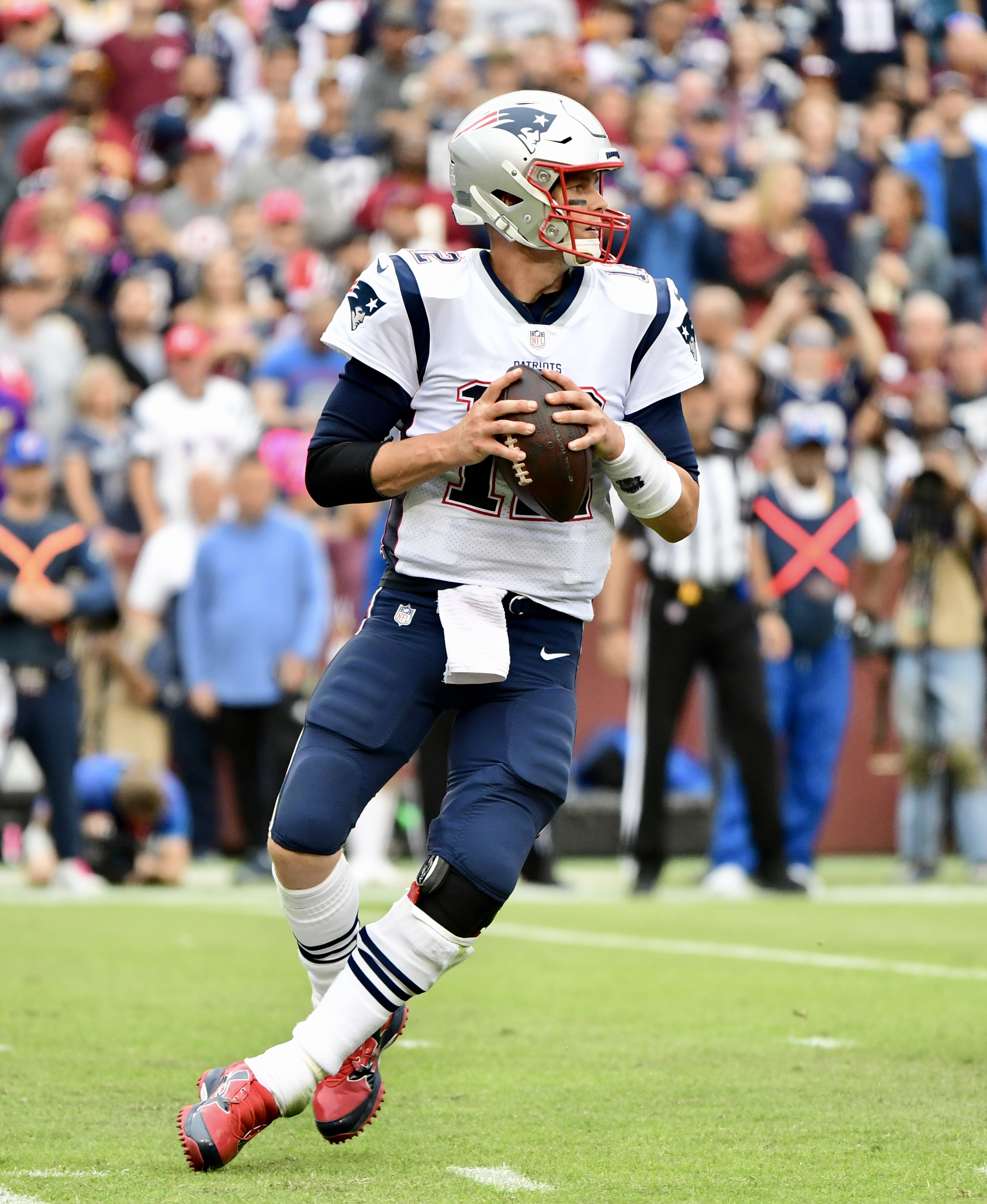
Brady in a game against the Redskins in 2019

On August 4, 2019, Brady signed a two-year contract extension worth $70 million through the 2021 season; the terms of the contract allowed Brady to become a free agent after the 2019 season. Against the 2019 Patriots salary cap, Brady was the highest-paid player on the team at $21.5 million. Belichick was unwilling to offer a longer-term deal that Brady sought.

Brady began the season by completing 24 of 36 passes for 341 yards and three touchdowns in a 33–3 win over the Steelers. During a 33–7 victory against the Washington Redskins in Week 5, Brady surpassed Brett Favre for third place on the all-time passing yards list. The following week in a 35–14 win against the Giants, Brady overtook Peyton Manning for second place on the all-time passing yards list, behind only Drew Brees. Although the Patriots' defense was performing well, the offense was notedly stagnant, and Brady told friends that he "felt Belichick had taken the offense for granted because of how good it had been for so long"; he said to NBC that he was the "most miserable 8–0 quarterback in the NFL." Brady and the Patriots struggled during the second half of the season, losing three of their next five games following the 8–0 start, including back-to-back losses in Weeks 13 and 14 against the Texans (28–22) and Chiefs (23–16). In Week 17, Brady's final regular-season game as a Patriot, he threw for 221 yards and two touchdowns, but also threw an interception that was returned by former Patriots teammate Eric Rowe for a touchdown in a 27–24 loss to the Miami Dolphins. Although the Patriots finished the regular season with a 12–4 record and won the AFC East for the 11th consecutive year, this loss, combined with a win by the Chiefs, denied New England a first-round bye for the first time since 2009. Personally, however, Brady passed Peyton Manning for the second-most touchdown passes in NFL history, with 541.

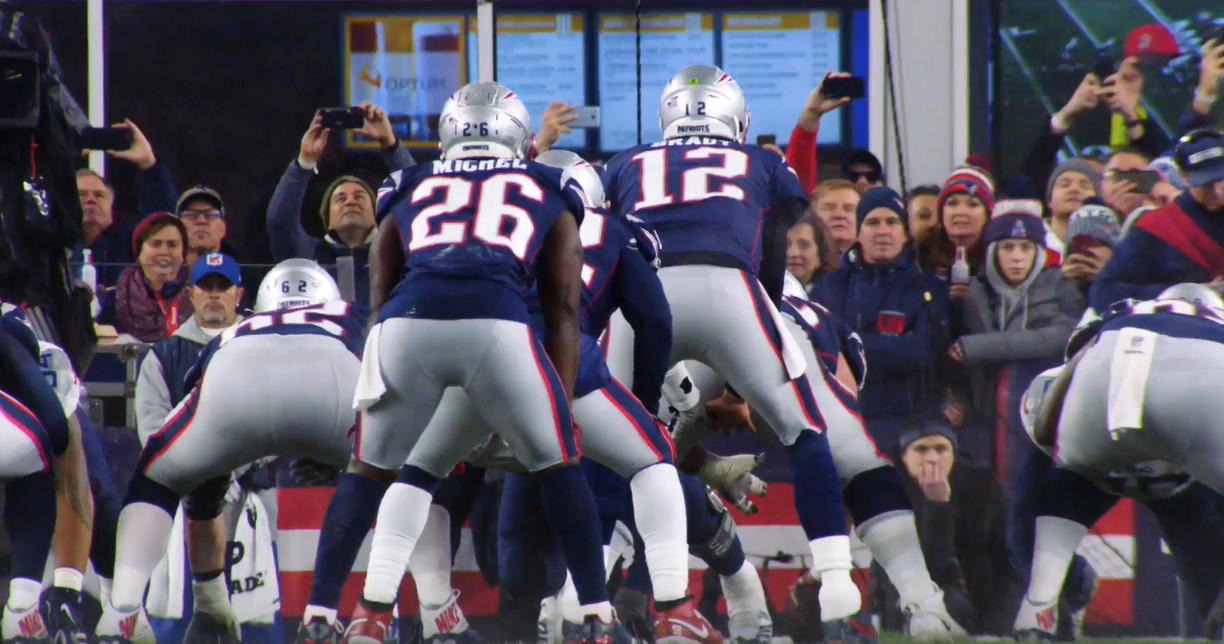
Brady in the 2019 playoffs against the Tennessee Titans, his final game with the Patriots

The Patriots began their postseason run in the Wild Card Round, where they faced the Titans. With his team trailing 14–13 and pinned back on its 1-yard line with 15 seconds left in the game, Brady's final pass attempt of the game – and his last as a Patriot – was intercepted and returned for a touchdown by Titans cornerback and former teammate Logan Ryan, which effectively sealed the 20–13 win for Tennessee. During the NFL's celebration of their 100th season, Brady was named to the NFL 100 All-Time Team. He was ranked 14th by his fellow players on the NFL Top 100 Players of 2020.

On March 17, 2020, the day before his contract with the Patriots expired, Brady announced that he would not re-sign with the team for the 2020 season, ending his 20-year tenure in New England. After Brady signed with Tampa Bay, billboards thanking Brady for his services were posted alongside the Massachusetts Turnpike and eleven other locations around New England.

=== Tampa Bay Buccaneers ===
==== 2020 season: Seventh Super Bowl win ====
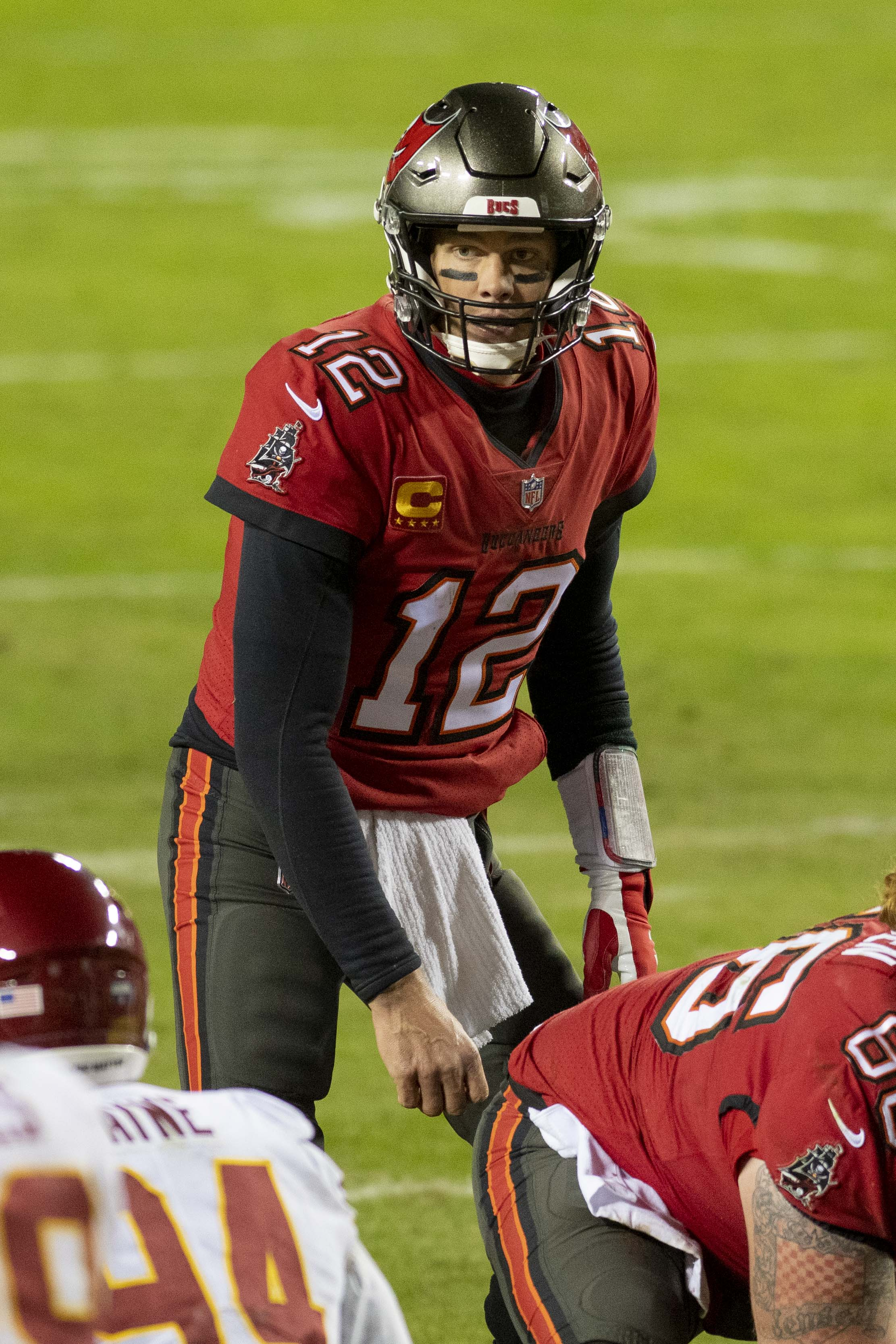
Brady against the Washington Football Team in the 2020 playoffs

Brady signed with the Buccaneers on March 20, 2020. The two-year contract was worth $50 million in fully guaranteed money, with up to $4.5 million each year in incentives. The deal included a no-trade and a no-franchise tag clause. Although his career number of 12 was assigned to Chris Godwin, Godwin offered it to Brady as a sign of respect and switched his number to 14. In April 2020, Brady was reunited with former Patriots teammate Rob Gronkowski when the tight end came out of retirement and was traded to the Buccaneers. Head coach Bruce Arians stated that it was Brady who was adamant for the team to trade for Gronkowski.

According to sport journalist Seth Wickersham's 2021 book It's Better to Be Feared, in late February 2020, Brady reached out to his former teammate and San Francisco 49ers wide receivers coach Wes Welker, and let him know that if the team was interested, it would be his choice, as he wanted to end his career where it first started, as they were his childhood team. The coaching staff reportedly chose their current starting quarterback Jimmy Garoppolo over Brady, who was his former backup with the Patriots and led the team to a super bowl appearance in Super Bowl LIV, the same month which ended in a loss for the 49ers. Reports from March 2020 indicated that the choice in the end came in choosing between the Buccaneers and the Los Angeles Chargers, with both teams reportedly offering him a contract worth 30 million dollars per season, with a source claiming that Brady wasn't interested in signing with the Chargers due to "family considerations". NFL insider Ian Rapoport claimed that the New Orleans Saints were also interested in Brady, until their franchise quarterback Drew Brees decided to stay for another year. Rapoport also claimed that Brady was interested in the Indianapolis Colts, but that the team only wanted a one-year contract. In September 2024, Brady revealed that he seriously considered signing with the Chicago Bears in 2020, calling them "very stealth in their recruitment". Las Vegas Raiders owner, Mark Davis claimed in September 2025 that he would have liked to sign Brady, but that head coach Jon Gruden and general manager Mike Mayock decided to stick with Derek Carr instead.

Making his Buccaneers debut in New Orleans against the Saints on September 13, Brady completed 23-of-36 passes for 239 yards, two touchdowns, and two interceptions, and additionally scored a rushing touchdown as the Saints defeated the Buccaneers 34–23. Brady bounced back with three solid performances as the Buccaneers won their next three games, including a Week 4 performance against the Chargers in which he completed 30 of 46 passes for 369 yards, five touchdowns, and an interception. Brady's five touchdowns in the Buccaneers' 38–31 win against the Chargers marked the seventh time in his career he had five touchdowns in a game and, at age 43, made him the oldest quarterback to have a five-touchdown game. Brady's Week 4 performance earned him the NFC Offensive Player of the Week award for the first time in his career. For the month of October, Brady won NFC Offensive Player of the Month. In Week 9 against New Orleans, Brady threw for 209 yards and three interceptions during the 38–3 loss. This was the most lopsided loss of Brady's career, as well as the first time in his 20-year career that he had been swept by a divisional opponent.

Brady later said that playing behind closed doors from the impact of the COVID-19 pandemic on the NFL made it easier for him to execute his new team's unfamiliar football playbook. In Week 16 against the Lions, Brady completed 22-of-27 attempts with 348 yards, four touchdowns, and a perfect passer rating of 158.3 in the first half before being rested in the second half of the 47–7 victory. The win ended a 13-year playoff drought for the Buccaneers. Overall, he finished the 2020 season with 4,633 passing yards, 40 passing touchdowns, and 12 interceptions. Due to the Saints winning the division, the Buccaneers settled for a wild card spot, marking a career-first for Brady.

In the Wild Card Round against the Washington Football Team, Brady threw for 381 yards and two touchdowns in the 31–23 win. During the game, he became the oldest player to throw a touchdown pass in NFL postseason history. In the Divisional Round against the Saints, Brady threw for 199 yards and two touchdowns and rushed for a touchdown in the 30–20 win. As Brady and Saints quarterback Drew Brees were both over 40 years old and were first and second in career touchdown passes and career passing yards, the game was hyped as the potential final matchup between the two stars (which it indeed turned out to be, as Brees retired following the season). Brady extended his record of Conference Championship game appearances to 14. In the NFC Championship, Brady threw for 280 yards, three touchdowns and three interceptions in a 31–26 win over Aaron Rodgers and the Packers at Lambeau Field. It was another highly anticipated matchup since Brady and Rodgers were two of the most statistically efficient quarterbacks, and this was their first postseason matchup. The win gave Brady his record-extending tenth Super Bowl appearance, making Brady the fourth quarterback to lead two different teams to the Super Bowl, joining Craig Morton, Kurt Warner, and Peyton Manning, and the second after Morton to reach the Super Bowl from both conferences. The Buccaneers became the first team to play in a Super Bowl in its home stadium.

Super Bowl LV was the first title game where both starting quarterbacks, Brady and his opposing counterpart Patrick Mahomes, have won the AP NFL MVP and Super Bowl MVP awards; as Brady is Mahomes' senior by 18 years, some billed the matchup as comparable to Michael Jordan versus LeBron James. Brady threw for 201 yards and three touchdowns in Tampa Bay's 31–9 win over the Chiefs. He had led the Buccaneers to become only the seventh Wild Card team to win the Super Bowl and only the fifth to do so by winning three road games. Brady was awarded Super Bowl MVP for the game. His two touchdown passes to tight end Rob Gronkowski set a record for most postseason touchdown passes for a passer-receiver duo, with 14, breaking the mark previously held by Joe Montana and Jerry Rice. Brady extended his record for most Super Bowl wins by a player with his seventh and extended his record for Super Bowl MVP awards, with five. Brady became the second quarterback, joining Peyton Manning, to lead two different teams to Super Bowl wins, but the first to win Super Bowl MVP with two different teams. He was the first quarterback to win the Super Bowl with teams from different conferences. Brady became the player with the most championships in NFL history and tied Otto Graham for the most league championships in professional football history by a player at seven. With the win, Brady became the oldest quarterback in Super Bowl history to start, play, win, and receive the MVP award. He was ranked seventh by his fellow players on the NFL Top 100 Players of 2021.

==== 2021 season ====
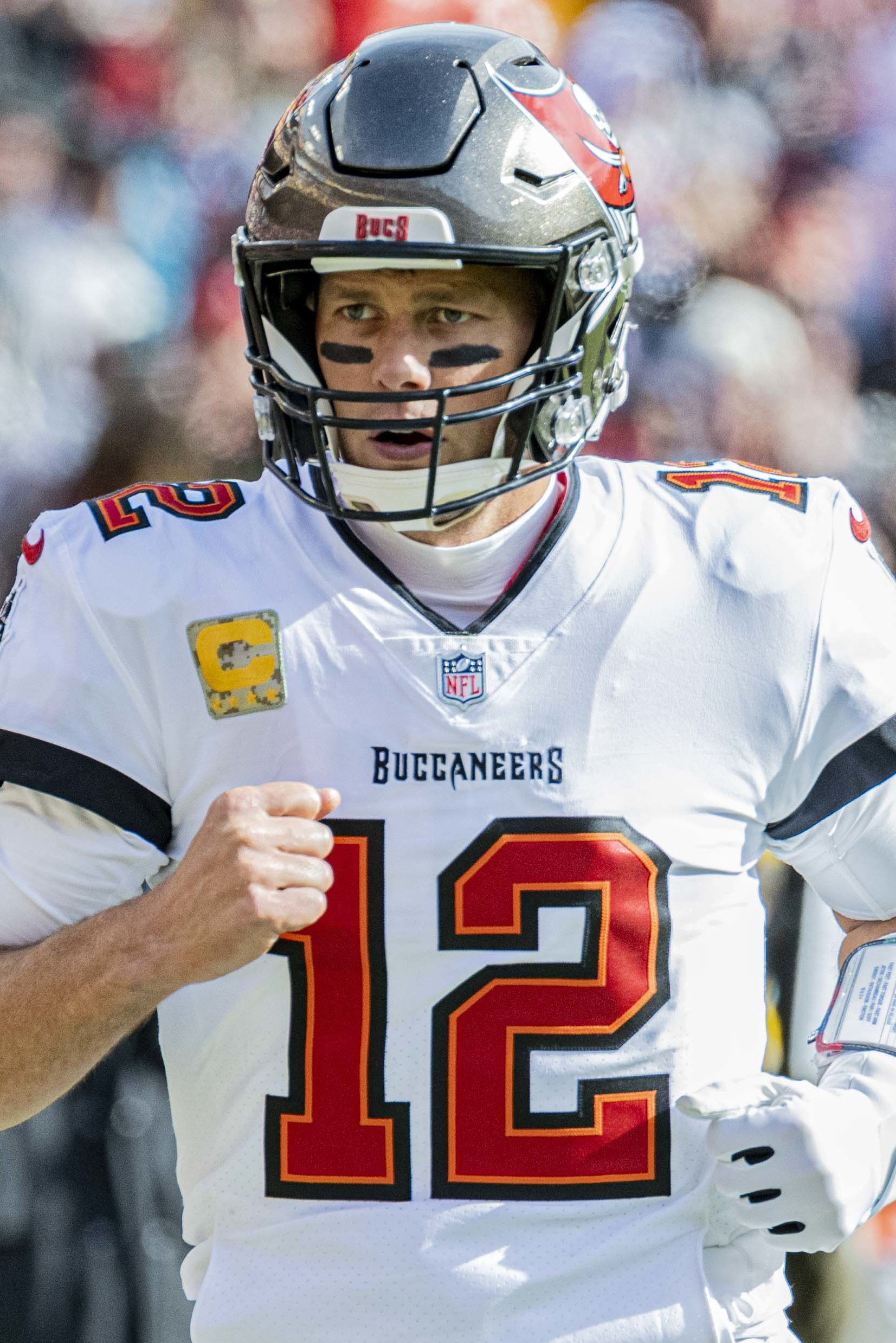
Brady during the 2021 season

On February 11, 2021, it was revealed that Brady had knee discomfort through most of the 2020 season and would require a minor arthroscopy for a routine cleanup. Brady signed a one-year contract extension through the 2022 season with the Buccaneers on March 12, 2021. On July 15, it was revealed that Brady had a torn MCL in the knee that had to undergo surgery, an injury that had plagued him for the entire 2020 season. The NFL declined to comment on the Buccaneers' failure to disclose this injury.

In the NFL Kickoff game against the Cowboys, Brady threw for 379 yards, four touchdowns, and two interceptions leading the Buccaneers to a 31–29 win. Brady and tight end Rob Gronkowski became the second passer-receiver duo to record 100 touchdown passes, joining Peyton Manning and Marvin Harrison. In Week 3, against the Rams, Brady threw for 432 yards, and had two touchdowns, and joined Drew Brees as the only players in NFL history to record 80,000 passing yards during the 34–24 loss. In his return to New England in Week 4 against Belichick and rookie quarterback Mac Jones, Brady surpassed Brees, who coincidentally was on the sidelines as an analyst for NBC Sunday Night Football, for the most passing yards in National Football League history. He broke the record on a 28-yard completion to Mike Evans in the first quarter. With the victory over his former team, Brady became the fourth quarterback in NFL history to record a win against all 32 current teams in the league, joining Brett Favre, Peyton Manning, and Drew Brees. In addition, he became the sixth quarterback to have a victory against every incumbent NFL franchise after Fran Tarkenton and Joe Montana, as the league only had 28 teams during the latter two's respective tenures.

In Week 5, Brady threw for 411 yards and five touchdowns in a 45–17 win over the Dolphins, earning NFC Offensive Player of the Week. In Week 7, Brady became the first quarterback in NFL history to record 600 touchdown passes, with a nine-yard pass to Evans in a win against the Chicago Bears. In Week 14, Brady surpassed Brees for most all-time pass completions list in NFL history and became the first quarterback to record 700 touchdown passes in regular season and postseason combined with a game-winning 58-yard pass to Breshad Perriman against the Bills.

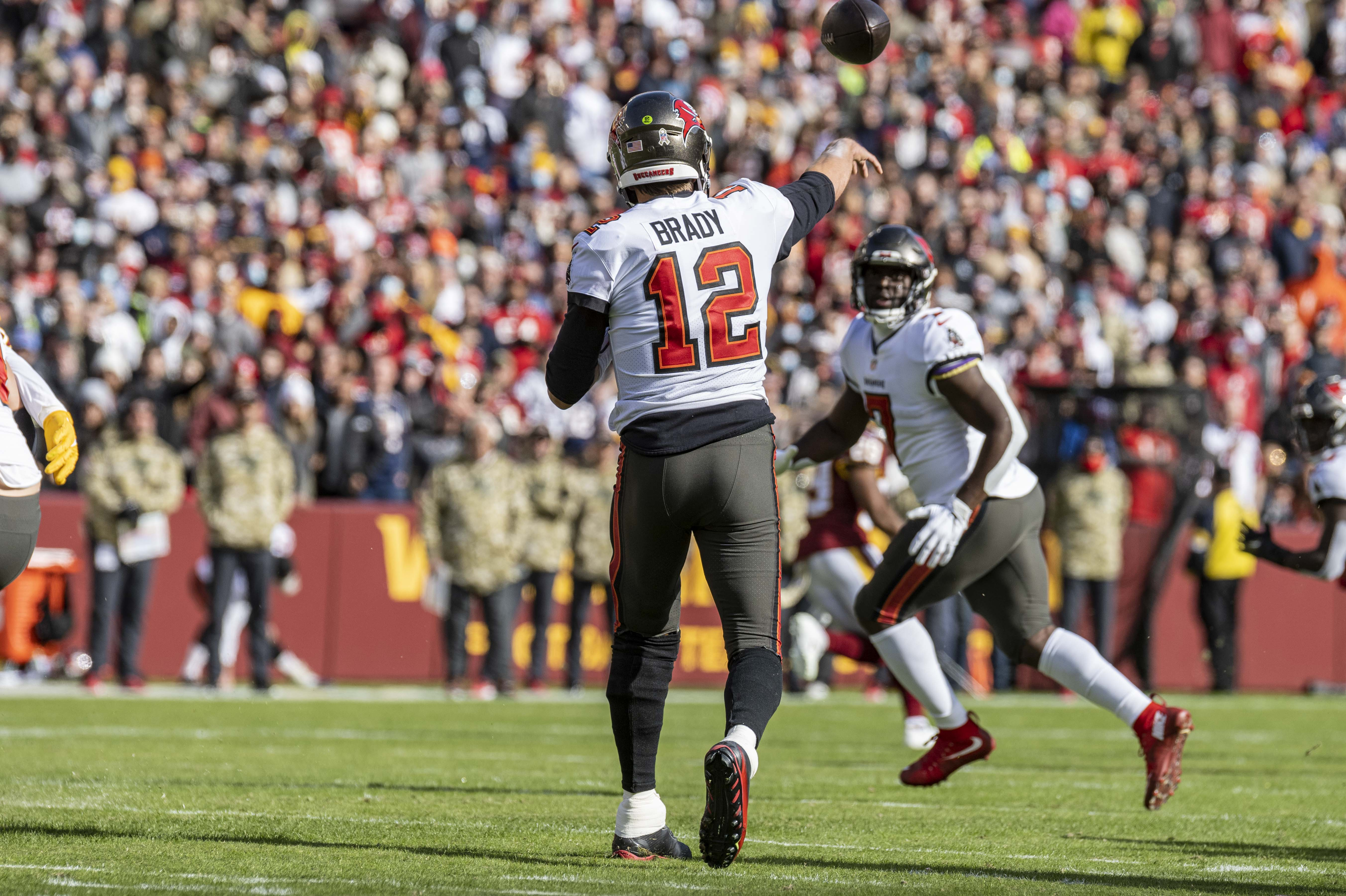
Brady throwing a pass during game in November 2021

Brady finished the 2021 season with an NFL record 485 pass completions for a career-high 5,316 passing yards, 43 passing touchdowns, and 12 interceptions. Brady became the oldest player in NFL history to pass for at least 5,000 yards and his passing yards total marked the third-most for a single season in NFL history. He was named to the Pro Bowl for the 15th time.

In the Wild Card Round, the Buccaneers faced off against the Eagles, as a rematch of their Week 6 regular season game. Brady completed 29 of 37 passes for 271 yards and 2 touchdowns as they won 31–15. Brady and the Buccaneers advanced to the Divisional Round to face off against the Rams, to whom they previously lost in the regular season. Brady and the Buccaneers fell behind 27–3 in the third quarter, until Brady was able to lead the team to 24 unanswered points and a tie game; however, the Rams scored a field goal in the closing seconds to defeat the Buccaneers 30–27. Brady finished the game with 329 yards, a touchdown, and an interception. The Rams later went on to win Super Bowl LVI.

==== Initial retirement ====
Brady announced his retirement on February 1, 2022, after 22 seasons. In Brady's first two years with Tampa, the Buccaneers posted a regular season record of 24–9, which were the two most successful back-to-back seasons in franchise history. Their 13–4 regular season record in 2021 was the best result in franchise history, eclipsing the 12–4 record of the 2002 Super Bowl winning team. Prior to Brady's arrival, the franchise had an all-time playoff record of 6–9; at the time of Brady's retirement, the all-time playoff record for Tampa Bay stood at 11–10. He was ranked first by his fellow players on the NFL Top 100 Players of 2022, his fourth time being ranked first.

==== 2022 season ====
On March 13, 2022, just 40 days after initially announcing his retirement, Brady announced he would return to the Buccaneers for the 2022 season. In the Buccaneers' season-opening game against the Cowboys, Brady became the oldest quarterback to start a game in NFL history. In Week 3 against the Packers, Brady became the first quarterback in NFL history to reach 85,000 career passing yards. Brady and the Buccaneers lost in Weeks 6, 7, and 8, dropping the team to 3–5. It was the first three-game losing streak for Brady since his 2002 season with the Patriots. In Week 8 against the Ravens, Brady was sacked by Justin Houston just before halftime. In turn, Brady became the most sacked quarterback in NFL history with 555 sacks taken, passing Ben Roethlisberger.

In Week 9 against the Rams, Brady became the first quarterback in NFL history to reach 100,000 passing yards in his career (combined regular season and postseason). With nine seconds left in regulation, Brady completed a touchdown pass to rookie tight end Cade Otton to win 16–13. The game-winning drive was the 55th of Brady's career, passing Peyton Manning for the most all-time. The following week, Brady led the Buccaneers to a 21–16 victory over the Seahawks in a game played in Germany, making Brady the first quarterback to win NFL games in three different countries outside the U.S. (having won games played in England and Mexico while he was with New England).

On November 27, Brady saw a streak end. He was 218–0 when his team was leading by at least seven points in the final two minutes of regulation. Facing the Browns, the Buccaneers led by seven until the final thirty seconds when the Browns tied the game on a touchdown in an eventual overtime win by Cleveland. In a Week 13 matchup against the Saints, Brady threw a touchdown pass to Rachaad White with three seconds remaining to complete a 13-point comeback. This was the second time in Brady's career that he had surmounted a fourth-quarter deficit of 13-plus points, the first being versus the Falcons in Super Bowl LI when the Patriots came back after being down 28–3 to win in overtime.

In Week 17, against the Panthers, he passed for 432 yards and three touchdowns in the 30–24 victory. In Week 18 against the Falcons, Brady broke his own NFL record for completions in a season, as well as Matthew Stafford's 2012 record for pass attempts in a season. However, the Buccaneers lost 30–17, giving Brady his first career losing season as the starter. 2022 marked the first season in which Brady lost eight or more games. Brady was pulled in the second quarter to prevent injury, as the Buccaneers had clinched their playoff position the previous week by winning the NFC South. Against the Dallas Cowboys in the Wild Card Round, Brady passed for 351 yards, two touchdowns, and one interception in the 31–14 loss. In the loss, Brady set postseason single-game franchise records for pass attempts (66) and pass completions (35). The loss to the Cowboys marked the first time since 2013 that Brady lost in the playoffs in consecutive seasons.

=== Retirement ===
On February 1, 2023, Brady announced on social media that he was retiring "for good". He filed his retirement papers with the NFL and NFLPA nine days later. During a halftime ceremony on September 10, 2023, the Patriots' first game of the season, Robert Kraft announced he would waive the traditional four-year post-retirement waiting period required for Brady's candidacy to the Patriots Hall of Fame, as well as directly inducting him without the customary ballot. His induction took place on June 12, 2024 (the date chosen in reference for the number of championships Brady won in New England, as June is the sixth month of the year, and with his jersey number representing the day), in the first Patriots Hall of Fame induction ceremony to take place within Gillette Stadium. Brady was the first person in Gillette Stadium history to become a "Keeper of the Light", ringing the bell in the newly redesigned lighthouse. In the presence of his family, former teammates, coaches, friends, as well as a crowd of over 60,000 fans at Gillette Stadium, the Patriots celebrated Brady's career with the franchise in a dedicated three-hour event. After speaker panels and video tributes, he was inducted as the 35th member of the Patriots Hall of Fame. Brady delivered a heartfelt speech to the crowd, declaring: "All our lives take us on different journeys, they take us to different places, they bring different people into our lives, but one thing I am sure of — and that will never change — is that I am a Patriot for life."

In an Instagram post in December 2023, reflecting on the year, Brady stated that he heavily considered un-retiring a second time in May 2023 to play the 2023 season but was "forced" to decide against it when his friends hosted a surprise retirement party for him.

On June 12, 2024, prior to the induction ceremony, Governor Maura Healey declared June 12 officially "Tom Brady Day" in Massachusetts. Kraft announced that the franchise would formally retire Brady's number 12 jersey and revealed that a 12-foot-tall (3.7 m) statue of Brady was being constructed to be placed at the Patriots Hall of Fame building. The statue of Tom Brady, displayed in front of Gillette Stadium, was unveiled in a public ceremony on August 8, 2025.

In March 2026, a 48-year-old Brady revealed that he had inquired about coming out of retirement to once again play in the NFL, but the league balked at the idea due to his status as part-owner of the Las Vegas Raiders and the issues it would cause with the salary cap. Brady then confirmed that he was still happily retired.

== Broadcasting career ==
On May 10, 2022, Fox Sports announced that Brady would join the network as the lead color commentator. Brady's deal with Fox will reportedly pay him $375 million over 10 years, making Brady the highest paid sports commentator in history. Brady began his broadcasting career during the 2024 UFL championship game's second quarter, and made his NFL on Fox debut alongside play caller Kevin Burkhardt starting with the 2024 NFL season. Brady was also a part of the Fox broadcast team for Super Bowl LIX.

After Brady submitted a bid to become part owner of the Las Vegas Raiders, the NFL has put several restrictions on him. Brady may not attend in-person or online broadcast production meetings, nor is he allowed to have access to team facilities, coaches, or players. He also must follow rules in the NFL constitution and bylaws that prohibit owners or prospective owners from publicly criticizing game officials and other teams. These restrictions were "relaxed" prior to the 2025 NFL season where Brady was allowed to attend production meetings remotely and to interview players off-site.

== Career statistics ==
Legend
	AP NFL MVP
	Super Bowl MVP
	Won the Super Bowl
	NFL record
	Led the league
**Bold**	Career high

=== NFL ===
==== Regular season ====
Year	Team	Games			Passing											Rushing					Sacked		Fumbles (Note: Fumbles lost data taken from Pro Football Reference career game log)	
Year	Team	GP	GS	Record	Cmp	Att	Pct	Yds	Y/A	Lng	TD	TD%	Int	Int%	Rtg	Att	Yds	Y/A	Lng	TD	Sck	Yds	Fum	Lost
2000	NE	1	0	—	1	3	33.3	6	2.0	6	0	0.0	0	0.0	42.4	0	0	0.0	0	0	0	0	0	0
2001	NE	15	14	11–3	264	413	63.9	2,843	6.9	91	18	4.4	12	2.9	86.5	36	43	1.2	12	0	**41**	216	12	1
2002	NE	16	16	9–7	373	601	62.1	3,764	6.3	49	28	4.7	**14**	2.3	85.7	42	**110**	2.6	15	1	31	190	11	**5**
2003	NE	16	16	14–2	317	527	60.2	3,620	6.9	82	23	4.4	12	2.3	85.9	42	63	1.5	11	1	32	219	**13**	**5**
2004	NE	16	16	14–2	288	474	60.8	3,692	7.8	50	28	5.9	**14**	**3.0**	92.6	43	28	0.7	10	0	26	162	7	**5**
2005	NE	16	16	10–6	334	530	63.0	4,110	7.8	71	26	4.9	**14**	2.6	92.3	27	89	**3.3**	15	1	26	188	4	3
2006	NE	16	16	12–4	319	516	61.8	3,529	6.8	62	24	4.7	12	2.3	87.9	**49**	102	2.1	**22**	0	26	175	12	4
2007	NE	16	16	**16–0**	398	578	**68.9**	4,806	8.3	69	**50**	**8.7**	8	1.4	**117.2**	37	98	2.6	19	2	21	128	6	4
2008	NE	1	1	1–0	7	11	63.6	76	6.9	26	0	0.0	0	0.0	83.9	0	0	0.0	0	0	0	0	0	0
2009	NE	16	16	10–6	371	565	65.7	4,398	7.8	81	28	5.0	13	2.3	96.2	29	44	1.5	9	1	16	86	4	2
2010	NE	16	16	14–2	324	492	65.9	3,900	7.9	79	36	7.3	4	0.8	111.0	31	30	1.0	9	1	25	175	3	1
2011	NE	16	16	13–3	401	611	65.6	5,235	**8.6**	**99**	39	6.4	12	2.0	105.6	43	109	2.5	13	3	32	173	6	2
2012	NE	16	16	12–4	401	637	63.0	4,827	7.6	83	34	5.3	8	1.3	98.7	23	32	1.4	7	**4**	27	182	2	0
2013	NE	16	16	12–4	380	628	60.5	4,343	6.9	81	25	4.0	11	1.8	87.3	32	18	0.6	11	0	40	**256**	9	3
2014	NE	16	16	12–4	373	582	64.1	4,109	7.1	69	33	5.7	9	1.5	97.4	36	57	1.6	17	0	21	134	6	3
2015	NE	16	16	12–4	402	624	64.4	4,770	7.6	76	36	5.8	7	1.1	102.2	34	53	1.6	13	3	38	225	6	2
2016	NE	12	12	11–1	291	432	67.4	3,554	8.2	79	28	6.5	2	0.5	112.2	28	64	2.3	15	0	15	87	5	0
2017	NE	16	16	13–3	385	581	66.3	4,577	7.9	64	32	5.5	8	1.4	102.8	25	28	1.1	7	0	35	201	7	3
2018	NE	16	16	11–5	375	570	65.8	4,355	7.6	63	29	5.1	11	1.9	97.7	23	35	1.5	10	2	21	147	4	2
2019	NE	16	16	12–4	373	613	60.8	4,057	6.6	59	24	3.9	8	1.3	88.0	26	34	1.3	17	3	27	185	4	1
2020	TB	16	16	11–5	401	610	65.7	4,633	7.6	50	40	6.6	12	2.0	102.2	30	6	0.2	4	3	21	143	4	1
2021	TB	17	17	13–4	485	719	67.5	**5,316**	7.4	62	43	6.0	12	1.7	102.1	28	81	2.9	13	2	22	144	4	3
2022	TB	17	17	8–9	**490**	**733**	66.8	4,694	6.4	63	25	3.4	9	1.2	90.7	29	−1	0.0	2	1	22	160	5	4
Career		335	333	251–82	7,753	12,050	64.3	89,214	7.4	99	649	5.4	212	1.8	97.2	693	1,123	1.6	22	28	565	3,576	134	54

==== Postseason ====
Year	Team	Games			Passing											Rushing					Sacked		Fumbles	
Year	Team	GP	GS	Record	Cmp	Att	Pct	Yds	Y/A	Lng	TD	TD%	Int	Int%	Rtg	Att	Yds	Y/A	Lng	TD	Sck	Yds	Fum	Lost
2001	NE	3	3	3–0	60	97	61.9	572	5.9	29	1	1.0	1	1.0	77.3	8	**22**	**2.8**	6	**1**	5	36	1	0
2003	NE	3	3	3–0	75	126	59.5	792	6.3	52	5	4.0	2	1.6	84.5	12	18	1.5	12	0	0	0	0	0
2004	NE	3	3	3–0	55	81	67.9	587	7.2	60	5	6.2	0	0.0	**109.4**	7	3	0.4	3	**1**	7	**57**	1	**1**
2005	NE	2	2	1–1	35	63	55.6	542	**8.6**	**73**	4	6.3	2	3.2	92.2	3	8	2.7	7	0	4	12	**2**	0
2006	NE	3	3	2–1	70	119	58.8	724	6.1	49	5	4.2	**4**	3.4	76.5	8	18	2.3	12	0	4	22	**2**	0
2007	NE	3	3	2–1	77	109	**70.6**	737	6.8	53	6	5.5	3	2.3	96.0	4	−1	−0.3	2	0	8	52	1	**1**
2009	NE	1	1	0–1	23	42	54.8	154	3.7	24	2	4.8	3	**7.1**	49.1	0	0	0.0	0	0	3	22	1	**1**
2010	NE	1	1	0–1	29	45	64.4	299	6.6	37	2	4.4	1	2.2	89.0	2	2	1.0	3	0	5	40	1	0
2011	NE	3	3	2–1	75	111	67.6	878	7.9	61	8	7.2	**4**	3.6	100.4	9	10	1.1	4	**1**	3	15	0	0
2012	NE	2	2	1–1	54	94	57.4	664	7.1	47	4	4.3	2	2.1	84.7	3	4	1.3	3	0	1	9	0	0
2013	NE	2	2	1–1	37	63	58.7	475	7.5	53	1	1.6	0	0.0	87.7	3	6	2.0	8	**1**	4	34	1	0
2014	NE	3	3	3–0	**93**	135	68.9	921	6.8	46	**10**	7.4	**4**	3.0	100.3	11	10	0.9	9	**1**	4	24	0	0
2015	NE	2	2	1–1	55	98	56.1	612	6.2	42	3	3.1	2	2.0	76.6	9	19	2.1	11	**1**	4	18	0	0
2016	NE	3	3	3–0	**93**	**142**	65.5	**1,137**	8.0	48	7	4.9	3	2.1	97.7	9	13	1.4	**15**	0	**9**	42	0	0
2017	NE	3	3	2–1	89	139	64.0	1,132	8.1	50	8	5.8	0	0.0	108.6	7	8	1.1	6	0	4	17	1	**1**
2018	NE	3	3	3–0	85	125	68.0	953	7.6	35	2	1.6	3	2.4	85.9	5	−4	−0.8	0	0	1	9	1	0
2019	NE	1	1	0–1	20	37	54.1	209	5.6	29	0	0.0	1	2.7	59.4	0	0	0.0	0	0	0	0	0	0
2020	TB	4	4	**4–0**	81	138	58.7	1,061	7.7	52	**10**	7.2	3	2.2	98.1	**13**	−3	−0.2	2	**1**	6	37	**2**	0
2021	TB	2	2	1–1	59	91	64.8	600	6.6	55	3	3.3	1	1.1	90.0	1	0	0.0	0	0	7	49	1	**1**
2022	TB	1	1	0–1	35	66	53.0	351	5.3	30	2	3.0	1	1.5	72.2	0	0	0.0	0	0	2	17	1	0
Career		48	48	35–13	1,200	1,921	62.5	13,400	7.0	73	88	4.6	40	2.1	89.8	114	133	1.2	15	7	81	512	16	5

==== Super Bowl ====
Year	SB	Team	Opp.	Passing								Rushing				Result
Year	SB	Team	Opp.	Cmp	Att	Pct	Yds	Y/A	TD	Int	Rtg	Att	Yds	Y/A	TD	Result
2001	XXXVI	NE	STL	16	27	59.3	145	5.4	1	0	86.2	1	3	3.0	0	**W** 20–17
2003	XXXVIII	NE	CAR	32	48	66.7	354	7.4	3	1	100.5	2	12	6.0	0	**W** 32–29
2004	XXXIX	NE	PHI	23	33	69.7	236	7.2	2	0	110.2	1	−1	−1.0	0	**W** 24–21
2007	XLII	NE	NYG	29	48	60.4	266	5.5	1	0	82.5	0	0	0.0	0	L 17–14
2011	XLVI	NE	NYG	27	41	65.9	276	6.7	2	1	91.1	0	0	0.0	0	L 21–17
2014	XLIX	NE	SEA	37	50	**74.0**	328	6.6	**4**	**2**	101.1	2	−3	−1.5	0	**W** 28–24
2016	LI	NE	ATL	**43**	**62**	69.4	466	7.5	2	1	95.2	1	**15**	**15.0**	0	**W** 34–28 (OT)
2017	LII	NE	PHI	28	48	58.3	**505**	**10.5**	3	0	115.4	1	6	6.0	0	L 41–33
2018	LIII	NE	LAR	21	35	60.0	262	7.5	0	1	71.4	2	−2	−1.0	0	**W** 13–3
2020	LV	TB	KC	21	29	72.4	201	6.9	3	0	**125.8**	**4**	−2	−0.5	0	**W** 31–9
Career				277	421	65.8	3,039	7.2	21	6	97.7	14	28	2.0	0	W−L 7–3

=== College ===
Year	Team	Passing								Rushing			
Year	Team	Cmp	Att	Pct	Yds	Y/A	TD	Int	Rtg	Att	Yds	Avg	TD
1995	Michigan	Redshirt											
1996	Michigan	3	5	60.0	26	5.2	0	1	63.7	0	0	0.0	0
1997	Michigan	12	15	**80.0**	103	6.9	0	0	137.7	2	−14	−7.0	0
1998	Michigan	**200**	**323**	61.9	**2,427**	**7.5**	14	**10**	133.1	**54**	−105	−1.9	**2**
1999	Michigan	180	295	61.0	2,217	**7.5**	**16**	6	**138.0**	34	−31	−0.9	1
Career		395	638	61.9	4,773	7.5	30	17	134.9	90	−150	−1.7	3

== Career highlights ==
=== Awards and honors ===
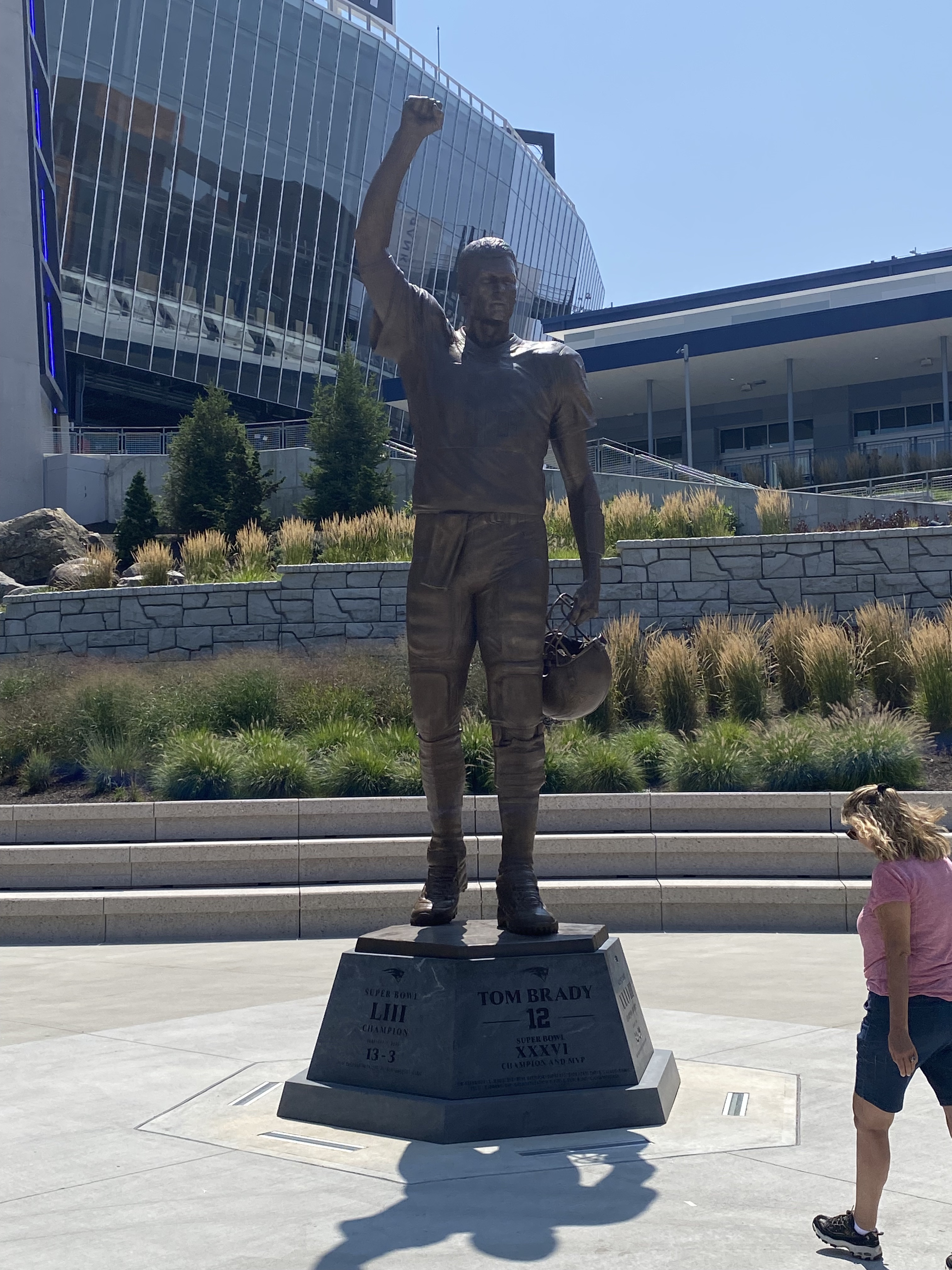
The statue of Tom Brady, displayed in front of Gillette Stadium

NFL

- 7× Super Bowl champion: XXXVI, XXXVIII, XXXIX, XLIX, LI, LIII, LV (most for any individual player or franchise)
- 5× Super Bowl MVP: XXXVI, XXXVIII, XLIX, LI, LV
- 3× NFL Most Valuable Player: 2007, 2010, 2017
- 2× NFL Offensive Player of the Year: 2007, 2010
- 5× AFC Offensive Player of the Year: 2007, 2010, 2011, 2015, 2016
- NFL Comeback Player of the Year: 2009
- 3× First-team All-Pro: 2007, 2010, 2017
- 3× Second-team All-Pro: 2005, 2016, 2021
- 15× Pro Bowl: 2001, 2004, 2005, 2007, 2009–2018, 2021
- Bert Bell Award: 2007
- DC Touchdown Club NFL Player of the Year 2007
- Ed Block Courage Award: 2009
- FedEx Air NFL Player of the Year: 2021
- 20× FedEx Air NFL Player of the Week
- 10× AFC Offensive Player of the Month
- NFC Offensive Player of the Month (October 2020)
- 30× AFC Offensive Player of the Week
- 2× NFC Offensive Player of the Week
- 8× Pro Football Weekly NFL Offensive Player of the Week
- 12× NFL Top 100 — 1st (2011), 4th (2012), 4th (2013), 3rd (2014), 3rd (2015), 2nd (2016), 1st (2017), 1st (2018), 6th (2019), 14th (2020), 7th (2021), 1st (2022)
- 5× NFL passing touchdowns leader: 2002, 2007, 2010, 2015, 2021
- 4× NFL passing yards leader: 2005, 2007, 2017, 2021
- 2× NFL passer rating leader: 2007, 2010
- 3× NFL pass attempts leader: 2017, 2021, 2022
- 2× NFL pass completions leader: 2021, 2022
- NFL completion percentage leader: 2007
- 2× Total quarterback rating leader: 2007, 2010
- 2× NFL Approximate Value leader: 2007, 2017
- NFL 2000s All-Decade Team
- NFL 2000s Player of the Decade
- NFL 2000s Team of the Decade: New England Patriots
- NFL 2010s All-Decade Team
- NFL 2010s Player of the Decade
- NFL 2010s Team of the Decade: New England Patriots
- NFL 100th Anniversary All-Time Team (unanimous selection)
- No. 21 on The Top 100: NFL's Greatest Players (2010)
- 7× NFL Top 100 Teams of All Time: #7 – 2007, #16 – 2004, #21 – 2016, #32 – 2003, #46 – 2014, #51 – 2001, #79 – 2018
- NFL Greatest Quarterback of All Time: 2019
- 2001 New England Patriots 12th Player Award
- New England Patriots Hall of Fame
- New England Patriots All-2000s Team
- New England Patriots 50th Anniversary Team
- New England Patriots All-2010s Team
- New England Patriots All-Dynasty Team
- New England Patriots All-Time Team
- New England Patriots No. 12 Retired
- Statue outside Gillette Stadium in Foxborough, Massachusetts

NCAA

- 1997 national champion (Associated Press Poll) (as backup QB)
- 2× Big Ten champion: 1997 (as backup QB), 1998
- 1998 Rose Bowl champion (as backup QB)
- Week 5, 1998 Big Ten Co-Offensive Player of the Week
- 1998 Academic All-Big Ten
- 2× All-Big Ten honorable mention: 1998, 1999
- 1999 Florida Citrus Bowl champion
- 1999 Big Ten completion percentage leader
- 1999 Big Ten PER leader
- 1999 Michigan Team Captain
- 1999 Michigan Most Valuable Player
- 2000 Orange Bowl champion
- 2000 East–West Shrine Bowl champion
- East–West Shrine Bowl All-Century Team

High school

- Junípero Serra High School
  - 2× Team MVP: 1994, 1995
  - 1994 Football Blanket Award
  - 1994 All-State
  - 1994 All-Far West
  - 1994 Blue Chip Illustrated All-American
  - 1994 Prep Football Report All-American
  - 1994 CCS Baseball Championship
  - 1994 Second Team All-WCAL (baseball)
  - 1995 First Team All-WCAL (baseball)
  - 1995 First Team All-County (baseball)
  - 1995 Mercury News First Team All-CCS (baseball)
  - 1995 James P. Shea Award
  - Hall of Fame Class of 2004
- Selected by the Montreal Expos in the 18th Round of the 1995 MLB draft
- California High School Football Hall of Fame Inaugural Class of 2023
- California Interscholastic Federation 100th Anniversary Fall All-Century Team

Media

- 2007 Associated Press Male Athlete of the Year
- 2007 NEA Jim Thorpe Memorial Trophy
- 2007 NFL Alumni Quarterback of the Year
- 2× United States Sports Academy Male Athlete of the Year: 2015, 2017
- 2021 Sports Business Journal Athlete of the Year
- Sports Illustrated
  - 2× Sports Illustrated Sportsman of the Year: 2005, 2021
  - 3× NFL MVP: 2007, 2010, 2017
  - 2010 NFL Offensive Player of the Year
  - 2009 NFL Comeback Player of the Year
  - NFL 2000s All-Decade Team
  - NFL 2010s All-Decade Team
  - NFL 2000s Team of the Decade: 2007 New England Patriots
  - NFL 2000s Biggest Draft Steal of the Decade
  - NFL All-Quarter Century First Team
  - Greatest Quarterback in NFL History
  - Best NFL Player of All Time
  - 4× Sports Illustrated Fashionable 50: (Note: This list was only published between 2016–2019) 2016, 2017, 2018, 2019
- Pro Football Writers of America
  - 3× PFWA NFL MVP: 2007, 2010, 2017
  - 2× PFWA NFL Offensive Player of the Year: 2007, 2010
  - 2009 PFWA NFL Comeback Player of the Year
  - 3× PFWA All-NFL Team: 2007, 2010, 2017
  - 7× PFWA All-AFC Team: 2007, 2010, 2011, 2014, 2015, 2016, 2017
- The Sporting News
  - 2× The Sporting News Athlete of the Year: 2004, 2007
  - 3× NFL Player of the Year: (Note: Beginning in 2008 The Sporting News chose an offensive player of the year and a defensive player of the year.) 2007, 2010, 2016
  - 5× First Team All-Pro: 2007, 2010, 2012, 2016, 2017
  - NFL 2010s Athlete of the Decade
  - NFL 2010s All-Decade Team
  - Greatest Patriots Player Ever
  - 3rd Greatest Athlete of the Quarter-Century
  - Greatest NFL Quarterback of All Time
- Pro Football Focus
  - 2016 Best Player
  - 2021 NFL MVP
  - 2× NFL Offensive Player of the Year: 2016, 2017
  - 2× Best Passer: 2016, 2017
  - 3× First Team All-Pro: 2016, 2017, 2021
  - 2× Second Team All-Pro: 2007, 2015
  - NFL 2006–2015 All-Decade Team
  - NFL 2010s All-Decade Team
  - NFL 2010s Player of the Decade
  - NFL All-Quarter Century Team
- USA Today
  - NFL 2000s Quarterback of the Decade
  - NFL 2000s All-Decade Team
  - NFL 2010s All-Decade Team
  - Greatest NFL Quarterback of All Time
- CBS Sports
  - NFL 2010s Quarterback of the Decade
  - NFL 2010s All-Decade Team
  - NFL All-Quarter Century Team
  - New England Patriots All-Time Team
  - Greatest NFL Quarterback of All Time
  - Greatest Player in NFL History
- Yahoo Sports
  - NFL 2010s All-Decade Team
  - 2000s Professional Sports Team of the Decade: New England Patriots
  - 2010s Professional Sports Team of the Decade: New England Patriots
  - NFL All-Quarter Century Team
- Yardbarker
  - NFL 2000s Team of the Decade: New England Patriots
  - NFL 2010s Quarterback of the Decade
  - NFL 2010s All-Decade First Team
  - NFL All-21st Century First Team
  - Greatest NFL Quarterback of All Time
- Bleacher Report
  - 2017 NFL MVP
  - 2× NFL Offensive Player of the Year: 2010, 2012
  - 2011 AFC Offensive Player of the Year
  - Best Quarterback of 2007 (2nd half)
  - 2009 NFL Comeback Player of the Year
  - NFL 21st Century All-Star Team
  - NFL 2000s All-Decade Team
  - NFL 2000s Team of the Decade: New England Patriots
  - NFL All-Quarter Century First Team
  - NFL All-Time Team
  - Greatest Quarterback in NFL History
- ESPN
  - NFL 2010s Player of the Decade
  - NFL 2000s All-Decade Team
  - NFL 2010s All-Decade Team
  - NFL All-Quarter Century Team
  - Greatest NFL Quarterback of All Time
  - Greatest NFL Player of the 21st Century
  - 4× ESPN World Fame 100: 2016, 2017, 2018, 2019
- ESPY Awards
  - 2002 Best Breakthrough Athlete
  - 2021 Best Male Athlete
  - 3× Best NFL Player: 2008, 2018, 2021
  - 2021 Outstanding Team (with the Tampa Bay Buccaneers)
- Nickelodeon Kids' Choice Awards
  - 2019 Best Cannon
  - 2019 Favorite Football Player
  - 2022 Favorite Male Sports Star
- 2× Hickok Belt monthly winner (January & February 2015; February 2017; January 2019)
- Week 2, 2021 NFL Slimetime NVP Award
- Fox Sports Best NFL Quarterback of All Time
- NBC Sports NFL All-Time Team
- The Big Lead NFL All-Quarter Century Team
- The Enterprise NFL 2000s Team of the Decade: New England Patriots
- SB Nation NFL 2010s Team of the Decade: New England Patriots
- Esquire magazine's Best Dressed Man in the World: 2007
- 2× Time 100: 2017, 2021
- Best Buddies International – 2023 Spirit of Leadership Award

Laureus World Sports Awards

- 2022 Laureus Lifetime Achievement Award

Sports Emmy Awards

- 2022 Outstanding Documentary Series (as star and executive producer of Man in the Arena)

Fanatics

- (gold) 2025 Fanatics Games

WNBA

- 2× WNBA champion (2023, 2025) (as part owner of the Las Vegas Aces)

Union Internationale Motonautique

- 2× E1 World Championship (2024, 2025) (as owner of Team Brady)

=== NFL career records ===
==== Regular season ====
- Most games won by a player: 251
- Most games won at quarterback with a single team: 219
- Most games played by a non-kicker: 335
- Most games played at quarterback with a single team: 285
- Most games started by a player: 333
- Most division titles: 19 (17 with New England, 2 with Tampa Bay)
- Fourth quarterback to beat all 32 teams
- Best touchdown to interception ratio in a season: 28:2 (2016)
- Oldest quarterback to lead the league in passing yards: 44 (5,316 yards: 2021)
- Oldest player to win NFL MVP: 40
- Most career passing yards: 89,214
- Most career pass completions: 7,753
- Most career passing attempts: 12,050
- Most career touchdown passes: 649
- Most career passing yards with one team: 74,571
- Most career pass completions with one team: 6,377
- Most career passing attempts with one team: 9,988
- Most career passing touchdowns with one team: 541
- Most Pro Bowl selections: 15
- Most NFL Player of the Month selections: 11
- Most NFL Player of the Week selections: 40
- Most seasons as passing touchdowns leader: 5
- Most 4th quarter comebacks: 46
- Most game-winning drives: 58
- Longest pass-play: 99 yards, tied (2011)
- Total quarterback rating, single season: 88.2 (2007)
- Most pass attempts, single season: 733 (2022)
- Most passes completed, single season: 490 (2022)
- Career approximate value leader: 326
- Career (weighted) approximate value leader: 184
- Touchdown passes to most different receivers: 96

==== Playoffs ====
- Most consecutive seasons in the NFL playoffs by a team, player or head coach: 14
- Most games started: 48
- Most games won by a starting quarterback: 35
- Most consecutive wins by a starting quarterback: 10 (2001–2005)
- Most consecutive wins to start a career by a starting quarterback: 10 (2001, 2003–2005)
- Most touchdown passes: 88
- Most passing yards: 13,400
- Most passing yards in a single playoff game: 505 (Super Bowl LII)
- Most passes completed: 1,200
- Most passes attempted: 1,921
- Most NFL conference championship appearances by a starting quarterback: 14
- Most NFL conference championship wins by a starting quarterback: 10
- Oldest quarterback to win an AFC title game: 41 years, 5 months, 17 days
- Oldest quarterback to win an NFC title game: 43 years, 5 months, 21 days
- Most career 300+ passing yard games: 19
- Most game-winning drives: 14
- Most fourth-quarter comebacks: 9
- Most multi-TD pass games: 29
- Most teams beaten by a quarterback: 19
- Most stadiums won in by a quarterback: 13

==== Super Bowl ====
- Most NFL championships by player: 7
- The only starting quarterback to win the Super Bowl for both the AFC and NFC
- Most Super Bowl MVPs: 5
- One of only two starting quarterbacks to win a Super Bowl for two separate teams (Peyton Manning)
- Most touchdown passes: 21
- Most passing yards: 3,039
- Most passes completed: 277
- Most passes attempted: 421
- Most passes completed in a single Super Bowl: 43 (LI)
- Most passes attempted in a single Super Bowl: 62 (LI)
- Most passing yards in a single Super Bowl: 505 (LII)
- Most Super Bowl appearances: 10
- Most passing attempts without an interception in a single Super Bowl: 48 (XLII & LII)
- Oldest quarterback to start a Super Bowl: 43 years, 6 months, and 4 days
- Oldest quarterback to win a Super Bowl: 43 years, 6 months, and 4 days
- Oldest player to win Super Bowl MVP: 43 years, 6 months, and 4 days
- Most consecutive completions in a single Super Bowl: 16 (XLVI)
- Most game-winning drives: 6

==== New England Patriots franchise records ====
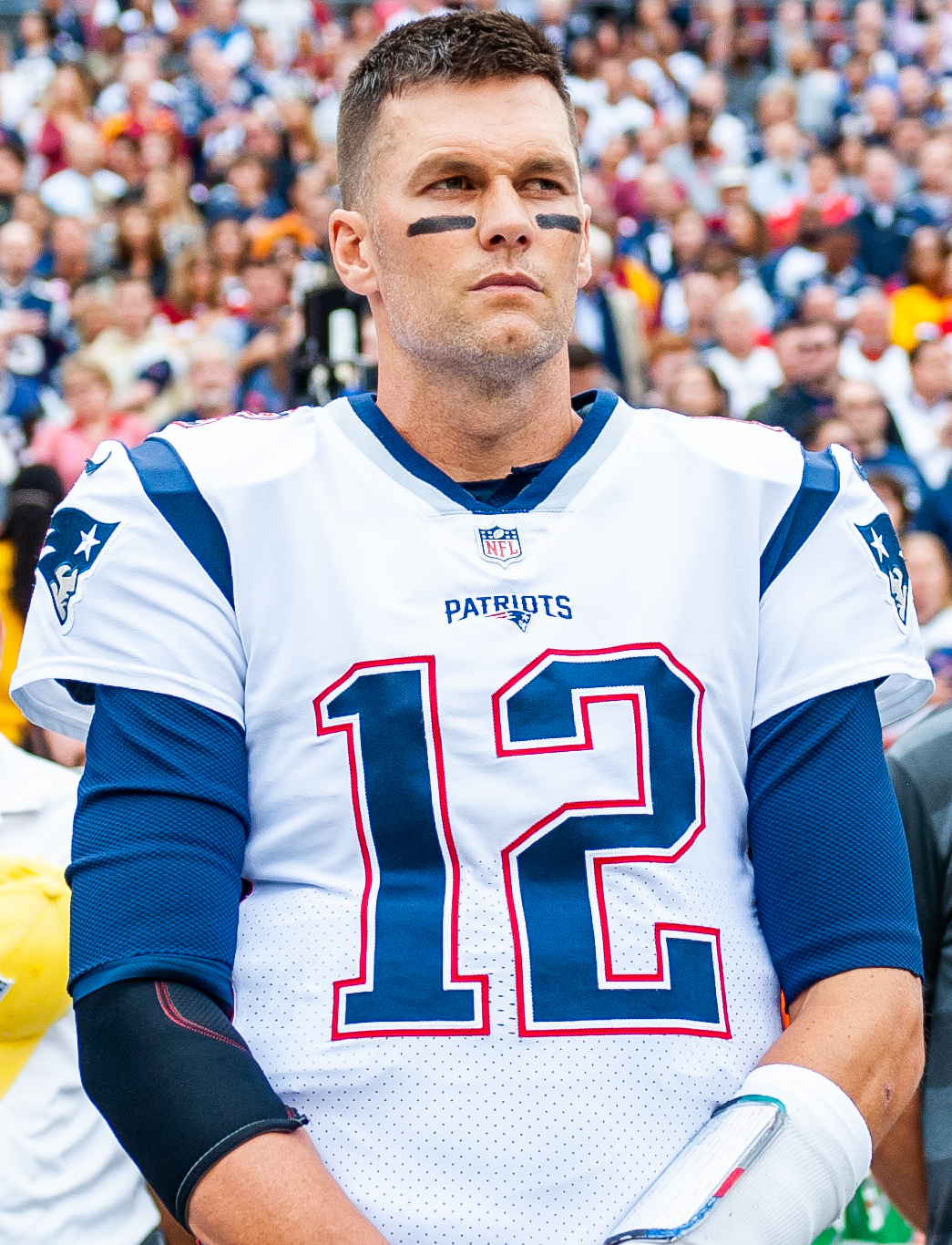
Brady holds nearly every record in career, single-season, and single-game passing statistics for the Patriots (regular season and playoffs), in addition to having the most total games played with the franchise

- Games played: 285
- Games played (playoffs): 41
- Most seasons played: 20
- Games won as starter: 219
- Games won as starter (playoffs): 30
- Games won as starting QB, single season: 16 (2007)
- Passing yards, career: 74,571
- Passing touchdowns, career: 541
- Pass completions, career: 6,377
- Pass attempts, career: 9,988
- Passing yards, single season: 5,235 (2011)
- Passing touchdowns, single season: 50 (2007)
- Pass completions, single season: 402 (2015)
- Passer rating, single season: 117.2 (2007)
- Completion percentage, single season: 68.9% (2007)

==== Tampa Bay Buccaneers franchise records ====
- Passing touchdowns, single season: 43 (2021)
- Pass completions, single season: 490 (2022)
- Pass attempts, single season: 733 (2022)
- Passing yards, single season: 5,316 (2021)
- Completion percentage, single season: 67.5% (2021)
- Passer rating, single season: 102.2 (2020)

== Other endeavors ==
=== TV and film ===
Brady has featured as a guest star on television programs, hosting Saturday Night Live in 2005 voicing himself in the 2005 The Simpsons episode "Homer and Ned's Hail Mary Pass" and in the 2006 Family Guy episode "Patriot Games". In 2009, Brady appeared as himself in an episode of Entourage and in 2015, Brady had cameos as fictionalized versions of himself in the Entourage movie and Ted 2. Gotham Chopra filmed Brady during the 2017 off-season and regular season for a Facebook Watch documentary series entitled Tom vs Time.

In 2017, Brady co-founded the production company Religion of Sports with Michael Strahan and Gotham Chopra, which focuses primarily on sports documentaries. In March 2020, Brady also launched 199 Productions (named in reference to his pick number from the 2000 NFL draft), which focuses on "high-end" entertainment projects, some of which involving Brady himself in on-camera roles.

In 2022, Netflix announced that Brady would be featured in a series of specials called "Greatest Roasts of All Time: GROAT." Brady is the executive producer. The Roast of Tom Brady aired on Netflix on May 5, 2024 and drew two million live viewers.

=== Endorsements and product development ===
In 2007, Brady was a model for the Stetson cologne. He has endorsed brands including Uggs, Under Armour, Movado, Aston Martin and Glaceau Smartwater. Brady earned around $44 million from endorsements as of 2025. In 2016, he began appearing in a Beautyrest Black commercial campaign for Simmons Bedding Company and launched a line of vegan snacks. In 2016, Brady announced the launch of TB12Sports.com, which features his training regimen information and a store to purchase TB12 merchandise. On August 23, 2016, the TB12 brand expanded to offer a snack line. Brady announced the formation of the TB12 Foundation, a nonprofit to provide free post-injury rehabilitation and training to underprivileged young athletes. In 2017, Brady partnered with meal-kit startup Purple Carrot to offer TB12 Performance Meals. The meals utilize whole foods and focus on providing nutrients for workout recovery. In September 2017, Simon & Schuster published Brady's first book The TB12 Method: How to Achieve a Lifetime of Sustained Peak Performance, which became a number one best-seller on Amazon.com and The New York Times weekly Best Sellers list. In 2021, Brady endorsed Subway and its partnership with Hero Bread, a company that produces low-net-carb baked goods in which he is an investor.

In 2021, Brady and Richard Rosenblatt co-founded a sports-based NFT platform called Autograph. Autograph reached a deal with DraftKings for exclusive distribution on Autograph's sports products, creating the DraftKings Marketplace. In January 2021, Autograph announced it raised $170M in funding. In 2023, the company announced layoffs for nearly a third of its workforce. On September 6, 2023, it was announced that Delta Air Lines had hired Brady as a strategic advisor. In January 2024, Brady agreed to merge his health and apparel brands with NoBull and to become its second-largest shareholder.

Also in 2021, Brady, among other athletes and celebrities, was a paid spokesperson for FTX, a cryptocurrency exchange. In 2022, FTX filed for bankruptcy, wiping out billions of dollars in customer funds. He, alongside other spokespeople, is being sued through a class-action lawsuit, for promoting unregistered securities. In February 2022, the U.S. 11th Circuit Court of Appeals ruled in a lawsuit against Bitconnect that the Securities Act of 1933 extends to targeted solicitation using social media. In 2023, it was reported Brady owned 1 million shares in FTX, and he and his wife lost an estimated combined value of $45 million when FTX went bankrupt.

In November 2025, Brady announced that blood drawn from his family's elderly dog prior to its death was used in non-invasive cloning technology. Brady partnered with Colossal Biosciences to create the clone named Junie and is an investor in the company.

=== Team ownership ===
In March 2023, Brady purchased a minority stake in the Las Vegas Aces of the WNBA from the team's majority owner Mark Davis. Aces went on to win the WNBA Championship. In May 2023, Brady and business partner, Knighthead Capital Management co-founder Tom Wagner, entered into an agreement to purchase 10% of the Las Vegas Raiders from majority owner Mark Davis. The original deal was delayed due to concerns from NFL owners that Brady was receiving too big a discount. In October 2024, a revised agreement was approved by NFL owners, with Brady owning a 5% stake and Wagner owning 5%. In August 2023, Brady became a minority owner and chairman of a new advisory board at English football club Birmingham City, a position which he kept until departing on November 9, 2026. In 2023, Tom founded Team Brady, an electric boat racing team which competes in the E1 Series. After winning three races in 2024, the team became world champions.

Brady participated in The Match, a charity golf event featuring professional golfers and other athletes, from 2020 to 2022.

=== Flag football ===
On March 21, 2026, Brady played in the inaugural five-on-five Fanatics Flag Football Classic tournament at BMO Stadium in Los Angeles. The event, organized in part to promote flag football at the Summer Olympics, consisted of several other NFL players and members of the US national flag football team. It was originally scheduled to be held at the Kingdom Arena in Saudi Arabia prior to the outbreak of the 2026 Iran war.

== Personal life ==
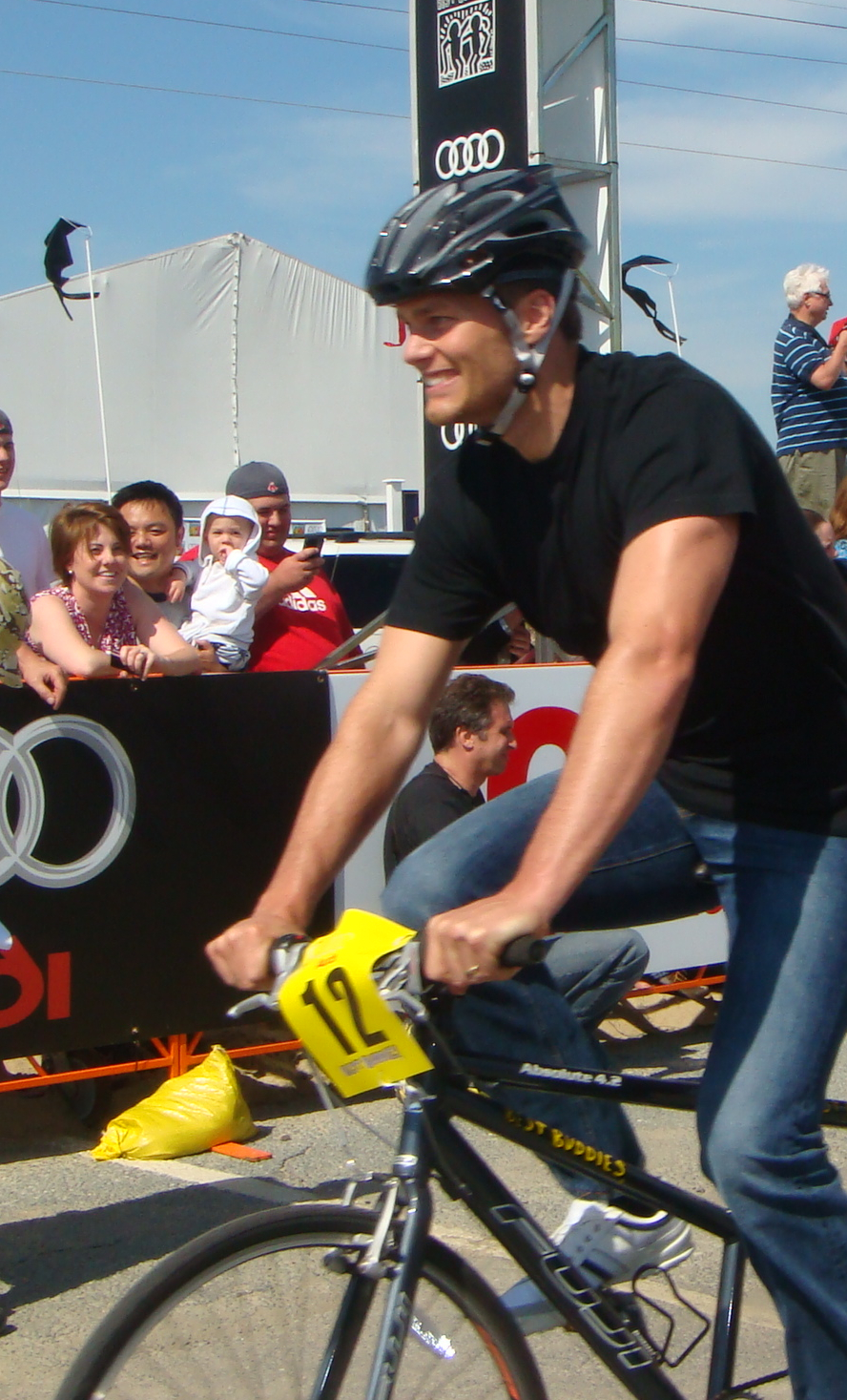
Brady riding a bicycle for charity at the Best Buddies Ride in Hyannis, Massachusetts, in May 2009

Brady was raised Catholic, but in a 2015 interview, expressed he was less religious than spiritual.

During his career with the Patriots, Brady and his family lived in the Boston suburb of Brookline, Massachusetts, and in New York City. They own several homes and spend time during the summer at the Yellowstone Club near Big Sky, Montana, and at their home at Silo Ridge in Amenia, New York. When Brady signed with the Buccaneers, he rented a mansion in Tampa, Florida. In December 2020, Brady and Bündchen reportedly bought a home in Indian Creek, Florida.

Brady also participated in the 2026 FIFA World Cup draw on December 5, 2025.

=== Family and relationships ===
Brady dated actress Bridget Moynahan from 2004 until December 2006. Brady and Moynahan ended their relationship soon after Moynahan became pregnant. In February 2007, Moynahan confirmed to People magazine that she was more than three months pregnant with Brady's child. Their son was born in August 2007.

Brady began dating Brazilian model Gisele Bündchen in December 2006. Brady and Bündchen married on February 26, 2009, in a Catholic ceremony at St. Monica Catholic Church in Santa Monica, California. Together, they have two children: a son, born in 2009, and a daughter, born in 2012. In October 2022, the couple announced their divorce.

Brady and baseball player Kevin Youkilis became brothers-in-law in 2012 when Youkilis married Brady's sister Julie. Brady's niece, Maya Brady, is a college softball player for the UCLA Bruins. Brady is a distant cousin of former MLB pitcher and left fielder Pete Meegan.

=== Politics ===
Brady attended the 2004 State of the Union Address as a guest of then-president George W. Bush. Brady told ESPN The Magazine in 2004 that being a U.S. Senator would be his "craziest ambition".

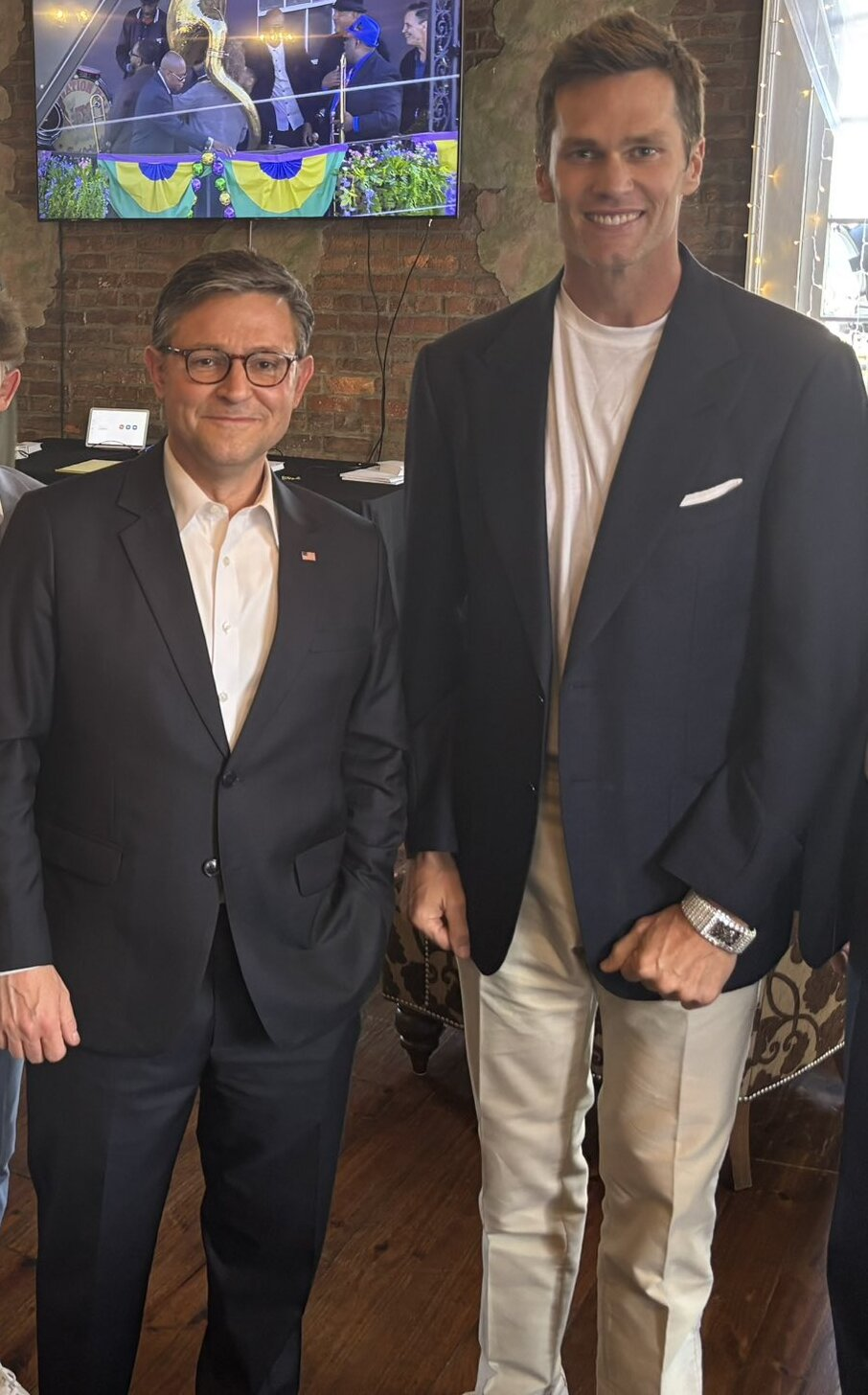
Brady at Super Bowl LIX with Speaker Mike Johnson

Brady is a friend of President Donald Trump. At a political event in New Hampshire on the day before the 2016 presidential election, Trump said he had received a call from Brady, and that Brady told him: "Donald, I support you, you're my friend, and I voted for you." After Bündchen was asked on Instagram whether she and Brady backed Trump, she answered "NO!" After a Trump campaign "Make America Great Again" cap was photographed in Brady's locker, Brady said Bündchen told him to not discuss politics anymore, which he thought was a "good decision". Brady did not join the Patriots in visiting Trump at the White House in 2017 after their Super Bowl victory, citing "personal family matters".

In an interview on The Howard Stern Show in April 2020, Brady explained that Trump had reached out to him to speak at the 2016 Republican National Convention, and he declined, saying, "It was uncomfortable for me because you can't undo things, not that I would undo a friendship, but political support is totally different than the support of a friend." Brady said he has known Trump since 2001 and that Trump asked him to be a judge in the Miss USA pageant, after Brady led the Patriots to victory in Super Bowl XXXVI. Brady explained that Trump used to come to Patriots games and would call him and golf with him occasionally; however, Brady said he did not see the benefit of getting involved in an event as polarizing as a presidential election. Brady said in 2022 that he had not spoken with Trump in "years" and that their relationship had been mischaracterized.

While there has been speculation that Brady would run for political office, in a 2015 interview he stated he had no interest in it. Brady reiterated in 2022 that he would avoid a political career because, "I don't think anyone's fond of politics these days." In 2018, Brady endorsed Republican Helen Brady (no relation) for State Auditor of Massachusetts.

=== Diet and lifestyle ===
Brady's health regimen includes transcendental meditation, yoga, hydrating, an 80/20 diet (meaning 80% alkaline and 20% acidic), early bedtime, resistance training, and neuroplasticity training.

Brady and his family adhere to his controversial and strict diet, dubbed the TB12 Method. Brady advocates a daily water intake in ounces of half of one's body weight in pounds and consumes "a couple hundred ounces" daily. He avoids most fruits, mushrooms, tomatoes, peppers, eggplants, coffee, Gatorade, white sugar, flour, gluten, dairy, soda, cereal, white rice, potatoes, and bread. In 2022, Brady said he prefers a diet consisting of organic food. "You've got to see the process of food being grown," he said. "If I need nutrients, I need that from soil."

One of Brady's former teammates, tight end Rob Gronkowski, has followed Brady and Alex Guerrero's plant-based diet plan since 2017. Other athletes who follow Brady's diet include quarterback Kirk Cousins and hockey player Mark Scheifele.

== Filmography ==
=== Film ===
Year	Title	Role
2003	Stuck on You	Computer geek
2015	Ted 2	Himself
2015	Entourage	Himself
2023	80 for Brady	Himself

=== Television ===
Year	Title	Role	Notes
2004	In the Game	Himself	Television documentary
2005	Saturday Night Live	Himself/Host	Season 30 Episode 17
2005	The Simpsons	Himself	Episode: "Homer and Ned's Hail Mary Pass"
2006	Family Guy	Himself	Episode: "Patriot Games"
2009	Entourage	Himself	Episode: "Fore!"
2011	Year of the Quarterback	Himself	Season 2 Episode 5: "The Brady 6"
2017	Huang's World	Himself	Season 2 Episode 6: "Cape Cod"
2018	Tom vs Time	Himself	6 episode Facebook Watch sports documentary series
2019	Living with Yourself	Himself	Episode: "The Best You Can Be"
2021	Man in the Arena: Tom Brady	Himself	10 episode ESPN miniseries
2024	The Dynasty: New England Patriots	Himself	10 episode Apple TV+ sports documentary series
2024	The Roast of Tom Brady	Himself	Netflix comedy special
2024	LEGO Marvel Avengers: Mission Demolition	Himself (voice)	Disney+ special
2025	Speed Goes Pro	Himself	Guest appearance in the IShowSpeed YouTube series

== See also ==
- List of gridiron football quarterbacks passing statistics
- List of NFL quarterback playoff records
- List of NFL quarterbacks with 5,000 passing yards in a season
- List of Super Bowl starting quarterbacks
- Michigan Wolverines football statistical leaders
- Tom Brady–Peyton Manning rivalry
