= NFL completion leaders =

NFL League completion leaders may refer to:

- List of NFL annual pass completion percentage leaders
- List of NFL career passing completions leaders
