= NFL passing yards leaders =

NFL passing yards leaders may refer to:

- List of NFL annual passing yards leaders
- List of NFL career passing yards leaders
