= 2021 NFL season =

American football season

Regular season
- Duration: September 9, 2021 – January 9, 2022

Playoffs
- Start date: January 15, 2022
- AFC Champions: Cincinnati Bengals
- NFC Champions: Los Angeles Rams

Super Bowl LVI
- Date: February 13, 2022
- Site: SoFi Stadium, Inglewood, California
- Champions: Los Angeles Rams

Pro Bowl
- Date: February 6, 2022
- Site: Allegiant Stadium, Paradise, Nevada

AFC teams: West, North, South, East
NFC teams: West, North, South, East

The 2021 NFL season was the 102nd season of the National Football League (NFL). The season was the first to feature a 17-game regular season schedule as the league expanded the season from 16 games. The regular season started on September 9, 2021, with defending Super Bowl LV champion Tampa Bay defeating Dallas in the NFL Kickoff Game. The regular season ended on January 9, 2022. The playoffs started on January 15 and concluded with Super Bowl LVI, the league's championship game, at SoFi Stadium in Inglewood, California, on February 13 (making this the latest end to a season at the time), with the Los Angeles Rams defeating Cincinnati. To compensate for revenue lost in 2020 due to the COVID-19 pandemic, the season's salary cap decreased to $182.5 million per team.

== Player movement ==
The 2021 NFL league year and trading period began on March 17. On March 15, teams were allowed to exercise options for 2021 on players with option clauses in their contracts, submit qualifying offers to their pending restricted free agents, and submit a Minimum Salary Tender to retain exclusive negotiating rights to their players with expiring 2020 contracts and fewer than three accrued seasons of free agent credit. Teams were required to be under the salary cap using the "top 51" definition (in which the 51 highest paid-players on the team's payroll must have a combined salary cap). On March 17, clubs were allowed to contact and begin contract negotiations with players whose contracts had expired and thus became unrestricted free agents.

This season's salary cap decreased to $182.5 million per team, down from $198.2 million in 2020 and lower than the $188.2 million in 2019. This was to compensate for the revenue lost in 2020 when the COVID-19 pandemic forced games to either be played with a greatly reduced audience or no fans at all.

Positions key
Offense	Defense	Special teams
QB — Quarterback; RB — Running back; FB — Fullback; WR — Wide receiver; TE — Tight end; OL — Offensive lineman; T — Tackle; G — Guard; C — Center	DL — Defensive lineman; DT — Defensive tackle (Note: Includes nose tackle (NT)); DE — Defensive end; EDGE — Edge rusher; LB — Linebacker (Note: Includes middle linebacker (MLB/MIKE), weakside linebacker (WILL), strongside linebacker (SAM), off-ball linebacker, and outside linebacker (OLB)); DB — Defensive back; CB — Cornerback; S — Safety (Note: Includes free safety (FS) and strong safety (SS))	K — Kicker (Note: Also known as a placekicker (PK)); P — Punter; LS — Long snapper; RS — Return specialist (Note: Includes kickoff and punt returners)

=== Free agency ===
Free agency began on March 17. Notable players to change teams included:

- Quarterbacks Andy Dalton (Dallas to Chicago), Ryan Fitzpatrick (Miami to Washington), and Mitchell Trubisky (Chicago to Buffalo)
- Running backs Matt Breida (Miami to Buffalo), Tevin Coleman (San Francisco to New York Jets), James Conner (Pittsburgh to Arizona), Kenyan Drake (Arizona to Las Vegas), Wayne Gallman (New York Giants to San Francisco), Mark Ingram II (Baltimore to Houston), Phillip Lindsay (Denver to Houston), and Damien Williams (Kansas City to Chicago)
- Wide receivers Nelson Agholor (Las Vegas to New England), John Brown (Buffalo to Las Vegas), Corey Davis (Tennessee to New York Jets), Will Fuller (Houston to Miami), A. J. Green (Cincinnati to Arizona), Kenny Golladay (Detroit to New York Giants), Marvin Jones (Detroit to Jacksonville), Cordarrelle Patterson (Chicago to Atlanta), Curtis Samuel (Carolina to Washington), Emmanuel Sanders (New Orleans to Buffalo), and Sammy Watkins (Kansas City to Baltimore)
- Tight ends Jared Cook (New Orleans to Los Angeles Chargers), Hunter Henry (Los Angeles Chargers to New England), Kyle Rudolph (Minnesota to New York Giants), and Jonnu Smith (Tennessee to New England)
- Offensive linemen Pat Elflein (New York Jets to Carolina), Matt Feiler (Pittsburgh to Los Angeles Chargers), Eric Fisher (Kansas City to Indianapolis), Ted Karras (Miami to New England), Corey Linsley (Green Bay to Los Angeles Chargers), Alex Mack (Atlanta to San Francisco), Riley Reiff (Minnesota to Cincinnati), Joe Thuney (New England to Kansas City), Trai Turner (Los Angeles Chargers to Pittsburgh), Alejandro Villanueva (Pittsburgh to Baltimore), and Kevin Zeitler (New York Giants to Baltimore)
- Defensive linemen Jadeveon Clowney (Tennessee to Cleveland), Maliek Collins (Las Vegas to Houston), Trey Hendrickson (New Orleans to Cincinnati), Justin Houston (Indianapolis to Baltimore), Melvin Ingram (Los Angeles Chargers to Pittsburgh), Malik Jackson (Philadelphia to Cleveland), Carl Lawson (Cincinnati to New York Jets), Yannick Ngakoue (Baltimore to Las Vegas), Aldon Smith (Dallas to Seattle), Solomon Thomas (San Francisco to Las Vegas), Dalvin Tomlinson (New York Giants to Minnesota), Carlos Watkins (Houston to Dallas), and J. J. Watt (Houston to Arizona)
- Linebackers Jeremiah Attaochu (Denver to Chicago), Bud Dupree (Pittsburgh to Tennessee), Samson Ebukam (Los Angeles Rams to San Francisco), Kamu Grugier-Hill (Miami to Houston), Matthew Judon (Baltimore to New England), Christian Kirksey (Green Bay to Houston), Keanu Neal (Atlanta to Dallas), Kyle Van Noy (Miami to New England), Denzel Perryman (Los Angeles Chargers to Carolina), Haason Reddick (Arizona to Carolina) and Nick Vigil (Los Angeles Chargers to Minnesota)
- Defensive backs Chidobe Awuzie (Dallas to Cincinnati), A. J. Bouye (Denver to Carolina), Justin Coleman (Detroit to Miami), Ronald Darby (Washington to Denver), Kyle Fuller (Chicago to Denver), Shaquill Griffin (Seattle to Jacksonville), Troy Hill (Los Angeles Rams to Cleveland), Mike Hilton (Pittsburgh to Cincinnati), Malik Hooker (Indianapolis to Dallas), Adoree Jackson (Tennessee to New York Giants), William Jackson III (Cincinnati to Washington), Janoris Jenkins (New Orleans to Tennessee), Rayshawn Jenkins (Los Angeles Chargers to Jacksonville), John Johnson (Los Angeles Rams to Cleveland), Lamarcus Joyner (Las Vegas to New York Jets), Damontae Kazee (Atlanta to Dallas), Desmond King (Tennessee to Houston), Jalen Mills (Philadelphia to New England), and Patrick Peterson (Arizona to Minnesota)
- Kicker Matt Prater (Detroit to Arizona)
- Punters Matt Haack (Miami to Buffalo) and Cameron Johnston (Philadelphia to Houston)

=== Trades ===
The following notable trades were made during the 2021 league year:

- March 17: Detroit traded QB Matthew Stafford to the Los Angeles Rams in exchange for QB Jared Goff, a 2021 third-round selection (No. 101), a 2022 first-round selection, and a 2023 first-round selection.
- March 17: Philadelphia traded QB Carson Wentz to Indianapolis in exchange for a 2021 third-round selection and a conditional 2022 second-round selection.
- March 17: Las Vegas traded C Rodney Hudson and 2021 seventh-round selection to Arizona in exchange for a 2021 third-round selection.
- March 17: New England traded OT Marcus Cannon and 2021 fifth- and sixth-round selections to Houston in exchange for 2021 fourth- and sixth-round selections.
- March 17: Houston traded LB Benardrick McKinney and a 2021 seventh-round selection to Miami in exchange for DE Shaq Lawson and a 2021 sixth-round selection.
- March 17: Las Vegas traded OT Trent Brown and a 2021 fifth-round selection to New England in exchange for a 2021 seventh-round selection.
- April 5: The New York Jets traded QB Sam Darnold to Carolina in exchange for a 2021 sixth-round selection and 2022 second- and fourth-round selections.
- April 23: Baltimore traded OT Orlando Brown Jr., a 2021 second-round selection, and a 2022 sixth-round selection to Kansas City in exchange for 2021 first, third, and fourth-round selections and a 2022 fifth-round selection.
- April 28: Carolina traded QB Teddy Bridgewater to Denver in exchange for a 2021 sixth-round selection.
- May 18: Philadelphia traded CB Jameson Houston and a 2023 sixth-round selection to Jacksonville in exchange for CB Josiah Scott.
- June 6: Atlanta traded WR Julio Jones and a 2023 sixth-round selection to Tennessee in exchange for a 2022 second-round selection and a 2023 fourth-round selection.
- July 28: Houston traded WR Randall Cobb to Green Bay in exchange for a 2022 sixth-round selection.
- August 12: Jacksonville traded LB Joe Schobert to Pittsburgh in exchange for a 2022 sixth-round selection.
- August 17: Green Bay traded CB Josh Jackson to the New York Giants in exchange for CB Isaac Yiadom.
- August 30: Cincinnati traded C Billy Price to the New York Giants in exchange for DT B. J. Hill.
- August 31: Baltimore traded G Ben Bredeson and a 2022 fifth-round selection to the New York Giants in exchange for a 2022 fourth-round selection and a 2023 seventh-round selection.
- August 31: The New York Jets traded TE Chris Herndon and a 2022 sixth-round selection to Minnesota in exchange for a 2022 fourth-round selection.
- September 8: Houston traded CB Bradley Roby to New Orleans in exchange for a 2022 third-round selection and a conditional 2023 sixth-round selection.
- September 27: Jacksonville traded CB C. J. Henderson and a 2022 fifth-round selection to Carolina in exchange for TE Dan Arnold and a 2022 third-round selection.
- October 6: New England traded CB Stephon Gilmore to Carolina in exchange for a 2023 sixth-round selection.
- October 15: Philadelphia traded TE Zach Ertz to Arizona in exchange for CB Tay Gowan and a 2022 fifth-round selection.
- October 27: Houston traded RB Mark Ingram II to New Orleans in exchange for a 2024 seventh-round selection.
- November 1: Denver traded LB Von Miller to the Los Angeles Rams in exchange for 2022 second- and third-round selections.
- November 2: Pittsburgh traded LB Melvin Ingram to Kansas City in exchange for a 2022 sixth-round selection.
- November 2: Kansas City traded G Laurent Duvernay-Tardif to the New York Jets in exchange for TE Daniel Brown.

=== Retirements ===
Notable retirements

- QB Drew Brees – Thirteen-time Pro Bowler, five-time All-Pro (one first-team, four second-team), two-time Offensive Player of the Year (2008 and 2011), Super Bowl XLIV champion and MVP, 2004 NFL Comeback Player of the Year, and 2006 Walter Payton Man of the Year. Played for the San Diego Chargers and New Orleans during his 20-year career.
- DE Jurrell Casey – Five-time Pro Bowler and one-time second-team All-Pro. Played for Tennessee and Denver during his 10-year career.
- WR Julian Edelman – Three-time Super Bowl champion (XLIX, LI, and LIII) and Super Bowl LIII MVP. Played for New England during his entire 12-year career.
- LB Tamba Hali – Six-time Pro Bowler and two-time second-team All-Pro. Played for Kansas City during his entire 12-year career.
- G Mike Iupati – Four-time Pro Bowler and two-time All-Pro (one first-team, one second-team). Played for San Francisco, Arizona, and Seattle during his 11-year career.
- RB LeSean McCoy – Six-time Pro Bowler, two-time first-team All-Pro, and two-time Super Bowl champion (LIV and LV). Played for Philadelphia, Buffalo, Kansas City and Tampa Bay during his 12-year career.
- C Maurkice Pouncey – Nine-time Pro Bowler and five-time All-Pro (three first-team, two second-team). Played for Pittsburgh during his entire 11-year career.
- C Mike Pouncey – Four-time Pro Bowler. Played for Miami and the Los Angeles Chargers during his 10-year career.
- QB Philip Rivers – Eight-time Pro Bowler and 2013 NFL Comeback Player of the Year. Played for the San Diego/Los Angeles Chargers and Indianapolis during his 17-year career. Rivers later came out of retirement in 2025, rejoining the Colts.
- WR Demaryius Thomas – Five-time Pro Bowler, two-time second-team All-Pro, and Super Bowl 50 champion. Played for Denver, Houston, New England, and the New York Jets during his 10-year career.
- K Adam Vinatieri – Three-time Pro Bowler, three-time first-team All-Pro, four-time Super Bowl champion (XXXVI, XXXVIII, XXXIX, and XLI), and the NFL's all-time leading scorer. Played for New England and Indianapolis during his 24-year career.
- TE Jason Witten – Eleven-time Pro Bowler, four-time All-Pro (two first-team, two second-team), and 2012 Walter Payton Man of the Year. Played for Dallas and Las Vegas during his 17-year career.

Other retirements

- Antoine Bethea
- Morgan Burnett
- Malcolm Butler
- Jake Butt
- Anthony Castonzo
- Anthony Chickillo
- Patrick Chung
- Tyrone Crawford
- Thomas Davis
- Todd Davis
- Patrick DiMarco
- Anthony Fabiano
- Zach Fulton
- Taylor Gabriel
- Marcus Gilbert
- Ted Ginn Jr.
- Ryan Glasgow
- Damon Harrison
- Stephen Hauschka
- Hale Hentges
- Josh Hill
- Kevin Johnson
- Abry Jones
- Johnathan Joseph
- Nick Keizer
- Daniel Kilgore
- Sean Lee
- Alex Lewis
- Dion Lewis
- Joe Looney
- Kyle Love
- Vance McDonald
- Roosevelt Nix
- Greg Olsen
- James Onwualu
- Donald Penn
- Brian Price
- Jordan Reed
- Weston Richburg
- Theo Riddick
- Patrick Robinson
- Jake Rudock
- Bishop Sankey
- Matt Schaub
- Anthony Sherman
- Alex Smith
- Cameron Smith
- Simon Stepaniak
- Alex Tanney
- Kenny Vaccaro
- Jared Veldheer
- Danny Vitale
- T. J. Ward
- Tramon Williams
- Vince Williams
- Derrick Willies
- Luke Willson
- Stefen Wisniewski
- Sam Young
- Anthony Zettel

=== Draft ===
The 2021 NFL draft was held in Cleveland from April 29 to May 1. Jacksonville, by virtue of having the worst record in 2020, held the first overall selection and selected QB Trevor Lawrence out of Clemson.

== Officiating changes ==
The NFL hired Maia Chaka as its second female official (joining Sarah Thomas) and first African-American female official.

NFL Senior Vice President of Officiating Alberto Riveron retired, leaving two other senior vice presidents, Walt Anderson and Perry Fewell, to co-head the NFL's officiating department. Without Riveron, multiple people in the officiating department will be making the final decisions over replay reviews instead of a single person.

Replay official Carl Madsen died on October 24. He was in his 12th season as a replay official, after an extended career as an on-field official.

The following officials were hired:

- Chad Adams (Replay Official)
- Maia Chaka (Line Judge)

== Rule changes ==
The following rule changes were approved at the NFL Owner's Meeting on April 21:

- The jersey numbering system was modified as follows:
  - Running backs, tight ends, and wide receivers can wear 1–49 and 80–89
  - Defensive backs can wear 1–49
  - Linebackers can wear 1–59 and 90–99
  - The following remained unchanged: offensive linemen (50–79); defensive linemen (50–79, 90–99); and quarterbacks, punters, and kickers (1–19).
  - Per the league's existing rules, any player who changed his number this season was required to buy out the inventory of his existing jersey before the change was made. A player who intends to change his number for the 2022 season can do so without cost.
- Overtime in preseason games was eliminated. This was the first season since 1973 in which overtime was not used in the preseason.
- All accepted penalties by either team during consecutive extra point or two-point conversion attempts are to be enforced.
- The penalty for a second forward pass from behind the line of scrimmage and for a pass thrown after the ball returns behind the line will now include a loss of down.
- During kickoffs, the receiving team may have no more than nine players in the "set-up zone" (the area between 10 and 25 yards from the kickoff spot).
- An expansion of the booth-to-official communication on replays, allowing replay officials to advise on "specific, objective aspects of a play when clear and obvious video evidence is present and/or to address game administration issues."

=== COVID-19 protocols ===
The league introduced COVID-19 protocols intended to encourage vaccination among team players, coaches, and staff. On July 22, the NFL sent a memo that warned teams that if the league could not find a suitable rescheduling date within the 18-week season schedule for postponed games due to COVID-19 outbreaks among unvaccinated players, the team responsible for the outbreak would be charged with a loss by forfeit. They would have also been required to financially compensate to the other team, since teams typically do not get paid for cancelled games. On July 24, it was reported that the league would fine players $14,650 for each COVID-19 protocol violation if they were unvaccinated.

On July 23, the league announced the following temporary rules for 2020 would remain in place for 2021, allowing roster flexibility due to uncertainty regarding the pandemic.

- A player on injured reserve could return after missing three games, instead of the normal eight.
- Teams could return an unlimited number of players from injured reserve throughout the year, instead of the normal limit of three.
- Practice squads could include up to 16 players for each team, up from 12.
- After 4:00 p.m. ET on the Tuesday of a game week, a team could designate up to four practice squad players as "protected", meaning they are not allowed to sign with another team until after their current team plays its next game.
- Up to two practice squad players could be elevated to the active roster each game week without removing any current players, 4:00 p.m. ET the day before a game.

On August 30, the league and the National Football League Players Association (NFLPA) agreed to COVID testing protocols for the season. Fully vaccinated players were tested at least once per week and could opt for additional testing. Like in 2020, unvaccinated players were tested every day during the regular season and postseason except game days.

== 2021 deaths ==
=== Pro Football Hall of Fame members ===
Curley Culp
Culp played 14 NFL seasons at defensive tackle for Kansas City, the Houston Oilers, and Detroit, winning Super Bowl IV with Kansas City. He was inducted into the Hall of Fame in 2013. He died on November 27, age 75.
Sam Huff
Huff played 13 seasons in the NFL as a linebacker with the New York Giants and Washington, and was inducted into the Hall of Fame in 1982. He died November 13, age 87.
Claude Humphrey
Humphrey played 14 seasons in the NFL as a defensive end with Atlanta and Philadelphia, and was inducted into the Hall of Fame in 2014. He died on December 3, age 77.
Floyd Little
Little spent all nine seasons in the NFL as a running back with Denver and was inducted into the Hall of Fame in 2010. He died January 1, age 78.
John Madden
Madden coached Oakland for 10 seasons, winning Super Bowl XI. He was inducted into the Hall of Fame in 2006. He died December 28, age 85.
Mick Tingelhoff
Tingelhoff spent all 17 seasons in the NFL as a center with Minnesota and was inducted into the Hall of Fame in 2015. He died September 11, age 81.

=== Others ===
- Phillip Adams
- Patrick Allen
- Buddy Alliston
- Art Anderson
- Otis Anderson Jr.
- Lionel Antoine
- Fred Arbanas
- Otis Armstrong
- Jon Arnett
- Rick Arrington
- Ted Bates
- Jim Beirne
- Jim Bertelsen
- Ron Botchan
- Harold Bradley Jr.
- Rod Breedlove
- Colt Brennan
- Roger Brown
- Warren Bryant
- Ronnie Burgess
- Jerry Burns
- Bill Byrne
- Ken Casanega
- Howard Carson
- David Carter
- Greg Clark
- Ken Clark
- Junior Coffey
- Fred Cone
- Mike Connelly
- Claude Crabb
- Neal Craig
- Irv Cross
- Sam Cunningham
- Eldon Danenhauer
- Art Davis
- Bruce Davis
- Mike Davis
- Dean Derby
- Ray Don Dillon
- Terry Donahue
- Ben Dreith
- Speedy Duncan
- Hicham El-Mashtoub
- Clyde Emrich
- Josh Evans
- Jim Fassel
- George Fleming
- Fred Ford
- Fred Forsberg
- Mo Forte
- Glenn Foster
- Dennis Franks
- Alex Gibbs
- Bill Glass
- Tony Guillory
- Courtney Hall
- Jon Hameister-Ries
- Parys Haralson
- Len Hauss
- Nate Hawkins
- Geno Hayes
- Hessley Hempstead
- Steve Hendrickson
- Mike Henry
- Steve Henry
- Bob Houmard
- Floyd Hudlow
- Gordon Hudson
- Tunch Ilkin
- Gerald Irons
- Calvin Jackson
- Vincent Jackson
- Harry Jacobs
- Al Jamison
- Charlie Johnson
- Darrius Johnson
- Herb Johnson
- Calvin Jones
- Leroy Jones
- Tony Jones
- Carlos Joseph
- Leroy Keyes
- Greg Knapp
- Charlie Krueger
- Stan Kwan
- Pete Lammons
- Roger LeClerc
- Tim Lester
- Mike Lucci
- Red Mack
- Dave Magazu
- John Marshall
- Eugene Marve
- Archie Matsos
- Tom Matte
- Keith McCants
- Frank McRae
- John Mendenhall
- Art Michalik
- Rich Milot
- Dicky Moegle
- Rick Mohr
- Randy Moore
- Spain Musgrove
- Bob Newland
- Louis Nix
- Freddie Joe Nunn
- Wayne Nunnely
- Bill O'Connor
- Craig Ogletree
- Steve Ortmayer
- Don Parrish
- Bob Pascal
- Alan Pastrana
- David Patten
- John Pease
- Lonnie Perrin
- Mark Pike
- Cyril Pinder
- Mike Pitts
- Jerry Planutis
- Warren Powers
- Gene Prebola
- Vince Promuto
- Palmer Pyle
- Willie Quinnie
- Butch Reed
- Floyd Reese
- George Reihner
- Steve Riley
- John Roach
- J. D. Roberts
- Floyd Sagely
- Paul Salata
- Ron Saul
- Pete Schabarum
- Dick Schafrath
- Henry Schmidt
- Howard Schnellenberger
- Marty Schottenheimer
- Chris Schultz
- Bo Scott
- Willie Scott
- Bill Searcey
- Mike Sensibaugh
- Lin-J Shell
- Jim Shofner
- Steve Smith
- Ray Snell
- Cecil Souders
- Willie Spencer
- Dick Steere
- Don Stonesifer
- Pat Studstill
- Larry Swider
- Dick Szymanski
- Joe Taffoni
- Demaryius Thomas
- Lynn Thomas
- Leonard Thompson
- Ted Thompson
- Rusty Tillman
- Tuufuli Uperesa
- Joe Walton
- Dave Washington
- Lorenzo Washington
- Russ Washington
- Harvey White
- Doug Wilkerson
- Dick Witcher
- Fred Wyant
- Roger Zatkoff
- Connie Zelencik

== Preseason ==
Training camps were held from late July through August.

The Pro Football Hall of Fame Game was played on August 5, as Pittsburgh defeated Dallas. The two teams were previously scheduled to play the 2020 game before it was canceled due to the COVID-19 pandemic.

Corresponding with the expansion of the regular season to 17 games, the preseason was reduced to three games per team. NFC teams each hosted two preseason games and AFC teams each hosted one. There was a league-wide bye week the weekend of September 4–5, between the final preseason game and the start of the regular season.

The August 28 game between Arizona and New Orleans was canceled due to Hurricane Ida. This was only the second time severe weather canceled a preseason game (a 2017 Dallas–Houston game was canceled due to Hurricane Harvey).

== Regular season ==
The NFL released its regular season schedule on May 12. The season was played over an 18-week schedule beginning on September 9. Each of the league's 32 teams plays 17 games, with one bye week for each team. The regular season concluded on January 9, 2022; all games during the final weekend were intra-division games, as it has been since 2010.

The 2020 collective bargaining agreement (CBA) signed by team owners and the NFLPA allowed for an expansion of the regular season from 16 to 17 games. On March 30, 2021, owners approved the expanded schedule. The extra game was added to the existing scheduling formula. Each team continues to play the other three teams in its own division twice, one game against each of the four teams from a division in its own conference, one game against each of the four teams from a division in the other conference, and one game against each of the remaining two teams in its conference that finished in the same position in their respective divisions the previous season (e.g., the team that finished fourth in its division would play all three other teams in its conference that also finished fourth in their divisions).

The added game is a fifth interconference matchup between divisions that had played each other two years earlier, based on the position in their respective divisions the previous season (e.g. the team that finished fourth in its division plays a club that finished fourth in a division of the other conference). AFC teams host the extra game in odd-numbered years, including 2021, with NFC teams getting the extra home game in even-numbered years.

The division pairings for 2021 are as follows:

Four intra-conference games
AFC East vs AFC South
AFC North vs AFC West
NFC East vs NFC South
NFC West vs NFC North

Four inter-conference games
AFC East vs NFC South
AFC North vs NFC North
AFC South vs NFC West
AFC West vs NFC East

Added game
NFC East at AFC East
NFC West at AFC North
NFC South at AFC South
NFC North at AFC West

Highlights of the 2021 season include:

- NFL Kickoff Game: The 2021 season began with the Kickoff Game on Thursday, September 9 with Dallas at defending Super Bowl LV champion Tampa Bay . Tampa Bay won the game.
- NFL London Games: Two games were played at Tottenham Hotspur Stadium in London in 2021: New York Jets at Atlanta on October 10 and Miami at Jacksonville on October 17, with Atlanta and Jacksonville winning. The games started at 9:30 am EDT (2:30 pm BST). These games marked the return to international play after previous season's international games were canceled due to the COVID-19 pandemic and the resulting overseas travel restrictions.
- Thanksgiving: As has been the case since 2006, three games were scheduled for Thursday, November 25: Chicago at Detroit and Las Vegas at Dallas in the traditional daytime doubleheader, and Buffalo at New Orleans for the nightcap, with Chicago, Las Vegas, and Buffalo winning.
- Christmas Day: Two games were scheduled for Christmas Day, which landed on a Saturday in 2021: Cleveland at Green Bay as a late-afternoon game, and Indianapolis at Arizona in primetime, with Green Bay and Indianapolis winning.

=== Scheduling changes ===
This section lists games that were moved or canceled because of severe weather, COVID-19 outbreaks, by way of flexible scheduling, or for other reasons, including games that were moved to Saturday. When the entire season schedule was released on May 12, the league announced that in Weeks 15 and 18, two games would be moved to their respective Saturdays.

- Week 1: Due to damage caused by Hurricane Ida in the New Orleans metropolitan area, the Green Bay–New Orleans game was moved to Jacksonville's TIAA Bank Field.
- Week 12: The Atlanta–Jacksonville game, originally scheduled at 1:00 p.m. ET on CBS, was cross-flexed to Fox, remaining at 1:00.
- Week 13:

- The Denver–Kansas City game, originally scheduled at 1:00 p.m. ET on CBS, was flexed into NBC Sunday Night Football at 8:20 p.m. ET, replacing the originally scheduled San Francisco–Seattle game, which was flexed to 4:25 p.m. on CBS.
- The Los Angeles Chargers–Cincinnati game, originally scheduled at 1:00 p.m. ET on Fox, was cross-flexed to CBS, remaining at 1:00.
- The Jacksonville–Los Angeles Rams game, originally scheduled for 4:25 p.m. ET on CBS was flexed to 4:05 p.m. ET on Fox.

- Week 14:

- The New Orleans–New York Jets game, originally scheduled at 1:00 p.m. ET on Fox, was cross-flexed to CBS, remaining at 1:00.
- The San Francisco–Cincinnati game, originally scheduled at 1:00 p.m. ET on CBS, was flexed to 4:25 p.m ET, still on CBS.

- Week 15:

- On November 23, the NFL announced that two games would be moved to Saturday, December 18: Las Vegas–Cleveland at 4:30 p.m. ET and New England–Indianapolis at 8:15 p.m. ET, both exclusively on the NFL Network (though the Las Vegas-Cleveland game was later moved to Monday, December 20 due to a COVID-19 outbreak among Cleveland players). The three other games that the league had the option of scheduling on Saturday (Carolina–Buffalo, New York Jets–Miami, and Washington–Philadelphia), remained on Sunday, December 19 (though the Washington-Philadelphia game was delayed to Tuesday, December 21 due to a COVID-19 outbreak by Washington).
- The Green Bay–Baltimore game, originally scheduled at 1:00 p.m. ET on Fox, was flexed to 4:25 p.m ET, still on Fox.
- The Las Vegas–Cleveland game, originally scheduled for Saturday at 4:30 p.m. ET, was moved to Monday at 5:00 PM ET, remaining on the NFL Network, due to an outbreak of COVID-19 among Cleveland.
- The Philadelphia–Washington game, originally scheduled for 1:00 p.m. ET on Fox, was moved to Tuesday at 7:00 p.m. ET, remaining on Fox, due to an outbreak of COVID-19 among Washington.
- The Los Angeles Rams–Seattle game, originally scheduled for 4:25 p.m. ET on Fox, was moved to Tuesday at 7:00 p.m. ET, remaining on Fox, due to an outbreak of COVID-19 among Los Angeles.

- Week 17:

- The Los Angeles Rams–Baltimore game, originally scheduled at 4:25 p.m. ET on Fox, was flexed to 1:00 p.m. ET, still on Fox.
- The Carolina–New Orleans game, originally scheduled at 1:00 p.m. ET on Fox, was flexed to 4:25 p.m ET, still on Fox.
- The Arizona–Dallas game, originally scheduled at 1:00 p.m. ET on Fox, was flexed to 4:25 p.m. ET, still on Fox.
- The Las Vegas–Indianapolis game, originally scheduled at 1:00 p.m. ET on CBS, was cross-flexed to Fox, remaining at 1:00.

- Week 18:

- For the first time in league history, two games with playoff implications were moved to the last Saturday of the regular season. This move was announced at the same time as the final Sunday Night Football game on January 2, 2022. The Kansas City–Denver game, originally scheduled for Sunday at 4:25 p.m. ET on CBS, was moved to Saturday at 4:30 p.m. ET on ABC/ESPN, and the Dallas–Philadelphia game, originally scheduled for Sunday at 1:00 p.m. ET on Fox, was moved to Saturday at 8:15 p.m. ET, on ABC/ESPN.
- The Los Angeles Chargers–Las Vegas game, originally scheduled for 4:25 p.m. ET on CBS, was flexed into NBC Sunday Night Football at 8:20 p.m. ET.
- The Cincinnati–Cleveland game, originally scheduled for 1:00 p.m. ET on CBS, was cross-flexed to Fox, remaining at 1:00.
- The New England–Miami game, originally scheduled for 1:00 p.m. ET on CBS, was flexed to 4:25 p.m. ET, still on CBS.
- The New York Jets–Buffalo game, originally scheduled for 1:00 p.m. ET on CBS, was flexed to 4:25 p.m. ET, still on CBS.
- The New Orleans–Atlanta game, originally scheduled for 1:00 p.m. ET on Fox, was flexed to 4:25 p.m. ET, still on Fox.
- The Carolina–Tampa Bay game, originally scheduled for 1:00 p.m. ET on Fox, was cross-flexed to 4:25 p.m. ET on CBS.

== Regular season standings ==
=== Division ===
AFC East
	W	L	T	PCT	DIV	CONF	PF	PA	STK
^{(3)} Buffalo Bills	11	6	0	.647	5–1	7–5	483	289	W4
^{(6)} New England Patriots	10	7	0	.588	3–3	8–4	462	303	L1
Miami Dolphins	9	8	0	.529	4–2	6–6	341	373	W1
New York Jets	4	13	0	.235	0–6	4–8	310	504	L2

AFC North
	W	L	T	PCT	DIV	CONF	PF	PA	STK
^{(4)} Cincinnati Bengals	10	7	0	.588	4–2	8–4	460	376	L1
^{(7)} Pittsburgh Steelers	9	7	1	.559	4–2	7–5	343	398	W2
Cleveland Browns	8	9	0	.471	3–3	5–7	349	371	W1
Baltimore Ravens	8	9	0	.471	1–5	5–7	387	392	L6

AFC South
	W	L	T	PCT	DIV	CONF	PF	PA	STK
^{(1)} Tennessee Titans	12	5	0	.706	5–1	8–4	419	354	W3
Indianapolis Colts	9	8	0	.529	3–3	7–5	451	365	L2
Houston Texans	4	13	0	.235	3–3	4–8	280	452	L2
Jacksonville Jaguars	3	14	0	.176	1–5	3–9	253	457	W1

AFC West
	W	L	T	PCT	DIV	CONF	PF	PA	STK
^{(2)} Kansas City Chiefs	12	5	0	.706	5–1	7–5	480	364	W1
^{(5)} Las Vegas Raiders	10	7	0	.588	3–3	8–4	374	439	W4
Los Angeles Chargers	9	8	0	.529	3–3	6–6	474	459	L1
Denver Broncos	7	10	0	.412	1–5	3–9	335	322	L4

NFC East
	W	L	T	PCT	DIV	CONF	PF	PA	STK
^{(3)} Dallas Cowboys	12	5	0	.706	6–0	10–2	530	358	W1
^{(7)} Philadelphia Eagles	9	8	0	.529	3–3	7–5	444	385	L1
Washington Football Team	7	10	0	.412	2–4	6–6	335	434	W1
New York Giants	4	13	0	.235	1–5	3–9	258	416	L6

NFC North
	W	L	T	PCT	DIV	CONF	PF	PA	STK
^{(1)} Green Bay Packers	13	4	0	.765	4–2	9–3	450	371	L1
Minnesota Vikings	8	9	0	.471	4–2	6–6	425	426	W1
Chicago Bears	6	11	0	.353	2–4	4–8	311	407	L1
Detroit Lions	3	13	1	.206	2–4	3–9	325	467	W1

NFC South
	W	L	T	PCT	DIV	CONF	PF	PA	STK
^{(2)} Tampa Bay Buccaneers	13	4	0	.765	4–2	8–4	511	353	W3
New Orleans Saints	9	8	0	.529	4–2	7–5	364	335	W2
Atlanta Falcons	7	10	0	.412	2–4	4–8	313	459	L2
Carolina Panthers	5	12	0	.294	2–4	3–9	304	404	L7

NFC West
	W	L	T	PCT	DIV	CONF	PF	PA	STK
^{(4)} Los Angeles Rams	12	5	0	.706	3–3	8–4	460	372	L1
^{(5)} Arizona Cardinals	11	6	0	.647	4–2	7–5	449	366	L1
^{(6)} San Francisco 49ers	10	7	0	.588	2–4	7–5	427	365	W2
Seattle Seahawks	7	10	0	.412	3–3	4–8	395	366	W2

=== Conference ===
AFC
#	Team	Division	W	L	T	PCT	DIV	CONF	SOS	SOV	STK
Division winners
1 (Note: Tennessee finished ahead of Kansas City based on head-to-head victory, claiming the No. 1 seed.)	Tennessee Titans	South	12	5	0	.706	5–1	8–4	.472	.480	W3
2	Kansas City Chiefs	West	12	5	0	.706	5–1	7–5	.538	.517	W1
3	Buffalo Bills	East	11	6	0	.647	5–1	7–5	.472	.428	W4
4	Cincinnati Bengals	North	10	7	0	.588	4–2	8–4	.472	.462	L1
Wild cards
5 (Note: Las Vegas claimed the No. 5 seed over New England based on win percentage in common games (5–1 vs. 2–4 against: Miami, Dallas, LA Chargers, Cleveland, and Indianapolis).)	Las Vegas Raiders	West	10	7	0	.588	3–3	8–4	.510	.515	W4
6	New England Patriots	East	10	7	0	.588	3–3	8–4	.481	.394	L1
7	Pittsburgh Steelers	North	9	7	1	.559	4–2	7–5	.521	.490	W2
Did not qualify for the postseason
8 (Note: Indianapolis finished ahead of Miami and Los Angeles based on conference record (7–5 vs. 6–6).)	Indianapolis Colts	South	9	8	0	.529	3–3	7–5	.495	.431	L2
9 (Note: Miami finished ahead of LA Chargers based on win percentage in common games (5–1 vs. 2–4 against: New England, Las Vegas, Houston, Baltimore, and NY Giants).)	Miami Dolphins	East	9	8	0	.529	4–2	6–6	.464	.379	W1
10	Los Angeles Chargers	West	9	8	0	.529	3–3	6–6	.510	.500	L1
11 (Note: Cleveland finished ahead of Baltimore based on division record (3–3 vs. 1–5).)	Cleveland Browns	North	8	9	0	.471	3–3	5–7	.514	.415	W1
12	Baltimore Ravens	North	8	9	0	.471	1–5	5–7	.531	.460	L6
13	Denver Broncos	West	7	10	0	.412	1–5	3–9	.484	.357	L4
14 (Note: NY Jets finished ahead of Houston based on head-to-head victory.)	New York Jets	East	4	13	0	.235	0–6	4–8	.512	.426	L2
15	Houston Texans	South	4	13	0	.235	3–3	4–8	.498	.397	L2
16	Jacksonville Jaguars	South	3	14	0	.176	1–5	3–9	.512	.569	W1
Tiebreakers (Note: When breaking ties for three or more teams under the NFL's rules, they are first broken within divisions, then comparing only the highest-ranked remaining team from each division.)

NFC
#	Team	Division	W	L	T	PCT	DIV	CONF	SOS	SOV	STK
Division winners
1 (Note: Green Bay finished ahead of Tampa Bay based on conference record (9–3 vs. 8–4), claiming the No. 1 seed.)	Green Bay Packers	North	13	4	0	.765	4–2	9–3	.479	.480	L1
2	Tampa Bay Buccaneers	South	13	4	0	.765	4–2	8–4	.467	.443	W3
3 (Note: Dallas claimed the No. 3 seed over LA Rams based on conference record (10–2 vs. 8–4).)	Dallas Cowboys	East	12	5	0	.706	6–0	10–2	.488	.431	W1
4	Los Angeles Rams	West	12	5	0	.706	3–3	8–4	.483	.409	L1
Wild cards
5	Arizona Cardinals	West	11	6	0	.647	4–2	7–5	.490	.492	L1
6	San Francisco 49ers	West	10	7	0	.588	2–4	7–5	.500	.438	W2
7 (Note: Philadelphia finished ahead of New Orleans based on head-to-head victory, claiming the 7th and final playoff spot.)	Philadelphia Eagles	East	9	8	0	.529	3–3	7–5	.469	.350	L1
Did not qualify for the postseason
8	New Orleans Saints	South	9	8	0	.529	4–2	7–5	.512	.516	W2
9	Minnesota Vikings	North	8	9	0	.471	4–2	6–6	.507	.434	W1
10 (Note: Washington finished ahead of Atlanta and Seattle based on head-to-head victories.)	Washington Football Team	East	7	10	0	.412	2–4	6–6	.529	.420	W1
11 (Note: Seattle finished ahead of Atlanta based on win percentage in common games (4–2 vs. 3–3 against: San Francisco, New Orleans, Jacksonville, Washington, and Detroit).)	Seattle Seahawks	West	7	10	0	.412	3–3	4–8	.519	.424	W2
12	Atlanta Falcons	South	7	10	0	.412	2–4	4–8	.472	.315	L2
13	Chicago Bears	North	6	11	0	.353	2–4	4–8	.524	.373	L1
14	Carolina Panthers	South	5	12	0	.294	2–4	3–9	.509	.412	L7
15	New York Giants	East	4	13	0	.235	1–5	3–9	.536	.485	L6
16	Detroit Lions	North	3	13	1	.206	2–4	3–9	.528	.627	W1
Tiebreakers (Note: When breaking ties for three or more teams under the NFL's rules, they are first broken within divisions, then comparing only the highest-ranked remaining team from each division.)

== Postseason ==
The 2021 playoffs began with the wild-card round, with three Wild Card games played in each conference. Wild card weekend took place from January 15–17, 2022. This marks the first time that the wild card games were played over three consecutive days. Two games were played on Saturday, three on Sunday, and one on Monday night, marking the first Monday playoff game since 1988.

In the divisional round, which was played on the weekend of January 22–23, the top seed in the conference played the lowest remaining seed and the other two remaining teams will play each other. The winners of those games advanced to the Conference Championships, which were played on January 30.

Super Bowl LVI was held on February 13 at 6:30 p.m. EST on NBC at SoFi Stadium in Inglewood, California.

=== Bracket ===
Jan 16 – AT&T Stadium	Jan 22 – Lambeau Field
6	San Francisco	23
3	Dallas	17
6	San Francisco	13
Jan 30 – SoFi Stadium
Jan 17 – SoFi Stadium	1	Green Bay	10
NFC
5	Arizona	11	6	San Francisco	17
Jan 23 – Raymond James Stadium
4	LA Rams	34	4	LA Rams	20
NFC Championship
Jan 16 – Raymond James Stadium	4	LA Rams	30
2	Tampa Bay	27
7	Philadelphia	15
Divisional playoffs	Feb 13 – SoFi Stadium
2	Tampa Bay	31
Wild-card round
N4	LA Rams	23
Jan 15 – Paul Brown Stadium	Jan 22 – Nissan Stadium	A4	Cincinnati	20
Super Bowl LVI
5	Las Vegas	19
4	Cincinnati	26
4	Cincinnati	19
Jan 30 – Arrowhead Stadium
Jan 15 – Highmark Stadium	1	Tennessee	16
AFC
6	New England	17	4	Cincinnati	27*
Jan 23 – Arrowhead Stadium
3	Buffalo	47	2	Kansas City	24
AFC Championship
Jan 16 – Arrowhead Stadium	3	Buffalo	36
2	Kansas City	42*
7	Pittsburgh	21
2	Kansas City	42

* Indicates overtime victory

== Records, milestones, and notable statistics ==
Week 1

- Tom Brady became the first player to start 300 career games at any position.
- Jameis Winston passed for 145 yards and five touchdowns, setting the record for fewest passing yards in a game with at least five passing touchdowns. The previous record of 158 yards was held by Eddie LeBaron.

Week 2

- Julio Jones became the fastest player to reach 13,000 receiving yards, doing so in 137 games. The previous record of 154 games was held by Jerry Rice.
- Aaron Rodgers passed John Elway for tenth place on the all-time passing yards list.
- Travis Kelce became the fastest tight end to reach 8,000 receiving yards, doing so in 113 games. The previous record of 120 contests was held by Rob Gronkowski.

Week 3

- Justin Tucker set the NFL record for longest field goal with a 66-yard kick. The previous record of 64 yards was held by Matt Prater.
- Jamal Agnew tied the record for the longest play with a 109-yard return of a missed field goal for a touchdown. The record is now shared with Antonio Cromartie and Cordarrelle Patterson.
- Tom Brady became the second player to record 80,000 passing yards, joining Drew Brees.
- Brady became the most-sacked quarterback in NFL history, breaking Brett Favre's record of 525 times sacked.
- Matt Ryan became the 10th player to record 350 passing touchdowns.
- Patrick Mahomes became the fastest player to reach 15,000 career passing yards, doing so in 49 games. The previous record of 53 games was held by Matthew Stafford.

Week 4

- Ben Roethlisberger became the eighth player to record 400 passing touchdowns.
- Roethlisberger passed Dan Marino for sixth place on the all-time passing yards list.
- Russell Wilson became the 18th quarterback to win 100 career starts.
- Tom Brady became the NFL's all-time passing yards leader, breaking Drew Brees' record of 80,358 yards.
- Brady became the fourth quarterback to defeat all 32 teams, joining Brees, Brett Favre, and Peyton Manning.
- Patrick Mahomes set the records for most passing yards and passing touchdowns in a player's first 50 games with 15,348 and 125, respectively. The previous record of 14,372 yards was held by Kurt Warner. The previous record of 116 touchdowns was held by Marino.
- Andy Reid became the first head coach to win 100 games (regular season and playoffs combined) with two different franchises.
- The Baltimore Ravens had at least 100 rushing yards for the 43rd straight game, tying the 1974–77 Pittsburgh Steelers for the most consecutive such games.

Week 5

- Antonio Brown became the fastest player to reach 900 career receptions, doing so in 143 games. The previous record of 149 games was held by Marvin Harrison.
- Aaron Rodgers passed Dan Marino and Philip Rivers for fifth place on the all-time touchdown passes list.
- Matt Ryan passed Eli Manning for eight place on the all-time passing yards list.
- Ryan became the seventh player to reach 5,000 career completions.
- The Cleveland Browns became the first team in NFL history to lose a game despite scoring 40 or more points and not turning the ball over. Teams with 40-plus points and no turnovers had previously been 442–0.
- League-wide, kickers missed 13 point-after-touchdown attempts, breaking the record for a single week. The previous record of 12 misses was set in week 11 of the 2016 season.

Week 6

- Lamar Jackson set the record for most wins by a starting quarterback before his 25th birthday with his 35th win. The previous record of 34 wins was held by Dan Marino.

Week 7

- Tom Brady became the first player to record 600 career passing touchdowns.
- Matthew Stafford became the 13th player to record 300 career passing touchdowns.

Week 8

- Tom Brady became the second player to complete 7,000 career passes, joining Drew Brees.
- Brady set the record for most games with at least three touchdown passes and most games with at least four touchdown passes with 98 and 38, respectively. Both records were previously held by Brees.
- Mike White set the record for most completions in a first career start with 37.

Week 9

- Josh Hines-Allen became the first player in NFL history to record a sack, interception, and a fumble recovery from a quarterback with the same name Josh Allen.

Week 10

- Bill Belichick became the fourth head coach to win at least 250 games with one team, joining George Halas, Don Shula, and Tom Landry.
- The Tennessee Titans became the second team to win five consecutive games over teams who made the playoffs the previous season, joining the 2003 Philadelphia Eagles.

Week 11

- Jonathan Taylor tied the record for most consecutive games with at least 100 rushing yards and a rushing touchdown with eight. He shares the record with Lydell Mitchell and LaDainian Tomlinson.
- Christian McCaffrey became the fastest player to record 3,000 rushing yards and 3,000 receiving yards, doing so in 57 games. The previous record of 66 games was held by Alvin Kamara.
- Tom Brady became the first player to attempt 11,000 career passes.

Week 12

- Aaron Rodgers passed Philip Rivers for eighth on the all-time wins list for a starting quarterback, with 135.
- Keenan Allen tied the record for fastest player to reach 700 career receptions, doing so in 111 games. He shares the record with Antonio Brown.
- Tom Brady passed Ben Roethlisberger for the third most career game-winning drives with 51.
- Ben Roethlisberger passed Philip Rivers for fifth on the career pass completions list.

Week 13

- Tom Brady and Rob Gronkowski passed Philip Rivers and Antonio Gates for second place on the list of most touchdowns by a passer-receiver duo, with 90.
- Adrian Peterson tied Jim Brown for tenth place on the most total touchdowns list, with 126.
- The Miami Dolphins became the second team in NFL history to win five straight games immediately following a losing streak of seven or more games, joining the 1994 New York Giants.

Week 14

- Tom Brady became the all-time pass completions leader, breaking Drew Brees' record of 7,142 completions.
- Brady became the first player to throw 700 passing touchdowns (regular season and playoffs combined).
- Brady with his 13th career 4,000-yard season, moved to second place in the most 4,000-yard seasons.
- Aaron Rodgers became the fifth player to throw at least 60 touchdown passes against a single opponent, doing so against the Chicago Bears.
- Justin Herbert became the first player to record 30 touchdown passes in each of his first two seasons.
- Herbert set the record for most pass completions by a player in his first two seasons. The previous record of 724 was held by Kyler Murray.
- Josh Allen became the fourth player to pass for 300 yards and run for 100 yards in the same game, joining Lamar Jackson, Cam Newton, and Russell Wilson.

Week 15

- Ben Roethlisberger passed Philip Rivers for fifth place on the all-time passing yards list.
- Tom Brady became the first player to be selected to 15 Pro Bowls. He previously shared the record of 14 with four other players.

Week 16

- Justin Jefferson set the record for most receiving yards in a player's first two seasons, ultimately with 3,016. The previous record of 2,755 yards was held by Odell Beckham Jr.
- Joe Burrow passed for 525 yards, the fourth most passing yards by a player in a single game in NFL history.
- Josh Allen became the first player to record 100 passing touchdowns and 20 rushing touchdowns in his first four seasons.
- Dak Prescott became the first player to throw a touchdown pass to a running back, wide receiver, tight end, and offensive lineman in the same game.
- The Jacksonville-New York Jets game featured two touchdowns scored by offensive linemen. This marked the first time multiple touchdowns were scored by offensive linemen in the same game in NFL history.
- The Miami Dolphins became the first team in NFL history to win seven straight games immediately following a seven-game losing streak.

Week 17

- Ja'Marr Chase set the record for most receiving yards by a rookie in a single game, with 266. The previous record of 255 yards was held by Jerry Butler.
- Chase also set the record for receiving yards by a rookie in a season. The previous record of 1,400 yards was held by Justin Jefferson.
- Tom Brady became the second player to throw 40 touchdown passes in consecutive seasons, joining Drew Brees.
- Josh Allen became the first player to record 100 passing touchdowns and 30 rushing touchdowns in his first four seasons.
- Bill Belichick tied the record for most 10-win seasons by a head coach, with 20. He shares the record with Don Shula.
- Matt LaFleur won his 39th game as a head coach, setting a record for most wins by a head coach in his first three seasons. The previous record of 38 was held by George Seifert.

Week 18

- Travis Kelce became the fastest tight end in NFL history to reach 9,000 receiving yards, doing so in 127 games.
- Tom Brady broke the single season record for pass completions, with 485. The previous record of 471 was held by Drew Brees.
- Brady became the oldest player to lead the league in passing yards and passing touchdowns, at 44 years of age. Brady previously set both records at age 40.
- Brady also became the oldest player to pass for 5,000 yards in a single season, and joined Brees as the only quarterbacks in NFL history with multiple 5,000-yard seasons.
- T. J. Watt tied the record for most sacks in a season, with 22.5. He shares the record with Michael Strahan.
- Cooper Kupp became the fourth player in NFL history to lead the league in receptions, receiving yards, and receiving touchdowns in the same season, joining Jerry Rice, Sterling Sharpe, and Steve Smith Sr.
- Jaylen Waddle set the record for most receptions by a rookie, with 104. The previous record of 101 was held by Anquan Boldin.
- Mike Evans became the first player in NFL history to have 1,000 receiving yards in each of his first eight seasons.
- Justin Herbert set the record for most touchdown passes in a player's first two seasons, with 69. The previous record of 68 was held by Dan Marino.
- Rob Gronkowski set the record for most games with 100 receiving yards by a tight end, with 32. The previous record of 31 was held by Tony Gonzalez.
- The Las Vegas Raiders set the record for most wins on the final play of a game, with six.

Wild Card Round

- The Buffalo Bills became the first team in NFL history to complete a game without any punts, turnovers, or field goal attempts.

Divisional Round

- Ja'Marr Chase became the first rookie to have multiple 100-yard receiving games in the postseason.
- Gabe Davis set the record for most receiving touchdowns in a playoff game, with four. The previous record of three was shared by 16 players.
- Josh Allen and Patrick Mahomes became the first opposing quarterbacks to each pass for at least 300 yards, three touchdowns, and no interceptions, and rush for at least 50 yards in the same game.

Conference Championships:

- Evan McPherson tied the record for most playoff games with at least four field goals, with three. He shares the record with Adam Vinatieri.
- McPherson set the record for most field goals by a rookie in the playoffs, ultimately with 14. The previous record of 8 was held by Stephen Gostkowski.

Super Bowl LVI

- Evan McPherson tied the record for most field goals in a single postseason, with 14. He shares the record with Adam Vinatieri.
- Von Miller tied the record for most career sacks in the Super Bowl, with 4.5. He shares the record with Charles Haley.
- Sean McVay became the youngest head coach to ever win a Super Bowl, at 36 years, 20 days of age. The previous record of 36 years, 323 days was held by Mike Tomlin.
- The Los Angeles Rams tied the record for most sacks in a Super Bowl, with seven. They share the record with the 1975 Pittsburgh Steelers, 1985 Chicago Bears, and 2015 Denver Broncos.

== Regular-season statistical leaders ==
Individual
Scoring leader	Nick Folk	New England	150
Scoring leader	Daniel Carlson	Las Vegas	150
Most field goals made	Daniel Carlson	Las Vegas	40
Touchdowns	Austin Ekeler	Los Angeles Chargers	20
Touchdowns	Jonathan Taylor	Indianapolis	20
Rushing yards	Jonathan Taylor	Indianapolis	1,811
Passing yards	Tom Brady	Tampa Bay	5,316
Passing touchdowns	Tom Brady	Tampa Bay	43
Interceptions thrown	Matthew Stafford	Los Angeles Rams	17
Interceptions thrown	Trevor Lawrence	Jacksonville	17
Passer rating	Aaron Rodgers	Green Bay	111.9
Pass receptions	Cooper Kupp	Los Angeles Rams	145
Pass receiving yards	Cooper Kupp	Los Angeles Rams	1,947
Combined tackles	Foye Oluokun	Atlanta	192
Interceptions	Trevon Diggs	Dallas	11
Punting	Cameron Johnston	Houston	4,108; avg 47.2
Sacks	T. J. Watt	Pittsburgh	22.5

== Awards ==
=== Individual season awards ===
The 11th Annual NFL Honors, saluting the best players and plays from 2021 season, was held on February 10, 2022, at the YouTube Theater in Inglewood, California.

Award	Winner	Position	Team
AP Most Valuable Player	Aaron Rodgers	QB	Green Bay
AP Offensive Player of the Year	Cooper Kupp	WR	Los Angeles Rams
AP Defensive Player of the Year	T. J. Watt	LB	Pittsburgh
AP Coach of the Year	Mike Vrabel	HC	Tennessee
AP Assistant Coach of the Year	Dan Quinn	DC	Dallas
AP Offensive Rookie of the Year	Ja'Marr Chase	WR	Cincinnati
AP Defensive Rookie of the Year	Micah Parsons	LB	Dallas
AP Comeback Player of the Year	Joe Burrow	QB	Cincinnati
Pepsi Rookie of the Year	Ja'Marr Chase	WR	Cincinnati
Walter Payton NFL Man of the Year	Andrew Whitworth	OT	Los Angeles Rams
PFWA NFL Executive of the Year	Bill Belichick	HC/GM	New England
Super Bowl Most Valuable Player	Cooper Kupp	WR	Los Angeles Rams

=== All-Pro team ===
The following players were named First Team All-Pro by the Associated Press:

Offense
QB	Aaron Rodgers (Green Bay)
RB	Jonathan Taylor (Indianapolis)
WR	Davante Adams (Green Bay); Cooper Kupp (Los Angeles Rams); Deebo Samuel (San Francisco)
TE	Mark Andrews (Baltimore)
LT	Trent Williams (San Francisco)
LG	Joel Bitonio (Cleveland)
C	Jason Kelce (Philadelphia)
RG	Zack Martin (Dallas)
RT	Tristan Wirfs (Tampa Bay)

Defense
DE	T. J. Watt (Pittsburgh); Myles Garrett (Cleveland)
DT	Aaron Donald (Los Angeles Rams); Cameron Heyward (Pittsburgh)
LB	Micah Parsons (Dallas); Shaquille Leonard (Indianapolis); De'Vondre Campbell (Green Bay)
CB	Trevon Diggs (Dallas); Jalen Ramsey (Los Angeles Rams)
S	Kevin Byard (Tennessee); Jordan Poyer (Buffalo)

Special teams
K	Justin Tucker (Baltimore)
P	A. J. Cole (Las Vegas)
KR	Braxton Berrios (New York Jets)
PR	Devin Duvernay (Baltimore)
ST	J. T. Gray (New Orleans)
LS	Luke Rhodes (Indianapolis)

=== Players of the week/month ===
The following were named the top performers during the 2021 season:

Week/ Month	Offensive Player of the Week/Month		Defensive Player of the Week/Month		Special Teams Player of the Week/Month	
Week/ Month	AFC	NFC	AFC	NFC	AFC	NFC
1	Patrick Mahomes QB (Kansas City)	Matthew Stafford QB (LA Rams)	Maxx Crosby DE (Las Vegas)	Chandler Jones LB (Arizona)	Evan McPherson K (Cincinnati)	Bradley Pinion P (Tampa Bay)
2	Derrick Henry RB (Tennessee)	Kyler Murray QB (Arizona)	Odafe Oweh LB (Baltimore)	Mike Edwards S (Tampa Bay)	Daniel Carlson K (Las Vegas)	Mitch Wishnowsky P (San Francisco)
3	Josh Allen QB (Buffalo)	Matthew Stafford QB (LA Rams)	Myles Garrett DE (Cleveland)	Byron Murphy CB (Arizona)	Justin Tucker K (Baltimore)	Mason Crosby K (Green Bay)
Sept.	Derek Carr QB (Las Vegas)	Cooper Kupp WR (LA Rams)	Von Miller LB (Denver)	Trevon Diggs CB (Dallas)	Jamal Agnew WR/KR (Jacksonville)	Mitch Wishnowsky P (San Francisco)
4	Joe Burrow QB (Cincinnati)	Daniel Jones QB (NY Giants)	Tremaine Edmunds LB (Buffalo)	Trevon Diggs CB (Dallas)	Rigoberto Sanchez P (Indianapolis)	DeAndre Carter WR/KR (Washington)
5	Lamar Jackson QB (Baltimore)	Tom Brady QB (Tampa Bay)	Gregory Rousseau DE (Buffalo)	Marshon Lattimore CB (New Orleans)	Nick Folk K (New England)	T. J. Edwards LB (Philadelphia)
6	Derrick Henry RB (Tennessee)	Dak Prescott QB (Dallas)	T. J. Watt LB (Pittsburgh)	Taylor Rapp S (LA Rams)	Matthew Wright K (Jacksonville)	Matt Prater K (Arizona)
7	Ja'Marr Chase WR (Cincinnati)	Alvin Kamara RB (New Orleans)	Yannick Ngakoue DE (Las Vegas)	Deion Jones LB (Atlanta)	Rigoberto Sanchez P (Indianapolis)	Graham Gano K (NY Giants)
8	Mike White QB (NY Jets)	Deebo Samuel WR (San Francisco)	Adrian Phillips S (New England)	Micah Parsons LB (Dallas)	Randy Bullock K (Tennessee)	Zane Gonzalez K (Carolina)
Oct.	Jonathan Taylor RB (Indianapolis)	Cooper Kupp WR (LA Rams)	Kevin Byard S (Tennessee)	De'Vondre Campbell LB (Green Bay)	Tyler Bass K (Buffalo)	Blake Gillikin P (New Orleans)
9	Justin Herbert QB (LA Chargers)	Matt Ryan QB (Atlanta)	Josh Allen DE (Jacksonville)	Xavier McKinney S (NY Giants)	Tommy Townsend P (Kansas City)	Kene Nwangwu RB/KR (Minnesota)
10	Patrick Mahomes QB (Kansas City)	Deebo Samuel WR (San Francisco)	Xavien Howard CB (Miami)	Darius Slay CB (Philadelphia)	E. J. Speed LB (Indianapolis)	Zane Gonzalez K (Carolina)
11	Jonathan Taylor RB (Indianapolis)	Justin Jefferson WR (Minnesota)	Chris Jones DT (Kansas City)	Chandler Jones LB (Arizona)	Evan McPherson K (Cincinnati)	Jake Elliott K (Philadelphia)
12	Joe Mixon RB (Cincinnati)	Leonard Fournette RB (Tampa Bay)	Patrick Surtain II CB (Denver)	Rasul Douglas CB (Green Bay)	Daniel Carlson K (Las Vegas)	Thomas Morstead P (Atlanta)
Nov.	Jonathan Taylor RB (Indianapolis)	Justin Jefferson WR (Minnesota)	J. C. Jackson CB (New England)	Robert Quinn LB (Chicago)	Tommy Townsend P (Kansas City)	Jake Elliott K (Philadelphia)
13	Justin Herbert QB (LA Chargers)	Jared Goff QB (Detroit)	T. J. Watt LB (Pittsburgh)	Jordan Hicks LB (Arizona)	Michael Palardy P (Miami)	Travis Homer RB/KR (Seattle)
14	Justin Herbert QB (LA Chargers)	George Kittle TE (San Francisco)	Mike Hughes CB (Kansas City)	Aaron Donald DT (LA Rams)	Brandon McManus K (Denver)	Jakeem Grant WR/KR (Chicago)
15	Travis Kelce TE (Kansas City)	Aaron Rodgers QB (Green Bay)	Shaquille Leonard LB (Indianapolis)	Cameron Jordan DE (New Orleans)	Tremon Smith CB/KR (Houston)	Riley Patterson K (Detroit)
16	Joe Burrow QB (Cincinnati)	Dak Prescott QB (Dallas)	Tavierre Thomas CB (Houston)	Foyesade Oluokun LB (Atlanta)	Braxton Berrios WR/KR (NY Jets)	Brandon Powell WR/KR (LA Rams)
Dec.	Patrick Mahomes QB (Kansas City)	Aaron Rodgers QB (Green Bay)	Jerome Baker LB (Miami)	Aaron Donald DT (LA Rams)	Evan McPherson K (Cincinnati)	Thomas Morstead P (Atlanta)
17	Ja'Marr Chase WR (Cincinnati)	Rashaad Penny RB (Seattle)	T. J. Watt LB (Pittsburgh)	Cameron Jordan DE (New Orleans)	Daniel Carlson K (Las Vegas)	Matt Prater K (Arizona)
18	Ryan Tannehill QB (Tennessee)	Dak Prescott QB (Dallas)	Maxx Crosby DE (Las Vegas)	Tracy Walker S (Detroit)	Daniel Carlson K (Las Vegas)	Robbie Gould K (San Francisco)

Week	FedEx Air Player of the Week	FedEx Ground Player of the Week	Pepsi Zero Sugar Rookie of the Week
1	Tom Brady (Tampa Bay)	Joe Mixon (Cincinnati)	Ja'Marr Chase WR (Cincinnati)
2	Tom Brady (Tampa Bay)	Derrick Henry (Tennessee)	Asante Samuel Jr. CB (LA Chargers)
3	Justin Herbert (LA Chargers)	Derrick Henry (Tennessee)	Asante Samuel Jr. CB (LA Chargers)
4	Joe Burrow (Cincinnati)	Ezekiel Elliott (Dallas)	Zach Wilson QB (NY Jets)
5	Justin Herbert (LA Chargers)	Derrick Henry (Tennessee)	Ja'Marr Chase WR (Cincinnati)
6	Dak Prescott (Dallas)	Jonathan Taylor (Indianapolis)	Ja'Marr Chase WR (Cincinnati)
7	Joe Burrow (Cincinnati)	D'Ernest Johnson (Cleveland)	Ja'Marr Chase WR (Cincinnati)
8	Mike White (NY Jets)	Elijah Mitchell (San Francisco)	Micah Parsons LB (Dallas)
9	Justin Herbert (LA Chargers)	Nick Chubb (Cleveland)	Javonte Williams RB (Denver)
10	Dak Prescott (Dallas)	Jonathan Taylor (Indianapolis)	Micah Parsons LB (Dallas)
11	Justin Herbert (LA Chargers)	Joe Mixon (Cincinnati)	Elijah Moore WR (NY Jets)
12	Dak Prescott (Dallas)	Joe Mixon (Cincinnati)	Patrick Surtain II CB (Denver)
13	Justin Herbert (LA Chargers)	Jonathan Taylor (Indianapolis)	Zach Wilson QB (NY Jets)
14	Justin Herbert (LA chargers)	Dalvin Cook (Minnesota)	Micah Parsons LB (Dallas)
15	Jared Goff (Detroit)	Jonathan Taylor (Indianapolis)	Brandin Echols CB (NY Jets)
16	Joe Burrow (Cincinnati)	Rex Burkhead (Houston)	Zach Wilson QB (NY Jets)
17	Joe Burrow (Cincinnati)	Rashaad Penny (Seattle)	Ja'Marr Chase WR (Cincinnati)
18	Tom Brady (Tampa Bay)	Rashaad Penny (Seattle)	Amon-Ra St. Brown WR (Detroit)
POY	Tom Brady (Tampa Bay)	Jonathan Taylor (Indianapolis)	Ja'Marr Chase WR (Cincinnati)

Month	Rookie of the Month	
Month	Offensive	Defensive
Sept.	Ja'Marr Chase WR (Cincinnati)	Asante Samuel Jr. CB (LA Chargers)
Oct.	Najee Harris RB (Pittsburgh)	Nick Bolton LB (Kansas City)
Nov.	Mac Jones QB (New England)	Micah Parsons LB (Dallas)
Dec.	Amon-Ra St. Brown WR (Detroit)	Micah Parsons LB (Dallas)

== Head coaching and front office changes ==
=== Head coaches ===
==== Offseason ====
Team	Departing coach	Interim coach	Incoming coach	Reason for leaving	Notes
Atlanta Falcons	Dan Quinn	Raheem Morris	Arthur Smith	Fired	After a 0–5 start, Quinn was fired on October 11, 2020. He had a 43–42 (.506) record during his 5-plus-season tenure with the Falcons, with two playoff appearances including one Super Bowl appearance. Morris, the team's defensive coordinator, was previously the head coach of the Tampa Bay Buccaneers, with a record of 17–31 (.354) and no playoff appearances. He finished out the 2020 season with a 4–7 (.364) record. Smith served as an assistant coach for the Tennessee Titans from 2011 to 2020 and most recently served as offensive coordinator for the last two seasons; the Falcons hired Smith on January 16. This would be his first NFL head coaching job.
Detroit Lions	Matt Patricia	Darrell Bevell	Dan Campbell	Fired	Patricia was fired on November 28, 2020. He had a 13–29–1 (.314) record during his 2-plus-season tenure with the Lions, with no playoff appearances and finishing both complete seasons in last place in the NFC North. Bevell, the team's offensive coordinator, was promoted to interim head coach. This was his first head coaching position. He finished out the 2020 season with a 1–4 (.200) record. Campbell, who had a 5–7 (.417) record as interim head coach of the Miami Dolphins for part of 2015, was hired on January 20. He previously served as the assistant head coach/tight ends coach of the New Orleans Saints from 2016 to 2020.
Houston Texans	Bill O'Brien	Romeo Crennel	David Culley	Fired	After an 0–4 start, O'Brien was fired on October 5, 2020. He had a 52–48 (.520) record during his 6-plus-season tenure with the Texans, with four AFC South titles. Crennel, the team's associate head coach, was previously the head coach of the Cleveland Browns and Kansas City Chiefs, with a combined record of 28–55 (.337) and no playoff appearances. At age 73, he became the oldest head coach in NFL history. He finished out the 2020 season with a 4–8 (.333) record. On January 29, the Texans hired Culley, whom for the last 42 years was an assistant coach for several teams, most recently for the Baltimore Ravens from 2019 to 2020. From 1999 to 2016, Culley served as an assistant coach for the Philadelphia Eagles and Kansas City Chiefs, both coached by Andy Reid. This is his first head coaching job. Culley became the oldest first-time head coach in NFL history at age 65.
Jacksonville Jaguars	Doug Marrone		Urban Meyer	Fired	After 4-plus seasons with a 23–43 (.348) record, Marrone was fired on January 4. The Jaguars made the playoffs once during his tenure, advancing to the AFC Championship Game. They finished 1–15 (.063) in 2020, ending the season on a 15-game losing streak. Meyer, an experienced college football head coach with a combined record of 187–32 (.854) with Bowling Green, Utah, Florida, and Ohio State, and three national championships, was hired on January 14. This would be his first NFL coaching position.
Los Angeles Chargers	Anthony Lynn		Brandon Staley	Fired	Lynn was fired on January 4 after four seasons with the team with a 33–31 (.516) record and one playoff appearance. The Chargers finished 7–9 (.438) in 2020. Staley was hired on January 17. He had spent the previous season as defensive coordinator of the Los Angeles Rams. This was his first head coaching position.
New York Jets	Adam Gase		Robert Saleh	Fired	Gase was fired on January 3 after finishing the 2020 season 2–14 (.125). He was 9–23 (.281) in two seasons with the Jets, with no playoff appearances. Saleh, who was a long-time defensive coach in the NFL and on the college level, was hired on January 14. He was most recently the San Francisco 49ers defensive coordinator from 2017 to 2020. This was his first head coaching position.
Philadelphia Eagles	Doug Pederson		Nick Sirianni	Fired	Pederson was fired on January 11 after 5 seasons with the Eagles, with a total regular season record of 42–37–1 (.531), and a playoff record of 4–2 (.667). His tenure included 3 playoff appearances, 2 NFC East division titles, and a Super Bowl LII title. The Eagles finished 4–11–1 (.281) in 2020. Former Indianapolis Colts offensive coordinator Nick Sirianni was hired as Eagles' head coach on January 24. This marked Sirianni's first head coaching job.

==== In-season ====
Team	Departing coach	Reason for leaving	Interim replacement	Notes
Jacksonville Jaguars	Urban Meyer	Fired	Darrell Bevell	Meyer was fired on December 15 due to a season full of on- and off-the-field issues. During Meyer's single partial season in Jacksonville, the Jaguars were 2–11 (.154). Meyer became the first coach to not finish their first season as head coach since Bobby Petrino resigned in 2007 with the Atlanta Falcons (the last coach to be fired before completing their first season was Pete McCulley in 1978 with the San Francisco 49ers). Bevell, the team's offensive coordinator since 2021, was promoted to interim head coach. This is his second head coaching position, after serving as interim head coach for the Detroit Lions in 2020, with a record of 1–4 (.200) and no playoff appearances.
Las Vegas Raiders	Jon Gruden	Resigned	Rich Bisaccia	Gruden resigned due to the publication of controversial emails sent prior to becoming the Raiders head coach. In Gruden's 3-plus seasons during his second stint with Oakland/Las Vegas, the Raiders were 22–31 (.415) with no playoff appearances. Bisaccia, the team's special teams coordinator and assistant head coach since 2018, was promoted to interim head coach. This is his first head coaching position after 20 years as an assistant coach in the NFL.

=== Front office personnel ===
==== Off-season ====
Team	Position	Departing office holder	Interim replacement	Incoming office holder	Reason for leaving	Notes
Atlanta Falcons	General manager	Thomas Dimitroff	none	Terry Fontenot	Fired	After an 0–5 start, Dimitroff was fired on October 11, 2020, after 12 seasons. Fontenot was hired on January 18. He spent previous 18 seasons with the New Orleans Saints organization, most recently as vice president/assistant general manager of pro personnel.
Carolina Panthers	General manager	Marty Hurney	none	Scott Fitterer	Fired	Hurney was fired on December 21, 2020, after 14-plus seasons in two stints (2002–12, 2017–20). In his time with the Panthers he was responsible for drafting star players such as Cam Newton, Luke Kuechly, and Thomas Davis. Fitterer, former Seattle Seahawks' vice president of football operations, was hired on January 14. He previously served with the Seahawks for 20 seasons in various executive roles.
Denver Broncos	General manager	John Elway		George Paton	Resigned	Elway announced on January 4 that he was stepping down from his role as general manager after 10 years, although he would remain as president of football operations. Paton was hired on January 13. He was previously a member of the Minnesota Vikings organization since 2007. This was his first GM position.
Detroit Lions	General manager	Bob Quinn	by committee	Brad Holmes	Fired	Quinn was fired on November 28, 2020, after five seasons. A combination of front office personnel would handle GM duties for the remainder of the season. On January 14, Holmes was hired as new general manager and executive vice president. He spent last 18 seasons with the Los Angeles Rams and named director of college scouting since 2013.
Houston Texans	General manager	Bill O'Brien	Jack Easterby	Nick Caserio	Fired	O'Brien was named general manager of the team during the 2020 offseason, after splitting general manager duties with Easterby, the executive vice president of football operations, and other team executives in 2019. Easterby took over GM duties for the rest of the season. Caserio was hired on January 7. He was a long-time member of the New England Patriots organization, as an offensive assistant, a scout, and their director of player personnel from 2008 to 2020.
Jacksonville Jaguars	General manager	David Caldwell	Trent Baalke		Fired	Caldwell was fired on November 29, 2020, after eight seasons. Baalke, the team's director of player personnel, would serve as interim GM through the end of the season. Previously, he was the general manager of the San Francisco 49ers from 2011 to 2016. On January 21, 2021, Baalke was named permanent GM.
Washington Football Team	General manager	Ron Rivera (de facto)	none	Martin Mayhew	N/A	After four seasons without an official general manager, the team hired Mayhew on January 22. He previously served as the GM for the Detroit Lions from 2008 to 2015, and had been working in the San Francisco 49ers' front office since 2017.

== Stadiums ==
=== Stadium changes ===
- Kansas City sold naming rights to its home stadium to health insurer GEHA, renaming the facility to GEHA Field at Arrowhead Stadium. It is the first time in the stadium's 50-year history that it has had a naming rights sponsor.
- Buffalo sold naming rights to its home stadium to Pittsburgh-based health insurer Highmark, resulting in the stadium being renamed Highmark Stadium.
- New Orleans sold naming rights to its home stadium to casino operator Caesars Entertainment, renaming the facility to the Caesars Superdome.
- Carolina changed the playing surface at Bank of America Stadium from natural grass to an artificial FieldTurf surface.

=== COVID-19 restrictions ===
Aided by the availability of vaccines, by June 29 all 32 NFL teams had received approval to play their games with no restrictions on attendance. This came after all games in 2020 were played with either a greatly reduced audience or no fans at all due to public health orders or team discretion based on CDC guidance. In addition, mascots, cheerleaders, and sideline reporters that were not allowed to be on the field in 2020 were allowed to return to the field for 2021. Some teams implemented requirements for proof of vaccination and masking due to public health orders or CDC guidance.

== Uniforms ==
=== Uniform changes ===
- Cincinnati unveiled new uniforms on April 19. The uniforms are similar to their previous set, but have removed some features such as colored shoulder pads, TV numbers, side panels and outlined nameplates for a toned-down appearance. The team's trademark stripes were left as the most prominent feature.
- Cleveland will feature a new white uniform reminiscent of their uniform's 1946 design, commemorating the team's 75th anniversary. Helmet sides are divided with a thin white stripe and have corresponding numbering on either side. Jersey numbers are brown with an orange drop shadow.
- Detroit unveiled new white pants on September 20.
- Green Bay revealed a new throwback on August 19. This throwback design is based on their 1950s all-green look, featuring green jerseys and pants, golden stripes, numbers and nameplates, and blank golden helmets with gray facemasks. Prior to the 2020 season, which featured no alternate uniforms for the team, the team used blue jersey based throwbacks as their third uniform from 2010 to 2019.
- Indianapolis will wear a new throwback uniform on November 28. The design pays homage to the 1956 team, featuring a three-stripe shoulder pattern and helmets with rear logo placement. This design is similar to the one found on the helmet worn with their 2010 alternate uniforms.
- Jacksonville made its alternate teal jerseys its primary uniform. The team had previously used teal jerseys as the primary uniform from 1995 to 2011.
- The Los Angeles Rams revealed a modern throwback variation of their away uniforms on July 13. This design incorporates blue and yellow sleeves, similar to the ones worn on team uniforms from 1978 to 1999.
- The New York Giants will wear new white pants, featuring a stripe pattern resembling their sleeve stripe pattern, with their road uniforms replacing the gray pants. However, the gray pants will be retained for their Week 6 matchup against the Los Angeles Rams to commemorate the 10th anniversary of their Super Bowl XLVI win.
- San Francisco unveiled new red throwback uniforms based on the 1994 Super Bowl team on June 30 in celebration of the franchise's 75th anniversary. The uniforms, which feature white numbers with black drop shadows, are counterpart to the all-white 1994 throwback uniforms used by the team since 2018.

=== Patches ===
- Cleveland and San Francisco unveiled logos to commemorate the 75th anniversary (from the founding of their first league, the All-America Football Conference) for each franchise.

=== 20th anniversary of September 11th attacks ===
- The first week of the season coincided with the 20th anniversary of the September 11 attacks. To commemorate that event, all players wore a stars and stripes ribbon decal bearing the dates "9/11/01" and "9/11/21" on their helmets. Players were also allowed to wear special red, white, and blue gloves and shoes. Furthermore, coaches and league, team, and broadcast personnel were provided ribbon-shaped pins with the same design as the aforementioned decals. In addition, specially designed hats designed by New Era Cap Company bearing New York City Fire Department, New York City Police Department, or Port Authority of New York and New Jersey Police Department insignia were worn by players during the Denver–New York Giants and New York Jets–Carolina games.

== Media ==
=== Broadcast rights ===
==== Television ====
This was the eighth year under the current nine-year broadcast contracts with CBS, Fox, and NBC; and the eighth and final year under the current contract with ESPN/ABC. This included "cross-flexing" (switching) Sunday afternoon games between CBS and Fox before or during the season, regardless of the conference of the visiting team. NBC aired Sunday Night Football, the Kickoff Game, and one Thanksgiving game. ESPN's rights to Monday Night Football were modified this season, allowing ABC to simulcast select games (Weeks 1, 14, and 15), as well as a new Saturday doubleheader in Week 18. Thursday Night Football aired on NFL Network, with Fox and Amazon Prime Video simulcasting 11 games.

NBC televised Super Bowl LVI; CBS was originally scheduled to broadcast the game under the current rotation. However, CBS traded the game to NBC in exchange for Super Bowl LV to avoid counterprogramming by the 2022 Winter Olympics, as this was the first Super Bowl to be scheduled during an ongoing Olympic Games. NBC also holds the U.S. broadcast rights to the Olympics. Due to NBC's coverage of the 2020 Summer Olympics (held 2021), the network sold its broadcast rights to the Pro Football Hall of Fame Game to Fox. NBC maintained Spanish-language rights to Sunday Night Football for Universo via sister division Telemundo Deportes, while its Spanish broadcast network Telemundo would air selected games, including NBC's Wild Card games and Super Bowl LVI.

On March 18, the NFL announced its future television deals for 2023–2033, which will see CBS, Fox, and NBC maintain their existing Sunday packages with expanded digital rights for their streaming services (Paramount+, Tubi, and Peacock, respectively), and ABC added to the Super Bowl rotation. Thursday Night Football will move exclusively to Prime Video, and ESPN also entered into a new agreement for Monday Night Football for 2022, adding the aforementioned Week 18 Saturday doubleheader beginning this season, . Fox and NFL Network opted out of their final season of Thursday Night Football, with Amazon taking over one year early in 2022.

On July 19, ESPN announced a three-year agreement with Peyton and Eli Manning's Omaha Productions to produce Monday Night Football with Peyton and Eli, an alternate broadcast of 10 selected MNF games per-season on ESPN2 featuring informal discussion of the game by the Mannings and appearances by celebrity guests.

For the second consecutive season, Nickelodeon simulcast a wild-card playoff game with CBS using the same youth-friendly broadcast modifications that were in place the previous season. The CBS feed of the game was also streamed on Amazon Prime Video.

On October 13, the league announced that ESPN and ABC signed a five-year deal to simulcast the Monday Night wild-card playoff game, with ESPN2 and ESPN+ providing the "Peyton and Eli" broadcast.

=== Most watched regular season games ===
- DH = doubleheader; SNF = Sunday Night Football; MNF = Monday Night Football; TNF = Thursday Night Football

Rank	Date	Matchup			Network	Viewers (millions)	TV rating	Window	Significance
1	November 25, 4:30 ET	Las Vegas Raiders	36–33	Dallas Cowboys	CBS	37.8	13.1	Thanksgiving	
2	December 25, 4:30 ET	Cleveland Browns	22–24	Green Bay Packers	Fox/NFLN/Amazon	28.6	10.8	Christmas	
3	November 21, 4:25 ET	Dallas Cowboys	9–19	Kansas City Chiefs	Fox	28.1	14.4	Late DH^{[a]}	
4	January 2, 4:25 ET	Arizona Cardinals	25–22	Dallas Cowboys	Fox	26.8	13.8	Late DH^{[b]}	
5	October 3, 8:20 ET	Tampa Bay Buccaneers	19–17	New England Patriots	NBC	26.8	14.6	SNF	Tom Brady's return to New England
6	November 25, 12:30 ET	Chicago Bears	16–14	Detroit Lions	Fox	26.8	10.6	Thanksgiving	Bears–Lions rivalry
7	September 9, 8:20 ET	Dallas Cowboys	29–31	Tampa Bay Buccaneers	NBC	24.8	13.4	Kickoff	NFL Kickoff Game
8	November 28, 4:25 ET	Los Angeles Rams	28–36	Green Bay Packers	Fox	24.7	13.0	Late DH^{[c]}	2020 NFC Divisional Round rematch
9	November 7, 4:25 ET	Green Bay Packers	7–13	Kansas City Chiefs	Fox	24.4	12.6	Late DH^{[d]}	Jordan Love's first start
10	September 19, 4:25 ET	Dallas Cowboys	20–17	Los Angeles Chargers	CBS	24.3	12.6	Late DH^{[e]}	

*Note – Late DH matchups listed in table are the matchups that were shown to the largest percentage of the market.

1. DAL/KC was shown in 93% of the markets during the late doubleheader time slot of Fox coverage.
2. ARZ/DAL was shown in 85% of the markets during the late doubleheader time slot of Fox coverage.
3. LAR/GB was shown in 91% of the markets during the late doubleheader time slot of Fox coverage.
4. GB/KC was shown in 93% of the markets during the late doubleheader time slot of Fox coverage.
5. DAL/LAC was shown in 91% of the markets during the late doubleheader time slot of CBS coverage.
