= List of NFL career passing completions leaders =

This is a list of National Football League quarterbacks career regular season passing completions and attempts, of quarterback playoff completions and attempts by players with over 250 playoff completions. The top 50 are listed below.

Tom Brady is the all-time leader in passing completions with 7,753 and passing attempts with 12,050. He also leads in playoff completions and attempts with 1,200 and 1,921, respectively.

== Regular season completions leaders ==
Bolded players indicate making their debut on list.

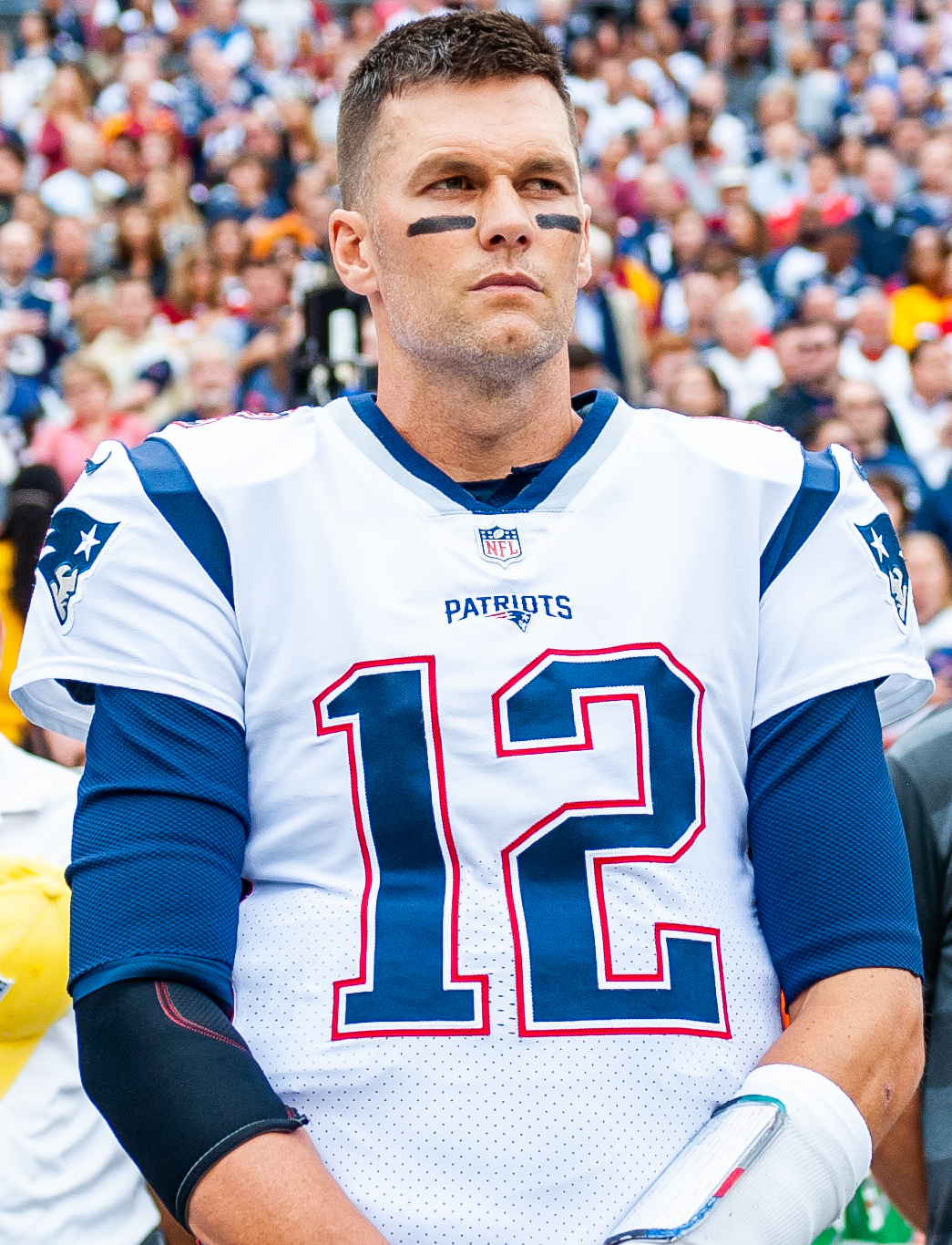
Tom Brady is the all-time leader in passing attempts and completions.

Legend
^	Pro Football Hall of Famer
*	Active

Through Week 11 earlier Sunday games of 2026 season.

Rank	Player	Team(s) by season	Completions	Attempts	Pct.
1	Tom Brady	New England Patriots (2000–2019); Tampa Bay Buccaneers (2020–2022)	7,753	12,050	64.3%
2	Drew Brees^{^}	San Diego Chargers (2001–2005); New Orleans Saints (2006–2020)	7,142	10,551	67.7%
3	Brett Favre^{^}	Atlanta Falcons (1991); Green Bay Packers (1992–2007); New York Jets (2008); Minnesota Vikings (2009–2010)	6,300	10,169	62%
4	Peyton Manning^{^}	Indianapolis Colts (1998–2011); Denver Broncos (2012–2015)	6,125	9,380	65.3%
5	Aaron Rodgers^{*}	Green Bay Packers (2005–2022); New York Jets (2023–2024); Pittsburgh Steelers (2025–present)	5,916	9,104	65%
6	Matthew Stafford^{*}	Detroit Lions (2009–2020); Los Angeles Rams (2021–present)	5,836	9,178	63.6%
7	Matt Ryan	Atlanta Falcons (2008–2021); Indianapolis Colts (2022)	5,551	8,464	65.6%
8	Ben Roethlisberger	Pittsburgh Steelers (2004–2021)	5,440	8,443	64.4%
9	Philip Rivers	San Diego/L.A. Chargers (2004–2019); Indianapolis Colts (2020, 2025)	5,335	8,226	64.9%
10	Dan Marino^{^}	Miami Dolphins (1983–1998)	4,967	8,358	59.4%
11	Eli Manning	New York Giants (2004–2019)	4,895	8,119	60.3%
12	Joe Flacco^{*}	Baltimore Ravens (2008–2018); Denver Broncos (2019); New York Jets (2020, 2021–2022); Philadelphia Eagles (2021); Cleveland Browns (2023, 2025); Indianapolis Colts (2024); Cincinnati Bengals (2025–present)	4,417	7,167	61.6%
13	Kirk Cousins^{*}	Washington Redskins (2012–2017); Minnesota Vikings (2018–2023, 2026–present); Atlanta Falcons (2024–2025); Las Vegas Raiders (2026)	4,157	6,245	66.6%
14	John Elway^{^}	Denver Broncos (1983–1998)	4,123	7,250	56.9%
15	Warren Moon^{^}	Houston Oilers (1984–1993); Minnesota Vikings (1994–1996); Seattle Seahawks (1997–1998); Kansas City Chiefs (1999–2000)	3,988	6,823	58.4%
16	Russell Wilson	Seattle Seahawks (2012–2021); Denver Broncos (2022–2023); Pittsburgh Steelers (2024); New York Giants (2025)	3,951	6,120	64.6%
17	Carson Palmer	Cincinnati Bengals (2003–2010); Oakland Raiders (2011–2012); Arizona Cardinals (2013–2017)	3,941	6,307	62.5%
18	Drew Bledsoe	New England Patriots (1993–2001); Buffalo Bills (2002–2004); Dallas Cowboys (2005–2006)	3,839	6,717	57.2%
19	Vinny Testaverde	Tampa Bay Buccaneers (1987–1992); Cleveland Browns (1993–1995); Baltimore Ravens (1996–1997); New York Jets (1998–2003, 2005); Dallas Cowboys (2004); New England Patriots (2006); Carolina Panthers (2007)	3,787	6,701	56.5%
20	Derek Carr	Oakland/Las Vegas Raiders (2014–2022); New Orleans Saints (2023–2024)	3,765	5,685	65.1%
21	Fran Tarkenton^{^}	Minnesota Vikings (1961–1966, 1972–1978); New York Giants (1967–1971)	3,686	6,467	57%
22	Jared Goff^{*}	Los Angeles Rams (2016–2020); Detroit Lions (2021–present)	3,665	5,556	66%
23	Andy Dalton^{*}	Cincinnati Bengals (2011–2019); Dallas Cowboys (2020); Chicago Bears (2021); New Orleans Saints (2022); Carolina Panthers (2023–2025); Philadelphia Eagles (2026); Atlanta Falcons (2026–present)	3,539	5,652	62.6%
24	Kerry Collins	Carolina Panthers (1995–1998) (Note: Collins was traded during the 1998 season; he played four games for the Panthers and seven for the Saints.); New Orleans Saints (1998); New York Giants (1999–2003); Oakland Raiders (2004–2005); Tennessee Titans (2006–2010); Indianapolis Colts (2011)	3,487	6,261	55.7%
25	Dak Prescott^{*}	Dallas Cowboys (2016–present)	3,432	5,146	66.7%
26	Joe Montana^{^}	San Francisco 49ers (1979–1992); Kansas City Chiefs (1993–1994)	3,409	5,391	63.2%
27	Dan Fouts^{^}	San Diego Chargers (1973–1987)	3,297	5,604	58.8%
28	Patrick Mahomes^{*}	Kansas City Chiefs (2017–present)	3,292	4,971	66.2%
29	Alex Smith	San Francisco 49ers (2005–2012); Kansas City Chiefs (2013–2017); Washington Football Team (2018–2020)	3,250	5,193	62.6%
30	Matt Hasselbeck	Green Bay Packers (1999–2000); Seattle Seahawks (2001–2010); Tennessee Titans (2011–2012); Indianapolis Colts (2013–2015)	3,222	5,330	60.5%
31	Donovan McNabb	Philadelphia Eagles (1999–2009); Washington Redskins (2010); Minnesota Vikings (2011)	3,170	5,374	59%
32	Dave Krieg	Seattle Seahawks (1980–1991); Kansas City Chiefs (1992–1993); Detroit Lions (1994); Arizona Cardinals (1995); Chicago Bears (1996); Tennessee Oilers (1997–1998)	3,105	5,311	58.5%
33	Ryan Fitzpatrick	St. Louis Rams (2005–2006); Cincinnati Bengals (2007–2008); Buffalo Bills (2009–2012); Tennessee Titans (2013); Houston Texans (2014); New York Jets (2015–2016); Tampa Bay Buccaneers (2017–2018); Miami Dolphins (2019–2020); Washington Football Team (2021)	3,072	5,060	60.7%
34	Ryan Tannehill	Miami Dolphins (2012–2018); Tennessee Titans (2019–2023)	3,064	4,764	64.3%
35	Jay Cutler	Denver Broncos (2006–2008); Chicago Bears (2009–2016); Miami Dolphins (2017)	3,048	4,920	62%
36	Boomer Esiason	Cincinnati Bengals (1984–1992, 1997); New York Jets (1993–1995); Arizona Cardinals (1996)	2,969	5,205	57%
37	Troy Aikman^{^}	Dallas Cowboys (1989–2000)	2,898	4,715	61.5%
38	Steve DeBerg	San Francisco 49ers (1978–1980); Denver Broncos (1981–1983); Tampa Bay Buccaneers (1984–1987, 1992–1993) (Note: DeBerg was cut during the 1993 season; he played three games for the Buccaneers and five for the Dolphins.); Kansas City Chiefs (1988–1991); Miami Dolphins (1993); Atlanta Falcons (1998)	2,874	5,024	57.2%
38	Jim Kelly^{^}	Buffalo Bills (1986–1996)	2,874	4,779	60.1%
40	Jim Everett	Los Angeles Rams (1986–1993); New Orleans Saints (1994–1996); San Diego Chargers (1997)	2,841	4,923	57.7%
41	Johnny Unitas^{^}	Baltimore Colts (1956–1972); San Diego Chargers (1973)	2,830	5,186	54.6%
42	Tony Romo	Dallas Cowboys (2003–2016)	2,829	4,335	65.3%
43	Josh Allen^{*}	Buffalo Bills (2018–present)	2,782	4,345	64%
44	Mark Brunell	Green Bay Packers (1994); Jacksonville Jaguars (1995–2003); Washington Redskins (2004–2007); New Orleans Saints (2010–2011)	2,754	4,625	59.5%
45	Steve McNair	Houston/Tennessee Oilers/Titans (1995–2005); Baltimore Ravens (2006–2007)	2,733	4,544	60.1%
46	Cam Newton	Carolina Panthers (2011–2019, 2021); New England Patriots (2020)	2,682	4,474	59.9%
47	Jon Kitna	Seattle Seahawks (1997–2000); Cincinnati Bengals (2001–2005); Detroit Lions (2006–2008); Dallas Cowboys (2009–2011, 2013)	2,677	4,442	60.3%
48	Brad Johnson	Minnesota Vikings (1994–1998), (2005–2006); Washington Redskins (1999–2000); Tampa Bay Buccaneers (2001–2004)	2,668	4,324	61.7%
49	Steve Young^{^}	Tampa Bay Buccaneers (1985–1986); San Francisco 49ers (1987–1999)	2,667	4,149	64.3%
50	Kurt Warner^{^}	St. Louis Rams (1998–2003); New York Giants (2004); Arizona Cardinals (2005–2009)	2,666	4,070	65.5%
Rank	Player	Team(s) by season	Completions	Attempts	Pct.

== Playoff leaders ==
Through 2025–26 NFL playoffs. Based on at least 250 completions.

Rank	Player	Team(s) by season	Completions	Attempts	Pct.
1	Tom Brady	New England Patriots (2000–2019); Tampa Bay Buccaneers (2020–2022)	1,200	1,921	62.5%
2	Peyton Manning^{^}	Indianapolis Colts (1998–2011); Denver Broncos (2012–2015)	649	1,027	63.2%
3	Aaron Rodgers^{*}	Green Bay Packers (2005–2022); New York Jets (2023–2024); Pittsburgh Steelers (2025–present)	518	807	64.2%
4	Patrick Mahomes^{*}	Kansas City Chiefs (2017–present)	511	755	67.7%
5	Ben Roethlisberger	Pittsburgh Steelers (2004–2021)	498	788	63.2%
6	Drew Brees^{^}	San Diego Chargers (2001–2005); New Orleans Saints (2006–2020)	481	721	66.7%
6	Brett Favre^{^}	Atlanta Falcons (1991); Green Bay Packers (1992–2007); New York Jets (2008); Minnesota Vikings (2009–2010)	481	791	60.8%
8	Joe Montana^{^}	San Francisco 49ers (1979–1992); Kansas City Chiefs (1993–1994)	460	734	62.7%
9	Dan Marino^{^}	Miami Dolphins (1983–1999)	385	687	56%
10	Josh Allen^{*}	Buffalo Bills (2018–present)	355	534	66.5%
10	John Elway^{^}	Denver Broncos (1983–1998)	355	651	54.5%
12	Donovan McNabb	Philadelphia Eagles (1999–2009); Washington Redskins (2010); Minnesota Vikings (2011)	341	577	59.1%
13	Jim Kelly^{^}	Buffalo Bills (1986–1996)	322	545	59.1%
14	Troy Aikman^{^}	Dallas Cowboys (1989–2000)	320	502	63.7%
15	Matthew Stafford^{*}	Detroit Lions (2009–2020); Los Angeles Rams (2021–present)	308	483	63.8%
16	Kurt Warner^{^}	St. Louis Rams (1998–2003); New York Giants (2004); Arizona Cardinals (2005–2009)	307	462	66.5%
17	Russell Wilson	Seattle Seahawks (2012–2021); Denver Broncos (2022–2023); Pittsburgh Steelers (2024); New York Giants (2025)	295	478	61.7%
18	Steve Young^{^}	Tampa Bay Buccaneers (1985–1986); San Francisco 49ers (1987–1999)	292	471	62%
19	Joe Flacco^{*}	Baltimore Ravens (2008–2018); Denver Broncos (2019); New York Jets (2020, 2021–2022); Philadelphia Eagles (2021); Cleveland Browns (2023, 2025); Indianapolis Colts (2024); Cincinnati Bengals (2025–present)	287	493	58.2%
20	Terry Bradshaw^{^}	Pittsburgh Steelers (1970–1983)	261	456	57.2%
21	Warren Moon^{^}	Houston Oilers (1984–1993); Minnesota Vikings (1994–1996); Seattle Seahawks (1997–1998); Kansas City Chiefs (1999–2000)	259	403	64.3%

== Historical passing completions leaders ==
Nine players are recognised as having held the record as the NFL's career pass completions leader. The longest record holder was Fran Tarkenton who held the record for 20 years.

"Slinging Sammy" Baugh, the Texas Christian U. star was rated as one of the greatest of his generation.

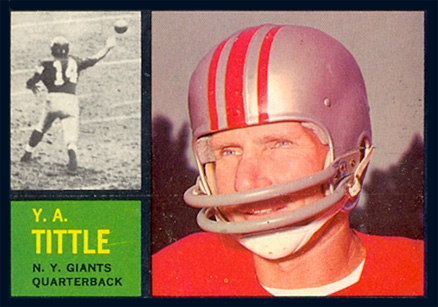
Y A Tittle retired as the NFL's all-time leader in passing yards, passing touchdowns, completions, and games played

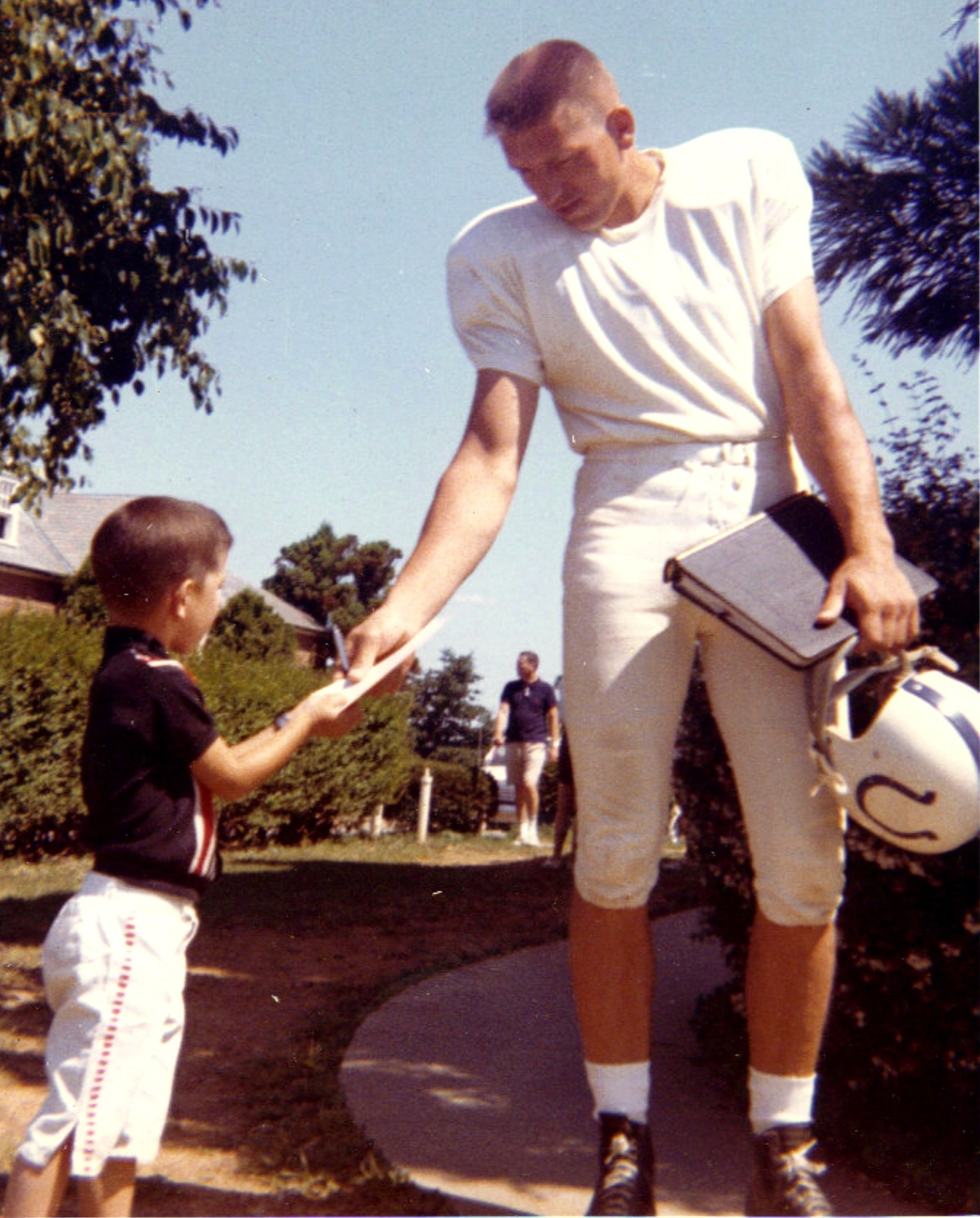
Johnny Unitas won an NFL title in the 1950s and a Super Bowl in the 1970s.

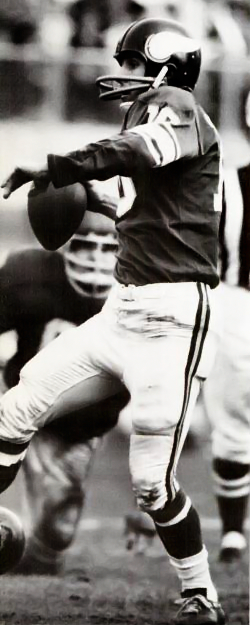
Fran Tarkenton about to throw a forward pass (1965)

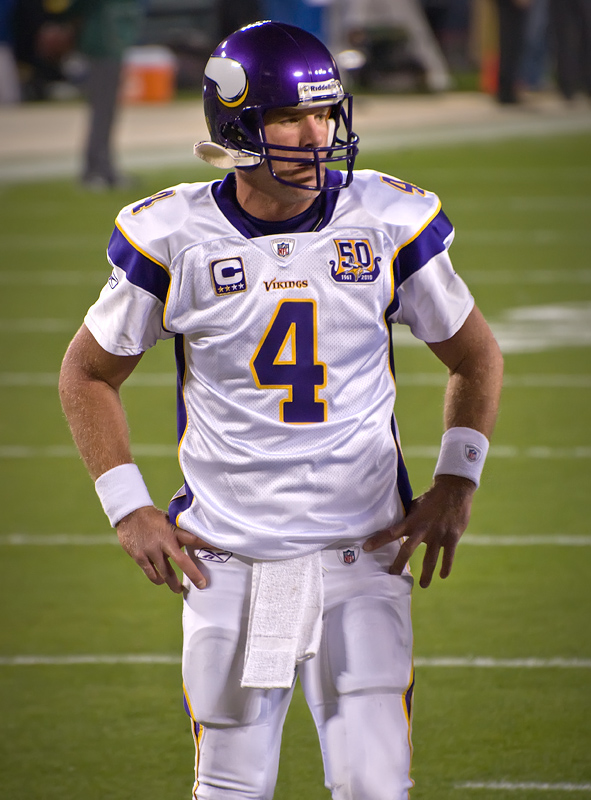
Brett Favre had held the record from 2006 to 2018, when it was broken by Drew Brees. He had also held the record for career pass attempts from 2008 to 2020.

Reign	Player	Team(s) while leader	Career completions	Season
1932–1940 (9 years)	Arnie Herber^{^}	Green Bay Packers	37	1932
1932–1940 (9 years)	Arnie Herber^{^}	Green Bay Packers	87	1933
1932–1940 (9 years)	Arnie Herber^{^}	Green Bay Packers	129	1934
1932–1940 (9 years)	Arnie Herber^{^}	Green Bay Packers	169	1935
1932–1940 (9 years)	Arnie Herber^{^}	Green Bay Packers	246	1936
1932–1940 (9 years)	Arnie Herber^{^}	Green Bay Packers	293	1937
1932–1940 (9 years)	Arnie Herber^{^}	Green Bay Packers	315	1938
1932–1940 (9 years)	Arnie Herber^{^}	Green Bay Packers	372	1939
1932–1940 (9 years)	Arnie Herber^{^}	Green Bay Packers	410	1940
1941–1959 (19 years)	Sammy Baugh^{^}	Washington Redskins	414	1941
1941–1959 (19 years)	Sammy Baugh^{^}	Washington Redskins	546	1942
1941–1959 (19 years)	Sammy Baugh^{^}	Washington Redskins	670	1943
1941–1959 (19 years)	Sammy Baugh^{^}	Washington Redskins	761	1944
1941–1959 (19 years)	Sammy Baugh^{^}	Washington Redskins	889	1945
1941–1959 (19 years)	Sammy Baugh^{^}	Washington Redskins	976	1946
1941–1959 (19 years)	Sammy Baugh^{^}	Washington Redskins	1,186	1947
1941–1959 (19 years)	Sammy Baugh^{^}	Washington Redskins	1,371	1948
1941–1959 (19 years)	Sammy Baugh^{^}	Washington Redskins	1,516	1949
1941–1959 (19 years)	Sammy Baugh^{^}	Washington Redskins	1,606	1950
1941–1959 (19 years)	Sammy Baugh^{^}	Washington Redskins	1,673	1951
1941–1959 (19 years)	Sammy Baugh^{^}	Washington Redskins	1,693	1952–1959
1960–1968 (9 years)	Y. A. Tittle^{^}	San Francisco 49ers (1960); New York Giants (1961–1964)	1,696	1960
1960–1968 (9 years)	Y. A. Tittle^{^}	San Francisco 49ers (1960); New York Giants (1961–1964)	1,859	1961
1960–1968 (9 years)	Y. A. Tittle^{^}	San Francisco 49ers (1960); New York Giants (1961–1964)	2,059	1962
1960–1968 (9 years)	Y. A. Tittle^{^}	San Francisco 49ers (1960); New York Giants (1961–1964)	2,280	1963
1960–1968 (9 years)	Y. A. Tittle^{^}	San Francisco 49ers (1960); New York Giants (1961–1964)	2,427	1964–1968
1969–1974 (6 years)	Johnny Unitas^{^}	Baltimore Colts (1969–1972); San Diego Chargers (1973)	2,450	1969
1969–1974 (6 years)	Johnny Unitas^{^}	Baltimore Colts (1969–1972); San Diego Chargers (1973)	2,616	1970
1969–1974 (6 years)	Johnny Unitas^{^}	Baltimore Colts (1969–1972); San Diego Chargers (1973)	2,708	1971
1969–1974 (6 years)	Johnny Unitas^{^}	Baltimore Colts (1969–1972); San Diego Chargers (1973)	2,796	1972
1969–1974 (6 years)	Johnny Unitas^{^}	Baltimore Colts (1969–1972); San Diego Chargers (1973)	2,830	1973–1974
1975–1994 (20 years)	Fran Tarkenton^{^}	Minnesota Vikings	2,931	1975
1975–1994 (20 years)	Fran Tarkenton^{^}	Minnesota Vikings	3,186	1976
1975–1994 (20 years)	Fran Tarkenton^{^}	Minnesota Vikings	3,341	1977
1975–1994 (20 years)	Fran Tarkenton^{^}	Minnesota Vikings	3,686	1978–1994
1995–2005 (11 years)	Dan Marino^{^}	Miami Dolphins	3,913	1995
1995–2005 (11 years)	Dan Marino^{^}	Miami Dolphins	4,134	1996
1995–2005 (11 years)	Dan Marino^{^}	Miami Dolphins	4,453	1997
1995–2005 (11 years)	Dan Marino^{^}	Miami Dolphins	4,763	1998
1995–2005 (11 years)	Dan Marino^{^}	Miami Dolphins	4,967	1999–2005
2006–2017 (12 years)	Brett Favre^{^}	Green Bay Packers (2006–2007); New York Jets (2008); Minnesota Vikings (2009–2010)	5,021	2006
2006–2017 (12 years)	Brett Favre^{^}	Green Bay Packers (2006–2007); New York Jets (2008); Minnesota Vikings (2009–2010)	5,377	2007
2006–2017 (12 years)	Brett Favre^{^}	Green Bay Packers (2006–2007); New York Jets (2008); Minnesota Vikings (2009–2010)	5,720	2008
2006–2017 (12 years)	Brett Favre^{^}	Green Bay Packers (2006–2007); New York Jets (2008); Minnesota Vikings (2009–2010)	6,083	2009
2006–2017 (12 years)	Brett Favre^{^}	Green Bay Packers (2006–2007); New York Jets (2008); Minnesota Vikings (2009–2010)	6,300	2010–2017
2018–2020 (3 years)	Drew Brees^{^}	New Orleans Saints	6,586	2018
2018–2020 (3 years)	Drew Brees^{^}	New Orleans Saints	6,867	2019
2018–2020 (3 years)	Drew Brees^{^}	New Orleans Saints	7,142	2020
Since 2021 (6 years)	Tom Brady	Tampa Bay Buccaneers	7,263	2021
Since 2021 (6 years)	Tom Brady	Tampa Bay Buccaneers	7,753	2022–2026

== See also ==
- List of gridiron football quarterbacks passing statistics
- List of National Football League career passing touchdowns leaders
- List of National Football League career passing yards leaders
- List of National Football League career quarterback wins leaders
- List of National Football League records (individual)
