= List of NFL career passing yards leaders =

This list shows the top National Football League quarterbacks with the top 50 players with the most career regular season passing yards, the NFL playoff passing yards leaders with at least 2,500 yards, and the historical progression of regular season record holders. Quarterback totals from the American Football League (1960–1969) and All-American Football Conference (1946–1949) are also recognized by the NFL and are included.

Tom Brady holds both the regular season record, with 89,214 passing yards, and the playoff record, with 13,400 yards.

In American football, passing, along with running (also referred to as rushing), is one of the two main methods of advancing the ball down the field. Passes are typically attempted by the quarterback, but any offensive player can attempt a pass provided they are behind the line of scrimmage. To qualify as a passing play, the ball must have initially moved forward after leaving the hands of the passer; if the ball initially moved laterally or backwards, the play would instead be considered a running play. The amount of passing yards recorded by each quarterback is a recorded stat in football games.

== Regular season career passing yards leaders ==
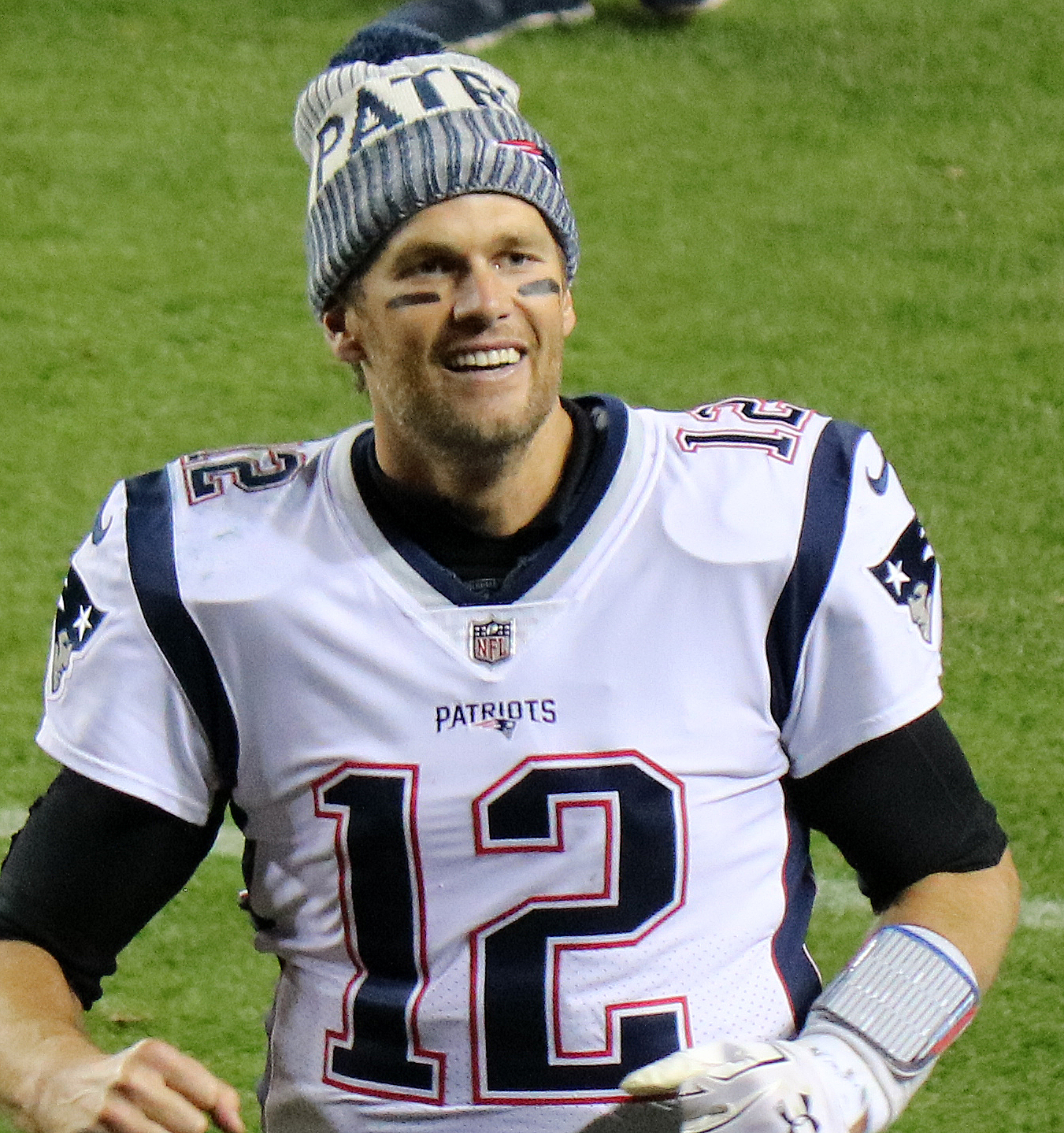
Tom Brady is the career passing yards leader with 89,214 yards and career playoff passing yards leader with 13,400.

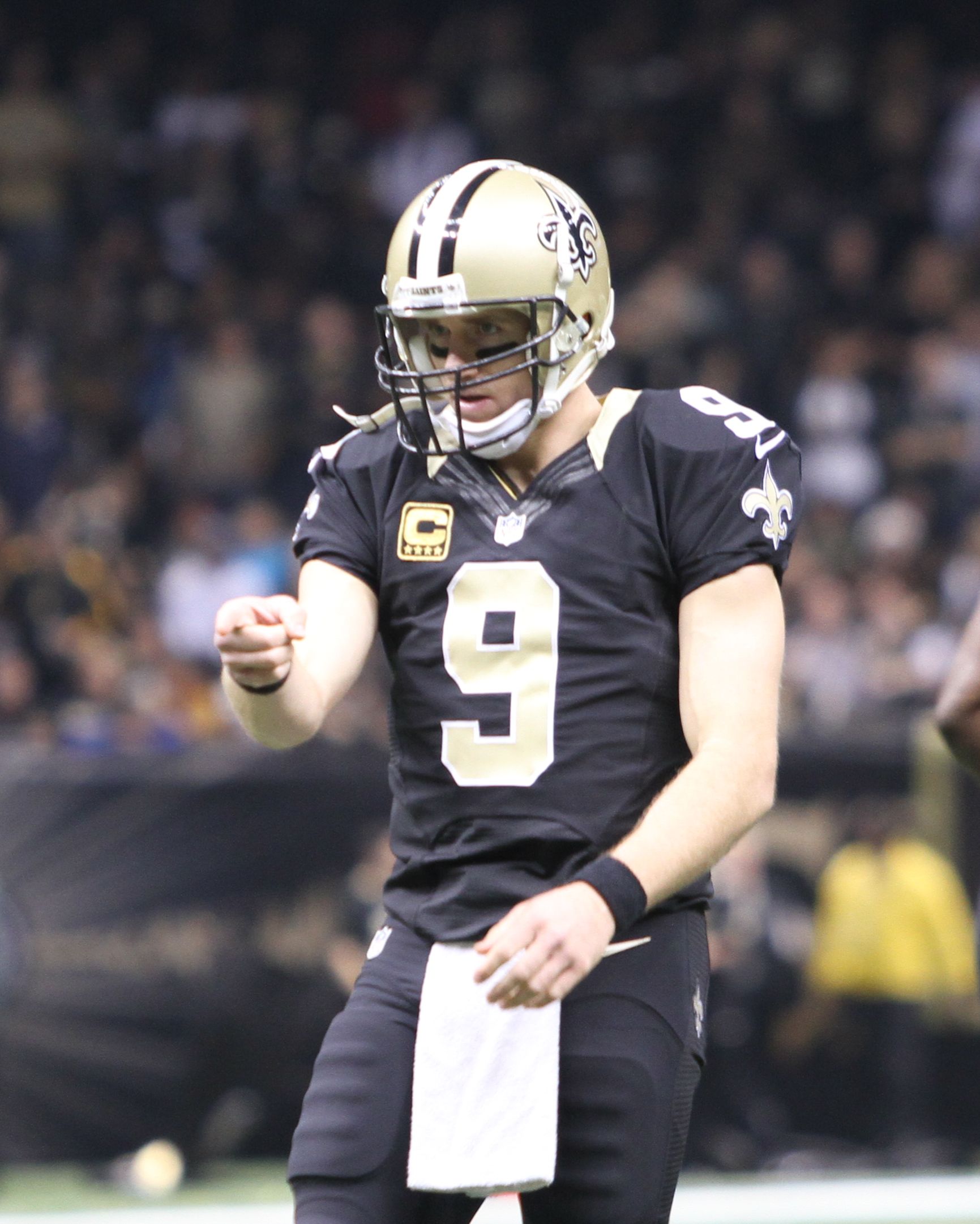
Drew Brees is second all-time in passing yards with 80,358.

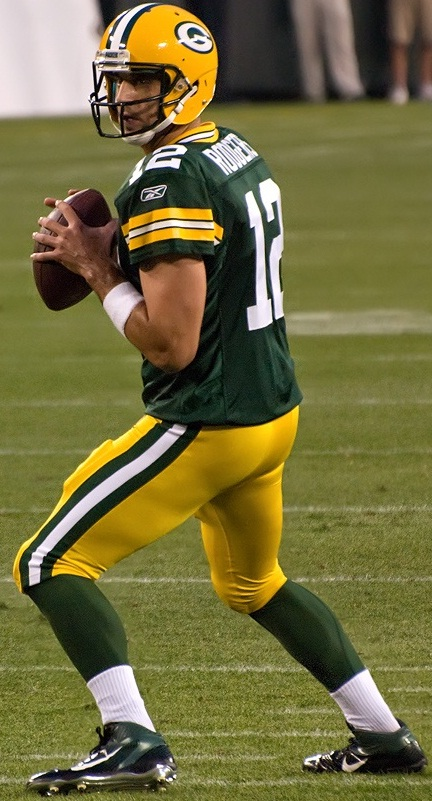
Aaron Rodgers, with over 68,000 passing yards, is the active leader in career yardage.

Legend
| Symbol | Meaning |
|---|---|
| Yds | Career passing yardage |
| GP | Games played |
| YPG | Average yardage per game |
| † | Pro Football Hall of Famer |
| ^ | Active |

Through Week 11 earlier Sunday games of 2026 season.

NFL regular season career passing yards leaders
| Rank | Player | Yds | GP | YPG | Team(s) | Seasons | Refs |
|---|---|---|---|---|---|---|---|
| 1 | Tom Brady | 89,214 | 335 | 266.3 | New England Patriots | 2000–2019 | |
| 1 | Tom Brady | 89,214 | 335 | 266.3 | Tampa Bay Buccaneers | 2020–2022 | |
| 2 | Drew Brees† | 80,358 | 287 | 280 | San Diego Chargers | 2001–2005 | |
| 2 | Drew Brees† | 80,358 | 287 | 280 | New Orleans Saints | 2006–2020 | |
| 3 | Peyton Manning† | 71,940 | 266 | 270.5 | Indianapolis Colts | 1998–2011 | |
| 3 | Peyton Manning† | 71,940 | 266 | 270.5 | Denver Broncos | 2012–2015 | |
| 4 | Brett Favre† | 71,838 | 302 | 237.9 | Atlanta Falcons | 1991 | |
| 4 | Brett Favre† | 71,838 | 302 | 237.9 | Green Bay Packers | 1992–2007 | |
| 4 | Brett Favre† | 71,838 | 302 | 237.9 | New York Jets | 2008 | |
| 4 | Brett Favre† | 71,838 | 302 | 237.9 | Minnesota Vikings | 2009–2010 | |
| 5 | Aaron Rodgers^ | 68,515 | 274 | 250.1 | Green Bay Packers | 2005–2022 | |
| 5 | Aaron Rodgers^ | 68,515 | 274 | 250.1 | New York Jets | 2023–2024 | |
| 5 | Aaron Rodgers^ | 68,515 | 274 | 250.1 | Pittsburgh Steelers | 2025–present | |
| 6 | Matthew Stafford^ | 67,139 | 249 | 269.6 | Detroit Lions | 2009–2020 | |
| 6 | Matthew Stafford^ | 67,139 | 249 | 269.6 | Los Angeles Rams | 2021–present | |
| 7 | Ben Roethlisberger | 64,088 | 249 | 257.4 | Pittsburgh Steelers | 2004–2021 | |
| 8 | Philip Rivers | 63,984 | 247 | 259 | San Diego/L.A. Chargers | 2004–2019 | |
| 8 | Philip Rivers | 63,984 | 247 | 259 | Indianapolis Colts | 2020, 2025 | |
| 9 | Matt Ryan | 62,792 | 234 | 268.3 | Atlanta Falcons | 2008–2021 | |
| 9 | Matt Ryan | 62,792 | 234 | 268.3 | Indianapolis Colts | 2022 | |
| 10 | Dan Marino† | 61,361 | 243 | 253.6 | Miami Dolphins | 1983–1999 | |
| 11 | Eli Manning | 57,023 | 236 | 241.6 | New York Giants | 2004–2019 | |
| 12 | John Elway† | 51,475 | 234 | 220 | Denver Broncos | 1983–1998 | |
| 13 | Warren Moon† | 49,325 | 208 | 237.1 | Houston Oilers | 1984–1993 | |
| 13 | Warren Moon† | 49,325 | 208 | 237.1 | Minnesota Vikings | 1994–1996 | |
| 13 | Warren Moon† | 49,325 | 208 | 237.1 | Seattle Seahawks | 1997–1998 | |
| 13 | Warren Moon† | 49,325 | 208 | 237.1 | Kansas City Chiefs | 1999–2000 | |
| 14 | Joe Flacco^ | 48,176 | 209 | 230.5 | Baltimore Ravens | 2008–2018 | |
| 14 | Joe Flacco^ | 48,176 | 209 | 230.5 | Denver Broncos | 2019–2020 | |
| 14 | Joe Flacco^ | 48,176 | 209 | 230.5 | New York Jets | 2020, 2021–2022 | |
| 14 | Joe Flacco^ | 48,176 | 209 | 230.5 | Philadelphia Eagles | 2021 | |
| 14 | Joe Flacco^ | 48,176 | 209 | 230.5 | Cleveland Browns | 2023, 2025 | |
| 14 | Joe Flacco^ | 48,176 | 209 | 230.5 | Indianapolis Colts | 2024 | |
| 14 | Joe Flacco^ | 48,176 | 209 | 230.5 | Cincinnati Bengals | 2025–present | |
| 15 | Kirk Cousins^{^} | 47,247 | 184 | 256.8 | Washington Redskins | 2012–2017 | |
| 15 | Kirk Cousins^{^} | 47,247 | 184 | 256.8 | Minnesota Vikings | 2018–2023, 2026–present | |
| 15 | Kirk Cousins^{^} | 47,247 | 184 | 256.8 | Atlanta Falcons | 2024–2025 | |
| 15 | Kirk Cousins^{^} | 47,247 | 184 | 256.8 | Las Vegas Raiders | 2026 | |
| 16 | Fran Tarkenton† | 47,003 | 246 | 191.1 | Minnesota Vikings | 1961–1966, 1972–1978 | |
| 16 | Fran Tarkenton† | 47,003 | 246 | 191.1 | New York Giants | 1967–1971 | |
| 17 | Russell Wilson | 46,966 | 205 | 229.1 | Seattle Seahawks | 2012–2021 | |
| 17 | Russell Wilson | 46,966 | 205 | 229.1 | Denver Broncos | 2022–2023 | |
| 17 | Russell Wilson | 46,966 | 205 | 229.1 | Pittsburgh Steelers | 2024 | |
| 17 | Russell Wilson | 46,966 | 205 | 229.1 | New York Giants | 2025 | |
| 18 | Carson Palmer | 46,247 | 182 | 254.1 | Cincinnati Bengals | 2003–2010 | |
| 18 | Carson Palmer | 46,247 | 182 | 254.1 | Oakland Raiders | 2011–2012 | |
| 18 | Carson Palmer | 46,247 | 182 | 254.1 | Arizona Cardinals | 2013–2017 | |
| 19 | Vinny Testaverde | 46,233 | 233 | 198.4 | Tampa Bay Buccaneers | 1987–1992 | |
| 19 | Vinny Testaverde | 46,233 | 233 | 198.4 | Cleveland Browns | 1993–1995 | |
| 19 | Vinny Testaverde | 46,233 | 233 | 198.4 | Baltimore Ravens | 1996–1997 | |
| 19 | Vinny Testaverde | 46,233 | 233 | 198.4 | New York Jets | 1998–2003, 2005 | |
| 19 | Vinny Testaverde | 46,233 | 233 | 198.4 | Dallas Cowboys | 2004 | |
| 19 | Vinny Testaverde | 46,233 | 233 | 198.4 | New England Patriots | 2006 | |
| 19 | Vinny Testaverde | 46,233 | 233 | 198.4 | Carolina Panthers | 2007 | |
| 20 | Drew Bledsoe | 44,611 | 194 | 230 | New England Patriots | 1993–2001 | |
| 20 | Drew Bledsoe | 44,611 | 194 | 230 | Buffalo Bills | 2002–2004 | |
| 20 | Drew Bledsoe | 44,611 | 194 | 230 | Dallas Cowboys | 2005–2006 | |
| 21 | Dan Fouts† | 43,040 | 181 | 237.8 | San Diego Chargers | 1973–1987 | |
| 22 | Jared Goff^ | 42,059 | 160 | 262.9 | Los Angeles Rams | 2016–2020 | |
| 22 | Jared Goff^ | 42,059 | 160 | 262.9 | Detroit Lions | 2021–present | |
| 23 | Derek Carr | 41,245 | 169 | 244.1 | Oakland/Las Vegas Raiders | 2014–2022 | |
| 23 | Derek Carr | 41,245 | 169 | 244.1 | New Orleans Saints | 2023–2024 | |
| 24 | Kerry Collins | 40,922 | 198 | 206.7 | Carolina Panthers | 1995–1998 (Note: Collins was traded during the 1998 season; he played four games for the Panthers and seven for the Saints.) | |
| 24 | Kerry Collins | 40,922 | 198 | 206.7 | New Orleans Saints | 1998 | |
| 24 | Kerry Collins | 40,922 | 198 | 206.7 | New York Giants | 1999–2003 | |
| 24 | Kerry Collins | 40,922 | 198 | 206.7 | Oakland Raiders | 2004–2005 | |
| 24 | Kerry Collins | 40,922 | 198 | 206.7 | Tennessee Titans | 2006–2010 | |
| 24 | Kerry Collins | 40,922 | 198 | 206.7 | Indianapolis Colts | 2011 | |
| 25 | Joe Montana† | 40,551 | 192 | 211.2 | San Francisco 49ers | 1979–1992 | |
| 25 | Joe Montana† | 40,551 | 192 | 211.2 | Kansas City Chiefs | 1993–1994 | |
| 26 | Johnny Unitas† | 40,239 | 211 | 190.7 | Baltimore Colts | 1956–1972 | |
| 26 | Johnny Unitas† | 40,239 | 211 | 190.7 | San Diego Chargers | 1973 | |
| 27 | Andy Dalton^ | 39,793 | 179 | 222.3 | Cincinnati Bengals | 2011–2019 | |
| 27 | Andy Dalton^ | 39,793 | 179 | 222.3 | Dallas Cowboys | 2020 | |
| 27 | Andy Dalton^ | 39,793 | 179 | 222.3 | Chicago Bears | 2021 | |
| 27 | Andy Dalton^ | 39,793 | 179 | 222.3 | New Orleans Saints | 2022 | |
| 27 | Andy Dalton^ | 39,793 | 179 | 222.3 | Carolina Panthers | 2023–2025 | |
| 27 | Andy Dalton^ | 39,793 | 179 | 222.3 | Philadelphia Eagles | 2026 | |
| 27 | Andy Dalton^ | 39,793 | 179 | 222.3 | Atlanta Falcons | 2026–present | |
| 28 | Dak Prescott^ | 38,713 | 159 | 243.5 | Dallas Cowboys | 2016–present | |
| 29 | Patrick Mahomes^ | 38,324 | 135 | 283.9 | Kansas City Chiefs | 2017–present | |
| 30 | Dave Krieg | 38,147 | 213 | 179.1 | Seattle Seahawks | 1980–1991 | |
| 30 | Dave Krieg | 38,147 | 213 | 179.1 | Kansas City Chiefs | 1992–1993 | |
| 30 | Dave Krieg | 38,147 | 213 | 179.1 | Detroit Lions | 1994 | |
| 30 | Dave Krieg | 38,147 | 213 | 179.1 | Arizona Cardinals | 1995 | |
| 30 | Dave Krieg | 38,147 | 213 | 179.1 | Chicago Bears | 1996 | |
| 30 | Dave Krieg | 38,147 | 213 | 179.1 | Tennessee Oilers | 1997–1998 | |
| 31 | Boomer Esiason | 37,920 | 187 | 202.8 | Cincinnati Bengals | 1984–1992, 1997 | |
| 31 | Boomer Esiason | 37,920 | 187 | 202.8 | New York Jets | 1993–1995 | |
| 31 | Boomer Esiason | 37,920 | 187 | 202.8 | Arizona Cardinals | 1996 | |
| 32 | Donovan McNabb | 37,276 | 167 | 223.2| | Philadelphia Eagles | 1999–2009 | |
| 32 | Donovan McNabb | 37,276 | 167 | 223.2| | Washington Redskins | 2010 | |
| 32 | Donovan McNabb | 37,276 | 167 | 223.2| | Minnesota Vikings | 2011 | |
| 33 | Matt Hasselbeck | 36,638 | 209 | 175.3 | Green Bay Packers | 1999–2000 | |
| 33 | Matt Hasselbeck | 36,638 | 209 | 175.3 | Seattle Seahawks | 2001–2010 | |
| 33 | Matt Hasselbeck | 36,638 | 209 | 175.3 | Tennessee Titans | 2011–2012 | |
| 33 | Matt Hasselbeck | 36,638 | 209 | 175.3 | Indianapolis Colts | 2013–2015 | |
| 34 | Alex Smith | 35,650 | 174 | 204.9 | San Francisco 49ers | 2005–2012 | |
| 34 | Alex Smith | 35,650 | 174 | 204.9 | Kansas City Chiefs | 2013–2017 | |
| 34 | Alex Smith | 35,650 | 174 | 204.9 | Washington Redskins/Football Team | 2018–2019 | |
| 35 | Jim Kelly† | 35,467 | 160 | 221.7 | Buffalo Bills | 1986–1996 | |
| 36 | Jay Cutler | 35,133 | 153 | 229.6 | Denver Broncos | 2006–2008 | |
| 36 | Jay Cutler | 35,133 | 153 | 229.6 | Chicago Bears | 2009–2016 | |
| 36 | Jay Cutler | 35,133 | 153 | 229.6 | Miami Dolphins | 2017 | |
| 37 | Ryan Fitzpatrick | 34,990 | 166 | 210.8 | St. Louis Rams | 2005–2006 | |
| 37 | Ryan Fitzpatrick | 34,990 | 166 | 210.8 | Cincinnati Bengals | 2007–2008 | |
| 37 | Ryan Fitzpatrick | 34,990 | 166 | 210.8 | Buffalo Bills | 2009–2012 | |
| 37 | Ryan Fitzpatrick | 34,990 | 166 | 210.8 | Tennessee Titans | 2013 | |
| 37 | Ryan Fitzpatrick | 34,990 | 166 | 210.8 | Houston Texans | 2014 | |
| 37 | Ryan Fitzpatrick | 34,990 | 166 | 210.8 | New York Jets | 2015–2016 | |
| 37 | Ryan Fitzpatrick | 34,990 | 166 | 210.8 | Tampa Bay Buccaneers | 2017–2018 | |
| 37 | Ryan Fitzpatrick | 34,990 | 166 | 210.8 | Miami Dolphins | 2019–2020 | |
| 37 | Ryan Fitzpatrick | 34,990 | 166 | 210.8 | Washington Football Team | 2021 | |
| 38 | Ryan Tannehill | 34,881 | 155 | 225 | Miami Dolphins | 2012–2018 | |
| 38 | Ryan Tannehill | 34,881 | 155 | 225 | Tennessee Titans | 2019–2023 | |
| 39 | Jim Everett | 34,837 | 158 | 220.5 | Los Angeles Rams | 1986–1993 | |
| 39 | Jim Everett | 34,837 | 158 | 220.5 | New Orleans Saints | 1994–1996 | |
| 39 | Jim Everett | 34,837 | 158 | 220.5 | San Diego Chargers | 1997 | |
| 40 | Jim Hart | 34,665 | 201 | 172.5 | St. Louis Cardinals | 1966–1983 | |
| 40 | Jim Hart | 34,665 | 201 | 172.5 | Washington Redskins | 1984 | |
| 41 | Steve DeBerg | 34,241 | 206 | 166.2 | San Francisco 49ers | 1978–1980 | |
| 41 | Steve DeBerg | 34,241 | 206 | 166.2 | Denver Broncos | 1981–1983 | |
| 41 | Steve DeBerg | 34,241 | 206 | 166.2 | Tampa Bay Buccaneers | 1984–1987, 1992–1993 (Note: DeBerg was cut during the 1993 season; he played three games for the Buccaneers and five for the Dolphins.) | |
| 41 | Steve DeBerg | 34,241 | 206 | 166.2 | Kansas City Chiefs | 1988–1991 | |
| 41 | Steve DeBerg | 34,241 | 206 | 166.2 | Miami Dolphins | 1993 | |
| 41 | Steve DeBerg | 34,241 | 206 | 166.2 | Atlanta Falcons | 1998 | |
| 42 | Tony Romo | 34,183 | 156 | 219.1 | Dallas Cowboys | 2003–2016 | |
| 43 | John Hadl | 33,503 | 224 | 149.6 | San Diego Chargers | 1962–1972 | |
| 43 | John Hadl | 33,503 | 224 | 149.6 | Los Angeles Rams | 1973–1974 (Note: Hadl was traded during the 1974 season; he played six games for the Rams and eight for the Packers.) | |
| 43 | John Hadl | 33,503 | 224 | 149.6 | Green Bay Packers | 1974–1975 | |
| 43 | John Hadl | 33,503 | 224 | 149.6 | Houston Oilers | 1976–1977 | |
| 44 | Phil Simms | 33,462 | 164 | 204 | New York Giants | 1979–1993 | |
| 45 | Steve Young† | 33,124 | 169 | 196 | Tampa Bay Buccaneers | 1985–1986 | |
| 45 | Steve Young† | 33,124 | 169 | 196 | San Francisco 49ers | 1987–1999 | |
| 46 | Y. A. Tittle† | 33,070 | 204 | 162.1 | Baltimore Colts | 1948–1950 | |
| 46 | Y. A. Tittle† | 33,070 | 204 | 162.1 | San Francisco 49ers | 1951–1960 | |
| 46 | Y. A. Tittle† | 33,070 | 204 | 162.1 | New York Giants | 1961–1964 | |
| 47 | Troy Aikman† | 32,942 | 165 | 199.6 | Dallas Cowboys | 1989–2000 | |
| 48 | Ken Anderson | 32,838 | 192 | 171 | Cincinnati Bengals | 1971–1986 | |
| 49 | Josh Allen^ | 32,629 | 138 | 236.4 | Buffalo Bills | 2018–present | |
| 50 | Cam Newton | 32,382 | 148 | 218.8 | Carolina Panthers | 2011–2019, 2021 | |
| 50 | Cam Newton | 32,382 | 148 | 218.8 | New England Patriots | 2020 | |
| Rank | Player | Yds | GP | YPG | Team(s) | Seasons | Refs |

== Playoff leaders ==
Through end of 2025–26 NFL playoffs. Based on at least 2,500 postseason passing yards.

| Rank | Player | Yds | GP | YPG | Team(s) | Seasons | Refs |
|---|---|---|---|---|---|---|---|
| 1 | Tom Brady | 13,400 | 48 | 279.2 | New England Patriots | 2000–2019 | |
| 1 | Tom Brady | 13,400 | 48 | 279.2 | Tampa Bay Buccaneers | 2020–2022 | |
| 2 | Peyton Manning† | 7,339 | 27 | 271.8 | Indianapolis Colts | 1998–2011 | |
| 2 | Peyton Manning† | 7,339 | 27 | 271.8 | Denver Broncos | 2012–2015 | |
| 3 | Aaron Rodgers^ | 6,040 | 23 | 262.6 | Green Bay Packers | 2005–2022 | |
| 3 | Aaron Rodgers^ | 6,040 | 23 | 262.6 | New York Jets | 2023–2024 | |
| 3 | Aaron Rodgers^ | 6,040 | 23 | 262.6 | Pittsburgh Steelers | 2025–present | |
| 4 | Ben Roethlisberger | 5,972 | 23 | 259.7 | Pittsburgh Steelers | 2004–2021 | |
| 5 | Brett Favre† | 5,855 | 24 | 244 | Atlanta Falcons | 1991 | |
| 5 | Brett Favre† | 5,855 | 24 | 244 | Green Bay Packers | 1992–2007 | |
| 5 | Brett Favre† | 5,855 | 24 | 244 | New York Jets | 2008 | |
| 5 | Brett Favre† | 5,855 | 24 | 244 | Minnesota Vikings | 2009–2010 | |
| 6 | Patrick Mahomes^ | 5,814 | 21 | 276.9 | Kansas City Chiefs | 2017–present | |
| 7 | Joe Montana† | 5,772 | 23 | 251 | San Francisco 49ers | 1979–1992 | |
| 7 | Joe Montana† | 5,772 | 23 | 251 | Kansas City Chiefs | 1993–1994 | |
| 8 | Drew Brees† | 5,366 | 18 | 298.1 | San Diego Chargers | 2001–2005 | |
| 8 | Drew Brees† | 5,366 | 18 | 298.1 | New Orleans Saints | 2006–2020 | |
| 9 | John Elway† | 4,964 | 22 | 225.6 | Denver Broncos | 1983–1998 | |
| 10 | Dan Marino† | 4,510 | 18 | 250.6 | Miami Dolphins | 1983–1999 | |
| 11 | Russell Wilson | 4,056 | 17 | 238.6 | Seattle Seahawks | 2012–2021 | |
| 11 | Russell Wilson | 4,056 | 17 | 238.6 | Denver Broncos | 2022–2023 | |
| 11 | Russell Wilson | 4,056 | 17 | 238.6 | Pittsburgh Steelers | 2024 | |
| 11 | Russell Wilson | 4,056 | 17 | 238.6 | New York Giants | 2025 | |
| 12 | Kurt Warner† | 3,952 | 13 | 304 | St. Louis Rams | 1998–2003 | |
| 12 | Kurt Warner† | 3,952 | 13 | 304 | New York Giants | 2004 | |
| 12 | Kurt Warner† | 3,952 | 13 | 304 | Arizona Cardinals | 2005 | |
| 13 | Matthew Stafford^ | 3,932 | 13 | 302.5 | Detroit Lions | 2009–2020 | |
| 13 | Matthew Stafford^ | 3,932 | 13 | 302.5 | Los Angeles Rams | 2021–present | |
| 14 | Josh Allen^ | 3,915 | 15 | 261 | Buffalo Bills | 2018–present | |
| 15 | Jim Kelly† | 3,863 | 17 | 227.2 | Buffalo Bills | 1986–1996 | |
| 16 | Troy Aikman† | 3,849 | 16 | 240.6 | Dallas Cowboys | 1989–2000 | |
| 17 | Terry Bradshaw† | 3,833 | 19 | 201.7 | Pittsburgh Steelers | 1970–1983 | |
| 18 | Donovan McNabb | 3,752 | 16 | 234.5 | Philadelphia Eagles | 1999–2009 | |
| 18 | Donovan McNabb | 3,752 | 16 | 234.5 | Washington Redskins | 2010 | |
| 18 | Donovan McNabb | 3,752 | 16 | 234.5 | Minnesota Vikings | 2011 | |
| 19 | Joe Flacco^ | 3,530 | 16 | 220.6 | Baltimore Ravens | 2008–2018 | |
| 19 | Joe Flacco^ | 3,530 | 16 | 220.6 | Denver Broncos | 2019 | |
| 19 | Joe Flacco^ | 3,530 | 16 | 220.6 | New York Jets | 2020, 2021–2022 | |
| 19 | Joe Flacco^ | 3,530 | 16 | 220.6 | Philadelphia Eagles | 2021 | |
| 19 | Joe Flacco^ | 3,530 | 16 | 220.6 | Cleveland Browns | 2023, 2025 | |
| 19 | Joe Flacco^ | 3,530 | 16 | 220.6 | Indianapolis Colts | 2024 | |
| 19 | Joe Flacco^ | 3,530 | 16 | 220.6 | Cincinnati Bengals | 2025–present | |
| 20 | Steve Young† | 3,326 | 22 | 151.2 | Tampa Bay Buccaneers | 1985–1986 | |
| 20 | Steve Young† | 3,326 | 22 | 151.2 | San Francisco 49ers | 1987–1999 | |
| 21 | Philip Rivers | 2,965 | 12 | 247.1 | San Diego/L.A. Chargers | 2004–2019 | |
| 21 | Philip Rivers | 2,965 | 12 | 247.1 | Indianapolis Colts | 2020, 2025 | |
| 22 | Warren Moon† | 2,870 | 10 | 287 | Houston Oilers | 1984–2003 | |
| 22 | Warren Moon† | 2,870 | 10 | 287 | Minnesota Vikings | 1994–1996 | |
| 22 | Warren Moon† | 2,870 | 10 | 287 | Seattle Seahawks | 1997–1998 | |
| 22 | Warren Moon† | 2,870 | 10 | 287 | Kansas City Chiefs | 1999–2000 | |
| 23 | Roger Staubach† | 2,817 | 20 | 140.9 | Dallas Cowboys | 1969–1979 | |
| 24 | Eli Manning | 2,815 | 12 | 234.6 | New York Giants | 2004–2019 | |
| 25 | Matt Hasselbeck | 2,741 | 11 | 249.2 | Green Bay Packers | 1998–2000 | |
| 25 | Matt Hasselbeck | 2,741 | 11 | 249.2 | Seattle Seahawks | 2001–2010 | |
| 25 | Matt Hasselbeck | 2,741 | 11 | 249.2 | Tennessee Titans | 2011–2012 | |
| 25 | Matt Hasselbeck | 2,741 | 11 | 249.2 | Indianapolis Colts | 2013–2015 | |
| 26 | Matt Ryan | 2,672 | 10 | 267.2 | Atlanta Falcons | 2008–2021 | |
| 26 | Matt Ryan | 2,672 | 10 | 267.2 | Indianapolis Colts | 2022 | |
| 27 | Ken Stabler† | 2,641 | 13 | 203.2 | Oakland Raiders | 1970–1979 | |
| 27 | Ken Stabler† | 2,641 | 13 | 203.2 | Houston Oilers | 1980–1981 | |
| 27 | Ken Stabler† | 2,641 | 13 | 203.2 | New Orleans Saints | 1982–1984 | |

== Historical passing yards leaders ==
Eleven players are recognized as having held the record as the NFL's career passing yardage leader. The longest record holder was Fran Tarkenton, who held the record for nineteen years.

| Reign | Player | Team(s) while leader | Career passing yards | Season(s) | Refs |
|---|---|---|---|---|---|
| 1932–1942 (11 years) | Arnie Herber† | Green Bay Packers | 639 | 1932 | |
| 1932–1942 (11 years) | Arnie Herber† | Green Bay Packers | 1,295 | 1933 | |
| 1932–1942 (11 years) | Arnie Herber† | Green Bay Packers | 2,094 | 1934 | |
| 1932–1942 (11 years) | Arnie Herber† | Green Bay Packers | 2,823 | 1935 | |
| 1932–1942 (11 years) | Arnie Herber† | Green Bay Packers | 4,062 | 1936 | |
| 1932–1942 (11 years) | Arnie Herber† | Green Bay Packers | 4,746 | 1937 | |
| 1932–1942 (11 years) | Arnie Herber† | Green Bay Packers | 5,082 | 1938 | |
| 1932–1942 (11 years) | Arnie Herber† | Green Bay Packers | 6,189 | 1939 | |
| 1932–1942 (11 years) | Arnie Herber† | Green Bay Packers | 6,749 | 1940–1942 | |
| 1943–1958 (16 years) | Sammy Baugh† | Washington Redskins | 8,379 | 1943 | |
| 1943–1958 (16 years) | Sammy Baugh† | Washington Redskins | 9,228 | 1944 | |
| 1943–1958 (16 years) | Sammy Baugh† | Washington Redskins | 10,897 | 1945 | |
| 1943–1958 (16 years) | Sammy Baugh† | Washington Redskins | 12,060 | 1946 | |
| 1943–1958 (16 years) | Sammy Baugh† | Washington Redskins | 14,998 | 1947 | |
| 1943–1958 (16 years) | Sammy Baugh† | Washington Redskins | 17,597 | 1948 | |
| 1943–1958 (16 years) | Sammy Baugh† | Washington Redskins | 19,500 | 1949 | |
| 1943–1958 (16 years) | Sammy Baugh† | Washington Redskins | 20,630 | 1950 | |
| 1943–1958 (16 years) | Sammy Baugh† | Washington Redskins | 21,734 | 1951 | |
| 1943–1958 (16 years) | Sammy Baugh† | Washington Redskins | 21,886 | 1952–1958 | |
| 1959–1963 (5 years) | Bobby Layne† | Pittsburgh Steelers | 22,063 | 1959 | |
| 1959–1963 (5 years) | Bobby Layne† | Pittsburgh Steelers | 23,877 | 1960 | |
| 1959–1963 (5 years) | Bobby Layne† | Pittsburgh Steelers | 25,082 | 1961 | |
| 1959–1963 (5 years) | Bobby Layne† | Pittsburgh Steelers | 26,768 | 1962–1963 | |
| 1964–1967 (4 years) | Y. A. Tittle† | New York Giants | 28,339 | 1964–1967 | |
| 1968–1975 (8 years) | Johnny Unitas† | Baltimore Colts (1968–1972); San Diego Chargers (1973) | 33,160 | 1968 | |
| 1968–1975 (8 years) | Johnny Unitas† | Baltimore Colts (1968–1972); San Diego Chargers (1973) | 35,502 | 1969 | |
| 1968–1975 (8 years) | Johnny Unitas† | Baltimore Colts (1968–1972); San Diego Chargers (1973) | 37,715 | 1970 | |
| 1968–1975 (8 years) | Johnny Unitas† | Baltimore Colts (1968–1972); San Diego Chargers (1973) | 38,657 | 1971 | |
| 1968–1975 (8 years) | Johnny Unitas† | Baltimore Colts (1968–1972); San Diego Chargers (1973) | 39,768 | 1972 | |
| 1968–1975 (8 years) | Johnny Unitas† | Baltimore Colts (1968–1972); San Diego Chargers (1973) | 40,239 | 1973–1975 | |
| 1976–1994 (19 years) | Fran Tarkenton† | Minnesota Vikings | 41,801 | 1976 | |
| 1976–1994 (19 years) | Fran Tarkenton† | Minnesota Vikings | 43,535 | 1977 | |
| 1976–1994 (19 years) | Fran Tarkenton† | Minnesota Vikings | 47,003 | 1978–1994 | |
| 1995–2006 (12 years) | Dan Marino† | Miami Dolphins | 48,841 | 1995 | |
| 1995–2006 (12 years) | Dan Marino† | Miami Dolphins | 51,636 | 1996 | |
| 1995–2006 (12 years) | Dan Marino† | Miami Dolphins | 55,416 | 1997 | |
| 1995–2006 (12 years) | Dan Marino† | Miami Dolphins | 58,913 | 1998 | |
| 1995–2006 (12 years) | Dan Marino† | Miami Dolphins | 61,361 | 1999–2006 | |
| 2007–2014 (8 years) | Brett Favre† | Green Bay Packers (2007); New York Jets (2008); Minnesota Vikings (2009–2010) | 61,655 | 2007 | |
| 2007–2014 (8 years) | Brett Favre† | Green Bay Packers (2007); New York Jets (2008); Minnesota Vikings (2009–2010) | 65,127 | 2008 | |
| 2007–2014 (8 years) | Brett Favre† | Green Bay Packers (2007); New York Jets (2008); Minnesota Vikings (2009–2010) | 69,329 | 2009 | |
| 2007–2014 (8 years) | Brett Favre† | Green Bay Packers (2007); New York Jets (2008); Minnesota Vikings (2009–2010) | 71,838 | 2010–2014 | |
| 2015–2017 (3 years) | Peyton Manning† | Denver Broncos | 71,940 | 2015–2017 | |
| 2018–2020 (3 years) | Drew Brees† | New Orleans Saints | 74,437 | 2018 | |
| 2018–2020 (3 years) | Drew Brees† | New Orleans Saints | 77,416 | 2019 | |
| 2018–2020 (3 years) | Drew Brees† | New Orleans Saints | 80,358 | 2020 | |
| Since 2021 (6 years) | Tom Brady | Tampa Bay Buccaneers | 84,520 | 2021 | |
| Since 2021 (6 years) | Tom Brady | Tampa Bay Buccaneers | 89,214 | 2022–present | |

== See also ==
- List of gridiron football quarterbacks passing statistics
- List of NFL annual passing yards leaders
- List of NFL career passing completions leaders
- List of NFL career passing touchdowns leaders
- List of NFL career quarterback wins leaders
- List of NFL individual records
