= Matt Prater =

American football player (born 1984)

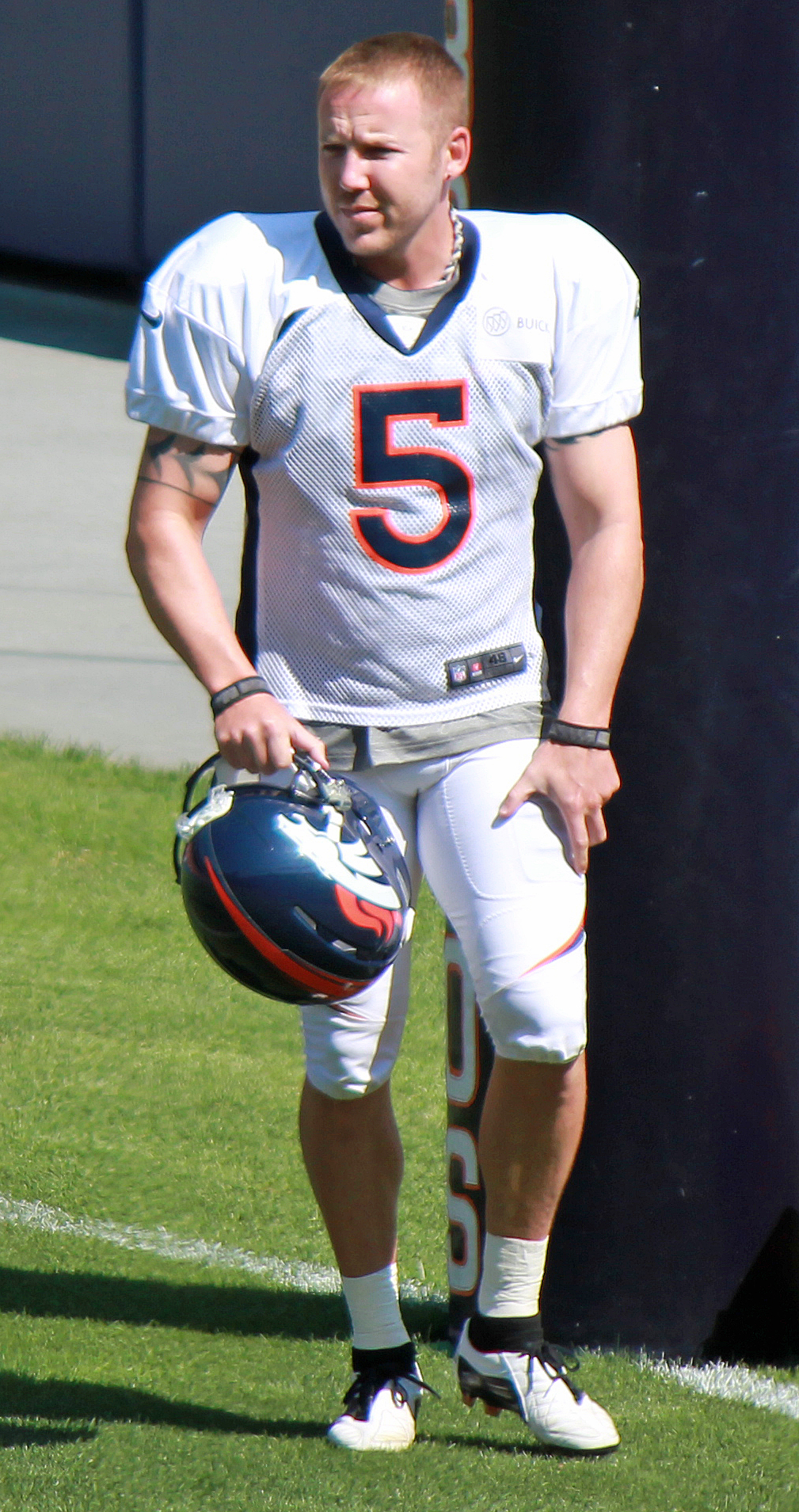
- Prater with the Denver Broncos in 2012

Profile
- Position: Placekicker

Personal information
- Born: August 10, 1984 (age 42); Mayfield Heights, Ohio, U.S.
- Listed height: 5 ft 10 in (1.78 m)
- Listed weight: 175 lb (79 kg)

Career information
- High school: Estero (Estero, Florida)
- College: UCF (2002–2005)
- NFL draft: 2006: undrafted

Career history
- Detroit Lions (2006)*; Miami Dolphins (2007)*; Atlanta Falcons (2007); Miami Dolphins (2007)*; Denver Broncos (2007–2014); Detroit Lions (2014–2020); Arizona Cardinals (2021–2024); Buffalo Bills (2025)
- * Offseason or practice squad member only

Awards and highlights
- Second-team All-Pro (2013); 2× Pro Bowl (2013, 2016); Second-team All-American (2003); ESPN Sport Science Newton Award (2014); NFL record: Most 50+ yard field goals made in NFL history: 81; Most extra points in a season: 75 (2013)

Career NFL statistics as of 2025
- Field goals made: 425
- Field goals attempted: 507
- Field goal %: 83.8%
- Extra points made: 633
- Extra points attempted: 652
- Extra point %: 97.1%
- Points: 1,908
- Longest field goal: 64
- Touchbacks: 489
- Stats at Pro Football Reference

Matthew Phillip Prater (born August 10, 1984) is an American professional football placekicker. Regarded as one of the best long-distance kickers in NFL history, he held the NFL record for longest field goal (64 yards) from 2013 until 2021 and holds the NFL record for most 50+ yard field goals in a career with 83. Prater is 13th in NFL history in field goals made, with 425, and has the second most field goals made by an active NFL player, six shy of Nick Folk's 431.

He played college football for the UCF Knights, and was originally signed by the Lions as an undrafted free agent in 2006. He was cut by the Denver Broncos after completing a suspension for violating the NFL's substance abuse policy. With the Lions in the 2016 and 2017 seasons, Prater set the NFL records for consecutive field goal conversions of 50+ yards (14 field goals) and 55+ yards (seven field goals).

== Early life ==
Prater attended Estero High School in Estero, Florida. During his high school football career with the Wildcats, he converted 56 of 58 extra point attempts and 14 field goals, including one of 49 yards. Prater converted 84% of his kickoffs in the end zone for touchbacks. He was named second-team All-State, first-team all-conference and All-Southwest Florida. He was also selected to the second-team "Dream Team." Prater graduated from Estero High School in 2002. Prater transferred to Estero High School his sophomore year from Cypress Lake High School.

== College career ==
Prater attended and played college football for UCF from 2002 to 2005.

=== 2002 ===
Prater showed signs of his leg strength with his first kick of his collegiate career, making a 53-yard attempt against Penn State. Overall, in his first season kicking for the Golden Knights, he finished with 44-of-47 extra points converted and 14-of-21 field goals converted.

=== 2003 ===
Prater showed significant improvement as a sophomore in 2003, leading the nation in punting and setting school and Mid American Conference (MAC) records with 47.9 yards per punt. He is known as the perfectionist of the Rugby punt, which is now well known through the NCAA and is used by several teams. As a kicker, he converted 10-of-13 field goal attempts and was a perfect 4-for-4 on attempts of 40 yards or longer. Prater had a career day against Virginia Tech on August 31. He punted six times and had a 55.7-yard average, including punts of 71 and 67 yards. He also went 4-for-4 on extra points and had three touchbacks on kickoffs. Overall, he finished the 2003 season with 23-of-24 extra points converted and 10-of-13 field goals converted. In addition, he had 58 punts for 2,781 net yards for a 47.9 average.

=== 2004 ===
In 2004, Prater continued to provide kicking duties for the Golden Knights. Aaron Horne took over most of the punting duties. He appeared in nine games before missing the rest of the season with a leg injury. At one point during the season, he made 11 consecutive field goals – the second-longest streak in school history. The streak was snapped against Buffalo on October 4. Overall, he finished the 2004 season with 12-of-14 extra points converted and 9-of-14 field goals converted.

=== 2005 ===
As a senior in 2005, Prater made 17-of-26 field goal attempts on the year, including a season-long 49-yard conversion. He also went 29-for-32 on point-after attempts. He punted four times for 160 yards during the season. In his final collegiate game, Prater set up a textbook onside kick, which allowed UCF to tie the game. However, in the first overtime, he missed an extra point, which dubbed him as the player that cost UCF the game and gave Nevada a 49–48 victory in the 2005 Hawaii Bowl.

In 46 games spanning four years with UCF, Prater converted 50 of 74 field goal attempts, with a long of 53 yards. His 50 field goals ties him for the school record, while his 258 points ranks him fourth all-time in school history.

== Professional career ==
Pre-draft measurables
Height	Weight	40-yard dash
5 ft 9 5/8 in (1.77 m)	166 lb (75 kg)	4.67 s
All values from Pro Day

=== Detroit Lions (first stint) ===
Prater was signed by the Detroit Lions as an undrafted free agent on May 4, 2006. He made field goals of 22, 44, and 48 yards in a preseason game against the Cleveland Browns, but had little chance of beating out veteran incumbent Jason Hanson and was subsequently released August 27. He spent the rest of the season as a free agent, but did have workouts with the Green Bay Packers and Minnesota Vikings.

=== Miami Dolphins (first stint) ===
Prater was signed to a future deal by the Miami Dolphins on January 11, 2007. He was released by the team on August 27, as veteran Jay Feely won the job.

=== Atlanta Falcons ===
Shortly thereafter, Prater signed a contract with the Atlanta Falcons and beat out Billy Cundiff for the job. Including the Falcons' preseason finale, Prater missed at least one field goal in three games played with the Falcons. Prater missed two field goals against the Jacksonville Jaguars in Week 2 and was cut on September 18. The Falcons signed Morten Andersen as his replacement.

=== Miami Dolphins (second stint) ===
The Dolphins signed Prater to their practice squad on November 15, 2007.

=== Denver Broncos ===
==== 2007 ====
The Denver Broncos signed Prater off the Dolphins' practice squad on December 19, 2007.

==== 2008 ====
Prater became the starting kicker for the Denver Broncos, replacing Jason Elam who signed with the Falcons. The Broncos had waived Garrett Hartley on July 21, 2008, leaving Prater as the only kicker on the Denver roster going into their first preseason game against the Houston Texans. On September 28, 2008, Prater made a 56-yard field goal late in the first half of the Broncos' loss at the Kansas City Chiefs, which was the third longest field goal in team history and the longest away from Denver. He made two field goals of more than 50 yards during the game.

On October 5, 2008, Prater converted three out of three field goals, including a 55-yarder, as part of a 16–13 Broncos home win over the Tampa Bay Buccaneers. He also recorded four touchbacks out of five kickoffs. His performance during the game led to him being named American Football Conference (AFC) Special Teams Player of the Week for Week 5 of the 2008 NFL season. Prater won the award for the first time in his career.

Despite completing five of six field goals from beyond 50 yards on the season, he was only 25-of-34 overall (73.5%), making him one of the most inaccurate kickers in the league for the season.

==== 2009 ====
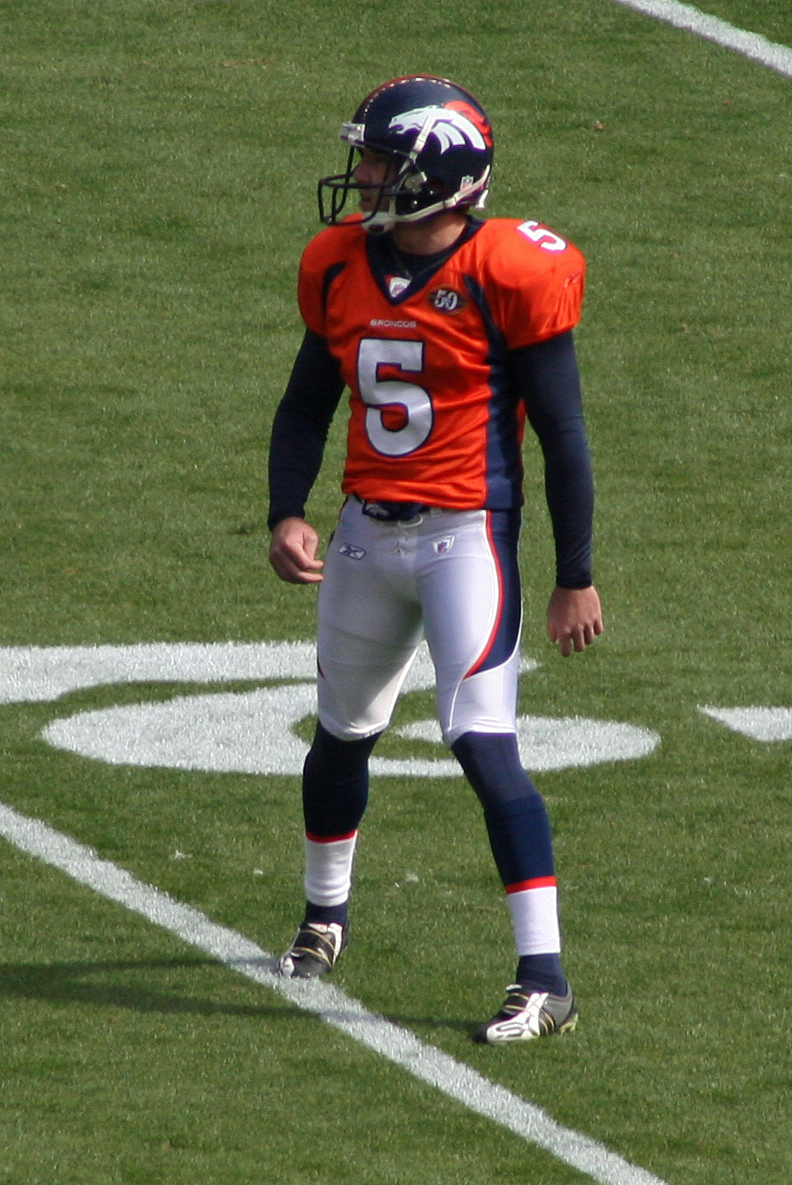
Prater with the Denver Broncos in 2009

Prater improved in the 2009 season converting all 32 extra point attempts and 30-of-35 field goal attempts. In Week 12, he converted two extra points and all four field goal attempts against the New York Giants in the 26–6 victory. His performance earned him his second AFC Special Teams Player of the Week nomination.

==== 2010 ====
On March 9, 2010, the Broncos re-signed Prater to a new contract. On December 23, 2010, Prater was put on injury reserve by the Broncos after suffering a right groin injury. Overall, he finished the 2010 season having converted 28-of-29 extra point attempts and 16-of-18 field goal attempts.

==== 2011 ====
On July 29, 2011, Prater re-signed with the Broncos. At 3:00 am August 2, Prater was arrested and charged with DUI and leaving the scene of an accident at a hotel while in the company of a female employee of Shotgun Willie's, a local Glendale strip club. On December 11, 2011, in a game against the Chicago Bears, Prater kicked a 59-yard field goal with three seconds remaining to tie the game. He then followed up by kicking a 51-yard field goal to win the game in overtime, 13–10. The performance earned his third career Special Teams Player of the Week nomination. Overall, he finished the 2011 season converting all 30 extra point attempts to go along with 19-of-25 field goal attempts.

==== 2012 ====
On July 2, 2012, Prater re-signed with the Broncos on a four-year contract after the Broncos placed a franchise tag on him. In Week 4, against the Oakland Raiders, he converted four extra point attempts and three field goal attempts to earn AFC Special Teams Player of the Week. On the 2012 season, he converted all 55 extra point attempts to go along with 26-of-32 field goal attempts.

==== 2013 ====
On October 6, 2013, when the Broncos faced the Dallas Cowboys, with a 48–48 score with two seconds left in regulation, Prater kicked the game-winning 28 yard field goal, to allow a Broncos 51–48 victory, as Denver went 5–0 for the first time since 2009. On December 8, Prater set a new NFL record by successfully kicking a 64-yard field goal against the Tennessee Titans as time expired in the first half. Prater also set a new NFL record for extra points in a single season, with 75. He earned AFC Special Teams Player of the Week honors for the performance. In the AFC Championship against the New England Patriots, he converted all four field goal attempts in the 26–16 victory. He appeared in his first Super Bowl in the following game, a 43–8 loss to the Seattle Seahawks.

==== 2014 ====
Prater began the season with a four-game suspension for violating the NFL's substance abuse policy. On October 3, 2014, Prater was released by the Broncos after they decided to stick with his replacement Brandon McManus.

=== Detroit Lions (second stint) ===
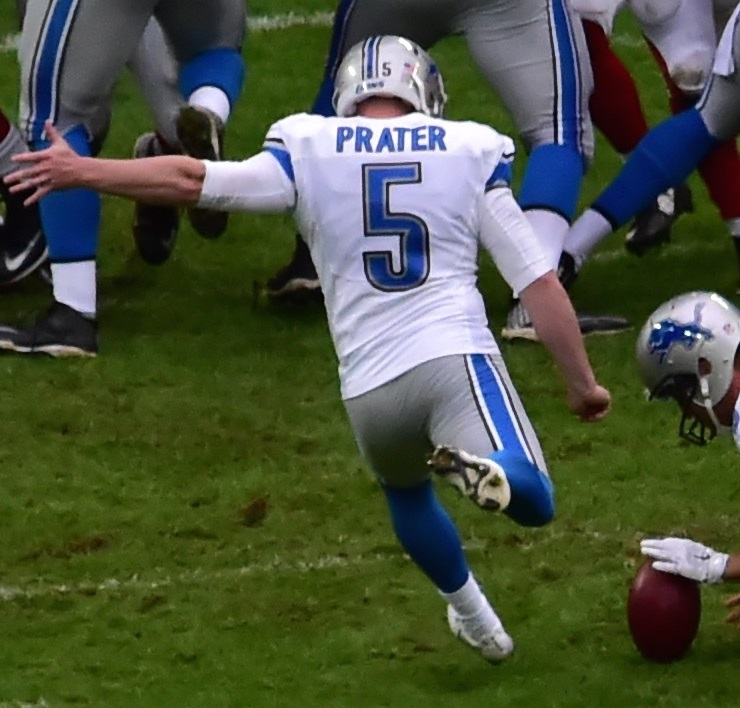
Prater with the Detroit Lions in 2014

==== 2014 ====
On October 7, 2014, the Lions signed him to a one-year deal. Prater was Detroit's third kicker in only a little over a month after Nate Freese and Alex Henery had struggles in the kicking game. In Prater's debut as a Lion, he only made one of three attempts on a rather windy day at TCF Bank Stadium, but the Lions still got the win over the Vikings. Two weeks later, Prater missed a game-winning 43 yard field goal against the Falcons in London, but due to a delay of game penalty on Detroit, was allowed to re-kick from 48 yards out from which he converted, winning the game for the Lions. He finished the year converting 21 field goals on 26 attempts.

==== 2015 ====
On March 6, 2015, the Lions re-signed Prater to a three-year, $9 million contract extension. In a game against the Chicago Bears, Prater kicked a 37-yard field goal in overtime to win the game, 37–34. In a game against the Chicago Bears on January 3, 2016, Prater made a 59-yard field goal, which set a Detroit Lions franchise record for the longest field goal. Overall, on the 2015 season, he finished with converting 36-of-39 extra point attempts and 22-of-24 field goal attempts.

==== 2016 ====
Prater was named National Football Conference (NFC) Special Teams Player of the Week for Week 9 when he converted three field goal attempts, including a 58-yard attempt with 0:02 left to send the game into overtime, where the Lions would beat the Vikings. Prater was also named NFC Special Teams Player of the Week for Week 12 when he converted the game tying and game winning attempts to beat the Vikings in the final two minutes. To cap off his performances, Prater won NFC Special Teams Player of the Month going 8-for-8 on field goals with two over 50 yards. He once again earned Special Teams Player of the Week for Week 13 when he made five field goals, including a 52-yarder, in a 28–13 win over the Saints. Prater was named to his second Pro Bowl as an alternate for Falcons kicker Matt Bryant after the 2016 season. He finished the 2016 season converting 31-of-33 extra point attempts to go along with 31-of-36 field goal attempts.

==== 2017 ====
In Week 1, Prater had to take over punting duties after Kasey Redfern left with an injury early in the game. He kicked a 58-yard field goal, went 2-for-2 on extra points and punted four times with an average of 35 yards in a 35–23 win over the Arizona Cardinals, earning him NFC Special Teams Player of the Week. Prater was named NFC Special Teams Player of the Month for September after making all six of his field goal attempts, including four conversions from 55 yards and longer. This gave Prater an NFL record seven straight field goals of 55 yards or longer without a miss, going back to 2016. Prater had also converted 14 consecutive 50+ yard field goals going back to the previous season, which is also an NFL record. Both streaks ended when Prater missed on a 59-yard attempt the following week against the Vikings. On October 25, 2017, Prater signed a three-year contract extension with the Lions. Overall, he finished the 2017 season converting 40-of-41 extra point attempts to go along with 30-of-35 field goal attempts as the Lions went 9–7.

Against the Packers at Lambeau Field, Prater threw a 14-yard touchdown to Levine Toilolo on a fake field goal attempt. He added a field goal and four extra points in a 31–0 win over the Packers, earning him NFC Special Teams Player of the Week. He finished the 2018 season converting all 30 extra point attempts to go along with 28-of-32 field goal attempts as the Lions went 6–10.

==== 2019 ====
In the 2019 season, Prater finished 35 of 36 on extra point attempts and 26 of 31 on field goal attempts as the Lions went 3–12–1.

==== 2020 ====
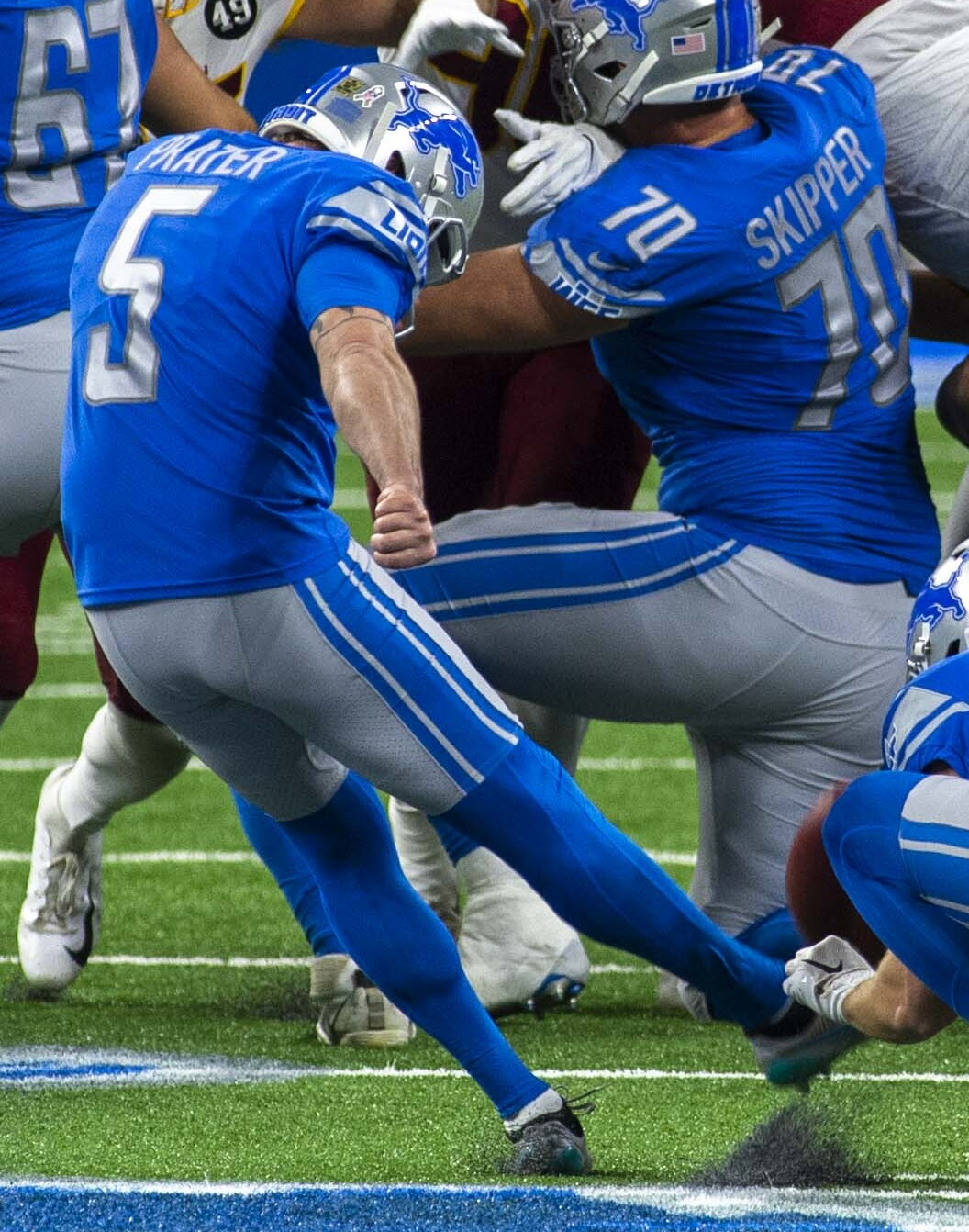
Prater with the Detroit Lions in 2020

In Week 3 against the Cardinals, Prater finished the game with two extra points and four field goals made, including the game winner during the 26–23 win. He was named the NFC Special Teams Player of the Week for his performance in Week 3. In Week 10 against the Washington Football Team, Prater kicked a 59-yard field goal as time expired to win the game 30–27, earning his second NFC Special Teams Player of the Week honors of the season. On January 3, 2021, Prater set the new NFL record for most career field goals of 50 yards or more. In the 2020 season, Prater converted 21-of-28 field goal attempts and 38-of-41 extra point attempts.

=== Arizona Cardinals ===
==== 2021 ====
On March 17, 2021, Prater signed with the Cardinals on a two–year deal. On September 26, 2021, on the last play of the first half against the Jaguars, Prater attempted to break his record 64 yard field goal from 2013 with a would–be record 68 yard field goal, but the kick fell short and was returned 109 yards for a touchdown by Jamal Agnew. Later that day, Baltimore Ravens kicker Justin Tucker broke Prater's record with a game winning 66 yard field goal on the last play of the Ravens' game against the Lions. In Week 6, Prater made three field goals and all four extra points in a 37–14 win against the Browns. For his performance he was awarded NFC Special Teams Player of the Week. In Week 17, Prater connected on all four field goal attempts and one extra point, accounting for 13 points, in a 25–22 win over the Cowboys, earning NFC Special Teams Player of the Week. in the 2021 season, Prater converted 30 of 37 field-goal attempts and 47 of 49 extra point attempts.

==== 2022 ====
In the 2022 season, Prater converted 22 of 25 field goal attempts and 17 of 18 extra point attempts in 13 games.

==== 2023 ====
Prater agreed to a two-year contract extension on March 14, 2023. In Week 3, Prater was named NFC Special Teams Player of the Week after converting a 62-yard field goal at the end of the first half against the Cowboys. In Week 18, against the Seattle Seahawks, Prater missed 2 field goals, one from 43 with three minutes left in the 4th quarter, and a missed 50 yard game winning field goal at the end of regulation. As a result, Seattle won the game 21–20. In the 2023 season, he converted 28 of 33 field goal attempts and 22 of 23 extra point attempts in 17 games.

==== 2024 ====
Prater suffered a torn meniscus in his plant leg ahead of week 5 in the 2024 season. He was replaced in that week's game and in week 6 by Chad Ryland before being placed on injured reserve on October 15, 2024.

=== Buffalo Bills ===
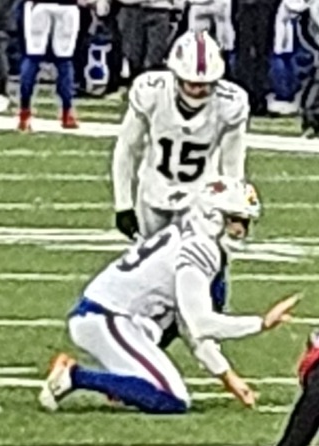
Prater (15) with the Buffalo Bills in 2025

On September 4, 2025, Prater was signed to the Buffalo Bills' practice squad after an injury to Tyler Bass. Three days later, on September 7, Prater made all three field goal attempts, including the 32-yard game-winning kick to help the Bills beat the Baltimore Ravens 41–40 as time expired. He was signed to the active roster on September 9. In the 2025 season, Prater appeared in 15 games, converting 46 of 49 extra point attempts and 18 of 20 field goal attempts.

== Career statistics ==
=== NFL ===
Legend
	NFL record
	Led the league
**Bold**	Career high

==== Regular season ====
Year	Team	GP	Field goals				Extra points			Points
Year	Team	GP	FGA	FGM	Pct	Lng	XPA	XPM	Pct	Points
2007	ATL	2	4	1	25.0	45	1	1	**100.0**	4
2007	DEN	2	—	—	—	—	—	—	—	—
2008	DEN	16	34	25	73.5	56	40	39	97.5	114
2009	DEN	16	35	30	85.7	51	32	32	**100.0**	122
2010	DEN	12	18	16	88.9	59	29	28	96.6	76
2011	DEN	16	25	19	76.0	59	30	30	**100.0**	87
2012	DEN	16	32	26	81.3	53	55	55	**100.0**	133
2013	DEN	16	26	25	96.2	**64**	**75**	**75**	**100.0**	**150**
2014	DEN	0	Suspended							
2014	DET	11	26	21	80.8	52	21	21	**100.0**	84
2015	DET	16	24	22	91.7	59	39	36	92.3	102
2016	DET	16	36	**31**	86.1	58	33	31	93.9	124
2017	DET	16	35	30	85.7	58	41	40	97.6	130
2018	DET	16	32	28	87.5	54	30	30	**100.0**	114
2019	DET	16	31	26	83.9	56	36	35	94.7	113
2020	DET	16	28	21	75.0	59	41	38	92.7	101
2021	ARI	**17**	**37**	30	81.1	62	49	47	95.9	137
2022	ARI	13	25	22	88.0	57	18	17	94.4	83
2023	ARI	**17**	33	28	84.8	62	23	22	95.7	106
2024	ARI	4	6	6	**100.0**	57	10	10	**100.0**	28
2025	BUF	15	20	18	90.0	52	49	46	93.9	100
Career		269	507	425	83.8	64	652	633	97.1	1908

==== Postseason ====
Year	Team	GP	Field goals				Extra points			Points
Year	Team	GP	FGA	FGM	Pct	Lng	XPA	XPM	Pct	Points
2011	DEN	2	4	4	**100.0**	41	3	3	**100.0**	15
2012	DEN	1	1	0	0.0	—	5	5	**100.0**	5
2013	DEN	**3**	**6**	**5**	83.0	54	5	5	**100.0**	20
2014	DET	1	2	2	**100.0**	39	2	2	**100.0**	8
2016	DET	1	2	2	**100.0**	53	—	—	—	6
2021	ARI	1	1	1	**100.0**	**55**	—	—	—	3
2025	BUF	2	5	**5**	**100.0**	50	**6**	**6**	**100.0**	**21**
Career		11	19	21	90.5	55	21	21	100.0	78

=== College ===
Year	School	Conf	Class	Pos	G	Kicking							Punting		
Year	School	Conf	Class	Pos	G	**XPM**	**XPA**	**XP%**	**FGM**	**FGA**	**FG%**	**Pts**	**Punts**	**Yds**	**Avg**
2002	UCF	MAC	FR	K	12	44	47	93.6	14	21	66.7	86	0	0	0
2003	UCF	MAC	SO	K	12	23	24	95.8	10	13	76.9	53	58	2,781	47.9
2004	UCF	MAC	JR	K	9	12	14	85.7	9	14	64.3	39	6	263	43.8
2005	UCF	CUSA	SR	K	13	29	32	90.6	17	26	65.4	80	4	160	40.0
**Career**	**UCF**					**108**	**117**	**92.3**	**50**	**74**	**67.6**	**258**	**68**	**3,204**	**47.1**

== Career highlights ==
=== Awards and honors ===
NFL

- Second-team All-Pro (2013)
- 2× Pro Bowl (2013, 2016)
- 5× AFC Special Teams Player of the Week – Week 5 (2008), Week 13 (2009) Week 14 (2011), Week 4 (2012), Week 14 (2013)
- 2× AFC Special Teams Player of the Month – September (2009), December (2011)
- 9× NFC Special Teams Player of the Week – Week 9 (2016), Week 12 (2016), Week 13 (2016), Week 1 (2017), Week 17 (2018), Week 3 (2020), Week 10 (2020), Week 6 (2021), Week 3 (2023)
- 2× NFC Special Teams Player of the Month – November (2016), September (2017)
- ESPN Sport Science Newton Award (2014)

College

- Second-team All-American (2003)

=== NFL records ===
- Most 50+ yard field goals made in NFL history: 81
- Most extra points in a season: 75 (2013)
