= List of most career field goals in NFL history =

Most career field goals

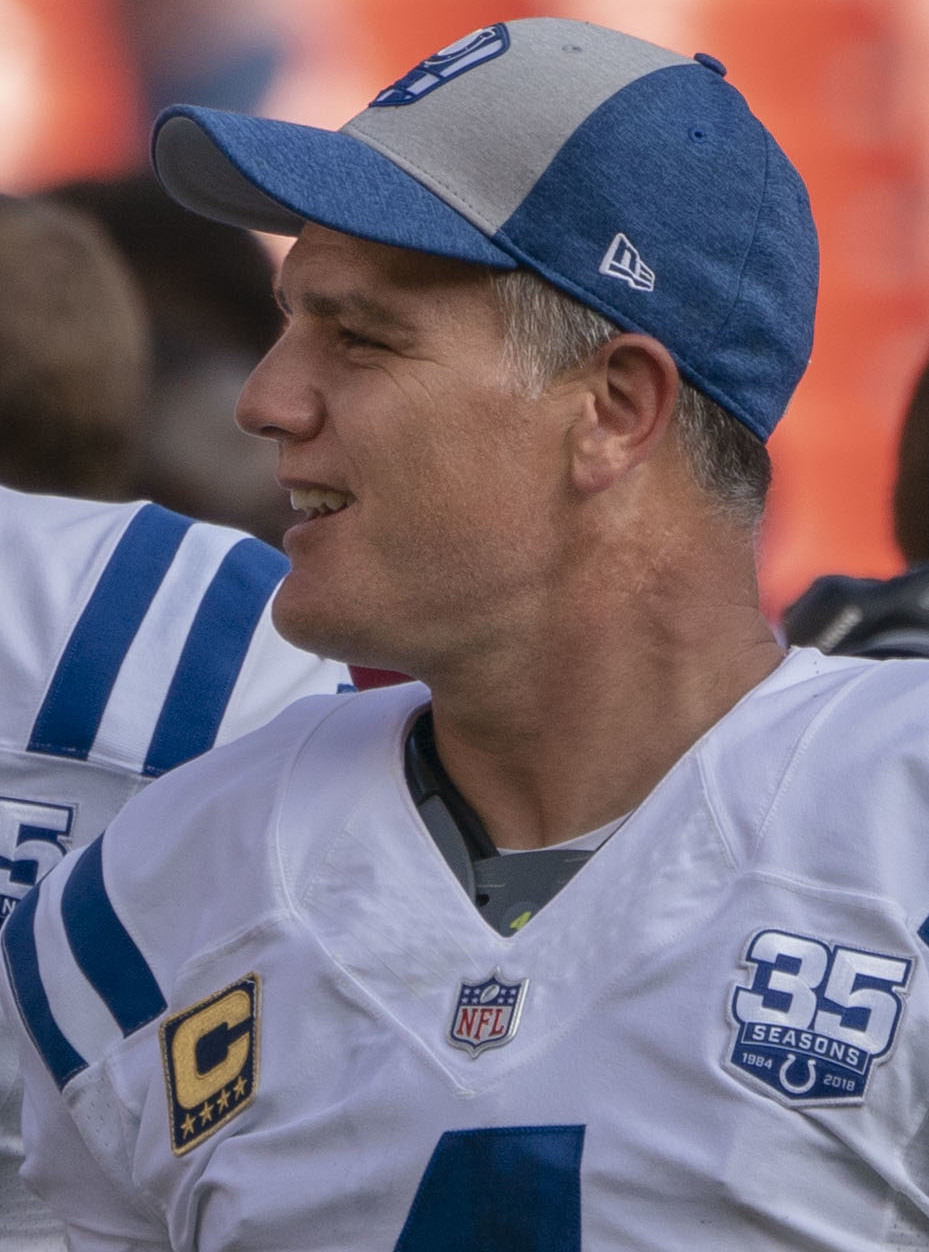
Adam Vinatieri has completed 599 career field goals

This article contains a full list of the 20 kickers with the most career field goals completed in National Football League history. Adam Vinatieri has the most career field goals made with 599.

Key
^ Inducted into the Pro Football Hall of Fame
* Active player

Most Field Goals Made
	Name	FG	Teams
1	Adam Vinatieri^	599	New England Patriots (1996–2005); Indianapolis Colts (2006–2019)
2	Morten Andersen^	565	New Orleans Saints (1982–1994); Atlanta Falcons (1995–2000) & (2006–2007); New York Giants (2001); Kansas City Chiefs (2002–2003); Minnesota Vikings (2004)
3	Gary Anderson	538	Pittsburgh Steelers (1982–1994); Philadelphia Eagles (1995–1996); San Francisco 49ers (1997); Minnesota Vikings (1998–2002); Tennessee Titans (2003–2004)
4	Jason Hanson	495	Detroit Lions (1992–2012)
5	John Carney	478	Tampa Bay Buccaneers (1987–1989); Los Angeles Rams (1990); San Diego Chargers (1990–2000); New Orleans Saints (2001–2006) & (2009–2010); Jacksonville Jaguars (2007); Kansas City Chiefs (2007); New York Giants (2008)
6	Matt Stover	471	New York Giants (1990); Cleveland Browns (1991–1995); Baltimore Ravens (1996–2008); Indianapolis Colts (2009)
7	John Kasay	461	Seattle Seahawks (1991–1994); Carolina Panthers (1995–2010); New Orleans Saints (2011)
8	Robbie Gould	447	Chicago Bears (2005–2015); New York Giants (2016); San Francisco 49ers (2017–2022)
9	Nick Folk	444	Dallas Cowboys (2007–2009); New York Jets (2010–2016); Tampa Bay Buccaneers (2017); New England Patriots (2019–2022); Tennessee Titans (2023–2024); New York Jets (2025); Atlanta Falcons (2026)
10	Phil Dawson	441	Cleveland Browns (1999–2012); San Francisco 49ers (2013–2016); Arizona Cardinals (2017–2018)
11	Jason Elam	436	Denver Broncos (1993–2007); Atlanta Falcons (2008–2009)
12	Sebastian Janikowski	436	Oakland Raiders (2000–2017); Seattle Seahawks (2018)
13	Matt Prater	425	Atlanta Falcons (2007); Denver Broncos (2007–2013); Detroit Lions (2014–2020); Arizona Cardinals (2021–2024); Buffalo Bills (2025)
14	Justin Tucker	417	Baltimore Ravens (2012–2024)
15	Mason Crosby	400	Green Bay Packers (2007–2022); New York Giants (2023)
16	Matt Bryant	397	Frankfurt Galaxy (2002); New York Giants (2002–2003); Indianapolis Colts (2004); Miami Dolphins (2004); Tampa Bay Buccaneers (2005–2008); Atlanta Falcons (2009–2019)
17	Stephen Gostkowski	392	New England Patriots (2006–2019); Tennessee Titans (2020)
18	David Akers	386	Washington Redskins (1998); Berlin Thunder (1999); Philadelphia Eagles (1999–2010); San Francisco 49ers (2011–2012); Detroit Lions (2013)
19	Nick Lowery	383	New England Patriots (1978); Kansas City Chiefs (1980–1993); New York Jets (1994–1996)
20	Jan Stenerud^	373	Kansas City Chiefs (1967–1979); Green Bay Packers (1980–1983); Minnesota Vikings (1984–1985)
