= Mac Jones =

American football player (born 1998)

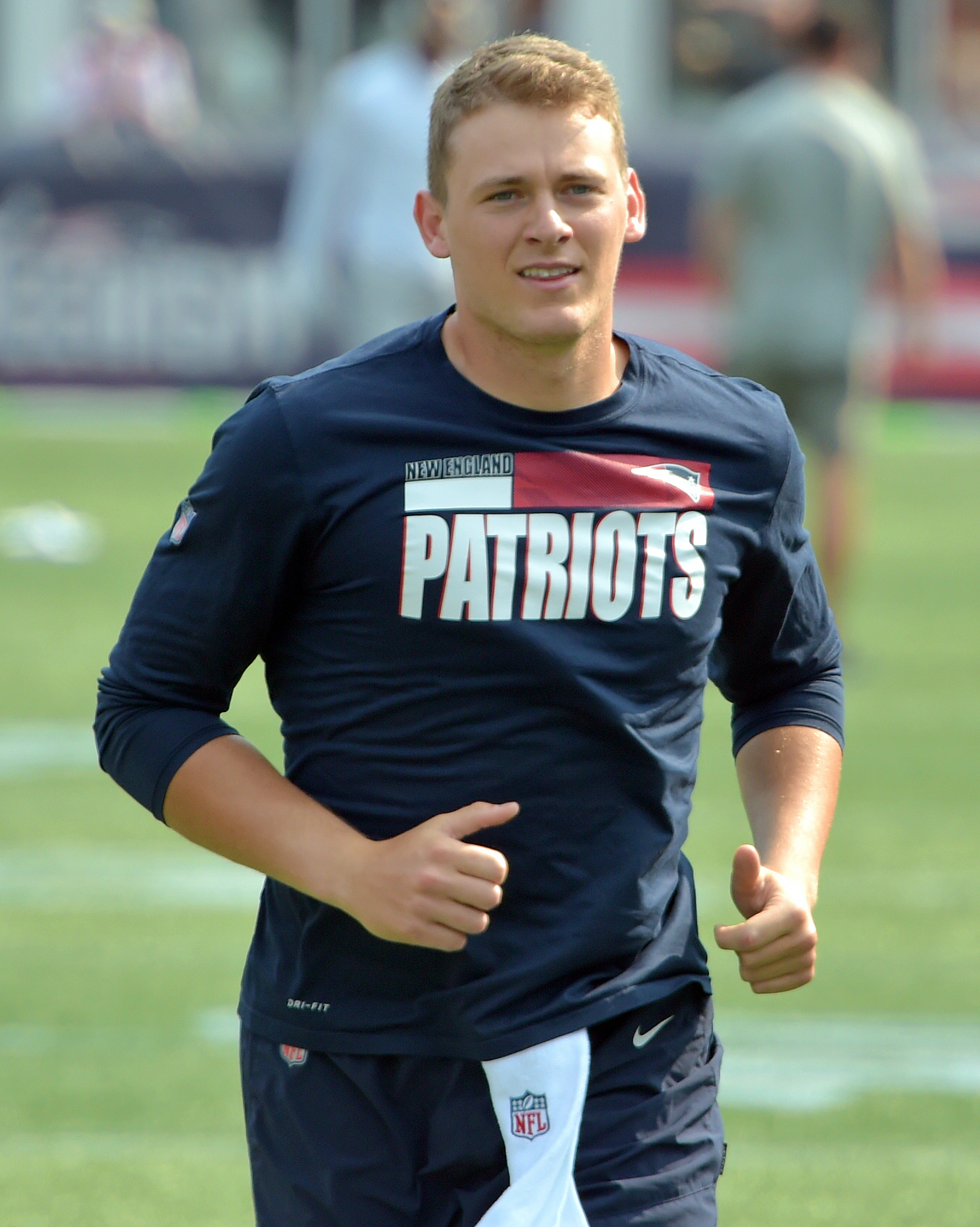
- Jones with the New England Patriots in 2021

No. 10 – San Francisco 49ers
- Position: Quarterback
- Roster status: Active

Personal information
- Born: September 5, 1998 (age 28); Jacksonville, Florida, U.S.
- Listed height: 6 ft 3 in (1.91 m)
- Listed weight: 220 lb (100 kg)

Career information
- High school: The Bolles School (Jacksonville)
- College: Alabama (2017–2020)
- NFL draft: 2021: 1st round, 15th overall pick

Career history
- New England Patriots (2021–2023); Jacksonville Jaguars (2024); San Francisco 49ers (2025–present)

Awards and highlights
- Pro Bowl (2021); PFWA All-Rookie Team (2021); 2× CFP national champion (2017, 2020); Johnny Unitas Golden Arm Award (2020); Davey O'Brien Award (2020); Manning Award (2020); Consensus All-American (2020); NCAA completion percentage leader (2020); NCAA passing yards leader (2020); NCAA passer rating leader (2020); First-team All-SEC (2020); NCAA (FBS) record: Highest career passing yard average: 11.0

Career NFL statistics as of Week 9, 2026
- Passing attempts: 1,859
- Passing completions: 1,236
- Completion percentage: 66.5%
- TD–INT: 67–50
- Passing yards: 12,741
- Passer rating: 86.9
- Rushing yards: 474
- Rushing touchdowns: 2
- Stats at Pro Football Reference

Michael McCorkle "Mac" Jones (born September 5, 1998) is an American professional football quarterback for the San Francisco 49ers of the National Football League (NFL). He played college football for the Alabama Crimson Tide, setting the NCAA season records for passer rating and completion percentage in 2020 en route to winning the 2021 College Football Playoff National Championship. Jones also received Johnny Unitas Golden Arm, Davey O'Brien, and Manning awards. He was selected by the New England Patriots in the first round of the 2021 NFL draft.

Jones had a successful rookie year, leading the Patriots to a playoff berth and earning Pro Bowl honors. After struggling during his next two seasons, Jones lost his starting position in 2023 and was traded to the Jacksonville Jaguars the following year. Jones signed with the 49ers in 2025.

== Early life ==
Michael McCorkle Jones was born on September 5, 1998, to Gordon and Holly Jones in Jacksonville, Florida. His father played tennis at Florida State University and Flagler College. Jones' brother, Will, played soccer at Mercer University; his sister, Sarah Jane, played tennis for the College of Charleston. Jones worked as a child model and actor, appearing in commercials.

Jones played high school football at The Bolles School in Jacksonville, Florida, under head coach Corky Rogers. As a junior in 2015, Jones led Bolles to the state regional final. As a senior in 2016, he led Bolles to the Florida 4A title, throwing for 1,532 yards and 29 touchdowns.

== College career ==
=== 2017 ===
After originally committing to the University of Kentucky, Jones accepted a scholarship offer from the University of Alabama to play for the Crimson Tide. He arrived as an early enrollee, but was redshirted his freshman season in 2017. Jones was charged with driving under the influence (DUI) and was suspended for the following game against LSU. After throwing for 289 yards and two touchdowns in the Crimson Tide's spring game, Jones was named A-Day MVP.

=== 2018 ===
In the 2018 season, Jones appeared in 14 of the Crimson Tide's 15 games, mostly as a holder on special teams. He added his name to the Alabama record book with a 94-yard touchdown pass to Jaylen Waddle, the second-longest in school history, in a victory over Louisiana.

=== 2019 ===
Jones served as the starting quarterback near the end of the 2019 season after Tua Tagovailoa suffered a severe hip injury. He made four starts for the Crimson Tide, beating Arkansas and Western Carolina before falling to Auburn in the Iron Bowl. Jones threw for 335 yards, four touchdowns, and two interceptions in the 48–45 loss. Following the Iron Bowl, Jones led Alabama to a 35–16 victory over Michigan in the Citrus Bowl. He finished the 2019 season with 1,503 passing yards, 14 touchdowns, and three interceptions in 11 games and four starts.

During his sophomore year, Jones earned a bachelor's degree in communication studies with a 4.00 GPA. After the commencement ceremony, Jones announced that he would return to Alabama as a graduate student.

=== 2020 ===
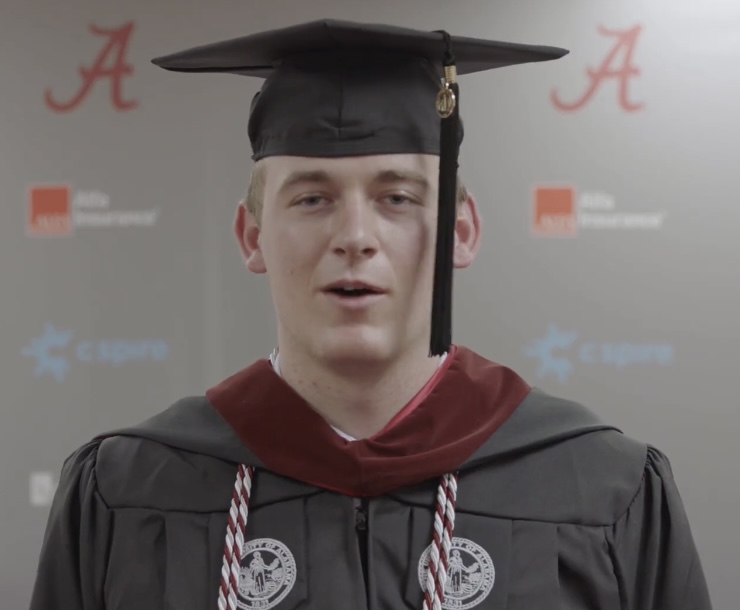
Jones in 2020

With Tagovailoa departing for the 2020 NFL draft, Jones took over as the starting quarterback for Alabama. In a game against the #3 ranked Georgia Bulldogs, he threw for 417 yards and four touchdowns, helping Alabama win 41–24. On October 31, Jones and the Crimson Tide shut out Mississippi State 41–0. Jones threw for 291 yards and four touchdowns, all of which went to DeVonta Smith. During the Iron Bowl against Auburn, Jones threw for 302 yards and five touchdowns. The following week, Jones threw for 385 yards and four touchdowns against LSU. With the victory, the Crimson Tide clinched a berth in the 2020 SEC Championship Game against Florida. There, Jones threw for 418 yards and five touchdowns, with Alabama winning 52–46. Alabama went 11–0 in a schedule featuring only in-conference opponents due to the COVID-19 pandemic.

==== Playoffs ====
Alabama was selected to take on Notre Dame in the 2021 Rose Bowl semifinal game, where Jones threw four touchdown passes en route to a 31–14 victory. Alabama would go on to win the 2021 College Football Playoff National Championship game against the Ohio State Buckeyes 52–24, with Jones throwing five touchdowns. He finished the season throwing for 4,500 yards with 41 touchdowns and four interceptions. His 203.1 passer rating and 77.4 completion percentage were both NCAA season records. Jones was named the recipient of the Davey O'Brien, Johnny Unitas Golden Arm, and Manning Awards. He finished third for the Heisman Trophy, which went to his teammate Smith. Having earned his master's degree in sports hospitality with a 4.00 GPA, Jones also received Academic All-American of the Year honors from the College Sports Information Directors of America in both Division I football and all Division I sports for the 2020–21 school year. Following the season, Jones announced that he would forgo his final year of eligibility and enter the 2021 NFL draft.

== Professional career ==
Pre-draft measurables
Height	Weight	Arm length	Hand span	Wingspan	40-yard dash	10-yard split	20-yard split	20-yard shuttle	Three-cone drill	Vertical jump	Broad jump
6 ft 2 5/8 in (1.90 m)	217 lb (98 kg)	32 5/8 in (0.83 m)	9 3/4 in (0.25 m)	6 ft 6 5/8 in (2.00 m)	4.82 s	1.70 s	2.76 s	4.39 s	7.04 s	32 in (0.81 m)	9 ft 8 in (2.95 m)
All values from Alabama's Pro Day

=== New England Patriots ===
==== 2021 ====
One of the top quarterback prospects of the 2021 NFL draft, Jones was projected to be taken in the first round. Although many analysts predicted that he would be selected third overall by the San Francisco 49ers, Jones was selected 15th overall by the New England Patriots after the 49ers drafted North Dakota State quarterback Trey Lance. He was the last of five quarterbacks and the fourth of six Alabama players taken in the first round. Jones was also the first quarterback drafted in the first round by the Patriots since Drew Bledsoe in 1993. On July 6, 2021, Jones signed his four-year rookie contract, worth $15.6 million fully guaranteed.

Following the preseason, Jones was named the Patriots' starter for 2021. He beat out incumbent starting quarterback Cam Newton, who was released during the final roster cuts. Jones became New England's first rookie quarterback to start a season opener since Bledsoe in 1993.

In his NFL debut, Jones completed 29-of-39 passes for 281 yards and his first NFL touchdown to wide receiver Nelson Agholor during a narrow 17–16 loss to the Miami Dolphins. Jones also set the NFL completion percentage record for a debuting rookie at 74.4. His first win came in Week 2 against the New York Jets, and Jones became the first rookie quarterback to convert over 70% of 60 passes in his first two starts by obtaining a 73.3 completion rate. Jones struggled the following week against the New Orleans Saints, in which he had three interceptions, including his career first to safety P. J. Williams.

During Week 4, Jones made his Sunday Night Football debut against defending Super Bowl LV champion Tampa Bay Buccaneers led by Super Bowl LV MVP and former Patriots quarterback Tom Brady. Although the Patriots narrowly lost 19–17, Jones had 19 consecutive completions, the most for an NFL rookie since 1991 and tying the franchise record set by Brady back in 2015. In the next game against the Houston Texans, Jones had his first fourth quarter comeback and game-winning drive when he helped the Patriots rally from a 22–9 deficit to win on the road 25–22. Two weeks later, Jones won his first home game during a 54–13 rout of the Jets, throwing for 307 yards and two touchdowns before being relieved by backup Brian Hoyer in the final minutes.

The Week 7 victory began a seven-game winning streak for the Patriots, with Jones completing 69.4% of his passes for 1,397 yards, nine touchdowns, and two interceptions. Jones also became the first NFL rookie quarterback to have a completion percentage of 80+ in consecutive games, which he obtained in victories over the Cleveland Browns and Atlanta Falcons. Amid the streak, Jones was named Offensive Rookie of the Month for November. In the seventh consecutive victory, he attempted only three passes against the Buffalo Bills due to heavy wind conditions, the second-fewest by a winning team since the Bills in 1974. New England's winning streak ended with consecutive losses against the Indianapolis Colts and Bills, which saw Jones record two interceptions in each game. After a Week 17 rout of the Jacksonville Jaguars, Jones became the first Patriots quarterback other than Brady to clinch a postseason berth since 1998. He also threw his 20th touchdown pass, which broke the franchise record for single-season touchdown passes made by a rookie set by Jim Plunkett in 1971.

Jones finished his rookie year with 3,801 passing yards, 22 touchdowns, and 13 interceptions to go along with 44 carries for 129 yards in 17 games and starts. His 22 touchdowns and 67.6 completion percentage, which were the highest among rookie quarterbacks in 2021. Jones was also the only rookie quarterback to lead a team to a winning record and playoff appearance. Jones became the first Patriots rookie quarterback to start a playoff game with his Wild Card Round appearance against the Bills, throwing for 232 yards, two touchdowns, and two interceptions in the 47–17 road loss.

For his performance as a rookie, Jones was named to the 2021 PFWA All-Rookie Team and finished second in Offensive Rookie of the Year voting behind Ja'Marr Chase. Jones was also selected as an alternate to the 2022 Pro Bowl, making him the fourth Patriots rookie and the franchise's first rookie quarterback to receive Pro Bowl honors. On the NFL Top 100 Players of 2022, Jones was ranked 85th by his fellow players.

==== 2022 ====
With the departure of offensive coordinator Josh McDaniels, Jones began the 2022 season under a new offense that had former defensive coordinator Matt Patricia as the play caller and former special teams coordinator Joe Judge as the quarterbacks coach. Jones struggled over the first three games, throwing a combined five interceptions to two touchdowns and winning only one of his starts. During a Week 3 37–26 loss to the Baltimore Ravens, in which he threw three interceptions, Jones suffered an ankle injury on his final pass. The injury was diagnosed as an ankle sprain that forced him to miss New England's next three matchups, during which the team went 2–1 under rookie Bailey Zappe.

Jones returned for the Week 7 Monday Night Football matchup with the Chicago Bears, but after going three-and-out on his first two drives and throwing an interception on his third, he was benched for Zappe in the 33–14 loss. Despite the benching, Jones started the following week against the Jets, completing 24-of-35 passes for 194 yards, a touchdown, and an interception in the 22–17 victory. He also had an interception returned for a touchdown by cornerback Michael Carter II, but a roughing the passer penalty on defensive end John Franklin-Myers negated the play. During a Week 9 26–3 victory over the Colts, Jones completed 20-of-30 passes for 147 yards and a touchdown, ending a seven-game interception streak. He had his strongest performance of the season on Thanksgiving against the Minnesota Vikings, throwing for a career-high 382 yards and two touchdowns in the 33–26 road loss. The Patriots would win only two more games to finish the season 8–9, with Jones throwing for 1,229 yards, eight touchdowns, and four interceptions in his last six appearances. Three of his interceptions occurred in the second half of the season finale loss to the Bills, which led to the Patriots' elimination from the playoffs.

Jones finished his second professional season with 2,997 passing yards, 14 touchdowns, and 11 interceptions, a noted regression from his rookie campaign, while also rushing 47 times for 102 yards and a touchdown.

==== 2023 ====
The 2023 season saw another change in offensive playcalling for Jones, with offensive coordinator Bill O'Brien returning to the Patriots.

During the season opener against the Philadelphia Eagles, Jones finished the 25–20 loss completing 35-of-54 passes for 316 yards, three touchdowns, and an interception. In the next game against the Dolphins, he completed 31-of-42 passes for 231 yards, a touchdown, and an interception during the 24–17 loss. The following week against the Jets, Jones threw for 201 yards in the 15–10 victory.

During Week 4 against the Dallas Cowboys, Jones was replaced by Zappe after posting a 39.9 rating with three turnovers in a 38–3 blowout road loss. In the next game against the Saints, Jones threw for 110 yards and two interceptions, including one that was returned for a touchdown, and lost a fumble. He was benched again for Zappe in the fourth quarter as the team lost 34–0. The following week against the Las Vegas Raiders, Jones completed 24-of-33 passes for 200 yards and an interception in the 21–17 road loss. Jones struggled during the three-game losing streak as he threw five interceptions and no touchdowns.

The Patriots snapped a three-game losing streak after Jones completed 25-of-30 passes for 272 yards and two touchdowns in a 29–25 comeback victory over the Bills. During Week 8 against the Dolphins, he completed 19-of-29 passes for 161 yards, two touchdowns, and an interception in the 31–17 loss. In the next game against the Washington Commanders, Jones went 24-of-44 passes for 220 yards, a touchdown, and a late game-losing interception during the 20–17 loss. The following week against the Colts in Frankfurt, Jones was sacked five times in the first half and completed 15-of-20 passes for 170 yards and an interception. Due to his performance, he was replaced by Zappe for the third time that season in the final drive as the Patriots lost 10–6. During Week 12, playing his final game as a Patriot against the New York Giants, Jones completed 12-of-21 passes for 89 yards and two interceptions before being replaced again by Zappe at halftime in the 10–7 loss. Jones was subsequently benched for the remainder of the season.

Jones finished the 2023 season with 2,120 passing yards, 10 touchdowns, and 12 interceptions to go along with 26 carries for 96 yards in 11 games and starts.

=== Jacksonville Jaguars ===
On March 14, 2024, Jones was traded to the Jacksonville Jaguars in exchange for a 2024 sixth-round pick (No. 193: Joe Milton). The Jaguars declined the fifth-year option on Jones' contract, making him a free agent after the 2024 season.

Following Trevor Lawrence's injury in Week 9, Jones was made the starter for Weeks 10 and 11, losing both starts. During Week 13 against the Houston Texans, Jones relieved Lawrence in the second quarter after the latter sustained a concussion, finishing with 235 passing yards and two touchdowns in the 23–20 loss. The following week, Lawrence was placed on injured reserve and Jones was named starter for the remainder of the season. The latter earned his first win as starter for the Jaguars in a 10–6 road victory against the Tennessee Titans.

Jones finished the 2024 season with 1,672 passing yards, eight touchdowns, and eight interceptions to go along with 28 carries for 92 yards and a touchdown in 10 games and seven starts.

=== San Francisco 49ers ===
==== 2025 ====
On March 14, 2025, Jones signed a two-year, $7 million contract with the San Francisco 49ers.

On September 12, after starting quarterback Brock Purdy was ruled out with shoulder and toe injuries, Jones was named the starter for the Week 2 matchup against the New Orleans Saints. Jones finished the 26–21 road victory completing 26-of-39 passes for 279 yards and three touchdowns. While Purdy was questionable, Jones was named the starter for the next game. The latter led the 49ers to a narrow 16–15 victory over the Arizona Cardinals, completing 27-of-41 passes for 284 yards, a touchdown, and an interception.

After Jones threw for 342 yards and two touchdowns in a Week 5 26–23 overtime road victory over the Los Angeles Rams on Thursday Night Football, voices within the 49ers organization started to call for Jones to be named the full time starter, replacing Purdy upon his recovery from his injuries, although Jones himself would dismiss the calls by saying: "[The 49ers] brought me here to play as a backup and that's my job." In the next game against the Buccaneers, Jones completed 27-of-39 passes for 347 yards and two interceptions during the 30–19 road loss. The following week against the Falcons on Sunday Night Football, he had 152 passing yards and an interception in the 20–10 victory.

During a Week 8 26–15 road loss to the Texans, Jones had 193 passing yards, two touchdowns, and an interception. In the next game against the Giants, he completed his first 14 passes and finished the 34–24 road victory completing 19-of-24 passes for 235 yards and two touchdowns. The following week against the Rams, Jones completed 33-of-39 passes for 319 yards, three touchdowns, and an interception during the 42–26 loss. Purdy returned from his injury in Week 11 and Jones played sparingly the rest of the season.

Jones finished the 2025 season with 2,151 passing yards, 13 touchdowns, and six interceptions to go along with 36 carries for 60 yards in 11 games and eight starts.

== Career statistics ==
Legend
**Bold**	Career high

=== NFL ===
==== Regular season ====
Year	Team	Games			Passing									Rushing					Sacks		Fumbles	
Year	Team	GP	GS	Record	Cmp	Att	Pct	Yds	Y/A	Lng	TD	Int	Rtg	Att	Yds	Y/A	Lng	TD	Sck	SckY	Fum	Lost
2021	NE	17	17	10–7	**352**	**521**	67.6	**3,801**	7.3	**75**	**22**	**13**	92.5	44	**129**	2.9	13	0	28	**241**	**7**	**3**
2022	NE	14	14	6–8	288	442	65.2	2,997	6.8	48	14	11	84.8	**47**	102	2.2	15	**1**	**34**	231	5	1
2023	NE	11	11	2–9	224	345	64.9	2,120	6.1	58	10	12	77.0	26	96	**3.7**	**18**	0	22	127	3	2
2024	JAX	10	7	2–5	171	262	65.3	1,672	6.4	62	8	8	80.5	28	92	3.3	13	**1**	14	100	2	2
2025	SF	11	8	**5–3**	201	289	**69.6**	2,151	**7.4**	56	13	6	**97.4**	36	60	1.7	13	0	16	108	4	1
2026	SF	2	0	—	0	0	0.0	0	0.0	0	0	0	0.0	5	-5	-1.0	-1	0	0	0	0	0
Career		64	57	25–32	1,236	1,859	66.5	12,741	6.9	75	67	50	86.9	186	474	2.5	18	2	114	807	21	9

==== Postseason ====
Year	Team	Games			Passing									Rushing					Sacks		Fumbles	
Year	Team	GP	GS	Record	Cmp	Att	Pct	Yds	Y/A	Lng	TD	Int	Rtg	Att	Yds	Y/A	Lng	TD	Sck	SckY	Fum	Lost
2021	NE	1	1	0–1	**24**	**38**	**63.2**	**232**	**6.1**	**43**	**2**	**2**	**75.8**	**2**	**18**	**9.0**	**16**	0	**3**	**16**	0	0
2025	SF	1	0	—	2	4	50.0	4	5.6	3	0	0	56.2	1	7	7.0	7	0	0	0	0	0
Career		2	1	0–1	26	42	61.9	236	5.6	43	2	2	73.1	3	25	8.3	16	0	3	16	0	0

=== College ===
Legend
Won the CFP National Championship
NCAA record
Led the NCAA

Year	Team	Games			Passing								Rushing			
Year	Team	GP	GS	Record	Cmp	Att	Pct	Yds	Y/A	TD	Int	Rtg	Att	Yds	Avg	TD
2017	Alabama	0	0	—	Redshirted (redshirt)											
2018	Alabama	14	0	—	5	13	38.5	123	9.5	1	0	143.3	3	−8	−2.7	0
2019	Alabama	12	4	3−1	97	141	68.8	1,503	10.7	14	3	186.8	16	**36**	**2.3**	**1**
2020	Alabama	13	13	**13−0**	**311**	**402**	**77.4**	**4,500**	**11.2**	**41**	**4**	**203.1**	**35**	14	0.4	**1**
Career		39	17	16−1	413	556	74.3	6,126	11.0	56	7	197.6	54	42	0.8	2

== Personal life ==
Jones was nicknamed "the Joker" in college for his habit of laughing with his mouth open and having some fun in the locker room with his teammates.

In August 2021, Jones signed an endorsement deal with NoBull, a Boston-based company that makes athletic shoes and apparel.
