= 2021 Tampa Bay Buccaneers–New England Patriots game =

2021 professional American football game

The Return: 2021 Tampa Bay Buccaneers–New England Patriots game
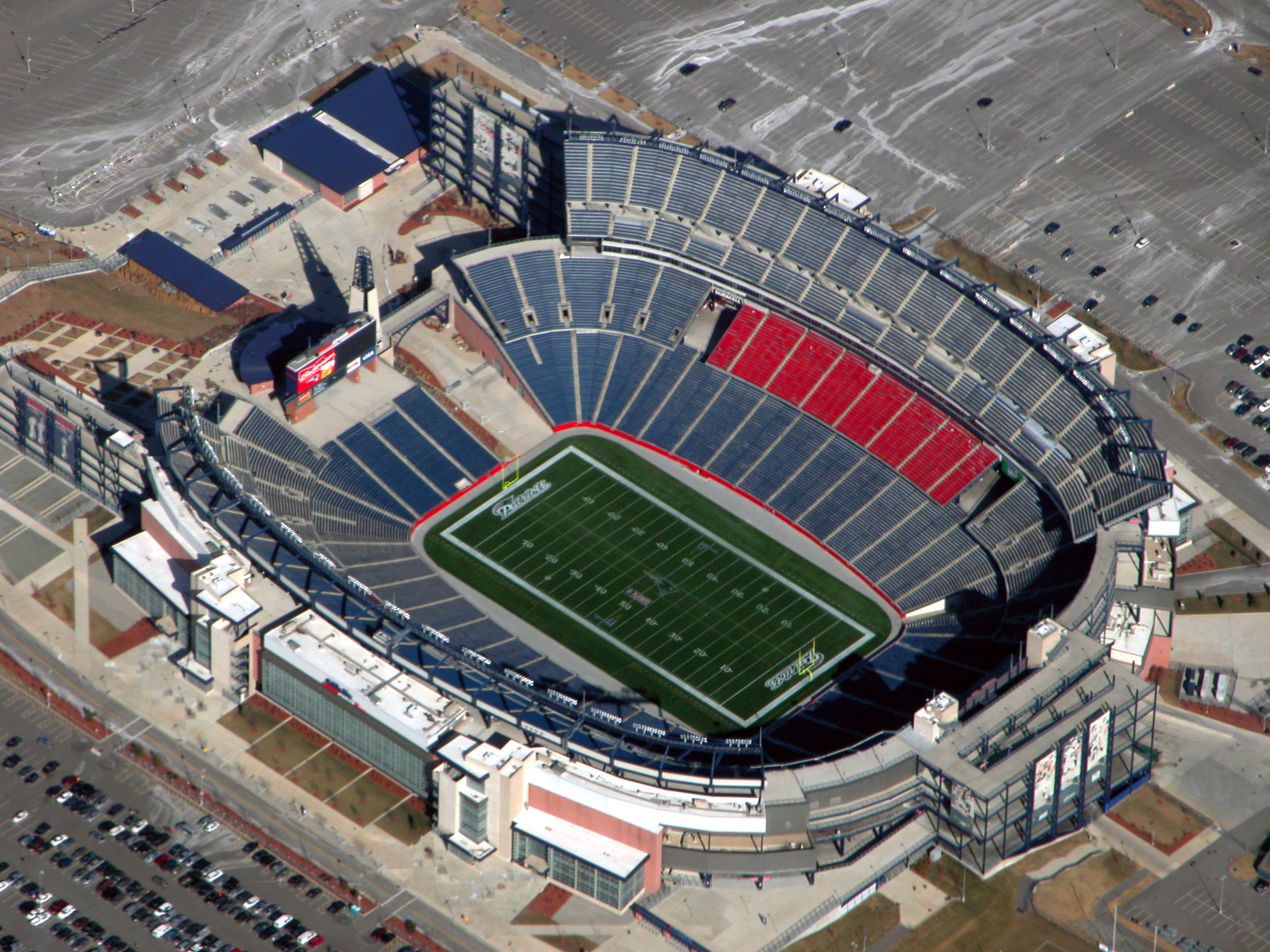
- The game was played at Gillette Stadium in Foxborough, Massachusetts.
Tampa Bay Buccaneers (2–1)	New England Patriots (1–2)
19	17
Head coach: Bruce Arians	Head coach: Bill Belichick
	1	2	3	4	Total
TB	3	3	7	6	19
NE	0	7	0	10	17
- Date: October 3, 2021
- Stadium: Gillette Stadium; Foxborough, Massachusetts
- Favorite: Tampa Bay by 6.5
- Referee: Bill Vinovich
- Attendance: 65,878

TV in the United States
- Network: NBC
- Announcers: Al Michaels, Cris Collinsworth, Michele Tafoya, and Terry McAulay

Radio in the United States
- Announcers: Bob Socci and Scott Zolak/Gene Deckerhoff, Dave Moore, and T.J. Rives/Carlos Bohorquez and Martin Gramatica/Carlos Mauricio Ramirez and Jorge Andres/Edgar Lopez and Rene Giraldo

On October 3, 2021, during Week 4 of the 2021 NFL season, the defending Super Bowl LV champion Tampa Bay Buccaneers defeated the hosting New England Patriots by a score of 19–17 on NBC Sunday Night Football. The game was highly anticipated as Buccaneers quarterback Tom Brady played his first game at Gillette Stadium in Foxborough, Massachusetts, against his former team, his long-time former head coach Bill Belichick, and Patriots owner Robert Kraft. Brady had previously spent 20 seasons with the Patriots between 2000 and 2019, leading the franchise to a league-tying record of six championships. NBC Sports marketed the game with the tagline "The Return" in promotional material.

In the rainy evening game where the Buccaneers were favored to win, Brady threw for 269 yards and no touchdowns, passing Drew Brees as the NFL all-time career passing yards leader in the process. Brady's efforts helped lead the Buccaneers to a comeback victory and improve their season record to 3–1. The Patriots fanbase warmly welcomed Brady back to Gillette Stadium before the game, but quickly turned their attention to rookie quarterback Mac Jones. Throwing for 275 yards and two touchdown passes, Jones nearly led the Patriots to an upset victory. In a back-and-forth game where four lead changes occurred in the fourth quarter alone, it would be the Patriots' turnovers, lack of a rushing attack, and ultimately a missed field goal that cost them a chance to win. The Patriots' season record lowered to 1–3 as a result.

The game was highly marketed and went on to become the second most-watched broadcast of NBC Sunday Night Football in its history.

== Background ==
From 2000 to 2019, head coach Bill Belichick and quarterback Tom Brady had led the New England Patriots to one of the most successful tenures for any team in NFL history, winning six Super Bowls together in that timespan. On March 17, 2020, the day before what would become his final contract with the Patriots expired, Brady announced that he would not re-sign with the team for the 2020 season, ending his 20-year tenure in New England.

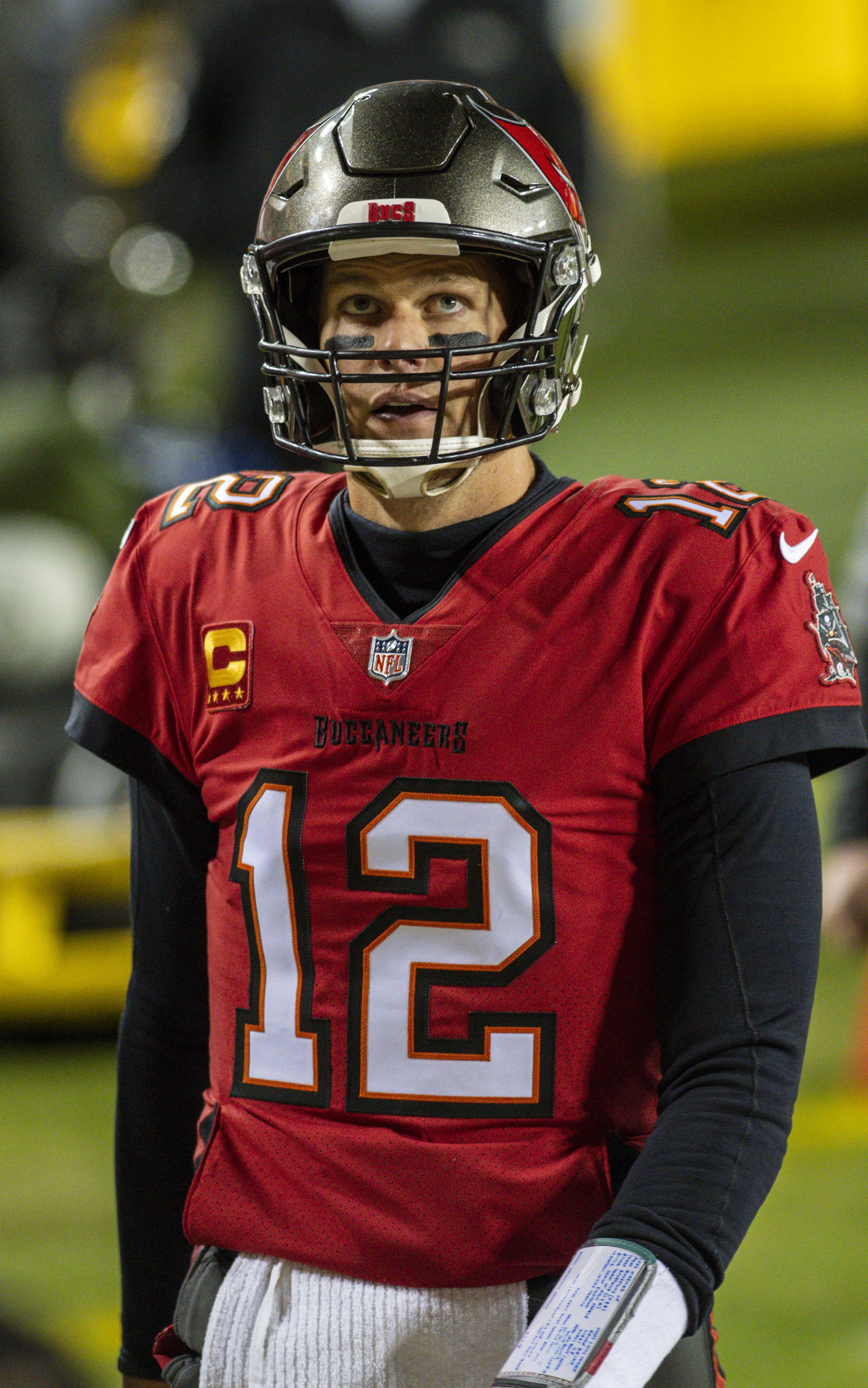
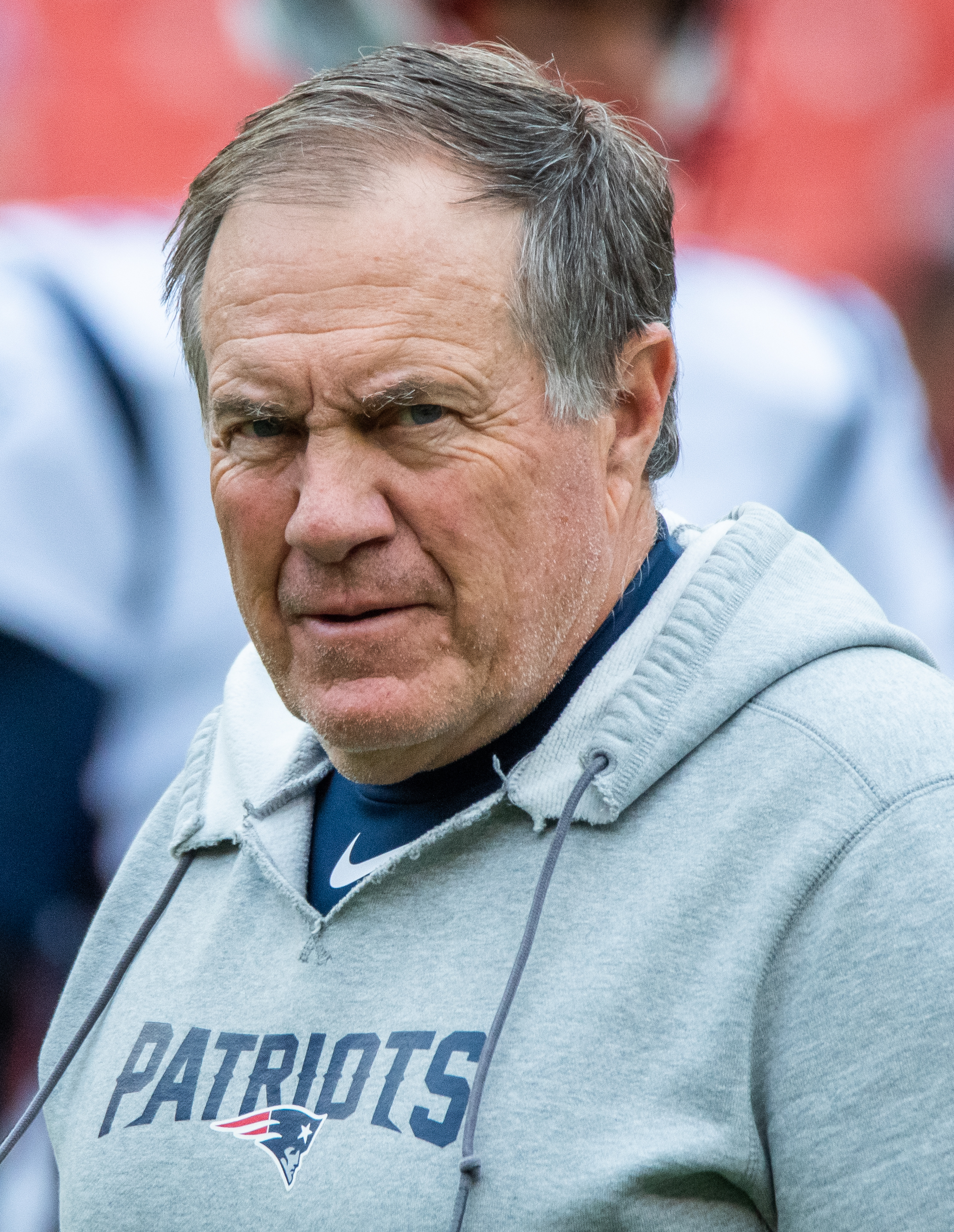
The anticipated matchup set Tampa Bay Buccaneers quarterback Tom Brady (left) against his former team and his coach of 20 years, Bill Belichick (right) and the New England Patriots.

He then signed with the Tampa Bay Buccaneers, proceeding to lead them to a wild-card berth in the playoffs, their first playoff appearance since 2007, and ultimately to win Super Bowl LV, their first championship win since 2002. This also became Brady's 7th championship win, the most by a single player in NFL history. With the win, Brady became the oldest quarterback in Super Bowl history to start, play, win, and earn the Super Bowl MVP award, his fifth overall.

The Patriots, however, struggled without Brady in 2020, suffering their first losing season since 2000 and missing the playoffs for the first time since 2008, with former Carolina Panthers quarterback Cam Newton playing as the starter that year. The Patriots selected Mac Jones from Alabama in the first round of the 2021 NFL draft. Jones beat out Newton during the offseason for the starting position, resulting in the latter's release.

Tampa Bay entered the matchup at 2–1 and were 7-point favorites to win against New England, who entered at 1–2. Prior to the game, NBC Sports released a promotional video set to Adele's "Hello" featuring a montage of Brady in his Patriots and Buccaneers tenures with the tagline "The Return". Much anticipation was also put into Brady potentially passing Drew Brees for the most career passing yards in NFL history and professional gridiron football history. Coming into the game, Brady had thrown for 80,291 yards in his career, and needed only 68 more to pass Brees, who retired the year before with a career total of 80,358 yards thrown.

In the week leading up to the matchup, both Brady and Belichick spoke fondly of their time with one another in the press, with Brady calling Belichick a "great mentor" and Belichick calling Brady a "special player". However, both said they were more focused on preparing for the game rather than reminiscing about the past.

== Game summary ==
=== Pre-game ===
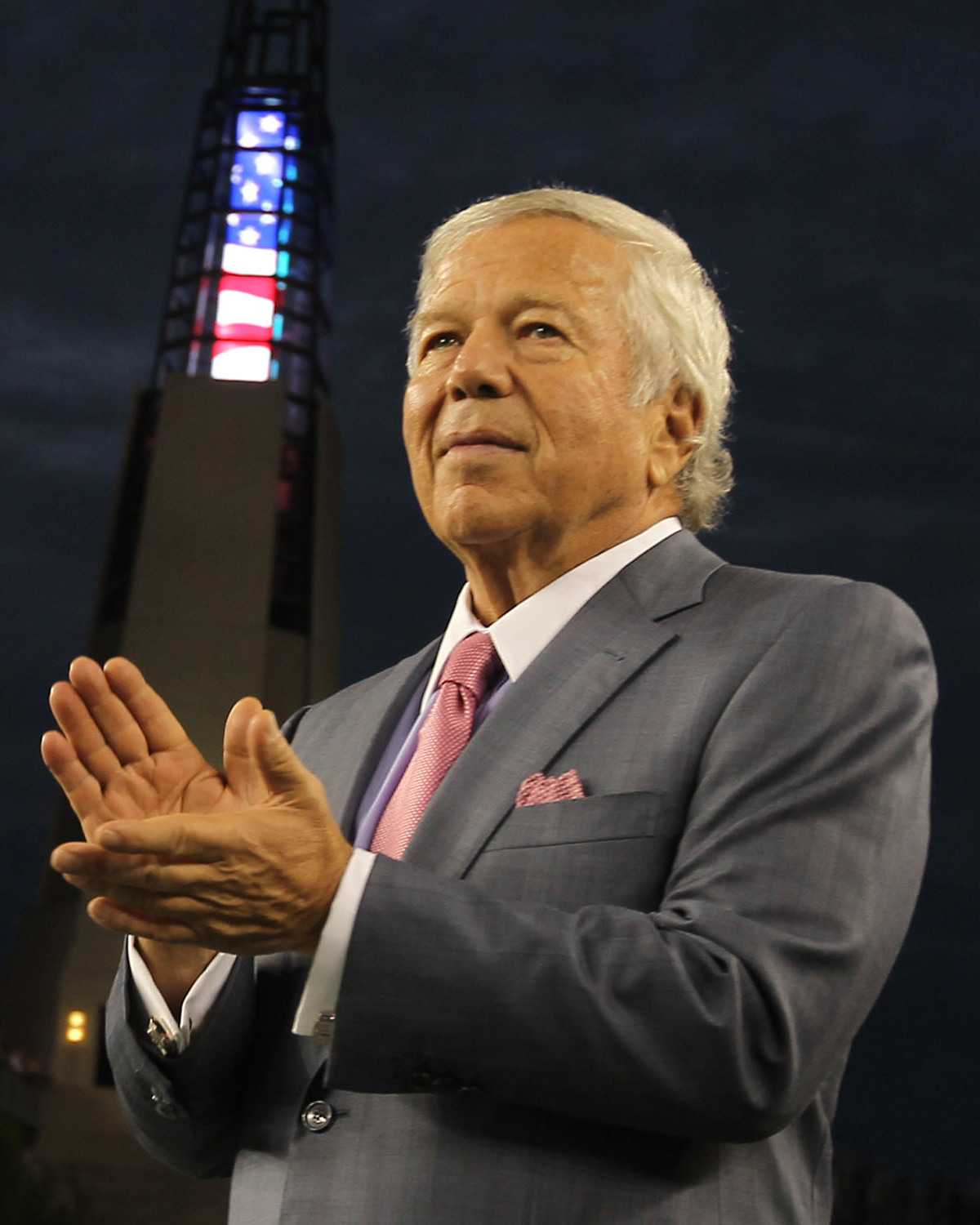
Patriots owner Robert Kraft greeted Brady warmly before the game.

Hours prior to the game, Patriots owner Robert Kraft greeted Brady outside the visitors' locker room and the two exchanged warm words. Brady received a standing ovation at Gillette Stadium when he took the field for warmups, with Patriots fans chanting his name. The stadium's video screens showed a tribute video shortly before kickoff highlighting Brady's accomplishments during his 20-year tenure with the team.

=== First quarter ===
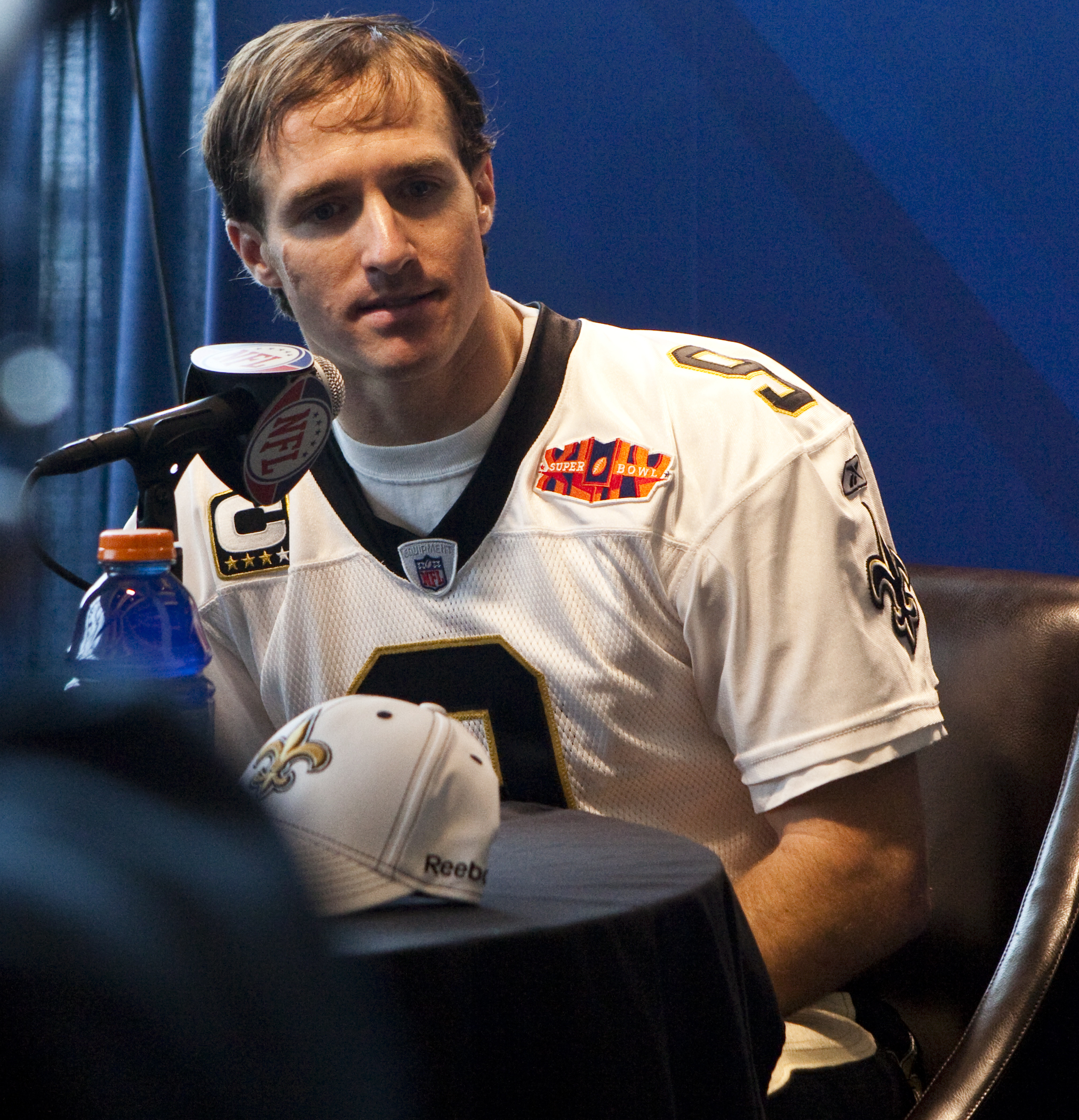
In the first quarter, Brady would pass quarterback Drew Brees for most career passing yards by an NFL player.

New England received the ball first, and their first drive ended with a punt. While the Patriots fans gave quarterback Tom Brady a warm reception prior to the game, the cheers turned to boos when he took the field with the Buccaneers offense, as he was now on the opposing team. Brady threw for 14 yards on the drive, inching him closer to Drew Brees' record for most career passing yards in NFL history, but the drive ended with the punt. The next Patriots possession resulted in a three-and-out, returning the ball to the Buccaneers.

Later in the ensuing Tampa Bay drive, Brady completed a 28-yard completion on a crossing route to wide receiver Mike Evans to New England's 14-yard line. With the pass, he officially surpassed Brees' career passing yardage total. As Brees was on the sideline for the game as part of the Sunday Night Football broadcast team, he witnessed Brady overtaking his record in person and applauded the accomplishment. A brief moment of acknowledgement was displayed on the video screens, but no additional stoppage of play occurred. The drive resulted in placekicker Ryan Succop scoring a field goal to give Tampa Bay an early 3–0 lead with 4:49 left in the first quarter. On the next Patriots drive, quarterback Mac Jones was intercepted by safety Antoine Winfield Jr., allowing Brady to lead Tampa Bay down the field again.

=== Second quarter ===
By the start of the second quarter, Brady led the team to the New England's 18-yard line. Due to a rib injury suffered the previous week by tight end Rob Gronkowski, who also played for the Patriots from 2010 to 2018, Tampa Bay struggled to score in the red zone. Succop then missed a field goal attempt that would have doubled the Buccaneers' lead.

Jones then led the Patriots on a 11-play, 74-yard drive which ended on an 11-yard touchdown pass to tight end Hunter Henry, giving the team a 7–3 lead. After trading punts, Brady drove Tampa Bay to the New England 26-yard line right before halftime. Dropped passes due to the wet conditions stalled the drive, and Succop kicked a 44-yard field goal with 18 seconds left. The Patriots then ran out the clock to finish the first half. The Buccaneers offense outgained the Patriots 227 yards to 129 in the first two quarters, but the score was 7–6 at halftime with the Patriots leading.

=== Third quarter ===
Tampa Bay received the second half kickoff, but went three-and-out. The Patriots took over near midfield, but three plays into the drive, running back J. J. Taylor fumbled at the Tampa Bay 28-yard line which was recovered by the Buccaneers. Though they failed to score any points, they were able to punt and pin New England deep in their own territory. On the ensuring drive, with excellent field position, Tampa Bay took a 13–7 lead with a 8-yard touchdown run by running back Ronald Jones.

Mac Jones drove the Patriots down the field swiftly and eventually achieved 19 consecutive pass completions in the process, becoming the first rookie quarterback in 40 years to achieve such a feat and tying Brady's personal best with the team.

=== Fourth quarter ===
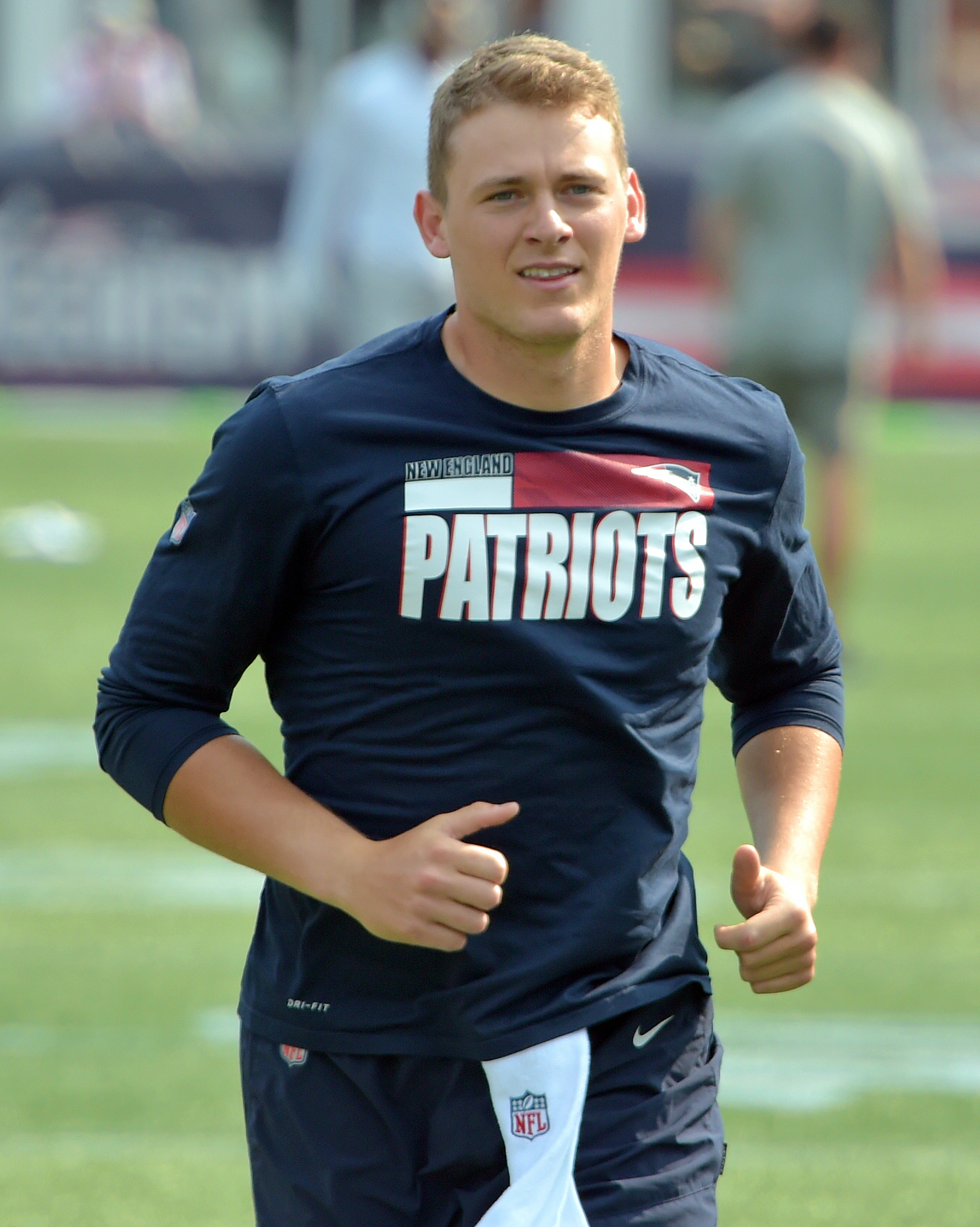
Mac Jones, the Patriots' rookie starting quarterback, would attempt a game-winning drive.

Mac Jones threw a 1-yard touchdown pass to tight end Jonnu Smith on the first play of the fourth quarter, returning the lead to the Patriots 14–13. With running backs Leonard Fournette and Ronald Jones the leading rushers on the night, Tampa Bay's more balanced offense again drove into the red zone, but had to again settle for a field goal. With under 8 minutes left in regulation, Succop kicked another field goal to give Tampa Bay the lead at 16–14.

Wide receiver Jakobi Meyers caught a 21-yard reception, then executed a double reverse pass to receiver Nelson Agholor, setting the Patriots up at the Tampa Bay 8-yard line. The Buccaneers defense stiffened, and the Patriots had to settle for a field goal, and a 17–16 lead. Tampa Bay took over with 4:34 remaining in regulation. A pass interference penalty on the Patriots advanced Tampa Bay to the New England 44-yard line. The drive stalled at the 30-yard line, and Succop kicked the go-ahead field goal as the game hit the two-minute warning.

Trailing 19–17, Mac Jones drove the Patriots into Tampa Bay territory, aided by a pass interference call on safety Jordan Whitehead. With heavy rain now falling, New England faced a 3rd & 3 at the Tampa Bay 37. Mac Jones' pass was batted down at the line of scrimmage by linebacker Lavonte David, bringing up fourth down. With 59 seconds left in regulation, in a driving rain, New England placekicker Nick Folk's 56-yard field attempt hit the left upright and fell no good. Tampa Bay ran out the clock, and beat the Patriots for the first time since 2000.

=== Statistics ===
2021 Week 4: Tampa Bay Buccaneers at New England Patriots – Game summary

Quarter	1	2	3	4	Total
Buccaneers	3	3	7	6	19
Patriots	0	7	0	10	17

at Gillette Stadium, Foxborough, Massachusetts

- Date: October 3
- Game time: 8:20 p.m. EDT
- Game weather: Rain, 61 °F (16 °C)
- Game attendance: 65,878
- Referee: Bill Vinovich
- TV announcers (NBC): Al Michaels, Cris Collinsworth, Michele Tafoya and Terry McAulay
- Recap, Gamebook

Game information

First quarter

- TB – Ryan Succop 45-yard field goal, 4:49. Buccaneers 3–0. Drive: 10 plays, 71 yards, 3:53.

Second quarter

- NE – Hunter Henry 11-yard pass from Mac Jones (Nick Folk kick), 8:28. Patriots 7–3. Drive: 11 plays, 74 yards, 6:21.
- TB – Ryan Succop 44-yard field goal, 0:13. Patriots 7–6. Drive: 8 plays, 69 yards, 1:36.

Third quarter

- TB – Ronald Jones II 8-yard run (Ryan Succop kick), 3:29. Buccaneers 13–7. Drive: 8 plays, 52 yards, 3:48.

Fourth quarter

- NE – Jonnu Smith 1-yard pass from Mac Jones (Nick Folk kick), 14:57. Patriots 14–13. Drive: 7 plays, 77 yards, 3:32.
- TB – Ryan Succop 27-yard field goal, 7:58. Buccaneers 16–14. Drive: 15 plays, 68 yards, 6:59.
- NE – Nick Folk 27-yard field goal, 4:34. Patriots 17–16. Drive: 8 plays, 66 yards, 3:24.
- TB – Ryan Succop 48-yard field goal, 1:57. Buccaneers 19–17. Drive: 7 plays, 45 yards, 2:37.

Top passers

- TB – Tom Brady – 22/43, 269 yards
- NE – Mac Jones – 31/40, 275 yards, 2 TD, INT

Top rushers

- TB – Leonard Fournette – 20 rushes, 91 yards
- NE – Nelson Agholor – 1 rush, 4 yards

Top receivers

- TB – Mike Evans – 7 receptions, 75 yards
- NE – Jakobi Meyers – 8 receptions, 70 yards

== Aftermath ==
Immediately after the game, Brady and Belichick shared a quick embrace on the field before Brady greeted his former teammates and other members of the Patriots organization. Though fans criticized Belichick for his lack of warmth displayed towards his former quarterback, the two privately spoke at length in the Buccaneers locker room following the game.

With the victory over his former team, Brady became the fourth quarterback in NFL history to record a win against all 32 current teams in the league, joining Brett Favre, Peyton Manning, and Drew Brees. In addition, he became the sixth quarterback to have a victory against every incumbent NFL franchise after Fran Tarkenton and Joe Montana, as the league only had 28 teams during the latter two's respective tenures.

Drawing in 28.5 million viewers nationwide, Brady's return to New England became the second most-watched Sunday Night Football game on NBC after the Dallas–Washington 2012 season finale to clinch the NFC East. The broadcast also scored a 43.8 rating and 70 share in Boston, making it the city's second-biggest audience for a regular season Patriots game after New England clinched their undefeated season against the New York Giants in 2007.

Both teams qualified for the playoffs following this season. New England finished the season 10–7, good for second in the AFC East and the conference's #6 seed. However, they lost to Buffalo, 47–17, in the Wild Card Round, ending their season. Tampa Bay finished 13–4 to clinch the NFC South title and the conference's #2 seed. Tampa Bay defeated Philadelphia, 31–15 in the Wild Card round for Brady's 35th, and ultimately final, playoff win, extending his record. In the Divisional Round, they lost to the eventual Super Bowl LVI champion Los Angeles Rams by a score of 30–27.

On February 1, 2023, Brady would officially retire after 23 seasons in the NFL, while Belichick parted ways with the Patriots on January 11, 2024 after 24 seasons as their head coach.

== Starting lineups ==
Tampa Bay	Position		New England
OFFENSE
Chris Godwin	WR		Nelson Agholor
Mike Evans	WR		Jakobi Meyers
Josh Wells	T	WR	Kendrick Bourne
Donovan Smith	LT		Isaiah Wynn
Ali Marpet	LG		Michael Onwenu
Ryan Jensen	C		David Andrews
Alex Cappa	RG		Shaq Mason
Tristan Wirfs	RT		Justin Herron
Cameron Brate	TE		Hunter Henry
Tom Brady	QB		Mac Jones
Leonard Fournette	RB		Damien Harris
DEFENSE
Ndamukong Suh	DL	LE	Deatrich Wise Jr.
Vita Vea	NT	DL	Davon Godchaux
Joe Tryon-Shoyinka	OLB	DL	Lawrence Guy
Devin White	ILB	LB	Matthew Judon
Lavonte David	ILB	LB	Dont'a Hightower
Shaquil Barrett	OLB	LB	Kyle Van Noy
Carlton Davis	CB	DB	Kyle Dugger
Richard Sherman	CB	LCB	J. C. Jackson
Ross Cockrell	CB	RCB	Jalen Mills
Antoine Winfield Jr.	S		Adrian Phillips
Jordan Whitehead	S		Devin McCourty
Source: Gamebook

== Officials ==
- Referee: Bill Vinovich #52
- Line judge: Mark Perlman #9
- Down judge: Patrick Holt #106
- Side judge: Jimmy Buchanan #86
- Umpire: Tony Michalek #115
- Field judge: Joe Blubaugh #57
- Back judge: Jimmy Russell #82
- Replay official: Mark Butterworth #0
