= Nick Folk =

American football player (born 1984)

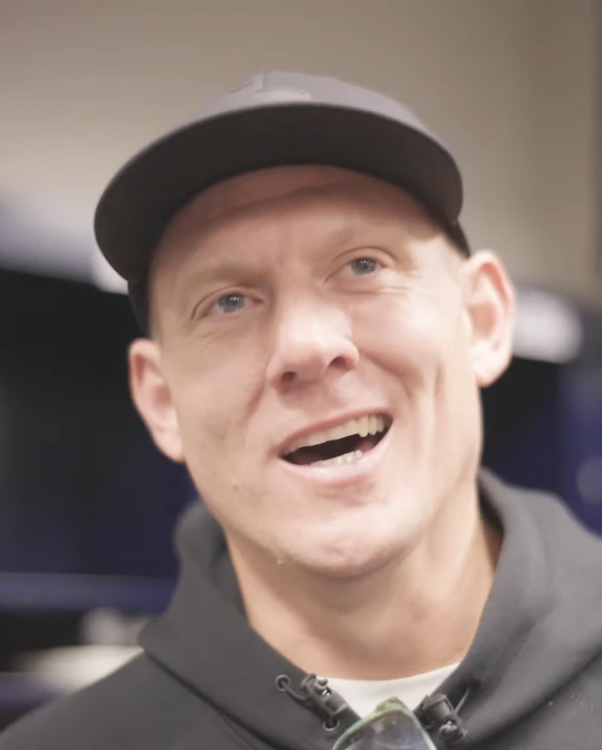
- Folk with the Tennessee Titans in 2024

Profile
- Position: Placekicker

Personal information
- Born: November 5, 1984 (age 42); Los Angeles, California, U.S.
- Listed height: 6 ft 1 in (1.85 m)
- Listed weight: 225 lb (102 kg)

Career information
- High school: Notre Dame (Sherman Oaks, California)
- College: Arizona (2003–2006)
- NFL draft: 2007: 6th round, 178th overall pick

Career history
- Dallas Cowboys (2007–2009); New York Jets (2010–2016); Tampa Bay Buccaneers (2017); Arizona Hotshots (2019); New England Patriots (2019–2022); Tennessee Titans (2023–2024); New York Jets (2025); Atlanta Falcons (2026)

Awards and highlights
- Pro Bowl (2007); NFL scoring co-leader (2021); PFWA All-Rookie Team (2007); First-team All-Pac-10 (2006)

Career NFL statistics as of Week 9, 2026
- Field goals made: 444
- Field goals attempted: 525
- Field goal %: 84.6%
- Extra points made: 550
- Extra points attempted: 568
- Extra point %: 96.8%
- Points: 1,882
- Longest field goal: 58
- Touchbacks: 237
- Stats at Pro Football Reference

Nicholas Alexander Folk (born November 5, 1984) is an American professional football placekicker. He played college football for the Arizona Wildcats, earning first-team All-Pac-10 in 2006. He was selected by the Dallas Cowboys of the National Football League (NFL) in the sixth round of the 2007 NFL draft. During his three seasons with the Cowboys, Folk received Pro Bowl honors as a rookie. Folk played his next seven seasons for the New York Jets, becoming the franchise's second-leading all-time scorer.

Following an unsuccessful stint on the Tampa Bay Buccaneers in 2017, Folk spent a year away from football before pursuing a comeback two years later with the Arizona Hotshots of the Alliance of American Football (AAF). He returned to the NFL later that year as a member of the New England Patriots and co-led the league in scoring in 2021. After four seasons in New England, Folk spent two seasons with the Tennessee Titans before rejoining the Jets in 2025. He joined the Falcons the following year. Folk is 10th on the all-time NFL field goals made list with 440, which is the highest among active NFL players.

== Early life ==
Folk was born and raised in Los Angeles, California. He played high school football at Notre Dame High School, Sherman Oaks, California, where as a senior, he was named "All-CIF" as a punter and second-team as a placekicker. Folk was also captain of the soccer team and earned All-CIF Division, all-league, and All-Valley honors.

== College career ==
Folk accepted a football scholarship from the University of Arizona. He became the starter as a sophomore. The longest field goal of his college career, a 52-yarder, came in 2005 against USC. During his sophomore year, he also took over the punting duties in addition to his kicking duties.

He earned All-Pac-10 honors as a senior. He finished his college career after making 30-of-47 field goals, 79-of-81 extra points, and 96 punts for 4,242 yards (44.2 avg.), including a long of 61 yards.

== Professional career ==
Pre-draft measurables
Height	Weight	Arm length	Hand span	Bench press
6 ft 1 3/8 in (1.86 m)	225 lb (102 kg)	30 7/8 in (0.78 m)	9 1/8 in (0.23 m)	14 reps
All values from NFL Combine/Pro Day

=== Dallas Cowboys ===
Folk (center) with the Dallas Cowboys in 2009

==== 2007 season ====
Folk was selected by the Dallas Cowboys in the sixth round (178th overall) of the 2007 NFL draft. Folk made the longest kick of his career to that point, a 53-yard game winner against the Buffalo Bills on Monday Night Football during his rookie season. He was named NFC Special Teams Player of the Week for Week 5. That season, he became the first Cowboys rookie Pro Bowl kicker, after being selected to serve as the NFC's kicker during the 2008 Pro Bowl, having gone 26-of-31 in field goal attempts and making all 53 extra points he attempted during the season. Folk also broke the Cowboys single-season record for most points by a placekicker (131) during his rookie season.

==== 2008 season ====
In 2008, Folk continued his strong performance. He made 91% of his kicks and once again made all 42 of his extra point attempts. Following the 2008 season, Folk discovered a problem with his hip that the Cowboys medical personnel diagnosed in his flexor, but it did not heal with the prescribed treatment. After conducting more tests, it was discovered that Folk had a torn labrum and underwent surgery in May 2009. The normal recovery period would have had Folk returning near the beginning of training camp but Folk rushed his rehab and as a result, the hip did not heal properly.

==== 2009 season ====
Folk struggled as he entered his third season with the Cowboys in 2009. His performance was erratic, evidenced by the fact that he only made 64.3% of his field goals, converting 18 out of 28 opportunities. On December 19, 2009, Folk attempted a 23-yard field goal against the New Orleans Saints that would have increased the Cowboys lead to ten points; earlier in the game, he had successfully kicked a 51-yard field goal. However, he missed as the ball hit the goalpost. Although the Cowboys won the game, the team lost faith in Folk and he was waived on December 21, and was replaced by Shaun Suisham.

=== New York Jets (first stint) ===
==== 2010 season ====
On February 23, Folk signed a one-year contract with the New York Jets. Head coach Rex Ryan mocked Folk's early performances during the team's offseason workouts; however, after working out with special teams coordinator Mike Westhoff, who helped refine Folk's kicking technique after allowing his hip to fully recover, Folk began to gain consistency once again.

On October 11, Folk became the first Jets kicker to kick five field goals in a home game since Pat Leahy achieved the feat in 1984. Folk set a franchise record for the longest kick, making a career long kick of 56 yards against the Denver Broncos on October 17.

During the 2010 season, Folk converted 30 field goals out of 39 opportunities. During the AFC Wild Card Round against the Indianapolis Colts on January 8, 2011, Folk kicked the game-winning field goal with only three seconds remaining in the 4th quarter, helping the team make their second straight AFC Championship where they would end up losing to the Pittsburgh Steelers.

==== 2011 season ====
During Week 1 on September 11, 2011, Folk kicked a 50-yard field goal with 27 seconds left to give the Jets a 27–24 victory over his former team, the Dallas Cowboys. During the 2011 season, Folk converted 19 field goals out of 25 opportunities.

==== 2012 season ====
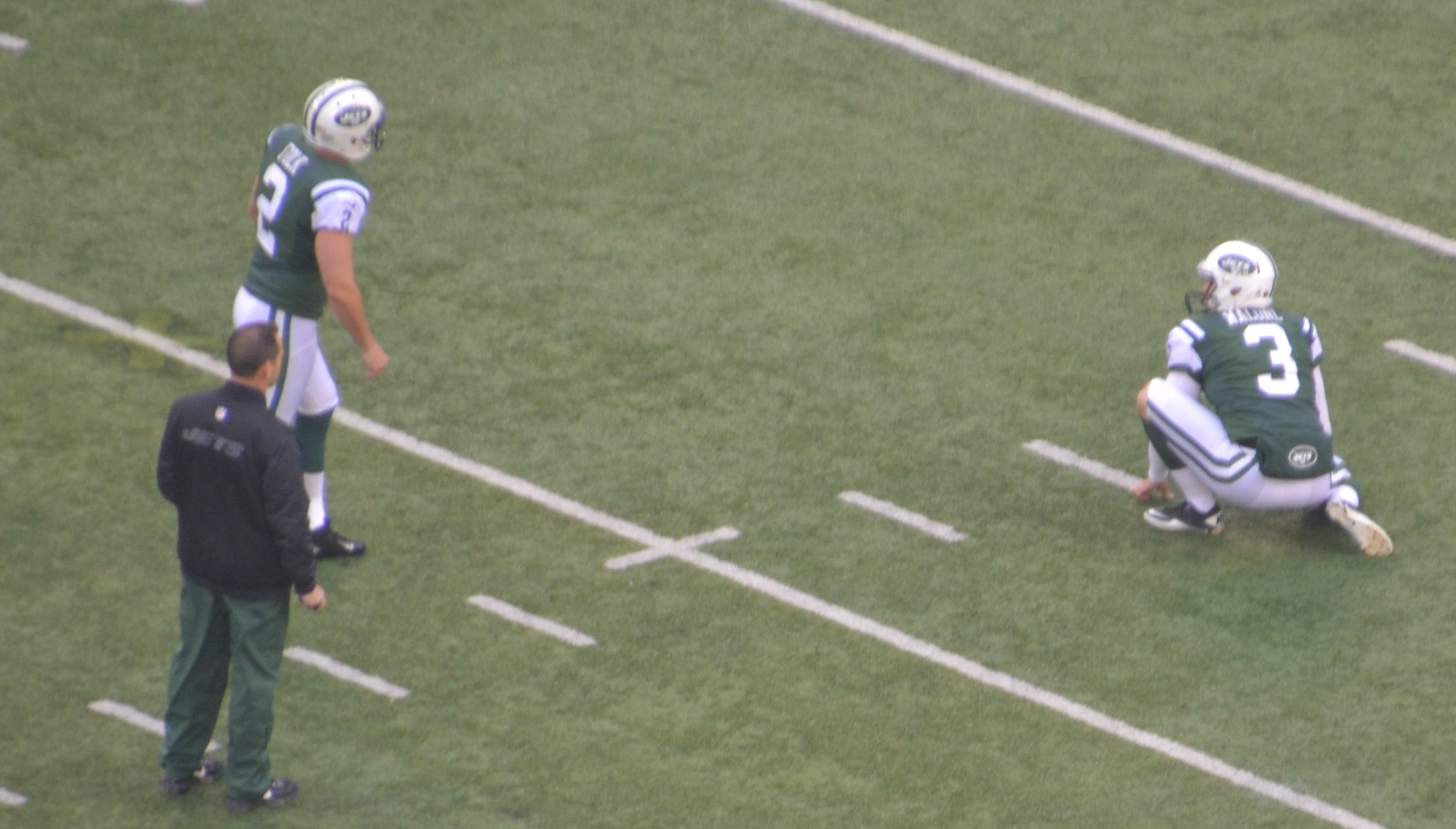
Folk (left) playing for the New York Jets in 2012.

On March 14, Folk was re-signed by the Jets. During the 2012 season, Folk converted 21 field goals in 27 opportunities.

==== 2013 season ====
In the preseason, Folk beat out Billy Cundiff for the Jets' starting kicker role. In the first game of the season, with 7 seconds left in the game, Folk successfully kicked a field goal from 48 yards to give the Jets an 18–17 win over the Tampa Bay Buccaneers. In Week 5, Folk kicked the game-winning field goal as time expired in a 30–28 win at the Atlanta Falcons. During an AFC East rivalry game against the New England Patriots in Week 7, Folk kicked another gaming-winning field goal to give the Jets a 30–27 overtime victory.

Folk's career-high and Jets record of 23 consecutive field goals made was snapped after missing from 48 yards during a 37–14 loss against the Bills. He established a franchise record in field goal percentage (91.7), after making 33-of-36 field goal attempts and his 23 consecutive field goals also ranked second in Jets history.

==== 2014 season ====
Set to become a free agent during the 2014 offseason, it was announced on February 28, 2014, that the Jets had placed the franchise tag on Folk. On March 10, it was announced that Folk had signed a 4-year, $12 million contract. He led the league in field goal attempts (39), tied for third in field goals made (32), and set a franchise record for the longest field goal made at home (55 yards).

==== 2015 season ====
In pregame warm-ups against the Jacksonville Jaguars, he suffered a season-ending quad injury. On November 10, 2015, Folk was placed on the team's injured reserve. In eight games, he finished the year making 13 field goals out of 16 opportunities. He also made all 19 extra point attempts.

==== 2016 season ====
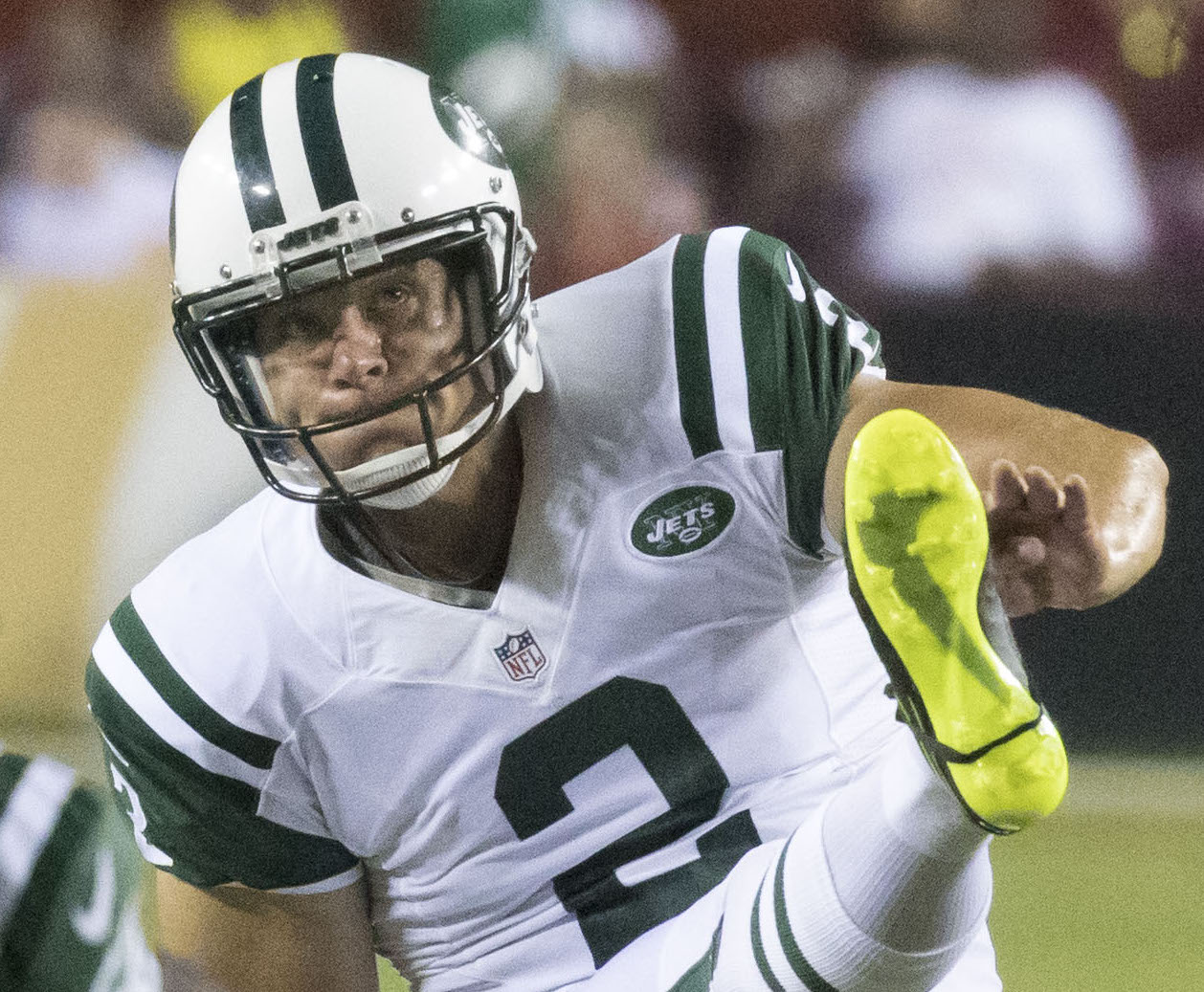
Folk in 2016

Returning from a quad injury, Folk played all 16 games in the 2016 season, making 27 field goals out of 31 opportunities. He also made 24 extra points out of 26 opportunities.

On February 23, 2017, he was released in a salary cap move. He ranks second on the franchise's all-time list in points scored (729), second in field goals made (175), and first in field goal percentage (81.3).

=== Tampa Bay Buccaneers ===
On March 17, 2017, Folk was signed as a free agent by the Tampa Bay Buccaneers, to compete with the previous year's second-round draft choice Roberto Aguayo. On August 12 the Buccaneers released Aguayo after missing two kicks in a preseason game. The Buccaneers then signed Zach Hocker to compete with Folk for the starting kicking job. On September 1, the Buccaneers released Hocker giving Folk the starting job. In Week 5, he missed three field goals, at 56, 49, and 31 yards, in a 19–14 loss to the New England Patriots. On October 9, 2017, he was placed on injured reserve with a "minor injury" classification. By rule, following his removal from the team's injured reserve, he was required to be released to free agency. On February 22, 2018, Folk was released from the Buccaneers.

=== Arizona Hotshots ===
On January 25, 2019, Folk attended a tryout with the Chicago Bears, but was not offered a contract. The next day, he signed with the Arizona Hotshots of the Alliance of American Football. Folk was the record-holder for the longest field goal in AAF history goal at 55 yards. The league ceased operations in April 2019.

=== New England Patriots ===
==== 2019 season ====
On October 29, 2019, following the release of Mike Nugent, Folk was signed by the New England Patriots. On November 28, 2019, it was revealed that Folk had undergone an appendectomy and was ruled out for at least a week. He was released the following day, after the team signed Kai Forbath. On December 6, 2019, Folk was re-signed by the Patriots. In the 2019 season, Folk converted all 12 extra point attempts and 14 of 17 field goal attempts.

==== 2020 season ====
After becoming a free agent in March 2020, Folk had a tryout with the Cleveland Browns on August 19, 2020, and visited the Patriots on August 22, 2020. The Patriots re-signed Folk on August 24, 2020. With the acquisition of Brian Hoyer, Folk was forced to pick a new number to wear for the Patriots in the 2020 season, as Hoyer had assumed Folk's number 2, which Folk had worn the previous season. Folk chose number 6, which was the number he wore with the Cowboys. On September 5, 2020, Folk was released by the team and signed with the practice squad the next day. The Patriots elevated Folk to the active roster ahead of their Week 1 game against the Miami Dolphins. In the game, Folk went 3-for-3 on PAT attempts, and 0-for-1 on field goal attempts. He reverted to the practice squad after the game, but was again promoted to the active roster on September 16.

In Week 9 against his former team, the Jets, Folk was a perfect three for three on extra point attempts and three for three on field goal attempts including the 51-yard game-winning field goal during the 30–27 win. Folk was named the AFC Special Teams Player of the Week for his performance in Week 9.

In Week 12 against the Arizona Cardinals, Folk hit the 50-yard game-winning field goal during the 20–17 win. Folk was named the AFC Special Teams Player of the Week for his performance in Week 12. In the 2020 season, Folk converted 30 of 33 extra point attempts and 26 of 28 field goal attempts.

==== 2021 season ====
On March 23, 2021, Folk re-signed with the Patriots. After missing much of training camp due to an undisclosed injury, Folk was released during the final roster cuts and was signed to the practice squad the following day. He was named to the roster for Week 1. In Week 2 against the Jets, Folk gave the Patriots a 3–0 lead by making his 30th field goal in a row. He made his 31st field goal in a row just before halftime against the Jets, which tied the Patriots record for consecutive field goals made held by Stephen Gostkowski. Folk broke Gostkowski's record with his 32nd consecutive field goal in the second half. He was officially signed to the active roster on September 21. His streak of field goals came to an end in week 4 at 36 in a row. Late in the 4th quarter, during the game noted for the return of Tom Brady, the Patriots were trailing 17–19 when Folk attempted a 56-yard field goal in the pouring rain, which had plenty of distance but hit the upright.

On October 13, 2021, Folk was named AFC Special Teams Player of the Week for his performance in the Patriots' 25–22 win over the Houston Texans. Folk connected on all four of his field goal attempts against a hapless Houston team (52, 52, 32, and 21 yards) including the game-winning 21-yard field goal to give the Patriots their 2nd win of the 2021 season. In the 2021 season, Folk converted 42 of 47 extra point attempts and 36 of 39 field goal attempts. He tied with Daniel Carlson for the most points scored for the 2021 season.

==== 2022 season ====
Folk re-signed with the Patriots on March 15, 2022, to a two-year, $5 million deal. On September 25, Folk set an NFL record for most consecutive field goals under 50 yards, hitting his 57th consecutive under 50 yard field goal in a loss against the Baltimore Ravens. On October 16, his streak ended at 64 following a miss on a 45 yard field goal in a win against the Cleveland Browns. In Week 8, Folk converted all five field goals and one extra point in a 22–17 win over the New York Jets, earning AFC Special Teams Player of the Week. In the 2022 season, Folk converted 32 of 35 extra point attempts and 32 of 37 field goal attempts.

Following the placement of Patriots punter Jake Bailey on injured reserve, Folk became the Patriots’ main kickoff specialist. Folk struggled handling kickoffs as he allowed three kickoff returns for touchdowns, one against the Minnesota Vikings and two in a crucial week 18 game against the Buffalo Bills. This resulted in the Patriots elevating practice squad placekicker Tristan Vizcaino during the season, and drafting Maryland kicker Chad Ryland in the 2023 NFL draft.

=== Tennessee Titans ===
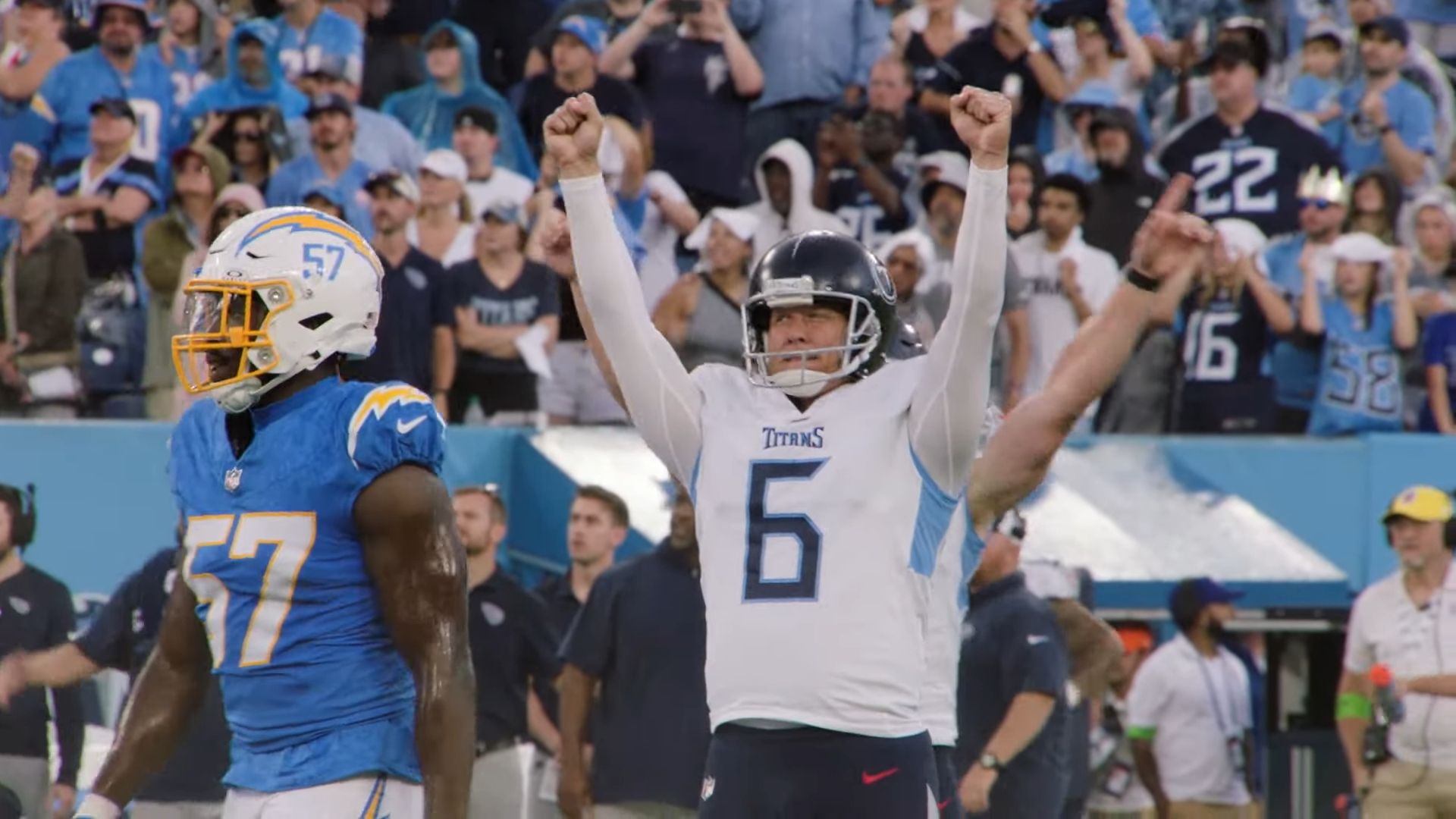
Folk (right) with the Tennessee Titans in 2023

==== 2023 season ====
On August 29, 2023, Folk was traded from the Patriots to the Tennessee Titans in exchange for a 2025 seventh-round draft pick. Folk kicked 5-for-5 in the Titans season opener against the New Orleans Saints, accounting for all of the Titans points in the game. Folk was named the AFC Special Teams Player of the Week in Week 2 after kicking a game-winning 41-yard field goal in overtime against the Los Angeles Chargers. On December 3, 2023, Folk had his first career punt versus the Indianapolis Colts. Folk finished the 2023 season going 29-for-30 on field goals, breaking the Titans' single season record for highest field goal percentage, previously jointly held by Rob Bironas and Al Del Greco.

==== 2024 season ====
On March 20, 2024, Folk re-signed with the Titans. In Week 4, Folk converted all seven of his kicks, including three field goals over 50 yards, in a 31–12 win over the Miami Dolphins, earning AFC Special Teams Player of the Week. In Week 9, Folk kicked a 25-yard field goal in overtime to seal the Titans' 20–17 win over the Patriots. He kicked in 14 games, missing the final three games due to injuries. Despite turning 40 years old in the 2024 season, Folk posted one of his strongest years. He converted 21 out of 22 field goal attempts, including a career high six-for-six at 50+ yards, and tying his former career long at 56 yards. He made all 25 extra point conversions. He led the league in field goal percentage (95.5%) for the second year in a row.

=== New York Jets (second stint) ===
On July 29, 2025, Folk signed a one-year contract to return to the New York Jets. On September 29, Folk kicked a 58-yard field goal, a career-long. In Week 13 against the Atlanta Falcons, Folk made a 56-yard game-winning field goal, giving the Jets a 27–24 victory and marking the 20th game-winning field goal of his career. Folk completed the 2025 NFL season going 28-for-29 on field goals, leading the NFL in field goal percentage at 96.6% (alongside Eddy Piñeiro) for the third consecutive season.

=== Atlanta Falcons ===
On March 12, 2026, Folk signed a two-year contract with the Atlanta Falcons. In Week 9 against the Cincinnati Bengals, Folk missed a 38-yard field goal, ending his record-breaking streak of field goals made from inside 40 yards at 107, dating back to October 5, 2017. He was released on November 11 after missing five field goals and an extra point through nine games.

== NFL career statistics ==
Legend
	Led the league
**Bold**	Career high

Year	Team	GP	Overall FGs				PATs			Kickoffs			Points
Year	Team	GP	Lng	FGM	FGA	Pct	XPM	XPA	Pct	KO	Avg	TB	Points
2007	DAL	16	53	26	31	83.9	**53**	**53**	100.0	**94**	61.7	4	131
2008	DAL	16	52	20	22	90.9	42	42	100.0	75	60.1	—	102
2009	DAL	14	51	18	28	64.3	36	36	100.0	2	8.5	—	90
2010	NYJ	16	56	30	**39**	76.9	37	37	100.0	81	61.6	7	127
2011	NYJ	16	51	19	25	76.0	44	44	100.0	81	62.9	17	101
2012	NYJ	16	54	21	27	77.8	30	30	100.0	68	62.2	12	93
2013	NYJ	16	54	33	36	91.7	27	27	100.0	73	62.8	30	126
2014	NYJ	16	55	32	**39**	82.1	23	23	100.0	69	62.9	21	119
2015	NYJ	8	55	13	16	81.3	19	19	100.0	39	**63.2**	13	58
2016	NYJ	16	51	27	31	87.1	24	26	92.3	70	**63.2**	**39**	105
2017	TB	4	50	6	11	54.5	7	9	77.8	18	61.9	13	25
2019	NE	7	51	14	17	82.4	12	12	100.0	1	41.0	—	54
2020	NE	16	51	26	28	92.9	30	33	90.9	3	57.3	—	108
2021	NE	**17**	53	**36**	**39**	92.3	42	47	89.4	10	60.4	3	**150**
2022	NE	**17**	54	32	37	86.5	32	35	91.4	35	59.0	3	128
2023	TEN	**17**	53	29	30	**96.7**	28	30	93.3	63	62.3	32	115
2024	TEN	14	56	21	22	95.5	25	25	100.0	58	**63.2**	37	88
2025	NYJ	16	**58**	28	29	96.6	22	22	100.0	29	55	6	106
2026	ATL	9	51	13	18	72.2	17	18	94.4	40	61	0	56
Total		267	58	454	524	84.6	550	568	96.8	909	62	237	1,882

== Career highlights ==
=== Awards and honors ===
NFL

- Pro Bowl (2007)
- PFWA All-NFC (2007)
- Pro Football Focus All-Pro Team (2013)
- PFWA NFL All-Rookie Team (2007)
- 9× AFC Special Teams Player of the Week (Week 5, 2010; Week 1, 2013; Week 9, 2013; Week 9, 2020; Week 12, 2020; Week 5, 2021; Week 8, 2022; Week 2, 2023; Week 4, 2024)
- NFC Special Teams Player of the Week (Week 5, 2007)
- Pro Football Weekly NFL Special Teams Player of the Week (Week 12, 2008)
- Diet Pepsi NFL Rookie of the Week (Week 5, 2007)
- NFL scoring leader in 2021 (150 points) – Tied with Daniel Carlson

College

- First-team All-Pac-10 (2006)

=== Records ===
==== NFL records ====
- Most consecutive field goals made from inside 40 yards - 107

==== Titans franchise records ====
- Highest single-season field goal percentage (96.7%) – 2023 season

==== Jets franchise records ====
- Most walkoff field goal kicks – 6
- Most 50-yard field goals in a season – 7
- Most 50-yard field goal makes – 25
- Highest single-season field goal percentage (96.6%) – 2025 season

== Personal life ==
Folk was born to Anton and Kathryn Folk in Hollywood, CA. His father, who was born in Austria to Danube Swabians parents, is an accountant. Folk's mother is a pediatrician. Nick Folk and his younger brothers, Erik and Gregory, are dual citizens of the United States and Germany, where his father grew up.

Erik was the placekicker for the University of Washington Huskies football team through the 2011 season. Gregory Folk was a soccer player for UCLA and has played for Los Angeles Galaxy. The Folks' cousin, Blake Robinson, was diagnosed with neurofibromatosis when at eighteen months of age. Folk partnered with the Children's Tumor Foundation to support the research of NF.

He majored in marketing at Arizona. He is an avid soccer fan, attends New York Red Bulls games when in the area, and is a member of the Viking Army Supporters Club. He is married to his wife, Julianne, and they have 4 children; twin boys, a daughter, and another younger son.
