= List of NFL quarterbacks with 5,000 passing yards in a season =

Passing for 5,000 yards in a single regular season is a rare achievement in the National Football League (NFL). Nine quarterbacks have accomplished the feat. Dan Marino was the first to cross the threshold with 5,084 yards set during the 1984 season, which went unchallenged for a record 24 years, and for almost a decade after his 1999 retirement. Peyton Manning holds the record with 5,477 passing yards in 2013; this surpassed Drew Brees, who recorded a then-record 5,476 passing yards in 2011, by one yard. Drew Brees, Tom Brady, and Patrick Mahomes are the only NFL quarterbacks to have multiple 5,000 yards seasons; Brees accomplished the feat a record five times, while Brady and Mahomes have accomplished it twice. Matthew Stafford is the only 5,000-yard passer with a 500-yard game in the same season. All quarterbacks have needed at least 600 passing attempts to achieve the yardage, with the exception of Marino (564) and Mahomes (580, 2018 season). Only Marino (362), Winston (380), and Mahomes (383, 2018 season) have done so with fewer than 400 pass completions.

In 2011, Tom Brady, Drew Brees, and Matthew Stafford each threw for over 5,000 yards. Patrick Mahomes and Ben Roethlisberger both accomplished it in 2018, making Mahomes the only quarterback to reach that plateau in both the NCAA and NFL. NFL quarterbacks have passed for 5,000 yards in a season fifteen times. Despite the rarity of a 5,000-yard passing season, only four have resulted in MVP Honors. Patrick Mahomes earned it twice in 2018 and 2022, while Dan Marino and Peyton Manning have earned it once in 1984 and 2013 respectively. Stafford, Roethlisberger, and Jameis Winston are the only quarterbacks to not be selected to the Pro Bowl the same year of their 5,000-yard season. Patrick Mahomes has accomplished this feat most recently, throwing for 5,250 yards in the 2022 season. In the postseason, he became the first 5,000-yard passer to win the Super Bowl. The Tampa Bay Buccaneers are the only franchise to have multiple quarterbacks (Winston and Brady) accomplish 5,000 passing yards.

All have done it while playing the full season. In 2021, the NFL approved a 17-game schedule, increasing the likelihood of a 5,000 yard passer.

== NFL players with 5,000 passing yards in a season ==
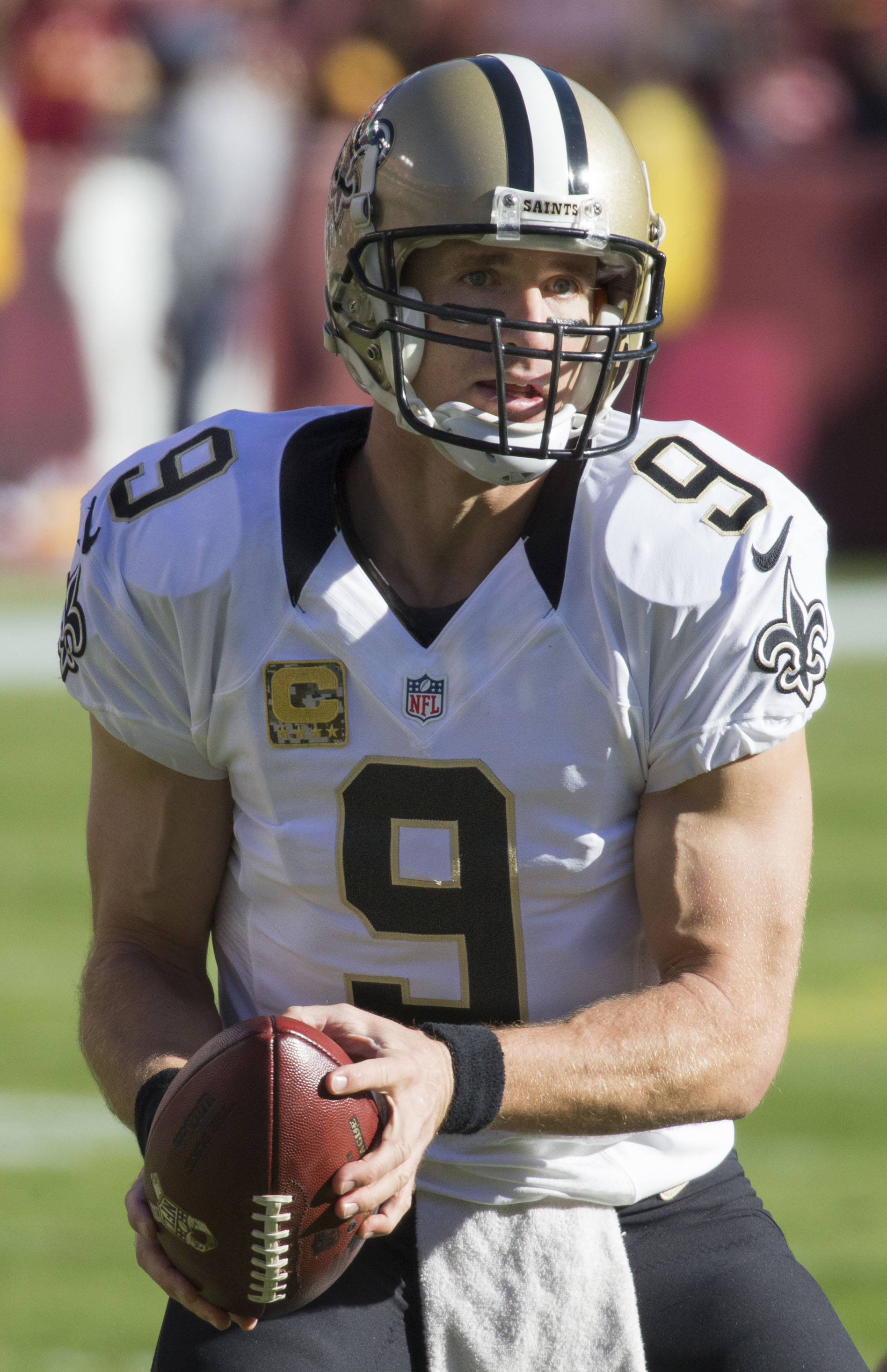
Drew Brees has the most 5,000-yard seasons by a quarterback, with five.

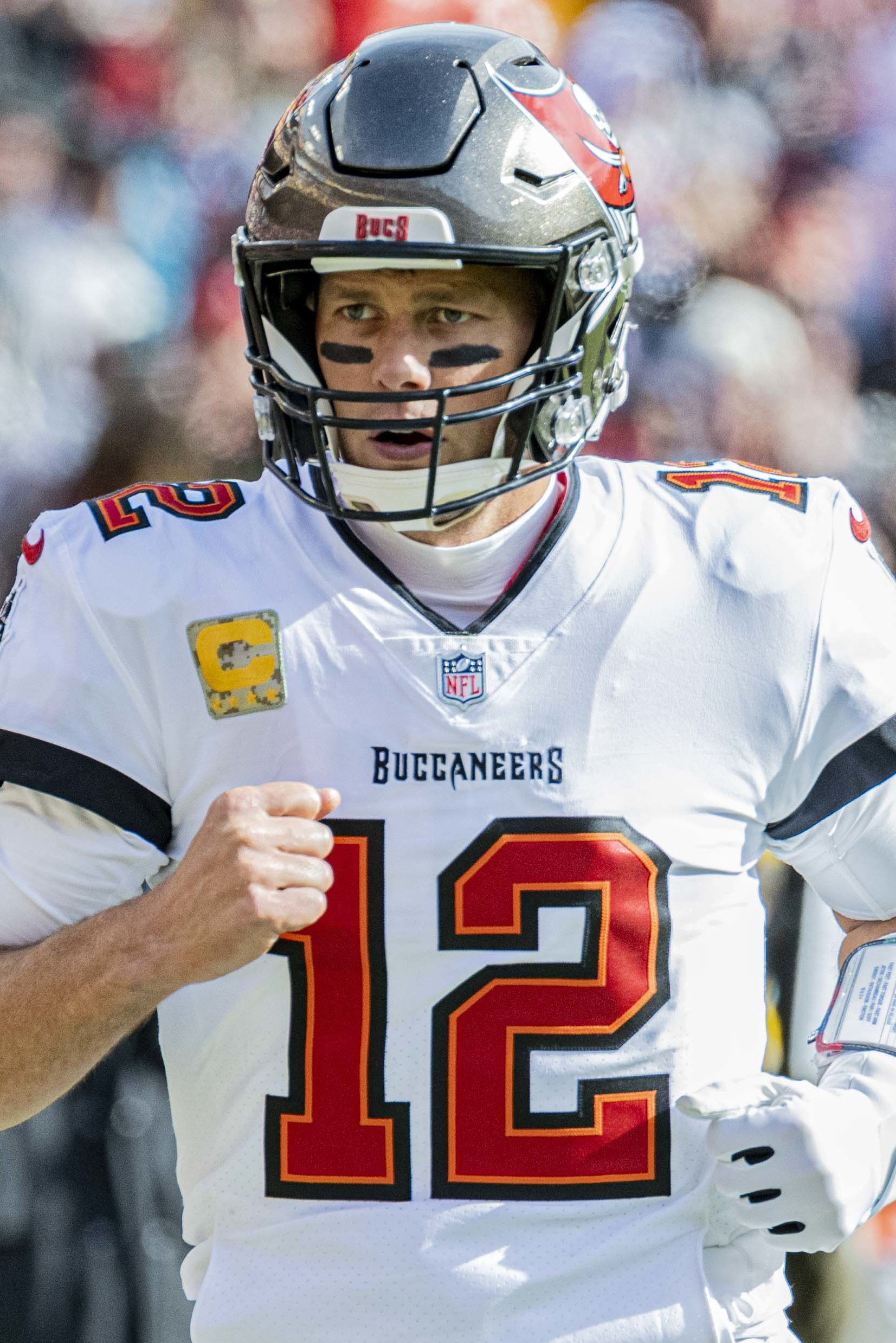
Tom Brady is the oldest to pass for 5,000 yards at age 44 in 2021.

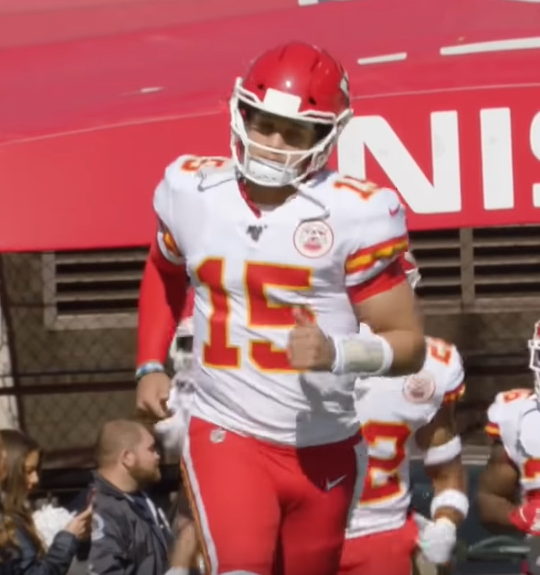
Patrick Mahomes threw for 5,000 yards in 2018 and most recently 2022.

Quarterback	Team	Yards	Season	Games played	Notes
Dan Marino^	Miami Dolphins	5,084*	1984	16	NFL MVP, first player to pass for over 5,000 yards in a season
Drew Brees	New Orleans Saints	5,069	2008	16	Offensive Player of the Year
Drew Brees (2)	New Orleans Saints	5,476*	2011	16	Offensive Player of the Year, first quarterback with multiple 5,000-yard seasons
Tom Brady	New England Patriots	5,235	2011	16	
Matthew Stafford	Detroit Lions	5,038	2011	16	Comeback Player of the Year
Drew Brees (3)	New Orleans Saints	5,177	2012	16	Second consecutive season passing for over 5,000 yards
Peyton Manning^	Denver Broncos	5,477*	2013	16	NFL MVP
Drew Brees (4)	New Orleans Saints	5,162	2013	16	Third consecutive season passing for over 5,000 yards
Drew Brees (5)	New Orleans Saints	5,208	2016	16	
Ben Roethlisberger	Pittsburgh Steelers	5,129	2018	16	
Patrick Mahomes^	Kansas City Chiefs	5,097	2018	16	NFL MVP
Jameis Winston	Tampa Bay Buccaneers	5,109	2019	16	Led league in interceptions thrown (30)
Tom Brady (2)	Tampa Bay Buccaneers	5,316	2021	17	
Justin Herbert	Los Angeles Chargers	5,014	2021	17	
Patrick Mahomes^ (2)	Kansas City Chiefs	5,250	2022	17	NFL MVP

*League record ^Named MVP

== Most seasons with 5,000 passing yards ==
Count	Player	Seasons	Team(s)
5	Drew Brees	2008, 2011, 2012, 2013, 2016	New Orleans Saints
2	Patrick Mahomes	2018, 2022	Kansas City Chiefs
2	Tom Brady	2011, 2021	New England Patriots (1), Tampa Bay Buccaneers (1)

== 4,000 passing yards in a season ==
4,000 yards passing in a season was once considered a rare feat but has lost a bit of significance over the years. During the fourteen-game era, only Joe Namath of the New York Jets passed for over 4,000 yards in a season with 4,007 yards passing in the 1967 AFL season. During the 1980s and 1990s, 4,000 yards became the standard for the league leaders in the NFL. Over the last decade, 4,000 yards has become almost commonplace in the NFL for quarterbacks. This may be a result of less emphasis being placed on the running game and rule changes that serve to offer greater protection to quarterbacks and their receivers. Every team except the Chicago Bears has had a 4,000 yard quarterback season, with the Bears and Jets being the only ones to never have had one with a 16 or 17 game schedule. Peyton Manning and Tom Brady have had the most 4,000 yard seasons (14).
