= Drew Brees =

American football player and television analyst (born 1979)

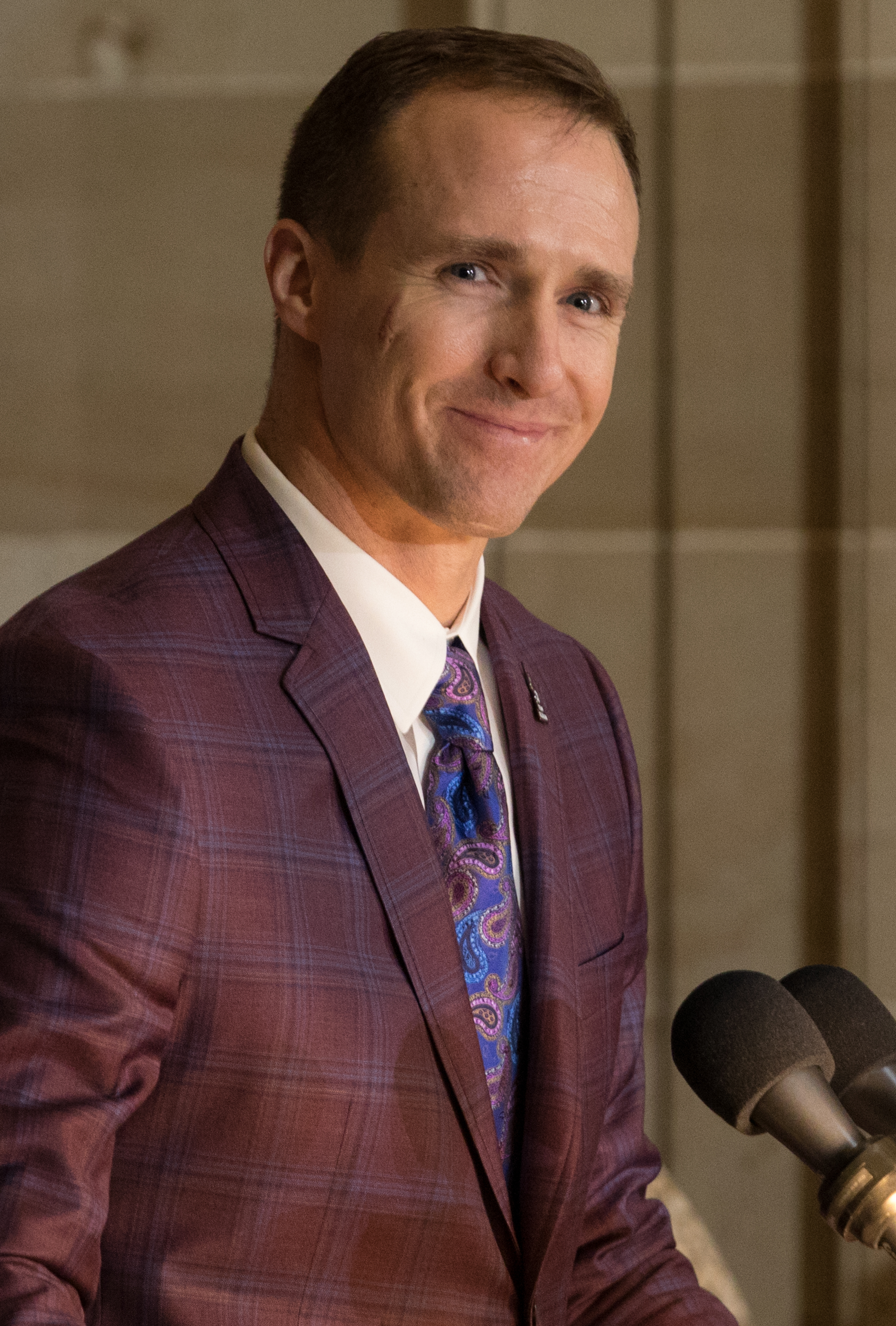
- Brees in 2020

No. 9
- Position: Quarterback

Personal information
- Born: January 15, 1979 (age 47); Dallas, Texas, U.S.
- Listed height: 6 ft 0 in (1.83 m)
- Listed weight: 209 lb (95 kg)

Career information
- High school: Westlake (Austin, Texas)
- College: Purdue (1997–2000)
- NFL draft: 2001: 2nd round, 32nd overall pick

Career history

Playing
- San Diego Chargers (2001–2005); New Orleans Saints (2006–2020)

Coaching
- Purdue (2022) Interim assistant coach

Awards and highlights
- Super Bowl champion (XLIV); Super Bowl MVP (XLIV); 2× NFL Offensive Player of the Year (2008, 2011); NFL Comeback Player of the Year (2004); First-team All-Pro (2006); 4× Second-team All-Pro (2008, 2009, 2011, 2018); 13× Pro Bowl (2004, 2006, 2008–2014, 2016–2019); 7× NFL passing yards leader (2006, 2008, 2011, 2012, 2014–2016); 4× NFL passing touchdowns leader (2008, 2009, 2011, 2012); 2× NFL passer rating leader (2009, 2018); 6× NFL completion percentage leader (2009–2011, 2017–2019); New Orleans Saints Hall of Fame; AP Athlete of the Year (2010); SI Sportsperson of the Year (2010); Bert Bell Award (2009); Walter Payton NFL Man of the Year (2006); Maxwell Award (2000); 2× Third-team All-American (1999, 2000); Big Ten Most Valuable Player (2000); 2× Big Ten Offensive Player of the Year (1998, (Note: Co-winner this season alongside Joe Germaine.) 2000); 2× First-team All-Big Ten (1999, 2000); Second-team All-Big Ten (1998); NFL records: Highest completion percentage in a season: 74.4% (2018); Most passing touchdowns in a game: 7 (tied); Most consecutive games with a touchdown pass: 54; Most career 5,000 yards seasons: 5

Career NFL statistics
- Passing attempts: 10,551
- Passing completions: 7,142
- Completion percentage: 67.7%
- TD–INT: 571–243
- Passing yards: 80,358
- Passer rating: 98.7
- Rushing yards: 752
- Rushing touchdowns: 25
- Stats at Pro Football Reference
- Pro Football Hall of Fame

Drew Christopher Brees (/briːz/; born January 15, 1979) is an American former professional football quarterback who played in the National Football League (NFL) for 20 seasons. A member of the New Orleans Saints for most of his career, he is second all-time in career passing yards, career touchdown passes, and career pass completions, and third in career completion percentage. Brees also holds the record of consecutive games with a touchdown pass, breaking the record held by Johnny Unitas for 52 years. He is regarded as one of the greatest quarterbacks of all time.

Brees played college football for the Purdue Boilermakers, winning the Maxwell Award and Big Ten Most Valuable Player in 2000 and setting the Big Ten Conference records for completions, attempts, and yards. Due to questions over his height and arm strength, he was not selected until the second round of the 2001 NFL draft by the San Diego Chargers. Brees initially struggled before having a breakout season in 2004 when he led the Chargers to their first playoff appearance since 1995 and first division title since 1994, earning him Pro Bowl and Comeback Player of the Year honors. The following year, Brees suffered a potentially career-ending injury and left the Chargers in free agency.

Joining the Saints, Brees brought new success to a franchise that had only seven winning seasons, five playoff appearances, and one postseason win during the 39 years prior to his arrival. From 2006 to 2020, he led the Saints to seven division titles (including four consecutive from 2017 to 2020), nine playoff appearances, nine playoff wins, three NFC Championship Game appearances, and the franchise's first Super Bowl title in Super Bowl XLIV, earning him the game's MVP award. By the conclusion of his 15 seasons in New Orleans, he was twice named Offensive Player of the Year, extended his Pro Bowl selections to 13, and was selected to one first-team All-Pro. He also led the league in passing yards a record seven times. Brees retired after the 2020 season and spent the following year as an analyst on NBC Sunday Night Football. He also served as an interim assistant football coach with Purdue in 2022. Brees was inducted to the Pro Football Hall of Fame in 2026.

== Early life ==
Brees was born on January 15, 1979 in Dallas, Texas, to Eugene Wilson "Chip" Brees II, a prominent trial lawyer, and Mina Ruth (née Akins; died 2009), an attorney. His grandfather fought in the Battle of Okinawa. A Sports Illustrated article stated he was named for Dallas Cowboys wide receiver Drew Pearson but in a 2014 interview Brees said this story was "just legend". He has a younger brother, Reid (born 1981). When Brees was seven, his parents divorced and shared custody of the boys, who split their time between both parents' homes. Today, he admits that it was a very tough and challenging life after the divorce; however, Brees and his younger brother, Reid, supported each other and became very close. They have a younger half-sister, Audrey, from their father's remarriage to Amy Hightower, daughter of the late U.S. Representative (D-TX) Jack English Hightower. Brees was raised Baptist.

Both of Brees's parents had athletic backgrounds. His father played basketball at Texas A&M, and his mother was a former all-state athlete in three sports in high school. His maternal uncle, Marty Akins, was an All-American starting quarterback for the Texas Longhorns college football team from 1972 to 1975, and his maternal grandfather, Ray Akins, had the third-most victories as a Texas high school football coach, in his three decades at Gregory-Portland High School. His younger brother, Reid, was an outfielder for the Baylor Bears baseball team, which made the 2005 College World Series; Reid now resides in Colorado, where he works in sales.

After moving to the Austin area, Brees did not play tackle football until high school and was on the flag football team at St. Andrew's Episcopal School, where his teammates included actor Ben McKenzie, who was in the same year. In high school, he was a varsity letterman in baseball, basketball, and football, and was considering playing college baseball rather than football. College recruiters quickly ran after Brees blew out his knee in the 11th grade. After overcoming the ACL tear, he was selected as Texas High School 5A Most Valuable Offensive Player in 1996 and led the Austin Westlake High School football team to a 16–0 record and a state championship. As a high school football player, Brees completed 314 of 490 passes (64.1 percent) for 5,461 yards with 50 touchdowns, including in his senior season, 211 of 333 passes (63.4 percent) for 3,528 yards with 31 touchdowns. When Brees started for two seasons, Westlake went 28–0–1 and beat a Dominic Rhodes-led Abilene Cooper 55–15 in the 1996 title game. He was given honorable mention in the state high school all-star football team and the USA Today All-USA high school football team, alongside former San Diego Chargers teammate and longtime friend LaDainian Tomlinson. Brees had hoped to follow in his father's and uncle's footsteps and play for the Texas Longhorns or Texas A&M Aggies, but was not heavily recruited despite his stellar record.

== College career ==
Brees received offers from only two colleges, Purdue and Kentucky, choosing Purdue for its highly rated academics. He graduated in 2001 with a degree in industrial management, and is a member of the Sigma Chi fraternity.

After a relatively uneventful freshman season, Brees was given his first start during his sophomore year by Boilermakers head coach Joe Tiller and became an integral part of Tiller and Jim Chaney's unorthodox "basketball on grass" spread offense, serving as offensive captain during his junior and senior years. In the 1998 season, in a game against Wisconsin, Brees tied an NCAA single-game record with 55 completions and set the NCAA record for pass attempts in a single game with 83. He finished 31–24 loss with 494 yards, two touchdowns and four interceptions. He had the option to make himself available for the 2000 NFL draft but chose to return for his senior year to complete his studies. In 2000, he led the Boilermakers to memorable last-minute upsets against top-ranked Ohio State and Michigan en route to the Boilermakers' first Big Ten championship (shared with Michigan and Northwestern) since 1967. The Ohio State game was replayed on ESPN Classic and is widely remembered for Brees's four interceptions and 64-yard touchdown pass to Seth Morales with 1:55 remaining to seal a vital 31–27 win, prompting commentator Brent Musburger to exclaim "Holy Toledo!" and a post-game field rush. Brees helped lead Purdue to a #9 ranking in the AP Poll, the program's highest spot since the 1980 season, during the year. Due to head-to-head victories over Michigan and Northwestern, Purdue won the invitation to the 2001 Rose Bowl, which was the school's first appearance there since 1967.

Brees was a finalist for the Davey O'Brien Award as the nation's best quarterback in 1999. He won the Maxwell Award as the nation's outstanding player of 2000 and the NCAA's Today's Top VIII Award as a member of the Class of 2001. Brees was also fourth in Heisman Trophy voting in 1999 and third in 2000. As a senior, Brees became the first Boilermaker since Bruce Brineman in 1989 to earn Academic All-America honors. Additionally, he won Academic All-Big Ten honors a record three times, was initiated into Mortar Board and awarded the Big Ten Medal of Honor and the NFF National Scholar-Athlete Award. Brees also was awarded Purdue's Leonard Wilson Award for unselfishness and dedication.

In his college career, Brees set two NCAA records, 13 Big Ten Conference records, and 19 Purdue University records. He left Purdue with Big Ten Conference records in passing yards (11,792), touchdown passes (90), total offensive yards (12,693), completions (1,026), and attempts (1,678). He tied an NCAA record with the 99-yard pass to receiver Vinny Sutherland against Northwestern on September 25, 1999, and held the NCAA record for pass attempts in a game (83) for 15 years, until Washington State quarterback Connor Halliday broke it in October 2013.

In 2009, Brees was inducted into Purdue's Intercollegiate Athletics Hall of Fame. The Big Ten Conference's Griese–Brees Quarterback of the Year award initiated in 2011 was named in his and Bob Griese's honor. He was named the Big Ten's best quarterback of the 1990s and ranked number 48 on the 2010 documentary Big Ten Icons, featuring the conference's top fifty student-athletes.

== Professional career ==
Pre-draft measurables
Height	Weight	Arm length	Hand span	40-yard dash	10-yard split	20-yard split	20-yard shuttle	Three-cone drill	Vertical jump	Broad jump	Wonderlic
6 ft 0 1/4 in (1.84 m)	213 lb (97 kg)	31 in (0.79 m)	10 1/4 in (0.26 m)	4.83 s	1.66 s	2.75 s	4.21 s	7.09 s	32 in (0.81 m)	8 ft 9 in (2.67 m)	28
All values from NFL Combine

=== San Diego Chargers (2001–2005) ===
==== 2001 NFL draft ====
Brees's college success led to projections that he would be a mid–late first-round draft pick in the 2001 NFL draft, but he slipped due to concerns about his relatively short stature for a professional quarterback (6 ft 0 in (1.83 m)), a perceived lack of arm strength, and a sense that he had succeeded in college in a spread offense. Brees was the second quarterback selected in the 2001 NFL draft behind Michael Vick of Virginia Tech. He was chosen by the San Diego Chargers with the first pick of the second round with the 32nd overall pick. San Diego originally had the first pick in that draft, but traded it to Atlanta (who drafted Vick) in return for the fifth pick of the first round with which San Diego drafted LaDainian Tomlinson.

==== Early career ====
In his rookie season, Brees was the backup quarterback to Doug Flutie, who started all 16 games that season. Brees played in his first professional game on November 4, 2001, against the Kansas City Chiefs in Week 8. He came into the game to relieve Flutie, who had suffered a concussion. He finished with 221 passing yards and his first career passing touchdown, a 20-yard pass to Freddie Jones. The game against the Chiefs was Brees's lone appearance as a rookie.

On August 19, 2002, Brees was named the starter for the 2002 season over Doug Flutie. He started all 16 games for the Chargers. The season started off well for the Chargers with a 6–1 start, but faded down the stretch with a 2–7 record over the last nine games to finish 8–8. He finished the 2002 season with 3,284 passing yards, 17 touchdowns, and 16 interceptions.

In Week 4 of the 2003 season, Brees recorded a 21-yard touchdown reception on a pass thrown by LaDainian Tomlinson in the 34–31 overtime loss to the Oakland Raiders. After a disappointing 1–7 start to the 2003 season, Brees was replaced by Flutie, though he regained the job by Week 15. In 11 games, he finished with 2,108 passing yards, 11 touchdowns, and 15 interceptions.

==== 2004 season ====
Brees's career with the Chargers was in jeopardy after San Diego acquired NC State's Philip Rivers after the 2004 NFL draft. With a looming quarterback controversy, he performed well through training camp and the preseason, while Rivers held out during training camp, essentially guaranteeing Brees the job to begin the season with Rivers as his backup.

Brees remained the starter throughout the 2004 season, where he started 15 games and led the team to a 12–4 regular season record. In Week 8, against the Oakland Raiders, he was 22 of 25 for 281 yards and five touchdowns in the 42–14 victory to earn his first AFC Offensive Player of the Week honor. Brees posted spectacular numbers, completing 65.5% of his passes for 3,159 yards, with 27 touchdowns to only seven interceptions, giving him a 104.8 passer rating. The Chargers won the AFC West for the first time in ten seasons and Brees was selected to the 2004 Pro Bowl. He was named 2004 NFL Comeback Player of the Year. In the Wild Card Round against the New York Jets, Brees had 319 passing yards, two passing touchdowns, and one interception in the 20–17 overtime loss.

==== 2005 season ====
Brees became a free agent after the 2004 season and was not expected to return to San Diego, which had already committed a large sum of money to Rivers. The team eventually designated Brees a franchise player, giving him a one-year contract that quadrupled his pay to $8 million for 2005. Under the terms of the franchise player contract, Brees was eligible to be traded or to sign with another team, but the Chargers would receive two future first-round draft choices in return. He was not traded and continued as the starting quarterback for the remainder of the 2005 season.

After a 1–2 start, Brees helped lead a 41–17 victory over the New England Patriots. He was 19 of 24 for 248 passing yards and two touchdowns and earned AFC Offensive Player of the Week for the effort. He posted a career-high in passing yards with 3,576. Brees also posted an 89.2 rating, 10th best in the NFL. However, in the last game of the 2005 season against the Denver Broncos, Brees tore his labrum while trying to pick up his own fumble after being hit by Broncos safety John Lynch. Denver tackle Gerard Warren hit Brees while he was on the ground, causing the injury. Brees underwent arthroscopic surgery, performed by Dr. James Andrews, to repair the torn labrum in his right (throwing) shoulder on January 5, 2006. Subsequent reports mentioned additional partial rotator cuff damage and he also was treated by Dr. Saby Szajowitz to recover and regain muscle movement.

After the season, the Chargers offered Brees a five-year, $50 million contract that paid $2 million in base salary the first year and the rest heavily based on performance incentives.

=== New Orleans Saints (2006–2020) ===
After the Chargers refused to increase their offer, Brees met with other teams. The New Orleans Saints and the Miami Dolphins were interested in Brees. New Orleans made an offer that included $10 million in guaranteed money the first year and a $12 million option the second year. Miami was unsure whether Brees' shoulder was completely healed and doctors suggested the team should not sign him because of the injury. The Dolphins ended negotiations and traded for Minnesota Vikings quarterback Daunte Culpepper instead. Brees signed a six-year, $60 million deal with the Saints on March 14, 2006. The Dolphins' decision to not sign Brees was the reason why Nick Saban resigned and left to coach for the Alabama Crimson Tide.

==== 2006 season ====
Brees had a productive first year with the Saints. The team, under first-year head coach Sean Payton, rebounded from its disastrous 2005 season, when the team was unable to play in New Orleans due to the damage caused by Hurricane Katrina and struggled to a 3–13 record, to finish with a 10–6 regular season record and won the NFC South division title. The Saints also earned the NFC's second seed as well as a first-round bye. On November 5, in the 31–14 victory over the Tampa Bay Buccaneers, he had 314 passing yards and three touchdowns to earn his first NFC Offensive Player of the Week honor. On November 19, in a 31–16 loss against the Cincinnati Bengals, he threw for a career-high 510 passing yards, two touchdowns, and three interceptions. Brees's 510 passing yards marked a single-game franchise record and was the sixth most for a single game in NFL history at the time. In Week 14, a 42–17 victory over the Dallas Cowboys, he had 384 passing yards and five touchdowns to earn his second NFC Offensive Player of the Week award in 2006. Brees threw a league-leading and franchise record 4,418 passing yards, finished third in the league with 26 touchdown passes and 11 interceptions, and had a 96.2 passer rating. Brees was named starting quarterback for the NFC in the 2007 Pro Bowl and was named as a First-team All-Pro. On January 5, 2007, Brees was named first runner-up behind former teammate Tomlinson for league MVP by the Associated Press. Brees and Tomlinson were co-recipients of the Walter Payton NFL Man of the Year Award.

On January 13, 2007, in his first playoff game for New Orleans, Brees was 20–of–32 in passing attempts with one touchdown and no interceptions against the Philadelphia Eagles in the Divisional Round at the Louisiana Superdome. The Saints held on to win 27–24, and advanced to the franchise's first NFC Championship Game against the Chicago Bears. Though he completed 27 of 49 passes for 354 yards and two touchdowns, Brees committed three costly turnovers, and was penalized for an intentional grounding in the endzone, resulting in a safety, as the Saints lost in the NFC Championship by a score of 39–14. Brees dislocated his left elbow during the first quarter of the Pro Bowl.

==== 2007 season ====
Brees's second season with the Saints started rough with a 0–4 start, with three losses by the Saints in that stretch by at least 17 points. However, the Saints started a winning streak after Week 5. In Week 8, a 31–10 victory over the San Francisco 49ers, he had 336 passing yards and four touchdowns to earn NFC Offensive Player of the Week. After the next game, a 41–24 victory over the Jacksonville Jaguars, the Saints were back at .500 with a 4–4 record. In Week 15, a 31–24 victory over the Arizona Cardinals, he had 315 passing yards and two touchdowns to earn another NFC Offensive Player of the Week nod in 2007. In Week 17, against the Chicago Bears, Brees tied Aaron Brooks's franchise record for pass attempts in a single game with 60 in the 33–25 loss. Overall, in the 2007 season, Brees passed for 4,423 yards, topped his own record and tied a then franchise record with 28 touchdowns. He also set the NFL record previously held by Rich Gannon for pass completions in a single season with 440. However, the Saints missed the playoffs with a 7–9 record.

==== 2008 season ====
In 2008, the Saints finished 8–8 and again missed the playoffs but Brees had a strong year statistically, finishing 15 yards short of the NFL record for passing yards thrown in a single season set by Dan Marino in 1984. In Week 3, against the Denver Broncos, Brees set a single-game franchise record for pass completions with 39 in the 34–32 loss. He passed for 421 yards and a passing touchdown in the loss. Brees earned NFC Offensive Player of the Month for September, going over 300 passing yards and having a passer rating over 110 in three of the four games. In Week 6, a 34–3 victory over the Oakland Raiders, he was 26 of 30 for 320 yards and three touchdowns to earn NFC Offensive Player of the Week. In Week 8, a 37–32 victory over the San Diego Chargers, he had 339 passing yards and three touchdowns to earn another NFC Offensive Player of the Week nod. In Week 12, a 51–29 win over the Green Bay Packers, he had 323 passing yards and four touchdowns to earn his third NFC Offensive Player of the Week honor in 2008. He finished the season with 5,069 yards and became the second quarterback in NFL history to throw for over 5,000 yards in a season.

He passed for 300 yards ten times during the 2008 season, tying Rich Gannon's 2002 record. He was named FedEx Air Player of the Week for his performances during Weeks 8 and 12 and was named the AP 2008 Offensive Player of the Year. He was named to his third career Pro Bowl for his 2008 season.

Brees started to serve on the executive committee of the National Football League Players Association this season. He remained on the committee through the 2014 season.

==== 2009 season: Super Bowl XLIV ====
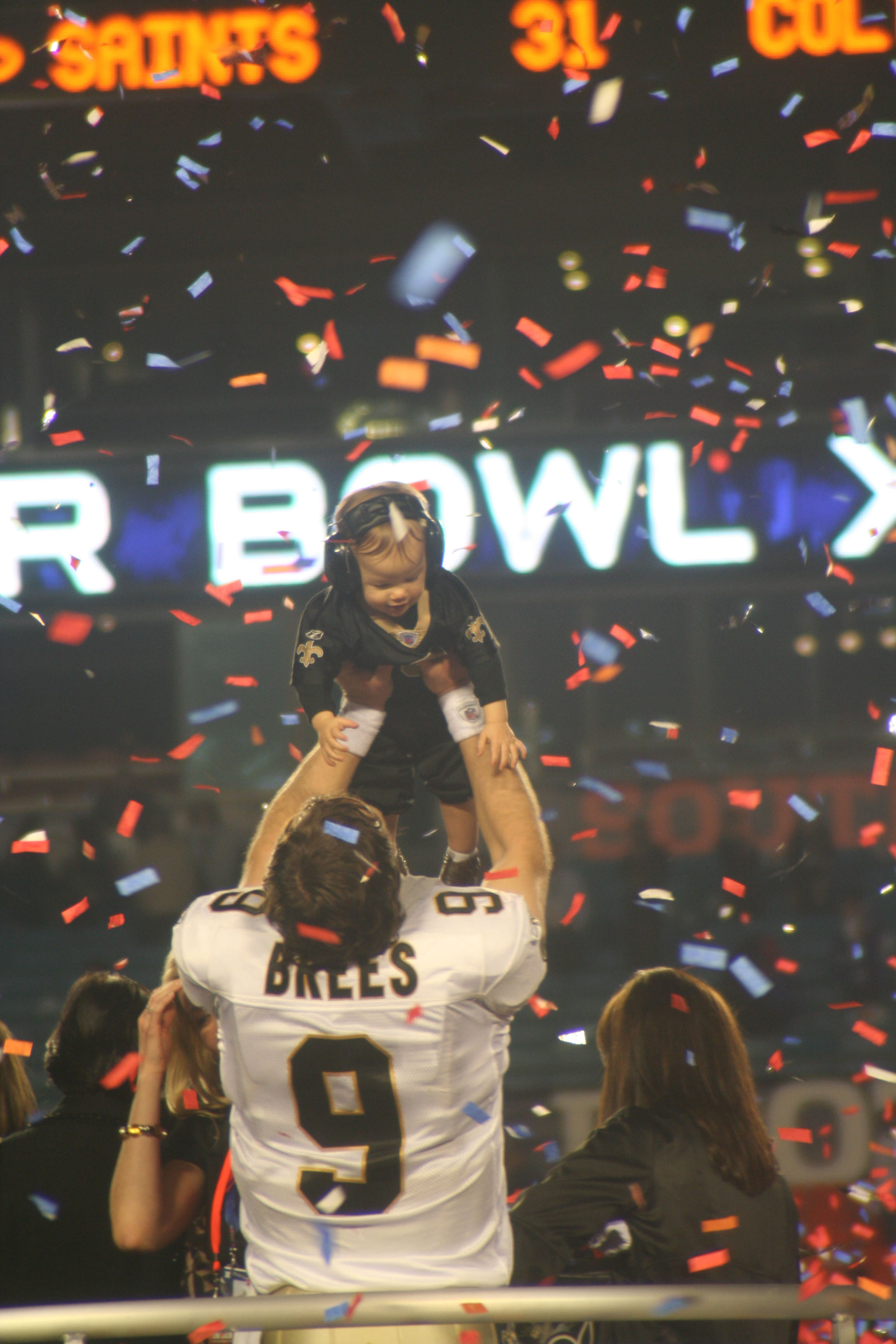
Brees celebrating the Super Bowl win with his son Baylen

In the first game of the 2009 season against the Detroit Lions, Brees set a career-high and franchise-tying record with six touchdown passes, going 26 out of 34 for 358 yards. He earned NFC Offensive Player of the Week for his performance against the Lions. The next week, Brees led the Saints to a 48–22 win over the Philadelphia Eagles, throwing for 311 yards and three touchdown passes. Brees also tied the record for most touchdown passes by the end of Week 2 with nine touchdowns. Following Week 3, Brees was named NFC Offensive Player of the Month for September. In Week 6, against the 5–0 New York Giants, Brees completed 23 of 30 passes for 369 yards, four touchdown passes, and a passer rating of 156.8 in a dominant 48–27 victory to his second NFC Offensive Player of the Week nod of the season.

In Week 7, Brees led a dramatic comeback victory on the road against the Miami Dolphins, 46–34. The Saints quickly faced a 24–3 deficit in the second quarter, trailing for the first time all season at that point, and failing to score on their first possession as they had in all of their previous contests. Brees had a poor outing, but provided two crucial rushing touchdowns, one just before halftime to narrow the deficit to 24–10, and one in the third quarter to give the Saints their first lead of the game, 37–34. The 21-point comeback tied for the largest in franchise history.

The next week, Brees threw for 308 yards on 25 of 33 passing along with two touchdowns and one interception in leading the Saints to a 35–27 victory and franchise tying best start at 7–0 against the rival Atlanta Falcons. In week 9, Brees helped guide the team to a 30–20 victory over the Carolina Panthers. This was Brees's first victory over the Carolina Panthers in the Superdome and gave the Saints their best start in franchise history at 8–0. In Week 12, Brees led the Saints to an 11–0 record, defeating the New England Patriots 38–17. Brees totaled 371 yards passing, posting a perfect passer rating of 158.3, and became the first player to throw for five touchdowns against a team coached by Bill Belichick. He earned his third NFC Offensive Player of the Week nod for the 2009 season. After close victories over the Washington Redskins and Falcons in successive weeks to start 13–0, Brees and the Saints lost for the first time that season to the Dallas Cowboys, 24–17, after DeMarcus Ware caused a Brees fumble in the final seconds, ending a fourth quarter rally. The Saints lost their last two games, with Brees sitting out the Week 17 finale against the Carolina Panthers. Their 13–3 record secured the #1 seed in the NFC. The 13 regular season victories set a single-season franchise record for the Saints.

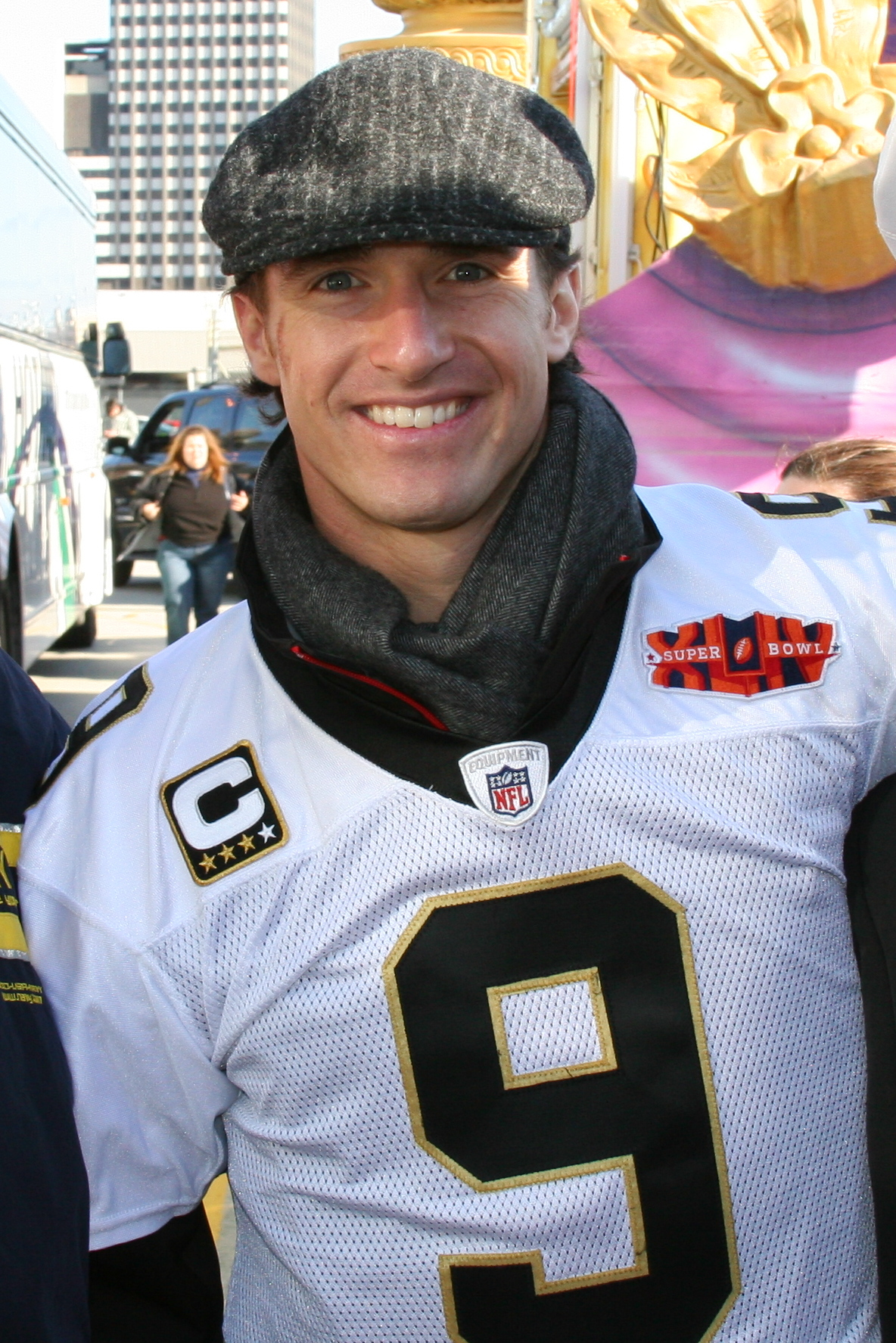
Brees at the Saints Super Bowl XLIV victory parade.

Brees's individual statistics led to numerous accolades, including a Pro Bowl selection, the Maxwell Football Club's Bert Bell Award, and runner-up in voting for the AP MVP, Offensive Player of the Year, and First-team All-Pro awards. He finished the season with a completion percentage of 70.62, establishing a new NFL record.

In the Divisional Round, Brees recorded 247 passing yards and three touchdowns as the Saints routed the Arizona Cardinals 45–14. In the NFC Championship, The Saints defeated the Minnesota Vikings 31–28 in overtime to help the Saints advance to their first Super Bowl appearance in franchise history. Brees completed 17 of 31 passes for 197 yards and three touchdowns. The Saints defeated the Indianapolis Colts 31–17 in Super Bowl XLIV on February 7, 2010. Brees tied a Super Bowl record with 32 pass completions and won the Super Bowl Most Valuable Player Award. He threw for 288 yards and two touchdowns. It was the first league championship in Saints franchise history. Brees was named the 2010 Sports Illustrated Sportsman of the Year, both for his winning the Super Bowl and his charitable work towards the reconstruction of New Orleans. On December 17, 2010, he was named AP Male Athlete of the Year. Within four short years after joining the Saints, Brees was more accurate in his throws than any of the Saints' past quarterbacks. Brees and his teammates were welcomed back to New Orleans with a blues band along with thousands of celebrating fans.

==== 2010 season ====
In the 2010 regular season, Brees passed for over 300 yards seven times and helped lead the Saints to a six-game winning streak late in the season after a 4–3 start. The Saints qualified for the playoffs with a 11–5 record, but were eliminated in the Wild Card Round by the Seattle Seahawks by a score of 41–36 in the Beast Quake game. Brees finished with 404 passing yards and two passing touchdowns in the loss. Brees was selected to his fifth Pro Bowl, which was his fourth with the Saints. Brees had a less successful season statistically, throwing a career-high 22 interceptions, tying the franchise record held by Aaron Brooks, although he managed to throw for 4,620 yards and 33 touchdowns. He was ranked ninth by his fellow players on the NFL Top 100 Players of 2011, the first edition of the players' ranking list.

==== 2011 season ====
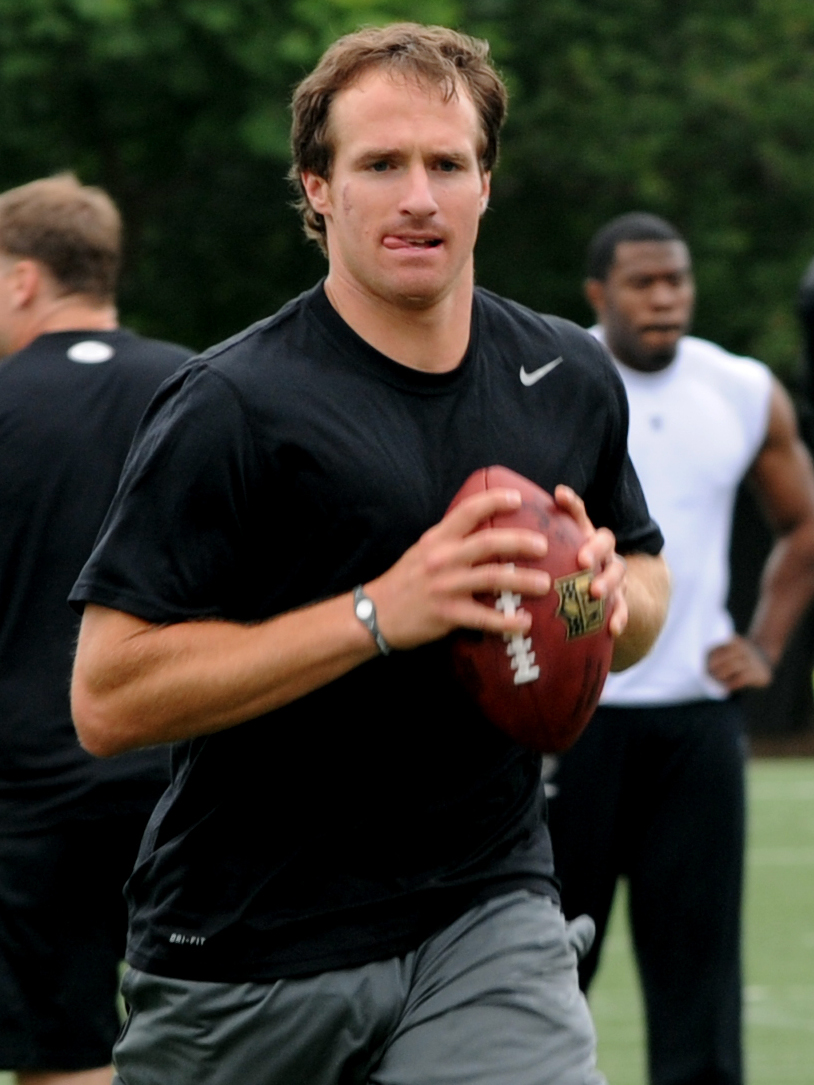
Brees practicing with the Saints in 2011.

The 2011 season was a record-breaking season for Brees as he led the NFL in completion percentage, passing yards and passing touchdowns, which is known as the "Triple Crown". He broke Dan Marino's 27-year-old record for most passing yards in one season (5,084) in the 15th game of the season (week 16) against the Atlanta Falcons at home in New Orleans at the Mercedes-Benz Superdome with a touchdown pass to Darren Sproles. Brees also set a new Saints franchise record for passing touchdowns in a season with 46.

In Week 2, during the Saints' home-opener, Brees defeated the Chicago Bears for the first time in his career as a starting quarterback, leaving the Baltimore Ravens as the only remaining NFL team which Brees had never beaten to that point. On October 23, in a 62–7 victory over the Indianapolis Colts, he was 31 of 35 for 325 passing yards and five touchdowns. He earned NFC Offensive Player of the Week for his performance against the Colts. On November 28, a Week 12 49–24 victory over the New York Giants, he had 363 passing yards and four touchdowns to earn NFC Offensive Player of the Week. In a home game on December 4 against the Detroit Lions, Brees passed for 342 yards. Brees's performance gave him 4,031 yards on the season, making him the first quarterback in NFL history to eclipse the 4,000-yard mark in the first 12 games of a season, and the first quarterback to reach four consecutive seasons with 4,000+ yards and 30+ touchdown passes. In Week 15, against the Minnesota Vikings, Brees threw for 412 yards with five passing touchdowns. With that game, Brees became the first quarterback in NFL history to throw for five touchdowns, 400+ yards, while also maintaining a completion percentage of 80%, in a game.

In Week 16, against the Atlanta Falcons at the Mercedes-Benz Superdome, Brees broke Dan Marino's longstanding record of passing yards in a single season of 5,084 with a nine-yard touchdown pass to Darren Sproles with just under three minutes left in the fourth quarter of the game. He needed 305 yards to break the record entering the game and exceeded that mark with 307. He ended the game having thrown for 5,087 total passing yards for the regular season with one game remaining. With his second-quarter, eight-yard touchdown pass to Marques Colston, Brees extended his streak of consecutive games with a touchdown pass to 42 games. Marino congratulated Brees via Twitter after the game, saying "Congrats to @drewbrees. Great job by such a special player." Brees responded by tweeting, "Thanks to @DanMarino for his class and support during this run. It is an honor to attempt to follow the example he set for us all." He earned his third and final NFC Offensive Player of the Week honor for the 2011 season with his performance against the Falcons.

In Week 17, against the Carolina Panthers, Brees closed out the season by setting six NFL records, finishing the year with 468 completions for 5,476 yards, edging out Tom Brady of the New England Patriots, who also surpassed Marino's record with 5,235 yards. He earned NFC Offensive Player of the Month for December to close out the season. Brees averaged 342.25 yards passing per game, which broke Dan Fouts's record of 320.3 in a strike-shortened 1982 season. In 2013, Peyton Manning bested Brees's record by one passing yard, and finished the season with an NFL-record 5,477 passing yards, averaging 342.31 yards per game. In the NFC Wild Card Round, Brees passed for 466 yards and three passing touchdowns as the Saints defeated the Detroit Lions by a score of 45–28. At the time, Brees's 466 passing yards marked the second-most in a playoff game in NFL history. He did set the NFL record for passing yards in a regulation playoff game. However, Brees and the Saints lost in the Divisional Round to the San Francisco 49ers by a score of 36–32 in a back-and-forth contest. In the loss, Brees passed for 462 passing yards, four passing touchdowns, and two interceptions. He was named to his sixth career Pro Bowl. He was ranked as the second-best player in the league by his peers on the NFL Top 100 Players of 2012.

==== 2012 season ====
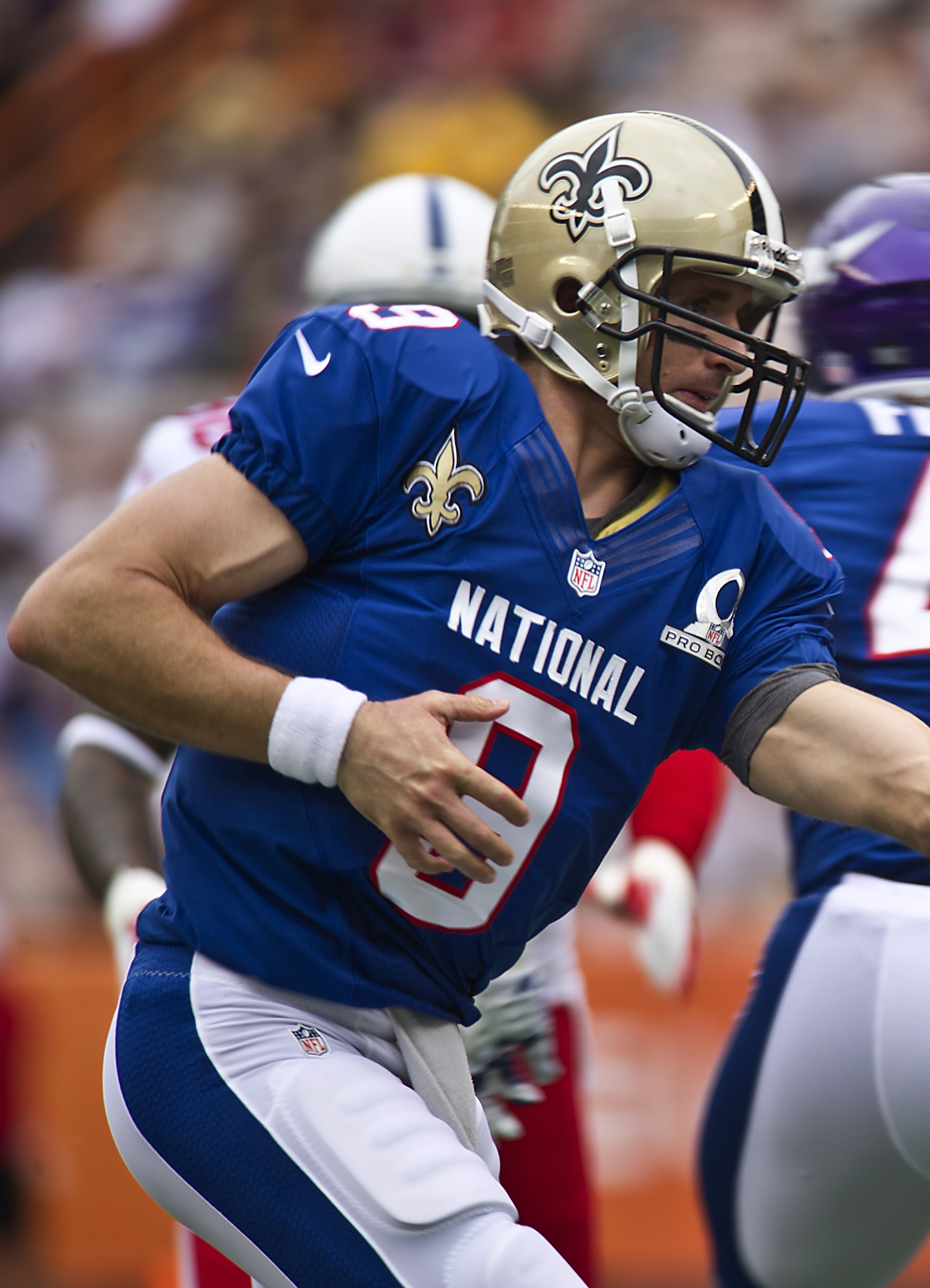
Brees at the 2013 Pro Bowl

On July 13, the Saints and Brees agreed to a five-year, $100 million contract. The contract included the largest amount of guaranteed money in NFL history, at $60 million. $40 million of the contract was paid the first year.

Due to the year-long suspension of head coach Sean Payton as a result of Bountygate, Brees entered the season with a temporary head coach in the form of offensive line coach Aaron Kromer, who was the Saints' coach for the first six games of the season while planned interim coach Joe Vitt was serving a suspension of his own. After Week 8, Vitt took over head coaching responsibilities for the rest of the 2012 season.

Brees and the Saints started the season with a 0–4 record. One highlight in that losing streak was in Week 4, when he passed for 446 yards and three touchdowns in a 28–27 loss to the Green Bay Packers. In Week 5, Brees threw a 40-yard touchdown pass to Devery Henderson against his former team, the San Diego Chargers. This was his 48th consecutive game with a touchdown pass. With that touchdown pass, Brees broke Johnny Unitas's consecutive game streak with a touchdown pass, and Unitas' son Joe was present at the Superdome to witness his father's 52-year-old record being broken. Sean Payton, Joe Vitt and Mickey Loomis, who were all serving suspensions due to the "Bountygate" scandal, were granted permission to watch the Week 5 game against the San Diego Chargers due to Brees potentially breaking Unitas' record. Brees earned NFC Offensive Player of the Week for his 370-yard, four-touchdown, and one-interception effort against the Chargers. Without their head coach, the Saints had lost their first four games but ended the losing streak with a 31–24 win over the Chargers.

In the Week 13 game against the Atlanta Falcons, Brees threw no touchdowns and a career-high five interceptions, ending his consecutive game streak with at least one touchdown pass at 54. In Week 14, against the New York Giants, Brees threw for 354 yards, giving him his seventh straight 4,000-yard passing season, surpassing Peyton Manning's mark. It was also his fifth straight season with at least 30 touchdown passes and 4,000 yards passing, also an NFL record. Brees finished the 2012 season with 5,177 passing yards and 43 touchdowns despite having the worst defensive support in the NFL, whose 7,042 yards conceded was an all-time NFL record, and the team finished the season with a 7–9 record and missed the playoffs. He was the first player to throw for 40 touchdowns and 5,000 yards on a team with a losing record.

For the seventh time, Brees was selected to the 2013 Pro Bowl, this time as an injury replacement for Robert Griffin III. He was ranked 11th by his peers on the NFL Top 100 Players of 2013.

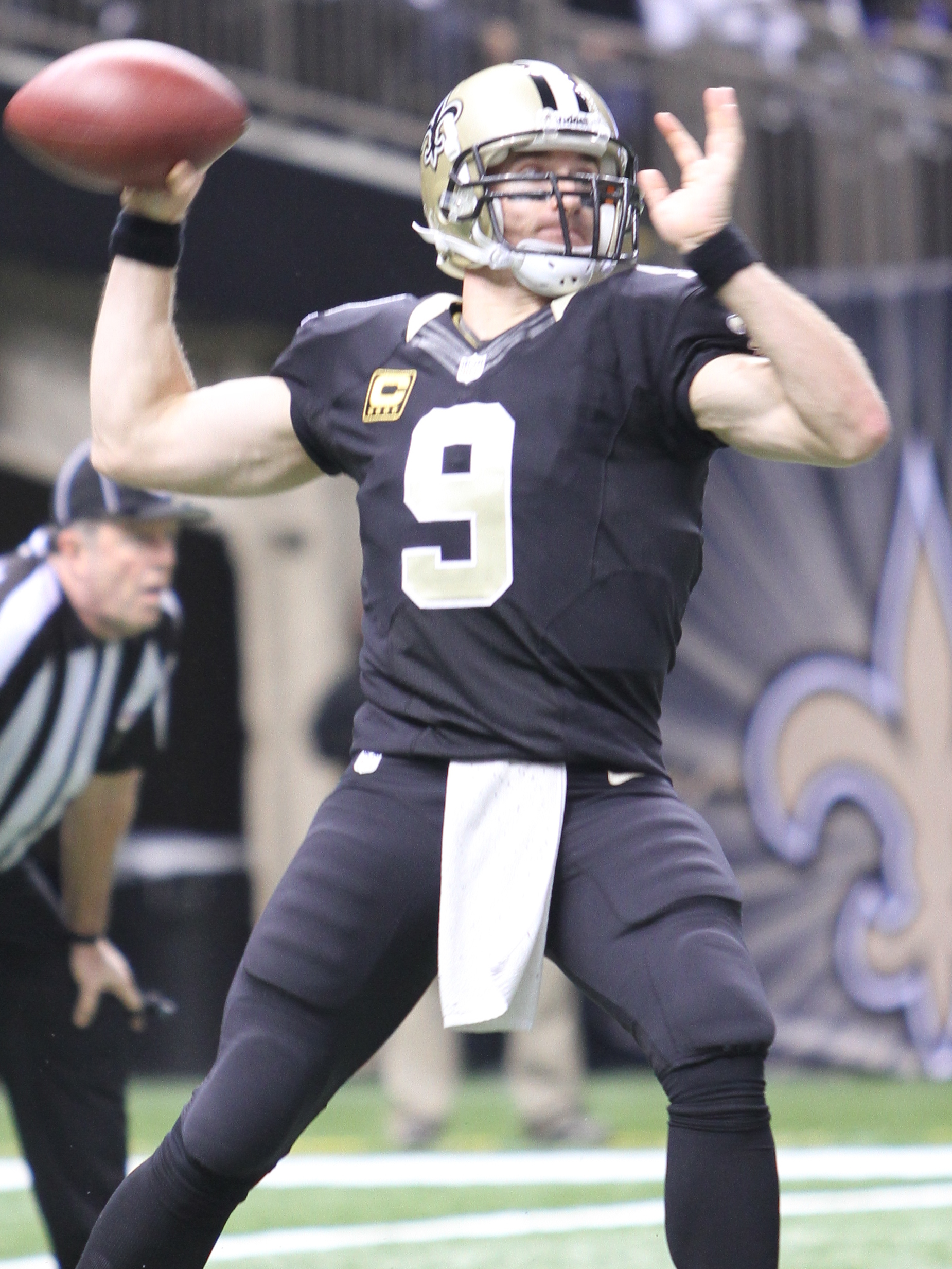
Brees in 2013.

==== 2013 season ====
Brees and the Saints started the 2013 season with a 5–0 record. In that stretch was a Week 4 38–17 home victory over the Miami Dolphins, where he had 413 passing yards and four touchdowns to earn NFC Offensive Player of the Week. In Week 10, a 49–17 victory over the Dallas Cowboys, he had 392 passing yards and four touchdowns to earn another NFC Offensive Player of the Week honor. In Week 12, Brees passed Warren Moon for fifth on the career passing yards list with 49,566. During Week 14, Brees became the fastest player ever to join the 50,000-yard club and only the fifth player to do so. He did it in 183 games, passing the 50,000 milestone on a pass to Jimmy Graham in the fourth quarter of a 31–13 Saints win over the Carolina Panthers on December 8, in which he threw four touchdowns. In Week 17, a 42–17 victory over the Tampa Bay Buccaneers, he had 381 passing yards and four touchdowns to earn his third NFC Offensive Player of the Week nod for the 2013 season. Brees also extended his NFL record to a sixth straight season of at least 30 touchdown passes with 4,000 passing yards, his third straight 5,000-yard season, and his eighth straight 4,000-yard season. For his successful performance in 2013, he was named to his eighth career Pro Bowl. The Saints finished with an 11–5 record and narrowly defeated the Philadelphia Eagles 26–24 in the Wild Card Round, but lost 23–15 to the Seattle Seahawks in the Divisional Round, who went on to win Super Bowl XLVIII.

Despite the loss to Seattle, of the Seahawks' three postseason opponents en route to their Super Bowl title, Brees was the only quarterback to not throw an interception against Seattle's vaunted Legion of Boom defense, while Colin Kaepernick and Peyton Manning each threw two interceptions in the NFC Championship Game and Super Bowl XLVIII respectively. The Saints also committed just one turnover against the Seahawks, compared to the San Francisco 49ers committing three in the NFC Title Game and the Denver Broncos turning it over four times in the Super Bowl. New Orleans also gained the most amount of total yards on offense with 409, with San Francisco and Denver recording 308 and 306 yards respectively, and also the greatest number of passing yards with 301, compared to the 49ers managing 147 yards through the air and the Broncos with 279 passing yards.

Brees finished ranked sixth by his fellow players on the NFL Top 100 Players of 2014.

==== 2014 season ====
Brees admits that the 2014 season was his "most frustrating". The Saints finished with a 7–9 record and missed the playoffs. Brees' 2014 season began with a pair of games lost on game-ending field goals by the other team; in Week 1, the Saints lost 37–34 on the road to the Atlanta Falcons in overtime and in Week 2, in a 26–24 road loss to the Cleveland Browns, he moved into fourth place on the career passing yardage list, ahead of John Elway. On October 19, in a road game against the Detroit Lions, Brees became the NFL's all-time leader in completion percentage at 66.21%, surpassing Chad Pennington. On November 30, in a Week 13 35–32 road victory over the Pittsburgh Steelers, he had 257 passing yards and five touchdowns to earn NFC Offensive Player of the Week, which was the 20th time in his career he has earned the award over his career in both the AFC with the Chargers and the NFC with the Saints. In a Week 15 road game against the Chicago Bears, he extended his streak to an NFL-record seventh straight season with at least 30 touchdown passes and nine straight seasons of 4,000 passing yards. However his streak of 5,000 passing yard seasons ended at three, as he passed for 4,952 yards, which was good enough to tie him with Steelers quarterback Ben Roethlisberger for the most passing yards in the league that season. The occurrence marked the first time in NFL history that two players tied for the passing yards lead. He was named to his seventh consecutive and ninth career Pro Bowl. He was ranked 30th by his fellow players on the NFL Top 100 Players of 2015.

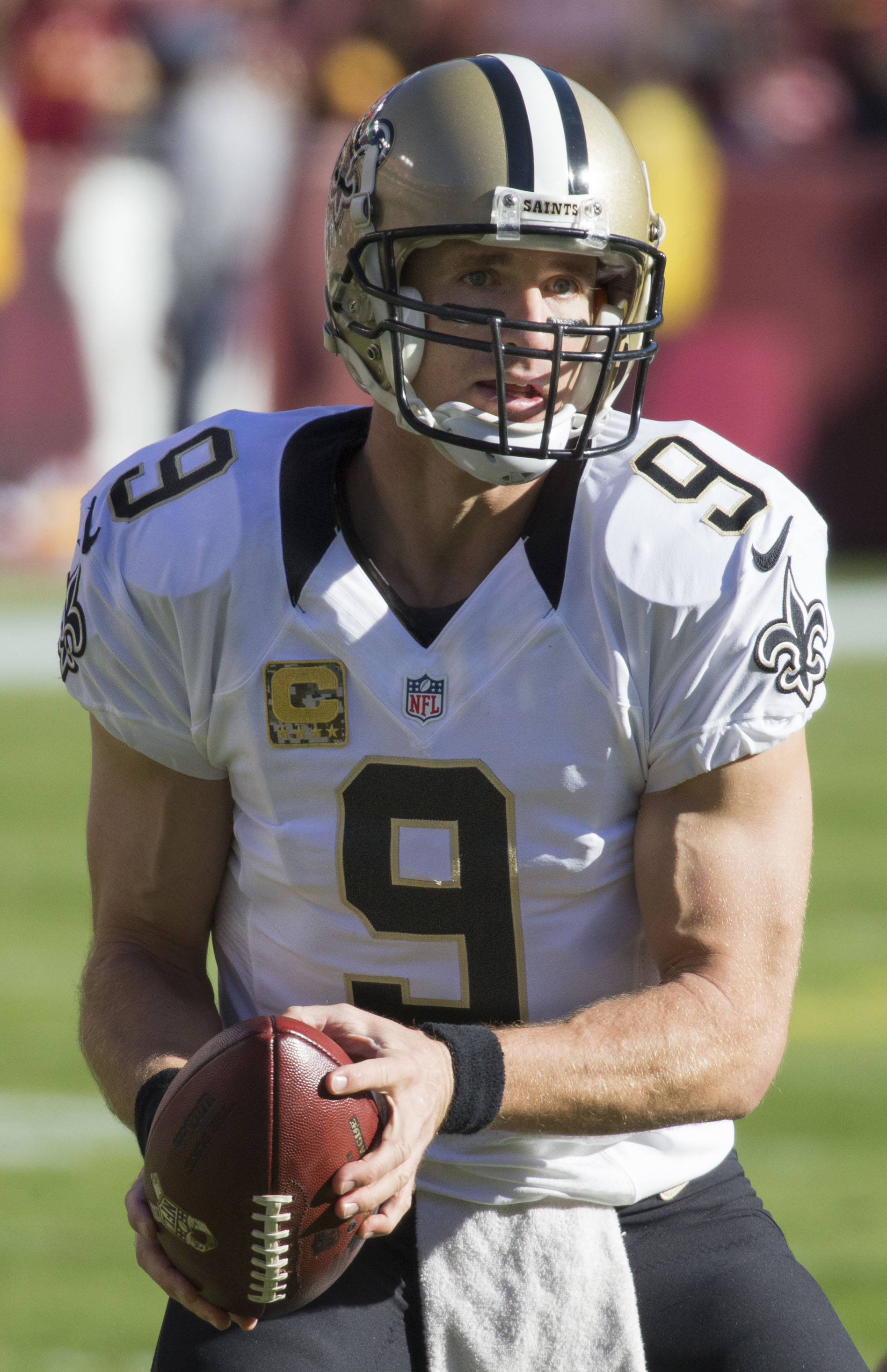
Brees in 2015 at Fedex Field

==== 2015 season ====
Brees and the Saints started the 2015 season with an 0–3 start with two of the losses being by one possession. On October 4, 2015, in Week 4, his 80-yard touchdown pass to C. J. Spiller on the second play of overtime gave the Saints a 26–20 victory over the Dallas Cowboys, and the team's first win of the season. He earned NFC Offensive Player of the Week for his effort against the Cowboys. The touchdown gave Brees 400 for his career, making him the fifth player in NFL history to reach the 400 touchdown milestone. Also, he became the fastest player ever to reach 400 touchdowns, doing so in 205 games. Brees also completed his 5,000th pass with a touchdown to tight end Josh Hill. It was the quickest regular season overtime win in the history of the NFL at 13 seconds.

On November 1, 2015, Brees tied the NFL record of touchdown passes in a game with seven during a 52–49 Saints win over the New York Giants. In that game, he completed 39-of-50 passes for 505 yards to record his second career game with at least 500 passing yards. He became the second player in NFL history to have multiple 500-yard passing games. He earned NFC Offensive Player of the Week for his historic performance against the New York Giants.

In Week 12, his streak of 45 consecutive games with a touchdown pass ended in a 24–6 loss at Houston. Two weeks later, he surpassed Dan Marino for fourth in career touchdown passes as the Saints beat the Tampa Bay Buccaneers by a score of 24–17. In Week 15, he became the fourth quarterback to reach the 60,000-yard milestone—in 215 games, the fastest ever—and had his 10th straight 4,000-yard season, plus his 94th 300-yard game, but the Detroit Lions won 35–27. This put him first in most 300-yard games as Brees and Manning had been tied at 93 games prior to that game. A week later, his streak was extended to an eighth straight season with at least 30 touchdown passes, plus his 95th 300-yarder, all NFL records, against the Jacksonville Jaguars. With a Week 17 win over the Atlanta Falcons, Brees finished the season with four straight 300-yard games, for a career record total of 96, and a season total 4,870 yards passing, leading the league in passing yards for a record sixth time despite missing one game due to an injury. Despite the accomplishments on the field, the Saints finished with a 7–9 record and missed the playoffs. He was ranked 30th by his fellow players on the NFL Top 100 Players of 2016.

==== 2016 season ====
External videos
- Video of Brees throwing an 87-yard touchdown pass to Brandin Cooks on YouTube

In the Saints' 2016 season opener, Brees threw a career-high 98-yard touchdown pass to Brandin Cooks in a narrow 35–34 home loss to the Oakland Raiders. He finished the game 28–of–42 for 423 yards and four touchdown passes. His 400-yard performance tied him with Peyton Manning for the most 400-yard passing games in NFL history. The next week, he passed Dan Marino for third place in career passing yards in a loss to the New York Giants.

On October 16, in Week 6, Brees threw for 465 yards and four touchdown passes with one interception in a 41–38 home win over the Carolina Panthers. With this performance, Brees set an NFL record with the 15th 400-yard passing performance of his career. Brees reached another milestone in the game, becoming the sixth player to record 50,000 passing yards with one team. The other five players are Peyton Manning (Indianapolis Colts), Brett Favre (Green Bay Packers), Dan Marino (Miami Dolphins), Tom Brady (New England Patriots), and John Elway (Denver Broncos).

In Week 7, Brees became the first player in NFL history with 100 games of 300+ passing yards, in a loss against the Kansas City Chiefs on October 23.

During Week 16, Brees and Aaron Rodgers tied the NFL record for most seasons with at least 35 touchdown passes with four—a record shared with Peyton Manning and Tom Brady.

Brees finished the 2016 season leading the league in passing yards with 5,208, the second most of his career and the fifth 5,000-yard season of his career—more than all other 5,000-yard seasons combined (4). He threw for 471 completions, breaking his NFL record of 468 set in 2011, and a career-high 673 attempts. Brees finished third in touchdown passes with 37, the fourth most of his career. He finished second in completion percentage (70.0%), making it the third time he has completed at least 70% of his passes in a season. (Note: Brees completed 69.985% of his passes during the 2016 season, which was rounded up to 70%.) Despite his performance, for the third straight season, the Saints finished 7–9 and missed the playoffs. He was named to his tenth career Pro Bowl for his 2016 season. He was ranked 16th by his peers on the NFL Top 100 Players of 2017.

==== 2017 season ====
Brees and the Saints started the 2017 season with a 0–2 record before winning eight consecutive games. In Week 13, he passed Peyton Manning for second place in career completions in a 31–21 victory over the Carolina Panthers. On December 19, 2017, Brees was named to his 11th career Pro Bowl. During Week 16 against the Atlanta Falcons, Brees became the third player to amass over 70,000 passing yards in a career, doing so in an NFL fastest 248 games. In that game, he earned his 12th consecutive 4,000-yard season as the Saints won 23–13. Brees finished the 2017 season by setting a then-NFL record 72.0 completion percentage. He led the league in number of completions (386) and yards per pass attempt (8.1), and finished second in passer rating (103.9).

The Saints finished with an 11–5 record, won the NFC South, and returned to the playoffs for the first time since the 2013 season. In the Wild Card Round against the Carolina Panthers, he had 376 passing yards, two touchdowns, and one interception in the 31–26 victory. In the Divisional Round against the Minnesota Vikings, he had 294 passing yards, three touchdowns, and two interceptions in the 29–24 loss. He was ranked eighth by his fellow players on the NFL Top 100 Players of 2018.

==== 2018 season ====
On March 13, 2018, Brees signed a two-year, $50 million contract extension with the Saints with $27 million guaranteed.

In Week 1, Brees threw for more than 400 yards for a record 16th time in his career, but the Tampa Bay Buccaneers won 48–40. In Week 3, against the Atlanta Falcons, Brees broke Brett Favre's record for career pass completions in the second quarter with his 6,301st career completion. In that game, a 43–37 overtime Saints victory, Brees threw for 396 yards and three touchdowns, and also ran for two more scores, including the game-winner in overtime, earning him NFC Offensive Player of the Week. In Week 5 against the Washington Redskins, Brees surpassed Peyton Manning for the NFL's all-time passing yardage record with a 62-yard touchdown pass to Tre'Quan Smith late in the second quarter. He went on to complete 26 of 29 passes, setting a then career-high 89.66 single-game completion percentage, for 363 yards and three touchdowns in the 43–19 victory, earning him NFC Offensive Player of the Week for the second time in three weeks. After breaking the passing yards record, Brees sent a personalized football and letter to those players that helped him reach the milestone.

Following a bye week, Brees claimed his first career victory against the Baltimore Ravens with a score of 24–23, making him the third quarterback in NFL history to beat all 32 teams, joining Peyton Manning and Brett Favre. During this game, Brees also became the fourth quarterback in NFL history, along with Manning, Favre, and Tom Brady, to reach 500 career touchdown passes when he threw a 1-yard touchdown to Benjamin Watson. After a season-low 120 yards and his first interception of the season in a win over the Minnesota Vikings, Brees logged 346 yards, four touchdowns, and zero interceptions to hand the Rams their first loss of the season in Week 9. In a Week 10 matchup against the Cincinnati Bengals, Brees passed Brett Favre for second in career passing touchdowns with a 17-yard touchdown to Michael Thomas in a 51–14 victory. Brees was named the NFC Offensive Player of the Month for November passing for 16 touchdowns to two interceptions in that stretch.

Brees finished the season with 364 completions, 489 attempts, 3,992 passing yards, 32 passing touchdowns and five interceptions over 15 games. He sat out the season finale after the Saints had clinched the NFC's #1 seed the week prior. He set an NFL record for completion percentage (74.4%), breaking his previous record (72.0%) set in 2017, and led the league in passer rating (a career high of 115.7). However, with his 3,992 yards, his NFL record streak of 12 consecutive seasons with at least 4,000 passing yards came to an end. He led the league with six fourth quarter comebacks and seven game-winning drives.

In the Divisional Round against the Philadelphia Eagles, the Saints started badly, quickly falling into a 14–0 hole, but recovered and scored 20 unanswered points over the final three quarters to win and advance to their first NFC Championship Game since their 2009 Super Bowl winning season. Brees completed 28 of 38 passes for 301 yards, two touchdowns, and one interception in the win. In the NFC Championship, Brees passed for 249 yards, two touchdowns, and one interception as the Saints lost 26–23 in overtime to the Los Angeles Rams following a controversial missed pass interference call on a play that started at the Rams' 13-yard line with 1:49 left in regulation. If called, the penalty could have allowed the Saints to run out most of the clock, due to the Rams having only one timeout remaining, and try a go-ahead field goal that would have likely won the game for New Orleans. Brees became the first and only player in NFL history to throw touchdown passes to 15 different players (of which nine were undrafted) in a single season, including the playoffs. He finished second in the MVP voting to Patrick Mahomes. He was ranked as the second best player in the NFL by his peers on the NFL Top 100 Players of 2019.

==== 2019 season ====
In the first game of the season against the Houston Texans, Brees threw for 370 yards, two touchdowns, and one interception as the Saints overcame a slow start to win 30–28. In the Saints' Week 2 game against the Los Angeles Rams, Brees suffered an injury to his right hand on a hit from Aaron Donald which forced him out of the game. The next day, an MRI revealed that Brees had suffered a torn ligament in the thumb of his right hand, which would require surgery and reportedly cause him to miss six to eight weeks. Brees returned in Week 8 against the Arizona Cardinals, finishing with 373 passing yards, three touchdowns, and an interception as the Saints won 31–9. In Week 14, against the San Francisco 49ers, Brees completed 29 of 40 passes for 349 yards, five touchdowns and no interceptions and scored a one-yard rushing touchdown, but his efforts were in vain as the Saints narrowly lost 48–46. During Week 15 against the Indianapolis Colts, Brees broke former Colts quarterback Peyton Manning's record for most career touchdowns, throwing his 540th to tight end Josh Hill on his career-best 20th straight completion in the third quarter. Brees's record-breaking touchdown pass was his third touchdown pass on the night. He finished the game with four touchdowns and 304 yards as the Saints defeated the Colts by a 34–7 score. In addition, Brees completed 29 of his 30 pass attempts for a career high and NFL single game record 96.7% completion percentage rate, surpassing the previous record (28 out of 29 passes for a 96.6% completion percentage rate) which had been set the previous year by his former Chargers teammate Philip Rivers. In the following week's game against the Tennessee Titans, Brees threw for 279 yards and three touchdowns during the 38–28 win. During the game, Brees helped wide receiver Michael Thomas break the single season receptions record formerly held by Marvin Harrison with his 144th catch of the season. Brees earned NFC Offensive Player of the Month for December. In the 2019 season, Brees appeared in 11 games and finished with 2,979 passing yards, 27 touchdowns, and four interceptions. He finished with a completion percentage of 74.34%, which finished second in NFL history to his record from the previous season. In his matchups against the Falcons, he would also set the record for most matchups against a starting quarterback in the Super Bowl era, with 23 against Matt Ryan.

In the Wild Card Round against the Minnesota Vikings, Brees threw for 208 yards, one touchdown, and one interception during the 26–20 overtime loss. In the game, Brees helped lead the Saints on a late drive to set up a game-tying field goal on a seven-play drive to force the overtime period. He earned his 13th career Pro Bowl nomination after Russell Wilson gave up his spot. He was ranked 12th by his fellow players on the NFL Top 100 Players of 2020.

==== 2020 season ====
On March 17, 2020, Brees signed a two-year, $50 million contract extension with the Saints.

In the Saints' regular-season opener against the Tampa Bay Buccaneers and their new quarterback Tom Brady, Brees completed 18 of 30 passes for 160 passing yards and two touchdowns, breaking Brett Favre's record for most career pass attempts in the process, as the Saints won by a score of 34–23. Following the Week 1 victory, Brees helped lead the Saints to a 5–2 stretch leading into a second matchup with Brady in Week 9. Against the Tampa Bay Buccaneers, he passed for 222 yards and four touchdowns in the 38–3 victory. With the win over the Buccaneers, Brees defeated Brady head-to-head for the second time.

On November 15, 2020, Brees left the Saints’ Week 10 game against the San Francisco 49ers following the first half with a rib injury suffered on a sack attempt from Kentavius Street. Brees completed 8 of 13 passes for 76 yards and a touchdown before leaving the game. The next day, it was revealed Brees had suffered multiple broken ribs and a collapsed lung from the hits he had taken during the game. On November 20, 2020, Brees was placed on injured reserve, thereby ruling him out for at least the following three games. After missing four games, Brees was activated on December 19, 2020, for the Saints' Week 15 game against the Kansas City Chiefs and threw for 234 yards, three touchdowns and one interception; during the Saints' 32–29 loss, Brees surpassed former Canadian Football League (CFL) quarterback Anthony Calvillo for first place in career passing yards in any professional outdoor gridiron football league. During the Saints' next game against the Minnesota Vikings on Christmas Day, Brees became the first quarterback in history to record 80,000 career passing yards as New Orleans won 52–33 to clinch a fourth straight NFC South title. Overall, he finished the 2020 season with 2,942 passing yards, 24 touchdowns, and six interceptions in twelve games with the Saints finishing with a 12–4 record.

In the Wild Card Round against the Chicago Bears, Brees threw for 265 yards and two touchdowns during the 21–9 win. In the Divisional Round against the Tampa Bay Buccaneers, Brees threw for 134 yards and a touchdown but also threw three interceptions in a 30–20 loss to eventual Super Bowl LV champions in what would turn out to be Brees' final game played in the NFL.

On February 6, 2021, the Saints renegotiated Brees' contract, which reduced his salary down to $1.075 million for the upcoming season to save salary cap space. On March 14, 2021, exactly 15 years to the day that Brees signed his first contract with the New Orleans Saints, Brees announced his retirement after twenty seasons. The Saints placed him on their reserve/retired list on June 11, 2021.

== Career statistics ==
Legend
	AP NFL Offensive Player of the Year
	Super Bowl MVP
	Won the Super Bowl
	NFL record
	Led the league
**Bold**	Career high

=== NFL ===
==== Regular season ====
Year	Team	Games			Passing										Rushing					Sacked		Fumbles (Note: Fumbles lost data taken from Pro Football Reference career game log)	
Year	Team	GP	GS	Record	Cmp	Att	Pct	Yds	Y/A	Y/G	Lng	TD	Int	Rtg	Att	Yds	Y/A	Lng	TD	Sck	SckY	Fum	Lost
2001	SD	1	0	—	15	27	55.6	221	8.2	221.0	40	1	0	94.8	2	18	**9.0**	13	0	2	12	2	0
2002	SD	16	16	8–8	320	526	60.8	3,284	6.2	205.3	52	17	16	76.9	38	**130**	3.4	15	1	24	180	2	0
2003	SD	11	11	2–9	205	356	57.6	2,108	5.9	191.6	68	11	15	67.5	21	84	4.0	18	0	21	178	5	3
2004	SD	15	15	11–4	262	400	65.5	3,159	7.9	210.6	79	27	7	104.8	35	85	1.6	**22**	2	18	131	7	2
2005	SD	16	16	9–7	323	500	64.6	3,576	7.2	223.5	54	24	15	89.2	21	49	2.3	9	1	27	223	8	5
2006	NO	16	16	10–6	356	554	64.3	4,418	8.0	276.1	86	26	11	96.2	**42**	32	0.8	16	0	18	105	8	2
2007	NO	16	16	7–9	440	652	67.5	4,423	6.8	276.4	58	28	18	89.4	23	52	2.3	9	1	16	109	9	4
2008	NO	16	16	8–8	413	635	65.0	5,069	8.0	316.8	84	34	17	96.2	23	−1	0.0	9	0	13	92	6	1
2009	NO	15	15	**13–2**	363	514	70.6	4,388	**8.5**	292.5	75	34	11	109.6	22	33	1.5	10	2	20	135	**10**	**6**
2010	NO	16	16	11–5	448	658	68.1	4,620	7.0	288.8	80	33	**22**	90.9	18	−3	−0.2	7	0	25	185	9	2
2011	NO	16	16	13–3	468	657	71.2	**5,476**	8.3	**342.3**	79	**46**	14	110.6	21	86	4.1	20	1	24	158	1	1
2012	NO	16	16	7–9	422	670	63.0	5,177	7.7	323.6	80	43	19	96.3	15	5	0.3	11	1	26	190	5	1
2013	NO	16	16	11–5	446	650	68.6	5,162	7.9	322.6	76	39	12	104.7	35	52	1.5	16	3	**37**	**244**	6	2
2014	NO	16	16	7–9	456	659	69.2	4,952	7.5	309.5	69	33	17	97.0	27	68	2.5	13	1	29	186	7	3
2015	NO	15	15	7–8	428	627	68.3	4,870	7.8	324.7	80	32	11	101.0	24	14	0.6	12	1	31	235	5	2
2016	NO	16	16	7–9	**471**	**673**	70.0	5,208	7.7	325.5	**98**	37	15	101.7	23	20	0.9	7	2	27	184	5	4
2017	NO	16	16	11–5	386	536	72.0	4,334	8.1	270.9	54	23	8	103.9	33	12	0.4	7	2	20	145	5	0
2018	NO	15	15	**13–2**	364	489	**74.4**	3,992	8.2	266.1	72	32	5	115.7	31	22	0.7	11	**4**	17	121	5	1
2019	NO	11	11	8–3	281	378	74.3	2,979	7.9	270.8	61	27	4	**116.3**	9	−4	−0.4	2	1	12	89	0	0
2020	NO	12	12	9–3	275	390	70.5	2,942	7.5	245.2	52	24	6	106.4	18	−2	−0.1	3	2	13	89	6	2
Career		287	286	172–114	7,142	10,551	67.7	80,358	7.6	280.0	98	571	243	98.7	498	752	1.5	22	25	420	2,991	111	41

==== Postseason ====
Year	Team	Games			Passing										Rushing					Sacked		Fumbles	
Year	Team	GP	GS	Record	Cmp	Att	Pct	Yds	Y/A	Y/G	Lng	TD	Int	Rtg	Att	Yds	Y/A	Lng	TD	Sck	SckY	Fum	Lost
2004	SD	1	1	0–1	31	42	73.8	319	7.6	319.0	44	2	1	101.2	**5**	**17**	3.4	7	0	2	11	1	0
2006	NO	2	2	1–1	47	81	58.0	597	7.4	298.5	**88**	3	1	88.3	4	6	1.5	**8**	0	**6**	**51**	**3**	**2**
2009	NO	3	3	**3–0**	72	102	70.6	732	7.2	244.0	44	**8**	0	**117.0**	**5**	−4	−0.8	0	0	2	15	2	0
2010	NO	1	1	0–1	39	60	65.0	404	6.7	404.0	40	2	0	95.4	2	6	3.0	6	0	1	7	1	0
2011	NO	2	2	1–1	**73**	**106**	68.9	**928**	8.8	**464.0**	66	7	2	110.1	**5**	4	0.8	5	0	5	34	1	1
2013	NO	2	2	1–1	44	73	60.3	559	7.7	279.5	52	2	2	81.9	**5**	13	2.6	5	0	3	9	1	0
2017	NO	2	2	1–1	48	73	65.8	670	**9.2**	335.0	80	5	**3**	100.8	3	0	0.0	2	0	3	23	1	0
2018	NO	2	2	1–1	54	78	69.2	550	7.2	275.0	43	4	2	95.6	**5**	−2	−0.4	1	0	4	25	2	0
2019	NO	1	1	0–1	26	33	**78.8**	208	6.3	208.0	20	1	1	90.4	1	5	5.0	5	0	3	31	1	1
2020	NO	2	2	1–1	47	73	64.4	399	5.5	199.5	38	3	**3**	75.1	**5**	5	1.0	2	0	0	0	1	0
Career		18	18	9–9	481	721	66.7	5,366	7.4	298.1	88	37	15	97.1	40	50	1.3	8	0	29	206	14	4

=== College ===
Year	Team	GP	Passing					
Year	Team	GP	Cmp	Att	Pct	Yds	TD	Int
1997	Purdue	8	19	43	44.2	232	0	1
1998	Purdue	13	**361**	**569**	**63.4**	**3,983**	**39**	**20**
1999	Purdue	12	337	554	60.8	3,909	25	12
2000	Purdue	12	309	512	60.4	3,668	26	12
Total		45	1,026	1,678	61.1	11,792	90	45

== Career highlights ==
=== Awards and honors ===
NFL

- Super Bowl champion (XLIV)
- Super Bowl MVP (XLIV)
- NFC champion (2009)
- 7× NFL passing yards leader (2006, 2008, 2011, 2012, 2014–2016)
- 4× NFL passing touchdowns leader (2008, 2009, 2011, 2012)
- 2× NFL passer rating leader (2009, 2018)
- 6× NFL completion percentage leader (2009–2011, 2017–2019)
- Total quarterback rating leader: (2009)
- 13× Pro Bowl (2004, 2006, 2008–2014, 2016–2019)
- 25× AFC/NFC Offensive Player of the Week
- 5× NFC Offensive Player of the Month
- 4× FedEx Air Player of the Year (2006, 2008, 2009, 2011)
- 10× NFL Top 100 — 9th (2011), 2nd (2012), 11tg (2013), 6th (2014), 30th (2015), 30th (2016), 16th (2017), 8th (2018), 2nd (2019), 12th (2020)
- First-team All-Pro (2006)
- 4× Second-team All-Pro (2008, 2009, 2011, 2018)
- 2× NFL Offensive Player of the Year (2008, 2011)
- 2× Sporting News Offensive Player of the Year (2008, 2009)
- Sports Illustrated Sportsman of the Year (2010)
- Associated Press Male Athlete of the Year (2010)
- Bert Bell Award (2009)
- Bart Starr Award (2011)
- Art Rooney Award (2018)
- NFLPA Alan Page Community Award (2012)
- PFWA Good Guy Award (2010)
- George Halas Award (2007)
- Walter Payton NFL Man of the Year (2006)
- NFL Comeback Player of the Year (2004)
- Pro Football Hall of Fame (2026)

College

- Maxwell Award (2000)
- 2× Third-team All-American (1999, 2000)
- Big Ten Most Valuable Player (2000)
- 2× Big Ten Offensive Player of the Year (1998, (Note: Co-winner this season alongside Joe Germaine.) 2000)
- 2× First-team All-Big Ten (1999, 2000)
- Second-team All-Big Ten (1998)

=== Records ===
==== National Football League records ====
- Most passing touchdowns, single game (7) (tied with 7 others)
- Best pass completion percentage, single season (74.4% in 2018)
- Most 5,000 yard seasons: 5
- Most consecutive games with a touchdown pass: 54
- Most seasons leading the league in pass completions: 6, 2007–2008, 2011, 2014, 2016–2017, (tied with Dan Marino)
- Most seasons as passing yards leader: 7
- Yards per game in a single season: 342.3 (2013) (tied with Peyton Manning)
- Most pass completions per game, season: 29.4, (2016)

==== New Orleans Saints franchise records ====
Brees holds numerous passing records for the Saints franchise:

- Passing yards, career (68,010)
- Passing yards, single game (510)
- Passing touchdowns, career (491)
- Pass completions, career (6,017)
- Pass completions, single game (39) – Brees accomplished the 39 completions in four total games
- Pass attempts, career (8,742)
- Pass attempts, single game (60)
- Passing yards, single season (5,476) (2011)
- Passing touchdowns, single season (46) (2011)
- Pass completions, single season (471) (2016)
- Pass attempts, single season (673) (2016)
- Longest pass-play, (98 yards) (2016)
- Completion percentage, single season (74.4%)
- Completion percentage, career (67.7%)

== Broadcasting career ==
Following his retirement from the NFL, Brees was hired by NBC Sports in 2021 to serve as the color analyst for the network's Notre Dame games and on Football Night in America, working in the booth alongside play-by-play announcer Mike Tirico. He left after the season on May 15, 2022.

In September 2025, Brees signed with ESPN's First Take as a weekly contributor.

In November 2025, Fox hired Brees to be an NFL game analyst. The move coincided with the firing of Mark Sanchez for his role in an Indianapolis incident leading to his stabbing and subsequent arrest the previous month. Brees also worked for Netflix on its Christmas Day broadcast. In 2026, he was elevated by Fox to the booth as Adam Amin's color commentator.

== Personal life ==
Brees married his college sweetheart Brittany Dudchenko in February 2003. The couple have four children together: three sons born January 2009, October 2010, and August 2012, and a daughter in August 2014.

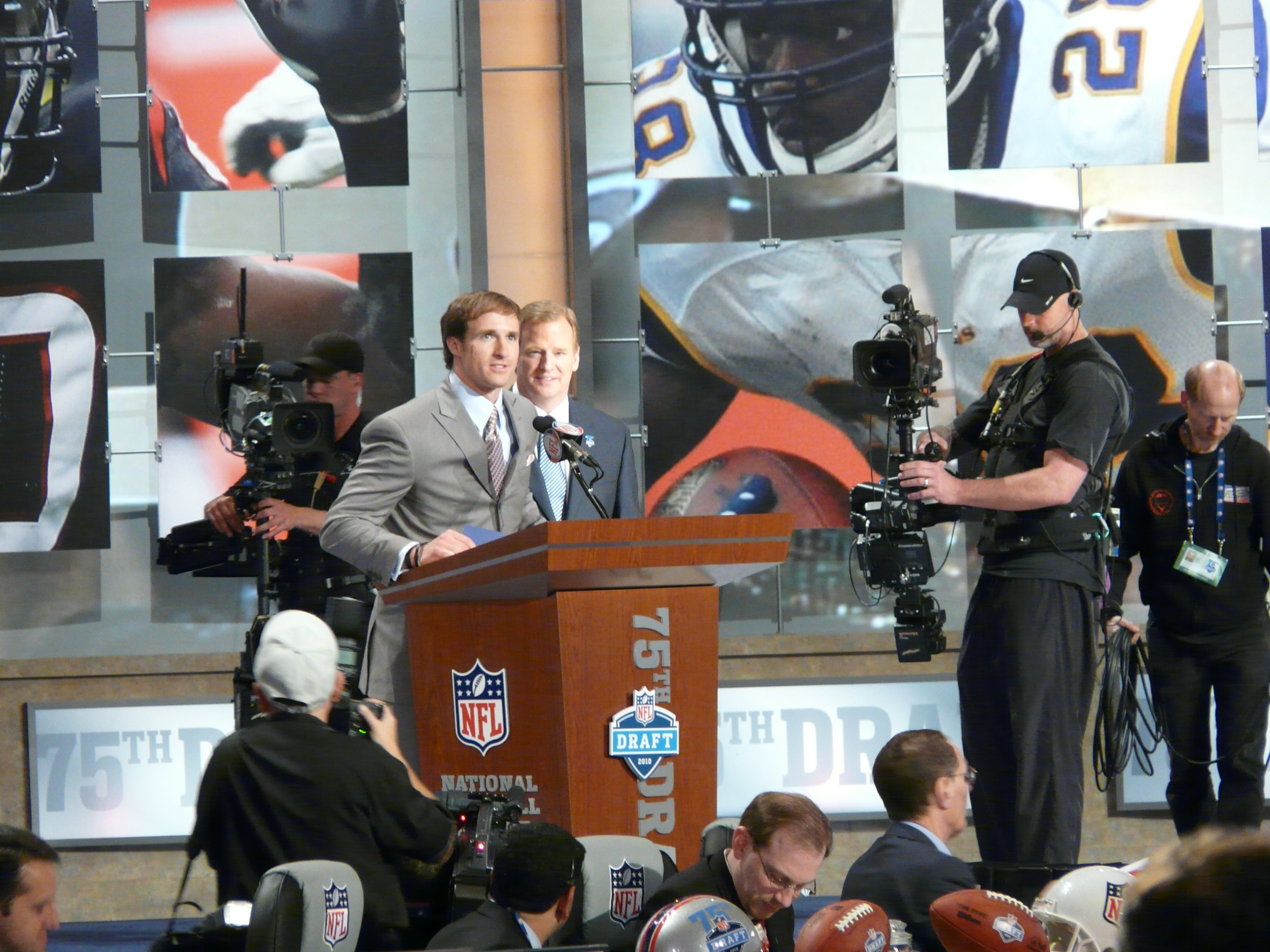
Brees announcing the Saints' draft pick at the 2010 NFL draft

Brees moved to New Orleans not long after the devastation of Hurricane Katrina. He admitted that it was challenging moving to a city that was still recovering from the hurricane; however, he and Brittany immediately fell in love with the culture and "soul" of the city. They purchased and renovated a home in Uptown New Orleans, where they still live. Brees admits in an interview that he thinks his family is now completed especially because three boys and one girl were always the couple's dream. All four children were born in New Orleans and are being raised there. The four priorities in Brees's life are faith, family, football, and philanthropy; otherwise known as the "four F's" by Brees. Brees kept a home in San Diego until he sold the property in 2012.

Brees is a Baptist. Brees was raised as a Christian but stated that he became committed at age 17 when he was at church with a torn ACL and was wondering who he was and what his purpose was in life. Brees later faced other trials such as tearing the labrum in his shoulder in 2005; however, he maintains that these setbacks only strengthened his relationship with God.

A birthmark on the right side of his face led to bullying when he was younger.

Throughout his youth, Brees attended Camp Champions, a co-ed summer camp in Marble Falls, Texas, for eight summers. Brees was twice voted "Most Outstanding Camper" by his peers during his tenure at the camp.

On July 6, 2010, Brees released his first book, entitled Coming Back Stronger: Unleashing the Hidden Power of Adversity, co-authored by Chris Fabry. Coming Back Stronger opened at number 3 on the nonfiction bestseller list of The New York Times.

In 2010, Brees appeared in the Season 7 finale of Entourage.

Brees's mother, Mina Brees, died on August 7, 2009, at age 59, from a prescription drug overdose. The death was ruled a suicide. Brees was briefly excused from training camp for a "family matter". In 2006, Brees described their relationship as "nonexistent" ever since he refused to hire his mother as his agent when he entered the NFL, saying that she undercut his dealings with other agents and tried to sell a book about him to Sports Illustrated without his knowledge, and later that year he told her to stop using his picture in TV commercials during her campaign for the Texas 3rd Court of Appeals. After her death, Brees stated that this quote was three years old and that his relationship with his mother had been improving. In his autobiography, released almost a year later, he wrote that their relationship had been on the mend and that she had been looking forward to meeting his son, her first grandchild.

In April 2010, Brees was voted by fans as the cover athlete of EA Sports Madden NFL 11 video game.

Brees wears #9 on his uniform in honor of late baseball player Ted Williams.

Brees is sometimes known by the nicknames "Breesus" by Saints fans and "Cool Brees", which he acquired during his younger years for his calmness under pressure.

On March 30, 2010, Brees became the national spokesperson for AdvoCare International, a multi-level marketing company, which produces weight management, nutritional supplement, and personal care products.

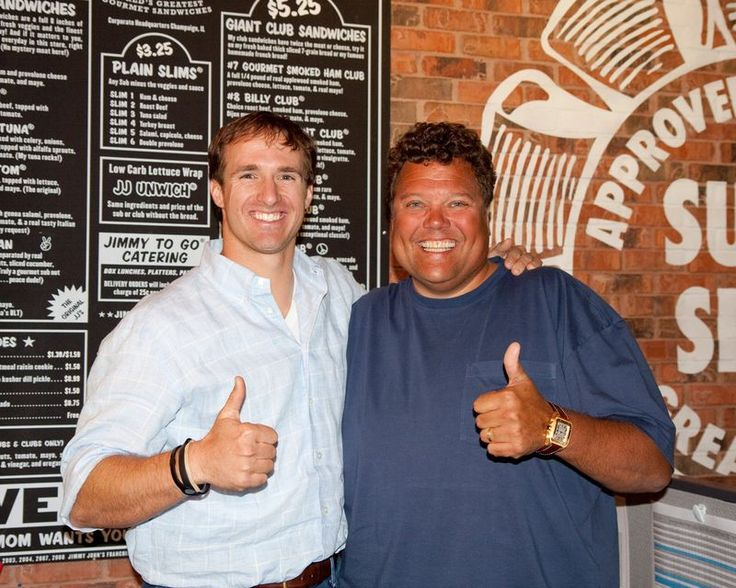
Brees with Jimmy John's founder and chairman Jimmy John Liautaud in 2017.

Brees owns a variety of restaurant businesses. In May 2015, he purchased a 25% stake in "Walk-On's Bistreaux & Bar", a sports bar that originated in Baton Rouge and is currently expanding their franchising into other Gulf Coast states. In 2019, he opened a Walk-On's restaurant in Midland, Texas. During initial talks with Walk-On's, Brees said that he was interested in bringing over some of the lessons that he had learned as a Jimmy John's franchise owner. He currently owns nine Jimmy John's stores with a tenth under construction as of August 2019. Carl Buergler, Jimmy John's director of operations, played football at Purdue with Brees.

Brees utilizes former Major League Baseball player and coach Tom House as his mechanics coach.

In 2019, Brees partnered with San Diego Surf Sports to help with the local youth sports scene in the San Diego area.

Brees follows a strict diet, avoiding gluten, dairy, and nuts due to food allergies. He also has a regimented daily exercise routine, focusing on core strength exercises rather than heavy weight training.

In 2026, Brees endorsed incumbent Louisiana senator Bill Cassidy in his bid for reelection.

On June 3, 2020, during the George Floyd protests, Brees told Yahoo Finance that he stood by his 2016 opinion that kneeling during the national anthem was disrespectful to the flag and to the US. Several of his teammates and other professional athletes expressed disappointment and anger at the statement. He apologized early the next day.

In 2023, Brees revealed that he was unable to lift any part of his right arm over his shoulder anymore. He said that the condition is a result of the shoulder injury he suffered during his time with the Chargers.

== Charity and volunteer activities ==
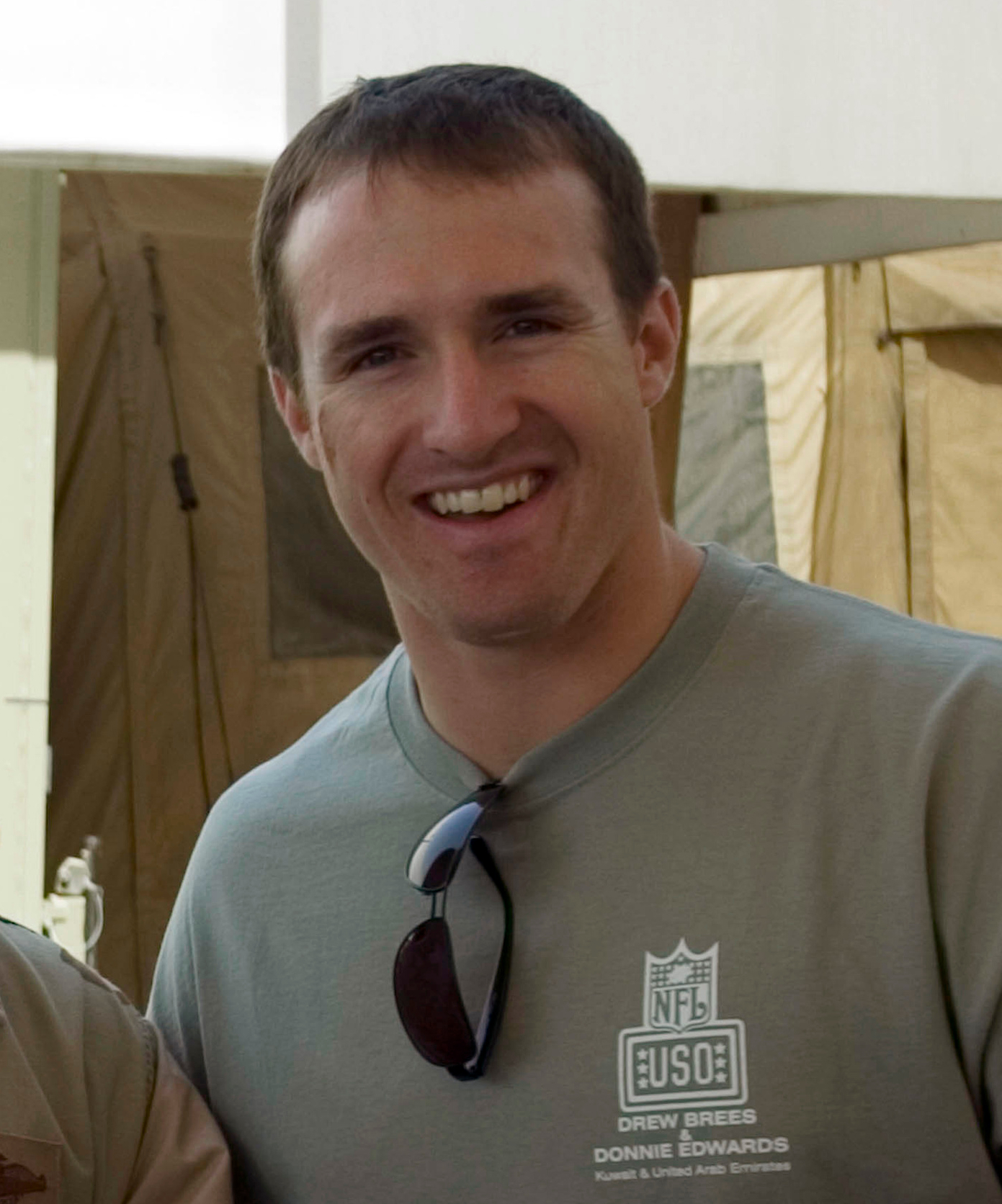
Brees visiting U.S. soldiers in Kuwait, April 2007

In 2010, Sports Illustrated described Brees as "an athlete as adored and appreciated as any in an American city today". When Sports Illustrated selected him for the 2010 Sportsman of the Year award, it said the award was "[f]or not only leading the New Orleans Saints to the first Super Bowl title in the franchise's history, but also for helping lead the city of New Orleans' rebirth after the tragedy of Hurricane Katrina". The fact that he and his family lived in New Orleans proper, instead of the suburbs like many players did, further endeared him to fans.

=== Brees Dream Foundation ===
In 2003, Brees and his wife, Brittany, founded the Brees Dream Foundation to support cancer patients and research in memory of Brittany's aunt who died of cancer. Since Brees' move to New Orleans, the foundation has expanded to provide assistance for Hurricane Katrina rebuilding projects. The foundation continues to fund and support various programs in San Diego, California, where Brees usually spends his offseasons, and West Lafayette, Indiana, where the couple's alma mater, Purdue, is located and where Brees returns to visit yearly.

Brees and his foundation have been heavily involved in Hurricane Katrina recovery. Drew and Brittany's Brees Dream Foundation announced a partnership in 2007 with international children's charity Operation Kids, to rebuild and restore and recreate academic and athletic facilities, parks, and playgrounds, after-school programs, mentoring programs for the intellectually disabled, neighborhood revitalization projects and child care facilities in New Orleans. Brees also sponsors the Rebuilding Through Brotherhood program to invite fellow Sigma Chi members to the New Orleans community to build homes with the Habitat for Humanity.

In July 2020, Brees and his wife, Brittany, partnered with Ochsner Health System and donated $5 million through the Brees Dream Foundation to help build numerous healthcare centers throughout Louisiana.

To date, the Brees Dream Foundation has donated over $35 million to charitable causes worldwide.

The Foundation was part of a joint initiative with BuildStrong and the Home Builders Institute to create the BuildStrong Academy. The academy offers students an opportunity to enhance their skills in the construction industry.

=== Other activities ===
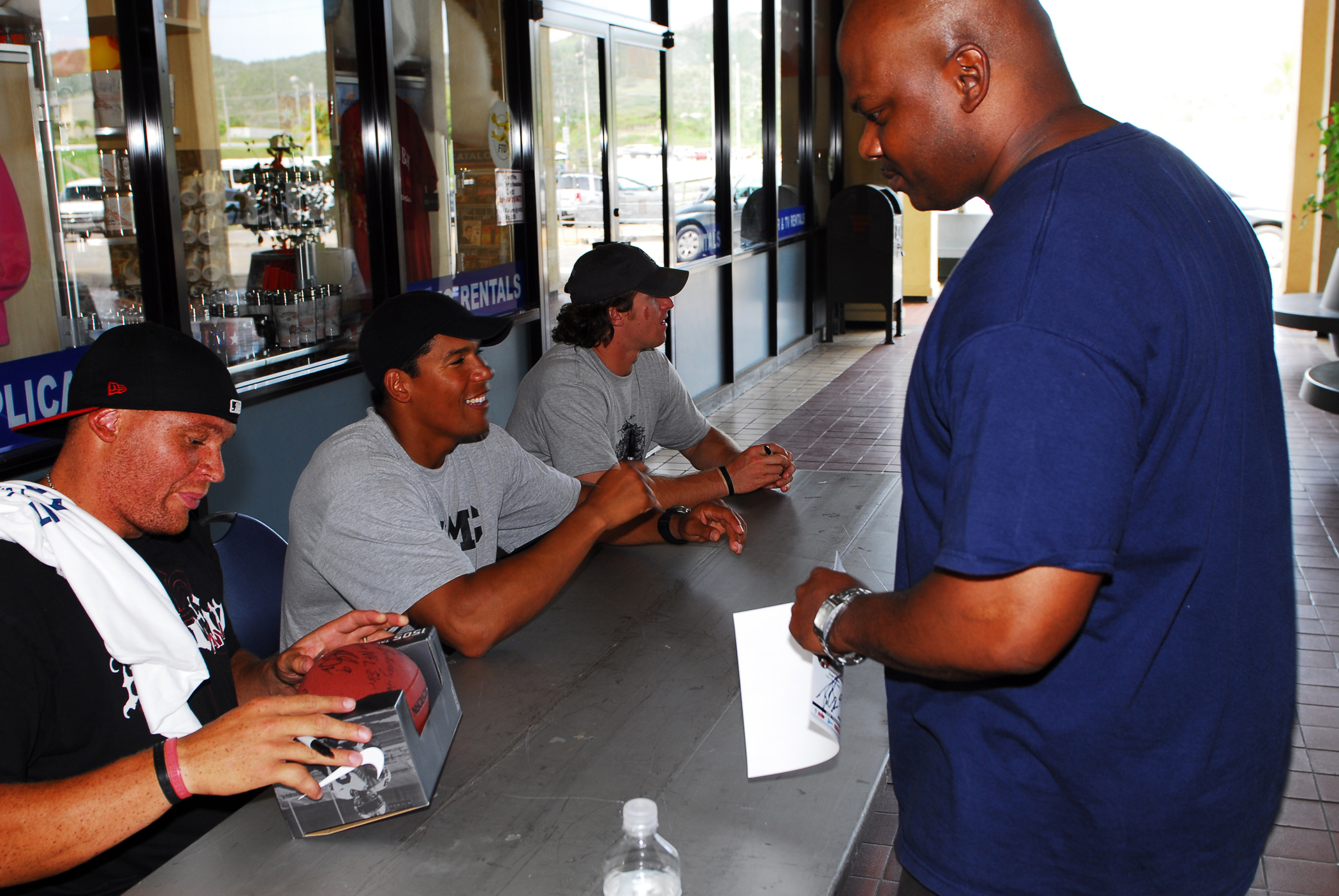
Brees signs autographs at Guantanamo Bay Naval Base on June 29, 2009, along with fellow NFL players Billy Miller and Donnie Edwards.

Brees has been on multiple USO tours throughout his career. In late June 2009, he visited the Guantanamo Bay detention camp. Following his return, Brees was quoted as stating that Guantanamo captives were being treated ten times better than convicts in U.S. prisons.

In February 2008, Brees signed a promotional deal with Chili's Grill & Bar to promote the chain's new line of hamburgers. The promotion helped raise money for charity. In June 2008, Brees participated in the Pro Sports Team Challenge, a competition for professional athletes to help raise money for charities. The charity Brees played for was Operation Kids.

On February 18, 2007, Brees was honored by the Krewe of Bacchus, a New Orleans Mardi Gras parade organization, as the 2007 Grand Marshal of the Bacchus parade. Brees presided as Bacchus XLII for the 2010 parade on February 14, 2010, one week after the Super Bowl during Mardi Gras season.

In June 2010, President Obama appointed Brees to be co-chair of the newly renamed President's Council on Sports, Fitness, and Nutrition, along with former Olympic gymnast Dominique Dawes.

In October 2010, Brees appeared in an It Gets Better video, in which he gave an anti-bullying message in the wake of a series of suicides committed by gay teenagers.

In April 2018, Brees filed a lawsuit against a San Diego jeweler. The lawsuit claims Brees and his wife paid $15 million for investment-grade diamonds that an independent appraiser valued at only $6 million. On June 21, 2019, Brees was awarded $6 million in the lawsuit.

In March 2019, Brees partnered with Brandon Landry, co-founder of Walk-On's, launching a new restaurant.

== See also ==
- List of NCAA major college football yearly total offense leaders
- List of gridiron football quarterbacks passing statistics
- List of most consecutive games with touchdown passes in the National Football League
- List of most consecutive starts by a National Football League quarterback
- List of National Football League career passer rating leaders
- List of National Football League career passing completions leaders
- List of National Football League career passing touchdowns leaders
- List of National Football League career passing yards leaders
- List of National Football League career quarterback wins leaders
- List of National Football League quarterback playoff records
- List of NFL quarterbacks who have passed for 500 or more yards in a game
- List of NFL quarterbacks who have posted a perfect passer rating
- List of NFL quarterbacks with 5,000 passing yards in a season
