= 2009 All-America college football team =

Official list of the best college football players of 2009

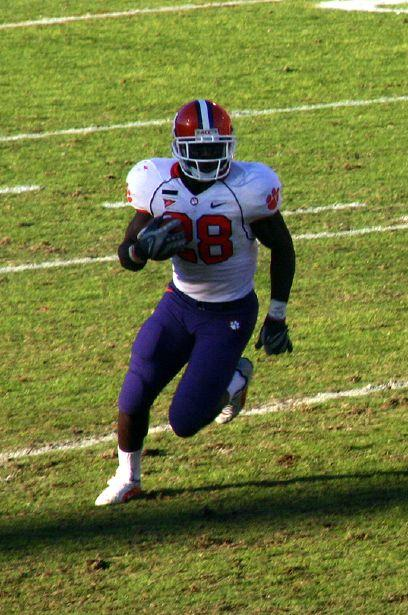
C. J. Spiller was unanimous selection at kick returner.

An All-American team is an honorary sports team for a specific season composed of the best amateur players at each position—who in turn are given the honorific "All-America" and typically referred to as "All-American athletes", or simply "All-Americans". Although the honorees generally do not compete together as a unit, the term is used in American team sports to refer to players who are selected by members of the national media.

The All-America college football team is an honor given annually to the best American college football players at their respective positions. The original All-America team was the 1889 All-America college football team selected by Caspar Whitney. In 1950, the National Collegiate Athletic Bureau, which is the National Collegiate Athletic Association's (NCAA) service bureau, compiled the first list of All-Americans including first-team selections on teams created for a national audience that received national circulation with the intent of recognizing selections made from viewpoints that were nationwide. Since 1952, College Sports Information Directors of America (CoSIDA) has bestowed Academic All-American recognition on male and female athletes in Divisions I, II, and III of the NCAA as well as National Association of Intercollegiate Athletics athletes, covering all NCAA championship sports.

The 2009 All-America college football team is composed of the following All-America teams: Associated Press (AP), Football Writers Association of America (FWAA), American Football Coaches Association (AFCA), Walter Camp Football Foundation (WCFF), The Sporting News (TSN), Sports Illustrated (SI), Pro Football Weekly (PFW), ESPN, CBS Sports (CBS), College Football News (CFN), Rivals.com, and Scout.com.

Currently, NCAA compiles consensus all-America teams in the sports of Division I-FBS football and Division I men's basketball using a point system computed from All-America teams named by coaches associations or media sources. The system consists of three points for first team, two points for second team and one point for third team. Honorable mention and fourth team or lower recognitions are not accorded any points. Football consensus teams are compiled by position and the player accumulating the most points at each position is recognized as a consensus first-team all-American. Currently, the NCAA recognizes All-Americans selected by the AP, AFCA, FWAA, TSN, and the WCFF to determine consensus All-Americans.

== Statistics ==
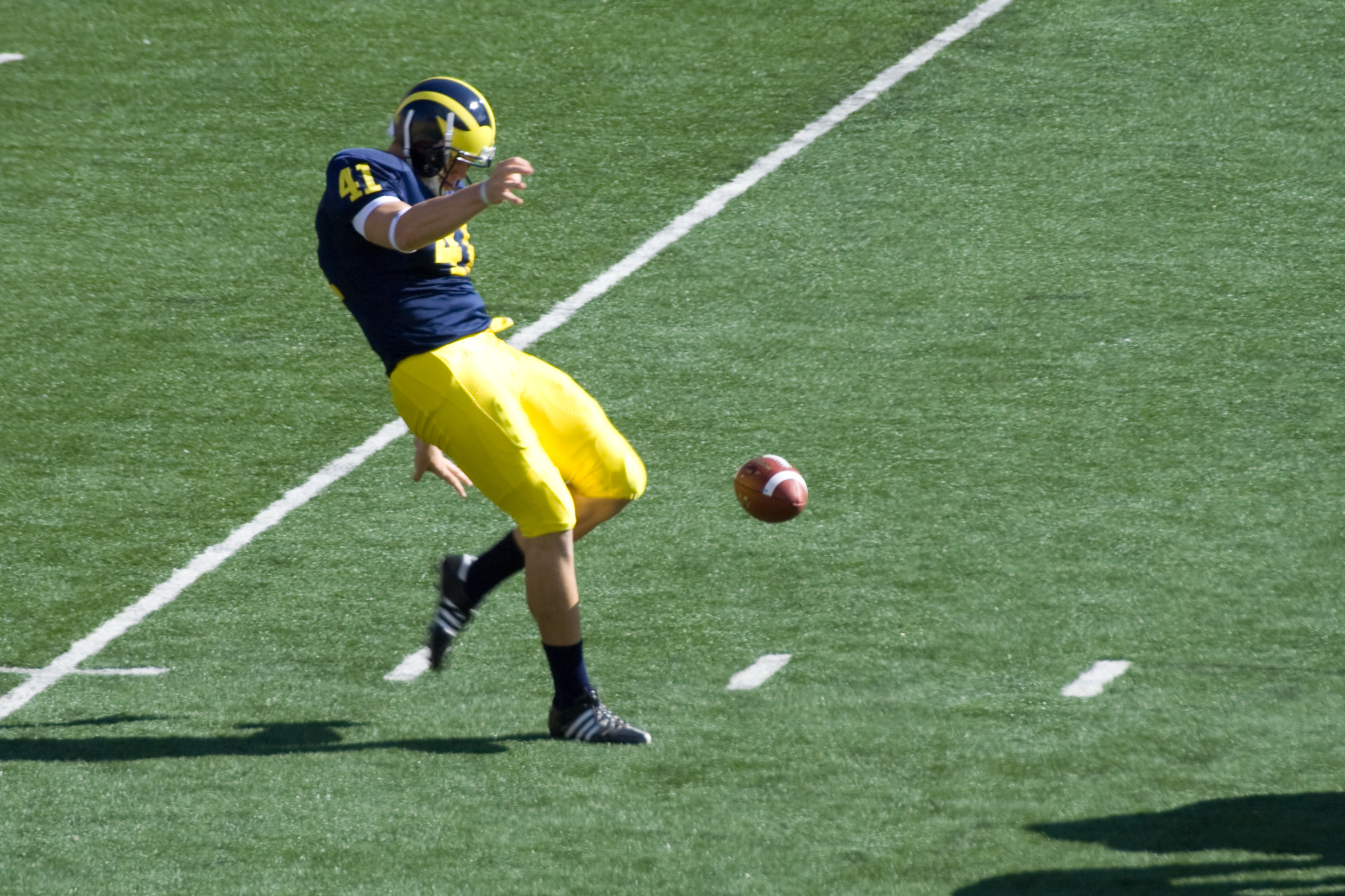
Academic All-American Zoltan Mesko was the first kicking specialist chosen in the 2010 NFL draft.

For the 2009 NCAA Division I FBS football season, the following players were unanimous first-team selections on the twelve nation-wide lists exhibited below: safety Eric Berry, punter Drew Butler, cornerback Joe Haden, offensive tackle Russell Okung, kickoff returner C. J. Spiller, defensive tackle Ndamukong Suh and wide receiver Golden Tate. Of the unanimous selections, Spiller was the only player selected at multiple positions: running back by Pro Football Weekly and kickoff returner by all other selection committees. Additionally, running back Toby Gerhart, defensive end Jerry Hughes, running back Mark Ingram II, linebacker Rolando McClain and quarterback Colt McCoy were unanimous first-team selections by the five NCAA-sanctioned selectors.

Mike Johnson, Mike Iupati and Earl Thomas were selected to the most (10 each) first team lists without being unanimously selected by all five of the NCAA-sanctioned first team lists. Danario Alexander was selected to the four lists without being chosen to any of the NCAA-sanctioned first team lists, while Kellen Moore and Brandon Graham were each selected to three unsanctioned first team lists. Colt McCoy has the distinction of being selected to the fewest lists (8) while being selected to all five sanctioned first teams.

Zane Beadles, who was a 2009 second team Academic All-America selection, is the only player to make one of the 2009 All-America teams and the 2009 Academic All-America team. Tim Tebow, who was a 2007 and 2008 All-America college football team selection, was a first team 2009 Academic All-America team selection.

== Offense ==
=== Quarterback ===
- Colt McCoy*, Texas (AP-1, AFCA, FWAA, TSN, WCFF, PFW, Rivals, Scout)
- Kellen Moore, Boise State (SI, ESPN, CBS, AP-3)
- Case Keenum, Houston (CFN)
- Tim Tebow, Florida (AP-2, TSN-2, WCFF-2)
- Jimmy Clausen, Notre Dame (TSN-3)

=== Running back ===
- Toby Gerhart*, Stanford (AP-1, AFCA, FWAA, TSN, WCFF, SI, ESPN, CBS, CFN, Rivals, Scout)
- Mark Ingram II*, Alabama (AP-1, AFCA, FWAA, TSN, WCFF, SI, ESPN, CBS, CFN, Rivals, Scout)
- C. J. Spiller, Clemson (PFW, WCFF-2)
- Dion Lewis, Pittsburgh (AP-2, TSN-2)
- Ryan Mathews, Fresno State (AP-2)
- Jacquizz Rodgers, Oregon State (TSN-2, WCFF-2, AP-3)
- LaMichael James, Oregon (AP-3, TSN-3)
- Ryan Williams, Virginia Tech (TSN-3)

=== Fullback ===
- John Conner, Kentucky (PFW)

=== Wide receiver ===
- Golden Tate*, Notre Dame (AP-1, AFCA, FWAA, TSN, WCFF, SI, PFW, ESPN, CBS, CFN, Rivals, Scout)
- Jordan Shipley, Texas (AP-1, TSN, WCFF, Rivals, Scout)
- Mardy Gilyard, Cincinnati (AFCA, AP-2, TSN-2)
- Freddie Barnes, Bowling Green (FWAA, WCFF-2, AP-3, TSN-3)
- Danario Alexander, Missouri (SI, ESPN, CBS, CFN, AP-2, TSN-2, WCFF-2)
- A. J. Green, Georgia (PFW)
- Dezmon Briscoe, Kansas (TSN-3)
- Demaryius Thomas, Georgia Tech (AP-3)

=== Tight end ===
- Dennis Pitta, BYU (AFCA, WCFF, SI, PFW, AP-2, TSN-3)
- Aaron Hernandez, Florida (AP-1, TSN, ESPN, CFN, Rivals, Scout)
- Dorin Dickerson, Pittsburgh (FWAA, CBS, TSN-2, WCFF-2, AP-3)

=== Offensive tackle ===
- Russell Okung*, Oklahoma State (AP-1, AFCA, FWAA, TSN, WCFF, SI, PFW, ESPN, CBS, CFN, Rivals, Scout)
- Trent Williams, Oklahoma (AP-1, AFCA, WCFF, PFW, CBS, CFN, Scout, TSN-2)
- Zane Beadles, Utah (FWAA, CFN, WCFF-2, TSN-3)
- Charles Brown, USC (TSN, ESPN)
- Bryan Bulaga, Iowa (TSN, AP-2, WCFF-2)
- Chris Marinelli, Stanford (Rivals, AP-2, TSN-2)
- Adam Ulatoski, Texas (TSN-2)
- Ciron Black, LSU (WCFF-2, AP-3)
- Anthony Davis, Rutgers (WCFF-2, TSN-3)
- Dennis Landolt, Penn State (AP-3)

=== Guard ===
- Mike Johnson, Alabama (AP-1, AFCA, TSN, WCFF, SI, ESPN, CBS, CFN, Rivals, Scout)
- Mike Iupati, Idaho (AP-1, AFCA, FWAA, WCFF, SI, PFW, ESPN, CBS, Rivals, Scout, TSN-2)
- Jon Asamoah, Illinois (TSN-2)
- Rodney Hudson, Florida State (FWAA, SI, AP-2)
- Mike Pouncey, Florida (PFW, AP-2)
- Jeff Byers, USC (AP-3)
- Brandon Carter, Texas Tech (AP-3)
- John Jerry, Ole Miss (TSN-3)
- Eric Olsen, Notre Dame (TSN-3)

=== Center ===
- Maurkice Pouncey, Florida (FWAA, TSN, WCFF, PFW, ESPN, CBS, CFN, Rivals, Scout)
- J. D. Walton, Baylor (AP-1)
- Chris Hall, Texas (AFCA, AP-3)
- Jake Kirkpatrick, TCU (SI)
- Matt Tennant, Boston College (WCFF-2)
- Thomas Austin, Clemson (TSN-3)

== Defense ==
=== Defensive end ===
- Jerry Hughes*, TCU (AP-1, AFCA, FWAA, TSN, WCFF, SI, ESPN, CBS, CFN, Rivals)
- Derrick Morgan, Georgia Tech (AP-1, AFCA, PFW, Scout, TSN-2, WCFF-2)
- Brandon Graham, Michigan (ESPN, Rivals, Scout, AP-2, TSN-2, WCFF-2)
- Von Miller, Texas A&M (TSN, SI, AP-2, WCFF-2)
- Jason Pierre-Paul, South Florida (PFW)
- Jeremy Beal, Oklahoma (AP-3)
- Greg Romeus, Pittsburgh (TSN-3)
- Brandon Sharpe, Texas Tech (AP-3, TSN-3)

=== Defensive tackle ===
- Ndamukong Suh*, Nebraska (AP-1, AFCA, FWAA, TSN, WCFF, SI, PFW, ESPN, CBS, CFN, Rivals, Scout)
- Terrence Cody, Alabama (AP-1, FWAA, WCFF, CBS, CFN, Scout, TSN-2)
- Gerald McCoy, Oklahoma (FWAA, TSN, WCFF, SI, CFN, Rivals, AP-2)
- Brian Price, UCLA (AFCA, SI, ESPN, TSN-2, WCFF-2, AP-3)
- Jared Odrick, Penn State (AFCA, CBS, AP-2, TSN-3)
- Vince Oghobaase, Duke (TSN-3)
- Dan Williams, Tennessee (AP-3)

=== Linebacker ===
- Rolando McClain*, Alabama (AP-1, AFCA, FWAA, TSN, WCFF, SI, PFW, ESPN, CBS, Rivals, Scout)
- Greg Jones, Michigan State (AP-1, AFCA, FWAA, SI, ESPN, CBS, CFN, Rivals, Scout, WCFF-2, TSN-3)
- Brandon Spikes, Florida (TSN, WCFF, Scout, AP-2)
- Eric Norwood, South Carolina (AP-1, WCFF, TSN-3)
- Pat Angerer, Iowa (FWAA, SI, CFN, Rivals, AP-2, WCFF-2)
- Sergio Kindle, Texas (TSN, PFW, AP-3)
- Rennie Curran, Georgia (CBS)
- Luke Kuechly, Boston College (CFN)
- Daryl Washington, TCU (ESPN, TSN-2)
- Sean Weatherspoon, Missouri (PFW, AP-2, TSN-2, WCFF-2)
- NaVorro Bowman, Penn State (TSN-2, AP-3)
- Cody Grimm, Virginia Tech (AP-3)
- Andre Revels, Cincinnati (TSN-3)

=== Cornerback ===
- Joe Haden*, Florida (AP-1, AFCA, FWAA, TSN, WCFF, SI, PFW, ESPN, CBS, CFN, Rivals, Scout)
- Javier Arenas, Alabama (AP-1, AFCA, SI, TSN-2, WCFF-2)
- Perrish Cox, Oklahoma State (TSN, CFN, AP-2)
- Patrick Peterson, LSU (PFW, ESPN, TSN-2)
- Alterraun Verner, UCLA (Rivals, AP-3)
- Kyle Wilson, Boise State (AP-2, WCFF-2)
- Brandon Harris, Miami (AP-3)
- Rafael Priest, TCU (TSN-3)
- Syd'Quan Thompson, California (TSN-3)

=== Safety ===
- Eric Berry*, Tennessee (AP-1, AFCA, FWAA, TSN, WCFF, SI, PFW, ESPN, CBS, CFN, Rivals, Scout)
- Earl Thomas, Texas (AP-1, AFCA, FWAA, WCFF, SI, PFW, ESPN, CBS, Rivals, Scout, TSN-2)
- Taylor Mays, USC (WCFF, CFN, AP-2, TSN-2)
- Kurt Coleman, Ohio State (TSN)
- DeAndre McDaniel, Clemson (FWAA, WCFF-2, TSN-3)
- Tyler Sash, Iowa (CBS, AP-3)
- Rahim Moore, UCLA (Scout, AP-2, WCFF-2, TSN-3)
- Mark Barron, Alabama (AP-3)

== Special teams ==
=== Kicker ===
- Kai Forbath, UCLA (AFCA, FWAA, TSN, WCFF, PFW, ESPN, CFN, Rivals, AP-2)
- Leigh Tiffin, Alabama (AP-1, CBS, Scout, WCFF-2, TSN-3)
- Grant Ressel, Missouri (SI, TSN-2)
- Hunter Lawrence, Texas (AP-3)

=== Punter ===
- Drew Butler*, Georgia (AP-1, AFCA, FWAA, TSN, WCFF, SI, PFW, ESPN, CBS, CFN, Rivals, Scout)
- Matt Dodge, East Carolina (TSN-2)
- Zoltán Meskó, Michigan (AP-2, WCFF-2)
- Matt Reagan, Memphis (AP-3)
- Tress Way, Oklahoma (TSN-3)

=== All-purpose / Kick returner ===
- C. J. Spiller*, Clemson (AP-1, AFCA, FWAA, TSN, WCFF, SI, ESPN, CBS, CFN, Rivals, Scout)
- Brandon Banks, Kansas State (PFW, TSN-3)
- Mardy Gilyard, Cincinnati (SI)
- Greg Reid, Florida State (CFN, TSN-3)
- Chris Owusu, Stanford (TSN-2, WCFF-2)
- James Rodgers, Oregon State (AP-2)
- Dexter McCluster, Georgia Tech (AP-3)

=== Punt returner ===
- Antonio Brown, Central Michigan (TSN)
- Javier Arenas, Alabama (CBS, Rivals)
- LaVon Brazill, Ohio (TSN-2)

== Key ==
- **Player name in bold** — consensus All-American
- * — unanimous All-American
- **Selector name in bold** — official selector

Official selectors:

- Associated Press (AP)
- American Football Coaches Association (AFCA)
- Football Writers Association of America (FWAA)
- The Sporting News (TSN)
- Walter Camp Football Foundation (WCFF)

Other selectors:

- Sports Illustrated (SI)
- Pro Football Weekly (PFW)
- ESPN
- CBS Sports (CBS)
- College Football News (CFN)
- Rivals.com
- Scout.com

Sources of the teams:

== Academic All-America ==
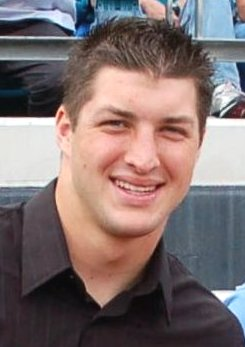
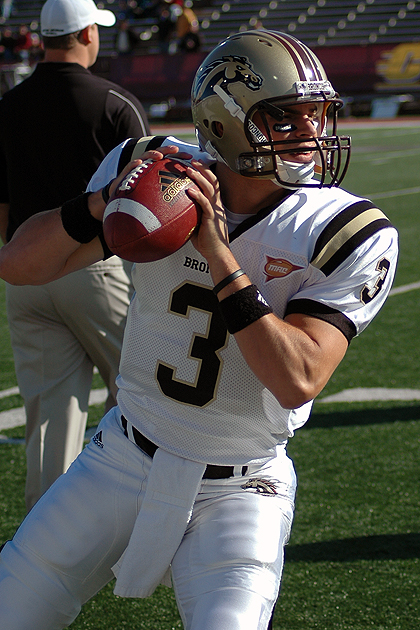
Tim Tebow and Tim Hiller were the first and second team Academic All-American quarterbacks

The following players were selected to the University Division Academic All-America first and second teams.

=== First-team ===
| Position | Player | Team |
|---|---|---|
| QB | Tim Tebow | Florida |
| RB | Andre Anderson | Tulane |
| RB | Kyle Minett | South Dakota State |
| WR | Zeke Markshausen | Northwestern |
| WR | Blair White | Michigan State |
| TE | Colin Peek | Alabama |
| OL | Andrew Jackson | Fresno State |
| OL | Jim McKenzie | Syracuse |
| OL | Andrew Pitz | Penn State |
| OL | Adam Ulatoski | Texas |
| OL | Stefen Wisniewski | Penn State |
| DL | Sam Acho | Texas |
| DL | Jacob Kragt | Eastern Washington |
| DL | Adam Rundh | Valparaiso |
| DL | Brandon Wingeier | Dayton |
| LB | Josh Hull | Penn State |
| LB | Josh Mahoney | Northern Iowa |
| LB | Mike Nixon | Arizona State |
| DB | Josh Cain | Jacksonville State |
| DB | Beau Hadley | Weber State |
| DB | Scott Johnson | BYU |
| DB | Chris Rocco | Liberty |
| K | Brandon Hellevang | North Dakota |
| P | Zoltán Meskó | Michigan |

=== Second-team ===
| Position | Player | Team |
|---|---|---|
| QB | Tim Hiller | Western Michigan |
| RB | Chris Ganious | South Dakota |
| RB | Jacquise Terry | Kent State |
| WR | Rocky Ross | UCF |
| WR | Ryan Whalen | Stanford |
| TE | Jeron Mastrud | Kansas State |
| OL | Taylor Askew | Tennessee Tech |
| OL | Zane Beadles | Utah |
| OL | John Dowd | Navy |
| OL | Mitch Enright | SMU |
| OL | Paul Jasinowski | Brown |
| OL | Barrett Jones | Alabama |
| DL | Grant Hunter | Butler |
| DL | Ryan Kerrigan | Purdue |
| DL | Dan Millington | Indiana State |
| DL | Nick Nolte | North Dakota |
| LB | Matthew Bauman | BYU |
| LB | Joe Pawelek | Baylor |
| LB | Reed Williams | West Virginia |
| DB | Mike Anello | Notre Dame |
| DB | Conrad Kjerstad | South Dakota State |
| DB | Mike McElroy | Southern Illinois |
| DB | Chima Nwachukwu | Washington State |
| K | Stefan Demos | Northwestern |
| P | Robert Malone | Fresno State |

== See also ==
- 2009 All-ACC football team
- 2009 All-Big 12 Conference football team
- 2009 All-Big Ten Conference football team
- 2009 All-Pacific-10 Conference football team
- 2009 All-SEC football team
