= 2009 All-Big 12 Conference football team =

The 2009 All-Big 12 Conference football team consists of American football players chosen as All-Big 12 Conference players for the 2009 Big 12 Conference football season. The conference recognizes two official All-Big 12 selectors: (1) the Big 12 conference coaches selected separate offensive and defensive units and named first- and second-team players (the "Coaches" team); and (2) a panel of sports writers and broadcasters covering the Big 12 also selected offensive and defensive units and named first- and second-team players (the "Media" team).

== Offensive selections ==
=== Quarterbacks ===
- Colt McCoy, Texas (Coaches-1; Media-1)
- Jerrod Johnson, Texas A&M (Coaches-2; Media-2)

=== Running backs ===
- Daniel Thomas, Kansas State (Coaches-1; Media-1)
- Keith Toston, Oklahoma State (Coaches-1; Media-2)
- Bryant Ward, Oklahoma State (Coaches-1)
- Roy Helu Jr., Nebraska (Coaches-2)
- DeMarco Murray, Oklahoma (Coaches-2)

=== Centers ===
- Reggie Stephens, Iowa State (Media-1)
- Jacob Hickman, Nebraska (Media-2)

=== Offensive Line ===
- Brandon Carter, Texas Tech (Coaches-1; Media-1)
- Russell Okung, Oklahoma State (Coaches-1; Media-1)
- Trent Williams, Oklahoma (Coaches-1; Media-1)
- Nick Stringer, Kansas State (Coaches-1; Media-2)
- Adam Ulatoski, Texas (Coaches-2; Media-1)
- Nate Solder, Colorado (Coaches-1)
- Kurtis Gregory, Missouri (Coaches-2; Media-2)
- J. D. Walton, Baylor (Coaches-2)
- Chris Hall, Texas (Coaches-2)
- Brody Eldridge, Oklahoma (Coaches-2)
- Lee Grimes, Texas A&M (Coaches-2)
- Kelechi Osemele, Iowa State (Media-2)
- Charlie Tanner, Texas (Media-2)

=== Tight ends ===
- Jeron Mastrud, Kansas State (Coaches-1)
- Riar Geer, Colorado (Coaches-2; Media-1)
- Mike McNeill, Nebraska (Media-2)

=== Receivers ===
- Jordan Shipley, Texas (Coaches-1; Media-1)
- Danario Alexander, Missouri (Coaches-1; Media-1)
- Dezmon Briscoe, Kansas (Coaches-1; Media-1)
- Ryan Broyles, Oklahoma (Coaches-2; Media-2)
- Kerry Meier, Kansas (Coaches-2; Media-2)
- Brandon Banks, Kansas State (Coaches-2)
- Scotty McKnight, Colorado (Media-2)

== Defensive selections ==
=== Defensive linemen ===
- Gerald McCoy, Oklahoma (Coaches-1; Media-1)
- Von Miller, Texas A&M (Coaches-1; Media-1)
- Ndamukong Suh, Nebraska (Coaches-1; Media-1)
- Brandon Sharpe, Texas Tech (Coaches-1; Media-1)
- Jared Crick, Nebraska (Coaches-1; Media-2)
- Sergio Kindle, Texas (Coaches-2; Media-2)
- Lamarr Houston, Texas (Coaches-2; Media-2)
- Jeremy Beal, Oklahoma (Coaches-2; Media-1)
- Jaron Baston, Missouri (Coaches-2)
- Daniel Howard, Texas Tech (Coaches-2)
- Aldon Smith, Missouri (Media-2)

=== Linebackers ===
- Sean Weatherspoon, Missouri (Coaches-1; Media-1)
- Jesse Smith, Iowa State (Coaches-1; Media-1)
- Travis Lewis, Oklahoma (Coaches-1; Media-2)
- Joe Pawelek, Baylor (Coaches-2; Media-1)
- Roddrick Muckelroy, Texas (Coaches-2; Media-2)
- Phillip Dillard, Nebraska (Coaches-2; Media-2)
- Donald Booker, Oklahoma State (Media-2)

=== Defensive backs ===
- Perrish Cox, Oklahoma State (Coaches-1; Media-1)
- Earl Thomas, Texas (Coaches-1; Media-1)
- Prince Amukamara, Nebraska (Coaches-1; Media-2)
- Larry Asante, Nebraska (Coaches-1)
- Darrell Stuckey, Kansas (Media-1)
- Jamar Wall, Texas Tech (Coaches-2)
- Quinton Carter, Oklahoma (Coaches-2)
- Brian Jackson, Oklahoma (Coaches-2; Media-2)
- Jordan Lake, Baylor (Coaches-2; Media-1)
- Cha'pelle Brown, Colorado (Coaches-2)
- Trent Hunter, Texas A&M (Coaches-2)
- Dominique Franks, Oklahoma (Media-2)
- Jimmy Smith, Colorado (Media-2)

== Special teams ==
=== Kickers ===
- Grant Ressel, Missouri (Coaches-1; Media-1)
- Alex Henery, Nebraska (Coaches-2; Media-2)

=== Punters ===
- Derek Epperson, Baylor (Coaches-1; Media-1)
- Tress Way, Oklahoma (Coaches-2; Media-2)

=== All-purpose / Return specialists ===
- Brandon Banks, Kansas State (Coaches-1; Media-1)
- Perrish Cox, Oklahoma State (Coaches-2)
- Cyrus Gray, Texas A&M (Media-2)

== Key ==
Bold = selected as a first-team player by both the coaches and media panel

Coaches = selected by Big 12 Conference coaches

Media = selected by a media panel

== See also ==
- 2009 College Football All-America Team
