= 2008 All-Big 12 Conference football team =

The 2008 All-Big 12 Conference football team consists of American football players chosen as All-Big 12 Conference players for the 2008 NCAA Division I FBS football season. The conference recognizes two official All-Big 12 selectors: (1) the Big 12 conference coaches selected separate offensive and defensive units and named first- and second-team players (the "Coaches" team); and (2) a panel of sports writers and broadcasters covering the Big 12 also selected offensive and defensive units and named first- and second-team players (the "Media" team).

== Offensive selections ==
=== Quarterbacks ===
- Sam Bradford, Oklahoma (Coaches-1; Media-1)
- Colt McCoy, Texas (Coaches-2; Media-2)

=== Running backs ===
- Kendall Hunter, Oklahoma State (Coaches-1; Media-1)
- DeMarco Murray, Oklahoma (Coaches-1; Media-2)
- Derrick Washington, Missouri (Coaches-2)
- Shannon Woods, Texas Tech (Coaches-2)

=== Offensive Line ===
- Jason Smith, Baylor (Coaches-1; Media-1)
- Phil Loadholt, Oklahoma (Coaches-1; Media-1)
- Duke Robinson, Oklahoma (Coaches-1; Media-1)
- Russell Okung, Oklahoma State (Coaches-1; Media-1)
- Jon Cooper, Oklahoma (Coaches-2; Media-1)
- Adam Ulatoski, Texas (Coaches-1; Media-2)
- Rylan Reed, Texas Tech (Coaches-2; Media-1)
- Trent Williams, Oklahoma (Coaches-1)
- Matt Slauson, Nebraska (Coaches-2; Media-2)
- Louis Vasquez, Texas Tech (Coaches-2; Media-2)
- Kurtis Gregory, Missouri (Coaches-2)
- Chris Hall, Texas (Coaches-2)

=== Tight ends ===
- Chase Coffman, Missouri (Coaches-2; Media-1)
- Jermaine Gresham, Oklahoma (Coaches-1; Media-2)

=== Receivers ===
- Michael Crabtree, Texas Tech (Coaches-1; Media-1)
- Dez Bryant, Oklahoma State (Coaches-1; Media-1)
- Jeremy Maclin, Missouri (Coaches-1; Media-1)
- Dezmon Briscoe, Kansas (Coaches-2; Media-2)
- Jordan Shipley, Texas (Coaches-2; Media-2)
- Quan Cosby, Texas (Media-2)
- Juaquin Iglesias, Oklahoma (Coaches-2)

== Defensive selections ==
=== Defensive linemen ===
- Brian Orakpo, Texas (Coaches-1; Media-1)
- Brandon Williams, Texas Tech (Coaches-1; Media-1)
- Jeremy Beal, Oklahoma (Coaches-2; Media-1)
- Gerald McCoy, Oklahoma (Coaches-1; Media-2)
- Roy Miller, Texas (Coaches-1; Media-2)
- Ndamukong Suh, Nebraska (Coaches-2; Media-1)
- Ziggy Hood, Missouri (Coaches-1)
- George Hypolite, Colorado (Coaches-2; Media-2)
- Stryker Sulak, Missouri (Coaches-2; Media-2)
- Ian Campbell, Kansas State (Coaches-2)

=== Linebackers ===
- Joe Pawelek, Baylor (Coaches-1; Media-1)
- Sean Weatherspoon, Missouri (Coaches-1; Media-1)
- Sergio Kindle, Texas (Coaches-1; Media-2)
- James Holt, Kansas (Coaches-2; Media-1)
- Travis Lewis, Oklahoma (Coaches-2; Media-1)
- Andre Sexton, Oklahoma State (Coaches-2; Media-2)
- Roddrick Muckelroy, Texas (Media-2)
- Jeff Smart, Colorado (Media-2)

=== Defensive backs ===
- Jordan Lake, Baylor (Coaches-1; Media-1)
- Darcel McBath, Texas Tech (Coaches-1; Media-1)
- Darrell Stuckey, Kansas (Coaches-1; Media-1)
- Daniel Charbonnet, Texas Tech (Coaches-2; Media-1)
- Nic Harris, Oklahoma (Coaches-1; Media-2)
- William Moore, Missouri (Coaches-1; Media-2)
- Dominique Franks, Oklahoma (Coaches-2; Media-2)
- Lendy Holmes, Oklahoma (Coaches-2; Media-2)
- Jacob Lacey, Oklahoma State (Coaches-2)
- Ryan Palmer, Texas (Coaches-2)

== Special teams ==
=== Kickers ===
- Jeff Wolfert, Missouri (Coaches-1; Media-1)

=== Punters ===
- Justin Brantly, Texas A&M (Coaches-1; Media-1)
- Matt Fodge, Oklahoma State (Coaches-2; Media-2)

=== All-purpose / Return specialists ===
- Dez Bryant, Oklahoma State (Coaches-1)
- Jeremy Maclin, Missouri (Media-1)
- DeMarco Murray, Oklahoma (Media-2)
- Jordan Shipley, Texas (Coaches-2)

== Key ==
Bold = selected as a first-team player by both the coaches and media panel

Coaches = selected by Big 12 Conference coaches

Media = selected by a media panel

== See also ==
- 2008 College Football All-America Team
