= Earl Thomas =

American football player (born 1989)

Earl Thomas III
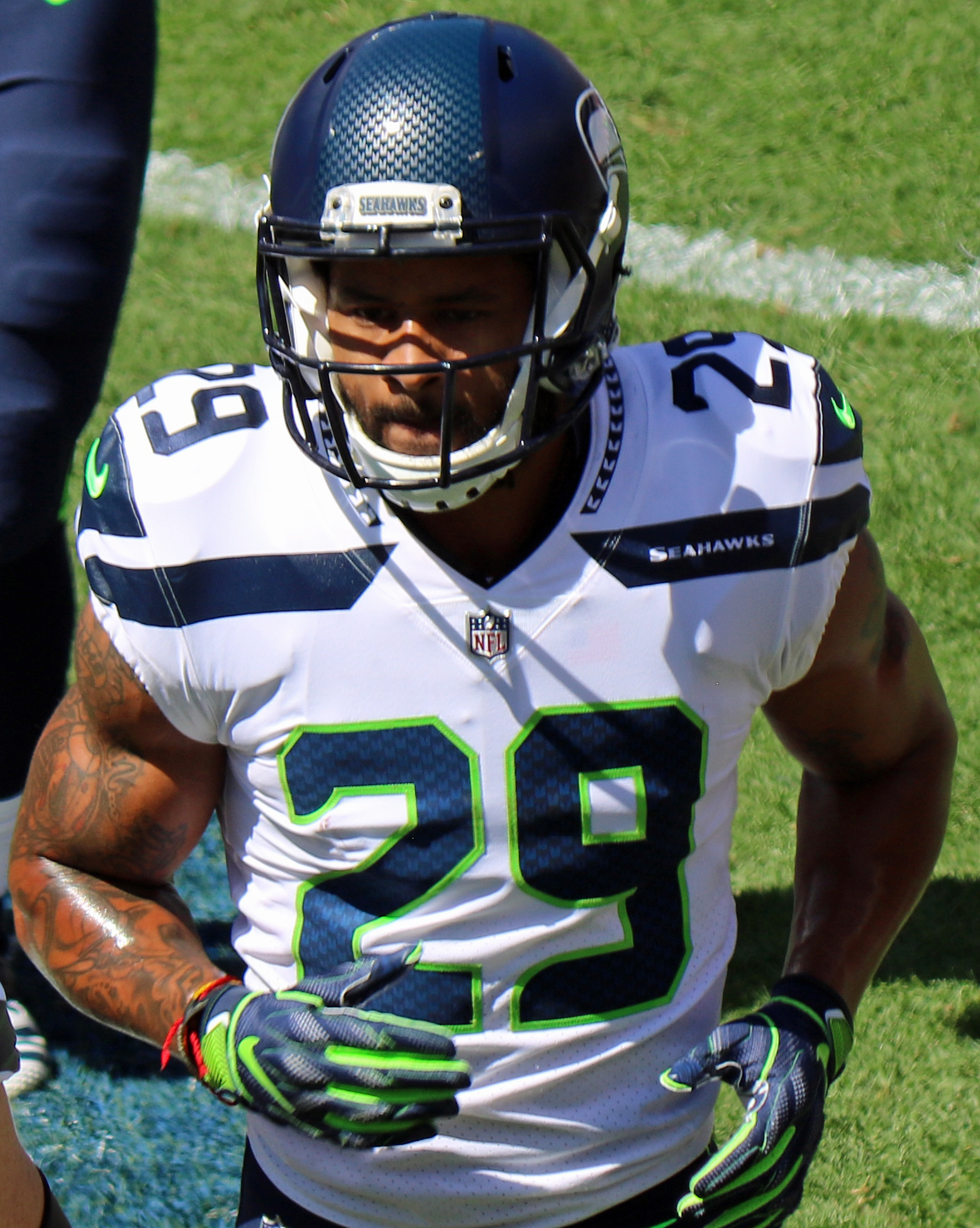
- Thomas with the Seattle Seahawks in 2018

No. 29
- Position: Safety

Personal information
- Born: May 7, 1989 (age 37); Orange, Texas, U.S.
- Listed height: 5 ft 10 in (1.78 m)
- Listed weight: 202 lb (92 kg)

Career information
- High school: West Orange-Stark (Orange)
- College: Texas (2007–2009)
- NFL draft: 2010: 1st round, 14th overall pick

Career history
- Seattle Seahawks (2010–2018); Baltimore Ravens (2019)

Awards and highlights
- Super Bowl champion (XLVIII); 3× First-team All-Pro (2012–2014); 2× Second-team All-Pro (2011, 2017); 7× Pro Bowl (2011–2015, 2017, 2019); NFL 2010s All-Decade Team; Seattle Seahawks Top 50 players; Consensus All-American (2009); First-team All-Big 12 (2009)

Career NFL statistics
- Total tackles: 713
- Sacks: 2.0
- Forced fumbles: 12
- Fumble recoveries: 6
- Interceptions: 30
- Defensive touchdowns: 4
- Stats at Pro Football Reference

Earl Winty Thomas III (born May 7, 1989) is an American former professional football player who was a safety in the National Football League (NFL). He played college football for the Texas Longhorns and received consensus All-American honors and played in the 2010 BCS National Championship Game. He left after his redshirt sophomore year and he was selected by the Seattle Seahawks in the first round of the 2010 NFL draft. During his time with the Seahawks, he made six Pro Bowls and five All-Pro teams as he was a core member of the Legion of Boom defense, winning Super Bowl XLVIII against the Denver Broncos and starting in Super Bowl XLIX. After nine seasons with Seattle, he signed with the Baltimore Ravens as a free agent and played one season while earning his seventh Pro Bowl invite.

== Early life ==
Thomas attended West Orange-Stark High School in Orange, Texas, where he played for the West Orange-Stark Mustangs high school football team, and also lettered in basketball, baseball and track and field. While there, he was an all-state selection and three-year starter at defensive back, running back and wide receiver. He recorded 112 career tackles with 11 interceptions, two kickoff return touchdowns and two punt return touchdowns, while also having 1,850 rushing yards and 2,140 receiving yards in his career.

Thomas was on the school's track & field team, where he competed as a sprinter and jumper, and was a member of the 4 × 200 meters relay team that reached the state finals, at 1:27.92. He finished second in the long jump at the 2007 Region 3-3A Meet, with a personal-best mark of 7.14 meters.

Considered a four-star recruit by Rivals.com, Thomas was ranked as the No. 12 athlete in 2007.

== College career ==
Thomas attended the University of Texas at Austin, where he played for coach Mack Brown's Texas Longhorns football team from 2007 to 2009. After redshirting his first year at Texas, Thomas started all 13 games at strong safety for the Longhorns in 2008, and ranked second on the team with 63 combined tackles and 17 pass breakups, the most ever by a Longhorn freshman. He also had two interceptions, four forced fumbles, and a blocked kick. Thomas subsequently earned multiple All-Freshman honors, as he was named to FWAA's Freshman All-America team, Sporting News′ Freshman All-American team, College Football News′ All-Freshman first-team, and Rivals.com's Freshman All-America team.

As a redshirt sophomore in 2009, Thomas intercepted eight passes, returning two of them for touchdowns. Thomas was a consensus first-team All-American, named to the first-team All-Big 12 team and was a finalist for the Jim Thorpe Award. The Longhorns were undefeated in the regular season and Thomas played in the 2010 BCS National Championship Game where they lost to Alabama. Thomas chose to forgo his final two seasons of eligibility at Texas to declare for the 2010 NFL draft where he was the third defensive back taken after Eric Berry and Joe Haden.

== Professional career ==
=== Pre-draft ===
On January 8, 2010, Thomas released a statement through the University of Texas which announced his decision to forgo his remaining eligibility and enter the 2010 NFL Draft. He attended the NFL Scouting Combine in Indianapolis and completed the majority of drills, but chose to skip the short shuttle and three-cone drill. On March 31, 2010, he participated at Texas' pro day and improved his 40-yard dash (4.37s), 20-yard dash (2.47s), and 10-yard dash (1.49s). Thomas sustained a hamstring injury during his workout and was unable to complete his entire performance.

External videos
- Earl Thomas' NFL Combine Workout

"I've probably watched 300-400 snaps apiece and in my opinion, Earl Thomas is the most instinctive free safety I've seen on tape in five or six years. He's a playmaker, he's got loose hips, and he's got the best range of any centerfielder I've seen coming out of college football in a long time."

— Mike Mayock

He attended pre-draft visits and private workouts with multiple teams, including the Pittsburgh Steelers, Cleveland Browns, and Miami Dolphins. At the conclusion of the pre-draft process, Thomas was projected to be a first round pick by NFL draft experts and scouts. He was ranked as the top safety in the draft by NFL analyst Mike Mayock, was ranked the second best safety by NFL analyst Mel Kiper Jr. and ESPN Scouts Inc., and was ranked the second best cornerback prospect by DraftScout.com.

Pre-draft measurables
| Height | Weight | Arm length | Hand span | Wingspan | 40-yard dash | 10-yard split | 20-yard split | Vertical jump | Broad jump | Bench press |
|---|---|---|---|---|---|---|---|---|---|---|
| 5 ft 10 1/4 in (1.78 m) | 208 lb (94 kg) | 31 1/4 in (0.79 m) | 9 3/8 in (0.24 m) | 6 ft 2 1/2 in (1.89 m) | 4.49 s | 1.62 s | 2.65 s | 32 in (0.81 m) | 9 ft 5 in (2.87 m) | 21 reps |
All values from NFL Combine

=== Seattle Seahawks ===
==== 2010 ====
The Seattle Seahawks selected Thomas in the first round (14th overall) of the 2010 NFL draft. Thomas was the second safety drafted in 2010, behind Eric Berry. At age 20, he was one of the youngest players eligible for the draft.

External videos
- Seahawks draft Earl Thomas 14th overall
- NFL Draft Profile: Earl Thomas

On July 31, 2010, the Seahawks signed Thomas to a five-year, $18.30 million contract that includes $11.75 million guaranteed and a signing bonus of $500,000.

Head coach Pete Carroll named Thomas the starting free safety to begin the regular season, alongside strong safety Lawyer Milloy. He made his professional regular season debut and first career start in the Seattle Seahawks' season-opener against the San Francisco 49ers and recorded seven combined tackles in their 31–6 victory. On September 26, 2010, Thomas made six combined tackles, two pass deflections, and two interceptions during a 27–20 victory against the San Diego Chargers in Week 3. Thomas made his first career interception off a pass by Chargers' quarterback Philip Rivers, that was originally intended for tight end Antonio Gates, and returned it for a 34-yard gain in the fourth quarter. On November 14, 2010, he collected a season-high eight solo tackles in the Seahawks' 36–18 victory at the Arizona Cardinals in Week 10. In Week 12, Thomas collected eight combined tackles and returned a blocked punt for the first touchdown of his career during a 42–24 loss to the Kansas City Chiefs. Thomas recovered a blocked punt that Kennard Cox blocked by Dustin Colquitt and returned it for a ten-yard touchdown in the first quarter. Thomas started all 16 games during his rookie season in 2010 and recorded 76 combined tackles (64 solo), seven pass deflections, five interceptions, and a forced fumble.

The Seattle Seahawks finished first in the NFC West with a 7–9 record and earned a playoff berth. On January 9, 2011, Thomas started in his first career playoff game and recorded eight solo tackles and a pass deflection during a 41–36 victory against the New Orleans Saints in the NFC wild-card round. The following week, he made four solo tackles as the Seahawks lost 35–24 at the Chicago Bears in the NFC divisional round.

==== 2011 ====
Thomas entered training camp slated as the starting free safety. Head coach Pete Carroll named Thomas and Kam Chancellor the starting safeties to begin the regular season.

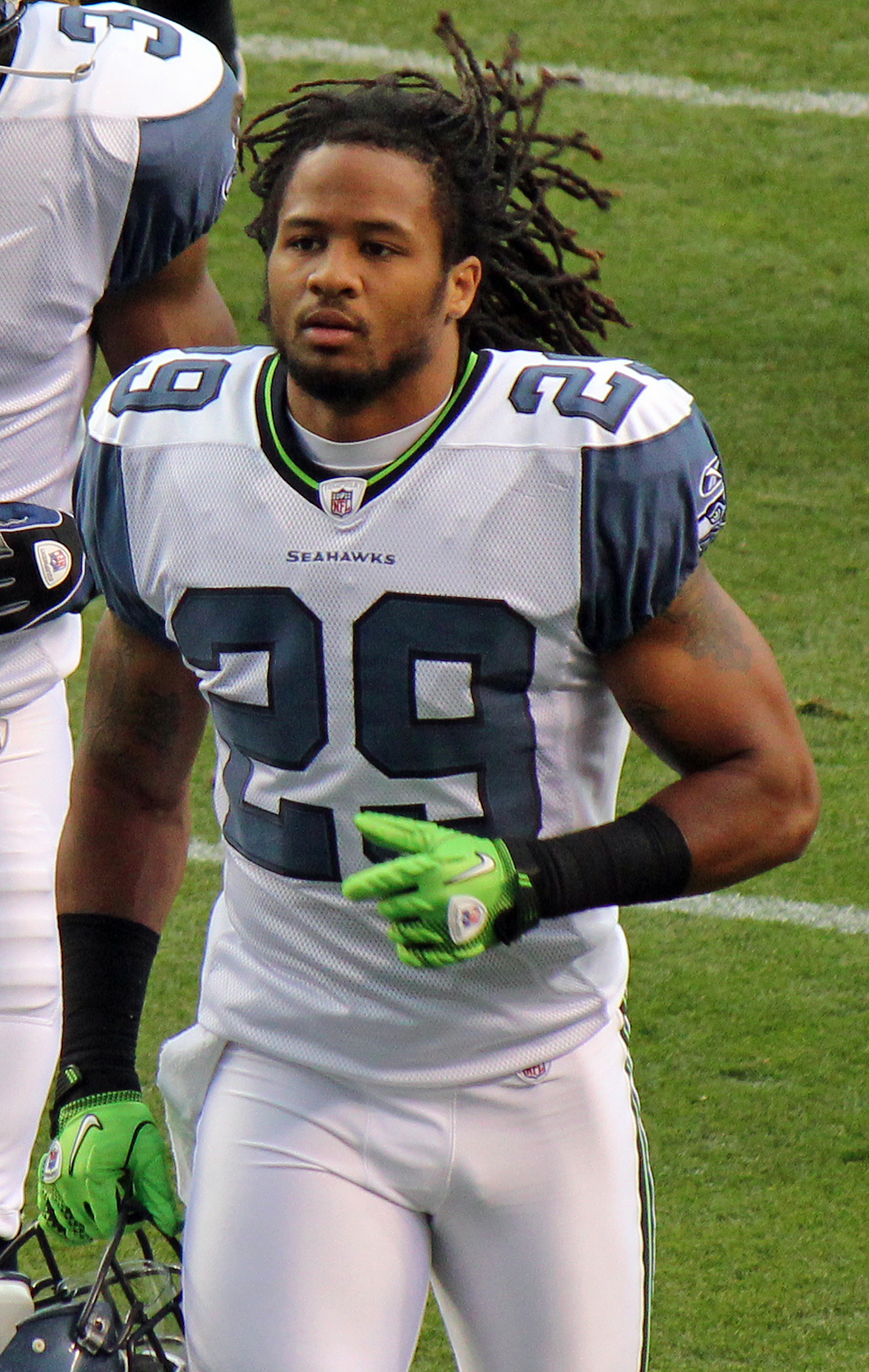
Thomas in the 2011 preseason

In Week 8, he collected a season-high ten combined tackles (four solo) during a 34–12 loss to the Cincinnati Bengals. The following week, Thomas recorded a season-high eight solo tackles in the Seahawks' 23–13 loss at the Dallas Cowboys in Week 9. On December 27, 2011, it was announced that Thomas was selected to play in the 2012 Pro Bowl, marking the first Pro Bowl selection of his career. Kam Chancellor and Brandon Browner were also selected to the 2012 Pro Bowl. He finished the season with 98 combined tackles (69 solo), seven pass deflections, two interceptions, and a forced fumble in 16 games and 16 starts. Thomas was named second-team All-Pro and was ranked 66th on the NFL Top 100 Players of 2012.

==== 2012 ====
Thomas and Kam Chancellor returned as the Seahawks' starting safety duo. On November 4, 2012, Thomas collected a season-high seven combined tackles and deflected a pass during a 30–20 victory against the Minnesota Viking in Week 9. The following week, he tied his season-high of seven combined tackles as the Seahawks defeated the New York Jets 28–7 in Week 10. On December 16, 2012, Thomas recorded five combined tackles, broke up a pass, and had the first pick six of his career during a 50–17 win at the Buffalo Bills in Week 15. Thomas intercepted a pass by quarterback Ryan Fitzpatrick, that was originally intended for tight end Scott Chandler, and returned it for a 57-yard touchdown in the third quarter. On December 26, 2012, it was announced that Thomas was selected to the 2013 Pro Bowl and was the sole member of the Seahawks' defense to be selected in 2012. Thomas started in 16 games in 2012 and recorded 66 combined tackles (42 solo), nine pass deflections, three interceptions, a forced fumble, and one touchdown. On January 2, he was selected to the 2013 All-Pro Team.

The Seattle Seahawks finished second in the NFC West with an 11–5 record and earned a Wild Card berth. On January 6, 2013, Thomas started in the NFC Wild Card Round and made four combined tackles, a pass deflection, and intercepted a pass by quarterback Robert Griffin III during the Seahawks' 24–14 victory over the Washington Redskins. The following week, he recorded four combined tackles, broke up a pass, and intercepted a pass by Matt Ryan in a 30–28 loss at the Atlanta Falcons in the NFC Divisional Round. He was ranked 66th by his fellow players on the NFL Top 100 Players of 2013.

==== 2013 ====
The Seattle Seahawks' new defensive coordinator Dan Quinn retained Thomas and Kam Chancellor as the starting safeties and Richard Sherman and Brandon Browner as the starting cornerbacks after Gus Bradley accepted the head coaching position with the Jacksonville Jaguars.

In Week 4, he recorded seven solo tackles, deflected a pass, made an interception, and forced a fumble during a 23–20 win at the Houston Texans in Week 4. On October 28, 2013, Thomas collected a season-high ten solo tackles and made one pass deflection during a 14–9 victory at the St. Louis Rams in Week 9. The following week, he collected a season-high 12 combined tackles (eight solo) in the Seahawks' 27–24 win against the Tampa Bay Buccaneers in Week 10. On December 27, 2013, it was announced that Thomas was selected to the 2014 Pro Bowl, but was later replaced by Antrel Rolle due to his participation in Super Bowl XLVIII. Thomas started in all 16 games and recorded a career-high 105 combined tackles. (78 solo), nine pass deflections, five interceptions, and two forced fumbles. He earned First Team All-Pro honors for the second consecutive season. He finished third in voting for AP Defensive Player of the Year.

The Seattle Seahawks finished first in the NFC West with a 13–3 record and earned a first round bye. On January 11, 2014, Thomas recorded 11 combined tackles (seven solo) and broke up two passes as the Seahawks defeated the New Orleans Saints 23–15 in the Divisional Round. The following week, they defeated the San Francisco 49ers 23–17 in the NFC Championship Game. On February 2, 2014, Thomas started in Super Bowl XLVIII and made seven combined tackles and a pass deflection during a 43–8 victory against the Denver Broncos. He was ranked 17th by his fellow players on the NFL Top 100 Players of 2014.

==== 2014 ====
On April 28, 2014, the Seattle Seahawks signed Thomas to a four-year, $40 million contract extension with $27.72 million guaranteed and a signing bonus of $9.50 million.

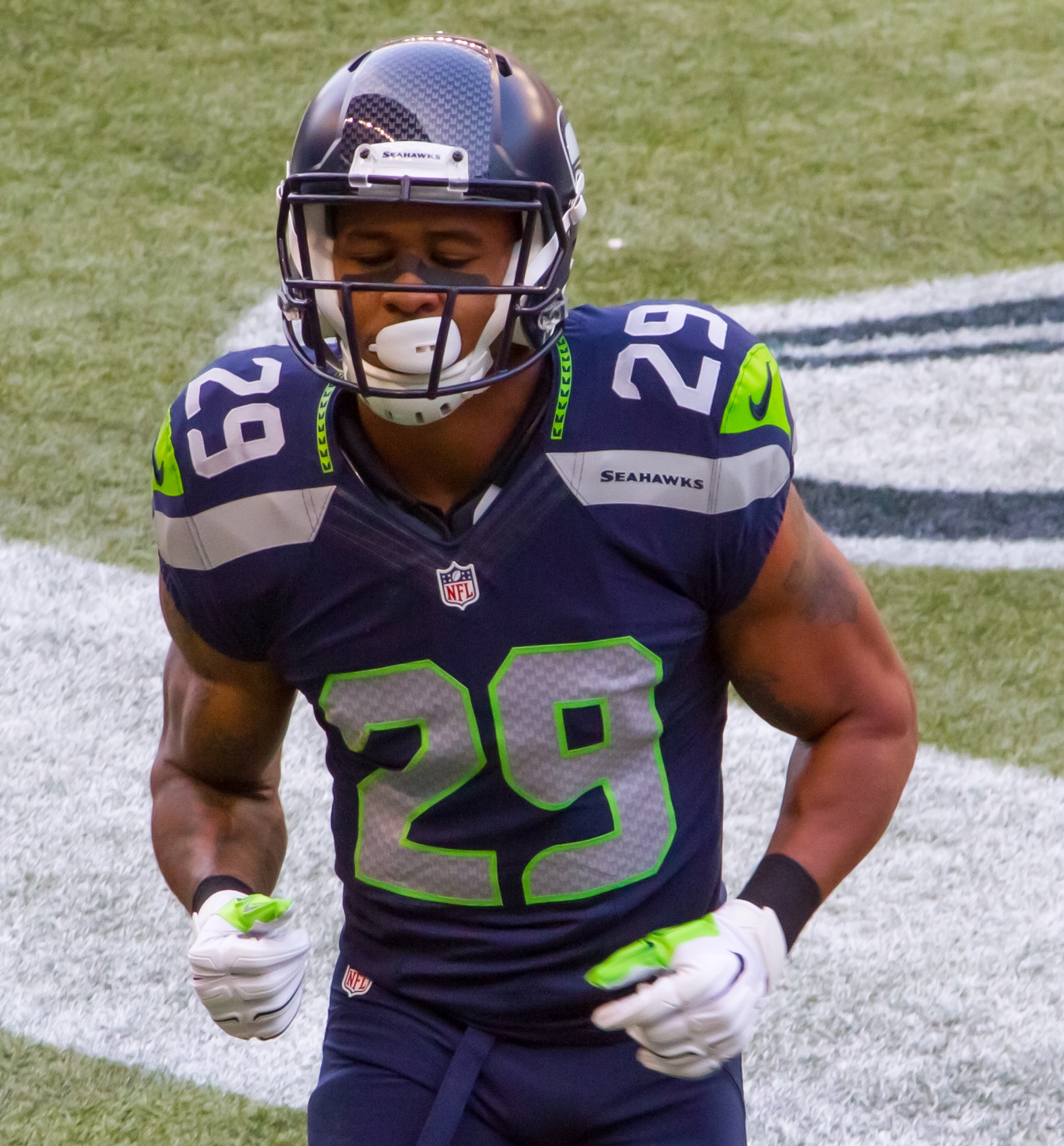
Thomas in 2014

On November 9, 2014, Thomas recorded six combined tackles, deflected a pass, and made his only interception of the season during a 38–17 victory against the New York Giants in Week 10. Thomas intercepted a pass by quarterback Eli Manning, that was intended for wide receiver Odell Beckham Jr., and returned it for a 47-yard gain in the fourth quarter. In Week 17, he collected a season-high 12 combined tackles (11 solo) in the Seahawks' 20–6 win against the St. Louis Rams. On December 23, 2015, Thomas was announced as a selection to play in the 2014 Pro Bowl. He finished the season with 97 combined tackles (71 solo), five pass deflections, three forced fumbles, and an interception in 16 games and 16 starts. He earned First Team All-Pro honors for the 2014 season.

The Seahawks had the top-ranked defense in the NFL in fewest points allowed for the third straight season and finished atop the NFC West with a 12–4 record. On January 10, 2015, Thomas collected 11 combined tackles (five solo), two passes defended, and a forced fumble as the Seahawks defeated the Carolina Panthers 31–17 in the Divisional Round. The following week, he made five combined tackles, but suffered a dislocated shoulder in the second quarter of their 28–22 victory against the Green Bay Packers in the NFC Championship. On February 1, 2015, Thomas recorded nine combined tackles in the Seahawks' 28–24 loss to the New England Patriots in Super Bowl XLIX. He was ranked 21st by his fellow players on the NFL Top 100 Players of 2015.

==== 2015 ====
On February 24, 2015, Thomas underwent surgery to repair his shoulder injury after he separated it during the NFC Championship Game. He was expected to miss 6–8 months and subsequently missed training camp and the preseason. The Seattle Seahawks' promoted defensive backs coach Kris Richard to defensive coordinator after Dan Quinn accepted the head coaching position with the Atlanta Falcons. Richard retained Thomas and Kam Chancellor as the starting safeties to begin the regular season.

He started in the Seattle Seahawks' season-opener at the St. Louis Rams and collected a season-high nine combined tackles in their 34–31 loss. On October 18, 2015, Thomas made four combined tackles, a season-high four pass deflections, and an interception during a 27–23 loss to the Carolina Panthers. He intercepted a pass by quarterback Cam Newton, that was originally intended for wide receiver Jerricho Cotchery, in the first quarter. On December 22, 2015, it was announced that Thomas was voted to the 2016 Pro Bowl, marking his fifth consecutive selection. Thomas elected not to play in the 2016 Pro Bowl in an attempt to get his body healthy and was replaced by Harrison Smith. He started in all 16 games in 2015 and recorded 64 combined tackles (45 solo), nine pass deflections, five interceptions, and one forced fumble. He was ranked 66th on the NFL Top 100 Players of 2016.

==== 2016 ====
On October 30, 2016, Thomas recorded two combined tackles, deflected a pass, and returned a fumble recovery for a touchdown during a 25–20 loss at the New Orleans Saints in Week 8. Thomas recovered a fumble and returned it for a 34-yard touchdown after Cliff Avril stripped the ball from Saints' running back Mark Ingram II during the first quarter. Afterwards, Thomas hugged a referee, the side judge Alex Kemp, and was flagged for unsportsmanlike conduct for doing it. In Week 10, he collected a season-high nine combined tackles in the Seahawks' 31–24 win at the New England Patriots. On November 20, 2016, Thomas made four combined tackles and a pass deflection before exiting in the third quarter of the Seahawks' 26–15 win against the Philadelphia Eagles due to a hamstring injury. His injury sidelined him for the Seahawks' Week 12 loss at the Tampa Bay Buccaneers and became the first game he missed during his career. The injury ended his streak of 107 consecutive regular season games. On December 4, 2016, Thomas suffered a broken tibia after he collided with teammate Kam Chancellor while breaking up a pass in the second quarter of the Seahawks' 40–7 victory against the Carolina Panthers in Week 13. He tweeted shortly after the injury that he was considering retirement. On December 6, 2016, the Seattle Seahawks officially placed Thomas on injured reserve. Before being placed on IR, Thomas was leading all safeties in Pro Bowl votes making it likely he would have gone to his sixth straight. He finished the 2016 season with 48 combined tackles (24 solo), a career-high ten pass deflections, two interceptions, a fumble recovery, and a touchdown in 11 games and 11 starts. Despite the injury, Thomas was still ranked 30th by his peers on the NFL Top 100 Players of 2017.

==== 2017 ====
Thomas started in the Seattle Seahawks' season-opener at the Green Bay Packers and collected a season-high 11 combined tackles (seven solo) and a pass deflection in their 17–9 loss. He also had an interception off Aaron Rodgers that was negated by an offsides penalty on defensive end Michael Bennett. In Week 5, Thomas piled up seven tackles, intercepted Jared Goff, and forced a fumble at the goal line on Todd Gurley in a 16–10 win over the Los Angeles Rams, earning him NFC Defensive Player of the Week. In Week 8, against the Houston Texans, Thomas recorded a 78-yard interception return for a touchdown off Deshaun Watson, the second pick-six of his career. Thomas would also add five tackles in the 41–38 victory, although he suffered a hamstring injury late in the fourth quarter. On December 19, 2017, Thomas was named to his sixth Pro Bowl. Thomas was ranked #48 by his fellow players on the NFL Top 100 Players of 2018.

==== 2018 ====
At the start of the 2018 season, Thomas did not report to training camp expressing that he would hold out until the Seahawks either renegotiated his current contract or traded him to another team. After missing all of training camp and the preseason, Thomas reported to the Seahawks just days prior to Week 1 and was activated to the roster.

On September 9, 2018, during the season opener against the Denver Broncos, Thomas recorded an interception from quarterback Case Keenum just five minutes into the game. This marked his 9th consecutive season recording an interception. In Week 3, against the Dallas Cowboys, Thomas recorded his second career game with two interceptions in the 24–13 victory.

During a Week 4 matchup against the Arizona Cardinals, Thomas was carted off the field in the fourth quarter with a lower leg injury with an air cast attached to it, and gave "the finger" to the Seahawks' bench. It proved to be the last time he would take the field in a Seahawks uniform; he had suffered a broken leg, ending his 2018 season. He was placed on injured reserve on October 2, 2018.

=== Baltimore Ravens ===
On March 13, 2019, Thomas signed a four-year, $55 million contract with the Baltimore Ravens with $32 million guaranteed. He had agreed in principle to sign a one-year, $12 million deal with the Kansas City Chiefs a day earlier; the Chiefs were about to ferry him to Kansas City on a private jet when the Ravens outbid them at the last minute.

After years of playing in the Seahawks' relatively simple Cover 3 scheme, Thomas initially found it hard to adjust to the Ravens' more complicated system. However, during the season opener against the Miami Dolphins, Thomas intercepted quarterback Ryan Fitzpatrick on the Ravens' first defensive series of the season, prompting one defensive coach to yell, "We got Earl Thomas!" It marked the 10th consecutive season in which Thomas recorded at least one interception. The Ravens went on to win 59–10.

During the Ravens' Week 4 game against the Cleveland Browns, Thomas lost some goodwill with Ravens fans when he missed a chance to stop an 88-yard touchdown burst by Nick Chubb. Thomas said he pulled up at midfield because he had pulled a hamstring on a similar play during his days in Seattle (in 2017 against the Houston Texans), and did not want to risk injury.

On October 6, 2019, in a game against the Pittsburgh Steelers, Thomas made a helmet-to-helmet hit which knocked Steelers QB Mason Rudolph unconscious. Rudolph did not return for the rest of the game. On October 21, Thomas was fined $21,000 for the hit. In week 9 against the New England Patriots, Thomas recorded his second interception of the season, picking off Tom Brady in the 37–20 win. In Week 10 against the Cincinnati Bengals, Thomas recovered a fumble forced by teammate Chuck Clark on running back Giovani Bernard in the 49–13 win. In Week 14 against the Buffalo Bills, Thomas recorded a team high 7 tackles and sacked Josh Allen during the 24–17 win, clinching a playoff berth. Thomas earned a Pro Bowl nomination for the 2019 season.

In the divisional round of the playoffs against the Tennessee Titans, Thomas recorded a team-high seven tackles and sacked quarterback Ryan Tannehill during the 28–12 loss. He was named to the Pro Football Hall of Fame All-Decade Team for the 2010s. He was ranked 75th by his fellow players on the NFL Top 100 Players of 2020.

On August 21, 2020, Thomas and fellow safety Chuck Clark got into an altercation during practice after Thomas missed a coverage that allowed Mark Andrews to score a long touchdown. Thomas then punched Clark and was sent home. After the Ravens advised Thomas not to come to practice on August 22, they released him the next day for conduct detrimental to the team, or, as the team put it, "personal conduct that has adversely affected the Baltimore Ravens". His release came after players told coach John Harbaugh and general manager Eric DeCosta they did not want Thomas back on the team. Harbaugh consulted the team's "Leadership Council" of veteran players, and only one of them wanted Thomas to return. No other team signed him during the season.

According to an article by The Athletic, even though Thomas had made seven of the last nine Pro Bowls, he had developed a reputation for being "uncoachable". According to a number of his former Seahawks teammates and coaches, they had been able to manage the situation until 2017, when Chancellor suffered a career-ending neck injury and Sherman had his season prematurely ended by a ruptured Achilles tendon. In what proved to be a warning sign, Thomas put out feelers to the Cowboys, which was dismissed at the time as "Earl being Earl". By 2018, he frequently refused to practice, apparently to protect his value in free agency.

While in Baltimore, Thomas never really became a part of the Ravens' locker room culture. He was often fined for skipping meetings or showing up late and left the team on his own at least twice. During the 2020 preseason, Thomas became increasingly surly and withdrawn, frequently skipping meetings and walk-throughs. The altercation with Clark happened in part because he believed if Thomas had taken part in walk-throughs, he wouldn't have blown the coverage. According to The Athletic, Thomas' reputation for being uncoachable and a poor teammate was why no other team signed him after his release by the Ravens. Reportedly, the Houston Texans considered signing him, but decided against it after several of their players objected to possibly being his teammate.

=== Retirement ===
Thomas was a Pro Football Hall of Fame semi-finalist in 2024 and again in 2025.

== NFL career statistics ==
Legend
| | Won the Super Bowl |
| **Bold** | Career high |

=== Regular season ===
| Year | Team | GP | Tackles | | | | Fumbles | | | Interceptions | | | | | |
| Year | Team | GP | Cmb | Solo | Ast | Sck | FF | FR | Yds | Int | Yds | Avg | Lng | TD | PD |
|---|---|---|---|---|---|---|---|---|---|---|---|---|---|---|---|
| 2010 | SEA | 16 | 76 | 64 | 12 | 0.0 | 1 | 0 | 0 | **5** | 68 | 13.6 | 34 | 0 | 7 |
| 2011 | SEA | 16 | 98 | 69 | 29 | 0.0 | 1 | **2** | 0 | 2 | 19 | 9.5 | 11 | 0 | 7 |
| 2012 | SEA | 16 | 66 | 42 | 24 | 0.0 | 1 | 1 | 0 | 3 | 80 | 26.7 | 57 | **1** | 9 |
| 2013 | SEA | 16 | **105** | **78** | 27 | 0.0 | 2 | 0 | 0 | **5** | 9 | 1.8 | 11 | 0 | 9 |
| 2014 | SEA | 16 | 97 | 71 | 26 | 0.0 | **4** | 1 | 0 | 1 | 47 | 47.0 | 47 | 0 | 5 |
| 2015 | SEA | 16 | 64 | 45 | 19 | 0.0 | 1 | 0 | 0 | **5** | 67 | 13.4 | 32 | 0 | 9 |
| 2016 | SEA | 11 | 48 | 24 | 24 | 0.0 | 0 | 1 | **34** | 2 | 5 | 2.5 | 5 | **1** | **10** |
| 2017 | SEA | 14 | 88 | 56 | **32** | 0.0 | 1 | 0 | 0 | 2 | **97** | **48.5** | **78** | **1** | 7 |
| 2018 | SEA | 4 | 22 | 16 | 6 | 0.0 | 0 | 0 | 0 | 3 | 25 | 8.3 | 25 | 0 | 5 |
| 2019 | BAL | 15 | 49 | 32 | 17 | **2.0** | 1 | 1 | 6 | 2 | 38 | 19.0 | 25 | 0 | 4 |
| Total | | 140 | 713 | 497 | 216 | 2.0 | 11 | 6 | 40 | 30 | 455 | 15.2 | 78 | 3 | 72 |

=== Postseason ===
| Year | Team | GP | Tackles | | | | Fumbles | | | Interceptions | | | | | |
| Year | Team | GP | Cmb | Solo | Ast | Sck | FF | FR | Yds | Int | Yds | Avg | Lng | TD | PD |
|---|---|---|---|---|---|---|---|---|---|---|---|---|---|---|---|
| 2010 | SEA | 2 | 12 | 12 | 0 | 0.0 | 0 | 0 | 0 | 0 | 0 | 0.0 | 0 | 0 | 1 |
| 2012 | SEA | 2 | 8 | 3 | 5 | 0.0 | 0 | 0 | 0 | **2** | **1** | **0.5** | **2** | 0 | 2 |
| 2013 | SEA | 3 | 24 | **17** | 7 | 0.0 | 0 | 0 | 0 | 0 | 0 | 0.0 | 0 | 0 | **3** |
| 2014 | SEA | 3 | **25** | **17** | **8** | 0.0 | **1** | 0 | 0 | 0 | 0 | 0.0 | 0 | 0 | 2 |
| 2015 | SEA | 2 | 13 | 5 | **8** | 0.0 | 0 | 0 | 0 | 0 | 0 | 0.0 | 0 | 0 | 1 |
| 2016 | SEA | 0 | Did not play due to injury | | | | | | | | | | | | |
| 2018 | SEA | 0 | Did not play due to injury | | | | | | | | | | | | |
| 2019 | BAL | 1 | 7 | 6 | 1 | **1.0** | 0 | 0 | 0 | 0 | 0 | 0.0 | 0 | 0 | 0 |
| Total | | 13 | 89 | 60 | 29 | 1.0 | 1 | 0 | 0 | 2 | 1 | 0.5 | 2 | 0 | 9 |

== Personal life ==
On May 6, 2020, it was reported by TMZ that on April 13, Thomas was allegedly held at gunpoint by his wife Nina after she found him and his brother, Seth Thomas, in bed with other women. Nina Thomas' arrest was reported the following day.

In November 2020, Nina Thomas filed for divorce. She was later granted a restraining order against her husband.

On May 6, 2022, an arrest warrant was issued against Thomas after he violated a court protective order by sending messages to a woman about her and her children. He was arrested in Orange, Texas, on May 13, 2022.

On August 11, 2022, Thomas's house in Orange burned down. An investigation found that the fire was caused by a lightning strike during a thunderstorm.

== See also ==
- Legion of Boom
- List of Texas Longhorns football All-Americans
- List of Seattle Seahawks first-round draft picks
