= J. D. Walton =

American football player (born 1987)

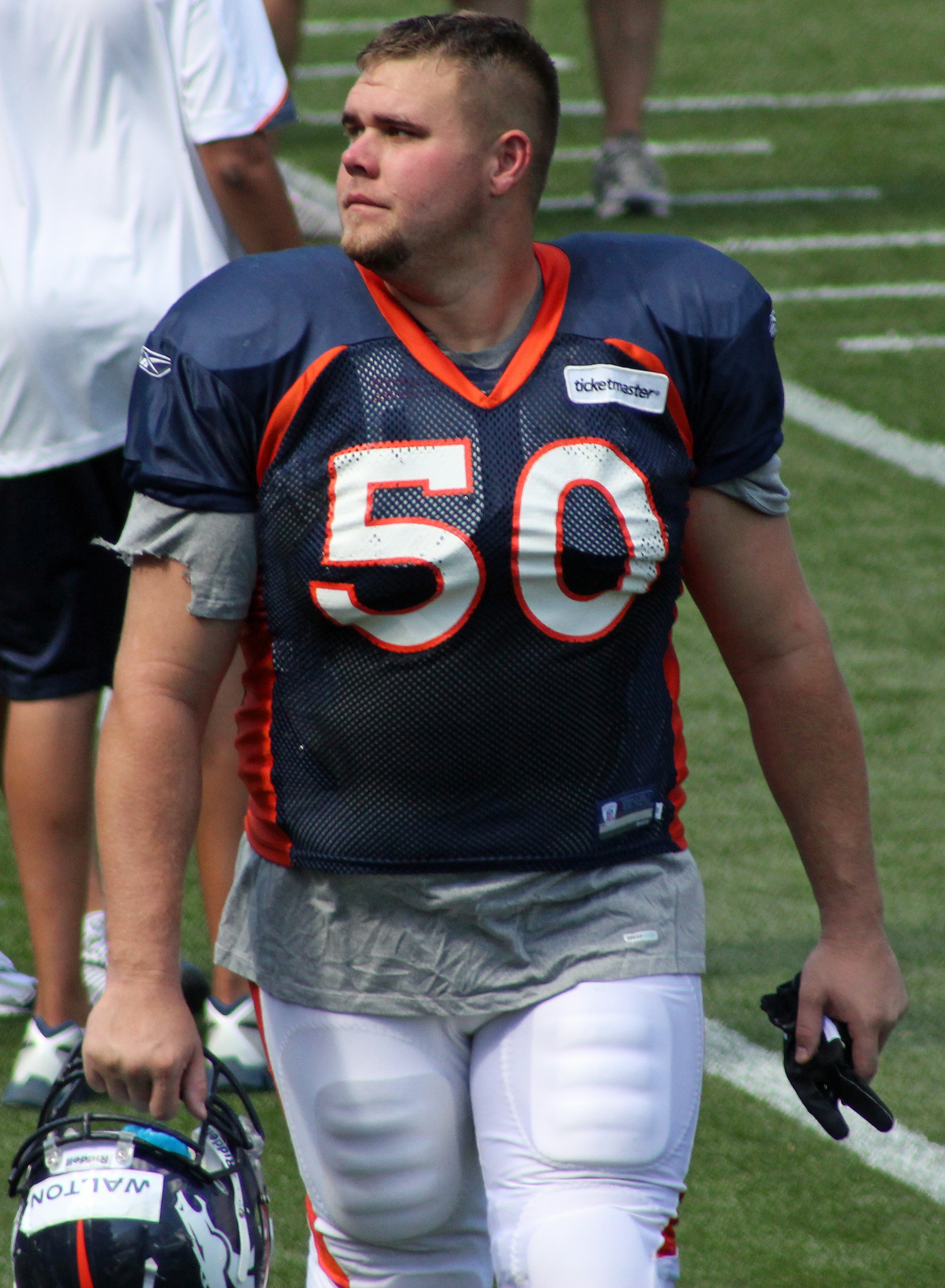
- Walton with the Denver Broncos in 2011

No. 50, 55, 66
- Position: Center

Personal information
- Born: March 24, 1987 (age 39); Lawton, Oklahoma, U.S.
- Listed height: 6 ft 3 in (1.91 m)
- Listed weight: 310 lb (141 kg)

Career information
- High school: Allen (Allen, Texas)
- College: Baylor
- NFL draft: 2010: 3rd round, 80th overall pick

Career history
- Denver Broncos (2010–2013); Washington Redskins (2013); New York Giants (2014); Miami Dolphins (2015)*; San Diego Chargers (2015)
- * Offseason or practice squad member only

Awards and highlights
- First-team All-American (2009); Second-team All-Big 12 (2009)

Career NFL statistics
- Games played: 56
- Games started: 52
- Stats at Pro Football Reference

Justin Daniel Walton (born March 24, 1987) is an American former professional football player who was a center in the National Football League (NFL). He was selected by the Denver Broncos in the third round of the 2010 NFL draft and was also a member of the Washington Redskins, New York Giants, Miami Dolphins and San Diego Chargers. He played college football for the Baylor Bears.

== Early life ==
Walton attended Allen High School in Texas, where he was a first-team all-district and first-team all-county offensive lineman. He recorded 79 pancake blocks to lead District 9-5A as senior, as he helped Allen to win the bi-district championship. In his junior year, he was a second-team all-district pick after recording 59 pancake blocks. Walton was a teammate of former Arkansas quarterback Casey Dick.

Considered only a two-star recruit by Rivals.com, Walton was not listed among the top offensive line prospects in the class of 2005. However, he received 14 Division I scholarship offers and eventually picked Arizona State over Colorado State, Iowa State, SMU, and Utah.

== College career ==
After redshirting his freshman year at Arizona State, Walton decided to transfer to his home state and enrolled at Baylor University. Due to NCAA transfer rules, he had to sit out his first year at Baylor.

Finally playing in his sophomore year, Walton started every game at center—one of three Baylor offensive linemen to do so, joining Dan Gay and James Barnard—for the Bears in 2007. He played 911 snaps, most by a Baylor offensive performer. The Bears' offensive line yielded only 21 quarterback sacks, the fewest since 1995.

In his junior year, started all 12 games at center and earned 2008 honorable mention All-Big 12 by the Associated Press. Baylor's line, which also featured Jason Smith, who was the No. 2 pick of the 2009 NFL draft, generated 2,349 rushing yards, the most at the school since 1981, and 29 touchdowns.

Walton entered his senior year as an Outland Trophy and Rimington Trophy candidate. He again started all games for the Bears and has now 36 consecutive starts. Walton was a finalist for the 2009 Rimington Trophy, but eventually lost out to Maurkice Pouncey. However, he was named a 2009 College Football All-American by the Associated Press, the first Baylor center to do so since Aubrey Schulz in 1974.

He was invited to play in the Senior Bowl and East-West Shrine games.

== Professional career ==
=== Pre-draft ===
Walton was rated the No. 1-rated senior center in the 2010 NFL draft by ESPN analyst Mel Kiper Jr. He drew comparisons to Jake Grove.

Pre-draft measurables
Height	Weight	Arm length	Hand span	40-yard dash	20-yard shuttle	Broad jump
6 2 5/8	300 lb (136 kg)	33 3/8	9 1/4	5.24 s	4.69 s	8 ft 5 in (2.57 m)
All values from NFL Combine

=== Denver Broncos ===
Walton was selected by the Denver Broncos in the third round (80th overall) of the 2010 NFL draft. He was the second center to be picked in the draft, after first rounder Maurkice Pouncey. Walton signed a four-year contract on June 17, 2010. On September 30, 2012, Walton suffered a dislocated ankle during a game against the Oakland Raiders, and was subsequently placed on injured reserve. On December 17, 2013, he was waived by the Denver Broncos.

=== Washington Redskins ===
Walton was claimed off waivers by the Washington Redskins on December 18, 2013.

=== New York Giants ===
Walton was signed by the New York Giants on March 12, 2014. He was released on March 2, 2015.

=== Miami Dolphins ===
Walton signed with the Miami Dolphins on March 19, 2015. On August 30, 2015, he was released by the Dolphins.

=== San Diego Chargers ===
The San Diego Chargers signed Walton on September 29, 2015.
