= Jeremy Beal =

American gridiron football player (born 1987)

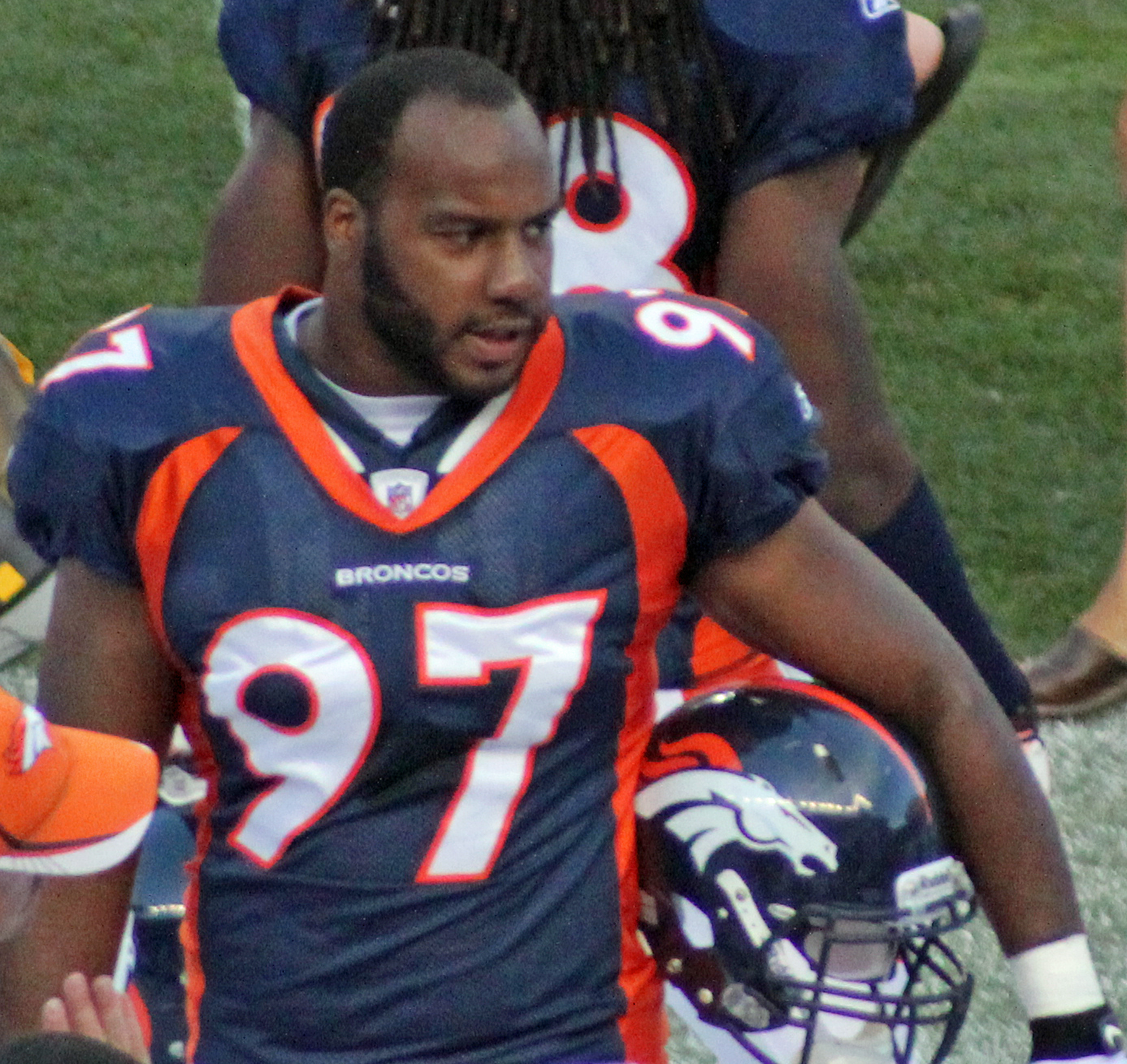
- Beal with the Denver Broncos in 2011

No. 93, 97
- Position: Defensive end

Personal information
- Born: December 2, 1987 (age 38); Carrollton, Texas, U.S.
- Listed height: 6 ft 3 in (1.91 m)
- Listed weight: 276 lb (125 kg)

Career information
- High school: Creekview (Carrollton)
- College: Oklahoma
- NFL draft: 2011: 7th round, 247th overall pick

Career history
- Denver Broncos (2011–2012); Saskatchewan Roughriders (2014)*
- * Offseason or practice squad member only

Awards and highlights
- Second-team All-American (2010); Third-team All-American (2009); Big 12 Defensive Lineman of the Year (2010); 2× First-team All-Big 12 (2008, 2010); Second-team All-Big 12 (2009)
- Stats at Pro Football Reference

Jeremy Beal (born December 2, 1987) is an American former professional football player who was a defensive end for the Denver Broncos of the National Football League (NFL). He played college football for the Oklahoma Sooners and was considered one of the top defensive end prospects in the 2011 NFL draft before being selected in the seventh round by the Broncos. He was also a member of the Saskatchewan Roughriders.

== Early life ==
Beal attended Creekview High School in Carrollton, Texas, where he played high school football. As a senior, he was an all-state linebacker after recording 127 tackles, two sacks, and one interception return for a touchdown.

Regarded as a four-star recruit by Rivals.com, he was listed as the No. 19 strongside defensive end prospect in the class of 2006.

== College career ==
Beal played college football at the University of Oklahoma. After being redshirted as a freshman in 2006, Beal was moved to defensive end and recorded 21 tackles and had a sack as a redshirt freshman in 2007. Beal became a starter as a sophomore in 2008 and earned first-team All-Big 12 by the Associated Press after recording a team high 8.5 sacks with 54 tackles. As a junior in 2009 Beal recorded 61 tackles, 11 sacks, and an interception.

== Professional career ==
Pre-draft measurables
Height	Weight	Arm length	Hand span	Wingspan	40-yard dash	10-yard split	20-yard split	20-yard shuttle	Three-cone drill	Vertical jump	Broad jump	Bench press
6 ft 2 1/4 in (1.89 m)	262 lb (119 kg)	33 1/8 in (0.84 m)	9 7/8 in (0.25 m)	6 ft 7 3/8 in (2.02 m)	5.16 s	1.85 s	3.03 s	4.41 s	6.95 s	28.5 in (0.72 m)	8 ft 10 in (2.69 m)	22 reps
All values from 2011 NFL Scouting Combine/Pro Day

=== Denver Broncos ===
Beal was selected in the seventh round by the Denver Broncos of the 2011 NFL draft as the 247th overall selection.

On August 31, 2013, the Broncos waived Beal.

=== Saskatchewan Roughriders ===
Beal signed with the Saskatchewan Roughriders on June 19, 2014. He was released on June 21, 2014.
