= Ndamukong Suh =

American football player (born 1987)

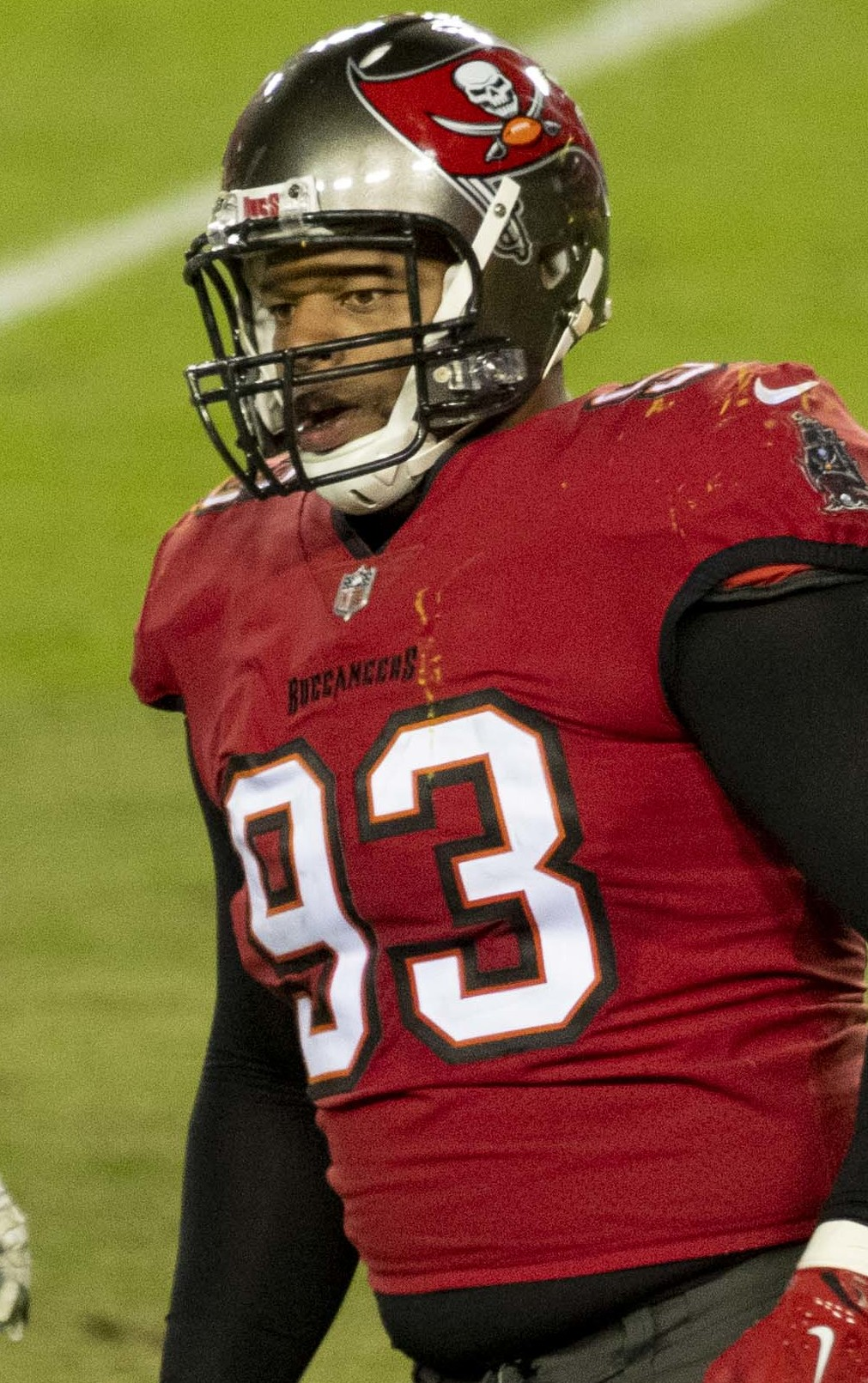
- Suh with the Tampa Bay Buccaneers in 2021

No. 90, 93, 74
- Position: Defensive tackle

Personal information
- Born: January 6, 1987 (age 39); Portland, Oregon, U.S.
- Listed height: 6 ft 4 in (1.93 m)
- Listed weight: 313 lb (142 kg)

Career information
- High school: Grant (Portland)
- College: Nebraska (2005–2009)
- NFL draft: 2010: 1st round, 2nd overall pick

Career history
- Detroit Lions (2010–2014); Miami Dolphins (2015–2017); Los Angeles Rams (2018); Tampa Bay Buccaneers (2019–2021); Philadelphia Eagles (2022)

Awards and highlights
- Super Bowl champion (LV); NFL Defensive Rookie of the Year (2010); 3× First-team All-Pro (2010, 2013, 2014); 2× Second-team All-Pro (2012, 2016); 5× Pro Bowl (2010, 2012–2014, 2016); NFL 2010s All-Decade Team; PFWA All-Rookie Team (2010); Outland Trophy (2009); Lombardi Award (2009); Bronko Nagurski Trophy (2009); Chuck Bednarik Award (2009); Bill Willis Trophy (2009); AP College Football Player of the Year (2009); Big 12 Defensive Player of the Year (2009); Big 12 Defensive Lineman of the Year (2009); Unanimous All-American (2009); 2× first-team All-Big 12 (2008, 2009); First-team AP All-Time All-American (2025); Nebraska Cornhuskers No. 93 retired

Career NFL statistics
- Total tackles: 600
- Sacks: 71.5
- Forced fumbles: 5
- Fumble recoveries: 9
- Pass deflections: 38
- Interceptions: 1
- Defensive touchdowns: 3
- Stats at Pro Football Reference
- College Football Hall of Fame

Ndamukong Ngwa Suh (/ɪnˈdɑːməkɪn ˈsuː/ in-DAH-mə-kin SOO, born January 6, 1987) is an American former professional football player who played defensive tackle in the National Football League (NFL) for 13 seasons. He played college football for the Nebraska Cornhuskers, earning unanimous All-American honors in 2009. Suh was selected by the Detroit Lions second overall in the 2010 NFL draft. He also played for the Miami Dolphins, Los Angeles Rams, Tampa Bay Buccaneers, and Philadelphia Eagles. Suh played in three Super Bowls during his career: Super Bowl LIII with the Rams, Super Bowl LV with the Buccaneers, and Super Bowl LVII with the Eagles.

As a college senior, Suh became one of the most decorated players in college football history. He won numerous awards, including the Associated Press College Football Player of the Year Award, Bronko Nagurski Trophy, Chuck Bednarik Award, Lombardi Award, and Outland Trophy.

During his time with the Lions, Suh was selected to four All-Pro and Pro Bowl teams and was awarded Defensive Rookie of the Year in 2010. In 2015, Suh became the highest-paid defensive player in NFL history, having signed a six-year contract with the Dolphins, worth in excess of $114 million, with nearly $60 million fully guaranteed, but he was released after just three seasons. Suh was often criticized for his aggressive style of play and lack of sportsmanship. Suh was one of four defensive tackles named to the NFL 2010s All-Decade Team.

== Early life ==
Suh was born in Portland, Oregon on January 6, 1987. He attended Grant High School in Portland, where he was a four-sport star in football, basketball, soccer and track and field. Suh played as a two-way lineman for the Grant Generals. He earned first-team All-PIL honors on both offense and defense as a junior and was an honorable-mention All-state pick. As a senior, Suh collected 65 tackles, 10 sacks, and four fumble recoveries, earning him Parade magazine high school All-America honors, the 2004 Portland Interscholastic League Defensive Player of the Year and a Class 4A first-team all-state selection. Suh also played in the 2005 U.S. Army All-American Bowl. In basketball, he earned honorable-mention All-League honors as a junior and senior.

Also a track and field athlete, Suh was one of the state's top performers in the shot put. He was the district shot put champion in 2004 and won the OSAA Class 4A shot put title in 2005 with a school-record throw of 18.71 meters (61 ft, 4 in). For his all-around athletic accomplishments, Suh was a finalist for the Portland Tribune's Athlete of the Year.

Considered a four-star recruit by Rivals.com, Suh was the sixth ranked defensive tackle in the United States. Recruited by many, he took official visits to Nebraska, Mississippi State, Oregon State, Miami (FL), and California, before committing to the Nebraska Cornhuskers on January 20, 2005.

College recruiting
Name	Hometown	School	Height	Weight	40^{‡}	Commit date
Ndamukong Suh; DT	Portland, Oregon	Grant HS	6 ft 4 in (1.93 m)	275 lb (125 kg)	4.9	Jan 20, 2005
Ndamukong Suh; DT	Recruit ratings: Scout: Rivals:					
Overall recruit ranking: Scout: 9 (DT), 10 (school) Rivals: 6 (DT), 1 (OR), 5 (school)
Note: In many cases, Scout, Rivals, 247Sports, On3, and ESPN may conflict in their listings of height and weight.; In these cases, the average was taken. ESPN grades are on a 100-point scale.; Sources: "2005 Nebraska Football Commitment List". Rivals.; "2005 Nebraska Football Commits". Scout.; "Scout.com Team Recruiting Rankings". Scout.; "2005 Team Ranking". Rivals.com.

== College career ==
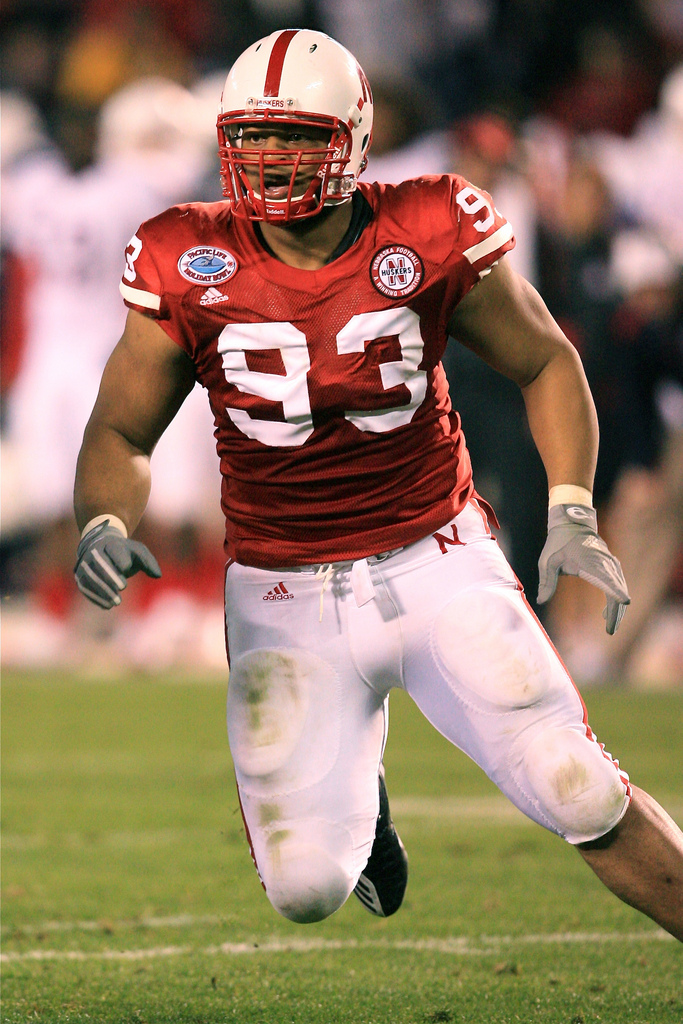
Suh playing in the 2009 Holiday Bowl

Suh attended the University of Nebraska–Lincoln, where he played for the Nebraska Cornhuskers football team from 2005 to 2009. As a true freshman in 2005, Suh played in the first two games before missing the rest of the season after undergoing knee surgery. He received a medical redshirt.

In 2006, Suh played in all 14 games as a backup defensive lineman and earned freshman All-Big 12 honors from The Sporting News. Despite coming off the bench, he finished the year with 19 total tackles, and ranked among the team leaders in tackles for loss (8) and quarterback sacks (3 1/2). As a sophomore, Suh started in 11 of the Cornhuskers' 12 games and recorded 34 total tackles.

As a junior in 2008, Suh recorded a team-high 76 tackles, 7.5 sacks, 19 tackles for loss, two interceptions (both returned for touchdowns, which co-led the NCAA), and a touchdown reception while playing fullback. He became the first Nebraska defensive lineman to lead the team in tackles since 1973. Suh earned First-team All-Big 12 honors in 2008, becoming the first Nebraska interior defensive lineman to earn those honors since Steve Warren in 1999. Suh was also an honorable mention All-American.

In 2009, Suh registered 85 tackles, 12 quarterback sacks, 28 quarterback hurries, 20.5 tackles for loss, 10 pass breakups, three blocked kicks, and an interception. He had 12 tackles (seven for losses, a school single-game record) and 4 1/2 sacks in a 13–12 loss to the Texas Longhorns in the Big 12 Championship Game, for which he received game MVP honors. Suh helped Huskers defense rank first nationally in scoring defense (10.4 ppg), tied for second in total sacks (44), first in pass efficiency defense (87.3), seventh in total defense (272.0 ypg), ninth in rushing defense (93.1 ypg) and 18th in passing defense (178.9 ypg). He also played all four quarters versus Arizona in the 2009 Holiday Bowl, helping Nebraska record the first shutout in the Holiday Bowl's 32-year history, as well as the first shutout in school bowl history. Suh earned unanimous first-team All-Big 12 honors and the Big-12 Defensive Player of the Year. Nationally, he was named the Associated Press College Football Player of the Year, the recipient of the Bill Willis Trophy, Bronko Nagurski Trophy, Chuck Bednarik Award, Lombardi Award, and Outland Trophy, and was recognized as a unanimous first-team All-American. Suh was a finalist for the Lott Trophy, Walter Camp Award, and Heisman Trophy.

=== Awards ===
In October 2009, Suh was named to The Sporting News and CBS Sports midseason All-American team. On November 10, he was selected one of four finalists for the 2009 Lombardi Award, the first Cornhusker to receive this honor since Dominic Raiola in 2000. On November 24, Suh was named one of three finalists for the 2009 Outland Trophy, alongside Mike Iupati and Russell Okung. On December 3, Suh was named as one of five finalists for the Walter Camp Award. He was also named to the 2009 Outland Trophy watch list after beginning season at No. 3 on Rivals.com′s preseason defensive tackle power ranking.

On December 7, 2009, Suh was named a finalist for the Heisman Trophy. Later that evening, he was named the 2009 Bronko Nagurski Trophy winner as the top defensive player in the nation. CBS Sportsline also named Suh their Defensive Player of the Year and on December 9, the Touchdown Club of Columbus named Suh the winner of the Bill Willis Trophy. That same evening, Suh won the Lombardi Award for the top collegiate lineman or linebacker. On December 11, at the ESPN College Football Awards show, he was selected as the winner of the Chuck Bednarik Award as the nation's best defensive player and took home the Outland Trophy for the best interior lineman. Suh finished fourth in the Heisman race, accumulating 815 points, the most by a fourth-place finisher for the Heisman Trophy in its history. He was also one of four unanimous selections to the AP First-team All-America in 2009. Suh was named the 2009 AP Player of Year, becoming the first defensive player to receive the award in its history.

On January 14, 2026, Suh was inducted into the College Football Hall of Fame.

== Professional career ==
=== 2010 NFL draft ===
Suh was widely considered to be one of the best prospects available in the draft. ESPN.com's draft analyst Mel Kiper, Jr., described Suh as "maybe the most dominating defensive tackle I've seen in 32 years" and projected him to go #1 overall. Suh was seen as an ideal fit at either defensive tackle in a 4–3 defense or as a defensive end in a 3–4 defense.

For off-the-field marketing activities, Suh signed with The Agency Sports Management & Marketing, where Russ Spielman served as lead agent. At the NFL Combine, Suh bench pressed 225 pounds 32 times and had a 35 1/2 inch vertical leap, the highest for a defensive tackle since Al Lucas (36 in) in 2000.

Pre-draft measurables
Height	Weight	Arm length	Hand span	40-yard dash	10-yard split	20-yard split	20-yard shuttle	Three-cone drill	Vertical jump	Broad jump	Bench press	Wonderlic
6 ft 3 7/8 in (1.93 m)	307 lb (139 kg)	33 1/2 in (0.85 m)	10 1/4 in (0.26 m)	4.98 s	1.59 s	2.81 s	4.44 s	7.21 s	35.5 in (0.90 m)	8 ft 9 in (2.67 m)	32 reps	20
All values from the NFL Combine

Before the NFL draft, Suh signed with Maximum Sports Management and agent Roosevelt Barnes. This caused moderate concern for many teams who were hoping to draft him, as this was the same agent who represented Michael Crabtree. Crabtree was the longest 2009 NFL draft first round contract hold out, waiting over six weeks into the NFL season before signing with the San Francisco 49ers.

Despite the concerns, Suh was selected in the first round with the second overall pick in the 2010 NFL draft by the Detroit Lions, becoming the first defensive lineman selected in the first round by the team since Luther Elliss in 1995. Suh was the highest selected Cornhusker defender since Neil Smith in 1988.

=== Detroit Lions ===
==== 2010 ====
On August 3, Suh agreed to a five-year, $68 million contract with the Lions, including $40 million guaranteed. On September 12, Suh had his first sack on Chicago Bears quarterback Jay Cutler. On October 10 against the St. Louis Rams, Suh recorded his first and only NFL interception off Sam Bradford. Three weeks later, Suh scored the first touchdown of his NFL career against the Washington Redskins on a recovery of a Rex Grossman fumble.

After an injury to Lions kicker Jason Hanson, the Lions had Suh attempt an extra point on November 7, 2010, against the New York Jets. However, he missed the extra point when the ball hit the right upright, and it proved to be costly since the Lions lost to the Jets 23–20 in overtime.

For the 2010 season, Suh led the Lions, all rookies, and all defensive tackles in sacks with 10. He was picked as a starter for the Pro Bowl, becoming the first Lions rookie since Barry Sanders to be picked as a Pro Bowl starter. However, Suh missed the game due to shoulder surgery. On January 25, 2011, he was named to the All-Pro Team. Suh was also named the Sporting News Rookie of the Year, the Pro Football Weekly and Pro Football Writers of America Rookie of the Year, the Pepsi NFL Rookie of the Year, and the AP Defensive Rookie of the Year. Suh was named to the NFL All-Rookie Team. He was ranked 51st by his fellow players on the NFL Top 100 Players of 2011.

His rookie year saw the beginning of what would take Suh to a league record amount of fines for on-the-field behavior. He was fined $7,500 in a preseason game against the Cleveland Browns for a facemask of Jake Delhomme, fined $5,000 for using an opponent as leverage on a field goal in a week 9 game against the Jets, and fined $15,000 in a week 13 game against the Bears for unnecessary roughness against quarterback Jay Cutler.

==== 2011 ====
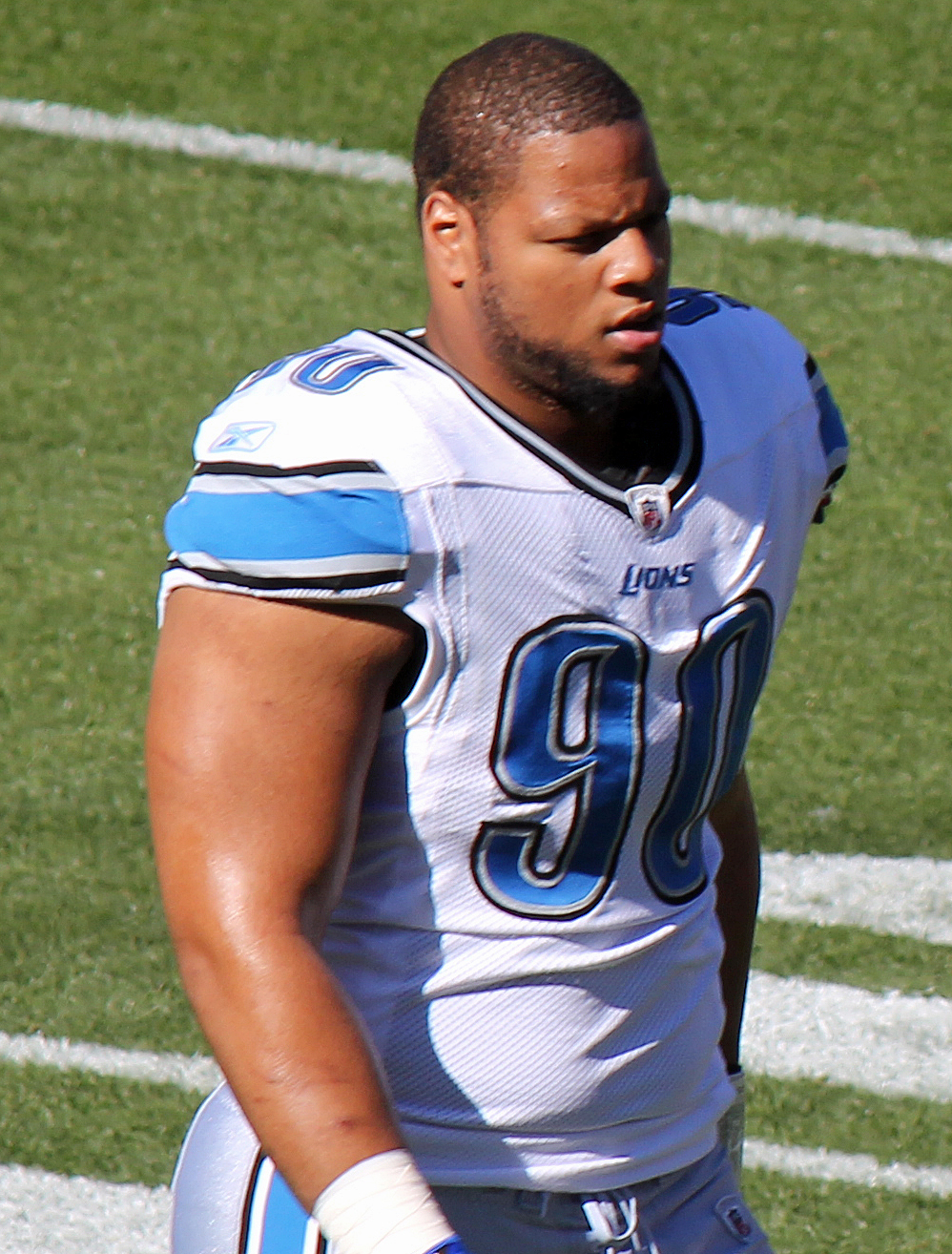
Suh in 2011

During the third quarter of the Lions' Thanksgiving game against the Green Bay Packers, Suh pushed Packers' guard Evan Dietrich-Smith's head into the ground three times, then stomped on his arm. All of this took place after the whistle was blown. Suh was penalized for unnecessary roughness and ejected from the game. The resulting penalty gave the Packers an automatic first down. The Packers scored a touchdown two plays later, giving them a 14–0 lead and an eventual 27–15 victory.

Initially, Suh denied stomping on Dietrich-Smith, saying he was only trying to get his balance back. However, on Friday morning, the Lions issued a statement calling Suh's actions "unacceptable". Within hours, Suh wrote on his Facebook page that he "made a mistake" a day before and intended to learn from it. Fox Sports NFL rules analyst and former vice president of officiating Mike Pereira said that based on his knowledge of league discipline, "the question won't be if the NFL will suspend Suh, but when—and for how many games". He drew parallels between Suh's actions and those of Albert Haynesworth, who drew a five-game suspension—the longest suspension for an on-field incident in modern NFL history—for stomping on Andre Gurode's head in 2006.

On November 29, the NFL suspended Suh for two games without pay which was $165,294 in lost wages. In announcing the decision, Roger Goodell noted that it was the fifth time Suh had been disciplined for on-field conduct. Suh appealed the decision, and the NFL held an expedited hearing before former Oakland Raiders coach Art Shell, so that a decision could be handed down before the Lions' next game, on December 4, against the New Orleans Saints. The appeal was turned down on December 2, forcing Suh to sit out the game against the Saints and the December 11 game against the Minnesota Vikings.

Suh was named a Pro Bowl alternate for the NFC after the 2011 season. He finished his second professional season with four sacks, a pass deflection, and 26 tackles. Suh was ranked 38th by his fellow players on the NFL Top 100 Players of 2012.

==== 2012 ====
On Thanksgiving, Suh kicked Houston Texans quarterback Matt Schaub in the groin. The incident resulted in a $30,000 fine from the league, nearly double the mandated fine for a second offense of "striking/kicking/kneeing" an opponent. There was speculation the size of the fine was recognition by the league of Suh's history of questionable on-field hits, while others viewed it as a "wishy-washy" and "cop-out" action by the league in issuing a large fine without a suspension. In response, NFL Commissioner Roger Goodell said that "intent is something that's very difficult for us to ever try to make a judgment on". Suh denied the kick was intentional, stating his foot inadvertently hit Schaub as he was being dragged to the ground. Suh finished the 2012 season with eight sacks, two passes defended, and 25 tackles in 16 games (15 starts). He was named to the Pro Bowl and earned first team All-Pro honors. Suh was ranked 40th by his fellow players on the NFL Top 100 Players of 2013.

==== 2013 ====
In the season-opening 34–24 victory over the Minnesota Vikings, Suh low blocked John Sullivan during a DeAndre Levy "pick 6"; the resulting personal foul nullified Levy's touchdown. Two days after the game, Suh was fined $100,000 for the hit—which, not counting lost pay for suspensions, is the largest fine ever issued to a player for on-the-field actions. He appealed the fine, but the ruling was later upheld by the NFL.

During a Week 6 victory over the Cleveland Browns, Suh tackled Browns quarterback Brandon Weeden in a questionable manner. Though not called for a penalty during the game, Suh was fined $31,500 by the NFL, but the fine was later rescinded.

On Thanksgiving against the Green Bay Packers, Suh sacked Matt Flynn in the end zone, forcing a safety for the first time of his career. The next day, Suh was fined $7,875 for performing a throat slash gesture during a game against the Tampa Bay Buccaneers. Suh finished the 2013 season with 5.5 sacks, 49 total tackles, 20 quarterback hits, six passes defensed, and a forced fumble. He was named to the Pro Bowl and earned first team All-Pro honors. Suh was ranked 40th by his fellow players on the NFL Top 100 Players of 2014.

==== 2014 ====
Suh appeared in and started all 16 games in the 2014 season. He totaled 20 quarterback hits, three passes defensed, 53 tackles and 8.5 sacks. In the regular-season finale against the Green Bay Packers, Suh stepped on quarterback Aaron Rodgers' calf. Suh received a one-game suspension, seemingly barring him from the Wild Card Round playoff game the following week against the Dallas Cowboys; but on appeal, arbitrator Ted Cottrell reversed the suspension, opting instead for another fine worth $70,000. Suh was named to the Pro Bowl and earned first team All-Pro honors. He played in the Wild Card Round against the Cowboys and sacked Tony Romo twice in the 24–20 loss. Suh was ranked 24th by his fellow players on the NFL Top 100 Players of 2015.

=== Miami Dolphins ===
==== 2015 ====
On March 11, 2015, the Miami Dolphins announced that they had signed Suh to a six-year, $114 million contract with $60 million guaranteed. The contract made him the highest-paid defensive player in NFL history, passing Houston Texans defensive end J. J. Watt.

During the season-opener against the Washington Redskins, as Redskins running back Alfred Morris was still lying on the ground following a tackle, Suh appeared to knock Morris' helmet off with his leg. The next day, the NFL announced that they would not discipline him, as "Suh's action was not deemed a kick". Suh started all 16 games in 2015, finishing the season with 61 tackles, six sacks, and five passes defended. He was ranked 40th on the NFL Top 100 Players of 2016.

==== 2016 ====
In 2016, Suh started all 16 games with 72 tackles, five sacks, and six passes defended. He was named to his fifth Pro Bowl. Suh was ranked 55th by his peers on the NFL Top 100 Players of 2017.

==== 2017 ====
During Thursday Night Football against the Baltimore Ravens in Week 8, Suh committed two unnecessary roughness penalties, including one moment where he attempted to choke Ryan Mallett and shove him out of reach. Suh claimed that his choke on Mallett was in self-defense, thinking that Mallett tried to attack him first. The Dolphins lost 40–0. Suh finished the season with 48 combined tackles, 4.5 sacks, and two forced fumbles. He was ranked 61st by his peers on the NFL Top 100 Players of 2018.

On March 14, 2018, Suh was released, to free up a large amount of salary cap, after playing three seasons with the Dolphins.

=== Los Angeles Rams ===
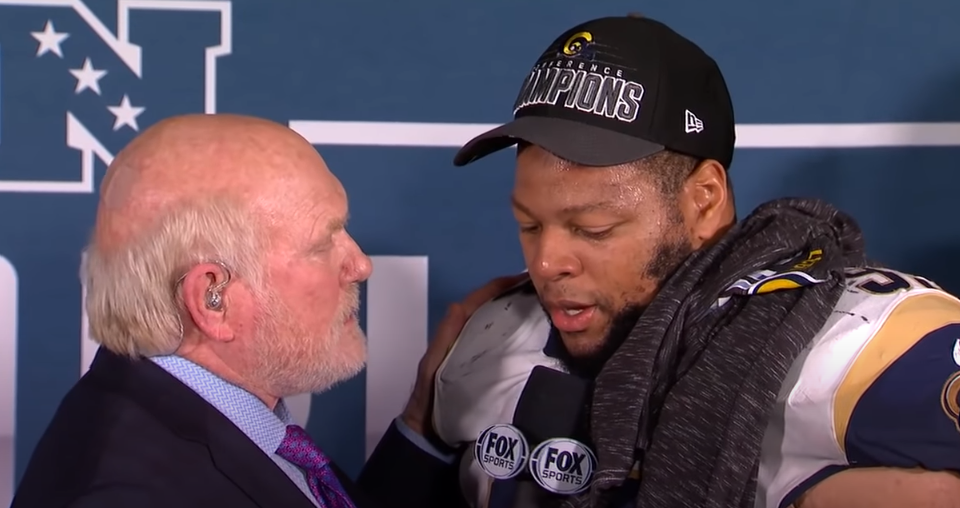
Suh being interviewed by Terry Bradshaw after winning the NFC Championship

On March 26, 2018, Suh signed a one-year, $14 million contract with the Los Angeles Rams.

On December 2, Suh was fined $20,054 for a horse-collar tackle penalty while facing his former team, the Lions. He finished the season with 59 tackles and 4.5 sacks. The Rams finished the season with a 13–3 record and earned the #2-seed in the NFC. In the Divisional Round against the Dallas Cowboys, Suh recorded four tackles. During the NFC Championship Game against the New Orleans Saints, he had four tackles and 1.5 sacks as the Rams posted a controversial 26–23 overtime road victory as Suh reached the Super Bowl for the first time in his career. In Super Bowl LIII, Suh recorded two tackles in the 13–3 loss to the New England Patriots.

The Rams did not offer Suh a new contract and signaled early in the free agent period of the new NFL year that they had decided to move on from him.

=== Tampa Bay Buccaneers ===
==== 2019 ====
Suh signed a one-year contract with the Tampa Bay Buccaneers on May 23, 2019. During a Week 4 55–40 road victory over the Los Angeles Rams, Suh recovered a fumble caused by a strip sack by teammate Shaquil Barrett on Jared Goff and returned it 37 yards for a touchdown, the second of his career. During a Week 12 35–22 road victory over the Atlanta Falcons, Suh scored the third fumble return touchdown of his career off a strip sack caused by teammate Jason Pierre-Paul on Matt Ryan. In the process, Suh tied a Buccaneers franchise record for the most fumbles returned for touchdowns in a season held by Ronde Barber with his second. In the next game the Jacksonville Jaguars, Suh had two tackles and recovered a forced fumble by teammate Carl Nassib.

Suh finished the 2019 season with 41 tackles, 2.5 sacks, four passes defended, four fumble recoveries, and two defensive touchdowns. He was named to the Pro Football Hall of Fame All-2010s Team.

==== 2020 ====
On March 26, 2020, Suh re-signed with the Buccaneers on a one-year contract.

In Week 2 against the Carolina Panthers, Suh recorded his first two sacks of the season on Teddy Bridgewater during the 31–17 victory. Suh finished the 2020 season with 43 tackles, six sacks, two passes defended, and a forced fumble.

In February 2021, Suh won his first Super Bowl as Tampa Bay defeated the Kansas City Chiefs by a score of 31–9 in Super Bowl LV. During the game, Suh recorded 1.5 sacks on Patrick Mahomes.

==== 2021 ====
On April 5, 2021, Suh re-signed to a one-year, $9 million contract with the Buccaneers after testing free agency. He appeared in and started all 17 games for the Buccaneers and recorded 27 total tackles, 13 quarterback hits, eight tackle for losses, and six sacks.

=== Philadelphia Eagles ===
On November 17, 2022, Suh signed a one-year contract with the Philadelphia Eagles. In eight games with the Eagles, he finished with one sack, ten total tackles, and two quarterback hits in the 2022 regular season. Suh reached Super Bowl LVII, where the Eagles lost 38–35 to the Kansas City Chiefs.

=== Retirement ===
After two seasons out of football, Suh officially announced his retirement from the NFL via his social media profiles on X and Instagram on July 12, 2025.

=== Style of play ===
Early in his career, Suh was criticized in the media by other players and for his aggressive style of play. Before his second pro season was finished, Suh had been flagged for nine personal fouls, the most of any player in the league during that time. In the first four seasons of his career, Suh was fined $216,875 by the league for four separate on-field violations. In a poll of fellow players conducted by the Sporting News, Suh was named "the dirtiest player" in the NFL. He was named the NFL's "Least-Liked Player" in a Forbes-publicized Nielsen report in October 2012. However, while some opposing teams saw as a menacing defensive player, the teams Suh played on found his style quite effective. While Suh had drawn criticism for penalties earlier in his career, he was flagged only five times during the entire 2019 season.

== Career statistics ==
=== NFL ===
==== Regular season ====
Legend
	Won the Super Bowl
**Bold**	Career high

Year	Team	Games		Tackles					Fumbles				Interceptions					
Year	Team	GP	GS	Cmb	Solo	Ast	Sck	Sfty	FF	FR	Yds	TD	PD	Int	Yds	Avg	Lng	TD
2010	DET	16	16	66	**49**	17	**10.0**	—	1	1	17	1	3	**1**	**20**	**20.0**	**20**	0
2011	DET	14	14	36	26	10	4.0	—	—	—	—	—	1	—	—	—	—	—
2012	DET	16	16	34	24	10	8.0	—	—	—	—	—	2	—	—	—	—	—
2013	DET	16	16	49	36	13	5.5	**1**	1	—	—	—	**6**	—	—	—	—	—
2014	DET	16	16	53	44	9	8.5	—	—	—	—	—	3	—	—	—	—	—
2015	MIA	16	16	61	38	23	6.0	—	—	—	—	—	5	—	—	—	—	—
2016	MIA	16	16	**72**	40	**32**	5.0	—	—	1	—	—	**6**	—	—	—	—	—
2017	MIA	16	16	48	29	19	4.5	—	**2**	—	—	—	2	—	—	—	—	—
2018	LAR	16	16	59	36	23	4.5	—	—	2	—	—	4	—	—	—	—	—
2019	TB	16	16	41	22	19	2.5	—	—	**4**	**43**	**2**	4	—	—	—	—	—
2020	TB	16	16	44	27	17	6.0	—	1	—	—	—	2	—	—	—	—	—
2021	TB	17	17	27	15	12	6.0	—	—	1	—	—	—	—	—	—	—	—
2022	PHI	8	0	10	4	6	1.0	—	—	—	—	—	—	—	—	—	—	—
Career		199	191	600	392	208	71.5	1	5	9	60	3	38	1	20	20.0	20	0

==== Postseason ====
Year	Team	Games		Tackles					Fumbles				Interceptions					
Year	Team	GP	GS	Cmb	Solo	Ast	Sck	Sfty	FF	FR	Yds	TD	PD	Int	Yds	Avg	Lng	TD
2011	DET	1	1	3	0	3	0.5	—	—	—	—	—	—	—	—	—	—	—
2014	DET	1	1	3	3	0	**2.0**	—	—	—	—	—	—	—	—	—	—	—
2016	MIA	1	1	4	4	0	1.0	—	—	—	—	—	—	—	—	—	—	—
2018	LAR	3	3	**10**	**6**	4	1.5	—	—	—	—	—	—	—	—	—	—	—
2020	TB	4	4	**10**	4	**6**	1.5	—	—	—	—	—	—	—	—	—	—	—
2021	TB	2	2	8	4	4	0.5	—	**1**	—	—	—	—	—	—	—	—	—
2022	PHI	3	0	2	1	1	0.0	—	—	—	—	—	—	—	—	—	—	—
Career		15	12	40	22	18	7.0	—	1	—	—	—	—	—	—	—	—	—

=== College ===
Legend
	Led the NCAA
**Bold**	Career high

Season	Team	Games		Tackles					Interceptions			Fumbles			
Season	Team	GP	GS	Cmb	Solo	Ast	TfL	Sck	PD	Int	TD	FF	FR	QBH	Blk
2005	Nebraska	2	0	1	0	1	0	0.0	0	0	0	0	0	0	0
2006	Nebraska	14	0	19	12	7	7	3.5	0	1	0	**1**	0	2	0
2007	Nebraska	12	11	34	22	12	6	1.0	2	0	0	0	0	4	1
2008	Nebraska	13	13	76	39	**37**	16	7.5	3	**2**	**2**	**1**	0	7	2
2009	Nebraska	14	14	**85**	**52**	33	**20.5**	**12.0**	**10**	1	0	**1**	0	**28**	**3**
Career		55	38	215	125	90	49.5	24.0	15	4	2	3	0	41	6

== Personal life ==
In 2015, Forbes estimated Suh's annual income at $38.5 million.

Suh's mother, Bernadette (née Lennon) Suh, an elementary school teacher, was born in Spanish Town, Jamaica, and is a graduate of Southern Oregon University. His father, Michael Suh, a mechanical engineer, is from Cameroon and played semi-professional soccer in Germany, while also playing for the Cameroonian national team and working as a machinist. They met and married in Portland, Oregon, in 1982, after Michael Suh was admitted to a Portland trade school. Although his father is 5 ft 8 in (1.73 m), Suh's great-grandfather, also named Ndamukong Suh, stood 7 ft 3 in (2.21 m). In the Ngemba language of Cameroon, Ndamukong means "House of Spears".

Suh has a Construction Management degree from the University of Nebraska–Lincoln and has aspirations to be a general contractor after his professional career. His father, Michael Suh, owns his own heating and cooling company in Portland. For his first two years in college before he knew about his professional prospects, Suh had wanted to "work with [his] dad and build his company up to be as big as possible" after graduation.

Suh has four sisters, he is the second oldest of the five children. His older sister and manager, Odette Lennon Ngum Suh, played collegiate soccer at Mississippi State University and was previously a midfielder on the Cameroon women's national football team. His cousin, Kameron Chatman, played for the Michigan Wolverines men's basketball team.

Suh is a fan of Arsenal F.C.

In 2012, Suh participated in Fox's dating game show The Choice. Suh was nominated on Splash on March 10, 2013. He was eliminated on the 2nd week of the show.

During the 2013 Stanley Cup Playoffs, Suh rode the Zamboni at Joe Louis Arena wearing a Detroit Red Wings jersey during the Red Wings' playoff series against the Chicago Blackhawks.

Since the 2023 NFL season, Suh has worked as a pundit for NFL coverage by Sky Sports in the United Kingdom.

=== Donation ===
On April 17, 2010 at the annual Husker Spring Game, Suh announced a $2.6 million donation to the University of Nebraska–Lincoln. Two million dollars of his gift will go to Nebraska Athletics for its Strength and Conditioning Program and the remaining $600,000 will create an endowed scholarship for the UNL College of Engineering, from which he graduated in 2009 with a degree in construction management. His gift is the largest single charitable contribution by any former player and occurred before Suh was taken with the second overall pick in the 2010 NFL Draft. Suh, a former Grant High School football star, donated $250,000 toward the effort to bring a turf field to Grant High School in 2013.

=== Endorsements ===
Before Suh was selected by an NFL team, he signed an endorsement deal with Nike. Suh also signed endorsement deals with Subway, Dick's Sporting Goods, Omaha Steaks, and Chrysler.
