= Matt Fodge =

American football player (born 1986)

No. 18
- Position: Punter

Personal information
- Born: September 16, 1986 (age 40); Garland, Texas, U.S.
- Listed height: 6 ft 0 in (1.83 m)
- Listed weight: 193 lb (88 kg)

Career information
- High school: Garland
- College: Oklahoma State (2005–2008)

Awards and highlights
- Ray Guy Award (2008); 3× Second-team All-Big 12 (2006–2008)

Matt Fodge (born September 16, 1986) is an American former football punter who played college football for the Oklahoma State Cowboys, where he won the Ray Guy Award in 2008. He was signed by the Dallas Cowboys as an undrafted free agent in 2009, but never played in any NFL game.

After his college career he has served as vice president of Gleco Plating in Rowlett, Texas under his father, president Jeff Fodge.

== College career ==
Fodge played college football at Oklahoma State. He won the Ray Guy Award during the 2008 college football season.

== Professional career ==
Fodge was signed by the Dallas Cowboys on June 15, 2009. He was released before the start of training camp.
