= Sean Weatherspoon =

American football player (born 1987)

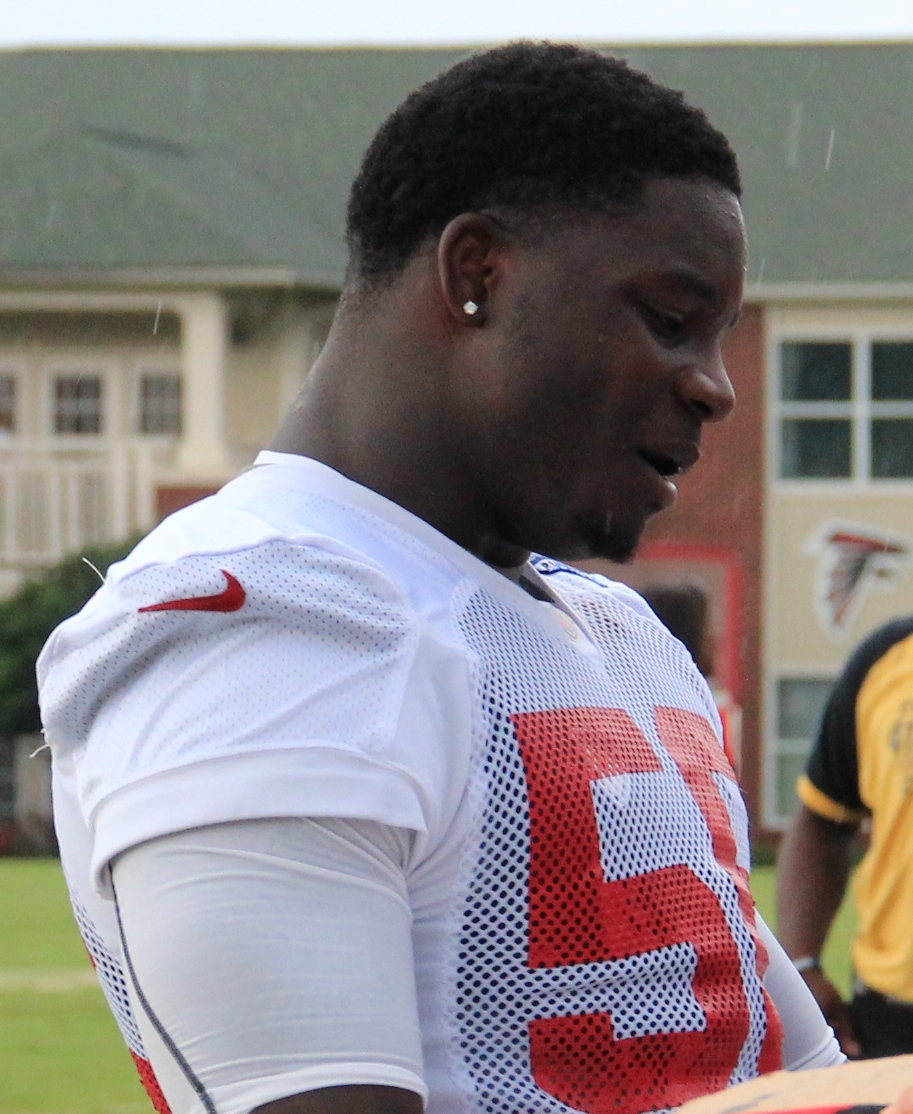
- Weatherspoon with the Atlanta Falcons in 2013

No. 56, 55
- Position: Linebacker

Personal information
- Born: December 29, 1987 (age 38); Jasper, Texas, U.S.
- Listed height: 6 ft 2 in (1.88 m)
- Listed weight: 244 lb (111 kg)

Career information
- High school: Jasper (TX)
- College: Missouri (2006–2009)
- NFL draft: 2010: 1st round, 19th overall pick

Career history
- Atlanta Falcons (2010–2014); Arizona Cardinals (2015); Atlanta Falcons (2016–2017)

Awards and highlights
- 2× Second-team All-American (2008, 2009); 3× First-team All-Big 12 (2007, 2008, 2009)

Career NFL statistics
- Total tackles: 329
- Sacks: 8.0
- Forced fumbles: 1
- Pass deflections: 15
- Interceptions: 2
- Defensive touchdowns: 1
- Stats at Pro Football Reference

Franklin De'Sean Weatherspoon (born December 29, 1987) is an American former professional football player who was a linebacker in the National Football League (NFL). He played college football for the Missouri Tigers and was selected by the Atlanta Falcons with the 19th overall pick in the 2010 NFL draft. He also played for the Arizona Cardinals.

== Early life ==
Weatherspoon attended Jasper High School in Jasper, Texas, where he was a versatile athlete who was an accomplished three-sport star in Texas, including as a linebacker in football. He was the 2006 recipient of the defensive Willie Ray Smith Award. He was named the Texas District 22-3A player of the year as a senior; after making 98 tackles in 2005 for the Jasper Bulldogs. He had 8 tackles for loss in 2005, and added 4 quarterback sacks along with 2 interceptions from his linebacker position as well. His high school football career also included a second-team All-State pick. He also played receiver on offense, and had 27 catches for 428 yards and 7 touchdowns. He was a first-team All-District selection as a junior in 2004 at linebacker, after registering 105 tackles, 6 tackles for loss, 2 QB sacks and 3 interceptions. He was named the 22-3A defensive newcomer of the year as a sophomore in 2003; when he amassed 101 stops, 3 tackles for loss, 1 QB sack and 2 interceptions. He was an All-District performer as a guard in basketball.

In track & field, Weatherspoon was an All-State high jumper. At the 2005 District 22-3A Championships, he won the high jump event with a leap of 1.89 meters (6-2), and ran the fourth leg on the Bulldogs 4 × 200 relay, helping them earn a first-place finish with a school-record time of 1:30.62 minutes. He posted personal-best leaps of 1.97 meters (6 ft 5 in) in the high jump and 6.40 meters (20-11) in the long jump. He also competed as a sprinter, running the 200-meter dash in 22.9 seconds, and was also timed at 4.5 seconds in the 40-yard dash.

Considered only a two-star recruit by Rivals.com, Weatherspoon was not ranked among the best linebacker prospects in the nation. He chose Missouri over Iowa State, Houston, Tulane, and TCU, among others.

== College career ==
One of only four true freshmen to play for the Tigers in 2006, Weatherspoon saw action in all 13 games, primarily on various special teams units, and was named Mizzou's special teams player of the year, as he led the team with 9 tackles on kickoff coverage. Weatherspoon was listed as the backup on the depth chart at middle linebacker to senior co-captain Dedrick Harrington, and had 17 tackles in all for the season.

As a sophomore, Weatherspoon became a starter at weakside linebacker and blossomed into a leader on the field, under the tutoring of coach Dave Steckel. He led the team with 130 tackles, and also broke up 8 passes on the year (second most on the team). Weatherspoon received All-Big 12 First-team honors by the Associated Press, San Antonio Express-News, and Rivals.com in 2007.

In 2008, Weatherspoon finished the season with 155 tackles, which were the 2nd-most in Missouri single-season history, trailing only to Travis McDonald (164 in 1994). He also had 18.5 tackles for loss, 3 interceptions (2 of which he returned for touchdowns), and also broke up 7 passes. In the 2008 Alamo Bowl, Weatherspoon was named the game's defensive MVP after registering 17 tackles. He announced after the game that he had filed for the 2009 NFL draft, but just to see where he would rank, and that he would return for his senior season.

== Professional career ==
Pre-draft measurables
Height	Weight	Arm length	Hand span	40-yard dash	10-yard split	20-yard split	20-yard shuttle	Three-cone drill	Vertical jump	Broad jump	Bench press
6 ft 1 1/4 in (1.86 m)	239 lb (108 kg)	31 1/4 in (0.79 m)	10 1/4 in (0.26 m)	4.52 s	1.58 s	2.62 s	4.38 s	6.99 s	40.0 in (1.02 m)	10 ft 3 in (3.12 m)	35 reps
All values from NFL Combine/Pro Day

=== Atlanta Falcons (first stint) ===
Weatherspoon was drafted in the first round by the Atlanta Falcons 19th overall in the 2010 NFL Draft. In his rookie season, he recorded 42 tackles and one sack. He played in only 11 games while starting 5.

In 2011, Weatherspoon then became the Falcons' starting outside linebacker. Without missing a start, he finished the season with 115 tackles, four sacks, and one fumble recovery.

Weatherspoon was named the Falcons' defensive captain at the beginning of the 2012 season. He ended his 2012 campaign with 95 tackles, three sacks and his first career interception. He played in and started 13 games.

In 2013, Weatherspoon missed 10 regular season games due to injury. He finished the season with 38 tackles, one interception and his first career touchdown.

On June 10, 2014, the Falcons announced that Weatherspoon would miss the entire 2014 season with a ruptured Achilles tendon.

=== Arizona Cardinals ===
On March 11, 2015, Weatherspoon signed a one-year deal with the Arizona Cardinals.

=== Atlanta Falcons (second stint) ===
On March 10, 2016, Weatherspoon agreed to a one-year contract to return to the Falcons. On October 4, he was placed on injured reserve after suffering a torn Achilles in a Week 4 win over the Carolina Panthers, ending his season.

On October 24, 2017, Weatherspoon re-signed with the Falcons.

== NFL career statistics ==
Year	Team	GP	Tackles				Fumbles			Interceptions					
Year	Team	GP	Cmb	Solo	Ast	Sck	FF	FR	Yds	Int	Yds	Avg	Lng	TD	PD
2010	ATL	11	42	34	8	1.0	0	0	0	0	0	0.0	0	0	1
2011	ATL	16	115	82	33	4.0	0	1	0	0	0	0.0	0	0	8
2012	ATL	13	95	70	25	3.0	1	1	0	1	6	6.0	6	0	4
2013	ATL	7	38	26	12	0.0	0	0	0	1	71	71.0	71	1	2
2014	ATL	0	Did not play due to injury												
2015	ARI	14	11	9	2	0.0	0	0	0	0	0	0.0	0	0	0
2016	ATL	4	27	21	6	0.0	0	0	0	0	0	0.0	0	0	0
2017	ATL	2	1	1	0	0.0	0	0	0	0	0	0.0	0	0	0
Career		67	329	243	86	8.0	1	2	0	2	77	38.5	71	1	15

== Coaching career ==
In February 2025, Pace Academy announced Weatherspoon as the school's new head football coach.

== Personal life ==
Sean was born to Develous Weatherspoon and Elwanda Martin Weatherspoon in Greenville, South Carolina in 1987. He has two children, Ava and Franklin Jr., with college girlfriend Christine Weston, whom he married June 10, 2017.

== See also ==
- List of NCAA major college football yearly tackles leaders
