= Kicking specialist =

American football position

A kicking specialist or kick specialist, sometimes referred to as a kicker, especially when referring to a placekicker, is a player on gridiron football special teams who performs punts, kickoffs, field goals and/or point after touchdowns. The special teams counterpart of a kicking specialist is a return specialist.

Kicking specialists were exceptionally rare until the 1940s; for most of the history of American football, teams relied upon players who played another position to kick and punt. The first kicking specialist in the National Football League was most likely Mose Kelsch, a former sandlot football kicker who was on the inaugural roster of what became the Pittsburgh Steelers in 1933 and 1934. Even after the one-platoon system was phased out in the 1940s, kicking specialists remained uncommon. The introduction of the soccer style of placekicking in the late 1960s coincided with the rapid rise of kicking specialists. Danny White of the Dallas Cowboys was the last non-specialist kicker in the NFL, serving as a punter in addition to his quarterback duties until 1985.

== See also ==
- Punter
- Placekicker
- Kickoff specialist
