= Jeron Mastrud =

American football player (born 1987)

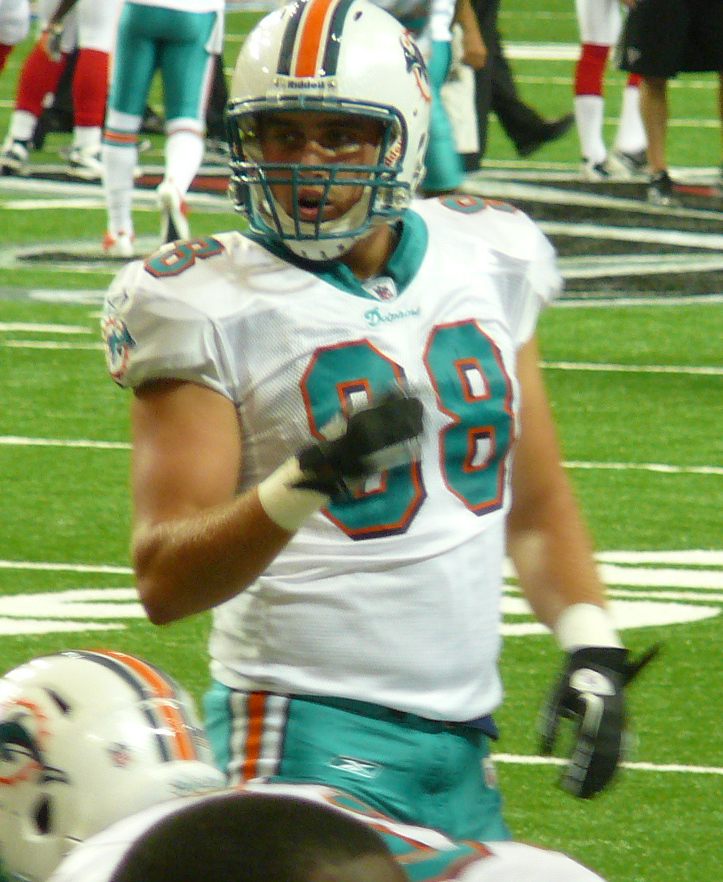
- Mastrud with the Dolphins in 2011

No. 85, 88
- Position: Tight end

Personal information
- Born: December 17, 1987 (age 38); Beaverton, Oregon, U.S.
- Listed height: 6 ft 5 in (1.96 m)
- Listed weight: 247 lb (112 kg)

Career information
- High school: Southridge (Beaverton)
- College: Kansas State (2006–2009)
- NFL draft: 2010: undrafted

Career history
- Tampa Bay Buccaneers (2010)*; New England Patriots (2010)*; Miami Dolphins (2010–2012); Oakland Raiders (2013); Chicago Bears (2014)*
- * Offseason or practice squad member only

Awards and highlights
- First-team All-Big 12 (2009)

Career NFL statistics
- Receptions: 7
- Receiving yards: 96
- Stats at Pro Football Reference

Jeron Scott Mastrud (born December 17, 1987) is an American former professional football player who was a tight end in the National Football League (NFL). He was signed by the Tampa Bay Buccaneers as an undrafted free agent in 2010. He played college football for the Kansas State Wildcats.

He was also a member of the New England Patriots, Miami Dolphins, Oakland Raiders and Chicago Bears.

== Early life ==
Mastrud is the son of a Scholls Heights Elementary School teacher and a Southridge High School physical education teacher. Mastrud attended Southridge High School in Beaverton, Oregon, where he played football as a tight end, quarterback, and defensive end. As a senior, he completed 49 of 82 pass attempts for 731 yards and 10 touchdowns. He earned first-team All-Portland Metro League honors as a defensive end, and as a tight end was second-team all-league. He was also named to the third-team all-state as a defensive end.

== College career ==
After graduating from high school, Mastrud attended Kansas State University, where he started 48 of a possible 49 games, including the final 26 of his career. His 106 career receptions rank first in school history among tight ends, and tenth among all positions, while his 1,219 career receiving yards are 18th in school history. Mastrud earned Academic All-Big 12 Conference honors the three years he was eligible, as well as being named to Academic All-District and All-American teams as a junior and senior.

== Professional career ==
=== Tampa Bay Buccaneers ===
After going undrafted in the 2010 NFL draft, Mastrud signed with the Tampa Bay Buccaneers on April 27, 2010. He played in four preseason games with the Buccaneers before being waived on September 4, 2010, during final cuts.

=== New England Patriots ===
Mastrud was signed to the practice squad of the New England Patriots on April 26, 2010, but was released the next day.

=== Miami Dolphins ===
The Miami Dolphins signed Mastrud to their practice squad on September 8, 2010. He was promoted to the team's 53-man roster on September 21, 2010, making his NFL debut as a reserve in the Dolphins' Week 3 game against the New York Jets on September 26.

=== Oakland Raiders ===
Mastrud was signed by Oakland Raiders on May 13, 2013. At the end of the 2013 season Mastrud became a free agent. He signed with the Bears on June 23, 2014.

=== Chicago Bears ===
Mastrud signed with the Bears on June 23, 2014. The Bears released Mastrud on August 29, 2014.
