= Joe Pawelek =

American football player (born 1986)

No. 55
- Position: Linebacker

Personal information
- Born: December 8, 1986 (age 39); Corpus Christi, Texas, U.S.
- Listed height: 6 ft 2 in (1.88 m)
- Listed weight: 237 lb (108 kg)

Career information
- High school: Smithson Valley (Spring Branch, Texas)
- College: Baylor
- NFL draft: 2010: undrafted

Career history
- Seattle Seahawks (2010); Jacksonville Jaguars (2011)*
- * Offseason or practice squad member only

Awards and highlights
- 2× First-team All-Big 12 (2008, 2009); Second-team All-Big 12 (2006)
- Stats at Pro Football Reference

Joseph Charles Pawelek (born December 8, 1986) is an American former professional football player who was a linebacker for the Seattle Seahawks of the National Football League (NFL). He played college football for the Baylor Bears.

== Early life ==
He graduated from Smithson Valley High school, coached under Larry Hill.

== Professional career ==
He signed as free agent with the Seattle Seahawks after going undrafted in the 2010 NFL draft. He was cut from the Seahawks on September 4, 2010, but was then immediately picked up the following day to be a part of the 2010 Seahawks practice squad because of a solid preseason performance. He was then brought up from the practice squad and was 2nd string ILB below former Seahawks MLB Lofa Tatupu, but did play UpBack on special teams occasionally. The Seahawks released Pawelek on July 29, 2011.

On October 12, 2011, he was signed to the Jacksonville Jaguars' practice squad. He was released from the practice squad two weeks later on October 26.

== Awards and honors ==
- 2006 FWAA, Sporting News and College Football News Freshman First-team All-American
- 2006 Rivals.com Freshman Second-team All-American
- 2006, 2007, 2008 Academic All-Big 12 first-team
- 2007 All-Big 12 honorable mention
- 2008 All-Big 12 first-team
- 2008 ESPN The Magazine Second-team All-American
