= Chris Hall (offensive lineman) =

American football player (born 1987)

No. 71 – Texas Longhorns
- Position: Center
- Class: Alumnus

Personal information
- Born: January 1, 1987 (age 39); Irving, Texas, U.S.
- Listed height: 6 ft 4 in (1.93 m)
- Listed weight: 295 lb (134 kg)

Career information
- High school: Irving High School, Irving, Texas
- College: University of Texas (2005–2009)

Awards and highlights
- First-team All-American (2009); 2007 Second Team All-Big 12; 3× Boss Hog Award Winner

Christopher Luke Hall (born January 1, 1987) is an American college football offensive lineman. He attended the University of Texas at Austin from 2005 to 2009. Hall was regarded as one of the best center prospects of his class, but chose to enroll in Bible school instead of pursuing an NFL career.

== Early life ==
Hall attended Irving High School in Irving, Texas, where he was three-year letterman and two-time all-district pick at offensive tackle. He earned 5A all-area and first-team all-district 6-5A honors as a senior in 2004, after recording 115 pancake blocks in 11 games. As a junior, he was named first-team all-district and all-city as he registered 125 pancake blocks in 14 games that year.

Considered a three-star recruit by Rivals.com, Hall was listed as the No. 32 offensive tackle prospect in the nation. Hall drew scholarship offers from a number of Big 12 schools, and chose Texas over Arkansas and Texas Tech.

== College career ==
After redshirting his initial year at Texas, Hall appeared in seven games for the Longhorns in 2006. As a sophomore, he appeared in all 13 games with 12 starts, while starting at least one game at all five positions along the offensive line.

By his junior year, he had established himself as the Longhorns starting center. In 2008, Hall started 11 games—missing only the Kansas and Texas A&M games with a knee injury—and has been part of the Texas offensive line that helped Colt McCoy reach 4,008 passing yards setting the school record, while its 551 points and 6,185 total yards rank second on schools single-season list.

For the 2009 season, Hall was named to the watch list for the Rimington Trophy.

== Post-college career ==
Hall was considered one of the best interior offensive linemen available for the 2010 NFL draft.
