= Adam Ulatoski =

American football player (born 1985)

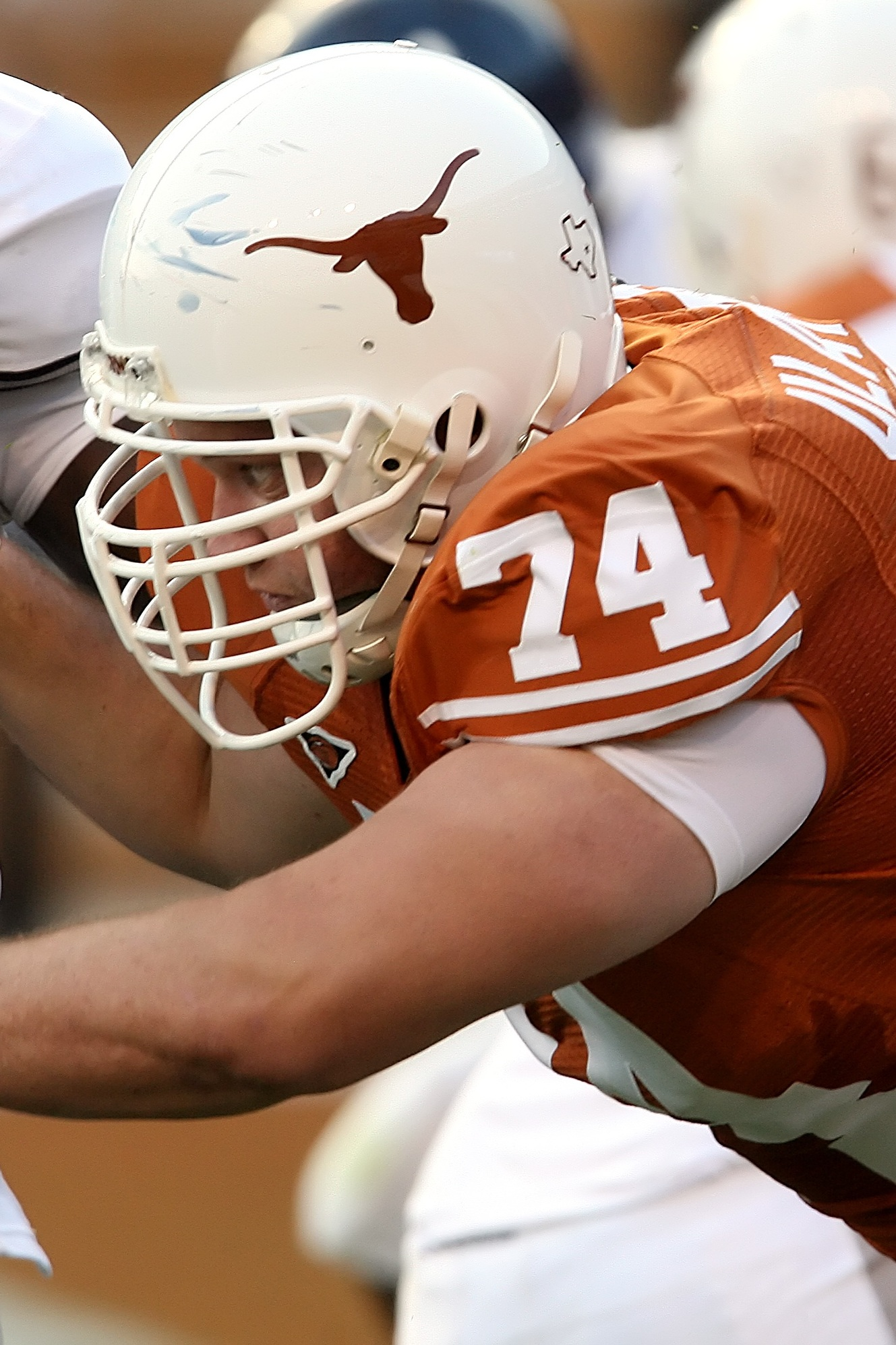
- Ulatoski with Texas Longhorns in 2008

No. 77
- Position: Offensive tackle

Personal information
- Born: December 17, 1985 (age 40); Naperville, Illinois, U.S.
- Listed height: 6 ft 5 in (1.96 m)
- Listed weight: 300 lb (136 kg)

Career information
- College: Texas
- NFL draft: 2010: undrafted

Career history
- Houston Texans (2010)*
- * Offseason or practice squad member only

Awards and highlights
- Second-team All-American (2009); Freshman All-American (2006); All-Big 12 (2008, 2009)

Adam Ulatoski (born December 17, 1985) is an American former college football player who was an offensive tackle for the Texas Longhorns. He was considered one of the best offensive tackles of his class.

== Early life ==
Ulatoski attended Carroll High School in Southlake, Texas, where he was coached by former Texas Longhorn quarterback Todd Dodge, and protected quarterback Chase Daniel as left tackle. He helped the Dragons to post a 41–6 record and advance to two state title games during that stretch. Ulatoski earned Parade All-American honors as a senior in 2003.

Considered a three-star recruit by Rivals.com, Ulatoski was listed 24th among offensive tackle prospects in the nation.

== College career ==
In 2004, Ulatoski has taken what is considered a "grayshirt" season, which means he did not enroll at the University of Texas at Austin to not burn a redshirt season. He then redshirted the 2005 season.

In 2006, Ulatoski played in 12 games at right tackle, starting the final seven. He was named a first-team Freshman All-American by The Sporting News. As a sophomore, Ulatoski started nine games at right tackle before making his first career start at left tackle against Arizona State in the 2007 Holiday Bowl.

In his junior year, Ulatoski started all 13 games at left tackle. He received first-team All-Big 12 honors by the Austin American-Statesman, the league's coaches and the Kansas City Star.

In 2009, Ulatoski was listed at No. 11 on Rivals.com′s preseason offensive tackle power ranking. He was also named to the 2009 Outland Trophy watch list.

== Professional career ==
=== 2010 NFL draft ===
Ulatoski had initially been considered one of the best offensive tackles available in the 2010 NFL draft. Projecting as a right tackle in the NFL, Ulatoski draws comparisons to Titans' tackle David Stewart. Ulatoski went undrafted and signed a free agent deal with the Houston Texans. He was waived by the Texans on June 16, 2010.
