= 2011 Denver Broncos season =

American football team season

- Owner: Pat Bowlen
- General manager: Brian Xanders
- Head coach: John Fox
- Offensive coordinator: Mike McCoy
- Defensive coordinator: Dennis Allen
- Home stadium: Sports Authority Field at Mile High

Results
- Record: 8–8
- Division place: 1st AFC West
- Playoffs: Won Wild Card Playoffs (vs. Steelers) 29–23 (OT); Lost Divisional Playoffs (at Patriots) 10–45
- All-Pros: LB Von Miller (2nd team)
- Pro Bowlers: CB Champ Bailey; DE Elvis Dumervil; RB Willis McGahee; LB Von Miller; FS Brian Dawkins; OT Ryan Clady

The 2011 season was the Denver Broncos' 42nd in the National Football League (NFL) and their 52nd overall. It also marked their first season under head coach John Fox, as well as the first with John Elway as the team's Executive Vice President of Football Operations.

On July 25, the NFLPA and NFL owners agreed on a new collective bargaining agreement, which was ratified on August 4. The Broncos training camp began on July 28 at the team headquarters in Dove Valley, Colorado, and the preseason and regular season started on time.

This season would be the final time that the Broncos would lose in Week 1 and start 0–1 until eight years later in 2019, both times being a loss to their division rival Oakland Raiders.

This was the first of five consecutive AFC West titles for the Broncos. The first five weeks of the season were dominated by a quarterback controversy involving Kyle Orton and Tim Tebow, with fans voicing their displeasure with the play of Orton, which resulted in a 1–4 start, and the public outcry for Tebow to be moved to starter. On October 11, Tebow was named the starting quarterback beginning with the team's Week 7 game at the Miami Dolphins on October 23. Tebow compiled an 8–5 record (including the playoffs, with a six-game win streak from Weeks 9–14) after replacing Orton, including game-winning drives in the fourth quarter and/or overtime in six of those games, despite constant criticism of his unorthodox mechanics and abilities as a passer. Orton was later waived on November 22. Another notable roster change was the trade that sent wide receiver Brandon Lloyd to the St. Louis Rams in exchange for a conditional 2012 draft selection.

The Broncos doubled their win total from 2010, finishing in a three-way tie with the Oakland Raiders and San Diego Chargers for the AFC West division title, with an 8–8 record. The Broncos, however, won the AFC West based on tiebreakers, thus clinching their first playoff berth and division title since 2005.

The Broncos opened the playoffs with a 29–23 overtime win over the Pittsburgh Steelers in the wild-card round, but were blown out by the New England Patriots in the divisional round by a score of 45–10.

== Coaching and front office changes ==
- January 5: Hall of Fame quarterback John Elway was hired as the team's Executive Vice President of Football Operations. Brian Xanders remained as general manager, but Elway had the final word in all football matters. Joe Ellis, who served as the team's chief operating officer for the past three years, was promoted to team president.
- January 13: The Broncos named former Carolina Panthers' head coach John Fox as the team's new head coach.
- January 17: The following changes were made to the Broncos' coaching staff: Clancy Barone was moved from offensive line coach to tight ends coach, replacing Bob Ligashesky. Dave Magazu was named the new offensive line coach. Tyke Tolbert was named the new wide receivers coach. Magazu and Tolbert both previously served on John Fox's staff with the Panthers. Brian Callahan was moved to the offensive quality control position, while Jay Rodgers was moved to the defensive quality control position. Eric Studesville, who served as the team's interim head coach for the final four games of the 2010 season, retained his position as the running backs coach.
- January 20: Adam Gase, who served as the Broncos' wide receivers coach during the previous two seasons, was named the team's new quarterbacks coach, replacing Ben McDaniels. That same day, Jeff Rodgers, who served on John Fox's staff with the Panthers during the previous two seasons, was named the team's new special teams coach.
- January 24: The Broncos hired former New Orleans Saints' secondary coach Dennis Allen as the team's new defensive coordinator, replacing Don Martindale.
- January 25: Ron Milus was hired as the new secondary coach, replacing Dennis Allen, while Richard Smith was hired as the new linebackers coach. Milus previously served as the Broncos' secondary coach in 2000, while Smith previously served as the Broncos' special teams coach and linebackers coach in the mid-1990s, and both previously served on John Fox's staff with the Panthers during the past two seasons.
- January 27: The coaching staff was finalized, when Keith Burns was brought back as the assistant special teams coach and Sam Garnes was hired as the teams' new assistant secondary coach. Garnes served on John Fox's staff with the Panthers last season.
- July 22: The Broncos hired Jerry Butler as the team's director of player development. Butler previously served in the same capacity with the Cleveland Browns from 2001 to 2010, and was a wide receiver with the Buffalo Bills from 1979 to 1986.

== Pre-lockout roster changes ==
The Broncos made the following roster moves prior to the decertification of the NFLPA on March 11 and subsequent 2011 NFL Lockout:

- On January 7, five days after the end of the 2010 season, the team signed fullback Mike McLaughlin, guards Shawn Murphy and Manny Ramirez and offensive tackle Herb Taylor to future contracts. McLaughlin was waived on July 29, Murphy was waived on August 29 and Taylor was waived on September 6.
- On February 22, unrestricted free agent cornerback Champ Bailey was re-signed.
- On March 2, tight end Daniel Graham was released.
- On March 3, unrestricted free agent defensive tackle Kevin Vickerson was re-signed, while defensive tackles Justin Bannan and Jamal Williams were released.

== Draft ==
Despite the 2011 NFL Lockout, the 2011 NFL draft was held from April 28–30. However, no undrafted free agents were signed until after the lockout ended on July 25.

2011 Denver Broncos Draft
| Round | Selection | Player | Position | College | Notes | Trades |
|---|---|---|---|---|---|---|
| 1 | 2 | Von Miller | LB | Texas A&M | signed July 28 | |
| 2 | 45 | Rahim Moore | S | UCLA | signed July 28 | (Note: The Broncos traded their original second-round selection (No. 36 overall) to the San Francisco 49ers in exchange for the 49ers' second- (No. 45 overall), fourth- (No. 108 overall) and fifth- (No. 141 overall; later traded to the Green Bay Packers) round selections.) (Note: The Broncos acquired this second-round selection as part of an April 2010 trade that sent wide receiver Brandon Marshall to the Miami Dolphins.) |
| 2 | 46 | Orlando Franklin | OT | Miami | signed July 29 | (Note: The Broncos traded their original second-round selection (No. 36 overall) to the San Francisco 49ers in exchange for the 49ers' second- (No. 45 overall), fourth- (No. 108 overall) and fifth- (No. 141 overall; later traded to the Green Bay Packers) round selections.) (Note: The Broncos acquired this second-round selection as part of an April 2010 trade that sent wide receiver Brandon Marshall to the Miami Dolphins.) |
| 3 | 67 | Nate Irving | LB | NC State | signed July 29 | |
| 4 | 108 | Quinton Carter | S | Oklahoma | signed July 29 | (Note: The Broncos traded their original fourth-round selection (No. 99 overall) to the New England Patriots in exchange for the Patriots' sixth-round selection (No. 189 overall) and running back Laurence Maroney in September 2010.) (Note: See draft note 1.) |
| 4 | 129 | Julius Thomas | TE | Portland State | signed July 27 | (Note: The Broncos acquired this fourth-round selection and a seventh-round selection (No. 204 overall) in a trade that sent a fifth-round selection (No. 141 overall; see draft note 1) and a sixth-round selection (No. 186 overall; previously acquired along with TE Dan Gronkowski in a September 2010 trade that sent CB Alphonso Smith and the team's original seventh-round selection – No. 205 overall – to the Detroit Lions) to the Green Bay Packers.) |
| 5 | None | | | | | (Note: See draft notes 1 & 5.) (Note: The Broncos traded their original fifth-round selection (No. 135 overall) to the Tampa Bay Buccaneers in exchange for two 2010 seventh-round selections.) |
| 6 | 189 | Mike Mohamed | LB | California | signed July 27, waived September 22, promoted to the active roster on November 28 | (Note: The Broncos traded their original sixth-round selection (No. 168 overall), a 2012 conditional draft selection and FB Peyton Hillis to the Cleveland Browns in exchange for QB Brady Quinn in March 2010.) (Note: See draft note 3.) |
| 7 | 204 | Virgil Green | TE | Nevada | signed July 27 | (Note: See draft note 5.) |
| 7 | 247 * | Jeremy Beal | DE | Oklahoma | signed July 27, waived September 3 | |

| * | Compensatory selection |

Draft trades

== Post-lockout roster changes ==
=== Free agents ===
The following free agents were left unsigned after the beginning of the 2011 NFL Lockout in March (cornerback Champ Bailey and defensive tackle Kevin Vickerson were re-signed before the lockout):

| Position | Player | Tag | 2011 Team | Notes |
|---|---|---|---|---|
| FB | Kyle Eckel | UFA | None | |
| NT | Ronald Fields | UFA | Carolina Panthers | signed with the Panthers on September 13 |
| OT | Ryan Harris | UFA | Philadelphia Eagles | signed with the Eagles on August 2, re-signed by the Broncos on January 2, 2012 |
| RB | Laurence Maroney | UFA | None | |
| DE | Ryan McBean | ERFA | Denver Broncos | signed tender July 29 |
| PK | Matt Prater | RFA | Denver Broncos | signed tender July 29 |
| DT/NT | Marcus Thomas | UFA | Denver Broncos | re-signed July 31 |
| LB | Wesley Woodyard | RFA | Denver Broncos | signed tender July 29 |

=== Undrafted free agents ===
All undrafted free agents were signed on July 27, two days after the end of the 2011 NFL Lockout.

2011 Denver Broncos undrafted free agents
| Player | Position | College | Notes |
|---|---|---|---|
| CB | Brandon Bing | Rutgers | waived September 3 |
| DT | Ronnell Brown | James Madison | waived September 3 |
| WR | Mark Dell | Michigan State | designated as waived/injured on August 13 |
| LB | Derek Domino | South Dakota State | designated as waived/injured on August 15, released from the waived/injured list on December 13 |
| RB | Mario Fannin | Auburn | designated as waived/injured on August 6 |
| WR | D'Andre Goodwin | Washington | waived September 3, assigned to practice squad September 4, promoted to the active roster on January 10, 2012, on final roster |
| OT | Adam Grant | Arizona | waived September 3, assigned to practice squad on September 4 |
| CB | Chris Harris, Jr. | Kansas | on final roster |
| WR | Jamel Hamler | Fresno State | placed on injured reserve September 3, waived September 12 |
| LB | A. J. Jones | Florida | waived August 16 |
| LB | Deron Mayo | Old Dominion | waived August 29 |
| OT | Curt Porter | Jacksonville State | waived August 29 |
| CB | James Rogers | Michigan | released August 1 |
| FB | Austin Sylvester | Washington | waived September 3, assigned to practice squad September 4, promoted to the active roster on December 27, waived January 13, 2012 |
| QB | Adam Weber | Minnesota | waived September 3, assigned to practice squad on September 4 |
| DT | Colby Whitlock | Texas Tech | released August 2 |
| WR | Marshall Williams | Wake Forest | released August 1 |

=== Signings ===
| Position | Player | 2010 Team | Notes |
|---|---|---|---|
| WR | David Anderson | Houston Texans | signed July 30, waived September 3 |
| LS | David Binn | San Diego Chargers | signed January 13, 2012, on final roster |
| LB | Alvin Bowen | Jacksonville Jaguars | signed August 15, waived September 3 |
| S | Rafael Bush | Atlanta Falcons | signed October 17, on final roster |
| CB | Tony Carter | Practice squad player | promoted to the active roster on December 13, on final roster |
| WR/RS | Quan Cosby | Cincinnati Bengals | signed September 20, waived December 27 |
| TE | Daniel Fells | St. Louis Rams | signed August 1, on final roster |
| RB | C. J. Gable | New Orleans Saints | signed August 6, waived August 29 |
| DE | Derrick Harvey | Jacksonville Jaguars | signed August 1, on final roster |
| OT | Tony Hills | Pittsburgh Steelers | signed September 6, on final roster |
| LB | Brian Iwuh | Chicago Bears | signed January 3, 2012, on final roster |
| RB | Jeremiah Johnson | Practice squad player | promoted to the active roster on September 16, waived September 20, promoted to the active roster on November 14, on final roster |
| FB | Quinn Johnson | Tennessee Titans | signed October 10, waived December 17 |
| S | Kyle McCarthy | Practice squad player | promoted to the active roster on November 28, waived December 13, promoted to the active roster on December 17, waived January 3, 2012 |
| RB | Willis McGahee | Baltimore Ravens | signed July 31, on final roster |
| WR | Greg Orton | Spokane Shock (AFL) | signed August 13, waived September 3 |
| DT | DeMario Pressley | Houston Texans | signed August 17, waived September 3 |
| TE | Dante Rosario | Carolina Panthers | signed August 1, released September 3, re-signed September 22, on final roster |
| DT | Ty Warren | New England Patriots | signed August 2, placed on injured reserve September 17 |
| CB | Jonathan Wilhite | New England Patriots | signed September 4, on final roster |

| Indicates that the player was a free agent at the end of his respective team's 2010 season. |

=== Departures ===
| Position | Player | Notes |
|---|---|---|
| RB | Correll Buckhalter | released July 29 |
| G | Stanley Daniels | waived September 3 |
| TE | Daniel Coats | released July 29 |
| CB | Perrish Cox | waived September 3 |
| WR | Britt Davis | waived September 3 |
| LB | Dominic Douglas | waived July 31 |
| TE | Dan Gronkowski | waived September 3 |
| PK | Steven Hauschka | waived September 3 |
| S | Renaldo Hill | released July 30 |
| CB | Chevis Jackson | waived August 4 |
| CB | Nate Jones | released August 29 |
| LB | Braxton Kelley | waived August 29 |
| DT | Louis Leonard | released August 15 |
| S | Darcel McBath | released September 4 |
| G | Eric Olsen | waived September 3 |
| QB | Kyle Orton | waived November 22 |
| S | Nick Polk | released August 1 |
| TE | Richard Quinn | designated as waived/injured on August 22, released from injured reserve on August 26 |
| LB | Lee Robinson | waived September 3 |
| DE | David Veikune | waived August 29 |
| RB | LenDale White | released August 16 |

=== Trades ===
- July 27: Wide receiver Jabar Gaffney was traded to the Washington Redskins in exchange for defensive end Jeremy Jarmon. Jarmon was later waived on September 4.
- August 1: The Broncos acquired defensive tackle Brodrick Bunkley from the Philadelphia Eagles in exchange for an undisclosed 2013 draft selection.
- October 17: Wide receiver Brandon Lloyd was traded to the St. Louis Rams in exchange for a sixth-round selection in the 2012 NFL draft; the selection was later upgraded to a fifth-rounder after a condition was met in which Lloyd made a minimum of 30 receptions with the Rams.

=== Injuries ===
- July 27: Wide receiver Demaryius Thomas was placed on the non-football injury list. Thomas suffered a ruptured Achilles tendon shortly after the end of the 2010 season, and had surgery back in February. Thomas later suffered a broken finger during practice on September 8, and missed the first six weeks of the regular season.
- August 15: Defensive tackles Marcus Thomas and Ty Warren each sustained separate injuries in practice. Thomas suffered a strained pectoral muscle, and missed the first four weeks of the regular season. Warren suffered torn triceps, and was initially expected to return in November, but was placed on the season-ending injured reserve on September 17.
- August 27: Linebacker D. J. Williams suffered a dislocated elbow during the team's third preseason game vs. the Seattle Seahawks, and missed the first three weeks of the regular season.
- September 2: Cornerback Syd'Quan Thompson suffered a ruptured Achilles tendon during the team's last preseason game at the Arizona Cardinals, and missed the entire 2011 season.
- October 10: Defensive tackle Kevin Vickerson was placed on injured reserve, after suffering an ankle injury during the team's Week 5 loss to the San Diego Chargers the previous day.
- November 14: Running back Knowshon Moreno was placed on injured reserve, after he suffered a torn ACL in his right knee during the team's Week 10 win over the Kansas City Chiefs the previous day.
- November 28: Cornerback/return specialist Cassius Vaughn was placed on injured reserve, after suffering a broken bone in his leg during the team's Week 12 win over the San Diego Chargers the previous day.
- January 2, 2012: Guard Chris Kuper was placed on injured reserve, after suffering a broken leg during the team's regular season finale against the Kansas City Chiefs the previous day.
- January 10, 2012: Fullback Spencer Larsen was placed on injured reserve.

== Staff ==
2011 Denver Broncos staff
| Front office: Owner/chairman/CEO – Pat Bowlen; President – Joe Ellis; Executive vice president of football operations – John Elway; general manager – Brian Xanders; Director of football administration – Mike Bluem; Director of college scouting – Matt Russell; Director of pro personnel – Keith Kidd; Assistant director of college scouting – Lenny McGill; Assistant director of pro personnel – Anthony Kelly; Director of player development – Jerry Butler; Head coaches: Head coach – John Fox; Assistant to head coach – Mark Thewes; Offensive coaches: Offensive coordinator – Mike McCoy; Quarterbacks – Adam Gase; Running backs – Eric Studesville; Wide receivers – Tyke Tolbert; Tight ends – Clancy Barone; Offensive line – Dave Magazu; Offensive quality control – Brian Callahan | Defensive coaches: Defensive coordinator – Dennis Allen; Defensive line – Wayne Nunnely; Linebackers – Richard Smith; Secondary – Ron Milus; Assistant secondary – Sam Garnes; Defensive quality control – Jay Rodgers; Special teams coaches: Special teams coordinator – Jeff Rodgers; Assistant special teams – Keith Burns; Strength and conditioning: Strength and conditioning – Rich Tuten; Strength and conditioning assistant – Justin Lovett; Strength and conditioning assistant – Greg Saporta |

== Final roster ==
2011 Denver Broncos roster
| Quarterbacks (QB): 9 Brady Quinn; 15 Tim Tebow; Running backs (RB): 35 Lance Ball; 37 Jeremiah Johnson; 23 Willis McGahee; 46 Spencer Larsen FB; 40 Austin Sylvester; Wide receivers (WR): 87 Eric Decker; 19 Eddie Royal; 88 Demaryius Thomas; 12 Matt Willis; Tight ends (TE): 86 Daniel Fells; 85 Virgil Green; 81 Dante Rosario; 80 Julius Thomas | Offensive linemen (OL): 68 Zane Beadles G; 78 Ryan Clady T; 75 Chris Clark T; 74 Orlando Franklin T; 76 Tony Hills T; 71 Russ Hochstein C; 73 Chris Kuper G; 65 Manny Ramirez G; 50 J. D. Walton C; Defensive linemen (DL): 91 Robert Ayers DE; 77 Brodrick Bunkley DT; 92 Elvis Dumervil DE; 95 Derrick Harvey DE; 90 Jason Hunter DE; 98 Ryan McBean DE; 79 Marcus Thomas DT; 96 Mitch Unrein DT | Linebackers (LB): 57 Mario Haggan OLB; 56 Nate Irving MLB; 51 Joe Mays MLB; 58 Von Miller OLB; 53 Mike Mohamed OLB; 55 D. J. Williams; 52 Wesley Woodyard OLB; Defensive backs (DB): 24 Champ Bailey CB; 30 David Bruton FS; 36 Rafael Bush SS; 28 Quinton Carter S; 32 Tony Carter CB; 20 Brian Dawkins SS; 21 André Goodman CB; 25 Chris Harris Jr. CB; 34 Kyle McCarthy SS; 26 Rahim Moore FS; 29 Jonathan Wilhite CB; Special teams (ST): 66 Lonie Paxton LS; 4 Britton Colquitt P; 5 Matt Prater K | Practice squad: 97 Jeremy Beal DE; 16 D'Andre Goodwin WR; 67 Adam Grant T; 84 Cornelius Ingram TE; 33 Xavier Omon RB; 14 Greg Orton WR; 93 Sealver Siliga DT; 2 Adam Weber QB; Reserve: 83 Mark Dell WR (IR); 42 Mario Fannin RB (IR); -- Ben Garland DE (Military); 27 Knowshon Moreno RB (IR); 22 Syd'Quan Thompson CB (IR); 41 Cassius Vaughn CB (IR); 99 Kevin Vickerson DT (IR); 94 Ty Warren DT (IR); Rookies in italics 53 active, 8 reserve, 8 practice squad |

== Preseason ==
| Week | Date | Opponent | Result | Record | Venue | Recap |
|---|---|---|---|---|---|---|
| 1 | August 11 | at Dallas Cowboys | L 23–24 | 0–1 | Cowboys Stadium | Recap |
| 2 | August 20 | Buffalo Bills | W 24–10 | 1–1 | Sports Authority Field at Mile High | Recap |
| 3 | August 27 | Seattle Seahawks | W 23–20 | 2–1 | Sports Authority Field at Mile High | Recap |
| 4 | September 1 | at Arizona Cardinals | L 7–26 | 2–2 | University of Phoenix Stadium | Recap |

== Regular season ==
=== Schedule ===
| Week | Date | Opponent | Result | Record | Venue | Recap |
|---|---|---|---|---|---|---|
| 1 | September 12 | **Oakland Raiders** | **L** 20–23 | 0–1 | Sports Authority Field at Mile High | Recap |
| 2 | September 18 | Cincinnati Bengals | **W** 24–22 | 1–1 | Sports Authority Field at Mile High | Recap |
| 3 | September 25 | at Tennessee Titans | **L** 14–17 | 1–2 | LP Field | Recap |
| 4 | October 2 | at Green Bay Packers | **L** 23–49 | 1–3 | Lambeau Field | Recap |
| 5 | October 9 | **San Diego Chargers** | **L** 24–29 | 1–4 | Sports Authority Field at Mile High | Recap |
| 6 | Bye | | | | | |
| 7 | October 23 | at Miami Dolphins | **W** 18–15 (OT) | 2–4 | Sun Life Stadium | Recap |
| 8 | October 30 | Detroit Lions | **L** 10–45 | 2–5 | Sports Authority Field at Mile High | Recap |
| 9 | November 6 | at **Oakland Raiders** | **W** 38–24 | 3–5 | O.co Coliseum | Recap |
| 10 | November 13 | at **Kansas City Chiefs** | **W** 17–10 | 4–5 | Arrowhead Stadium | Recap |
| 11 | November 17 | New York Jets | **W** 17–13 | 5–5 | Sports Authority Field at Mile High | Recap |
| 12 | November 27 | at **San Diego Chargers** | **W** 16–13 (OT) | 6–5 | Qualcomm Stadium | Recap |
| 13 | December 4 | at Minnesota Vikings | **W** 35–32 | 7–5 | Mall of America Field | Recap |
| 14 | December 11 | Chicago Bears | **W** 13–10 (OT) | 8–5 | Sports Authority Field at Mile High | Recap |
| 15 | December 18 | New England Patriots | **L** 23–41 | 8–6 | Sports Authority Field at Mile High | Recap |
| 16 | December 24 | at Buffalo Bills | **L** 14–40 | 8–7 | Ralph Wilson Stadium | Recap |
| 17 | January 1 | **Kansas City Chiefs** | **L** 3–7 | 8–8 | Sports Authority Field at Mile High | Recap |

Note: Intra-division opponents are in bold text.

=== Game summaries ===
==== Week 1: vs. Oakland Raiders ====
Week One: Oakland Raiders at Denver Broncos – Game summary

| Quarter | 1 | 2 | 3 | 4 | Total |
|---|---|---|---|---|---|
| **Raiders** | 0 | 16 | 0 | 7 | **23** |
| Broncos | 3 | 0 | 10 | 7 | **20** |

at Sports Authority Field at Mile High, Denver, Colorado

- Date: September 12
- Game time: 8:15 p.m. MDT
- Game weather: 75 °F (24 °C), partly cloudy
- Game attendance: 75,671
- Referee: Jerome Boger
- TV announcers (ESPN): Brad Nessler and Trent Dilfer
- Recap, Gamebook

Game information

**First quarter**

- DEN – 9:55 Matt Prater 28-yard FG. Drive: 4 plays, 5 yards, 0:55. (DEN 3–0)

**Second quarter**

- OAK – 13:28 Marcel Reece 3-yard TD pass from Jason Campbell, Sebastian Janikowski kick. Drive: 8 plays, 42 yards, 4:34. (OAK 7–3)
- OAK – 11:14 Sebastian Janikowski 37-yard FG. Drive: 4 plays, 4 yards, 2:09. (OAK 10–3)
- OAK – 1:27 Sebastian Janikowski 21-yard FG. Drive: 11 plays, 51 yards, 2:45. (OAK 13–3)
- OAK – 0:00 Sebastian Janikowski 63-yard FG. Drive: 3 plays, 31 yards, 0:24. (OAK 16–3)

**Third quarter**

- DEN – 12:31 Eric Decker 90-yard punt return for a TD, Matt Prater kick. (OAK 16–10)
- DEN – 1:55 Matt Prater 30-yard FG. Drive: 12 plays, 77 yards, 4:56. (OAK 16–13)

**Fourth quarter**

- OAK – 12:33 Jason Campbell 1-yard TD run, Sebastian Janikowski kick. Drive: 3 plays, 65 yards, 1:38. (OAK 23–13)
- DEN – 3:43 Lance Ball 9-yard TD pass from Kyle Orton, Matt Prater kick. Drive: 12 plays, 80 yards, 3:56. **(OAK 23–20)**

**Top passers**

- OAK – Jason Campbell: 13/22, 105 yards, 1 TD
- DEN – Kyle Orton: 24/26, 304 yards, 1 TD, 1 INT

**Top rushers**

- OAK – Darren McFadden: 22 rushes, 150 yards
- DEN – Knowshon Moreno: 8 rushes, 22 yards

**Top receivers**

- OAK – Darrius Heyward-Bey: 4 receptions, 44 yards
- DEN – Brandon Lloyd: 6 receptions, 89 yards

**Top tacklers**

- OAK – Tyvon Branch, Chris Johnson and Quentin Groves: 5 tackles each (1 assist by Branch)
- DEN – Brian Dawkins: 7 tackles, 2 assists

The Broncos donned their alternate orange jerseys and kicked off their 2011 season at home against their AFC West rival Oakland Raiders, the Broncos' first Week 1 home opener since 2004. The Broncos took an early lead in the first quarter, with a 28-yard field goal by placekicker Matt Prater. The Raiders reeled off 16 unanswered points in the second quarter, with a 3-yard touchdown pass from quarterback Jason Campbell to fullback Marcel Reece, followed by three field goals of 37, 21 and 63 yards by placekicker Sebastian Janikowski, the latter of which tied the record for the longest field goal in NFL history. The Broncos responded in the third quarter, with kick returner Eric Decker returning a punt 90 yards for a touchdown, followed by a 30-yard field goal by Prater. The Raiders increased their lead in the fourth quarter, with a 1-yard touchdown run by Campbell. The Broncos tried to rally, with quarterback Kyle Orton throwing a 9-yard touchdown pass to running back Lance Ball. However, Oakland ran out the clock.

This would be the last time the Broncos lost their season opener and home opener until 2019; their opener that year was also against the Raiders.

==== Week 2: vs. Cincinnati Bengals ====
Week Two: Cincinnati Bengals at Denver Broncos – Game summary

| Quarter | 1 | 2 | 3 | 4 | Total |
|---|---|---|---|---|---|
| Bengals | 0 | 3 | 12 | 7 | **22** |
| **Broncos** | 7 | 3 | 7 | 7 | **24** |

at Sports Authority Field at Mile High, Denver, Colorado

- Date: September 18
- Game time: 2:15 pm. MDT
- Game weather: 69 °F (21 °C), sunny
- Game attendance: 73,281
- Referee: Ed Hochuli
- TV announcers (CBS): Spero Dedes and Steve Beuerlein
- Recap, Gamebook

Game information

**First quarter**

- DEN – 6:30 Willis McGahee 1-yard TD run, Matt Prater kick. Drive: 15 plays, 80 yards, 8:30. (DEN 7–0)

**Second quarter**

- CIN – 6:33 Mike Nugent 45-yard FG. Drive: 6 plays, 14 yards, 3:02. (DEN 7–3)
- DEN – 0:12 Matt Prater 34-yard FG. Drive: 16 plays, 64 yards, 6:21. (DEN 10–3)

**Third quarter**

- DEN – 10:57 Eric Decker 25-yard TD pass from Kyle Orton, Matt Prater kick. Drive: 5 plays, 59 yards, 2:12. (DEN 17–3)
- CIN – 8:54 Mike Nugent 37-yard FG. Drive: 7 plays, 61 yards, 2:03. (DEN 17–6)
- CIN – 3:36 Andre Caldwell 10-yard TD pass from Andy Dalton, two-point pass failed. Drive: 6 plays, 72 yards, 3:14. (DEN 17–12)
- CIN – 1:05 Mike Nugent 23-yard FG. Drive: 4 plays, 9 yards, 1:13. (DEN 17–15)

**Fourth quarter**

- DEN – 13:30 Eric Decker 52-yard TD pass from Kyle Orton. Drive: 5 plays, 80 yards, 2:35. (DEN 24–15)
- CIN – 11:17 A. J. Green 5-yard TD pass from Andy Dalton. Drive: 4 plays, 80 yards, 2:13. **(DEN 24–22)**

**Top passers**

- CIN – Andy Dalton: 27/41, 332 yards, 2 TD
- DEN – Kyle Orton: 15/25, 195 yards, 2 TD

**Top rushers**

- CIN – Cedric Benson: 16 rushes, 59 yards
- DEN – Willis McGahee: 28 rushes, 101 yards

**Top receivers**

- CIN – Jerome Simpson: 4 receptions, 136 yards
- DEN – Eric Decker: 5 receptions, 113 yards

**Top tacklers**

- CIN – Thomas Howard and Michael Johnson: 7 tackles each (1 assist by Howard)
- DEN – Wesley Woodyard: 10 tackles, 3 assists

Following their Monday Night loss to the Raiders, the Broncos remained on home turf to face the Cincinnati Bengals. The Broncos took the lead in the first quarter, with a 1-yard touchdown run by running back Willis McGahee. The Bengals got on the board in the second quarter, with a 45-yard field goal by placekicker Mike Nugent. The Broncos responded, with a 34-yard field goal by placekicker Matt Prater just before halftime. In the third quarter, the Broncos extended their lead, with a 25-yard touchdown pass from quarterback Kyle Orton to wide receiver Eric Decker. The Bengals reeled off 12 unanswered points, with a 37-yard field goal by Nugent, a 10-yard touchdown pass from quarterback Andy Dalton to wide receiver Andre Caldwell (with a failed two-point conversion attempt), followed by a 23-yard field goal by Nugent, narrowing the Broncos' lead to 17–15. In the fourth quarter, the Broncos once again increased their lead, with a 52-yard touchdown pass from Orton to Decker, but the Bengals responded, with a 5-yard touchdown pass from Dalton to wide receiver A. J. Green. The Broncos' defense prevented any more scoring.

==== Week 3: at Tennessee Titans ====
Week Three: Denver Broncos at Tennessee Titans – Game summary

| Quarter | 1 | 2 | 3 | 4 | Total |
|---|---|---|---|---|---|
| Broncos | 7 | 0 | 7 | 0 | **14** |
| **Titans** | 0 | 10 | 0 | 7 | **17** |

at LP Field, Nashville, Tennessee

- Date: September 25
- Game time: 12:00 p.m. CDT/11:00 am. MDT
- Game weather: 73 °F (23 °C), sunny
- Game attendance: 69,143
- Referee: John Parry
- TV announcers (CBS): Bill Macatee and Steve Tasker
- Recap, Gamebook

Game information

**First quarter**

- DEN – 3:45 Matthew Willis 5-yard TD pass from Kyle Orton, Matt Prater kick. Drive: 8 plays, 50 yards, 3:51. (DEN 7–0)

**Second quarter**

- TEN – 11:37 Nate Washington 14-yard TD pass from Matt Hasselbeck, Rob Bironas kick. Drive: 9 plays, 85 yards, 4:05. (tied 7–7)
- TEN – 1:11 Rob Bironas 46-yard FG. Drive: 8 plays, 29 yards, 2:39. (TEN 10–7)

**Third quarter**

- DEN – 1:17 Willis McGahee 5-yard TD pass from Kyle Orton, Matt Prater kick. Drive: 16 plays, 80 yards, 8:09. (DEN 14–10)

**Fourth quarter**

- TEN – 4:24 Daniel Graham 4-yard TD pass from Matt Hasselbeck, Rob Bironas kick. Drive: 7 plays, 95 yards, 3:30. **(TEN 17–14)**

**Top passers**

- DEN – Kyle Orton: 24/29, 173 yards, 1 TD, 2 INT
- TEN – Matt Hasselbeck: 27/36, 311 yards, 2 TD

**Top rushers**

- DEN – Willis McGahee: 22 rushes, 52 yards
- TEN – Chris Johnson: 13 rushes, 21 yards

**Top receivers**

- DEN – Eric Decker: 7 receptions, 48 yards
- TEN – Nate Washington: 8 receptions, 92 yards, 1 TD

**Top tacklers**

- DEN – Jonathan Wilhite and Wesley Woodyard: 6 tackles each, 3 assists by Woodyard, 1 sack by Wilhite
- TEN – Jordan Babineaux: 6 tackles, 2 assists

Following their close win over the Bengals, the Broncos traveled to Nashville to face the Tennessee Titans at LP Field. The Broncos took the lead in the first quarter, with a 5-yard touchdown pass from quarterback Kyle Orton to wide receiver Matthew Willis. The Titans responded in the second quarter, with a 14-yard touchdown pass from quarterback Matt Hasselbeck to wide receiver Nate Washington, followed by a 46-yard field goal by placekicker Rob Bironas. The Broncos re-claimed the lead in the third quarter, when Orton connecting with running back Willis McGahee on a 5-yard touchdown pass. However, after recovering a Hasselbeck fumble in Titans' territory late in the third quarter, the Broncos failed to capitalize on the turnover, as Tennessee's defense denied the Broncos from extending their lead with a goal-line stand in the fourth quarter. The Titans later claimed the lead, when Hasselbeck, playing on his 36th birthday, threw a 4-yard touchdown pass to tight end Daniel Graham, who played with the Broncos from 2007 to 2010. Tennessee's defense thwarted the Broncos' final drive.

==== Week 4: at Green Bay Packers ====
Week Four: Denver Broncos at Green Bay Packers – Game summary

| Quarter | 1 | 2 | 3 | 4 | Total |
|---|---|---|---|---|---|
| Broncos | 3 | 14 | 0 | 6 | **23** |
| **Packers** | 14 | 14 | 14 | 7 | **49** |

at Lambeau Field, Green Bay, Wisconsin

- Date: October 2
- Game time: 3:15 pm. CDT/2:15 pm. MDT
- Game weather: 67 °F (19 °C), sunny
- Game attendance: 70,529
- Referee: Scott Green
- TV announcers (CBS): Jim Nantz and Phil Simms
- Recap, Gamebook

Game information

**First quarter**

- DEN – 5:22 Matt Prater 27-yard FG. Drive: 12 plays, 78 yards, 6:28. (DEN 3–0)
- GB – 2:08 Jordy Nelson 50-yard TD pass from Aaron Rodgers, Mason Crosby kick. Drive: 6 plays, 79 yards, 3:14. (GB 7–3)
- GB – 0:50 Charles Woodson 30-yard interception return for a TD, Mason Crosby kick. (GB 14–3)

**Second quarter**

- GB – 12:18 Aaron Rodgers 11-yard TD run, Mason Crosby kick. Drive: 7 plays, 53 yards, 3:32. (GB 21–3)
- DEN – 10:27 Eric Decker 5-yard TD pass from Kyle Orton, Matt Prater kick. Drive: 4 plays, 69 yards, 1:51. (GB 21–10)
- DEN – 3:21 Eric Decker 33-yard TD pass from Kyle Orton, Matt Prater kick. Drive: 8 plays, 71 yards, 4:58. (GB 21–17)
- GB – 0:24 Greg Jennings 17-yard TD pass from Aaron Rodgers, Mason Crosby kick. Drive: 10 plays, 80 yards, 2:57. (GB 28–17)

**Third quarter**

- GB – 8:26 Aaron Rodgers 8-yard TD run, Mason Crosby kick. Drive: 12 plays, 80 yards, 6:34. (GB 35–17)
- GB – 1:12 James Jones 16-yard TD pass from Aaron Rodgers, Mason Crosby kick. Drive: 5 plays, 86 yards, 4:09. (GB 42–17)

**Fourth quarter**

- GB – 7:46 Donald Driver 8-yard TD pass from Aaron Rodgers, Mason Crosby kick. Drive: 8 plays, 46 yards, 4:09. (GB 49–17)
- DEN – 3:02 Daniel Fells 7-yard TD pass from Kyle Orton, two-point run failed. Drive: 12 plays, 78 yards, 4:44. **(GB 49–23)**

**Top passers**

- DEN – Kyle Orton: 22/32, 273 yards, 3 TD, 3 INT
- GB – Aaron Rodgers: 29/38, 408 yards, 4 TD, 1 INT

**Top rushers**

- DEN – Willis McGahee: 15 rushes, 103 yards
- GB – James Starks: 13 rushes, 63 yards

**Top receivers**

- DEN – Brandon Lloyd: 8 receptions, 136 yards
- GB – Greg Jennings: 7 receptions, 136 yards, 1 TD

**Top tacklers**

- DEN – D. J. Williams: 7 tackles, 1 assist
- GB – Desmond Bishop: 9 tackles, 1 assist, 1 sack, 1 forced fumble

Hoping to avenge their loss at Tennessee, the Broncos traveled to Lambeau Field to face the defending Super Bowl champion Green Bay Packers. The Broncos took the early lead, with a 27-yard field goal by placekicker Matt Prater. However, the Packers responded, with a 50-yard touchdown pass from quarterback Aaron Rodgers to wide receiver Jordy Nelson, followed by cornerback Charles Woodson returning an interception off Broncos' quarterback Kyle Orton 30 yards for a touchdown. After recovering an onside kick, the Packers added to their lead early in the second quarter, with Rodgers scrambling 11 yards for a touchdown. The Broncos responded, with Orton throwing two touchdown passes to wide receiver Eric Decker: a 5-yarder, followed by a 33-yarder. The Packers responded just before halftime, when Rodgers connected on a 17-yard touchdown pass to wide receiver Greg Jennings. The Packers increased their lead on the opening possession of the third quarter, with Rodgers scrambling for an 8-yard touchdown run, followed by a 16-yard touchdown pass from Rodgers to wide receiver James Jones. The Packers continued their onslaught in the fourth quarter, with Rodgers hooking up with wide receiver Donald Driver on an 8-yard touchdown pass. The Broncos scored a late touchdown, when Orton connected with tight end Daniel Fells on a 7-yard touchdown pass (with a failed two-point conversion attempt), but the outcome of the game had already been decided in Green Bay's favor. The loss drops the Broncos to 0–4–1 all-time in Green Bay.

==== Week 5: vs. San Diego Chargers ====
Week Five: San Diego Chargers at Denver Broncos – Game summary

| Quarter | 1 | 2 | 3 | 4 | Total |
|---|---|---|---|---|---|
| **Chargers** | 6 | 17 | 0 | 6 | **29** |
| Broncos | 7 | 3 | 0 | 14 | **24** |

at Sports Authority Field at Mile High, Denver, Colorado

- Date: October 9
- Game time: 2:15 pm. MDT
- Game weather: 52 °F (11 °C), mostly sunny
- Game attendance: 74,895
- Referee: Gene Steratore
- TV announcers (CBS): Marv Albert and Rich Gannon
- Recap, Gamebook

Game information

**First quarter**

- SD – 8:37 Nick Novak 24-yard FG. Drive: 9 plays, 46 yards, 4:54. (SD 3–0)
- DEN – 5:58 Cassius Vaughn 55-yard interception return for a TD, Matt Prater kick. (DEN 7–3)
- SD – 0:45 Nick Novak 32-yard FG. Drive: 10 plays, 66 yards, 5:13. (DEN 7–6)

**Second quarter**

- DEN – 11:10 Matt Prater 35-yard FG. Drive: 11 plays, 63 yards, 4:35. (DEN 10–6)
- SD – 7:19 Philip Rivers 2-yard TD run, Nick Novak kick. Drive: 7 plays, 80 yards, 3:51. (SD 13–10)
- SD – 1:47 Nick Novak 28-yard FG. Drive: 8 plays, 56 yards, 3:42. (SD 16–10)
- SD – 0:13 Malcom Floyd 42-yard TD pass from Philip Rivers, Nick Novak kick. Drive: 5 plays, 54 yards, 0:49. (SD 23–10)

**Third quarter**

- No scoring plays

**Fourth quarter**

- SD – 13:35 Nick Novak 51-yard FG. Drive: 9 plays, 30 yards, 4:13. (SD 26–10)
- DEN – 6:35 Tim Tebow 12-yard TD run, Willis McGahee run for a two-point conversion. Drive: 4 plays, 51 yards, 2:19. (SD 26–18)
- DEN – 3:19 Knowshon Moreno 28-yard TD pass from Tim Tebow, two-point pass failed. Drive: 3 plays, 41 yards, 1:19. (SD 26–24)
- SD – 0:24 Nick Novak 35-yard FG. Drive: 9 plays, 63 yards, 2:55. **(SD 29–24)**

**Top passers**

- SD – Philip Rivers: 18/29, 250 yards, 1 TD, 1 INT
- DEN – Tim Tebow: 4/10, 79 yards, 1 TD

**Top rushers**

- SD – Ryan Mathews: 24 rushes, 125 yards
- DEN – Willis McGahee: 16 yards, 125 yards

**Top receivers**

- SD – Malcom Floyd: 3 receptions, 100 yards, 1 TD
- DEN – Daniel Fells: 3 receptions, 47 yards

**Top tacklers**

- SD – Donald Butler, Antoine Cason and Takeo Spikes: 4 tackles each (1 assist by Spikes)
- DEN – Joe Mays: 8 tackles, 1 assist

Hoping to rebound from their blowout loss at Green Bay, the Broncos returned home for an AFC West duel with the San Diego Chargers. The Chargers took the early lead in the first quarter, with a 24-yard field goal by placekicker Nick Novak. The Broncos grabbed the lead, when cornerback Cassius Vaughn returned an interception off Chargers' quarterback Philip Rivers 55 yards for a touchdown. The Chargers responded, with a 32-yard field goal by Novak. The Broncos extended their lead in the second quarter, with a 32-yard field goal by placekicker Matt Prater. However, the Chargers reclaimed the lead, with a 2-yard touchdown run by Rivers, a 28-yard field goal by Novak, followed by a 42-yard touchdown pass from Rivers to wide receiver Malcom Floyd, giving San Diego a 23–10 halftime lead. The Broncos benched quarterback Kyle Orton in favor of Tim Tebow. After a scoreless third quarter, the Chargers added to their lead, with a 51-yard field goal by Novak. The Broncos responded, when Tebow scrambled for a 12-yard touchdown (with a two-point conversion run by running back Willis McGahee), then threw a 28-yard touchdown pass to running back Knowshon Moreno (with a failed two-point conversion attempt), to pull the Broncos to within 26–24 with just over three minutes left in the game. The Chargers responded, with a 35-yard field goal by Novak. The Broncos tried to rally with 24 seconds remaining in regulation, but Tebow's last-second desperation pass into the end zone was unsuccessful, sealing the win for San Diego.

Injuries

Defensive tackle Kevin Vickerson suffering an ankle injury early in the game. Though he later returned, he was placed on injured reserve one day later (October 10).

==== Week 7: at Miami Dolphins ====
Week Seven: Denver Broncos at Miami Dolphins – Game summary

| Quarter | 1 | 2 | 3 | 4 | OT | Total |
|---|---|---|---|---|---|---|
| **Broncos** | 0 | 0 | 0 | 15 | 3 | **18** |
| Dolphins | 0 | 6 | 0 | 9 | 0 | **15** |

at Sun Life Stadium, Miami Gardens, Florida

- Date: October 23
- Game time: 1:00 p.m. EDT/11:00 am. MDT
- Game weather: 77 °F (25 °C), sunny
- Game attendance: 63,800
- Referee: Clete Blakeman
- TV announcers (CBS): Kevin Harlan and Solomon Wilcots
- Recap, Gamebook

Game information

**First quarter**

- No scoring plays

**Second quarter**

- MIA – 14:18 Dan Carpenter 38-yard FG. Drive: 10 plays, 41 yards, 2:26. (MIA 3–0)
- MIA – 2:46 Dan Carpenter 36-yard FG. Drive: 6 plays, 22 yards, 3:13. (MIA 6–0)

**Third quarter**

- No scoring plays

**Fourth quarter**

- MIA – 15:00 Anthony Fasano 16-yard TD pass from Matt Moore, two-point pass failed. Drive: 11 plays, 72 yards, 6:31. (MIA 12–0)
- MIA – 7:34 Dan Carpenter 43-yard FG. Drive: 9 plays, 50 yards, 5:05. (MIA 15–0)
- DEN – 2:44 Demaryius Thomas 5-yard TD pass from Tim Tebow, Matt Prater kick. Drive: 8 plays, 80 yards, 2:39. (MIA 15–7)
- DEN – 0:17 Daniel Fells 3-yard TD pass from Tim Tebow, Tim Tebow run for a two-point conversion. Drive: 10 plays, 56 yards, 2:27. (tied 15–15)

**Overtime**

- DEN – 7:24 Matt Prater 52-yard FG. Drive: 4 plays, 2 yards, 2:06. **(DEN 18–15)**

**Top passers**

- DEN – Tim Tebow: 13/27, 161 yards, 2 TD
- MIA – Matt Moore: 22/33, 197 yards, 1 TD

**Top rushers**

- DEN – Willis McGahee: 18 rushes, 76 yards
- MIA – Daniel Thomas: 19 rushes, 53 yards

**Top receivers**

- DEN – Matthew Willis: 1 reception, 42 yards
- MIA – Brandon Marshall: 6 receptions, 61 yards

**Top tacklers**

- DEN – Jonathan Wilhite: 10 tackles, 1 assist
- MIA – Karlos Dansby: 8 tackles, 5 assists

Hoping to snap their three-game losing streak, and coming off their bye week, the Broncos traveled to face the Miami Dolphins in Sun Life Stadium, where the Broncos had never won in their franchise history except against another team, the Atlanta Falcons in Super Bowl XXXIII. After a scoreless first quarter, the Dolphins grabbed the lead in the second quarter, with field goals of 38 and 36 yards by kicker Dan Carpenter. After a scoreless third quarter, the Dolphins extended their lead in the fourth quarter, with quarterback Matt Moore throwing a 16-yard touchdown pass to tight end Anthony Fasano (with a failed two-point conversion attempt), followed by a 43-yard field goal by Carpenter, giving Miami a 15–0 lead. However, after each team traded punts, the Broncos staged a rally with just over five minutes remaining, with quarterback Tim Tebow throwing a 5-yard touchdown pass to wide receiver Demaryius Thomas to pull to within 15–7 with 2:44 remaining. After the Broncos recovered an onside kick, they subsequently marched down the field, with Tebow connecting on a 3-yard touchdown pass to tight end Daniel Fells, followed by Tebow scrambling for the two-point conversion to send the game into overtime. On the Dolphins' second possession in overtime, Broncos' linebacker D. J. Williams forced a fumble off Moore, giving the Broncos possession at the Dolphins' 36-yard line. Four plays later, kicker Matt Prater, who had missed two field goals in the first half, nailed the game-winning 52-yard field goal.

Notes

With the win, the Broncos earned their 400th win in franchise history, their first-ever win over the Dolphins at Miami in eight tries, and became the first team in NFL history since the AFL–NFL merger to win a game after trailing by 15 or more points with less than three minutes remaining in the fourth quarter.

==== Week 8: vs. Detroit Lions ====
Week Eight: Detroit Lions at Denver Broncos – Game summary

| Quarter | 1 | 2 | 3 | 4 | Total |
|---|---|---|---|---|---|
| **Lions** | 7 | 17 | 14 | 7 | **45** |
| Broncos | 3 | 0 | 0 | 7 | **10** |

at Sports Authority Field at Mile High, Denver, Colorado

- Date: October 30
- Game time: 2:05 pm. MDT
- Game weather: 56 °F (13 °C), sunny
- Game attendance: 74,977
- Referee: Walt Coleman
- TV announcers (Fox): Dick Stockton, John Lynch and Jaime Maggio
- Recap, Gamebook

Game information

**First quarter**

- DEN – 11:20 Matt Prater 39-yard FG. Drive: 8 plays, 59 yards, 3:40. (DEN 3–0)
- DET – 8:40 Titus Young 41-yard TD pass from Matthew Stafford, Jason Hanson kick. Drive: 6 plays, 80 yards, 2:40. (DET 7–3)

**Second quarter**

- DET – 14:44 Jason Hanson 50-yard FG. Drive: 7 plays, 57 yards, 2:34. (DET 10–3)
- DET – 4:11 Tony Scheffler 1-yard TD pass from Matthew Stafford, Jason Hanson kick. Drive: 8 plays, 68 yards, 4:39. (DET 17–3)
- DET – 0:29 Maurice Morris 1-yard TD run, Jason Hanson kick. Drive: 7 plays, 49 yards, 1:36. (DET 24–3)

**Third quarter**

- DET – 13:26 Cliff Avril 24-yard fumble return, Jason Hanson kick. (DET 31–3)
- DET – 6:18 Calvin Johnson 56-yard TD from Matthew Stafford, Jason Hanson kick. Drive: 2 plays, 67 yards, 0:48. (DET 38–3)

**Fourth quarter**

- DET – 12:04 Chris Houston 100-yard interception return for a TD, Jason Hanson kick. (DET 45–3)
- DEN – 8:19 Eric Decker 14-yard TD pass from Tim Tebow, Matt Prater kick. Drive: 9 plays, 80 yards, 3:45. **(DET 45–10)**

**Top passers**

- DET – Matthew Stafford: 21/30, 267 yards, 3 TD
- DEN – Tim Tebow: 18/39, 172 yards, 1 TD, 1 INT

**Top rushers**

- DET – Maurice Morris: 13 rushes, 58 yards, 1 TD
- DEN – Knowshon Moreno: 14 rushes, 69 yards

**Top receivers**

- DET – Calvin Johnson: 6 receptions, 125 yards, 1 TD
- DEN – Eric Decker: 6 receptions, 72 yards, 1 TD

**Top tacklers**

- DET – Amari Spievey and Stephen Tulloch: 6 tackles each (2 assists and 1 sack by Tulloch)
- DEN – Chris Harris, Jr.: 6 tackles, 3 assists

Hoping to build on the momentum of their comeback win at Miami, the Broncos donned their alternate orange jerseys and returned home for an interconference duel with the Detroit Lions. The Broncos grabbed the early lead in the first quarter, with a 39-yard field goal by placekicker Matt Prater. However, the Lions dominated the remainder of the game, beginning with a 41-yard touchdown pass from quarterback Matthew Stafford to wide receiver Titus Young, followed in the second quarter by a 50-yard field goal by placekicker Jason Hanson, a 1-yard touchdown pass from Stafford to tight end Tony Scheffler and a 1-yard touchdown run from running back Maurice Morris, giving Detroit a 24–3 halftime lead. The Lions continued their domination in the third quarter, with a 24-yard fumble return for a touchdown by defensive end Cliff Avril, a 56-yard touchdown pass from Stafford to wide receiver Calvin Johnson, followed in the fourth quarter by cornerback Chris Houston returning an interception off Broncos' quarterback Tim Tebow 100 yards for a touchdown. The Broncos finally got into the end zone, with Tebow throwing a 14-yard touchdown pass to wide receiver Eric Decker, but the outcome of the game had already been decided in Detroit's favor.

==== Week 9: at Oakland Raiders ====
Week Nine: Denver Broncos at Oakland Raiders – Game summary

| Quarter | 1 | 2 | 3 | 4 | Total |
|---|---|---|---|---|---|
| **Broncos** | 7 | 0 | 17 | 14 | **38** |
| Raiders | 3 | 14 | 7 | 0 | **24** |

at O.co Coliseum, Oakland, California

- Date: November 6
- Game time: 2:05 pm. MST/1:05 p.m. PST
- Game weather: 62 °F (17 °C), partly cloudy
- Game attendance: 58,125
- Referee: John Parry
- TV announcers (CBS): Greg Gumbel and Dan Dierdorf
- Recap, Gamebook

Game information

**First quarter**

- OAK – 7:35 Sebastian Janikowski 48-yard FG. Drive: 7 plays, 43 yards, 4:08. (OAK 3–0)
- DEN – 1:11 Eric Decker 27-yard TD pass from Tim Tebow, Matt Prater kick. Drive: 5 plays, 65 yards, 2:06. (DEN 7–3)

**Second quarter**

- OAK – 10:42 Michael Bush 11-yard TD pass from Carson Palmer, Sebastian Janikowski kick. Drive: 3 plays, 14 yards, 1:38. (OAK 10–7)
- OAK – 1:30 Marcel Reece 40-yard TD pass from Carson Palmer, Sebastian Janikowski kick. Drive: 4 plays, 72 yards, 1:16. (OAK 17–7)

**Third quarter**

- DEN – 10:48 Eddie Royal 26-yard TD pass from Tim Tebow, Matt Prater kick. Drive: 9 plays, 80 yards, 4:12. (OAK 17–14)
- OAK – 6:41 Jacoby Ford 18-yard TD pass from Carson Palmer, Sebastian Janikowski kick. Drive: 8 plays, 80 yards, 4:07. (OAK 24–14)
- DEN – 2:52 Matt Prater 43-yard FG. Drive: 7 plays, 52 yards, 3:49. (OAK 24–17)
- DEN – 0:00 Willis McGahee 60-yard TD run, Matt Prater kick. Drive: 1 play, 60 yards, 0:07. (tied 24–24)

**Fourth quarter**

- DEN – 5:53 Eddie Royal 85-yard punt return for a TD, Matt Prater kick. (DEN 31–24)
- DEN – 1:53 Willis McGahee 24-yard TD run, Matt Prater kick. Drive: 4 plays, 77 yards, 2:02. **(DEN 38–24)**

**Top passers**

- DEN – Tim Tebow: 10/21, 124 yards, 2 TD
- OAK – Carson Palmer: 19/35, 332 yards, 3 TD, 3 INT

**Top rushers**

- DEN – Willis McGahee: 20 rushes, 163 yards, 2 TD
- OAK – Michael Bush: 19 rushes, 96 yards

**Top receivers**

- DEN – Eric Decker: 3 receptions, 47 yards, 1 TD
- OAK – Jacoby Ford: 5 receptions, 105 yards, 1 TD

**Top tacklers**

- DEN – Chris Harris, Jr.: 9 tackles, 2 assists
- OAK – Lamarr Houston and Kamerion Wimbley: 6 tackles each (1 assist by Houston)

Hoping to rebound from their disastrous home loss to the Lions, the Broncos traveled to the O.co Coliseum for an AFC West rematch with the Oakland Raiders. In the first quarter, the Raiders grabbed the early lead, with a 48-yard field goal by placekicker Sebastian Janikowski. The Broncos responded, with quarterback Tim Tebow hooking up with wide receiver Eric Decker on a 27-yard touchdown pass. The Raiders re-claimed the lead in the second quarter, with quarterback Carson Palmer throwing two touchdown passes: an 11-yarder to running back Michael Bush, followed by a 40-yarder to fullback Marcel Reece. In the third quarter, the Broncos cut into the Raiders' lead, with a 26-yard touchdown pass from Tebow to wide receiver Eddie Royal. The Raiders responded, with Palmer throwing an 18-yard touchdown pass to wide receiver Jacoby Ford, giving Oakland a 24–14 lead. However, the Broncos dominated the remainder of the game, beginning with a 43-yard field goal by placekicker Matt Prater, followed by running back Willis McGahee rushing for a 60-yard touchdown at the end of the third quarter. The Broncos grabbed the lead with six minutes remaining in the fourth quarter, when Royal returned a punt 85 yards for a touchdown, then pulled away with a 24-yard touchdown run by McGahee.

==== Week 10: at Kansas City Chiefs ====
Week Ten: Denver Broncos at Kansas City Chiefs – Game summary

| Quarter | 1 | 2 | 3 | 4 | Total |
|---|---|---|---|---|---|
| **Broncos** | 7 | 3 | 0 | 7 | **17** |
| Chiefs | 0 | 0 | 7 | 3 | **10** |

at Arrowhead Stadium, Kansas City, Missouri

- Date: November 13
- Game time: 12:00 pm. CST/11:00 am. MST
- Game weather: 67 °F (19 °C), sunny
- Game attendance: 72,908
- Referee: Ron Winter
- TV announcers (CBS): Bill Macatee and Steve Tasker
- Recap, Gamebook

Game information

**First quarter**

- DEN – 7:38 Tim Tebow 7-yard TD run, Matt Prater kick. Drive: 8 plays, 57 yards, 4:11. (DEN 7–0)

**Second quarter**

- DEN – 7:51 Matt Prater 38-yard FG. Drive: 8 plays, 34 yards, 4:32. (DEN 10–0)

**Third quarter**

- KC – 8:15 Le'Ron McClain 1-yard TD pass from Matt Cassel, Ryan Succop kick. Drive: 8 plays, 65 yards, 3:29. (DEN 10–7)

**Fourth quarter**

- DEN – 6:52 Eric Decker 56-yard TD pass from Tim Tebow, Matt Prater kick. Drive: 8 plays, 80 yards, 5:21. (DEN 17–7)
- KC – 0:07 Ryan Succop 32-yard FG. Drive: 8 plays, 55 yards, 1:48. **(DEN 17–10)**

**Top passers**

- DEN – Tim Tebow: 2/8, 69 yards, 1 TD
- KC – Matt Cassel: 13/28, 93 yards, 1 TD

**Top rushers**

- DEN – Lance Ball: 30 rushes, 96 yards
- KC – Jackie Battle: 9 rushes, 61 yards

**Top receivers**

- DEN – Eric Decker: 1 reception, 56 yards, 1 TD
- KC – Dexter McCluster: 6 receptions, 48 yards

**Top tacklers**

- DEN – Joe Mays and Chris Harris, Jr.: 8 tackles each
- KC – Jovan Belcher: 8 tackles, 2 assists

Coming off their win at Oakland, the Broncos traveled to Arrowhead Stadium for an AFC West duel with the Kansas City Chiefs. In the first quarter, the Broncos grabbed the early lead, with quarterback Tim Tebow scrambling for a 7-yard touchdown, followed in the second quarter by a 38-yard field goal by placekicker Matt Prater. The Chiefs got on the board in the third quarter, with a 1-yard touchdown pass from quarterback Matt Cassel to fullback Le'Ron McClain. The Broncos responded in the fourth quarter, with Tebow throwing a 56-yard touchdown pass to wide receiver Eric Decker. The Chiefs tried to rally, with placekicker Ryan Succop nailing a late 32-yard field goal with seven seconds remaining, but the ensuing onside kickoff was unsuccessful, sealing the win for the Broncos.

Notes

With the win, the Broncos matched their win total from 2010.

Injuries

Running back Knowshon Moreno suffered a torn ACL in his right knee during the first quarter, and was placed on injured reserve.

==== Week 11: vs. New York Jets ====
Week Eleven: New York Jets at Denver Broncos – Game summary

| Quarter | 1 | 2 | 3 | 4 | Total |
|---|---|---|---|---|---|
| Jets | 0 | 3 | 7 | 3 | **13** |
| **Broncos** | 3 | 0 | 7 | 7 | **17** |

at Sports Authority Field at Mile High, Denver, Colorado

- Date: November 17
- Game time: 6:20 pm. MST
- Game weather: 54 °F (12 °C), partly cloudy
- Game attendance: 74,746
- Referee: Bill Leavy
- TV announcers (NFLN): Brad Nessler, Mike Mayock and Alex Flanagan
- Recap, Gamebook

Game information

**First quarter**

- DEN – 5:08 Matt Prater 37-yard FG. Drive: 6 plays, 15 yards, 2:55. (DEN 3–0)

**Second quarter**

- NYJ – 12:04 Nick Folk 21-yard FG. Drive: 7 plays, 32 yards, 3:20. (tied 3–3)

**Third quarter**

- NYJ – 10:57 Matt Slauson 1-yard fumble recovery for a TD, Nick Folk kick. Drive: 8 plays, 80 yards, 4:03. (NYJ 10–3)
- DEN – 4:25 André Goodman 26-yard interception return for a TD, Matt Prater kick. (tied 10–10)

**Fourth quarter**

- NYJ – 9:14 Nick Folk 45-yard FG. Drive: 11 plays, 42 yards, 5:34. (NYJ 13–10)
- DEN – 0:58 Tim Tebow 20-yard TD run, Matt Prater kick. Drive: 12 plays, 95 yards, 4:56. **(DEN 17–13)**

**Top passers**

- NYJ – Mark Sanchez: 24/40, 252 yards, 1 INT
- DEN – Tim Tebow: 9/20, 104 yards

**Top rushers**

- NYJ – Joe McKnight: 16 rushes, 59 yards
- DEN – Tim Tebow: 8 rushes, 68 yards, 1 TD

**Top receivers**

- NYJ – Plaxico Burress: 4 receptions, 64 yards
- DEN – Demaryius Thomas: 2 receptions, 37 yards

**Top tacklers**

- NYJ – Sione Pouha: 6 tackles, 1 assist
- DEN – Von Miller: 9 tackles, 1 assist, 1.5 sacks

Coming off their win at Kansas City, the Broncos returned home for an AFC duel against the New York Jets on Thursday Night Football. The Broncos grabbed the lead in the first quarter, with a 37-yard field goal by placekicker Matt Prater. The Jets tied the game in the second quarter, with a 21-yard field goal by placekicker Nick Folk, then grabbed the lead in the third quarter, when guard Matt Slauson returned a fumble off Jets' running back Bilal Powell into the end zone for a touchdown. The Broncos tied the game, when cornerback André Goodman returned an interception off Jets' quarterback Mark Sanchez 26 yards for a touchdown. The Jets re-claimed the lead in the fourth quarter, with a 45-yard field goal by Folk. After each team traded punts, the Broncos got the ball with 5:54 remaining, when quarterback Tim Tebow led the Broncos on a 12-play, 95-yard drive, culminating with Tebow scrambling 20 yards for a touchdown with 58 seconds remaining. The Broncos' defense thwarted Sanchez' last-second desperation pass toward the end zone.

Notes

With the win, the Broncos exceeded their win total from 2010.

==== Week 12: at San Diego Chargers ====
Week Twelve: Denver Broncos at San Diego Chargers – Game summary

| Quarter | 1 | 2 | 3 | 4 | OT | Total |
|---|---|---|---|---|---|---|
| **Broncos** | 0 | 7 | 3 | 3 | 3 | **16** |
| Chargers | 3 | 7 | 3 | 0 | 0 | **13** |

at Qualcomm Stadium, San Diego, California

- Date: November 27
- Game time: 2:15 pm. MST/1:15 pm. PST
- Game weather: 84 °F (29 °C), sunny
- Game attendance: 64,436
- Referee: Jeff Triplette
- TV announcers (CBS): Ian Eagle and Dan Fouts
- Recap, Gamebook

Game information

**First quarter**

- SD – 11:34 Nick Novak 53-yard FG. Drive: 9 plays, 45 yards, 3:26. (SD 3–0)

**Second quarter**

- SD – 7:58 Antonio Gates 6-yard TD pass from Philip Rivers, Nick Novak kick. Drive: 15 plays, 91 yards, 8:47. (SD 10–0)
- DEN – 0:55 Eric Decker 18-yard TD pass from Tim Tebow, Matt Prater kick. Drive: 4 plays, 46 yards, 0:32. SD 10–7)

**Third quarter**

- SD – 9:30 Nick Novak 25-yard FG. Drive: 8 plays, 48 yards, 3:48. (SD 13–7)
- DEN – 0:33 Matt Prater 41-yard FG. Drive: 11 plays, 57 yards, 6:08. (SD 13–10)

**Fourth quarter**

- DEN – 1:34 Matt Prater 24-yard FG. Drive: 9 plays, 68 yards, 3:53. (tied 13–13)

**Overtime**

- DEN – 0:29 Matt Prater 37-yard FG. Drive: 6 plays, 38 yards, 2:02. **(DEN 16–13)**

**Top passers**

- DEN – Tim Tebow: 9/18, 143 yards, 1 TD
- SD – Philip Rivers: 19/36, 188 yards, 1 TD

**Top rushers**

- DEN – Willis McGahee: 23 rushes, 117 yards
- SD – Ryan Mathews: 22 rushes, 137 yards

**Top receivers**

- DEN – Eric Decker: 3 receptions, 65 yards, 1 TD
- SD – Vincent Brown: 3 receptions, 50 yards

**Top tacklers**

- DEN – D. J. Williams: 10 tackles, 2 assists
- SD – Takeo Spikes: 8 tackles, 6 assists

Coming off their win over the Jets, the Broncos traveled to Qualcomm Stadium for an AFC West rematch with the San Diego Chargers. The Chargers jumped out to a 10–0 lead, with a 53-yard field goal by kicker Nick Novak in the first quarter, followed in the second quarter by a 6-yard touchdown pass from quarterback Philip Rivers to tight end Antonio Gates. The Broncos responded just before halftime, with an 18-yard touchdown pass from quarterback Tim Tebow to wide receiver Eric Decker. The Chargers added to their lead in the third quarter, with a 25-yard field goal by Novak. The Broncos countered just before the end of the third quarter, with a 41-yard field goal by kicker Matt Prater. Novak missed a 48-yard field goal early in the fourth quarter. Trailing 13–10 with just over five minutes remaining in the fourth quarter, the Broncos marched down the field and tied the game with a 24-yard field goal by Prater. The Broncos' defense subdued San Diego's final drive of the fourth quarter, sending the game to overtime. On the Chargers' second possession in overtime, Novak's potential game-winning 53-yard field goal was blocked. However, head coach John Fox had called a timeout prior to the kick. Novak missed the second attempt wide right. The Broncos' third possession in overtime began with 2:31 remaining, and Prater nailed the game-winning 37-yard field goal with 29 seconds left in overtime.

Notes

With the win, the Broncos swept their AFC West division rivals on the road for the second time in three seasons.

Injuries

Cornerback Cassius Vaughn suffered a broken bone in his leg, and was placed on injured reserve the following day.

==== Week 13: at Minnesota Vikings ====
Week Thirteen: Denver Broncos at Minnesota Vikings – Game summary

| Quarter | 1 | 2 | 3 | 4 | Total |
|---|---|---|---|---|---|
| **Broncos** | 7 | 0 | 14 | 14 | **35** |
| Vikings | 5 | 10 | 7 | 10 | **32** |

at Mall of America Field at the Hubert H. Humphrey Metrodome, Minneapolis, Minnesota

- Date: December 4
- Game time: 12:00 pm. CST/11:00 am. MST
- Game weather: Played indoors (dome stadium)
- Game attendance: 62,939
- Referee: Terry McAulay
- TV announcers (Fox): Thom Brennaman, Brian Billick and Laura Okmin
- Recap, Gamebook

Game information

**First quarter**

- MIN – 12:44 Jared Allen tackled Willis McGahee in the end zone for a safety. (MIN 2–0)
- DEN – 5:50 Mario Haggan 16-yard interception return for a TD, Matt Prater kick. (DEN 7–2)
- MIN – 1:29 Ryan Longwell 40-yard FG. Drive: 5 plays, 7 yards, 1:58. (DEN 7–5)

**Second quarter**

- MIN – 3:40 Kyle Rudolph 19-yard TD pass from Christian Ponder, Ryan Longwell kick. Drive: 12 plays, 96 yards, 5:57. (MIN 12–7)
- MIN – 0:03 Ryan Longwell 25-yard FG. Drive: 4 plays, 15 yards, 0:39. (MIN 15–7)

**Third quarter**

- DEN – 11:24 Demaryius Thomas 21-yard TD pass from Tim Tebow, Matt Prater kick. Drive: 9 plays, 78 yards, 3:42. (MIN 15–14)
- MIN – 3:22 Percy Harvin 52-yard TD pass from Christian Ponder, Ryan Longwell kick. Drive: 6 plays, 85 yards, 3:23. (MIN 22–14)
- DEN – 3:03 Demaryius Thomas 41-yard TD pass from Tim Tebow, Matt Prater kick. Drive: 1 play, 41 yards, 0:24. (MIN 22–21)

**Fourth quarter**

- MIN – 9:41 Percy Harvin 48-yard TD pass from Christian Ponder, Ryan Longwell kick. Drive: 4 plays, 77 yards, 1:36. (MIN 29–21)
- DEN – 8:52 Willis McGahee 24-yard TD run, Tim Tebow run for a two-point conversion. Drive: 2 plays, 66 yards, 0:49. (tied 29–29)
- MIN – 3:06 Ryan Longwell 39-yard FG. Drive: 13 plays, 59 yards, 5:46. (MIN 32–29)
- DEN – 1:33 Matt Prater 46-yard FG. Drive: 7 plays, 52 yards, 1:33. (tied 32–32)
- DEN – 0:00 Matt Prater 23-yard FG. Drive: 6 plays, 10 yards, 1:25. **(DEN 35–32)**

**Top passers**

- DEN – Tim Tebow: 10/15, 202 yards, 2 TD
- MIN – Christian Ponder: 29/47, 381 yards, 3 TD, 2 INT

**Top rushers**

- DEN – Willis McGahee: 20 rushes, 111 yards, 1 TD
- MIN – Toby Gerhart: 21 rushes, 91 yards

**Top receivers**

- DEN – Demaryius Thomas: 4 receptions, 144 yards, 2 TD
- MIN – Percy Harvin: 8 receptions, 156 yards, 2 TD

**Top tacklers**

- DEN – Mario Haggan: 7 tackles, 5 assists
- MIN – Benny Sapp: 6 tackles

Coming off their overtime win at San Diego, the Broncos traveled to the Mall of America Field at the Hubert H. Humphrey Metrodome for an interconference duel with the Minnesota Vikings. The game's first points came from the Vikings, when defensive end Jared Allen tackled running back Willis McGahee in the end zone for a safety. The Broncos grabbed the lead when linebacker Mario Haggan returned an interception off Vikings' quarterback Christian Ponder 16 yards for a touchdown. Vikings' kicker Ryan Longwell made a 40-yard field goal, then the Vikings reclaimed the lead in the second quarter, on a 19-yard touchdown pass from Ponder to tight end Kyle Rudolph, followed by another field goal by Longwell, this time from 25 yards, just before halftime. The Broncos narrowed Minnesota's lead in the third quarter, with a 21-yard touchdown pass from quarterback Tim Tebow to wide receiver Demaryius Thomas, but the Vikings countered with a 52-yard touchdown pass from Ponder to wide receiver Percy Harvin. The Broncos responded with a 41-yard touchdown pass from Tebow to Thomas. Ponder then threw a 48-yard touchdown pass to Harvin to give Minnesota a 29–21 lead. On the Broncos' next possession, McGahee rushed 24 yards for a touchdown and Tebow scrambled for a two-point conversion to tie the game at 29. The Vikings subsequently reclaimed the lead on Longwell's 39-yard field goal with 3:06 left in the game. The Broncos answered with kicker Matt Prater's 46-yard field goal with 1:33 left to tie the game at 32. On the Vikings' ensuing possession, Broncos' cornerback André Goodman returned an interception off Ponder to the Vikings' 15-yard line. Six plays later, Prater nailed the game-winning 23-yard field goal as time expired to give the Broncos their fifth consecutive win.

Ordinarily, this game would have been televised by CBS, because the Broncos, a member of the AFC, were the away team. However, NBC used its power to "flex" to Sunday night a Detroit Lions at New Orleans Saints game that would otherwise have been televised by Fox. The originally scheduled Sunday night game, Indianapolis Colts at New England Patriots, reverted to 1:00 pm Eastern Time on CBS. The end result of these moves was that Fox only held two 1:00 pm Eastern Time games, jeopardizing its Nielsen ratings in that window, and Fox appealed to the NFL for a remedy. Negotiations between CBS, Fox, and the league resulted in CBS trading this game to Fox in exchange for a later-season Fox game of CBS' choosing.

==== Week 14: vs. Chicago Bears ====
Week Fourteen: Chicago Bears at Denver Broncos – Game summary

| Quarter | 1 | 2 | 3 | 4 | OT | Total |
|---|---|---|---|---|---|---|
| Bears | 0 | 0 | 7 | 3 | 0 | **10** |
| **Broncos** | 0 | 0 | 0 | 10 | 3 | **13** |

at Sports Authority Field at Mile High, Denver, Colorado

- Date: December 11
- Game time: 2:05 pm. MST
- Game weather: 50 °F (10 °C), sunny
- Game attendance: 76,487
- Referee: Carl Cheffers
- TV announcers (Fox): Kenny Albert, Daryl Johnston and Tony Siragusa
- Recap, Gamebook

Game information

**First quarter**

- No scoring plays

**Second quarter**

- No scoring plays

**Third quarter**

- CHI – 5:19 Marion Barber 9-yard TD run, Robbie Gould kick. Drive: 6 plays, 42 yards, 3:15. (CHI 7–0)

**Fourth quarter**

- CHI – 14:55 Robbie Gould 57-yard FG. Drive: 7 plays, 24 yards, 3:53. (CHI 10–0)
- DEN – 2:08 Demaryius Thomas 10-yard TD pass from Tim Tebow, Matt Prater kick. Drive: 7 plays, 63 yards, 2:26. (CHI 10–7)
- DEN – 0:03 Matt Prater 59-yard FG. Drive: 8 plays, 39 yards, 0:53. (tied 10–10)

**Overtime**

- DEN – 8:34 Matt Prater 51-yard FG. Drive: 9 plays, 33 yards, 4:13. **(DEN 13–10)**

**Top passers**

- CHI – Caleb Hanie: 12/19, 115 yards
- DEN – Tim Tebow: 21/40, 236 yards, 1 TD, 1 INT

**Top rushers**

- CHI – Marion Barber: 27 rushes, 108 yards, 1 TD
- DEN – Tim Tebow: 12 rushes, 49 yards

**Top receivers**

- CHI – Johnny Knox: 3 receptions, 37 yards
- DEN – Demaryius Thomas: 7 receptions, 78 yards, 1 TD

**Top tacklers**

- CHI – Brian Urlacher: 10 tackles, 1 assist
- DEN – D. J. Williams: 9 tackles

Coming off their last-second win at Minnesota, the Broncos returned home for an interconference duel with the Chicago Bears. After a scoreless first half, which included Bears' defensive end Julius Peppers blocking a 28-yard field goal attempt by kicker Matt Prater in the second quarter, the Bears grabbed the lead in the third quarter, with running back Marion Barber rushing for a 9-yard touchdown. The Bears extended their lead to 10–0 early in the fourth quarter, with a 57-yard field goal by kicker Robbie Gould. With 4:34 remaining in the fourth quarter, the Broncos put together a 7-play, 63-yard drive, and finally got on the scoreboard with 2:08 remaining, when quarterback Tim Tebow threw a 10-yard touchdown pass to wide receiver Demaryius Thomas. With no timeouts remaining, the Broncos tried an onside kick, but Chicago recovered prior to the two-minute warning. After one running play, the two-minute warning stopped the clock. On the next play, Broncos' linebacker D. J. Williams was able to push Barber out of bounds, saving 40 seconds of time. The Bears eventually punted to the Broncos' 20-yard line with 56 seconds remaining. Tebow subsequently led the Broncos on an 8-play, 39-yard drive, with Prater nailing a game-tying 59-yard field goal to send the game to overtime. This was the first game in NFL history that had two field goals of 57 yards or more. Chicago won the overtime coin toss, however, they deferred, and the Broncos went three-and-out on their first possession. The Bears drove into field goal range on their first overtime possession, but Broncos' linebacker Wesley Woodyard forced a fumble off Barber, with defensive end Elvis Dumervil recovering the fumble. Nine plays later, Prater nailed the game-winning 51-yard field goal.

Notes

In the fourth quarter and overtime, Tim Tebow was 18 of 24 with 191 yards passing and one touchdown. In his first 11 starts, Tebow has six game-winning drives in the fourth quarter or overtime. This is more than any other quarterback since the AFL–NFL merger, and breaks the previous record of five, last accomplished by Jake Delhomme in 1999.

==== Week 15: vs. New England Patriots ====
Week Fifteen: New England Patriots at Denver Broncos – Game summary

| Quarter | 1 | 2 | 3 | 4 | Total |
|---|---|---|---|---|---|
| **Patriots** | 7 | 20 | 7 | 7 | **41** |
| Broncos | 13 | 3 | 0 | 7 | **23** |

at Sports Authority Field at Mile High, Denver, Colorado

- Date: December 18
- Game time: 2:15 pm. MST
- Game weather: 63 °F (17 °C), mostly sunny
- Game attendance: 76,556
- Referee: Mike Carey
- TV announcers (CBS): Jim Nantz and Phil Simms
- Recap, Gamebook

Game information

**First quarter**

- DEN – 9:49 Tim Tebow 9-yard TD run, extra-point snap botched, two-point run failed. Drive: 9 plays, 80 yards, 5:11. (DEN 6–0)
- NE – 7:24 Chad Ochocinco 33-yard TD pass from Tom Brady, Stephen Gostkowski kick. Drive: 5 plays, 80 yards, 2:25. (NE 7–6)
- DEN – 5:01 Lance Ball 32-yard TD run, Matt Prater kick. Drive: 4 plays, 82 yards, 2:23. (DEN 13–7)

**Second quarter**

- DEN – 13:47 Matt Prater 26-yard FG. Drive: 10 plays, 63 yards, 4:24. (DEN 16–7)
- NE – 8:43 Aaron Hernandez 1-yard TD pass from Tom Brady, Stephen Gostkowski kick. Drive: 12 plays, 80 yards, 5:04. (DEN 16–14)
- NE – 5:49 Stephen Gostkowski 21-yard FG. Drive: 6 plays, 16 yards, 2:42. (NE 17–16)
- NE – 1:12 Tom Brady 1-yard TD run, Stephen Gostkowski kick. Drive: 6 plays, 40 yards, 3:20. (NE 24–16)
- NE – 0:00 Stephen Gostkowski 34-yard FG. Drive: 1 play, 0:03. (NE 27–16)

**Third quarter**

- NE – 0:39 Danny Woodhead 10-yard TD run, Stephen Gostkowski kick. Drive: 8 plays, 85 yards, 3:28. (NE 34–16)

**Fourth quarter**

- DEN – 8:41 Tim Tebow 2-yard TD run, Matt Prater kick. Drive: 7 plays, 89 yards, 2:38. (NE 34–23)
- NE – 4:10 BenJarvus Green-Ellis 1-yard TD run, Stephen Gostkowski kick. Drive: 9 plays, 80 yards, 4:31. **(NE 41–23)**

**Top passers**

- NE – Tom Brady: 23/34, 320 yards, 2 TD
- DEN – Tim Tebow: 11/22, 194 yards

**Top rushers**

- NE – Stevan Ridley: 11 rushes, 65 yards
- DEN – Tim Tebow: 12 rushes, 93 yards, 2 TD

**Top receivers**

- NE – Aaron Hernandez: 11 receptions, 129 yards, 1 TD
- DEN – Demaryius Thomas: 7 receptions, 116 yards

**Top tacklers**

- NE – Jerod Mayo: 7 tackles, 1 assist
- DEN – Chris Harris, Jr.: 9 tackles

Coming off their overtime win over the Bears, the Broncos remained on home ground for an AFC duel with the New England Patriots. The Broncos grabbed the early lead, with quarterback Tim Tebow scrambling for a 9-yard touchdown (with a failed two-point conversion attempt after a botched extra-point snap). The Patriots responded, with quarterback Tom Brady throwing a 33-yard touchdown pass to wide receiver Chad Ochocinco. The Broncos countered, with a 32-yard touchdown run by running back Lance Ball, followed in the second quarter by a 26-yard field goal by kicker Matt Prater. However, New England reeled off 27 unanswered points, 17 of which came off three Broncos' turnovers in the second quarter. Brady connected with tight end Aaron Hernandez on a 1-yard touchdown pass, placekicker Stephen Gostkowski nailed a 21-yard field goal, Brady ran a 1-yard quarterback sneak for a touchdown and Gostkowski nailed a 34-yard field goal at the end of the first half. The Patriots added to their lead in the third quarter, with a 10-yard touchdown run by running back Danny Woodhead. The Broncos tried to cut into New England's lead in the fourth quarter, with Tebow scrambling for a 2-yard touchdown, but a 1-yard touchdown run by Patriots' running back BenJarvus Green-Ellis and a sack of Tebow for a loss of 28 yards put the game out of reach.

==== Week 16: at Buffalo Bills ====
Week Sixteen: Denver Broncos at Buffalo Bills – Game summary

| Quarter | 1 | 2 | 3 | 4 | Total |
|---|---|---|---|---|---|
| Broncos | 7 | 0 | 7 | 0 | **14** |
| **Bills** | 0 | 17 | 6 | 17 | **40** |

at Ralph Wilson Stadium, Orchard Park, New York

- Date: December 24
- Game time: 1:00 pm. EST/11:00 am. MST
- Game weather: 30 °F (−1 °C), sunny
- Game attendance: 45,112
- Referee: Walt Anderson
- TV announcers (CBS): Jim Nantz and Phil Simms
- Recap, Gamebook

Game information

**First quarter**

- DEN – 7:13 Tim Tebow 1-yard TD run, Matt Prater kick. Drive: 11 plays, 73 yards, 5:40. (DEN 7–0)

**Second quarter**

- BUF – 6:06 Dave Rayner 28-yard FG. Drive: 7 plays, 59 yards, 2:51. (DEN 7–3)
- BUF – 4:05 Leodis McKelvin 80-yard punt return for a TD, Dave Rayner kick. (BUF 10–7)
- BUF – 0:19 C. J. Spiller 4-yard TD run, Dave Rayner kick. Drive: 5 plays, 58 yards, 1:33. (BUF 17–7)

**Third quarter**

- DEN – 11:42 Daniel Fells 17-yard TD pass from Tim Tebow, Matt Prater kick. Drive: 7 plays, 74 yards, 3:18. (BUF 17–14)
- BUF – 6:19 Dave Rayner 25-yard FG. Drive: 9 plays, 64 yards, 5:23. (BUF 20–14)
- BUF – 2:32 Dave Rayner 25-yard FG. Drive: 7 plays, 56 yards, 2:45. (BUF 23–14)

**Fourth quarter**

- BUF – 13:26 Dave Rayner 29-yard FG. Drive: 6 plays, 16 yards, 1:57. (BUF 26–14)
- BUF – 8:03 Jairus Byrd 37-yard interception return for a TD, Dave Rayner kick. (BUF 33–14)
- BUF – 7:45 Spencer Johnson 17-yard fumble return for a TD, Dave Rayner kick. **(BUF 40–14)**

**Top passers**

- DEN – Tim Tebow: 13/30, 185 yards, 1 TD, 3 INT
- BUF – Ryan Fitzpatrick: 15/27, 196 yards

**Top rushers**

- DEN – Willis McGahee: 15 rushes, 64 yards
- BUF – C. J. Spiller: 16 rushes, 111 yards, 1 TD

**Top receivers**

- DEN – Demaryius Thomas: 4 receptions, 76 yards
- BUF – Stevie Johnson: 4 receptions, 92 yards

**Top tacklers**

- DEN – Chris Harris, Jr.: 7 tackles, 1 assist
- BUF – Chris Kelsay: 6 tackles, 3 assists

Hoping to rebound from their loss to the Patriots, the Broncos traveled to Ralph Wilson Stadium for an AFC duel with the Buffalo Bills. The Broncos grabbed the early lead in the first quarter, with quarterback Tim Tebow scrambling for a 1-yard touchdown. The Bills stormed back, reeling off 17 unanswered points in the second quarter, with a 28-yard field goal by placekicker Dave Rayner, an 80-yard punt return for a touchdown by Leodis McKelvin and a 4-yard touchdown run by running back C. J. Spiller. The Broncos cut into Buffalo's lead early in the third quarter, with Tebow throwing a 17-yard touchdown pass to tight end Daniel Fells. However, the Broncos were held scoreless for the remainder of the game. The Bills added to their lead, with three field goals by Rayner—a pair of 25-yarders in the third quarter, followed by a 29-yarder early in the fourth quarter. The Bills pulled further away, converting two turnovers off Tebow into touchdowns—a 37-yard interception return by safety Jairus Byrd, followed by a 17-yard fumble return by linebacker Spencer Johnson.

==== Week 17: vs. Kansas City Chiefs ====
Week Seventeen: Kansas City Chiefs at Denver Broncos – Game summary

| Quarter | 1 | 2 | 3 | 4 | Total |
|---|---|---|---|---|---|
| **Chiefs** | 7 | 0 | 0 | 0 | **7** |
| Broncos | 0 | 0 | 3 | 0 | **3** |

at Sports Authority Field at Mile High, Denver, Colorado

- Date: January 1
- Game time: 2:15 pm. MST
- Game weather: 35 °F (2 °C), sunny
- Game attendance: 76,005
- Referee: Pete Morelli
- TV announcers (CBS): Jim Nantz and Phil Simms
- Recap, Gamebook

Game information

**First quarter**

- KC – 0:11 Dexter McCluster 21-yard TD run, Ryan Succop kick. Drive: 13 play, 90 yards, 6:22. (KC 7–0)

**Second quarter**

- No scoring plays

**Third quarter**

- DEN – 8:11 Matt Prater 38-yard FG. Drive: 4 plays, 1:30. **(KC 7–3)**

**Fourth quarter**

- No scoring plays

**Top passers**

- KC – Kyle Orton: 15/29, 180 yards
- DEN – Tim Tebow: 6/22, 60 yards, 1 INT

**Top rushers**

- KC – Dexter McCluster: 12 rushes, 61 yards, 1 TD
- DEN – Willis McGahee: 28 rushes, 145 yards

**Top receivers**

- KC – Dwayne Bowe: 6 rushes, 93 yards
- DEN – Demaryius Thomas: 3 receptions, 34 yards

**Top tacklers**

- KC – Justin Houston: 6 tackles, 1 assist, 1.5 sacks
- DEN – Elvis Dumervil: 6 tackles, 2 assists

Hoping to rebound from their tough loss at Buffalo and keep their playoff hopes alive, the Broncos returned home for an AFC West rematch against the Kansas City Chiefs, in the team's regular season finale. This was Chiefs' quarterback Kyle Orton's first visit to Denver since he was waived by the Broncos on November 22. The Chiefs grabbed the early lead in the first quarter, with a 21-yard touchdown run by running back Dexter McCluster. After a scoreless second quarter, which included a fumble by Broncos' quarterback Tim Tebow deep in Chiefs' territory, the Broncos got on the scoreboard in the third quarter, with a 38-yard field goal by placekicker Matt Prater. However, both teams were held scoreless for the remainder of the game. Kansas City's defense thwarted the Broncos' last drive.

Notes

With the loss, the Broncos finished the regular season with an 8–8 record for the third time in four seasons, and were swept at home by their division rivals for the second time in three seasons. The Broncos finished tied with the Oakland Raiders and San Diego Chargers for the AFC West division title. However, the Broncos won the tiebreakers over both teams based on record against common opponents (5–5 to the Raiders' and Chargers' 4–6), thus clinching their first playoff berth and division title since 2005. This was the team's last loss to a division opponent until Week 15 of the 2013 season and last loss to the Chiefs until Week 10 of the 2015 season.

Injuries Guard Chris Kuper suffered a broken leg during the first quarter, and was placed on injured reserve the following day (January 2).

=== Standings ===
==== Division ====
AFC West
| | W | L | T | PCT | DIV | CONF | PF | PA | STK |
|---|---|---|---|---|---|---|---|---|---|
| ^{(4)} Denver Broncos | 8 | 8 | 0 | .500 | 3–3 | 6–6 | 309 | 390 | L3 |
| San Diego Chargers | 8 | 8 | 0 | .500 | 3–3 | 7–5 | 406 | 377 | W1 |
| Oakland Raiders | 8 | 8 | 0 | .500 | 3–3 | 6–6 | 359 | 433 | L1 |
| Kansas City Chiefs | 7 | 9 | 0 | .438 | 3–3 | 4–8 | 212 | 338 | W1 |

==== Conference ====
AFC
| # | Team | Division | W | L | T | PCT | DIV | CONF | SOS | SOV | STK |
|---|---|---|---|---|---|---|---|---|---|---|---|
**Division winners**
| 1 | New England Patriots | East | 13 | 3 | 0 | .813 | 5–1 | 10–2 | .449 | .423 | W8 |
| 2 (Note: Baltimore clinched the AFC North title based on a head-to-head sweep over Pittsburgh.) | Baltimore Ravens | North | 12 | 4 | 0 | .750 | 6–0 | 9–3 | .477 | .484 | W2 |
| 3 | Houston Texans | South | 10 | 6 | 0 | .625 | 4–2 | 8–4 | .453 | .413 | L3 |
| 4 (Note: Denver clinched the AFC West title instead of San Diego or Oakland based on common record (5–5 to San Diego's and Oakland's 4–6).) | Denver Broncos | West | 8 | 8 | 0 | .500 | 3–3 | 6–6 | .520 | .445 | L3 |
**Wild cards**
| 5 | Pittsburgh Steelers | North | 12 | 4 | 0 | .750 | 4–2 | 9–3 | .492 | .411 | W2 |
| 6 (Note: Cincinnati clinched the AFC 6 seed instead of Tennessee based on a head-to-head victory.) | Cincinnati Bengals | North | 9 | 7 | 0 | .563 | 2–4 | 6–6 | .492 | .326 | L1 |
**Did not qualify for the postseason**
| 7 | Tennessee Titans | South | 9 | 7 | 0 | .563 | 3–3 | 7–5 | .461 | .396 | W2 |
| 8 (Note: New York Jets finished ahead of San Diego based on head-to-head victory.) | New York Jets | East | 8 | 8 | 0 | .500 | 3–3 | 6–6 | .500 | .395 | L3 |
| 9 (Note: San Diego finished ahead of Oakland in the AFC West based on conference record (7–5 to 6–6).) | San Diego Chargers | West | 8 | 8 | 0 | .500 | 3–3 | 7–5 | .516 | .430 | W1 |
| 10 | Oakland Raiders | West | 8 | 8 | 0 | .500 | 3–3 | 6–6 | .504 | .438 | L1 |
| 11 | Kansas City Chiefs | West | 7 | 9 | 0 | .438 | 3–3 | 4–8 | .512 | .464 | W1 |
| 12 (Note: Miami finished ahead of Buffalo based on head-to-head sweep.) | Miami Dolphins | East | 6 | 10 | 0 | .375 | 3–3 | 5–7 | .504 | .417 | W1 |
| 13 | Buffalo Bills | East | 6 | 10 | 0 | .375 | 1–5 | 4–8 | .520 | .510 | L1 |
| 14 | Jacksonville Jaguars | South | 5 | 11 | 0 | .313 | 3–3 | 4–8 | .500 | .363 | W1 |
| 15 | Cleveland Browns | North | 4 | 12 | 0 | .250 | 0–6 | 3–9 | .531 | .313 | L6 |
| 16 | Indianapolis Colts | South | 2 | 14 | 0 | .125 | 2–4 | 2–10 | .539 | .594 | L1 |
**Tiebreakers** (Note: When breaking ties for three or more teams under the NFL's rules, they are first broken within divisions, then comparing only the highest ranked remaining team from each division.)

=== Statistics ===
==== Team leaders ====
| Category | Player(s) | Value |
|---|---|---|
| Passing yards | Tim Tebow | 1,729 |
| Passing touchdowns | Tim Tebow | 12 |
| Rushing yards | Willis McGahee | 1,199 |
| Rushing touchdowns | Tim Tebow | 6 |
| Receptions | Eric Decker | 44 |
| Receiving yards | Eric Decker | 612 |
| Receiving touchdowns | Eric Decker | 8 |
| Points | Matt Prater | 87 |
| Kickoff return yards | Quan Cosby | 457 |
| Punt return yards | Quan Cosby | 269 |
| Tackles | Wesley Woodyard | 97 |
| Sacks | Von Miller | 11.5 |
| Forced fumbles | D. J. Williams; Wesley Woodyard | 3 |
| Interceptions | André Goodman; Champ Bailey | 2 |

Source for this section: Denver Broncos' official website.

==== League rankings ====
Offense
| Category | Value | NFL rank (out of 32) |
|---|---|---|
| Total yards | 316.6 YPG | 23rd |
| Yards per play | 5 | 25th |
| Rushing yards | 164.5 YPG | 1st |
| Yards per rush | 4.8 | 6th |
| Passing yards | 152.1 YPG | 31st |
| Yards per pass | 6.3 | 28th |
| Scoring | 19.3 PPG | 25th |
| Pass completions | 217/429 (.506) | 32nd |
| Third downs | 66/214 (.308) | 30th |
| Possession average | 29:43 | 21st |
| Fewest sacks allowed | 42 | T−23rd |
| Turnover differential | −12 | 26th |

Defense
| Category | Value | NFL rank (out of 32) |
|---|---|---|
| Total yards | 357.8 YPG | 20th |
| Yards per play | 5.4 | 16th |
| Rushing yards | 126.3 YPG | 22nd |
| Yards per rush | 4.1 | 12th |
| Passing yards | 231.5 YPG | 15th |
| Yards per pass | 7.5 | 20th |
| Scoring | 24.4 PPG | 24th |
| Pass completions | 333/534 (.624) | 23rd |
| Third downs | 73/218 (.335) | 27th |
| Sacks | 41 | T−10th |
| Forced fumbles | 11 | T−26th |
| Fumble recoveries | 9 | T–18th |
| Interceptions | 9 | T−28th |

Special Teams
| Category | Value | NFL rank (out of 32) |
|---|---|---|
| Kickoff returns | 24.5 YPR | 11th |
| Punt returns | 12.7 YPR | 3rd |
| Gross punting | 47.4 YPP | 7th |
| Net punting | 41.6 YPP | 6th |
| Kickoff coverage | 24.6 YPR | 20th |
| Punt coverage | 11.5 YPR | 13th |

Source for this section: NFL.com.

== Postseason ==
=== Schedule ===
| Round | Date | Opponent | Result | Record | Venue | Recap |
|---|---|---|---|---|---|---|
| Wild Card | January 8, 2012 | Pittsburgh Steelers (5) | W 29–23 (OT) | 1–0 | Sports Authority Field at Mile High | Recap |
| Divisional | January 14, 2012 | at New England Patriots (1) | L 10–45 | 1–1 | Gillette Stadium | Recap |

=== Game summaries ===
==== AFC Wild Card Playoffs: vs. (5) Pittsburgh Steelers ====
AFC Wild Card Playoffs: (5) Pittsburgh Steelers at (4) Denver Broncos – Game summary

| Quarter | 1 | 2 | 3 | 4 | OT | Total |
|---|---|---|---|---|---|---|
| Steelers | 6 | 0 | 7 | 10 | 0 | 23 |
| Broncos | 0 | 20 | 0 | 3 | 6 | 29 |

at Sports Authority Field at Mile High, Denver, Colorado

- Date: January 8, 2012
- Game time: 2:30 p.m. MST
- Game weather: 40 °F (4 °C), sunny
- Game attendance: 75,970
- Referee: Ron Winter
- TV announcers (CBS): Jim Nantz and Phil Simms
- Gamebook

Game information

First quarter

- PIT – 11:14 Shaun Suisham 45-yard FG. Drive: 8 plays, 53 yards, 3:46. (PIT 3–0)
- PIT – 0:23 Shaun Suisham 38-yard FG. Drive: 12 plays, 47 yards, 5:50. (PIT 6–0)

Second quarter

- DEN – 13:24 Eddie Royal 30-yard TD pass from Tim Tebow, Matt Prater kick. Drive: 5 plays, 80 yards, 1:59. (DEN 7–6)
- DEN – 10:36 Tim Tebow 8-yard TD run, Matt Prater kick. Drive: 4 plays, 73 yards, 2:18. (DEN 14–6)
- DEN – 7:30 Matt Prater 20-yard FG. Drive: 4 plays, 16 yards, 1:44. (DEN 17–6)
- DEN – 1:05 Matt Prater 28-yard FG. Drive: 8 plays, 59 yards, 4:04. (DEN 20–6)

Third quarter

- PIT – 4:29 Mike Wallace 1-yard TD run, Shaun Suisham kick. Drive: 11 plays, 87 yards, 5:56. (DEN 20–13)

Fourth quarter

- DEN – 13:10 Matt Prater 35-yard FG. Drive: 12 plays, 63 yards, 6:19. (DEN 23–13)
- PIT – 9:59 Shaun Suisham 37-yard FG. Drive: 7 plays, 61 yards, 3:11. (DEN 23–16)
- PIT – 3:48 Jerricho Cotchery 31-yard TD pass from Ben Roethlisberger, Shaun Suisham kick. Drive: 7 plays, 55 yards, 3:47. (tied 23–23)

Overtime

- DEN – 14:49 Demaryius Thomas 80-yard TD pass from Tim Tebow. Drive: 1 play, 80 yards, 0:11. (DEN 29–23)

Top passers

- PIT – Ben Roethlisberger: 22/40, 289 yards, 1 TD, 1 INT
- DEN – Tim Tebow: 10/21, 316 yards, 2 TD

Top rushers

- PIT – Isaac Redman: 17 carries, 121 yards
- DEN – Willis McGahee: 19 carries, 61 yards

Top receivers

- PIT – Emmanuel Sanders: 6 receptions, 81 yards
- DEN – Demaryius Thomas: 4 receptions, 204 yards, 1 TD

Top tacklers

- PIT – Ike Taylor: 6 tackles, 1 assist
- DEN – David Bruton: 8 tackles

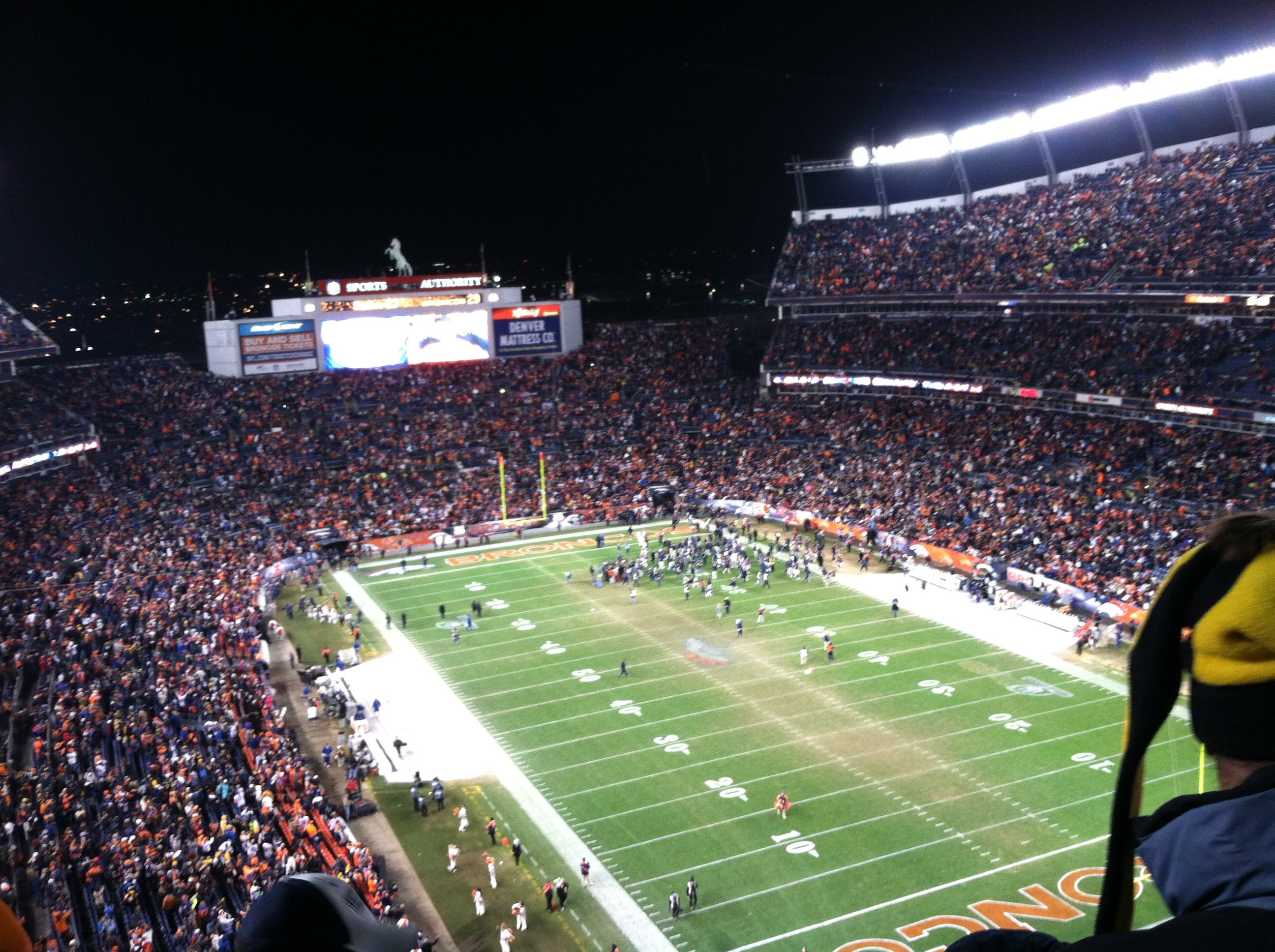
Sports Authority Field shortly after the game winning touchdown in overtime.

The Broncos opened the 2011–12 NFL Playoffs at home with a Wild Card matchup against the #5 seed Pittsburgh Steelers, the Broncos' first playoff game since 2005. The only points of the first quarter came from the Steelers, with field goals of 45 and 38 yards by placekicker Shaun Suisham. The Broncos reeled off 20 unanswered points in the second quarter, with quarterback Tim Tebow throwing a 30-yard touchdown pass to wide receiver Eddie Royal, then scrambling for an 8-yard touchdown run, followed by field goals of 20 and 28 yards by placekicker Matt Prater. A 1-yard touchdown run by Steelers' wide receiver Mike Wallace on an end-around was the only scoring play of the third quarter. The Broncos added to their lead early in the fourth quarter, with a 35-yard field goal by Prater. The Steelers countered with a 37-yard field goal by Suisham. On the Broncos' following possession, running back Willis McGahee fumbled, and the Steelers subsequently tied the game with a 7-play, 55-yard drive, culminating with a 31-yard touchdown pass from quarterback Ben Roethlisberger to wide receiver Jerricho Cotchery. Each team traded punts on subsequent possessions, sending the game to overtime. The Broncos won the overtime coin toss, and on their first play, Tebow fired the game-winning 80-yard touchdown pass to wide receiver Demaryius Thomas. It was not only the longest scoring play in NFL overtime playoff history, but Thomas also set a new Broncos' franchise record for receiving yards in a playoff game, with 204 yards.

==== AFC Divisional Playoffs: at (1) New England Patriots ====
AFC Divisional Playoffs: (4) Denver Broncos at (1) New England Patriots – Game summary

| Quarter | 1 | 2 | 3 | 4 | Total |
|---|---|---|---|---|---|
| Broncos | 0 | 7 | 3 | 0 | 10 |
| Patriots | 14 | 21 | 7 | 3 | 45 |

at Gillette Stadium, Foxborough, Massachusetts

- Date: January 14, 2012
- Game time: 8:00 p.m. EST/6:00 pm. MST
- Game weather: 24 °F (−4 °C), partly cloudy and cold
- Game attendance: 68,756
- Referee: Gene Steratore
- TV announcers (CBS): Jim Nantz, Phil Simms and Steve Tasker
- Recap, Gamebook

Game information

First quarter

- NE – 13:14 Wes Welker 7-yard TD pass from Tom Brady, Stephen Gostkowski kick. Drive: 5 plays, 80 yards, 1:51. (NE 7–0)
- NE – 7:17 Rob Gronkowski 10-yard TD pass from Tom Brady, Stephen Gostkowski kick. Drive: 7 plays, 59 yards, 3:25. (NE 14–0)

Second quarter

- DEN – 15:00 Willis McGahee 5-yard TD run, Matt Prater kick. Drive: 4 plays, 24 yards, 2:06. (NE 14–7)
- NE – 7:49 Rob Gronkowski 12-yard TD pass from Tom Brady, Stephen Gostkowski kick. Drive: 8 plays, 52 yards, 3:35. (NE 21–7)
- NE – 2:06 Deion Branch 61-yard TD pass from Tom Brady, Stephen Gostkowski kick. Drive: 2 plays, 72 yards, 0:30. (NE 28–7)
- NE – 0:10 Rob Gronkowski 19-yard TD pass from Tom Brady, Stephen Gostkowski kick. Drive: 5 plays, 58 yards, 1:04. (NE 35–7)

Third quarter

- NE – 11:53 Aaron Hernandez 17-yard TD pass from Tom Brady, Stephen Gostkowski kick. Drive: 4 plays, 44 yards, 1:40. (NE 42–7)
- DEN – 2:19 Matt Prater 41-yard FG. Drive: 14 plays, 58 yards, 6:16. (NE 42–10)

Fourth quarter

- NE – 12:44 Stephen Gostkowski 20-yard FG. Drive: 11 plays, 78 yards, 4:35. (NE 45–10)

Top passers

- DEN – Tim Tebow: 9/26, 136 yards
- NE – Tom Brady: 26/34, 363 yards, 6 TD, 1 INT

Top rushers

- DEN – Willis McGahee: 17 rushes, 76 yards, 1 TD
- NE – Aaron Hernandez: 5 rushes, 61 yards

Top receivers

- DEN – Demaryius Thomas: 6 receptions, 93 yards
- NE – Rob Gronkowski: 10 receptions, 145 yards, 3 TD

Top tacklers

- DEN – Ryan McBean and Joe Mays: 4 tackles each (5 assists by Mays, 1 assist by McBean)
- NE – Kyle Arrington: 6 tackles, 4 assists

Following their overtime win over the Steelers in the wild-card round of the 2011–12 NFL Playoffs, the Broncos traveled to Foxborough, Massachusetts to face the #1 seed New England Patriots at Gillette Stadium, in the divisional round. The Patriots jumped out to a 14–0 lead in the first quarter, with quarterback Tom Brady throwing a pair of touchdown passes—a 7-yarder to wide receiver Wes Welker and a 10-yarder to tight end Rob Gronkowski. The Broncos responded at the beginning of the second quarter, with running back Willis McGahee rushing for a 5-yard touchdown, but the Patriots subsequently added to lead, with Brady throwing three more touchdown passes—a 12-yarder to Gronkowski, a 61-yarder to wide receiver Deion Branch followed by a 19-yarder to Gronkowski just before halftime. The Patriots continued their onslaught in the third quarter, with a 17-yard touchdown pass to tight end Aaron Hernandez. A 41-yard field goal by Broncos' placekicker Matt Prater made the score 42–10. The Patriots added to their lead early in the fourth quarter, with a 20-yard field goal by placekicker Stephen Gostkowski, which was the last scoring play of the game by either team, sealing the win for New England. This would be the Broncos last playoff loss to the Patriots until 2025.

== Awards and honors ==
| Recipient | Award(s) |
|---|---|
| Champ Bailey | Named to the AFC Pro Bowl roster |
| Ryan Clady | Named to the AFC Pro Bowl roster |
| Brian Dawkins | Named to the AFC Pro Bowl roster |
| Eric Decker | Named to the USA Football All Fundamentals Team |
| Elvis Dumervil | Named to the AFC Pro Bowl roster |
| Orlando Franklin | Named to the Football Outsiders All-Rookie Team |
| Chris Harris, Jr. | Named to the Football Outsiders All-Rookie Team; Named to the Pro Football Weekly and the Pro Football Writers Association All-Rookie Team |
| Willis McGahee | Week 9: FedEx Ground Player of the Week; Named to the AFC Pro Bowl roster |
| Von Miller | First half of the season: Sports Illustrated Defensive Rookie of the Year. Week 10: AFC Defensive Player of the Week; November: Defensive Rookie of the Month; Named to the AFC Pro Bowl roster Named to the Football Outsiders All-Rookie Team; Voted to The Associated Press 2011 NFL All-Pro Team; Named to the Pro Football Weekly and the Pro Football Writers Association All-Rookie Team; 2011 season: Associated Press NFL Defensive Rookie of the Year |
| Matt Prater | Week 14: AFC Special Teams Player of the Week; December: AFC Special Teams Player of the Month |
| Eddie Royal | Week 9: AFC Special Teams Player of the Week |
| Tim Tebow | Week 14: GMC Never Say Never Moment of the Year (come-from-behind/overtime win) |
| Demaryius Thomas | Best Moment at 2012 ESPY Awards (80-yard touchdown pass from Tim Tebow in the Wild Card playoffs) |
| Wesley Woodyard | Named as the team's Walter Payton Man of the Year |
| Team | Week 7: GMC Never Say Never Moment of the Week (come-from-behind/overtime win); Week 10: GMC Never Say Never Moment of the Week (touchdown pass from Tim Tebow to Eric Decker); Week 11: GMC Never Say Never Moment of the Week (come-from-behind win), Week 12: GMC Never Say Never Moment of the Week (come-from-behind/overtime win); Week 14: GMC Never Say Never Moment of the Week (come-from-behind/overtime win) |

== Other news and notes ==
- On August 16, Sports Authority, a sporting goods retailer based in Englewood, Colorado, took over the naming rights of INVESCO Field at Mile High. Invesco held the original naming rights to the Denver Broncos' stadium since it opened in 2001, and Invesco's naming rights agreement was set to expire in 2021. INVESCO Field at Mile High officially became known as Sports Authority Field at Mile High, in time for the Broncos' first preseason game against the Buffalo Bills on August 20.
- This season was the last in which the Broncos wore their navy blue jerseys as their primary home jersey. The team used the alternate orange jerseys for games in Weeks 1 (vs. the Oakland Raiders) and 8 (vs. the Detroit Lions). Beginning with the 2012 season, the Broncos announced that the orange jerseys – the team's alternate colored jersey since 2002 – will become the primary home jersey, while the navy blue jerseys, which had been the team's primary home jersey since their introduction in 1997, will switch to alternate designation. The change was made due to overwhelming popularity with fans, who clamored for the team to return to wearing orange at home, which was the team's predominant home jersey color from 1962 to 1996.
