= Matt Willis (American football) =

American football player (born 1984)

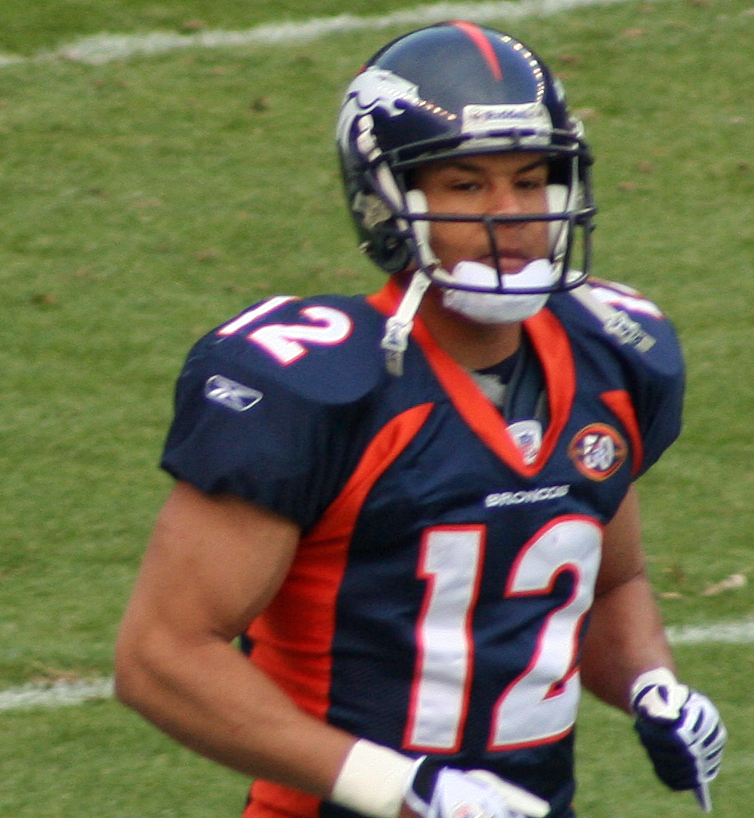
- Willis with the Denver Broncos in 2010

No. 17, 12
- Position: Wide receiver

Personal information
- Born: April 13, 1984 (age 42); Dallas, Texas, U.S.
- Listed height: 6 ft 0 in (1.83 m)
- Listed weight: 195 lb (88 kg)

Career information
- High school: Servite (Anaheim, California)
- College: UCLA
- NFL draft: 2007: undrafted

Career history
- Baltimore Ravens (2007–2008); Denver Broncos (2008–2012); Detroit Lions (2013)*
- * Offseason or practice squad member only

Career NFL statistics
- Receptions: 30
- Receiving yards: 385
- Receiving average: 12.8
- Receiving touchdowns: 1
- Stats at Pro Football Reference

Matthew Willis (born April 13, 1984) is an American former professional football player who was a wide receiver in the National Football League (NFL). He played college football for the UCLA Bruins and was signed by the Baltimore Ravens as an undrafted free agent in 2007.

== Early life ==
Willis attended Servite High School in California.

== College career ==
Willis played college football at the University of California, Los Angeles. He made 21 appearances for the Bruins with 24 receptions for 248 yards and three touchdowns. He majored in sociology.

== Professional career ==
=== Baltimore Ravens ===
Willis was signed by the Baltimore Ravens as an undrafted rookie free agent on May 4, 2007. In his rookie year, he played in five games making one reception for 11 yards, he also spent some time on defense making one tackle. He was released from the team's practice squad on September 17, 2008 to make room for defensive tackle J'Vonne Parker.

=== Denver Broncos ===
Willis was signed to the practice squad of the Denver Broncos on December 23, 2008 and remained there through the end of the season.

The following year, Willis was waived during final cuts on September 5 and re-signed to the team's practice squad. He was promoted to the active roster on January 1, 2010 after offensive tackle Herb Taylor was waived.

On October 17, 2010, in a game against the New York Jets, Willis suffered a broken foot, and was placed on the season-ending Injured Reserve.

Following the 2011 season, Willis became a restricted free agent, but was re-signed on April 16, 2012.

=== Detroit Lions ===
He was signed by the Detroit Lions on June 4, 2013, following the release of WR Lance Long. He was released by the Lions on August 31, 2013.

== Other activities ==
Shortly after the NFL lockout, Willis participated as a contestant on G4's American Ninja Warrior. Willis succeeded in the first round competition but was too slow in completing it and was eliminated before he could go to the semi-finals.
