= Marcus Thomas (defensive tackle) =

American football player (born 1985)

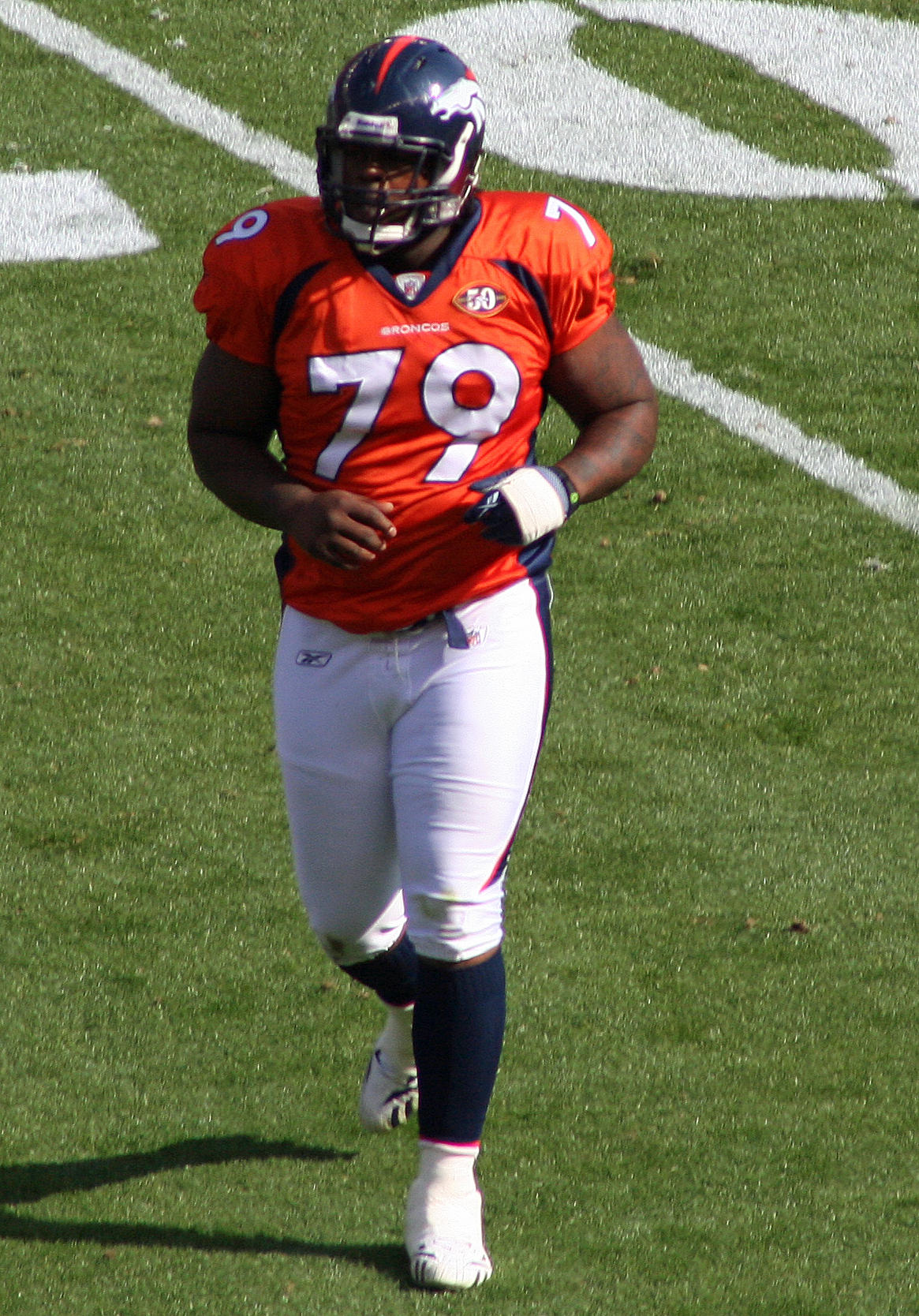
- Thomas with the Denver Broncos in 2009

No. 79
- Position: Nose tackle

Personal information
- Born: September 23, 1985 (age 41); Yokosuka, Japan
- Listed height: 6 ft 3 in (1.91 m)
- Listed weight: 314 lb (142 kg)

Career information
- High school: Mandarin (Jacksonville, Florida)
- College: Florida
- NFL draft: 2007: 4th round, 121st overall pick

Career history
- Denver Broncos (2007–2011); New York Giants (2012)*; Toronto Argonauts (2013–2014)
- * Offseason or practice squad member only

Awards and highlights
- BCS national champion (2007)

Career NFL statistics
- Total tackles: 147
- Sacks: 1
- Forced fumbles: 1
- Fumble recoveries: 1
- Interceptions: 2
- Stats at Pro Football Reference

Marcus Thomas (born September 23, 1985) is an American former professional football player who was a defensive tackle in the National Football League (NFL). Thomas played college football for the Florida Gators.

== Early life ==
Thomas was born in Yokosuka, Japan. He attended Mandarin High School in Jacksonville, Florida, where he was an all-state high school football player for the Mandarin Mustangs.

== College career ==
Thomas accepted an athletic scholarship to attend the University of Florida in Gainesville, Florida, where he played for coach Urban Meyer's Gators teams from 2003 to 2006. In November 2006, he was kicked off the team for violating the terms of his reinstatement from a drug-related suspension. He missed curfew, went on an unapproved out of town trip, and skipped a mandatory drug counseling session. Thomas was an anthropology major.

== Professional career ==
=== Denver Broncos ===
Thomas was picked in the fourth round with the 121st overall pick in the 2007 NFL draft by the Denver Broncos. On July 11, Thomas signed a 4-year contract with the club worth a reported $3 million.

=== New York Giants ===
On August 16, 2012, Thomas signed a one-year deal with the New York Giants. On August 31, 2012, Thomas was released by the New York Giants.

=== Toronto Argonauts ===
On October 16, 2013, Thomas was signed by the Toronto Argonauts of the Canadian Football League to a practice roster agreement. He dressed in two games, both starts, in 2013. The next season, he dressed in three games, starting one. On February 10, 2015, Thomas became a free agent.

== NFL career statistics ==
Legend
**Bold**	Career high

=== Regular season ===
Year	Team	Games		Tackles					Interceptions					Fumbles			
Year	Team	GP	GS	Cmb	Solo	Ast	Sck	TFL	Int	Yds	TD	Lng	PD	FF	FR	Yds	TD
2007	DEN	**16**	5	20	14	6	0.0	0	**1**	-2	0	-2	**1**	**1**	**1**	0	0
2008	DEN	**16**	**16**	34	23	11	0.0	0	**1**	**11**	0	**11**	**1**	0	0	0	0
2009	DEN	**16**	0	15	9	6	0.0	1	0	0	0	0	0	0	0	0	0
2010	DEN	**16**	2	35	**29**	6	**1.0**	3	0	0	0	0	**1**	0	0	0	0
2011	DEN	12	11	**43**	**29**	**14**	0.0	**5**	0	0	0	0	**1**	0	0	0	0
Career		76	34	147	104	43	1.0	9	2	9	0	11	4	1	1	0	0

=== Playoffs ===
Year	Team	Games		Tackles					Interceptions					Fumbles			
Year	Team	GP	GS	Cmb	Solo	Ast	Sck	TFL	Int	Yds	TD	Lng	PD	FF	FR	Yds	TD
2011	DEN	**2**	**2**	**5**	**3**	**2**	0.0	0	0	0	0	0	0	0	**1**	0	0
Career		2	2	5	3	2	0.0	0	0	0	0	0	0	0	1	0	0

== See also ==
- List of Florida Gators in the NFL draft
