= Kevin Vickerson =

American football player (born 1983)

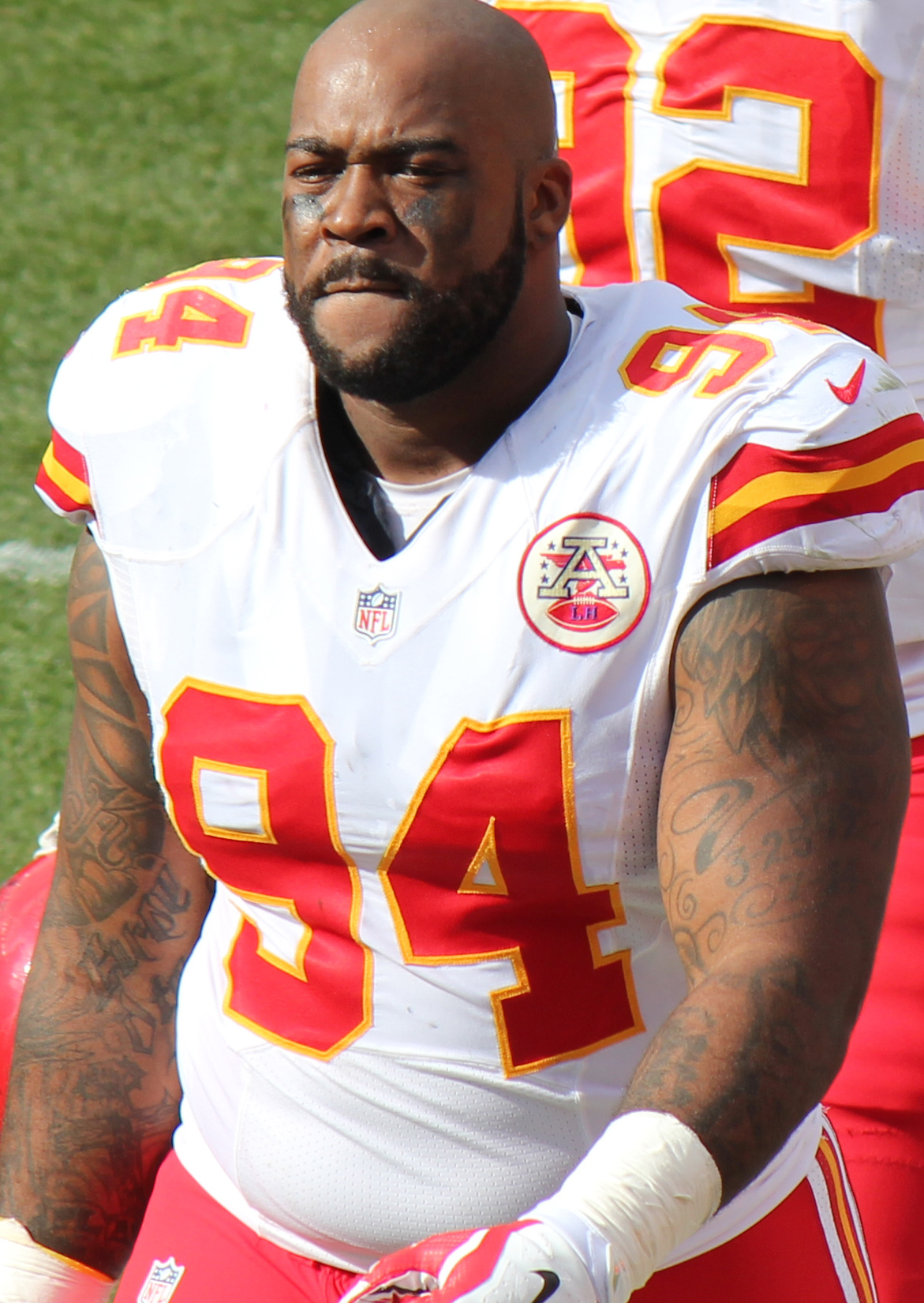
- Vickerson with the Kansas City Chiefs in 2014

Michigan State Spartans
- Title: Graduate assistant

Personal information
- Born: January 8, 1983 (age 43); Detroit, Michigan, U.S.
- Listed height: 6 ft 5 in (1.96 m)
- Listed weight: 328 lb (149 kg)

Career information
- High school: Martin Luther King (Detroit)
- College: Michigan State
- NFL draft: 2005: 7th round, 216th overall pick

Career history

Playing
- Miami Dolphins (2005–2006); Cologne Centurions (2007); Tennessee Titans (2007–2009); Seattle Seahawks (2010)*; Denver Broncos (2010–2013); Kansas City Chiefs (2014); New York Jets (2015)
- * Offseason or practice squad member only

Coaching
- Michigan State (2021–present) Graduate assistant

Awards and highlights
- First-team All-NFL Europa (2007)

Career NFL statistics
- Total tackles: 166
- Sacks: 6.5
- Forced fumbles: 2
- Pass deflections: 12
- Interceptions: 1
- Stats at Pro Football Reference

Kevin Darnell Vickerson (born January 8, 1983) is an American former professional football player who was a defensive tackle in the National Football League (NFL). He was selected by the Miami Dolphins in the seventh round of the 2005 NFL draft. He played college football for the Michigan State Spartans.

Vickerson was also a member of the Tennessee Titans, Seattle Seahawks, Denver Broncos, Kansas City Chiefs, and New York Jets.

== Early life ==
Vickerson attended Martin Luther King High School in Detroit, Michigan. As a senior, he earned Prep All-America honors playing both offensive and defensive line while helping his team to a 10–1 record and a Public School League title.

== College career ==
A four-year letterman at Michigan State University, played in 44 games while starting 19 for the Spartans. He started two games as a freshman and started six the following year. As a senior, Vickerson started 11 contests and amassed 46 tackles and 4.5 sacks. In his career, Vickerson totaled 113 tackles including 24.5 for a loss, 8.5 sacks, a fumble recovery and a pair of blocked kicks. He majored in criminal justice.

== Professional career ==
=== Miami Dolphins ===
Vickerson was selected by former Miami Dolphins head coach Nick Saban with a seventh-round pick (216th overall) in the 2005 NFL draft. After being late for numerous team meetings the Dolphins considered pulling their contract offer from the table, however he was signed on July 24. After spending two days on the Active/Non-Football Injury list, Vickerson was cleared to practice.

After compiling five tackles and a sack in preseason, Vickerson appeared likely to make the team. However, he was placed on Injured Reserve after suffering an ACL injury in a preseason game against the Atlanta Falcons on September 1.

Vickerson was on the bubble to make the team in 2006 and was rumored to be a candidate for the trading block, but in the end did make the final roster. He was inactive for all 16 contests in 2006, and after two seasons had never appeared in a regular season game for the Dolphins.

Vickerson became an unrestricted free agent on March 2, 2007, after the Dolphins declined to offer him a contract as an exclusive rights free agent. He was re-signed by the team and allocated to NFL Europa on March 9. In 10 starts for the Cologne Centurions, Vickerson recorded 31 tackles, 3.5 sacks and two passes defensed. He was named to the 2007 All-NFL Europa team.

Despite Vickerson's strong performance in NFL Europa, he was released by the Dolphins on August 27.

=== Tennessee Titans ===
Vickerson had a workout with the San Francisco 49ers on September 6, 2007, but was not signed. On November 1, he was signed to the practice squad of the Tennessee Titans - the team with which his brother Quartez attended training camp.

On November 28, Vickerson was promoted from the practice squad to the active roster after defensive tackle Demetrin Veal was released. He made his NFL debut on December 2, recording two assisted tackles in the team's 28–20 win over the Houston Texans.

=== Seattle Seahawks ===
Vickerson was traded to the Seattle Seahawks with LenDale White a fourth (111) and fifth (185) round pick in the 2010 NFL draft for a fourth (104) and fifth (176) round pick in the 2010 NFL draft. Vickerson was released before the start of the regular season on September 5, 2010.

=== Denver Broncos ===
Vickerson was signed by the Denver Broncos on September 7, 2010. On November 16, 2012, Vickerson was fined $15,000 for horse-collar tackling Carolina Panthers quarterback Cam Newton in Week 10. Vickerson came under scrutiny in a highly anticipated Sunday Night Football game against the Indianapolis Colts with his three personal fouls and hit on Samson Satele, knocking Satele out of the game with a knee injury. The Broncos would go on to lose 39-33 for their first loss of the season after starting 6–0.

Vickerson was released by the Broncos on August 30, 2014.

=== Kansas City Chiefs ===
On September 9, 2014, Vickerson was signed by the Kansas City Chiefs.

=== New York Jets ===
Vickerson was signed by the New York Jets on March 24, 2015.

== NFL career statistics ==
Legend
**Bold**	Career high

=== Regular season ===
Year	Team	Games		Tackles					Interceptions					Fumbles			
Year	Team	GP	GS	Cmb	Solo	Ast	Sck	TFL	Int	Yds	TD	Lng	PD	FF	FR	Yds	TD
2007	TEN	4	0	3	1	2	0.0	0	0	0	0	0	0	0	0	0	0
2008	TEN	7	0	14	8	6	1.5	1	0	0	0	0	1	0	**1**	0	0
2009	TEN	13	2	28	20	8	0.0	1	0	0	0	0	**3**	0	0	0	0
2010	DEN	15	12	**43**	**33**	10	**2.0**	3	**1**	**4**	0	**4**	**3**	**1**	0	0	0
2011	DEN	5	4	4	3	1	0.0	0	0	0	0	0	0	0	0	0	0
2012	DEN	**16**	**14**	40	28	**12**	**2.0**	5	0	0	0	0	1	**1**	0	0	0
2013	DEN	11	11	22	18	4	1.0	**7**	0	0	0	0	**3**	0	0	0	0
2014	KC	15	1	12	9	3	0.0	4	0	0	0	0	1	0	0	0	0
		86	44	166	120	46	6.5	21	1	4	0	4	12	2	1	0	0

=== Playoffs ===
Year	Team	Games		Tackles					Interceptions					Fumbles			
Year	Team	GP	GS	Cmb	Solo	Ast	Sck	TFL	Int	Yds	TD	Lng	PD	FF	FR	Yds	TD
2007	TEN	**1**	0	0	0	0	0.0	0	0	0	0	0	0	0	0	0	0
2008	TEN	**1**	0	**4**	**4**	0	0.0	**1**	0	0	0	0	0	0	0	0	0
2012	DEN	**1**	**1**	**4**	2	**2**	0.0	0	0	0	0	0	0	0	0	0	0
		3	1	8	6	2	0.0	1	0	0	0	0	0	0	0	0	0

== Personal life ==
Kevin's brother, Quartez Vickerson, played football at Grand Valley State and helped his team to a Division II national championship in 2005. He played with the Berlin Thunder of NFL Europa in the spring of 2007, and attended 2007 training camp with the Tennessee Titans.
