= Jonathan Wilhite =

American football player (born 1984)

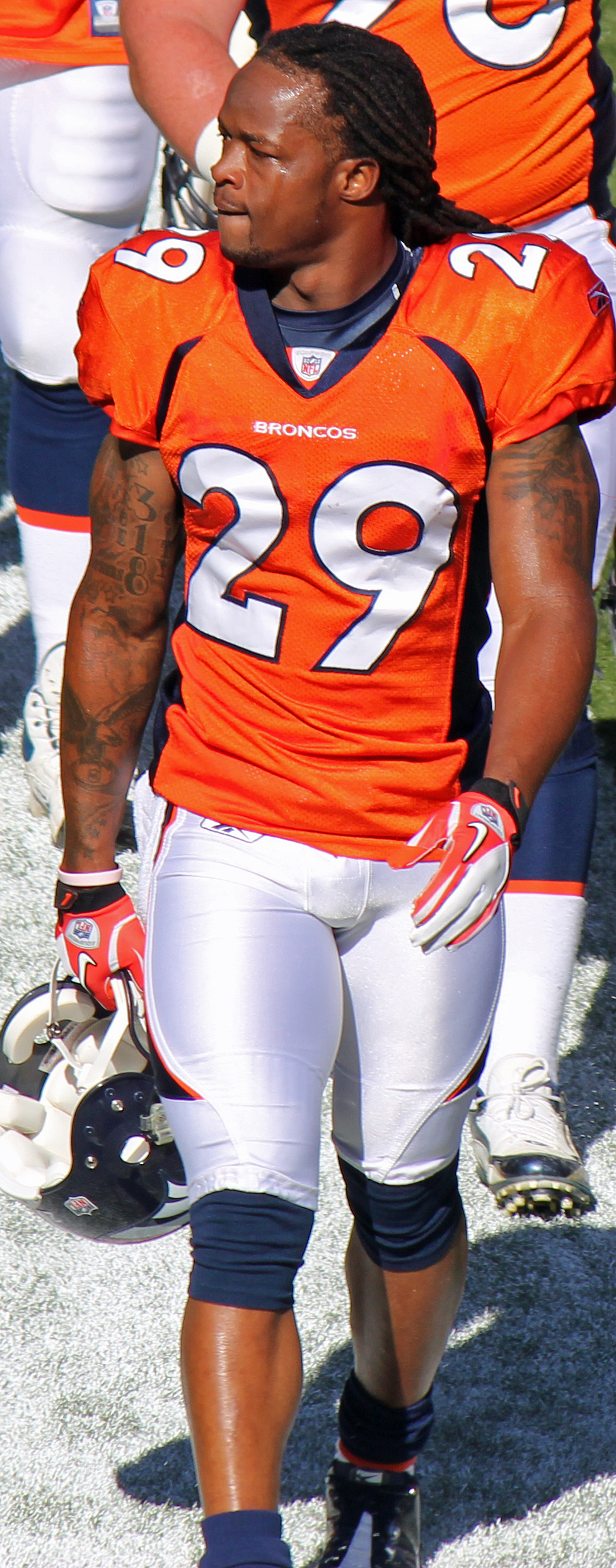
- Wilhite with the Denver Broncos in 2011

No. 24, 29
- Position: Cornerback

Personal information
- Born: February 23, 1984 (age 42); Monroe, Louisiana, U.S.
- Listed height: 5 ft 9 in (1.75 m)
- Listed weight: 183 lb (83 kg)

Career information
- High school: Ouachita Parish (LA)
- College: Butler Community College (2004); Auburn (2005–2007)
- NFL draft: 2008: 4th round, 129th overall pick

Career history
- New England Patriots (2008–2010); Denver Broncos (2011); Chicago Bears (2012)*
- * Offseason or practice squad member only

Awards and highlights
- NJCAA All-American (2004); First-team All-KJCCC (2004)

Career NFL statistics
- Total tackles: 123
- Sacks: 2
- Fumble recoveries: 1
- Interceptions: 4
- Stats at Pro Football Reference

Jonathan Wilhite (born February 23, 1984) is an American former professional football player who was a cornerback in the National Football League (NFL). He played college football for the Auburn Tigers and was selected by the New England Patriots in the fourth round of the 2008 NFL draft.

Wilhite was also a member of the Denver Broncos and Chicago Bears.

== Early life ==
Wilhite attended Ouachita Parish High School in Monroe, Louisiana, where he played football as a running back and receiver. He was named to the All-Northeast Louisiana team and was a second-team All-District selection.

== College career ==
=== Butler County CC ===
In 2004, Wilhite attended Butler County Community College and posted 44 tackles, seven pass deflections and five interceptions. He earned Earned National Junior College All-American team and All-Conference first-team and he was rated as the best Junior college cornerback in the country. Wilhite was also named first-team All-Kansas Jayhawk Community College Conference.

=== Auburn ===
==== 2005 ====
As a sophomore in 2005, Wilhite played in 12 games and started the last seven games. He was second on the team with seven pass deflections, five of which came in the last seven games of the season. Wilhite also had 47 tackles which made him fifth on Auburn's defense. Against Alabama he had five tackles and two pass deflections, against Georgia he had three tackles and a pass deflection. In the Capital One Bowl against Wisconsin he had five tackles. His best performance of the year came against Kentucky where he had seven tackles and one interception and was named SEC Defensive players of the week.

==== 2006 ====
In 2006, as a junior he started in 10 games and had 24 tackles. Against Alabama he had six tackles and then three against Georgia. Wilhite had two tackles against Arkansas State and three against Ole Miss. In the Cotton Bowl Classic, he did not play after he suffered an injury against LSU.

==== 2007 ====
As a senior in 2007, Wilhite started in six games: two at cornerback and four at nickel back. He had 30 tackles, a sack and a fumble recovery along with two interceptions and two pass deflections. During his college years, Wilhite became the team jokester, often impersonating coaches and teammates with dead-on accuracy. Auburn's Director of High School and NFL relations said of Wilhite's impersonations,

He’s very funny, and that keeps everybody loose. He could be a stand-up comedian. He can imitate everybody, including all the coaches on our staff. Most of them have heard his impressions of them, and they love it."

== Professional career ==
=== New England Patriots ===
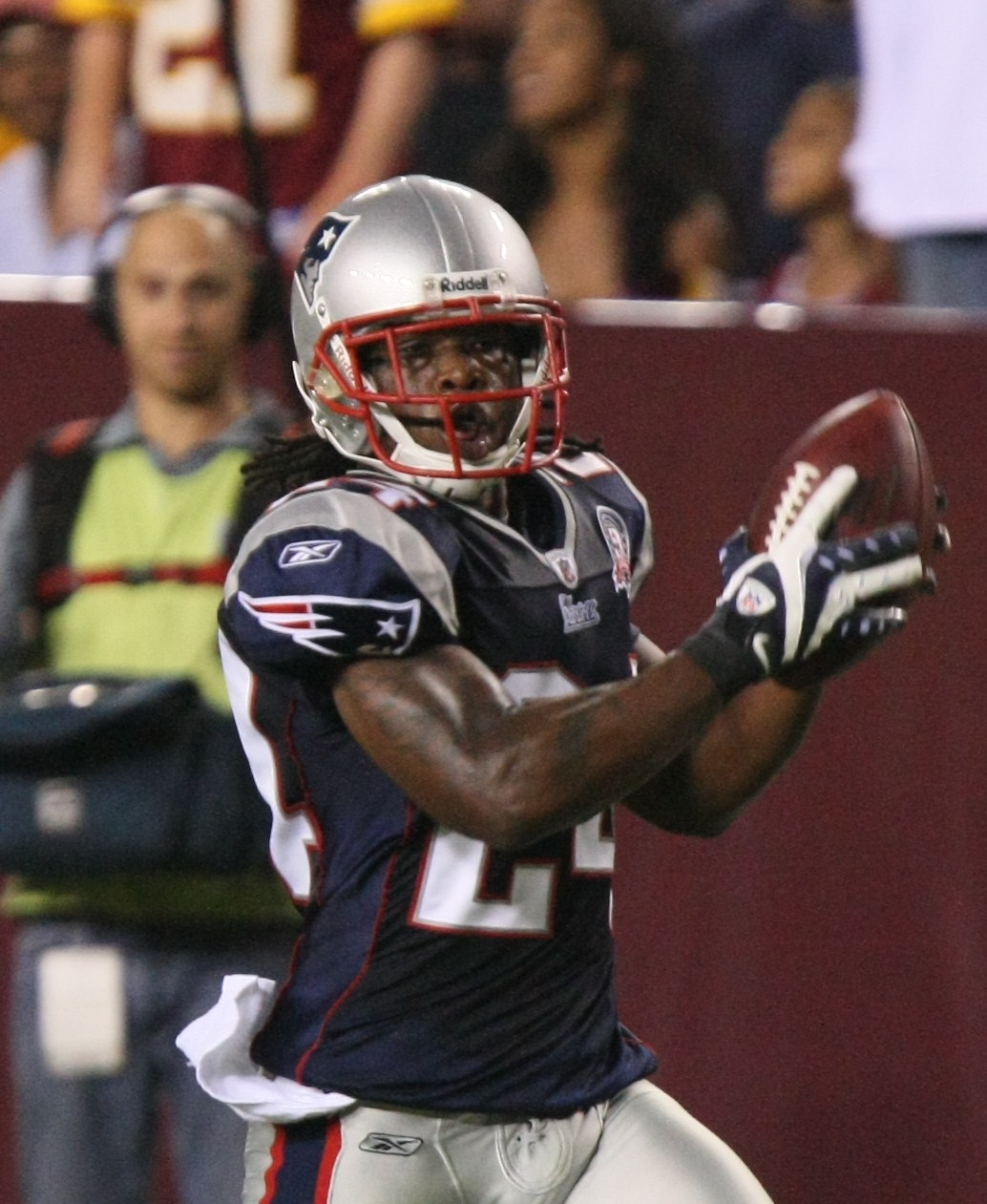
Wilhite during an August 28, 2009 preseason game against the Washington Redskins.

Wilhite was selected by the New England Patriots in the fourth round (129th overall) in the 2008 NFL draft. On July 17 he signed a contract with New England. He made his NFL debut on September 7, against Kansas City and had a season high six tackles against St. Louis on October 26. His first career interception came off of JaMarcus Russell of the Oakland Raiders on December 14. After spending most of the season behind cornerback Deltha O'Neal, Wilhite replaced O'Neal as a starter for the final four weeks of the 2008 season.

Wilhite played in 14 games for the Patriots in 2009, starting eight. He recorded two interceptions, 45 tackles, and five passes defensed. In 2010, Wilhite played in the first nine games of the season for the Patriots, starting one, before missing four games with a hip injury. He was placed on injured reserve on December 15, with a hamstring injury. He finished the season with 20 tackles and two passes defensed.

On August 29, 2011, he was waived.

=== Denver Broncos ===
Wilhite signed with the Denver Broncos on September 4, 2011.

=== Chicago Bears ===
Wilhite signed with the Chicago Bears on April 5, 2012. However, he was waived on August 31.

== NFL career statistics ==
Legend
**Bold**	Career high

=== Regular season ===
Year	Team	Games		Tackles					Interceptions					Fumbles			
Year	Team	GP	GS	Cmb	Solo	Ast	Sck	TFL	Int	Yds	TD	Lng	PD	FF	FR	Yds	TD
2008	NWE	**16**	4	28	24	4	0.0	0	1	16	0	16	2	0	0	0	0
2009	NWE	14	**8**	**45**	**37**	**8**	0.0	1	**2**	**17**	0	**17**	**5**	0	**1**	0	0
2010	NWE	9	1	20	16	4	0.0	0	0	0	0	0	2	0	0	0	0
2011	DEN	15	2	30	27	3	**2.0**	**2**	1	2	0	2	2	0	0	0	0
Career		54	15	123	104	19	2.0	3	4	35	0	17	11	0	1	0	0

=== Playoffs ===
Year	Team	Games		Tackles					Interceptions					Fumbles			
Year	Team	GP	GS	Cmb	Solo	Ast	Sck	TFL	Int	Yds	TD	Lng	PD	FF	FR	Yds	TD
2009	NWE	1	0	**4**	**3**	**1**	0.0	0	0	0	0	0	0	0	0	0	0
2011	DEN	**2**	0	0	0	0	0.0	0	0	0	0	0	0	0	0	0	0
Career		3	0	4	3	1	0.0	0	0	0	0	0	0	0	0	0	0

== Personal life ==
In 2011, during the lockout, Wilhite married Sheena Davis.
