= Herb Taylor (American football) =

American football player (born 1984)

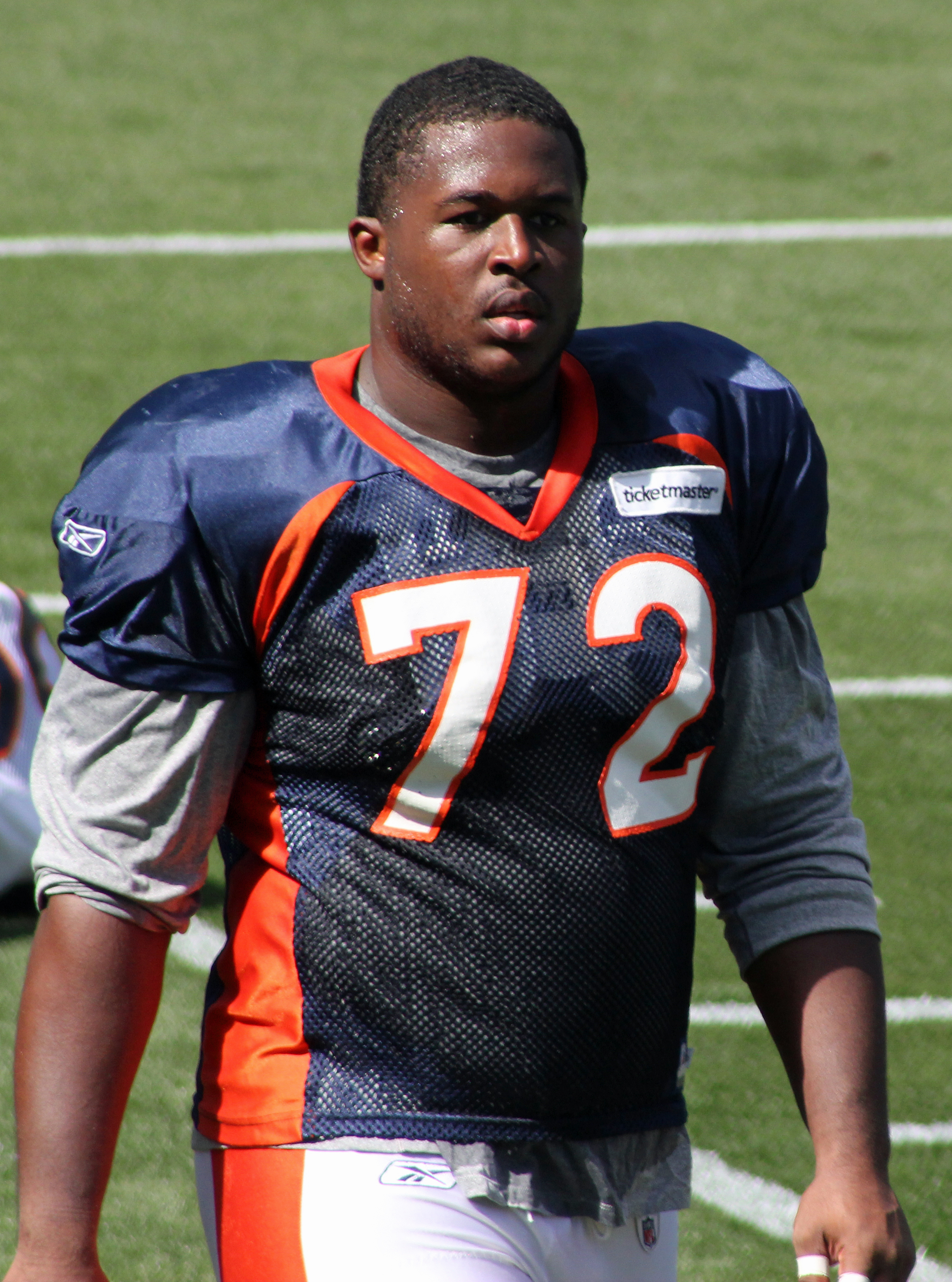
- Taylor with the Denver Broncos in 2011

No. 65, 75, 72, 76
- Position: Offensive tackle / Guard

Personal information
- Born: September 22, 1984 (age 42); Houston, Texas, U.S.
- Listed height: 6 ft 4 in (1.93 m)
- Listed weight: 282 lb (128 kg)

Career information
- High school: Hightower (Missouri City, Texas)
- College: Texas Christian
- NFL draft: 2007: 6th round, 196th overall pick

Career history
- Kansas City Chiefs (2007–2008); Denver Broncos (2009); New York Giants (2010)*; Las Vegas Locomotives (2010); Denver Broncos (2011)*; Green Bay Packers (2011); Jacksonville Jaguars (2012)
- * Offseason or practice squad member only

Awards and highlights
- UFL champion (2010); 2× First-team All-MW (2005, 2006)

Career NFL statistics
- Games played: 20
- Games started: 2
- Stats at Pro Football Reference

Herbert Reginald Taylor, II (born September 22, 1984) is an American former professional football player who was an offensive tackle in the National Football League (NFL). He was selected by the Kansas City Chiefs in the sixth round of the 2007 NFL draft. He played college football for the TCU Horned Frogs.

Taylor was also a member of the Denver Broncos, New York Giants, Las Vegas Locomotives, Green Bay Packers, and Jacksonville Jaguars.

== Early life ==
Taylor was a letterman in football, baseball and track at Hightower High School in the Houston area before playing college football at Texas Christian University (TCU) in Fort Worth.

== College career ==
At TCU, he started all 48 games of his college career, a school record.

== Professional career ==
=== Kansas City Chiefs ===
Taylor was selected by the Kansas City Chiefs in the sixth round, with the 196th overall pick, of the 2007 NFL draft. He officially signed with the team on July 25, 2007. He played in two games for the Chiefs in 2007. Taylor appeared in all 16 games, starting one, during the 2008 season. He was released by the Chiefs on September 4, 2009.

=== Denver Broncos (first stint) ===
Taylor was signed by the Denver Broncos on December 9, 2009, released on December 19, signed again on December 29, and released again on January 2, 2010.

=== New York Giants ===
Taylor signed with the New York Giants on February 8, 2010. He was released on September 4, 2010.

=== Las Vegas Locomotives ===
Taylor was signed by the Las Vegas Locomotives of the United Football League on November 1, 2010. He played in two games for the Locomotives during the 2010 season.

=== Denver Broncos (second stint) ===
Taylor signed with the Broncos on January 6, 2011. He was released on September 6, 2011.

=== Green Bay Packers ===
Taylor was signed by the Green Bay Packers on December 20, 2011. He was released on August 24, 2012.

=== Jacksonville Jaguars ===
Taylor was signed by the Jacksonville Jaguars of the National Football League on September 10, 2012. Six days later, he started at right guard against the Houston Texans due to an injury to Eben Britton. He played in two games, starting one, in 2012. Taylor was released on October 27, 2012.
