= List of Denver Broncos head coaches =

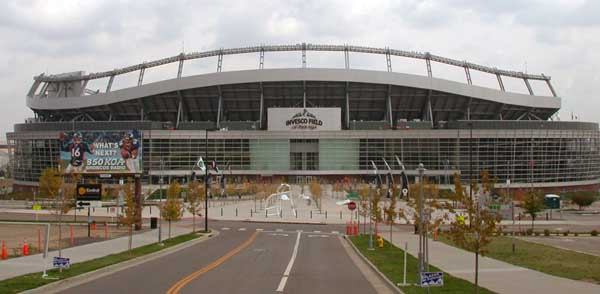
Empower Field at Mile High (formerly Invesco Field at Mile High) has been the home of the Broncos since 2001.

The Denver Broncos are a professional American football franchise based in Denver, Colorado. They are members of the West Division of the American Football Conference (AFC) in the National Football League (NFL). The team began playing in 1960 as a charter member of the American Football League (AFL), and joined the NFL as part of the AFL-NFL merger. The team has played their home games at Empower Field at Mile High since 2001.

There have been 20 head coaches for the Broncos franchise as of 2023. The franchise's first head coach was Frank Filchock, who coached until 1961. Mike Shanahan is the franchise's all-time leader for the most regular season games coached (208), the most regular season game wins (130), and the most playoff game wins (8). Shanahan and Dan Reeves, are tied for the most playoff games coached (13). Shanahan was the first Broncos head coach to win a Super Bowl following the 1997 season, and repeated the feat following the 1998 season. The Broncos next Super Bowl victory was for Super Bowl 50 following the 2015 season under the leadership of coach Gary Kubiak who had previously played for Denver and served as an assistant coach. Jack Faulkner, John Ralston, Red Miller, and Reeves have been named the United Press International (UPI) NFL Coach of the Year, at least once with the Broncos. Filchock, Faulkner, Mac Speedie, Jerry Smith, Ralston, and Miller spent their entire coaching careers with the Broncos. Speedie, Ray Malavasi, Miller, Shanahan, and Kubiak had been assistant coaches with the Broncos before they became head coaches with the Broncos. The most recent head coach of the Broncos was Sean Payton, who was hired on January 31, 2023.

== Key ==
#	Number of coaches (Note: A running total of the number of coaches of the Broncos. Thus, any coach who has two or more terms as head coach is only counted once.)
Yrs	Years coached
First	First season coached
Last	Last season coached
GC	Games Coached
W	Wins
L	Loses
T	Ties
Win%	Win – Loss percentage
*	Spent entire NFL head coaching career with the Broncos

== Head coaches ==
Note: Statistics are accurate through the end of the 2025 NFL season.

#	Image	Name	Term (Note: Each year is linked to an article about that particular NFL season.)		Regular season					Playoffs			Accomplishments	Ref.
#	Image	Name	First	Last	GC	W	L	T	Win%	GC	W	L	Accomplishments	Ref.
1		Frank Filchock*	1960	1961	28	7	20	1	.268	—				
2		Jack Faulkner*	1962	1964	32	9	22	1	.297	—			1962 UPI AFL Coach of the Year	
3		Mac Speedie*	1964	1966	26	6	19	1	.250	—				
4		Ray Malavasi	1966		12	4	8	0	.333	—				
5		Lou Saban	1967	1971	65	20	42	3	.325	—				
6		Jerry Smith*	1971		5	2	3	0	.400	—				
7		John Ralston*	1972	1976	70	34	33	3	.507	—			1973 UPI AFC NFL Coach of the Year	
8		Red Miller*	1977	1980	62	40	22	0	.645	5	2	3	1 AFC championship (1977); 1977 AP NFL Coach of the Year; 1977 Sporting News NFL Coach of the Year; 1977 Pro Football Weekly NFL Coach of the Year; 1977 UPI AFC NFL Coach of the Year	
9		Dan Reeves	1981	1992	184	110	73	1	.601	13	7	6	3 AFC championships (1986, 1987, 1989); 1984 Pro Football Weekly NFL Coach of the Year; 1989 UPI AFC NFL Coach of the Year; 1991 UPI AFC NFL Coach of the Year	
10		Wade Phillips	1993	1994	32	16	16	0	.500	1	0	1		
11		Mike Shanahan	1995	2008	224	138	86	0	.616	13	8	5	2 Super Bowl championships (1997, 1998)	
12		Josh McDaniels	2009	2010	28	11	17	0	.393	—				
13		Eric Studesville*	2010		4	1	3	0	.250	—				
14		John Fox	2011	2014	64	46	18	0	.719	7	3	4	1 AFC championship (2013)	
15		Gary Kubiak	2015	2016	32	21	11	0	.656	3	3	0	1 AFC championship (2015); 1 Super Bowl championship (2015)	
16		Vance Joseph*	2017	2018	32	11	21	0	.344	—				
17		Vic Fangio*	2019	2021	49	19	30	0	.388	—				
18		Nathaniel Hackett*	2022		15	4	11	0	.267	—				
19		Jerry Rosburg*	2022		2	1	1	0	.500	—				
20		Sean Payton	2023–present		51	32	19	0	.627	3	1	2		
