= Cassius Vaughn =

American football player (born 1987)

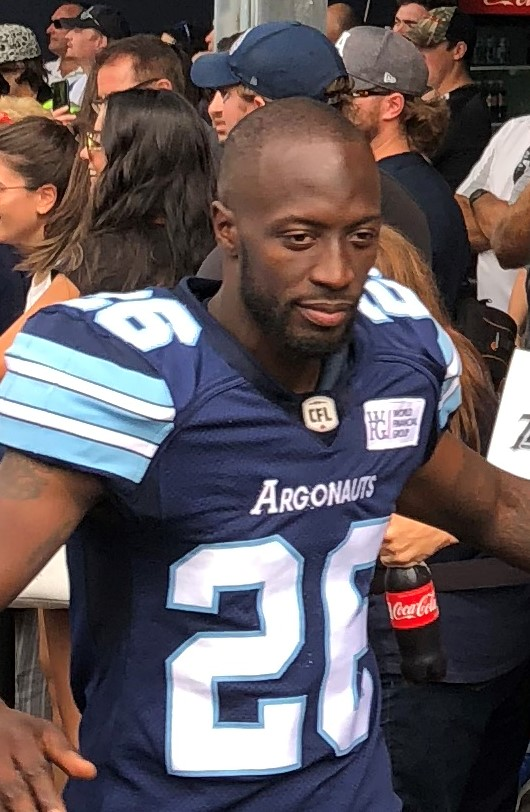
- Vaughn with the Toronto Argonauts in 2018

No. 26, 41, 32, 29, 40, 20
- Position: Cornerback

Personal information
- Born: November 3, 1987 (age 39); Memphis, Tennessee, U.S.
- Listed height: 5 ft 11 in (1.80 m)
- Listed weight: 198 lb (90 kg)

Career information
- High school: East (Memphis)
- College: Mississippi
- NFL draft: 2010: undrafted

Career history
- Denver Broncos (2010–2011); Indianapolis Colts (2012–2013); Detroit Lions (2014); Baltimore Ravens (2015); San Diego Chargers (2015); Hamilton Tiger-Cats (2016); Toronto Argonauts (2017–2018)

Awards and highlights
- Grey Cup champion (2017); CFL East All-Star (2017)

Career NFL statistics
- Total tackles: 146
- Forced fumbles: 1
- Fumble recoveries: 5
- Pass deflections: 25
- Interceptions: 7
- Total touchdowns: 3
- Stats at Pro Football Reference
- Stats at CFL.ca

Cassius M. Vaughn (born November 3, 1987) is an American former professional football player who was a defensive back in the National Football League (NFL) and Canadian Football League (CFL). He was signed by the Denver Broncos as an undrafted free agent in 2010. He played college football for the Ole Miss Rebels. Vaughn also played for the Indianapolis Colts, Detroit Lions, Baltimore Ravens and San Diego Chargers in the NFL. He made his CFL debut in 2016 with the Hamilton Tiger-Cats.

== Professional career ==
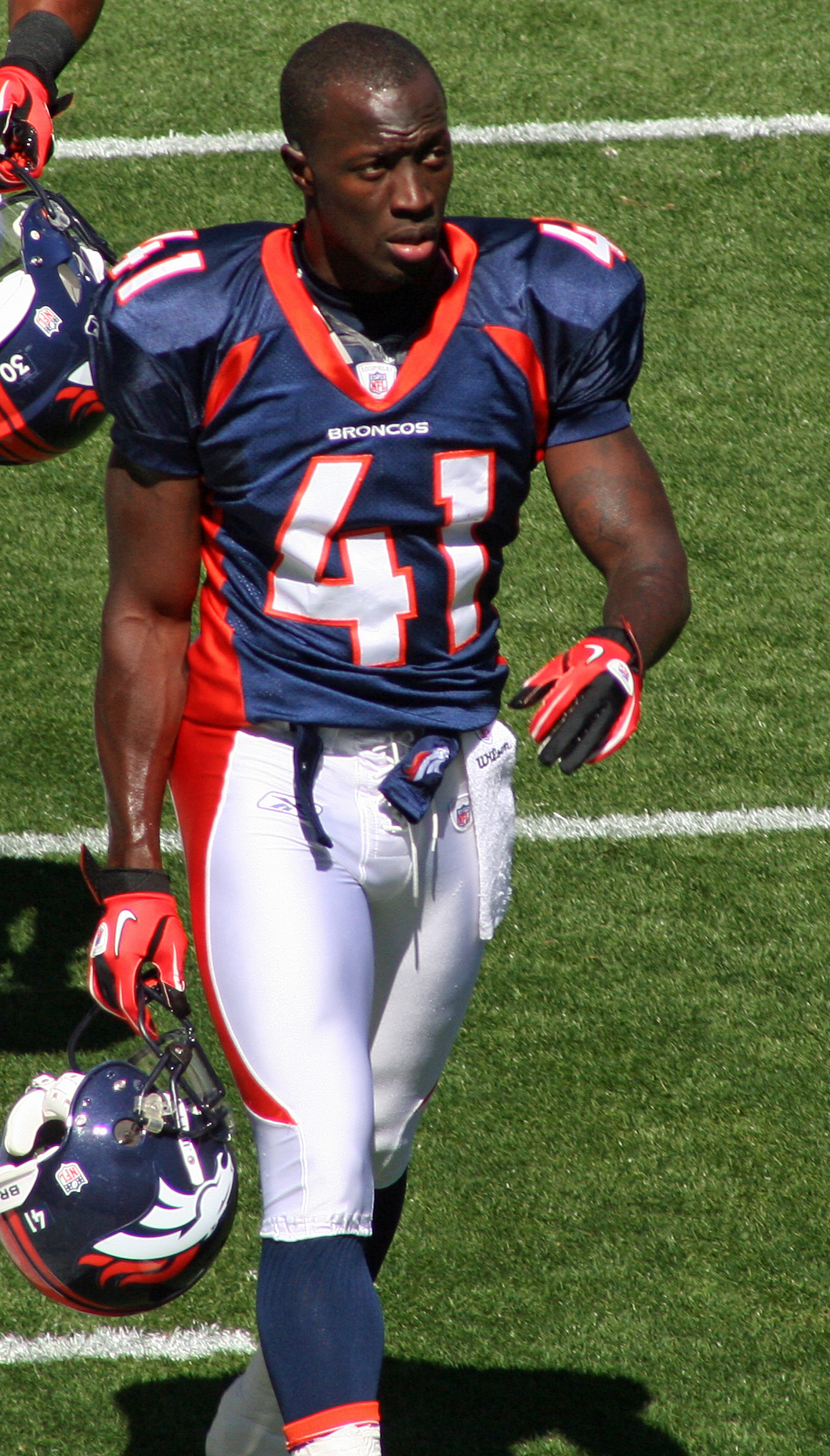
Vaughn with the Denver Broncos in 2010.

=== Denver Broncos ===
As a rookie in 2010 for the Denver Broncos (NFL), Vaughn did not start in any games as a defensive back but did play in thirteen games as a special teams player, where he recorded seven tackles, recovered a muffed punt, and returned two kickoffs for 125 yards and one touchdown. On October 9, 2011, in a 29–24 loss to the San Diego Chargers, Vaughn intercepted Philip Rivers' pass and returned it 55 yards for a touchdown.

=== Indianapolis Colts ===
On May 23, 2012, Vaughn was traded to the Indianapolis Colts (NFL) in exchange for FB Chris Gronkowski. On November 9, 2012, Vaughn was fined $7,875 for a late hit on Miami Dolphins running back Reggie Bush in Week 9.

=== Detroit Lions ===
On April 7, 2014, Vaughn signed a one-year contract with the Detroit Lions (NFL).

=== Baltimore Ravens ===
On May 28, 2015, Vaughn signed a one-year contract with the Baltimore Ravens (NFL). On September 5, 2015, he was released by the Ravens. He re-signed with the Ravens on November 17. He was released on December 8, 2015.

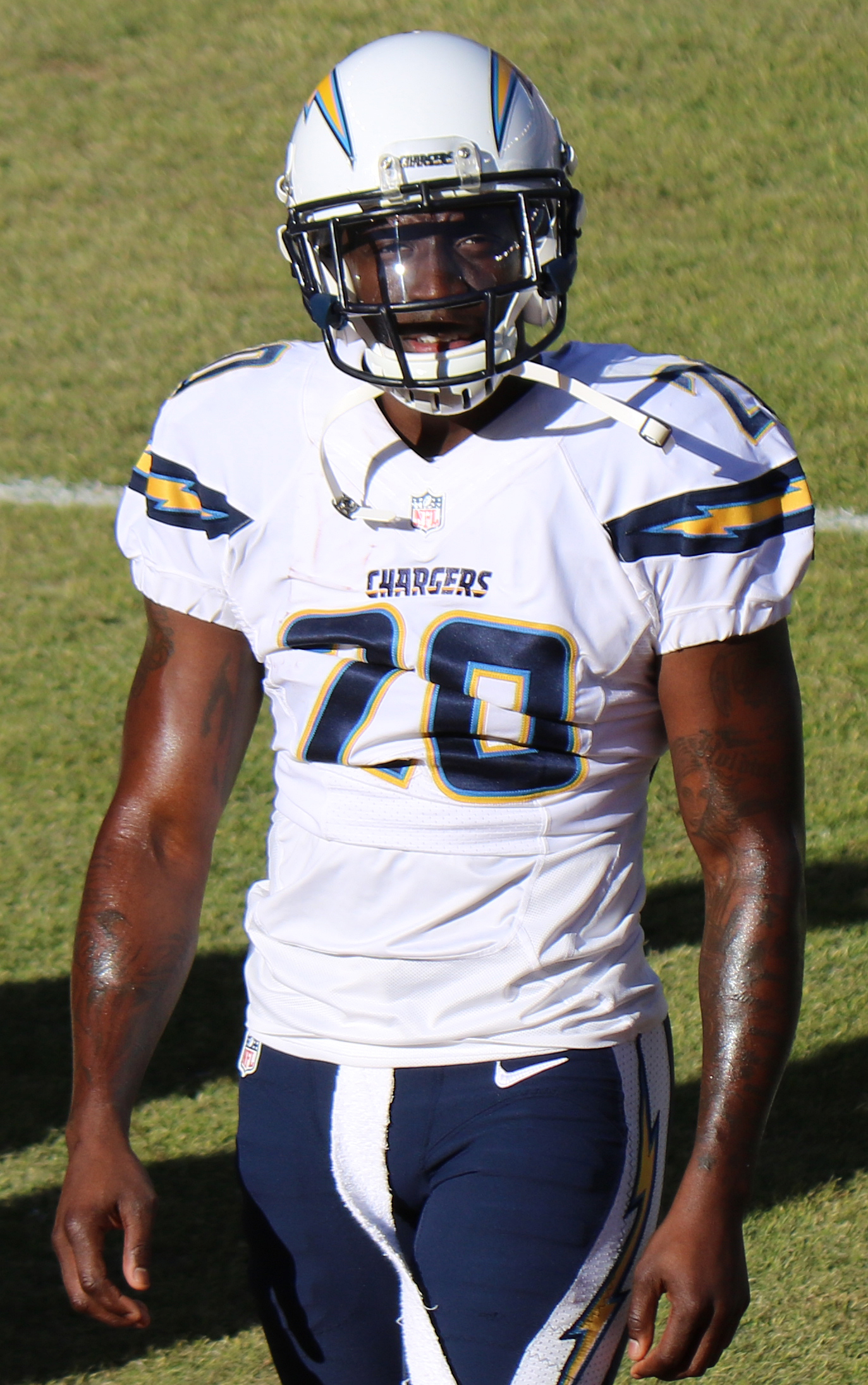
Vaughn with the San Diego Chargers.

=== San Diego Chargers ===
Vaughn signed with the San Diego Chargers (NFL) on December 30, 2015.

=== Hamilton Tiger-Cats ===
On August 17, 2016, it was announced that Vaughn signed as a free agent with the Hamilton Tiger-Cats of the CFL. In his first season in the CFL, Vaughn played in 9 regular season games, contributing 26 defensive tackles and 1 tackle on special teams, in addition to 5 kick returns for 130 yards. On May 16, 2017, it was announced that Vaughn along with five other players were released by the Tiger-Cats.

=== Toronto Argonauts ===
On May 17, 2017, it was announced that Vaughn had signed with the Toronto Argonauts (CFL). Although technically classified as a linebacker in the Toronto defensive scheme, Vaughn continues to provide coverage as a defensive back. Vaughn recorded his first CFL interception in a week 1 victory against his former team, picking off Zach Collaros of the Tiger-Cats. Vaughn also recovered a fumble to kick-start a week 3 comeback over the Ottawa Redblacks. Despite fumbling himself on the return, a fellow Argonaut recovered the ball in the endzone. During week 9, Vaughn secured a goal-line interception during a victory over the Montreal Alouettes which allowed the Argos to retake lead of the CFL East Division. The following week, the Argos lost to the Calgary Stampeders, 23–7, with Toronto's only points coming off of Vaughn's 3rd interception of the year, which he returned 115 yards for a touchdown. During a 40–13 victory in week 20 to clinch the Eastern Division championship, Vaughn recorded two interceptions, one on the final play of the first quarter, and the other on the final play of the second quarter. Vaughn finished the season with 32 tackles and 5 interceptions (which were returned for 209 yards and a score) during 16 games played, and was named a CFL East Division All Star. During the CFL East Championship against the crossover Saskatchewan Roughriders, Vaughn intercepted a Kevin Glenn pass deep in Roughriders territory to set up a field goal as a part of Toronto's 25–21 victory, to send the Argonauts to the 105th Grey Cup. In the CFL championship game held on November 26, Vaughn recovered a fumble and returned it a Grey Cup record 109 yards for a touchdown to help Toronto win the 2017 Grey Cup over the Calgary Stampeders. Vaughn signed a two-year extension with Toronto on February 12, 2018.

During 2018, Vaughn forced a fumble to create a short field and subsequent touchdown as part of Toronto's first victory in Week 4. During 8 games, Vaughn also recorded 24 tackles, but was ruled out for the rest of the season with an Achilles injury.

On February 25, 2019, Vaughn was released by the club.

== Personal life ==
Vaughn's grandfather, Chester Vaughn, was a Golden Glove boxer from Indiana, and was scheduled to fight Muhammad Ali when Ali was still known as Cassius Clay. Chester had to back out due to his wife's pregnancy but was impressed with Clay that he named his son Cassius, who did the same with his own son, the football player. Vaughn named his own son Cassius, and takes pride in the name, stating, "I'm privileged to part of it because the men who came before me are great men."

Following the exit by Hamilton from the 2016 CFL playoffs, Vaughn served as defensive backs coach for his former school, East High School in Memphis. The team won the 4A state title with Vaughn on the coaching staff.
