= 2010 Denver Broncos season =

American football team season

- Owner: Pat Bowlen
- General manager: Brian Xanders
- Head coach: Josh McDaniels (fired on December 6; 3–9 record); Eric Studesville (interim; 1–3 record)
- Home stadium: INVESCO Field at Mile High

Results
- Record: 4–12
- Division place: 4th AFC West
- Playoffs: Did not qualify
- All-Pros: WR Brandon Lloyd (2nd team)
- Pro Bowlers: WR Brandon Lloyd; CB Champ Bailey

The 2010 season was the Denver Broncos' 41st season in the National Football League (NFL), the 51st overall, the 10th playing their home games at INVESCO Field at Mile High and second and final under head coach Josh McDaniels. The off-season was marked by the draft selections of Georgia Tech wide receiver Demaryius Thomas and All-American Florida quarterback Tim Tebow, as well as season-ending injuries to All-Pro linebacker Elvis Dumervil and free agent running back LenDale White. The team failed to improve on its 8–8 record from 2009, and set a new franchise record for losses in a single season, with a 4–12 record, which was their worst record in the post-merger era, and worst in a 16-game schedule. In addition, this was the Broncos' fifth consecutive non-playoff season, which was second-longest such streak in franchise history at the time, behind 1960–1976. The regular season was marked by a videotaping scandal and the firing of head coach Josh McDaniels after 12 games. Running backs coach Eric Studesville served as interim head coach for the final four games.

The Broncos had the league's worst defense in 2010, allowing a league-worst 471 points (29.4 per game) and 6,253 yards. It would be the only season the Broncos lost 12 games for 12 years.

== Coaching changes ==
- On January 13, longtime offensive coordinator/line coach Rick Dennison was hired as the new offensive coordinator for the Houston Texans.
- On January 14, longtime running backs coach Bobby Turner was hired to the same position with the Washington Redskins, reuniting him with former Broncos' head coach Mike Shanahan.
- On January 18, the Broncos and defensive coordinator Mike Nolan decided to mutually part ways.
- On January 23, the following changes were made to the Broncos' coaching staff: Eric Studesville was hired as the new running backs coach. Bob Ligashesky was hired as the new tight ends coach, a position previously held by Clancy Barone, who was moved to offensive line coach. Bob Wylie was named the assistant offensive line coach. Ben McDaniels, younger brother of former head coach Josh McDaniels, became the quarterbacks coach, while Mike McCoy, who previously served as both quarterbacks coach and offensive coordinator, retained his position as offensive coordinator.
- On January 28, Don Martindale was promoted from linebackers coach to the defensive coordinator position that was previously vacated by Mike Nolan.
- On February 11, Craig Aukerman, who was previously a linebackers coach at Kent State University, was named the team's defensive assistant.
- On February 23, the coaching staff was finalized, when Brian Callahan was hired as a coaching assistant.

=== Firing of Josh McDaniels ===
On December 6, head coach Josh McDaniels was fired, one day after the team's 10–6 loss to the Kansas City Chiefs in Week 13. In addition to the team's sluggish performance (they had gone 5–17 since a 6–0 start to the 2009 season), the videotaping scandal was a factor in his ouster. According to The Denver Post, while Broncos' owner Pat Bowlen did not consider the incident something that merited firing McDaniels for cause, he and others in the Broncos' front office still felt his failure to report the incident was "unforgivable." Running backs coach Eric Studesville was named interim coach that same day.

== Roster changes ==
=== Free agents ===
| Position | Player | Tag | 2010 Team | Notes |
|---|---|---|---|---|
| S | Josh Barrett | ERFA | None | |
| P | Mitch Berger | UFA | None | |
| OLB | Elvis Dumervil | RFA | None | signed tender June 14, signed contract extension July 22, placed on injured reserve September 4 |
| S | Vernon Fox | UFA | None | |
| G | Brandon Gorin | UFA | None | |
| LB | Nick Greisen | UFA | Omaha Nighthawks (UFL) | signed April 29, waived August 12 |
| OT | Ben Hamilton | UFA | Seattle Seahawks | signed with the Seahawks on April 20 |
| C | Russ Hochstein | UFA | Denver Broncos | signed March 5 |
| DE | Vonnie Holliday | UFA | Washington Redskins | signed with the Redskins on May 17 |
| G | Chris Kuper | RFA | Denver Broncos | signed June 4 |
| CB | Ty Law | UFA | None | |
| WR | Brandon Lloyd | UFA | Denver Broncos | signed March 5 |
| WR | Brandon Marshall | RFA | Miami Dolphins | signed tender April 13, traded to the Dolphins on April 14 |
| QB | Kyle Orton | RFA | Denver Broncos | signed tender April 16, contract extension August 19 |
| PK | Matt Prater | ERFA | Denver Broncos | signed March 9, placed on injured reserve December 23 |
| TE | Tony Scheffler | RFA | Detroit Lions | signed tender April 14, traded to the Lions on April 20 |
| DE | Le Kevin Smith | RFA | Denver Broncos | signed March 11, released September 7, re-signed October 26, released November 9 |

=== Signings ===
| Position | Player | 2009 Team | Notes |
|---|---|---|---|
| RB | J. J. Arrington | Injured reserve | signed March 5, traded to the Philadelphia Eagles on July 31 |
| OLB | Baraka Atkins | San Francisco 49ers | signed January 13, waived September 5 |
| ILB | Akin Ayodele | Miami Dolphins | signed April 24, released August 24 |
| RB | Lance Ball | Practice squad player | moved to the active roster on November 10, on final roster |
| DT | Justin Bannan | Baltimore Ravens | signed March 5, on final roster |
| OT | Kirk Barton | Detroit Lions | signed July 7, waived August 23 |
| OLB | Diyral Briggs | San Francisco 49ers | moved to the active roster on October 19, waived October 25 |
| RB | Andre Brown | New York Giants | signed September 5, released September 15, assigned to the practice squad on September 17, moved to the active roster on September 21, released October 16 |
| G | Jeff Byers | Practice squad player | moved to the active roster on December 23, on final roster |
| WR | Patrick Carter | Seattle Seahawks | signed August 5, waived August 23 |
| OT | Chris Clark | Minnesota Vikings | signed September 5, on final roster |
| TE | Daniel Coats | Cincinnati Bengals | signed November 9, released November 10, re-signed December 7, on final roster |
| G | Stanley Daniels | Green Bay Packers | signed May 14, waived December 11, moved to the active roster on December 22, on final roster |
| WR | Britt Davis | New York Jets | signed August 5, released September 4, assigned to the practice squad September 5, moved to the active roster December 13, on final roster |
| LB | Bruce Davis | New England Patriots | signed June 1, waived July 27 |
| FB | Kyle Eckel | New Orleans Saints | signed June 4, placed on injured reserve June 17 |
| RB | Justin Fargas | Oakland Raiders | signed August 11, released August 30 |
| C | Dustin Fry | Carolina Panthers | signed January 7, released August 19 |
| DE | Jarvis Green | New England Patriots | signed March 9, released September 4 |
| K | Steven Hauschka | Atlanta Falcons/Detroit Lions | signed December 11, on final roster |
| LB | Jason Hunter | Detroit Lions | signed August 19, on final roster |
| CB | Chevis Jackson | New England Patriots | signed December 20, on final roster |
| CB | Nate Jones | Miami Dolphins | signed March 5, on final roster |
| DT | Louis Leonard | New England Patriots | signed December 27, on final roster |
| G | Matt McChesney | Injured reserve | signed January 7, retired on May 16 |
| LB | Lee Robinson | Practice squad player | moved to the active roster on December 7, placed on injured reserve December 27 |
| RB | Kolby Smith | Kansas City Chiefs | signed June 15, waived August 4 |
| TE | Kory Sperry | Miami Dolphins | signed August 24 waived September 3 |
| P | A. J. Trapasso | Tennessee Titans | signed January 7, released June 15 |
| LB | David Veikune | Cleveland Browns | signed November 17, on final roster |
| DT | Kevin Vickerson | Tennessee Titans | signed September 7, on final roster |
| RB | LenDale White | Tennessee Titans | signed August 4, placed on injured reserve September 3 |
| NT | Jamal Williams | San Diego Chargers | signed March 9, on final roster |
| LB | Johnny Williams | Pittsburgh Steelers | signed August 12, waived September 3 |
| OT | Maurice Williams | Jacksonville Jaguars | signed May 6, released June 4 |
| LB | Worrell Williams | Sacramento Mountain Lions (UFL) | signed August 20, released September 4, assigned to practice squad September 5, released September 14 |

| Indicates that the player was a free agent at the end of his respective team's 2009 season. |

=== Departures ===
| Position | Player | Notes |
|---|---|---|
| NT | Chris Baker | released September 3 |
| QB | Tom Brandstater | released June 4 |
| LB | Andra Davis | released March 11 |
| RB | LaMont Jordan | released February 23 |
| LB | Jarvis Moss | waived November 17 |
| DT | J'Vonne Parker | released March 11 |
| C | Seth Olsen | released September 4 |
| DT | Kenny Peterson | released March 10 |
| OT | Tyler Polumbus | waived August 24 |
| LB | Darrell Reid | released September 4 |
| QB | Chris Simms | released March 15 |
| WR | Brandon Stokley | released September 14 |
| C | Casey Wiegmann | released February 23 |

=== Trades ===
- March 14: The Broncos traded fullback Peyton Hillis, a 2011 sixth-round draft selection and a 2012 conditional draft selection to the Cleveland Browns in exchange for quarterback Brady Quinn.
- April 14: Wide receiver Brandon Marshall was traded to the Miami Dolphins in exchange for a 2010 second-round draft selection (later traded to the Baltimore Ravens – see draft section below) and a possible 2011 second-round draft selection.
- April 19: The Broncos were involved in a three-team trade with the Detroit Lions and Philadelphia Eagles, with the team sending tight end Tony Scheffler to the Lions – see draft section below.
- July 30: Running back J. J. Arrington, who was signed to a contract in March after spending the entire 2009 season on the Injured Reserve, was traded to the Philadelphia Eagles for linebacker Joe Mays. However, since Arrington was released by the Eagles prior to the start of the season, the Eagles received the Broncos' sixth-round selection in the 2012 NFL draft.
- September 5: Cornerback Alphonso Smith was traded to the Detroit Lions in exchange for tight end Dan Gronkowski
- September 14: The Broncos acquired running back Laurence Maroney and a 2011 sixth-round draft selection from the New England Patriots in exchange for a 2011 fourth-round draft selection.

=== Draft ===
2010 Denver Broncos Draft
| Round | Selection | Player | Position | College | Notes | Trades |
|---|---|---|---|---|---|---|
| 1 | 22 | Demaryius Thomas | WR | Georgia Tech | signed July 31 | (Note: The Broncos acquired the No. 11 overall selection, along with quarterback Kyle Orton, as part of an April 2009 trade that sent quarterback Jay Cutler to the Chicago Bears. The Broncos later traded the No. 11 selection to the San Francisco 49ers in exchange for the 49ers' first- (No. 13 overall; later traded to the Philadelphia Eagles) and fourth- (No. 113 overall; later traded to the New England Patriots) round selections.) (Note: The Broncos traded their original first-round selection (No. 14 overall) to the Seattle Seahawks in exchange for a 2009 second-round selection.) (Note: The Broncos traded the No. 13 overall selection (see draft note 1) to the Philadelphia Eagles in exchange for the Eagles' first-round selection (No. 24 overall; later traded to the New England Patriots) and two third-round selections – Nos. 70 & 87 overall (the No. 70 selection was later traded to the Baltimore Ravens).) (Note: The Broncos acquired the New England Patriots' first-round selection – No. 22 overall – in exchange for their first- (No. 24 overall; see draft note 3) and fourth- (No. 113 overall; see draft note 1) round selections.) (Note: The Broncos acquired the Baltimore Ravens' first-round selection – No. 25 overall – in exchange for one of their two-second-round selections (No. 43 overall; acquired in a pre-draft trade from the Miami Dolphins in exchange for wide receiver Brandon Marshall), one of their three third-round selections (No. 70 overall; see draft note 3) and their original fourth-round selection (No. 114 overall).) |
| 1 | 25 | Tim Tebow | QB | Florida | signed July 29 | |
| 2 | 45 | Zane Beadles | OT | Utah | signed July 27 | – |
| 3 | 80 | J. D. Walton | C | Baylor | signed June 17 | – |
| 3 | 87 | Eric Decker | WR | Minnesota | signed July 27 | (Note: See draft note 3.) |
| 4 | None | | | | | (Note: See draft notes 1, 3, 4 & 5.) |
| 5 | 137 | Perrish Cox | CB | Oklahoma State | signed June 9 | (Note: The Broncos traded their original fifth-round selection (No. 146 overall) and a 2009 seventh-round selection to the Detroit Lions in exchange for a 2009 sixth-round selection.) (Note: The Broncos acquired this fifth-round selection (No. 137 overall) from the Philadelphia Eagles as part of a pre-draft, three-way trade that also involved the Detroit Lions – the Broncos sent tight end Tony Scheffler and their original seventh-round selection (No. 220 overall; later traded to the Eagles during the draft) to the Lions, who sent linebacker Ernie Simms to the Eagles.) (Note: In 2008, the Broncos acquired a No. 158 selection (fifth-round) in a trade that sent guard Montrae Holland to the Dallas Cowboys. In August 2009, the Broncos traded this selection to the New England Patriots in exchange for defensive end Le Kevin Smith and a 2010 seventh-round selection – No. 231 overall. One week later, the Broncos sent the No. 231 selection back to the Patriots in a trade for guard/center Russ Hochstein.) |
| 6 | 183 | Eric Olsen | C | Notre Dame | signed July 24 | – |
| 7 | 225 | Syd'Quan Thompson | CB | California | signed May 21 | (Note: See draft note 9.) (Note: The Broncos acquired these two seventh-round selections (Nos. 225 & 232 overall) from the Tampa Bay Buccaneers in exchange for their 2011 fifth-round selection.) (Note: See draft note 10.) |
| 7 | 232 | Jammie Kirlew | DE | Indiana | signed May 25, waived September 3 | (Note: See draft note 9.) (Note: The Broncos acquired these two seventh-round selections (Nos. 225 & 232 overall) from the Tampa Bay Buccaneers in exchange for their 2011 fifth-round selection.) (Note: See draft note 10.) |

Draft trades

=== Undrafted free agents ===
All undrafted free agents were signed on April 26, unless noted otherwise.

2010 Denver Broncos undrafted free agents
| Player | Position | College | Notes |
|---|---|---|---|
| LB/DE | Kevin Alexander | Clemson | released September 4, assigned to practice squad September 5, promoted to active roster October 16, released December 20 |
| WR | Alric Arnett | West Virginia | waived September 3 |
| RB | Toney Baker | North Carolina State | waived August 23 |
| NT/DE | Jaron Baston | Missouri | released June 17 |
| LB | Devin Bishop | California | released August 20 |
| LB/DT | Korey Bosworth | UCLA | released June 15 |
| S | Marcellus Bowman | Boston College | released May 6 |
| RB | Chris Brown | Oklahoma | released May 3 |
| OT | Paul Duncan | Notre Dame | waived September 3 |
| DE | Ben Garland | Air Force | placed on the reserve/military list |
| TE | Riar Geer | Colorado | released September 4, assigned to practice squad September 5 |
| WR | Patrick Honeycutt | Middle Tennessee State | waived August 5 |
| WR | Dicky Lyons, Jr. | Kentucky | signed May 3, waived July 6 |
| T | Chris Marinelli | Stanford | waived July 27 |
| S | Kyle McCarthy | Notre Dame | released September 4, assigned to practice squad September 5, promoted to active roster October 16, placed on injured reserve December 13 |
| TE | Nathan Overbay | Eastern Washington | waived September 3 |
| G | Michael Shumard | Texas A&M | released May 6 |
| NT | Jeff Stehle | Wisconsin | released September 4, assigned to practice squad September 14, released October 13 |
| CB | Cassius Vaughn | Mississippi | on final roster |
| WR | Landis Williams | Maine | waived July 6 |

=== Injuries ===
- August 4: Shortly after the start of training camp, the Broncos suffered a devastating blow to their defense, when outside linebacker/defensive end Elvis Dumervil suffered a torn pectoral muscle in practice. Though there was speculation that Dumervil would be able to return as early as November, he was placed on injured reserve on September 4, and missed the entire 2010 season.
- September 2: During the team's last preseason game at the Minnesota Vikings, running back LenDale White suffered a ruptured Achilles tendon, and missed the 2010 season. White, a Denver native, was signed to a free-agent contract on August 4, after he was released by the Seattle Seahawks in May, and spending his first four seasons with the Tennessee Titans.
- September 4: Wide receiver Brandon Stokley was placed on injured reserve. Ten days later (September 14), was released after reaching an injury settlement. Stokley later signed with the Seattle Seahawks on September 28.
- October 18: Wide receiver Matthew Willis was placed on injured reserve, after suffering a broken foot during the team's 24–20 loss to the New York Jets the previous day.
- December 6: Tight end Dan Gronkowski and linebacker Joe Mays were placed on injured reserve. Gronkowski injured his ankle, while Mays sprained a left knee ligament, during the Broncos Week 13 loss to the Kansas City Chiefs the previous day.
- December 22: Fullback Spencer Larsen was placed on injured reserve, due to an ankle injury that he suffered during the Broncos' Week 15 loss to the Oakland Raiders three days earlier.
- December 23: Placekicker Matt Prater was placed on injured reserve. Prater had been bothered by a nagging groin injury for several weeks, and had not played since the team's Week 13 loss to the Kansas City Chiefs.
- December 27: Linebacker Lee Robinson was placed on injured reserve, after suffering a hamstring injury during the Broncos' Week 16 win over the Houston Texans the previous day.

== Staff ==
2010 Denver Broncos staff
| Front office: Chairman/president/CEO – Pat Bowlen; general manager – Brian Xanders; Director of football administration – Mike Bluem; Director of college scouting – Matt Russell; Director of pro personnel – Keith Kidd; Assistant director of college scouting – Lenny McGill; Assistant director of pro personnel – Anthony Kelly; Vice president of team administration/assistant to head coach – Mark Thewes; Head coaches: Head coach – Josh McDaniels (fired December 6); Offensive coaches: Offensive coordinator – Mike McCoy; Quarterbacks – Ben McDaniels; Running backs – Eric Studesville (interim Head Coach); Wide receivers – Adam Gase; Tight ends – Bob Ligashesky; Offensive line – Clancy Barone; Assistant offensive line – Bob Wylie; Coaching assistant – Brian Callahan | Defensive coaches: Defensive coordinator – Don Martindale; Defensive line – Wayne Nunnely; Assistant linebackers – Roman Phifer; Secondary – Ed Donatell; Defensive assistant – Craig Aukerman; Coaching assistant – Jay Rodgers; Special teams coaches: Special teams coordinator – Mike Priefer; Assistant special teams – Keith Burns; Strength and conditioning: Strength and conditioning – Rich Tuten; Strength and conditioning assistant – Greg Saporta; Strength and conditioning assistant – Justin Lovett |

== Final roster ==
2010 Denver Broncos roster
| Quarterbacks (QB): 8 Kyle Orton; 9 Brady Quinn; 15 Tim Tebow; Running backs (RB): 35 Lance Ball; 28 Correll Buckhalter; 26 Laurence Maroney; 27 Knowshon Moreno; Wide receivers (WR): 17 Britt Davis; 87 Eric Decker; 10 Jabar Gaffney; 84 Brandon Lloyd; 19 Eddie Royal; 88 Demaryius Thomas; Tight ends (TE): 85 Daniel Coats; 89 Daniel Graham; 81 Richard Quinn | Offensive linemen (OL): 68 Zane Beadles G; 63 Jeff Byers C; 78 Ryan Clady T; 75 Chris Clark T; 64 Stanley Daniels G; 74 Ryan Harris T; 71 Russ Hochstein G; 73 Chris Kuper G; 69 Eric Olsen G; 50 J. D. Walton C; Defensive linemen (DL): 97 Justin Bannan DE; 91 Ronald Fields NT; 94 Louis Leonard DE; 98 Ryan McBean DE; 79 Marcus Thomas DE; 99 Kevin Vickerson DE; 76 Jamal Williams NT | Linebackers (LB): 56 Robert Ayers OLB; 57 Mario Haggan ILB; 52 Jason Hunter OLB; 90 David Veikune OLB; 55 D. J. Williams ILB; 59 Wesley Woodyard ILB; Defensive backs (DB): 24 Champ Bailey CB; 30 David Bruton S; 32 Perrish Cox CB; 20 Brian Dawkins SS; 21 André Goodman CB; 23 Renaldo Hill FS; 29 Chevis Jackson CB; 33 Nate Jones; 31 Darcel McBath SS; 22 Syd'Quan Thompson CB; 41 Cassius Vaughn CB; Special teams (ST): 4 Britton Colquitt P; 3 Stephen Hauschka K; 66 Lonie Paxton LS | Practice squad: 58 Dominic Douglas LB; 37 Jeremiah Johnson RB; 36 Brandon Minor RB; 86 John Nalbone TE; 38 Nick Polk S; 13 Eron Riley WR; 95 Jeff Stehle NT; 96 Mitch Unrein DE; Reserve: 92 Elvis Dumervil OLB (IR); 39 Kyle Eckel FB (IR); -- Ben Garland DE (Military); 82 Dan Gronkowski TE (IR); 48 Braxton Kelley ILB (IR); 46 Spencer Larsen FB (IR); 34 Kyle McCarthy S (IR); 51 Joe Mays ILB (IR); 5 Matt Prater K (IR); 54 Lee Robinson ILB (IR); 25 LenDale White RB (IR); 12 Matt Willis WR (IR); Rookies in italics 53 active, 12 reserve, 8 practice squad |

== Preseason ==
| Week | Date | Opponent | Result | Record | Venue | Recap |
|---|---|---|---|---|---|---|
| 1 | August 15 | at Cincinnati Bengals | L 24–33 | 0–1 | Paul Brown Stadium | Recap |
| 2 | August 21 | Detroit Lions | L 20–25 | 0–2 | Invesco Field at Mile High | Recap |
| 3 | August 29 | Pittsburgh Steelers | W 34–17 | 1–2 | Invesco Field at Mile High | Recap |
| 4 | September 2 | at Minnesota Vikings | L 24–31 | 1–3 | Mall of America Field | Recap |

== Regular season ==
=== Schedule ===
| Week | Date | Opponent | Result | Record | Venue | Recap |
|---|---|---|---|---|---|---|
| 1 | September 12 | at Jacksonville Jaguars | **L** 17–24 | 0–1 | EverBank Field | Recap |
| 2 | September 19 | Seattle Seahawks | **W** 31–14 | 1–1 | Invesco Field at Mile High | Recap |
| 3 | September 26 | Indianapolis Colts | **L** 13–27 | 1–2 | Invesco Field at Mile High | Recap |
| 4 | October 3 | at Tennessee Titans | **W** 26–20 | 2–2 | LP Field | Recap |
| 5 | October 10 | at Baltimore Ravens | **L** 17–31 | 2–3 | M&T Bank Stadium | Recap |
| 6 | October 17 | New York Jets | **L** 20–24 | 2–4 | Invesco Field at Mile High | Recap |
| 7 | October 24 | **Oakland Raiders** | **L** 14–59 | 2–5 | Invesco Field at Mile High | Recap |
| 8 | October 31 | at San Francisco 49ers | **L** 16–24 | 2–6 | (United Kingdom) Wembley Stadium (London) | Recap |
| 9 | Bye | | | | | |
| 10 | November 14 | **Kansas City Chiefs** | **W** 49–29 | 3–6 | Invesco Field at Mile High | Recap |
| 11 | November 22 | at **San Diego Chargers** | **L** 14–35 | 3–7 | Qualcomm Stadium | Recap |
| 12 | November 28 | St. Louis Rams | **L** 33–36 | 3–8 | Invesco Field at Mile High | Recap |
| 13 | December 5 | at **Kansas City Chiefs** | **L** 6–10 | 3–9 | Arrowhead Stadium | Recap |
| 14 | December 12 | at Arizona Cardinals | **L** 13–43 | 3–10 | University of Phoenix Stadium | Recap |
| 15 | December 19 | at **Oakland Raiders** | **L** 23–39 | 3–11 | Oakland–Alameda County Coliseum | Recap |
| 16 | December 26 | Houston Texans | **W** 24–23 | 4–11 | Invesco Field at Mile High | Recap |
| 17 | January 2 | **San Diego Chargers** | **L** 28–33 | 4–12 | Invesco Field at Mile High | Recap |

Note: Intra-division opponents are in bold text.

=== Game summaries ===
==== Week 1: at Jacksonville Jaguars ====
Week One: Denver Broncos at Jacksonville Jaguars – Game summary

| Quarter | 1 | 2 | 3 | 4 | Total |
|---|---|---|---|---|---|
| Broncos | 0 | 7 | 7 | 3 | **17** |
| **Jaguars** | 0 | 7 | 10 | 7 | **24** |

at EverBank Field, Jacksonville, Florida

- Date: September 12
- Game time: 1:00 p.m. EDT/11:00 a.m. MDT
- Game weather: 90 °F (32 °C), rain clouds
- Game attendance: 63,636
- Referee: Walt Coleman
- TV announcers (CBS): Kevin Harlan and Solomon Wilcots
- Recap, Gamebook

Game information

**First quarter**

- No scoring plays

**Second quarter**

- JAX – 0:50 Marcedes Lewis 21-yard TD pass from David Garrard, Josh Scobee kick. Drive: 6 plays, 60 yards, 3:09. (JAX 7–0)
- DEN – 0:16 Jabar Gaffney 8-yard TD pass from Kyle Orton, Matt Prater kick. Drive: 4 plays, 74 yards, 0:34. (tied 7–7)

**Third quarter**

- JAX – 10:43 Marcedes Lewis 10-yard TD pass from David Garrard, Josh Scobee kick. Drive: 7 plays, 53 yards, 4:17. (JAX 14–7)
- DEN – 4:07 Knowshon Moreno 1-yard TD run, Matt Prater kick. Drive: 4 plays, 40 yards, 1:59. (tied 14–14)
- JAX – 0:45 Josh Scobee 45-yard FG. Drive: 7 plays, 26 yards, 3:22. (JAX 17–14)

**Fourth quarter**

- DEN – 11:20 Matt Prater 54-yard FG. Drive: 9 plays, 44 yards, 4:25. (tied 17–17)
- JAX – 7:59 Kassim Osgood 24-yard TD pass from David Garrard, Josh Scobee kick. Drive: 7 plays, 83 yards, 3:21. **(JAX 24–17)**

**Top passers**

- DEN – Kyle Orton: 21/33, 295 yards, 1 TD, 1 INT
- JAX – David Garrard: 16/21, 170 yards, 3 TD

**Top rushers**

- DEN – Knowshon Moreno: 15 rushes, 60 yards, 1 TD
- JAX – Maurice Jones-Drew: 23 rushes, 98 yards

**Top receivers**

- DEN – Brandon Lloyd: 5 receptions, 117 yards
- JAX – Mike Thomas: 6 receptions, 89 yards

**Top tacklers**

- DEN – D. J. Williams: 9 tackles, 2 assists
- JAX – Sean Considine: 6 tackles

The Broncos began their 2010 season at EverBank Field against the Jacksonville Jaguars. After a scoreless first quarter, the Broncos trailed late in the second quarter, as Jaguars' quarterback David Garrard completed a 21-yard touchdown pass to tight end Marcedes Lewis. The Broncos answered prior to halftime, as quarterback Kyle Orton found wide receiver Jabar Gaffney on an 8-yard touchdown pass. The Jaguars reclaimed the lead in the third quarter, as Garrard hooked up with Lewis again on a 10-yard touchdown pass. The Broncos responded with a 1-yard touchdown run from running back Knowshon Moreno. However, the Jaguars grabbed the lead again, with a 45-yard field goal by placekicker Josh Scobee. The Broncos caught up in the fourth quarter with a 54-yard field goal by placekicker Matt Prater. However, the Jaguars got the last laugh, as Garrard completed a 24-yard touchdown pass to wide receiver Kassim Osgood.

==== Week 2: vs. Seattle Seahawks ====
Week Two: Seattle Seahawks at Denver Broncos – Game summary

| Quarter | 1 | 2 | 3 | 4 | Total |
|---|---|---|---|---|---|
| Seahawks | 0 | 0 | 7 | 7 | **14** |
| **Broncos** | 7 | 10 | 7 | 7 | **31** |

at INVESCO Field at Mile High, Denver, Colorado

- Date: September 19
- Game time: 2:05 pm. MDT
- Game weather: 91 °F (33 °C), sunny
- Game attendance: 75,130
- Referee: Walt Anderson
- TV announcers (Fox): Kenny Albert, Daryl Johnston and Tony Siragusa
- Recap, Gamebook

Game information

**First quarter**

- DEN – 3:48 Eddie Royal 13-yard TD pass from Kyle Orton, Matt Prater kick. Drive: 3 plays, 13 yards, 1:16. (DEN 7–0)

**Second quarter**

- DEN – 10:30 Correll Buckhalter 1-yard TD run, Matt Prater kick. Drive: 10 plays, 81 yards, 4:41. (DEN 14–0)
- DEN – 0:11 Matt Prater 20-yard FG. Drive: 16 plays, 91 yards, 6:07. (DEN 17–0)

**Third quarter**

- SEA – 9:47 Ben Obomanu 11-yard TD pass from Matt Hasselbeck, Olindo Mare kick. Drive: 5 plays, 22 yards, 2:04. (DEN 17–7)
- DEN – 3:31 Knowshon Moreno 1-yard TD run, Matt Prater kick. Drive: 10 plays, 80 yards, 8:16. (DEN 24–7)

**Fourth quarter**

- DEN – 9:11 Demaryius Thomas 21-yard TD pass from Kyle Orton, Matt Prater kick. Drive: 14 plays, 80 yards, 7:56. (DEN 31–7)
- SEA – 5:59 Matt Hasselbeck 20-yard TD run, Olindo Mare kick. Drive: 8 plays, 80 yards, 3:12. **(DEN 31–14)**

**Top passers**

- SEA – Matt Hasselbeck: 20/35, 233 yards, 1 TD, 3 INT
- DEN – Kyle Orton: 25/35, 307 yards, 2 TD

**Top rushers**

- SEA – Justin Forsett: 8 rushes, 44 yards
- DEN – Knowshon Moreno: 24 rushes, 51 yards, 1 TD

**Top receivers**

- SEA – Golden Tate: 1 reception, 52 yards
- DEN – Demaryius Thomas: 8 receptions, 97 yards, 1 TD

**Top tacklers**

- SEA – Lawyer Milloy and Earl Thomas: 7 tackles each (1 assist by Milloy)
- DEN – Brian Dawkins and Nate Jones: 6 tackles each (2 assists by Dawkins)

Hoping to rebound from their season-opening loss to the Jaguars, the Broncos played on home ground for an interconference duel with the Seattle Seahawks. In the first quarter, the Broncos took the early lead, as quarterback Kyle Orton completed a 13-yard touchdown pass to wide receiver Eddie Royal, followed in the second quarter by a 1-yard touchdown run from running back Correll Buckhalter and a 20-yard field goal by placekicker Matt Prater. The Seahawks got on the board in the third quarter, when quarterback Matt Hasselbeck completed an 11-yard touchdown pass to wide receiver Ben Obomanu, but the Broncos replied with a 1-yard touchdown run from running back Knowshon Moreno. The Broncos increased their lead in the fourth quarter, when Orton threw a 21-yard touchdown pass to wide receiver Demaryius Thomas. The Seahawks replied, with Hasselbeck scrambling 20 yards for a touchdown, but the Broncos' lead was too much for Seattle to overcome.

==== Week 3: vs. Indianapolis Colts ====
Week Three: Indianapolis Colts at Denver Broncos – Game summary

| Quarter | 1 | 2 | 3 | 4 | Total |
|---|---|---|---|---|---|
| **Colts** | 6 | 7 | 7 | 7 | **27** |
| Broncos | 0 | 3 | 10 | 0 | **13** |

at INVESCO Field at Mile High, Denver, Colorado

- Date: September 26
- Game time: 2:15 pm. MDT
- Game weather: 85 °F (29 °C), sunny
- Game attendance: 76,401
- Referee: Alberto Riveron
- TV announcers (CBS): Jim Nantz and Phil Simms
- Recap, Gamebook

Game information

**First quarter**

- IND – 7:35 Adam Vinatieri 38-yard FG. Drive: 8 plays, 44 yards, 3:11. (IND 3–0)
- IND – 1:38 Adam Vinatieri 33-yard FG. Drive: 4 plays, −1 yards, 0:53. (IND 6–0)

**Second quarter**

- IND – 10:37 Austin Collie 5-yard TD pass from Peyton Manning, Adam Vinatieri kick. Drive: 7 plays, 26 yards, 3:00. (IND 13–0)
- DEN – 0:12 Matt Prater 25-yard FG. Drive: 11 plays, 54 yards, 1:37. (IND 13–3)

**Third quarter**

- DEN – 11:40 Brandon Lloyd 48-yard TD pass from Kyle Orton, Matt Prater kick. Drive: 6 plays, 80 yards, 3:20. (IND 13–10)
- IND – 4:51 Blair White 9-yard TD pass from Peyton Manning, Adam Vinatieri kick. Drive: 10 plays, 79 yards, 4:40. (IND 20–10)
- DEN – 2:24 Matt Prater 34-yard FG. Drive: 6 plays, 64 yards, 2:27. (IND 20–13)

**Fourth quarter**

- IND – 4:26 Austin Collie 23-yard TD pass from Peyton Manning, Adam Vinatieri kick. Drive: 9 plays, 88 yards, 4:16. **(IND 27–13)**

**Top passers**

- IND – Peyton Manning: 27/43, 325 yards, 3 TD
- DEN – Kyle Orton: 37/57, 476 yards 1 TD, 1 INT

**Top rushers**

- IND – Joseph Addai: 13 rushes, 29 yards
- DEN – Laurence Maroney: 12 rushes, 24 yards

**Top receivers**

- IND – Austin Collie: 12 receptions, 171 yards, 2 TD
- DEN – Brandon Lloyd: 6 receptions, 169 yards, 1 TD

**Top tacklers**

- IND – Kelvin Hayden: 10 tackles
- DEN – Nate Jones: 6 tackles, 1 assist

Coming off their win over the Seahawks, the Broncos remained on home ground for an AFC duel with the Indianapolis Colts. In the first quarter, the Broncos trailed early when Colts' placekicker Adam Vinatieri nailed field goals from 38 and 33 yards. This was followed in the second quarter by quarterback Peyton Manning throwing a 5-yard touchdown pass to wide receiver Austin Collie. The Broncos got on the board, with placekicker Matt Prater nailing a 25-yard field goal. In the third quarter, the Broncos cut the lead, when quarterback Kyle Orton completed a 48-yard touchdown pass to wide receiver Brandon Lloyd, but the Colts replied, with Manning throwing a 9-yard touchdown pass to wide receiver Blair White. The Broncos responded, with Prater hitting a 34-yard field goal, but they trailed further in the fourth quarter, when Manning found Collie on a 23-yard touchdown pass, sealing the win for Indianapolis.

Notes

Prior to the game, a moment of silence was held for wide receiver Kenny McKinley, who died on September 20, with the team paying tribute to him by placing a No. 11 decal on their helmets in his honor.

==== Week 4: at Tennessee Titans ====
Week Four: Denver Broncos at Tennessee Titans – Game summary

| Quarter | 1 | 2 | 3 | 4 | Total |
|---|---|---|---|---|---|
| **Broncos** | 0 | 10 | 6 | 10 | **26** |
| Titans | 0 | 10 | 10 | 0 | **20** |

at LP Field, Nashville, Tennessee

- Date: October 3
- Game time: 12:00 p.m. CDT/11:00 am. MDT
- Game weather: 54 °F (12 °C), cloudy
- Game attendance: 69,143
- Referee: Clete Blakeman
- TV announcers (CBS): Kevin Harlan and Solomon Wilcots
- Recap, Gamebook

Game information

**First quarter**

- No scoring plays

**Second quarter**

- DEN – 11:24 Eddie Royal 2-yard TD pass from Kyle Orton, Matt Prater kick. Drive: 5 plays, 68 yards, 2:23. (DEN 7–0)
- TEN – 9:18 Kenny Britt 8-yard TD pass from Vince Young, Rob Bironas kick. Drive: 4 plays, 71 yards, 2:06. (tied 7–7)
- DEN – 0:23 Matt Prater 36-yard FG. Drive: 13 plays, 62 yards, 4:28. (DEN 10–7)
- TEN – 0:00 Rob Bironas 55-yard FG. Drive: 4 plays, 26 yards, 0:23. (tied 10–10)

**Third quarter**

- DEN – 10:30 Matt Prater 36-yard FG. Drive: 9 plays, 51 yards, 4:30. (DEN 13–10)
- TEN – 10:19 Marc Mariani 98-yard kickoff return for a TD, Rob Bironas kick. Drive: 0:11. (TEN 17–13)
- DEN – 8:12 Matt Prater 35-yard FG. Drive: 4 plays, 6 yards, 2:07. (TEN 17–16)
- TEN – 5:00 Rob Bironas 46-yard FG. Drive: 7 plays, 39 yards, 3:12. (TEN 20–16)

**Fourth quarter**

- DEN – 1:33 Correll Buckhalter 6-yard TD pass from Kyle Orton, Matt Prater kick. Drive: 5 plays, 49 yards, 1:09. (DEN 23–20)
- DEN – 0:28 Matt Prater 36-yard FG. Drive: 4 plays, −1 yards, 1:05. **(DEN 26–20)**

**Top passers**

- DEN – Kyle Orton: 35/50, 341 yards, 2 TD, 1 INT
- TEN – Vince Young: 17/28, 173 yards, 1 TD

**Top rushers**

- DEN – Kyle Orton: 3 rushes, 11 yards
- TEN – Chris Johnson: 19 rushes, 53 yards

**Top receivers**

- DEN – Brandon Lloyd: 11 receptions, 115 yards
- TEN – Nate Washington: 4 receptions, 42 yards

**Top tacklers**

- DEN – D. J. Williams: 8 tackles, 2 assists
- TEN – Alterraun Verner: 11 tackles

Hoping to rebound from their loss to the Colts, the Broncos traveled to Nashville to face the Tennessee Titans at LP Field. After a scoreless first quarter, the Broncos took the lead in the second quarter, as quarterback Kyle Orton threw a 2-yard touchdown pass to wide receiver Eddie Royal. The Titans responded, with quarterback Vince Young throwing an 8-yard touchdown pass to wide receiver Kenny Britt. The Broncos retook the lead with a 36-yard field goal by placekicker Matt Prater, but The Titans replied, when placekicker Rob Bironas nailed an incredible 55-yard field goal just before halftime. In the third quarter, the Broncos took the lead again, with another 36-yard field goal by Prater, but Titans' wide receiver Marc Mariani returned the ensuing kickoff 98 yards for a touchdown, putting Tennessee ahead 17–13. Tennessee's lead was narrowed, with a 35-yard field goal by Prater, but was increased again with a 46-yard field goal by Bironas. In the fourth quarter, the Broncos pulled ahead, when Orton completed a 6-yard touchdown pass to running back Correll Buckhalter. After the Titans fumbled the ensuing kickoff, the Broncos increased their lead with 28 seconds remaining, with a 36-yard field goal by Prater. The Broncos' defense thwarted the Titans' final desperation drive of the game.

==== Week 5: at Baltimore Ravens ====
Week Five: Denver Broncos at Baltimore Ravens – Game summary

| Quarter | 1 | 2 | 3 | 4 | Total |
|---|---|---|---|---|---|
| Broncos | 0 | 7 | 0 | 10 | **17** |
| **Ravens** | 7 | 10 | 0 | 14 | **31** |

at M&T Bank Stadium, Baltimore, Maryland

- Date: October 10
- Game time: 1:00 pm. EDT/11:00 am. MDT
- Game weather: 67 °F (19 °C), sunny
- Game attendance: 71,246
- Referee: Jerome Boger
- TV announcers (CBS): Ian Eagle and Dan Fouts
- Recap, Gamebook

Game information

**First quarter**

- BAL – 0:45 Joe Flacco 1-yard TD run, Billy Cundiff kick. Drive: 9 plays, 73 yards, 4:36. (BAL 7–0)

**Second quarter**

- BAL – 10:16 Ray Rice 1-yard TD run, Billy Cundiff kick. Drive: 5 plays, 72 yards, 2:30. (BAL 14–0)
- BAL – 9:21 Billy Cundiff 37-yard FG. Drive: 4 plays, 2 yards, 0:48. (BAL 17–0)
- DEN – 0:48 Brandon Lloyd 42-yard TD pass from Kyle Orton, Matt Prater kick. Drive: 5 plays, 59 yards, 1:09. (BAL 17–7)

**Third quarter**

- No scoring plays

**Fourth quarter**

- BAL – 14:21 Ray Rice 1-yard TD run, Billy Cundiff kick. Drive: 14 plays, 72 yards, 7:25. (BAL 24–7)
- DEN – 11:50 Matt Prater38-yard FG. Drive: 8 plays, 61 yards, 2:31. (BAL 24–10)
- BAL – 5:06 Willis McGahee 30-yard TD run, Billy Cundiff kick. Drive: 11 plays, 90 yards, 6:44. (BAL 31–10)
- DEN – 0:35 Brandon Lloyd 44-yard TD pass from Kyle Orton, Matt Prater kick. Drive: 5 plays, 90 yards, 1:16. **(BAL 31–17)**

**Top passers**

- DEN – Kyle Orton: 23/38, 314 yards, 2 TD
- BAL – Joe Flacco: 14/25, 196 yards

**Top rushers**

- DEN – Laurence Maroney: 6 rushes, 27 yards
- BAL – Ray Rice: 27 rushes, 133 yards, 2 TD

**Top receivers**

- DEN – Brandon Lloyd: 5 receptions, 135 yards, 2 TD
- BAL – Ed Dickson: 1 reception, 58 yards

**Top tacklers**

- DEN – D. J. Williams: 10 tackles, 5 assists
- BAL – Ray Lewis and Fabian Washington: 5 tackles each (1 assist by Lewis)

Coming off their win at Tennessee, the Broncos traveled to M&T Bank Stadium for an AFC duel with the Baltimore Ravens. In the first quarter, the Broncos trailed early, with Ravens' quarterback Joe Flacco scrambling for a 1-yard touchdown, followed in the second quarter by a 1-yard touchdown run by running back Ray Rice, and a 37-yard field goal by placekicker Billy Cundiff. The Broncos got on the board, when quarterback Kyle Orton threw a 42-yard touchdown pass to wide receiver Brandon Lloyd. After a scoreless third quarter, the Broncos fell further behind in the fourth quarter, with another 1-yard touchdown run by Rice. The Broncos replied, with a 38-yard field goal by placekicker Matt Prater, but a 30-yard touchdown run by running back Willis McGahee put the Ravens' up 31–10. The Broncos responded, with Orton finding Lloyd again on a 44-yard touchdown pass, but Baltimore's lead was too much to overcome.

==== Week 6: vs. New York Jets ====
Week Six: New York Jets at Denver Broncos – Game summary

| Quarter | 1 | 2 | 3 | 4 | Total |
|---|---|---|---|---|---|
| **Jets** | 0 | 7 | 3 | 14 | **24** |
| Broncos | 0 | 10 | 7 | 3 | **20** |

at INVESCO Field at Mile High, Denver, Colorado

- Date: October 17
- Game time: 2:05 pm. MDT
- Game weather: 73 °F (23 °C), partly cloudy
- Game attendance: 75,982
- Referee: Tony Corrente
- TV announcers (CBS): Greg Gumbel and Dan Dierdorf
- Recap, Gamebook

Game information

**First quarter**

- No scoring plays

**Second quarter**

- NYJ – 14:54 Braylon Edwards 32-yard TD pass from Mark Sanchez, Nick Folk kick. Drive: 13 plays, 77 yards, 6:40. (NYJ 7–0)
- DEN – 11:11 Tim Tebow 5-yard TD run, Matt Prater kick. Drive: 8 plays, 80 yards, 3:43. (tied 7–7)
- DEN – 0:00 Matt Prater 59-yard FG. Drive: 7 plays, 24 yards, 0:39. (DEN 10–7)

**Third quarter**

- NYJ – 6:41 Nick Folk 56-yard FG. Drive: 6 plays, 23 yards, 2:57. (tied 10–10)
- DEN – 1:23 Demaryius Thomas 17-yard TD pass from Kyle Orton, Matt Prater kick. Drive: 5 plays, 66 yards, 1:36. (DEN 17–10)

**Fourth quarter**

- NYJ – 8:36 LaDainian Tomlinson 20-yard TD run, Nick Folk kick. Drive: 5 plays, 54 yards, 2:07. (tied 17–17)
- DEN – 3:55 Matt Prater 48-yard FG. Drive: 9 plays, 50 yards, 4:41. (DEN 20–17)
- NYJ – 1:13 LaDainian Tomlinson 2-yard TD run, Nick Folk kick. Drive: 10 plays, 80 yards, 2:42. **(NYJ 24–20)**

**Top passers**

- NYJ – Mark Sanchez: 17/30, 198 yards, 1 TD, 2 INT
- DEN – Kyle Orton: 14/34, 209 yards, 1 TD

**Top rushers**

- NYJ – LaDainian Tomlinson: 16 rushes, 55 yards, 2 TD
- DEN – Knowshon Moreno: 12 rushes, 48 yards

**Top receivers**

- NYJ – Dustin Keller: 3 receptions, 75 yards
- DEN – Jabar Gaffney: 6 receptions, 81 yards

**Top tacklers**

- NYJ – David Harris: 7 tackles, 1 assist
- DEN – D. J. Williams: 8 tackles, 3 assists

Hoping to rebound from their loss at Baltimore, the Broncos donned their alternate orange jerseys and returned home for an AFC duel with the New York Jets. After a scoreless first quarter, the Jets grabbed the lead in the second quarter, as quarterback Mark Sanchez threw a 32-yard touchdown pass to wide receiver Braylon Edwards. The Broncos responded, with quarterback Tim Tebow scrambling for a 5-yard touchdown run. The Broncos grabbed the lead just before halftime, with a 59-yard field goal by placekicker Matt Prater. In the third quarter, the Jets responded, with a 56-yard field goal by placekicker Nick Folk. The Broncos took the lead, when quarterback Kyle Orton threw a 17-yard touchdown pass to wide receiver Demaryius Thomas. The Jets responded midway through the fourth quarter, after running back LaDainian Tomlinson ran for a 20-yard touchdown. The Broncos grabbed the lead again, with a 48-yard field goal by Prater. However, following a pass-interference penalty on Broncos' cornerback Renaldo Hill near the goal line, the Jets pulled ahead, with a Tomlinson 2-yard touchdown run. The Jets' defense thwarted the Broncos' last drive of the game.

==== Week 7: vs. Oakland Raiders ====
Week Seven: Oakland Raiders at Denver Broncos – Game summary

| Quarter | 1 | 2 | 3 | 4 | Total |
|---|---|---|---|---|---|
| **Raiders** | 24 | 14 | 21 | 0 | **59** |
| Broncos | 0 | 7 | 7 | 0 | **14** |

at INVESCO Field at Mile High, Denver, Colorado

- Date: October 24
- Game time: 2:15 pm. MDT
- Game weather: 63 °F (17 °C), mostly cloudy
- Game attendance: 75,835
- Referee: Terry McAulay
- TV announcers (CBS): Ian Eagle and Dan Fouts
- Recap, Gamebook

Game information

**First quarter**

- OAK – 10:44 Zach Miller 43-yard TD pass from Jason Campbell, Sebastian Janikowski kick. Drive: 9 plays, 80 yards, 4:16. (OAK 7–0)
- OAK – 10:36 Chris Johnson 30-yard interception return for a TD, Sebastian Janikowski kick. (OAK 14–0)
- OAK – 8:58 Darren McFadden 4-yard TD run, Sebastian Janikowski kick. Drive: 3 plays, 21 yards, 1:04. (OAK 21–0)
- OAK – 4:20 Sebastian Janikowski 31-yard FG. Drive: 7 plays, 44 yards, 2:52. (OAK 24–0)

**Second quarter**

- OAK – 14:36 Darren McFadden 19-yard TD pass from Jason Campbell, Sebastian Janikowski kick. Drive: 9 plays, 57 yards, 3:15. (OAK 31–0)
- OAK – 7:58 Darren McFadden 4-yard TD run, Sebastian Janikowski kick. Drive: 3 plays, 14 yards 1:48. (OAK 38–0)
- DEN – 1:56 Knowshon Moreno 7-yard TD pass from Kyle Orton, Matt Prater kick. Drive: 9 plays, 68 yards, 3:17. (OAK 38–7)

**Third quarter**

- DEN – 13:34 Knowshon Moreno 27-yard TD pass from Kyle Orton, Matt Prater kick. Drive: 3 plays, 64 yards, 1:26. (OAK 38–14)
- OAK – 7:33 Marcel Reece 1-yard TD run, Sebastian Janikowski kick. Drive: 10 plays, 80 yards, 6:01. (OAK 45–14)
- OAK – 5:28 Darren McFadden 57-yard TD run, Sebastian Janikowski kick. Drive: 1 play, 57 yards, 0:11. (OAK 52–14)
- OAK – 0:27 Michael Bush 1-yard TD run, Sebastian Janikowski kick. Drive: 7 plays, 68 yards, 3:59. **(OAK 59–14)**

**Fourth quarter**

- No scoring plays

**Top passers**

- OAK – Jason Campbell: 12/20, 204 yards, 2 TD
- DEN – Kyle Orton: 12/29, 198 yards, 2 TD, 1 INT

**Top rushers**

- OAK – Darren McFadden: 16 rushes, 165 yards, 3 TD
- DEN – Knowshon Moreno: 14 rushes, 53 yards

**Top receivers**

- OAK – Zach Miller: 3 receptions, 65 yards, 1 TD
- DEN – Jabar Gaffney: 4 receptions, 54 yards

**Top tacklers**

- OAK – Richard Seymour, Mike Mitchell, Michael Huff, Tyvon Branch and Quentin Groves: 3 tackles each (1 assist by Seymour, Mitchell and Huff)
- DEN – Marcus Thomas and Mario Haggan: 7 tackles each (3 assists by Thomas, 1 assist by Haggan)

Hoping to rebound from their heartbreaking loss to the Jets, the Broncos remained on home ground for an AFC West rivalry match against the Oakland Raiders. In the first quarter, the Broncos trailed early, as Raiders' quarterback Jason Campbell completed a 43-yard touchdown pass to tight end Zach Miller. The Raiders scored again, after cornerback Chris Johnson returned an interception by quarterback Kyle Orton 30 yards for a touchdown. This was followed by a 4-yard touchdown run by running back Darren McFadden and a 31-yard field goal by placekicker Sebastian Janikowski. Things got much worse for the Broncos in the second quarter, as Campbell threw a 19-yard touchdown pass to McFadden, followed by a McFadden 4-yard touchdown run that gave Oakland a 38–0 lead midway through the second quarter. The Broncos finally got on the board with Orton finding running back Knowshon Moreno on a 7-yard touchdown pass, followed in the third quarter by a 27-yard touchdown pass from Orton to Moreno. However, the Raiders struck back, with a 1-yard touchdown run by fullback Marcel Reece, followed by a 57-yard touchdown run by McFadden and a 1-yard touchdown run by running back Michael Bush. Both teams were held scoreless in the fourth quarter.

Notes

This was the Broncos' worst defeat since a 55–10 loss to the San Francisco 49ers in Super Bowl XXIV. The loss also tied the highest point total that the Broncos have allowed in a single game, since a 59–7 loss to the Kansas City Chiefs in 1963.

==== Week 8: at San Francisco 49ers ====
International Series

Week Eight: Denver Broncos at San Francisco 49ers – Game summary

| Quarter | 1 | 2 | 3 | 4 | Total |
|---|---|---|---|---|---|
| Broncos | 0 | 0 | 7 | 9 | **16** |
| **49ers** | 3 | 0 | 0 | 21 | **24** |

at Wembley Stadium, London, England

- Date: October 31
- Game time: 5:00 p.m. GMT/11:00 am. MDT
- Game weather: 54 °F (12 °C), mostly cloudy
- Game attendance: 83,941
- Referee: Scott Green
- TV announcers (CBS): Greg Gumbel and Dan Dierdorf
- Recap, Gamebook

Game information

**First quarter**

- SF – 0:23 Joe Nedney 34-yard FG. Drive: 13 plays, 65 yards, 7:31. (SF 3–0)

**Second quarter**

- No scoring plays

**Third quarter**

- DEN – 8:08 Tim Tebow 1-yard TD run, Matt Prater kick. Drive: 5 plays, 89 yards, 2:15. (DEN 7–3)

**Fourth quarter**

- DEN – 14:13 Matt Prater 32-yard FG. Drive: 7 plays, 44 yards, 2:11. (DEN 10–3)
- SF – 11:51 Troy Smith 1-yard TD run, Joe Nedney kick. Drive: 5 plays, 56 yards, 2:22. (tied 10–10)
- SF – 7:23 Michael Crabtree 28-yard TD pass from Troy Smith, Joe Nedney kick. Drive: 4 plays, 48 yards, 2:11. (SF 17–10)
- SF – 3:47 Frank Gore 3-yard TD run, Joe Nedney kick. Drive: 6 plays, 18 yards, 3:20. (SF 24–10)
- DEN – 2:19 Brandon Lloyd 1-yard TD pass from Kyle Orton, kick blocked. Drive: 7 plays, 78 yards, 1:28. **(SF 24–16)**

**Top passers**

- DEN – Kyle Orton: 28/40, 370 yards, 1 TD, 1 INT
- SF – Troy Smith: 12/19, 196 yards, 1 TD

**Top rushers**

- DEN – Knowshon Moreno: 11 rushes, 40 yards
- SF – Frank Gore: 29 rushes, 118 yards, 1 TD

**Top receivers**

- DEN – Brandon Lloyd: 7 receptions, 169 yards, 1 TD
- SF – Delanie Walker: 5 receptions, 85 yards

**Top tacklers**

- DEN – D. J. Williams: 9 tackles
- SF – Patrick Willis: 8 tackles, 1 assist

Following their disastrous home loss to the Raiders, the Broncos flew to London, England, for an International Series contest with the San Francisco 49ers at Wembley Stadium. In the first quarter, the Broncos trailed early, with a 34-yard field goal by 49ers' placekicker Joe Nedney. After a scoreless second quarter, the Broncos grabbed the lead in the third quarter, when quarterback Tim Tebow scrambled for a 1-yard touchdown run, followed in the fourth quarter by a 32-yard field goal by placekicker Matt Prater. However, the Broncos suddenly fell behind, with 49ers' quarterback Troy Smith scrambling for a 1-yard touchdown run, followed by his 28-yard touchdown pass to wide receiver Michael Crabtree, and a 3-yard touchdown run by running back Frank Gore. The Broncos tried to rally when quarterback Kyle Orton threw a 1-yard touchdown pass to wide receiver Brandon Lloyd (with a blocked extra-point attempt), but San Francisco's defense stood their ground.

Notes

Less than a month later, the Broncos were subjected to a videotaping scandal involving the team's director of video operations that occurred during a 49ers' walkthrough practice, one day before the game.

==== Week 10: vs. Kansas City Chiefs ====
Week Ten: Kansas City Chiefs at Denver Broncos – Game summary

| Quarter | 1 | 2 | 3 | 4 | Total |
|---|---|---|---|---|---|
| Chiefs | 0 | 10 | 7 | 12 | **29** |
| **Broncos** | 21 | 14 | 7 | 7 | **49** |

at INVESCO Field at Mile High, Denver, Colorado

- Date: November 14
- Game time: 2:05 pm. MST
- Game weather: 43 °F (6 °C), partly cloudy
- Game attendance: 75,334
- Referee: Mike Carey
- TV announcers (CBS): Kevin Harlan and Solomon Wilcots
- Recap, Gamebook

Game information

**First quarter**

- DEN – 12:02 Knowshon Moreno 17-yard TD pass from Kyle Orton, Matt Prater kick. Drive: 8 plays, 80 yards, 2:58. (DEN 7–0)
- DEN – 4:19 Brandon Lloyd 6-yard TD pass from Kyle Orton, Matt Prater kick. Drive: 9 plays, 82 yards, 4:37. (DEN 14–0)
- DEN – 1:19 Jabar Gaffney 40-yard TD pass from Kyle Orton, Matt Prater kick. Drive:' 3 plays, 53 yards, 1:15. (DEN 21–0)

**Second quarter**

- DEN – 10:07 Tim Tebow 1-yard TD run, Matt Prater kick. Drive: 8 plays, 58 yards, 3:10. (DEN 28–0)
- DEN – 5:48 Jason Hunter 75-yard fumble return for a TD, Matt Prater kick. (DEN 35–0)
- KC – Jamaal Charles 5-yard TD pass from Matt Cassel, Ryan Succop kick. Drive: 9 plays, 83 yards, 4:20. (DEN 35–7)
- KC – 0:00 Ryan Succop 40-yard FG. Drive: 1 play, 0:01. (DEN 35–10)

**Third quarter**

- DEN – 9:24 Spencer Larsen 3-yard TD pass from Tim Tebow, Matt Prater kick. Drive: 10 plays, 60 yards, 4:45. (DEN 42–10)
- KC – 2:22 Dwayne Bowe 15-yard TD pass from Matt Cassel, Ryan Succop kick. Drive: 4 plays, 38 yards, 1:22. (DEN 42–17)

**Fourth quarter**

- DEN – 11:47 Brandon Lloyd 15-yard TD pass from Kyle Orton, Matt Prater kick. Drive: 10 plays, 66 yards, 5:35. (DEN 49–17)
- KC – 6:54 Chris Chambers 11-yard TD pass from Matt Cassel, two-point pass failed. Drive: 15 plays, 83 yards, 4:53. (DEN 49–23)
- KC – 0:10 Dwayne Bowe 22-yard TD pass from Matt Cassel, two-point pass failed. Drive: 6 plays, 69 yards, 1:45. **(DEN 49–29)**

**Top passers**

- KC – Matt Cassel: 33/53, 469 yards, 4 TD
- DEN – Kyle Orton: 22/34, 296 yards, 4 TD

**Top rushers**

- KC – Jamaal Charles: 14 rushes, 41 yards
- DEN – Knowshon Moreno: 22 rushes, 106 yards

**Top receivers**

- KC – Dwayne Bowe: 13 receptions, 186 yards, 2 TD
- DEN – Brandon Lloyd: 6 receptions, 90 yards, 2 TD

**Top tacklers**

- KC – Derrick Johnson: 12 tackles
- DEN – Champ Bailey: 9 tackles, 1 assist

Coming off their overseas trip to London and subsequent bye week, the Broncos donned their alternate orange jerseys and returned home for an AFC West duel against the Kansas City Chiefs, hoping to snap a 4-game losing streak. In the first quarter, quarterback Kyle Orton, playing on his 28th birthday, threw three touchdown passes: a 17-yarder to running back Knowshon Moreno, a 6-yarder to wide receiver Brandon Lloyd and a 40-yarder to wide receiver Jabar Gaffney. In the second quarter, quarterback Tim Tebow ran for a 1-yard touchdown, followed by linebacker Jason Hunter returning a fumble 75 yards for a touchdown, giving the Broncos a commanding 35–0 lead before the two-minute warning. The Chiefs got on the board, with a 5-yard touchdown run from running back Jamaal Charles, followed by a 40-yard field goal by placekicker Ryan Succop just before halftime. In the third quarter, Tim Tebow threw his first touchdown pass—a 3-yarder to fullback Spencer Larsen, but the Chiefs responded, with quarterback Matt Cassel throwing a 15-yard touchdown pass to wide receiver Dwayne Bowe. In the fourth quarter, Orton threw his fourth touchdown pass of the game—a 15-yarder to Lloyd. The Chiefs responded, with Cassel throwing a pair of touchdown passes—an 11-yarder to wide receiver Chris Chambers, followed by a 22-yarder to Bowe (both with failed two-point conversion attempts), but the outcome had already been decided in the Broncos' favor.

==== Week 11: at San Diego Chargers ====
Week Eleven: Denver Broncos at San Diego Chargers – Game summary

| Quarter | 1 | 2 | 3 | 4 | Total |
|---|---|---|---|---|---|
| Broncos | 7 | 0 | 0 | 7 | **14** |
| **Chargers** | 7 | 14 | 7 | 7 | **35** |

at Qualcomm Stadium, San Diego, California

- Date: November 22
- Game time: 6:30 pm. MST/5:30 p.m. PST
- Game weather: 55 °F (13 °C), partly cloudy
- Game attendance: 68,482
- Referee: Jeff Triplette
- TV announcers (ESPN): Mike Tirico, Ron Jaworski, Jon Gruden, Suzy Kolber and Michele Tafoya
- Recap, Gamebook

Game information

**First quarter**

- DEN – 12:05 Knowshon Moreno 4-yard TD run, Matt Prater kick. Drive: 6 plays, 69 yards, 2:55. (DEN 7–0)
- SD – 2:14 Malcom Floyd 6-yard TD pass from Philip Rivers, Nate Kaeding kick. Drive: 12 plays, 70 yards, 6:26. (tied 7–7)

**Second quarter**

- SD – 7:58 Mike Tolbert 1-yard TD run, Nate Kaeding kick. Drive: 6 plays, 87 yards, 2:38. (SD 14–7)
- SD – 2:05 Patrick Crayton 40-yard TD pass from Philip Rivers, Nate Kaeding kick. Drive: 2 plays, 54 yards, 0:54. (SD 21–7)

**Third quarter**

- SD – 12:36 Darren Sproles 57-yard TD pass from Philip Rivers, Nate Kaeding kick. Drive: 5 plays, 72 plays, 2:24. (SD 28–7)

**Fourth quarter**

- SD – 14:16 Jacob Hester 3-yard TD pass from Philip Rivers, Nate Kaeding kick. Drive: 11 plays, 53 yards, 6:29. (SD 35–7)
- DEN – 8:48 Brandon Lloyd 13-yard TD pass from Kyle Orton, Matt Prater kick. Drive: 6 plays, 39 yards, 2:39. **(SD 35–14)**

**Top passers**

- DEN – Kyle Orton: 24/38, 217 yards, 1 TD, 1 INT
- SD – Philip Rivers: 15/24, 233 yards, 4 TD, 1 INT

**Top rushers**

- DEN – Knowshon Moreno: 13 rushes, 58 yards, 1 TD
- SD – Mike Tolbert: 25 rushes, 111 yards, 1 TD

**Top receivers**

- DEN – Brandon Lloyd: 6 receptions, 78 yards, 1 TD
- SD – Patrick Crayton: 3 receptions, 105 yards, 1 TD

**Top tacklers**

- DEN – Joe Mays: 6 tackles, 3 assists
- SD – Antoine Cason: 7 tackles, 2 assists

Coming off their dominating win over the Chiefs, the Broncos traveled to Qualcomm Stadium for an AFC West duel with the San Diego Chargers on Monday Night Football. The Broncos delivered the opening strike in the first quarter, with a 4-yard touchdown run from running back Knowshon Moreno. However, the Chargers answered, with quarterback Philip Rivers completing a 6-yard touchdown pass to wide receiver Malcom Floyd. The Chargers took the lead in the second quarter, as fullback Mike Tolbert ran for a 1-yard touchdown, followed by Rivers completing a 40-yard touchdown pass to wide receiver Patrick Crayton. The Chargers added to their lead in the third quarter, as Rivers completed a 57-yard touchdown pass to running back Darren Sproles. In the fourth quarter, the Chargers continued their dominating night, with Rivers completing a 3-yard touchdown pass to fullback Jacob Hester. The Broncos tried to rally, as quarterback Kyle Orton found wide receiver Brandon Lloyd on a 13-yard touchdown pass, but San Diego's lead was too much to overcome.

==== Week 12: vs. St. Louis Rams ====
Week Twelve: St. Louis Rams at Denver Broncos – Game summary

| Quarter | 1 | 2 | 3 | 4 | Total |
|---|---|---|---|---|---|
| **Rams** | 7 | 19 | 7 | 3 | **36** |
| Broncos | 10 | 3 | 0 | 20 | **33** |

at INVESCO Field at Mile High, Denver, Colorado

- Date: November 28
- Game time: 2:15 pm. MST
- Game weather: 45 °F (7 °C), mostly cloudy
- Game attendance: 72,736
- Referee: Bill Leavy
- TV announcers (Fox): Ron Pitts, John Lynch and Nischelle Turner
- Recap, Gamebook

Game information

**First quarter**

- DEN – 11:54 Knowshon Moreno 4-yard TD run, Matt Prater kick. Drive: 7 plays, 80 yards, 3:06. (DEN 7–0)
- DEN – 7:24 Matt Prater 49-yard FG. Drive: 9 plays, 49 yards, 2:53. (DEN 10–0)
- STL – 1:32 Michael Hoomanawanui 36-yard TD pass from Sam Bradford, Josh Brown kick. Drive: 12 plays, 80 plays, 5:52. (DEN 10–7)

**Second quarter**

- DEN – 12:27 Matt Prater 40-yard FG. Drive: 9 plays, 58 yards, 4:05. (DEN 13–7)
- STL – 5:45 Billy Bajema 2-yard TD pass from Sam Bradford, Josh Brown kick. Drive: 13 plays, 80 yards, 6:42. (STL 14–13)
- STL – 2:53 Billy Bajema 26-yard TD pass from Sam Bradford, kick failed. Drive: 4 plays, 71 yards, 1:15. (STL 20–13)
- STL – 0:54 Josh Brown 28-yard FG. Drive: 6 plays, 50 yards, 1:33. (STL 23–13)
- STL – 0:14 Josh Brown 37-yard FG. Drive: 4 plays, 4 yards, 0:33. (STL 26–13)

**Third quarter**

- STL – 8:55 Kenneth Darby 1-yard TD run, Josh Brown kick. Drive: 5 plays, 31 yards, 2:05. (STL 33–13)

**Fourth quarter**

- DEN – 14:54 Brandon Lloyd 41-yard TD pass from Kyle Orton, Matt Prater kick. Drive: 3 plays, 65 yards, 1:01. (STL 33–20)
- STL – 10:50 Josh Brown 26-yard FG. Drive: 8 plays, 67 yards, 4:04. (STL 36–20)
- DEN – 4:50 Eddie Royal 16-yard TD pass from Kyle Orton, two-point pass failed. Drive: 5 plays, 50 yards, 3:09. (STL 36–26)
- DEN – 2:35 Brandon Lloyd 5-yard TD pass from Kyle Orton, Matt Prater kick. Drive: 8 plays, 59 yards, 1:51. **(STL 36–33)**

**Top passers**

- STL – Sam Bradford: 22/37, 308 yards, 3 TD
- DEN – Kyle Orton: 24/41, 347 yards, 3 TD

**Top rushers**

- STL – Stephen Jackson: 29 rushes, 72 yards
- DEN – Knowshon Moreno: 12 rushes, 56 yards, 1 TD

**Top receivers**

- STL – Danario Alexander: 4 receptions, 95 yards
- DEN – Brandon Lloyd: 4 receptions, 76 yards, 2 TD

**Top tacklers**

- STL – Craig Dahl: 6 tackles
- DEN – Jamal Williams: 5 tackles, 3 assists

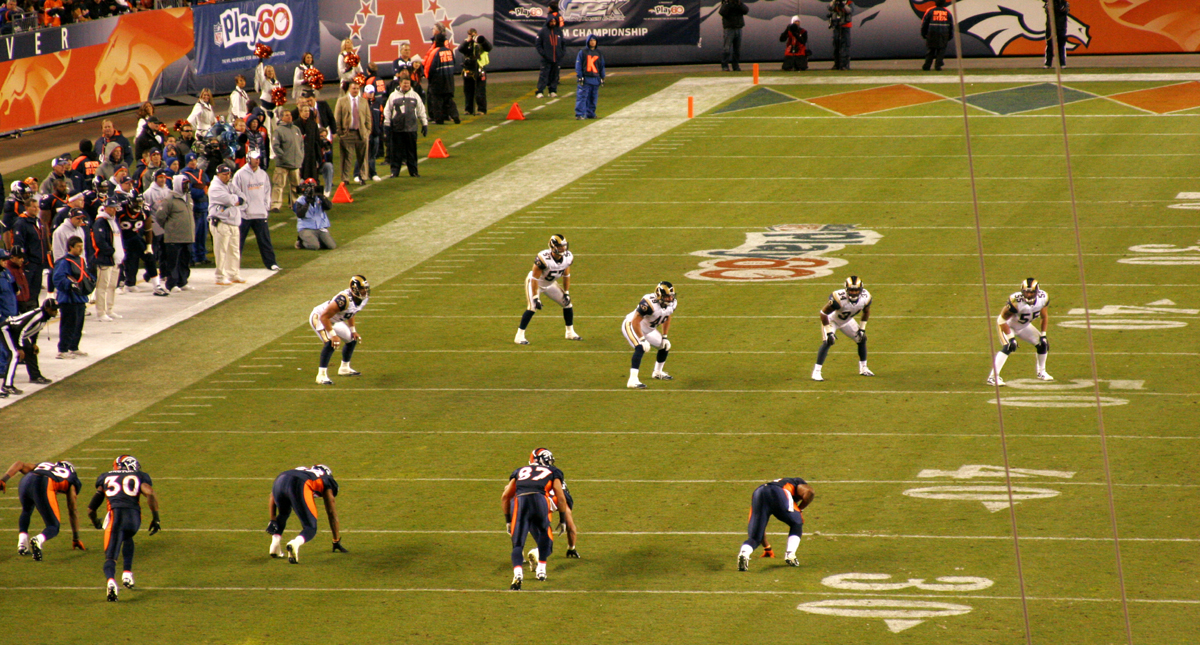
The Broncos attempt an onside kick

Following their Monday Night debacle in San Diego and subsequent videotaping scandal, the Broncos returned home for an interconference match against the St. Louis Rams. In the first quarter, the Broncos jumped out to a 10–0 lead, with a 4-yard touchdown run from running back Knowshon Moreno, followed by a 49-yard field goal by placekicker Matt Prater. The Rams responded, with quarterback Sam Bradford throwing a 36-yard touchdown pass to tight end Michael Hoomanawanui. In the second quarter, The Broncos took a 13–7 lead, with a 40-yard field goal by Prater. However, the Rams reeled off 26 points, starting off with a pair of touchdown passes from Bradford to tight end Billy Bajema—2 and 26 yards—the latter with a missed extra point, followed by a pair of field goals from placekicker Josh Brown—28 and 37 yards—before halftime. In the third quarter, the Rams continued their offensive onslaught, with a 1-yard touchdown run from running back Kenneth Darby, giving St. Louis a 33–13 lead. In the fourth quarter, the Broncos snapped the Rams' streak of 26 unanswered points, with quarterback Kyle Orton throwing a 41-yard touchdown pass to wide receiver Brandon Lloyd, but the Rams responded with a 26-yard field goal from Brown. Trailing 36–20 with four minutes remaining, the Broncos tried to rally, with Orton throwing two touchdown passes—a 16-yarder to wide receiver Eddie Royal (with a failed two-point conversion attempt), followed by a 5-yarder to Lloyd, but the Broncos' rally attempt was cut short by the Rams' defense.

Notes

With the loss, the Broncos matched their loss total from the previous two seasons.

==== Week 13: at Kansas City Chiefs ====
Week Thirteen: Denver Broncos at Kansas City Chiefs – Game summary

| Quarter | 1 | 2 | 3 | 4 | Total |
|---|---|---|---|---|---|
| Broncos | 0 | 3 | 0 | 3 | **6** |
| **Chiefs** | 7 | 3 | 0 | 0 | **10** |

at Arrowhead Stadium, Kansas City, Missouri

- Date: December 5
- Game time: 12:00 pm. CST/11:00 am. MST
- Game weather: 26 °F (−3 °C), sunny
- Game attendance: 67,267
- Referee: Carl Cheffers
- TV announcers (CBS): Ian Eagle and Rich Gannon
- Recap, Gamebook

Game information

**First quarter**

- KC – 1:15 Leonard Pope 2-yard TD pass from Matt Cassel, Ryan Succop kick. Drive: 11 plays, 70 yards, 6:29. (KC 7–0)

**Second quarter**

- DEN – 1:19 Matt Prater 25-yard FG. Drive: 12 plays, 85 yards, 5:20. (KC 7–3)
- KC – 0:03 Ryan Succop 47-yard FG. Drive: 8 plays, 44 yards, 1:16. (KC 10–3)

**Third quarter**

- No scoring plays

**Fourth quarter**

- DEN – 13:42 Matt Prater 41-yard FG. Drive: 8 plays, 44 yards, 2:42. **(KC 10–6)**

**Top passers**

- DEN – Kyle Orton: 9/28, 117 yards
- KC – Matt Cassel: 17/31, 196 yards, 1 TD

**Top rushers**

- DEN – Knowshon Moreno: 23 rushes, 161 yards
- KC – Jamaal Charles: 21 rushes, 116 yards

**Top receivers**

- DEN – Brandon Lloyd: 2 receptions, 31 yards
- KC – Thomas Jones and Tony Moeaki: 4 receptions, 54 yards

**Top tacklers**

- DEN – Perrish Cox: 8 tackles
- KC – Eric Berry and Glenn Dorsey: 6 tackles each (1 assist by Berry)

Hoping to break a two-game losing streak, the Broncos traveled to Arrowhead Stadium for an AFC West rivalry rematch against the Kansas City Chiefs. The Broncos trailed in the first quarter, as Chiefs' quarterback Matt Cassel threw a 2-yard touchdown pass to tight end Leonard Pope, the game's only touchdown. The Broncos responded in the second quarter, with placekicker Matt Prater nailing a 25-yard field goal, but the Chiefs countered, with a 47-yard field goal by placekicker Ryan Succop just before halftime. After a scoreless third quarter, the Broncos cut into the lead with a 41-yard field goal by Prater, but Kansas City's defense prevented anything else from happening.

Notes

With the loss, not only were the Broncos officially eliminated from postseason contention, but they also exceeded their loss total from their previous two seasons.

==== Week 14: at Arizona Cardinals ====
Week Fourteen: Denver Broncos at Arizona Cardinals – Game summary

| Quarter | 1 | 2 | 3 | 4 | Total |
|---|---|---|---|---|---|
| Broncos | 3 | 0 | 0 | 10 | **13** |
| **Cardinals** | 3 | 13 | 3 | 24 | **43** |

at University of Phoenix Stadium, Glendale, Arizona

- Date: December 12
- Game time: 2:15 pm. MST
- Game weather: Played indoors (retractable roof closed)
- Game attendance: 62,223
- Referee: Jerome Boger
- TV announcers (CBS): Bill Macatee and Rich Gannon
- Recap, Gamebook

Game information

**First quarter**

- DEN – 10:36 Steven Hauschka 32-yard FG. Drive: 11 plays, 73 yards, 4:24. (DEN 3–0)
- ARI – 4:35 Jay Feely 36-yard FG. Drive: 4 plays, 5 yards, 0:58. (tied 3–3)

**Second quarter**

- ARI – 11:50 Jay Feely 48-yard FG. Drive: 7 yards, 17 yards, 2:58. (ARI 6–3)
- ARI – 4:02 Jay Feely 5-yard fake-FG run for a TD, Jay Feely kick. Drive: 5 plays, 24 yards, 2:01. (ARI 13–3)
- ARI – 0:02 Jay Feely 55-yard FG. Drive: 8 plays, 37 yards, 1:42. (ARI 16–3)

**Third quarter**

- ARI – 9:40 Jay Feely 23-yard FG. Drive: 10 plays, 72 yards, 5:20. (ARI 19–3)

**Fourth quarter**

- ARI – 14:55 Jay Feely 49-yard FG. Drive: 4 plays, 8 yards, 1:04. (ARI 22–3)
- DEN – 11:20 Steven Hauschka 30-yard FG. Drive: 7 plays, 13 yards, 2:16. (ARI 22–6)
- ARI – 6:07 Tim Hightower 8-yard TD run, Jay Feely kick. Drive: 8 plays, 79 yards, 5:13. (ARI 29–6)
- DEN – 3:31 Knowshon Moreno 1-yard TD run, Steven Hauschka kick. Drive: 7 plays, 71 yards, 2:36. (ARI 29–13)
- ARI – 3:09 Tim Hightower 35-yard TD run, Jay Feely kick. Drive: 3 plays, 41 yards, 0:22. (ARI 36–13)
- ARI – 2:42 Darnell Dockett fumble recovery in the end zone, Jay Feely kick. **(ARI 43–13)**

**Top passers**

- DEN – Kyle Orton: 19/41, 166 yards, 3 INT
- ARI – John Skelton: 15/37, 146 yards

**Top rushers**

- DEN – Knowshon Moreno: 19 rushes, 81 yards, 1 TD
- ARI – Tim Hightower: 18 rushes, 148 yards, 2 TD

**Top receivers**

- DEN – Jabar Gaffney: 3 receptions, 48 yards
- ARI – Larry Fitzgerald: 6 receptions, 72 yards

**Top tacklers**

- DEN – D. J. Williams: 6 tackles, 2 assists
- ARI – Adrian Wilson: 11 tackles

Hoping to snap a three-game losing streak, the Broncos traveled to the University of Phoenix Stadium for an interconference duel with the Arizona Cardinals, whom the Broncos had never lost to in the teams' previous eight meetings. The Broncos took the early lead in the first quarter, with a 32-yard field goal by placekicker Steven Hauschka. However, the Cardinals responded, as placekicker Jay Feely accounted for 22 unanswered points—a 36-yard field goal in the first quarter, a 48-yard field goal, 5-yard touchdown run off a fake field goal and a 55-yard field goal in the second quarter, a 23-yard field goal in the third quarter, and a 49-yard field goal in the fourth quarter. A 30-yard field goal by Hauschka cut the lead to 22–6, but the Cardinals answered with an 8-yard touchdown run by running back Tim Hightower. The Broncos responded with a 1-yard touchdown run by running back Knowshon Moreno, but the Cardinals pulled away, with Hightower running for a 35-yard touchdown, followed by linebacker Daryl Washington returning an interception 40 yards (and defensive end Darnell Dockett recovering a fumble in the end zone for a touchdown).

Notes

This was the Broncos' first-ever loss to the Cardinals in franchise history. The loss also guaranteed the Broncos a fourth-place in the AFC West at the end of the season.

==== Week 15: at Oakland Raiders ====
Week Fifteen: Denver Broncos at Oakland Raiders – Game summary

| Quarter | 1 | 2 | 3 | 4 | Total |
|---|---|---|---|---|---|
| Broncos | 14 | 3 | 3 | 3 | **23** |
| **Raiders** | 14 | 3 | 6 | 16 | **39** |

at Oakland–Alameda County Coliseum, Oakland, California

- Date: December 19
- Game time: 2:15 pm. MST/1:15 pm. PST
- Game weather: 54 °F (12 °C), cloudy/rainy
- Game attendance: 44,246
- Referee: Scott Green
- TV announcers (CBS): Gus Johnson and Steve Tasker
- Recap, Gamebook

Game information

**First quarter**

- OAK – 13:14 Jacoby Ford 71-yard TD run, Sebastian Janikowski kick. Drive: 1 play, 71 yards, 0:12. (OAK 7–0)
- DEN – 9:40 Tim Tebow 40-yard TD run, Steven Hauschka kick. Drive: 3 plays, 26 yards, 1:56. (tied 7–7)
- DEN – 7:38 Brandon Lloyd 33-yard TD pass from Tim Tebow, Steven Hauschka kick. Drive: 2 plays, 32 yards, 0:44. (DEN 14–7)
- OAK – 3:20 Michael Bush 1-yard TD run, Sebastian Janikowski kick. Drive: 8 plays, 69 yards, 4:18. (tied 14–14)

**Second quarter**

- DEN – 14:09 Steven Hauschka 46-yard FG. Drive: 8 plays, 42 yards, 4:11. (DEN 17–14)
- OAK – 1:02 Sebastian Janikowski 49-yard FG. Drive: 5 plays, 23 yards, 1:21. (tied 17–17)

**Third quarter**

- OAK – 7:27 Sebastian Janikowski 35-yard FG. Drive: 4 plays, 6 yards, 1:30. (OAK 20–17)
- DEN – 5:03 Steven Hauschka 35-yard FG. Drive: 6 plays, 47 yards, 2:24. (tied 20–20)
- OAK – 1:29 Sebastian Janikowski 47-yard FG. Drive: 6 plays, 37 yards, 3:34. (OAK 23–20)

**Fourth quarter**

- OAK – 14:32 Marcel Reece 73-yard TD pass from Jason Campbell, Sebastian Janikowski kick. Drive: 1 play, 73 yards, 0:12. (OAK 30–20)
- DEN – 10:04 Steven Hauschka 45-yard FG. Drive: 9 plays, 49 yards, 4:28. (OAK 30–23)
- OAK – 7:37 Quentin Groves tackled Correll Buckhalter in the end zone for a safety (OAK 32–23)
- OAK – 3:37 Michael Bush 1-yard TD run, Sebastian Janikowski kick. Drive: 8 plays, 47 yards, 4:00. **(OAK 39–23)**

**Top passers**

- DEN – Tim Tebow: 8/16 138 yards, 1 TD
- OAK – Jason Campbell: 15/26, 238 yards, 1 TD, 2 INT

**Top rushers**

- DEN – Tim Tebow: 8 rushes, 78 yards, 1 TD
- OAK – Darren McFadden: 20 rushes, 119 yards

**Top receivers**

- DEN – Brandon Lloyd: 4 receptions, 79 yards, 1 TD
- OAK – Marcel Reece: 2 receptions, 79 yards, 1 TD

**Top tacklers**

- DEN – D. J. Williams: 7 tackles, 1 assist
- OAK – Tyvon Branch: 5 tackles

Hoping to snap a four-game losing streak, the Broncos traveled to the Oakland–Alameda County Coliseum, for an AFC West divisional rematch with the Oakland Raiders. In the first quarter, the Raiders grabbed the early lead, with a 71-yard touchdown run by wide receiver Jacoby Ford. The Broncos responded, when quarterback Tim Tebow, starting in place of an injured Kyle Orton, scrambled for a 40-yard touchdown run. The Broncos grabbed the lead, when Tebow threw a 33-yard touchdown pass to wide receiver Brandon Lloyd, but the Raiders responded, with a 1-yard touchdown run by running back Michael Bush. In the second quarter, the Broncos lead again, with a 46-yard field goal by placekicker Steven Hauschka, but the Raiders tied the game with a 49-yard field goal by placekicker Sebastian Janikowski just before halftime. In the third quarter, the Raiders grabbed the lead, with a 35-yard field goal by Janikowski. The Broncos responded, with a 35-yard field goal by Hauschka. Oakland lead again, with a 47-yard field goal by Janikowski. In the fourth quarter, the Raiders widened their lead, when quarterback Jason Campbell threw a 73-yard touchdown pass to fullback Marcel Reece. The Broncos narrowed the lead, with a 45-yard field goal by Hauschka, but the Raiders pulled away, when linebacker Quentin Groves tackled running back Correll Buckhalter in the end zone for a safety, followed by a 1-yard touchdown by Bush.

Notes

With the loss, the Broncos tied their franchise record for losses in a single season. This also was the Broncos last road loss to a division opponent until Week 6 of the 2016 season.

==== Week 16: vs. Houston Texans ====
Week Sixteen: Houston Texans at Denver Broncos – Game summary

| Quarter | 1 | 2 | 3 | 4 | Total |
|---|---|---|---|---|---|
| Texans | 7 | 10 | 6 | 0 | **23** |
| **Broncos** | 0 | 0 | 10 | 14 | **24** |

at INVESCO Field at Mile High, Denver, Colorado

- Date: December 26
- Game time: 2:05 pm. MST
- Game weather: 50 °F (10 °C), partly cloudy
- Game attendance: 73,691
- Referee: Ron Winter
- TV announcers (CBS): Don Criqui and Steve Beuerlein
- Recap, Gamebook

Game information

**First quarter**

- HOU – 2:41 Arian Foster 3-yard TD run, Neil Rackers kick. Drive: 6 plays, 91 yards, 3:11. (HOU 7–0)

**Second quarter**

- HOU – 11:43 Owen Daniels 3-yard TD pass from Matt Schaub, Neil Rackers kick. Drive: 6 plays, 86 yards, 3:42. (HOU 14–0)
- HOU – 0:22 Neil Rackers 34-yard FG. Drive: 8 plays, 37 yards, 3:42. (HOU 17–0)

**Third quarter**

- DEN – 12:58 Correll Buckhalter 6-yard TD run, Steven Hauschka kick. Drive: 4 plays, 80 yards, 2:02. (HOU 17–7)
- HOU – 10:14 Neil Rackers 54-yard FG. Drive: 7 plays, 44 yards, 2:44. (HOU 20–7)
- DEN – 7:06 Steven Hauschka 27-yard FG. Drive: 7 plays, 71 yards, 3:08. (HOU 20–10)
- HOU – 2:34 Neil Rackers 57-yard FG. Drive: 8 plays, 42 yards, 4:32. (HOU 23–10)

**Fourth quarter**

- DEN – 10:55 Correll Buckhalter 23-yard TD pass from Tim Tebow, Steven Hauschka kick. Drive: 12 plays, 74 yards, 6:39. (HOU 23–17)
- DEN – 3:02 Tim Tebow 6-yard TD run, Steven Hauschka kick. Drive: 12 plays, 76 yards, 4:40. **(DEN 24–23)**

**Top passers**

- HOU – Matt Schaub: 23/33, 310 yards, 1 TD, 1 INT
- DEN – Tim Tebow: 16/29, 308 yards, 1 TD, 1 INT

**Top rushers**

- HOU – Arian Foster: 19 rushes, 91 yards, 1 TD
- DEN – Correll Buckhalter: 11 rushes, 42 yards, 1 TD

**Top receivers**

- HOU – Jacoby Jones: 5 receptions, 115 yards
- DEN – Brandon Lloyd: 5 receptions, 111 yards

**Top tacklers**

- HOU – Glover Quin: 8 tackles
- DEN – Brian Dawkins and Wesley Woodyard: 8 tackles and 1 assist each

Hoping to snap a five-game losing streak, the Broncos returned home for a game against the Houston Texans. In the first quarter, the Broncos trailed early, after a 3-yard touchdown run by Texans' running back Arian Foster, followed in the second quarter by a 3-yard touchdown pass from quarterback Matt Schaub to tight end Owen Daniels, and a 34-yard field goal by placekicker Neil Rackers, giving Houston a 17–0 halftime lead. The Broncos got on the board in the third quarter, with a 6-yard touchdown run by running back Correll Buckhalter, but the Texans responded, with a 54-yard field goal by Rackers. The Broncos cut into the Texans' lead, with a 27-yard field goal by placekicker Steven Hauschka, but a 57-yard field goal by Rackers gave Houston a 23–10 lead. In the fourth quarter, the Broncos staged a rally, with a 23-yard touchdown pass from quarterback Tim Tebow to Buckhalter, followed by Tebow scrambling for a 6-yard touchdown run, giving the Broncos a 24–23 lead with three minutes remaining. The Broncos' defense thwarted Houston's final drive.

==== Week 17: vs. San Diego Chargers ====
Week Seventeen: San Diego Chargers at Denver Broncos – Game summary

| Quarter | 1 | 2 | 3 | 4 | Total |
|---|---|---|---|---|---|
| **Chargers** | 0 | 16 | 10 | 7 | **33** |
| Broncos | 7 | 0 | 7 | 14 | **28** |

at INVESCO Field at Mile High, Denver, Colorado

- Date: January 2
- Game time: 2:15 pm. MST
- Game weather: 42 °F (6 °C), partly cloudy
- Game attendance: 74,155
- Referee: Walt Coleman
- TV announcers (CBS): Don Criqui and Steve Beuerlein
- Recap, Gamebook

Game information

**First quarter**

- DEN – 2:57 Brandon Lloyd 14-yard TD pass from Tim Tebow, Steven Hauschka kick. Drive: 6 plays, 40 yards, 2:42. (DEN 7–0)

**Second quarter**

- SD – 13:52 Ryan Mathews 27-yard TD run, Nate Kaeding kick. Drive: 8 plays, 76 yards, 4:05. (tied 7–7)
- SD – 9:59 Nate Kaeding 42-yard FG. Drive: 7 plays, 26 yards, 2:11. (SD 10–7)
- SD – 3:45 Nate Kaeding 45-yard FG. Drive: 10 plays, 56 yards, 5:05. (SD 13–7)
- SD – 0:09 Nate Kaeding 47-yard FG. Drive: 10 plays, 54 yards, 1:33. (SD 16–7)

**Third quarter**

- SD – 11:10 Ryan Mathews 12-yard TD run, Nate Kaeding kick. Drive: 5 plays, 71 yards, 2:34. (SD 23–7)
- SD – 8:31 Nate Kaeding 37-yard FG. Drive: 4 plays, 0:58. (SD 26–7)
- DEN – 3:15 Eric Decker 6-yard TD pass from Tim Tebow, Steven Hauschka kick. Drive: 11 plays, 83 yards, 5:16. (SD 26–14)

**Fourth quarter**

- SD – 7:55 Ryan Mathews 31-yard TD run, Nate Kaeding kick. Drive: 7 plays, 52 yards, 4:13. (SD 33–14)
- DEN – 7:42 Cassius Vaughn 97-yard kickoff return for a TD, Steven Hauschka kick. Drive: 0:13. (SD 33–21)
- DEN – 0:26 Tim Tebow 6-yard TD run, Steven Hauschka kick. Drive: 12 plays, 92 yards, 2:23. **(SD 33–28)**

**Top passers**

- SD – Philip Rivers: 21/37, 313 yards, 1 INT
- DEN – Tim Tebow: 16/36, 205 yards, 2 TD, 2 INT

**Top rushers**

- SD – Ryan Mathews: 26 rushes, 120 yards, 3 TD
- DEN – Tim Tebow: 13 rushes, 94 yards, 1 TD

**Top receivers**

- SD – Legedu Naanee: 4 receptions, 79 yards
- DEN – Brandon Lloyd: 5 receptions, 73 yards, 1 TD

**Top tacklers**

- SD – Kevin Burnett: 7 tackles, 1 assist
- DEN – Mario Haggan: 9 tackles

The Broncos' final game of the 2010 season was an AFC West divisional rematch with the San Diego Chargers. The Broncos took the lead in the first quarter, with a 14-yard touchdown pass from quarterback Tim Tebow to wide receiver Brandon Lloyd. However, the Chargers responded in the second quarter, with a 27-yard touchdown run by running back Ryan Mathews, followed by field goals from 42, 45 and 47 yards by placekicker Nate Kaeding. The Chargers added to their lead in the third quarter, with a 12-yard touchdown run by Mathews, followed by a 37-yard field goal by Kaeding. The Broncos narrowed San Diego's lead, with a 6-yard touchdown pass from Tebow to wide receiver Eric Decker, but was increased in the fourth quarter, with a 31-yard touchdown run by Mathews. Trailing 33–14 with 7:55 remaining in the game, the Broncos immediately responded, when kick returner Cassius Vaughn returned the ensuing kickoff 97 yards for a touchdown, followed by a 6-yard touchdown scramble by Tebow with 26 seconds remaining in the fourth quarter. Following Tebow's touchdown run, the Broncos recovered the onside kick, but two desperation hail mary passes by Tebow were unsuccessful, sealing the win for San Diego.

Notes

With the loss, the Broncos set a new franchise record for losses in a single season.

=== Standings ===
==== Division ====
AFC West
| | W | L | T | PCT | DIV | CONF | PF | PA | STK |
|---|---|---|---|---|---|---|---|---|---|
| ^{(4)} Kansas City Chiefs | 10 | 6 | 0 | .625 | 2–4 | 6–6 | 366 | 326 | L1 |
| San Diego Chargers | 9 | 7 | 0 | .563 | 3–3 | 7–5 | 441 | 322 | W1 |
| Oakland Raiders | 8 | 8 | 0 | .500 | 6–0 | 6–6 | 410 | 371 | W1 |
| Denver Broncos | 4 | 12 | 0 | .250 | 1–5 | 3–9 | 344 | 471 | L1 |

==== Conference ====
AFC
| # | Team | Division | W | L | T | PCT | DIV | CONF | SOS | SOV | STK |
|---|---|---|---|---|---|---|---|---|---|---|---|
**Division winners**
| 1 | New England Patriots | East | 14 | 2 | 0 | .875 | 5–1 | 10–2 | .504 | .504 | W8 |
| 2 (Note: Pittsburgh clinched the AFC North title instead of Baltimore based on division record (5–1 to Baltimore's 4–2).) | Pittsburgh Steelers | North | 12 | 4 | 0 | .750 | 5–1 | 9–3 | .500 | .417 | W2 |
| 3 (Note: Indianapolis clinched the AFC No. 3 seed instead of Kansas City based on a head-to-head victory.) | Indianapolis Colts | South | 10 | 6 | 0 | .625 | 4–2 | 8–4 | .473 | .425 | W4 |
| 4 | Kansas City Chiefs | West | 10 | 6 | 0 | .625 | 2–4 | 6–6 | .414 | .381 | L1 |
**Wild cards**
| 5 | Baltimore Ravens | North | 12 | 4 | 0 | .750 | 4–2 | 9–3 | .484 | .422 | W4 |
| 6 | New York Jets | East | 11 | 5 | 0 | .688 | 4–2 | 9–3 | .492 | .409 | W1 |
**Did not qualify for the postseason**
| 7 | San Diego Chargers | West | 9 | 7 | 0 | .563 | 3–3 | 7–5 | .457 | .410 | W1 |
| 8 (Note: Jacksonville finished ahead of Oakland based on head-to-head victory.) | Jacksonville Jaguars | South | 8 | 8 | 0 | .500 | 3–3 | 7–5 | .453 | .383 | L3 |
| 9 | Oakland Raiders | West | 8 | 8 | 0 | .500 | 6–0 | 6–6 | .469 | .469 | W1 |
| 10 | Miami Dolphins | East | 7 | 9 | 0 | .438 | 2–4 | 5–7 | .539 | .438 | L3 |
| 11 (Note: Houston finished ahead of Tennessee in the AFC South based on division record (3–3 to Tennessee's 2–4).) | Houston Texans | South | 6 | 10 | 0 | .375 | 3–3 | 5–7 | .523 | .500 | W1 |
| 12 | Tennessee Titans | South | 6 | 10 | 0 | .375 | 2–4 | 3–9 | .508 | .500 | L2 |
| 13 | Cleveland Browns | North | 5 | 11 | 0 | .313 | 1–5 | 3–9 | .570 | .475 | L4 |
| 14 (Note: Denver finished ahead of Buffalo and Cincinnati based on strength of victory.) | Denver Broncos | West | 4 | 12 | 0 | .250 | 1–5 | 3–9 | .516 | .453 | L1 |
| 15 (Note: Buffalo finished ahead of Cincinnati based on head-to-head victory.) | Buffalo Bills | East | 4 | 12 | 0 | .250 | 1–5 | 3–9 | .578 | .344 | L2 |
| 16 | Cincinnati Bengals | North | 4 | 12 | 0 | .250 | 2–4 | 3–9 | .582 | .438 | L1 |
**Tiebreakers** (Note: When breaking ties for three or more teams under the NFL's rules, they are first broken within divisions, then comparing only the highest ranked remaining team from each division.)

=== Statistics ===
==== Team leaders ====
| Category | Player(s) | Value |
|---|---|---|
| Passing yards | Kyle Orton | 3,653 |
| Passing touchdowns | Kyle Orton | 20 |
| Rushing yards | Knowshon Moreno | 779 |
| Rushing touchdowns | Tim Tebow | 6 |
| Receptions | Brandon Lloyd | 77 |
| Receiving yards | Brandon Lloyd | 1,448 * |
| Receiving touchdowns | Brandon Lloyd | 11 |
| Points | Matt Prater | 76 |
| Kickoff return yards | Eric Decker | 556 |
| Punt return yards | Eddie Royal | 298 |
| Tackles | D. J. Williams | 119 |
| Sacks | D. J. Williams | 5.5 |
| Forced fumbles | Perrish Cox; Brian Dawkins; Mario Haggan; Lance Ball | 2 |
| Interceptions | Champ Bailey; Renaldo Hill; Syd'Quan Thompson | 2 |

| * | Indicates league leader. |

Source for this section: Denver Broncos' official website.

==== League rankings ====
Offense
| Category | Value | NFL rank (out of 32) |
|---|---|---|
| Total yards | 348.9 YPG | 13th |
| Yards per play | 5.5 | 12th |
| Rushing yards | 96.5 YPG | 26th |
| Yards per rush | 3.9 | 24th |
| Passing yards | 252.4 YPG | 7th |
| Yards per pass | 7.4 | 8th |
| Scoring | 21.5 PPG | 19th |
| Pass completions | 334/580 (.576) | 25th |
| Third downs | 67/207 (.324) | 28th |
| Possession average | 28:09 | 28th |
| Fewest sacks allowed | 40 | T−23rd |
| Turnover differential | −9 | 28th |

Defense
| Category | Value | NFL rank (out of 32) |
|---|---|---|
| Total yards | 390.8 YPG | 32nd |
| Yards per play | 5.9 | 29th |
| Rushing yards | 154.6 YPG | 31st |
| Yards per rush | 4.7 | 28th |
| Passing yards | 236.2 YPG | 25th |
| Yards per pass | 7.8 | 30th |
| Scoring | 29.4 PPG | 32nd |
| Pass completions | 297/502 (.592) | 13th |
| Third downs | 80/209 (.383) | T−17th |
| Sacks | 23 | 32nd |
| Forced fumbles | 13 | T−19th |
| Fumble recoveries | 8 | T−24th |
| Interceptions | 10 | T−30th |

Special Teams
| Category | Value | NFL rank (out of 32) |
|---|---|---|
| Kickoff returns | 24.3 YPR | 7th |
| Punt returns | 10.4 YPR | 16th |
| Gross punting | 44.6 YPP | 10th |
| Net punting | 38.2 YPP | 22nd |
| Kickoff coverage | 24.7 YPR | 29th |
| Punt coverage | 11 YPR | 24th |

Source for this section: NFL.com.

== Awards and honors ==
| Recipient | Award(s) |
|---|---|
| Champ Bailey | Named to the All Fundamentals Team by the NFL Players Association; Named to the Pro Bowl roster for the tenth time in his career, setting a new NFL record for cornerbacks |
| Brandon Lloyd | Named to the AFC Pro Bowl team. Lloyd led the NFL with 1,448 receiving yards Voted to The Associated Press 2010 NFL All-Pro Team |
| Kyle Orton | Week 4: FedEx Air Player of the Week. Week 10: AFC Offensive Player of the Week |
| Tim Tebow | Week 10: Pepsi Rookie of the Week; Week 16: Pepsi Rookie of the Week |
| Wesley Woodyard | Named as the team's Walter Payton Man of the Year |

== Other news and notes ==
- On March 30, longtime placekicker Jason Elam, who spent his first 15 seasons with the Broncos (1993–2007) and his final two seasons with the Atlanta Falcons (2008–2009), signed a one-day contract in order to officially retire as a Bronco.
- On August 6, former Broncos' quarterback Brian Griese, who played with the Broncos from 1998 to 2002, was hired as the team's primary color commentator alongside play-by-play announcer Dave Logan on the team's radio network, 850 KOA (AM).
- On September 20, tragedy struck the Broncos' organization, when wide receiver Kenny McKinley was found dead in his Centennial, Colorado home of an apparent suicide, at the age of 23. The Denver Post later reported in December that McKinley had accumulated a large gambling debt prior to his death. McKinley was the team's 5th-round selection in the 2009 NFL draft.

=== Videotaping scandal ===
On November 27, one day before the team's 36–33 loss to the St. Louis Rams, media reports stated that the Broncos had come under investigation from the NFL, following a videotaping incident. The Denver Post reported that Steve Scarnecchia, the team's director of video operations hired by then-head coach Josh McDaniels in 2009, videotaped a San Francisco 49ers' walkthrough practice, prior to the teams' Week 8 International Series game at Wembley Stadium in London, England. Scarnecchia, the son of New England Patriots' former offensive line coach Dante Scarnecchia, worked in the Patriots' (2001–2004) and the New York Jets' (2006–2007) video departments prior to joining the Broncos in 2009. The Denver Post reported he was placed on a leave of absence by the team after the allegation came to light.

The same day, the NFL fined the Broncos and McDaniels $50,000 each, and Scarnecchia was fired as a result of the incident. Scarnecchia told NFL investigators he acted alone and "knew it was wrong" to tape the walkthrough practice, after the rest of the Broncos' staff had left the stadium. Scarnecchia later presented McDaniels with the six-minute video, but McDaniels declined to view it, and it was not shown to any other Broncos staff member, and therefore the NFL determined the Broncos had not gained a competitive advantage from it.

However, the NFL fined McDaniels due to the fact that he did not immediately report the incident to the league office, as required by policy. Team executives learned of the incident on November 8, and informed the NFL on November 16. NFL Security then began its investigation, which included a forensic analysis of the computer from which the recording was later deleted by Scarnecchia. The recording was retained by the league; in the case of the Patriots' prior incident, the league had destroyed all tapes received from the Patriots. The NFL also fined the Broncos, as "clubs are ultimately accountable for the conduct of their employees."

Scarnecchia had previously been cited for his role in the Patriots' videotaping scandal in 2007. The NFL determined that as a repeat offender of the NFL's "integrity of the game" policy, he was subject to a hearing on whether he should be banned from ever working in the NFL again. "A significant number" of Broncos' employees also certified in writing to the league that they were aware of no further incidents, but NFL commissioner Roger Goodell stated that if any more accusations came to light, he would re-open the investigation.
