= Brandon Lloyd =

American football player (born 1981)

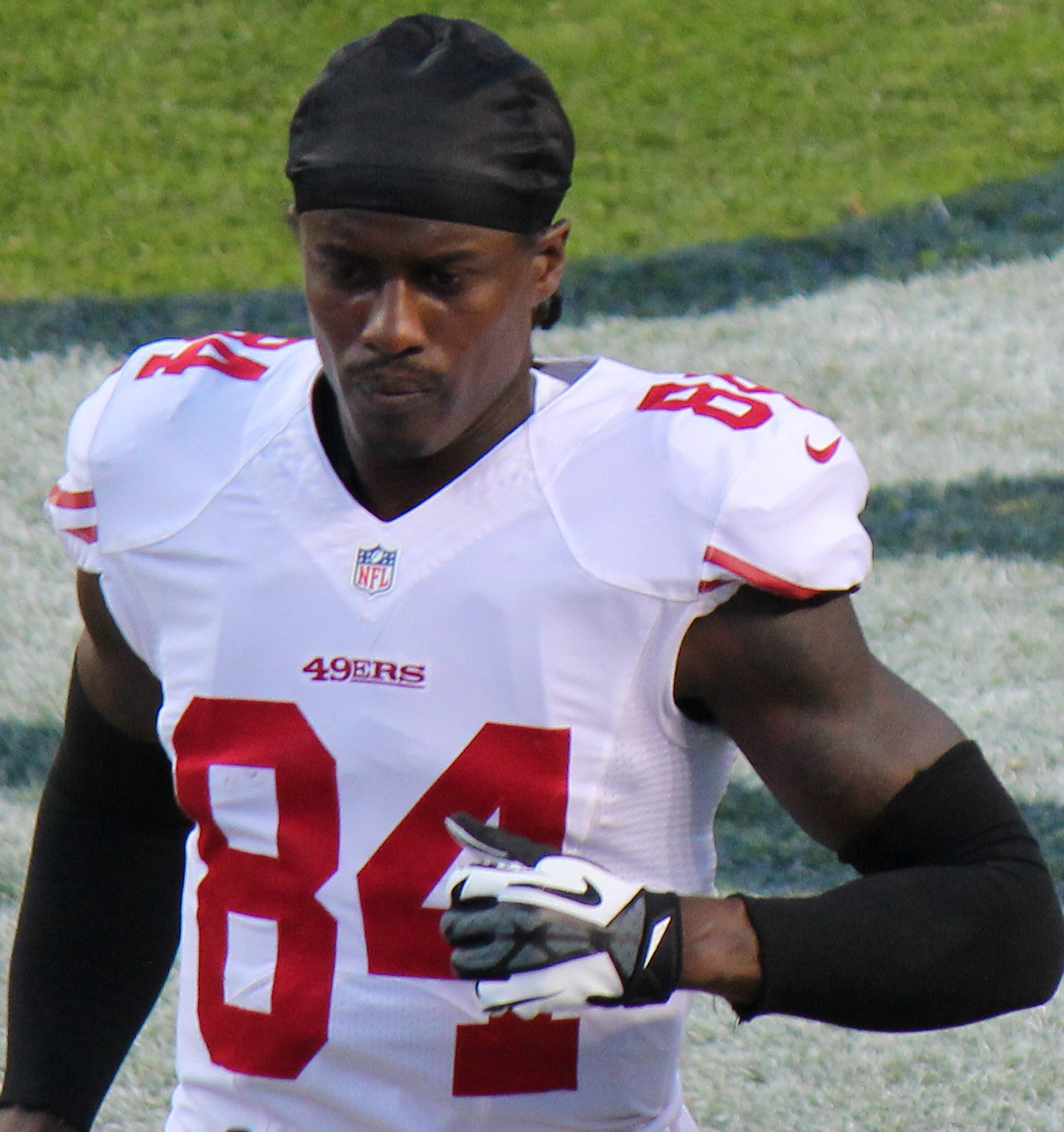
- Lloyd with the San Francisco 49ers in 2014

No. 85, 80, 84, 83
- Position: Wide receiver

Personal information
- Born: July 5, 1981 (age 45); Kansas City, Missouri, U.S.
- Listed height: 6 ft 0 in (1.83 m)
- Listed weight: 200 lb (91 kg)

Career information
- High school: Blue Springs (Blue Springs, Missouri)
- College: Illinois (1999–2002)
- NFL draft: 2003: 4th round, 124th overall pick

Career history
- San Francisco 49ers (2003–2005); Washington Redskins (2006–2007); Chicago Bears (2008); Denver Broncos (2009–2011); St. Louis Rams (2011); New England Patriots (2012); San Francisco 49ers (2014)

Awards and highlights
- Second-team All-Pro (2010); Pro Bowl (2010); NFL receiving yards leader (2010); 2× Second-team All-Big Ten (2001, 2002)

Career NFL statistics
- Receptions: 399
- Receiving yards: 5,989
- Receiving touchdowns: 36
- Stats at Pro Football Reference

Brandon Matthew Lloyd (born July 5, 1981) is an American former professional football player who was a wide receiver in the National Football League (NFL). He played college football for the Illinois Fighting Illini, and was selected by the San Francisco 49ers in the fourth round of the 2003 NFL draft. Lloyd also played for the Washington Redskins, Chicago Bears, Denver Broncos, St. Louis Rams and New England Patriots.

== College career ==
Lloyd attended the University of Illinois, and played for the Illinois Fighting Illini football team beginning in 1999. After a promising freshman season, Lloyd missed all of the 2000 season with a broken femur. He returned healthily and had outstanding seasons in both 2001 and 2002. He was a consensus first-team All-Big Ten performer after his sophomore season in 2001, helping lead the Fighting Illini to a 10–2 record and a BCS berth in the 2002 Sugar Bowl against LSU.

After his junior season in 2002, Lloyd declared his eligibility for the NFL draft. Of the seven children in the Lloyd family, he was the only one who started a career without finishing college. According to Brandon, "I saw [my mom] cry was when I told her I wasn't going back to school. She just thought that was the end of everything."

Lloyd finished his college career having the second-most receiving yards (2,835) and touchdown catches (31) in Illinois history, and ranking third in all-time receptions (160).

== Professional career ==
Pre-draft measurables
Height	Weight	Arm length	Hand span	40-yard dash	10-yard split	20-yard split	Vertical jump
6 ft 0 1/8 in (1.83 m)	184 lb (83 kg)	31 1/4 in (0.79 m)	9 in (0.23 m)	4.63 s	1.62 s	2.71 s	36.0 in (0.91 m)
All values from NFL Combine

=== San Francisco 49ers (first stint) ===
Lloyd was drafted in the fourth round of the 2003 NFL draft with the 124th overall pick by the San Francisco 49ers. In his first game, he blocked a punt against the Chicago Bears on September 7, 2003. On November 2, 2003, he caught his first touchdown pass against the St. Louis Rams. He finished the season with 14 receptions for 212 yards and 2 touchdowns.

In 2004, Lloyd started and appeared in 13 games and finished the season with 43 catches for 565 yards and six touchdowns.

During the 2005 season, Lloyd started 15 games and had 48 receptions for 733 yards and five touchdowns. In Week 3 against the Dallas Cowboys, he recorded four catches for 142 yards and two touchdowns, including an 89-yard touchdown catch.

=== Washington Redskins ===
On Saturday March 11, 2006, the San Francisco 49ers traded Lloyd to Washington Redskins in exchange for a third-round draft pick in the 2006 NFL draft and a fourth-round pick in the 2007 NFL draft. His first season in Washington is widely considered a failure, as he caught 23 passes for no touchdowns. According to Howard Bryant of the Washington Post, citing NFL.com, "Lloyd suffered through the worst season for a starting receiver in the Super Bowl era... No starting No. 2 wide receivers in the NFL started more games (12) while producing less (23 catches, 365 yards)."

Lloyd never made it out of Joe Gibbs' doghouse, due to a questionable attitude and alleged poor work ethic. Later, Lloyd admitted as much, that he was in fact disrespectful to the Hall of Fame head coach. On Sunday, November 4, 2007, Lloyd was listed among Redskins inactive as the team travelled to play against the New York Jets. Citing the reason behind the move, Gibbs said that Lloyd had been told to remain behind in Washington as disciplinary action for missing important team meetings. Lloyd would spend the latter part of the 2007 season on injured reserve after having snapped his collar bone while making a diving touchdown catch during team practice.

On February 26, 2008, the Redskins released Lloyd.

=== Chicago Bears ===
On March 7, 2008, Lloyd signed a one-year deal with the Chicago Bears after the release of Muhsin Muhammad and the loss of Bernard Berrian to free agency. The move reunited him with Bears offensive coordinator Ron Turner, who was Lloyd's head coach at the University of Illinois. Lloyd had a successful start to his career in Chicago, establishing himself as a favourite target of quarterback Kyle Orton, with 15 catches in his first four games. An injury forced him to miss several weeks, and he fell out of favour with the coaching staff as a result. He returned to the field in week 11. He finished the season with 26 receptions for 364 receiving yards and two receiving touchdowns in 11 games and five starts.

=== Denver Broncos ===
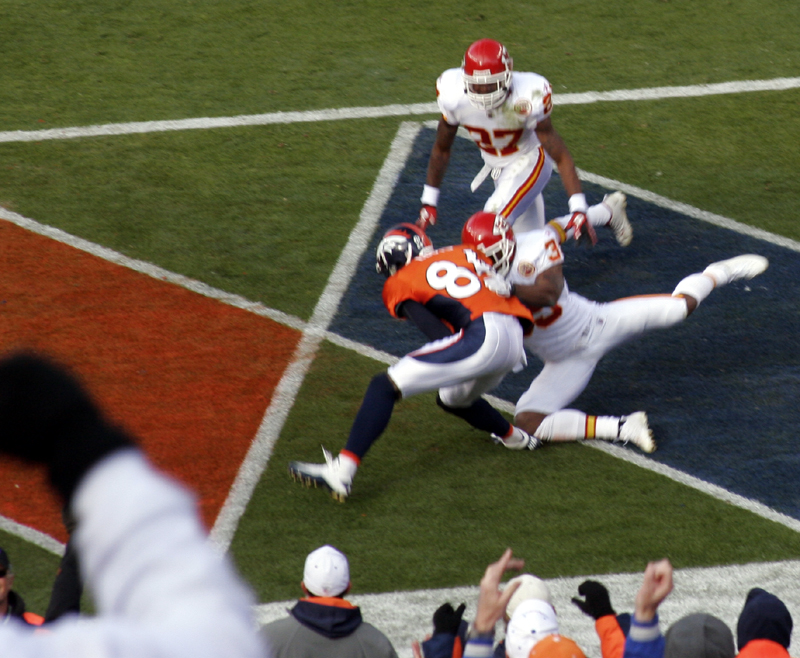
Lloyd catching a pass for a touchdown against the Kansas City Chiefs on November 14, 2010.

Lloyd's contract with the Chicago Bears expired after the end of the 2008 season. In early April, Bears quarterback Kyle Orton was traded to the Denver Broncos in a deal involving Jay Cutler. As the offseason progressed, the Bears did not make any efforts to re-sign Lloyd. Lloyd signed with the Broncos on June 15, 2009. Lloyd re-signed with the Broncos on March 15, 2010.

During the Broncos' 24–20 loss to the Jets on October 17, Lloyd was subjected to a helmet-to-helmet tackle/hit by New York safety Jim Leonhard, resulting in a 15-yard penalty. This hit, along with several other helmet-to-helmet hits during NFL games that weekend, led the league to announce such future 'devastating hits' or 'head shots' will be met with possible suspensions even for first-time offenders, a significant change in league policy, especially during an ongoing season.

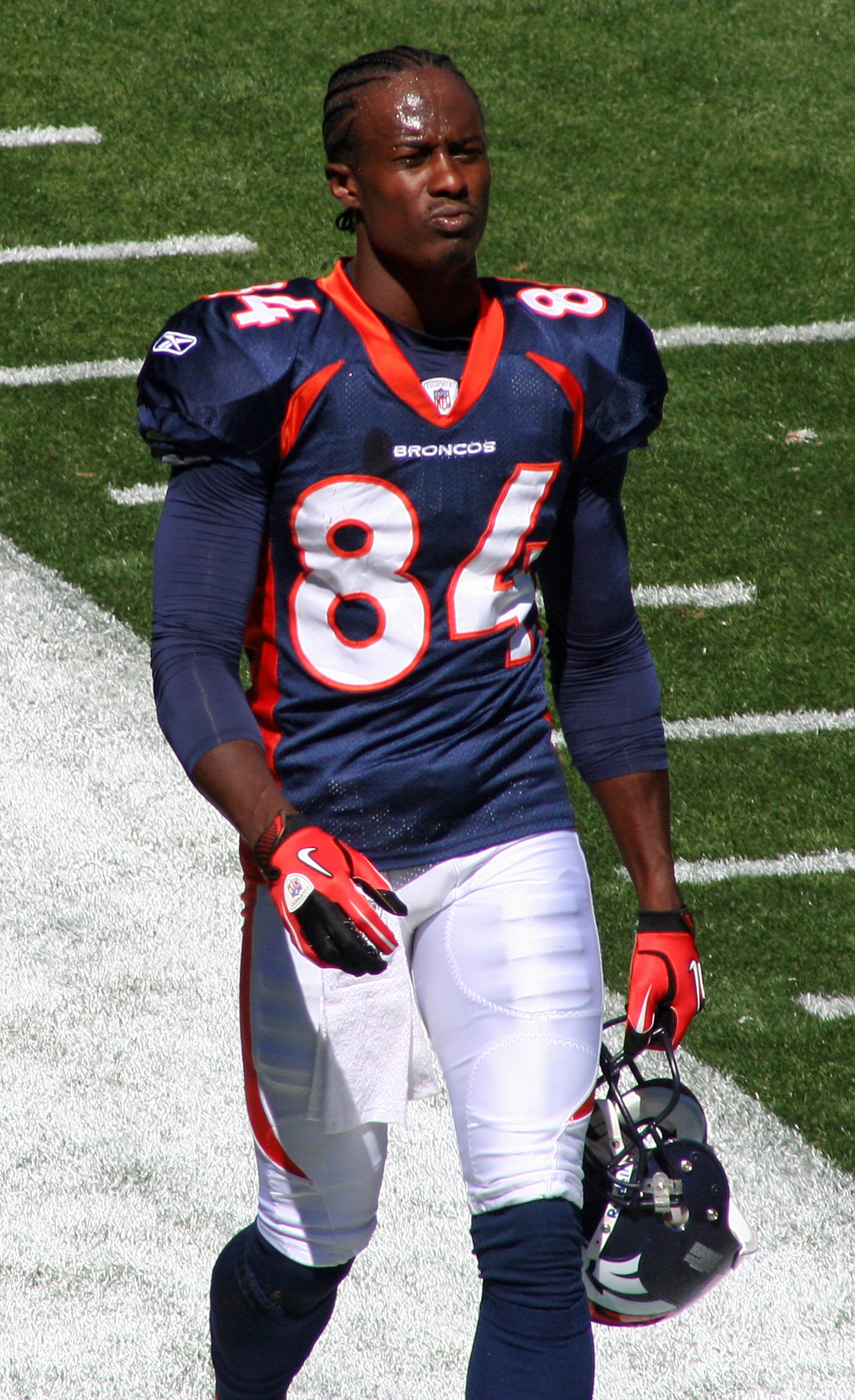
Lloyd with the Broncos in 2010

He led the NFL in receiving yards with 1,448 yards for the 2010 season. He was also named 2nd Team All-Pro and invited to the 2011 Pro Bowl. He was ranked 58th by his fellow players on the NFL Top 100 Players of 2011.

=== St. Louis Rams ===
On October 17, 2011, Lloyd was traded to the St. Louis Rams. He finished the season with a total of 70 catches, 51 with the Rams. The Rams gave up a conditional sixth-round pick that was upgraded to a fifth-round pick because Lloyd ended up having 30 receptions.

=== New England Patriots ===
On March 17, 2012, Lloyd signed a three-year deal with the New England Patriots. This deal reunited Lloyd with Josh McDaniels, his coach in Denver and Offensive Coordinator with the Rams. In Week 4, he scored his first touchdown as a Patriot in arguably the most famous catch of his career. In Week 8, he faced the St. Louis Rams, his former team, in London. He finished the game with two receptions, both for touchdowns, in the 45–7 victory. He finished the season with 74 catches for 911 yards and four touchdowns. He was released by the Patriots on March 16, 2013.

=== San Francisco 49ers (second stint) ===
After taking a year off from football, Lloyd signed a one-year deal with the 49ers on April 15, 2014. In the 2014 season, he would record 14 receptions for 294 yards and one touchdown.

=== Retirement ===
On October 22, 2015, Lloyd announced his retirement from professional football.

== NFL career statistics ==
Legend
	Led the league
**Bold**	Career high

Year	Team	GP	Receiving							Fumbles	
Year	Team	GP	Rec	Tgt	Yds	Avg	Lng	TD	FD	Fum	Lost
2003	SF	**16**	14	30	212	15.1	44	2	9	0	0
2004	SF	13	43	89	565	13.1	52	6	26	0	0
2005	SF	**16**	48	109	733	15.3	**89**	5	34	**1**	**1**
2006	WAS	15	23	57	365	15.9	52	0	15	**1**	**1**
2007	WAS	8	2	11	14	7.0	9	0	0	0	0
2008	CHI	11	26	50	364	14.0	32	2	17	0	0
2009	DEN	2	8	18	117	14.6	44	0	5	0	0
2010	DEN	**16**	**77**	**153**	**1,448**	18.8	71	**11**	**72**	0	0
2011	DEN	4	19	31	283	14.9	44	0	15	**1**	0
2011	STL	11	51	117	683	13.4	37	5	31	**1**	0
2012	NE	**16**	74	131	911	12.3	53	4	50	0	0
2014	SF	14	14	35	294	**21.0**	80	1	9	0	0
Total		142	399	831	5,989	15.0	89	36	285	4	2

== Music career ==
In addition to his football career, Lloyd has recorded music and attempted to launch a career as a rapper. In 2008 his single "She All Mine" made the Billboard R&B chart, and his song "Heavy" was featured on the Spike TV show Blue Mountain State. His single "Take It To The Hoop" is featured on NBA Ballers 2. Lloyd has received criticism for trying to balance careers in football and rap, but he says that making music is important to expressing who he really is. Quoted in a 2011 article, Lloyd said, "I have the guts to stand out and do something I'm passionate about, go against the grain and go against the conventional wisdom that the athlete-rap thing is unsuccessful. Yet I'm going to do it. People will say: 'Oh, you're doing hip-hop music? Who does he think he is, a rapper? He's trying to be someone he's not.' When in reality, I'd be someone I'm not by not expressing myself in music."

== Acting career ==
Lloyd appeared in the direct-to-DVD film After Effect, alongside Daniel Baldwin. Lloyd had one speaking line, and less than a minute of screen time. The film was available online starting October 28, 2013.
