= Eric Studesville =

American football player and coach (born 1967)

Chicago Bears
- Title: Running backs coach

Personal information
- Born: May 29, 1967 (age 59); Madison, Wisconsin, U.S.

Career information
- Position: Defensive back
- High school: Verona (WI)
- College: Wisconsin–Whitewater
- NFL draft: 1989: undrafted

Career history
- Arizona (1991) Graduate assistant; North Carolina (1992–1993) Video coordinator & assistant secondary coach; Wingate (1994) Defensive coordinator; Kent State (1995–1996) Defensive coordinator; Chicago Bears (1997–2000); Offensive quality control coach & offensive assistant (1997–1998); Wide receivers coach & assistant special teams coach (1999–2000); New York Giants (2001–2003) Running backs coach; Buffalo Bills (2004–2009); Running backs coach (2004–2007); Running game coordinator & running backs coach (2008–2009); Denver Broncos (2010–2016); Running backs coach (2010); Interim head coach (2010); Running backs coach (2011–2016); Miami Dolphins (2017–2025); Running backs coach & run game coordinator (2017–2020); Co-offensive coordinator & running backs coach (2021); Associate head coach & running backs coach (2022–2025); Chicago Bears (2026–present) Running backs coach

Awards and highlights
- Super Bowl champion (50)

Head coaching record
- Regular season: 1–3 (.250)
- Coaching profile at Pro Football Reference

Eric Studesville (born May 29, 1967) is an American football coach who is the current running backs coach for the Chicago Bears of the National Football League (NFL). Studesville is known as the former run game coordinator for the Buffalo Bills and interim head coach of the Denver Broncos, a position he held for four weeks in December 2010. He replaced Josh McDaniels after 12 games in the 2010 NFL season, after which he resumed his primary role as running backs coach under head coaches John Fox, Gary Kubiak, and Vance Joseph from 2011–2017. He was the first African American head coach in Broncos history, albeit on an interim basis. Studesville has been to the Super Bowl twice, both as a member of the Broncos personnel, losing in 2014 and winning in 2016.

During his tenure is Miami, Studesville has served as an assistant coach for the Miami Dolphins under head coaches Adam Gase, Brian Flores, and Mike McDaniel, primarily as the running backs coach and was promoted to associate head coach in 2022.

== College career ==
Studesville played defensive back at the University of Wisconsin–Whitewater.

== Coaching career ==
=== College ===
Studesville began his coaching career in 1991 being the Assistant Graduate Coach for the University of Arizona.

In 1992, Studesville became the video coordinator for the University of North Carolina where he would work with the secondary coach until the end of the 1993 season.

In 1994, Studesville became the defensive coordinator for Wingate University where his defense would allow only 15.7 points a game and help the bulldogs have an 8–2 record in the regular season and make it to the third round of the playoffs.

In 1995, Studesville became the defensive coordinator for Kent State University where he would remain the defensive coordinator until the end of the 1996 season.

=== Chicago Bears ===
In 1997, Studesville became an NFL coach for the Chicago Bears as a quality control coach. He would remain in Chicago until the end of the 2000 season.

=== New York Giants ===
In 2001, Studesville was hired as the New York Giants running backs coach under head coach Jim Fassel. A season prior to Studesville's arrival, the Giants appeared in Super Bowl XXXV, in which they lost to the Baltimore Ravens 7–34. There, he guided running back Tiki Barber to three consecutive 1,000 yard rushing seasons and paved the way for Barber to become one of the best offensive weapons for the Giants in the coming years. In 2002, Barber recorded 1,554 rushing yards which was not only a career high for the running back, but the second-most total in Giants franchise history. Studesville was not retained under new head coach Tom Coughlin.

=== Buffalo Bills ===
After a coaching change with the Giants in 2004 he joined the Buffalo Bills coaching staff as the running backs coach under offensive coordinator Tom Clements. The Bills would finish the season 9–7, their last winning record until the 2014 season, by scoring 24.6 points a game, with Bills running backs 13th in the NFL in rushing. Studesville is largely given credit for the emergence of Willis McGahee, who, after recovering from a catastrophic knee injury sustained in college, gained 1297 yards from scrimmage. In 2005, the running game was the main highlight of an otherwise stagnant team led by journeyman Kelly Holcomb and 2nd year quarterback J. P. Losman, as the Bills finished 5–11 while McGahee gained 1,425 yards from scrimmage. In 2006, Mularkey was fired and Dick Jauron was brought on to replace him; Jauron would keep Studesville as the team's running backs coach under offensive coordinator Steve Fairchild. After a pedestrian year for the Bills rushing attack spearheaded by Willis McGahee and Anthony Thomas in 2006 (the same year that Division III Coe College product Fred Jackson was recruited to the Bills by its then-general manager and fellow alum Marv Levy and remained on the practice squad that season), in 2007, the Bills drafted Marshawn Lynch who gained 1299 yards in his rookie season under Studesville's tutelage. 2007 also saw Jackson's call-up from the practice squad and emergence as a threat, as he played in 8 games and gained nearly 500 yards from scrimmage while maintaining a special teams role as well. 2008, under new offensive coordinator Turk Schonert, the Bills offense experienced a renewed commitment to its running backs and Studesville pupils Lynch and Jackson combined for 2,224 yards from scrimmage.

2009 brought about an unsettled year for the Bills offense, as Schonert was fired midway through training camp with former Bills quarterback and quarterbacks coach Alex Van Pelt being appointed in his stead. Studesville's charges saw a reversal of fortunes, as Lynch experienced injuries and off-the-field troubles leading to a suspension, and Jackson led the way with 1,433 yards from scrimmage as they combined for a total of 2,062 between Jackson and Lynch. Jauron was fired midway through the season and replaced by interim head coach Perry Fewell for the remainder of the season.

The entire Bills staff was let go following the 2009 season. Studesville would not be retained under new head coach Chan Gailey.

=== Denver Broncos ===
In January 2010, Studesville was hired by the Denver Broncos as the running backs coach under head coach Josh McDaniels.

On December 6, 2010, following a 3–9 start to the season, coach McDaniels was fired by owner Pat Bowlen and Studesville was named the interim head coach in his place. However, the choice of Studesville to replace McDaniels was viewed by some as a surprise. Studesville held the interim head coaching position for the final four games of the 2010 season, during which the team went 1–3, and Studesville started rookie quarterback Tim Tebow in weeks 15–17. Studesville recorded his first win as a head coach on December 26, 2010, when the Broncos defeated the Houston Texans 24–23, a team led by future Broncos head coach Gary Kubiak.

On February 7, 2016, Studesville was part of the Broncos coaching staff that won Super Bowl 50. In the game, the Broncos defeated the Carolina Panthers by a score of 24–10.

On January 1, 2018, Studesville was released by the Broncos. Studesville had retained his position as Denver's running backs coach under four different head coaches: McDaniels, John Fox, Gary Kubiak, and Vance Joseph.

=== Miami Dolphins ===
On January 17, 2018, the Miami Dolphins hired Studesville as running backs coach under head coach Adam Gase, whom Studesville worked alongside at the Broncos from 2010–2014. The team announced on February 8, 2019, that they were retaining Studesville as the team's running backs coach despite the firing of Adam Gase as head coach and the hiring of Brian Flores in that role. Studesville received an additional title of co-offensive coordinator on March 11, 2021. Despite the Dolphins' struggles for much of Studesville's tenure, he has survived three coaching changes (Gase, Flores, and Mike McDaniel).

=== Chicago Bears (second stint) ===
On February 18, 2026, the Bears hired Studesville as their running back coach under head coach Ben Johnson. Studesville and Johnson worked together in Miami during the 2017 and 2018 seasons.

== Personal life ==
Studesville is the son of Alphonse and Janet Studesville.

== Head coaching record ==
Team	Year	Regular season					Postseason			
Team	Year	Won	Lost	Tied	Win %	Finish	Won	Lost	Win %	Result
DEN	2010	1	3	0	.250	4th in AFC West	–	–	–	–
DEN Total		1	3	0	.250		–	–	–	–
