= 2007 Kentucky Wildcats football team =

American college football season

2007 Kentucky Wildcats football

Music City Bowl champion

Music City Bowl, W 35–28 vs. Florida State
- Conference: Southeastern Conference
- Eastern Division
- Record: 8–5 (3–5 SEC)
- Head coach: Rich Brooks (5th season)
- Offensive coordinator: Joker Phillips (3rd season)
- Offensive scheme: Pro-style
- Defensive coordinator: Steve Brown (1st season)
- Base defense: 4–3
- Home stadium: Commonwealth Stadium

2007 Southeastern Conference football standings
	Conf.			Overall
Team	W		L	W		L
Eastern Division
No. 12 Tennessee xy	6	–	2	10	–	4
No. 2 Georgia x%	6	–	2	11	–	2
No. 13 Florida	5	–	3	9	–	4
South Carolina	3	–	5	6	–	6
Kentucky	3	–	5	8	–	5
Vanderbilt	2	–	6	5	–	7
Western Division
No. 1 LSU x$#	6	–	2	12	–	2
No. 15 Auburn	5	–	3	9	–	4
Arkansas	4	–	4	8	–	5
Mississippi State	4	–	4	8	–	5
Alabama	4	–	4	7	–	6
Ole Miss	0	–	8	3	–	9
Championship: LSU 21, Tennessee 14
# – BCS National Champion; $ – BCS representative as conference champion; % – BCS at-large representative; x – Division champion/co-champions; y – Championship game participant; Alabama had 5 victories vacated by the NCAA in 2010. As such, the official record for Alabama is 2–6 (1–4).; Rankings from AP Poll

The 2007 Kentucky Wildcats football team represented the University of Kentucky in the college football season of 2007–2008. The team's head football coach was Rich Brooks, in his 5th year as Kentucky's head coach. The Wildcats played their home games at Commonwealth Stadium in Lexington, Kentucky. The team is remembered by many college football fans for its prolific offense, led by seniors Rafael Little, Keenan Burton, Stevie Johnson, and André Woodson.

== Schedule ==
Date	Time	Opponent	Rank	Site	TV	Result	Attendance
September 1	6:00 pm	Eastern Kentucky*		Commonwealth Stadium; Lexington, KY	BBSN	W 50–10	66,512
September 8	6:00 pm	Kent State*		Commonwealth Stadium; Lexington, KY	BBSN	W 56–20	67,380
September 15	6:00 pm	No. 9 Louisville*		Commonwealth Stadium; Lexington, KY (Battle for the Governor's Cup)	ESPNC	W 40–34	68,857
September 22	7:00 pm	at Arkansas	No. 21	Donald W. Reynolds Razorback Stadium; Fayetteville, AR	ESPN2	W 42–29	74,015
September 29	1:00 pm	Florida Atlantic*	No. 14	Commonwealth Stadium; Lexington, KY	BBSN	W 45–17	61,927
October 4	8:00 pm	at No. 11 South Carolina	No. 8	Williams-Brice Stadium; Columbia, SC	ESPN	L 23–38	76,220
October 13	3:30 pm	No. 1 LSU	No. 17	Commonwealth Stadium; Lexington, KY	CBS	W 43–37 ^{3OT}	70,902
October 20	3:30 pm	No. 14 Florida	No. 8	Commonwealth Stadium; Lexington, KY (College GameDay) (rivalry)	CBS	L 37–45	71,024
October 27	12:00 pm	Mississippi State^{†}	No. 14	Commonwealth Stadium; Lexington, KY	LFS	L 14–31	64,173
November 10	3:00 pm	at Vanderbilt	No. 24	Vanderbilt Stadium; Nashville, TN (rivalry)	BBSN	W 27–20	39,773
November 17	12:00 pm	at No. 8 Georgia	No. 22	Sanford Stadium; Athens, GA	LFS	L 13–24	92,746
November 24	3:30 pm	No. 19 Tennessee		Commonwealth Stadium; Lexington, KY (Battle for the Barrel/Senior Day)	CBS	L 50–52 ^{4OT}	64,813
December 31	4:00 pm	vs. Florida State*		LP Field; Nashville, TN (Music City Bowl)	ESPN	W 35–28	62,661
*Non-conference game; ^{†}Homecoming; Rankings from AP Poll released prior to the game; All times are in Eastern time

== Game summaries ==
=== Eastern Kentucky ===
	1	2	3	4	Total
Colonels	0	3	7	0	10
Wildcats	17	13	20	0	50

André Woodson threw for a 51-yard touchdown on Kentucky's first snap of the season, as the Wildcats rout Eastern Kentucky, 50–10. Kentucky scored five touchdowns on their first eight drives, and punted only once, in the fourth quarter. Rafael Little had 135 yards on the ground for Kentucky.

=== Kent State ===
	1	2	3	4	Total
Golden Flashes	7	7	6	0	20
Wildcats	14	0	21	21	56

Kentucky had 266 yards and six touchdowns on the ground, but Kentucky's porous run defense was gashed for 324 yards on the ground by the Golden Flashes. Woodson looked out of sync until he hit Keenan Burton for a fifty-one yard score in the third quarter. Tony Dixon, André Woodson, Alfonso Smith, and Derrick Locke all had one rushing touchdown for Kentucky, where John Conner had two.

Kent State struck first on a fake field goal, ran six yards for a touchdown by holder Leneric Muldrow. Conner ran in from five yards out, and Woodson fired back with a 33-yard touchdown pass to give the Wildcats a 14–7 lead. The Golden Flashes Eugene Jarvis scored on a ten-yard run up the middle, but John Conner and Tony Dixon ran in, and André Woodson hit Keenan Burton to the right for 51 yards and a touchdown. Kent State, down 14–35 answered with a Julian Edelman pass to Eugene Jarvis for a 22-yard touchdown, but Woodson, Alfonso Smith, and Derrick Locke ran in for touchdowns of 1, 12, and 67 yards respectively.

=== No. 9 Louisville ===
	1	2	3	4	Total
No. 9 Cardinals	7	14	7	6	34
Wildcats	13	6	7	14	40

With 28 seconds left, André Woodson threw a 57-yard touchdown pass to Stevie Johnson to knock off #9 Louisville, the first time the Wildcats had beaten a top ten team in thirty years. Woodson finished 30 of 44 for 275 yds and four touchdowns. Woodson also did not throw an interception, and he ended the game with 257 passes without an interception. This became a new SEC record, breaking David Greene's record and falling fourteen attempts short of Trent Dilfer's all-time mark.

Placekicker Lones Seiber started the scoring for the Wildcats with a 36-yard field goal, and Woodson followed later with a five-yard touchdown strike, with another Seiber kick, to make the lead 13–0 in favor of Kentucky. Louisville Senior Quarterback Brian Brohm found Anthony Allen for an eight-yard touchdown. Rafael Little ran up the middle for a ten-yard score in the second quarter, but Seiber missed the PAT, resulting in a 19–7 Kentucky lead. Brian Brohm passed to Harry Douglas for a TD, and Louisville added a ten-yard touchdown run from Anthony Allen to pull in front 21–19.

Opening the second-half scoring, Woodson threw a seven-yard touchdown pass but on the ensuing kickoff lightning struck for the Cardinals in the form of Trent Guy's 100-yard kickoff return. Once again, Kentucky answered with a Woodson pass to Jacob Tamme. Brohm then began an 84-yard drive that ended in Anthony Allen's 2-yard touchdown run and a Cardinal lead. Brohm would've been sacked for a loss on the drive, but a fifteen-yard personal foul penalty on cornerback Trevard Lindley gave the Cardinals room to operate as well as a fresh set of downs. Despite Brohm's heroics, they were topped by Woodson's 57-yard touchdown hookup to wideout Steve Johnson to beat the Cardinals for the first time in Kentucky's last five tries. This was the first time Woodson had gotten a win against Brohm, Woodson's rival dating back to their high schools, separated by only 45 miles.

=== At Arkansas ===
	1	2	3	4	Total
No. 19 Wildcats	7	7	7	21	42
Razorbacks	10	10	0	9	29

=== Florida Atlantic ===
	1	2	3	4	Total
Owls	3	7	0	7	17
No. 15 Wildcats	7	21	7	10	45

Andre Woodson threw his first interception in his previous 325 attempts, snapping his NCAA record for consecutive passes thrown without an INT.

=== At No. 6 South Carolina ===
	1	2	3	4	Total
No. 8 Wildcats	3	7	3	10	23
No. 6 Gamecocks	10	7	7	14	38

=== At No. 1 LSU ===
	1	2	3	4	OT	2OT	3OT	Total
No. 1 Tigers	0	17	10	0	7	3	0	37
No. 15 Wildcats	7	7	7	6	7	3	6	43

=== No. 14 Florida ===
	1	2	3	4	Total
No. 14 Gators	14	7	10	14	45
No. 8 Wildcats	7	3	14	13	37

=== Mississippi State ===
	1	2	3	4	Total
Bulldogs	7	7	10	7	31
No. 14 Wildcats	7	0	7	0	14

=== At Vanderbilt ===
	1	2	3	4	Total
No. 24 Wildcats	3	10	7	7	27
Commodores	0	13	0	7	20

=== At No. 8 Georgia ===
	1	2	3	4	Total
No. 22 Wildcats	10	0	3	0	13
No. 8 Bulldogs	0	7	14	3	24

=== No. 19 Tennessee ===
	1	2	3	4	OT	2OT	3OT	4OT	Total
No. 19 Volunteers	14	10	7	0	7	0	6	8	52
Wildcats	0	7	14	10	7	0	6	6	50

=== Vs. Florida State (Music City Bowl) ===
	1	2	3	4	Total
Wildcats	7	7	14	7	35
Seminoles	7	7	0	14	28

== Statistics ==
Quarterback Andre Woodson set a new NCAA record with 325 consecutive pass attempts without an interception. His 40 touchdown passes set a new SEC record, and his 81 career touchdown passes set a new school record.

=== Team ===
	Team	Opp
Scoring	475	385
Points per game	36.5	29.6
First downs	335	288
Rushing	130	140
Passing	182	129
Penalty	23	19
Total offense	5764	5163
Avg per play	5.7	5.3
Avg per game	443.4	397.2
Fumbles-Lost	30-16	24-10
Penalties-Yards	83-717	84-737
Avg per game	55.1	56.6

	Team	Opp
Punts-Yards	51-1992	65-2558
Avg per punt	39.1	39.3
Time of possession/Game	28:31	31:29
3rd down conversions	94/195	88/194
4th down conversions	12/22	7/17
Touchdowns scored	62	45
Field goals-Attempts-Long		
PAT-Attempts		
Attendance		
Games/Avg per Game		

== Weekly rankings ==
Ranking movements Legend: ██ Increase in ranking ██ Decrease in ranking — = Not ranked
	Week															
Poll	Pre	1	2	3	4	5	6	7	8	9	10	11	12	13	14	Final
AP	—	—	—	21	14	8	17	8	14	—	25	22	—	—	—	—
Coaches	—	—	—	23	15	8	23	13	15	23	22	20	—	—	—	—
Harris	Not released				14	7	18	11	15	24	23	20	21	—	—	Not released
BCS	Not released							7	14	—	25	—	—	—	—	Not released

== Depth chart ==
Starters

Position	Number	Name	Height	Weight	Class	Hometown	Games↑
QB	**3**	**Andre' Woodson**	**6'5"**	**230 lb.**	**Sr.**	**Radcliff, Kentucky**	**13**
HB	**22**	**Rafael Little**	**5'10"**	**210 lb.**	**Sr.**	**Anderson, South Carolina**	**10**
FB	38	John Conner	5'11"	228	So.	West Chester, Ohio	13
WR	**19**	**Keenan Burton**	**6'2"**	**195 lb.**	**Sr.**	**Louisville, Kentucky**	**12**
WR	13	Stevie Johnson	6'3"	198 lb.	Sr.	San Francisco, California	10
TE	**18**	**Jacob Tamme**	**6'4"**	**215 lb.**	**Sr.**	**Danville, Kentucky**	**13**
LT	**79**	**Garry Williams**	**6'0"**	**300 lb.**	**Jr.**	**Louisville, Kentucky**	**13**
LG	72	Zipp Duncan	6'5"	295 lb.	So.	Magnolia, Kentucky	12
C	59	Eric Scott	6'5"	291 lb.	Sr.	Woodstock, Georgia	13
RG	**78**	**Christian Johnson**	**6'4"**	325 lb.	Jr.	Fort Campbell, Kentucky	13
RT	**76**	**Justin Jeffries**	**6'6"**	**300 lb.**	**So.**	**Louisville, Kentucky**	**13**

Position	Number	Name	Height	Weight	Class	Hometown	Games↑
LE	**99**	**Jeremy Jarmon**	**6'3"**	**277 lb.**	**So.**	**Collierville, Tennessee**	**13**
LT	**98**	**Myron Pryor**	**6'1"**	**310 lb.**	**So.**	**Louisville, Kentucky**	**12**
RT	91	**Corey Peters**	**6'3"**	**290 lb.**	**So.**	**Louisville, Kentucky**	**13**
RE	**95**	**Ventrell Jenkins**	**6'2"**	**285 lb.**	**Jr.**	**Columbia, South Carolina**	**11**
SLB	**16**	**Wesley Woodyard**	**6'1"**	**225 lb.**	**Sr.**	**LaGrange, Georgia**	**13**
MLB	**56**	**Braxton Kelley**	**6'0"**	**230 lb.**	**Jr.**	**LaGrange, Georgia**	**12**
WLB	**51**	**Johnny Williams**	**6'3"**	**244 lb.**	**Jr.**	**Jacksonville, Florida**	**12**
RCB	**32**	**Trevard Lindley**	**6'0"**	**175 lb.**	**So.**	**Hiram, Georgia**	**13**
LCB	34	Paul Warford	5'10"	200 lb.	So.	Richmond, Kentucky	10
FS	**35**	**Roger Williams**	**6'0"**	**204 lb.**	**Sr.**	**Rockmart, Georgia**	**13**
SS	**2**	**Marcus McClinton**	**6'1"**	**210 lb.**	**Jr.**	**Fort Campbell, Kentucky**	**11**

- **bold** - Denotes returning starter
- ↑ - Denotes number of games started by the player at the listed position during the 2008 season.

== Roster ==
2007 Kentucky Wildcats football team roster
Players
Coaches
Offense

Pos.	#	Name	Class
QB	1	Will Fidler	Fr
QB	3	Andre' Woodson	Sr
QB	5	Mike Hartline	Fr
WR	7	David Jones	Sr
WR	8	DeMoreo Ford	So
RB	9	Brandon Jackson	Fr
QB	10	Matt Lentz	Fr
WR	12	Dicky Lyons, Jr.	Jr
WR	13	Steve Johnson, Jr.	Sr
WR	14	Anthony Mosley	Fr
QB	15	Curtis Pulley	Jr
TE	18	Jacob Tamme	Sr
WR	19	Keenan Burton	Sr
RB	22	Rafael Little	Sr
WR	26	Terrence Jones	So
RB	28	Tony Dixon	Sr
RB	29	Alfonso Smith	Jr
RB	30	Moncell Allen	Fr
RB	33	Antoine Brown	Jr
RB	37	Trey Bowland	So
FB	38	John Conner	Jr
FB	40	Maurice Grinter	Jr
RB	41	Derrick Locke	So
FB	43	Stephen Ball	So
FB	47	Matt Ramsey	So
WR	48	Jayce Long	So
OL	52	Billy Joe Murphy	Fr
OL	58	Phillip Hibbard	Fr
OL	60	Dustin Luck	Jr
C	61	Jorge Gonzalez	Jr
OL	63	Jake Lanefski	Fr
OT	64	Josh Winchell	Fr
OL	68	Michael Williams	Jr
OL	70	Stuart Hines	Fr
OT	72	Zipp Duncan	Jr
G	73	Jess Beets	Fr
OT	74	Joe Fischer	Sr
OL	75	Brad Durham	Fr
OT	76	Justin Jeffries	Jr
OL	77	Marcus Davis	So
OL	78	Christian Johnson	Sr
OT	79	Garry Williams	Sr
TE	80	T. C. Drake	Jr
WR	81	Kyrus Lanxter	Fr
TE	82	Tyler Sexton	Jr
WR	83	Courtney Gholston	So
WR	83	Anthony Stewart	Sr
WR	84	Chris Wraley	Jr
WR	85	Anthony Cecil	Jr
TE	86	Ross Bogue	Jr
WR	87	Andre Henderson	So
TE	88	Chris Goode	So

Defense

Pos.	#	Name	Class
DB	2	Marcus McClinton	Sr
LB	4	Micah Johnson	Jr
DB	6	Taiedo Smith	Fr
DB	11	Greg Wilson	Fr
DB	15	Chris Drayton	Fr
LB	16	Wesley Woodyard	Sr
DB	21	Michael Schwindel	Jr
DB	23	Shomari Moore	Sr
DB	24	Randall Burden	Fr
DB	25	Ahmad Grigsby, Jr.	So
DB	26	Martin McPherson,	Sr
DB	27	Ashton Cobb	Jr
DB	31	Jordan Nevels	Jr
DB	32	Trevard Lindley	So
DB	33	Calvin Harrison	Jr
DB	34	Paul Warford	Jr
CB	36	Robbie McAtee	Sr
DE	39	Courtney Coffey	So
DB	40	Daryl Faulkner	So
LB	41	Ben Bates	Jr
LB	42	Chris Cessna	Fr
LB	43	Mikhail Mabry	Jr
DE	45	Antwane Glenn	Fr
LB	46	Ronnie Sneed	Fr
LB	47	A. J. Nance	Jr
DB	49	Antonio Thomas	Fr
LB	50	Sam Maxwell	Jr
LB	51	Johnny Williams	Sr
DT	53	Ricky Lumpkin	So
LB	54	Brandon Thurmond	So
LB	56	Braxton Kelley	Sr
LB	57	Jacob Dufrene	Fr
DL	60	Shane McCord	Fr
DE	62	Greg Meisner	Fr
DE	67	Charles Mustafaa	Fr
DL	67	Joe Scott	So
DE	69	B. J. Wiedemann	So
DB	71	James Alexander	Jr
DE	90	Jamil Paris	Jr
DT	91	Corey Peters	Jr
DE	92	Josh Minton	So
DT	93	Austin Moss	Jr
DT	95	Ventrell Jenkins	Sr
DE	97	Nii Adjei Oninku	Sr
DT	98	Myron Pryor	So
DE	99	Jeremy Jarmon	So

Special teams

Pos.	#	Name	Class
P, K	9	Ryan Tydlacka	Fr
K	36	Lones Seiber	Jr
P, K	44	Tim Masthay	Sr
LS	58	Greg Curtin	Sr
LS	62	Clay Pear	So
LS	65	J. J. Helton	So
LS	74	Brad Hartr	So
K	97	J. J. Housley	Sr

Head coach

- Rich Brooks

Coordinators/assistant coaches

- Larry Brinson (running backs)
- Steve Brown (defensive coordinator)
- Jimmy Heggins (offensive line)
- David Lockwood (defensive backs)
- Steve Ortmayer (assistant head coach/special teams coordinator/tight ends)
- Gerad Parker (graduate assistant/wide receivers)
- Rick Petri (defensive line)
- Joker Phillips (offensive coordinator/wide receivers)
- Randy Sanders (quarterback)
- Chuck Smith (linebackers)
- Dontae Wright (graduate assistant/linebackers)

Legend

- (C) Team captain
- (S) Suspended
- (I) Ineligible
- Injured
- Redshirt

Roster
Last update: October 24, 2016
