= 2009 Denver Broncos season =

American football team season

- Broncos 50th season logo
- Owner: Pat Bowlen
- General manager: Brian Xanders
- Head coach: Josh McDaniels
- Home stadium: Invesco Field at Mile High

Results
- Record: 8–8
- Division place: 2nd AFC West
- Playoffs: Did not qualify
- All-Pros: Ryan Clady (1st team); Elvis Dumervil (1st team); Brian Dawkins (2nd team)
- Pro Bowlers: 5

Uniform

The 2009 Denver Broncos season and 50th season overall. The 2009 Broncos hold the dubious distinction of being one of the only three NFL teams, in the Super Bowl era, to start 6–0 or better and miss the playoffs (the others being the 1978 Washington Redskins and the 2003 Minnesota Vikings), losing 8 of their next 10 games after coming off bye week. They matched their 8–8 regular season record from 2008 and missed the playoffs for the fourth straight season. The Broncos welcomed many new defensive players signed during free agency, including veteran Eagles safety Brian Dawkins. This was their first season without head coach Mike Shanahan since 1994, as he was fired on December 30, 2008. On January 12, 2009, Denver hired former New England Patriots' offensive coordinator Josh McDaniels as their new head coach. At the time of his hiring, McDaniels was the youngest head coach in any of the four major North American professional sports and the fifth-youngest NFL head coach ever, though less than a week later the Tampa Bay Buccaneers named the even-younger Raheem Morris as their head coach.

According to the 2012 Football Outsiders Almanac, the 2009 Broncos had the second-largest improvement in defensive efficiency from the previous season.

== Roster changes ==
=== Free agents ===
Position	Player	Free agency tag	Date signed	2008 team
S	Brian Dawkins	UFA	February 28, 2009	Philadelphia Eagles
LS	Lonie Paxton	UFA	March 1, 2009	New England Patriots
WR	Jabar Gaffney	UFA	March 1, 2009	New England Patriots
RB	Correll Buckhalter	UFA	March 1, 2009	Philadelphia Eagles
OLB	Darrell Reid	UFA	March 2, 2009	Indianapolis Colts
S	Renaldo Hill	UFA	March 2, 2009	Miami Dolphins
LB	Andra Davis	UFA	March 2, 2009	Cleveland Browns
CB	Andre Goodman	UFA	March 3, 2009	Miami Dolphins
DE	Ronald Fields	UFA	March 3, 2009	San Francisco 49ers
RB	LaMont Jordan	UFA	March 4, 2009	New England Patriots
QB	Chris Simms	UFA	March 5, 2009	Tennessee Titans
RB	J.J. Arrington	UFA	March 5, 2009	Arizona Cardinals
DE	Kenny Peterson	UFA	March 10, 2009	Denver Broncos
G	Scott Young	UFA	March 13, 2009	Cleveland Browns
RFA: Restricted free agent, UFA: Unrestricted free agent, ERFA: Exclusive rights free agent

=== Signings ===
- TE Adam Bergen – Future contract
- QB Kyle Orton

=== Departures ===
- WR Cliff Russell (released)
- RB P.J. Pope (waived)
- TE Chad Mustard (released)
- RB Alex Haynes (released)
- RB Anthony Alridge (released) Played 2009 on Washington's Practice Squad
- DT Josh Shaw (released)
- LB Jamie Winborn (released) Played in 2 games during 2009 season for Tennessee
- DT Dewayne Robertson (released)
- S Marquand Manuel (released) Played in 9 games starting 6 during 2009 for Detroit, injured reserve after game 9
- LB Niko Koutouvides (released) Played in 16 gamed during 2009 for Tampa Bay
- TE Nate Jackson (released) Signed on in 2009 with Cleveland for a short time and was subsequently cut
- DE John Engelberger (released)
- CB Dré Bly (released) Played in 16 games starting 6 during 2009 for San Francisco
- LS Mike Leach (released) Played in 16 games during 2009 for Arizona
- RB Cory Boyd (waived)
- QB Darrell Hackney (waived)
- QB Jay Cutler (traded) Started 16 games during 2009 for Chicago
- OLB Tim Crowder (waived) played in 15 games starting 4 during 2009 for Tampa Bay
- RB Selvin Young (waived)
- S Herana-Daze Jones (released) Signed on in 2009 with New Orleans for a short time and was subsequently cut
- TE Jeb Putzier (released)
- C Kory Lichtensteiger (waived) Signed on with Minnesota for three games and was subsequently cut
- WR Chad Jackson (waived)
- DE Matthias Askew (waived) Signed on in 2009 with Detroit for a short time and was subsequently cut
- DE Nic Clemons (waived)
- P Brett Kern (waived) waived by Denver after playing in 6 games, was signed by Tennessee and played 10 games with the Titans
- CB Jack Williams (waived) waived by Denver after playing in 7 games, was signed by Detroit and played in 1 game and was injured
- CB Joshua Bell (waived/injured) Signed by Green Bay in Week 10, played in 4 games with the Packers

=== Jay Cutler controversy ===
After head coach Josh McDaniels was hired, rumors eventually surfaced that there was a three-way trade involving McDaniels' former team, the New England Patriots, and a third potential team (Detroit Lions or Tampa Bay Buccaneers) that would have sent quarterback Jay Cutler to the Lions or Buccaneers and the Broncos would receive Matt Cassel, who worked with McDaniels during the previous season, from the Patriots. After the trade talks surfaced, Cutler was angered and infuriated by the rumors because he didn't think he was going to be traded, and he refused to talk with either McDaniels or general manager Brian Xanders after both had denied the rumors.

Several teams became interested in trading for Cutler after it was apparent he was upset about this situation, though McDaniels had stated, "We are not trading Jay Cutler-Period." McDaniels insisted that Cutler is their quarterback.

On March 11, 2009, Cutler and McDaniels agreed to meet for the first time since the incident. After having a conference call between them, sources said that the two sides drifted further apart, although the team refused to comment. Cutler eventually requested to be traded some time afterward, feeling that the "trust" between the organization and himself were all but gone, and missed one of Denver's voluntary training camps.

On April 2, the Broncos traded Cutler, along with one of their two fifth-round selections (No. 140 overall) in the 2009 NFL draft, to the Chicago Bears in exchange for quarterback Kyle Orton, the Bears' first- (No. 18 overall) and third (No. 84th overall) picks in 2009, and their 2010 first-round selection.

On June 12, the Broncos named Orton as their starting quarterback. This ended speculation of a competition between Orton and Chris Simms.

=== Draft ===
2009 Denver Broncos Draft
Round	Selection	Player	Position	College
1	12	Knowshon Moreno	RB	Georgia
1	18 (Note: see Jay Cutler controversy.)	Robert Ayers	DE	Tennessee
2	37 (Note: The Broncos acquired this second-round selection in a trade that sent the team's 2010 first-round selection to the Seattle Seahawks.)	Alphonso Smith	CB	Wake Forest
2	48	Darcel McBath	S	Texas Tech
2	64 (Note: The Broncos acquired this second-round selection and this fourth-round selection in a trade that sent two third-round selections (Nos. 79 and 84 overall, the latter of which the Broncos acquired as part of the Jay Cutler trade) to the Pittsburgh Steelers.)	Richard Quinn	TE	North Carolina
3	None			
4	114	David Bruton	S	Notre Dame
4	132	Seth Olsen	G	Iowa
5 (Note: The Broncos acquired an additional fifth-round selection — No. 140 overall — in a trade that sent wide receiver Keary Colbert to the Seattle Seahawks. The Broncos later sent the No. 140 selection to the Chicago Bears as part of the Jay Cutler trade.)	141 (Note: The Broncos traded their original fifth- and sixth-round selections (Nos. 149 and 185 overall, respectively) to the Baltimore Ravens in exchange for the Ravens' fifth-round selection (No. 141 overall).)	Kenny McKinley	WR	South Carolina
6	174 (Note: The Broncos acquired this sixth-round selection in a trade that sent one of the team's two seventh-round selections (No. 235 overall — acquired in a trade that sent cornerback Dominique Foxworth to the Atlanta Falcons) and a 2010 fifth-round selection to the Detroit Lions.)	Tom Brandstater	QB	Fresno State
7	225	Blake Schlueter	C	TCU

== Schedule ==
=== Preseason ===
Week	Date	Opponent	Result	Record	Game site	NFL.com recap
1	August 14	at San Francisco 49ers	**L** 16–17	0–1	Candlestick Park	Recap
2	August 22	at Seattle Seahawks	**L** 13–27	0–2	Qwest Field	Recap
3	August 30	Chicago Bears	**L** 17–27	0–3	Invesco Field at Mile High	Recap
4	September 3	Arizona Cardinals	**W** 19–0	1–3	Invesco Field at Mile High	Recap

=== Regular season ===
Week	Date	Opponent	Result	Record	Game site	NFL.com recap
1	September 13	at Cincinnati Bengals	**W** 12–7	1–0	Paul Brown Stadium	Recap
2	September 20	Cleveland Browns	**W** 27–6	2–0	Invesco Field at Mile High	Recap
3	September 27	at **Oakland Raiders**	**W** 23–3	3–0	Oakland–Alameda County Coliseum	Recap
4	October 4	Dallas Cowboys	**W** 17–10	4–0	Invesco Field at Mile High	Recap
5 (Note: These two games were among the 16 that the NFL designated as "AFL Legacy Games," in honor of the 50th anniversary of the AFL. The Broncos wore their throwback uniforms during those two games, as did the Patriots and Chargers. The Broncos wore the yellow jerseys (with brown numerals) against the Patriots, and the white jerseys (with brown numerals) at the Chargers.)	October 11	New England Patriots	**W** 20–17 (OT)	5–0	Invesco Field at Mile High	Recap
6	October 19	at **San Diego Chargers**	**W** 34–23	6–0	Qualcomm Stadium	Recap
7	Bye					
8	November 1	at Baltimore Ravens	**L** 7–30	6–1	M&T Bank Stadium	Recap
9	November 9	Pittsburgh Steelers	**L** 10–28	6–2	Invesco Field at Mile High	Recap
10	November 15	at Washington Redskins	**L** 17–27	6–3	FedExField	Recap
11	November 22	**San Diego Chargers**	**L** 3–32	6–4	Invesco Field at Mile High	Recap
12	November 26	New York Giants	**W** 26–6	7–4	Invesco Field at Mile High	Recap
13	December 6	at **Kansas City Chiefs**	**W** 44–13	8–4	Arrowhead Stadium	Recap
14	December 13	at Indianapolis Colts	**L** 16–28	8–5	Lucas Oil Stadium	Recap
15	December 20	**Oakland Raiders**	**L** 19–20	8–6	Invesco Field at Mile High	Recap
16	December 27	at Philadelphia Eagles	**L** 27–30	8–7	Lincoln Financial Field	Recap
17	January 3	**Kansas City Chiefs**	**L** 24–44	8–8	Invesco Field at Mile High	Recap

Note: Intra-division games are in bold text.

=== Game summaries ===
==== Week 1: at Cincinnati Bengals ====
Week One: Denver Broncos at Cincinnati Bengals – Game summary

Quarter	1	2	3	4	Total
**Broncos**	0	3	3	6	**12**
Bengals	0	0	0	7	**7**

at Paul Brown Stadium, Cincinnati, Ohio

- Date: September 13
- Game time: 1:00 p.m. EDT/11:00 a.m. MDT
- Game weather: 73 °F (23 °C), sunny
- Game attendance: 62,831
- Referee: Jerome Boger
- TV announcers (CBS): Gus Johnson and Dan Fouts
- Gamebook

The game began with little action. Denver and Cincinnati both traded possessions to begin the game. However, on the Bengals' second possession they were able to drive deep into Denver territory, reaching the 11-yard line before setting up for a short field goal. However, the field goal snap was fumbled. After the flubbed field goal, both teams entered a period of offensive ineptness – Denver had four consecutive one-and-done drives, while Cincinnati was forced to punt, then had a promising drive end with a Carson Palmer interception after Denver cornerback Champ Bailey tipped the ball into the air and Wesley Woodyard recovered the interception. Denver was finally able to put together a drive at the end of the first half that finished with a Matt Prater 48-yard field goal as time ran out. Despite being out-gained in all offensive indicators, Denver took a 3–0 lead into halftime due to Cincinnati mistakes, including the fumbled field goal, interception, and multiple dropped passes.

During the third quarter, neither team was able to sustain an offensive drive – Cincinnati punted 3 times, while Denver punted 2 times. However, Denver's defense showed improvement, including one Cincinnati drive that ended after two consecutive sacks of Carson Palmer. Denver was able to put together another field goal drive at the end of the third quarter, with Matt Prater this time kicking a 50-yard field goal to put the Broncos on top 6–0.

The fourth quarter continued in much the same vein. Denver made it into field goal range again before a 5-yard penalty and 7-yard sack forced them to punt it away again. However, Cincinnati was able to put together their first sustained drive of the entire game during the second half of the quarter – the Bengals gained 90 yards on 11 plays over 5:40. This culminated with a 1-yard Cedric Benson touchdown run that avoided a Bengals shutout and put them on top for the first time.

Denver regained control of the ball at their own 13-yard line with 38 seconds remaining. After an incomplete pass, Kyle Orton attempted a pass to Brandon Marshall with 28 seconds remaining. The ball was tipped into the air by Bengals cornerback Leon Hall and into the hands of Denver wide receiver Brandon Stokley, who then took it untouched 87 yards to the end zone with 11 seconds remaining. Records showed that this was the longest play from scrimmage in NFL history with less than 1 minute remaining in the game. The play was referred to by some as "The Immaculate Deflection" after The Immaculate Reception. Denver took a 12–7 lead but failed a two-point conversion. A desperation hail mary pass by Carson Palmer was intercepted in the end zone with 5 seconds to play by Denver tight end Tony Scheffler.

==== Week 2: vs. Cleveland Browns ====
Week Two: Cleveland Browns at Denver Broncos – Game summary

Quarter	1	2	3	4	Total
Browns	6	0	0	0	**6**
**Broncos**	7	3	3	14	**27**

at INVESCO Field at Mile High, Denver, Colorado

- Date: September 20
- Game time: 2:15 p.m. MDT
- Game weather: 82 °F (28 °C), partly cloudy
- Game attendance: 73,931
- Referee: Pete Morelli
- TV announcers (CBS): Bill Macatee and Steve Beuerlein
- Gamebook

Coming off their last-second victory over the Bengals, the Broncos would play their Week 2 home opener against the Cleveland Browns. In the first quarter, Denver would trail early as Browns kicker Phil Dawson got a 22-yard field goal. Afterwards, the Broncos took the lead as quarterback Kyle Orton completed a 2-yard touchdown pass to tight end Tony Scheffler. Cleveland would creep close as Dawson made a 47-yard field goal, but Denver would answer as kicker Matt Prater got a 23-yard field goal in the second quarter and a 38-yard field goal in the third quarter. In the fourth, the Broncos pulled away as fullback Peyton Hillis got a 2-yard touchdown run and running back Correll Buckhalter got a 45-yard touchdown run.

With the win, Denver improved to 2–0.

==== Week 3: at Oakland Raiders ====
Week Three: Denver Broncos at Oakland Raiders – Game summary

Quarter	1	2	3	4	Total
**Broncos**	10	3	7	3	**23**
Raiders	0	3	0	0	**3**

at Oakland–Alameda County Coliseum, Oakland, California

- Date: September 27
- Game time: 2:15 p.m. MDT/1:15 p.m. PDT
- Game weather: 81 °F (27 °C), sunny
- Game attendance: 45,602
- Referee: Ed Hochuli
- TV announcers (CBS): Ian Eagle and Rich Gannon
- Gamebook

After Oakland began the game with a 3-and-out, Denver sustained a long drive deep into Oakland territory. However, the Raiders orchestrated a successful goal-line stand, forcing Denver to turn the ball over on downs after a fourth-and-goal from the 1-yard line was stopped. Two plays later, however, Raiders quarterback JaMarcus Russell was intercepted by Denver safety Renaldo Hill after throwing from his own end zone. The Broncos then drove 23 yards in 6 plays, scoring on a 2-yard Kyle Orton pass to Brandon Marshall. The next Raiders drive lasted just 3 plays after Russell was intercepted again, this time by Broncos cornerback Andre Goodman. This led to a 48-yard field goal by Broncos kicker Matt Prater, giving them a 10–0 lead going into the 2nd quarter.

Oakland's first drive of the second quarter was also their most successful. They went 56 yards in over 8 minutes, leading to a 48-yard Sebastian Janikowski field goal. Denver then drove 76 yards, although Oakland again held Denver out of the end zone, leading to a 21-yard Prater field goal and giving the Broncos a 13–3 lead going into halftime. Denver then opened the half with another scoring drive, this time going 80 yards in 8 plays and scoring on a 7-yard run by rookie running back Knowshon Moreno. It was the first touchdown of Moreno's NFL career. Oakland was forced to punt on their next drive. However, on Denver's first play from scrimmage, running back Correll Buckhalter fumbled the ball at their own 16-yard line, giving Oakland the ball in Denver territory for just the 3rd time on the day. However, 2 plays later, Raiders running back Darren McFadden fumbled the ball for the second time on the day (the first time was recovered by Oakland), giving Denver the ball back at their own 11. They then drove 88 yards in 16 plays and over 8 minutes, although the Raiders again held them out of the end zone, leading to a Prater 24-yard field goal.

The Broncos won the game primarily on the strength of their running game and the defense. Correll Buckhalter ran 14 times for 108 yards, while rookie Knowshown Moreno ran 21 times for 90 yards. Overall, the Broncos had 215 yards rushing on the day. The defense held the Raiders to just 137 total yards and 9 first downs, caused 2 interceptions and 1 fumble, and also sacked JaMarcus Russell 3 times, 2 of them by star defensive end Elvis Dumervil (who had 4 in the previous game against the Cleveland Browns). Russell had just 61 yards passing on 21 attempts with 2 interceptions, giving him a quarterback rating of 22.6. Kyle Orton had 157 yards passing on 23 attempts with 1 touchdown and 0 interceptions, giving him a respectable 92.1 rating.

With the win, Denver improved to 3–0.

==== Week 4: vs. Dallas Cowboys ====
Week Four: Dallas Cowboys at Denver Broncos – Game summary

Quarter	1	2	3	4	Total
Cowboys	10	0	0	0	**10**
**Broncos**	0	7	0	10	**17**

at INVESCO Field at Mile High, Denver, Colorado

- Date: October 4
- Game time: 2:15 p.m. MDT
- Game weather: 55 °F (13 °C), partly cloudy
- Game attendance: 76,440
- Referee: Walt Anderson
- TV announcers (Fox): Joe Buck, Troy Aikman and Pam Oliver
- Gamebook

Coming off their divisional road win over the Raiders, the Broncos went home for a Week 4 interconference duel with the Dallas Cowboys. Denver would struggle out of the gates in the first quarter, as Cowboys kicker Nick Folk got a 49-yard field goal and running back Marion Barber would acquire a 1-yard touchdown run. The Broncos would start to gain some momentum in the second quarter with quarterback Kyle Orton's 9-yard touchdown pass to rookie running back Knowshon Moreno. After a scoreless third quarter, Denver would take command of the game in the fourth quarter. The Broncos would get a 28-yard field goal from kicker Matt Prater, followed by Orton's 51-yard touchdown pass to wide receiver Brandon Marshall. Afterwards, the defense would manage to hold off a late Dallas drive that actually made it to their 1-yard line.

With the win, the Broncos would acquire their first 4–0 start since 2003.

==== Week 5: vs. New England Patriots ====
Week Five: New England Patriots at Denver Broncos – Game summary

Quarter	1	2	3	4	OT	Total
Patriots	10	7	0	0	0	**17**
**Broncos**	0	7	3	7	3	**20**

at INVESCO Field at Mile High, Denver, Colorado

- Date: October 11
- Game time: 2:15 p.m. MDT
- Game weather: 30 °F (−1 °C), cloudy
- Game attendance: 76,011
- Referee: Carl Cheffers
- TV announcers (CBS): Jim Nantz and Phil Simms
- Gamebook

Coming off of a home win against the Cowboys, the Broncos stayed at home, donned their throwback uniforms, and prepared for a Week 5 AFL Legacy game with the New England Patriots. This would mark the highly anticipated match-up between Denver head coach Josh McDaniels and New England's head coach Bill Belichick.

The Broncos would trail in the first quarter as Patriots quarterback Tom Brady hooked up with wide receiver Wes Welker on an 8-yard touchdown pass, followed by kicker Stephen Gostkowski getting a 53-yard field goal. Denver would answer in the second quarter as quarterback Kyle Orton connected with wide receiver Brandon Marshall on an 11-yard touchdown pass, but New England would close out the half with Brady's 7-yard touchdown pass to tight end Benjamin Watson.

The Broncos would tie the game in the second half as kicker Matt Prater nailed a 24-yard field goal in the third quarter, followed by Orton finding Marshall again on an 11-yard touchdown pass in the fourth quarter. In overtime, Denver won possession and never relinquished possession as Prater booted the game-winning 41-yard field goal.

With the win, the Broncos improved to 5–0 for the first time since the team's Super Bowl run of 1998.

==== Week 6: at San Diego Chargers ====
Week Six: Denver Broncos at San Diego Chargers – Game summary

Quarter	1	2	3	4	Total
**Broncos**	7	10	7	10	**34**
Chargers	10	10	3	0	**23**

at Qualcomm Stadium, San Diego, California

- Date: October 19
- Game time: 6:30 p.m. MDT/5:30 p.m. PDT
- Game weather: 68 °F (20 °C), clear
- Game attendance: 68,615
- Referee: Scott Green
- TV announcers (ESPN): Mike Tirico, Ron Jaworski, Jon Gruden and Michele Tafoya
- Gamebook

Coming off an impressive home win over the Patriots, the Broncos flew to Qualcomm Stadium, donned their throwbacks again, and played a Week 6 AFL Legacy game with the San Diego Chargers on Monday night. Even though the Chargers kicked off the first quarter with a 20-yard field goal from kicker Nate Kaeding, the Broncos immediately struck back with wide receiver Eddie Royal returned the kickoff 93 yards for a touchdown. San Diego would then close out the opening period with quarterback Philip Rivers hooking up with wide receiver Vincent Jackson on a 3-yard touchdown pass. Denver would take the lead in the second quarter with kicker Matt Prater making a 34-yard field goal, followed by Royal returning a punt 71 yards for a touchdown. Afterwards, the Chargers closed out the half with Kaeding nailing a 44-yard field goal and running back Darren Sproles returning a punt 77 yards for a touchdown.

Even though San Diego increased their lead in the third quarter with Kaeding's 50-yard field goal, the Broncos regained it with quarterback Kyle Orton completing a 19-yard touchdown pass to tight end Tony Scheffler. In the fourth quarter, Denver closed out the game with Prater's 29-yard field goal and Orton's 5-yard touchdown pass to wide receiver Brandon Stokley.

With the win, the Broncos went into their bye week at 6–0, which is the franchise's best start since their Super Bowl season of 1998.

==== Week 8: at Baltimore Ravens ====
Week Eight: Denver Broncos at Baltimore Ravens – Game summary

Quarter	1	2	3	4	Total
Broncos	0	0	7	0	**7**
**Ravens**	3	3	10	14	**30**

at M&T Bank Stadium, Baltimore, Maryland

- Date: November 1
- Game time: 1:00 p.m. EST/11:00 a.m. MST
- Game weather: 56 °F (13 °C), showers
- Game attendance: 71,132
- Referee: Walt Coleman
- TV announcers (CBS): Greg Gumbel and Dan Dierdorf
- Gamebook

Coming off their bye week, the Broncos flew to M&T Bank Stadium for a Week 8 duel with the Baltimore Ravens. Denver would trail in the first quarter as Ravens kicker Steven Hauschka nailed a 43-yard field goal in the first quarter, followed by a 35-yard field goal in the second quarter. In the third quarter, the Broncos' deficit immediately climbed as cornerback Lardarius Webb returned the second half's opening kickoff 95 yards for a touchdown. Denver would answer with a 1-yard touchdown run from rookie running back Knowshon Moreno, Baltimore came right back with Haushchka booting a 31-yard field goal. Afterwards, the Ravens would pull away in the fourth quarter with quarterback Joe Flacco's 20-yard touchdown pass to wide receiver Derrick Mason and running back Ray Rice getting a 7-yard touchdown run.

With the loss, the Broncos fell to 6–1.

==== Week 9: vs. Pittsburgh Steelers ====
Week Nine: Pittsburgh Steelers at Denver Broncos – Game summary

Quarter	1	2	3	4	Total
**Steelers**	0	7	7	14	**28**
Broncos	3	0	7	0	**10**

at INVESCO Field at Mile High, Denver, Colorado

- Date: November 9
- Game time: 6:30 p.m. MST
- Game weather: 55 °F (13 °C), mostly clear
- Game attendance: 76,716
- Referee: Don Carey
- TV announcers (ESPN): Mike Tirico, Ron Jaworski, Jon Gruden and Suzy Kolber
- Gamebook

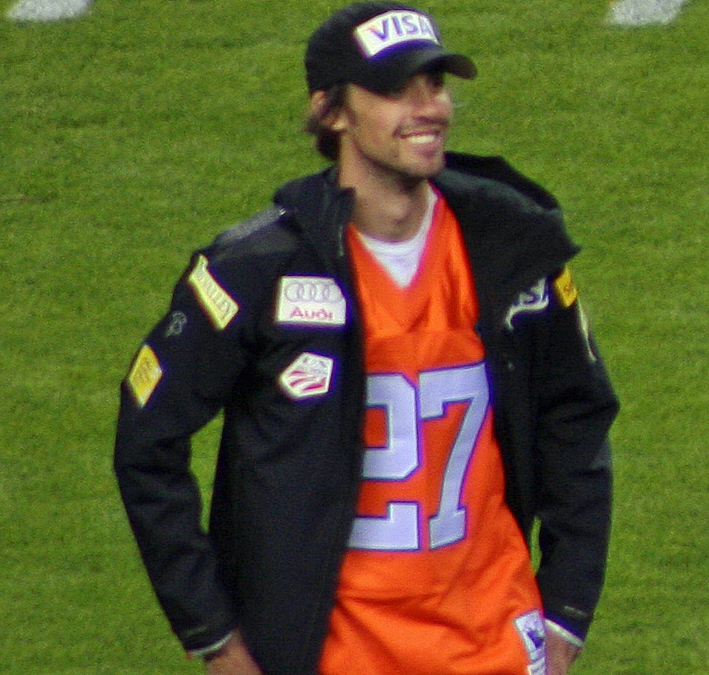
American Nordic combined skier Johnny Spillane at the game between the Steelers and the Broncos.

Hoping to rebound from their road loss to the Ravens, the Broncos went home for a Week 9 Monday night duel with the defending Super Bowl champion Pittsburgh Steelers. Denver would begin the first quarter with kicker Matt Prater making a 40-yard field goal, yet the Steelers responded in the second quarter with safety Tyrone Carter returning an interception 48 yards for a touchdown.

The Broncos would regain the lead in the third quarter as defensive end Kenny Peterson forced a fumble during his sack of quarterback Ben Roethlisberger. It allowed rookie linebacker Robert Ayers to return the fumble 54 yards for a touchdown. However, Pittsburgh came right back with Roethlisberger's 3-yard touchdown pass to wide receiver Hines Ward. Afterwards, the Steelers would pull away in the fourth quarter as Roethlisberger completed a 25-yard touchdown pass to wide receiver Mike Wallace and a 3-yard touchdown pass to Ward.

Making an appearance during the game was American Nordic combined skier Johnny Spillane, a Steamboat Springs, Colorado native, who would go on to win three silver medals at the 2010 Winter Olympics in Vancouver three months later.

With the loss, Denver fell to 6–2.

==== Week 10: at Washington Redskins ====
Week Ten: Denver Broncos at Washington Redskins – Game summary

Quarter	1	2	3	4	Total
Broncos	14	3	0	0	**17**
**Redskins**	7	7	0	13	**27**

at FedExField, Landover, Maryland

- Date: November 15
- Game time: 1:00 p.m. EST/11:00 a.m. MST
- Game weather: 70 °F (21 °C), sunny
- Game attendance: 85,247
- Referee: Pete Morelli
- TV announcers (CBS): Greg Gumbel and Dan Dierdorf
- Gamebook

Trying to snap a two-game losing streak, the Broncos flew to FedExField for a Week 10 interconference duel with the Washington Redskins. In the first quarter, Denver struck first as quarterback Kyle Orton found wide receiver Brandon Marshall on a 40-yard touchdown pass. The Redskins would respond as quarterback Jason Campbell completed a 2-yard touchdown pass to tight end Todd Yoder, yet the Broncos would answer with Orton going right back to Marshall again on a 75-yard touchdown pass. Washington would tie the game again in the second quarter with a trick play as punter Hunter Smith completed a 35-yard touchdown pass to fullback Mike Sellers. Denver would close out the half with a 24-yard field goal from kicker Matt Prater but on the previous play Orton (11/18 for 193 yards, 2 TDs) left the game with an ankle injury. This injury would prove costly not only in this game but the next for the Broncos. Chris Simms replaced Orton at quarterback but was unable to get anything going on offense for the Broncos, going a dismal 3/21 for 13 yards with 1 INT. After a scoreless third quarter, the Redskins would take the lead in the fourth quarter with a 1-yard touchdown run from running back Ladell Betts and a 35-yard field goal from kicker Shaun Suisham.

With their third-straight loss, the Broncos fell to 6–3.

==== Week 11: vs. San Diego Chargers ====
Week Eleven: San Diego Chargers at Denver Broncos – Game summary

Quarter	1	2	3	4	Total
**Chargers**	7	6	7	12	**32**
Broncos	0	0	3	0	**3**

at INVESCO Field at Mile High, Denver, Colorado

- Date: November 22
- Game time: 2:15 p.m. MST
- Game weather: 51 °F (11 °C), sunny
- Game attendance: 74,707
- Referee: Ron Winter
- TV announcers (CBS): Dick Enberg and Dan Fouts
- Gamebook

In the first half, the Chargers got off to a great start when QB Philip Rivers got a 2-yard touchdown pass to WR Legedu Naanee. Then kicker Nate Kaeding hit a 28 and a 47-yard field goal. In the third quarter the Broncos scored their only points of the game when kicker Matt Prater got a 23-yard field goal, yet the Chargers replied and started to rally with RB LaDainian Tomlinson getting a 1-yard touchdown run, and in the fourth quarter Kaeding making a 28 then a 19-yard field goal, and finally FB Mike Tolbert ran 8 yards to the end zone for a touchdown (With PAT kick blocked).

With the fourth straight loss, the Broncos fell to a 6–4 record as the Chargers improved to a 7–3 record and took the divisional lead.

==== Week 12: vs. New York Giants ====
Thanksgiving Day game

Week Twelve: New York Giants at Denver Broncos – Game summary

Quarter	1	2	3	4	Total
Giants	0	0	6	0	**6**
**Broncos**	3	13	0	10	**26**

at INVESCO Field at Mile High, Denver, Colorado

- Date: November 26
- Game time: 6:20 p.m. MST
- Game weather: 57 °F (14 °C), mostly clear
- Game attendance: 74,896
- Referee: Tony Corrente
- TV announcers (NFLN): Bob Papa and Matt Millen
- Gamebook

Trying to avoid a five-game losing streak, the Broncos went home for a Week 12 Interconference Duel against the New York Giants.

In the first quarter the Broncos got on the board with kicker Matt Prater making a 26-yard field goal and then a 32-yard field goal in the second quarter. The Broncos kept on top with RB Knowshon Moreno making a 1-yard touchdown run. After that Matt Prater made a 47-yard field goal to end the half. In the third quarter the Giants replied with kicker Lawrence Tynes nailing a 39 then a 52-yard field goal. In the fourth quarter Denver increased their lead with QB Kyle Orton making a 17-yard touchdown pass to WR Brandon Stokley, and Prater making a 24-yard field goal.

With the win, the Broncos improved to 7–4.

==== Week 13: at Kansas City Chiefs ====
Week Thirteen: Denver Broncos at Kansas City Chiefs – Game summary

Quarter	1	2	3	4	Total
**Broncos**	7	7	20	10	**44**
Chiefs	0	6	0	7	**13**

at Arrowhead Stadium, Kansas City, Missouri

- Date: December 6
- Game time: 12:00 p.m. CST/11:00 a.m. MST
- Game weather: 37 °F (3 °C), overcast
- Game attendance: 68,912
- Referee: Jeff Triplette
- TV announcers (CBS): Dick Enberg and Dan Fouts
- Gamebook

==== Week 14: at Indianapolis Colts ====
Week Fourteen: Denver Broncos at Indianapolis Colts – Game summary

Quarter	1	2	3	4	Total
Broncos	0	7	0	9	**16**
**Colts**	14	7	0	7	**28**

at Lucas Oil Stadium, Indianapolis, Indiana

- Date: December 13
- Game time: 1:00 p.m. EST/11:00 a.m. MST
- Game weather: Played indoors (retractable roof closed)
- Game attendance: 67,248
- Referee: Bill Leavy
- TV announcers (CBS): Dick Enberg and Dan Fouts
- Gamebook

Coming off a two-game winning streak, the Broncos headed to Lucas Oil Stadium to play the undefeated Colts. In the first half, the Colts jumped out to a 21–0 lead. Denver finally scored when Kyle Orton found Brandon Marshall in the end zone going to the locker rooms trailing 21–7. For most of the second half, the Colts offense sputtered. In a long drive, Orton found Marshall for his second touchdown, however, the two-point conversion was no good, making the score 21–16. Then the Colts offense got things going late in the fourth. After a long drive, Manning found Dallas Clark in the end zone for his third touchdown of the day, putting the Colts on top 28–16 with under three minutes left in the game. On a long fourth down, Orton found Marshall who lateraled the ball to a lineman who was tackled short of the first down. With the win, the Colts broke an NFL record with 23 straight wins. Though despite the loss, Broncos WR Brandon Marshall had a record of his own with 21 catches beating Terrell Owens' record.

==== Week 15: vs. Oakland Raiders ====
Week Fifteen: Oakland Raiders at Denver Broncos – Game summary

Quarter	1	2	3	4	Total
**Raiders**	0	13	0	7	**20**
Broncos	6	0	10	3	**19**

at INVESCO Field at Mile High, Denver, Colorado

- Date: December 20
- Game time: 2:05 p.m. MST
- Game weather: 57 °F (14 °C), sunny
- Game attendance: 74,502
- Referee: Alberto Riveron
- TV announcers (CBS): Gus Johnson and Steve Tasker
- Gamebook

==== Week 16: at Philadelphia Eagles ====
Week Sixteen: Denver Broncos at Philadelphia Eagles – Game summary

Quarter	1	2	3	4	Total
Broncos	0	7	17	3	**27**
**Eagles**	10	10	7	3	**30**

at Lincoln Financial Field, Philadelphia, Pennsylvania

- Date: December 27
- Game time: 4:15 p.m. EST/2:15 p.m. MST
- Game weather: 45 °F (7 °C), sunny
- Game attendance: 69,144
- Referee: Mike Carey
- TV announcers (CBS): Jim Nantz and Phil Simms
- Gamebook

==== Week 17: vs. Kansas City Chiefs ====
Week Seventeen: Kansas City Chiefs at Denver Broncos – Game summary

Quarter	1	2	3	4	Total
**Chiefs**	7	3	17	17	**44**
Broncos	0	10	14	0	**24**

at INVESCO Field at Mile High, Denver, Colorado

- Date: January 3, 2010
- Game time: 2:15 p.m. MST
- Game weather: 36 °F (2 °C), mostly cloudy
- Game attendance: 73,725
- Referee: Scott Green
- TV announcers (CBS): Dick Enberg and Dan Fouts
- Gamebook

Going into week 17, Denver could have made the playoffs if they won in these scenarios-

1. A New York Jets loss and either a loss by the Baltimore Ravens or the Pittsburgh Steelers OR
2. A New York Jets loss and a win by the Houston Texans OR
3. A Baltimore Ravens loss and a Pittsburgh Steelers loss or a Houston Texans win.

Also, Denver could have made the playoffs even with a loss to Kansas City in these scenarios-

1. Losses by Pittsburgh, Baltimore, Houston, and the Jacksonville Jaguars OR
2. Losses by Pittsburgh, Baltimore, Houston, and New York OR
3. Losses by Pittsburgh, Baltimore, Jacksonville, and New York OR
4. Losses by Pittsburgh, Houston, Jacksonville, and New York OR
5. Losses by New York, Baltimore, Houston, Jacksonville, and the Miami Dolphins

In the days prior to the game, Coach Josh McDaniels got into an injury-related dispute with receiver Brandon Marshall and deactivated Marshall.

In the game, Chiefs' running back Jamaal Charles had a franchise record 259 yards rushing yards on 25 carries and two touchdowns (Including runs of 52 and 56 yards). Kyle Orton, who had thrown only 9 interceptions all year, threw 3: 2 to Chiefs linebacker Derrick Johnson, both returned for scores, and another in the end zone to Brandon Flowers. Orton did finish with a career-high 431 yards through the air on 32/56 passing. Jabar Gaffney, replacing the inactive Brandon Marshall, had a career-high 14 receptions for 213 yards.

Both career days were empty, as the Chiefs beat the Broncos, ending their season at 8–8. The Broncos became the seventh team since the 1970 AFL-NFL merger to miss the playoffs after a 6–0 start and the first since the 2003 Minnesota Vikings.

== Standings ==
AFC West
	W	L	T	PCT	DIV	CONF	PF	PA	STK
^{(2)} San Diego Chargers	13	3	0	.813	5–1	9–3	454	320	W11
Denver Broncos	8	8	0	.500	3–3	6–6	326	324	L4
Oakland Raiders	5	11	0	.313	2–4	4–8	197	379	L2
Kansas City Chiefs	4	12	0	.250	2–4	3–9	294	424	W1

== Personnel ==
=== Staff / Coaches ===
2009 Denver Broncos staff
Front office: Chairman/president/CEO – Pat Bowlen; General manager – Brian Xanders; Director of football administration – Mike Bluem; Director of college scouting – Matt Russell; Assistant director of college scouting – Lenny McGill; Director of pro personnel – Keith Kidd; Head coaches: Head coach – Josh McDaniels; Assistant to head coach – Mark Thewes; Offensive coaches: Offensive coordinator/quarterbacks – Mike McCoy; Running backs – Bobby Turner; Wide receivers – Adam Gase; Tight ends – Clancy Barone; Offensive line – Rick Dennison; Coaching assistant – Ben McDaniels	Defensive coaches: Defensive coordinator – Mike Nolan; Defensive line – Wayne Nunnely; Linebackers – Don Martindale; Assistant linebackers – Roman Phifer; Secondary – Ed Donatell; Coaching assistant – Jay Rodgers; Special teams coaches: Special teams coordinator – Mike Priefer; Assistant special teams – Keith Burns; Strength and conditioning: Strength and conditioning – Rich Tuten; Assistant strength and conditioning – Greg Saporta

=== Final roster ===
2009 Denver Broncos roster
Quarterbacks (QB): 3 Tom Brandstater; 8 Kyle Orton; 2 Chris Simms; Running backs (RB): 28 Correll Buckhalter; 22 Peyton Hillis FB; 32 LaMont Jordan; 46 Spencer Larsen FB; 27 Knowshon Moreno; Wide receivers (WR): 10 Jabar Gaffney; 84 Brandon Lloyd; 15 Brandon Marshall; 19 Eddie Royal; 14 Brandon Stokley; 12 Matt Willis; Tight ends (TE): 89 Daniel Graham; 81 Richard Quinn; 88 Tony Scheffler	Offensive linemen (OL): 78 Ryan Clady T; 77 Brandon Gorin T; 50 Ben Hamilton G; 73 Chris Kuper G; 70 Seth Olsen G; 76 Tyler Polumbus T; 62 Casey Wiegmann C; Defensive linemen (DL): 75 Chris Baker NT; 91 Ronald Fields NT; 99 Vonnie Holliday DE; 98 Ryan McBean DE; 90 Kenny Peterson DE; 97 Le Kevin Smith NT; 79 Marcus Thomas DE	Linebackers (LB): 56 Robert Ayers OLB; 54 Andra Davis ILB; 92 Elvis Dumervil OLB; 57 Mario Haggan OLB; 94 Jarvis Moss OLB; 95 Darrell Reid OLB; 55 D. J. Williams ILB; 59 Wesley Woodyard ILB; Defensive backs (DB): 24 Champ Bailey CB; 36 Josh Barrett SS; 30 David Bruton SS; 25 Tony Carter CB; 20 Brian Dawkins FS; 39 Vernon Fox FS; 21 André Goodman CB; 23 Renaldo Hill SS; 26 Ty Law CB; 33 Alphonso Smith CB/PR; Special teams (ST): 17 Mitch Berger P; 4 Britton Colquitt P; 66 Lonie Paxton LS; 5 Matt Prater K	Practice squad: 35 Lance Ball RB; 67 D'Anthony Batiste OT; 85 Marquez Branson TE; 61 Mitch Erickson G; 48 Braxton Kelley LB; 40 Rashod Moulton CB; 64 Everette Pedescleaux DE (IR); 96 Carlton Powell NT; Reserve: 58 Nick Greisen ILB (IR); 74 Ryan Harris OT (IR); 71 Russ Hochstein G (IR); 31 Darcel McBath S (IR); 11 Kenny McKinley WR (IR); 69 J'Vonne Parker NT (IR); Rookies in italics 53 active, 7 reserve, 7 practice squad
