= Kenny Peterson =

American football player (born 1978)

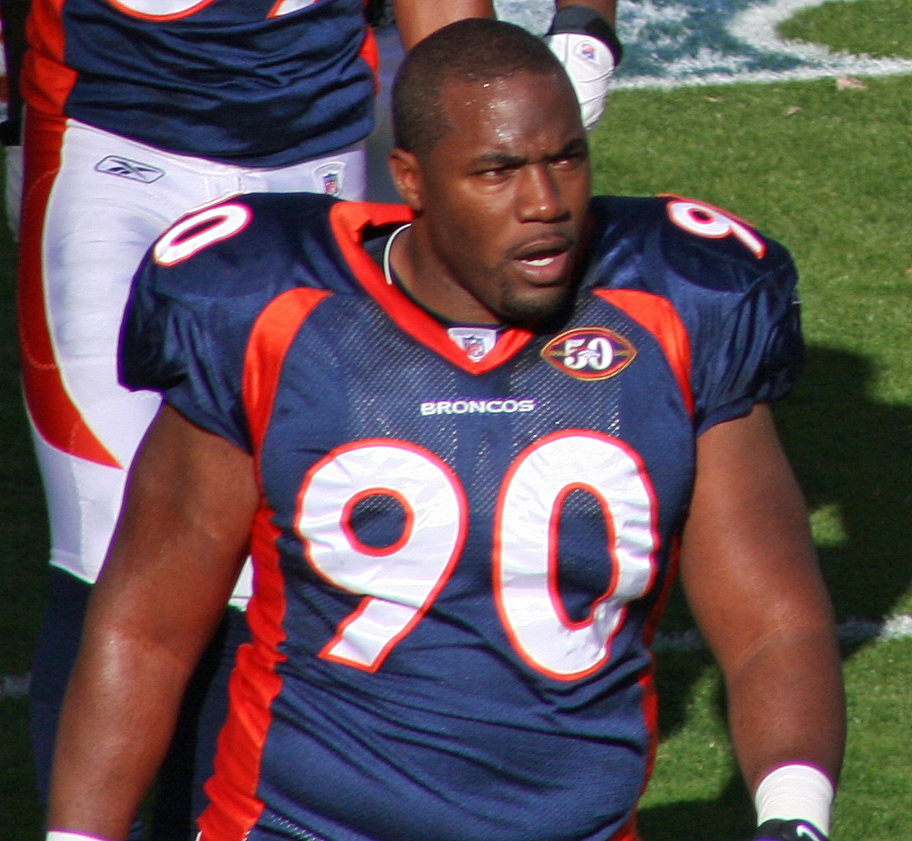
- Peterson with the Denver Broncos in 2009

No. 98, 90, 97
- Position: Defensive end

Personal information
- Born: November 21, 1978 (age 47); Canton, Ohio, U.S.
- Listed height: 6 ft 3 in (1.91 m)
- Listed weight: 300 lb (136 kg)

Career information
- High school: McKinley (Canton)
- College: Ohio State
- NFL draft: 2003: 3rd round, 79th overall pick

Career history
- Green Bay Packers (2003–2005); Denver Broncos (2006–2009)

Awards and highlights
- BCS national champion (2002); Second-team All-Big Ten (2002)

Career NFL statistics
- Total tackles: 118
- Sacks: 8
- Forced fumbles: 4
- Fumble recoveries: 2
- Stats at Pro Football Reference

James Kenneth Peterson (born November 21, 1978) is an American former professional football player who was a defensive end in the National Football League (NFL). He was selected by the Green Bay Packers in the third round of the 2003 NFL draft. He played college football for the Ohio State Buckeyes.

== Early life ==
Peterson played high school football at McKinley High School in Canton, Ohio, where he was a teammate of former Broncos head coach Josh McDaniels' brother Ben McDaniels. While there he helped his team win the Ohio Division I title in 1997. During his senior year, he was honored as an All-American after posting 101 tackles and 15 sacks. Peterson was also a star basketball player achieving all-city selection as a senior.

== College career ==
Peterson played college football at Ohio State. During his senior season, he was honored with second-team All-Big Ten Conference and helped his team win the BCS National Championship Game. He finished his college career with 84 tackles, 12 sacks, one interception, and three forced fumbles.

== Professional career ==
=== Green Bay Packers ===
Peterson was selected by the Green Bay Packers in the third round of the 2003 NFL draft. He spent three seasons in Green Bay recording three sacks. He was released by the Packers on September 2, 2006.

=== Denver Broncos ===
On October 11, 2006, Peterson signed with the Denver Broncos. He was suspended for the first four games of the 2007 season for violating the NFL's steroid policy. During 2007 the Broncos released him twice but decided to re-sign him each time. On March 4, 2009, Peterson re-signed with the Broncos on a three-year contract. He was cut once again on March 10, 2010.

== NFL career statistics ==
Legend
| **Bold** | Career high |

=== Regular season ===
| Year | Team | Games | | Tackles | | | | | Interceptions | | | | | Fumbles | | | |
| Year | Team | GP | GS | Cmb | Solo | Ast | Sck | TFL | Int | Yds | TD | Lng | PD | FF | FR | Yds | TD |
|---|---|---|---|---|---|---|---|---|---|---|---|---|---|---|---|---|---|
| 2003 | GNB | 9 | 0 | 8 | 5 | 3 | 0.0 | 1 | 0 | 0 | 0 | 0 | 1 | 0 | 0 | 0 | 0 |
| 2004 | GNB | 9 | 0 | 11 | 9 | 2 | 0.0 | 2 | 0 | 0 | 0 | 0 | 0 | 0 | 0 | 0 | 0 |
| 2005 | GNB | **16** | 0 | 24 | 19 | 5 | **3.0** | 3 | 0 | 0 | 0 | 0 | **3** | **2** | **2** | **18** | 0 |
| 2006 | DEN | 3 | 0 | 1 | 0 | 1 | 0.0 | 0 | 0 | 0 | 0 | 0 | 0 | 0 | 0 | 0 | 0 |
| 2007 | DEN | 7 | 0 | 10 | 8 | 2 | 1.0 | 2 | 0 | 0 | 0 | 0 | 2 | 0 | 0 | 0 | 0 |
| 2008 | DEN | **16** | 1 | 24 | 15 | 9 | **3.0** | **4** | 0 | 0 | 0 | 0 | 1 | 1 | 0 | 0 | 0 |
| 2009 | DEN | **16** | **14** | **40** | **26** | **14** | 1.0 | 2 | 0 | 0 | 0 | 0 | 0 | 1 | 0 | 0 | 0 |
| | | 76 | 15 | 118 | 82 | 36 | 8.0 | 14 | 0 | 0 | 0 | 0 | 7 | 4 | 2 | 18 | 0 |

=== Playoffs ===
| Year | Team | Games | | Tackles | | | | | Interceptions | | | | | Fumbles | | | |
| Year | Team | GP | GS | Cmb | Solo | Ast | Sck | TFL | Int | Yds | TD | Lng | PD | FF | FR | Yds | TD |
|---|---|---|---|---|---|---|---|---|---|---|---|---|---|---|---|---|---|
| 2003 | GNB | **1** | 0 | 0 | 0 | 0 | 0.0 | 0 | 0 | 0 | 0 | 0 | 0 | 0 | 0 | 0 | 0 |
| 2004 | GNB | **1** | 0 | **3** | **2** | **1** | **1.0** | 0 | 0 | 0 | 0 | 0 | 0 | 0 | 0 | 0 | 0 |
| | | 2 | 0 | 3 | 2 | 1 | 1.0 | 0 | 0 | 0 | 0 | 0 | 0 | 0 | 0 | 0 | 0 |
