= Brian Xanders =

American football player, coach, executive (born 1971)

Jacksonville Jaguars
- Title: Senior personnel executive

Personal information
- Born: April 10, 1971 (age 55); East Stroudsburg, Pennsylvania, U.S.

Career information
- Position: Linebacker
- College: Florida State

Career history
- Atlanta Falcons (1994–2007) Player Personnel / Coaching / Football Operations; Denver Broncos (2008–2012); Assistant General Manager (2008); General Manager (2009-2012); Detroit Lions (2013–2016) Senior Personnel Executive; Los Angeles Rams (2017–2024) Senior Personnel Executive / Coaching Assistant; Jacksonville Jaguars (2025–present) Senior Advisor to GM/Personnel Strategist

Awards and highlights
- As an executive: Super Bowl champion (LVI)
- Executive profile at Pro Football Reference

Brian Xanders (born April 10, 1971) is an American football executive and former Florida State football player. He is the former general manager for the Denver Broncos of the National Football League (NFL), and currently serves as a Senior Personnel Executive for the NFL's Jacksonville Jaguars.

The 2023 season marks his 30th year in the NFL working in a variety of player personnel, scouting, football operations and coaching staff roles during his time at four teams (Los Angeles, Detroit, Denver and Atlanta). He has direct experience in player evaluations with the last 27 NFL Draft classes and 22 free agency periods.

== Playing career ==
A former linebacker who played for Bobby Bowden at Florida State University from 1989 to 1992, Xanders was a member of four bowl-winning teams with the Seminoles that had a 42-7 combined record.

He was an All-Atlantic Coast Conference academic team selection and graduated from FSU with a master's degree in Business Administration (MBA) and a bachelor's degree in Business Management.

== Executive career ==
=== Atlanta Falcons ===
Before joining the Broncos, he worked 14 seasons (1994-2008) with the Atlanta Falcons in various scouting, player personnel, football operations, coaching staff (defense/offense/ST) and technology/systems roles. Xanders was a member of the Falcons’ defensive coaching staff on their 1998 team that became the first in franchise history to earn a Super Bowl appearance (XXXIII).

He was selected by the Falcons to attend Stanford University's NFL Program for Managers in 2005, he has given presentations at several universities on NFL player personnel issues.

=== Denver Broncos ===
During his tenure as the Denver Broncos’ General Manager, he engineered the personnel transformation where 85 percent of the team's roster was overhauled after the 2008 NFL season. Those overall acquisitions ranked 2nd in pro personnel (AV) and 6th in college scouting (AV).

The Broncos executed high-producing NFL Draft classes from 2009 to 2012, with 22 primary starters (1+ year) on NFL teams from those draft classes, including six Pro Bowl players (22 appearances), with 12 All Pro designations ~

§ Linebacker Von Miller [2011 - 1st] 11-year starter, 8 Pro Bowls, 7 NFL All-Pro, NFL All-Decade Team, Super Bowl MVP, Defensive Rookie of the Year, 115 Sacks, 26 FF's, Super Bowl 50 MVP

§ Cornerback Chris Harris Jr. [2011 - CFA] 11-year starter, 4 Pro Bowls, 3 NFL All-Pro, NFL All-Decade Team, All-Rookie Team, 21 INT, 90 PBU's, Super Bowl 50 champion

§ Wide receiver Demaryius Thomas [2010 - 1st] 7-year starter, 5 Pro Bowls, 2 NFL All-Pro, 63 TD's, Super Bowl 50 champion

§ Tight end Julius Thomas [2011 - 4th] 5-year starter, 2 Pro Bowls, 36 TD's, 226 Receptions

§ Defensive tackle Malik Jackson [2012 - 5th] 10-year starter, 1 Pro Bowl, 36 Sacks, 58 TFL's, Super Bowl 50 champion

§ Offensive guard Zane Beadles [2010 - 2nd] 9-year starter, 1 Pro Bowl, 137 Games Played

§ Defensive end Derek Wolfe [2012 - 2nd] 8-year starter, 120 games played, 33 Sacks, 55 TFL's, Super Bowl 50 champion

§ Linebacker Danny Trevathan [2012 - 6th] 10-year starter, 700+ tackles, 27 TFL's, 39 PBU's, Super Bowl 50 champion

§ Offensive tackle Orlando Franklin [2011 - 2nd] 7-year starter, 46 AV

§ Wide receiver Eric Decker [2010 - 3rd] 6-year starter, 440 receptions, 53 TD's

§ Defensive end Robert Ayers [2009 - 1st] 4-year starter, 35 Sacks, 51 TFL's, 120 Games Played

§ Tight end Virgil Green [2011 - 7th] 10-year starter, 137 Games Played, 11.0 per reception, Super Bowl 50 champion

§ Free safety Rahim Moore [2011 - 2nd] 5-year starter, 64 Games Played, 9 INT's

§ Cornerback Perrish Cox [2010 - 5th] 4-year starter, 82 Games Played, 10 INT's, 50 PBU's

§ Center J. D. Walton [2010 - 3rd] 4-year starter, 56 Games Played, 22 AV

§ Running back Knowshon Moreno [2009 - 1st] 5-year starter, 3,600 Yards Rushing, 1,400 Yards Receiving

§ 6 additional players with 1-year as core starter

During 2009 to 2012, there were also eight other veteran Pro Bowl players (20 appearances) who were signed or extended during his tenure, with 10 All Pro designations (production at the Broncos, after signing) ~

§ Quarterback Peyton Manning [FA, 2012-15] Super Bowl 50 champion, 2-time AFC Champion, 2013 NFL MVP, 2-time All Pro, 3 Pro Bowls, 139 passing TDs, 1 rushing TD (2013 Week 5 @ Dallas Cowboys)

§ Strong safety Brian Dawkins [UFA, 2009-11] All Pro, 2 Pro Bowls, 22 PBU's and 235 Tackles at ages 36–38

§ Cornerback Champ Bailey [re-signed, 2011] All-Decade Team, All Pro, 4 Pro Bowls

§ Offensive tackle Ryan Clady [1st round, 2008] 3 All Pro, 3 Pro Bowls, Super Bowl 50 champion

§ Defensive end Elvis Dumervil [re-signed, 2010] All Pro, 3 Pro Bowls, NFL Sacks Leader (2009)

§ Wide receiver Brandon Lloyd [2009 Free agent signing, traded to St. Louis in 2011] All Pro, Pro Bowl, NFL Receiving Yards Leader (2010)

§ Wide receiver Brandon Marshall [re-signed, 2010] 3 Pro Bowls, 4,600+ Receiving Yards

§ Running back Willis McGahee [FA, 2011] Pro Bowl, 1,920 Rushing Yards and 9 TD's in 2 years

Xanders also supervised the day-to-day operations of the Broncos’ college scouting, pro scouting, labor operations/salary cap, equipment, medical, video, football systems and football operations departments.

He served on the NFL College Advisory, NFL Combine Selection and the NFL Statistics Committees. He was originally hired by Coach Mike Shanahan/Denver Broncos as assistant general manager in 2008.

=== Detroit Lions ===
With the Detroit Lions, the 4-year player personnel turnover in Detroit yielded the 3rd best era in Lions’ history, since 1930 (34 wins). He worked to improve player personnel communication and data flow, by assisting the rebuilding of all of the Lions' college and pro systems.

=== Los Angeles Rams ===
With the Los Angeles Rams, Xanders provided assistance in a multi-dimensional role blending the player personnel department and the coaching staff —— college, pro, systems, video, coaching research, game management strategy and 'next gen' innovations. Since 2017, there had been three successful roster reconstructions yielding five playoff seasons, a 77-49 [3rd] record, and the Super Bowl LVI championship.

=== Jacksonville Jaguars ===
On May 8, 2025, the Jacksonville Jaguars hired Xanders as a senior personnel executive.

== Personal life ==
Xanders resides with his wife and two children in Ponte Vedra Beach, Florida. He and his family participate in Habitat for Humanity charities, Homes for the Holidays, and Warrick Dunn Charities.
