= Darcel McBath =

American football player and coach (born 1985)

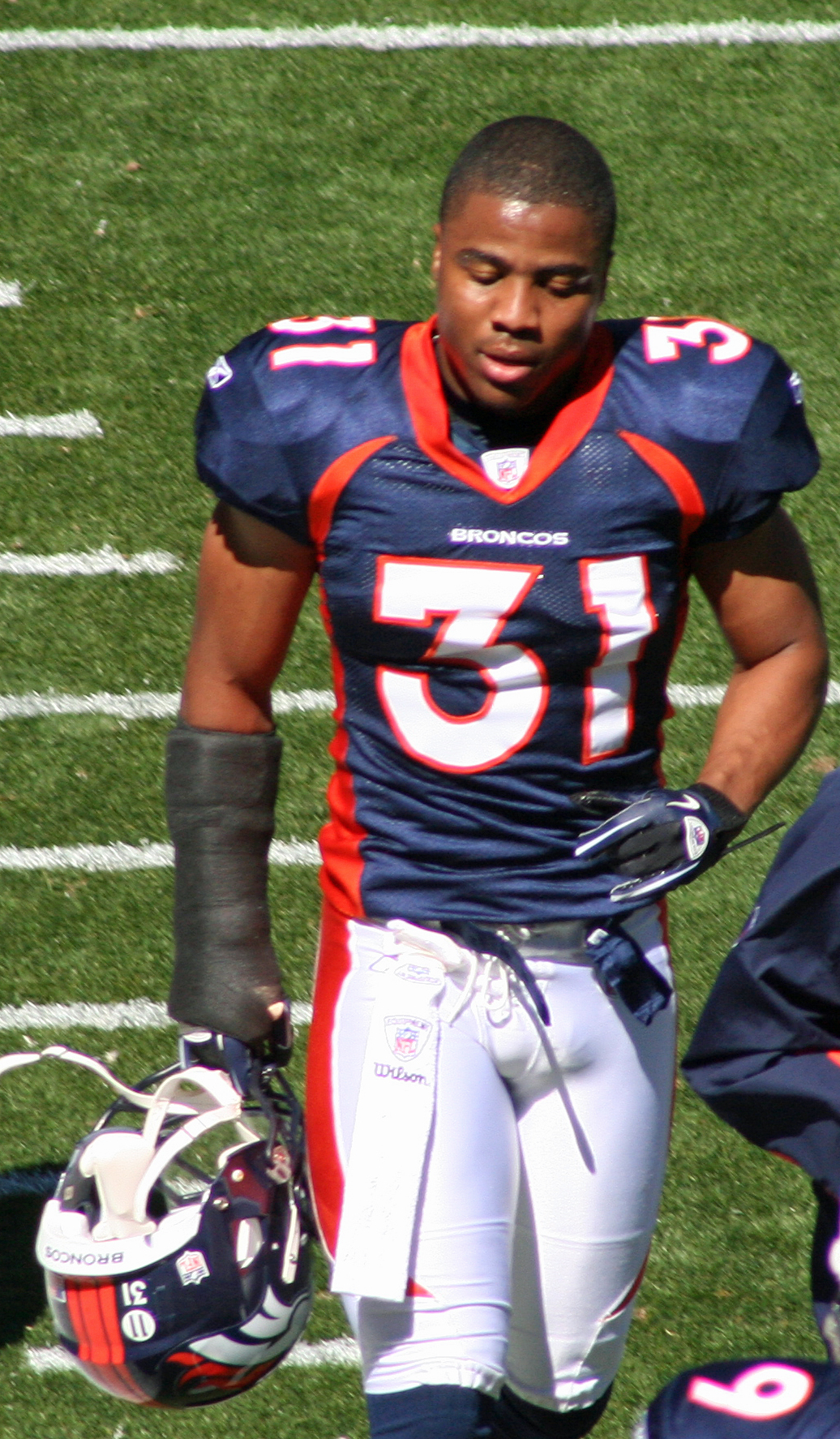
- McBath with the Denver Broncos in 2010

Texas Tech Red Raiders
- Title: Cornerbacks coach

Personal information
- Born: October 28, 1985 (age 41); Gainesville, Texas, U.S.
- Listed height: 6 ft 1 in (1.85 m)
- Listed weight: 198 lb (90 kg)

Career information
- Position: Defensive back (No. 31, 38, 28)
- High school: Gainesville
- College: Texas Tech
- NFL draft: 2009: 2nd round, 48th overall pick

Career history

Playing
- Denver Broncos (2009−2010); Jacksonville Jaguars (2011); San Francisco 49ers (2012)

Coaching
- North Texas (2016) Defensive quality control intern; Washington State (2017) Defensive quality control coach; Washington State (2018–2019) Cornerbacks coach; Washington State (2019) Interim co-defensive coordinator & cornerbacks coach; Mississippi State (2020–2023) Cornerbacks coach; Texas Tech (2024) Staff analyst; Texas Tech (2025–present) Cornerbacks coach

Awards and highlights
- First-team All-Big 12 (2008)

Career NFL statistics
- Total tackles: 52
- Fumble recoveries: 1
- Pass deflections: 4
- Interceptions: 2
- Stats at Pro Football Reference

Steven Darcel McBath (born October 28, 1985) is an American former professional football player who was a safety who is currently the cornerbacks coach at Texas Tech Red Raiders. He played college football for Texas Tech and was selected by the Denver Broncos in the second round of the 2009 NFL draft. McBath also played for the Jacksonville Jaguars and San Francisco 49ers.

== Early life ==
McBath was born in Gainesville, Texas. As a defensive back and wide receiver in high school, he led the Gainesville Leopards to a 2003 3A state football championship, a 35–24 win over a Burnet High School team, led by former third string Dallas Cowboys quarterback Stephen McGee and former Tampa Bay Buccaneers wide receiver Jordan Shipley.

== Professional career ==
=== Denver Broncos ===
The Broncos selected McBath in the second round (48th overall) of the 2009 NFL draft. On July 26, 2009, McBath signed a four-year, $3.85 million contract with $2.01 million guaranteed and base salaries of $310,000 in 2009, $395,000 in 2010, $480,000 in 2011, and $565,000 in 2012.

McBath played in 13 games during his rookie year, accumulating 26 tackles (22 solo and 4 assisted). In his second game, against the Cleveland Browns, McBath intercepted a pass by quarterback Brady Quinn for his first career interception. McBath's next interception was not until Week 14 against the Indianapolis Colts quarterback Peyton Manning. McBath suffered a broken forearm only a few plays later, and was placed on the injured reserve list for the rest of the season. On September 4, 2011, McBath was waived by Denver.

=== Jacksonville Jaguars ===
McBath was signed by the Jacksonville Jaguars on December 12, 2011 and later released on April 23, 2012.

=== San Francisco 49ers ===
McBath was signed by the San Francisco 49ers on July 23, 2012 to a one-year deal. Following the 2012 season, McBath and the 49ers appeared in Super Bowl XLVII. In the game, he recorded one tackle as the 49ers lost to the Baltimore Ravens, 34–31.

McBath re-signed with the 49ers to another one-year contract in 2013. On August 22, 2013, the 49ers placed McBath on injured reserve due to a foot injury he suffered in the second preseason game against the Kansas City Chiefs.

=== NFL statistics ===
Year	Team	GP	COMB	TOTAL	AST	SACK	FF	FR	FR YDS	INT	IR YDS	AVG IR	LNG	TD	PD
2009	DEN	13	26	22	4	0.0	0	0	0	2	28	14	25	0	3
2010	DEN	7	17	17	0	0.0	0	0	0	0	0	0	0	0	1
2011	JAX	1	2	1	1	0.0	0	0	0	0	0	0	0	0	0
2012	SF	16	7	5	2	0.0	0	1	8	0	0	0	0	0	0
Career		37	52	45	7	0.0	0	1	0	2	28	14	25	0	4

== Awards and honors ==
- 2007 Honorable Mention All-Big 12
- 2008 First-team All-Big 12

== Coaching career ==
In 2016, McBath was a defensive quality control intern for the North Texas Mean Green, primarily working with defensive backs. The following year, he joined Washington State's coaching staff, led by former Texas Tech head coach Mike Leach, as a defensive quality control assistant. He was elevated to cornerbacks coach in 2018, and served as interim defensive coordinator in 2019 after Tracy Claeys' resignation. In 2020, he was hired by Leach as the cornerbacks coach for the Mississippi State Bulldogs.

On May 15, 2024, McBath was hired as an analyst at his alma mater, Texas Tech.

On January 6, 2024, McBath was promoted to cornerback coach, Texas Tech
