= Wesley Woodyard =

American football player (born 1986)

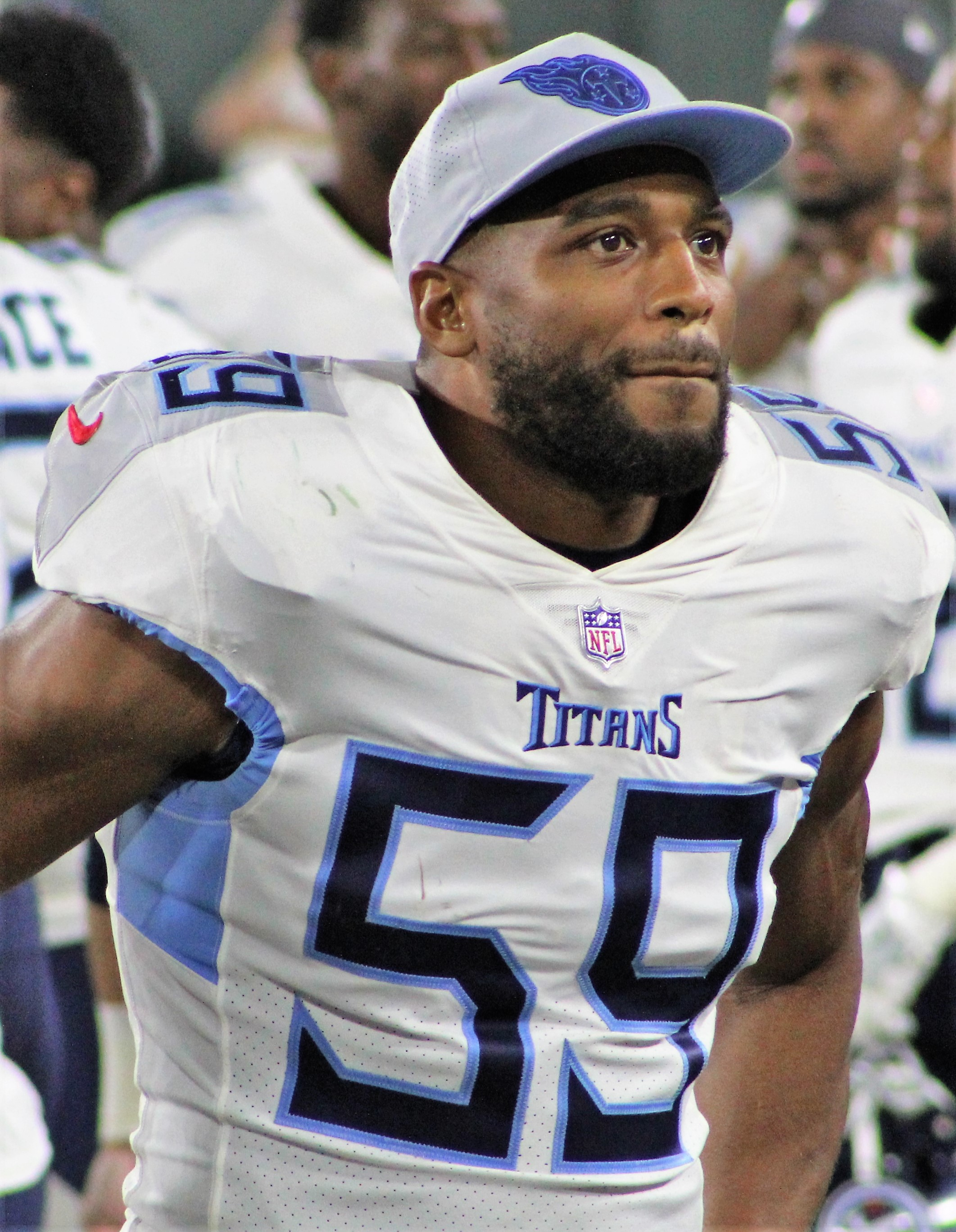
- Woodyard with the Tennessee Titans in 2018

No. 52, 59
- Position: Linebacker

Personal information
- Born: July 21, 1986 (age 40); LaGrange, Georgia, U.S.
- Listed height: 6 ft 0 in (1.83 m)
- Listed weight: 233 lb (106 kg)

Career information
- High school: LaGrange
- College: Kentucky (2004–2007)
- NFL draft: 2008: undrafted

Career history
- Denver Broncos (2008–2013); Tennessee Titans (2014–2019)

Awards and highlights
- 2× First-team All-SEC (2006, 2007)

Career NFL statistics
- Total tackles: 943
- Sacks: 28.0
- Pass deflections: 31
- Interceptions: 8
- Forced fumbles: 7
- Defensive touchdowns: 2
- Stats at Pro Football Reference

Wesley Woodyard Jr. (born July 21, 1986) is an American former professional football player who was a linebacker in the National Football League (NFL). He played college football for the Kentucky Wildcats and was signed as an undrafted free agent by the Denver Broncos in 2008. Woodyard also played for the Tennessee Titans.

== Early life ==
Woodyard was born in LaGrange, Georgia, and attended LaGrange High School. He was named the Georgia Class AAA Defensive Player of the Year by the Atlanta Journal-Constitution and was first-team all-state as a senior by the Georgia Sportswriters Association and the Journal-Constitution. As a four-year letterman and two-year starter at outside linebacker, the team posted a 51–3 record during his three seasons, winning a pair of state championships.

== College career ==
As a freshman at the University of Kentucky in 2004, Woodyard played in the first 10 games, and midway through the season, he switched from strong safety to inside linebacker. Woodyard recorded 34 tackles for the season and was selected for the Freshman All-SEC Team by SEC coaches. As a sophomore in 2005, he started all 11 games at linebacker. For the season, Woodyard recorded 100 tackles, seven for-a-loss, and four fumble recoveries. He was named second-team Sophomore All-American and All-SEC honorable mention.

As a junior in 2006, Woodyard started all 13 games at linebacker, leading the team with 122 tackles and tackles-for-loss with 9.5. For the season, he earned Defensive MVP honors in the Music City Bowl. As a senior in 2007, Woodyard started all 13 games at linebacker, leading the team with 139 tackles. He is a member of Omega Psi Phi fraternity.

== Professional career ==
Pre-draft measurables
Height	Weight	Arm length	Hand span	40-yard dash	10-yard split	20-yard split	20-yard shuttle	Three-cone drill	Vertical jump	Broad jump
6 ft 0 3/8 in (1.84 m)	227 lb (103 kg)	34 5/8 in (0.88 m)	9 3/4 in (0.25 m)	4.51 s	1.52 s	2.58 s	4.25 s	7.15 s	30 in (0.76 m)	9 ft 10 in (3.00 m)
All values are from NFL Combine

=== Denver Broncos ===
==== 2008 ====
On April 29, 2008, the Denver Broncos signed Woodyard to a three-year, $1.17 million contract that included a $20,000 signing bonus after he went undrafted in the 2008 NFL draft.

Throughout training camp, Woodyard competed for a job as an outside linebacker against Boss Bailey, Nate Webster, Jamie Winborn, Louis Green, Jordan Beck, and Spencer Larsen. Head coach Mike Shanahan named Woodyard the backup weakside linebacker behind D. J. Williams to start the regular season.

Woodyard made his NFL debut in the season-opener at the Oakland Raiders and recorded a solo tackle during the 41–14 victory. On November 6, 2008, Woodyard earned his first NFL start in place of D. J. Williams who sustained a knee injury. He finished the 34–30 victory at the Cleveland Browns with a season-high ten combined tackles. On December 31, 2008, the Denver Broncos fired Mike Shanahan after the Broncos finished with an 8–8 record and did not qualify for the playoffs. Woodyard finished his rookie season with 55 combined tackles (47 solo) and a pass deflection in 16 games and six starts.

==== 2009 ====
The Broncos new defensive coordinator Mike Nolan opted to convert to a base 3-4 defense, using four linebackers instead of three. Woodyard competed against Mario Haggan, Braxton Kelley, and Lee Robinson for a roster spot as a backup inside linebacker. Head coach Josh McDaniels named Woodyard the backup inside linebacker behind D. J. Williams and Andra Davis to start the regular season. On September 10, Woodyard was named the special teams captain by his teammates for the 2009 season.

On September 13, Woodyard recorded three combined tackles, broke up a pass, and intercepted a pass by quarterback Carson Palmer as the Broncos won 12–7 at the Cincinnati Bengals. In Week 9, he collected a season-high eight combined tackles during a 28–10 loss to the Pittsburgh Steelers. Woodyard finished his second NFL season with 44 combined tackles (32 solo), two pass deflections, and an interception in 16 games and 16 starts.

==== 2010 ====
Throughout training camp, Woodyard competed for a job as a backup inside linebacker against Akin Ayodele, Joe Mays, and Nick Greisen. Josh McDaniels named him the backup inside linebacker behind D. J. Williams and Joe Mays.

Woodyard was a healthy scratch for the Broncos' Week 2 victory against the Seattle Seahawks. On September 20, Woodyard was featured in a press conference held by the Broncos after their wide receiver Kenny McKinley committed suicide the day prior. He was inactive for their Week 4 victory at the Tennessee Titans after sustaining a hamstring injury. Woodyard also missed three consecutive games (Weeks 6–8) after he aggravated his hamstring injury. On November 14, 2010, Woodyard earned his first career start and recorded two solo tackles during a 49–29 win against the Kansas City Chiefs. On December 6, the Broncos fired McDaniels after they lost at the Kansas City Chiefs and fell to a 3–9 record. In Week 16, he made his second NFL start and collected a season-high nine combined tackles in the Broncos' 24–23 win against the Houston Texans. The following week, Woodyard recorded five solo tackles and made his first NFL sack on quarterback Philip Rivers during the Broncos' 33–28 loss to the San Diego Chargers. Woodyard finished the 2010 season with 37 combined tackles (33 solo) and one sack in 11 games and three starts.

==== 2011 ====
On July 29, 2011, the Broncos signed Woodyard to a one-year, $1.85 million contract. He was voted as the special teams captain for the third consecutive year. Woodyard competed against D. J. Williams, Lee Robinson, and Braxton Kelley for the role as the starting weakside linebacker. He was moved to outside linebacker after new Broncos' defensive coordinator Don Martindale opted to switch to a base 4-3 defense. Head coach John Fox named Woodyard the starting weakside linebacker to start the regular season after D. J. Williams suffered a dislocated elbow and was projected to miss 3-4 games.

On September 18, 2011, Woodyard recorded a season-high 13 combined tackles (ten solo) and broke up a pass during their 24–22 victory against the Cincinnati Bengals. The following week, he collected a ten combined tackles (seven solo) during a 17–14 loss at the Tennessee Titans. He was demoted back to backup outside linebacker after Williams returned from injury in Week 5. Woodyard missed the Broncos' Week 10 victory at the Kansas City Chiefs after he sustained a shoulder injury the previous week. He finished the 2011 season with 97 combined tackles (67 solo) and two pass deflections in 15 games and seven starts.

==== 2012 ====
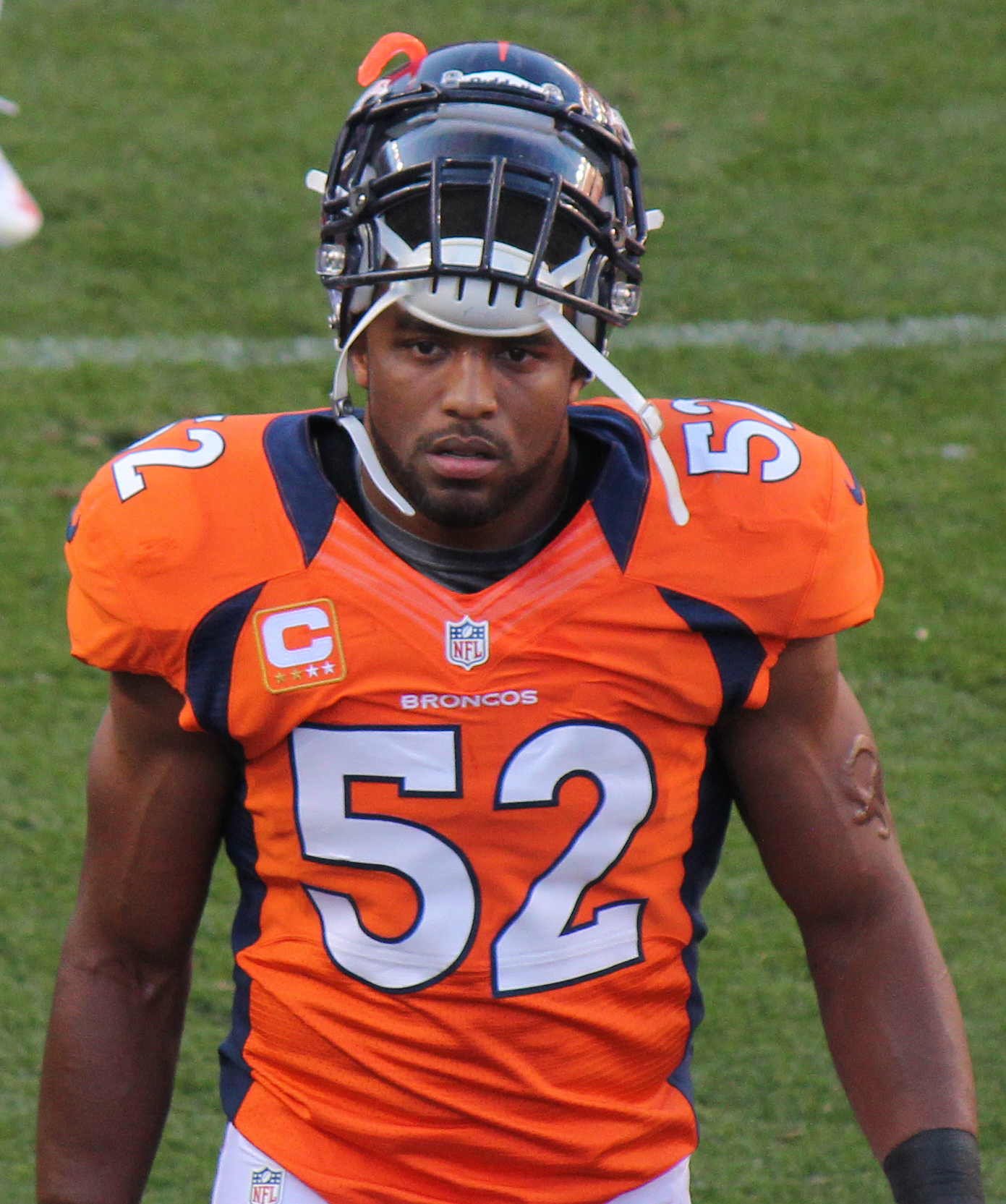
Woodyard in 2012

On May 19, 2012, the Denver Broncos signed Woodyard to a two-year, $3.5 million contract. Woodyard entered training camp slated as the starting weakside linebacker after D. J. Williams was suspended for six games for failing a test for performance-enhancing drugs. He faced minor competition from Danny Trevathan, Cyril Obiozor, and Mike Mohamed.

Woodyard started the Broncos' season-opener against the Pittsburgh Steelers and recorded a career-high 12 solo tackles and sacked Ben Roethlisberger during their 31–19 victory. On October 28, 2012, Woodyard collected a season-high 13 combined tackles (nine solo), two pass deflections, a sack, and intercepted a pass by Drew Brees during the Broncos' 34–14 win against the New Orleans Saints. The following week, Woodyard recorded a season-high 14 combined tackles (four solo) in the Broncos' 31–23 win at the Cincinnati Bengals. Woodyard was inactive for the Broncos' Week 14 victory at the Oakland Raiders due to an ankle injury he sustained the previous game. In Week 16, he collected eight combined tackles and a season-high 1.5 sacks as Denver defeated the Cleveland Browns 34–12. He finished the 2012 season with a career-high 117 combined tackles (73 solo), six pass deflections, 5.5 sacks, and a career-high three interceptions in 15 games and 14 starts.

The Broncos finished the 2012 season atop the AFC West with a 13–3 record, clinching a playoff berth and first-round bye. On January 12, 2013, Woodyard started in his first NFL playoff game and recorded seven solo tackles in the Broncos' 38–35 loss to the Baltimore Ravens in the AFC Divisional round.

==== 2013 ====
Woodyard entered training camp slated as the starting weakside linebacker. On August 20, 2013, starting strongside linebacker Von Miller was suspended for the first six games for violating the league's substance abuse policy. Defensive coordinator Jack Del Rio shifted middle linebacker Nate Irving to Miller's strongside linebacker position and had Woodyard take over as the middle linebacker. Head coach John Fox officially named Woodyard the starting middle linebacker to start the regular season, along with outside linebackers Nate Irving and Danny Trevathan.

Woodyard suffered a neck injury during the Broncos' Week 5 win at the Dallas Cowboys and was unable to play in the next two games (Weeks 6–7). On November 24, 2013, Woodyard recorded a season-high 15 combined tackles (seven solo) during a 34–31 loss at the New England Patriots. The following week, he collected five solo tackles, broke up a pass, and intercepted a pass by Alex Smith during their 35–28 victory at the Kansas City Chiefs. After a string of poor performances, Woodyard was benched in favor of veteran Paris Lenon for the last four games of the season. He finished the 2013 season with 84 combined tackles (48 solo), four pass deflections, 1.5 sacks, and an interception in 14 games and ten starts. The Broncos selected him for the team's Walter Payton Man of the Year Award for 2013.

The Broncos finished atop the AFC West with a 13–3 record, clinching a first-round and home-field advantage. They went on to Super Bowl XLVIII after they defeated the San Diego Chargers in the AFC Divisional Round and the New England Patriots in the AFC Championship. On February 2, 2014, Woodyard made three combined tackles as the Broncos were routed 43–8 to the Seattle Seahawks in Super Bowl XLVIII.

==== 2014 ====
Woodyard became an unrestricted free agent in 2014 and attended visits with the New England Patriots and Tennessee Titans, while also receiving interest from the Dallas Cowboys and Baltimore Ravens. He stated that his original intent was to stay with the Broncos, but Woodyard did not receive a contract offer from them.

=== Tennessee Titans ===
On March 14, 2014, the Tennessee Titans signed Woodyard to a four-year, $15.75 million contract that included $4.75 million guaranteed and a $3 million signing bonus.

==== 2014 ====
Head coach Ken Whisenhunt named Woodyard the starting left inside linebacker opposite Zaviar Gooden and along with outside linebackers Kamerion Wimbley and Derrick Morgan.

Woodyard made his Titans debut in their season-opener at the Kansas City Chiefs and recorded five solo tackles and sacked Alex Smith during a 26–10 victory. On September 27, 2014, Woodyard recorded a season-high nine combined tackles, broke up two passes, and intercepted a pass by Andrew Luck during their 41–17 loss at the Indianapolis Colts. He finished the 2014 season with 94 combined tackles (53 solo), three pass deflections, 2.5 sacks, and two interceptions in 16 games and starts.

==== 2015 ====
Throughout training camp, Woodyard competed against Avery Williamson, Zach Brown, and Zaviar Gooden for a job as the starting inside linebacker. Head coach Ken Whisenhunt named Woodyard the backup inside linebacker behind Avery Williamson and Zach Brown to start the regular season.

During Week 2, Woodyard made two solo tackles, sacked quarterback Johnny Manziel, and forced a fumble in a 28–14 loss at the Cleveland Browns. He was promoted to the starting lineup ahead of Zach Brown prior to the Titans' Week 4 matchup against the Buffalo Bills. On October 18, 2015, Woodyard recorded a season-high ten combined tackles (eight solo) and sacked quarterback Ryan Tannehill during a 38–10 loss to the Miami Dolphins. On November 4, 2015, the Titans fired head coach Ken Whisenhunt after they fell to a 1–6 record. Tight ends coach Mike Mularkey was named the interim head coach for the remainder of the season. Woodyard finished the 2015 season with 87 combined tackles (54 solo) and five sacks in 16 games and 14 starts.

==== 2016 ====
Woodyard entered training camp slated as the starting left inside linebacker after Zach Brown departed for the Buffalo Bills in free agency. Defensive coordinator Dick LeBeau named Woodyard the starting inside linebacker with Avery Williamson and outside linebackers Brian Orakpo and Derrick Morgan.

During Week 12, Woodyard recorded five solo tackles, a career-high three pass deflections, and intercepted a pass by Matt Barkley during a 27–21 victory at the Chicago Bears. On January 1, 2017, he collected a season-high six combined tackles in a 24–17 victory against the Houston Texans. He finished the season with 57 combined tackles (42 solo), five pass deflections, two sacks, and an interception in 16 games and ten starts. He shared time with Sean Spence who started the other six games in place of Woodyard.

==== 2017 ====
On March 15, 2017, the Titans signed Woodyard to a three-year, $10.5 million extension that includes $2 million guaranteed.

Head coach Mike Mularkey named Woodyard the starting inside linebacker after Sean Spence departed for the Indianapolis Colts in free agency. During Week 9, he recorded a season-high 14 combined tackles (nine solo) and broke up a pass in a narrow 23–20 victory over the Baltimore Ravens. During Week 15, he collected ten combined tackles (seven solo) and a sack in a 25–23 road loss against the San Francisco 49ers.

Woodyard finished the 2017 season with a career-high 124 combined tackles (84 solo), five pass deflections, and five sacks in 16 games and starts.

==== 2018 ====
During a 34–10 Week 10 victory over the New England Patriots, Woodyard registered 10 tackles and 1.5 sacks. This effort earned him AFC Defensive Player of the Week.

Woodyard finished the 2018 season with 113 tackles, 4.5 sacks, two pass deflections, and a fumble recovery in 14 games and starts.

==== 2019 ====
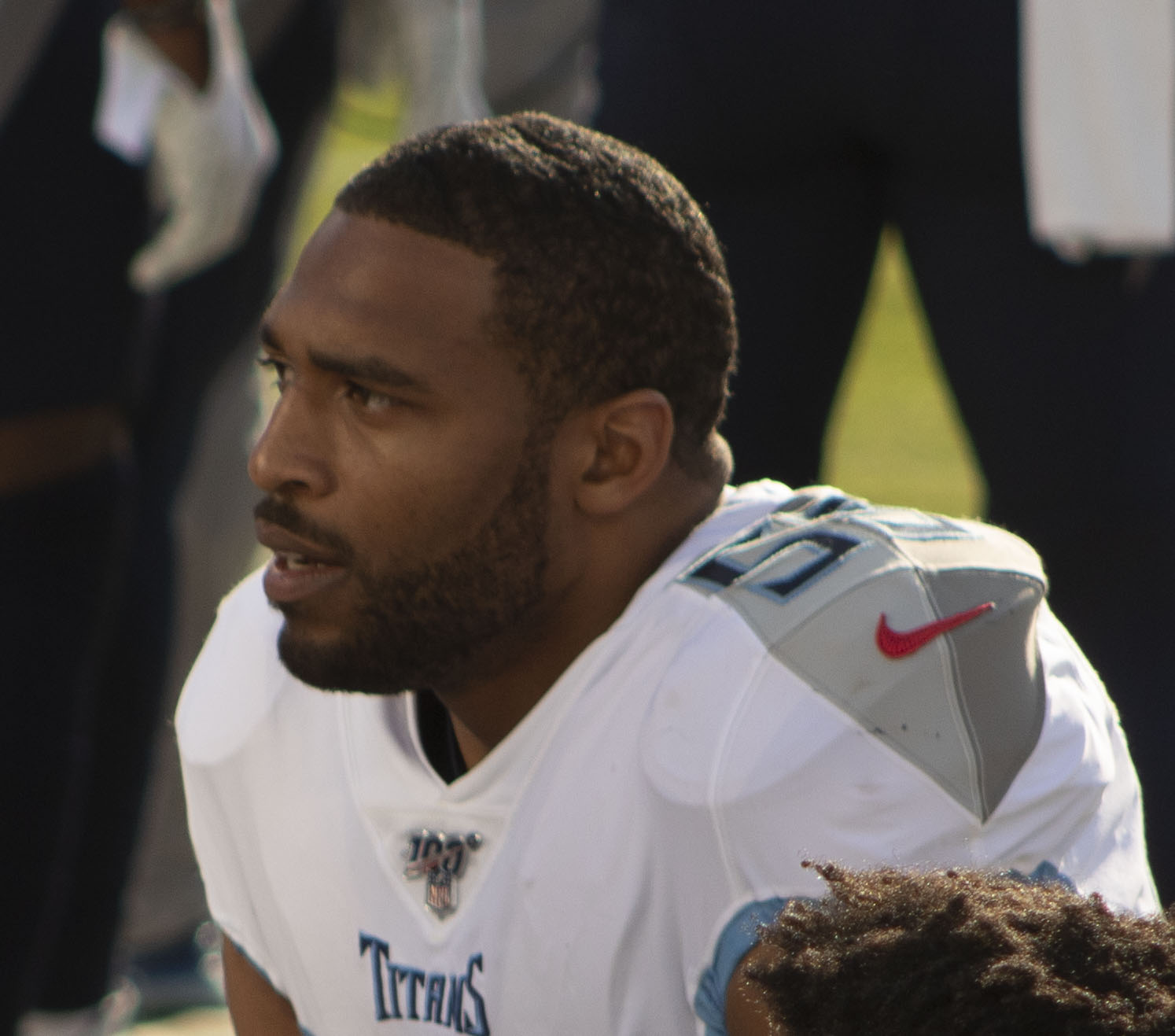
Woodyard in 2019

During Week 7 against the Los Angeles Chargers, Woodyard recorded six tackles and a forced fumble in the 23–20 win. Woodyard's forced fumble occurred late in the fourth quarter when he stripped the football from Melvin Gordon on the goal line and teammate Jurrell Casey made the recovery.

Woodyard's role decreased in 2019 due to the emergence of second-year linebackers Rashaan Evans and Harold Landry. He finished the season with 42 tackles, a sack, a forced fumble, and a pass deflection in 15 games and two starts.

== NFL career statistics ==
=== Regular season ===
Year	Team	Games		Tackles				Fumbles				Interceptions					
Year	Team	GP	GS	Cmb	Solo	Ast	Sck	FF	FR	Yds	TD	Int	Yds	Avg	Lng	TD	PD
2008	DEN	16	6	55	47	8	0.0	0	0	0	0	0	0	0.0	0	0	1
2009	DEN	16	0	46	38	8	0.0	1	0	0	0	1	0	0.0	0	0	2
2010	DEN	11	3	24	20	4	1.0	0	0	0	0	0	0	0.0	0	0	0
2011	DEN	15	7	90	60	30	0.0	2	0	0	0	0	0	0.0	0	0	2
2012	DEN	15	14	114	70	44	5.5	1	1	12	0	3	40	13.3	25	0	6
2013	DEN	14	10	91	52	39	1.5	3	0	0	1	0	0	0.0	0	0	4
2014	TEN	16	16	94	53	41	2.5	0	0	0	0	2	20	10.0	13	0	3
2015	TEN	16	12	84	51	33	5.0	1	1	3	1	0	0	0.0	0	0	0
2016	TEN	16	10	53	39	14	2.0	0	0	0	0	1	21	21.0	21	0	5
2017	TEN	16	16	121	81	40	5.0	0	2	4	1	0	0	0.0	0	0	5
2018	TEN	14	14	113	69	44	4.5	0	1	0	0	0	0	0.0	0	0	2
2019	TEN	15	2	42	25	17	1.0	1	0	0	0	0	0	0.0	0	0	1
Career		180	110	951	627	324	28.0	8	5	19	2	8	81	14.7	25	0	31

=== Postseason ===
Year	Team	Games		Tackles				Fumbles				Interceptions					
Year	Team	GP	GS	Cmb	Solo	Ast	Sck	FF	FR	Yds	TD	Int	Yds	Avg	Lng	TD	PD
2011	DEN	2	0	1	1	0	0.0	0	0	0	0	0	0	0.0	0	0	0
2012	DEN	1	1	7	7	0	0.0	0	0	0	0	0	0	0.0	0	0	0
2013	DEN	3	0	7	4	3	0.0	0	0	0	0	0	0	0.0	0	0	0
2017	TEN	2	2	16	8	8	0.5	0	0	0	0	0	0	0.0	0	0	0
2019	TEN	3	0	11	10	1	0.0	0	0	0	0	0	0	0.0	0	0	0
Career		11	3	42	30	12	0.5	0	0	0	0	0	0	0.0	0	0	0

== Personal life ==
Woodyard is a Christian. He and his wife, Veronica, have four kids.

In September 2016, Woodyard was part of a viral video. Woodyard, decked out in full uniform, picked up a young boy encouraging the Titans prior to the team's game against the Detroit Lions and carried him a few steps. The video has spread across social media and it was shown on NFL Network soon after. Regarding his kind gesture, Woodyard told Titans Online: "I have a son, and it just touched my heart, seeing the kid there. That’s the thing about this game of football, it allows us to bring each other together. It doesn’t matter about the skin color, race, or anything, money. We are all the same, we all enjoy Sundays, and to me that was special, seeing the kid in the tunnel.”

Woodyard was inducted into the Kentucky Pro Football Hall of Fame in 2018.
