= Kevin Mathis =

American football player and coach (born 1974)

Colorado Buffaloes
- Title: Cornerbacks coach

Personal information
- Born: April 29, 1974 (age 52); Gainesville, Texas, U.S.
- Listed height: 5 ft 9 in (1.75 m)
- Listed weight: 185 lb (84 kg)

Career information
- High school: Gainesville
- College: Texas A&M–Commerce
- NFL draft: 1997: undrafted

Career history

Playing
- Dallas Cowboys (1997–1999); New Orleans Saints (2000–2001); Atlanta Falcons (2002–2006)

Coaching
- Trinity Christian School (TX) (2017–2018) Defensive backs coach; Trinity Christian School (TX) (2019–2020) Defensive coordinator; Jackson State (2020–2022) Defensive backs coach; Colorado (2023–present) Cornerbacks coach

Awards and highlights
- 3× Division II All-American (1994, 1995, 1996); 3× All-LSC (1994, 1995, 1996)

Career NFL statistics
- Tackles: 365
- Interceptions: 11
- Forced fumbles: 9
- Passes defended: 33
- Stats at Pro Football Reference

Kevin Bryant Mathis (born April 29, 1974) is an American football coach and former cornerback in the National Football League (NFL). He currently serves as the cornerbacks coach for the University of Colorado. During his career as a player, Mathis played for the Dallas Cowboys, New Orleans Saints, and Atlanta Falcons. He played college football at Texas A&M University–Commerce.

== Early life ==
Mathis was born in Gainesville, Texas, and attended Gainesville High School, where he lettered in football, basketball, and track. In football, he was a two-time All-District selection.

He accepted a football scholarship from Texas A&M University-Commerce. As a redshirt freshman, he was a backup cornerback, tallying 64 tackles, 3 interceptions, 11 passes defensed and 4 fumble recoveries. As a sophomore he was named a starter at cornerback, registering 57 tackles, 3 interceptions, 13 passes defensed and 3 forced fumbles

As a junior, he collected 55 tackles, 6 interceptions and 16 passes defensed, while having 26 punt returns for a 10.4-yard average and 11 kickoff returns for a 24.6-yard average.

As a senior, he recorded 48 tackles (2 for loss), 4 interceptions, 17 passes defensed and one sack. He led the team with 16 punt returns for a 9.7-yard average and 15 kickoff returns for a 24.9-yard average.

In 2009, he was inducted into the Texas A&M-Commerce Athletic Hall of Fame.

== Professional career ==
=== Dallas Cowboys ===
Mathis was signed as an undrafted free agent by the Dallas Cowboys after the 1997 NFL draft, after dropping because of his size and small college background. He would end up making the team after taking advantage of Deion Sanders being away while playing professional baseball and displaying his track speed (4.19 seconds in the 40-yard dash). As a rookie, he played in all 16 games, recorded 23 tackles, 5 passes defensed, one forced fumble, one fumble recovery, 12 special teams tackles and also returned punts. He started the final 3 contests at right cornerback, following Sanders' season ending rib fracture injury.

In 1998, he was moved to the left side to backup Kevin Smith. At the end of the season, he passed an injured Smith on the depth chart, starting the final 4 games of the season and the wild card playoff loss against the Arizona Cardinals. He also established himself as one of the more productive kickoff returners in the league, averaging 24.8 yards to finish ranked sixth in the NFC. He posted 41 tackles, 2 interceptions, 8 passes defensed, one forced fumble, 2 fumble recoveries and special teams tackles. He missed 3 games with a broken right forearm.

In 1999, he would miss 8 games because of knee and hamstring injuries. He had 4 starts, but was mostly a backup behind Smith and Charlie Williams.

In 2000, the Cowboys had a lot of turnover at linebacker and one of the moves made to improve the depth was trading Mathis to the New Orleans Saints in exchange for linebacker Chris Bordano on April 26. Also factoring in the decision was his injury history and the numbers at the cornerback position (signing of Ryan McNeil and 3 rookie cornerbacks draft selections).

=== New Orleans Saints ===
Mathis was named the starter at left cornerback for all 16 games in the 2000 season and finished with 87 tackles and 1 interception. He helped the New Orleans Saints reach the playoffs for the first time since 1992 and also win their first ever playoff game.

As a starter in the 2001 season, he injured his cervical spine while tackling the Washington Redskins' Ki-Jana Carter. On July 24, 2002, he was waived injured.

=== Atlanta Falcons ===
On September 17, 2002, Mathis was signed as a free agent by the Atlanta Falcons. He played 11 games in the nickel packages, registering a career-high 3 interceptions. He started 12 games in 2004, finishing with 67 tackles and 2 interceptions (both returned for touchdowns).

During the 2005 season opener, about 40 minutes before kickoff between the Falcons and Philadelphia Eagles, Mathis and Eagles' linebacker Jeremiah Trotter got into a fight during pregame warmups. After officials reviewed video to see who instigated the fight, both Trotter and Mathis were ejected before kickoff. Terry Bradshaw said about the incident, "No one's been thrown out of a house that fast since my last divorce". The fight led to an NFL rules change where non-kickers cannot enter a neutral zone between the 45-yard-lines prior to the game.

On September 13, 2005, he was lost for the season with a career-threatening left knee injury, after tearing 3 ligaments during a practice drill.

The next year, he returned to play but suffered a career-ending neck injury, while tackling Eddie Drummond on the opening kickoff against the Detroit Lions on November 5, 2006. He was released injured on April 9, 2007.

== NFL career statistics ==
Legend
	Led the league
**Bold**	Career high

=== Regular season ===
Year	Team	Games		Tackles				Interceptions				Fumbles			
Year	Team	GP	GS	Comb	Solo	Ast	Sck	Int	Yds	TD	Lng	FF	FR	Yds	TD
1997	DAL	16	3	16	15	1	0.0	0	0	0	0	0	2	0	0
1998	DAL	13	4	32	28	4	**1.0**	2	0	0	0	2	**4**	**6**	0
1999	DAL	8	4	14	11	3	0.0	0	0	0	0	0	1	0	0
2000	NOR	16	16	**79**	**64**	**15**	0.0	1	0	0	0	2	0	0	0
2001	NOR	14	13	77	63	14	**1.0**	2	34	0	23	**3**	0	0	0
2002	ATL	11	0	20	19	1	0.0	**3**	21	0	13	0	1	0	0
2003	ATL	14	3	39	34	5	**1.0**	1	32	1	32	1	2	**6**	0
2004	ATL	15	12	65	60	5	0.0	2	**101**	**2**	**66**	0	0	0	0
2006	ATL	8	0	23	21	2	**1.0**	0	0	0	0	1	0	0	0
		115	55	365	315	50	4.0	11	188	3	66	9	10	12	0

=== Playoffs ===
Year	Team	Games		Tackles				Interceptions				Fumbles			
Year	Team	GP	GS	Comb	Solo	Ast	Sck	Int	Yds	TD	Lng	FF	FR	Yds	TD
1998	DAL	1	1	8	**8**	0	0.0	**1**	0	0	0	0	0	0	0
1999	DAL	1	0	0	0	0	0.0	0	0	0	0	0	0	0	0
2000	NOR	2	2	**9**	6	**3**	0.0	0	0	0	0	0	0	0	0
2002	ATL	2	0	0	0	0	0.0	0	0	0	0	0	0	0	0
2004	ATL	1	1	0	0	0	0.0	0	0	0	0	0	0	0	0
		7	4	17	14	3	0.0	1	0	0	0	0	0	0	0

== Coaching career ==
In 2012, he became a football assistant coach at Prime Prep Academy. In 2020 he joined Jackson State University as the defensive backs coach.

In December 2022, Mathis followed Sanders to the University of Colorado Boulder to be the defensive backs coach for the Colorado Buffaloes.
