= Gainesville Independent School District =

School district in Texas

Address
- 800 S Morris St Gainesville, Texas, 76240; United States

District information
- Grades: Pre-Kindergarten - 12th
- Superintendent: Dr. DesMontes Stewart

Students and staff
- Enrollment: ≈ 3,000
- Faculty: 198 (S/T Ratio - 14.4:1)

Other information
- Telephone: (940) 665-4362
- Fax: (940) 668-0354
- Website: Gainesville Independent School District

The Gainesville Independent School District is a public school district in Cooke County, Texas, United States, based in Gainesville, Texas. For the 2015-2016 school year, the academic performance report issued by the Texas Education Agency for GISD declared the school district as having "met standard", the highest rating schools can earn on the State of Texas' accountability system.

== Superintendents ==
Recent Superintendents have been Dr. Desmontes Stewart (2018–present), Dr. Jeffrey "Jeff" Brasher (2011-2018); William "Bill" Gravitt (2007-2011); Dr. Charles A. Luke (2005-2007); Mike Rosenberg (1998-2005); Dr. Thomas Meyers (1993-1998); and Charles "Charlie" Uselton (1988-1993).

== Schools ==
The Gainesville Independent School District has one pre-school (Head Start), two elementary schools, one intermediate school, one junior high (middle school), and one high school.

=== Pre-School (Head Start) ===
- Gainesville Head Start

=== Elementary schools ===
- Edison Elementary School (Pre-Kindergarten-1st Grade)
- W.E. Chalmers Elementary School (2nd Grade - 4th Grade)

=== Robert.E.Lee Intermediate School ===
- Gainesville Intermediate School (5th & 6th Grade)

=== Junior High School (Middle School) ===
- Gainesville Junior High School (7th & 8th Grade)

=== High school ===
- Gainesville High School (9th Grade - 12 Grade)

Gainesville High School also serves students living in the Walnut Bend Independent School District, which does not have a high school of its own.
