= Gainesville High School (Texas) =

Location
- 2201 South IH-35; Gainesville, Texas 76240; United States; 33.6045°N 97.1615°W

Information
- School type: Public high school
- School district: Gainesville Independent School District
- Principal: David Glancy
- Staff: 59.75 (FTE)
- Grades: 9-12
- Enrollment: 872 (2023–2024)
- Student to teacher ratio: 14.59
- Colors: Red, Black & White
- Athletics conference: UIL Class AAAA (4A)
- Mascot: Leopard/Lady Leopard
- Website: Gainesville High School website

Gainesville High School is a public high school located in Gainesville, Texas, United States. It is part of the Gainesville Independent School District located in north central Cooke County and classified as a 4A-Division 1 school by the UIL. In 2015, the school was rated "Met Standard" by the Texas Education Agency.

== Academics ==
In 2013, Gainesville High School was runner up in the district 9-3A competition.

== Athletics ==
The Gainesville Leopards compete in the following sports:

- Baseball
- Basketball
- Cross Country
- Football
- Golf
- Fishing
- Powerlifting
- Soccer
- Softball
- Tennis
- Track and Field
- Volleyball

=== State titles ===
- Football
  - 2003(3A/D1)
- Boys Basketball
  - 2002(3A)

State Runner Up:

- Football - 1974(3A), 1976(3A), 1978(3A), 2005(3A/D1),
- Boys Basketball - 2000(3A)
- Boys Soccer - 2025(4A/D1)

== Notable alumni ==
- Lew Allen, United States Air Force 4-Star General, 10th Chief of Staff of the U.S. Air Force, and 8th Director of the National Security Agency
- Rod Brown, NCAA All-American former NFL/CFL player
- Kevin Mathis, former NFL player
- Darcel McBath, former NFL player
- David Moore, NFL wide receiver for the Carolina Panthers
