= David Lockwood =

David Lockwood or Dave Lockwood may refer to:

- David Lockwood (sociologist) (1929–2014), British sociologist
- David J. Lockwood (before 1964), Canadian physicist
- Dave Lockwood (tiddlywinks) (born 1952/1953), American champion
- Dave Lockwood, a character in The Change-Up
