= Marquez Branson =

American football player (born 1987)

No. 85
- Position: Tight end

Personal information
- Born: February 14, 1987 (age 39); Palmdale, California, U.S.
- Listed height: 6 ft 2 in (1.88 m)
- Listed weight: 241 lb (109 kg)

Career information
- College: East Mississippi CC (2005–2006); Central Arkansas (2007–2008)
- NFL draft: 2009: undrafted

Career history
- Denver Broncos (2009–2010)*; Atlanta Falcons (2010–2011)*
- * Offseason or practice squad member only

Awards and highlights
- First-team All-Southland (2008)
- Stats at Pro Football Reference

Marquez Branson (born February 14, 1987) is an American former football tight end. He was signed by the Denver Broncos as an undrafted free agent in 2009. He played college football at Central Arkansas.

Branson was also a member of the Atlanta Falcons.

== Professional career ==
=== Atlanta Falcons ===
Branson was signed to the Atlanta Falcons' practice squad on October 28, 2010. The team signed him to a reserve/future contract on January 18, 2011. He was waived on September 2, and re-signed to the Falcons' practice squad three days later. On September 15, Branson was placed on the practice squad injured list.
