= Robert Ayers =

American football player (born 1985)

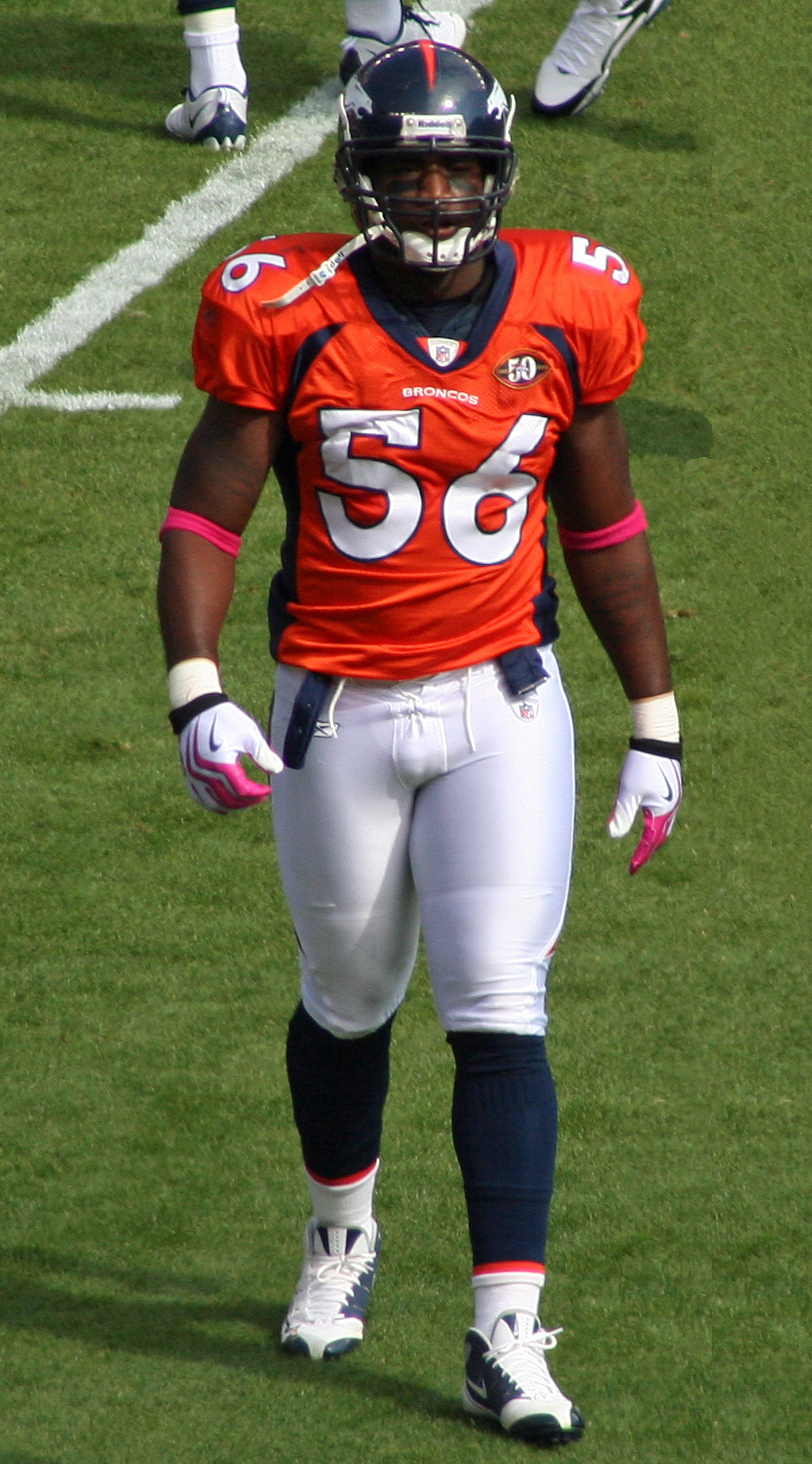
- Ayers with the Denver Broncos in 2009

No. 56, 91
- Position: Defensive end

Personal information
- Born: September 6, 1985 (age 41); Jersey City, New Jersey, U.S.
- Listed height: 6 ft 3 in (1.91 m)
- Listed weight: 275 lb (125 kg)

Career information
- High school: Bennettsville (SC) Marlboro
- College: Tennessee (2004–2008)
- NFL draft: 2009: 1st round, 18th overall pick

Career history
- Denver Broncos (2009–2013); New York Giants (2014–2015); Tampa Bay Buccaneers (2016–2017); Detroit Lions (2018)*
- * Offseason or practice squad member only

Awards and highlights
- First team All-SEC (2008)

Career NFL statistics
- Total tackles: 265
- Sacks: 34.5
- Forced fumbles: 9
- Fumble recoveries: 3
- Pass deflections: 12
- Defensive touchdowns: 1
- Stats at Pro Football Reference

Robert Ayers (born September 6, 1985) is an American former professional football player who was a defensive end for 10 years in the National Football League (NFL). He played college football for the Tennessee Volunteers and was selected by the Denver Broncos in the first round of the 2009 NFL draft. He also played for the New York Giants and Tampa Bay Buccaneers.

== Early life ==
Ayers was born in Jersey City, New Jersey. He spent part of his freshman year at Hoboken High School in 1999–2000 before moving to Clio, South Carolina, where he attended Marlboro County High School in Bennettsville. He was an All-State linebacker and was selected to play in the 2003 Shrine Bowl as a senior. That season, he recorded 112 tackles and intercepted five passes. As a junior, he had 94 tackles, eight sacks, and three interceptions. In addition to football, he also lettered twice in track as a sprinter, running the 100-meter dash and 4 x 100 metres relay.

== College career ==
Ayers began at the University of Tennessee as a redshirt outside linebacker in 2004. As a sophomore, he moved to defensive end and was a backup, recording five tackles and one sack. In 2006, he once again was a backup, totaling 25 tackles and one sack. In 2007, Ayers was once again a backup, but led the team with four sacks and 12 tackles for losses. He also had 34 tackles, two pass breakups and four quarterback pressures. As a senior in 2008 Ayers became a starter at right defensive end, recording 49 tackles, three sacks, one interception, and a team and league leading 15.5 tackles for losses.

== Professional career ==
Pre-draft measurables
Height	Weight	40-yard dash	10-yard split	20-yard split	20-yard shuttle	Three-cone drill	Vertical jump	Broad jump	Bench press	Wonderlic
6 ft 3 1/8 in (1.91 m)	272 lb (123 kg)	4.78 s	1.62 s	2.78 s	4.46 s	7.07 s	29 1/2 in (0.75 m)	8 ft 6 in (2.59 m)	18 reps	29
20-ss and 3-cone from Tennessee Pro Day, all others from NFL Combine

=== Denver Broncos ===
Ayers was selected by the Denver Broncos as the second one of their two first round picks at 18th overall of the 2009 NFL draft. The Broncos drafted Ayers with the first round pick that was traded from the Chicago Bears in exchange for Jay Cutler. On August 4, 2009, Ayers signed a five-year contract with $9.7 million guaranteed. In his rookie season, he recorded 19 tackles and no sacks. He recorded his first professional sack in week 1 of the 2010 season against David Garrard of the Jacksonville Jaguars.

Ayers's second season was a bit of a disappointment to fans who were hoping for high production from the former first-round draft selection. In 2010, Ayers started in ten games as an outside linebacker and recorded 39 tackles and 1.5 sacks.

Ayers finished the 2011 season with three sacks, 39 total tackles, three passes defended, and one forced fumble. He had two sacks against the Steelers in the Wild Card Round victory.

Ayers began the 2012 season as a backup under new defensive coordinator Jack Del Rio. He had two sacks and 16 total tackles in 15 games.

In the 2013 season, Ayers had 5.5 sacks, 29 total tackles, and one forced fumble in 15 games and three starts. In the AFC Championship, he had one sack in the 26–16 win over the Patriots. The Broncos reached Super Bowl XLVIII, but fell to the Seattle Seahawks, 43–8. Ayers recorded one tackle in the game.

=== New York Giants ===
Ayers signed a two-year, $4 million contract with the New York Giants on April 2, 2014. He was placed on season ending injured reserve on December 2, 2014, after suffering a torn pectoral muscle. In the 2014 season, he had five sacks, one pass defended, and one forced fumble in 12 games and one start. In 2015, Ayers set a career record for sacks and led all Giants players in that category with 9.5 sacks despite missing four games.

=== Tampa Bay Buccaneers ===
On March 12, 2016, Ayers agreed to a three-year, $21 million contract with the Tampa Bay Buccaneers. On September 11, Ayers recorded a sack in his Buccaneers debut, bringing down Matt Ryan in a 31–24 win over the Atlanta Falcons. Ayers was sidelined for five weeks due to an ankle injury. On November 13, he recorded a season-high 1.5 sacks and five tackles, as well as forcing fumble in the end zone, resulting as a safety in a 36–10 blowout win over the Chicago Bears. Ayers wrapped up his first year as a Buccaneer with 6.5 sacks, 29 tackles, and a forced fumble.

On October 22, 2017, Ayers brought down his first sack of the season, dropping Tyrod Taylor in a 27–30 loss to the Buffalo Bills. On November 5, Ayers recorded a strip-sack against the New Orleans Saints. He missed Week 12 & 13 due to a concussion. Ayers played two more games, but missed the rest of the season with a shoulder injury. He finished the season with two sacks, 31 tackles, and two forced fumbles.

On March 17, 2018, Ayers was released by the Buccaneers.

=== Detroit Lions ===
On August 27, 2018, Ayers signed a one-year contract with the Detroit Lions, but was released the next day.

=== Retirement ===
After sitting out the entire 2018 season, Ayers announced his retirement on July 16, 2019.

=== NFL statistics ===
Year	Team	GP	COMB	TOTAL	AST	SACK	FF	FR	FR YDS	INT	IR YDS	AVG IR	LNG	TD	PD
2009	DEN	15	19	14	4	0.0	0	2	54	0	0	0	0	0	2
2010	DEN	11	39	32	7	1.5	1	0	0	0	0	0	0	0	1
2011	DEN	16	39	25	16	3.0	1	1	0	0	0	0	0	0	2
2012	DEN	15	16	8	8	2.0	0	0	0	0	0	0	0	0	2
2013	DEN	15	29	26	7	5.5	1	0	0	0	0	0	0	0	0
2014	NYG	12	22	18	4	5.0	1	0	0	0	0	0	0	0	1
2015	NYG	12	41	31	10	9.0	2	0	0	0	0	0	0	0	4
2016	TB	12	29	21	8	6.5	1	0	0	0	0	0	0	0	1
2017	TB	12	31	20	11	2.0	2	0	0	0	0	0	0	0	0
Career		120	265	195	75	34.5	9	3	54	0	0	0	0	0	13

== Coaching career ==
Ayers joined the University of Tennessee coaching staff as a defensive graduate assistant before the 2023 season.
