= Braxton Kelley =

American football player (born 1986)

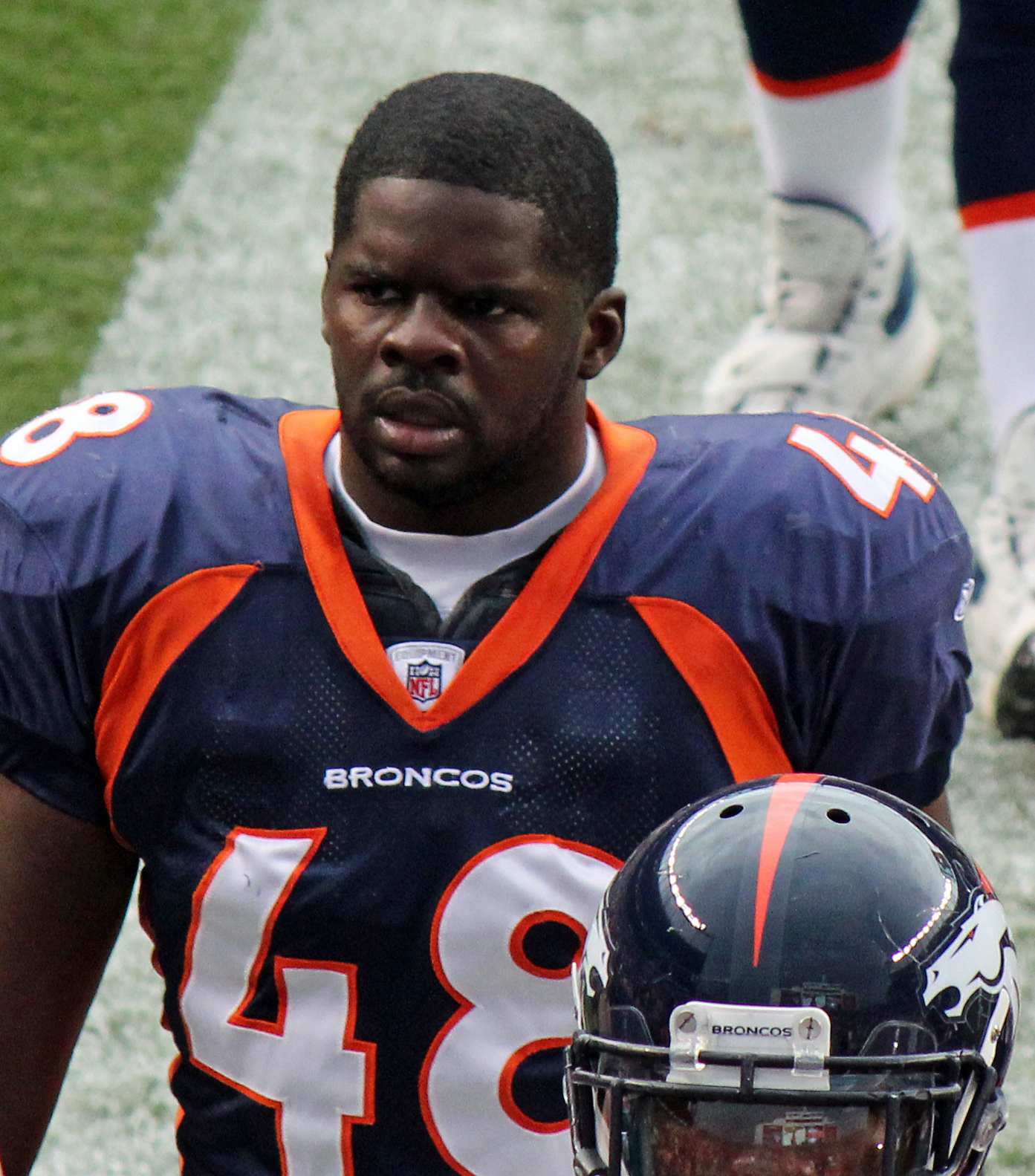
- Kelley in August, 2011.

No. 48
- Position: Linebacker

Personal information
- Born: October 24, 1986 (age 40); LaGrange, Georgia, U.S.
- Listed height: 6 ft 0 in (1.83 m)
- Listed weight: 242 lb (110 kg)

Career information
- College: Kentucky
- NFL draft: 2009: undrafted

Career history
- Denver Broncos (2009–2011)

Awards and highlights
- Freshman All-American (2005); Second-team All-SEC (2008); SEC All-Freshman team (2005)
- Stats at Pro Football Reference

Braxton Kelley (born October 24, 1986) is an American former football linebacker. He was signed by the Denver Broncos as an undrafted free agent in 2009. He played college football at Kentucky.
