= 2017 Denver Broncos season =

American football team season

- Owner: The Pat Bowlen Trust
- General manager: John Elway
- Head coach: Vance Joseph
- Home stadium: Sports Authority Field at Mile High

Results
- Record: 5–11
- Division place: 4th AFC West
- Playoffs: Did not qualify
- All-Pros: LB Von Miller (2nd team)
- Pro Bowlers: OLB Von Miller; CB Aqib Talib

Uniform
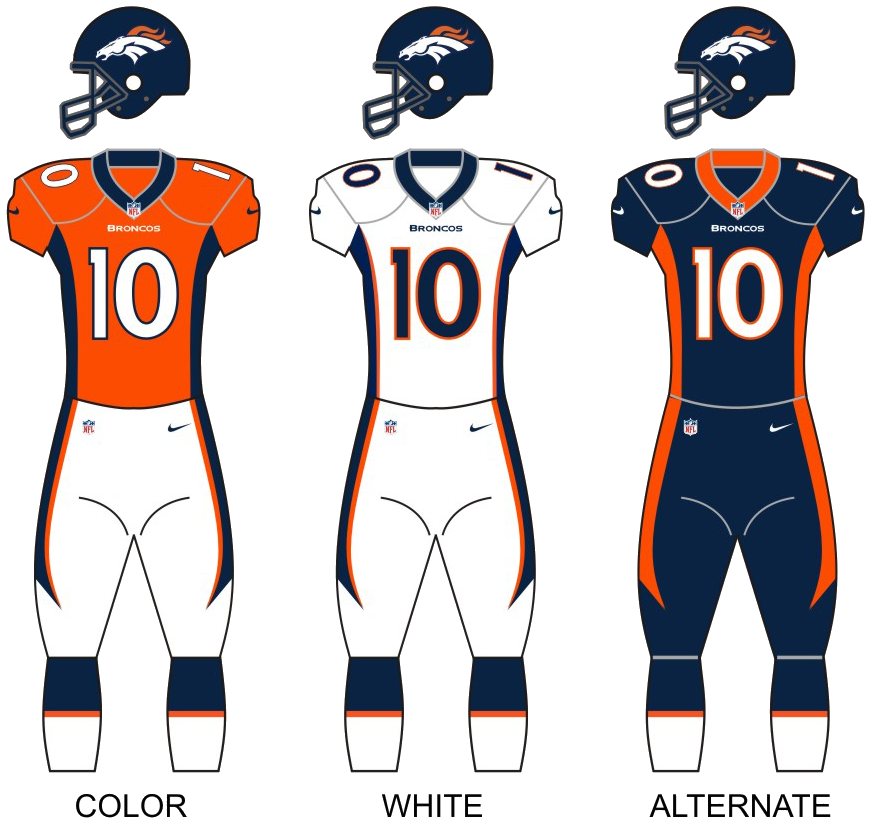

The 2017 season was the Denver Broncos' 48th season in the National Football League (NFL) and the 58th overall.

The Broncos underwent numerous coaching changes during the offseason, after Vance Joseph was hired as the team's new head coach. Joseph replaced Gary Kubiak, the team's head coach during the previous two seasons, who was forced to retire from coaching due to health concerns.

After a 3–1 start, the Broncos suffered through an 8-game losing streak – the team's longest since 1967 where they scored more than 20 points just once. Poor offensive performances, along with a quarterback carousel, contributed to the losing skid. In terms of statistics, the Broncos' defense ranked in the top five in total yards, rushing yards and passing yards, but had the league's second-worst turnover differential (ahead of only the winless Cleveland Browns), surrendered the third-most sacks and ranked 27th in points per game despite having ranked 17th on total offense. The Broncos also failed to score 20 or more points in 10 of their 16 games, and for a second consecutive season, scored 30 or more only once.

The Broncos missed the playoffs for a second consecutive season, clinched a losing record for the first time since 2010 and suffered only their fourth losing season since John Elway's retirement after the 1998 season.

== Coaching changes ==
=== Departures ===
On January 2, 2017, one day after the 2016 regular season finale, head coach Gary Kubiak announced his retirement from coaching due to health concerns. Kubiak suffered a mini-stroke in 2013 while coaching the Houston Texans, as well as a migraine condition that forced him to miss one game during the 2016 season. In his two seasons as the Broncos' head coach, Kubiak led the team to a 24–11 record (including the playoffs) – the most victories of any coach in the first two seasons with the team, as well as guiding the Broncos to a victory in Super Bowl 50.

Following the hiring of Vance Joseph as the team's new head coach (see below), the Broncos underwent the following departures from their coaching staff:

- January 13: The team mutually parted ways with offensive line coach Clancy Barone, tight ends coach Brian Pariani, assistant defensive backs coach Samson Brown, assistant special teams coach Tony Coaxum and offensive line assistant James Cregg, and fired offensive coordinator Rick Dennison and quarterbacks coach Greg Knapp. Defensive coordinator Wade Phillips was hired to the same position with the Los Angeles Rams.
- January 14: Special teams coach Joe DeCamillis was hired to the same position with the Jacksonville Jaguars.
- February 2: Marc Lubick, the team's assistant wide receiver's coach since 2015, departed to become an offensive quality control/assistant quarterbacks coach with the Buffalo Bills.

=== Promotions ===
- January 15: Joe Woods was promoted from the defensive backs coach position that he held from 2015 to 2016 to defensive coordinator.
- January 24: Chris Gould was promoted from the special teams quality control coach position that he held from 2015 to 2016 to assistant special teams coach.
- January 30: Eric Studesville was promoted to assistant head coach, and would continue to retain the running backs coach position that he has held since 2010, a season in which Studesville also served as the team's interim head coach.

=== Additions ===
On January 11, Vance Joseph was hired as the Broncos' new head coach. Joseph, a University of Colorado alum, served as a defensive backs coach with the San Francisco 49ers from 2005 to 2010, in the same capacity on Gary Kubiak's staff with the Houston Texans from 2011 to 2013 and with the Cincinnati Bengals from 2014 to 2015. The Broncos previously recruited Joseph for the team's defensive coordinator position in 2015, but were denied permission by the Bengals. Joseph was the Miami Dolphins' defensive coordinator in 2016.

Following the hiring of Vance Joseph, the Broncos made the following additions to their coaching staff:

- January 13: Mike McCoy was hired as the offensive coordinator. This was the second stint for McCoy as the Broncos' offensive coordinator – a position he previously held from 2009 to 2012. McCoy served as the San Diego Chargers' head coach from 2013 to 2016. Bill Musgrave was hired as the quarterbacks coach. Musgrave worked in the same capacity with the Oakland Raiders during the previous two seasons, and was John Elway's backup quarterback from 1995 to 1996.
- January 14: Jeff Davidson was hired as the offensive line coach. Davidson served in the same capacity on Mike McCoy's staff with the San Diego Chargers in 2016, and was a Broncos' offensive lineman from 1990 to 1993.
- January 15: John Benton was hired as an assistant offensive line coach. Benton had previously worked in the same capacity with the Jacksonville Jaguars in 2016 as well as on Gary Kubiak's staff with the Houston Texans from 2006 to 2013. However, on February 20, the Broncos granted Benton permission to interview for the lead offensive line coach position with the San Francisco 49ers, and one day later, Benton was officially hired by the 49ers.
- January 17: Marcus Robertson was hired as the defensive backs coach. Robertson worked in the same capacity with the Oakland Raiders from 2015 to 2016, as well as an assistant under Joe Woods with the Raiders in 2014. Brock Olivo was hired as special teams coordinator. Olivo served as a special teams assistant with the Kansas City Chiefs from 2014 to 2016.
- January 19: Johnnie Lynn was hired as the assistant defensive backs coach. Lynn previously worked alongside Vance Joseph with the 49ers from 2006 to 2010, and most recently with the Raiders from 2012 to 2013.
- January 27: Geep Chryst was hired as tight ends coach. Chryst previously worked in the same capacity with the Carolina Panthers from 2006 to 2010, where he worked alongside former Broncos' offensive coordinator Mike McCoy for three seasons as well as alongside offensive line coach Jeff Davidson for four seasons. Chryst was recently on the San Francisco 49ers' coaching staff, where he served as quarterbacks coach from 2011 to 2014 and offensive coordinator in 2015.
- February 21: Charles Gordon was hired as a defensive quality control coach. Gordon worked in the same capacity at the University of Northern Colorado during the previous four seasons (2013–2016), and was a defensive back for three seasons with the Minnesota Vikings under the tutelage of Joe Woods, the Broncos' current defensive coordinator.
- February 25: Chris Strausser was hired as the team's assistant offensive line coach, replacing John Benton. Strausser spent the previous three seasons as the offensive line coach at the University of Washington.

=== In-season ===
On November 20, one day after the Broncos' Week 11 loss to the Cincinnati Bengals, offensive coordinator Mike McCoy was fired as the result of the team's recurring offensive woes. During the six-game losing streak that resulted in McCoy's firing, the Broncos averaged 14.2 points – second-worst in the NFL, and committed a league-high 17 turnovers. Bill Musgrave was elevated from quarterbacks coach to offensive coordinator, while Klint Kubiak was elevated from an offensive assistant to quarterbacks coach.

== Front office changes ==
- January 31: Adam Peters, the team's director of college scouting in 2016, departed to become the San Francisco 49ers' vice president of player personnel.
- May 4: The Broncos made the following changes to their front office: Brian Stark was hired as the team's new director of college scouting, replacing Adam Peters. Tom Heckert was promoted to senior personnel adviser after serving as the team's director of pro personnel the previous four seasons. A. J. Durso, who was the team's pro scouting coordinator from 2013 to 2014, filled Heckert's old position as director of pro personnel. Patrick Walsh was promoted from personnel assistant to player personnel assistant.
- July 25: Former Broncos' head coach Gary Kubiak, who retired from coaching at the end of the 2016 season (see above), returned to the Broncos' organization as a senior personnel advisor in the team's front office. Kubiak will be based in his hometown of Houston, but will make occasional trips to the Broncos' Dove Valley headquarters.

== Roster changes ==
=== Free agents ===
==== Unrestricted ====
| Position | Player | 2017 Team | Notes |
|---|---|---|---|
| C | Sam Brenner | None | originally an RFA |
| WR | Marlon Brown | None | released September 2 |
| RB | Justin Forsett | None | retired on May 3 |
| LS | Thomas Gafford | None | |
| WR | Jordan Norwood | None | |
| OT | Russell Okung | Los Angeles Chargers | contract option declined, signed with the Chargers on March 9 |
| DE | Vance Walker | None | |
| LB | DeMarcus Ware | None | retired on March 13 |
| LB | Dekoda Watson | San Francisco 49ers | signed with the 49ers on March 17 |
| CB | Kayvon Webster | Los Angeles Rams | signed with the Rams on March 13 |
| NT | Sylvester Williams | Tennessee Titans | signed with the Titans on March 10 |
| DE | Billy Winn | None | re-signed May 2, placed on injured reserve August 12 |

==== Restricted ====
| Position | Player | 2017 Team | Notes |
|---|---|---|---|
| LB | Todd Davis | Denver Broncos | assigned tender on March 8 |
| PK | Brandon McManus | Denver Broncos | assigned tender on March 8, re-signed June 14 |

==== Exclusive-Rights ====
| Position | Player | 2017 Team | Notes |
|---|---|---|---|
| LB | Zaire Anderson | Denver Broncos | assigned tender on March 8 |
| LB | Shaquil Barrett | Denver Broncos | assigned tender on March 8 |
| RB | Kapri Bibbs | Denver Broncos | assigned tender on March 8 |
| C | James Ferentz | Denver Broncos | assigned tender on March 8 |
| WR | Bennie Fowler | Denver Broncos | assigned tender on March 8 |
| LB | Quentin Gause | None | |
| LS | Casey Kreiter | Denver Broncos | assigned tender on March 8, re-signed April 3 |
| TE | Henry Krieger-Coble | None | |
| CB | Taurean Nixon | None | |
| C | Matt Paradis | Denver Broncos | assigned tender on March 8, re-signed April 3 |
| NT | Kyle Peko | Denver Broncos | waived September 2, re-signed September 3, waived September 9, assigned to the practice squad on September 11, re-signed September 18, waived October 21, assigned to the practice squad on October 24, promoted to the active roster on November 25 |
| WR | Jordan Taylor | Denver Broncos | assigned tender on March 8, re-signed April 3 |

=== Signings ===
| Position | Player | 2016 Team | Notes |
|---|---|---|---|
| DE | Jimmy Bean | None | claimed off waivers on August 25, waived August 29 |
| RB | Jamaal Charles | Kansas City Chiefs | signed May 2 |
| C | Dillon Day | Practice squad | signed October 21, waived October 24, assigned to the practice squad on November 8 |
| G | J. J. Dielman | Cincinnati Bengals | signed December 16 |
| LB | Kasim Edebali | New Orleans Saints | signed March 13, waived November 15 |
| CB | Michael Hunter | Practice squad | signed December 20 |
| OT | Cyrus Kouandjio | Buffalo Bills | signed November 8 |
| CB | Chris Lewis-Harris | Cincinnati Bengals; Baltimore Ravens | signed June 14, released September 2 |
| LB | Joseph Jones | Seattle Seahawks | signed November 7 |
| NT | Zach Kerr | Indianapolis Colts | signed March 11 |
| G | Ronald Leary | Dallas Cowboys | signed March 9 |
| LB | Danny Mason | Chicago Bears | signed July 29, waived September 2 |
| LB | Deiontrez Mount | None | signed August 29, waived September 2, assigned to the practice squad on September 3, promoted to the active roster on November 15 |
| NT | Domata Peko | Cincinnati Bengals | signed March 11 |
| QB | Brock Osweiler | Houston Texans | signed September 2 |
| DE | Bobby Richardson | Kansas City Chiefs | signed February 24, waived May 2 |
| RB | Stevan Ridley | Atlanta Falcons | signed July 27, released September 2 |
| DT | Ahtyba Rubin | Seattle Seahawks | signed September 15, released October 17 |
| WR | Hunter Sharp | Philadelphia Eagles | promoted from the practice squad on October 18, waived October 28 |
| LB | Kevin Snyder | Practice squad | signed October 28, waived November 7 |
| TE | Austin Traylor | Practice squad | promoted from the practice squad on November 18 |
| OT | Menelik Watson | Oakland Raiders | signed March 10, placed on injured reserve November 8 |

| Indicates that the player was a free agent at the end of his respective team's 2016 season. |

=== Departures ===
| Position | Player | Notes |
|---|---|---|
| TE | A. J. Derby | designated as waived/injured on November 18 |
| LB | Vontarrius Dora | waived September 2 |
| CB | Lorenzo Doss | waived November 23 |
| C | James Ferentz | waived May 10 |
| LB | Quentin Gause | waived September 2 |
| TE | Henry Krieger-Coble | waived July 29 |
| CB | Taurean Nixon | waived June 14 |
| WR | Kalif Raymond | waived September 2 |
| RB | Juwan Thompson | waived September 2 |
| S | T. J. Ward | released September 2 |
| G | Michael Schofield | waived September 2 |

=== Trades ===
- July 26: The Broncos acquired guard Allen Barbre in a trade that sent a 2019 seventh-round draft selection to the Philadelphia Eagles.
- September 1: Offensive tackle Ty Sambrailo was traded to the Atlanta Falcons in exchange for the Falcons' 2018 fifth-round selection.

=== Draft ===
2017 Denver Broncos Draft
| Round | Selection | Player | Position | College | Notes |
|---|---|---|---|---|---|
| 1 | 20 | Garett Bolles | OT | Utah | signed May 11 |
| 2 | 51 | DeMarcus Walker | DE | Florida State | signed May 13 |
| 3 | 82 | Carlos Henderson | WR | Louisiana Tech | signed May 26, placed on injured reserve September 2 |
| 3 | 101 | Brendan Langley | CB | Lamar | signed May 11 |
| 4 | None – see table below | | | | |
| 5 | 145 | Jake Butt | TE | Michigan | signed May 11, placed on the non-football injury list September 2, placed on injured reserve November 6 |
| 5 | 172 | Isaiah McKenzie | WR | Georgia | signed May 8 |
| 6 | 203 | De'Angelo Henderson | RB | Coastal Carolina | signed May 10 |
| 7 | 253 | Chad Kelly | QB | Ole Miss | signed May 10, placed on the non-football injury list September 2, placed on injured reserve November 6 |

Note: Prior to the draft, the Broncos received four compensatory selections – one in the third round (No. 101), one in the fifth round (No. 177) and two in the seventh round (Nos. 252 and 253). This was the first time in NFL draft history in which teams were allowed to trade compensatory selections, and the Broncos later traded the No. 177 and No. 252 selections – see table below.

==== Draft trades ====
| Trade partner | Broncos give | Broncos receive | Source |
|---|---|---|---|
| Cleveland Browns | 2017 fourth-round selection (No. 126); 2017 seventh-round selection (No. 252 – compensatory) | 2017 fifth-round selection (No. 145); 2017 fifth-round selection (No. 175 – later traded to the Packers) | |
| Green Bay Packers | 2017 fifth-round selection (No. 175); 2017 sixth-round selection (No. 238) | 2017 fifth-round selection (No. 172) | |
| San Francisco 49ers | 2017 fifth-round selection (No. 177 – compensatory); Running back Kapri Bibbs | 2018 fourth-round selection | |
| San Francisco 49ers | Original 2017 sixth-round selection (No. 202); 2016 sixth-round selection | 2016 seventh-round selection Tight end Vernon Davis | |
| New England Patriots | Original 2017 fifth-round selection (No. 163) | Tight end A. J. Derby | |
| Tennessee Titans | 2016 fifth- and seventh-round selections | 2017 sixth-round selection (No. 203) | |

=== Undrafted free agents ===
All undrafted free agents were signed after the 2017 NFL draft concluded on April 29, unless noted otherwise.

2017 Denver Broncos undrafted free agents
| Player | Position | College | Notes |
|---|---|---|---|
| DE | Nelson Adams | Mississippi State | originally signed and waived by the Pittsburgh Steelers, claimed off waivers on August 12, waived September 2 |
| G | Erik Austell | Charleston Southern | waived June 6 |
| LB | Josh Banderas | Nebraska | designated as waived/injured on July 24 |
| S | Dante Barnett | Kansas State | waived September 2 |
| S | Jamal Carter | Miami (FL) | the only undrafted rookie to make the Week 1 roster, on final roster |
| DE | Ken Ekanem | Virginia Tech | waived September 2 |
| LB | Jerrol Garcia-Williams | Hawaii | waived September 2, assigned to the practice squad on September 3, promoted to the active roster on October 21, on final roster |
| LB | Deon Hollins | UCLA | waived September 2 |
| G | Cameron Hunt | Oregon | waived September 2 |
| NT | Tyrique Jarrett | Pittsburgh | waived September 2, assigned to the practice squad on September 3, promoted to the active roster on September 11, assigned to the practice squad on September 18 |
| G | Chris Muller | Rutgers | originally signed and waived by the Indianapolis Colts, claimed off waivers on June 6, waived July 27 |
| WR | Anthony Nash | Duke | waived September 2 |
| CB | Dontrell Nelson | Memphis | waived August 25 |
| CB | Marcus Rios | UCLA | waived September 2, assigned to the practice squad on September 3, promoted to the active roster on December 1, on final roster |
| QB | Kyle Sloter | Northern Colorado | waived September 2 |
| DE | Shakir Soto | Pittsburgh | waived September 2 |
| S | Orion Stewart | Baylor | waived September 2 |
| S | Dymonte Thomas | Michigan | waived September 2, assigned to the practice squad on September 3, promoted to the active roster on December 14, on final roster |
| OT | Elijah Wilkinson | UMass | waived September 2, assigned to the practice squad on September 3, promoted to the active roster on October 21, on final roster |
| RB | Stanley Williams | Kentucky | originally signed and waived by the Cincinnati Bengals, claimed off waivers on August 21, waived September 2 |

=== Injuries ===
- July 28: Linebacker Shane Ray suffered a torn ligament in his left wrist at the beginning of training camp, and missed the entire preseason. On September 3, one day after the Broncos cut the roster to a league-mandated 53 players, Ray was placed on injured reserve, and missed the first seven weeks of the regular season, before being activated prior to the team's Week 8 loss to the Kansas City Chiefs. Ray re-aggravated the injury later in the season, and was placed on injured reserve on December 19.
- August 10: Wide receiver Carlos Henderson, the team's third-round draft selection, suffered a thumb injury during the Broncos' first preseason game vs. the Chicago Bears. He was placed on injured reserve on September 2. Also on August 10, defensive end Billy Winn suffered a torn ACL in his right knee during the Broncos' first preseason game vs. the Chicago Bears, and was ruled out for the season after being placed on injured reserve.
- September 2: Tight end Jake Butt and quarterback Chad Kelly, the team's fifth- and seventh-round draft selections, respectively, were placed on the non-football injury list due to knee injuries that both players sustained prior to being drafted by the Broncos. Butt began practicing on October 18, and the Broncos had a 21-day window to either add him to the active roster or place him on the season-ending injured reserve. However, Butt and Kelly were both placed on the season-ending injured reserve on November 6, ending their rookie seasons.
- September 15: Defensive end Jared Crick was placed on injured reserve due to a back injury that will require surgery. He missed the Broncos' Week 1 win over the Los Angeles Chargers.
- October 17: Guard Billy Turner was placed on injured reserve, after suffering a fractured hand during the team's Week 6 loss to the New York Giants.
- October 15: Wide receivers Emmanuel Sanders and Isaiah McKenzie each suffered ankle sprains during the Broncos' Week 6 loss to the New York Giants, and missed the team's Week 7 loss to the Los Angeles Chargers. Sanders also missed the team's Week 8 loss to the Kansas City Chiefs.
- November 8: Offensive tackle Menelik Watson ruptured a tendon in his foot during the team's Week 9 loss to the Philadelphia Eagles, and was placed on injured reserve.
- Defensive end Derek Wolfe suffered a neck injury during the team's Week 12 loss to the Oakland Raiders, and missed the Broncos' following game at the Miami Dolphins. On December 5, Wolfe was placed on the season-ending injured reserve.
- Quarterback Paxton Lynch was inactive for the first half of the season due to a sprained shoulder that he suffered during the preseason. After being named the starting quarterback in Week 12, Lynch suffered an ankle injury during the team's Week 12 loss to the Oakland Raiders that will sideline him for two to four weeks.
- December 13: Safety Justin Simmons was placed on injured reserve, after suffering a high-ankle sprain during the Broncos' Week 14 win over the New York Jets.

=== Suspensions ===
During the Broncos' Week 12 loss to the Oakland Raiders, cornerback Aqib Talib and Raiders' wide receiver Michael Crabtree engaged in an ugly brawl that initially resulted in both players being suspended for two games, but were reduced to one game following an appeal. The two players had a history of bad blood with one another, following an incident during the teams' 2016 regular-season finale in which Talib yanked a gold chain from Crabtree's neck, with Talib repeating the same actions that led to the brawl with Crabtree.

== Staff ==
2017 Denver Broncos staff
| Front office: Owner – The Pat Bowlen Trust; President/chairman/CEO – Joe Ellis; President of football operations/general manager – John Elway; Director of football administration – Mike Sullivan; Director of player personnel – Matt Russell; Senior personnel advisor – Tom Heckert Jr.; Senior personnel advisor – Gary Kubiak; Director of pro personnel – A.J. Durso; Director of college scouting – Brian Stark; Director of football analytics – Mitch Tanney; Head coaches: Head coach – Vance Joseph; Assistant head coach/running backs – Eric Studesville; Assistant to head coach – Phil Rauscher; Offensive coaches: Offensive coordinator – Mike McCoy (fired November 20, 2017); Quarterbacks – Bill Musgrave (interim Offensive Coordinator); Wide receivers – Tyke Tolbert; Tight ends – Geep Chryst; Offensive line – Jeff Davidson; Assistant offensive line – Chris Strausser; Offensive assistant/quarterbacks – Klint Kubiak; Offensive quality control – Christopher Kragthorpe | Defensive coaches: Defensive coordinator – Joe Woods; Defensive line – Bill Kollar; Linebackers – Reggie Herring; Outside linebackers – Fred Pagac; Defensive backs – Marcus Robertson; Assistant defensive backs – Johnnie Lynn; Defensive assistant/defensive line – Chris Beake; Defensive quality control – Charles Gordon; Special teams coaches: Special teams coordinator – Brock Olivo; Assistant special teams – Chris Gould; Strength and conditioning: Strength and conditioning – Luke Richesson; Assistant strength and conditioning – Mike Eubanks; Assistant strength and conditioning – Anthony Lomando; Assistant strength and conditioning – Cedric Smith |

== Final roster ==
2017 Denver Broncos roster
| Quarterbacks (QB): 13 Trevor Siemian; 12 Paxton Lynch; 17 Brock Osweiler; Running backs (RB): 22 C. J. Anderson; 23 Devontae Booker; 28 Jamaal Charles; 33 De'Angelo Henderson; 32 Andy Janovich FB; Wide receivers (WR): 16 Bennie Fowler; 14 Cody Latimer; 84 Isaiah McKenzie; 10 Emmanuel Sanders; 87 Jordan Taylor; 88 Demaryius Thomas; Tight ends (TE): 85 Virgil Green; 82 Jeff Heuerman; 83 Matt LaCosse; 86 Austin Traylor | Offensive linemen (OL): 73 Allen Barbre T/G; 72 Garett Bolles T; 64 J. J. Dielman G; 76 Max Garcia G; 79 Cyrus Kouandjio T; 60 Connor McGovern G/C; 61 Matt Paradis C; 71 Donald Stephenson T; 68 Elijah Wilkinson T; Defensive linemen (DL): 99 Adam Gotsis DE; 96 Shelby Harris DE; 92 Zach Kerr NT; 94 Domata Peko NT; 90 Kyle Peko NT; 57 DeMarcus Walker DE | Linebackers (LB): 50 Zaire Anderson ILB; 48 Shaquil Barrett OLB; 51 Todd Davis ILB; 41 Jerrol Garcia-Williams ILB; 43 Joseph Jones ILB; 54 Brandon Marshall ILB; 58 Von Miller OLB; 53 Deiontrez Mount OLB; Defensive backs (DB): 20 Jamal Carter FS; 25 Chris Harris Jr. CB; 39 Michael Hunter CB; 27 Brendan Langley CB; 34 Will Parks SS; 38 Marcus Rios CB; 29 Bradley Roby CB; 26 Darian Stewart FS; 21 Aqib Talib CB; 35 Dymonte Thomas SS; Special teams (ST): 9 Riley Dixon P; 42 Casey Kreiter LS; 8 Brandon McManus K | Practice squad: 91 Paul Boyette DE; 15 River Cracraft WR; 19 Jordan Leslie WR; 59 Stansly Maponga OLB; 30 Jordan Moore SS; 89 Brian Parker TE; 81 Tim Patrick WR; 74 Jeremiah Poutasi G; 49 Marcus Rush OLB; 69 Jhaustin Thomas DE; Reserve: 80 Jake Butt TE (IR); 93 Jared Crick DE (IR); 11 Carlos Henderson WR (IR); 6 Chad Kelly QB (NF-Inj.); 65 Ronald Leary G (IR); 52 Corey Nelson ILB (IR); 56 Shane Ray OLB (IR); 13 Trevor Siemian QB (IR); 31 Justin Simmons SS (IR); 77 Billy Turner G (IR); 75 Menelik Watson T (IR); 97 Billy Winn DE (IR); 95 Derek Wolfe DE (IR); Rookies in italics 53 active, 13 reserve, 10 practice squad |

== Preseason ==
| Week | Date | Opponent | Result | Record | Venue | Recap |
|---|---|---|---|---|---|---|
| 1 | August 10 | at Chicago Bears | W 24–17 | 1–0 | Soldier Field | Recap |
| 2 | August 19 | at San Francisco 49ers | W 33–14 | 2–0 | Levi's Stadium | Recap |
| 3 | August 26 | Green Bay Packers | W 20–17 | 3–0 | Sports Authority Field at Mile High | Recap |
| 4 | August 31 | Arizona Cardinals | W 30–2 | 4–0 | Sports Authority Field at Mile High | Recap |

== Regular season ==
=== Schedule ===
The Broncos' 2017 schedule was announced on April 20.

| Week | Date | Opponent | Result | Record | Venue | Recap |
|---|---|---|---|---|---|---|
| 1 | September 11 | **Los Angeles Chargers** | **W** 24–21 | 1–0 | Sports Authority Field at Mile High | Recap |
| 2 | September 17 | Dallas Cowboys | **W** 42–17 | 2–0 | Sports Authority Field at Mile High | Recap |
| 3 | September 24 | at Buffalo Bills | **L** 16–26 | 2–1 | New Era Field | Recap |
| 4 | October 1 | **Oakland Raiders** | **W** 16–10 | 3–1 | Sports Authority Field at Mile High | Recap |
| 5 | Bye | | | | | |
| 6 | October 15 | New York Giants | **L** 10–23 | 3–2 | Sports Authority Field at Mile High | Recap |
| 7 | October 22 | at **Los Angeles Chargers** | **L** 0–21 | 3–3 | StubHub Center | Recap |
| 8 | October 30 | at **Kansas City Chiefs** | **L** 19–29 | 3–4 | Arrowhead Stadium | Recap |
| 9 | November 5 | at Philadelphia Eagles | **L** 23–51 | 3–5 | Lincoln Financial Field | Recap |
| 10 | November 12 | New England Patriots | **L** 16–41 | 3–6 | Sports Authority Field at Mile High | Recap |
| 11 | November 19 | Cincinnati Bengals | **L** 17–20 | 3–7 | Sports Authority Field at Mile High | Recap |
| 12 | November 26 | at **Oakland Raiders** | **L** 14–21 | 3–8 | Oakland–Alameda County Coliseum | Recap |
| 13 | December 3 | at Miami Dolphins | **L** 9–35 | 3–9 | Hard Rock Stadium | Recap |
| 14 | December 10 | New York Jets | **W** 23–0 | 4–9 | Sports Authority Field at Mile High | Recap |
| 15 | December 14 | at Indianapolis Colts | **W** 25–13 | 5–9 | Lucas Oil Stadium | Recap |
| 16 | December 24 | at Washington Redskins | **L** 11–27 | 5–10 | FedExField | Recap |
| 17 | December 31 | **Kansas City Chiefs** | **L** 24–27 | 5–11 | Sports Authority Field at Mile High | Recap |

Note: Intra-division opponents are in bold text.

=== Game summaries ===
==== Week 1: vs. Los Angeles Chargers ====
Week One: Los Angeles Chargers at Denver Broncos – Game summary

| Quarter | 1 | 2 | 3 | 4 | Total |
|---|---|---|---|---|---|
| Chargers | 0 | 7 | 0 | 14 | **21** |
| **Broncos** | 7 | 7 | 10 | 0 | **24** |

at Sports Authority Field at Mile High, Denver, Colorado

- Date: September 11
- Game time: 8:20 p.m. MDT
- Game weather: 73 °F (23 °C), mostly cloudy
- Game attendance: 76,324
- Referee: Terry McAulay
- TV announcers (ESPN): Beth Mowins, Rex Ryan and Sergio Dipp
- Recap, Gamebook

Game information

**First quarter**

- DEN – Bennie Fowler III 5-yard pass from Trevor Siemian (Brandon McManus kick), 4:58. Broncos 7–0. **Drive: 13 plays, 70 yards, 6:05.**

**Second quarter**

- LAC – Melvin Gordon 11-yard pass from Philip Rivers (Younghoe Koo kick), 15:00. Tied 7–7. **Drive: 10 plays, 75 yards, 4:55.**
- DEN – Trevor Siemian 1-yard run (Brandon McManus kick), 5:33. Broncos 14–7. **Drive: 9 plays, 56 yards, 4:38.**

**Third quarter**

- DEN – Bennie Fowler 6-yard pass from Trevor Siemian (Brandon McManus kick), 10:31. Broncos 21–7. **Drive: 6 plays, 43 yards, 3:00.**
- DEN – Brandon McManus 20-yard field goal, 0:03. Broncos 24–7. **Drive: 14 plays, 78 yards, 8:16.**

**Fourth quarter**

- LAC – Keenan Allen 5-yard pass from Philip Rivers (Younghoe Koo kick), 8:15. Broncos 24–14. **Drive: 6 plays, 43 yards, 2:27.**
- LAC – Travis Benjamin 38-yard pass from Philip Rivers (Younghoe Koo kick), 7:07. Broncos 24–21. **Drive: 1 play, 38 yards, 0:07.**

**Top passers**

- LAC – Philip Rivers – 22/33, 192 yards, 3 TD, INT
- DEN – Trevor Siemian – 17/28, 219 yards, 2 TD, INT

**Top rushers**

- LAC – Melvin Gordon – 18 rushes, 54 yards
- DEN – C. J. Anderson – 20 rushes, 81 yards

**Top receivers**

- LAC – Tyrell Williams – 5 receptions, 54 yards
- DEN – Demaryius Thomas – 5 receptions, 67 yards

For a seventh consecutive year, the Broncos kicked off the season at home, in the second half of the opening Monday night doubleheader against the Los Angeles Chargers. After an exchange of punts, a 5-yard touchdown pass from quarterback Trevor Siemian to wide receiver Bennie Fowler III game the Broncos the early lead. The drive was kept alive as the result of a near-interception by Chargers' cornerback Casey Hayward. On the first play of the second quarter, the Chargers countered, with quarterback Philip Rivers connecting on an 11-yard touchdown pass to running back Melvin Gordon, with Ingram leaping above Broncos' safety Justin Simmons in order to reach the goal line. The Broncos re-claimed the lead later in the second quarter, with Siemian rushing for a 1-yard touchdown, then added to their lead on their initial possession of the second half, with another touchdown pass from Siemian to Fowler – from 6 yards out. The Broncos reached the Chargers' 3-yard line on a 14-play, 78-yard drive that chewed up the last 8:16 of the third quarter, but had to settle on a 20-yard field goal by placekicker Brandon McManus to increase their lead to 24–7.

After stopping the Chargers on a 4th-and-1 near midfield, the Broncos' offense committed two turnovers – an interception of Siemian by Chargers' safety Adrian Phillips and a fumble by running back Jamaal Charles. The Chargers took advantage of both turnovers and narrowed the Broncos' lead to 24–21, with a pair of touchdown passes by Rivers – a 5-yarder to wide receiver Keenan Allen followed by a 38-yarder to wide receiver Travis Benjamin – the latter occurring with seven minutes remaining in the game. Following an exchange of punts, the Chargers had one last possession at the two-minute warning and were forced to use their last timeout with 42 seconds remaining. Six plays later, the Chargers were attempting a game-tying field goal to send the game to overtime. Placekicker Younghoe Koo's initial field goal was good; however, it was nullified as the result of Broncos' head coach Vance Joseph calling a timeout in order to ice the kicker. Koo's second attempt was blocked by defensive end Shelby Harris, sealing the win for the Broncos.

Notes

Vance Joseph and Chargers' head coach Anthony Lynn became the first two head coaches of African American descent to make their coaching debuts in the same game. Beth Mowins, who handled the play-by-play duties for ESPN, became the first woman to call an NFL game since 1987.

==== Week 2: vs. Dallas Cowboys ====
Week Two: Dallas Cowboys at Denver Broncos – Game summary

| Quarter | 1 | 2 | 3 | 4 | Total |
|---|---|---|---|---|---|
| Cowboys | 0 | 10 | 0 | 7 | **17** |
| **Broncos** | 7 | 14 | 14 | 7 | **42** |

at Sports Authority Field at Mile High, Denver, Colorado

- Date: September 17
- Game time: 2:25 p.m. MDT
- Game weather: 72 °F (22 °C), partly cloudy
- Game attendance: 76,919
- Referee: Brad Allen
- TV announcers (Fox): Joe Buck, Troy Aikman and Erin Andrews
- Recap, Gamebook

Game information

**First quarter**

- DEN – Emmanuel Sanders 10-yard pass from Trevor Siemian (Brandon McManus kick), 9:25. Broncos 7–0. **Drive: 8 plays, 78 yards, 3:45.**

**Second quarter**

- DAL – Dez Bryant 3-yard pass from Dak Prescott (Dan Bailey kick), 12:39. Tied 7–7. **Drive: 2 plays, 3 yards, 0:46.**
- DEN – C. J. Anderson 16-yard pass from Trevor Siemian (Brandon McManus kick), 5:54. Broncos 14–7. **Drive: 14 plays, 81 yards, 6:45.**
- DEN – Emmanuel Sanders 6-yard pass from Trevor Siemian (Brandon McManus kick), 1:38. Broncos 21–7. **Drive: 8 plays, 51 yards, 2:42.**
- DAL – Dan Bailey 56-yard field goal, 0:02. Broncos 21–10. **Drive: 8 plays, 37 yards, 1:36.**

**Third quarter**

- DEN – Virgil Green 2-yard pass from Trevor Siemian (Brandon McManus kick), 7:56. Broncos 28–10. **Drive: 15 plays, 75 yards, 7:04.**
- DEN – C. J. Anderson 23-yard run (Brandon McManus kick), 6:14. Broncos 35–10. **Drive: 2 plays, 23 yards, 0:14.**

**Fourth quarter**

- DAL – Jason Witten 28-yard pass from Dak Prescott (Dan Bailey kick), 14:24. Broncos 35–17. **Drive: 6 plays, 39 yards, 2:35.**
- DEN – Aqib Talib 103-yard interception return (Brandon McManus kick), 0:53. Broncos 42–17.

**Top passers**

- DAL – Dak Prescott – 30/50, 238 yards, 2 TD, 2 INT
- DEN – Trevor Siemian – 22/32, 231 yards, 4 TD, INT

**Top rushers**

- DAL – Dak Prescott – 3 rushes, 24 yards
- DEN – C. J. Anderson – 25 rushes, 118 yards, TD

**Top receivers**

- DAL – Jason Witten – 10 receptions, 97 yards, TD
- DEN – Demaryius Thomas – 6 receptions, 71 yards

Quarterback Trevor Siemian threw four touchdown passes – two to wide receiver Emmanuel Sanders, and running back C. J. Anderson scored two touchdowns – one rushing and one receiving, in a dominating win over the Cowboys. This was the only game during the 2017 season in which the Broncos scored 30 or more points. The Broncos' defense limited running back Ezekiel Elliott, the league's leading rusher from the 2016 season, to just eight yards on nine carries, while cornerback Aqib Talib returned an interception off Cowboys' quarterback Dak Prescott 103 yards for a touchdown. Near the end of the first quarter, the game was delayed by one hour due to lightning in the Denver area. With the win, the Broncos extended their winning streak against the Cowboys to six games, dating back to 1998.

==== Week 3: at Buffalo Bills ====
Week Three: Denver Broncos at Buffalo Bills – Game summary

| Quarter | 1 | 2 | 3 | 4 | Total |
|---|---|---|---|---|---|
| Broncos | 3 | 10 | 3 | 0 | **16** |
| **Bills** | 0 | 13 | 7 | 6 | **26** |

at New Era Field, Orchard Park, New York

- Date: September 24
- Game time: 1:00 p.m. EDT/11:00 am. MDT
- Game weather: 83 °F (28 °C), sunny
- Game attendance: 68,865
- Referee: Carl Cheffers
- TV announcers (CBS): Spero Dedes and Adam Archuleta
- Recap, Gamebook

Game information

**First quarter**

- DEN – Brandon McManus 38-yard field goal, 0:49. Broncos 3–0. **Drive: 12 plays, 53 yards, 5:03.**

**Second quarter**

- BUF – Andre Holmes 2-yard pass from Tyrod Taylor (Steven Hauschka kick), 11:41. Bills 7–3. **Drive: 10 plays, 74 yards, 4:08.**
- DEN – Jamaal Charles 12-yard run (Brandon McManus kick), 10:26. Broncos 10–7. **Drive: 3 plays, 79 yards, 1:15.**
- BUF – Steven Hauschka 49-yard field goal, 2:51. tied 10–10. **Drive: 5 plays, 1 yard, 1:55.**
- DEN – Brandon McManus 35-yard field goal, 0:42. Broncos 13–10. **Drive: 9 plays, 58 yards, 2:09.**
- BUF – Steven Hauschka 55-yard field goal, 0:01. tied 13–13. **Drive: 5 plays, 38 yards, 0:41.**

**Third quarter**

- DEN – Brandon McManus 28-yard field goal, 7:47. Broncos 16–13. **Drive: 10 plays, 49 yards, 4:58.**
- BUF – Charles Clay 6-yard pass from Tyrod Taylor (Steven Hauschka kick), 6:20. Bills 20–16. **Drive: 4 plays, 69 yards, 1:27.**

**Fourth quarter**

- BUF – Steven Hauschka 53-yard field goal, 13:52. Bills 23–16. **Drive: 4 plays, –3 yards, 1:37.**
- BUF – Steven Hauschka 27-yard field goal, 3:14. Bills 26–16. **Drive: 16 plays, 53 yards, 7:30.**

**Top passers**

- DEN – Trevor Siemian – 24/40, 259 yards, 2 INT
- BUF – Tyrod Taylor – 20/26, 213 yards, 2 TD

**Top rushers**

- DEN – Jamaal Charles – 9 rushes, 56 yards, TD
- BUF – Mike Tolbert – 11 rushes, 41 yards

**Top receivers**

- DEN – Demaryius Thomas - 6 receptions, 98 yards
- BUF – Jordan Matthews – 3 receptions, 61 yards

In their first road game of the season, the Broncos traveled to Orchard Park, New York to face the Buffalo Bills. After a 38-yard field goal by Broncos' placekicker Brandon McManus gave the Broncos the lead late in the first quarter, the Bills grabbed the lead, with a 2-yard touchdown from quarterback Tyrod Taylor to wide receiver Andre Holmes on a deflected pass. The Broncos responded, when running back Jamaal Charles eluded Bills' defenders for a 12-yard touchdown – Charles' first touchdown as a Bronco. The Broncos were attempting to add to their lead on their next possession, however, a 44-yard pass completion from quarterback Trevor Siemian to wide receiver Emmanuel Sanders was overturned by a Bills' challenge, as replay indicated that Sanders did not maintain full control of the football at the Bills' 44-yard line as cornerback Tre'Davious White knocked the ball out. McManus and Bills' placekicker Steven Hauschka proceeded to alternate field goals, with a 28-yarder by McManus giving the Broncos a 16–13 lead midway through the third quarter.

However, the Broncos were held scoreless for the remainder of the game, and the Bills took the lead for good, with Taylor connecting with tight end Charles Clay on a 6-yard touchdown pass. A 53-yard field goal by Hauschka extended the Bills' lead to 23–16 early in the fourth quarter. The Broncos drove to as far as the Bills' 24-yard line on their first possession of the fourth quarter, however, Siemian was intercepted by White. Five plays later, the Broncos' defense forced an incomplete pass off Taylor at the Broncos' 46-yard line, hoping to receive the football back after a punt. However, linebacker Von Miller was flagged for an unsportsmanlike conduct penalty in which he offered to help Taylor off the turf, then pulled his hand back. After the Bills earned three first downs and forced the Broncos to use all of their team timeouts, Hauschka added a 27-yard field goal with 3:18 remaining in the game. The Broncos had one last offensive possession, but did not advance past the Bills' 42-yard line.

Notes

Prior to this game, 32 Broncos' players decided to kneel during "The Star-Spangled Banner" after President Donald Trump made comments about the national anthem protests two days prior.

==== Week 4: vs. Oakland Raiders ====
Week Four: Oakland Raiders at Denver Broncos – Game summary

| Quarter | 1 | 2 | 3 | 4 | Total |
|---|---|---|---|---|---|
| Raiders | 0 | 7 | 0 | 3 | **10** |
| **Broncos** | 10 | 0 | 6 | 0 | **16** |

at Sports Authority Field at Mile High, Denver, Colorado

- Date: October 1
- Game time: 2:25 p.m. MDT
- Game weather: 72 °F (22 °C), mostly cloudy
- Game attendance: 76,909
- Referee: John Parry
- TV announcers (CBS): Jim Nantz, Tony Romo and Tracy Wolfson
- Recap, Gamebook

Game information

**First quarter**

- DEN – A.J. Derby 22-yard pass from Trevor Siemian (Brandon McManus kick), 8:11. Broncos 7–0. **Drive: 7 plays, 88 yards, 3:17.**
- DEN – Brandon McManus 28-yard field goal, 1:09. Broncos 10–0. **Drive: 8 plays, 79 yards, 4:08.**

**Second quarter**

- OAK – Johnny Holton 64-yard pass from Derek Carr, (Giorgio Tavecchio kick), 3:36. Broncos 10–7. **Drive: 5 plays, 99 yards, 2:23.**

**Third quarter**

- DEN – Brandon McManus 36-yard field goal, 9:40. Broncos 13–7. **Drive: 6 plays, 55 yards, 3:08.**
- DEN – Brandon McManus 46-yard field goal, 5:06. Broncos 16–7. **Drive: 5 plays, 3 yards, 2:07.**

**Fourth quarter**

- OAK – Georgio Tavecchio 38-yard field goal, 5:03. Broncos 16–10. **Drive: 9 plays, 73 yards, 3:07.**

**Top passers**

- OAK – Derek Carr – 10/18, 143 yards, 1 TD
- DEN – Trevor Siemian – 16/26, 179 yards, 1 TD

**Top rushers**

- OAK – Marshawn Lynch – 9 rushes, 12 yards
- DEN – C. J. Anderson – 20 rushes, 95 yards

**Top receivers**

- OAK – Johnny Holton – 1 reception, 64 yards, 1 TD
- DEN – A. J. Derby – 4 receptions, 75 yards, 1 TD

On the Broncos' second possession of the game, quarterback Trevor Siemian connecting on a 22-yard touchdown pass to tight end A. J. Derby. After forcing a Raiders' punt, Isaiah McKenzie returned a punt 64 yards to the Raiders' 15-yard line, but it was nullified by an illegal block penalty on Kasim Edebali. The Broncos marched down the field from their own 11-yard line to the Raiders' 6-yard line, but could not take advantage of the red zone opportunity, settling instead for a 28-yard field goal by placekicker Brandon McManus. After each team exchanged punts on their next two possessions, the Raiders got on the scoreboard late in the second quarter, with a 5-play, 99-yard drive, culminating in a 16-yard touchdown pass from quarterback Derek Carr to wide receiver Johnny Holton. McManus added a pair of field goals – from 36 and 46 yards out – to increase the Broncos' lead to 16–7. Late in the third quarter, Carr left the game due to a back injury, and backup quarterback EJ Manuel took over. The Broncos failed to take advantage of yet another red zone opportunity early in the fourth quarter, as a 29-yard field goal attempt by McManus hit the left upright. Following another exchange of punts, the Raiders narrowed the Broncos' lead to 16–10, with a 38-yard field goal by placekicker Giorgio Tavecchio with 5:27 left in the game. After the Broncos went three-and-out, the Raiders had one last possession with 4:16 remaining in the game, and reached the Broncos' 36-yard line at the 2-minute warning. After a false start penalty pushed the Raiders back five yards, a long pass attempt from Manuel intended for wide receiver Amari Cooper was intercepted by safety Justin Simmons, sealing the win for the Broncos. The Broncos' defense limited Marshawn Lynch to just 20 yards rushing on nine attempts.

==== Week 6: vs. New York Giants ====
Week Six: New York Giants at Denver Broncos – Game summary

| Quarter | 1 | 2 | 3 | 4 | Total |
|---|---|---|---|---|---|
| **Giants** | 3 | 14 | 3 | 3 | **23** |
| Broncos | 0 | 3 | 0 | 7 | **10** |

at Sports Authority Field at Mile High, Denver, Colorado

- Date: October 15
- Game time: 6:30 p.m. MDT
- Game weather: 61 °F (16 °C), clear
- Game attendance: 76,721
- Referee: Bill Vinovich
- TV announcers (NBC): Al Michaels, Cris Collinsworth and Michele Tafoya
- Recap, Gamebook

Game information

**First quarter**

- NYG – Aldrick Rosas 25-yard field goal, 6:54. Giants 3–0. **Drive: 13 plays, 69 yards, 7:02.**

**Second quarter**

- NYG – Evan Engram 5-yard pass from Eli Manning (Aldrick Rosas kick), 12:30. Giants 10–0. **Drive: 7 plays, 75 yards, 3:23.**
- DEN – Brandon McManus 28-yard field goal, 4:21. Giants 10–3. **Drive: 9 plays, 70 yards, 3:06.**
- NYG – Janoris Jenkins 43-yard interception return (Aldrick Rosas kick), 0:48. Giants 17–3.

**Third quarter**

- NYG – Aldrick Rosas 51-yard field goal, 8:08. Giants 20–3. **Drive: 6 plays, 30 yards, 2:45.**

**Fourth quarter**

- DEN – Jeff Heuerman 13-yard pass from Trevor Siemian (Brandon McManus kick), 4:07. Giants 20–10. **Drive: 7 plays, 58 yards, 2:03.**
- NYG – Aldrick Rosas 40-yard field goal, 0:27. Giants 23–10. **Drive: 7 plays, 19 yards, 3:40.**

**Top passers**

- NYG – Eli Manning – 11/19, 128 yards, TD
- DEN – Trevor Siemian – 29/50, 376 yards, TD, 2 INT

**Top rushers**

- NYG – Orleans Darkwa – 21 rushes, 117 yards
- DEN – Jamaal Charles – 5 rushes, 19 yards

**Top receivers**

- NYG – Evan Ingram – 5 receptions, 82 yards, TD
- DEN – Demaryius Thomas – 10 receptions, 133 yards

The Broncos' rush defense, which allowed a combined 95 yards in their first four games, surrendered 148 yards in a stunning home loss to the New York Giants, while the offense rushed for only 46 yards, after averaging 143 yards in the previous four games. Quarterback Trevor Siemian threw two interceptions, one of which was returned for a touchdown by Giants' cornerback Janoris Jenkins, while placekicker Brandon McManus missed a 33-yard field goal and had another attempt blocked. The Broncos' offensive woes in the red zone continued, scoring only one touchdown out of four opportunities. Backup quarterback Brock Osweiler saw brief action late in the first half, after Siemian sprained his shoulder on a diving attempt, as he unsuccessfully tried to prevent Jenkins from reaching the end zone after an interception.

Notes

This was the first of two games in which the Broncos wore their alternate all-navy blue jerseys – the other was Week 14 vs. the New York Jets.

==== Week 7: at Los Angeles Chargers ====
Week Seven: Denver Broncos at Los Angeles Chargers – Game summary

| Quarter | 1 | 2 | 3 | 4 | Total |
|---|---|---|---|---|---|
| Broncos | 0 | 0 | 0 | 0 | **0** |
| **Chargers** | 7 | 7 | 0 | 7 | **21** |

at StubHub Center, Carson, California

- Date: October 22
- Game time: 2:25 p.m. MDT/1:25 p.m. PDT
- Game weather: 90 °F (32 °C), sunny
- Game attendance: 25,388
- Referee: John Hussey
- TV announcers (CBS): Kevin Harlan, Rich Gannon and Amanda Balionis
- Recap, Gamebook

Game information

**First quarter**

- LAC – Travis Benjamin 65-yard punt return (Nick Novak kick), 7:27. Chargers 7–0.

**Second quarter**

- LAC – Austin Ekeler 1-yard pass from Philip Rivers (Nick Novak kick), 7:07. Chargers 14–0. **Drive: 9 plays, 65 yards, 5:55.**

**Third quarter**

- No scoring plays

**Fourth quarter**

- LAC – Travis Benjamin 42-yard pass from Philip Rivers (Nick Novak kick), 5:42. Chargers 21–0. **Drive: 10 plays, 92 yards, 6:53.**

**Top passers**

- DEN – Trevor Siemian – 25/35, 207 yards, INT
- LAC – Philip Rivers – 15/26, 183 yards, 2 TD

**Top rushers**

- DEN – C. J. Anderson – 10 rushes, 44 yards
- LAC – Austin Ekeler – 7 rushes, 38 yards, 1 receiving TD

**Top receivers**

- DEN – A. J. Derby – 6 receptions, 66 yards
- LAC – Hunter Henry – 4 receptions, 73 yards

The Broncos' were once again unable to solve their offensive woes, in a 21–0 loss to the Los Angeles Chargers. It was the Broncos' first shutout loss since 1992, snapping a 394-game scoring streak, which was the second-longest in NFL history. Chargers' wide receiver Travis Benjamin scored two touchdowns, one receiving and another on a punt return. Broncos' quarterback Trevor Siemian was sacked five times and lost two fumbles, while wide receiver Demaryius Thomas had an 81-yard pass play nullified by an offensive pass interference penalty.

==== Week 8: at Kansas City Chiefs ====
Week Eight: Denver Broncos at Kansas City Chiefs – Game summary

| Quarter | 1 | 2 | 3 | 4 | Total |
|---|---|---|---|---|---|
| Broncos | 0 | 3 | 10 | 6 | **19** |
| **Chiefs** | 14 | 3 | 3 | 9 | **29** |

at Arrowhead Stadium, Kansas City, Missouri

- Date: October 30
- Game time: 7:30 p.m. CDT/6:30 p.m. MDT
- Game weather: 44 °F (7 °C), clear
- Game attendance: 76,573
- Referee: Tony Corrente
- TV announcers (ESPN): Sean McDonough, Jon Gruden and Lisa Salters
- Recap, Gamebook

Game information

**First quarter**

- KC – Marcus Peters 45-yard fumble return (Harrison Butker kick), 9:29. Chiefs 7–0.
- KC – Travis Kelce 29-yard pass from Alex Smith (Harrison Butker kick), 6:11. Chiefs 14–0. **Drive: 5 plays, 68 yards, 1:39.**

**Second quarter**

- DEN – Brandon McManus 27-yard field goal, 11:48. Chiefs 14–3. **Drive: 13 plays, 71 yards, 7:07.**
- KC – Harrison Butker 25-yard field goal, 5:02. Chiefs 17–3. **Drive: 7 plays, 47 yards, 4:05.**

**Third quarter**

- KC – Harrison Butker 32-yard field goal, 12:30. Chiefs 20–3. **Drive: 4 plays, 2 yards, 0:54.**
- DEN – Brandon McManus 34-yard field goal, 8:11. Chiefs 20–6. **Drive: 9 plays, 60 yards, 4:19.**
- DEN – Devontae Booker 6-yard run (Brandon McManus kick), 1:14. Chiefs 20–13. **Drive: 10 plays, 80 yards, 5:44.**

**Fourth quarter**

- KC – Harrison Butker 43-yard field goal, 12:30. Chiefs 23–13. **Drive: 8 plays, 50 yards, 3:44.**
- KC – Harrison Butker 51-yard field goal, 7:03. Chiefs 26–13. **Drive: 6 plays, 15 yards, 3:03.**
- KC – Harrison Butker 42-yard field goal, 4:41. Chiefs 29–13. **Drive: 4 plays, –2 yards, 1:42.**
- DEN – A. J. Derby 11-yard pass from Trevor Siemian (pass failed), 1:55. Chiefs 29–19. **Drive: 10 plays, 75 yards, 2:46.**

**Top passers**

- DEN – Trevor Siemian – 19/36, 198 yards, TD, 3 INT
- KC – Alex Smith – 14/31, 202 yards, TD

**Top rushers**

- DEN – C. J. Anderson – 15 rushes, 78 yards
- KC – Kareem Hunt – 22 rushes, 46 yards

**Top receivers**

- DEN – Demaryius Thomas – 5 receptions, 66 yards
- KC – Travis Kelce – 7 receptions, 133 yards, TD

The Broncos' defense limited the Chiefs to 279 total yards – 133 of which went to tight end Travis Kelce. However, the Broncos were unable to overcome five turnovers, including three interceptions by quarterback Trevor Siemian, as well as a fumble by running back Jamaal Charles that resulted in a Chiefs' touchdown. After trailing 20–3 early in the third quarter, the Broncos narrowed the Chiefs' lead to 20–13, following a 6-yard touchdown by running back Devontae Booker. However, three fourth-quarter field goals by Chiefs' placekicker Harrison Butker – the latter two of which occurred after a Broncos' turnover on downs and Siemian's third interception of the game, increased the Chiefs' lead to 29–13. With 4:41 remaining in the game, the Broncos' attempted a rally, with Siemian connecting on an 11-yard touchdown pass to tight end A. J. Derby at the two-minute warning. However, the two-point conversion attempt was unsuccessful, which would have brought the Broncos' to within a one-score deficit, ending the Broncos' rally attempt.

Notes:

This was Jamaal Charles' first game against the Chiefs, for whom he played the first nine seasons of his career.

==== Week 9: at Philadelphia Eagles ====
Week Nine: Denver Broncos at Philadelphia Eagles – Game summary

| Quarter | 1 | 2 | 3 | 4 | Total |
|---|---|---|---|---|---|
| Broncos | 3 | 6 | 0 | 14 | **23** |
| **Eagles** | 17 | 14 | 13 | 7 | **51** |

at Lincoln Financial Field, Philadelphia, Pennsylvania

- Date: November 5
- Game time: 1:00 p.m. EST/11:00 am. MST
- Game weather: 61 °F (16 °C), cloudy
- Game attendance: 69,596
- Referee: Gene Steratore
- TV announcers (CBS): Ian Eagle, Dan Fouts and Evan Washburn
- Recap, Gamebook

Game information

**First quarter**

- DEN – Brandon McManus 52-yard field goal, 10:35. Broncos 3–0. **Drive: 9 plays, 41 yards, 4:25.**
- PHI – Alshon Jeffery 32-yard pass from Carson Wentz (Jake Elliott kick), 6:34. Eagles 7–3. **Drive: 7 plays, 75 yards, 4:01.**
- PHI – Jake Elliott 45-yard field goal, 1:53. Eagles 10–3. **Drive: 6 plays, 29 yards, 2:14.**
- PHI– Corey Clement 15-yard pass from Carson Wentz (Jake Elliott kick), 0:53. Eagles 17–3. **Drive: 3 plays, 15 yards, 0:51.**

**Second quarter**

- DEN – Brandon McManus 53-yard FG, 11:05. Eagles 17–6. **Drive: 4 plays, 8 yards, 1:00.**
- PHI – Trey Burton 27-yard pass from Carson Wentz (Jake Elliott kick), 9:15. Eagles 24–6. **Drive: 6 plays, 75 yards, 1:50.**
- DEN – Brandon McManus 24-yard FG, 3:03. Eagles 24–9. **Drive: 12 plays, 69 yards, 6:12.**
- PHI – Jay Ajayi 46-yard run (J.Elliott kick), 1:20. Eagles 31–9. **Drive: 4 plays, 75 yards, 1:43).**

**Third quarter**

- PHI – Corey Clement 2-yard run (Jake Elliott kick), 7:32. Eagles 38–9. **Drive: 13 plays, 77 yards, 7:28.**
- PHI – Alshon Jeffery 4-yard pass from Carson Wentz (kick failed), 3:00. Eagles 44–9. **Drive: 3 plays, 11 yards, 1:25.**

**Fourth quarter**

- DEN – Demaryius Thomas 1-yard pass from Brock Osweiler (Brandon McManus kick), 9:45. Eagles 44–16. **Drive: 13 plays, 75 yards, 8:15.**
- DEN – Brandon Marshall 19-yard fumble return (Brandon McManus kick), 8:09. Eagles 44–23.
- PHI – Corey Clement 4-yard run (Jake Elliott kick), 4:44. Eagles 51–23. **Drive: 5 plays, 48 yards, 3:25.**

**Top passers**

- DEN – Brock Osweiler – 19/38, 208 yards, TD, 2 INT
- PHI – Carson Wentz – 15/27, 199 yards, 4 TD

**Top rushers**

- DEN – Devontae Booker – 6 rushes, 21 yards
- PHI – Jay Ajayi – 8 rushes, 77 yards, TD

**Top receivers**

- DEN – Demaryius Thomas – 8 receptions, 70 yards, TD
- PHI – Alshon Jeffery – 6 receptions, 84 yards, 2 TD

The Broncos' defense, who were the only defensive unit who had not allowed any rushing touchdowns, surrendered three rushing touchdowns, and Eagles' quarterback Carson Wentz threw four touchdown passes, in a 51–23 rout of the Broncos. The defense surrendered 50+ points for the first time since 2010, and backup quarterback Brock Osweiler, starting in place of an ineffective Trevor Siemian, threw two interceptions and nearly threw three more. The Broncos did not reach the end zone until the fourth quarter, when wide receiver Demaryius Thomas scored his first touchdown of the season – on a 1-yard pass from Osweiler, and linebacker Brandon Marshall returned a fumble 19 yards for a touchdown. Both touchdowns occurred when the game had already been decided in the Eagles' favor.

==== Week 10: vs. New England Patriots ====
Week Ten: New England Patriots at Denver Broncos – Game summary

| Quarter | 1 | 2 | 3 | 4 | Total |
|---|---|---|---|---|---|
| **Patriots** | 14 | 13 | 7 | 7 | **41** |
| Broncos | 6 | 3 | 7 | 0 | **16** |

at Sports Authority Field at Mile High, Denver, Colorado

- Date: November 12
- Game time: 6:30 p.m. MST
- Game weather: 48 °F (9 °C), partly cloudy
- Game attendance: 76,820
- Referee: Walt Coleman
- TV announcers (NBC): Al Michaels, Cris Collinsworth and Michele Tafoya
- Recap, Gamebook

Game information

**First quarter**

- NE – Rex Burkhead 14-yard pass from Tom Brady (Stephen Gostkowski kick), 12:43. Patriots 7–0. **Drive: 2 plays, 24 yards, 0:46.**
- DEN – Brandon McManus 39-yard field goal, 8:42. Patriots 7–3. **Drive: 8 plays, 58 yards, 3:57.**
- NE – Dion Lewis 103-yard kick return (Stephen Gostkowski kick), 8:24. Patriots 14–3.
- DEN – Brandon McManus 33-yard field goal, 5:22. Patriots 14–6. **Drive: 8 plays, 64 yards, 3:06.**

**Second quarter**

- NE – Stephen Gostkowski 25-yard field goal, 13:41. Patriots 17–6. **Drive: 14 plays, 68 yards, 6:40.**
- NE – Stephen Gostkowski 28-yard field goal, 8:51. Patriots 20–6. **Drive: 5 plays, 20 yards, 1:51.**
- DEN – Brandon McManus 36-yard field goal, 2:40. Patriots 20–9. **Drive: 12 plays, 63 yards, 6:11.**
- NE – Duane Allen 11-yard pass from Tom Brady (Stephen Gostkowski kick), 0:31. Patriots 27–9. **Drive: 9 plays, 64 yards, 2:11.**

**Third quarter**

- DEN – Demaryius Thomas 7-yard pass from Brock Osweiler (Brandon McManus kick), 8:01. Patriots 27–16. **Drive: 13 plays, 75 yards, 7:06.**
- NE – Dion Lewis 8-yard run (Stephen Gostkowski kick), 4:38. Patriots 34–16. **Drive: 7 plays, 75 yards, 3:18.**

**Fourth quarter**

- DEN – James White 6-yard pass from Tom Brady (Stephen Gostkowski kick), Patriots 41–16. **Drive: 16 plays, 94 yards, 7:31.**

**Top passers**

- NE – Tom Brady – 25/34, 266 yards, 3 TD
- DEN – Brock Osweiler – 18/33, 221 yards, TD, INT

**Top rushers**

- NE – Dion Lewis – 14 rushes, 55 yards, TD
- DEN – C. J. Anderson – 10 rushes, 54 yards

**Top receivers**

- NE – (tie) Brandin Cooks – 6 receptions, 74 yards; Rob Gronkowski – 4 receptions, 74 yards
- DEN – Emmanuel Sanders – 6 receptions, 137 yards

The Broncos' defense forced a three-and-out on the Patriots' first offensive drive, however, it was all downhill for the Broncos after that. The Patriots capitalized on four blunders by the Broncos' special teams. First, Isaiah McKenzie muffed a punt, giving the Patriots a short field. Then, Patriots' return specialist Dion Lewis returned a kickoff 103 yards for a touchdown. The Patriots also blocked a punt, and a defensive penalty on a Patriots' punt resulted in a first down as well as another touchdown. Patriots' quarterback Tom Brady threw for 266 yards and three touchdown passes. Offensively, the Broncos had to settle for three Brandon McManus field goals and achieved only one touchdown – a 7-yard pass from Brock Osweiler to wide receiver Demaryius Thomas.

==== Week 11: vs. Cincinnati Bengals ====
Week Eleven: Cincinnati Bengals at Denver Broncos – Game summary

| Quarter | 1 | 2 | 3 | 4 | Total |
|---|---|---|---|---|---|
| **Bengals** | 6 | 7 | 0 | 7 | **20** |
| Broncos | 7 | 0 | 3 | 7 | **17** |

at Sports Authority Field at Mile High, Denver, Colorado

- Date: November 19
- Game time: 2:25 p.m. MST
- Game weather: 60 °F (16 °C), mostly cloudy
- Game attendance: 75,707
- Referee: Craig Wrolstad
- TV announcers (CBS): Greg Gumbel, Trent Green and Jamie Erdahl
- Recap, Gamebook

Game information

**First quarter**

- CIN – Tyler Kroft 1-yard pass from Andy Dalton (kick failed, wide left), 7:11. Bengals 6–0. **Drive: 3 plays, 1 yard, 1:17.**
- DEN – C. J. Anderson 3-yard tun (Brandon McManus kick), 0:45. Broncos 7–6. **Drive: 14 plays, 75 yards, 6:25.**

**Second quarter**

- CIN – Alex Erickson 29-yard pass from Andy Dalton (Randy Bullock kick), 13:01. Bengals 13–7. **Drive: 7 plays, 75 yards, 2:46.**

**Third quarter**

- DEN – Brandon McManus 45-yard field goal, 4:58. Bengals 13–10. **Drive: 7 plays, 17 yards, 2:14.**

**Fourth quarter**

- CIN – A. J. Green 18-yard pass from Andy Dalton (Randy Bullock kick), 9:02. Bengals 20–10. **Drive: 6 plays, 44 yards, 3:17.**
- DEN – Demaryius Thomas 17-yard pass from Brock Osweiler, 5:12. Bengals 20–17. **Drive: 10 plays, 75 yards, 3:51.**

**Top passers**

- CIN – Andy Dalton – 15/25, 154 yards, 3 TD
- DEN – Brock Osweiler – 23/42, TD, INT

**Top rushers**

- CIN – Joe Mixon – 20 rushes, 49 yards
- DEN – Devontae Booker – 14 rushes, 44 yards

**Top receivers**

- CIN – A. J. Green – 4 receptions, 50 yards, TD
- DEN – Demaryius Thomas – 5 receptions, 64 yards, TD

Two turnovers proved costly for the Broncos, as they suffered their sixth consecutive loss, and their first loss at home to the Bengals in more than 40 seasons. After the Broncos blocked a punt on the Bengals' opening possession, quarterback Brock Osweiler was intercepted by Bengals' cornerback Dre Kirkpatrick, who returned the football 101 yards for a near-touchdown. The Broncos trailed 13–10 early in the fourth quarter, when running back C. J. Anderson was hit by Bengals' linebacker Vontaze Burfict, and lost a fumble. The Bengals grabbed a 20–10 lead with nine minutes remaining in the game, with quarterback Andy Dalton connecting on an 18-yard touchdown pass to wide receiver A. J. Green. The Broncos pulled to within a 20–17 deficit with five minutes remaining, when Osweiler connected on a 17-yard touchdown pass to wide receiver Demaryius Thomas. After being forced to use all of their team timeouts, the Broncos forced a Bengals' punt at the two-minute warning, and had one last offensive possession at their own 20-yard line. However, after four plays, the Broncos turned the football over on downs, sealing the win for the Bengals. Broncos' placekicker Brandon McManus had a 61-yard field goal attempt blocked just before halftime.

Notes

The Broncos honored former head coach Red Miller and former running back Terrell Davis. Miller, who led the Broncos to their first Super Bowl appearance in 1977, was inducted into the Broncos' Ring of Fame. Miller died on September 27, 2017, at the age of 89. Davis, who was inducted into the Pro Football Hall of Fame in August, was honored in a pre-game ceremony. Davis led the Broncos to back-to-back victories in Super Bowls XXXII and XXXIII.

==== Week 12: at Oakland Raiders ====
Week Twelve: Denver Broncos at Oakland Raiders – Game summary

| Quarter | 1 | 2 | 3 | 4 | Total |
|---|---|---|---|---|---|
| Broncos | 0 | 0 | 0 | 14 | **14** |
| **Raiders** | 0 | 14 | 7 | 0 | **21** |

at Oakland–Alameda County Coliseum, Oakland, California

- Date: November 26
- Game time: 2:25 p.m. MST/1:25 p.m. PST
- Game weather: 61 °F (16 °C), cloudy
- Game attendance: 54,994
- Referee: Walt Anderson
- TV announcers (CBS): Kevin Harlan and Rich Gannon
- Recap, Gamebook

Game information

**First quarter**

- No scoring plays.

**Second quarter**

- OAK – Amari Cooper 9-yard pass from Derek Carr (Giorgio Tavecchio kick), 8:47. Raiders 7–0. **Drive: 8 plays, 80 yards, 5:21.**
- OAK – Marshawn Lynch 1-yard run (Giorgio Tavecchio kick), 2:53. Raiders 14–0. **Drive: 8 plays, 52 yards, 4:00.**

**Third quarter**

- OAK – Jalen Richard 6-yard pass from Derek Carr (Giorgio Tavecchio kick), 6:27. Raiders 21–0. **Drive: 7 plays, 66 yards, 4:46.**

**Fourth quarter**

- DEN – Cody Latimer 25-yard pass from Trevor Siemian (Brandon McManus kick), 10:26. Raiders 21–7. **Drive: 10 plays, 93 yards, 3:48.**
- DEN – Bennie Fowler 22-yard pass from Trevor Siemian (Brandon McManus kick), 2:44. Raiders 21–14. **Drive: 12 plays, 75 yards, 3:07.**

**Top passers**

- DEN – Trevor Siemian – 11/21, 149 yards, 2 TD
- OAK – Derek Carr – 18/24, 253 yards, 2 TD

**Top rushers**

- DEN – Paxton Lynch – 2 rushes, 20 yards
- OAK – Marshawn Lynch – 26 rushes, 67 yards, TD

**Top receivers**

- DEN – Cody Latimer – 3 receptions, 48 yards, TD
- OAK – Cordarrelle Patterson – 3 receptions, 72 yards

With Paxton Lynch as the starting quarterback, the Broncos' offense did not advance past their own 37-yard line on eight of their first ten possessions – excluding a fumble recovery in Raiders' territory and a kneel down before halftime. Paxton Lynch was the team's leading rusher, with only 20 yards. On the Raiders' second offensive possession, a brawl erupted between cornerback Aqib Talib and Raiders' wide receiver Michael Crabtree, resulting in both players being ejected from the game. Raiders' guard Gabe Jackson was also ejected for making contact with an official during the brawl. After a strip sack and forced fumble off quarterback Derek Carr deep in Raiders' territory, the Broncos had a first and goal at the 1-yard line, however, Paxton Lynch threw a pass that was deflected and intercepted by linebacker NaVorro Bowman in the end zone. A 9-yard touchdown pass from Carr to wide receiver Amari Cooper, coupled with a 1-yard touchdown run by running back Marshawn Lynch, gave the Raiders a 14–0 lead before halftime. The lead was increased to 21–0 early in the third quarter, with a 6-yard touchdown pass from Carr to running back Jalen Richard.

After Paxton Lynch suffered an ankle injury, he was replaced by Trevor Siemian late in the third quarter, and got the Broncos on the scoreboard at the 10:26 mark of the fourth quarter, with a 25-yard touchdown pass to wide receiver Cody Latimer. The Raiders drove to the Broncos' 17-yard line on their next possession, chewing up nearly five minutes off the clock, and were attempting to add to their lead. However, a 35-yard field goal attempt by placekicker Giorgio Tavecchio missed wide left. Siemian engineered a 12-play, 75-yard drive and pulled the Broncos to within a 21–14 deficit with 2:44 remaining in the game, after a 22-yard touchdown pass to wide receiver Bennie Fowler III. The Broncos were hoping for a defensive stop just before the two-minute warning, but after using the last two of their three team timeouts, Carr connected on a 31-yard pass to wide receiver Cordarrelle Patterson on a 3rd-and-8, sealing the win for the Raiders. With the loss, the Broncos exceeded their loss total from 2016.

==== Week 13: at Miami Dolphins ====
Week Thirteen: Denver Broncos at Miami Dolphins – Game summary

| Quarter | 1 | 2 | 3 | 4 | Total |
|---|---|---|---|---|---|
| Broncos | 0 | 3 | 6 | 0 | **9** |
| **Dolphins** | 2 | 14 | 10 | 9 | **35** |

at Hard Rock Stadium, Miami Gardens, Florida

- Date: December 3
- Game time: 1:00 p.m. EST/11:00 am. MST
- Game weather: 80 °F (27 °C), cloudy
- Game attendance: 65,092
- Referee: Carl Cheffers
- TV announcers (Fox): Dick Stockton, Mark Schlereth and Shannon Spake
- Recap, Gamebook

Game information

**First quarter**

- MIA – Matt Paradis fumble out of bounds in the end zone, 3:07. Dolphins 2–0.

**Second quarter**

- DEN – Brandon McManus 31-yard field goal, 13:28. Broncos 3–2. **Drive: 7 plays, 67 yards, 2:57.**
- MIA – Julius Thomas 9-yard pass from Jay Cutler (Cody Parkey kick), 9:39. Dolphins 9–3. **Drive: 9 plays, 75 yards, 3:49.**
- MIA – Xavien Howard 30-yard interception return (Cody Parkey kick), 9:32. Dolphins 16–3.

**Third quarter**

- MIA – Cody Parkey 37-yard field goal, 10:32. Dolphins 19–3. **Drive: 5 plays, 28 yards, 2:45.**
- DEN – Justin Simmons 65-yard interception return (two-point conversion failed), 4:56. Dolphins 19–9.
- MIA – Kenyan Drake 42-yard run (Cody Parkey kick), 2:54. Dolphins 26–9. **Drive: 4 plays, 61 yards, 2:02.**

**Fourth quarter**

- MIA – Kenny Stills 23-yard pass from Jay Cutler (Cody Parkey kick), 10:21. Dolphins 33–9. **Drive: 1 play, 23 yards, 0:06.**
- MIA – Isaiah McKenzie tackled in the end zone by Senorise Perry, 8:49. Dolphins 35–9.

**Top passers**

- DEN – Trevor Siemian – 19/41, 200 yards, 3 INT
- MIA – Jay Cutler – 18/31, 235 yards, 2 TD, 2 INT

**Top rushers**

- DEN – C. J. Anderson – 15 carries, 67 yards
- MIA – Kenyan Drake – 23 carries, 120 yards, TD

**Top receivers**

- DEN – C. J. Anderson – 4 receptions, 43 yards
- MIA – Kenny Stills – 5 receptions, 98 yards, TD

A 65-yard interception return by Justin Simmons of Dolphins' quarterback Jay Cutler was the Broncos' only touchdown of the game, as the offense only managed one other scoring play – a 31-yard field goal by placekicker Brandon McManus. The Broncos surrendered two safeties – one off a fumbled snap and the other when Isaiah McKenzie muffed a punt in the end zone, and also had a punt blocked. Quarterback Trevor Siemian threw three interceptions – one of which was returned for a touchdown, the offense went 1-for-13 on third down and gained 270 net yards, their lowest output of the season.

==== Week 14: vs. New York Jets ====
Week Fourteen: New York Jets at Denver Broncos – Game summary

| Quarter | 1 | 2 | 3 | 4 | Total |
|---|---|---|---|---|---|
| Jets | 0 | 0 | 0 | 0 | **0** |
| **Broncos** | 10 | 3 | 7 | 3 | **23** |

at Sports Authority Field at Mile High, Denver, Colorado

- Date: December 10
- Game time: 2:05 p.m. MST
- Game weather: 60 °F (16 °C), sunny
- Game attendance: 75,518
- Referee: Tony Corrente
- TV announcers (CBS): Greg Gumbel, Trent Green and Jamie Erdahl
- Recap, Gamebook

Game information

**First quarter**

- DEN – Brandon McManus 31-yard field goal, 9:02. Broncos 3–0. **Drive: 12 plays, 62 yards, 5:58.**
- DEN – Demaryius Thomas 20-yard pass from Trevor Siemian (Brandon McManus kick), 7:16. Broncos 10–0. **Drive: 2 plays, 20 yards, 0:12.**

**Second quarter**

- DEN – Brandon McManus 53-yard field goal, 0:32. Broncos 13–0. **Drive: 10 plays, 28 yards, 5:58.**

**Third quarter**

- DEN – Andy Janovich 1-yard run (Brandon McManus kick), 6:30. Broncos 20–0. **Drive: 13 plays, 68 yards, 6:19.**

**Fourth quarter**

- DEN – Brandon McManus 40-yard field goal, 11:33. Broncos 23–0. **Drive: 8 plays, 37 yards, 4:44.**

**Top passers**

- NYJ – Josh McCown – 6/12, 46 yards, INT
- DEN – Trevor Siemian – 19/31, 200 yards, TD

**Top rushers**

- NYJ – Bilal Powell – 13 rushes, 35 yards
- DEN – C. J. Anderson – 22 rushes, 48 yards

**Top receivers**

- NYJ – Robby Anderson – 3 receptions, 27 yards
- DEN – Demaryius Thomas – 8 receptions, 93 yards, TD

The Broncos' defense allowed the Jets' offense to advance past midfield only twice out of 12 opportunities, in a 23–0 win, as the Broncos snapped an 8–game losing streak – the team's longest since 1967. It was the Broncos' first shutout win since 2005 – also against the Jets. Offensively, the Broncos did not commit any turnovers, and after forcing a Jets' fumble on their first possession, quarterback Trevor Siemian threw a 20-yard touchdown pass to wide receiver Demaryius Thomas. Fullback Andy Janovich added another touchdown in the third quarter, and placekicker Brandon McManus added three field goals, though he missed a 29-yard attempt early in the second quarter. The Broncos, however, were officially eliminated from playoff contention as the result of wins by the Kansas City Chiefs and Los Angeles Chargers.

Notes

The Broncos wore their alternate navy blue jerseys for this game.

==== Week 15: at Indianapolis Colts ====
Week Fifteen: Denver Broncos at Indianapolis Colts – Game summary

| Quarter | 1 | 2 | 3 | 4 | Total |
|---|---|---|---|---|---|
| **Broncos** | 0 | 7 | 15 | 3 | **25** |
| Colts | 7 | 3 | 3 | 0 | **13** |

at Lucas Oil Stadium, Indianapolis, Indiana

- Date: December 14
- Game time: 8:25 p.m. EST/6:25 p.m. MST
- Game weather: Played indoors (retractable roof closed)
- Game attendance: 63,411
- Referee: Terry McAulay
- TV announcers (NBC/NFLN/Amazon Video): Mike Tirico, Cris Collinsworth and Heather Cox
- Recacp, Gamebook

Game information

**First quarter**

- IND – Jacoby Brissett 7-yard run (Adam Vinatieri kick), 8:02. Colts 7–0. **Drive: 7 plays, 50 yards, 3:32.**

**Second quarter**

- IND – Adam Vinatieri 45-yard FG, 6:33. Colts 10–0. **Drive: 10 plays, 59 yards, 6:04.**
- DEN – Brock Osweiler 18-yard run (Brandon McManus kick), 1:19. Colts 10–7. **Drive: 11 plays, 75 yards, 5:14.**

**Third quarter**

- IND – Adam Vinatieri 39-yard FG, 9:13. Colts 13–7. **Drive: 12 plays, 54 yards, 5:47.**
- DEN – Cody Latimer 22-yard pass from Brock Osweiler (Brandon McManus kick), 4:16. Broncos 14–13. **Drive: 9 plays, 79 yards, 4:57.**
- DEN – Jeff Heuerman 54-yard pass from Brock Osweiler (Brock Osweiler–Cody Latimer pass), 2:37. Broncos 22–13. **Drive: 3 plays, 67 yards, 1:17.**

**Fourth quarter**

- DEN – Brandon McManus 40-yard FG, 5:13. Broncos 25–13. **Drive: 16 plays, 62 yards, 9:40.**

**Top passers**

- DEN – Brock Osweiler – 12/17, 194 yards, 2 TD, 1 rushing TD
- IND – Jacoby Brissett – 17/30, 158 yards, 1 rushing TD

**Top rushers**

- DEN – C. J. Anderson – 30 rushes, 158 yards
- IND – Frank Gore – 10 rushes, 31 yards

**Top receivers**

- DEN – Demaryius Thomas – 5 rushes, 69 yards
- IND – Jack Doyle – 7 receptions, 47 yards

The Broncos spotted the Colts a 10–0 lead, with quarterback Jacoby Brissett rushing for a 7-yard touchdown, followed in the second quarter by a 45-yard field goal by placekicker Adam Vinatieri. The former occurred after an interception of quarterback Trevor Siemian on the Broncos' initial possession. Siemian was knocked out of the game late in the first quarter due to a shoulder injury, after being sacked by Colts' linebacker Barkevious Mingo. Brock Osweiler took over early in the second quarter, and got the Broncos on the scoreboard just before halftime, with an 18-yard touchdown run. A 39-yard field goal by Vinatieri on the Colts' initial possession of the second half increased the lead to 13–7; however, the Broncos' defense held the Colts scoreless for the remainder of the game. The Broncos claimed the lead for good with a pair of touchdown passes from Osweiler – a 22-yarder to wide receiver Cody Latimer, followed by a 54-yarder to tight end Jeff Heuerman (with a successful two-point conversion). Placekicker Brandon McManus added a 40-yard field goal with 5:18 remaining in the game, on a drive that chewed up 9:40 off the clock. It was the Broncos' only road win of the season.

Notes

The Broncos snapped a 6-game losing streak in Indianapolis, dating back to 2003 (including the playoffs).

==== Week 16: at Washington Redskins ====
Week Sixteen: Denver Broncos at Washington Redskins – Game summary

| Quarter | 1 | 2 | 3 | 4 | Total |
|---|---|---|---|---|---|
| Broncos | 3 | 0 | 0 | 8 | **11** |
| **Redskins** | 0 | 10 | 3 | 14 | **27** |

at FedExField, Landover, Maryland

- Date: December 24
- Game time: 1:00 p.m. EST/11:00 am. MST
- Game weather: 43 °F (6 °C), cloudy
- Game attendance: 72,889
- Referee: Ed Hochuli
- TV announcers (CBS): Spero Dedes and Adam Archuleta
- Recap, Gamebook

Game information

**First quarter**

- DEN – Brandon McManus 31-yard FG, 2:06. Broncos 3–0. **Drive: 10 plays, 33 yards, 5:55.**

**Second quarter**

- WAS – Dustin Hopkins 26-yard FG, 6:15. tied 3–3. **Drive: 11 plays, 83 yards, 5:17.**
- WAS – Jamison Crowder 15-yard pass from Kirk Cousins (Dustin Hopkins kick), 2:07. Redskins 10–3. **Drive: 5 plays, 38 yards, 2:26.**

**Third quarter**

- WAS – 3:30 Dustin Hopkins 29-yard FG, 3:30. Redskins 13–3. **Drive: 9 plays, 55 yards, 4:26.**

**Fourth quarter**

- WAS – Josh Doctson 48-yard pass from Kirk Cousins (Dustin Hopkins kick), 12:07. Redskins 20–3. **Drive: 5 plays, 77 yards, 2:41.**
- WAS – Vernon Davis 31-yard pass from Kirk Cousins (Dustin Hopkins kick), 4:21. Redskins 27–3. **Drive: 3 plays, 35 yards, 0:20.**
- DEN – C. J. Anderson 5-yard run (Brock Osweiler–C. J Anderson pass), 1:18. Redskins 27–11. **Drive: 11 plays, 75 yards, 3:03.**

**Top passers**

- DEN – Brock Osweiler – 22/38, 193 yards, INT
- WAS – Kirk Cousins – 19/37, 299 yards, 3 TD, INT

**Top rushers**

- DEN – C. J. Anderson – 16 rushes, 88 yards, TD
- WAS – Samaje Perine – 17 rushes, 53 yards

**Top receivers**

- DEN – Demaryius Thomas – 4 receptions, 52 yards
- WAS – Ryan Grant – receptions, 85 yards

A 31-yard field goal by placekicker Brandon McManus gave the Broncos a 3–0 lead late in the first quarter. However, the Redskins reeled off 27 unanswered points, and the same offensive mistakes that plagued the Broncos during their 8-game losing streak resurfaced. The defense allowed Redskins' quarterback Kirk Cousins to pass for 299 yards and three touchdowns. The Broncos' lone touchdown came late in the fourth quarter – a 5-yard run by running back C. J. Anderson, by which time the game had already been decided in the Redskins' favor.

Notes

This was the Broncos' final game against Washington under the "Redskins" moniker – home or away, as Washington adopted a temporary moniker in 2020.

==== Week 17: vs. Kansas City Chiefs ====
Week Seventeen: Kansas City Chiefs at Denver Broncos – Game summary

| Quarter | 1 | 2 | 3 | 4 | Total |
|---|---|---|---|---|---|
| **Chiefs** | 7 | 7 | 10 | 3 | **27** |
| Broncos | 3 | 7 | 0 | 14 | **24** |

at Sports Authority Field at Mile High, Denver, Colorado

- Date: December 31
- Game time: 2:25 p.m. MST
- Game weather: 17 °F (−8 °C), cloudy
- Game attendance: 75,928
- Referee: Clete Blakeman
- TV announcers (CBS): Beth Mowins and Jay Feely
- Recap, Gamebook

Game information

**First quarter**

- KC – Kareem Hunt 35-yard run (Harrison Butker kick), 14:03. Chiefs 7–0. **Drive: 5 plays, 86 yards, 0:57.**
- DEN – Brandon McManus 36-yard FG, 5:22. Chiefs 7–3. **Drive: 12 plays, 72 yards, 6:38.**

**Second quarter**

- DEN – De'Angelo Henderson 29-yard pass from Paxton Lynch (Brandon McManus kick), 4:56. Broncos 10–7. **Drive: 10 plays, 80 yards, 5:42.**
- KC – Anthony Sherman 1-yard run (Harrison Butker kick), 1:07. Chiefs 14–10. **Drive: 8 plays, 73 yards, 3:49.**

**Third quarter**

- KC – Harrison Butker 20-yard FG, 3:58. Chiefs 17–10. **Drive: 18 plays, 90 yards, 8:46.**
- KC – Ramik Wilson 11-yard fumble return (Harrison Butker kick), 3:04. Chiefs 24–10.

**Fourth quarter**

- DEN – Zaire Anderson 38-yard fumble return (Brandon McManus kick), 6:52. Chiefs 24–17.
- DEN – Demaryius Thomas 6-yard pass from Paxton Lynch (Brandon McManus kick), 2:53. tied 24–24. **Drive: 8 plays, 62 yards, 2:23.**
- KC – Harrison Butker 30-yard field goal, 0:00. Chiefs 27–24. **Drive: 11 plays, 67 yards, 2:53.**

**Top passers**

- KC – Patrick Mahomes – 22/35, 284 yards, INT
- DEN – Paxton Lynch – 21/31, 254 yards, 2 TD, 2 INT

**Top rushers**

- KC – Anthony Sherman – 14 rushes, 40 yards, TD
- DEN – C. J. Anderson – 18 rushes, 61 yards

**Top receivers**

- KC – Albert Wilson – 10 receptions, 147 yards
- DEN – Jordan Taylor – 6 receptions, 65 yards

In their final game of the season, the Broncos took a 10–7 lead over the Chiefs, before the Chiefs reeled off 17 unanswered points to take a 24–10 lead, which included a fumble return by Chiefs' linebacker Ramik Wilson for a touchdown. The Broncos pulled even with the Chiefs at 24–24 with 2:53 remaining in the game, which included a fumble return by linebacker Zaire Anderson for a touchdown. However, Chiefs' quarterback Patrick Mahomes, playing in place of regular starter Alex Smith, engineered a game-winning drive, culminating in a 30-yard field goal by placekicker Harrison Butker as time expired. Paxton Lynch, in only his second start of the season, threw two touchdown passes – one to running back De'Angelo Henderson and another to wide receiver Demaryius Thomas, but also threw two interceptions.

Notes

Running back C. J. Anderson reached the 1,000-yard rushing plateau for the first time in his career, as well as becoming the first Broncos' running back since Knowshon Moreno in 2013 to do so. Wide receiver Demaryius Thomas fell 51 yards short of reaching 1,000 receiving yards for a sixth consecutive season. The Broncos lost their fifth consecutive game against the Chiefs – the team's longest losing skid against the Chiefs since a six-game streak from 1970 to 1973.

=== Quarterback carousel ===
Trevor Siemian was named the starting quarterback on August 21, two days after the Broncos' second preseason game vs. the San Francisco 49ers. It was the second consecutive season that Siemian beat out Paxton Lynch, the team's 2016 first-round draft selection, for the starting quarterback position. However, after a four-touchdown performance against the Dallas Cowboys in Week 2, Siemian struggled with turnovers and inconsistent play, and was benched in favor of Brock Osweiler, who was re-signed by the Broncos just before the start of the season, and designated as Siemian's backup. Osweiler was named the starter on November 1, four days before the team's Week 9 game at the Philadelphia Eagles. However, Osweiler suffered through the same struggles as Siemian. Lynch, who had been inactive for the first ten games of the season due to an injury to his throwing shoulder during the preseason, was named the starter on November 22, four days prior to team's Week 12 game at the Oakland Raiders. This change occurred immediately after Bill Musgrave was named offensive coordinator, following the firing of Mike McCoy. After Lynch suffered an ankle injury during the Week 12 loss to the Raiders that sidelined him for three weeks, Siemian started the next three games (Weeks 13–15), but suffered a partial dislocation of his non-throwing shoulder during the team's Week 15 win over the Indianapolis Colts that ended his season. Lynch started the regular season finale against the Kansas City Chiefs.

=== Standings ===
==== Division ====
AFC West
| | W | L | T | PCT | DIV | CONF | PF | PA | STK |
|---|---|---|---|---|---|---|---|---|---|
| ^{(4)} Kansas City Chiefs | 10 | 6 | 0 | .625 | 5–1 | 8–4 | 415 | 339 | W4 |
| Los Angeles Chargers | 9 | 7 | 0 | .563 | 3–3 | 6–6 | 355 | 272 | W2 |
| Oakland Raiders | 6 | 10 | 0 | .375 | 2–4 | 5–7 | 301 | 373 | L4 |
| Denver Broncos | 5 | 11 | 0 | .313 | 2–4 | 4–8 | 289 | 382 | L2 |

==== Conference ====
AFC
| # | Team | Division | W | L | T | PCT | DIV | CONF | SOS | SOV | STK |
|---|---|---|---|---|---|---|---|---|---|---|---|
**Division leaders**
| 1 (Note: New England claimed the No. 1 seed over Pittsburgh based on head-to-head victory.) | New England Patriots | East | 13 | 3 | 0 | .813 | 5–1 | 10–2 | .484 | .466 | W3 |
| 2 | Pittsburgh Steelers | North | 13 | 3 | 0 | .813 | 6–0 | 10–2 | .453 | .423 | W2 |
| 3 (Note: Jacksonville claimed the No. 3 seed over Kansas City based on conference record.) | Jacksonville Jaguars | South | 10 | 6 | 0 | .625 | 4–2 | 9–3 | .434 | .394 | L2 |
| 4 | Kansas City Chiefs | West | 10 | 6 | 0 | .625 | 5–1 | 8–4 | .477 | .481 | W4 |
**Wild Cards**
| 5 (Note: Tennessee finished ahead of Buffalo, Baltimore and Los Angeles Chargers based on conference record, claiming the No. 5 seed. Buffalo and Baltimore finished ahead of Los Angeles Chargers based on conference record. Buffalo claimed the No. 6 seed over Baltimore based on strength of victory.) | Tennessee Titans | South | 9 | 7 | 0 | .563 | 5–1 | 8–4 | .434 | .396 | W1 |
| 6 | Buffalo Bills | East | 9 | 7 | 0 | .563 | 3–3 | 7–5 | .492 | .396 | W1 |
**Did not qualify for the postseason**
| 7 | Baltimore Ravens | North | 9 | 7 | 0 | .563 | 3–3 | 7–5 | .441 | .299 | L1 |
| 8 | Los Angeles Chargers | West | 9 | 7 | 0 | .563 | 3–3 | 6–6 | .457 | .347 | W2 |
| 9 | Cincinnati Bengals | North | 7 | 9 | 0 | .438 | 3–3 | 6–6 | .465 | .321 | W2 |
| 10 (Note: Oakland finished ahead of Miami based on head-to-head victory.) | Oakland Raiders | West | 6 | 10 | 0 | .375 | 2–4 | 5–7 | .512 | .396 | L4 |
| 11 | Miami Dolphins | East | 6 | 10 | 0 | .375 | 2–4 | 5–7 | .543 | .531 | L3 |
| 12 (Note: Denver finished ahead of the New York Jets based on head-to-head victory.) | Denver Broncos | West | 5 | 11 | 0 | .313 | 2–4 | 4–8 | .492 | .413 | L2 |
| 13 | New York Jets | East | 5 | 11 | 0 | .313 | 2–4 | 5–7 | .520 | .438 | L4 |
| 14 (Note: Indianapolis finished ahead of Houston based on head-to-head sweep.) | Indianapolis Colts | South | 4 | 12 | 0 | .250 | 2–4 | 3–9 | .480 | .219 | W1 |
| 15 | Houston Texans | South | 4 | 12 | 0 | .250 | 1–5 | 3–9 | .516 | .375 | L6 |
| 16 | Cleveland Browns | North | 0 | 16 | 0 | .000 | 0–6 | 0–12 | .520 | – | L16 |
**Tiebreakers** (Note: When breaking ties for three or more teams under the NFL's rules, they are first broken within divisions, then comparing only the highest ranked remaining team from each division.)

=== Statistics ===
==== Team leaders ====
| Category | Player(s) | Value |
|---|---|---|
| Passing yards | Trevor Siemian | 2,285 |
| Passing touchdowns | Trevor Siemian | 12 |
| Rushing yards | C. J. Anderson | 1,007 |
| Rushing touchdowns | C. J. Anderson | 3 |
| Receptions | Demaryius Thomas | 83 |
| Receiving yards | Demaryius Thomas | 949 |
| Receiving touchdowns | Demaryius Thomas | 5 |
| Points | Brandon McManus | 99 |
| Kickoff return yards | Devontae Booker | 276 |
| Punt return yards | Isaiah McKenzie | 183 |
| Tackles | Brandon Marshall | 106 |
| Sacks | Von Miller | 10 |
| Forced fumbles | Shaquil Barrett; Von Miller | 2 |
| Interceptions | Darian Stewart | 3 |

Source for this section: Denver Broncos' official website.

==== League rankings ====
Offense
| Category | Value | NFL rank (out of 32) |
|---|---|---|
| Total yards | 324.1 YPG | T–17th |
| Yards per play | 4.8 | 28th |
| Rushing yards | 115.8 YPG | 12th |
| Yards per rush | 4.1 | 15th |
| Passing yards | 208.3 YPG | 20th |
| Yards per pass | 6.5 | 27th |
| Total touchdowns | 31 | 24th |
| Rushing touchdowns | 8 | T–25th |
| Receiving touchdowns | 19 | T–25th |
| Scoring | 18.1 PPG | 27th |
| Pass completions | 332/566 (.587) | 27th |
| Third downs | 94/241 (.390) | 15th |
| First downs per game | 18.6 | 20th |
| Possession average | 31:28 | 6th |
| Fewest sacks allowed | 52 | T–29th |
| Turnover differential | -17 | 31st |
| Fewest penalties | 113 | 23rd |
| Fewest penalty yardage | 885 | 11th |

Defense
| Category | Value | NFL rank (out of 32) |
|---|---|---|
| Total yards | 290 YPG | 3rd |
| Yards per play | 4.9 | 3rd |
| Rushing yards | 89.4 YPG | 5th |
| Yards per rush | 3.3 | 1st |
| Passing yards | 200.6 YPG | 4th |
| Yards per pass | 6.9 | 15th |
| Total touchdowns | 44 | T–24th |
| Rushing touchdowns | 9 | T–6th |
| Receiving touchdowns | 29 | 28th |
| Scoring | 23.9 PPG | T–22nd |
| Pass completions | 294/491 (.599) | 12th |
| Third downs | 66/209 (.316) | 2nd |
| First downs per game | 16.6 | 3rd |
| Sacks | 33 | 22nd |
| Forced fumbles | 8 | T–30th |
| Fumble recoveries | 7 | 19th |
| Interceptions | 10 | T–24th |
| Fewest penalties | 89 | 1st |
| Fewest penalty yardage | 821 | 4th |

Special Teams
| Category | Value | NFL rank (out of 32) |
|---|---|---|
| Kickoff returns | 22.6 YPR | 8th |
| Punt returns | 8.6 YPR | 15th |
| Gross punting | 44.2 YPP | 23rd |
| Net punting | 40 YPP | 22nd |
| Kickoff coverage | 22.6 YPR | 23rd |
| Punt coverage | 8.6 YPR | 21st |

Source for this section: NFL.com.

== Records and milestones ==
- Von Miller
  - Week 6: Achieved 80.5 career sacks, surpassing Karl Mecklenburg for second place on the Broncos' all-time list for career sacks, behind Simon Fletcher (97.5). During that same game, Miller (94 games) also became the second-fastest player in NFL history to reach 80 career sacks, behind only Reggie White (70 games).
  - Week 14: Became the first player in franchise history to record double-digit sacks in his first six seasons with the Broncos, and joined Reggie White and DeMarcus Ware as the only players to record double-digit sacks in six of their first seven seasons.
  - Pro Bowl: Became the fourth player in NFL history to win MVP awards for both a Super Bowl and a Pro Bowl, joining Peyton Manning, Jerry Rice and Phil Simms – Miller was voted as the MVP for Super Bowl 50.
- Aqib Talib: During the Broncos' Week 2 win over the Dallas Cowboys, Talib returned an interception 103 yards for a touchdown, which set a new record for the longest interception return in Broncos' franchise history, surpassing the record that Chris Harris, Jr. previously set in 2012. During that same game, Talib also surpassed Deion Sanders for fourth place on the NFL's all-time list for interception returns for touchdowns.
- Demaryius Thomas
  - Week 6: Reached 8,000 career receiving yards.
  - Week 12: Became the third player in Broncos' franchise history to record 600 receptions (Shannon Sharpe and Rod Smith are the other two), and the fastest to reach that feat, in his 112th game.
  - Week 14: Surpassed Shannon Sharpe for second on the Broncos all-time franchise lists for touchdowns and receiving yards.

== Awards and honors ==
| Recipient | awards |
|---|---|
| C. J. Anderson | Week 2: FedEx Ground Player of the Week |
| Garett Bolles | 2017 season: Named to the Pro Football Writers of America's All-Rookie team |
| Von Miller | 2017 season: Named to the Pro Football Writers of America's All-NFL and All-AFC teams Pro Bowl: Defensive Most Valuable Player |
| Trevor Siemian | Week 2: FedEx Air Player of the Week |

=== Pro Bowl and All-Pro selections ===
Linebacker Von Miller and cornerback Aqib Talib were selected to the 2018 Pro Bowl, while cornerback Chris Harris, Jr. and nose tackle Domata Peko were named as alternates. Miller was also voted to the 2017 All-Pro Team and named to the Second Team.

== Other news and notes ==
On July 24, John Elway, the team's executive vice president/general manager since 2011, received a five-year contract extension from the Broncos that will run through the 2021 season. In addition, Elway was promoted from executive vice president to president of football operations.
