= Jerrol =

Jerrol is a given name. Notable people with the name include:

- Jerrol Wayne Littles or J. Wayne Littles (born 1939), American director of Marshall Space Flight Center
- Jerrol Garcia-Williams (born 1993), American football player
- Jerrol Williams (1967–2025), American football player
