= Jamal Carter =

American football player (born 1994)

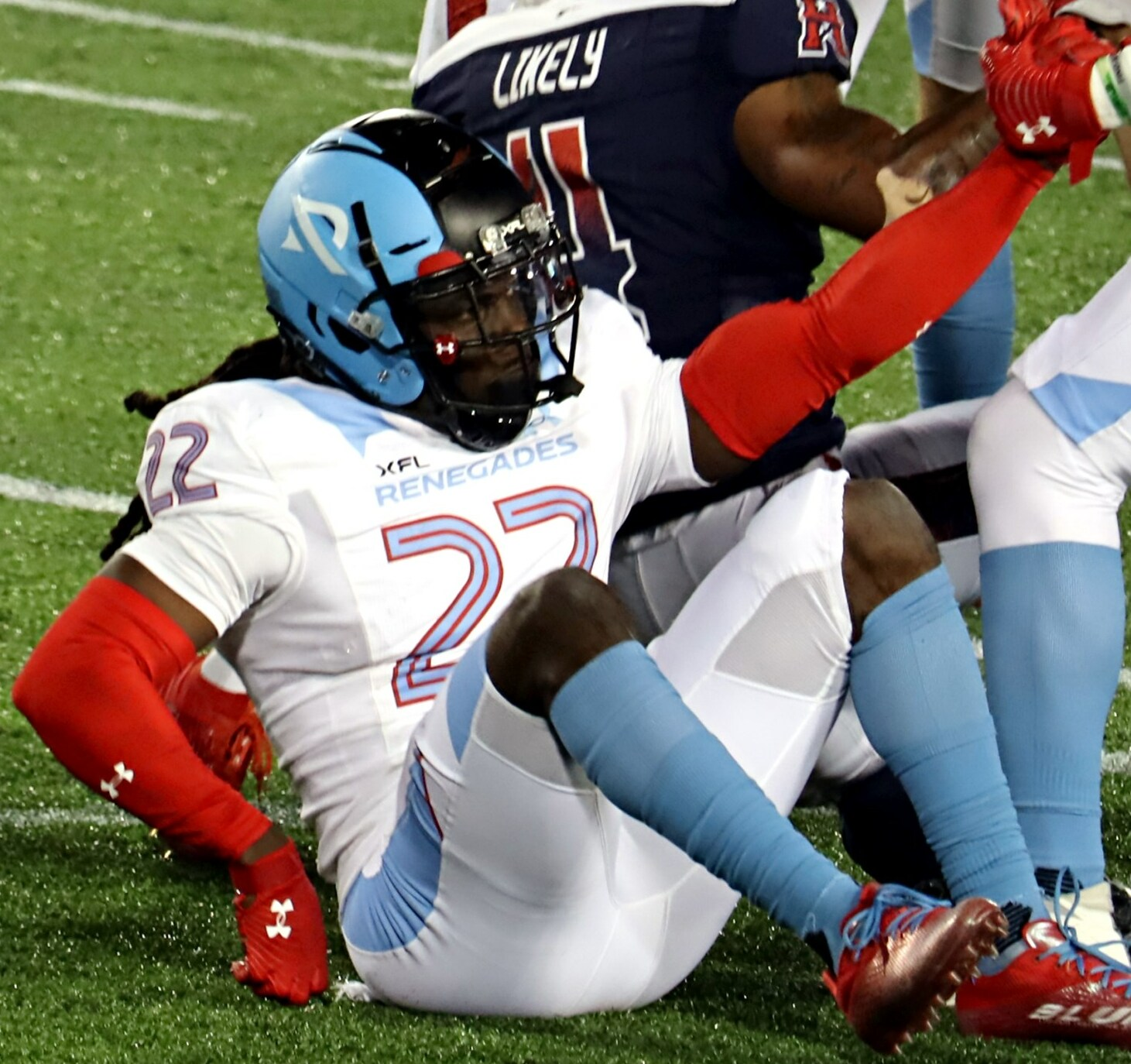
- Carter with the Arlington Renegades in 2023

No. 22
- Position: Safety

Personal information
- Born: April 12, 1994 (age 32); Naranja, Florida, U.S.
- Listed height: 6 ft 1 in (1.85 m)
- Listed weight: 215 lb (98 kg)

Career information
- High school: Miami Southridge (Miami, Florida)
- College: Miami (FL)
- NFL draft: 2017: undrafted

Career history
- Denver Broncos (2017–2018); Atlanta Falcons (2019–2020); Arizona Cardinals (2021)*; Tennessee Titans (2021); Arlington Renegades (2023–2025)
- * Offseason or practice squad member only

Awards and highlights
- XFL champion (2023)

Career NFL statistics
- Total tackles: 11
- Pass deflections: 1
- Stats at Pro Football Reference

Jamal Carter (born April 12, 1994) is an American professional football safety. He played college football at the University of Miami.

== Early life ==
Carter played high school football at Miami Southridge High School in Miami, Florida. He recorded 73 tackles and 1 interception his senior year in 2012.

== College career ==
Carter played for the Miami Hurricanes of the University of Miami from 2013 to 2016. Carter played in 50 games (15 starts) at the University of Miami, totaling 165 tackles (96 solo), two interceptions and 10 passes defensed. He opened 12-of-13 games played as a senior, leading the team with 85 tackles (53 solo) in addition to posting three passes defensed. Carter appeared in 12 games (1 start) as a junior, recording 49 tackles (23 solo), one interception, three passes defensed and one forced fumble. He played 13 games (2 starts) as a sophomore and finished with 26 tackles (15 solo), one interception and six passes defensed.

== Professional career ==
=== Pre-draft ===
Carter was rated the 22nd best strong safety in the 2017 NFL draft by NFLDraftScout.com. Lance Zierlein of NFL.com predicted that he would go undrafted and be a priority free agent, stating "Carter is a classic height, weight, speed player who is more project than prospect at this point".

Pre-draft measurables
Height	Weight	Arm length	Hand span	40-yard dash	10-yard split	20-yard split	20-yard shuttle	Three-cone drill	Vertical jump	Broad jump	Bench press
6 ft 0 7/8 in (1.85 m)	218 lb (99 kg)	31 in (0.79 m)	9 3/8 in (0.24 m)	4.64 s	1.61 s	2.71 s	4.35 s	7.17 s	35 in (0.89 m)	10 ft 2 in (3.10 m)	19 reps
20‑ss and 3‑cone from Miami Pro Day, all others from NFL Combine

=== Denver Broncos ===
==== 2017 season ====
On May 11, 2017, the Denver Broncos signed Carter as an undrafted free agent to a three-year, $1.67 million contract that includes $20,000 guaranteed and a signing bonus of $10,000. The $20,000 guaranteed the Broncos' agreed to pay Carter was the most guaranteed money the Broncos gave to their undrafted free agent signings in 2017.

Throughout training camp, Carter competed for a roster spot against Orion Stewart, Dymonte Thomas, and Dante Barnett, who were also safeties signed as undrafted free agents, for a roster spot. He was expected to land on the practice squad with the four spots on the active roster dedicated to safeties already filled. Starting strong safety T. J. Ward missed part of training camp and the entire preseason after tearing his hamstring and was subsequently released. Carter led the Broncos with 19 combined tackles in the preseason and head coach Vance Joseph named him the backup strong safety behind Justin Simmons to start the regular season. Carter became the 13th undrafted Bronco in 14 seasons to make the first 53-man roster.

He made his professional regular season debut during the Broncos' season-opening 24-21 victory over the Los Angeles Chargers. In Week 3, Carter recorded his first career tackles during a 26-16 loss at the Buffalo Bills. He made the first tackle of his career on wide receiver Brandon Tate who returned a kick 23-yards in the third quarter. Carter received increased snaps on defense beginning in Week 15 after starting strong safety Justin Simmons was placed on injured reserve with a high ankle sprain. On December 14, 2017, Carter recorded a season-high three solo tackles in the Broncos' 25-13 victory at the Indianapolis Colts. He finished his rookie season with 11 combined tackles (nine solo) and one pass deflection in 16 games and zero starts.

==== 2018 season ====
On August 13, 2018, Carter was placed on injured reserve after suffering a torn hamstring.

==== 2019 season ====
On August 31, 2019, Carter was waived by the Broncos.

=== Atlanta Falcons ===
On September 2, 2019, Carter was signed to the Atlanta Falcons practice squad. He was promoted to the active roster on September 24, 2019.

Carter was placed on the reserve/COVID-19 list by the Falcons on July 29, 2020. He was activated on August 18, 2020. He was waived on September 5, 2020, and was signed to the Falcons' practice squad the next day. He was elevated to the active roster on October 5 for the team's week 4 game against the Green Bay Packers, and reverted to the practice squad after the game. He was released on October 7, 2020.

=== Arizona Cardinals ===
On January 20, 2021, Carter signed a reserve/futures contract with the Arizona Cardinals. He was waived on August 10, 2021.

=== Tennessee Titans ===
On August 17, 2021, Carter signed with the Tennessee Titans. He was waived on August 31, 2021 and re-signed to the practice squad. After the Titans were eliminated in the Divisional Round of the 2021 playoffs, he signed a reserve/future contract on January 24, 2022. He was waived/injured on May 16, 2022 and placed on injured reserve. He was released from injured reserve on June 12, 2022.

=== Arlington Renegades ===
The Arlington Renegades selected Carter in the second round of the 2023 XFL Supplemental Draft on January 1, 2023. He was placed on the reserve list by the team on March 4, 2023, and activated on April 21. He re-signed with the team on January 26, 2024, and March 11. He re-signed with the team again on September 27, 2024.
