= Brendan Langley =

American football player (born 1994)

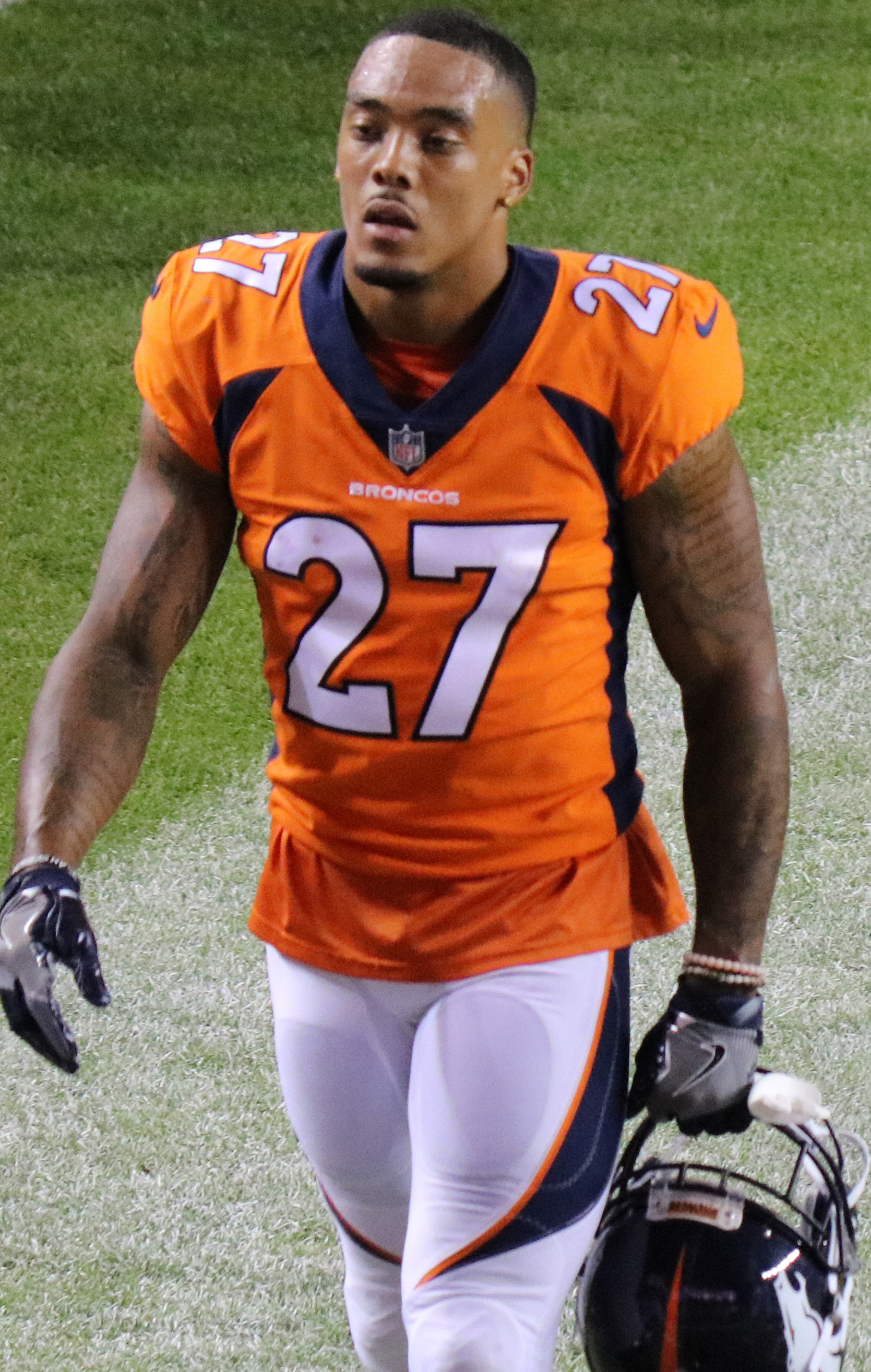
- Langley with the Denver Broncos in 2017

No. 27
- Positions: Wide receiver, cornerback

Personal information
- Born: October 16, 1994 (age 32); Marietta, Georgia, U.S.
- Listed height: 6 ft 1 in (1.85 m)
- Listed weight: 179 lb (81 kg)

Career information
- High school: Carlton J. Kell (Marietta)
- College: Georgia (2013–2014); Lamar (2015–2016)
- NFL draft: 2017: 3rd round, 101st overall pick

Career history
- Denver Broncos (2017–2018); Seattle Seahawks (2019)*; Calgary Stampeders (2022)
- * Offseason or practice squad member only

Career NFL statistics
- Total tackles: 6
- Return yards: 250
- Stats at Pro Football Reference

Brendan Langley (born October 16, 1994) is an American former professional football player who was a wide receiver in the National Football League (NFL). He played college football for the Georgia Bulldogs from 2013 to 2014, then transferred to Lamar. He was selected in the third round of the 2017 NFL draft by the Denver Broncos as a cornerback.

== Professional career ==
=== Pre-draft ===
On December 8, 2016, it was announced that Langley accepted his invitation to play in the 2017 Senior Bowl. Throughout the week leading up to the Senior Bowl, Langley was impressive in practice and showed fluid movement and an ability to break quickly to the ball, but was unable to hang on to receptions during receiving drills. On January 27, 2017, Langley appeared in the 2017 Reese's Senior Bowl as part of Chicago Bears head coach John Fox's North team. Langley recorded three combined tackles and intercepted Tulane quarterback Antonio Pipkin as the North lost 16–15 to the South. Langley was one of 60 collegiate defensive backs to attend the NFL Scouting Combine in Indianapolis, Indiana. He completed all of the combine drills and finished first among all defensive backs in the bench press and tenth in the 40-yard dash. On March 23, 2017, Langley attended Lamar's pro day, but opted to stand on his combine numbers and only performed positional and coverage skills for team representatives and scouts from ten NFL teams. During the draft process, he had private visits and workouts with multiple teams, including the New England Patriots, Denver Broncos, New York Jets, Arizona Cardinals, Minnesota Vikings, and the Oakland Raiders. At the conclusion of the pre-draft process, Langley was projected to be a fourth to sixth round pick by NFL draft experts and analysts. Langley was ranked as the 24th best cornerback prospect in the draft by NFLDraftScout.com.

Pre-draft measurables
Height	Weight	Arm length	Hand span	40-yard dash	10-yard split	20-yard split	20-yard shuttle	Three-cone drill	Vertical jump	Broad jump	Bench press
6 ft 0 3/8 in (1.84 m)	199 lb (90 kg)	32 in (0.81 m)	9 1/2 in (0.24 m)	4.43 s	1.57 s	2.61 s	4.21 s	7.06 s	35 1/2 in (0.90 m)	10 ft 3 in (3.12 m)	22 reps
All values from NFL Combine

=== Denver Broncos ===
The Broncos selected Langley in the third round with the 101st overall pick of the 2017 NFL draft. Langley was the 18th cornerback selected in 2017. He was the highest draft pick from Lamar since Tom Smiley in 1968, and was the first player drafted from Lamar in over 25 years (Tyrone Shavers, 1990 NFL draft). He was also only the 19th player selected from Lamar and the fourth highest draft pick in school history. On May 11, 2017, the Broncos signed Langley to a four-year, $3.17 million contract that includes a signing bonus of $706,288.

Throughout training camp, Langley competed for the job as the fourth cornerback on the depth chart against Taurean Nixon and Lorenzo Doss. Head coach Vance Joseph named Langley the fourth cornerback on depth chart and for the Broncos' dime packages.

He made his professional regular season debut during the Broncos' season-opening 24–21 victory over the Los Angeles Chargers. On November 26, 2017, Langely recorded his first two career tackles in a 21–14 loss at the Raiders. Langley was inactive for three games (Weeks 14–16) after he was surpassed on the depth chart by rookie undrafted free agent Marcus Rios. He finished his rookie season in 2017 season with three solo tackles in 11 games and zero starts, while playing mostly on special teams.

On September 1, 2018, Langley was waived by the Broncos and was signed to the practice squad the next day. He was promoted to the active roster on November 20, 2018.

On March 18, 2019, it was announced that Langley would be converting from cornerback to wide receiver. He was waived on August 31, 2019.

Langley was selected in the 7th round during phase four in the 2020 XFL draft as a cornerback by the Houston Roughnecks.

=== Seattle Seahawks ===
On January 1, 2020, Langley was signed to the Seattle Seahawks practice squad. His practice squad contract with the team expired on January 20, 2020.

=== Calgary Stampeders ===
On February 28, 2022, Langley was signed by the Calgary Stampeders of the Canadian Football League. On May 14, Langley was placed on the team's suspended list as he was dealing with travel issues. He was indefinitely suspended by the Stampeders on May 26, following an incident at Newark Liberty International Airport. On May 8, 2023, the Stampeders announced they had moved Langley to the retired list.

== Legal troubles ==
On May 23, 2022, a video emerged of Langley involved in a fight with a United Express employee at Newark Liberty International Airport who was later fired. The incident was said to occur after Langley was confronted over using a wheelchair to carry his luggage. Langley was later arrested and faced an assault charge. The Calgary Stampeders suspended Langley indefinitely, following his arrest. The charges were later dropped after security footage showed that the United employee was the aggressor and instigated the physical altercation.
