= Zaire Anderson =

American football player (born 1992)

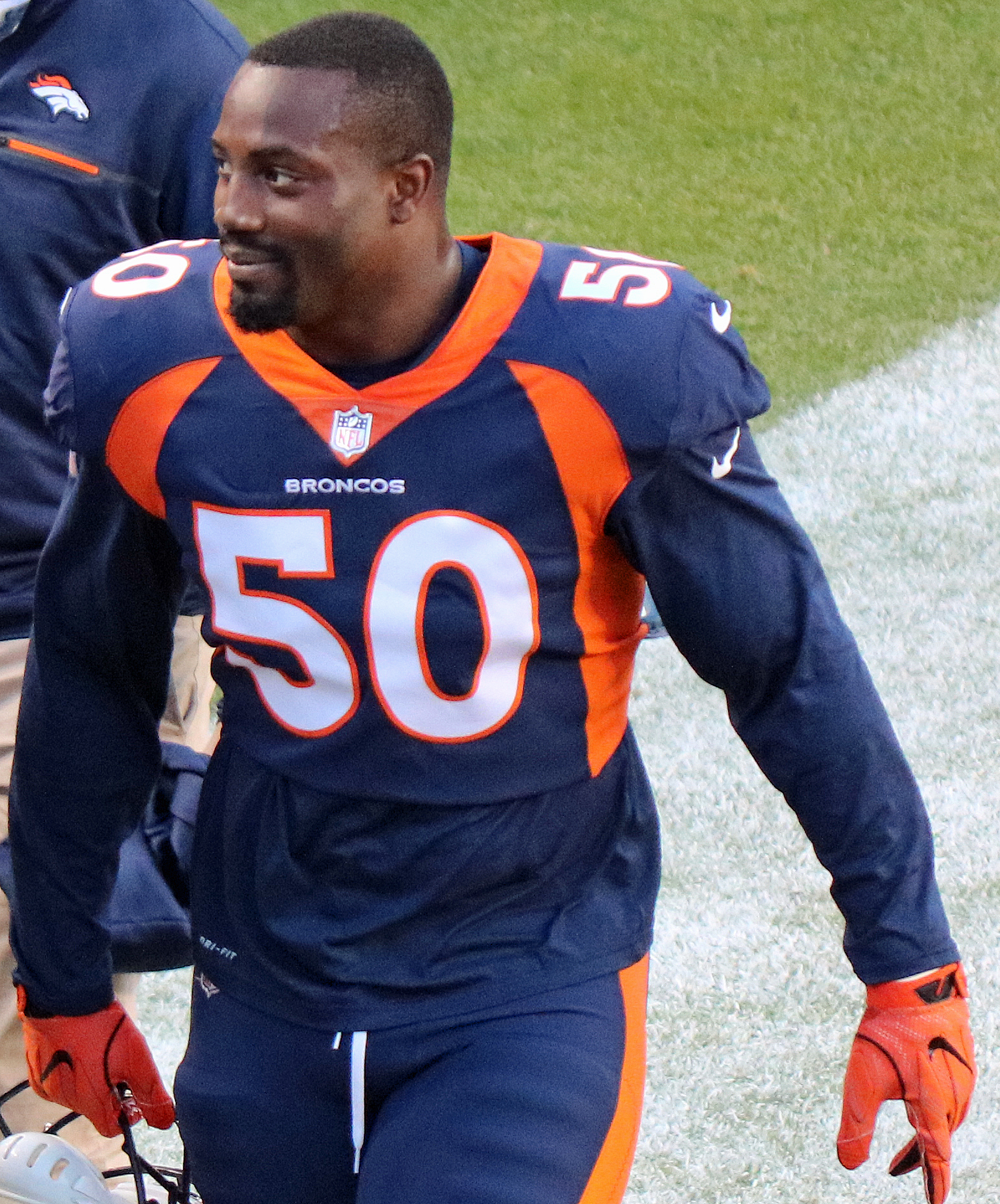
- Anderson with the Denver Broncos in 2017

No. 47, 50
- Position: Linebacker

Personal information
- Born: August 18, 1992 (age 34); Philadelphia, Pennsylvania, U.S.
- Listed height: 5 ft 11 in (1.80 m)
- Listed weight: 220 lb (100 kg)

Career information
- High school: Frankford (Philadelphia)
- College: Nebraska
- NFL draft: 2015: undrafted

Career history
- Denver Broncos (2015–2017)

Awards and highlights
- Super Bowl champion (50)

Career NFL statistics
- Total tackles: 37
- Forced fumbles: 2
- Fumble recoveries: 1
- Stats at Pro Football Reference

Zaire Anderson (born August 18, 1992) is an American former professional football player who was a linebacker in the National Football League (NFL) for three seasons. He played college football for the Nebraska Cornhuskers and was signed by the Denver Broncos as an undrafted free agent in 2015.

== College career ==
Anderson started 18 of 28 games in three seasons at Nebraska after beginning his college career at Riverside City College. He registered 159 tackles (77 solo), five sacks, six passes defensed, three forced fumbles and two fumble recoveries. He led the Cornhuskers with 103 tackles in addition to recording two sacks, five passes defensed, three forced fumbles and two fumble recoveries as a senior, earning honorable-mention All-Big Ten Conference honors. Anderson played 12 games (5 starts) as a junior, finishing the season with 52 tackles (28 solo), three sacks, and one pass defensed. He recorded 95 tackles, 6.5 sacks and two passes defensed in 2011 at Riverside City College. Anderson was named a JC Gridwire All-American and the National Division East Conference Defensive Player of the Year in 2010 after finishing the season with 92 tackles, 17 tackles for a loss and nine sacks.

== Professional career ==
=== 2015 season ===
Anderson was signed by the Broncos as an undrafted free agent on May 2, 2015. He was waived on September 5, 2015, and was signed to the Broncos' practice squad on September 7, where he spent his entire rookie season. On February 7, 2016, Anderson was part of the Broncos team that won Super Bowl 50. In the game, the Broncos defeated the Carolina Panthers by a score of 24–10. After the season, Anderson was signed by Denver to a future contract on February 10, 2016.

=== 2016 season ===
Anderson made his NFL debut vs. the Carolina Panthers in a Super Bowl 50 rematch on September 8, 2016. He played in all 16 games (1 start), totaling seven tackles (4 solo) on defense to go along with seven tackles and one forced fumble on special teams. He made his first career start vs. the Oakland Raiders on January 1, 2017.

=== 2017 season ===
In 2017, Anderson recorded 20 tackles (15 solo) and three special-teams stops in 16 games (2 starts). In Week 17 of the 2017 season, Anderson recovered a fumble by Chiefs' fullback Anthony Sherman and returned it 38 yards for the touchdown.

=== 2018 season ===
On September 1, 2018, Anderson was waived by the Broncos.

== Personal life ==
Anderson played prep ball at Frankford High School in Philadelphia, where he was named a first-team All-Philadelphia Public selection his senior season. Anderson earned his degree in child, youth and family sciences in 2014 and played his senior season as a graduate student at Nebraska.
