= Jerrol Williams =

American football player (1967–2025)

No. 91, 57, 95
- Position: Linebacker

Personal information
- Born: July 5, 1967; Las Vegas, Nevada, U.S.
- Died: November 7, 2025 (aged 58)
- Listed height: 6 ft 5 in (1.96 m)
- Listed weight: 245 lb (111 kg)

Career information
- High school: Chaparral (Las Vegas)
- College: Purdue
- NFL draft: 1989: 4th round, 91st overall pick

Career history
- Pittsburgh Steelers (1989–1992); San Diego Chargers (1993); Kansas City Chiefs (1994); Green Bay Packers (1995)*; Baltimore Ravens (1996)
- * Offseason or practice squad member only

Awards and highlights
- Second-team All-Big Ten (1988)

Career NFL statistics
- Tackles: 239
- Sacks: 21
- Interceptions: 1
- Stats at Pro Football Reference

Jerrol Lynn Williams (July 5, 1967 – November 7, 2025) was an American professional football player who was a linebacker in the National Football League (NFL). He was selected by the Pittsburgh Steelers in the fourth round of the 1989 NFL draft. He played college football for the Purdue Boilermakers.

Williams also played for the San Diego Chargers, Kansas City Chiefs, and Baltimore Ravens.

His son, Jerrol Garcia-Williams, played college football at Hawaii and played two seasons with the Denver Broncos.

Williams was diagnosed with pancreatic cancer in November 2024. He died from the disease on November 7, 2025, at the age of 58.
