= J. J. Dielman =

American football player (born 1993)

No. 70, 64
- Position: Guard

Personal information
- Born: December 16, 1993 (age 32); Ahwatukee, Arizona, U.S.
- Listed height: 6 ft 5 in (1.96 m)
- Listed weight: 309 lb (140 kg)

Career information
- High school: Desert Vista (Phoenix, Arizona)
- College: Utah
- NFL draft: 2017: 5th round, 176th overall pick

Career history

Playing
- Cincinnati Bengals (2017)*; Los Angeles Rams (2017); Cincinnati Bengals (2017)*; Denver Broncos (2017–2018); Seattle Seahawks (2018)*; Los Angeles Rams (2018)*; New England Patriots (2019)*
- * Offseason or practice squad member only

Coaching
- Utah (2020) Graduate assistant

Awards and highlights
- Second-team All-Pac-12 (2015)
- Stats at Pro Football Reference

Jeffery Joseph Dielman (born December 16, 1993) is an American former professional football guard. He played college football at Utah, and was selected by the Cincinnati Bengals in the fifth round of the 2017 NFL draft.

== Early life ==
Dielman played for Desert Vista High School in Arizona, and was named First-team all-state, as well as all-section III South and all-city. Desert Vista High was the 2011 Arizona D1 state champion. He was a team captain for his high school football team.

== College career ==
Dielman played college football for the Utah Utes, where he was a three-year starter on the offensive line, starting in 31 consecutive games. He played right tackle his first three seasons (26 games) before moving to the center position as a senior (5 games). He started 13 games as a junior at right tackle, earning second-team All-Pac-12 Conference honors. Dielman started all 13 games as a sophomore at right tackle.

== Professional career ==
=== Cincinnati Bengals (first stint) ===
Dielman was drafted by the Cincinnati Bengals in the fifth round, 176th overall, in the 2017 NFL draft. He was waived on September 2, 2017.

=== Los Angeles Rams (first stint) ===
On September 3, 2017, Dielman was claimed off waivers by the Los Angeles Rams. He was waived on September 12, 2017.

=== Cincinnati Bengals (second stint) ===
On September 14, 2017, Dielman was re-signed to the Bengals practice squad.

=== Denver Broncos ===
On December 16, 2017, Dielman was signed by the Denver Broncos off the Bengals' practice squad, following several injuries to the Broncos' offensive line.

On September 1, 2018, Dielman was waived/injured by the Broncos and was placed on injured reserve. He was released on September 11, 2018.

=== Seattle Seahawks ===
On October 23, 2018, Dielman was signed to the Seattle Seahawks practice squad, but was released a week later.

=== Los Angeles Rams (second stint) ===
On November 7, 2018, Dielman was signed to the Rams practice squad.

=== New England Patriots ===
On July 26, 2019, Dielman signed with the New England Patriots. However three days later, Dielman announced his retirement from the NFL.

== Personal life ==
Dielman is cousins with former guard Kris Dielman.
