= Taurean Nixon =

American football player (born 1991)

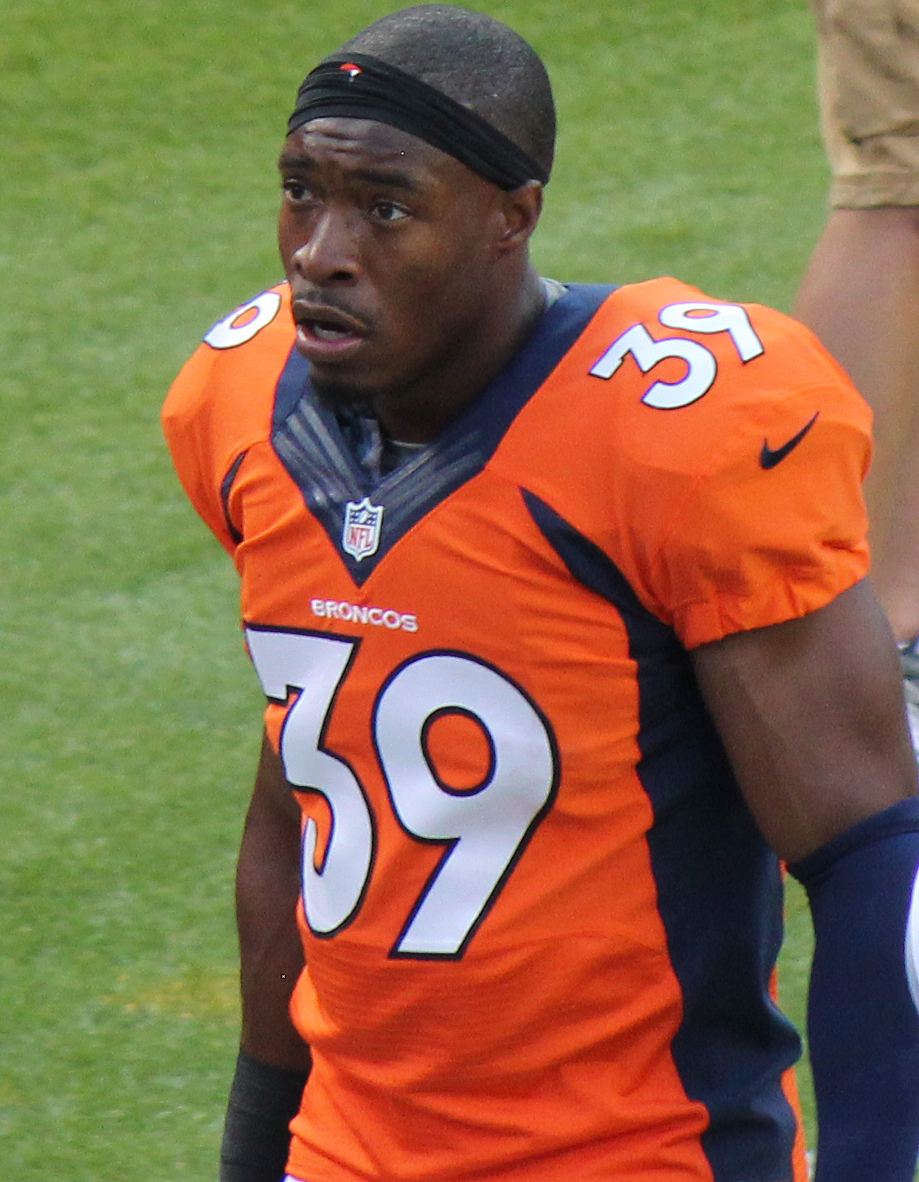
- Nixon with the Denver Broncos in 2015

No. 39, 43, 31
- Position: Cornerback

Personal information
- Born: February 7, 1991 (age 35); Baton Rouge, Louisiana, U.S.
- Listed height: 5 ft 10 in (1.78 m)
- Listed weight: 187 lb (85 kg)

Career information
- High school: Southern University Laboratory School (Baton Rouge)
- College: Tulane
- NFL draft: 2015: 7th round, 251st overall pick

Career history
- Denver Broncos (2015–2016); Jacksonville Jaguars (2017)*; Kansas City Chiefs (2017)*; Indianapolis Colts (2017)*; Los Angeles Rams (2017–2018)*
- * Offseason or practice squad member only

Awards and highlights
- Super Bowl champion (50)

Career NFL statistics
- Total tackles: 1
- Stats at Pro Football Reference

Taurean Ellis Nixon (born February 7, 1991) is an American former professional football player who was a cornerback in the National Football League (NFL). He was selected by the Denver Broncos in the seventh round of 2015 NFL draft. He played college football for the Tulane Green Wave.

== College career ==
Nixon attended and played college football at Tulane University.

== Professional career ==
=== Denver Broncos ===
The Denver Broncos selected Nixon in the seventh round with the 251st overall pick of the 2015 NFL draft. On May 15, 2015, Nixon signed a four-year contract. On September 6, 2015, Nixon was signed to the practice squad. On January 19, 2016, Nixon was promoted to the active roster. On February 7, 2016, Nixon was part of the Broncos team that won Super Bowl 50. In the game, the Broncos defeated the Carolina Panthers by a score of 24–10. Nixon was inactive for the game.

On September 3, 2016, Nixon was waived by the Broncos and was signed to their practice squad the next day. He was promoted to the active roster on November 5, 2016. He was waived by the Broncos on November 21, 2016, and was re-signed to the practice squad. He was promoted back to the active roster on December 28, 2016.

On June 14, 2017, Nixon was waived by the Broncos.

=== Jacksonville Jaguars ===
On June 15, 2017, Nixon was claimed off waivers by the Jacksonville Jaguars. He was waived/injured by the Jaguars on July 31, 2017, and was placed on injured reserve. He was waived on August 8, 2017.

=== Kansas City Chiefs ===
On September 6, 2017, Nixon was signed to the Kansas City Chiefs' practice squad. He was released on September 19, 2017.

=== Indianapolis Colts ===
On December 4, 2017, Nixon was signed to the Indianapolis Colts' practice squad. He was released on December 11, 2017.

=== Los Angeles Rams ===
On December 27, 2017, Nixon was signed to the Los Angeles Rams' practice squad. He signed a reserve/future contract with the Rams on January 8, 2018. He was waived on August 31, 2018.
