= Marcus Rios =

American football player (born 1994)

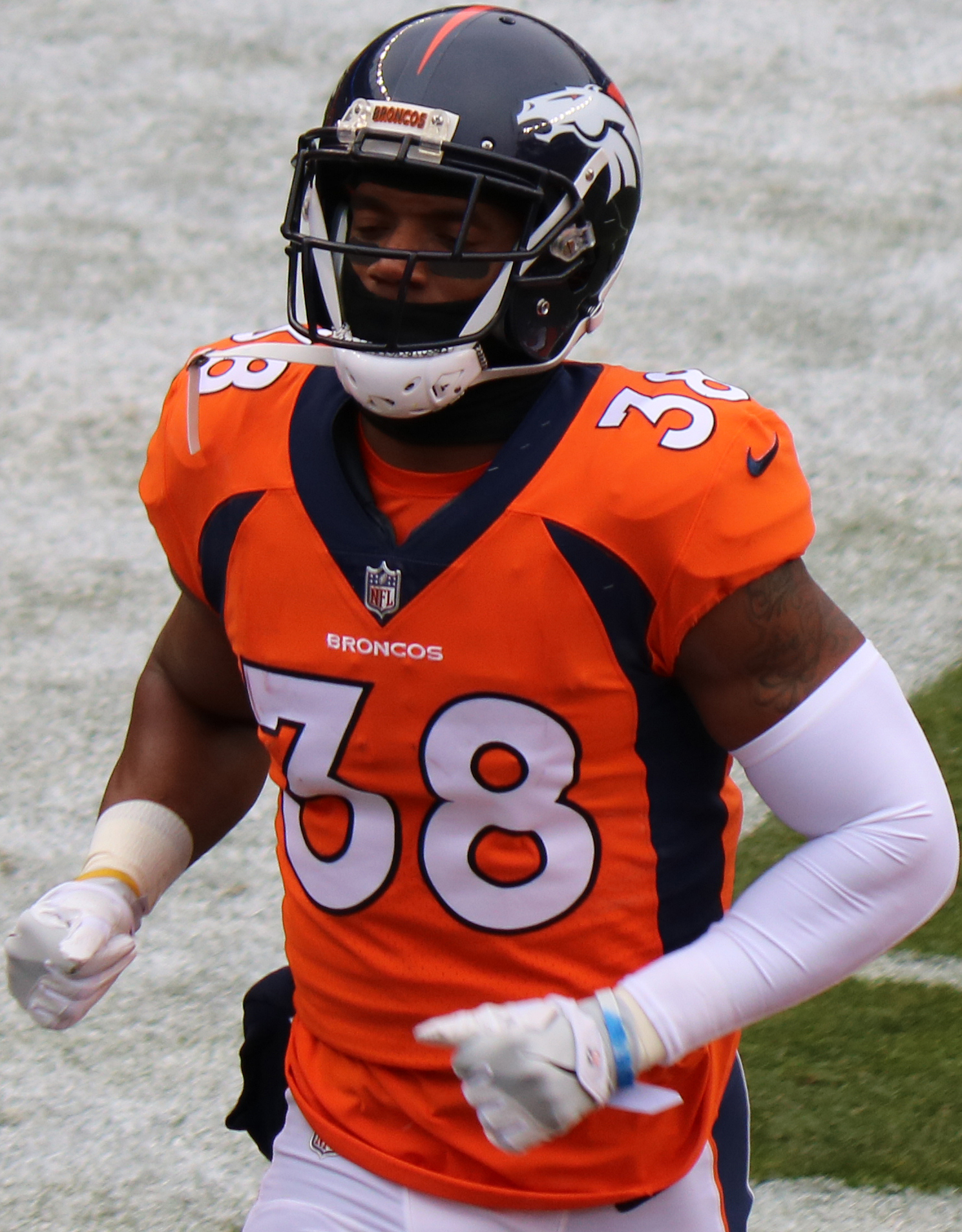
- Rios with the Denver Broncos in 2017

No. 38
- Position: Cornerback

Personal information
- Born: October 25, 1994 (age 32); Sacramento, California, U.S.
- Listed height: 6 ft 0 in (1.83 m)
- Listed weight: 209 lb (95 kg)

Career information
- High school: Cosumnes Oaks (Sacramento)
- College: UCLA
- NFL draft: 2017: undrafted

Career history
- Denver Broncos (2017–2018); Winnipeg Blue Bombers (2019)

Awards and highlights
- Grey Cup champion (2019)

Career NFL statistics
- Total tackles: 5
- Pass deflections: 1
- Stats at Pro Football Reference

Marcus Rios (born October 25, 1994) is an American former professional football player who was a cornerback in the National Football League (NFL) and Canadian Football League (CFL). He played college football for the UCLA Bruins.

== Professional career ==
Pre-draft measurables
| Height | Weight | 40-yard dash | 10-yard split | 20-yard split | 20-yard shuttle | Three-cone drill | Vertical jump | Broad jump | Bench press |
|---|---|---|---|---|---|---|---|---|---|
| 5 ft 11 in (1.80 m) | 192 lb (87 kg) | 4.45 s | 1.63 s | 2.62 s | 4.22 s | 7.25 s | 30 in (0.76 m) | 10 ft 4 in (3.15 m) | 19 reps |
All values from UCLA's Pro Day

On May 11, 2017, the Denver Broncos signed Rios as an undrafted free agent after he was not selected during the 2017 NFL draft. On April 30, the Denver Broncos signed Rios to a three-year, $1.66 million contract. On September 2, the Broncos waived Rios as part of their final roster cuts and he was signed to the practice squad the next day. He was promoted to the active roster on December 1.

On September 1, 2018, Rios was placed on injured reserve.

== Personal life ==
In 2013, Rios was diagnosed with an extremely rare condition known as Aspergillosis. Aspergillosis is defined as an infection caused by fungi of the genus Aspergillus. Though rare, the condition has proved to be fatal nearly every time it has been diagnosed; of the 12 people who had received similar diagnoses, eight of those had died. While in the hospital, Rios requested a room at the Ronald Reagan UCLA Medical Center with a window to oversee his team practice at the UCLA Wasserman Football Center. During his time in the hospital, Rios lost 50 pounds; however, he would recover and return to play for UCLA in 29 games. Rios' near-death experience has been retold on the Pac-12 Network's show "The Drive" and Animal Planet's "Monsters Inside Me" (The Killer in the Lake, season 5 episode 4). Although Rios did not receive an invite to the scouting combine, NFL Draft Scout shows that he posted a 4.45 40-yard dash and put up 18 bench press reps at his pro day, eventually earning a spot in the NFL with the Denver Broncos in 2017.
