= Jerrol Garcia-Williams =

American football player (born 1993)

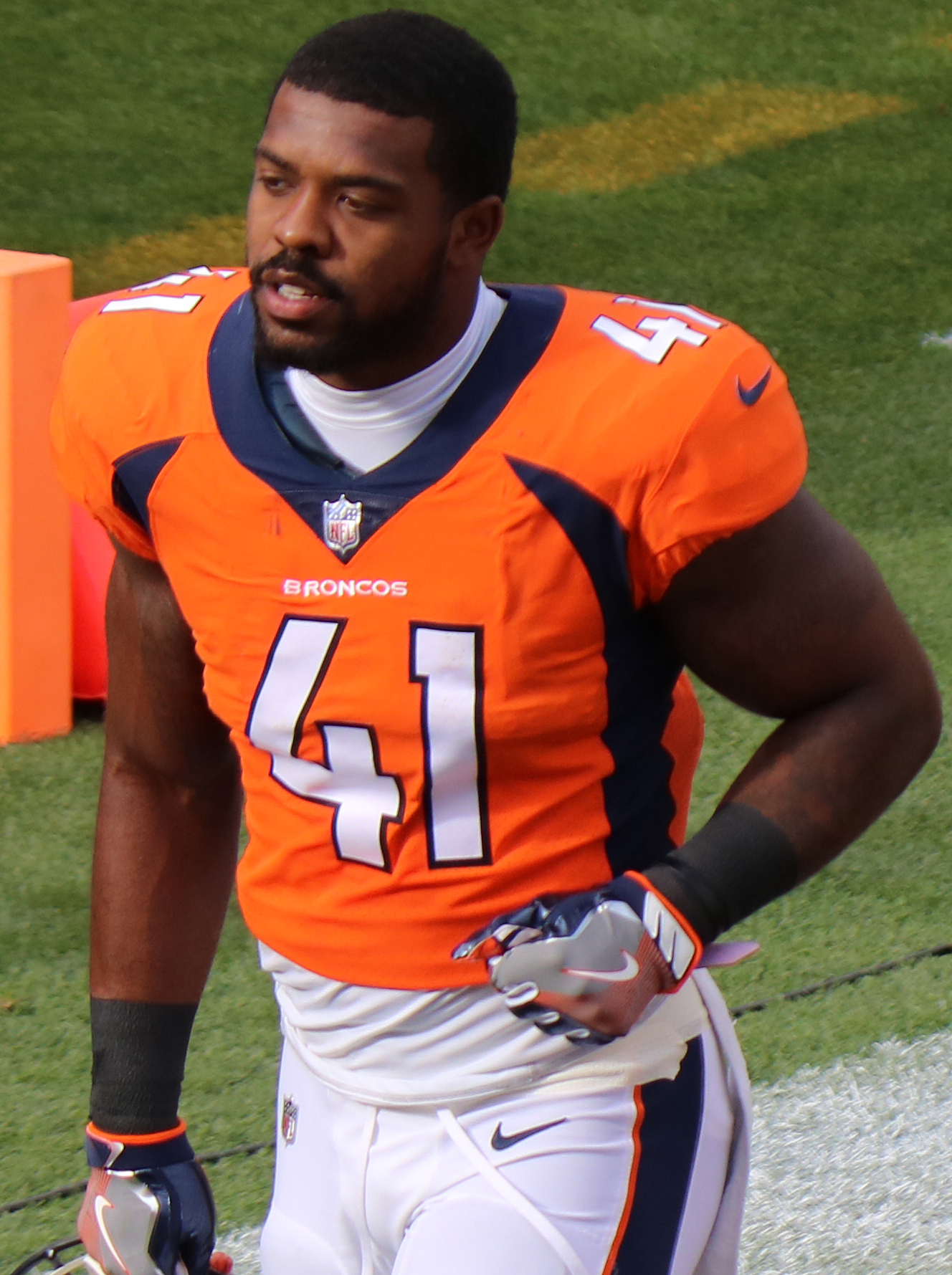
- Garcia-Williams with the Broncos in 2017

No. 41, 52
- Position: Linebacker

Personal information
- Born: December 24, 1993 (age 32); Wooster, Ohio, U.S.
- Listed height: 6 ft 2 in (1.88 m)
- Listed weight: 235 lb (107 kg)

Career information
- High school: Palo Verde (Las Vegas, Nevada)
- College: Hawaii
- NFL draft: 2017: undrafted

Career history
- Denver Broncos (2017–2018)

Career NFL statistics
- Total tackles: 2
- Stats at Pro Football Reference

Jerrol Garcia-Williams (born December 24, 1993) is an American former professional football player who was a linebacker in the National Football League (NFL). He played college football for the Hawaii Rainbow Warriors.

== Early life ==
Garcia-Williams attended Palo Verde High School in Las Vegas, finishing with 84 tackles, seven sacks, two interceptions and two forced fumbles as a senior.

== College career ==
Garcia-Williams appeared in 45 games (26 starts) at the University of Hawaii, totaling 222 tackles (148 solo), 3.5 sacks, one pass defensed and three fumble recoveries. He saw action in 10 games (3 starts) as a redshirt senior, posting 31 tackles (24 solo). He started 9-of-10 games played as a junior, finishing second on the team with 89 tackles (55 solo) in addition to recording 1.5 sacks. Garcia-Williams started the first two games of the season in 2014 before suffering a season-ending knee injury and earning a medical redshirt.

== Professional career ==
Garcia-Williams signed with the Denver Broncos as an undrafted free agent on May 11, 2017. He was waived by the Broncos on September 2, 2017, and was signed to the practice squad the next day. He was promoted to the active roster on October 21, 2017. He appeared in 11 games, posting one solo tackle and one special-teams stop.

On March 13, 2018, Garcia-Williams was tendered by the Broncos. On April 23, he signed the exclusive rights tender. On August 28, 2018, he suffered a torn ACL on the practice field and was ruled out for the season. He was placed on injured reserve on September 1, 2018. On March 7, 2019, The Broncos decided not tender linebacker Jerrol Garcia-Williams.

== Personal ==
His father, Jerrol Williams, was an NFL linebacker with Pittsburgh (1989–92), San Diego (1993), Kansas City (1994) and Baltimore (1996).
