= Dymonte Thomas =

American football player (born 1993)

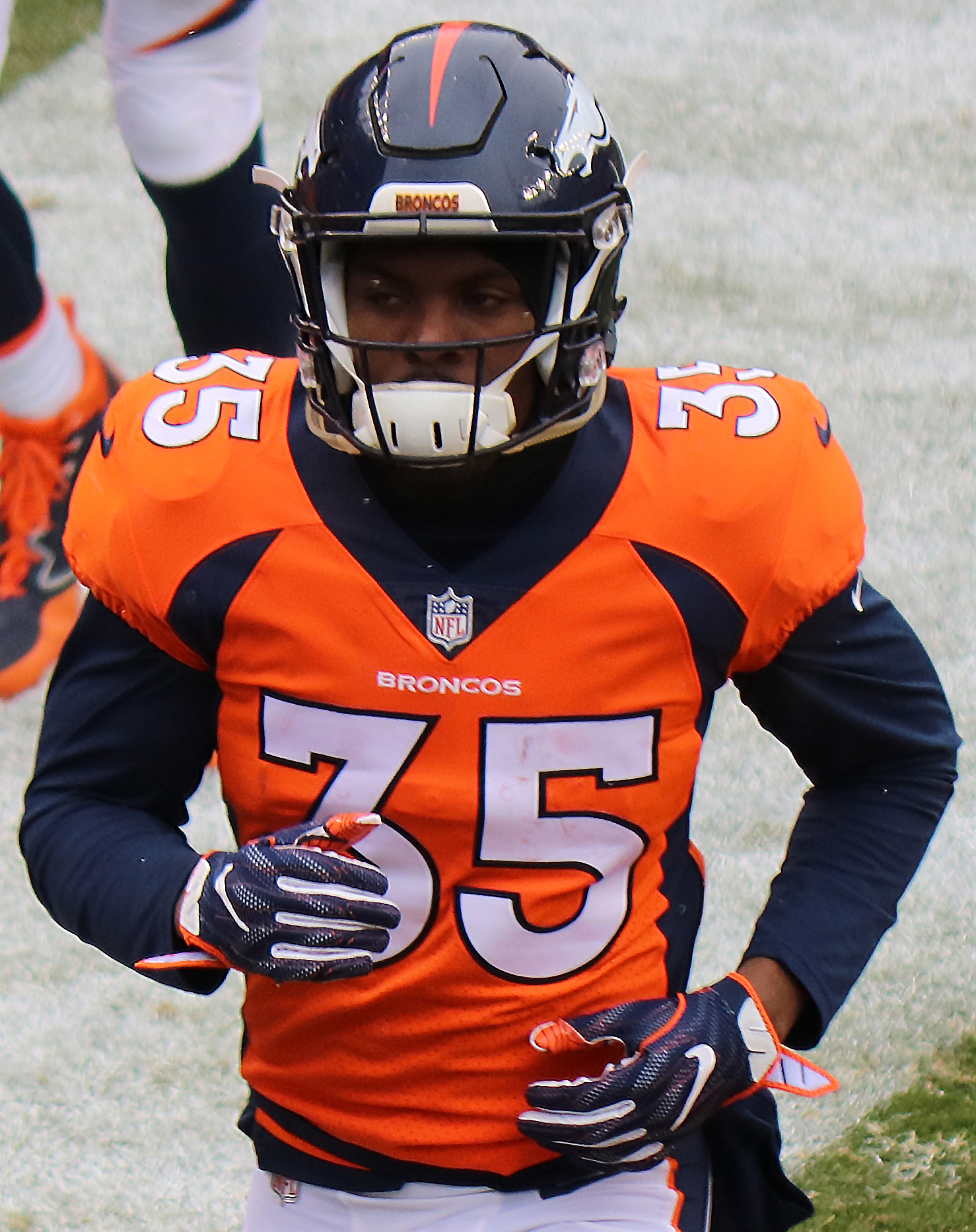
- Thomas in 2017

No. 35
- Position: Safety

Personal information
- Born: November 30, 1993 (age 32); Alliance, Ohio, U.S.
- Listed height: 6 ft 2 in (1.88 m)
- Listed weight: 199 lb (90 kg)

Career information
- High school: Marlington (Alliance)
- College: Michigan
- NFL draft: 2017: undrafted

Career history
- Denver Broncos (2017–2019)

Career NFL statistics
- Total tackles: 20
- Sacks: 1
- Fumble recoveries: 1
- Pass deflections: 1
- Interceptions: 1
- Stats at Pro Football Reference

Dymonte Dominic Thomas (born November 30, 1993) is an American former professional football player who was a safety in the National Football League (NFL). He played college football for the Michigan Wolverines.

== Professional career ==
Thomas signed with the Denver Broncos as an undrafted free agent on May 11, 2017. He was waived by the Broncos on September 2, 2017 and was signed to the practice squad the next day. He was promoted to the active roster on December 14, 2017.

On August 31, 2019, Thomas was waived/injured by the Broncos and placed on injured reserve. He was waived from injured reserve on January 10, 2020.

== Post professional career ==
Thomas is the owner and head-coach of his own sports performance training company, Dymonte Thomas Sports Academy where he focuses on providing individual, small group, and team coaching to help the next generation of athletes.
