= 2015 Denver Broncos season =

American football team season

- Owner: The Pat Bowlen Trust
- General manager: John Elway
- Head coach: Gary Kubiak
- Offensive coordinator: Rick Dennison
- Defensive coordinator: Wade Phillips
- Home stadium: Sports Authority Field at Mile High

Results
- Record: 12–4
- Division place: 1st AFC West
- Playoffs: Won Divisional Playoffs (vs. Steelers) 23–16; Won AFC Championship (vs. Patriots) 20–18; Won Super Bowl 50 (vs. Panthers) 24–10
- All-Pros: 2: LB Von Miller; CB Chris Harris Jr.
- Pro Bowlers: 4: Selected but did not participate due to participation in Super Bowl 50: LB Von Miller; LB DeMarcus Ware; CB Chris Harris Jr.; CB Aqib Talib

Uniform
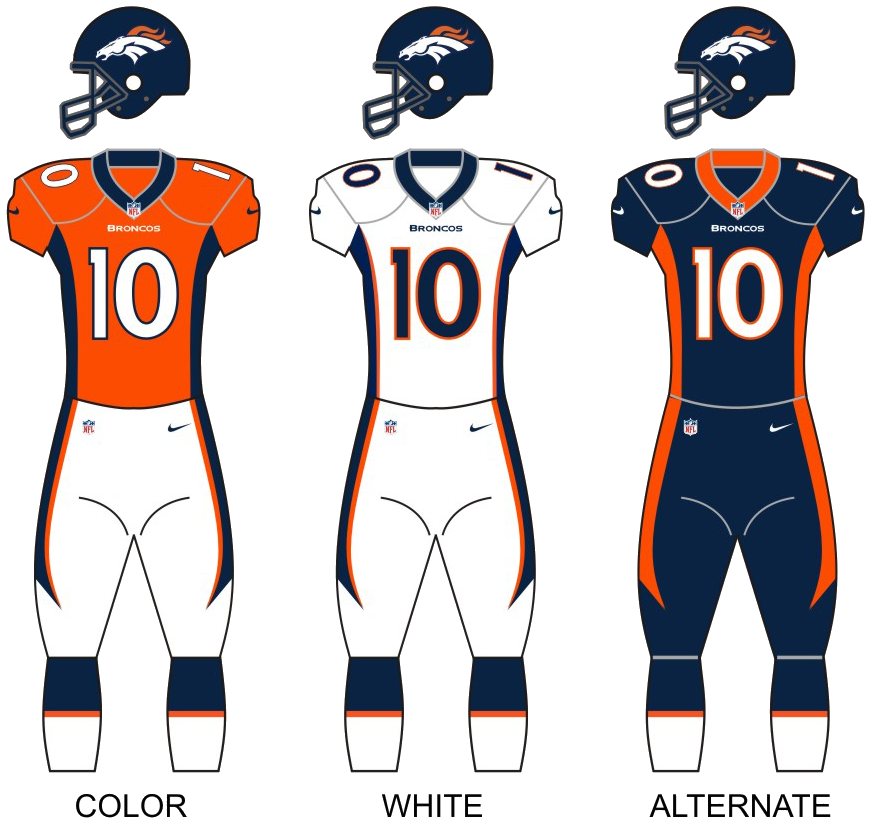

The 2015 season was the Denver Broncos' 46th season in the National Football League (NFL) and the 56th overall. It was also the fourth season with Peyton Manning as the team's starting quarterback, as well as the final season of Manning's 18-year NFL career.

After losing in the divisional round of the playoffs two of the last three seasons and getting blown out in Super Bowl XLVIII by the Seattle Seahawks, the Broncos underwent numerous coaching changes, including a mutual parting with head coach John Fox, and the hiring of Gary Kubiak as the new head coach. Under Kubiak and offensive coordinator Rick Dennison, the Broncos planned to install a run-oriented West coast offense with zone blocking to blend in with Manning's shotgun passing style, but struggled with numerous changes and injuries to the offensive line.

Manning missed six games due to a partial tear of the plantar fascia in his left foot and had his worst statistical season since his rookie year with the Indianapolis Colts in 1998. Backup quarterback Brock Osweiler filled in for Manning during the second half of the regular season, before Manning re-claimed the starting quarterback position prior to the team's postseason run. Under defensive coordinator Wade Phillips, the Broncos' defense ranked No. 1 in total yards, passing yards, average yards per rush and sacks, and like the previous three seasons, the team continued to set numerous individual, league and franchise records. The team's defense is widely considered to be among the greatest of all time, particularly due to the fact that it was pressured to aid a lackluster offense for most of the season. The team's defensive backfield, arguably the most dominant part of the defense, gave itself the nickname "No Fly Zone."

The Broncos clinched their fifth-consecutive AFC West division title for the record-tying 15th time, fourth consecutive first-round bye, and home-field advantage throughout the AFC playoffs as the No. 1 playoff seed for the third time in four seasons. As was the case during the regular season, the Broncos' defense dominated their playoff opponents. During the Broncos' three playoff games, they recorded 14 sacks, forced seven turnovers, surrendered only one touchdown pass and gave up just 44 combined points (an average of just 14.7 points a game). The Broncos defeated the Pittsburgh Steelers 23–16 in the divisional round and the defending Super Bowl champion New England Patriots 20–18 in the AFC Championship Game. The Broncos then defeated the Carolina Panthers 24–10 in Super Bowl 50 to earn the franchise's third Super Bowl championship, and the first since winning back-to-back Super Bowls in 1997 and 1998.

This was the last season the Broncos made the playoffs and finished with a winning record until 2024. It was also the last AFC West title for the Broncos until 2025, and the last season a team other than the Kansas City Chiefs won the division until then.

== Coaching changes ==
=== Departures ===
On January 12, 2015, one day after the Broncos' 24–13 loss to the Indianapolis Colts in the divisional round of the 2014 playoffs, the Broncos and head coach John Fox decided to mutually part ways. Fox compiled a 49–22 record in four seasons (including the playoffs), led the Broncos to four consecutive AFC West division titles, a first-round bye in three consecutive seasons as well as a berth in Super Bowl XLVIII, but lost in the divisional round of the playoffs in three of his four seasons as head coach. Fox departed with a .719 winning percentage in his four seasons as head coach – the highest in franchise history. Four days later (January 16), Fox was hired as the new head coach of the Chicago Bears.

The following former Broncos' coaching assistants from 2014 were reunited with John Fox in Chicago: Defensive backs coach Sam Garnes, special teams coordinator Jeff Rodgers, defensive line coach Jay Rodgers, offensive coordinator Adam Gase, offensive line coach Dave Magazu, assistant special teams coordinator Derius Swinton II, assistant strength & conditioning coach Jason George and offensive quality control coach Bo Hardegree.

Defensive coordinator Jack Del Rio was hired as the new head coach of the Oakland Raiders, defensive backs coach Cory Undlin was hired to the same position with the Philadelphia Eagles and linebackers coach Richard Smith was hired to a senior defensive position with the Atlanta Falcons.

=== Additions ===
On January 18, 2015, the Broncos finalized a deal that made Kubiak the team's new head coach, and he was formally introduced at a press conference at the team's Dove Valley headquarters on January 20. Kubiak served as a backup quarterback to Broncos' executive vice president/general manager John Elway from 1983 to 1991, and also served as the Broncos' offensive coordinator from 1995 to 2005, before serving as the Houston Texans' head coach from 2006 to 2013. Kubiak served as the Baltimore Ravens' offensive coordinator in 2014.

The following eight coaching assistants were reunited with Kubiak:

Name	Position	Previous association with Gary Kubiak	Source
Tony Coaxum	Assistant special teams coordinator	Ravens' special teams intern, 2014	
Joe DeCamillis	Special teams coordinator	Broncos' special teams coordinator, 1988–92	
Rick Dennison	Offensive coordinator	Broncos' linebacker, 1982–90; Broncos' coaching assistant, 1995–2009; Texans' offensive coordinator, 2010–13; Ravens' quarterbacks coach, 2014	
Reggie Herring	Linebackers coach	Texans' linebackers coach, 2011–13	
Bill Kollar	Defensive line coach	Texans' defensive line coach, 2009–14	
Marc Lubick	Assistant wide receivers coach	Texans' offensive coaching assistant, 2010–13	
Brian Pariani	Tight ends coach	Broncos' tight ends coach, 1995–2004; Texans' tight ends coach, 2006–13; Ravens' tight ends coach, 2014	
Wade Phillips	Defensive coordinator	Broncos' defensive coordinator, 1989–92; Texans' defensive coordinator, 2011–13	

Other additions

Clancy Barone, who had served as the Broncos' tight ends coach since 2011, was moved to the offensive line coach position that he held in 2010. Joe Woods was hired as the defensive backs coach. Woods served in the same capacity with the Oakland Raiders in 2014. Fred Pagac was hired as the team's outside linebackers coach. He served as the Buffalo Bills' linebackers coach in 2014. Samson Brown was hired as the team's assistant defensive backs coach. Like Pagac, Brown also served on the Bills' staff in 2014.

== Front office changes ==
- February 27: Jerry Butler, who served as the team's director of player development since 2011, was hired to the same position with the Chicago Bears. The Broncos declined to renew his contract following the 2014 season.
- May 14: Anthony Kelly was hired by the Chicago Bears to become their new director of pro personnel. Kelly was promoted to the Broncos' assistant director of pro personnel position in 2010. He would now head that department for the Bears, along with nine coaches who were with the Broncos in 2014.

== Roster changes ==
=== Free agents ===
Position	Player	Tag	2015 Team	Notes
LS	Aaron Brewer	RFA	Denver Broncos	re-signed March 5
S	Quinton Carter	UFA	None	
CB	Tony Carter	RFA	None	assigned tender on March 9, re-signed April 27, released September 5
OT	Paul Cornick	ERFA	None	assigned tender on March 6, waived May 4
G	Orlando Franklin	UFA	San Diego Chargers	signed with the Chargers on March 10
G	Ben Garland	ERFA	Atlanta Falcons	assigned tender on March 6, re-signed April 10, waived September 5, promoted from the Falcons' practice squad on December 15
TE	Virgil Green	UFA	Denver Broncos	re-signed March 10
LB	Nate Irving	UFA	Indianapolis Colts	signed with the Colts on March 20
LB	Steven Johnson	UFA	Tennessee Titans	originally an RFA, re-signed March 10, waived September 5, claimed by the Titans on September 6
DT	Terrance Knighton	UFA	Washington Redskins	signed with the Redskins on March 12
LB	Brandon Marshall	ERFA	Denver Broncos	assigned tender on March 6, re-signed April 13
C	Will Montgomery	UFA	Chicago Bears	signed with the Bears on April 2
S	Rahim Moore	UFA	Houston Texans	signed with the Texans on March 12
TE	Jacob Tamme	UFA	Atlanta Falcons	signed with the Falcons on March 19
WR	Demaryius Thomas	FT	Denver Broncos	assigned franchise tag on March 2, re-signed July 15
DT	Mitch Unrein	UFA	San Diego Chargers	signed with the Chargers on March 18
WR/RS	Wes Welker	UFA	St. Louis Rams	signed with the Rams on November 9

=== Signings ===
Position	Player	2014 Team	Notes
RB	Kapri Bibbs	Practice squad	promoted to the active roster on October 17, waived October 19, assigned to the practice squad on October 21
C	Sam Brenner	Miami Dolphins	signed November 18
S	Josh Bush	New York Jets/Denver Broncos	signed December 1
TE/FB	James Casey	Philadelphia Eagles	signed April 11, released October 9
TE	Owen Daniels	Baltimore Ravens	signed March 10
TE/FB	Joe Don Duncan	None	signed March 10, waived August 31
C	James Ferentz	Houston Texans	signed September 6
DE	Sione Fua	Cleveland Browns	signed August 6, released September 5
TE	Richard Gordon	Tennessee Titans; Kansas City Chiefs	signed October 14, released October 17, re-signed October 19, waived December 1
OT	Matt Hall	Indianapolis Colts	signed August 10, retired August 11
OT	Ryan Harris	Kansas City Chiefs	signed May 28
TE	Mitchell Henry	Green Bay Packers	signed September 6, waived October 14
TE	Marcel Jensen	Jacksonville Jaguars	signed May 12, waived September 5
S	Shiloh Keo	Houston Texans	signed December 9
P	Spencer Lanning	Cleveland Browns	signed August 14, waived August 31
WR	Corbin Louks	None	signed August 3, waived September 5
G	Evan Mathis	Philadelphia Eagles	signed August 25
TE	Jake Murphy	None	signed August 20, waived August 31
G	Robert Myers	Baltimore Ravens	signed off the Ravens' practice squad on December 30
WR	Solomon Patton	Tampa Bay Buccaneers; Arizona Cardinals	signed May 12, waived August 28
OT	Tyler Polumbus	Washington Redskins	signed October 1
QB	Christian Ponder	Minnesota Vikings	signed November 25, waived December 8
S	Shaun Prater	Minnesota Vikings	signed December 22, released December 29
P	Karl Schmitz	None	signed March 12, waived August 6
DE	Antonio Smith	Oakland Raiders	signed April 2
G	Shelley Smith	Miami Dolphins	signed March 13, waived November 18
S	Darian Stewart	Baltimore Ravens	signed March 13
LB	Reggie Walker	San Diego Chargers	signed March 19, released August 31
DE	Vance Walker	Kansas City Chiefs	signed March 12

Indicates that the player was a free agent at the end of his respective team's 2014 season.

=== Departures ===
Position	Player	Notes
RB	Montee Ball	released September 6
PK	Connor Barth	released August 26
RB	Jeremy Stewart	waived August 31
DE	Quanterus Smith	waived April 28

=== Trades ===
- April 1: The Broncos acquired center/guard Gino Gradkowski in a trade with the Baltimore Ravens that involved 2016 draft-pick considerations. Gradkowski was later released on September 6.
- August 31: Offensive tackle Chris Clark was traded to the Houston Texans in exchange for a 2016 seventh-round selection.
- November 2: The Broncos acquired tight end Vernon Davis in a trade with the San Francisco 49ers that involved 2016 and 2017 draft-pick considerations.

=== Draft ===
2015 Denver Broncos Draft
Round	Selection	Player	Position	College	Notes
1	23	Shane Ray	LB	Missouri	signed June 1
2	59	Ty Sambrailo	OT	Colorado State	signed May 15, placed on injured reserve November 2
3	92	Jeff Heuerman	TE	Ohio State	injured during rookie minicamp, signed June 4, placed on injured reserve August 31
4	133 *	Max Garcia	C	Florida	signed May 13
5	164	Lorenzo Doss	CB	Tulane	signed May 14
6	203	Darius Kilgo	NT	Maryland	signed May 13
7	250 *	Trevor Siemian	QB	Northwestern	signed May 15
7	251 *	Taurean Nixon	CB	Tulane	signed May 15, waived September 5, assigned to the practice squad on September 6, promoted to the active roster on January 19, 2016
7	252 *	Josh Furman	S	Oklahoma State	signed May 15, waived September 5

*	Compensatory selection

==== Draft trades ====
Trade partner	Broncos give	Broncos receive	Source
Chicago Bears	2014 fourth- and seventh-round selections	2014 fifth-round selection 2015 fifth-round selection (No. 143 – later traded to the Detroit Lions)	
Detroit Lions	Original 2015 first-round selection (No. 28); 2015 fifth-round selection (No. 143); 2016 fifth-round selection Guard/Center Manny Ramirez	2015 first-round selection (No. 23)	
New York Giants	Original 2015 seventh-round selection (No. 245)	Placekicker Brandon McManus	
San Francisco 49ers	Original 2015 fourth-round selection (No. 126); 2014 second- and fifth-round selections	2014 second- and seventh-round selections	

=== Undrafted free agents ===
All undrafted free agents were signed after the 2015 NFL draft concluded on May 2, unless noted otherwise. For the first time since 2003, the Broncos did not have at least one rookie free agent that made the Week 1 regular season roster.

2015 Denver Broncos undrafted free agents
Player	Position	College	Notes
LB	Zaire Anderson	Nebraska	waived September 5, assigned to the practice squad on September 6
G	Andre Davis	Buffalo	signed May 12, waived August 31
C	Dillon Day	Mississippi State	waived September 5, assigned to the practice squad on September 6
TE	Dan Light	Fordham	signed August 28, waived September 1, assigned to the practice squad on December 2
WR	Matt Miller	Boise State	waived May 11
NT	Chuka Ndulue	Oklahoma	waived September 5, assigned to the practice squad on September 6
WR	David Porter	Texas Christian	signed May 12, waived August 10
OT	Connor Rains	Wyoming	waived August 2
OT	Kyle Roberts	Nevada	waived September 5, assigned to the practice squad on September 7
OT	Charles Sweeton	Tennessee-Martin	signed August 2, waived September 5
WR	Jordan Taylor	Rice	waived September 5, assigned to the practice squad on September 6
DE	Josh Watson	Clemson	waived September 5

=== Suspensions ===
- July 24: Defensive end Derek Wolfe was suspended for the first four games of the season for violating the league's policy on performance-enhancing substances.
- September 3: Safety T. J. Ward was suspended for the team's regular season opener vs. the Baltimore Ravens for violating the league's personal conduct policy. The suspension was the result of a May 2014 incident in which Ward threw a mug at a female bartender inside a Denver strip club.
- November 9: Cornerback Aqib Talib was suspended for one game for an eye-gouging incident with Indianapolis Colts' tight end Dwayne Allen, during the Broncos' Week 9 loss to the Colts. Talib unsuccessfully appealed his suspension, and missed the team's Week 10 loss to the Kansas City Chiefs.

=== Injuries ===
- May 9: Tight end Jeff Heuerman, the team's third-round draft selection, suffered a ruptured ACL in his left knee during rookie minicamp. Though he signed his rookie contract on June 4, he was placed on the season-ending injured reserve on August 31.
- May 27: Offensive tackle Ryan Clady suffered a ruptured ACL in his left knee, during the Broncos' organized team activities (OTAs), and was placed on injured reserve two days later (May 29).
- August 1: Wide receiver Kyle Williams suffered a ruptured Achilles tendon during the second day of training camp, and was placed on injured reserve two days later (August 3).
- August 20: Defensive tackle Marvin Austin was placed on injured reserve due to a groin injury. He was later released from the injured reserve on October 27.
- October 18: Linebacker Shane Ray, the team's first-round draft selection, suffered a sprained MCL in his right knee, during the Broncos' Week 6 win over the Cleveland Browns, and missed the team's next two games.
- November 2: Offensive tackle Ty Sambrailo, the team's second-round draft selection, was placed on injured reserve on November 2, due to a shoulder injury that he sustained during the team's Week 3 win over the Detroit Lions.
- November 16: Wide receiver Emmanuel Sanders suffered a finger injury, as well as an ankle injury during the Broncos' Week 9 loss to the Indianapolis Colts, and missed the Broncos' Week 11 win over the Chicago Bears.
- November 25: Defensive end Kenny Anunike was placed on injured reserve, after undergoing knee surgery during the preseason. He was active for only three games during the season.
- November 29: Safety T. J. Ward suffered an ankle sprain during the Broncos' Week 12 win over the New England Patriots, and missed the team's next two games.
- December 6: Linebacker Danny Trevathan suffered a concussion during the Broncos' Week 13 win over the San Diego Chargers, and missed the Broncos' Week 14 loss to the Oakland Raiders.

Omar Bolden

Safety/return specialist Omar Bolden missed the last four games of the regular season due to a hamstring injury. He returned for the team's Divisional playoff win over the Pittsburgh Steelers on January 17, 2016, only to suffer a torn knee ligament on a non-contact play during the first quarter. Bolden was placed on injured reserve one day later (January 18), and missed the remainder of the Broncos' postseason run.

David Bruton

Safety David Bruton suffered a concussion during the Broncos' Week 13 win over the San Diego Chargers, and missed the Broncos' Week 14 loss to the Oakland Raiders. Bruton returned to action the following week, and initially thought he suffered a bruised fibula, after he collided with teammate T. J. Ward, during the Broncos' Week 15 loss to the Pittsburgh Steelers. However, it was later revealed that Bruton played the remainder of the game with his fibula fractured, and the team placed him on the season-ending injured reserve two days later (December 22).

DeMarcus Ware

Linebacker DeMarcus Ware was twice sidelined with back injuries. Ware initially suffered a back injury during the team's Week 5 win over the Oakland Raiders on October 11, and missed the team's next game at the Cleveland Browns. Ware re-aggravated the same back injury during the Broncos' Week 9 loss to the Indianapolis Colts, and missed the team's next five games.

=== Absence of Peyton Manning ===
On November 16, one day after quarterback Peyton Manning had one of the worst games of his career, media reports indicated that Manning had a partial tear of the plantar fascia in his left foot. The Denver Post indicated that Manning initially suffered the injury during the Broncos' Week 9 loss to the Indianapolis Colts during the previous week, though another report indicated that Manning had been dealing with the injury since training camp. Backup quarterback Brock Osweiler replaced Manning in the third quarter of the Broncos' Week 10 loss to the Kansas City Chiefs, and was announced as the starting quarterback, beginning with the Broncos' Week 11 game at the Chicago Bears. Following an ineffective performance by Osweiler during the first half of the team's Week 17 win over the San Diego Chargers, Manning made his return during the third quarter of that same game, and re-claimed the starting quarterback position for the playoffs.

== Staff ==
2015 Denver Broncos staff
Front office: Owner – The Pat Bowlen Trust; President/chairman/CEO – Joe Ellis; Executive vice president of football operations/general manager – John Elway; Director of football administration – Mike Sullivan; Director of player personnel – Matt Russell; Director of pro personnel – Tom Heckert Jr.; Assistant director of college scouting – Adam Peters; Assistant director of pro personnel – A. J. Durso; Head coaches: Head coach – Gary Kubiak; Offensive coaches: Offensive coordinator – Rick Dennison; Quarterbacks/passing game coordinator – Greg Knapp; Running backs – Eric Studesville; Wide receivers – Tyke Tolbert; Assistant wide receivers – Marc Lubick; Tight ends – Brian Pariani; Offensive line – Clancy Barone; Assistant offensive line – James Cregg; Offensive assistant/quarterbacks – Brian Callahan	Defensive coaches: Defensive coordinator – Wade Phillips; Defensive line – Bill Kollar; Linebackers – Reggie Herring; Outside linebackers – Fred Pagac; Defensive backs – Joe Woods; Assistant defensive backs – Samson Brown; Defensive assistant – Chris Beake; Special teams coaches: Special teams coordinator – Joe DeCamillis; Assistant special teams – Tony Coaxum; Strength and conditioning: Strength and conditioning – Luke Richesson; Assistant strength and conditioning – Mike Eubanks; Assistant strength and conditioning – Anthony Lomando; Assistant strength and conditioning – Dennis Love

== Final roster ==
2015 Denver Broncos roster
Quarterbacks (QB): 18 Peyton Manning; 17 Brock Osweiler; 13 Trevor Siemian; Running backs (RB): 22 C. J. Anderson; 23 Ronnie Hillman; 40 Juwan Thompson; Wide receivers (WR): 12 Andre Caldwell; 16 Bennie Fowler; 14 Cody Latimer; 11 Jordan Norwood; 10 Emmanuel Sanders; 88 Demaryius Thomas; Tight ends (TE): 81 Owen Daniels; 80 Vernon Davis; 85 Virgil Green	Offensive linemen (OL): 67 Sam Brenner C; 53 James Ferentz C; 73 Max Garcia G; 68 Ryan Harris T; 69 Evan Mathis G; 70 Robert Myers G; 61 Matt Paradis C; 76 Tyler Polumbus T; 79 Michael Schofield T; 65 Louis Vasquez G; Defensive linemen (DL): 97 Malik Jackson DT; 98 Darius Kilgo NT; 90 Antonio Smith DE; 96 Vance Walker DE; 92 Sylvester Williams DT; 95 Derek Wolfe DE	Linebackers (LB): 48 Shaquil Barrett OLB; 51 Todd Davis ILB; 54 Brandon Marshall ILB; 55 Lerentee McCray OLB; 58 Von Miller OLB; 52 Corey Nelson ILB; 56 Shane Ray OLB; 59 Danny Trevathan ILB; 94 DeMarcus Ware OLB; Defensive backs (DB): 31 Omar Bolden CB; 20 Josh Bush FS; 37 Lorenzo Doss CB; 25 Chris Harris Jr. CB; 33 Shiloh Keo SS; 29 Bradley Roby CB; 26 Darian Stewart FS; 21 Aqib Talib CB; 43 T. J. Ward SS; 36 Kayvon Webster CB; Special teams (ST): 46 Aaron Brewer LS; 4 Britton Colquitt P; 8 Brandon McManus K	Practice squad: 50 Zaire Anderson ILB; 35 Kapri Bibbs RB; 62 Dillon Day C; 75 Cameron Jefferson T; 84 Dan Light TE; 32 Ryan Murphy SS; 39 Taurean Nixon CB; 66 Kyle Roberts T; 87 Jordan Taylor WR; 99 George Uko DE; Reserve: 91 Kenny Anunike DE (IR); 30 David Bruton SS (IR); 78 Ryan Clady T (IR); 82 Jeff Heuerman TE (IR); 74 Ty Sambrailo T (IR); 15 Kyle Williams WR (IR); Rookies in italics 53 active, 6 reserve, 10 practice squad

== Preseason ==
Week	Date	Opponent	Result	Record	Venue	Recap
1	August 14	at Seattle Seahawks	W 22–20	1–0	CenturyLink Field	Recap
2	August 22	at Houston Texans	W 14–10	2–0	NRG Stadium	Recap
3	August 29	San Francisco 49ers	W 19–12	3–0	Sports Authority Field at Mile High	Recap
4	September 3	Arizona Cardinals	L 20–22	3–1	Sports Authority Field at Mile High	Recap

== Regular season ==
=== Schedule ===
Week	Date	Opponent	Result	Record	Venue	Recap
1	September 13	Baltimore Ravens	**W** 19–13	1–0	Sports Authority Field at Mile High	Recap
2	September 17	at **Kansas City Chiefs**	**W** 31–24	2–0	Arrowhead Stadium	Recap
3	September 27	at Detroit Lions	**W** 24–12	3–0	Ford Field	Recap
4	October 4	Minnesota Vikings	**W** 23–20	4–0	Sports Authority Field at Mile High	Recap
5	October 11	at **Oakland Raiders**	**W** 16–10	5–0	O.co Coliseum	Recap
6	October 18	at Cleveland Browns	**W** 26–23 (OT)	6–0	FirstEnergy Stadium	Recap
7	Bye					
8	November 1	Green Bay Packers	**W** 29–10	7–0	Sports Authority Field at Mile High	Recap
9	November 8	at Indianapolis Colts	**L** 24–27	7–1	Lucas Oil Stadium	Recap
10	November 15	**Kansas City Chiefs**	**L** 13–29	7–2	Sports Authority Field at Mile High	Recap
11	November 22	at Chicago Bears	**W** 17–15	8–2	Soldier Field	Recap
12	November 29	New England Patriots	**W** 30–24 (OT)	9–2	Sports Authority Field at Mile High	Recap
13	December 6	at **San Diego Chargers**	**W** 17–3	10–2	Qualcomm Stadium	Recap
14	December 13	**Oakland Raiders**	**L** 12–15	10–3	Sports Authority Field at Mile High	Recap
15	December 20	at Pittsburgh Steelers	**L** 27–34	10–4	Heinz Field	Recap
16	December 28	Cincinnati Bengals	**W** 20–17 (OT)	11–4	Sports Authority Field at Mile High	Recap
17	January 3	**San Diego Chargers**	**W** 27–20	12–4	Sports Authority Field at Mile High	Recap

Note: Intra-division opponents are in bold text.

=== Game summaries ===
==== Week 1: vs. Baltimore Ravens ====
Week One: Baltimore Ravens at Denver Broncos – Game summary

Quarter	1	2	3	4	Total
Ravens	0	3	10	0	**13**
**Broncos**	6	3	7	3	**19**

at Sports Authority Field at Mile High, Denver, Colorado

- Date: September 13
- Game time: 2:25 p.m. MDT
- Game weather: 88 °F (31 °C), partly sunny
- Game attendance: 76,798
- Referee: Gene Steratore
- TV announcers (CBS): Jim Nantz, Phil Simms and Tracy Wolfson
- Recap, Gamebook

Game information

**First quarter**

- DEN – 5:16 Brandon McManus 57-yard FG. Drive: 15 plays, 48 yards, 6:17. (DEN 3–0)
- DEN – 1:26 Brandon McManus 56-yard FG. Drive: 6 plays, 15 yards, 2:09. (DEN 6–0)

**Second quarter**

- BAL – 6:42 Justin Tucker 52-yard FG. Drive: 8 plays, 31 yards, 4:14. (DEN 6–3)
- DEN – 0:09 Brandon McManus 43-yard FG. Drive: 7 plays, 30 yards, 1:04. (DEN 9–3)

**Third quarter**

- BAL – 14:04 Jimmy Smith 24-yard interception return for a TD, Justin Tucker kick. (BAL 10–9)
- BAL – 9:33 Justin Tucker 44-yard FG. Drive: 8 plays, 35 yards, 2:51. (BAL 13–9)
- DEN – 0:10 Aqib Talib 51-yard interception return for a TD, Brandon McManus kick. (DEN 16–13)

**Fourth quarter**

- DEN – 2:55 Brandon McManus 33-yard FG. Drive: 17 plays, 81 yards, 10:56. **(DEN 19–13)**

**Top passers**

- BAL – Joe Flacco: 18/32, 117 yards, 2 INT
- DEN – Peyton Manning: 24/40, 175 yards, 1 INT

**Top rushers**

- BAL – Justin Forsett: 14 rushes, 43 yards
- DEN – Ronnie Hillman: 12 rushes, 41 yards

**Top receivers**

- BAL – Marlon Brown: 2 receptions, 25 yards
- DEN – Emmanuel Sanders: 8 receptions, 65 yards

**Top tacklers**

- BAL – Jimmy Smith: 8 tackles, 1 interception
- DEN – Danny Trevathan and Brandon Marshall: 6 tackles each (3 assists by Trevathan, 1 assist by Marshall)

The Broncos kicked off the 2015 season against the Baltimore Ravens, the Broncos' fifth-consecutive Week 1 home opener. Two first-quarter field goals by placekicker Brandon McManus – from 57 and 56 yards out – gave the Broncos the early 6-point advantage. In the second quarter, a 44-yard field goal by placekicker Justin Tucker got the Ravens on the scoreboard. McManus later countered with a 43-yard field goal just before halftime to put the lead back to 6. Three plays into the Broncos' initial possession of the second half, quarterback Peyton Manning was intercepted by Ravens' cornerback Jimmy Smith for a 24-yard touchdown, in what was the Ravens' only touchdown of the game. After forcing a Broncos' punt, the Ravens increased their lead, with a 44-yard field goal by Tucker. The Broncos were forced to punt on their next two third-quarter offensive possessions. With 10 seconds remaining in the third quarter, the Broncos re-claimed the lead, with cornerback Aqib Talib returning an interception off Ravens' quarterback Joe Flacco 51 yards for a touchdown, in what was the Broncos' only touchdown of the game. The Broncos' defense forced the Ravens' to punt on their next possession early in the fourth quarter, and beginning at the 13:51 mark, the Broncos began a 17-play, 81-yard drive that devoured 10:51 off the clock, but had to settle for a 33-yard field goal by McManus to increase to a 19–13 lead. With 2:55 remaining in the game, the Ravens advanced to as far as the Broncos' 16-yard line, hoping for a game-winning touchdown. On the 14th play of the drive, a pass from Flacco to wide receiver Steve Smith, Sr. that was almost a touchdown was deflected by Broncos' cornerback Bradley Roby near the goal line, falling incomplete. On the next play, with 36 seconds remaining, a pass from Flacco intended for tight end Crockett Gillmore was intercepted by safety Darian Stewart in the end zone, sealing the Broncos' fourth consecutive Week 1 victory.

Notes

This marked the first time since September 17, 2006, that the Broncos won a game without scoring an offensive touchdown. Peyton Manning failed to throw a touchdown pass in a season opener for the first time since 2003.

==== Week 2: at Kansas City Chiefs ====
Week Two: Denver Broncos at Kansas City Chiefs – Game summary

Quarter	1	2	3	4	Total
**Broncos**	0	14	3	14	**31**
Chiefs	0	14	3	7	**24**

at Arrowhead Stadium, Kansas City, Missouri

- Date: September 17
- Game time: 7:25 p.m. CDT/6:25 pm. MDT
- Game weather: 87 °F (31 °C), cloudy
- Game attendance: 76,404
- Referee: Walt Anderson
- TV announcers (CBS/NFLN): Jim Nantz, Phil Simms and Tracy Wolfson
- Recap, Gamebook

Game information

**First quarter**

- No scoring plays

**Second quarter**

- KC – 9:11 Jamaal Charles 34-yard TD run, Cairo Santos kick. Drive: 6 plays, 78 yards, 3:23. (KC 7–0)
- KC – 6:27 Marcus Peters 55-yard interception return for a TD, Cairo Santos kick. (KC 14–0)
- DEN – 2:31 Emmanuel Sanders 16-yard TD pass from Peyton Manning, Brandon McManus kick. Drive: 10 plays, 80 yards, 3:56. (KC 14–7)
- DEN – 0:48 Virgil Green 1-yard TD pass from Peyton Manning, Brandon McManus kick. Drive: 4 plays, 15 yards, 1:33. (tied 14–14)

**Third quarter**

- KC – 9:47 Cairo Santos 35-yard FG. Drive: 10 plays, 63 yards, 5:13. (KC 17–14)
- DEN – 3:18 Brandon McManus 54-yard FG. Drive: 5 plays, 22 yards, 1:42. (tied 17–17)

**Fourth quarter**

- KC – 2:27 Knile Davis 8-yard TD run, Cairo Santos kick. Drive: 6 plays, 61 yards, 2:15. (KC 24–17)
- DEN – 0:36 Emmanuel Sanders 19-yard TD pass from Peyton Manning, Brandon McManus kick. Drive: 10 plays, 80 yards, 1:51. (tied 24–24)
- DEN – 0:27 Bradley Roby 21-yard fumble return for a TD, Brandon McManus kick. **(DEN 31–24)**

**Top passers**

- DEN – Peyton Manning: 26/45, 256 yards, 3 TD, 1 INT
- KC – Alex Smith: 16/25, 191 yards, 2 INT

**Top rushers**

- DEN – Ronnie Hillman: 9 rushes, 34 yards
- KC – Jamaal Charles: 21 rushes, 125 yards, 1 TD

**Top receivers**

- DEN – Demaryius Thomas: 8 receptions, 116 yards
- KC – Travis Kelce: 4 receptions, 58 yards

**Top tacklers**

- DEN – Danny Trevathan: 7 tackles
- KC – Jaye Howard: 7 tackles

Coming off their hard-fought win over the Ravens, the Broncos traveled to Arrowhead Stadium for an AFC West duel with the Kansas City Chiefs on Thursday Night Football. There was no scoring in the first quarter, which included cornerback David Bruton forcing a fumble off Chiefs' running back Jamaal Charles at the Broncos' 6-yard line. The Chiefs grabbed the lead early in the second quarter, with Charles rushing for a 34-yard touchdown, then added to their lead, when cornerback Marcus Peters returned an interception off Broncos' quarterback Peyton Manning 55 yards for a touchdown. The Broncos responded with two touchdown passes by Manning – a 16-yarder to wide receiver Emmanuel Sanders followed by a 1-yard juggling touchdown catch by tight end Virgil Green just before halftime. The latter scoring play came after Chiefs' quarterback Alex Smith was intercepted by cornerback Aqib Talib deep in Chiefs' territory. That was Talib's 2nd pick in as many weeks.

The two teams exchanged field goals in the third quarter – a 35-yarder by Chiefs' placekicker Cairo Santos and a 54-yarder by Broncos' placekicker Brandon McManus. Following an exchange of punts, the Chiefs were attempting to re-claim the lead midway through the fourth quarter, when Smith was intercepted by cornerback Chris Harris, Jr. at the Broncos' 10-yard line with 6:40 remaining. However, the Broncos went three-and-out, and were forced to punt. The Chiefs took a 24–17 lead six plays later, with running back Knile Davis rushing for an 8-yard touchdown with 2:27 left in the game. Manning then engineered a 10-play, 80-yard drive, culminating in a 19-yard touchdown pass to Sanders with 36 seconds left. The game appeared to be headed to overtime, however, on the initial play of the Chiefs' ensuing possession, Broncos' linebacker Brandon Marshall forced a fumble off Charles deep in Chiefs' territory, and cornerback Bradley Roby returned the fumble 21 yards for a touchdown with 27 seconds in the game. The Broncos' defense subdued the Chiefs' last drive.

This was the last time the Broncos beat the Chiefs until Week 8 of the 2023 season and the last time they did so in Kansas City until 2025.

==== Week 3: at Detroit Lions ====
Week Three: Denver Broncos at Detroit Lions – Game summary

Quarter	1	2	3	4	Total
**Broncos**	0	14	0	10	**24**
Lions	0	6	6	0	**12**

at Ford Field, Detroit, Michigan

- Date: September 27
- Game time: 8:30 p.m. EDT/6:30 pm. MDT
- Game weather: Played indoors (dome stadium)
- Game attendance: 62,920
- Referee: Jeff Triplette
- TV announcers (NBC): Al Michaels, Cris Collinsworth and Michele Tafoya
- Recap, Gamebook

Game information

**First quarter**

- No scoring plays

**Second quarter**

- DEN – 4:54 Ronnie Hillman 1-yard TD run, Brandon McManus kick. Drive: 12 plays, 80 yards, 6:25. (DEN 7–0)
- DET – 1:03 Joique Bell 1-yard TD run, extra point blocked. Drive: 9 plays, 80 yards, 3:51. (DEN 7–6)
- DEN – 0:05 Demaryius Thomas 45-yard TD pass from Peyton Manning, Brandon McManus kick. Drive: 7 plays, 80 yards, 0:58. (DEN 14–6)

**Third quarter**

- DET – 10:51 Ameer Abdullah 16-yard TD pass from Matthew Stafford, two-point run failed. Drive: 4 plays, 29 yards, 2:09. (DEN 14–12)

**Fourth quarter**

- DEN – 7:50 Brandon McManus 48-yard FG. Drive: 5 plays, 19 yards, 2:22. (DEN 17–12)
- DEN – 2:28 Owen Daniels 11-yard TD pass from Peyton Manning, Brandon McManus kick. Drive: 5 plays, 51 yards, 1:09. **(DEN 24–12)**

**Top passers**

- DEN – Peyton Manning: 31/42, 324 yards, 2 TD, 1 INT
- DET – Matthew Stafford: 31/45, 282 yards, 1 TD, 2 INT

**Top rushers**

- DEN – C. J. Anderson: 8 rushes, 18 yards
- DET – Ameer Abdullah: 8 rushes, 23 yards, 1 receiving TD

**Top receivers**

- DEN – Demaryius Thomas: 9 receptions, 92 yards, 1 TD
- DET – Calvin Johnson: 8 receptions, 77 yards

**Top tacklers**

- DEN – Brandon Marshall: 10 tackles, 2 assists
- DET – Stephen Tulloch: 7 tackles, 4 assists

Coming off their comeback win over the Chiefs, the undefeated Broncos traveled to Ford Field to face the winless Detroit Lions on Sunday Night Football. After a scoreless first quarter, the Broncos grabbed the lead late in the second quarter, with running back Ronnie Hillman rushing for a 1-yard touchdown. With 1:07 remaining before halftime, the Lions countered, with a 1-yard touchdown run by running back Joique Bell. It was initially ruled as a fumble, but after review, it was reversed to a touchdown as a result of Bell breaking the plane of the goal line. However, Broncos' cornerback Aqib Talib blocked the extra point attempt by placekicker Matt Prater, leaving the score at 7–6. In the closing seconds of the first half, the Broncos responded, with quarterback Peyton Manning connecting on a 45-yard touchdown pass to wide receiver Demaryius Thomas on a 4th-and-1.

Following a questionable fumble by Thomas on the Broncos' opening possession of the second half, Lions' quarterback Matthew Stafford threw a 16-yard touchdown pass to running back Ameer Abdullah. However, the Broncos' defense denied a two-point conversion attempt by Bell that would have tied the game. Each team alternated punts through the next five possessions, until Broncos' linebacker Shaquil Barrett forced a fumble off Stafford near midfield. However, the Broncos had to settle for a 48-yard field goal by placekicker Brandon McManus at the 7:55 mark of the fourth quarter. The Lions were attempting to grab their first lead of the game, however, on the eighth play of the drive, Stafford was intercepted by Broncos' safety David Bruton. Five plays later, the Broncos expanded their lead, with Manning throwing an 11-yard touchdown pass to tight end Owen Daniels just before the two-minute warning to put the game out of reach. That was Daniels' first touchdown as a Bronco. Without any timeouts, the Lions advanced to as far as the Broncos' 15-yard line with 34 seconds remaining, but turned the football over on downs.

==== Week 4: vs. Minnesota Vikings ====
Week Four: Minnesota Vikings at Denver Broncos – Game summary

Quarter	1	2	3	4	Total
Vikings	0	10	0	10	**20**
**Broncos**	3	10	7	3	**23**

at Sports Authority Field at Mile High, Denver, Colorado

- Date: October 4
- Game time: 2:25 pm. MDT
- Game weather: 60 °F (16 °C), cloudy
- Game attendance: 77,029
- Referee: Walt Coleman
- TV announcers (Fox): Kevin Burkhardt, John Lynch and Pam Oliver
- Recap, Gamebook

Game information

**First quarter**

- DEN – 8:16 Brandon McManus 33-yard FG. Drive: 7 plays, 48 yards, 3:05. (DEN 3–0)

**Second quarter**

- DEN – 11:24 Ronnie Hillman 72-yard TD run, Brandon McManus kick. Drive: 1 play, 72 yards, 0:11. (DEN 10–0)
- DEN – 5:57 Brandon McManus 47-yard FG. Drive: 6 plays, 28 yards, 3:47. (DEN 13–0)
- MIN – 1:39 Blair Walsh 38-yard FG. Drive: 13 plays, 60 yards, 4:18. (DEN 13–3)
- MIN – 0:12 Mike Wallace 4-yard TD pass from Teddy Bridgewater, Blair Walsh kick. Drive: 2 plays, 27 yards, 0:11. (DEN 13–10)

**Third quarter**

- DEN – 11:10 Owen Daniels 1-yard TD pass from Peyton Manning, Brandon McManus kick. Drive: 8 plays, 80 yards, 3:50. (DEN 20–10)

**Fourth quarter**

- MIN – 10:01 Adrian Peterson 48-yard TD run, Blair Walsh kick. Drive: 9 plays, 97 yards, 4:48. (DEN 20–17)
- MIN – 5:11 Blair Walsh 33-yard FG. Drive: 7 plays, 38 yards, 3:56. (tied 20–20)
- DEN – 1:51 Brandon McManus 39-yard FG. Drive: 9 plays, 55 yards, 3:20. **(DEN 23–20)**

**Top passers**

- MIN – Teddy Bridgewater: 27/41, 269 yards, 1 TD
- DEN – Peyton Manning: 17/27, 213 yards, 1 TD, 2 INT

**Top rushers**

- MIN – Adrian Peterson: 16 rushes, 81 yards, 1 TD
- DEN – Ronnie Hillman: 11 rushes, 103 yards, 1 TD

**Top receivers**

- MIN – Stefon Diggs: 6 receptions, 87 yards
- DEN – Demaryius Thomas: 9 receptions, 93 yards

**Top tacklers**

- MIN – Anthony Barr: 5 tackles, 1 assist, 1 interception
- DEN – Brandon Marshall, Chris Harris, Jr. and T. J. Ward: 6 tackles each (3 assists by Marshall, 2 assists by Harris, 1 forced fumble by Ward)

Coming off their Sunday Night win over the Lions, the Broncos returned home for an interconference game vs. the Minnesota Vikings, the Broncos' only home game within a six-week span. The Broncos jumped out to a 13–0 lead, consisting of a 33-yard field goal by place kicker Brandon McManus, followed in the second quarter by a 72-yard touchdown run by running back Ronnie Hillman and another field goal by McManus – from 47 yards out. The Vikings got on the scoreboard just after the two-minute warning, with a 38-yard field goal by placekicker Blair Walsh. The Broncos were attempting to add to their lead on the Vikings' side of the field, however, quarterback Peyton Manning was intercepted by Vikings' linebacker Anthony Barr, who returned the football to the Broncos' 27-yard line. Two plays later, the Vikings narrowed the Broncos' lead, with quarterback Teddy Bridgewater finding wide receiver Mike Wallace alone in the end zone for a 4-yard touchdown just before halftime.

The Broncos took the opening possession of the second half, and added to their lead, with a 1-yard touchdown pass from Manning to tight end Owen Daniels on a 4th-and-goal. Each team alternated punts on the next four possessions, until Vikings' running back Adrian Peterson went untouched for a 48-yard touchdown on a 4th-and-1, with 10:09 remaining in the fourth quarter. Two plays into the Broncos' next possession, Manning was intercepted by safety Harrison Smith, and nine plays later, the Vikings pulled even at 20–20, with a 33-yard field goal by Walsh. The Broncos took a 23–20 lead two plays after the two-minute warning, with a 39-yard field goal by McManus. The Vikings had one last possession with 1:51 remaining in the game, however, on the sixth play of their final drive, Broncos' safety T. J. Ward forced a fumble off Bridgewater at the Vikings' 42-yard line, and linebacker Von Miller recovered the game-clinching fumble.

==== Week 5: at Oakland Raiders ====
Week Five: Denver Broncos at Oakland Raiders – Game summary

Quarter	1	2	3	4	Total
**Broncos**	0	3	6	7	**16**
Raiders	0	7	0	3	**10**

at O.co Coliseum, Oakland, California

- Date: October 11
- Game time: 2:25 pm. MDT/1:25 p.m. PDT
- Game weather: 72 °F (22 °C), sunny
- Game attendance: 54,500
- Referee: John Hussey
- TV announcers (CBS): Greg Gumbel, Trent Green and Jamie Erdahl
- Recap, Gamebook

Game information

**First quarter**

- No scoring plays

**Second quarter**

- DEN – 14:19 Brandon McManus 25-yard FG. Drive: 8 plays, 65 yards, 3:24. (DEN 3–0)
- OAK – 9:37 Marcel Reece 3-yard TD pass from Derek Carr, Sebastian Janikowski kick. Drive: 8 plays, 80 yards, 4:42. (OAK 7–3)

**Third quarter**

- DEN – 11:25 Brandon McManus 20-yard FG. Drive: 5 plays, 14 yards, 1:56. (OAK 7–6)
- DEN – 6:29 Brandon McManus 52-yard FG. Drive: 6 plays, 43 yards, 3:20. (DEN 9–7)

**Fourth quarter**

- DEN – 6:53 Chris Harris, Jr. 74-yard interception return for a TD, Brandon McManus kick. (DEN 16–7)
- OAK – 1:40 Sebastian Janikowski 50-yard FG. Drive: 1 play, 48 yards, 0:12. **(DEN 16–10)**

**Top passers**

- DEN – Peyton Manning: 22/35, 266 yards, 2 INT
- OAK – Derek Carr: 26/39, 249 yards, 1 TD, 1 INT

**Top rushers**

- DEN – C. J. Anderson: 11 rushes, 22 yards
- OAK – Latavius Murray: 13 rushes, 39 yards

**Top receivers**

- DEN – Emmanuel Sanders: 9 receptions, 111 yards
- OAK – Michael Crabtree: 4 receptions, 54 yards

**Top tacklers**

- DEN – Danny Trevathan and Brandon Marshall: 7 tackles each (3 assists by Trevathan, 1 assist by Marshall)
- OAK – D. J. Hayden and Neiko Thorpe: 5 tackles each

Coming off their win over the Vikings, the Broncos traveled to the O.co Coliseum to face their AFC West division rivals, the Oakland Raiders. Broncos' defensive tackle Sylvester Williams blocked a 38-yard field goal attempt by Raiders' placekicker Sebastian Janikowski late in the first quarter. The Broncos then marched down to as far as the Raiders' 8-yard line, but had to settle for a 25-yard field goal by placekicker Brandon McManus early in the second quarter. The Raiders then took a 7–3 lead, with fullback Marcel Reece receiving a 3-yard touchdown pass from quarterback Derek Carr. The Broncos were attempting to take the lead just before halftime, however, quarterback Peyton Manning was intercepted by Raiders' safety Charles Woodson in the end zone.

The Broncos' offense went three-and-out on the initial possession of the second half, and on the Raiders' first play from scrimmage, Broncos' linebacker Von Miller forced a strip sack and fumble recovery of Carr deep in Raiders' territory. The Broncos had to settle for a 20-yard field goal by McManus to pull to within 7–6. Following a Raiders' three-and-out, the Broncos re-claimed the lead, with a 52-yard field goal by McManus. Following another Woodson interception of Manning, the Raiders were attempting to take the lead on the first play of the fourth quarter, however, Janikowski missed wide-left on a 40-yard field goal attempt. Trailing 9–7, the Raiders were once again attempting to take lead, until Broncos' cornerback Chris Harris, Jr. stepped in front of an errant Carr pass and returned an interception 74 yards for a touchdown. With 6:14 remaining in the game, the Raiders were in punt formation with a 4th-and-6 at their own 24-yard line. However, a 5-yard neutral zone penalty on Broncos' safety Omar Bolden gave the Raiders a 4th-and-1, and after a successful fourth-down conversion, the Raiders kept the drive alive.

With 2:38 remaining in the game, the Broncos' defense denied a 4th-and-long pass completion from Carr to Reece near midfield. However, the Broncos were unable to earn a game-clinching first down just before the two-minute warning, which forced the Raiders to burn two of their three team timeouts. On the very next play, a defensive pass interference penalty on Broncos' cornerback Bradley Roby while defending a pass from Carr to wide receiver Amari Cooper moved the football to the Broncos' 32-yard line. With only one timeout remaining, the Raiders decided to send Janikowski onto the field for a 50-yard field goal to pull the Raiders to within 16–10 with 1:45 remaining in the game. The Raiders' onside kick attempt was unsuccessful, and were forced to use their last timeout on the Broncos' first play from scrimmage. Running back C. J. Anderson gained only two yards on three running plays. With eight seconds remaining, Cooper received a punt near the goal line, but the Broncos' defensive special teams subdued the Raiders' last desperation play of the game.

Notes

The Broncos earned their eighth consecutive win over the Raiders, the Broncos' longest winning streak over the Raiders in franchise history, a streak that the Raiders would snap later in the season, during the teams' Week 14 rematch in Denver.

==== Week 6: at Cleveland Browns ====
Week Six: Denver Broncos at Cleveland Browns – Game summary

Quarter	1	2	3	4	OT	Total
**Broncos**	3	7	3	10	3	**26**
Browns	0	0	7	16	0	**23**

at FirstEnergy Stadium, Cleveland, Ohio

- Date: October 18
- Game time: 1:00 pm. EDT/11:00 am. MDT
- Game weather: 47 °F (8 °C), sunny
- Game attendance: 67,431
- Referee: Craig Wrolstad
- TV announcers (CBS): Ian Eagle, Dan Fouts and Evan Washburn
- Recap, Gamebook

Game information

**First quarter**

- DEN – Brandon McManus 29-yard field goal, 2:53. Broncos 3–0. **Drive: 15 plays, 58 yards, 7:18.**

**Second quarter**

- DEN – Aqib Talib 63-yard interception return (Brandon McManus kick), 14:19. Broncos 10–0.

**Third quarter**

- CLE – Gary Barnidge 11-yard pass from Josh McCown (Travis Coons kick), 11:12. Broncos 10–7. **Drive: 8 plays, 74 yards, 3:53.**
- DEN – Brandon McManus 25-yard field goal, 2:08. Broncos 13–7. **Drive: 6 plays, 34 yards, 2:43.**

**Fourth quarter**

- DEN – Brandon McManus 39-yard field goal, 13:36. Broncos 16–7. **Drive: 8 plays, 51 yards, 3:07.**
- CLE – Gary Barnidge 14-yard pass from Josh McCown (Travis Coons kick), 9:20. Broncos 16–14. **Drive: 8 plays, 80 yards, 4:17.**
- CLE – Karlos Dansby 35-yard interception return (pass failed), 8:18. Browns 20–16.
- DEN – Emmanuel Sanders 75-yard pass from Peyton Manning (Brandon McManus kick), 8:02. Broncos 23–20. **Drive: 1 play, 75 yards, 0:14.**
- CLE – Travis Coons 26-yard field goal, 1:32. Tied 23–23. **Drive: 10 plays, 52 yards, 3:21.**

**Overtime**

- DEN – Brandon McManus 34-yard field goal, 4:57. Broncos 26–23. **Drive: 13 plays, 72 yards, 6:42.**

**Top passers**

- DEN – Peyton Manning – 26/48, 290 yards, TD, 3 INT
- CLE – Josh McCown – 20/39, 213 yards, 2 TD, 2 INT

**Top rushers**

- DEN – Ronnie Hillman – 20 rushes, 111 yards
- CLE – Duke Johnson – 9 rushes, 38 yards

**Top receivers**

- DEN – Demaryius Thomas – 10 receptions, 111 yards
- CLE – Travis Benjamin – 9 receptions, 117 yards

**Top tacklers**

- DEN – Danny Trevathan – 7 tackles, 3 assists
- CLE – Pierre Desir – 10 tackles, 2 assists

Coming off five hard-fought victories, the Broncos traveled to FirstEnergy Stadium to face the Cleveland Browns – the Broncos' first visit to Cleveland since 2008. A 29-yard field goal by placekicker Brandon McManus late in the first quarter gave the Broncos an early lead. The Broncos increased their lead to 10–0 early in the second quarter, when cornerback Aqib Talib returned an interception off Browns' quarterback Josh McCown 63 yards for a touchdown. Each team alternated punts for the next five offensive possessions, and the Broncos were attempting to add to their lead just before halftime. However, McManus missed wide-left on a 51-yard field goal attempt.

An 11-yard touchdown pass from McCown to tight end Gary Barnidge got the Browns on the scoreboard on the initial possession of the second half. Later in the third quarter, Broncos' linebacker Shaquil Barrett forced a sack and fumble recovery off McCown on the Browns' side of the field, however, the Broncos had to settle on a 25-yard field goal by McManus. Another field goal by McManus – a 39-yarder early in the fourth quarter, increased the Broncos' lead to 16–7. The Browns responded, with another touchdown pass from McCown to Barnidge – from 14 yards out. On the third play of the Broncos' next drive, a short pass from quarterback Peyton Manning intended for running back Ronnie Hillman was bobbled by Hillman and Browns' linebacker Karlos Dansby intercepted the pass and scampered down the sideline 35 yards for a touchdown. The Broncos' defense denied a two-point conversion pass from McCown to wide receiver Travis Benjamin – even after an offsides penalty on Talib that moved the conversion attempt to the 1-yard line, leaving the Browns with a 20–16 lead.

On the very first play of the Broncos' next drive, Manning threw a 75-yard touchdown pass to wide receiver Emmanuel Sanders to give the Broncos a 23–20 lead with 8:02 remaining in the game. Both teams were forced to punt on their next offensive possessions. With 4:51 remaining, the Browns took possession at their own 40-yard line and were hoping for a go-ahead touchdown after forcing the Broncos to use all three of their team timeouts, but were forced to settle on a game-tying 26-yard field goal by placekicker Travis Coons with 1:41 remaining in the fourth quarter. The Broncos then went three-and-out, and punted the football back to the Browns to their own 40-yard line. The Browns reached the Broncos' 46-yard line in two plays. On the third play, McCown was intercepted by Broncos' safety David Bruton at the Broncos' 30-yard line, giving the Broncos one last possession before the end of regulation. However, they were only able to advance 13 yards, sending the game to overtime.

The Broncos' won the overtime coin toss, but on the fourth play of the initial possession, Manning threw his third interception of the game – this one to Browns' linebacker Barkevious Mingo, who advanced to the Broncos' 39 yards, giving the Browns a chance of a winning field goal. However, the Broncos' defense pushed the Browns' offense back 13 yards in three plays and out of field goal range. After return specialist Jordan Norwood nearly muffed a punt at the Broncos' 12-yard line at the 11:38 mark of overtime, the Broncos assembled a 13-play, 72-yard drive, and with 4:56 left, McManus kicked the game-winning 34-yard field goal.

Notes

The Broncos won their 11th consecutive game against the Browns, dating back to the 1991 season – a streak in which the Browns snapped during the 2018 season. The Broncos improved their all-time series record against the Browns to 23–5 (including the playoffs).

==== Week 8: vs. Green Bay Packers ====
Week Eight: Green Bay Packers at Denver Broncos – Game summary

Quarter	1	2	3	4	Total
Packers	0	7	3	0	**10**
**Broncos**	7	10	7	5	**29**

at Sports Authority Field at Mile High, Denver, Colorado

- Date: November 1
- Game time: 6:30 pm. MST
- Game weather: 61 °F (16 °C), partly cloudy
- Game attendance: 77,075
- Referee: John Parry
- TV announcers (NBC): Al Michaels, Cris Collinsworth and Michele Tafoya
- Recap, Gamebook

Game information

**First quarter**

- DEN – 4:39 Ronnie Hillman 1-yard TD run, Brandon McManus kick. Drive: 9 plays, 83 yards, 4:57. (DEN 7–0)

**Second quarter**

- DEN – 14:02 Ronnie Hillman 15-yard TD run, Brandon McManus kick. Drive: 6 plays, 85 yards, 2:43. (DEN 14–0)
- DEN – 7:46 Brandon McManus 50-yard FG. Drive: 8 plays, 46 yards, 4:12. (DEN 17–0)
- GB – 2:58 Eddie Lacy 2-yard TD run, Mason Crosby kick. Drive: 10 plays, 80 yards, 4:48. (DEN 17–7)

**Third quarter**

- GB – 9:07 Mason Crosby 56-yard FG. Drive: 11 plays, 41 yards, 5:53. (DEN 17–10)
- DEN – 5:25 C. J. Anderson 28-yard TD run, Brandon McManus kick. Drive: 8 plays, 80 yards, 3:42. (DEN 24–10)

**Fourth quarter**

- DEN – 12:25 Brandon McManus 24-yard FG. Drive: 9 plays, 74 yards, 4:45. (DEN 27–10)
- DEN – 12:09 Malik Jackson tackled Richard Rodgers in the end zone for a safety. **(DEN 29–10)**

**Top passers**

- GB – Aaron Rodgers: 14/22, 77 yards
- DEN – Peyton Manning: 21/29, 340 yards, 1 INT

**Top rushers**

- GB – Eddie Lacy: 11 rushes, 38 yards, 1 TD
- DEN – C. J. Anderson: 14 rushes, 101 yards, 1 TD

**Top receivers**

- GB – Randall Cobb: 6 receptions, 27 yards
- DEN – Demaryius Thomas: 8 receptions, 168 yards

**Top tacklers**

- GB – Casey Hayward and Damarious Randall: 6 tackles and 1 assist each (1 interception by Randall)
- DEN – Brandon Marshall: 6 tackles, 1 forced fumble

Coming off their bye week, the Broncos played host to the Green Bay Packers on Sunday Night Football, with both teams entering the game with 6–0 records. The Broncos jumped out to a 17–0 lead, consisting of a pair of touchdown runs by running back Ronnie Hillman – a 1-yarder in the first quarter and a 15-yarder in the second quarter, followed by a 50-yard field goal by placekicker Brandon McManus. The Packers got on the scoreboard late in the second quarter, with running back Eddie Lacy rushing for a 2-yard touchdown. The Packers narrowed the Broncos' lead to 17–10 on the initial possession of the second half, with a 56-yard field goal by placekicker Mason Crosby. The Broncos' defense then held the Packers scoreless for the remainder of the game, and their offense added to their lead, with running back C. J. Anderson rushing for a 28-yard touchdown, followed in the fourth quarter by a 24-yard field goal by McManus. Later, linebacker DeMarcus Ware forced a sack and fumble off Packers' quarterback Aaron Rodgers, resulting in a safety that put the game out of reach.

Notes

Owner Pat Bowlen was inducted into the Broncos' Ring of Fame during halftime. Due to his battle with Alzheimer's disease, Bowlen relinquished control of the team to team president Joe Ellis and executive vice president/general manager John Elway prior to the start of the 2014 season. The Broncos' defense limited Aaron Rodgers to just 77 yards passing – the lowest of Rodgers' career in a game where he wasn't knocked out by injury. The Broncos started 7–0 for only the second time in franchise history, the other time was in 1998, when they started 13–0 and won Super Bowl XXXIII. This was the first of two games in which the Broncos wore their alternate navy blue jerseys – the other game was Week 14 vs. the Oakland Raiders.

==== Week 9: at Indianapolis Colts ====
Week Nine: Denver Broncos at Indianapolis Colts – Game summary

Quarter	1	2	3	4	Total
Broncos	0	7	10	7	**24**
**Colts**	7	10	0	10	**27**

at Lucas Oil Stadium, Indianapolis, Indiana

- Date: November 8
- Game time: 4:25 pm. EST/2:25 pm. MST
- Game weather: 54 °F (12 °C), sunny – retractable roof open
- Game attendance: 66,894
- Referee: Brad Allen
- TV announcers (CBS): Jim Nantz, Phil Simms and Tracy Wolfson
- Recap, Gamebook

Game information

**First quarter**

- IND – 6:48 Frank Gore 7-yard TD run, Adam Vinatieri kick. Drive: 7 plays, 80 yards, 3:42. (IND 7–0)

**Second quarter**

- IND – 12:13 Adam Vinatieri 43-yard FG. Drive: 9 plays, 63 yards, 6:01. (IND 10–0)
- IND – 7:12 Jack Doyle 3-yard TD pass from Andrew Luck, Adam Vinatieri kick. Drive: 8 plays, 63 yards, 3:43. (IND 17–0)
- DEN – 0:00 Omar Bolden 83-yard punt return for a TD, Brandon McManus kick. (IND 17–7)

**Third quarter**

- DEN – 11:27 Emmanuel Sanders 64-yard TD pass from Peyton Manning, Brandon McManus kick. Drive: 3 plays, 60 yards, 1:23. (IND 17–14)
- DEN – 4:57 Brandon McManus 29-yard FG. Drive: 10 plays, 79 yards, 4:40. (tied 17–17)

**Fourth quarter**

- IND – 14:05 Ahmad Bradshaw 8-yard TD pass from Andrew Luck, Adam Vinatieri kick. Drive: 12 plays, 80 yards, 5:52. (IND 24–17)
- DEN – 8:54 Owen Daniels 1-yard TD from Peyton Manning, Brandon McManus kick. Drive: 9 plays, 80 yards, 5:11. (tied 24–24)
- IND – 6:13 Adam Vinatieri 55-yard FG. Drive: 7 plays, 33 yards, 2:41. **(IND 27–24)**

**Top passers**

- DEN – Peyton Manning: 21/36, 281 yards, 2 TD, 2 INT
- IND – Andrew Luck: 21/36, 252 yards, 2 TD

**Top rushers**

- DEN – C. J. Anderson: 7 rushes, 34 yards
- IND – Frank Gore: 28 rushes, 83 yards, 1 TD

**Top receivers**

- DEN – Owen Daniels: 6 receptions, 102 yards, 1 TD
- IND – T. Y. Hilton: 5 receptions, 82 yards

**Top tacklers**

- DEN – T. J. Ward: 10 tackles, 2 assists
- IND – Dwight Lowery: 5 tackles

Coming off their dominating win over the previously unbeaten Packers, the Broncos traveled to Lucas Oil Stadium to face the Indianapolis Colts. A 7-yard touchdown run by running back Frank Gore in the first quarter, followed in the second quarter by a 43-yard field goal by placekicker Adam Vinatieri and a 3-yard touchdown pass from quarterback Andrew Luck to tight end Jack Doyle gave the Colts a 17–0 lead. The latter scoring play occurred after Broncos' quarterback Peyton Manning was intercepted by Colts' safety Mike Adams. The Broncos got on the scoreboard in the closing seconds of the first half, with return specialist Omar Bolden returning a punt 83 yards for a touchdown. The Broncos narrowed the gap on their initial possession of the second half, with Manning throwing a 64-yard touchdown pass to wide receiver Emmanuel Sanders, then tied the game, with a 29-yard field goal by placekicker Brandon McManus. The Colts re-claimed the lead early in the fourth quarter, with an 8-yard touchdown pass from Luck to running back Ahmad Bradshaw. The Broncos responded, with a 1-yard touchdown pass from Manning to tight end Owen Daniels, in what was the final regular-season touchdown pass of Manning's career. Another field goal by Vinatieri – from 55 yards out, gave the Colts a 27–24 lead with 6:18 remaining in the game. On the Broncos' first play of their next possession, Manning was intercepted by Colts' cornerback Darius Butler. The Colts' offense forced the Broncos to use all of their timeouts, and with 28 seconds remaining, Vinatieri kicked a 23-yard field goal. However, the Colts decided not to take the points due to a defensive holding penalty on Broncos' linebacker Danny Trevathan, which enabled Luck to end the game on a quarterback kneel.

==== Week 10: vs. Kansas City Chiefs ====
Week Ten: Kansas City Chiefs at Denver Broncos – Game summary

Quarter	1	2	3	4	Total
**Chiefs**	10	9	3	7	**29**
Broncos	0	0	0	13	**13**

at Sports Authority Field at Mile High, Denver, Colorado

- Date: November 15
- Game time: 2:25 pm. MST
- Game weather: 64 °F (18 °C), mostly sunny
- Game attendance: 76,973
- Referee: Gene Steratore
- TV announcers (CBS): Greg Gumbel, Trent Green and Jamie Erdahl
- Recap, Gamebook

Game information

**First quarter**

- KC – 11:21 Charcandrick West 4-yard TD run, Cairo Santos kick. Drive: 5 plays, 31 yards, 2:36. (KC 7–0)
- KC – 6:19 Cairo Santos 48-yard FG. Drive: 6 plays, 43 yards, 3:52. (KC 10–0)

**Second quarter**

- KC – 11:35 Cairo Santos 49-yard FG. Drive: 8 plays, 19 yards, 3:31. (KC 13–0)
- KC – 3:30 Cairo Santos 34-yard FG. Drive: 4 plays, 8 yards, 1:21. (KC 16–0)
- KC – 0:00 Cairo Santos 33-yard FG. Drive: 12 plays, 46 yards, 2:38. (KC 19–0)

**Third quarter**

- KC – 10:45 Cairo Santos 50-yard FG. Drive: 6 plays, 9 yards, 2:31. (KC 22–0)

**Fourth quarter**

- KC – 11:10 Charcandrick West 80-yard TD pass from Alex Smith, Cairo Santos kick. Drive: 2 plays, 81 yards, 0:53. (KC 29–0)
- DEN – 5:27 Ronnie Hillman 1-yard TD run, two-point run failed. Drive: 12 plays, 80 yards, 5:43. (KC 29–6)
- DEN – 1:45 Andre Caldwell 7-yard TD pass from Brock Osweiler, Brandon McManus kick. Drive: 5 plays, 62 yards, 1:23. **(KC 29–13)**

**Top passers**

- KC – Alex Smith: 17/31, 204 yards, 1 TD
- DEN – Brock Osweiler: 14/24, 146 yards, 1 TD, 1 INT

**Top rushers**

- KC – Charcandrick West: 24 rushes, 69 yards, 1 TD
- DEN – Ronnie Hillman: 11 rushes, 42 yards, 1 TD

**Top receivers**

- KC – Charcandrick West: 3 receptions, 92 yards, 1 TD
- DEN – Demaryius Thomas: 7 receptions, 71 yards

**Top tacklers**

- KC – Derrick Johnson: 6 tackles, 1 assist, 1 sack
- DEN – Brandon Marshall and Darian Stewart: 5 tackles each (3 assists by Marshall, 1 assist by Stewart)

Hoping to rebound from their first loss of the season, the Broncos returned home for an AFC West divisional rematch with the Kansas City Chiefs. After Peyton Manning became the NFL's all-time leader in regular season passing yardage, the game turned sour for the Broncos. Following a Manning interception, the Chiefs capitalized, with a 4-yard touchdown run by running back Charcandrick West. The Broncos' offense went three-and-out on their next two possessions, and the Chiefs increased their lead to 10–0, with a 48-yard field goal by placekicker Cairo Santos. The Chiefs increased their lead to 19–0 at halftime, with three more field goals by Santos – from 49, 34 and 33 yards out. By halftime, Manning had thrown three interceptions and the Broncos' offense had earned only one first down. The Broncos went three-and-out on their first possession of the second half, and a 50-yarder field goal by Santos increased the Chiefs' lead to 22–0. After Manning threw his fourth interception of the game on the Broncos' next possession, he was pulled and replaced by backup quarterback Brock Osweiler for the remainder of the game. Osweiler drove the Broncos' into the red zone early in the fourth quarter, but was intercepted by Chiefs' safety Eric Berry. Two plays later, the Chiefs increased their lead to 29–0, when quarterback Alex Smith connected with West on an 80-yard touchdown pass. The Broncos' finally got on the scoreboard with 5:31 remaining in the game, with running back Ronnie Hillman rushing for a 1-yard touchdown (two-point conversion attempt unsuccessful), followed by a 7-yard touchdown pass from Osweiler to wide receiver Andre Caldwell, but the Chiefs' lead was too much for the Broncos to overcome. Peyton Manning finished the day with the first 0.0 passer rating of his career.

==== Week 11: at Chicago Bears ====
Week Eleven: Denver Broncos at Chicago Bears – Game summary

Quarter	1	2	3	4	Total
**Broncos**	7	3	0	7	**17**
Bears	0	6	3	6	**15**

at Soldier Field, Chicago

- Date: November 22
- Game time: 12:00 pm. CST/11:00 am. MST
- Game weather: 29 °F (−2 °C), sunny
- Game attendance: 62,483
- Referee: Pete Morelli
- TV announcers (CBS): Ian Eagle, Dan Fouts and Evan Washburn
- Recap, Gamebook

Game information

**First quarter**

- DEN – 12:14 Demaryius Thomas 48-yard TD pass from Brock Osweiler, Brandon McManus kick. Drive: 4 plays, 74 yards, 1:34. (DEN 7–0)

**Second quarter**

- CHI – 10:32 Robbie Gould 46-yard FG. Drive: 10 plays, 58 yards, 4;16. (DEN 7–3)
- CHI – 6:13 Robbie Gould 37-yard FG. Drive: 7 plays, 50 yards, 2:57. (DEN 7–6)
- DEN – 0:00 Brandon McManus 24-yard FG. Drive: 13 plays, 82 yards, 3:40. (DEN 10–6)

**Third quarter**

- CHI – 0:49 Robbie Gould 37-yard FG. Drive: 8 plays, 79 yards, 3:33. (DEN 10–9)

**Fourth quarter**

- DEN – 11:42 Cody Latimer 10-yard TD pass from Brock Osweiler, Brandon McManus kick. Drive: 10 plays, 71 yards, 4:07. (DEN 17–9)
- CHI – 0:24 Jeremy Langford 2-yard TD run, two-point run failed. Drive: 6 plays, 65 yards, 1:25. **(DEN 17–15)**

**Top passers**

- DEN – Brock Osweiler: 20/27, 250 yards, 2 TD
- CHI – Jay Cutler: 18/32, 265 yards, 1 INT

**Top rushers**

- DEN – Ronnie Hillman: 21 rushes, 102 yards
- CHI – Ka'deem Carey: 9 rushes, 32 yards

**Top receivers**

- DEN – Owen Daniels: 4 receptions, 69 yards
- CHI – Marquess Wilson: 4 receptions, 102 yards

**Top tacklers**

- DEN – Danny Trevathan and Brandon Marshall: 7 tackles each (1 assist and 1 interception by Trevathan)
- CHI – Adrian Amos and Kyle Fuller: 7 tackles each (1 sack by Amos)

Hoping to rebound from back-to-back losses, the Broncos traveled to Soldier Field to face the Chicago Bears. It was the first start for quarterback Brock Osweiler, substituting for the injured Peyton Manning. The Broncos grabbed the lead on their initial possession, when Osweiler, playing on his 25th birthday, connected with wide receiver Demaryius Thomas on a 48-yard touchdown pass. The Bears got on the scoreboard in the second quarter, with two field goals by placekicker Robbie Gould – from 46 and 37 yards out. The Broncos increased their lead to 10–6, with a 24-yard field goal by placekicker Brandon McManus as time expired in the second half. Midway through the third quarter, Broncos' linebacker Danny Trevathan intercepted a pass by Bears' quarterback Jay Cutler deep in Bears' territory. Six plays later, the Broncos were attempting to add to their lead on a 4th-and-goal, however, the Bears' defense prevailed after running back Ronnie Hillman was inadvertently tripped by Owseiler on the hand off at the 2-yard line. The Bears then marched down the field, and another 37-yard field goal by Gould narrowed the Broncos' lead to 10–9 near the end of the third quarter.

The Broncos then increased their lead to 17–9 early in the fourth quarter, when Osweiler fired a 10-yard touchdown pass to wide receiver Cody Latimer, who was playing in place of the injured Emmanuel Sanders. The Bears once again marched down the field, and were facing a 4th-and-goal from the Broncos' 4-yard line, however, a pass from Cutler to running back Jeremy Langford was broken up by Broncos' cornerback Aqib Talib with ten minutes remaining in the game. The Broncos' offense chewed up six minutes of the clock, but were forced to punt, giving the football back to the Bears with 4:23 remaining. On the sixth play of the Bears' next drive, Broncos' linebacker Von Miller forced a strip sack and fumble off Cutler at the Broncos' 35-yard line, which was recovered by defensive end Malik Jackson with 2:30 remaining. However, the Broncos' offense went three-and-out, though they forced the Bears to burn two of their three team timeouts. Just after the two-minute warning, the Bears marched down the field, and finally got into the end zone with only 29 seconds remaining, with Langford lunging for a 2-yard touchdown run. However, the Broncos' defense denied a two-point conversion running attempt by Langford, which would have tied the game. The Bears' subsequent onside kick was unsuccessful, and the Broncos' offense ran out the clock.

Notes

This was the first game this season in which the Broncos' offense did not commit any turnovers. This was Bears' head coach John Fox's first game against the Broncos since mutually parting ways with the Broncos following the end of the 2014 season. It also marked Jay Cutler's first game against the Broncos, who drafted Cutler in the first round of the 2006 draft before he was traded to the Bears prior to the 2009 season. Cutler did not play when the Broncos and Bears last faced each in other in 2011 due to a thumb injury.

==== Week 12: vs. New England Patriots ====
Week Twelve: New England Patriots at Denver Broncos – Game summary

Quarter	1	2	3	4	OT	Total
Patriots	7	7	0	10	0	**24**
**Broncos**	0	7	0	17	6	**30**

at Sports Authority Field at Mile High, Denver, Colorado

- Date: November 29
- Game time: 6:30 pm. MST
- Game weather: 23 °F (−5 °C), cloudy with light snow
- Game attendance: 76,970
- Referee: Tony Corrente
- TV announcers (NBC): Al Michaels, Cris Collinsworth and Michele Tafoya
- Recap, Gamebook

Game information

**First quarter**

- NE – 11:24 Rob Gronkowski 23-yard TD pass from Tom Brady, Stephen Gostkowski kick. Drive: 4 plays, 47 yards, 2:03. (NE 7–0)

**Second quarter**

- NE – 10:40 Scott Chandler 9-yard TD pass from Tom Brady, Stephen Gostkowski kick. Drive: 3 plays, 15 yards, 1:32. (NE 14–0)
- DEN – 2:07 Ronnie Hillman 19-yard TD run, Brandon McManus kick. Drive: 10 plays, 77 yards, 5:41. (NE 14–7)

**Third quarter**

- No scoring plays

**Fourth quarter**

- NE – 14:50 Brandon Bolden 63-yard TD pass from Tom Brady, Stephen Gostkowski kick. Drive: 3 plays, 65 yards, 0:17. (NE 21–7)
- DEN – 12:34 C. J. Anderson 15-yard TD run, Brandon McManus kick. Drive: 4 plays, 36 yards, 1:41, (NE 21–14)
- DEN – 6:08 Brandon McManus 21-yard FG. Drive: 9 plays, 52 yards, 4:50. (NE 21–17)
- DEN – 1:09 Andre Caldwell 4-yard TD pass from Brock Osweiler, Brandon McManus kick. Drive: 5 plays, 83 yards, 1:22. (DEN 24–21)
- NE – 0:00 Stephen Gostkowski 47-yard FG. Drive: 5 plays, 51 yards, 1:09. (tied 24–24)

**Overtime**

- DEN – 12:32 C. J. Anderson 48-yard TD run. Drive: 3 plays, 57 yards, 1:19. **(DEN 30–24)**

**Top passers**

- NE – Tom Brady: 23/42, 280 yards, 3 TD
- DEN – Brock Osweiler: 23/42, 270 yards, 1 TD, 1 INT

**Top rushers**

- NE – LeGarrette Blount: 9 rushes, 27 yards
- DEN – C. J. Anderson: 15 rushes, 113 yards, 2 TD

**Top receivers**

- NE – Rob Gronkowski: 6 receptions, 88 yards, 1 TD
- DEN – Emmanuel Sanders: 6 receptions, 113 yards

**Top tacklers**

- NE – Jonathan Freeny and Malcolm Butler: 7 tackles each (5 assists and 1 sack by Freeny)
- DEN – Derek Wolfe: 6 tackles, 2 assists, 1 sack

Coming off their win over the Bears, the Broncos returned home for an AFC duel with the New England Patriots on NBC's Sunday Night Football, on a snowy night in Denver. The Patriots, who entered the game with a 10–0 record, jumped out to a 14–0 lead, with quarterback Tom Brady tossing two touchdown passes – a 23-yarder to tight end Rob Gronkowski, followed in the second quarter by a 10-yarder to tight end Scott Chandler. The latter score occurred after Broncos' quarterback Brock Osweiler had a pass deflected and intercepted deep in Broncos' territory. The Broncos got on the scoreboard just before the two-minute warning, with running back Ronnie Hillman rushing for a 19-yard touchdown.

The Broncos had a chance to cut into the Patriots' lead on their first possession of the second half, however, placekicker Brandon McManus missed wide-right on a 47-yard field goal attempt. Each team proceeded to trade punts on their next two offensive possessions, until Brady connected with wide receiver Brandon Bolden on a 63-yard touchdown pass at the beginning of the fourth quarter to give the Patriots a 21–7 lead. The Broncos' offense went three-and-out, and were forced to punt. However, Patriots' return specialist Chris Harper muffed the punt, which was recovered by Shaquil Barrett at the Patriots' 36-yard line, giving the Broncos new life. Four plays later, the Broncos pulled to within a one-touchdown deficit, with a 15-yard touchdown run by running back C. J. Anderson. The Broncos' defense forced a punt on the Patriots' next possession, which was aided by an offensive holding penalty on guard Tre' Jackson that nullified a 51-yard pass completion from Brady to wide receiver Keshawn Martin on a third-and-long play. The Broncos then marched down the field, but had to settle for a 21-yard field goal by McManus to pull to within 21–17 with 6:12 remaining in the fourth quarter. The two teams traded punts on their next possessions, and with 2:39 remaining and no timeouts, the Broncos forced a Patriots' punt. The Broncos marched down the field and were facing a 2nd-and-goal from the Patriots' 7-yard line, when Osweiler was sacked for an eight-yard loss. However, the sack was nullified by a defensive holding penalty on Patriots' safety Patrick Chung. On the very next play, the Broncos grabbed their first lead of the game, when Osweiler connected with wide receiver Andre Caldwell on a 4-yard touchdown with 1:15 remaining in the fourth quarter.

The Patriots were not done yet, as Brady engineered a 5-play, 51-yard drive, which culminated with placekicker Stephen Gostkowski kicking a game-tying 47-yard field goal as time expired, sending the game to overtime. The Patriots won the overtime coin toss, but their offense went three-and-out. Following a Patriots' punt, the Broncos started their first overtime drive at their own 43-yard line, and three plays later, Anderson scampered down the sideline for a game-winning 48-yard touchdown run.

==== Week 13: at San Diego Chargers ====
Week Thirteen: Denver Broncos at San Diego Chargers – Game summary

Quarter	1	2	3	4	Total
**Broncos**	14	3	0	0	**17**
Chargers	0	3	0	0	**3**

at Qualcomm Stadium, San Diego, California

- Date: December 6
- Game time: 2:05 pm. MST/1:05 pm. PST
- Game weather: 78 °F (26 °C), sunny
- Game attendance: 68,631
- Referee: Walt Coleman
- TV announcers (CBS): Kevin Harlan, Rich Gannon and Scott Kaplan
- Recap, Gamebook

Game information

**First quarter**

- DEN – 11:15 Demaryius Thomas 3-yard TD pass from Brock Osweiler, Brandon McManus kick. Drive: 8 plays, 76 yards, 3:45. (DEN 7–0)
- DEN – 0:04 Danny Trevathan 25-yard interception return for a TD, Brandon McManus kick. (DEN 14–0)

**Second quarter**

- DEN – 5:26 Brandon McManus 23-yard FG. Drive: 14 plays, 46 yards, 7:18. (DEN 17–0)
- SD – 1:41 Josh Lambo 51-yard FG. Drive: 9 plays, 47 yards, 3:45. **(DEN 17–3)**

**Third quarter**

- No scoring plays

**Fourth quarter**

- No scoring plays

**Top passers**

- DEN – Brock Osweiler: 16/26, 166 yards, 1 TD, 1 INT
- SD – Philip Rivers: 18/35, 202 yards, 1 INT

**Top rushers**

- DEN – Ronnie Hillman: 19 rushes, 56 yards
- SD – Melvin Gordon: 12 rushes, 55 yards

**Top receivers**

- DEN – Demaryius Thomas: 6 receptions, 61 yards, 1 TD
- SD – Antonio Gates: 6 receptions, 50 yards

**Top tacklers**

- DEN – David Bruton: 9 tackles, 3 assists
- SD – Denzel Perryman: 10 tackles

Coming off their overtime win over the Patriots, the Broncos traveled to Qualcomm Stadium for their first of two matches with their AFC West division rivals, the San Diego Chargers. On the Broncos' opening drive, quarterback Brock Osweiler connected with wide receiver Demaryius Thomas on a 3-yard touchdown pass. The Chargers had a chance to get on the scoreboard midway through the first quarter, but placekicker Josh Lambo missed wide-right on a 48-yard field goal attempt. Toward the end of the first quarter, the Broncos added to the lead, when linebacker Danny Trevathan intercepted an errant pass by Chargers' quarterback Philip Rivers and returned it for a 25-yard touchdown. After forcing a Chargers' punt early in the second quarter, the Broncos marched down the field with a long drive that chewed up seven minutes, but had to settle for a 23-yard field goal by placekicker Brandon McManus that increased their lead to 17–0. The Chargers got on the scoreboard just after the two-minute warning, with a 51-yard field goal by Lambo, which would be the final scoring play of the game by either team. In the third quarter, the Broncos' defense recovered two forced fumbles, while on offense, McManus missed wide right on a 52-yard field goal attempt and Osweiler threw an interception deep in Chargers' territory. In the fourth quarter, the Broncos' offense punted on all of their possessions (save the final kneel down), while their defense did not allow the Chargers' offense to advance past their own 47-yard line.

Notes

The Broncos swept their division rivals on the road for the sixth time in seven seasons.

==== Week 14: vs. Oakland Raiders ====
Week Fourteen: Oakland Raiders at Denver Broncos – Game summary

Quarter	1	2	3	4	Total
**Raiders**	0	0	9	6	**15**
Broncos	6	6	0	0	**12**

at Sports Authority Field at Mile High, Denver, Colorado

- Date: December 13
- Game time: 2:05 pm. MST
- Game weather: 45 °F (7 °C), partly cloudy
- Game attendance: 76,824
- Referee: Bill Vinovich
- TV announcers (CBS): Ian Eagle, Dan Fouts and Evan Washburn
- Recap, Gamebook

Game information

**First quarter**

- DEN – 9:42 Brandon McManus 41-yard FG. Drive: 10 plays, 57 yards, 5:18. (DEN 3–0)
- DEN – 2:05 Brandon McManus 35-yard FG. Drive: 9 plays, 61 yards, 4:26. (DEN 6–0)

**Second quarter**

- DEN – 4:29 Brandon McManus 29-yard FG. Drive: 15 plays, 63 yards, 8:37. (DEN 9–0)
- DEN – 0:04 Brandon McManus 20-yard FG. Drive: 12 plays, 61 yards, 3:32. (DEN 12–0)

**Third quarter**

- OAK – 9:47 Seth Roberts 11-yard TD pass from Derek Carr, Sebastian Janikowski kick. Drive: 9 plays, 80 yards, 5:13. (DEN 12–7)
- OAK – 1:50 Benson Mayowa tackled Max Garcia in the end zone for a safety. (DEN 12–9)

**Fourth quarter**

- OAK – 14:26 Mychal Rivera 16-yard TD pass from Derek Carr, two-point pass failed. Drive: 3 plays, 11 yards, 0:16. **(OAK 15–12)**

**Top passers**

- OAK – Derek Carr: 12/29, 135 yards, 2 TD
- DEN – Brock Osweiler: 35/51, 308 yards

**Top rushers**

- OAK – Latavius Murray: 16 rushes, 27 yards
- DEN – Ronnie Hillman: 12 rushes, 20 yards

**Top receivers**

- OAK – Mychal Rivera: 3 receptions, 49 yards, 1 TD
- DEN – Demaryius Thomas: 10 receptions, 95 yards

**Top tacklers**

- OAK – Curtis Lofton: 8 tackles
- DEN – Chris Harris, Jr. and Todd Davis: 4 tackles rach

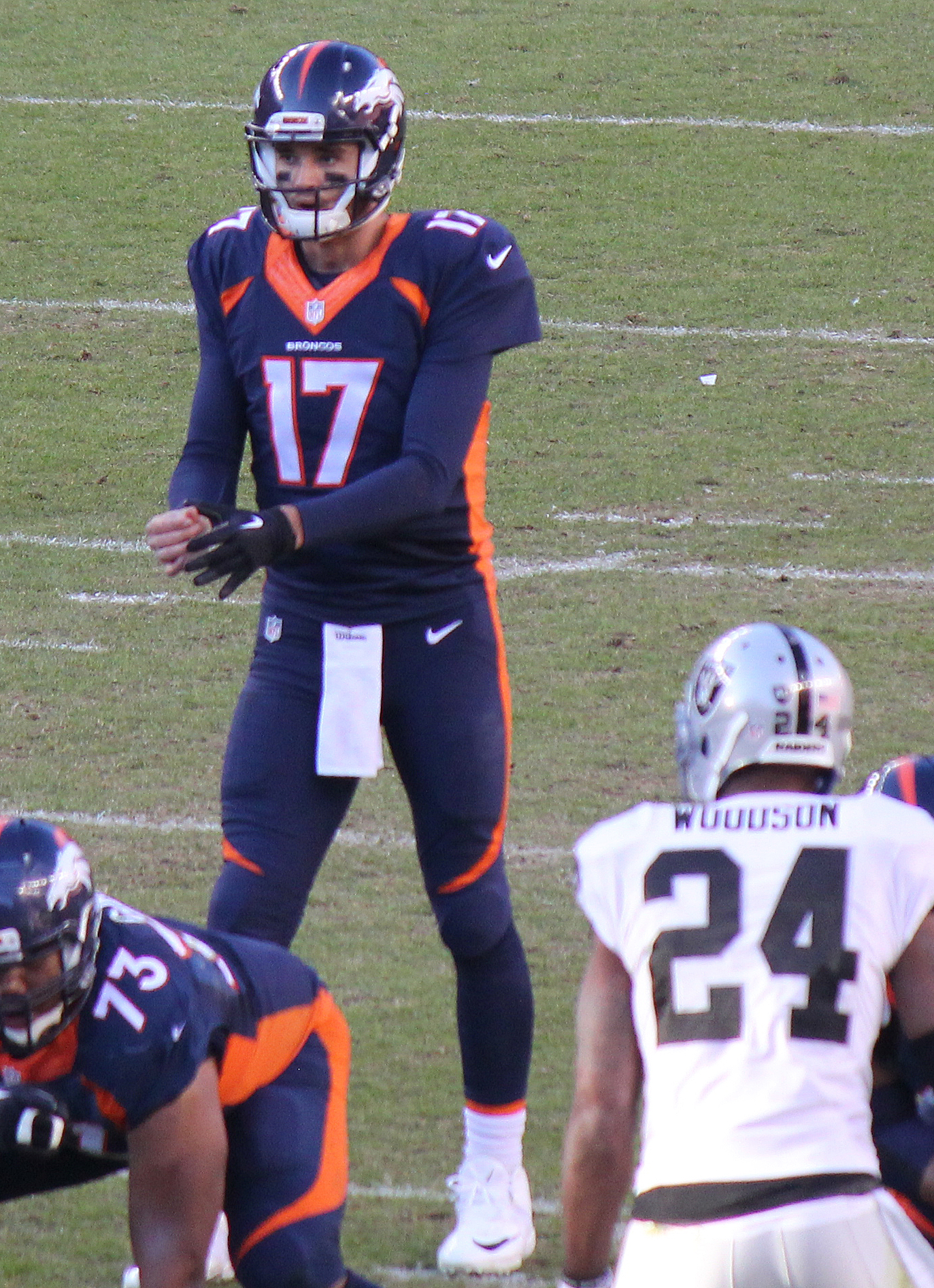
Brock Osweiler during the game

Coming off their win over the Chargers, the Broncos returned home for an AFC West rematch against the Oakland Raiders. In the first half, the Broncos' defense held the Raiders' offense to −12 net yards of offense, and the Broncos' offense dominated the time of possession by a nearly 3–1 margin, but had to settle for four field goals by placekicker Brandon McManus – from 41 and 35 yards in the first quarter, and 29 and 20 yards in the second quarter. The latter field goal occurred after wide receiver Demaryius Thomas dropped a crucial pass in the end zone from quarterback Brock Osweiler with only four seconds before halftime.

The Raiders got on the scoreboard on the initial possession of the second half, with quarterback Derek Carr connecting with wide receiver Seth Roberts on an 11-yard touchdown pass. Later in the third quarter, the Broncos were backed up to their own 2-yard line following a Raiders' punt, and three plays later, the Raiders pulled to within 12–9, when defensive end Khalil Mack forced a fumble off Osweiler in the end zone for a safety. The Broncos' forced another Raiders' punt, however, at the beginning of the fourth quarter, Emmanuel Sanders muffed a punt deep in Broncos' territory, and the Raiders capitalized three plays later, with Carr throwing a 16-yard touchdown pass to tight end Mychal Rivera (with an unsuccessful two-point conversion attempt). The Broncos drove down the field on their next offensive possession, but McManus missed on a 49-yard field goal attempt that hit the left upright. After each team traded punts, the Raiders were attempting to add to their lead, but placekicker Sebastian Janikowski missed wide left on a 43-yard field goal attempt with 5:27 remaining in the game. The Broncos were facing a 4th-and-5 at their own 38-yard line with 3:50 remaining in the game, but tight end Vernon Davis dropped a pass from Osweiler that would have been a first down. The Broncos' defense forced the Raiders to go three-and-out, while being forced to use two of their remaining three team timeouts. With 2:35 remaining, the Broncos had one last possession, but on the sixth play, another dropped 4th-down pass – this one by Thomas – sealed the Raiders' win.

Notes

The Broncos wore their alternate navy blue jerseys for this game.

==== Week 15: at Pittsburgh Steelers ====
Week Fifteen: Denver Broncos at Pittsburgh Steelers – Game summary

Quarter	1	2	3	4	Total
Broncos	14	13	0	0	**27**
**Steelers**	7	6	7	14	**34**

at Heinz Field, Pittsburgh, Pennsylvania

- Date: December 20
- Game time: 4:25 pm. EST/2:25 pm. MST
- Game weather: 41 °F (5 °C), partly cloudy
- Game attendance: 67,234
- Referee: Carl Cheffers
- TV announcers (CBS): Jim Nantz, Phil Simms and Tracy Wolfson
- Recap, Gamebook

Game information

**First quarter**

- PIT – 10:16 DeAngelo Williams 2-yard TD run, Chris Boswell kick. Drive: 2 plays, 21 yards, 0:53. (PIT 7–0)
- DEN – 4:41 Demaryius Thomas 18-yard TD pass from Brock Osweiler, Brandon McManus kick. Drive: 12 plays, 85 yards, 5:35. (tied 7–7)
- DEN – 3:08 Emmanuel Sanders 61-yard TD pass from Brock Osweiler, Brandon McManus kick. Drive: 1 play, 61 yards, 0:08. (DEN 14–7)

**Second quarter**

- DEN – 11:30 Brock Osweiler 7-yard TD run, extra-point failed, wide right. Drive: 10 plays, 50 yards, 4:52. (DEN 20–7)
- PIT – 7:33 Chris Boswell 24-yard FG. Drive: 12 plays, 73 yards, 3:57. (DEN 20–10)
- DEN – 1:56 Demaryius Thomas 6-yard TD pass from Brock Osweiler, Brandon McManus kick. Drive: 10 plays, 80 yards, 5:37. (DEN 27–10)
- PIT – 0:04 Chris Boswell 41-yard FG. Drive: 10 plays, 51 yards, 1:52. (DEN 27–13)

**Third quarter**

- PIT – 7:16 Antonio Brown 9-yard TD pass from Ben Roethlisberger, Chris Boswell kick. Drive: 7 plays, 58 yards, 3:17. (DEN 27–20)

**Fourth quarter**

- PIT – 12:34 Markus Wheaton 9-yard TD pass from Ben Roethlisberger, Chris Boswell kick. Drive: 5 plays, 60 yards, 2:17. (tied 27–27)
- PIT – 3:24 Antonio Brown 23-yard TD pass from Ben Roethlisberger, Chris Boswell kick. Drive: 3 plays, 37 yards, 0:56. **(PIT 34–27)**

**Top passers**

- DEN – Brock Osweiler: 21/44, 296 yards, 3 TD, 1 INT
- PIT – Ben Roethlisberger: 40/55, 380 yards, 3 TD, 2 INT

**Top rushers**

- DEN – Ronnie Hillman: 14 rushes, 48 yards
- PIT – DeAngelo Williams: 14 rushes, 26 yards, 1 TD

**Top receivers**

- DEN – Emmanuel Sanders: 10 receptions, 181 yards, 1 TD
- PIT – Antonio Brown: 16 receptions, 189 yards, 2 TD

**Top tacklers**

- DEN – Aqib Talib: 8 tackles
- PIT – Will Allen and Mike Mitchell: 5 tackles, 1 assist (1 forced fumble by Allen)

Hoping to rebound from their loss to the Raiders, the Broncos traveled to Heinz Field to face the Pittsburgh Steelers. On the Broncos' first offensive possession, running back Ronnie Hillman committed a fumble deep in their own territory, and the Steelers capitalized two plays later, with a 2-yard touchdown run by running back DeAngelo Williams. The Broncos reeled off 20 unanswered points, with quarterback Brock Osweiler throwing a pair of touchdown passes – an 18-yarder to wide receiver Demaryius Thomas and a 61-yarder to wide receiver Emmanuel Sanders, followed in the second quarter by Osweiler scrambling for a 7-yard touchdown. The latter score came after the Broncos' defense intercepted Steelers' quarterback Ben Roethlisberger, and also had a missed extra-point attempt by placekicker Brandon McManus. The Steelers then marched down the field, but had to settle for a 24-yard field goal by placekicker Chris Boswell. The Broncos then increased their lead to 27–10, with Osweiler connecting with Thomas on a 6-yard touchdown pass at the 2-minute warning. However, it would be the Broncos' final scoring play of the game, as the offense was shut out in the second half for the third consecutive week. The Steelers pulled to within 27–13, with Boswell kicking a 41-yard field goal just before halftime.

Midway through the third quarter, Roethlisberger connected with wide receiver Antonio Brown on a 9-yard touchdown. Later in the third quarter, Broncos' return specialist Jordan Norwood returned a punt 71 yards for a touchdown; however, the touchdown was nullified by an illegal substitution penalty. Following a Broncos' three-and-out, the Steelers tied the game early in the fourth quarter, with Roethlisberger throwing a 9-yard touchdown pass to wide receiver Markus Wheaton. Each team proceeded to trade punt on their next two possessions, and with just over five minutes remaining, Osweiler was intercepted by Steelers' linebacker Ryan Shazier at the Broncos' 37-yard line, and three plays later, the Steelers re-claimed the lead, with a 23-yard touchdown pass from Roethlisberger to Brown. The Broncos then marched down to the Steelers' 36-yard line with 2:17 remaining, but turned the football over on downs. Just before the two-minute warning, the Steelers were attempting to run out the clock, however, Roethlisberger chose to pass the football, and was intercepted by linebacker Brandon Marshall just before the two-minute warning, giving the Broncos one last possession. However, Osweiler threw four straight incompletions, and the Steelers ran out the clock.

==== Week 16: vs. Cincinnati Bengals ====
Week Sixteen: Cincinnati Bengals at Denver Broncos – Game summary

Quarter	1	2	3	4	OT	Total
Bengals	7	7	0	3	0	**17**
**Broncos**	0	3	7	7	3	**20**

at Sports Authority Field at Mile High, Denver, Colorado

- Date: December 28
- Game time: 6:30 pm. MST
- Game weather: 16 °F (−9 °C), mostly cloudy
- Game attendance: 76,868
- Referee: Ed Hochuli
- TV announcers (ESPN): Mike Tirico, Jon Gruden and Lisa Salters
- Recap, Gamebook

Game information

**First quarter**

- CIN – 7:26 A. J. Green 5-yard TD pass from A. J. McCarron, Mike Nugent kick. Drive: 15 plays, 80 yards, 7:34. (CIN 7–0)

**Second quarter**

- CIN – 10:51 Mohamed Sanu 6-yard TD run, Mike Nugent kick. Drive: 13 plays, 90 yards, 7:50. (CIN 14–0)
- DEN – 0:14 Brandon McManus 23-yard FG. Drive: 7 plays, 60 yards, 2:12. (CIN 14–3)

**Third quarter**

- DEN – 10:14 Emmanuel Sanders 8-yard TD pass from Brock Osweiler, Brandon McManus kick. Drive: 11 plays, 81 yards, 4:46. (CIN 14–10)

**Fourth quarter**

- DEN – 11:17 C. J. Anderson 39-yard TD run, Brandon McManus kick. Drive: 2 plays, 52 yards, 0:34. (DEN 17–14)
- CIN – 6:46 Mike Nugent 52-yard FG. Drive: 11 plays, 46 yards, 4:31. (tied 17–17)

**Overtime**

- DEN – 10:00 Brandon McManus 37-yard FG. Drive: 14 plays, 61 yards, 5:00. **(DEN 20–17)**

**Top passers**

- CIN – A. J. McCarron: 22/35, 200 yards, 1 TD
- DEN – Brock Osweiler: 27/39, 299 yards, 1 TD

**Top rushers**

- CIN – Jeremy Hill: 19 rushes, 63 yards
- DEN – C. J. Anderson: 9 rushes, 73 yards, 1 TD

**Top receivers**

- CIN – A. J. Green: 5 receptions, 57 yards, 1 TD
- DEN – Owen Daniels: 5 receptions, 70 yards

**Top tacklers**

- CIN – Dre Kirkpatrick: 7 tackles
- DEN – Danny Trevathan: 8 tackles, 4 assists

Hoping to avoid their first three-game losing streak since 2011, the Broncos played host to the Cincinnati Bengals on Monday Night Football. The Bengals dominated the first half time of possession by more than a 2–1 margin. The Bengals took the opening possession of the game and marched down the field, with quarterback A. J. McCarron, playing in place of the injured Andy Dalton, throwing a 5-yard touchdown pass to wide receiver A. J. Green in the corner of the end zone. The Bengals later added to their lead in the second quarter, with wide receiver Mohamed Sanu rushing for a 6-yard touchdown, in a "wildcat" formation. The Bengals were threatening to add to their lead just before the two-minute warning, but placekicker Mike Nugent missed wide right on a 45-yard field goal attempt. The Broncos then marched down the field, but had to settle for a 23-yard field goal by placekicker Brandon McManus just before halftime.

The Broncos took the initial possession of the second half, and pulled to within 14–10, with quarterback Brock Osweiler connecting with wide receiver Emmanuel Sanders on an 8-yard touchdown pass, which was the only scoring play of the third quarter. After having trouble stopping the Bengals' offense in the first half, the Broncos' defense forced the Bengals to punt on their first four possessions of the second half. The Broncos grabbed a 17–14 lead early in the fourth quarter, with running back C. J. Anderson scampering down the sideline for a 39-yard touchdown. A 52-yard field goal by Nugent helped the Bengals tie the game at 17–17 with 6:51 remaining in the fourth quarter. The Broncos had reached the Bengals' 27-yard line on the next possession, and were attempting a game-winning drive, but Bengals' defensive end Michael Johnson forced a fumble off Anderson, which was recovered by safety Reggie Nelson. However, the Broncos' defense forced a Bengals' punt, and the Broncos' offense began their next drive at their own 20-yard line with 1:40 remaining. However, McManus badly missed wide left on a potential game-winning 45-yard field goal attempt as time expired, sending the game to overtime.

The Broncos won the overtime coin toss, and took a 20–17 lead on their initial possession, with a 37-yard field goal by McManus. The drive was aided by a 15-yard personal foul penalty on Bengals' linebacker Vontaze Burfict for a late hit out-of-bounds. The Bengals started their first offensive possession of overtime at their own 33-yard line, and on their first play, McCarron attempted a pass that was incomplete, as his arm was hit by Broncos' linebacker Von Miller. Broncos' head coach Gary Kubiak called a timeout, thinking the play should have been ruled as a game-ending fumble, however, the initial ruling was upheld by instant replay. On the very next play, McCarron fumbled the snap, which was recovered by Broncos' linebacker DeMarcus Ware to end the game and send the Broncos to the postseason for the fifth consecutive season.

Notes

This was the third game of the season that the Broncos won after trailing 14–0 – the other two were Week 2 at the Kansas City Chiefs and Week 12 vs. the New England Patriots.

==== Week 17: vs. San Diego Chargers ====
Week Seventeen: San Diego Chargers at Denver Broncos – Game summary

Quarter	1	2	3	4	Total
Chargers	3	3	7	7	**20**
**Broncos**	7	0	7	13	**27**

at Sports Authority Field at Mile High, Denver, Colorado

- Date: January 3, 2016
- Game time: 2:25 pm. MST
- Game weather: 50 °F (10 °C), mostly sunny
- Game attendance: 76,844
- Referee: Ron Torbert
- TV announcers (CBS): Jim Nantz, Phil Simms and Tracy Wolfson
- Recap, Gamebook

Game information

**First quarter**

- DEN – 14:29 Demaryius Thomas 72-yard TD pass from Brock Osweiler, Brandon McManus kick. Drive: 2 plays, 80 yards, 0:31. (DEN 7–0)
- SD – 10:10 Josh Lambo 50-yard FG. Drive: 10 plays, 48 yards, 4:19. (DEN 7–3)

**Second quarter**

- SD – 5:52 Josh Lambo 42-yard FG. Drive: 4 plays, 4 yards, 0:58. (DEN 7–6)

**Third quarter**

- SD – 8:18 Antonio Gates 13-yard TD pass from Philip Rivers, Josh Lambo kick. Drive: 5 plays, 32 yards, 3:05. (SD 13–7)
- DEN – 5:24 C. J. Anderson 1-yard TD run, Brandon McManus kick. Drive: 8 plays, 80 yards, 2:54. (DEN 14–13)

**Fourth quarter**

- DEN – 13:09 Brandon McManus 48-yard FG. Drive: 7 plays, 32 yards, 2:20. (DEN 17–13)
- SD – 12:58 Tyrell Williams 80-yard TD pass from Philip Rivers, Josh Lambo kick. Drive: 1 play, 80 yards, 0:11. (SD 20–17)
- DEN – 9:45 Brandon McManus 35-yard FG. Drive: 7 plays, 63 yards, 3:13. (tied 20–20)
- DEN – 4:44 Ronnie Hillman 23-yard TD run, Brandon McManus kick. Drive: 1 play, 23 yards, 0:06. **(DEN 27–20)**

**Top passers**

- SD – Philip Rivers: 21/35, 228 yards, 2 TD, 1 INT
- DEN – Brock Osweiler: 14/22, 232 yards, 1 TD, 2 INT

**Top rushers**

- SD – Donald Brown: 21 rushes, 81 yards
- DEN – Ronnie Hillman: 15 rushes, 117 yards

**Top receivers**

- SD – Tyrell Williams: 2 receptions, 90 yards, 1 TD
- DEN – Demaryius Thomas: 5 receptions, 117 yards, 1 TD

**Top tacklers**

- SD – Manti Te'o: 7 tackles, 2 assists, 1 forced fumble
- DEN – Danny Trevathan: 8 tackles, 2 assists

The Broncos regular-season finale was an AFC West divisional rematch against the San Diego Chargers. On the second play of the game, quarterback Brock Osweiler completed a pass to Demaryius Thomas for a 72-yard touchdown pass. The Chargers scored on their first offensive possession, with a 50-yard field goal by placekicker Josh Lambo. The Broncos' offense turned the football over on four of their next five possessions, including two fumbles and two interceptions. Lambo added a 42-yard field goal later in the second quarter to pull the Chargers to within 7–6. On the Broncos first possession of the second half, C. J. Anderson fumbled the ball for the second consecutive game, leading to quarterback Philip Rivers completing a pass to tight end Antonio Gates for a 13-yard touchdown. On the Broncos' next offensive possession, Peyton Manning took over for Osweiler at quarterback – Manning's first time playing since Week 10 – and the Broncos re-claimed the lead with a 1-yard touchdown run by Anderson. The Broncos then added to their lead early in the fourth quarter, with a 48-yard field goal by placekicker Brandon McManus. However, the Chargers grabbed a 20–17 lead on their next offensive play, with Rivers throwing an 80-yard touchdown pass to wide receiver Tyrell Williams. A 35-yard field goal by McManus tied the game at 20–20 with 9:48 remaining in the game. After the two teams proceeded to traded punts, Rivers was intercepted by Broncos' safety Shiloh Keo, and the Broncos immediately capitalized, with running back Ronnie Hillman rushing for a 23-yard touchdown to give the Broncos a 27–20 lead with 4:50 remaining in the game. The Chargers' offense attempted a rally, and advanced to as far as the Broncos' 40-yard line, but turned the football over on downs just after the two-minute warning. The Broncos ran out the clock.

With the win, coupled with the New England Patriots' loss to the Miami Dolphins earlier in the day, the Broncos clinched the AFC's No. 1 seed – the Broncos, Patriots and Bengals finished tied for the AFC's best record at 12–4, however, the Broncos claimed the No. 1 seed based on head-to-head sweep. This marked the last time Denver clinched the AFC West until 2025.

=== Standings ===
==== Division ====
AFC West
	W	L	T	PCT	DIV	CONF	PF	PA	STK
^{(1)} Denver Broncos	12	4	0	.750	4–2	8–4	355	296	W2
^{(5)} Kansas City Chiefs	11	5	0	.688	5–1	10–2	405	287	W10
Oakland Raiders	7	9	0	.438	3–3	7–5	359	399	L1
San Diego Chargers	4	12	0	.250	0–6	3–9	320	398	L2

==== Conference ====
AFC
#	Team	Division	W	L	T	PCT	DIV	CONF	SOS	SOV	STK
**Division Leaders**
1 (Note: Denver finished ahead of New England and Cincinnati for the No. 1 seed based on head-to-head sweep. New England finished ahead of Cincinnati for the No. 2 seed based on record vs. common opponents — New England's cumulative record against Buffalo, Denver, Houston and Pittsburgh was 4–1, while Cincinnati's cumulative record against the same four teams was 2–3.)	Denver Broncos	West	12	4	0	.750	4–2	8–4	.500	.479	W2
2	New England Patriots	East	12	4	0	.750	4–2	9–3	.473	.448	L2
3	Cincinnati Bengals	North	12	4	0	.750	5–1	9–3	.477	.406	W1
4	Houston Texans	South	9	7	0	.563	5–1	7–5	.496	.410	W3
**Wild Cards**
5	Kansas City Chiefs	West	11	5	0	.688	5–1	10–2	.496	.432	W10
6 (Note: Pittsburgh finished ahead of the New York Jets for the No. 6 seed and qualified for the last playoff spot based on record vs. common opponents — Pittsburgh's cumulative record against Cleveland, Indianapolis, New England and Oakland was 4–1, while the Jets' cumulative record against the same four teams was 3–2.)	Pittsburgh Steelers	North	10	6	0	.625	3–3	7–5	.504	.463	W1
**Did not qualify for the postseason**
7	New York Jets	East	10	6	0	.625	3–3	7–5	.441	.388	L1
8 (Note: Buffalo finished ahead of Indianapolis based on head-to-head victory.)	Buffalo Bills	East	8	8	0	.500	4–2	7–5	.508	.438	W2
9	Indianapolis Colts	South	8	8	0	.500	4–2	6–6	.500	.406	W2
10	Oakland Raiders	West	7	9	0	.438	3–3	7–5	.512	.366	L1
11	Miami Dolphins	East	6	10	0	.375	1–5	4–8	.469	.469	W2
12 (Note: Jacksonville finished ahead of Baltimore based on head-to-head victory.)	Jacksonville Jaguars	South	5	11	0	.313	2–4	5–7	.473	.375	L3
13	Baltimore Ravens	North	5	11	0	.313	3–3	4–8	.508	.425	L1
14	San Diego Chargers	West	4	12	0	.250	0–6	3–9	.527	.328	L2
15 (Note: Cleveland finished ahead of Tennessee based on head-to-head victory.)	Cleveland Browns	North	3	13	0	.188	1–5	2–10	.531	.271	L3
16	Tennessee Titans	South	3	13	0	.188	1–5	1–11	.492	.375	L4
**Tiebreakers** (Note: When breaking ties for three or more teams under the NFL's rules, they are first broken within divisions, then comparing only the highest ranked remaining team from each division.)

=== Statistics ===
==== Team leaders ====
Category	Player(s)	Value
Passing yards	Peyton Manning	2,249
Passing touchdowns	Brock Osweiler	10
Rushing yards	Ronnie Hillman	863
Rushing touchdowns	Ronnie Hillman	7
Receptions	Demaryius Thomas	105
Receiving yards	Demaryius Thomas	1,304
Receiving touchdowns	Demaryius Thomas; Emmanuel Sanders	6
Points	Brandon McManus	125
Kickoff return yards	Omar Bolden	342
Punt return yards	Omar Bolden	123
Tackles	Danny Trevathan	110
Sacks	Von Miller	11
Forced fumbles	Shaquil Barrett; Von Miller	4
Interceptions	Aqib Talib	3

Source for this section: Denver Broncos' official website.

==== League rankings ====
Offense
Category	Value	NFL rank (out of 32)
Total yards	355.5 YPG	16th
Yards per play	5.4	19th
Rushing yards	107.4 YPG	17th
Yards per rush	4.2	12th
Passing yards	248.1 YPG	14th
Yards per pass	7	22nd
Scoring	22.2 PPG	19th
Pass completions	368/606 (.607)	24th
Third downs	79/224 (.353)	25th
Possession average	30:30	19th
Fewest sacks allowed	39	20th
Turnover differential	−4	T–19th

Defense
Category	Value	NFL rank (out of 32)
Total yards	283.1 YPG	1st
Yards per play	4.4	1st
Rushing yards	83.6 YPG	3rd
Yards per rush	3.3	1st
Passing yards	199.6 YPG	1st
Yards per pass	6.2	2nd
Scoring	18.5 PPG	4th
Pass completions	344/573 (.600)	8th
Third downs	80/227 (.352)	7th
Sacks	52	1st
Forced fumbles	22	T–1st
Fumble recoveries	13	T–4th
Interceptions	14	T–13th

Special Teams
Category	Value	NFL rank (out of 32)
Kickoff returns	21.8 YPR	23rd
Punt returns	9.8 YPR	10th
Gross punting	43.6 YPP	27th
Net punting	39.5 YPP	21st
Kickoff coverage	20.3 YPR	6th
Punt coverage	6.9 YPR	12th

Source for this section: NFL.com.

== Postseason ==
=== Schedule ===
Round	Date	Opponent (seed)	Result	Record	Venue	Recap
Wild Card	First-round bye					
Divisional	January 17, 2016	Pittsburgh Steelers (6)	W 23–16	1–0	Sports Authority Field at Mile High	Recap
AFC Championship	January 24, 2016	New England Patriots (2)	W 20–18	2–0	Sports Authority Field at Mile High	Recap
Super Bowl 50	February 7, 2016	vs. Carolina Panthers (N1)	W 24–10	3–0	Levi's Stadium	Recap

=== Game summaries ===
==== AFC Divisional Playoffs: vs. (6) Pittsburgh Steelers ====
AFC Divisional Playoffs: (6) Pittsburgh Steelers at (1) Denver Broncos – Game summary

Quarter	1	2	3	4	Total
Steelers	7	3	3	3	16
Broncos	6	3	3	11	23

at Sports Authority Field at Mile High, Denver, Colorado

- Date: January 17, 2016
- Game time: 2:40 p.m. MST
- Game weather: 43 °F (6 °C), sunny
- Game attendance: 76,956
- Referee: Terry McAulay
- TV announcers (CBS): Jim Nantz, Phil Simms and Tracy Wolfson
- Recap, Gamebook

Game information

First quarter

- DEN – 11:21 Brandon McManus 28-yard FG. Drive: 5 plays, 20 yards, 1:57. (DEN 3–0)
- DEN – 3:40 Brandon McManus 41-yard FG. Drive: 4 plays, 8 yards, 1:26. (DEN 6–0)
- PIT – 1:22 Fitzgerald Toussaint 1-yard TD run, Chris Boswell kick. Drive: 5 plays, 80 yards, 2:18. (PIT 7–6)

Second quarter

- PIT – 10:19 Chris Boswell 43-yard FG. Drive: 7 plays, 60 yards, 3:53. (PIT 10–6)
- DEN – 0:00 Brandon McManus 51-yard FG. Drive: 11 plays, 62 yards, 3:14. (PIT 10–9)

Third quarter

- PIT – 9:32 Chris Boswell 28-yard FG. Drive: 8 plays, 69 yards, 2:19. (PIT 13–9)
- DEN – 2:45 Brandon McManus 41-yard FG. Drive: 7 plays, 30 yards, 3:08. (PIT 13–12)

Fourth quarter

- DEN – 3:00 C. J. Anderson 1-yard TD run, Peyton Manning pass to Demaryius Thomas for a two-point conversion. Drive: 13 plays, 65 yards, 6:52. (DEN 20–13)
- DEN – 0:53 Brandon McManus 45-yard FG. Drive: 4 plays, 3 yards, 0:56. (DEN 23–13)
- PIT – 0:19 Chris Boswell 47-yard FG. Drive: 4 plays, 51 yards, 0:34. (DEN 23–16)

Top passers

- PIT – Ben Roethlisberger: 24/37, 339 yards
- DEN – Peyton Manning: 21/37, 222 yards

Top rushers

- PIT – Martavis Bryant: 2 rushes, 40 yards
- DEN – C. J. Anderson: 15 rushes, 72 yards, 1 TD

Top receivers

- PIT – Martavis Bryant: 9 receptions, 154 yards
- DEN – Emmanuel Sanders: 5 receptions, 85 yards

Top tacklers

- PIT – William Gay: 7 tackles, 1 assist
- DEN – Danny Trevathan: 8 tackles, 1 assist

Following a first-round bye, the Broncos began their run in the 2015–16 NFL playoffs at home by hosting the Pittsburgh Steelers in the divisional round, in the eighth playoff meeting between the two teams. The Broncos' first drive of the game started at the Steelers' 30-yard line, following a 42-yard punt return by Omar Bolden, but the Broncos were forced to settle on a 28-yard field goal by placekicker Brandon McManus. The Steelers drove to the Broncos' 32-yard line on their next possession and chose to convert a 4th-and-1 instead of attempting a field goal in high winds, but Broncos' cornerback Aqib Talib broke up a long pass from Steelers' quarterback Ben Roethlisberger to wide receiver Markus Wheaton at the goal line. Later in the first quarter, McManus added a 41-yard field goal to give the Broncos a 6–0 lead. The Steelers then drove 80 yards in five plays, and grabbed the lead, with running back Fitzgerald Toussaint rushing for a 1-yard touchdown, then added to their lead early in the second quarter, with a 43-yard field goal by placekicker Chris Boswell. McManus made a 51-yard field goal as time expired in the first half to narrow the Steelers' lead to 10–9. The Broncos' offense converted only one third down out of eight attempts in the first half.

Boswell made a 28-yard field goal on the Steelers' first possession of the second half to extend to a 13–9 lead. After the two teams exchanged punts, McManus kicked his fourth field goal of the game – from 41 yards out. Following an exchange of punts, the Steelers, with a one-point lead, drove 41 yards to the Broncos' 34-yard line in three plays. On the fourth play, Broncos' cornerback Bradley Roby forced a fumble off Toussaint, which was recovered by linebacker DeMarcus Ware with 9:52 remaining in the game. The Broncos then drove 65 yards in 13 plays that consumed 6:48 off the clock, and re-claimed the lead, with running back C. J. Anderson marching for a 1-yard touchdown, coupled with quarterback Peyton Manning throwing a quick pass to wide receiver Demaryius Thomas for a two-point conversion. The Steelers were attempting a rally, but the Broncos' defense tightened, and a Ware sack of Roethlisberger on fourth down just after the two-minute warning gave the Broncos the football at the Steelers' 30-yard line. Three plays later, after forcing the Steelers to burn two of their three remaining timeouts, the Broncos added to their lead, with McManus' fifth field goal of the game – a 45-yarder with 57 seconds remaining. The Steelers then advanced to the Broncos' 29-yard line, following a defensive pass interference penalty on Ward and two passes from Roethlisberger to Bryant totaling 29 yards. With only 19 seconds remaining, a 47-yard field goal by Boswell pulled the Steelers to within 23–16. However, the Steelers' ensuing onside kick attempt was unsuccessful.

With the win, the Broncos advanced to the AFC Championship game.

Notes

The Broncos improved their all-time playoff record against the Steelers to 5–3.

==== AFC Championship: vs. (2) New England Patriots ====
AFC Championship: (2) New England Patriots at (1) Denver Broncos – Game summary

Quarter	1	2	3	4	Total
Patriots	6	3	3	6	18
Broncos	7	10	0	3	20

at Sports Authority Field at Mile High, Denver, Colorado

- Date: January 24, 2016
- Game time: 1:05 pm. MST
- Game weather: 46 °F (8 °C), mostly sunny
- Game attendance: 77,112
- Referee: Ed Hochuli
- TV announcers (CBS): Jim Nantz, Phil Simms, Tracy Wolfson, Evan Washburn and Jay Feely
- Recap, Gamebook

Game information

First quarter

- DEN – 7:32 Owen Daniels 21-yard TD pass from Peyton Manning, Brandon McManus kick. Drive: 11 plays, 83 yards, 5:30. (DEN 7–0)
- NE – 1:49 Steven Jackson 1-yard TD run, extra-point failed, wide right. Drive: 2 plays, 22 yards, 0:34. (DEN 7–6)

Second quarter

- DEN – 13:46 Owen Daniels 12-yard TD pass from Peyton Manning, Brandon McManus kick. Drive: 3 plays, 16 yards, 0:49. (DEN 14–6)
- NE – 7:02 Stephen Gostkowski 46-yard FG. Drive: 13 plays, 48 yards, 6:44. (DEN 14–9)
- DEN – 0:33 Brandon McManus 52-yard FG. Drive: 6 plays, 23 yards, 1:13. (DEN 17–9)

Third quarter

- NE – 10:26 Stephen Gostkowski 38-yard FG. Drive: 8 plays, 47 yards, 2:49. (DEN 17–12)

Fourth quarter

- DEN – 10:02 Brandon McManus 31-yard FG. Drive: 10 plays, 48 yards, 4:58. (DEN 20–12)
- NE – 0:12 Rob Gronkowski 4-yard TD pass from Tom Brady, 2-point conversion failed. Drive: 8 plays, 50 yards, 1:40. (DEN 20–18)

Top passers

- NE – Tom Brady: 27/56, 310 yards, 1 TD, 2 INT
- DEN – Peyton Manning: 17/32, 176 yards, 2 TD

Top rushers

- NE – Tom Brady: 3 rushes, 13 yards
- DEN – C. J. Anderson: 16 rushes, 72 yards

Top receivers

- NE – Rob Gronkowski: 8 receptions, 144 yards, 1 TD
- DEN – Emmanuel Sanders: 5 receptions, 62 yards

Top tacklers

- NE – Jamie Collins and Malcolm Butler: 6 tackles each (2 assists by Collins, 1 assist by Butler)
- DEN – Derek Wolfe: 6 tackles, 1 sack

Coming off their Divisional playoff win over the Steelers, the Broncos hosted the No. 2 seed New England Patriots in the AFC Championship. The Broncos claimed the lead on their first possession, with quarterback Peyton Manning throwing a 21-yard touchdown pass to tight end Owen Daniels. The Broncos' defense forced the Patriots' offense to punt on their first three possessions. Later in the first quarter, Manning threw a pass that was intended for running back Ronnie Hillman, but after a Patriots' challenge, the play was ruled a backwards pass and fumble, which was recovered by Patriots' linebacker Jonathan Freeny. The Patriots capitalized two plays later, with running back Steven Jackson rushing for a 1-yard touchdown. However, placekicker Stephen Gostkowski missed wide right on the extra-point attempt. Early in the second quarter, Patriots' quarterback Tom Brady was intercepted by Broncos' linebacker Von Miller deep in Patriots' territory. Three plays later, Manning threw another touchdown pass to Daniels – from 12 yards out, in what was the final touchdown pass of Manning's career – regular season or postseason. The Patriots cut into the Broncos' lead midway through the second quarter, with Gostkowski making a 46-yard field goal. The Broncos extended their lead to 17–9 just before halftime, with a 52-yard field goal by placekicker Brandon McManus.

A 38-yard field goal by Gostkowski was the only scoring play of the third quarter. The Broncos' offense went three-and-out on two of their three possessions of the third quarter. To begin the fourth quarter, the Broncos marched to the Patriots' 13-yard line, keyed by a 30-yard run by running back C. J. Anderson, but Manning overthrew wide receiver Jordan Norwood in the end zone on a third-down passing play. The Broncos had to settle on a 31-yard field goal by McManus to extend to a 20–12 lead with 10:06 remaining in the game. The Patriots marched down the field, and were facing a 4th-and-1 at the Broncos' 16-yard line with 6:06 remaining. However, instead of kicking a field goal, Brady threw a short pass to wide receiver Julian Edelman, who was tackled for 1-yard loss by cornerback Chris Harris, Jr. The Broncos were forced to punt on their next possession, and the Patriots once again drove deep into Broncos' territory, facing a 4th-and-6 with 2:25 remaining. However, the Patriots' turned the football over on downs once again, with Brady throwing an incomplete pass in the back of the end zone that was intended for tight end Rob Gronkowski, who was triple-covered by the Broncos' secondary.

The Broncos' offense forced the Patriots to burn two of their three team timeouts prior to two-minute warning, but went three-and-out, giving the football back to the Patriots. The Patriots started their final offensive possession at midfield with 1:52 remaining. After Brady threw three consecutive incompletions, he connected with Gronkowski on a 40-yard pass on a 4th-and-10 play to keep the drive alive. With 17 seconds remaining, the Patriots were facing a 4th-and-goal at the Broncos' 4-yard line, and Brady found Gronkowski in the back of the end zone for a touchdown to narrow the Broncos' lead to 20–18. However, Broncos' cornerback Bradley Roby intercepted Brady on the potential game-tying two-point conversion attempt. The Patriots' ensuing onside kick attempt was unsuccessful, sealing the win for the Broncos.

With the win, the Broncos advanced to their eighth Super Bowl in team history. This was also the final meeting in the rivalry between legendary quarterbacks Peyton Manning and Tom Brady – regular season or postseason. Brady owned an 11–6 record vs. Manning, including the postseason, where Manning held a 3–2 edge (3–1 in AFC title games). As of 2025, this remains the last time the Broncos won at home against the Patriots.

==== Super Bowl 50: vs. (N1) Carolina Panthers ====
Super Bowl 50: (N1) Carolina Panthers vs. (A1) Denver Broncos – Game summary

Quarter	1	2	3	4	Total
Panthers	0	7	0	3	10
Broncos	10	3	3	8	24

at Levi's Stadium, Santa Clara, California

- Date: February 7, 2016
- Game time: 4:30 pm. MST/3:30 p.m. PST
- Game weather: 76 °F (24 °C), sunny
- Game attendance: 71,088
- Referee: Clete Blakeman
- TV announcers (CBS): Jim Nantz, Phil Simms, Evan Washburn and Tracy Wolfson
- Recap, Gamebook

Game information

First quarter

- DEN – 10:43 Brandon McManus 34-yard FG. Drive: 10 plays, 64 yards, 4:17. (DEN 3–0)
- DEN – 6:27 Malik Jackson recovered fumble in the end zone for a TD, Brandon McManus kick. (DEN 10–0)

Second quarter

- CAR – 11:25 Jonathan Stewart 1-yard TD run, Graham Gano kick. Drive: 9 plays, 73 yards, 4:50. (DEN 10–7)
- DEN – 6:58 Brandon McManus 33-yard FG. Drive: 4 plays, −1 yards, 2:13. (DEN 13–7)

Third quarter

- DEN – 8:18 Brandon McManus 30-yard FG. Drive: 7 plays, 54 yards, 2:30. (DEN 16–7)

Fourth quarter

- CAR – 10:21 Graham Gano 39-yard FG. Drive: 6 plays, 29 yards, 2:56. (DEN 16–10)
- DEN – 3:08 C. J. Anderson 2-yard run, Peyton Manning pass to Bennie Fowler for a two-point conversion. Drive: 3 plays, 4 yards, 0:56. (DEN 24–10)

Top passers

- CAR – Cam Newton: 18/41, 265 yards, 1 INT
- DEN – Peyton Manning: 13/23, 141 yards, 1 INT

Top rushers

- CAR – Cam Newton: 6 rushes, 45 yards
- DEN – C. J. Anderson: 23 rushes, 90 yards, 1 TD

Top receivers

- CAR – Corey Brown: 4 receptions, 80 yards
- DEN – Emmanuel Sanders: 6 receptions, 83 yards

Top tacklers

- CAR – Luke Kuechly: 7 tackles, 3 assists, 1 sack
- DEN – Von Miller, Chris Harris, Jr., Malik Jackson and Aqib Talib: 5 tackles each (1 assist, 2.5 sacks, and 2 forced fumbles by Miller, 1 sack by Harris and 1 fumble recovery by Jackson)

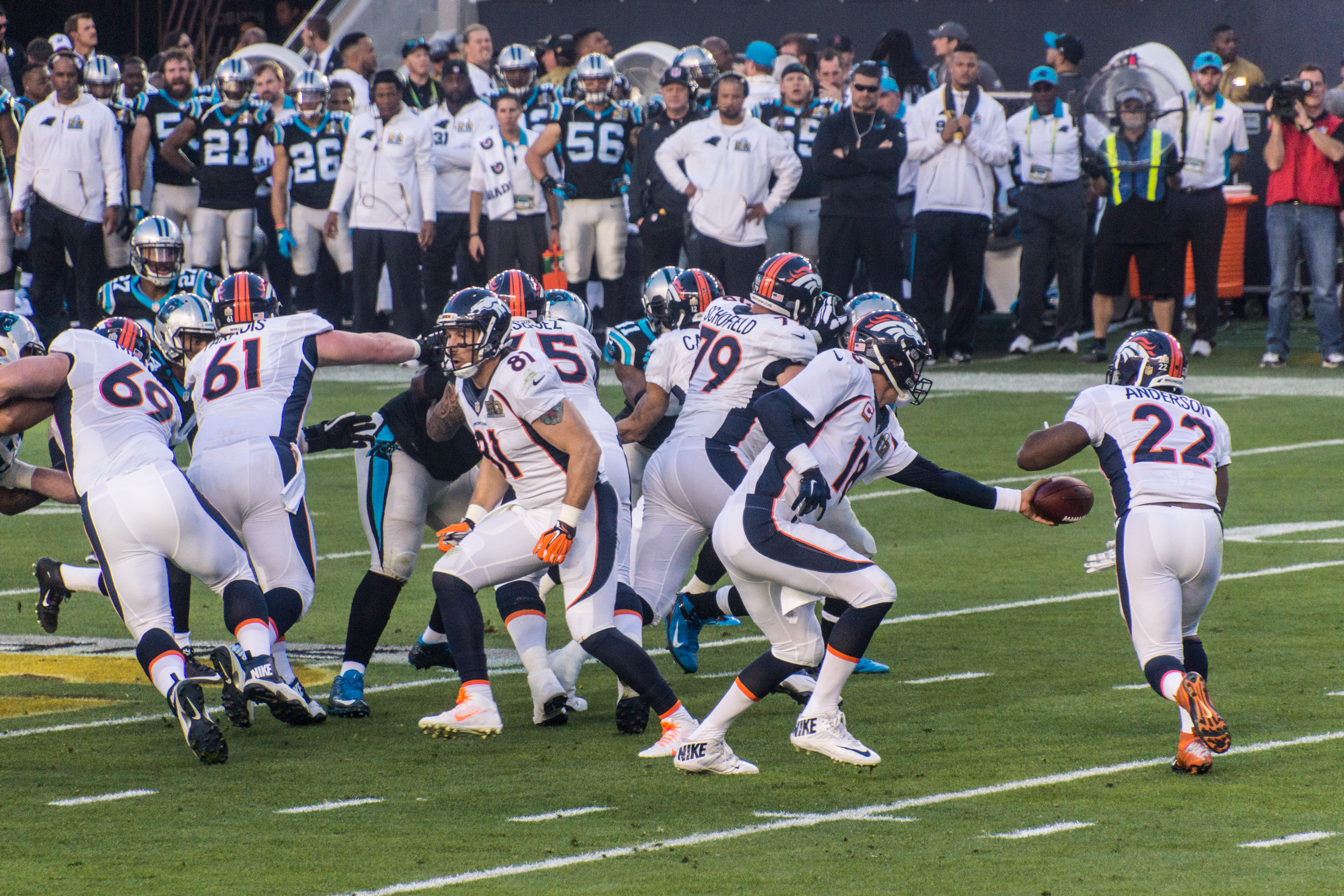
Peyton Manning handing the ball off to C. J. Anderson at Super Bowl 50

Placekicker Brandon McManus gave the Broncos the lead on the first possession of the game, with a 34-yard field goal. Following an exchange of punts, Broncos' linebacker Von Miller forced a fumble off Panthers' quarterback Cam Newton, which was recovered by defensive end Malik Jackson in the end zone, giving the Broncos a 10–0 lead. Following another exchange of punts, the Panthers got on the scoreboard early in the second quarter, with running back Jonathan Stewart diving for a 1-yard touchdown. Following miscommunication by the Panthers' defensive special teams, Broncos' return specialist Jordan Norwood returned a punt to the Panthers' 14-yard line. However, the Broncos were forced to settle for a 33-yard field goal by McManus.

The Panthers took the opening possession of the second half, and drove to the Broncos' 26-yard line. However, placekicker Graham Gano missed on a 44-yard field goal attempt that hit the right upright. During the Panthers' drive, Miller broke up a pass from Newton to wide receiver Jerricho Cotchery that would have given the Panthers a first-and-goal. McManus added a 30-yard field goal to extend the Broncos' lead. Early in the fourth quarter, Panthers' defensive end Kony Ealy forced a strip sack and fumble recovery off Broncos' quarterback Peyton Manning near midfield, but were forced to settle on a 39-yard field goal by Gano to narrow the Broncos' lead to 16–10. With 4:51 remaining, Miller then forced yet another strip sack and fumble off Newton, ending the Panthers' drive, with safety T. J. Ward recovering the football at the Panthers' 4-yard line. Following a defensive holding penalty on Panthers' cornerback Josh Norman on a third-and-goal, the Broncos added to their lead, with running back C. J. Anderson rushing for a 2-yard touchdown, coupled with Manning completing a pass to wide receiver Bennie Fowler for a two-point conversion with 3:13 remaining. The Panthers had two more offensive possessions, but the Broncos' defense stood their ground, preventing a first down on both drives to win their third Super Bowl.

Notes

Peyton Manning's two-point conversion pass to Bennie Fowler late in the fourth quarter was the final pass attempt and completion of Manning's 18-year NFL career, and this was Manning's final NFL game, as he retired on March 7, 2016. As of 2025, this remains the last time the Broncos appeared in the Super Bowl let alone won the Super Bowl.

== Records and milestones ==
Numerous individual, franchise and league records and milestones were either tied, reached or broken during the season:

=== Team ===
- Week 2: With their 31–24 win over the Kansas City Chiefs at Arrowhead Stadium, the Broncos set a new NFL record for consecutive divisional road wins with 13, surpassing the previous record that the San Francisco 49ers held from 1987 to 1990. They would extend their streak to 15 games, with wins over the Oakland Raiders (Week 5) and San Diego Chargers (Week 13).
- Week 6: The Broncos became the second original American Football League (AFL) franchise to reach 450 regular season wins, joining the New England Patriots.
- 2015 season: Head coach Gary Kubiak tied a franchise record for wins by a first-year head coach with 12, a feat achieved by Red Miller in 1977. The Broncos became the fourth team in NFL history to reach eight Super Bowls, which, at the time, was tied with the Dallas Cowboys, New England Patriots and Pittsburgh Steelers for the most Super Bowl appearances, until the Patriots made their ninth Super Bowl appearance in 2016.
- Super Bowl 50: The Broncos tied an NFL record for sacks in a Super Bowl, with 7.

=== Peyton Manning ===
- Week 2: Became the second quarterback in NFL history to achieve 70,000 career passing yards, joining Brett Favre.
- Week 3: Became the second quarterback in NFL history to achieve 6,000 career pass completions, joining Brett Favre.
- Week 4: The Broncos' 23–20 win over the Minnesota Vikings was Peyton Manning's 100th career home win; he became the second quarterback in NFL history to achieve 100 home wins, joining Brett Favre (113).
- Week 5: At the time, Manning became the NFL's all-time leader in combined regular season and postseason passing yardage, surpassing Brett Favre, until New England Patriots' quarterback Tom Brady surpassed that record in 2018.
- Week 8: At the time, Manning tied Brett Favre for the NFL's all-time record for regular season wins by a starting quarterback (both with 186), until Tom Brady surpassed both Manning and Favre in 2017. This would be Peyton Manning's final regular-season win as a starting QB, as he would lose his next two starts against the Colts and Chiefs and would not start another game until the Broncos' Divisional Round matchup against the Steelers due to his plantar fasciitis injury.
- Week 10: At the time, Manning became the NFL's all-time leader in regular season passing yardage, surpassing Brett Favre. Manning and Favre were both surpassed by New Orleans Saints' quarterback Drew Brees in 2018, and Brees was surpassed by Tom Brady in 2021.
- Super Bowl 50: Became the first quarterback in NFL history to lead two different teams to multiple Super Bowl berths and wins. Manning led the Indianapolis Colts to Super Bowls XLI and XLIV – the former of which the Colts won, with Manning winning Most Valuable Player honors; he also led the Broncos to Super Bowl XLVIII (a loss) and won Super Bowl 50. At the time, Manning was the oldest quarterback to lead a team to a Super Bowl berth and victory, as well as the NFL's all-time leader in combined regular season and playoff wins – records that have since been surpassed by Tom Brady.

=== Other players ===
- Brandon McManus:
  - Week 1: Became the second kicker in NFL history to make multiple field goals of 56 or more yards in the same game, joining St. Louis Rams' kicker Greg Zuerlein, who achieved that feat in 2012.
  - Divisional playoffs: Set a new franchise record and tied an NFL record for field goals in a playoff game, with five.
- Von Miller:
  - Week 2: Miller recorded his 50th career sack in his 58th game, becoming the third-fastest player in NFL history behind Derrick Thomas (54 games) and Reggie White (40 games) to achieve that feat.
  - 2015 season: Became only the third player in Broncos' franchise history to be selected to at least four Pro Bowls within the first five years with the team, joining Steve Atwater and Floyd Little.
  - AFC Championship: Set a franchise record with 2.5 sacks in a playoff game.
- Jordan Norwood: At the time, Norwood set an NFL record for the longest punt return in Super Bowl history, with a 61-yard return, until Kansas City Chiefs' wide receiver Kadarius Toney surpassed that record with a 65-yard punt return in Super Bowl LVII.
- Demaryius Thomas:
  - Week 17: Surpassed Rod Smith for the most 100-yard receiving games in franchise history, with 32.
  - 2015 season: Became only the third wide receiver in NFL history to achieve at least 90 catches, 1,300 yards and five touchdowns in four consecutive seasons, joining Marvin Harrison and Jerry Rice.

== Awards and honors ==
Recipient	awards
C. J. Anderson	Week 12: AFC Offensive Player of the Week
David Bruton	Named as the team's Walter Payton Man of the Year
Ronnie Hillman	Week 17: AFC Offensive Player of the Week
Brandon McManus	October: AFC Special Teams Player of the Month
Von Miller	Super Bowl 50 Most Valuable Player
Brock Osweiler	Week 11: AFC Offensive Player of the Week
Wade Phillips	2015 season: Pro Football Writers of America Co-Assistant Coach of the Year
Aqib Talib	Week 1: AFC Defensive Player of the Week
T. J. Ward	Week 4: AFC Defensive Player of the Week
DeMarcus Ware	September: AFC Defensive Player of the Month
Derek Wolfe	Week 8: AFC Defensive Player of the Week

=== Pro Bowl and All-Pro selections ===
Four Broncos were selected to the 2016 Pro Bowl: Cornerbacks Chris Harris, Jr. and Aqib Talib, and linebackers Von Miller and DeMarcus Ware. Linebacker Brandon Marshall, wide receiver Demaryius Thomas, guard Louis Vasquez and safety T. J. Ward were named as reserves. However, due to participation in Super Bowl 50, none of them participated in the Pro Bowl. Harris and Miller were also voted to the 2015 All-Pro Team – Miller was named to the First team, while Harris was named to the Second Team.

== Other news and notes ==
- On March 4, quarterback Peyton Manning agreed to a restructured contract that paid him $15 million for the 2015 season. Under the original contract that Manning signed in 2012, Manning had been slated to earn $19 million in 2015. Manning earned back $2 million with the Broncos' win over the New England Patriots in the AFC Championship, and earned an additional $2 million with the Broncos' Super Bowl 50 win.
- Tight end Owen Daniels, who was signed at the beginning of the free agency period in March, played the first ten years of his NFL career (2006–15) under the tutelage of head coach Gary Kubiak and tight ends coach Brian Pariani. Daniels played eight seasons with the Houston Texans from 2006 to 2013 and one season with the Baltimore Ravens in 2014, the latter of which Kubiak served as an offensive coordinator. Daniels was released on March 8, 2016, after only one season with the Broncos.
