= Kyle Roberts =

American football player (born 1992)

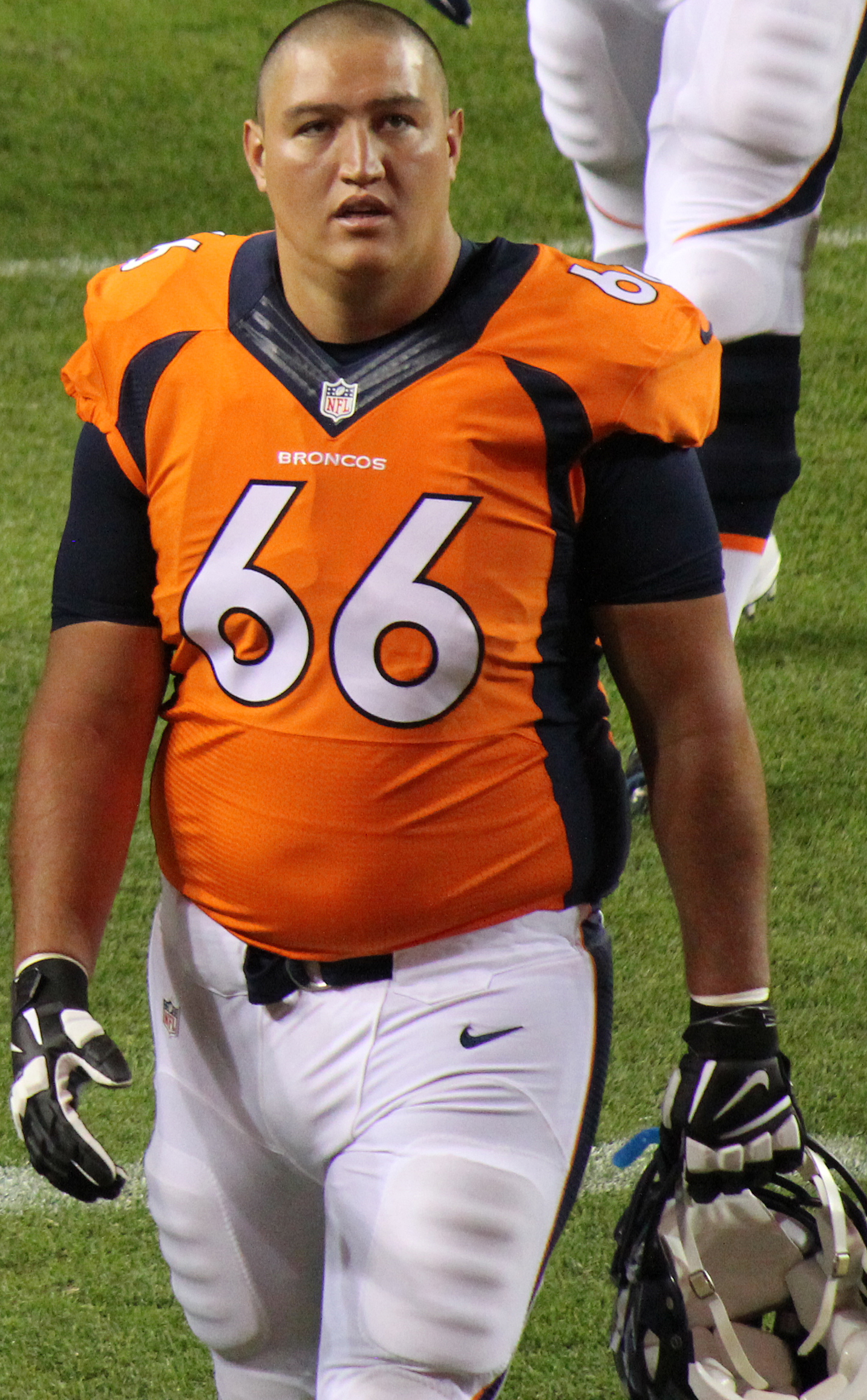
- Roberts in the 2015 NFL preseason

No. 66
- Position: Offensive tackle

Personal information
- Born: February 9, 1992 (age 34); Sparks, Nevada
- Listed height: 6 ft 6 in (1.98 m)
- Listed weight: 305 lb (138 kg)

Career information
- High school: Edward C. Reed
- College: Nevada
- NFL draft: 2015: undrafted

Career history
- Denver Broncos (2015–2016)*
- * Offseason or practice squad member only

Awards and highlights
- Super Bowl champion (50)

Kyle Deshun Roberts (born February 9, 1992) is an American former professional football offensive tackle. He was signed with Broncos as an undrafted free agent in 2015. He played college football at the University of Nevada, Reno.

== Professional career ==
After going unselected in the 2015 NFL draft, Roberts signed with the Denver Broncos on May 3, 2015. He was waived for final roster cuts before the start of the 2015 season, but signed with the Broncos' practice squad on September 7.

On February 7, 2016, Roberts was part of the Broncos team that won Super Bowl 50. In the game, the Broncos defeated the Carolina Panthers by a score of 24–10.

On August 30, 2016, Roberts was waived by the Broncos.
