= Connor Rains =

American football player (born 1992)

Profile
- Position: Offensive tackle

Personal information
- Born: March 25, 1992 (age 34); Placerville, California, U.S.
- Listed height: 6 ft 8 in (2.03 m)
- Listed weight: 328 lb (149 kg)

Career information
- High school: Shingle Springs (CA)
- College: Wyoming University
- NFL draft: 2015: undrafted

Career history
- Denver Broncos (2015)*
- * Offseason or practice squad member only

Connor Rains (born March 25, 1992) is an American former football offensive tackle. He played college football at Wyoming. He was signed by the Denver Broncos as an undrafted free agent in 2015.

== Professional career ==
On May 2, following the 2015 NFL draft, the Denver Broncos signed Rains and eight other undrafted free agents to contracts. On August 2, he was waived by the Broncos due to an injury to his plantar fascia.
