= Brian Pariani =

American football coach and executive

Profile
- Position: Tight ends coach

Personal information
- Born: July 2, 1965 (age 61); San Francisco, California, U.S.

Career information
- High school: Marin (CA) Catholic
- College: UCLA

Career history

Coaching
- UCLA Graduate assistant (1989); San Francisco 49ers Offensive assistant (1991–1994); Denver Broncos Tight ends coach (1995–2004); Syracuse Offensive coordinator (2005); Houston Texans Tight ends coach (2006–2013); Baltimore Ravens Tight ends coach (2014); Denver Broncos Tight ends coach (2015–2016); Minnesota Vikings Tight ends coach (2019–2021)

Operations
- San Francisco 49ers Scout (1990)

Awards and highlights
- 4× Super Bowl champion (XXIX, XXXII, XXXIII, 50)

Brian Pariani (born July 2, 1965) is an American professional football coach. He is a longtime assistant of and he has worked exclusively on the staffs of Gary Kubiak and was a member of four Super Bowl winning teams with the San Francisco 49ers in Super Bowl XXIX and the Denver Broncos in Super Bowl XXXII, Super Bowl XXXIII, and Super Bowl 50.

Currently Pariani is developing and coaching players through his company Pariani Sports Consulting.

== Coaching ==
Pariani has more than 30 years of coaching experience, and over 20 coaching tight ends all of them with Gary Kubiak with the exception of the 2005 season, when Pariani was at Syracuse. Hall of Fame Tight end Shannon Sharpe was named to 4 consecutive Pro Bowls (1995-1998) and three straight All-Pro teams (1996-1998) under Pariani. On February 7, 2016, Pariani was part of the Broncos coaching staff that won Super Bowl 50. In the game, the Broncos defeated the Carolina Panthers by a score of 24–10. Pariani was fired from the Denver Broncos on January 12, 2017.
