= Tony Coaxum =

American football player and coach (born 1976)

Current position
- Title: Associate head coach & special teams coordinator
- Team: The Citadel
- Conference: SoCon

Biographical details
- Born: December 2, 1976 (age 49); Charleston, South Carolina, U.S.
- Education: United States Military Academy (2000)

Playing career
- 1996–1999: Army
- Position: Cornerback

Coaching career (HC unless noted)
- 2007–2008: Army (assistant LB)
- 2009–2013: Army (CB)
- 2014: Baltimore Ravens (ST intern)
- 2015–2016: Denver Broncos (assistant ST)
- 2018: Central Michigan (ST/CB)
- 2019: Kansas (sr. ST analyst)
- 2020: Northern Colorado (ST/DB)
- 2021–2023: Bluefield State
- 2024: The Citadel (ST)
- 2025–present: The Citadel (assoc. HC/ST)

Head coaching record
- Overall: 9–16

Accomplishments and honors

Championships
- As an assistant coach Super Bowl champion (50)

Anthony Terron Coaxum (born December 2, 1976) is an American college football coach. He is the associate head football coach and special teams coordinator The Citadel, positions he has held since 2025. He was the head football coach for Bluefield State University from 2020 to 2023. He previously coached for Army, the Baltimore Ravens and Denver Broncos of the National Football League (NFL), Central Michigan, and Northern Colorado. He played college football for Army and served in the United States Army for three years.

== Head coaching record ==
Year	Team	Overall	Conference	Standing	Bowl/playoffs
Bluefield State Big Blues (NCAA Division II independent) (2021–2022)
2021	Bluefield State	4–3			
2022	Bluefield State	4–4			
Bluefield State Big Blues (Central Intercollegiate Athletic Association) (2023)
2023	Bluefield State	1–9	0–8	6th (Northern)	
Bluefield State:		9–16	0–8		
Total:		9–16			
