= 2018 Denver Broncos season =

American football team season

- Owner: The Pat Bowlen Trust
- General manager: John Elway
- Head coach: Vance Joseph
- Home stadium: Broncos Stadium at Mile High

Results
- Record: 6–10
- Division place: 3rd AFC West
- Playoffs: Did not qualify
- All-Pros: LB Von Miller (2nd team)
- Pro Bowlers: CB Chris Harris Jr. LS Casey Kreiter; RB Phillip Lindsay; OLB Von Miller

Uniform
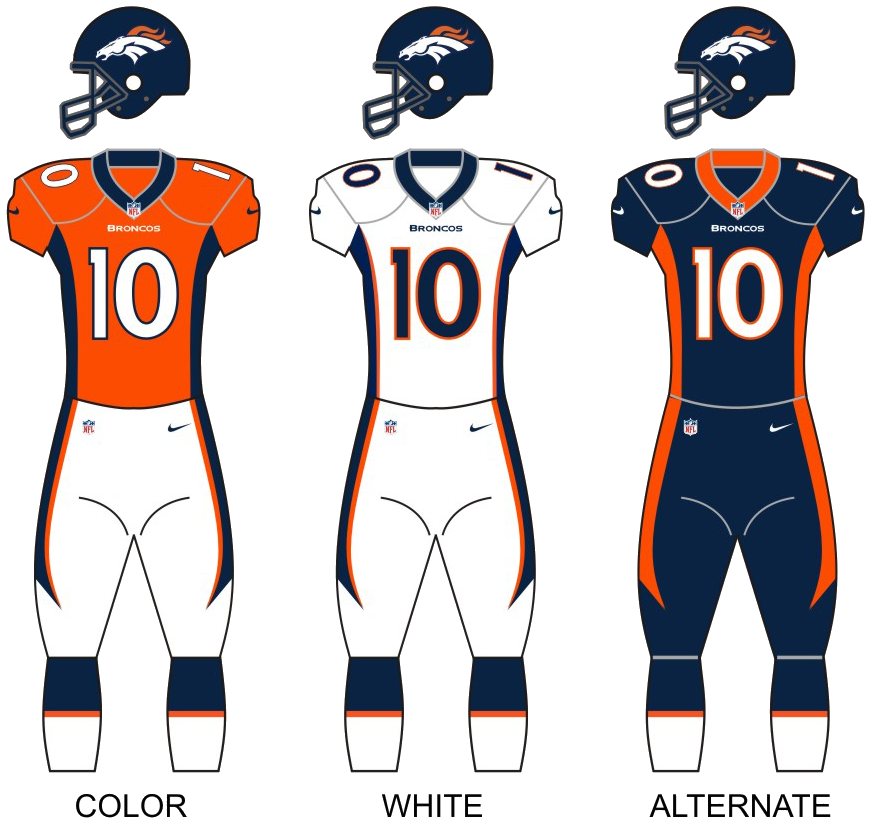

The 2018 season was the Denver Broncos' 49th season in the National Football League (NFL) and their 59th overall.

After poor offensive statistics that resulted in a 5–11 record during the previous season, the Broncos hoped for improvement at the quarterback position, with the offseason signing of Case Keenum as well as the breakthrough of undrafted rookie running back Phillip Lindsay. Another rookie that made an impact was linebacker Bradley Chubb, who recorded 12 sacks following a slow start. However, for a third consecutive season, the Broncos scored 30 or more points only once, and midway through the season, longtime wide receiver Demaryius Thomas was traded to the Houston Texans.

Following a 3–6 start, the Broncos put together a three-game winning streak, with hopes of turning their season around and competing for a playoff spot. However, key late-season injuries to cornerback Chris Harris Jr. (fractured fibula) and wide receiver Emmanuel Sanders (ruptured Achilles tendon) derailed those hopes, sending the Broncos to a season-ending four-game losing streak and a 6–10 record – only a one-win improvement from 2017.

For the first time since 2010, the Broncos did not play the New England Patriots during the regular season.

The Broncos missed the playoffs for a third consecutive season, suffered back-to-back losing seasons for the first time since 1971–1972 and back-to-back double-digit losses for the first time since 1966–1967, resulting in the firing of head coach Vance Joseph at the end of the season. Joseph posted an 11–21 record in his two seasons as the Broncos' head coach. This was the third consecutive season with one game involving the Broncos getting at least 30 points.

This was also the 35th and final season under the ownership of Pat Bowlen, who died on June 13, 2019.

== Coaching changes ==
- January 1: One day after the 2017 regular season finale, the Broncos parted ways with six coaching assistants, firing special teams coordinator Brock Olivo, running backs/assistant head coach Eric Studesville, wide receivers coach Tyke Tolbert, outside linebackers coach Fred Pagac, defensive backs coach Johnnie Lynn and offensive line coach Jeff Davidson. Bill Musgrave, who was promoted to offensive coordinator midway through the 2017 season, shed the interim tag, and remained as the full-time offensive coordinator.
- January 3: Sean Kugler was hired as the new offensive line coach, replacing Jeff Davidson. Kugler, who will focus on the guards and centers, was the head coach at the University of Texas at El Paso from 2013 to 2017, and has previously served as an offensive line coach for the Detroit Lions (2004–2005), Buffalo Bills (2007–2009) and Pittsburgh Steelers (2010–2012).
- January 4: Mike Sullivan was hired as the new quarterbacks coach, while Curtis Modkins was hired as running backs coach. Sullivan was the New York Giants' quarterbacks coach and offensive coordinator during the previous three seasons (2015–2017), while Modkins served as the Chicago Bears' running backs coach in 2017. Klint Kubiak, who was promoted to quarterbacks coach after Bill Musgrave was promoted to offensive coordinator midway through the 2017 season, will remain on the Broncos' staff as an offensive assistant.
- January 9: Tom McMahon was hired as the new special teams coordinator. McMahon served in the same capacity with the Indianapolis Colts from 2014 to 2017.
- January 10: Chris Strausser was promoted from an offensive assistant to offensive line coach, and will focus on the tackles. Greg Williams was hired as a defensive backs coach, and will focus on the cornerbacks. Williams worked in the same capacity with the Indianapolis Colts during the previous two seasons. Zach Azzanni was hired as wide receivers coach. Azzanni worked in the same capacity with the Chicago Bears in 2017.
- June 13: DeMarcus Ware, a former Broncos' defensive lineman from 2014 to 2016, was hired as a part-time pass-rush consultant, and will tutor the Broncos' next crop of pass rushers.

== Front office changes ==
On July 2, Tom Heckert Jr., who had worked as a director of pro personnel and senior personnel advisor since 2013, stepped down from his position due to health concerns and the expiration of his contract. Heckert was diagnosed with amyloidosis in 2015 and was placed on medical leave during the second half of that season. Heckert died on August 6, 2018, at the age of 51. Former Broncos' head coach Gary Kubiak remained as the team's lone senior personnel adviser until the end of the season.

== Ownership sale ==
On March 21, 2018, the Broncos announced that John Bowlen, the brother of majority owner Pat Bowlen, agreed to sell a portion of his minority stake in the franchise back to the team. The statement released by the team said:

"The Denver Broncos have reached an agreement to purchase a portion of minority owner John Bowlen's share of the team, pending final approval from the NFL that is expected in the next few days. This transaction further consolidates Pat Bowlen's majority, controlling ownership interest in the Broncos while keeping 100 percent of the team in the Bowlen family. The acquisition of this share is independent of Mr. Bowlen's succession plan that is being administered by the Pat Bowlen Trust. John has been a great partner for many years, and we are very pleased he will remain a minority owner of the Denver Broncos."

== Roster changes ==
=== Free agents ===
==== Unrestricted ====
Position	Player	2018 team	Notes
OT	Allen Barbre	None	
RB	Jamaal Charles	None	
DE	Jared Crick	None	
LB	Todd Davis	Denver Broncos	re-signed March 14
WR	Bennie Fowler III	Chicago Bears	originally an RFA, signed with the Bears on April 16
TE	Virgil Green	Los Angeles Chargers	signed with the Chargers on March 14
WR	Cody Latimer	New York Giants	signed with the Giants on March 19
LB	Corey Nelson	Philadelphia Eagles	signed with the Eagles on March 14
QB	Brock Osweiler	Miami Dolphins	signed with the Dolphins on March 23
OT	Donald Stephenson	Cleveland Browns	signed with the Browns on March 14
G	Billy Turner	Denver Broncos	re-signed March 17
DE	Billy Winn	None	

==== Restricted and Exclusive-Rights ====
Position	Player	Tag	2018 team	Notes
LB	Zaire Anderson	ERFA	None	assigned tender on March 12, re-signed April 16, waived September 1
LB	Shaquil Barrett	RFA	Denver Broncos	assigned tender on March 12, re-signed April 23
LB	Jerrol Garcia-Williams	ERFA	None	assigned tender on March 12, re-signed April 23, placed on injured reserve September 1
DE	Shelby Harris	ERFA	Denver Broncos	assigned tender on March 9, re-signed April 16
LB	Joseph Jones	ERFA	Denver Broncos	assigned tender on March 12, re-signed April 16
LS	Casey Kreiter	ERFA	Denver Broncos	assigned tender on March 12, re-signed April 6
C	Matt Paradis	RFA	Denver Broncos	assigned tender on March 12, re-signed April 20 placed on injured reserve November 12
WR	Jordan Taylor	ERFA	Denver Broncos	assigned tender on March 12, re-signed April 16, placed on the PUP list September 1
OT	Elijah Wilkinson	ERFA	Denver Broncos	assigned tender on March 12, re-signed April 16

=== Signings ===
Position	Player	2017 Team	Notes
PK	Taylor Bertolet	None	signed March 21, waived April 30
CB	Tramaine Brock	Minnesota Vikings	signed March 14
WR	Corey Brown	Buffalo Bills	signed July 27, designated as waived/injured on August 15
WR	River Cracraft	Practice squad	promoted to the active roster on November 2
C	Gino Gradkowski	Carolina Panthers	signed November 12
TE	Temarrick Hemingway	Practice squad	promoted to the active roster on November 27
QB	Kevin Hogan	Cleveland Browns	claimed off waivers on September 2
WR	Andre Holmes	Buffalo Bills	claimed off waivers on December 5, placed on injured reserve December 28
CB	Adam Jones	Cincinnati Bengals	signed August 26, waived November 20
QB	Case Keenum	Minnesota Vikings	signed March 14
P	Marquette King	Oakland Raiders	signed April 5, released October 8
LS	Christian Kuntz	None	signed March 21, waived June 14
DT	Caushaud Lyons	None	signed June 15, waived September 1
DT	Clinton McDonald	Tampa Bay Buccaneers	signed March 21, released September 1
CB	Craig Mager	Los Angeles Chargers	signed December 19
TE	Brian Parker	None	promoted from the practice squad on September 29
CB	Horace Richardson	None	signed December 28
CB	C. J. Smith	Cleveland Browns	claimed off waivers on April 13, waived September 1
CB	Jamar Taylor	Cleveland Browns	signed December 4, two weeks after being released by the Arizona Cardinals
S	Shamarko Thomas	Buffalo Bills	signed August 13, released September 1, signed September 11, waived December 11
P	Colby Wadman	None	promoted from the practice squad to the active roster on October 6
LB	Aaron Wallace Jr.	None	signed December 28
WR	DeAndrew White	Houston Texans	claimed off waivers on August 15

=== Departures ===
Position	Player	Notes
RB	C. J. Anderson	released April 16
G	J. J. Dielman	designated as waived/injured on September 1
WR	Carlos Henderson	designated as Reserve/Did Not Report on July 25 suspended August 15 for one week for violating the league's substance abuse policy, waived September 1, assigned to the practice squad on September 3, released from the practice squad on September 13
CB	Michael Hunter	waived September 1
OT	Cyrus Kouandjio	released September 1, re-signed November 20, released December 4
CB	Brendan Langley	waived September 1 assigned to the practice squad on September 3, promoted to the active roster on November 20
QB	Chad Kelly	released October 24, one day after being arrested on criminal trespassing charges
QB	Paxton Lynch	waived September 2
WR	Isaiah McKenzie	waived September 1, re-signed September 2, waived September 10, assigned to the practice squad on September 12, promoted to the active roster on October 25, waived November 2
NT	Kyle Peko	waived September 1, assigned to the practice squad on September 3, waived September 11
CB	Marcus Rios	designated as waived/injured on September 1
TE	Austin Traylor	waived September 1

=== Trades ===
- April 23, Punter Riley Dixon was traded to the New York Giants in exchange for a conditional 2019 draft selection.
- October 30: Wide receiver Demaryius Thomas was traded to the Houston Texans in exchange for the Texans' 2019 fourth-round selection; in addition, the teams will swap 2019 seventh-round selections. Thomas ranks third in franchise history in receptions (behind Shannon Sharpe and Rod Smith), second in receiving yards, touchdowns and single-season receptions (all behind Rod Smith), tied with Anthony Miller for the most touchdowns in a single season, and holds the franchise records for 100-yard receiving games and receiving yardage for both a single-game and a single-season.

=== Draft ===
Despite early reports that the Broncos would draft a quarterback, plus the draft of several offensive players, the Broncos stayed with Case Keenum, Paxton Lynch and Chad Kelly going into mini-camps.

2018 Denver Broncos Draft
Round	Selection	Player	Position	College	Notes
1	5	Bradley Chubb	LB	NC State	signed June 21
2	40	Courtland Sutton	WR	SMU	signed May 10
3	71	Royce Freeman	RB	Oregon	signed July 5
3	99 *	Isaac Yiadom	CB	Boston College	signed May 26
4	106	Josey Jewell	LB	Iowa	signed May 10
4	113	DaeSean Hamilton	WR	Penn State	signed May 10
5	156	Troy Fumagalli	TE	Wisconsin	signed May 10, placed on injured reserve September 1
6	183	Sam Jones	G	Arizona State	signed May 10
6	217	Keishawn Bierria	LB	Washington	signed May 10
7	226	David Williams	RB	Arkansas	signed May 10, waived September 1, assigned to the practice squad on September 3

*	Compensatory selection

==== Draft trades ====
Trade partner	Broncos give	Broncos receive	Source
Arizona Cardinals	2018 sixth-round selection (No. 182)	Offensive tackle Jared Veldheer	
Atlanta Falcons	Offensive tackle Ty Sambrailo	2018 fifth-round selection (No. 163)	
Los Angeles Rams	Cornerback Aqib Talib	2018 fifth-round selection (No. 160 – later traded back to LAR)	
Los Angeles Rams	2018 fifth-round selection (No. 160)	Two 2018 sixth-round selections (Nos. 183 and 217)	
Minnesota Vikings	Quarterback Trevor Siemian; 2018 seventh-round selection (No. 225)	2019 fifth-round selection	
San Francisco 49ers	Running back Kapri Bibbs; 2017 fifth-round selection	2018 fourth-round selection (No. 109)	
Seattle Seahawks	2018 fifth-round selection (No. 149 – from WAS)	2018 fifth-round selection (No. 156); 2018 seventh-round selection (No. 226)	
Washington Redskins	2018 fourth-round selection (No. 109); Two 2018 fifth-round selections (Nos. 142 and 163)	Safety Su'a Cravens; 2018 fourth-round selection (No. 113); 2018 fifth-round selection (No. 149 – later traded to SEA)	

=== Undrafted free agents ===
All undrafted free agents were signed after the 2018 NFL draft concluded on April 28, unless noted otherwise.

2018 Denver Broncos undrafted free agents
Player	Position	College	Notes
WR	Bryce Bobo	Colorado	signed August 3, waived September 1
LB	Bo Bower	Iowa	signed June 15, waived August 26
WR	Mark Chapman	Central Michigan	signed July 26 waived September 1
WR	John Diarse	TCU	waived September 1
G/C	Nico Falah	USC	signed October 22
OT	Austin Fleer	Colorado Mesa	signed August 12 waived September 1
LB	Jeff Holland	Auburn	waived September 1, assigned to the practice squad on September 3, promoted to the active roster on November 30
LB	A. J. Johnson	Tennessee	suspended during his senior year in 2014 due to legal issues, signed August 13, made the Week 1 roster, waived November 30
OT	Leon Johnson	Temple	waived August 12
RB	Phillip Lindsay	Colorado	made the Week 1 roster
NT	Lowell Lotulelei	Ball State	waived May 14
S	Trey Marshall	Florida State	waived September 1, assigned to the practice squad on September 3, promoted to the active roster on December 11
DE	DeQuinton Osborne	Oklahoma State	signed August 15, waived September 1
C	Austin Schlottmann	TCU	waived September 1, assigned to the practice squad on September 3
DE	Antonio Simmons	Georgia Tech	signed June 15, waived September 1
QB	Nick Stevens	Colorado State	signed May 17, waived June 14
WR	Jimmy Williams	East Carolina	designated as Reserve/Did Not Report on July 25

=== Injuries ===
- May 30: Linebacker Deiontrez Mount ruptured his Achilles tendon during organized team activities (OTAs), and was ruled out for the 2018 season. Mount was designated as waived/injured on June 14.
- August 13: Safety Jamal Carter was placed on injured reserve, after suffering a torn hamstring during the team's first preseason game against the Minnesota Vikings.
- August 20: Offensive tackle Menelik Watson was placed on injured reserve due to a chest injury, and was released once he was declared healthy.
- September 2: Safety Su'a Cravens was placed on injured reserve due to a knee injury, with the designation to return to the roster after eight weeks, and was reinstated to the active roster on November 2, two days ahead of the Broncos' Week 9 game vs. the Houston Texans.
- September 27: Tight end Jake Butt suffered a torn ACL in his left knee during practice, and was placed on the season-ending injured reserve. This was the third knee injury that Butt has suffered – he tore the ACL in his right knee twice while at the University of Michigan (2014 and 2016), and missed his entire rookie season in 2017 while rehabbing from the second knee injury.
- October 6: Punter Marquette King was placed on injured reserve due to a thigh injury, and was released on October 8.
- October 14: Guard Ronald Leary ruptured his Achilles tendon during the team's Week 6 loss to the Los Angeles Rams, and was placed on injured reserve.
- October 28: Linebacker Brandon Marshall suffered a knee injury during the team's Week 8 loss to the Kansas City Chiefs, and returned to practice on November 28.
- November 4: Center Matt Paradis suffered a broken leg during the team's Week 9 loss to the Houston Texans, and was placed on injured reserve one week later, during the team's Week 10 bye.
- November 16: Guard Max Garcia suffered a torn ACL during practice – two days ahead of the team's Week 11 win over the Los Angeles Chargers, and was placed on injured reserve four days later (November 20).
- November 25: During the team's Week 12 win over the Pittsburgh Steelers, linebacker Shaquil Barrett sustained a tear in his hip flexor, and missed a few weeks. Also in Week 12, tight end Jeff Heuerman suffered three broken ribs and a bruised lung, and was placed on injured reserve two days later.
- December 2: Cornerback Chris Harris, Jr. suffered a broken fibula during the team's Week 13 win over the Cincinnati Bengals. He was not initially placed on injured reserve, and hoped to return to action if the Broncos had made the playoffs. However, after the Broncos were eliminated from postseason contention in Week 15, Harris was officially placed on injured reserve on December 19.
- December 5: Wide receiver Emmanuel Sanders ruptured his Achilles tendon during practice, and was placed on injured reserve.
- December 28: Running back Phillip Lindsay (wrist) and wide receiver Andre Holmes (ankle) were both injured during the team's Week 16 loss to the Oakland Raiders, and were placed on injured reserve ahead of the Broncos' final season game.

== Staff ==
2018 Denver Broncos staff
Front office: Owner – Pat Bowlen; President/CEO – Joe Ellis; President of football operations/general manager – John Elway; Director of player personnel – Matt Russell; Senior personnel advisor – Gary Kubiak; Director of pro personnel – A.J. Durso; Director of college scouting – Brian Stark; Director of football administration – Mike Sullivan; Director of team administration – Mark Thewes; Director of player development – Ray Jackson; Director of football analytics – Mitch Tanney; Head coaches: Head coach – Vance Joseph; Assistant to head coach – Rob Grosso; Offensive coaches: Offensive coordinator – Bill Musgrave; Quarterbacks – Mike Sullivan; Running backs – Curtis Modkins; Wide receivers – Zach Azzanni; Tight ends – Geep Chryst; Offensive line-guards/centers – Sean Kugler; Offensive line-tackles – Chris Strausser; Offensive assistant/quarterbacks – Klint Kubiak; Offensive quality control – Christopher Kragthorpe	Defensive coaches: Defensive coordinator – Joe Woods; Defensive line – Bill Kollar; Assistant defensive line – Chris Beake; Linebackers – Reggie Herring; Defensive backs – Marcus Robertson; Defensive backs – Greg Williams; Defensive quality control – Charles Gordon; Special teams coaches: Special teams coordinator – Tom McMahon; Assistant special teams – Chris Gould; Strength and conditioning: Head strength and conditioning – Loren Landow; Assistant strength and conditioning – Tyler Hill; Assistant strength and conditioning – Anthony Lomando; Assistant strength and conditioning – Cedric Smith

== Final roster ==
2018 Denver Broncos roster
Quarterbacks (QB): 9 Kevin Hogan; 4 Case Keenum; Running backs (RB): 23 Devontae Booker; 28 Royce Freeman; 32 Andy Janovich FB; Wide receivers (WR): 11 River Cracraft; 17 DaeSean Hamilton; 81 Tim Patrick; 14 Courtland Sutton; Tight ends (TE): 85 Temarrick Hemingway; 83 Matt LaCosse; 89 Brian Parker	Offensive linemen (OL): 72 Garett Bolles T; 74 Nico Falah G; 75 Gino Gradkowski C; 70 Sam Jones C; 60 Connor McGovern G/C; 77 Billy Turner G/T; 66 Jared Veldheer T; 68 Elijah Wilkinson G/T; Defensive linemen (DL): 99 Adam Gotsis DE; 96 Shelby Harris DE; 92 Zach Kerr NT; 94 Domata Peko NT; 57 DeMarcus Walker DE; 95 Derek Wolfe DE	Linebackers (LB): 48 Shaquil Barrett OLB; 40 Keishawn Bierria ILB; 55 Bradley Chubb OLB; 51 Todd Davis ILB; 46 Jeff Holland OLB; 47 Josey Jewell ILB; 43 Joseph Jones ILB; 54 Brandon Marshall ILB; 58 Von Miller OLB; 56 Shane Ray OLB; 50 Aaron Wallace Jr. OLB; Defensive backs (DB): 22 Tramaine Brock CB; 21 Su'a Cravens SS; 27 Brendan Langley CB; 49 Craig Mager CB; 36 Trey Marshall SS; 34 Will Parks SS; 38 Horace Richardson CB; 29 Bradley Roby CB; 31 Justin Simmons FS; 26 Darian Stewart SS; 39 Jamar Taylor CB; 35 Dymonte Thomas FS; 41 Isaac Yiadom CB; Special teams (ST): 42 Casey Kreiter LS; 8 Brandon McManus K; 3 Colby Wadman P	Practice squad: 12 Shay Fields WR; 5 Garrett Grayson QB; 16 Chad Hansen WR; 45 A. J. Johnson ILB; 73 Andreas Knappe T (IR); 97 Caushaud Lyons DE; 33 Khalfani Muhammad RB; 71 Austin Schlottmann C; 86 Tim Semisch TE; 78 Dan Skipper T; 37 Linden Stephens CB; Reserve: 80 Jake Butt TE (IR); 20 Jamal Carter SS (IR); 84 Troy Fumagalli TE (IR); 76 Max Garcia G (IR); 52 Jerrol Garcia-Williams OLB (IR); 25 Chris Harris Jr. CB (IR); 82 Jeff Heuerman TE (IR); 19 Andre Holmes WR (IR); 65 Ronald Leary G (IR); 30 Phillip Lindsay RB (IR); 53 Deiontrez Mount OLB (IR); 61 Matt Paradis C (IR); 10 Emmanuel Sanders WR (IR); 87 Jordan Taylor WR (PUP); Rookies in italics 53 active, 15 reserve, 10 practice squad

== Preseason ==
Week	Date	Opponent	Result	Record	Venue	Recap
1	August 11	Minnesota Vikings	L 28–42	0–1	Broncos Stadium at Mile High	Recap
2	August 18	Chicago Bears	L 23–24	0–2	Broncos Stadium at Mile High	Recap
3	August 23	at Washington Redskins	W 29–17	1–2	FedExField	Recap
4	August 30	at Arizona Cardinals	W 21–10	2–2	State Farm Stadium	Recap

== Regular season ==
=== Schedule ===
Week	Date	Opponent	Result	Record	Venue	Recap
1	September 9	Seattle Seahawks	**W** 27–24	1–0	Broncos Stadium at Mile High	Recap
2	September 16	**Oakland Raiders**	**W** 20–19	2–0	Broncos Stadium at Mile High	Recap
3	September 23	at Baltimore Ravens	**L** 14–27	2–1	M&T Bank Stadium	Recap
4	October 1	**Kansas City Chiefs**	**L** 23–27	2–2	Broncos Stadium at Mile High	Recap
5	October 7	at New York Jets	**L** 16–34	2–3	MetLife Stadium	Recap
6	October 14	Los Angeles Rams	**L** 20–23	2–4	Broncos Stadium at Mile High	Recap
7	October 18	at Arizona Cardinals	**W** 45–10	3–4	State Farm Stadium	Recap
8	October 28	at **Kansas City Chiefs**	**L** 23–30	3–5	Arrowhead Stadium	Recap
9	November 4	Houston Texans	**L** 17–19	3–6	Broncos Stadium at Mile High	Recap
10	Bye					
11	November 18	at **Los Angeles Chargers**	**W** 23–22	4–6	StubHub Center	Recap
12	November 25	Pittsburgh Steelers	**W** 24–17	5–6	Broncos Stadium at Mile High	Recap
13	December 2	at Cincinnati Bengals	**W** 24–10	6–6	Paul Brown Stadium	Recap
14	December 9	at San Francisco 49ers	**L** 14–20	6–7	Levi's Stadium	Recap
15	December 15	Cleveland Browns	**L** 16–17	6–8	Broncos Stadium at Mile High	Recap
16	December 24	at **Oakland Raiders**	**L** 14–27	6–9	Oakland–Alameda County Coliseum	Recap
17	December 30	**Los Angeles Chargers**	**L** 9–23	6–10	Broncos Stadium at Mile High	Recap

Note: Intra-division opponents are in bold text.

=== Game summaries ===
==== Week 1: vs. Seattle Seahawks ====
Week One: Seattle Seahawks at Denver Broncos – Game summary

Quarter	1	2	3	4	Total
Seahawks	7	3	7	7	**24**
**Broncos**	7	10	3	7	**27**

at Broncos Stadium at Mile High, Denver, Colorado

- Date: September 9
- Game time: 2:25 p.m. MDT
- Game weather: 84 °F (29 °C), sunny
- Game attendance: 76,761
- Referee: Brad Allen
- TV announcers (Fox): Dick Stockton, Mark Schlereth, and Jennifer Hale
- Recap, Gamebook

Game information

**First quarter**

- SEA – Will Dissly 15-yard pass from Russell Wilson (Sebastian Janikowski kick), 9:04. Seahawks 7–0. **Drive: 1 play, 15 yards, 0:06.**
- DEN – Phillip Lindsay 29-yard pass from Case Keenum (Brandon McManus kick), 6:10. Tied 7–7. **Drive: 7 plays, 75 yards, 2:54.**

**Second quarter**

- SEA – Sebastian Janikowski 35-yard field goal, 13:59. Seahawks 10–7. **Drive: 6 plays, 78 yards, 1:46.**
- DEN – Emmanuel Sanders 43-yard pass from Case Keenum (Brandon McManus kick), 10:29. Broncos 14–10. **Drive: 6 plays, 75 yards, 3:30.**
- DEN – Brandon McManus 51-yard field goal, 5:25. Broncos 17–10. **Drive: 6 plays, 30 yards, 2:33.**

**Third quarter**

- SEA – Brandon Marshall 20-yard pass from Russell Wilson (Sebastian Janikowski kick), 6:02. Tied 17–17. **Drive: 5 plays, 41 yards, 1:56.**
- DEN – Brandon McManus 53-yard field goal, 2:01. Broncos 20–17. **Drive: 4 plays, 0 yards, 0:54.**

**Fourth quarter**

- SEA – Tyler Lockett 51-yard pass from Russell Wilson (Sebastian Janikowski kick), 14:46. Seahawks 24–20. **Drive: 7 plays, 75 yards, 2:15.**
- DEN – Demaryius Thomas 4-yard pass from Case Keenum (Brandon McManus kick), 11:11. Broncos 27–24. **Drive: 7 plays, 75 yards, 3:35.**

**Top passers**

- SEA – Russell Wilson – 19/33, 298 yards, 3 TD, 2 INT
- DEN – Case Keenum – 25/39, 329 yards, 3 TD, 3 INT

**Top rushers**

- SEA – Chris Carson – 7 carries, 51 yards
- DEN – Philip Lindsay – 15 carries, 71 yards

**Top receivers**

- SEA – Will Dissly – 3 receptions, 105 yards, TD
- DEN – Emmanuel Sanders – 10 receptions, 135 yards, TD

For an eighth consecutive year, the Broncos kicked off the season at home, with the Seahawks as their Week 1 opponent. Following an interception of Broncos' quarterback Case Keenum by Seahawks' safety Earl Thomas midway through the first quarter, quarterback Russell Wilson connected with tight end Will Dissly on a 15-yard touchdown pass. The Broncos responded on their next possession, with Keenum throwing a 29-yard touchdown pass to running back Phillip Lindsay. After a 35-yard field goal by placekicker Sebastian Janikowski gave the Seahawks a 10–7 lead early in the second quarter, the Broncos claimed the lead with a 43-yard touchdown pass from Keenum to wide receiver Emmanuel Sanders. A 51-yard field goal by placekicker Brandon McManus later in the second quarter increased the Broncos' lead to 17–10. At the two-minute warning, Janikowski missed wide left on a 51-yard field goal, however, he got a second chance as the result of an offsides penalty on Broncos' cornerback Tramaine Brock. Janikowski missed wide left again on the second attempt – from 46 yards out. Three plays later, the Broncos' reached the Seahawks' 26-yard line, and were hoping to increase their lead heading into halftime, however, Keenum was intercepted by safety Bradley McDougald.

Following an exchange of turnovers midway through the third quarter – a fumble recovery by Broncos' linebacker Von Miller off Seahawks' running back Chris Carson and another interception of Keenum by McDougald, the Seahawks pulled even, with Wilson connecting with wide receiver Brandon Marshall on a 20-yard touchdown pass. Following an interception of Wilson by Broncos' safety Justin Simmons, a 53-yard field goal by McManus later in the third quarter gave the Broncos a 20–17 lead. On the second play of the fourth quarter, the Seahawks reclaimed the lead, with Wilson launching a 51-yard touchdown pass to wide receiver Tyler Lockett. The Broncos then drove 75 yards in seven plays, culminating in Keenum's third touchdown pass of the game – a 4-yarder to wide receiver Demaryius Thomas in the corner of the end zone with 11:18 remaining in the game. The play was reviewed by instant replay, but was upheld as the result of Demaryius Thomas keeping both of his toes in the end zone. Both teams punted on their next two possessions, and after the Seahawks were forced to burn all three of their team timeouts, they had one last possession with 1:01 remaining in the game, however, Wilson was intercepted by cornerback Adam Jones at the Seahawks' 40-yard line, ending the game. This marked the last time the Broncos beat the Seahawks until 2026.

==== Week 2: vs. Oakland Raiders ====
Week Two: Oakland Raiders at Denver Broncos – Game summary

Quarter	1	2	3	4	Total
Raiders	3	9	7	0	**19**
**Broncos**	0	0	10	10	**20**

at Broncos Stadium at Mile High, Denver, Colorado

- Date: September 16
- Game time: 2:25 pm. MDT
- Game weather: 92 °F (33 °C), sunny
- Game attendance: 76,696
- Referee: John Hussey
- TV announcers (CBS): Greg Gumbel, Trent Green, Bruce Arians, and Melanie Collins
- Recap, Gamebook

Game information

**First quarter**

- OAK – Mike Nugent 26-yard field goal, 9:33. Raiders 3–0. **Drive: 9 plays, 67 yards, 5:27.**

**Second quarter**

- OAK – Mike Nugent 46-yard field goal, 11:47. Raiders 6–0. **Drive: 9 plays, 43 yards, 4:54.**
- OAK – Marshawn Lynch 1-yard run (kick blocked), 0:35. Raiders 12–0. **Drive: 10 plays, 75 yards, 4:51.**

**Third quarter**

- DEN – Royce Freeman 1-yard run (Brandon McManus kick), 9:06. Raiders 12–7. **Drive: 11 plays, 75 yards, 5:54.**
- OAK – Seth Roberts 20-yard pass from Derek Carr (Mike Nugent kick), 5:25. Raiders 19–7. **Drive: 6 plays, 75 yards, 3:41.**
- DEN – Brandon McManus 39-yard field goal, 2:43. Raiders 19–10. **Drive: 10 plays, 54 yards, 2:42.**

**Fourth quarter**

- DEN – Case Keenum 1-yard run (Brandon McManus kick), 5:58. Raiders 19–17. **Drive: 14 plays, 67 yards, 7:08.**
- DEN – Brandon McManus 36-yard field goal, 0:06. Broncos 20–19. **Drive: 10 plays, 62 yards, 1:52.**

**Top passers**

- OAK – Derek Carr – 29/32, 288 yards, TD
- DEN – Case Keenum – 19/35, 222 yards, INT (1 rushing TD)

**Top rushers**

- OAK – Marshawn Lynch – 18 carries, 65 yards, TD
- DEN – Philip Lindsay – 14 carries, 107 yards

**Top receivers**

- OAK – Amari Cooper – 10 receptions, 116 yards
- DEN – Emmanuel Sanders – 4 receptions, 96 yards

The Broncos' offense went three-and-out on four of their six first half possessions. They reached the Raiders' 18-yard line on their fifth possession, which was aided by a 53-yard run by running back Phillip Lindsay, however, a pass attempt by quarterback Case Keenum intended for tight end Jake Butt near the goal line was intercepted by Raiders' cornerback Rashaan Melvin. The Raiders took a 12–0 lead on a pair of field goals by placekicker Mike Nugent – a 26-yarder on the opening drive followed by a 46-yarder early in the second quarter – and a 1-yard touchdown run by running back Marshawn Lynch just before halftime. The extra-point attempt on the Lynch touchdown was blocked by Broncos' linebacker Shaquil Barrett.

The Broncos got on the scoreboard on the opening possession of the second half, with a 1-yard touchdown run by running back Royce Freeman. The drive was kept alive by an unsportsmanlike conduct penalty on Raiders' linebacker Bruce Irvin, after the Raiders' defense had stopped the Broncos on third down at the 9-yard line. The Raiders responded on their next possession, with a 20-yard touchdown pass from quarterback Derek Carr to wide receiver Seth Roberts at the 5:31 mark of the third quarter. The Raiders were held scoreless for the remainder of the game, and the Broncos pulled to within a 19–10 deficit, with a 39-yard field goal by placekicker Brandon McManus. The Raiders then drove to the Broncos' 33-yard line, and faced a 4th-and-1, however, instead of kicking a long field goal, the Raiders opted for a short pass from Carr to fullback Keith Smith, which fell incomplete. The Broncos then assembled a 14-play, 67-yard drive, with Keenum diving for a 1-yard touchdown on a 4th-and-goal quarterback draw, narrowing the Raiders' lead to 19–17 with 6:02 remaining in the game. Keenum's run was reviewed, but upheld by instant replay. The Raiders gained two first downs, reached midfield and forced the Broncos to burn the last two of their three team timeouts, but were forced to punt just before the two-minute warning. Following an offensive holding penalty that drove the Broncos back to their own 10-yard line, Keenum engineered a 10-play, 62-yard drive, culminating in McManus kicking a game-winning 36-yard field goal with only 10 seconds left. The drive was keyed by a 26-yard completion from Keenum to wide receiver Tim Patrick, who evaded tackles by Raiders' cornerbacks Gareon Conley and Leon Hall, who unsuccessfully tried to keep Patrick from scampering out of bounds with both teams out of timeouts. The Broncos' defense thwarted the Raiders' last desperation play of the game.

Notes

With a temperature of 92 °F (33 °C), this was the hottest home game in Broncos' franchise history.

==== Week 3: at Baltimore Ravens ====
Week Three: Denver Broncos at Baltimore Ravens – Game summary

Quarter	1	2	3	4	Total
Broncos	14	0	0	0	**14**
**Ravens**	10	10	7	0	**27**

at M&T Bank Stadium, Baltimore, Maryland

- Date: September 23
- Game time: 1:00 p.m. EDT/11:00 am. MDT
- Game weather: 61 °F (16 °C), light rain
- Game attendance: 70,156
- Referee: Ronald Torbert
- TV announcers (CBS): Andrew Catalon, James Lofton, and Jane Slater
- Recap, Gamebook

Game information

**First quarter**

- DEN – Royce Freeman 6-yard run (Brandon McManus kick), 13:29. Broncos 7–0. **Drive: 1 play, 6 yards, 0:04.**
- BAL – Alex Collins 6-yard run (Justin Tucker kick), 10:57. Tied 7–7. **Drive: 5 plays, 48 yards, 2:32.**
- DEN – Emmanuel Sanders 35-yard run (Brandon McManus kick), 7:02. Broncos 14–7. **Drive: 8 plays, 70 yards, 3:55.**
- BAL – Justin Tucker 52-yard field goal, 3:38. Broncos 14–10. **Drive: 8 plays, 40 yards, 3:24.**

**Second quarter**

- BAL – Javorius Allen 12-yard pass from Joe Flacco (Justin Tucker kick), 8:26. Ravens 17–14. **Drive: 9 plays, 52 yards, 3:49.**
- BAL – Justin Tucker 52-yard field goal, 0:00. Ravens 20–14. **Drive: 4 plays, 16 yards, 0:26.**

**Third quarter**

- BAL – Javorius Allen 1-yard run (Justin Tucker kick), 7:26. Ravens 27–14. **Drive: 14 plays, 82 yards, 6:19.**

**Fourth quarter**

- No scoring plays.

**Top passers**

- DEN – Case Keenum – 22/34, 192 yards, INT
- BAL – Joe Flacco – 25/40, 277 yards, TD

**Top rushers**

- DEN – Royce Freeman – 13 rushes, 53 yards, TD
- BAL – Alex Collins – 18 rushes, 68 yards, TD

**Top receivers**

- DEN – Demaryius Thomas – 5 receptions, 63 yards
- BAL – Javorius Allen – 5 receptions, 86 yards

In their first road game of the season, the Broncos were plagued by several penalties, in a 27–14 loss at the Baltimore Ravens. After Ravens' punter Sam Koch has his punt blocked by Joseph Jones on the opening possession of the game, the Broncos grabbed the early lead on the next play, with a 6-yard touchdown run by running back Royce Freeman. The Ravens countered, with running back Alex Collins rushing for a 6-yard touchdown. The drive started at the Broncos' 48-yard line, after Broncos' cornerback Isaac Yiadom was flagged for an unnecessary roughness penalty while on the sidelines. The Broncos grabbed a 14–7 lead on their next possession, with a 35-yard touchdown run by wide receiver Emmanuel Sanders on an end-around. However, the Broncos were held scoreless for the remainder of the game. The Ravens pulled to within a 14–10 deficit late in the first quarter, with a 52-yard field goal by placekicker Justin Tucker, and took the lead for good midway through the second quarter, with a 12-yard touchdown pass from quarterback Joe Flacco to running back Javorius Allen. The play was initially ruled down at the 1-yard line, but changed by instant replay. After the Broncos went three-and-out, the Ravens were attempting to add to their lead, but Tucker's 43-yard field goal attempt was blocked by Justin Simmons and recovered by Chris Harris, Jr., who scampered down the sideline for a touchdown. However, Harris' touchdown was nullified by an illegal block penalty on the return by Billy Turner, pushing back the first play of scrimmage of the Broncos' next drive back to near midfield. Three plays later, the Broncos reached the Ravens' 25-yard line, however, on the fourth play, Ravens' linebacker Terrell Suggs forced a fumble off Broncos' quarterback Case Keenum, and running back Phillip Lindsay was ejected from the game just before the two-minute warning for unsportsmanlike conduct while trying to recover the fumble. This pushed the Broncos out of field goal range, and another field 52-yard field goal by Tucker gave the Ravens a 20–14 lead at halftime.

The Ravens added to their lead on their first possession of the second half, with a 1-yard run by Allen, which was the final scoring play of the game. The drive was aided by a defensive offsides penalty on Broncos' defensive end Derek Wolfe on a 3rd-and-4. The Broncos committed three costly penalties on their next drive – offensive holding on Garett Bolles that negated a 39-yard pass completion from Keenum to wide receiver Demaryius Thomas at the Ravens' 11-yard line, a holding call on Connor McGovern at the Ravens' 31-yard line and an unnecessary roughness flag on Ronald Leary that pushed the Broncos out of field goal range. The Broncos reached the Ravens' 5-yard line on their first possession of the fourth quarter, but Keenum was intercepted by Patrick Onwuasor, who ran 89 yards for a touchdown. However, the touchdown was nullified by an illegal block on the return. The Broncos had one more possession, but turned the football over on downs with three minutes remaining in the game, and the Ravens ran out the clock.

==== Week 4: vs. Kansas City Chiefs ====
Week Four: Kansas City Chiefs at Denver Broncos – Game summary

Quarter	1	2	3	4	Total
**Chiefs**	3	7	3	14	**27**
Broncos	3	10	7	3	**23**

at Broncos Stadium at Mile High, Denver, Colorado

- Date: October 1
- Game time: 6:15 pm. MDT
- Game weather: 65 °F (18 °C), cloudy
- Game attendance: 76,656
- Referee: Craig Wrolstad
- TV announcers (ESPN/KTVD): Joe Tessitore, Jason Witten, Booger McFarland, and Lisa Salters
- Recap, Gamebook

Game information

**First quarter**

- DEN – Brandon McManus 42-yard field goal, 11:33. Broncos 3–0. **Drive: 7 plays, 51 yards, 3:27.**
- KC – Harrison Butker 33-yard field goal, 6:03. Tied 3–3. **Drive: 10 plays, 60 yards, 5:30.**

**Second quarter**

- KC – Patrick Mahomes 8-yard run (Harrison Butker kick), 9:33. Chiefs 10–3. **Drive: 12 plays, 89 yards, 5:39.**
- DEN – Royce Freeman 13-yard run (Brandon McManus kick), 6:37. Tied 10–10. **Drive: 5 plays, 78 yards, 2:56.**
- DEN – Brandon McManus 34-yard field goal, 0:00. Broncos 13–10. **Drive: 12 plays, 60 yards, 2:17.**

**Third quarter**

- KC – Harrison Butker 21-yard field goal, 9:32. Tied 13–13. **Drive: 12 plays, 72 yards, 5:28.**
- DEN – Phillip Lindsay 1-yard run (Brandon McManus kick), 2:05. Broncos 20–13. **Drive: 9 plays, 80 yards, 4:33.**

**Fourth quarter**

- DEN – Brandon McManus 46-yard field goal, 12:47. Broncos 23–13. **Drive: 6 plays, 48 yards, 2:43.**
- KC – Travis Kelce 2-yard pass from Patrick Mahomes (Harrison Butker kick), 6:27. Broncos 23–20. **Drive: 12 plays, 75 yards, 6:20.**
- KC – Kareem Hunt 4-yard run (Harrison Butker kick), 1:39. Chiefs 27–23. **Drive: 8 plays, 60 yards, 2:56.**

**Top passers**

- KC – Patrick Mahomes – 28/45, 304 yards, TD
- DEN – Case Keenum – 21/33, 245 yards, INT

**Top rushers**

- KC – Kareem Hunt – 19 carries, 121 yards, TD
- DEN – Phillip Lindsay – 12 carries, 69 yards, TD

**Top receivers**

- KC – Tyreek Hill – 9 receptions, 54 yards
- DEN – Emmanuel Sanders – 5 receptions, 45 yards

After an exchange of field goals in the first quarter – a 42-yarder by Broncos placekicker Brandon McManus and a 33-yarder by Chiefs' placekicker Harrison Butker, Chiefs' quarterback Patrick Mahomes scrambled for an 8-yard touchdown and Broncos' running back Royce Freeman ran for a 14-yard touchdown – both midway through the second quarter. A 34-yard field goal by McManus just before halftime gave the Broncos a 13–10 lead. A 21-yard field goal by Butker on the Chiefs' opening possession of the second half tied the game. A 1-yard touchdown run by running back Phillip Lindsay later in the third quarter, coupled with a 46-yard field goal by McManus early in the fourth quarter gave the Broncos a 23–13 lead. Mahomes then engineered a 12-play, 75-yard drive, culminating in a 2-yard touchdown pass to tight end Travis Kelce to narrow the Broncos lead to 23–20 with 6:30 remaining in the game. After the Broncos went three-and-out, the Chiefs grabbed a 27–23 lead, with a 4-yard touchdown pass to running back Kareem Hunt. The drive featured a critical third-down conversion, in which Mahomes threw left-handed to wide receiver Tyreek Hill while being pursued out of bounds by Broncos' linebackers Von Miller and Shane Ray. The drive was also marred with controversy, in which the Broncos claimed that the referees missed a delay-of-game call on a critical third-down play. With 1:39 remaining in the game and no timeouts, the Broncos attempted a rally, and reached the Chiefs' 28-yard line with 32 seconds remaining after a 36-yard completion from quarterback Case Keenum to tight end Jeff Heuerman. On the next play, Keenum overthrew wide receiver Demaryius Thomas down the sideline on a potential game-winning touchdown. With 16 seconds left, and facing a 4th-and-10, Keenum completed a pass to wide receiver Courtland Sutton, and Sutton attempted a hook-and-lateral, which was fumbled and recovered by Chiefs' defensive end Justin Houston, but ruled incomplete after instant replay, ending the Broncos' rally attempt.

Notes

This was the first of two games in which the Broncos wore their alternate navy blue jerseys – the other was Week 15 vs. the Cleveland Browns.

==== Week 5: at New York Jets ====
Week Five: Denver Broncos at New York Jets – Game summary

Quarter	1	2	3	4	Total
Broncos	7	3	0	6	**16**
**Jets**	0	21	3	10	**34**

at MetLife Stadium, East Rutherford, New Jersey

- Date: October 7
- Game time: 1:00 pm. EDT/11:00 am. MDT
- Game weather: 77 °F (25 °C), cloudy
- Game attendance: 77,982
- Referee: Pete Morelli
- TV announcers (CBS): Ian Eagle, Dan Fouts, and Evan Washburn
- Recap, Gamebook

Game information

**First quarter**

- DEN – Courtland Sutton 8-yard pass from Case Keenum (Brandon McManus kick), 9:19. Broncos 7–0. **Drive: 3 plays, 20 yards, 1:15.**

**Second quarter**

- NYJ – Isaiah Crowell 77-yard run (Jason Myers kick), 13:57. Tied 7–7. **Drive: 1 play, 77 yards, 0:12.**
- NYJ – Robby Anderson 76-yard pass from Sam Darnold (Jason Myers kick), 10:46. Jets 14–7. **Drive: 3 plays, 76 yards, 0:50.**
- DEN – Brandon McManus 30-yard field goal, 3:58. Jets 14–10. **Drive: 11 plays, 79 yards, 4:04.**
- NYJ – Robby Anderson 35-yard pass from Sam Darnold (Jason Myers kick), 1:13. Jets 21–10. **Drive: 8 plays, 75 yards, 2:45.**

**Third quarter**

- NYJ – Jason Myers 49-yard field goal, 4:52. Jets 24–10. **Drive: 13 plays, 64 yards, 6:34.**

**Fourth quarter**

- NYJ – Jason Myers 30-yard field goal, 12:59. Jets 27–10. **Drive: 4 plays, –1 yard, 2:01.**
- NYJ – Terrelle Pryor 20-yard pass from Sam Darnold, 5:10. Jets 34–10. **Drive: 6 plays, 93 yards, 3:54.**
- DEN – Demaryius Thomas 42-yard pass from Case Keenum (pass failed), 3:18. Jets 34–16. **Drive: 7 plays, 75 yards, 1:52.**

**Top passers**

- DEN – Case Keenum – 35/51, 377 yards, 2 TD, INT
- NYJ – Sam Darnold – 10/22, 198 yards, 3 TD, INT

**Top rushers**

- DEN – Phillip Lindsay – 12 rushes, 61 yards
- NYJ – Isaiah Crowell – 15 rushes, 219 yards, TD

**Top receivers**

- DEN – Demaryius Thomas – 5 receptions, 105 yards, TD
- NYJ – Robby Anderson – 3 receptions, 123 yards, 2 TD

After forcing a fumble on the Jets' opening drive, the Broncos took the early lead, with an 8-yard touchdown pass from quarterback Case Keenum to wide receiver Courtland Sutton. However, the Jets took control of the game in the second quarter. The Broncos' defense allowed Jets' running back Isaiah Crowell to rush for 219 yards, including a 77-yard touchdown, and quarterback Sam Darnold threw three touchdown passes – including a 76-yarder to wide receiver Robby Anderson. From the second quarter onward, the Broncos' offense only managed a 30-yard field goal by placekicker Brandon McManus and a 42-yard touchdown pass from Keenum to wide receiver Demaryius Thomas – the latter of which occurred after the game had been decided in the Jets' favor.

==== Week 6: vs. Los Angeles Rams ====
Week Six: Los Angeles Rams at Denver Broncos – Game summary

Quarter	1	2	3	4	Total
**Rams**	6	7	7	3	**23**
Broncos	3	0	7	10	**20**

at Broncos Stadium at Mile High, Denver, Colorado

- Date: October 14
- Game time: 2:05 pm. MDT
- Game weather: 25 °F (−4 °C), mostly cloudy
- Game attendance: 76,109
- Referee: Shawn Smith
- TV announcers (Fox): Dick Stockton, Mark Schlereth, and Jennifer Hale
- Recap, Gamebook

Game information

**First quarter**

- LAR – Cairo Santos 26-yard field goal, 11:23. Rams 3–0. **Drive: 7 plays, 63 yards, 2:03.**
- LAR – Cairo Santos 39-yard field goal, 4:21. Rams 6–0. **Drive: 9 plays, 71 yards, 4:26.**
- DEN – Brandon McManus 28-yard field goal, 0:03. Rams 6–3. **Drive: 9 plays, 65 yards, 4:18.**

**Second quarter**

- LAR – Todd Gurley 10-yard run (Cairo Santos kick), 10:57. Rams 13–3. **Drive: 7 plays, 66 yards, 4:06.**

**Third quarter**

- LAR – Todd Gurley 1-yard run (Cairo Santos kick), 6:09. Rams 20–3. **Drive: 8 plays, 58 yards, 4:00.**
- DEN – Emmanuel Sanders 22-yard pass from Case Keenum (Brandon McManus kick), 1:34. Rams 20–10. **Drive: 1 play, 12 yards, 0:31.**

**Fourth quarter**

- DEN – Brandon McManus 24-yard field goal, 8:54. Rams 20–13. **Drive: 5 plays, 57 yards, 1:20.**
- LAR – Cairo Santos 21-yard field goal, 3:15. Rams 23–13. **Drive: 13 plays, 72 yards, 5:39.**
- DEN – Demaryius Thomas 1-yard pass from Case Keenum (Brandon McManus kick), 1:22. Rams 23–20. **Drive: 9 plays, 77 yards, 1:53.**

**Top passers**

- LAR – Jared Goff – 14/28, 201 yards, INT
- DEN – Case Keenum – 25/41, 322 yards, 2 TD, INT

**Top rushers**

- LAR – Todd Gurley – 28 rushes, 208 yards, 2 TD
- DEN – Royce Freeman – 9 rushes, 22 yards

**Top receivers**

- LAR – Robert Woods – 7 rushes, 109 yards
- DEN – Emmanuel Sanders – 7 rushes, 115 yards, TD

The Rams took an early 6–0 lead, with a pair of field goals by placekicker Cairo Santos – a 26- and a 39-yarder. Near the end of the first quarter, quarterback Case Keenum completed what was initially ruled as a 44-yard touchdown pass to wide receiver Emmanuel Sanders, who was immediately flagged for a taunting penalty against Rams' cornerback Troy Hill, which would have been penalized on the kickoff. However, instant replay determined that Sanders was ruled down at the 1-yard line by contact, where the unsportsmanlike conduct penalty was assessed. The Broncos were forced to settle for a 28-yard field goal by placekicker Brandon McManus. A 10-yard touchdown run by Rams' running back Todd Gurley was the only scoring play of the second quarter. The Broncos reached the Rams' 28-yard line on the first possession of the second quarter, only to have a holding penalty on offensive tackle Garett Bolles push them out of field goal range. Following an exchange of punts to start the second half, the Rams increased their lead to 20–3, with a 1-yard run by Gurley. On the Rams' next possession, quarterback Jared Goff was intercepted by Broncos' safety Darian Stewart on a deflected pass deep in Rams' territory, and two plays later, Keenum connected with Sanders on a 22-yard touchdown pass near the end of the third quarter. After forcing a Rams' punt, the Broncos reached the 6-yard line, but were forced to settle for a 24-yard field goal by McManus at the 8:57 mark of the fourth quarter. The Broncos' defense prevented the Rams defense from reaching the end zone, however, Santos responded with a 21-yard field goal to give the Rams a 23–13 lead with 3:19 remaining. Without any timeouts, the Broncos reached the end zone in nine plays, and pulled to within a 23–20 deficit, with a 1-yard touchdown pass from Keenum to wide receiver Demaryius Thomas with 1:27 remaining in the game, in what would be Thomas' final touchdown as a Denver Bronco. However, the onside kick attempt was unsuccessful, and the Rams ran out the clock.

This was Demaryius Thomas' final home game at Broncos Stadium at Mile High as a Bronco, as he would be traded to the Houston Texans on October 30.

==== Week 7: at Arizona Cardinals ====
Week Seven: Denver Broncos at Arizona Cardinals – Game summary

Quarter	1	2	3	4	Total
**Broncos**	21	14	7	3	**45**
Cardinals	3	0	7	0	**10**

at State Farm Stadium, Glendale, Arizona

- Date: October 18
- Game time: 6:20 pm. MDT/5:20 pm. MST
- Game weather: Played indoors (retractable roof closed)
- Game attendance: 62,359
- Referee: Alex Kemp
- TV announcers (Fox/NFLN): Joe Buck, Troy Aikman, Erin Andrews Kristina Pink, and Mike PereiraAmazon Video: Hannah Storm and Andrea Kremer
- Recap, Gamebook

Game information

**First quarter**

- DEN – Todd Davis 20-yard interception return (Brandon McManus kick), 14:01. Broncos 7–0.
- DEN – Courtland Sutton 28-yard pass from Emmanuel Sanders (Brandon McManus kick), 8:38. Broncos 14–0. **Drive: 6 plays, 77 yards, 3:41.**
- ARI – Phil Dawson 43-yard field goal, 5:18. Broncos 14–3.**Drive: 9 plays, 61 yards, 3:20.**
- DEN – Chris Harris, Jr. 53-yard interception return (Brandon McManus kick), 2:02. Broncos 21–3.

**Second quarter**

- DEN – Emmanuel Sanders 64-yard pass from Case Keenum (Brandon McManus kick), 14:40. Broncos 28–3. **Drive: 1 play, 64 yards, 0:11.**
- DEN – Royce Freeman 1-yard run (Brandon McManus kick), 0:21. Broncos 35–3. **Drive: 15 plays, 70 yards, 6:39.**

**Third quarter**

- ARI – Larry Fitzgerald 4-yard pass from Josh Rosen (Phil Dawson kick), 8:33. Broncos 35–10. **Drive: 11 plays, 63 yards, 4:11.**
- DEN – Phillip Lindsay 28-yard run (Brandon McManus kick), 3:32. Broncos 42–10. **Drive: 3 plays, 43 yards, 1:35.**

**Fourth quarter**

- DEN – Brandon McManus 41-yard field goal, 5:35. Broncos 45–10. **Drive: 4 plays, –11 yards, 2:13.**

**Top passers**

- DEN – Case Keenum – 14/21, 161 yards, TD, INT
- ARI – Josh Rosen – 21/39, 194 yards, TD, 3 INT

**Top rushers**

- DEN – Phillip Lindsay – 14 rushes, 90 yards, TD
- ARI – David Johnson – 14 rushes, 39 yards

**Top receivers**

- DEN – Emmanuel Sanders – 6 receptions, 102 yards, TD
- ARI – Christian Kirk – 3 receptions, 57 yards

The Broncos' defense returned two interceptions off Cardinals' quarterback Josh Rosen for touchdowns in the first quarter – one by linebacker Todd Davis and the other by cornerback Chris Harris, Jr., and wide receiver Emmanuel Sanders received and threw a touchdown pass, in a 45–10 rout of the Cardinals. Running backs Royce Freeman and Phillip Lindsay each rushed for a touchdown, and after surrendering a combined 593 rushing yards in their previous two games against the Los Angeles Rams and New York Jets, the Broncos' defense allowed only 69 rushing yards.

Notes

The Broncos improved their all-time series record against the Cardinals to 9–1–1. This was the only game during the 2018 season in which the Broncos scored 30 or more points.

==== Week 8: at Kansas City Chiefs ====
Week Eight: Denver Broncos at Kansas City Chiefs – Game summary

Quarter	1	2	3	4	Total
Broncos	7	7	0	9	**23**
**Chiefs**	3	13	14	0	**30**

at Arrowhead Stadium, Kansas City, Missouri

- Date: October 28
- Game time: 12:00 p.m. CDT/11:00 am. MDT
- Game weather: 56 °F (13 °C), clear and sunny
- Game attendance: 77,103
- Referee: Shawn Hochuli
- TV announcers (CBS): Kevin Harlan, Rich Gannon, and Steve Tasker
- Recap, Gamebook

Game information

**First quarter**

- DEN – Phillip Lindsay 1-yard run (Brandon McManus kick), 7:40. Broncos 7–0. **Drive: 8 plays, 81 yards, 4:17.**
- KC – Harrison Butker 24-yard field goal, 2:18. Broncos 7–3. **Drive: 11 plays, 57 yards, 5:22.**

**Second quarter**

- KC – Travis Kelce 9-yard pass from Patrick Mahomes (Harrison Butker kick), 9:31. Chiefs 10–7. **Drive: 4 plays, 55 yards, 2:10.**
- KC – Sammy Watkins 13-yard pass from Patrick Mahomes (kick failed, wide left), 0:54. Chiefs 16–7. **Drive: 8 plays, 92 yards, 4:24.**
- DEN – Tim Patrick 24-yard pass from Case Keenum (Brandon McManus kick), 0:05. Chiefs 16–14. **Drive: 5 plays, 75 yards, 0:49.**

**Third quarter**

- KC – Sammy Watkins 10-yard pass from Patrick Mahomes (Harrison Butker kick), 10:16. Chiefs 23–14. **Drive: 9 plays, 83 yards, 4:44.**
- KC – Kareem Hunt 23-yard pass from Patrick Mahomes (Harrison Butker kick), 5:12. Chiefs 30–14. **Drive: 4 plays, 32 yards, 1:53.**

**Fourth quarter**

- DEN – Jeff Heuerman 4-yard pass from Case Keenum (run failed), 14:57. Chiefs 30–20. **Drive: 12 plays, 75 yards, 5:15.**
- DEN – Brandon McManus 36-yard field goal, 1:48. Chiefs 30–23. **Drive: 10 plays, 46 yards, 2:12.**

**Top passers**

- DEN – Case Keenum – 23/34, 262 yards, 2 TD, INT
- KC – Patrick Mahomes – 24/34, 303 yards, 4 TD, INT

**Top rushers**

- DEN – Phillip Lindsay – 18 rushes, 95 yards, TD
- KC – Kareem Hunt – 16 rushes, 50 yards, receiving TD

**Top receivers**

- DEN – Courtland Sutton – 3 receptions, 78 yards
- KC – Sammy Watkins – 8 receptions, 107 yards, 2 TD

For the second time in the month of October, the Broncos faced their AFC West rival Kansas City Chiefs. A 1-yard touchdown run by running back Phillip Lindsay gave the Broncos the early lead. The Chiefs got on the board, with a 24-yard field goal by placekicker Harrison Butker, a drive that was aided by a defensive pass interference penalty on Broncos cornerback Bradley Roby on a 3rd-and-19. Broncos' placekicker Brandon McManus missed wide right on a 55-yard field goal attempt, one play after wide receiver Emmanuel Sanders was tackled for a 6-yard loss on an end-around. The Chiefs took the lead in the second quarter with two touchdown passes by quarterback Patrick Mahomes – a 9-yarder to tight end Travis Kelce and a 13-yarder to wide receiver Sammy Watkins – the latter with a missed extra point attempt. The Broncos pulled to within a 16–14 deficit just before halftime, with quarterback Case Keenum connecting with wide receiver Tim Patrick on a 24-yard touchdown pass. The Chiefs then increased their lead to 30–14 on their first two possessions of the second half, with two more touchdown passes by Mahomes – a 10-yarder to Watkins, followed by a 23-yarder to running back Kareem Hunt.

On the first play of the fourth quarter, the Broncos responded, with Keenum throwing a 4-yard touchdown pass to tight end Jeff Heuerman. However, the two-point conversion attempt was unsuccessful, which would have pulled the Broncos to within a one-score deficit. The Broncos' defense forced a turnover on the Chiefs' next possession, with safety Justin Simmons intercepting a pass from Mahomes at the Broncos' 39-yard line. However, four plays later, after the Broncos had reached the Chiefs' 39-yard line, Keenum was strip-sacked by Dee Ford, with Chiefs' linebacker Breeland Speaks recovering the fumble. The Broncos' defense forced a Chiefs punt, however, on the next possession, Keenum was intercepted by cornerback Kendall Fuller near midfield. Following an exchange of punts, and after burning two of their three team timeouts, the Broncos drove 46 yards in ten plays, with a 36-yard field goal by McManus pulling the Broncos to within a 30–23 deficit just after the two-minute warning. The Broncos' defense forced a three-and-out from the Chiefs, and the Broncos had one last offensive play, however, with only four seconds left and no timeouts, their last desperation play of the game was unsuccessful.

Notes

This was Demaryius Thomas' final game as a Bronco, as he would be traded two days later on October 30 to the Houston Texans, who Denver would host in their following game.

The Broncos lost their seventh consecutive game against the Chiefs – surpassing the team's longest losing skid against the Chiefs since a six-game streak from 1970 to 1973.

==== Week 9: vs. Houston Texans ====
Week Nine: Houston Texans at Denver Broncos – Game summary

Quarter	1	2	3	4	Total
**Texans**	7	9	0	3	**19**
Broncos	3	7	7	0	**17**

at Broncos Stadium at Mile High, Denver, Colorado

- Date: November 4
- Game time: 2:05 pm. MST
- Game weather: 53 °F (12 °C), cloudy
- Game attendance: 76,270
- Referee: Clay Martin
- TV announcers (CBS): Tom McCarthy and Steve Beuerlein
- Recap, Gamebook

Game information

**First quarter**

- HOU – Jordan Thomas 7-yard pass from Deshaun Watson (Kaʻimi Fairbairn kick), 10:53. Texans 7–0. **Drive: 8 plays, 75 yards, 4:07.**
- DEN – Brandon McManus 44-yard field goal, 4:42. Texans 7–3. **Drive: 8 plays, 25 yards, 3:12.**

**Second quarter**

- HOU – DeAndre Hopkins 16-yard pass from Deshaun Watson (kick failed, wide right), 11:05. Texans 13–3. **Drive: 3 plays, 22 yards, 1:19.**
- DEN – Devontae Booker 14-yard run (Brandon McManus kick), 5:33. Texans 13–10. **Drive: 4 plays, 87 yards, 2:30.**
- HOU – Kaʻimi Fairbairn 46-yard field goal, 0:00. Texans 16–10. **Drive: 3 plays, 20 yards, 0:18.**

**Third quarter**

- DEN – Jeff Heuerman 12-yard pass from Case Keenum (Brandon McManus kick), 5:57. Broncos 17–16. **Drive: 12 plays, 81 yards, 5:56.**

**Fourth quarter**

- HOU – Kaʻimi Fairbairn 37-yard field goal, 14:06. Texans 19–17. **Drive: 13 plays, 56 yards, 6:51.**

**Top passers**

- HOU – Deshaun Watson – 17/24, 213 yards, 2 TD
- DEN – Case Keenum – 26/42, 290 yards, TD

**Top rushers**

- HOU – Alfred Blue – 15 rushes, 39 yards
- DEN – Phillip Lindsay – 17 rushes, 60 yards

**Top receivers**

- HOU – DeAndre Hopkins – 10 rushes, 105 yards, TD
- DEN – Jeff Heuerman – 10 receptions, 83 yards, TD

The Texans took the lead on their game's opening drive, with a 7-yard touchdown pass from quarterback Deshaun Watson to tight end Jordan Thomas. A 44-yard field goal by Broncos' placekicker Brandon McManus put the Broncos on the scoreboard. However, after running back Devontae Booker lost a fumble deep in Broncos' territory early in the second quarter, the Texans capitalized, with Watson connecting with wide receiver DeAndre Hopkins on a 16-yard touchdown (with a missed extra point attempt). Following an exchange of punts, Booker redeemed himself, with a 14-yard touchdown run. With only 22 seconds remaining in the first half, McManus missed wide right on a 62-yard field goal attempt, giving the Texans a short field and an opportunity to score. Broncos' head coach Vance Joseph attempted to ice Texans' placekicker Kaʻimi Fairbairn prior to attempting a half-ending 46-yard field goal. The initial attempt missed wide right, but Fairbairn's second attempt was successful, giving the Texans a 16–10 lead. The Broncos took their first and only lead of the game, with quarterback Case Keenum throwing a 12-yard touchdown pass to tight end Jeff Heuerman, which was the only scoring play of the third quarter. The Texans reclaimed the lead early in the fourth quarter, with a 37-yard field goal by Fairbairn. The drive was extended as the result of a defensive holding penalty on Broncos' safety Su'a Cravens on a third-down play. Following an exchange of punts, the Broncos, trailing 19–17, had one last offensive possession, and reached the Texans' 33-yard line, however, McManus missed wide right on a 51-yard field goal as time expired.

Notes

Wide receiver Demaryius Thomas, who was traded by the Broncos to the Texans earlier in the week, made his debut in a Texans' uniform.

==== Week 11: at Los Angeles Chargers ====
Week Eleven: Denver Broncos at Los Angeles Chargers – Game summary

Quarter	1	2	3	4	Total
**Broncos**	0	7	7	9	**23**
Chargers	6	7	6	3	**22**

at Stubhub Center, Carson, California

- Date: November 18
- Game time: 2:05 pm. MST/1:05 p.m. PST
- Game weather: 69 °F (21 °C), clear
- Game attendance: 25,462
- Referee: Pete Morelli
- TV announcers (CBS): Ian Eagle, Dan Fouts, and Evan Washburn
- Recap, Gamebook

Game information

**First quarter**

- LAC – Michael Badgley 46-yard field goal, 7:00. Chargers 3–0. **Drive: 13 plays, 52 yards, 6:47.**
- LAC – Michael Badgley 45-yard field goal, 0:39. Chargers 6–0. **Drive: 8 plays, 55 yards, 4:04.**

**Second quarter**

- DEN – Phillip Lindsay 41-yard run (Brandon McManus kick), 12:05. Broncos 7–6. **Drive: 7 plays, 70 yards, 3:34.**
- LAC – Keenan Allen 4-yard pass from Philip Rivers (Michael Badgley kick), 2:39. Chargers 13–7. **Drive: 9 plays, 84 yards, 4:14.**

**Third quarter**

- LAC – Antonio Gates 6-yard pass from Philip Rivers (kick failed, wide left), 9:56. Chargers 19–7. **Drive: 9 plays, 75 yards, 5:04.**
- DEN – Royce Freeman 3-yard run (Brandon McManus kick), 2:24. Chargers 19–14. **Drive: 3 plays, 18 yards, 1:21.**

**Fourth quarter**

- DEN – Phillip Lindsay 2-yard run (run failed), 12:17. Broncos 20–19. **Drive: 7 plays, 73 yards, 3:33.**
- LAC – Michael Badgley 30-yard field goal, 6:47. Chargers 22–20. **Drive: 8 plays, 60 yards, 5:30.**
- DEN – Brandon McManus 34-yard field goal, 0:00. Broncos 23–22. **Drive: 7 plays, 76 yards, 1:51.**

**Top passers**

- DEN – Case Keenum – 19/32, 205 yards
- LAC – Philip Rivers – 28/43, 401 yards, 2 TD, 2 INT

**Top rushers**

- DEN – Phillip Lindsay – 11 rushes, 79 yards, 2 TD
- LAC – Melvin Gordon – 18 rushes, 69 yards

**Top receivers**

- DEN – Courtland Sutton – 3 receptions, 78 yards
- LAC – Keenan Allen – 9 receptions, 89 yards

A pair of first quarter field goals by placekicker Michael Badgley – from 46 and 45 yards out – gave the Chargers the early lead. The Broncos grabbed the lead early in the second quarter, with a 41-yard touchdown run by running back Phillip Lindsay. On the next possession, Chargers' quarterback Philip Rivers was intercepted by cornerback Chris Harris, Jr., giving the Broncos the football near midfield. However, on the fifth play of the drive, the Broncos opted to convert a 4th-and-1 at the Chargers' 16-yard line instead of kicking a field goal, but Lindsay was stopped for no gain. The Chargers regained the lead on their next possession, with Rivers connecting on a 4-yard touchdown pass to wide receiver Keenan Allen, one play after Rivers was nearly intercepted in the end zone on a deflected pass.

The Chargers took the opening possession of the second half and added to their lead, with Rivers throwing his second touchdown pass – a 6-yarder to tight end Antonio Gates. However, Badgley missed wide left on the extra point attempt, keeping the score at 19–7. The Broncos went three and out on their first offensive possession of the second half, and the Chargers were attempting to pull away from the Broncos on their next possession. However, as the Chargers reached the Broncos' 35-yard line, Rivers was intercepted by linebacker Von Miller on a screen pass attempt, and Miller returned the interception to the Chargers' 18-yard line. The Broncos capitalized three plays later, with running back Royce Freeman rushing for a three-yard touchdown.

After forcing a three-and-out from the Chargers, the Broncos took a 20–19 lead early in the fourth quarter, with Lindsay rushing for a 2-yard touchdown on a direct snap. Quarterback Case Keenum's two-point attempt was unsuccessful, as he was stopped just short of the goal line. The Chargers then drove to the Broncos' 12-yard line in eight plays, and a 30-yard field goal by Badgley gave the Chargers a 22–20 lead with 6:51 remaining in the game. The Broncos were attempting a rally, and reached the Chargers' 45-yard line with four minutes remaining in the game, but were forced to punt. The possession was extended by a fumble from wide receiver Emmanuel Sanders that was reversed by instant replay and ruled as an incomplete pass, as well as a Keenum interception that was nullified by a defensive holding penalty on Chargers' safety Jahleel Addae. The Chargers got the football back, and attempted to run out the clock after gaining one first down and forcing the Broncos to burn all of their timeouts, but were forced to punt just after the two-minute warning. With 1:51 remaining in the game and the Broncos backed up to their own 8-yard line, Keenum engineered a 7-play, 76-yard drive, culminating in placekicker Brandon McManus kicking a game-winning 34-yard field goal as time expired. The Chargers unsuccessfully tried to ice McManus, calling a timeout prior to McManus' first attempt.

==== Week 12: vs. Pittsburgh Steelers ====
Week Twelve: Pittsburgh Steelers at Denver Broncos – Game summary

Quarter	1	2	3	4	Total
Steelers	0	10	7	0	**17**
**Broncos**	3	7	7	7	**24**

at Broncos Stadium at Mile High, Denver, Colorado

- Date: November 25
- Game time: 2:25 pm. MST
- Game weather: 41 °F (5 °C), mostly sunny
- Game attendance: 76,536
- Referee: Tony Corrente
- TV announcers (CBS): Jim Nantz, Tony Romo, Tracy Wolfson, and Gene Steratore
- Recap, Gamebook

Game information

**First quarter**

- DEN – Brandon McManus 41-yard field goal, 6:26. Broncos 3–0. **Drive: 8 plays, 39 yards, 3:10.**

**Second quarter**

- PIT – Chris Boswell 41-yard field goal, 6:29. Tied 3–3. **Drive: 9 plays, 56 yards, 5:20.**
- DEN – Matt LaCosse 10-yard pass from Case Keenum (Brandon McManus kick), 3:27. Broncos 10–3. **Drive: 6 plays, 75 yards, 3:02.**
- PIT – Alejandro Villanueva 2-yard pass from Chris Boswell (Chris Boswell kick), 0:00. Tied 10–10. **Drive: 12 plays, 75 yards, 3:27.**

**Third quarter**

- PIT – JuJu Smith-Schuster 97-yard pass from Ben Roethlisberger (Chris Boswell kick), 10:32. Steelers 17–10. **Drive: 1 play, 97 yards, 0:15.**
- DEN – Emmanuel Sanders 5-yard pass from Case Keenum (Brandon McManus kick), 5:30. Tied 17–17. **Drive: 2 plays, 43 yards, 0:37.**

**Fourth quarter**

- DEN – Phillip Lindsay 2-yard run (Brandon McManus kick), 9:17. Broncos 24–17. **Drive: 11 plays, 79 yards, 5:43.**

**Top passers**

- PIT – Ben Roethlisberger – 41/56, 462 yards, TD, 2 INT
- DEN – Case Keenum – 15/28, 197 yards, 2 TD

**Top rushers**

- PIT – James Conner – 13 rushes, 53 yards
- DEN – Phillip Lindsay – 14 rushes, 110 yards, TD

**Top receivers**

- PIT – JuJu Smith-Schuster – 13 rushes, 189 yards, TD
- DEN – Emmanuel Sanders – 7 rushes, 86 yards, TD

The Broncos donned their orange color rush uniforms in the Week 12 matchup against the Pittsburgh Steelers, who were victimized by several missed scoring opportunities. On the Steelers' first possession, placekicker Chris Boswell's 48-yard field goal attempt was blocked by Justin Simmons. The Broncos took the early lead, with a 41-yard field goal by placekicker Brandon McManus – the only scoring play of the first quarter. The Steelers then drove down the field, attempting to take their first lead, with quarterback Ben Roethlisberger completing a pass to tight end Xavier Grimble along the sidelines. However, Broncos' safety Will Parks forced a fumble just before Grimble reached the goal line, with the football going out of the end zone for a touchback. Following a Broncos' punt, Boswell atoned for his earlier blocked field goal attempt, with a 41-yard field goal. The first touchdown of the game came courtesy of a 10-yard touchdown pass from Broncos' quarterback Case Keenum to tight end Matt LaCosse at the 3:33 mark of the second quarter. The Steelers then marched down the field, and were attempting a 19-yard field goal attempt to close out the first half, however, the Steelers' special teams caught the Broncos off-guard, with a 2-yard touchdown from Boswell to Alejandro Villanueva on a fake field goal pass to tie the game at 10–10.

Following an exchange of punts to begin the second half, the Steelers grabbed their first (and only) lead of the game, with Roethlisberger launching a 97-yard touchdown pass to wide receiver JuJu Smith-Schuster. Following a three-and-out from the Broncos, the Steelers were attempting to add to their lead, however, Roethlisberger was intercepted by cornerback Chris Harris, Jr. The Broncos capitalized two plays later, with Keenum connecting with wide receiver Emmanuel Sanders on a 5-yard touchdown to tie the game at 17–17. Following another exchange of punts, the Steelers reached the Broncos' 23-yard line, however, Broncos' cornerback Bradley Roby forced a fumble off Steelers' running back James Conner near the end of the third quarter. The Broncos once again capitalized, with an 11-play, 79-yard drive, culminating in a 2-yard touchdown run by running back Phillip Lindsay. This gave the Broncos a 24–17 lead at the 9:22 mark of the fourth quarter. Both teams punted on their next possession, and the Steelers, with only one timeout, had one last offensive possession with 4:26 remaining in the game. Just before the two-minute warning, the Steelers reached the Broncos' 3-yard line, with a first-and-goal. However, on the third play after the two-minute warning, Roethlisberger's short pass intended for wide receiver Antonio Brown was intercepted by linebacker Shelby Harris for a touchback – the Steelers' fourth turnover of the game – to seal the win for the Broncos.

==== Week 13: at Cincinnati Bengals ====
Week Thirteen: Denver Broncos at Cincinnati Bengals – Game summary

Quarter	1	2	3	4	Total
**Broncos**	0	7	14	3	**24**
Bengals	0	3	7	0	**10**

at Paul Brown Stadium, Cincinnati, Ohio

- Date: December 2
- Game time: 1:00 pm. EST/11:00 am. MST
- Game weather: 63 °F (17 °C), sunny
- Game attendance: 44,392
- Referee: Ronald Torbert
- TV announcers (CBS): Spero Dedes and Adam Archuleta
- Recap, Gamebook

Game information

**First quarter**

- No scoring plays.

**Second quarter**

- DEN – Phillip Lindsay 6-yard run (Brandon McManus kick), 1:56. Broncos 7–0. **Drive: 8 plays, 55 yards, 3:01.**
- CIN – Randy Bullock 35-yard field goal, 0:12. Broncos 7–3. **Drive: 12 plays, 58 yards, 1:44.**

**Third quarter**

- DEN – Courtland Sutton 30-yard pass from Case Keenum (Brandon McManus kick), 11:27. Broncos 14–3. **Drive: 2 plays, 33 yards, 0:40.**
- DEN – Phillip Lindsay 65-yard run (Brandon McManus kick), 7:35. Broncos 21–3. **Drive: 4 plays, 85 yards, 2:01.**
- CIN – Cody Core 30-yard pass from Jeff Driskel (Randy Bullock kick), 2:45. Broncos 21–10. **Drive: 8 plays, 75 yards, 4:50.**

**Fourth quarter**

- DEN – Brandon McManus 29-yard field goal, 0:23. Broncos 24–10. **Drive: 4 plays, 7 yards, 2:16.**

**Top passers**

- DEN – Case Keenum – 12/21, 151 yards, TD
- CIN – Jeff Driskel – 25/38, 236 yards, TD, INT

**Top rushers**

- DEN – Phillip Lindsay – 19 rushes, 157 yards, 2 TD
- CIN – Joe Mixon – 12 rushes, 82 yards

**Top receivers**

- DEN – Courtland Sutton – 4 receptions, 85 yards, TD
- CIN – Tyler Boyd – 6 receptions, 97 yards

Neither team advanced past their opponent's 43-yard line through their first three possessions, until the Broncos' fourth possession, in which placekicker Brandon McManus missed wide left on a 50-yard field goal attempt. The first points of the game came courtesy of a 6-yard touchdown run by Broncos' running back Phillip Lindsay at the two-minute warning. The Bengals then drove down the field, however, the Broncos' defense limited the Bengals to a 35-yard field goal by placekicker Randy Bullock just before halftime. Following an exchange of punts to begin the second half, the Broncos increased their lead, with quarterback Case Keenum connecting with wide receiver Courtland Sutton on a 30-yard touchdown pass. The Bengals reached the Broncos' 30-yard line on their second possession of the second half, however quarterback Jeff Driskel, playing in place of the injured Andy Dalton, was intercepted by cornerback Justin Simmons at the 7-yard line. The Broncos capitalized four plays later, with Lindsay rushing for a 65-yard touchdown. The Bengals responded, with Driskel throwing a 30-yard touchdown pass to wide receiver Cody Core to narrow the Broncos' lead to 21–10. Despite a lost fumble by Broncos' running back Royce Freeman near midfield toward the end of the third quarter, the Bengals' offense did not advance past the Broncos' 47-yard line for the remainder of the game. With 2:49 remaining in the game, linebacker Bradley Chubb forced a fumble off Driskel, and with the Bengals out of timeouts, a 29-yard field goal by McManus with only 27 seconds left put the game out of reach.

==== Week 14: at San Francisco 49ers ====
Week Fourteen: Denver Broncos at San Francisco 49ers – Game summary

Quarter	1	2	3	4	Total
Broncos	0	0	7	7	**14**
**49ers**	3	17	0	0	**20**

at Levi's Stadium, Santa Clara, California

- Date: December 9
- Game time: 2:05 pm. MST/1:05 pm. PST
- Game weather: 54 °F (12 °C), overcast
- Game attendance: 69,449
- Referee: Shawn Smith
- TV announcers (CBS): Andrew Catalon and James Lofton
- Recap, Gamebook

Game information

**First quarter**

- SF – Robbie Gould 40-yard field goal, 10:23. 49ers 3–0. **Drive: 9 plays, 56 yards, 4:37.**

**Second quarter**

- SF – Robbie Gould 29-yard field goal, 13:01. 49ers 6–0. **Drive: 7 plays, 69 yards, 4:09.**
- SF – George Kittle 85-yard pass from Nick Mullens (Robbie Gould kick), 9:47. 49ers 13–0. **Drive: 1 play, 85 yards, 0:13.**
- SF – Dante Pettis 1-yard pass from Nick Mullens (Robbie Gould kick), 0:08. 49ers 20–0. **Drive: 7 plays, 72 yards, 0:59.**

**Third quarter**

- DEN – Phillip Lindsay 3-yard run (Brandon McManus kick), 6:05. 49ers 20–7. **Drive: 11 plays, 56 yards, 4:54.**

**Fourth quarter**

- DEN – DaeSean Hamilton 1-yard pass from Case Keenum (Brandon McManus kick), 3:53. 49ers 20–14. **Drive: 14 plays, 69 yards, 3:02.**

**Top passers**

- DEN – Case Keenum – 24/42, 186 yards, TD
- SF – Nick Mullens – 20/33, 332 yards, 2 TD, INT

**Top rushers**

- DEN – Royce Freeman – 6 rushes, 36 yards
- SF – Jeff Wilson – 23 rushes, 90 yards

**Top receivers**

- DEN – Tim Patrick – 7 receptions, 85 yards
- SF – George Kittle – 7 receptions, 210 yards, TD

The Broncos fell behind 20–0 at halftime, and the defense allowed 210 receiving yards to 49ers' tight end George Kittle – 85 of which came on one play, which resulted in a 49ers' touchdown. Placekicker Robbie Gould added two field goals – a 40-yarder in the first quarter followed by a 29-yarder in the second quarter, and quarterback Nick Mullens also threw a 1-yard touchdown pass to wide receiver Dante Pettis. The Broncos' offense accumulated only 70 total yards on their first six possessions (excluding a kneel down before halftime), went 2-for-15 on third down conversions and running back Phillip Lindsay, who rushed for 157 yards against the Bengals during the previous week, was held to just 30 yards rushing. The Broncos finally got on the scoreboard at the six-minute mark of the third quarter, with a 3-yard rushing touchdown by Lindsay. The Broncos' offense failed on two 4th-down conversions on their next two possessions, and with only 3:57 remaining in the game, a 1-yard touchdown pass from quarterback Case Keenum to wide receiver DaeSean Hamilton pulled the Broncos to within a 20–14 deficit. However, the Broncos' defense was unable to prevent Mullens from converting two crucial third-down pass completions prior to the two-minute warning, forcing the Broncos to burn two timeouts – the other timeout was lost another on an unsuccessful challenge, and leaving the Broncos with only eight seconds for one last desperation pass play, which was snuffed out by the 49ers' defense.

==== Week 15: vs. Cleveland Browns ====
Week Fifteen: Cleveland Browns at Denver Broncos – Game summary

Quarter	1	2	3	4	Total
**Browns**	7	3	0	7	**17**
Broncos	7	3	3	3	**16**

at Broncos Stadium at Mile High, Denver, Colorado

- Date: December 15
- Game time: 6:20 pm. MST
- Game weather: 46 °F (8 °C), partly cloudy
- Game attendance: 76,596
- Referee: Clay Martin
- TV announcers (NFLN/KDVR): Mike Tirico, Kurt Warner, and Peter Schrager
- Recap, Gamebook

Game information

**First quarter**

- CLE – Breshad Perriman 31-yard pass from Baker Mayfield (Greg Joseph kick), 11:49. Browns 7–0. **Drive: 4 plays, 51 yards, 1:23.**
- DEN – Case Keenum 1-yard run (Brandon McManus kick), 3:18. Tied 7–7. **Drive: 13 plays, 88 yards, 6:37.**

**Second quarter**

- DEN – Brandon McManus 44-yard field goal, 8:16. Broncos 10–7. **Drive: 12 plays, 61 yards, 6:44.**
- CLE – Greg Joseph 40-yard field goal, 4:53. Tied 10-10. **Drive: 9 plays, 53 yards, 3:23.**

**Third quarter**

- DEN – Brandon McManus 42-yard field goal, 1:41. Broncos 13–10. **Drive: 8 plays, 36 yards, 4:08.**

**Fourth quarter**

- CLE – Antonio Callaway 2-yard pass from Baker Mayfield (Greg Joseph kick), 11:44. Browns 17–13. **Drive: 6 plays, 48 yards, 2:57.**
- DEN – Brandon McManus 29-yard field goal, 4:35. Browns 17–16. **Drive: 13 plays, 64 yards, 7:09.**

**Top passers**

- CLE – Baker Mayfield – 18/31, 188 yards, 2 TD, 1 INT
- DEN – Case Keenum – 31/48, 257 yards, 2 INT

**Top rushers**

- CLE – Nick Chubb – 20 rushes, 100 yards
- DEN – Phillip Lindsay – 14 rushes, 24 yards

**Top receivers**

- CLE – Jarvis Landry – 3 receptions, 37 yards
- DEN – Tim Patrick – 5 receptions, 65 yards

The Cleveland Browns took the early lead, with quarterback Baker Mayfield launching a 31-yard touchdown pass to wide receiver Breshad Perriman. After going three-and-out on their first two possessions, the Broncos got on the scoreboard later in the first quarter, with quarterback Case Keenum rushing for a 1-yard touchdown, then grabbed the lead midway through the second quarter, with a 44-yard field goal by placekicker Brandon McManus. Cleveland responded on their next possession, with a 40-yard field goal by placekicker Greg Joseph. The Broncos were attempting to re-take the lead on their next possession, reaching the Cleveland 29-yard line, however Keenum was intercepted by Cleveland safety Jabrill Peppers in the end zone for a touchback. The Broncos' defense subsequently returned the favor, as Cleveland reached the Broncos' 30-yard line just before halftime, however, Mayfield was intercepted by safety Dymonte Thomas near the goal line. After forcing a fumble off Mayfield, a 42-yard field goal by McManus gave the Broncos a 13–10 lead late in the third quarter.

After forcing a Cleveland punt, Keenum was intercepted by cornerback T. J. Carrie at the Broncos' 48-yard line on the second play of the fourth quarter. Six plays later, Cleveland capitalized and took a 17–13 lead, with a 2-yard touchdown pass from Mayfield to wide receiver Antonio Callaway. With 11:49 left in the game, the Broncos drove 64 yards in 13 plays, and instead of trying to convert a 4th-and-1 at the Cleveland 6-yard line, they elected for a 29-yard field goal by McManus to pull within a 17–16 deficit with 4:39 left. Cleveland drove down to the Broncos' 10-yard line and forced the Broncos to use the last two of their three team timeouts. However, instead of trying to increase their lead with a field goal, Cleveland attempted to run out the clock, but running back Nick Chubb was stopped for a 2-yard loss on a 4th-and-1 at the Broncos' 12-yard line. The Broncos reached midfield with 1:12 remaining in the game, however, after Keenum spiked the football on first down and two incomplete passes, Keenum was sacked by Peppers to end the Broncos' rally attempt.

Notes

This was the Cleveland Browns' first victory over the Broncos since 1990, snapping an 11-game losing streak to the Broncos. The Broncos own a 23–6 all-time record vs. Cleveland (including the playoffs). The Broncos wore their alternate navy blue jerseys for this game. This game featured Broncos' linebacker Bradley Chubb playing against his cousin, Cleveland running back Nick Chubb. With the loss, coupled with the Tennessee Titans' victory over the New York Giants the following day, the Broncos were officially eliminated from postseason contention.

==== Week 16: at Oakland Raiders ====
Week Sixteen: Denver Broncos at Oakland Raiders – Game summary

Quarter	1	2	3	4	Total
Broncos	0	0	7	7	**14**
**Raiders**	7	10	0	10	**27**

at Oakland–Alameda County Coliseum, Oakland, California

- Date: December 24
- Game time: 6:15 pm. MST/5:15 pm. PST
- Game weather: 58 °F (14 °C), rain
- Game attendance: 53,850
- Referee: Carl Cheffers
- TV announcers (ESPN): Joe Tessitore, Jason Witten, Booger McFarland, and Lisa Salters
- Recap, Gamebook

Game information

**First quarter**

- OAK – Dwayne Harris 99-yard punt return (Daniel Carlson kick), 10:10. Raiders 7–0.

**Second quarter**

- OAK – Doug Martin 24-yard run (Daniel Carlson kick), 7:56. Raiders 14–0. **Drive: 9 plays, 89 yards, 5:35.**
- OAK – Daniel Carlson 43-yard field goal, 0:19. Raiders 17–0. **Drive: 11 plays, 55 yards, 4:02.**

**Third quarter**

- DEN – DaeSean Hamilton 7-yard pass from Case Keenum (Brandon McManus kick), 4:36. Raiders 17–7. **Drive: 10 plays, 82 yards, 3:34.**

**Fourth quarter**

- OAK – Jalen Richard 3-yard run (Daniel Carlson kick), 12:16. Raiders 24–7. **Drive: 12 plays, 72 yards, 7:20.**
- DEN – Courtland Sutton 19-yard pass from Case Keenum (Brandon McManus kick), 7:31. Raiders 24–14. **Drive: 11 plays, 77 yards, 4:45.**
- OAK – Daniel Carlson 45-yard field goal, 4:38. Raiders 27–14. **Drive: 4 plays, 4 yards, 0:58.**

**Top passers**

- DEN – Case Keenum – 23/37, 202 yards, 2 TD, 2 INT
- OAK – Derek Carr – 19/26, 167 yards

**Top rushers**

- DEN – Phillip Lindsay – 10 rushes, 46 yards
- OAK – Doug Martin – 21 rushes, 107 yards, TD

**Top receivers**

- DEN – Courtland Sutton – 6 receptions, 65 yards, TD
- OAK – Jordy Nelson – 7 receptions, 75 yards

The Broncos fell behind 17–0 by halftime to the Raiders – the second time in three weeks in which they were shutout in the first half. On their first possession, the Broncos punted, and cornerback Isaac Yiadom failed to down the punt neat the goal line. Raiders' return specialist Dwayne Harris took advantage of Yiadom's blunder by returning the football 99 yards for a touchdown. The Raiders later increased their lead to 17–0 in the second quarter, with a 24-yard touchdown run by running back Doug Martin and a 43-yard field goal by placekicker Daniel Carlson. The Broncos' offense failed to advance past the Raiders' 45-yard line on their first five drives, and on their sixth drive, placekicker Brandon McManus missed short on a 58-yard field goal attempt just before halftime. The Broncos finally got on the scoreboard at the 4:40 mark of the third quarter, with a 7-yard touchdown pass from quarterback Case Keenum to wide receiver DaeSean Hamilton, which was the only scoring play of the third quarter. The Raiders responded, with a 12-play, 72-yard drive that consumed 7:20, culminating in a 3-yard touchdown run by running back Jalen Richard early in the fourth quarter. The Broncos once again pulled to within a 10–point deficit, with Keenum throwing his second touchdown of the second half – a 19-yarder to wide receiver Courtland Sutton. The touchdown was disputed by the Raiders' bench – thinking that Keenum had crossed the line of scrimmage prior to the pass. After forcing a three-and-out, the Broncos were attempting a rally, however, Keenum was intercepted by safety Marcus Gilchrist, and a 45-yard field goal by Carlson increased the Raiders' lead to 27–14 with 4:42 remaining in the game. Without any timeouts, the Broncos had one last possession, however, Keenum was intercepted again – this time by safety Erik Harris, which ended the Broncos' rally attempt. With the loss, the Broncos clinched back-to-back losing seasons for the first time since 1971–1972.

==== Week 17: vs. Los Angeles Chargers ====
Week Seventeen: Los Angeles Chargers at Denver Broncos – Game summary

Quarter	1	2	3	4	Total
**Chargers**	0	7	7	9	**23**
Broncos	0	3	0	6	**9**

at Broncos Stadium at Mile High, Denver, Colorado

- Date: December 30
- Game time: 2:25 pm. MST
- Game weather: 51 °F (11 °C), mostly cloudy
- Game attendance: 75,947
- Referee: John Parry
- TV announcers (CBS): Spero Dedes and Adam Archuleta
- Recap, Gamebook

Game information

**First quarter**

- No scoring plays

**Second quarter**

- LAC – Kyle Emanuel 18-yard fumble return (Michael Badgley kick), 5:32. Chargers 7–0.
- DEN – Brandon McManus 28-yard field goal, 0:11. Chargers 7–3. **Drive: 7 plays, 10 yards, 1:01.**

**Third quarter**

- LAC – Mike Williams 3-yard pass from Philip Rivers (Michael Badgley kick), 3:46. Chargers 14–3. **Drive: 4 plays, 16 yards, 2:07.**

**Fourth quarter**

- DEN – Andy Janovich 20-yard pass from Case Keenum, 10:10. Chargers 14–9. **Drive: 5 plays, 56 yards, 2:10.**
- LAC – Casey Hayward defensive two-point conversion. Chargers 16–9.
- LAC – Austin Ekeler 1-yard run (Michael Badgley kick), 5:48. Chargers 23–9. **Drive: 7 plays, 75 yards, 4:22.**

**Top passers**

- LAC – Philip Rivers – 14/24, 176 yards, TD, 2 INT
- DEN – Case Keenum – 31/48, 292 yards, TD, INT

**Top rushers**

- LAC – Austin Ekeler – 8 rushes, 58 yards, TD
- DEN – Royce Freeman – 17 rushes, 60 yards

**Top receivers**

- LAC – Mike Williams – 5 receptions, 65 yards, TD
- DEN – DaeSean Hamilton – 5 receptions, 49 yards

The Broncos hosted the Los Angeles Chargers in the 2018 regular season finale. Chargers' quarterback Philip Rivers was intercepted twice by the Broncos' defense in the first quarter, however, the Broncos failed to capitalize both times. After a scoreless first quarter, Chargers' linebacker Kyle Emanuel recovered a fumble off a lateral pass and fumble by Broncos' quarterback Case Keenum for an 18-yard touchdown. The Broncos reached the red zone just before halftime, but were forced to settle on a 28-yard field goal by placekicker Brandon McManus. The Broncos got a reprieve after Keenum was intercepted by safety Jahleel Addae in the end zone, who lost the fumble on the runback and was recovered by offensive tackle Elijah Wilkinson. The Chargers increased their lead late in the third quarter, with a 3-yard touchdown pass from Rivers to wide receiver Mike Williams. The Broncos pulled to within a 14–9 deficit early in the fourth quarter, with Keenum connecting on a 20-yard touchdown pass to fullback Andy Janovich. The Broncos attempted a two-point conversion, hoping to pull to within a three-point deficit, however, Keenum was intercepted by linebacker Casey Hayward three yards deep in the end zone, who ran down the field 103 yards for a defensive two-point conversion. The Chargers responded and increased their lead to 23–9, with a 1-yard touchdown run by running back Austin Ekeler with six minutes remaining in the game. The Broncos had one last offensive possession and reached the Chargers' 31-yard line, but turned the football over on downs just before the two-minute warning.

Notes

One day after the game (December 31), Vance Joseph was fired after posting an 11–21 record in his two seasons as the Broncos' head coach.

=== Standings ===
==== Division ====
AFC West
	W	L	T	PCT	DIV	CONF	PF	PA	STK
^{(1)} Kansas City Chiefs	12	4	0	.750	5–1	10–2	565	421	W1
^{(5)} Los Angeles Chargers	12	4	0	.750	4–2	9–3	428	329	W1
Denver Broncos	6	10	0	.375	2–4	4–8	329	349	L4
Oakland Raiders	4	12	0	.250	1–5	3–9	290	467	L1

==== Conference ====
AFC
#	Team	Division	W	L	T	PCT	DIV	CONF	SOS	SOV	STK
**Division leaders**
1 (Note: Kansas City finished ahead of LA Chargers in the AFC West based on division record, claiming the No. 1 seed.)	Kansas City Chiefs	West	12	4	0	.750	5–1	10–2	.480	.401	W1
2 (Note: New England claimed the No. 2 seed over Houston based on head-to-head victory.)	New England Patriots	East	11	5	0	.688	5–1	8–4	.482	.494	W2
3	Houston Texans	South	11	5	0	.688	4–2	9–3	.471	.435	W1
4	Baltimore Ravens	North	10	6	0	.625	3–3	8–4	.496	.450	W3
**Wild Cards**
5	Los Angeles Chargers	West	12	4	0	.750	4–2	9–3	.477	.422	W1
6	Indianapolis Colts	South	10	6	0	.625	4–2	7–5	.465	.456	W4
**Did not qualify for the postseason**
7	Pittsburgh Steelers	North	9	6	1	.594	4–1–1	6–5–1	.504	.448	W1
8	Tennessee Titans	South	9	7	0	.563	3–3	5–7	.520	.465	L1
9	Cleveland Browns	North	7	8	1	.469	3–2–1	5–6–1	.516	.411	L1
10	Miami Dolphins	East	7	9	0	.438	4–2	6–6	.469	.446	L3
11 (Note: Denver finished ahead of Cincinnati and Buffalo based on strength of victory. Cincinnati finished ahead of Buffalo based on record vs. common opponents. Cincinnati's cumulative record against Baltimore, Indianapolis, the Los Angeles Chargers and Miami was 3–2, compared to Buffalo's 1–4 cumulative record against the same four teams.)	Denver Broncos	West	6	10	0	.375	2–4	4–8	.523	.464	L4
12	Cincinnati Bengals	North	6	10	0	.375	1–5	4–8	.535	.448	L2
13	Buffalo Bills	East	6	10	0	.375	2–4	4–8	.523	.411	W1
14	Jacksonville Jaguars	South	5	11	0	.313	1–5	4–8	.549	.463	L1
15 (Note: NY Jets finished ahead of Oakland based on strength of victory.)	New York Jets	East	4	12	0	.250	1–5	3–9	.506	.438	L3
16	Oakland Raiders	West	4	12	0	.250	1–5	3–9	.547	.406	L1
**Tiebreakers** (Note: When breaking ties for three or more teams under the NFL's rules, they are first broken within divisions, then comparing only the highest ranked remaining team from each division.)

=== Statistics ===
==== Team leaders ====
Category	Player(s)	Value
Passing yards	Case Keenum	3,890
Passing touchdowns	Case Keenum	18
Rushing yards	Phillip Lindsay	1,037
Rushing touchdowns	Phillip Lindsay	9
Receptions	Emmanuel Sanders	71
Receiving yards	Emmanuel Sanders	868
Receiving touchdowns	Emmanuel Sanders; Courtland Sutton	4
Points	Brandon McManus	95
Kickoff return yards	Devontae Booker	234
Punt return yards	River Cracraft	40
Tackles	Todd Davis	114
Sacks	Von Miller	14.5
Forced fumbles	Von Miller	4
Interceptions	Chris Harris, Jr. Justin Simmons	3

Source for this section: Denver Broncos' official website.

==== League rankings ====
Offense
Category	Value	NFL rank (out of 32)
Total yards	350.1 YPG	19th
Yards per play	5.5	18th
Rushing yards	119.2 YPG	12th
Yards per rush	4.9	3rd
Passing yards	230.9 YPG	19th
Yards per pass	6.7	25th
Total touchdowns	39	T–20th
Rushing touchdowns	18	T–4th
Receiving touchdowns	19	T–24th
Scoring	20.6 PPG	24th
Pass completions	367/588 (.624)	22nd
Third downs	69/207 (.333)	28th
First downs per game	20	20th
Possession average	28:58	28th
Fewest sacks allowed	34	T–10th
Turnover differential	+7	T–8th
Fewest penalties	125	31st
Fewest penalty yardage	985	27th

Defense
Category	Value	NFL rank (out of 32)
Total yards	365.1 YPG	22nd
Yards per play	5.7	19th
Rushing yards	4.5 YPG	17th
Yards per rush	4.5	19th
Passing yards	245.6 YPG	20th
Yards per pass	7.7	24th
Total touchdowns	39	T–12th
Rushing touchdowns	11	T–6th
Receiving touchdowns	26	T–14th
Scoring	21.8 PPG	13th
Pass completions	353/549 (.643)	16th
Third downs	82/211 (.389)	17th
First downs per game	19.9	16th
Sacks	44	T–8th
Forced fumbles	13	T–12th
Fumble recoveries	10	T–11th
Interceptions	17	T–5th
Fewest penalties	123	29th
Fewest penalty yardage	1,006	26th

Special Teams
Category	Value	NFL rank (out of 32)
Kickoff returns	20.1 YPR	28th
Punt returns	4.4 YPR	32nd
Gross punting	44.5 YPP	19th
Net punting	38.3 YPP	28th
Kickoff coverage	20.8 YPR	4th
Punt coverage	10.5 YPR	29th

Source for this section: NFL.com.

== Records and milestones ==
- Week 2: Running back Phillip Lindsay, a Denver native, became the first undrafted free agent in NFL history to achieve 100-plus scrimmage yards in his first two games.
- Week 7: Wide receiver Demaryius Thomas reached 9,000 career receiving yards.
- Week 11: Linebacker Von Miller reached 100 career sacks and became the fifth-fastest to do so since 1982. Miller also reached 10 sacks on the season, becoming only the third defensive lineman in NFL history to achieve double-digit sack seasons within their first eight years, joining Reggie White and DeMarcus Ware.
- Week 14: Linebacker Bradley Chubb reached 12.5 sacks, setting a new franchise record for sacks by a rookie, surpassing the previous record of 11.5 sacks that was set by Rulon Jones (1980) and Von Miller (2011).
- Week 15: Von Miller became the Broncos' all-time leader in sacks, surpassing Simon Fletcher.
- Week 16: Phillip Lindsay become only the third undrafted rookie to rush for 1,000 yards, following Dominic Rhodes in 2001 and LeGarrette Blount in 2010. Lindsay also become the first Broncos' rookie to rush for 1,000 yards since Clinton Portis in 2002.

== Awards and honors ==
Recipient	awards
Bradley Chubb	October: NFL Defensive Rookie of the Month
Phillip Lindsay	Week 13: AFC Offensive Player, FedEx Ground Player and NFL Rookie of the Week; Colorado Sports Hall of Fame Athlete of the year 2018 season: Named to the Pro Football Writers of America's All-NFL and All-AFC team
Von Miller	Week 11: AFC Defensive Player of the Week; 2018 season: Named to the Pro Football Writers of America's All-NFL and All-AFC team
Emmanuel Sanders	Week 7: AFC Offensive Player of the Week

=== Pro Bowl and All-Pro selections ===
Linebacker Von Miller and running back Phillip Lindsay were selected to the 2019 Pro Bowl, while linebacker Bradley Chubb, cornerback Chris Harris, Jr. and wide receiver Emmanuel Sanders were named as alternates. Miller was also voted to the 2018 All-Pro Team and named to the Second Team. Lindsay became the first undrafted rookie in NFL history to earn a Pro Bowl selection, however, due to a wrist injury that he suffered during the Broncos' second-to-last game of the season, Lindsay did not play in the Pro Bowl, and served as an NFL social media correspondent instead. Sanders did not participate due to a ruptured Achilles tendon that ended his season on December 5.

On January 16, 2019, Casey Kreiter was selected as the first long snapper to ever be selected to a Pro Bowl. Five days later, Harris was selected to the Pro Bowl roster as a replacement for New England Patriots' cornerback Stephon Gilmore. Harris was declared healthy after suffering a broken fibula that forced him to miss the Broncos' last four games of the season.

== Other news and notes ==
On June 20, the Broncos reached a temporary naming rights agreement for their home stadium. Colorado-based sporting goods retailer Sports Authority previously held the naming rights for the Broncos' stadium from 2011 to 2017, despite going bankrupt in 2016. Shortly after the end of the 2017 season, the Broncos removed the old signage from the exterior of their stadium – formerly known as "Sports Authority Field at Mile High," and previously known as "Invesco Field at Mile High" from 2001 to 2010. For the 2018 season, the official name, which was approved by the Metropolitan Football Stadium District board, was known as "Broncos Stadium at Mile High," until the team came to terms on a new naming rights deal just before the start of the 2019 season, renaming the Broncos' home field as Empower Field at Mile High.
