= Austin Schlottmann =

American football player (born 1995)

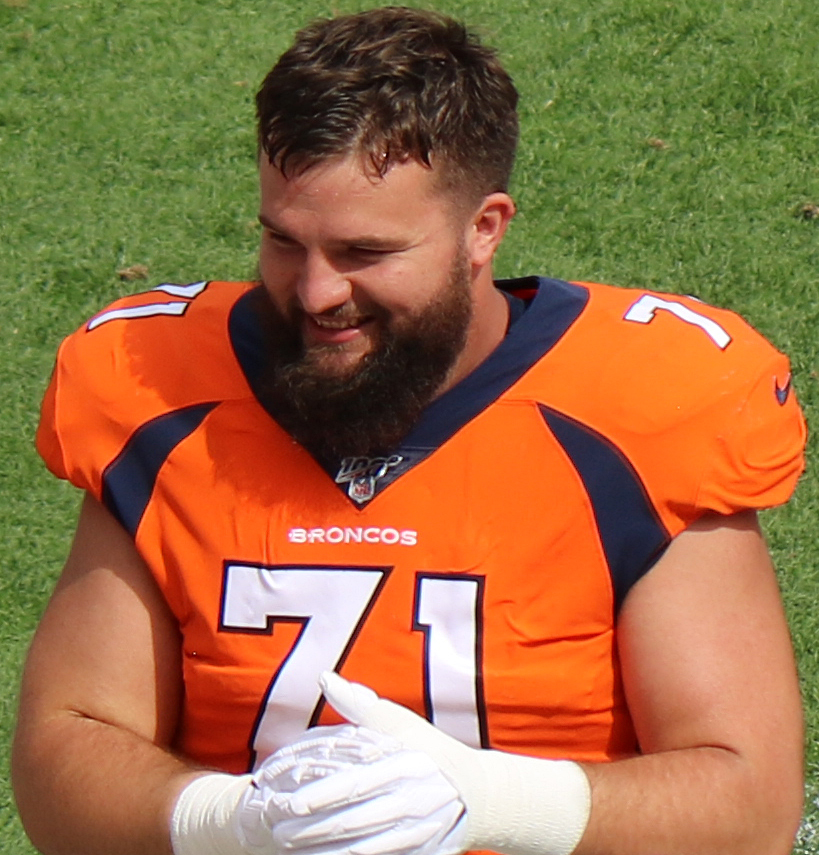
- Schlottmann with the Denver Broncos in 2019

No. 51 – Tennessee Titans
- Position: Center
- Roster status: Active

Personal information
- Born: September 18, 1995 (age 31); Brenham, Texas, U.S.
- Listed height: 6 ft 6 in (1.98 m)
- Listed weight: 310 lb (141 kg)

Career information
- High school: Brenham
- College: TCU (2014–2017)
- NFL draft: 2018: undrafted

Career history
- Denver Broncos (2018–2021); Minnesota Vikings (2022–2023); New York Giants (2024–2025); Tennessee Titans (2026–present)

Awards and highlights
- Second-team All-Big 12 (2016)

Career NFL statistics as of Week 4, 2026
- Games played: 89
- Games started: 22
- Stats at Pro Football Reference

Austin Schlottmann (born September 18, 1995) is an American professional football center for the Tennessee Titans of the National Football League (NFL). He played college football for the TCU Horned Frogs. Schlottmann signed as an undrafted free agent with the Denver Broncos after the 2018 NFL draft, and has also played in the NFL for the Minnesota Vikings and New York Giants.

== Early life ==
Schlottmann was born and raised in Brenham, Texas, where he became a football star at Brenham High School, earning All-State honors in 2013 while helping lead the Cubs to the Class 4A Championship game at AT&T Stadium. A 3-star offensive tackle recruit, he signed a national letter of intent to play college football at TCU on February 5, 2014, over offers from Arizona State, Houston, Louisiana Tech, New Mexico, Northern Colorado, Rice, Texas State, Tulsa, and UCF.

== College career ==
Schlottmann enrolled at TCU in the summer of 2014, and played in all 13 of the Frogs' games that fall as true freshman. That season, the team won a Big 12 Conference championship and ranked third in the final polls after blowing out Ole Miss 42–3 in the Peach Bowl.

Schlottman was named second-team All-Big 12 as a junior in 2016, and honorable mention All-Big 12 as a senior in 2017. Overall in his college career, he played in 51 games, starting 29 of them (19 at center and 10 at right guard).

== Professional career ==
Pre-draft measurables
| Height | Weight | Arm length | Hand span | Wingspan | 40-yard dash | 10-yard split | 20-yard split | 20-yard shuttle | Three-cone drill | Vertical jump | Broad jump | Bench press |
|---|---|---|---|---|---|---|---|---|---|---|---|---|
| 6 ft 5 1/4 in (1.96 m) | 296 lb (134 kg) | 32 1/4 in (0.82 m) | 10 in (0.25 m) | 6 ft 6 1/2 in (1.99 m) | 5.00 s | 1.71 s | 2.82 s | 4.76 s | 7.50 s | 30.0 in (0.76 m) | 9 ft 0 in (2.74 m) | 32 reps |
All values from Pro Day

=== Denver Broncos ===
After going undrafted in the 2018 NFL draft, Schlottmann signed as an undrafted free agent with the Denver Broncos, which reunited him with high school teammate Courtland Sutton. He spent the entire 2018 season on the Broncos' practice squad.

In the 2019 season, he made the active roster as second-string left guard coming out of training camp. Schlottman made his regular season debut on September 9, 2019, against the Oakland Raiders on Monday Night Football. He was named the starting right guard in Week 14 after starter Ronald Leary was out for the rest of the season; second-string right guard Elijah Wilkinson was moved to right tackle to fill in for starting RT Ja'Wuan James out with a knee injury.

On August 31, 2021, Schlottmann was waived by the Broncos and re-signed to the practice squad the next day. He was promoted to the active roster on November 9.

=== Minnesota Vikings ===
On March 16, 2022, Schlottmann signed with the Minnesota Vikings. He was placed on injured reserve with a left fibula fracture on January 3, 2023; Greg Mancz was signed to take Schlottman's place, but was released 11 days later.

Schlottmann re-signed with the Vikings on March 17, 2023.

=== New York Giants ===
On March 15, 2024, Schlottmann signed a two–year deal with the New York Giants. He was placed on injured reserve on August 27. He was activated on December 28.

=== Tennessee Titans ===
On March 12, 2026, Schlottmann signed a two-year, $7 million contract with the Tennessee Titans.
