= Isaac Yiadom =

American football player (born 1996)

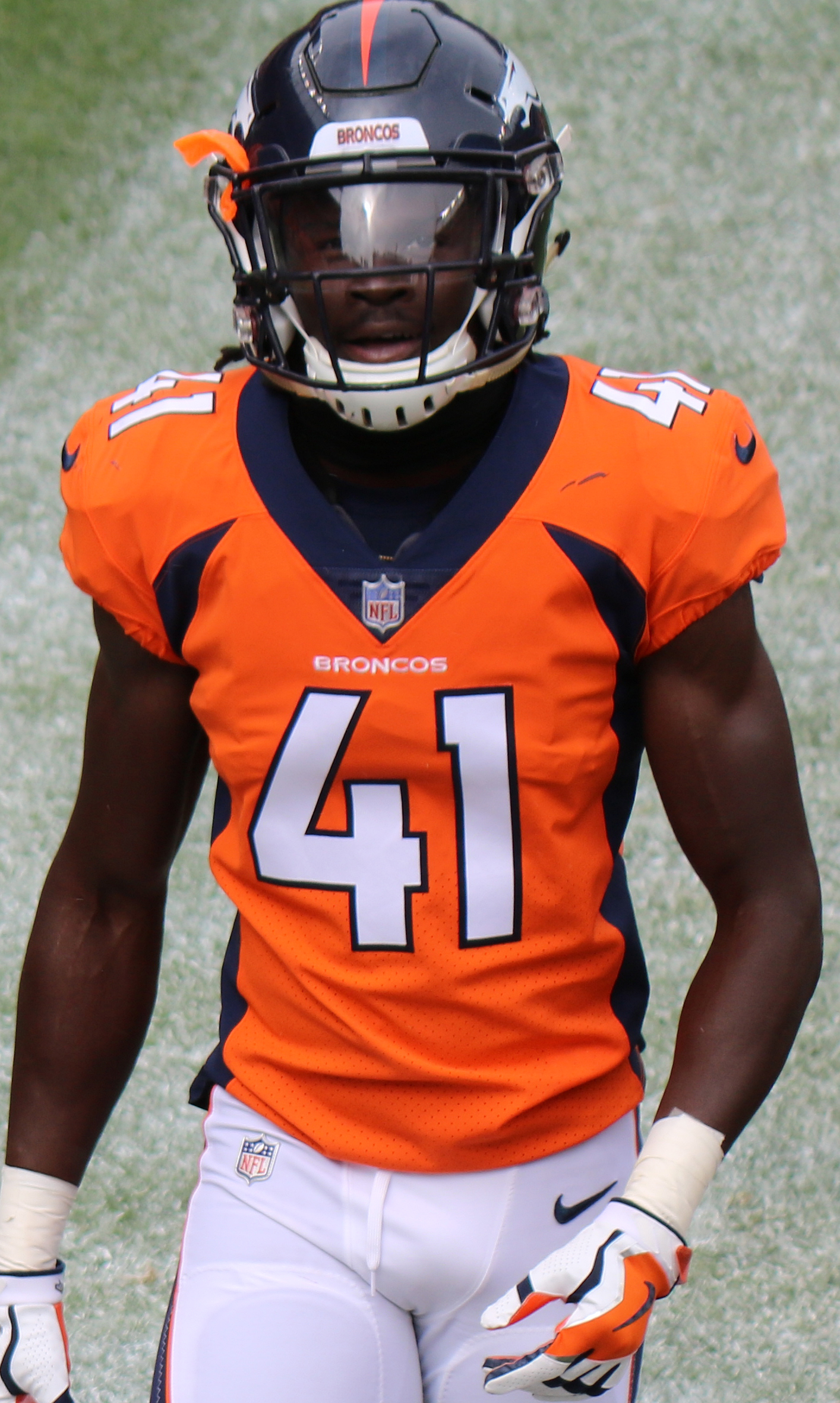
- Yiadom with the Denver Broncos in 2018

No. 37 – Washington Commanders
- Position: Cornerback
- Roster status: Active

Personal information
- Born: February 20, 1996 (age 30); Alexandria, Virginia, U.S.
- Listed height: 6 ft 1 in (1.85 m)
- Listed weight: 190 lb (86 kg)

Career information
- High school: Doherty Memorial (Worcester, Massachusetts)
- College: Boston College (2014–2017)
- NFL draft: 2018: 3rd round, 99th overall pick

Career history
- Denver Broncos (2018–2019); New York Giants (2020); Green Bay Packers (2021); Houston Texans (2022); New Orleans Saints (2022–2023); San Francisco 49ers (2024); New Orleans Saints (2025); Washington Commanders (2026–present)

Career NFL statistics as of Week 7, 2026
- Tackles: 230
- Sacks: 0.5
- Pass deflections: 32
- Interceptions: 3
- Forced fumbles: 3
- Fumble recoveries: 3
- Stats at Pro Football Reference

Isaac Yiadom (born February 20, 1996) is an American professional football cornerback for the Washington Commanders of the National Football League (NFL). Yiadom played college football for the Boston College Eagles. He was selected in the third round of the 2018 NFL draft by the Denver Broncos and has also played for the New York Giants, Green Bay Packers, Houston Texans, San Francisco 49ers, and New Orleans Saints.

== Early life and college career ==
Yiadom was born in Alexandria, Virginia. He and his family later moved to Worcester, Massachusetts, where he played football at Doherty Memorial High School, and helped lead the team to a Massachusetts 4A state championship as a senior, its first in over 30 years.

A 3-star cornerback recruit, Yiadom committed to play college football for Boston College over offers from Bryant, Holy Cross, UConn, UMass, and Virginia Tech. In four seasons at Boston College, Yiadom played in 48 games with 28 starts. He finished his college career with 110 tackles, three interceptions, one forced fumble, and 24 passes defended.

After a standout senior year in which he started all 13 games and recorded 53 tackles, two interceptions, and seven passes defended, Yiadom was invited to the 2018 Senior Bowl, alongside Boston College teammates Harold Landry and Kamrin Moore.

== Professional career ==
=== Pre-draft ===
On December 18, 2017, it was announced that Yiadom had accepted his invitation to play in the 2018 Senior Bowl. Prior to the Senior Bowl, Yiadom was ranked as the 47th best cornerback prospect in the by DraftScout.com and was unheralded due to his minimal targets in college. He impressed scouts and analysts with a strong week of practice for the Senior Bowl and immensely helped his draft stock. On January 27, 2018, Yiadom played in the 2018 Reese's Senior Bowl and was part of Denver Broncos' head coach Vance Joseph's South team that lost 45–16 to the North coach by Houston Texans' head coach Bill O'Brien. He attended the NFL Scouting Combine in Indianapolis and performed the majority of combine drills, but opted to skip the vertical jump and three-cone drill.

External videos
- Isaac Yiadom's NFL Combine Workout
- NFL Draft Tape: Isaac Yiadom

On March 21, 2018, Yiadom participated at Boston College's pro day and chose to perform the 40-yard dash (4.56s), 20-yard dash (2.63s), 10-yard dash (1.53s), vertical jump (34.5"), broad jump (10'0"), short shuttle (4.23s), and three-cone drill (6.85s). At the conclusion of the pre-draft process, Yiadom was projected to be a third or fourth-round pick by NFL draft experts and scouts. He was ranked the 12th best cornerback prospect in the draft by DraftScout.com and was ranked the 15th best cornerback by Scouts Inc.

Pre-draft measurables
Height	Weight	Arm length	Hand span	Wingspan	40-yard dash	10-yard split	20-yard split	20-yard shuttle	Three-cone drill	Vertical jump	Broad jump	Bench press
6 ft 0 7/8 in (1.85 m)	190 lb (86 kg)	32 1/4 in (0.82 m)	8 7/8 in (0.23 m)	6 ft 3 3/4 in (1.92 m)	4.52 s	1.59 s	2.65 s	4.18 s	6.85 s	34.5 in (0.88 m)	10 ft 0 in (3.05 m)	8 reps
All values from NFL Combine/Boston College's Pro Day

=== Denver Broncos ===
The Denver Broncos selected Yiadom in the third round (99th overall) of the 2018 NFL draft. Yiadom was the 11th cornerback drafted in 2018.

External videos
- Broncos draft Isaac Yiadom 99th overall

On May 25, 2018, the Broncos signed Yiadom to a four-year, $3.32 million contract that included a signing bonus of $761,516.

=== New York Giants ===
Yiadom was traded to the New York Giants for a 2021 seventh-round draft pick on September 3, 2020. Yiadom started 10 games for the Giants in his one season with them.

=== Green Bay Packers ===
Yiadom was traded to the Green Bay Packers for cornerback Josh Jackson on August 17, 2021. Yiadom started for the Packers on Week 6 against the Chicago Bears following injuries to starting cornerbacks Kevin King and Jaire Alexander. He committed a pass interference penalty on the opponent's opening drive to set up a Bears touchdown. Yiadom was subsequently benched for backup cornerback Rasul Douglas, who won the starting cornerback job with his steadier performance, and Yiadom being relegated to a backup and special teams role. On November 3, 2021, he was placed on reserve/COVID-19 list. He was activated off reserve/COVID-19 list on November 13, 2021. On January 21, 2022, he was released along with Jack Heflin to open roster spaces for the returns of Za'Darius Smith and Whitney Mercilus from injured reserve prior to the divisional playoff game.

=== Houston Texans ===
On March 24, 2022, Yiadom signed with the Houston Texans. He was released during final roster cuts on August 30. He was waived on November 15, 2022.

=== New Orleans Saints ===
On November 17, 2022, Yiadom was signed to the practice squad of the New Orleans Saints. He was promoted to the active roster on December 5.

Yiadom re-signed with the Saints on March 23, 2023.

=== San Francisco 49ers ===
On March 18, 2024, Yiadom signed a one–year contract with the San Francisco 49ers. Yiadom appeared in all 17 games for San Francisco in 2024, including 5 starts, and registered 1 interception, 6 pass deflections, 2 forced fumbles, 2 fumble recoveries, and 46 combined tackles.

=== New Orleans Saints (second stint) ===
On March 13, 2025, Yiadom signed a three-year, $9 million contract with the New Orleans Saints.

On August 30, 2026, Yiadom was released by the Saints.

=== Washington Commmanders ===
On September 1, 2026, the Washington Commanders signed Yiadom to their practice squad. He was promoted to the active roster on September 17.

== NFL career statistics ==
Legend
**Bold**	Career high

=== Regular season ===
Year	Team	Games		Tackles						Interceptions					Fumbles				
Year	Team	GP	GS	Cmb	Solo	Ast	Sck	TFL	Sfty	PD	Int	Yds	Lng	TD	FF	Fum	FR	Yds	TD
2018	DEN	13	1	20	17	3	0.0	0	0	3	**1**	4	4	0	0	0	0	0	0
2019	DEN	16	8	43	32	11	0.0	**1**	0	4	0	0	0	0	0	0	0	0	0
2020	NYG	16	**10**	**46**	29	**17**	**0.5**	0	0	5	0	0	0	0	1	0	0	0	0
2021	GB	16	1	10	9	1	0.0	0	0	0	0	0	0	0	0	0	0	0	0
2022	HOU	3	0	0	0	0	0.0	0	0	0	0	0	0	0	0	0	0	0	0
2022	NO	6	0	2	1	1	0.0	0	0	0	0	0	0	0	0	0	0	0	0
2023	NO	**17**	8	37	25	12	0.0	0	0	**14**	**1**	0	0	0	0	0	1	0	0
2024	SF	**17**	5	**46**	**38**	8	0.0	0	0	6	**1**	**11**	**11**	0	**2**	0	**2**	0	0
2025	NO	14	1	26	19	7	0.0	**1**	0	0	0	0	0	0	0	0	0	0	0
2026	WAS	3	0	0	0	0	0.0	0	0	0	0	0	0	0	0	0	0	0	0
Career		121	34	230	170	60	0.5	2	0	32	3	15	11	0	3	0	3	0	0

== Personal life ==
Yiadom is the son of Ghanaian immigrants, and has used the NFL's My Cause, My Cleats initiative to support the nonprofit organization Pencils of Promise, which provides resources to improve educational opportunities in his family's native Ghana. He graduated from Boston College with a bachelor's degree in communications. He has a younger brother, Paul, who played linebacker for Central Connecticut. Yiadom is engaged to Savannah Montano .
