= Zach Azzanni =

American football coach & player (born 1976)

Las Vegas Raiders
- Title: Wide receivers coach

Personal information
- Born: August 10, 1976 (age 50); St. Louis, Missouri, U.S.

Career information
- College: Central Michigan (1994-1998)

Career history
- Valparaiso (1999–2000) Wide receivers coach; Bowling Green (2001–2002) Graduate assistant; Bowling Green (2003–2006) Wide receivers coach; Central Michigan (2007–2009) Assistant head coach & wide receivers coach; Florida (2010) Passing game coordinator & wide receivers coach; Western Kentucky (2011) Offensive coordinator & wide receivers coach; Wisconsin (2012) Wide receivers coach; Tennessee (2013–2014) Recruiting coordinator & wide receivers coach; Tennessee (2015–2016) Passing game coordinator & wide receivers coach; Chicago Bears (2017) Wide receivers coach; Denver Broncos (2018–2022) Wide receivers coach; New York Jets (2023) Wide receivers coach; Pittsburgh Steelers (2024–2025) Wide receivers coach; Las Vegas Raiders (2026–present) Wide receivers coach

Zach Azzanni (born August 10, 1976) is an American football coach who is the wide receivers coach for the Las Vegas Raiders of the National Football League (NFL). Azzanni, who enters his 29th season coaching wide receivers, previously coached with the Pittsburgh Steelers, New York Jets, Denver Broncos, and Chicago Bears following 18 years at the college level.

== Early life ==
Azzanni played college football as a wide receiver at Central Michigan University from 1994 to 1998. He graduated from Central Michigan with a degree in sports management in 1999.

== Coaching career ==
=== College ===
Azzanni began his coaching career as wide receivers coach for Valparaiso University in 1999. He spent two seasons there before working as a graduate assistant under Head Coach Urban Meyer at Bowling Green from 2001 to 2002. Azzanni remained at Bowling Green after Meyer left to become Utah's head coach in 2003 and coached receivers for four seasons. Azzanni then served as the wide receivers coach, as well as the assistant head coach, at Central Michigan University. His CMU teams compiled a three-year record of 28–13, including three consecutive bowl appearances.

Azzanni was hired by Florida after the 2009 college regular season. In his first game coaching with the Gators—the 2010 Sugar Bowl—quarterback Tim Tebow threw for a career-high 482 yards in the Gators’ 51–24 win against Cincinnati. Azzanni then went on to be the offensive coordinator/wide receivers coach at Western Kentucky in 2011 for one season. In 2012, he spent one season coaching the wide receivers at the University of Wisconsin.

In 2013, Azzanni joined and spent four years at the University of Tennessee. He joined the Vols as wide receivers coach/recruiting coordinator before being promoted to passing game coordinator/wide receivers coach in 2015. Tennessee went to three consecutive bowl games from 2014 to 2016, winning each contest and averaging nearly 43 points per outing. The Vols’ passing attack in 2016, which featured six different players with at least 200 yards receiving, helped the offense set school records for single-season points (473) and touchdowns (63).

=== NFL ===
==== Chicago Bears ====
The Chicago Bears hired Azzanni as their wide receivers coach for the 2017 season.

==== Denver Broncos ====
The Denver Broncos hired Azzanni as their wide receivers coach on January 22, 2018.

==== New York Jets ====
The New York Jets hired Azzanni as their wide receivers coach on February 20, 2023.

==== Pittsburgh Steelers ====
The Pittsburgh Steelers hired Azzanni as their wide receivers coach on February 8, 2024.

==== Las Vegas Raiders ====
On February 18, 2026, the Las Vegas Raiders hired Azzanni as their wide receivers coach under new head coach Klint Kubiak.

== Coaching success ==
Azzanni has experienced three Bowl seasons at Central Michigan, a BCS All State Sugar Bowl win, another Outback Bowl win at Florida, 2 Bowl wins while Wide Receiver's Coach at Bowling Green, including one over Big Ten Opponent Northwestern and a TaxSlayer Gator Bowl and Outback Bowl win at Tennessee against the Iowa Hawkeyes. Players he has coached include Antonio Brown (CMU), Charles Sharon (Bowling Green), and Western Kentucky running back Bobby Rainey.
