= Jeff Heuerman =

American football player (born 1992)

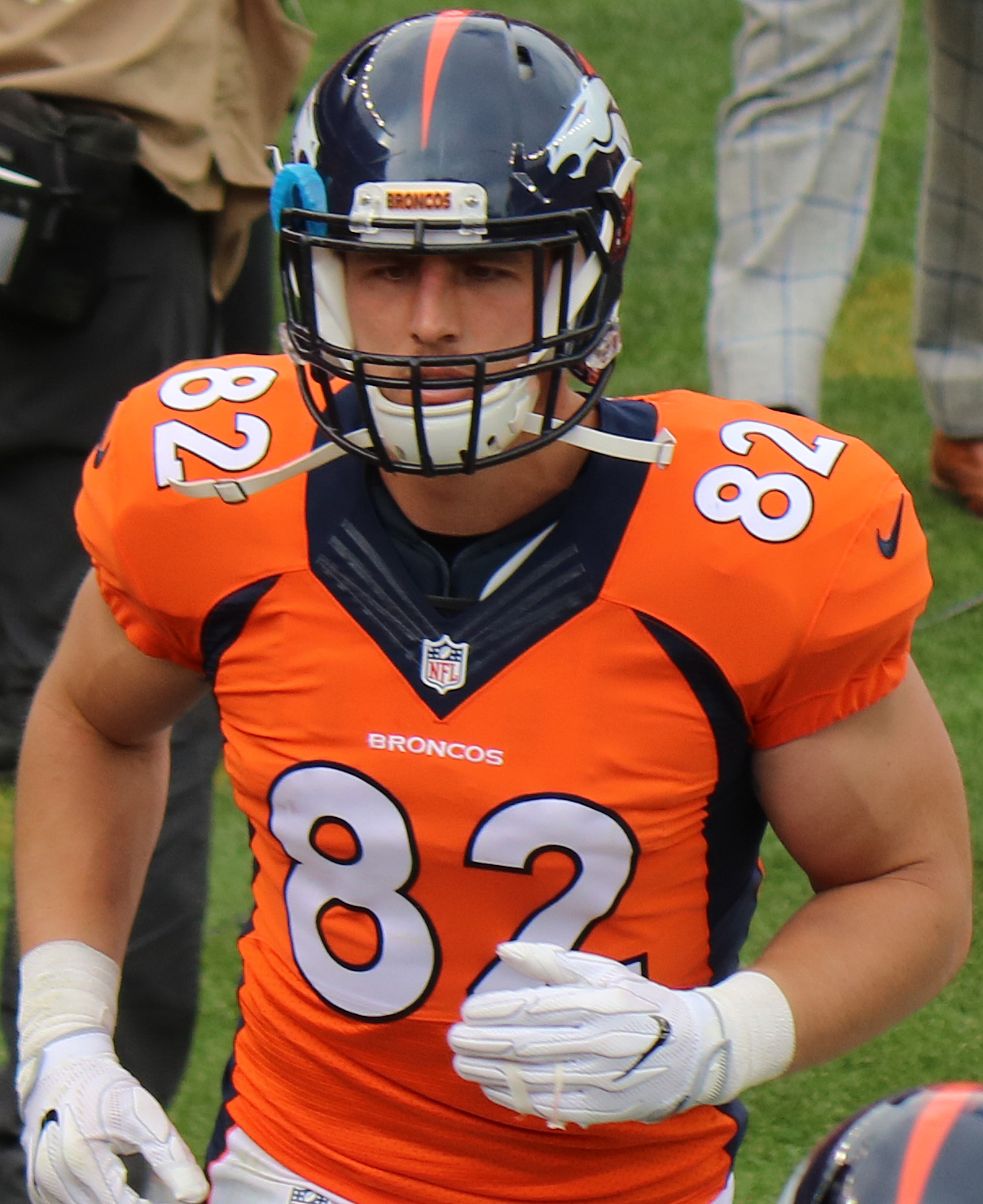
- Heuerman with the Denver Broncos in 2016

No. 82
- Position: Tight end

Personal information
- Born: November 24, 1992 (age 33); Naples, Florida, U.S.
- Listed height: 6 ft 5 in (1.96 m)
- Listed weight: 255 lb (116 kg)

Career information
- High school: Barron G. Collier (Naples)
- College: Ohio State (2011–2014)
- NFL draft: 2015: 3rd round, 92nd overall pick

Career history
- Denver Broncos (2015–2019)

Awards and highlights
- Super Bowl champion (50); CFP national champion (2015); Second-team All-Big Ten (2014)

Career NFL statistics
- Receptions: 63
- Receiving yards: 678
- Receiving touchdowns: 5
- Stats at Pro Football Reference

Jeff Heuerman (born November 24, 1992) is an American former professional football player who was a tight end for the Denver Broncos of the National Football League (NFL). He played college football for the Ohio State Buckeyes, and in 2015 won the CFP National Championship. He was selected by the Broncos in the third round of the 2015 NFL draft, where he played until 2019.

== Early life ==
Heuerman was an avid hockey player growing up, playing the sport for eight years. He spent one year living in Detroit with his grandfather, to play hockey for the Detroit Compuware team. He played football at Barron Collier High School in Naples, Florida, where he also excelled in track and basketball.

Considered a three-star recruit by Rivals.com, Heuerman was rated as the 18th-best tight end prospect of his class.

== College career ==
Heuerman enrolled early at Ohio State University, joining the Ohio State Buckeyes football team in January 2011. As a freshman, he played in 10 games, making his lone catch on the season against Florida in the 2012 Gator Bowl. As a sophomore, he played in all 12 games, including nine starts. He had eight receptions on the year for 94 yards, including his first collegiate touchdown, an 18-yard score against Nebraska. As a junior, Heuerman led all Buckeyes receivers by averaging 17.9 yards per reception with 26 receptions for 466 yards and four touchdowns, and earned himself conference honorable mention honors. As a senior, he had 17 receptions for 207 yards and two touchdowns.

== Professional career ==
=== Pre-draft ===
On December 14, 2014, it was announced that Heuerman accepted his invitation to play in the 2015 Senior Bowl, along with teammates Doran Grant and Michael Bennett. Unfortunately, Heuerman was unable to play in the Senior Bowl after suffering an ankle injury late in his senior season. He was one of 19 collegiate tight ends to attend the NFL Scouting Combine in Indianapolis, Indiana. He was limited to performing the bench press and tied Penn State's Jesse James for second among all tight ends, behind Louisville's Gerald Christian. On March 13, 2015, Heuerman attended Ohio States pro day and performed the majority of combine drills. He attended a private visit with representatives from the Pittsburgh Steelers. He was projected to be a third- or fourth-round pick by NFL draft experts and scouts. Heuerman was ranked as the third best tight end prospect in the draft by Sports Illustrated and NFLDraftScout.com and was ranked the fifth best tight end by NFL analysts Charles Davis and Mike Mayock.

Pre-draft measurables
Height	Weight	Arm length	Hand span	Wingspan	40-yard dash	10-yard split	20-yard split	Vertical jump	Broad jump	Bench press
6 ft 5 1/8 in (1.96 m)	254 lb (115 kg)	33 1/4 in (0.84 m)	10 1/8 in (0.26 m)	6 ft 8 1/4 in (2.04 m)	4.81 s	1.63 s	2.75 s	34.5 in (0.88 m)	10 ft 0 in (3.05 m)	26 reps
All values from NFL Combine/Ohio State's Pro Day

=== 2015 ===
The Denver Broncos selected Heuerman in the third round (92nd overall) of the 2015 NFL draft. He was the fourth tight end selected in 2015. On May 9, 2015, he tore his ACL in rookie camps and was ruled out for the 2015 season. On June 4, 2015, the Broncos signed Heuerman to a four-year, $2.81 million contract that includes a signing bonus of $620,806.

On February 7, 2016, Heuerman was part of the Broncos team that won Super Bowl 50. In the game, the Broncos defeated the Carolina Panthers by a score of 24–10. However, Heuerman did not play due to injury.

=== 2016 ===
Throughout training camp, Heuerman competed against Virgil Green, Garrett Graham, Manasseh Garner, and Henry Krieger-Coble for the vacant starting tight end position after the departures of Owen Daniels and Vernon Davis in free agency. On August 17, 2016, Heuerman suffered a hamstring injury during practice and missed the entire preseason. Head coach Gary Kubiak named Heuerman the backup tight end behind Green to start the season.

He missed the first two games of the season due to his hamstring injury. On September 25, 2016, he made his professional regular season debut in a Week 3 matchup at the Cincinnati Bengals and caught one pass for 29 yards in their 29–17 victory. In Week 6, Heuerman was a healthy scratch after Green returned from an injury that caused him to miss three consecutive games. On December 25, 2016, Heuerman earned his first career start after Green and A. J. Derby were both declared inactive with injuries. He caught a season-high three passes for 32 yards during a 33–10 loss at the Kansas City Chiefs. He finished his first active season with nine receptions for 141 receiving yards in 12 games and two starts.

=== 2017 ===
Under new head coach Vance Joseph, Heuerman competed against Green, Derby, and Krieger-Coble for the starting tight end position. He was named the second tight end behind Green to begin the 2017 season.

On October 15, 2017, Heuerman caught his first career touchdown on a 13-yard pass from Trevor Siemian in the fourth quarter during a 23–10 loss at the New York Giants. On December 14, 2017, he caught a career-long 54-yard touchdown pass from quarterback Brock Osweiler in the Broncos' 25–13 victory at the Indianapolis Colts. He finished the 2017 season with nine receptions for 142 receiving yards and four receiving touchdowns in 14 games and six starts.

=== 2018 ===
Heuerman entered the 2018 season slated as the Broncos starting tight end. He played in 11 games with 10 starts, recording a career-high 31 catches for 281 yards and two touchdowns. In Week 12, he suffered three broken ribs and a bruised lung and was ruled out for the rest of the season. He was placed on injured reserve on November 27, 2018.

=== 2019 ===
On March 15, 2019, Heuerman signed a two-year, $9 million contract extension with the Broncos. In the 2019 season, Heuerman finished with 14 receptions for 114 receiving yards and one receiving touchdown in 14 games and 11 starts.

On July 31, 2020, Heuerman was released by the Broncos.

== Personal life ==
Heuerman was born to Melissa and Paul Heuerman and has two younger brothers, Mike and Matt. His younger brother, Mike, played tight end at the University of Notre Dame.
