= Elijah Wilkinson =

American football player (born 1995)

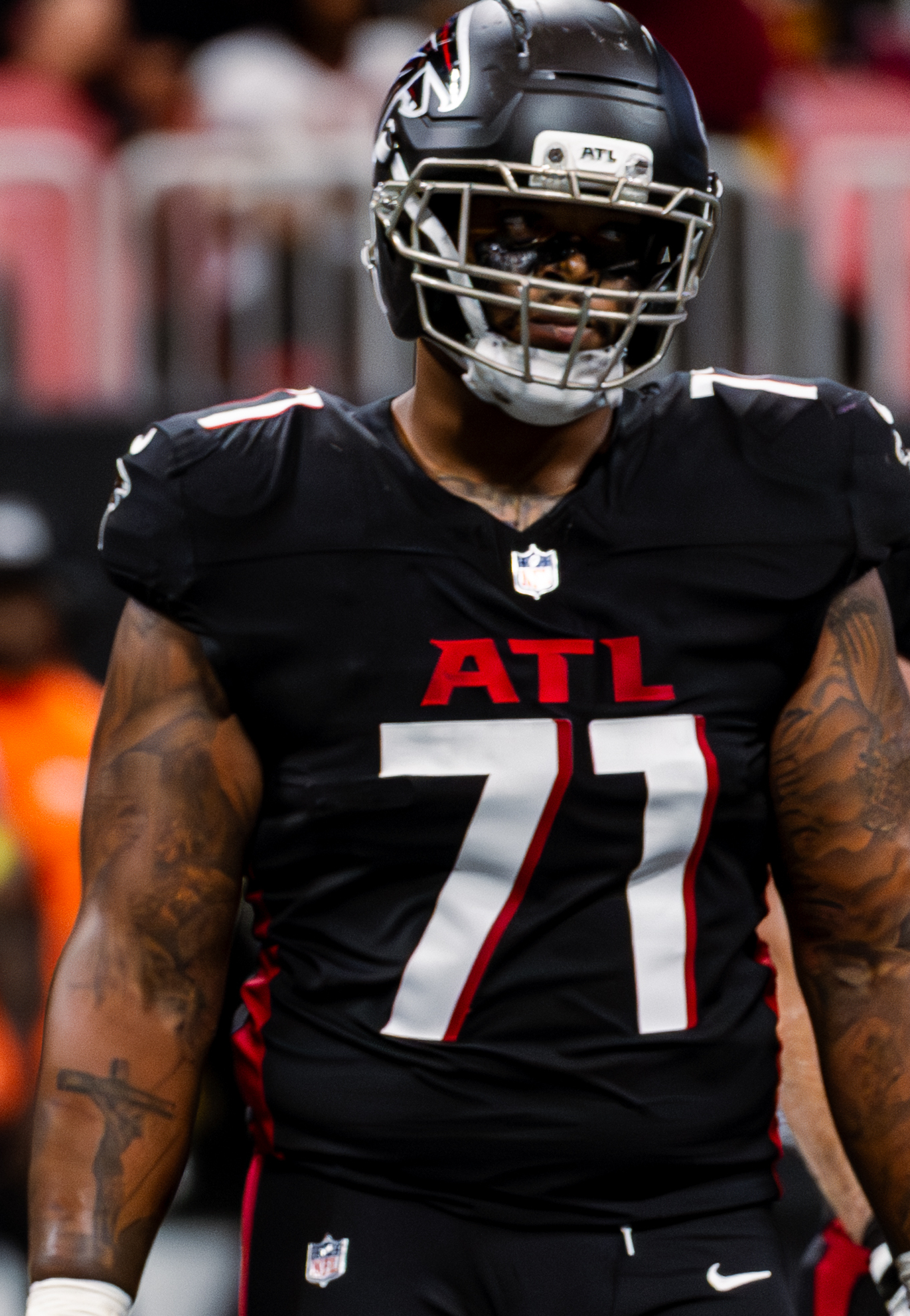
- Wilkinson with the Atlanta Falcons in 2025

No. 65 – Arizona Cardinals
- Position: Offensive tackle
- Roster status: Active

Personal information
- Born: February 10, 1995 (age 31); Downingtown, Pennsylvania, U.S.
- Listed height: 6 ft 5 in (1.96 m)
- Listed weight: 315 lb (143 kg)

Career information
- High school: Downingtown West
- College: UMass (2013–2016)
- NFL draft: 2017: undrafted

Career history
- Denver Broncos (2017–2020); Chicago Bears (2021); Atlanta Falcons (2022); Arizona Cardinals (2023); Atlanta Falcons (2024–2025); Arizona Cardinals (2026–present)

Career NFL statistics as of Week 5, 2026
- Games played: 101
- Games started: 67
- Stats at Pro Football Reference

Elijah Wilkinson (born February 10, 1995) is an American professional football offensive tackle for the Arizona Cardinals of the National Football League (NFL). He played college football for the UMass Minutemen and signed with the Denver Broncos as an undrafted free agent in 2017. Wilkinson has also been a member of the Chicago Bears and Atlanta Falcons.

== Professional career ==
Pre-draft measurables
Height	Weight	Arm length	Hand span	Wingspan	Bench press
6 ft 5 1/4 in (1.96 m)	328 lb (149 kg)	34 in (0.86 m)	10 1/2 in (0.27 m)	6 ft 9 1/2 in (2.07 m)	27 reps
All values from Pro Day

=== Denver Broncos ===
Wilkinson signed with the Denver Broncos as an undrafted free agent on May 11, 2017. He was waived by the Broncos on September 2, and was re-signed to the practice squad the following day. Wilkinson was promoted to the active roster on October 21.

Wilkinson signed a one-year restricted free agent tender with the Broncos on April 18, 2020. He was placed on the active/physically unable to perform list at the start of training camp on July 28, and moved back to the active roster six days later. Wilkinson started the first three games of 2020 at right tackle before being placed on injured reserve on September 30, with a fractured shinbone. He was activated on November 21.

=== Chicago Bears ===
Wilkinson signed a one-year contract with the Chicago Bears on March 23, 2021.

=== Atlanta Falcons (first stint) ===
On March 17, 2022, Wilkinson signed a one-year contract with the Atlanta Falcons. He was named the starting left guard to begin the season. He started seven games before being placed on injured reserve on November 5. Wilkerson was activated on December 17.

=== Arizona Cardinals ===
On April 5, 2023, Wilkinson signed with the Arizona Cardinals. He was named the Cardinals' starting left guard to begin the regular season. Wilkerson was placed on injured reserve on October 28, with a neck injury. He was activated on December 16.

On March 13, 2024, Wilkinson re-signed with the Cardinals. He was released by Arizona as part of the team's final roster cuts on August 27.

=== Atlanta Falcons (second stint) ===
On August 30, 2024, Wilkinson was signed to the practice squad of the Atlanta Falcons, returning to the team that he started nine games for during the 2022 season. He was promoted to the active roster on September 24.

=== Arizona Cardinals (second stint) ===
On March 12, 2026, Wilkinson signed a two-year, $6.25 million contract with the Arizona Cardinals.

== Personal life ==
Born in the United States, Wilkinson is of Puerto Rican descent.
