= U.S. national anthem kneeling protests =

Series of protests by American athletes

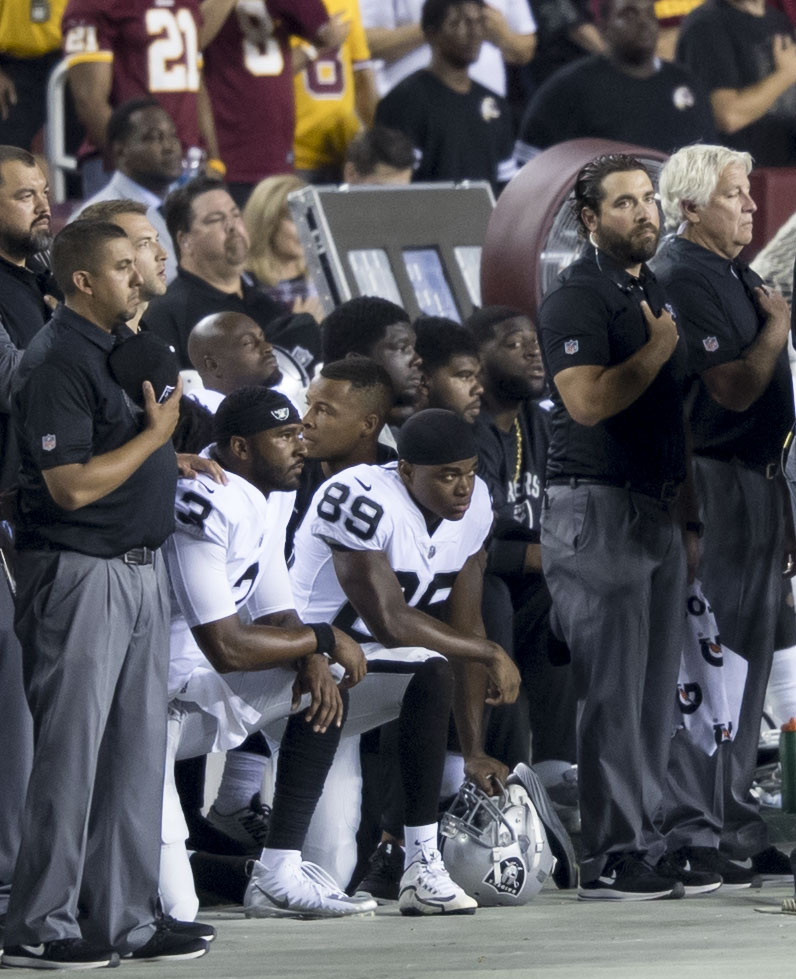
- Oakland Raiders players kneeling during the national anthem in 2017
- Date: August 14, 2016–largely subsided by the mid-2020s (10 years, 3 months and 1 week)
- Location: National Football League stadiums
- Goals: To raise awareness of racism and police brutality; Freedom of speech
- Methods: Peaceful protest

Beginning in August 2016, some American athletes, most of whom are African Americans, have protested against systemic racism in the United States by kneeling on one knee while the U.S. national anthem is played. Beginning in 2017, many players also protested against President Donald Trump's criticisms of those involved in the protest, and some against Trump's policies during his first term in office. Some observers have praised the players' social awareness. The act itself has become widely referred to as "taking the knee" or "taking a knee". Backlash to athletes kneeling often includes heavy criticism of the athletes for being unpatriotic; internet backlash against the players has raised questions over their right to freedom of speech.

The protests began in the National Football League (NFL) after San Francisco 49ers quarterback Colin Kaepernick sat and later knelt during the anthem, before his team's preseason games of 2016. Throughout the following seasons, members of various NFL and other sports teams have engaged in similar silent protests. On September 24, 2017, the NFL protests became more widespread when over 200 players sat or knelt in reaction to Trump's call for owners to "fire" the protesting players.

Coverage since 2021 indicates the kneeling protests largely subsided, with false reports about renewed kneeling debunked, while league social-justice displays continued via the Inspire Change program, end-zone slogans (including a Super Bowl LIX switch to "Choose Love"), and performances of "Lift Every Voice and Sing", widely considered the Black national anthem.

== Background ==
It is a tradition in the United States to play "The Star-Spangled Banner", the national anthem, before sporting events. According to the United States Code, those present should stand at attention with right hand over heart. National Football League (NFL) players were not mandated to be on the field for the playing of the national anthem until 2009. In 2016 the NFL stated that "players are encouraged but not required to stand during the playing of the National Anthem"; its game operations manual reads that players "should stand" for the anthem.

Kaepernick and his 49ers teammate Eric Reid said they choose to kneel in San Diego during the anthem to call attention to the issues of racial inequality and police brutality. "After hours of careful consideration, and even a visit from Nate Boyer, a retired Green Beret and former NFL player, we came to the conclusion that we should kneel, rather than sit, ... during the anthem, as a peaceful protest," said Reid. "We chose to kneel because it's a respectful gesture. I remember thinking our posture was like a flag flown at half-mast to mark a tragedy." Some regard kneeling as disrespectful to those who have died or been wounded in service of the United States, such as police officers or military veterans. Torrey Smith, ex-wide receiver for the Carolina Panthers, had said in an interview: "I understand why people are offended by people protesting the National Anthem. My father served 25 years. When he dies, he's going to be wrapped in an American flag. But my dad is also out of the Army, and he drives trucks all over the country, and he's a black man everywhere he goes, and sometimes he has racial incidents still today. That doesn't protect him, just because he served our country. And I think that's important."

Kaepernick stated "I am not going to get up to show pride in a country that oppresses black people and people of color." Kaepernick has expressed his concerns about how his actions have been labeled as "anthem protest", since he considers this to be a diversion strategy from his critics to deviate the discussion from what really matters. "I am not protesting the anthem or the nation, I'm protesting organized brutality. To me, this is much bigger than football and it would be selfish to look the other way. There are bodies in the street and people getting paid leave and getting away with murder."

Critics of kneeling players characterized the movement as unpatriotic and self-serving.

Kaepernick was not able to sign a contract with any NFL team even after he opted out of his contract with the 49ers and became a free agent in 2017, presumably because of his actions of taking a knee. Nevertheless, even though Kaepernick was no longer on the sideline, his movement did not stop but rather gained more participants.

== Causes ==
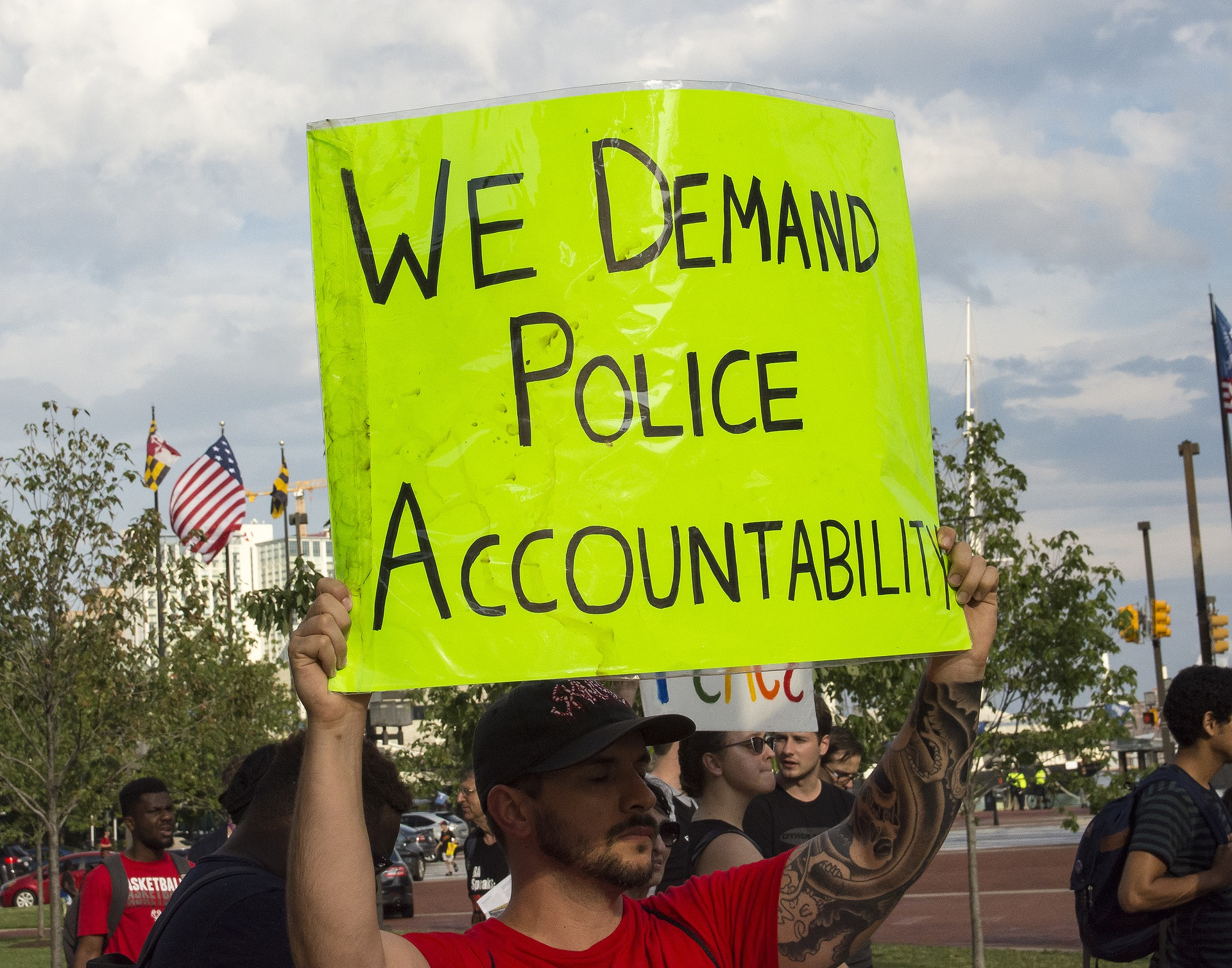
Protestors demanding police accountability

Criminal justice reform is one of the top issues that NFL players have been supporting in their protests. Kaepernick was initially moved to protest by the deaths of African-Americans at the hands of police or while in police custody. These deaths gained prominence through the media and the Black Lives Matter movement in the years immediately preceding the protest. During a post-game interview on August 26, 2016, he stated, "I am not going to stand up to show pride in a flag for a country that oppresses black people and people of color. To me, this is bigger than football and it would be selfish on my part to look the other way. There are bodies in the street and people getting paid leave and getting away with murder", adding that he would continue to protest during the anthem until he feels like "[the United States flag] represents what it's supposed to represent."

After that interview, Kaepernick pledged to donate the first $1 million of his $11.9 million salary from the 2016–2017 season to different organizations that help communities in need. He pledged to donate $100,000 per month for 10 months to various organizations. Days later, the San Francisco 49ers matched Kaepernick by pledging $1 million to two organizations addressing racial and social inequality. Kaepernick has been following through on his commitment and has donated $900,000 (~$1.16 million in 2025) as of September 2017 to groups including Meals on Wheels, United We Dream, Black Veterans for Social Justice and many others. Kaepernick has also held "Know Your Rights" camps for young people of color. The camps include legal education from attorneys that give advice on how to interact with police when being detained and lectures from prominent academics on the history of the Civil Rights Movement in the United States. The National Football League Players Association (NFLPA) named Kaepernick the Week One MVP in September 2017 for his charity work related to the protest. Kaepernick also joined the 10 for 10 challenge, which basically consists of donating ten thousand dollars for ten consecutive days. Some major celebrities that matched Kaepernick's donations include basketball players Steph Curry and Kevin Durant, tennis player Serena Williams, singer Usher, and rappers Snoop Dogg and Meek Mill.

=== Trump calls for firing protesting players ===
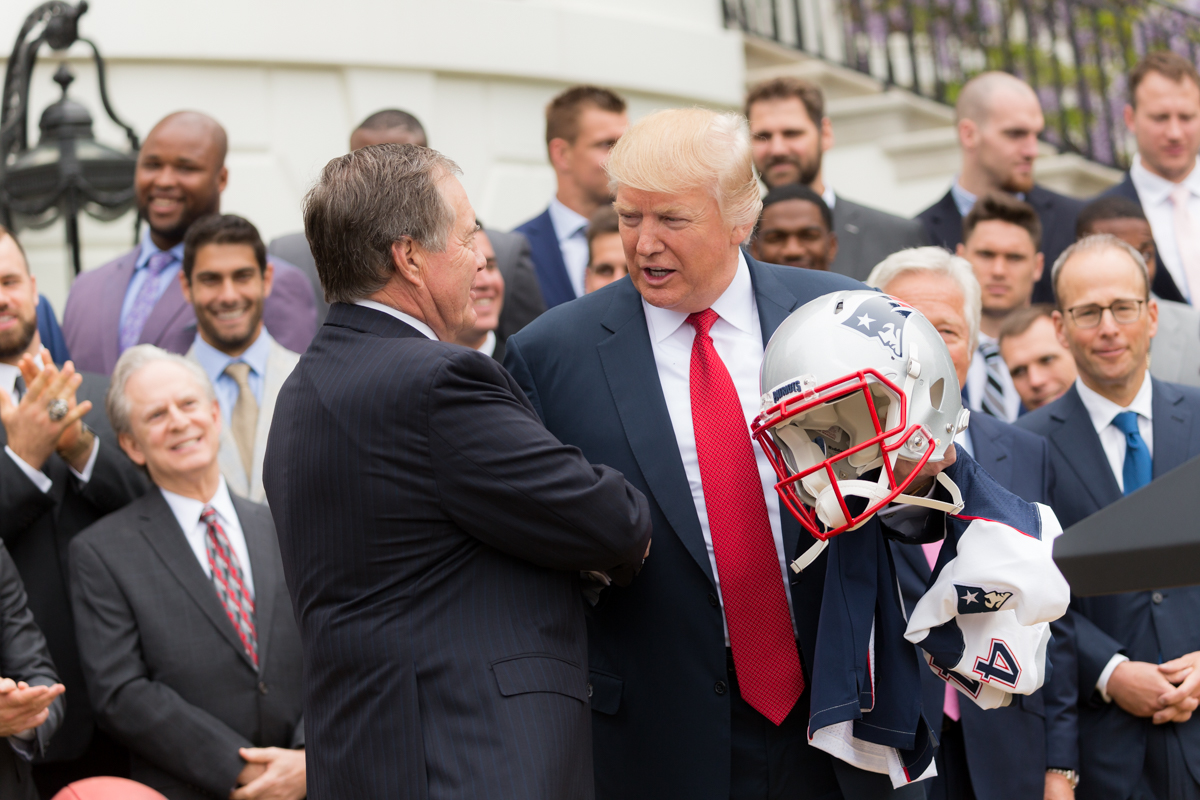
President Trump meeting with the players and staff of New England Patriots at the White House on April 19, 2017, following their Super Bowl LI win over the Atlanta Falcons

In September 2017 at a rally in Huntsville, Alabama, President Trump said NFL owners should fire players who kneel during the national anthem and encouraged fans to walk out. Trump stated he would love to see NFL owners say, "get that son of a bitch off the field right now, out, he's fired. He's fired!" He called the players' protest "a total disrespect of our heritage". Trump added on that the new NFL safety rules created to protect players from concussions were ruining the game for the public. His statement came after a new research indicated that NFL players are at high risk for chronic traumatic encephalopathy (CTE) due to the likelihood of multiple head injuries.

Trump said his criticism of the protesters was not related to race. "This has to do with respect for our country and respect for our flag," he said. In the games immediately following Trump's statements, the protest gained broader participation when over 200 players sat or knelt during the anthem, others linked arms with their teammates or raised fists, and three teams chose to stay in the locker room for the anthem. However, the response quickly turned into one towards Trump, rather than Kaepernick's original protests of racial injustice, which took away largely from Kaepernick's original message. Reasons cited by players, owners, and coaches included supporting freedom of speech and opposing what they considered intimidation by Trump. Others said they took offense to Trump demeaning the integrity of their primarily African American colleagues, when a month earlier he had hesitated to condemn the white nationalists who protested in Charlottesville, Virginia, and murdered a counter protester. The reaction to Trump's remarks were amidst other ongoing issues his administration was facing, including failed attempts at healthcare reform, the primary election loss of Trump-backed candidate Luther Strange for the Alabama seat in the U.S. Senate, recovery efforts for Hurricane Maria in Puerto Rico, Hurricane Irma in Florida, and Hurricane Harvey in Houston, and relations with North Korea over their nuclear and missile testing.

Many players beyond the 2017 season have knelt or raised fists in protest against Trump's policies. Other Republicans such as Florida senator Marco Rubio also expressed their discomforts against these policies as well. While Rubio's objections were not aimed directly at President Trump, he did support the rights of players of kneeling during the national anthem, especially Miami Dolphins player Kenny Stills. He tweeted, "No @NFL player does more community service than @KStills of the @MiamiDolphins. You don't have to agree with how or why he has chosen to exercise the 1st Amendment before every game to acknowledge the hours he gives voluntarily, on his day off, to serve his fellow Americans." Rubio has also expressed his feeling about Kaepernick, and while he publicly stated that he does not agree with what Kaepernick does (taking a knee during the national anthem), he does support his rights that allows him to do so and he believes that the NFL should not prohibit him from playing in the league again.

== NFL protests ==
=== 2016 preseason ===
Kaepernick began sitting during the national anthem at the start of the 2016 NFL preseason. His actions went unnoticed for two weeks before he was questioned by the media. In the 49ers' final 2016 preseason game on September 1, 2016, after talking to Boyer, Kaepernick opted to kneel during the U.S. national anthem rather than sit as he did in their previous games. He explained his decision to switch was an attempt to show more respect to former and current U.S. military members while still protesting during the anthem. Eric Reid joined Kaepernick in kneeling during the national anthem during the final preseason game. Seattle Seahawks player Jeremy Lane also did not stand for the anthem during his final preseason game the same day, stating, "It's something I plan to keep on doing until justice is being served."

=== 2016 season ===
In Week 1, eleven NFL players joined Kaepernick's protests. Denver Broncos player Brandon Marshall knelt during the national anthem prior to the start of the Kickoff game, which was broadcast on NBC. The act of kneeling as protest has been referred to as "taking a knee". Kaepernick and Marshall were teammates at the University of Nevada.

Kaepernick and Marshall were by no means the first pro football players to be seen kneeling on the field. Beginning in 2011, the Denver Broncos' then-quarterback Tim Tebow was seen kneeling on the sidelines, as if in prayer, often enough to inspire the neologism "Tebowing". Tebow was awarded a trademark for that term in 2012. (Tebow's actions were not considered controversial at the time.)

On September 11, Kansas City Chiefs cornerback Marcus Peters raised his fist while the rest of the team interlocked their arms showing solidarity. Two members of the New England Patriots, Devin McCourty and Martellus Bennett, raised their fists on Sunday Night Football. The entire Seattle Seahawks team stood and interlocked arms. Jelani Jenkins, Arian Foster, Kenny Stills, and Michael Thomas of the Miami Dolphins all knelt during the National Anthem. At the same time, a group of Jacksonville Jaguars players, led by cornerback Prince Amukamara, initially planned to join the protest but chose not to do so after photographs of Kaepernick wearing socks with a crude anti-police message during training camp were made public.

On November 13, 2016, five days after Donald Trump was elected President, Tampa Bay Buccaneers wide-receiver Mike Evans decided to sit during the national anthem. According to Sports Illustrated, Evans said, "If this happens, then America's not right right now. I said this a long time ago. When he ran, I thought it was a joke, and the joke continues. I'm not a political person that much, but I got common sense. And I know when something's not right." However, his protest began the day following Veterans Day, so he received criticism. He quickly changed his method of protesting and joined his teammates during the following game against the Kansas City Chiefs. He apologized to veterans and other members of the military for his actions – citing that the timing of his protest was poor. "On the field, I'm going to continue to do what I do – play hard. I'm playing hard because I've got this right – freedom, because of the vets. I'm going to reach out to organizations, organizations that I feel are doing the best job to help the minority ... women, LGBT, African Americans, Latinos, people that are in fear of Donald Trump and his presidency."

=== 2017 season ===
Cleveland Browns tight end Seth DeValve became the first white football player to kneel or sit during the anthem on the team's August 21, 2017, preseason game against the New York Giants.

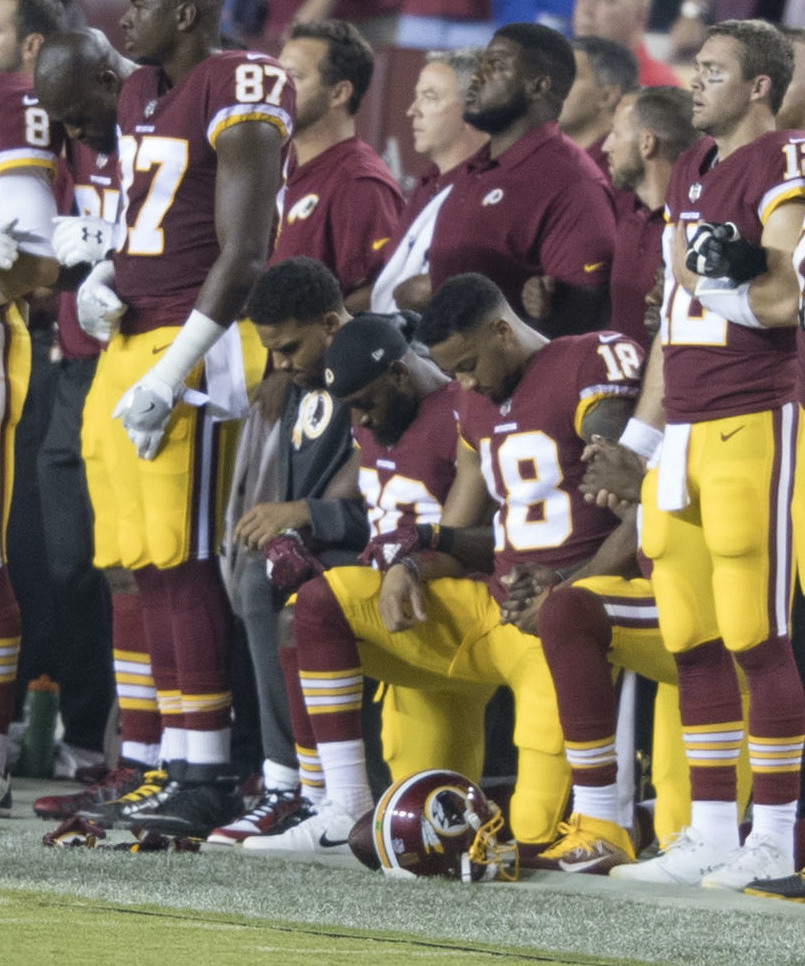
Washington Redskins players kneeling before the game with the Oakland Raiders

In Week 3 of the season the majority of games were played two days after Trump made his statements. The protest gained broader participation when over 200 players sat or knelt during the anthem. Many players, coaches and NFL teams protested and/or issued statements expressing dismay with Trump's comments:

- Twenty-seven members of the Baltimore Ravens and Jacksonville Jaguars knelt during the American national anthem at their game at Wembley Stadium in London. Retired Ravens star and honorary Team Captain Ray Lewis knelt with members of his team. All of the players stood for the British national anthem "God Save the Queen", with many remaining in locked arms.
- Several members of the Philadelphia Eagles raised their fists during the anthem before their game against the New York Giants. Before the same game, various Giants players stood with arms locked while others knelt.
- The Seattle Seahawks and the Tennessee Titans did not take the field during the playing of the anthem, staying in their locker rooms until it concluded. The players of the Seahawks released a statement saying, "We will not stand for the injustice that has plagued people of color in this country. Out of love for our country and in honor of the sacrifices made on our behalf, we unite to oppose those that would deny our most basic freedoms." Meghan Linsey, the Nashville singer who performed the anthem, knelt when she completed the song.
- Before the opening of their game against the Houston Texans, various New England Patriots players and staff also expressed their concerns, including quarterback Tom Brady locking arms with Phillip Dorsett, and head coach Bill Belichick crossing his arms in front of him. Sixteen members of the Patriots knelt during the anthem. Patriots owner Robert Kraft said he was disappointed at the tone in which Trump's comments were made.

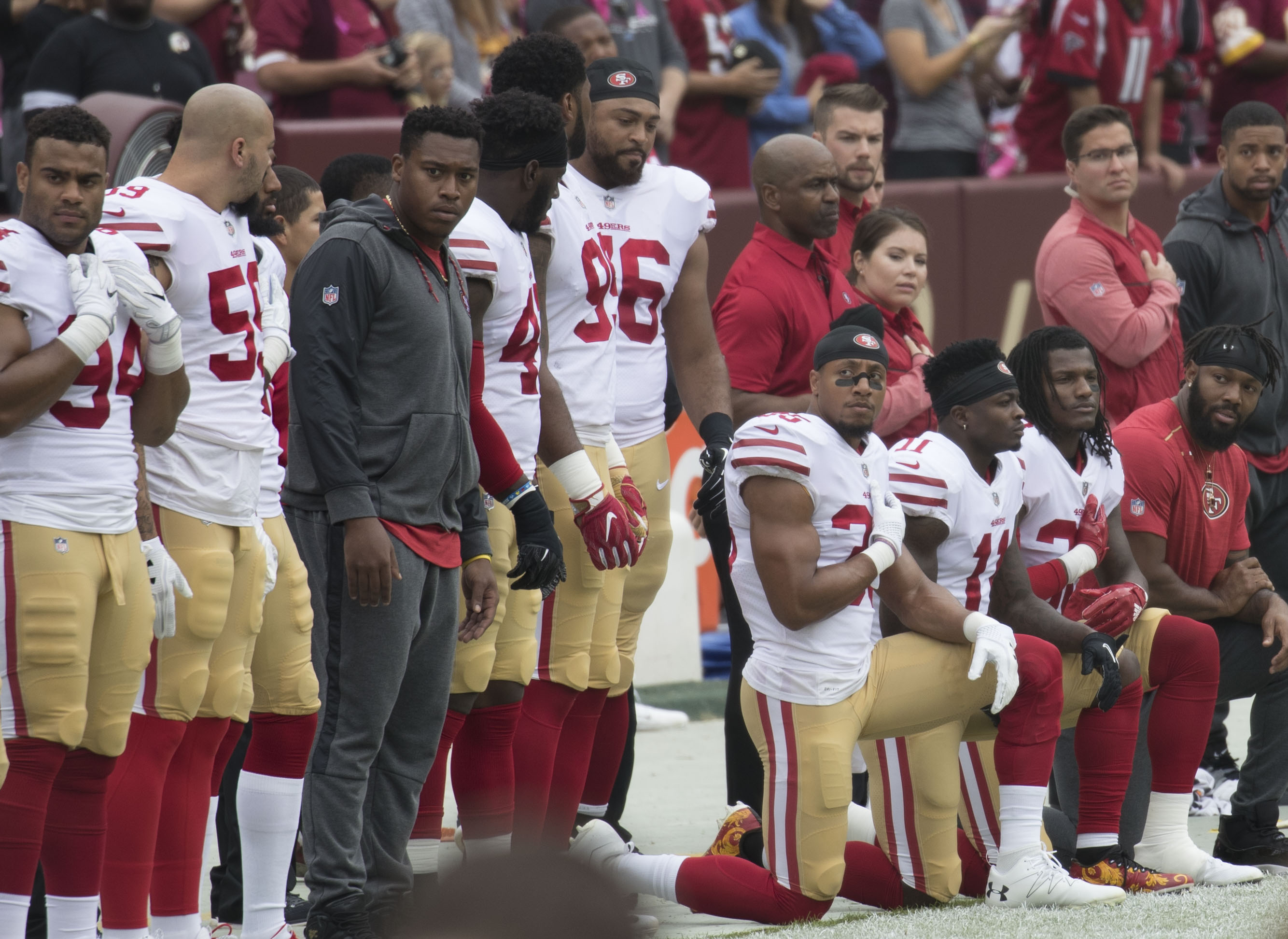
Members of the San Francisco 49ers kneeling during the National Anthem before a game against the Washington Redskins in week 6

- Several members of the Miami Dolphins wore "#IMWITHKAP" T-shirts on the field during the pregame warmup, in support of Kaepernick's actions. The team locked arms during the anthem, with five members kneeling. The opposing team, the New York Jets, also linked arms during the anthem.
- All Pittsburgh Steelers players except Alejandro Villanueva, who served as an Army Ranger, refused to leave the locker room during the anthem. On the sideline, the Chicago Bears players locked their arms while the anthem was performed. Villanueva has since expressed regret for his actions.
- The majority of the Oakland Raiders either sat or knelt during the anthem, with several members of the opposing Washington Redskins either kneeling or joining arms as well.
- Thirty-two members of the Denver Broncos knelt during the anthem. At least ten members of the Buffalo Bills also knelt during the anthem, while other team members locked arms. Running back LeSean McCoy said "My message to him (Trump) is, be a president, be respectful, man. You know, us Americans, we are together. Stop trying to divide us." McCoy performed stretches during the national anthem.
- The Dallas Cowboys and Arizona Cardinals players locked arms during the anthem, while everyone on the Cowboys, including owner and general manager Jerry Jones, knelt before the anthem was played.
- The New Orleans Saints established a plan with their team prior to their game against the Miami Dolphins on how they will handle the national anthem before the game. Drew Brees stated on Twitter prior to the game, "As a way to show respect to all, our #Saints team will kneel in solidarity prior to the national anthem & stand together during the anthem."
- More than ten Indianapolis Colts and about 20 Cleveland Browns players knelt on one knee while the remaining players locked arms during the playing of "The Star-Spangled Banner" in Indianapolis, Indiana. The actions were met by some boos from the crowd at Lucas Oil Stadium. Indiana is the home state of Vice President Mike Pence, who weeks later intentionally walked out of a Colts game against the 49ers.

On October 15, 2017, Colin Kaepernick filed a grievance for collusion against NFL owners. Instead of using the NFLPA, Kaepernick hired Mark Geragos to be his attorney. On February 15, 2019, the grievance was settled by mutual confidential agreement between the parties.

In Week 8 at Seattle, the majority of the Texans players knelt during the anthem after Houston owner Bob McNair had commented about having the "inmates running the prison" during a league owner meeting regarding the ongoing protest. McNair had apologized, stating that he was not referring to the players, but rather to the "relationship between the league office and team owners". It was the first time a Texans player had knelt during the anthem.

=== 2018 preseason ===
On May 23, 2018, NFL Commissioner Roger Goodell and all NFL team owners, except for two that abstained from voting in a show of hand voting process, approved a new policy that would require all players to stand during the national anthem or be given the option to stay in the locker room during the national anthem. The vote took place without consulting the NFLPA. The policy also stated that any players from all NFL teams who protested the anthem while on the field would become subject to discipline from the league. In addition, the teams as a whole would be subject to punishment and other forms of discipline from the NFL as a result.

In disagreement with the policy, several players on the Super Bowl champions Philadelphia Eagles indicated that they would decline an invitation from Trump to visit the White House on June 5, leading the President to rescind the offer the day before the event. The Eagles were the second sports franchise that Trump had uninvited, joining the 2017 National Basketball Association (NBA) champion Golden State Warriors, whose visit was cancelled after several players publicly declined to attend.

On July 19, the NFL and the players association issued a joint statement that "no rules relating to the anthem will be issued for the next several weeks." This came after the Associated Press had reported earlier in the day that Miami team rules stated that improper anthem conduct could result in a player suspension of up to four games, more than some players receive for violating the league's domestic violence policy. The following day, Trump tweeted that players should be suspended for one game the first time kneeling, and for the entire season without pay after a second offense.

=== 2018 season ===
On February 3, 2019, Maroon 5 headlined the Super Bowl LIII halftime show in Atlanta, Georgia, at Mercedes-Benz Stadium, with American rappers Big Boi and Travis Scott. The band's decision was controversial, because other musicians, including Cardi B and Rihanna, refused to perform. The musicians who pulled out did so to show their support for Colin Kaepernick and others who protested police brutality and racism by kneeling during the U.S. national anthem and faced repercussions by the NFL for doing so. The performance drew criticism from audiences and critics.

=== 2019 season ===
During the 2019 season, only three players continued to protest.

Eric Reid of the Carolina Panthers continued to kneel throughout the season. Reid was the first player on the Carolina Panthers to kneel during the playing of the national anthem.

Kenny Stills, who was traded to the Houston Texans, continued to kneel during the playing of the anthem. Stills said that he would continue to do so even if it were to threaten his career.

Albert Wilson of the Miami Dolphins continued to kneel during the playing of the national anthem.

=== 2020 season ===
After the creation of a video featuring NFL players, among them incumbent Super Bowl MVP Patrick Mahomes, asking the league to address racial inequalities following the May murder of George Floyd, commissioner Roger Goodell released a video of his own condemning racism and apologizing for the NFL's handling of previous protests. The league later announced plans to play "Lift Every Voice and Sing", also known as the Black national anthem, prior to "The Star-Spangled Banner" during Week 1 games. The season-opening game between the Houston Texans and Kansas City Chiefs saw the Texans remaining in the locker room during both songs, while Kansas City had its players on the sidelines, almost all of them standing. Alex Okafor was the only Chief to kneel and also raised his fist. The two teams later joined together at midfield for a moment of unity and silence, while social justice messages were displayed.

Both the Atlanta Falcons and Seattle Seahawks stood with their arms linked. Jamal Adams of the Seahawks raised his fist while others either knelt, sat or remained in the locker room. After the anthems, both teams knelt during a moment of silence.

The Miami Dolphins remained in the locker room prior to playing the home team New England Patriots who were the only team to not protest in any manner.

Both the Buffalo Bills and New York Jets remained in the locker rooms until just before kickoff.

Most of the Baltimore Ravens either knelt or sat on the bench. On the other side, Myles Garrett, KhaDarel Hodge, and Ronnie Harrison of the Cleveland Browns knelt.

Bisi Johnson, Tajae Sharpe, Alexander Mattison, Ameer Abdullah, Jalyn Holmes and Nate Meadors of the Minnesota Vikings knelt. This was the first time that any member of the Vikings did so. The visiting Green Bay Packers remained in the locker room. The Vikings' Gjallarhorn was not blown to call attention to "silenced voices".

Eight players on the Carolina Panthers including Teddy Bridgewater and Robby Anderson knelt while others locked arms and raised fists. Anderson plans on protesting for the entire season. The visiting Las Vegas Raiders linked arms. Trent Brown stood on his own behind everyone else, but did not protest.

Washington Football Team players knelt in unison during a moment of silence before standing during the Star-Spangled Banner. Several Football Team players raised their fists while the visiting Philadelphia Eagles remained in the locker room.

The Jacksonville Jaguars remained in the locker room while Indianapolis Colts head coach Frank Reich was the only person on the visiting sidelines to kneel.

Multiple players on the Chicago Bears knelt while others raised their fists. At least 21 remained in the locker room. The home team Detroit Lions did the same with players either kneeling or leaving the field.

Both the Cincinnati Bengals and Los Angeles Chargers stood with their arms linked. The Bengals are one of three teams to not have any kneeling players since the demonstrations began. The other two are Pittsburgh Steelers and Green Bay Packers.

Jerick McKinnon and Richie James of the San Francisco 49ers both sat on the bench while the visiting Arizona Cardinals remained in the locker room.

Malcolm Jenkins was the only player on the New Orleans Saints that protested. He remained in the locker room until the coin toss. The visiting Tampa Bay Buccaneers linked arms.

Dontari Poe was the lone player on the Dallas Cowboys that knelt making him the first Cowboy to do so. The hometown Los Angeles Rams saw twelve players kneel before the Sunday Night Football game.

Over twenty players on the New York Giants either knelt or raised their fists. The visiting Pittsburgh Steelers stood with linked arms hoisting an anti-racism sign while some raised their fists.

Every Denver Broncos player knelt or raised their fists during the anthem, as well as all Tennessee Titans players, except Derrick Henry.

On September 17, 2020, the Cincinnati Bengals and Cleveland Browns stood together with arms linked. None of the Browns players from the previous game knelt.

Later seasons

The NFL responded by increasing its promotion of social justice initiatives, including “Inspire Change” messaging and helmet decals with phrases like “End Racism.” The End Racism message written in the end zone was removed for Super Bowl LIX, the first game since the 2021 season without this message.

While social justice initiatives and off-field activism have continued, there have not been any major anthem protests since 2020.

== Other athletes join ==
=== Association football ===
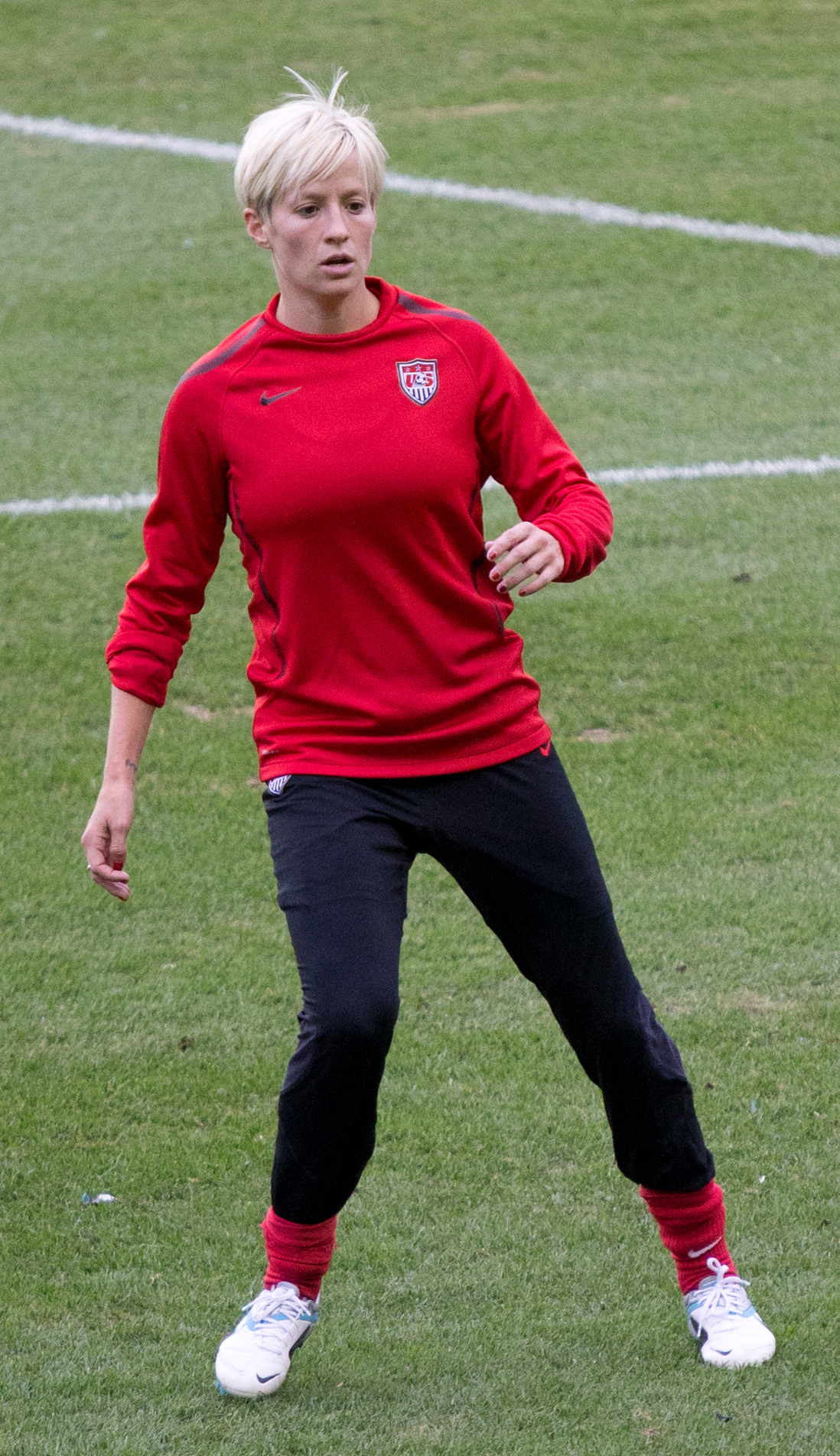
Megan Rapinoe in 2011

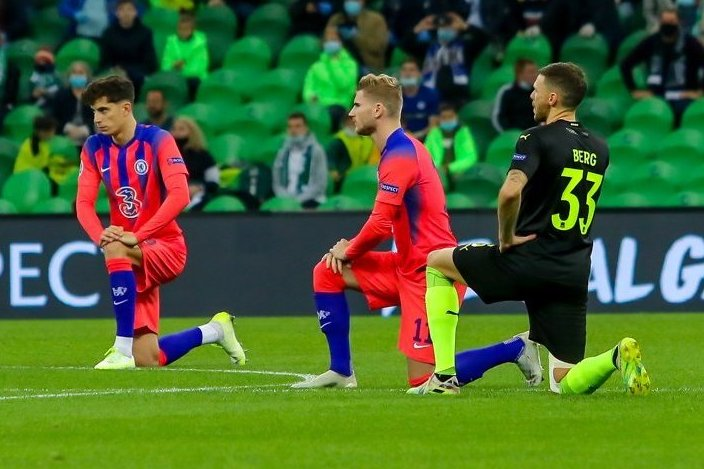
Players taking the knee at the opening whistle of a UEFA Champions League match between FC Krasnodar and Chelsea in October 2020

Seattle Reign FC and U.S. women's national soccer team (NWSL) player Megan Rapinoe knelt during the national anthem in a game on September 5, 2016, explaining that her decision was a "nod to Kaepernick and everything that he's standing for right now". In a subsequent match at the Washington Spirit, Spirit owner Bill Lynch – anticipating Rapinoe's protest – moved the national anthem's performance without warning or notice to occur before the players' appearances on the pitch. Jeff Plush, the league's commissioner, was present at the game and told reporters that he was unaware of Lynch's plans and disagreed with the act of moving the anthem's performance. The Spirit's players issued a joint statement also disagreeing with Lynch's decision to move the anthem without first consulting the team's players or coaches.

As a member of the U.S. women's national soccer team, Rapinoe also knelt before an international friendly match against Thailand on September 16, despite public statements of disagreement with her protest methods issued before the match by the U.S. Soccer Federation and her coach Jill Ellis. U.S. Soccer proceeded to pass a policy that required all of its players to stand "respectfully" during the national anthem, making it the first American sports league or governing body to do so.

Major League Soccer (MLS) released a statement in September 2017 regarding any potential protests. It said "The march of players, officials and children into our stadiums and singing of the anthem has been a pre-match tradition since our first game in 1996. The National Anthem provides our clubs and fans an important and time-honored opportunity to salute our country and stand up for its principles -- whether in the United States or in Canada." MLS to date, has yet to encounter national anthem protests.

The protest had supporters outside the U.S. as well. In an October 2017 match against Schalke 04, players and staff of German football club Hertha Berlin took the knee in solidarity. Hertha Berlin has several American players on their roster.

After the murder of George Floyd in May 2020, French player Marcus Thuram took a knee after scoring for Borussia Mönchengladbach in a Bundesliga match against 1. FC Union Berlin. The initial reaction of the DFB, the governing body for football in Germany, was to announce an investigation into on-field protests. The investigation was rapidly dropped after Gianni Infantino, president of FIFA, the world governing body, publicly stated that such protests are worthy of applause, not punishment. On June 1, 2020, Liverpool F.C. posted a picture of its first team squad taking a knee on its social media accounts with the caption "Unity is strength #BlackLivesMatter". The FA, the governing body in England, announced that it would take "a commonsense approach" if Premier League players took a knee in protest at the murder of George Floyd. On June 16, 2020, Aston Villa and Sheffield United contested the first English football fixture in 100 days, following the COVID-19 lockdown. After the referee blew his whistle for kick-off, all the players and the coaching staffs took the knee.

The protests inspired a vote of the U.S. Soccer board to repeal the ban on kneeling during the national anthem, and the new president of the federation personally apologized to Megan Rapinoe. The policy is expected to technically remain in force until voted on at the 2021 general meeting of the national council.

In the opening game of the 2020 NWSL Challenge Cup, all 22 starters from the Portland Thorns and North Carolina Courage knelt during the national anthem. A moment of silence was held prior to the opening game and players and staff wore Black Lives Matter shirts. Similar protests have continued throughout the Challenge Cup, with all players wearing Black Lives Matter shirts and many players kneeling.

During the UEFA Euro 2020 many national teams have agreed to take the knee before kickoff; UEFA has supported the display.

=== College ===
In February 2021, members of the Bluefield College men's basketball team were suspended for one game after kneeling during the national anthem.

On September 7, 2016, three volleyball players from West Virginia Tech knelt during the national anthem.

On October 1, at East Carolina University, about 19 members of the band knelt, while about another two held the American flag during the national anthem at the beginning of the football game against the University of Central Florida. There have been almost no such incidents involving college football players, for the simple reason that college players and coaches are typically in the locker room when the anthem is played. There has been at least one exception to the rule, however. During a September 2016 away game at Northwestern, where players are traditionally on the field during the anthem, three Nebraska players knelt on the sideline. The NCAA football rulebook does not address the issue of pregame ceremonies (patriotic or otherwise) at all, except to say that team captains must be present for a coin toss three minutes before the first-half kickoff.

College of the Ozarks president Jerry Davis announced in September 2017 that his college's teams would refuse to play any team whose players knelt during the anthem. In response, the NAIA chose to move its Division II men's basketball champion game away from College of the Ozarks' Keeter Gymnasium (where the championship game had been held since 2000) to Sanford Pentagon in Sioux Falls, South Dakota.

On February 23, 2019, eight players of the Ole Miss men's basketball team took a knee during the national anthem at their home-game against Georgia. The players took a knee to protest the pro-confederate rally that was happening on campus at the time. The players previously stood during the national anthem, with this being the first time they took the knee. The athletes were upset by a video posted online by the rally organizers a few days prior. The protest reached national attention and received negative backlash. However, the athletes received public support from University officials.

On September 24, 2016, Michigan football players Jordan Lewis and Khalid Hill raised their right arms in the air in support of the Anthem Protests.

=== High school ===
On September 2, 2016, a football player at Brunswick High School in Ohio knelt during the national anthem after he heard his teammates saying "nigger". After his protest, the player received racial threats. On September 9, high school players across the country knelt during the national anthem. On September 23, four players from Withrow High School, three black and one white, in Cincinnati knelt during the national anthem before their football game.

In September 2017, Principal Waylon Bates of Parkway High School in Louisiana referred to the national anthem protests as a "disruption" and threatened to kick any player out of the football team if he knelt during the national anthem. Two black students on the Victory & Praise Christian Academy football team protested during the anthem. Immediately after the anthem concluded, their coach removed them from the team, having them take off their uniforms on the sidelines.

In December 2017, Ninth Circuit Court for the Southern District of California ruled in favor of high school players, and stated that no high school football player can be forced to stand during the national anthem or cannot be forced out of the team by refusing to do so. The basis for this ruling is that "loss of First Amendment freedoms unquestionably constitutes irreparable harm and that the mandate issued by the district superintendent is a violation of the athlete's First Amendment rights."

In October 2018, the 32 players of the Christian Capital Academy football team as well as the coaching staff decided to take a knee during the national anthem. When asked about their reasons, the team collectively responded that they took a knee as a way to protest for the excessive use of police brutality against minorities, especially against African Americans. The two players did not receive any punishment for their protest.

=== Baseball ===
On September 23, 2017, Bruce Maxwell of the Oakland Athletics knelt during the national anthem, becoming the first MLB player to join the protest. His team backed him up by saying, "The Oakland A's pride ourselves on being inclusive. We respect and support all of our players' constitutional rights and freedom of expression." Maxwell received a standing ovation from A's fans before his first at-bat following his protest.

=== 2020 MLB preseason ===
On July 21, 2020, San Francisco Giants manager Gabe Kapler took a knee over anger of how the United States is handling police brutality. Right Fielder Jaylin Davis joined as well. Los Angeles Angels reliever Keynan Middleton knelt and raised his right fist during the national anthem on the same day.

The following day, Cincinnati Reds players Phillip Ervin, Joey Votto, Amir Garrett and Alex Blandino all knelt. The Giants also continued their protest with Pablo Sandoval, Hunter Pence and several others joining in.

=== 2020 MLB season ===
Prior to each game on opening day, players knelt in unison while holding a black rope. Patches reading "United for Change" and Black Lives Matter are also on the sleeves of every player's baseball uniform.

The New York Yankees and Washington Nationals both knelt during pregame demonstrations before standing during the anthem.

Mookie Betts was the lone member of the Los Angeles Dodgers to protest. Max Muncy and Cody Bellinger stood next to Betts with their hands on his shoulders. The same members of the San Francisco Giants that knelt during the preseason continued their protest.

Of the Giants, pitcher Sam Coonrod was the lone player that didn't kneel during pregame demonstrations. His reasoning was because of his faith and that he only feels that he can kneel for God. He also believes that the Black Lives Matter movement has Marxist roots and is against the nuclear family.

Players on both the Atlanta Braves and New York Mets wore shirts reading Black Lives Matter and "Love Your Neighbor" during pregame warmups. All players took part in pregame demonstrations before standing for the anthem.

Niko Goodrum, Cameron Maybin, Jeimer Candelario, Joe Jiménez and Dave Clark of the Detroit Tigers knelt during the national anthem prior to their game against the Cincinnati Reds. On the other side, Amir Garrett and Phillip Ervin continued to kneel. Garrett and Ervin are the only two African-American players on the Reds.

Vladimir Guerrero Jr., Cavan Biggio, Anthony Alford and Santiago Espinal of the Toronto Blue Jays knelt during the anthem prior to their game against the Tampa Bay Rays. Biggio explained that he did it to help other kneeling players who were afraid to do so. Ozzie Timmons and Rodney Linares of the Tampa Bay Rays both knelt as well. The Rays Twitter account had called for the arrest of the police officers involved in the shooting of Breonna Taylor prior to the first game.

Miami Marlins players wore Black Lives Matter shirts during warmups before their game against the Philadelphia Phillies. Both teams stood during both the pregame demonstration and national anthem.

Prior to their game against the Cleveland Indians, Kansas City Royals players wore Black Lives Matter shirts. During the national anthem, both teams stood with Indians players placing their left arms over each other's shoulders.

The Baltimore Orioles all walked onto the field wearing Black Lives Matter shirts. All of the Orioles stood while linking arms. On the other side, several members of the Boston Red Sox including Jackie Bradley Jr. and Alex Verdugo knelt.

Matt Kemp was the only member of the Colorado Rockies to kneel during the national anthem before their game against the Texas Rangers.

The Minnesota Twins plan to play both the Star-Spangled Banner and Lift Every Voice and Sing before their home games as well as a moment of silence at 8:46 pm during their home opener. Several Twins members knelt during the anthem before their game against the Chicago White Sox.

Six members of the Chicago White Sox knelt during the anthem.

Jarrod Dyson was the sole Pittsburgh Pirates player to kneel.

Tony Kemp and Khris Davis of the Oakland Athletics raised their right fists in the air but did not kneel.

Justin Upton, Brian Goodwin, Andrelton Simmons, Keynan Middleton and Noe Ramirez knelt during the anthem before playing the Oakland Athletics. Middleton also raised his fist while kneeling.

Seattle Mariners players Kyle Lewis, J. P. Crawford, Shed Long, Mallex Smith, Dee Gordon, and Justus Sheffield raised their right fists.

On July 25, 2020, New York Yankees players Giancarlo Stanton and Aaron Hicks both knelt during the anthem becoming the first Yankees players to do so. DJ LeMahieu tapped both players on the shoulder following the conclusion of the anthem in a show of solidarity.

=== WNBA ===
On September 24, 2017, prior to Game 1 of the 2017 WNBA Finals, players from the Los Angeles Sparks chose to stay in the locker room during the national anthem, while members of the Minnesota Lynx locked arms on the court.

Both the New York Liberty and Seattle Storm walked off the court during the Star-Spangled Banner during the 2020 season opener.

=== NBA ===
Players on the Milwaukee Bucks, Los Angeles Lakers, Toronto Raptors, Utah Jazz, Boston Celtics, Denver Nuggets, Miami Heat and Los Angeles Clippers planned to kneel during the anthem when the 2020 NBA Season resumed, despite the NBA not allowing it.

The NBA has a policy in their CBA that requires players to stand up during the national anthem, however many prominent players have expressed support for the NFL protests on social media or in interviews. However, in the wake of the George Floyd protests, NBA commissioner Adam Silver reversed his stance, stating that he respects "teams' unified act of peaceful protest for social justice and under these unique circumstances will not enforce [the] long-standing rule requiring standing during the playing of our national anthem."

Upon the resumption of the 2019–2020 season in the NBA Bubble, the entire ensemble of players, coaches, and referees in the first game knelt for an instrumental version of the National Anthem, which featured elements of rap music, pre-recorded by Jon Batiste. This marked the first time that all players, coaches, and referees knelt for an event in one of the Big Four leagues in the US. As games continue to be played, players, coaches, and referees continue to kneel.

Jonathan Isaac of the Orlando Magic has been one of the only NBA players to stand during the anthem, citing his faith as the reason why he did not kneel. San Antonio Spurs coaches Gregg Popovich, an "outspoken supporter of Black Lives Matter", and Becky Hammon also chose to stand for their own reasons.

Miami Heat player Meyers Leonard also chose to stand with his hand over his heart. His reasoning came down to his support for the military.

On February 10, 2021, Dallas Mavericks owner Mark Cuban announced that he would not play the national anthem at home games stating that it was "too divisive". The NBA later stepped in and forced him to retract his statement, reinforcing their policy that all teams are required to play the national anthem in the future. The same day, the Dallas Stars and the Texas Rangers affirmed that they would play the national anthem regardless of any backlash they would receive.

=== National Hockey League ===
On October 7, 2017, J. T. Brown of the Tampa Bay Lightning raised his fist while standing on the bench during the national anthem. He had also done the same in a preseason game, in an attempt to "bring awareness to police brutality against minorities and racial inequality". He stated that he had "received death threats" after the protest.

The Boston Bruins planned on linking arms during the playing of both the American and Canadian national anthems when the 2020 Stanley Cup Playoffs began.

Minnesota Wild player Matt Dumba became the first NHL employee to kneel during the Star-Spangled Banner. He eventually stood during the playing of O Canada. Dumba regrets not kneeling for both anthems and planned to raise his fist instead of kneel for the rest of the playoffs.

On August 3, 2020, Ryan Reaves and Robin Lehner of the Vegas Golden Knights and Tyler Seguin and Jason Dickinson of the Dallas Stars knelt during both the American and Canadian national anthems.

=== Pan American Games ===
At the 2019 Pan American Games in Lima, Peru, team fencing gold medalist Race Imboden knelt and women's hammer throw champion Gwen Berry raised a fist on the awards stand during the American national anthem.

Racism, gun control, mistreatment of immigrants, and a president who spreads hate are at the top of a long list. I chose to sacrifice my moment today at the top of the podium to call attention to issues that I believe need to be addressed. I encourage others to please use your platforms for empowerment and change.

— Race Imboden

It's too important to not say something. Something has to be said. If nothing is said, nothing will be done, and nothing will be fixed, and nothing will be changed.

— Gwen Berry

== Role of Russian bots in amplifying the outrage ==
A Clemson University research paper found that Russian bots played a role in amplifying the outrage over kneeling during the national anthem. Some 12,000 tweets linked to 491 accounts linked to Russia's Internet Research Agency were sent from the end of 2014 to mid-2018; those tweets peaked on September 22, 2017, after President Donald Trump's speech in Huntsville, Alabama.

U.S. Senator James Lankford of Oklahoma said Russian internet trolls, seeking to polarize Americans, helped fuel online discord. During a Senate hearing, Lankford said: "We watched, even this weekend, the Russians and their troll farms, their internet folks, start hashtagging out #TakeAKnee and also hashtagging out #BoycottNFL. They were taking both sides of the argument this weekend ... to try to raise the noise level of America and make a big issue seem like an even bigger issue as they are trying to push divisiveness in this country."

== Reactions ==
=== Political figures ===
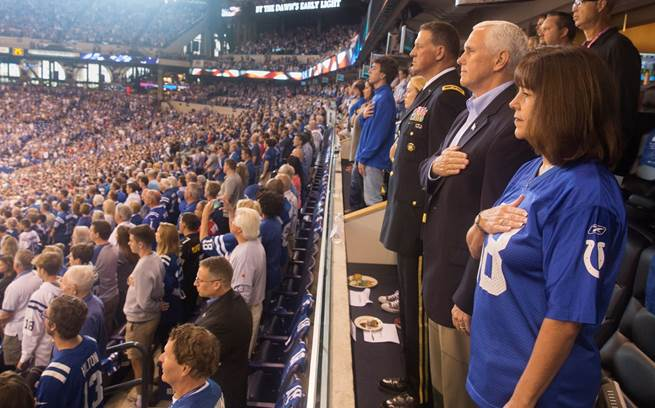
Vice President Pence stands for anthem prior to leaving after players knelt

In September 2016, President Barack Obama stated that Kaepernick was "exercising his constitutional right" to protest. He went on: "I don't doubt his sincerity. I think he cares about some real, legitimate issues that have to be talked about. If nothing else, he's generated more conversation about issues that have to be talked about."

Supreme Court Justice Ruth Bader Ginsburg criticized the protest as "dumb and disrespectful", stating that athletes have the right to protest "if they want to be stupid". The Supreme Court later issued a statement from Ginsburg stating that her comments were "inappropriately dismissive and harsh. I should have declined to respond."

On September 25, 2017, U.S. Representative Sheila Jackson Lee knelt on the floor of the House of Representatives. Fellow congressman Mark Pocan knelt on the floor of the House the next day.

On September 26, 2017, Louisiana Lt. Gov. Billy Nungesser told The Times-Picayune that he would not be attending the New Orleans Saints game against the Miami Dolphins, which was going to be taking place in London. Although he was going to be in London during the time of the game, he told the newspaper that he would not attend because he was "disappointed in the NFL". He added that "it is disgraceful that anybody would use that as a time to protest".

On October 8, 2017, Vice President Mike Pence left a game between the NFL's Indianapolis Colts and the San Francisco 49ers, members of which had knelt during the anthem, "because President Trump and I will not dignify any event that disrespects our soldiers, our flag, or our national anthem".

Oklahoma state representative Sean Roberts warned the Oklahoma City Thunder that if they kneel, he will reexamine their tax benefits.

"Taking a knee" became a wider social phenomenon beyond the sports field and outside of the United States, especially in the wake of actions related to the Black Lives Matter movement in 2020. Notably, the previous Canadian Prime Minister, Justin Trudeau, took a knee in this context in June 2020.

=== Corporations ===
Major sports sponsors Nike, Under Armour, and Ford all issued statements in support of athletes' freedom of expression after Trump's comments regarding the NFL. Nike's statement read, "Nike supports athletes and their right to freedom of expression on issues that are of great importance to our society." Nike's ad featuring Kaepernick read "Believe in something. Even if it means sacrificing everything." In September 2016, after Brandon Marshall knelt during the national anthem, Century Link and Air Academy Federal Credit Union dropped him as a paid sponsor. Radio station WFAY dropped a broadcast of an East Carolina University football game on the station after the marching band took part in the protest, calling it an insult to the U.S. Armed Forces. John Schnatter of sponsor Papa John's Pizza blamed the protests for a drop in sales and a 24% fall in stock during 2017, saying that the "controversy is polarizing the customer, polarizing the country". Later that day, the company announced that the NFL shield or "official sponsor" designation on Papa John's commercials and advertising would be removed. In December 2017 Sanderson Farms CEO questioned whether the NFL protests were to blame for falling chicken wing prices.

After his first kneel in 2016, Nike was well on its way to severing its four year long partnership with Kaepernick. Nigel Powell, chief communications executive of Nike, convinced the company to maintain their partnership with Kaepernick which eventually led to the launch of the politically and socially controversial advertisement released in 2018, "Nike - Dream Crazy", with Kaepernick as their face of their 30th anniversary campaign. Despite the prevalent backlash on social media of people who criticized Kaepernick's actions by burning and cutting up their Nike brand clothing, and even attracting the attention of President Trump, who then tweeted against the company's campaign, Nike sales increased by 31% within five days after the advertisement was released. However, the campaign did result in a temporary drop of 2.2% in the company's stock price. By September 13, 2018, Nike's stock price closed at $83.47 (~$105.00 in 2025), which at the time was the highest in the company's history. Nike took this backlash and converted it into a meme by releasing an ad that provided instructions to their customer on how to burn their products "properly".

=== Athletes and sports media ===
Throughout the remainder of the 2016 season, Kaepernick received public backlash for his protest, with an anonymous NFL executive calling Kaepernick "a traitor". On September 20, 2016, Kaepernick also stated that he received death threats primarily through social media.

Sportscaster Bob Costas offered support for Kaepernick stating, "Patriotism comes in many forms and what has happened is it's been conflated with a bumper-style kind of flag-waving and with the military only so that people cannot see that in his own way Colin Kaepernick, however imperfectly, is doing a patriotic thing."

Trent Dilfer criticized Kaepernick. "The big thing that hit me through all this was this is a backup quarterback whose job is to be quiet, and sit in the shadows and get the starter ready to play Week 1," Dilfer said on Sunday NFL Countdown. "Yet he chose a time where all of a sudden he became the center of attention. And it has disrupted that organization. It has caused friction. And it's torn at the fabric of the team."

Stemming from the Kaepernick controversy, before the beginning of the 2016 World Cup of Hockey tournament in Toronto, Canada, Team USA coach John Tortorella told in an interview that if any one of his players were to sit out during the anthem, they would sit on the bench for the entire duration of the game.

The September 2016 police shootings of Terence Crutcher and Keith Lamont Scott bolstered support for his protest. Kaepernick said of the Terence Crutcher shooting, "this is a perfect example of what this is about." Boxer Floyd Mayweather criticized Kaepernick, stating, "You know, a lot of times, we get stuck, and we are followers. When you hear one person say 'black lives matter' or 'blue lives matter,' all lives matter." Adding moments later, "With me being a fighter, and my hands being registered, if I hit a guy for breaking in my house, or breaking in my car, it's gonna cost me more money, so I gotta work smarter, not harder. I'm gonna call the cops."

Discussion continued throughout August 2017. Baseball Hall of Famer Hank Aaron said, "I think he's getting a raw deal" from the NFL. That same month, Pro Football Hall of Famer and longtime civil rights activist Jim Brown, who a year earlier supported Kaepernick "100 percent", now criticized him, suggesting Kaepernick ought to decide whether to be an athlete or an activist. "I'm an American," said Brown. "I don't desecrate my flag and my national anthem. ... This is my country, and I'll work out the problems, but I'll do it in an intelligent manner."

Jim Harbaugh, Kaepernick's former coach, penned a strong statement of support for him as part of Time's "100 Most Influential People" series. Harbaugh wrote, "His willingness to take a position at personal cost is now part of our American story. How lucky for us all and for our country to have among our citizens someone as remarkable as Colin Kaepernick."

NASCAR team owners Richard Petty and Richard Childress have supported Trump and said that they would fire drivers and employees who would not stand for the national anthem. Petty said, "Anybody that don't stand up for the anthem ought to be out of the country. Period." Childress said, "It'll get you a ride on a Greyhound bus" if anyone on his team protested the anthem. Driver Dale Earnhardt Jr., however, expressed support for the peaceful protests, quoting President John F. Kennedy, "Those who make peaceful revolution impossible will make violent revolution inevitable." NASCAR released a statement on September 25 in response to the protests that said, "Sports are a unifying influence in our society, bringing people of differing backgrounds and beliefs together. Our respect for the national anthem has always been a hallmark of our pre-race events. Thanks to the sacrifices of many, we live in a country of unparalleled freedoms and countless liberties, including the right to peacefully express one's opinion."

Jemele Hill tweeted, "Just so we're clear: the president's comments will only incite more player protests, not quell them." following Trump's initial response to the protests. Hill was later put on a two-week suspension for "a second violation of our social media guidelines", after Hill suggested people direct their disagreements towards advertisers of Dallas Cowboys owner Jerry Jones, after Jones stated he would bench any player who protested the national anthem on October 9, 2017.

On September 25, 2017, Bill Russell posted a photo to Twitter while kneeling and wearing his Presidential Medal of Freedom. On September 26, 2017, Joey Odoms, the national anthem singer for the home games of the Ravens, resigned citing the "tone/actions of a large number of NFL fans in the midst of our country's cultural crisis".

Former Chicago Bears coach Mike Ditka commented, "If you don't respect our country, then you shouldn't be in this country playing football ... So I would say, adios." He added that he was "not condemning anybody or criticizing anybody" in his remarks. According to Ditka, "there has been no oppression in the last 100 years that I know of."

On June 3, 2020, during the protests over the murder of George Floyd, Drew Brees told Yahoo Finance that he stood by his 2016 opinion that kneeling during the national anthem was disrespectful to the flag and to the US. Multiple of his teammates and other professional athletes expressed disappointment and anger at the statement. He apologized early the next day.

ESPN journalist Howard Bryant pointed out while many critics urged African-American athletes to leave politics out of sports, militaristic political displays and recruitment were broadly welcome, such as military fly-overs, camouflage versions of uniform merchandise, celebration of wounded veterans, expressions of support for law enforcement, and the national anthem. Bryant also criticized the impulse to silence or take away the citizenship of people speaking up against injustice.

=== Entertainment ===
NFL ratings have been in decline for the past couple years, except for the 2018 season, which saw an increase of 4%. However, during the 2016 and 2017 seasons ratings were down by 8% and 9.7% respectively. A UBS securities analysis show that the primary cause of the drop in the ratings from the NFL is mainly due to players protesting the national anthem. According to the same survey, 50% of the decline in rating in 2017 is because of players taking a knee before the game, whereas this action only accounts for 18% of the decline of rating in 2016. The decline in ratings also had an impact on the ad revenue from major television companies, especially CBS and Fox.

Stevie Wonder knelt during the 2017 Global Citizen Festival on September 23, saying "Tonight, I'm taking a knee for America".

Eddie Vedder, Pharrell Williams, Dave Matthews, John Legend and Roger Waters knelt to support the protests during concerts on September 24. The same day Sonequa Martin-Green posted in her Instagram account a picture of several members from Star Trek: Discovery's cast alongside producer Akiva Goldsman and herself kneeling. Shonda Rhimes posted a photo kneeling with the cast of Grey's Anatomy.

The X-Files actors Gillian Anderson and David Duchovny posted a photo on Twitter of themselves kneeling with arms locked on September 26.

Actor Damien Leake had been making a similar protest for almost 50 years, since the assassination of Martin Luther King Jr. When asked to comment:

Does it ever occur to you that the playing of the national anthem has no place at a sporting event, period? Those of you who know me from high school may remember that I decided to start sitting during the playing of the Star Spangled Banner on April 4th 1968, and have been sitting ever since.

=== Colleges ===
On October 11, 2018, Colin Kaepernick was awarded the W.E.B. Du Bois Medal at Harvard University during the Hutchins Center Honors sponsored by the Hutchins Center for African & African American Research. The award was given for his "significant contributions and African-American history and culture", and for his support "for intercultural understanding and human rights in an increasingly global and interconnected world". Some might think that the award is significant because it shows what he has sacrificed for starting and upholding the national anthem protest, and gives credibility to him as an activist based on the criteria for the award and past honorees such as Muhammad Ali.

=== Law enforcement ===
Due to Kaepernick's 2018 advertisement with Nike, both plaudits and denunciations have been voiced. On September 5, 2018, in response to the new Kaepernick-Nike campaign, the National Black Police Association provided a letter stating, "The NBPA believes that Mr. Kaepernick's stance is in direct alignment with what law enforcement stands for — the protection of a people, their human rights, their dignity, their safety and their rights as American citizens." Despite being police officers, the NBPA defends Kaepernick's actions because they feel that the issue of race must be addressed in order to tackle the ongoing issue.

There is a wide divide of agreement on this subject between law enforcement groups; especially between the NBPA and National Association of Police Organizations (who felt that Kaepernick's gestures regarding the national anthem were disrespectful). NAPO has even called for a boycott of Nike products due to their recent partnership with Kaepernick.

During the George Floyd protests, some police officers began kneeling to express solidarity with the protesters, in support of racial justice. On May 31, Lieutenant Robert Cattani knelt during the protests in Lower Manhattan's Foley Square. Cattani later apologized, on June 3, to his fellow officers for his "horrible decision", stating that he had not thought of the "consequence" of his action, which was not specified; that having knelt "goes against every principle and value that I stand for", and that his kneeling had ruined his "reputation as a good cop".

=== Social media ===
Kneeling during the national anthem became a symbol of resistance, similar to the black power fist. The act was discussed heavily on social media, with users on Twitter and Facebook using #TakeAKnee or #TakeTheKnee to discuss the act. The use of this hashtag exploded with 4 million tweets. The hashtag was often used with other hashtags such as #BoycottNFL and #BlackLivesMatter. #BoycottNFL is used in different states than #TakeAKnee, with those using #BoycottNFL wanting to boycott the NFL and those using #TakeAKnee supporting the players who choose to protest.

=== NFL national anthem policy ===
The previous national anthem policy by the NFL written about a decade before the new policy in May 2018 contained vocabulary that allotted more leeway in the players' behavior during the national anthem before games. It required players to be on the sideline but only stated that players should, not must, stand during the national anthem. Colin Kaepernick used this fact to an advantage and conducted his act of a peaceful protest which remained inconspicuous until President Trump posted his tweets on Twitter. The tweets brought enormous amounts of media attention to the participating players and found people on two sides of the issue; one group that supported Kaepernick and many other players that were protesting to bring awareness to the police brutality that black people faced and the other group that believed kneeling was disrespectful to the country, flag, or the military.

To address the backlash, the NFL released a national anthem policy in May 2018, stating that players and team personnel were required to stand during the national anthem. Those who chose not to stand were required to remain in the locker room. Though NFL commissioner Roger Goodell said the vote was unanimous among all NFL owners, Jed York, the owner of the San Francisco 49ers and Kaepernick's previous team said he abstained. During an interview, President Trump said that the NFL did "the right thing" of releasing the new policy. He added, "You have to stand proudly for the national anthem or you shouldn't be playing. You shouldn't be there. Maybe you shouldn't be in the country." In another interview, he applauded the new policy after its release, but felt that it was not strict enough.

Since passing the new national anthem policy in May 2018, the policy was put on hold in July 2018. This occurred when the NFLPA filed a grievance against the NFL's national anthem policy, stating that the policy violated the players' rights because there were no prior discussions between the NFL and NFLPA. The policy remained suspended until Super Bowl LIII and will remain suspended until further notice.

During the George Floyd protests on June 4, 2020, about 20 players released a video reciting the names of victims, demanding that the NFL condemn racism and admit its policy against peaceful protests were wrong and to affirm that black lives matter. Roger Goodell did so in a video message on June 5, and encouraged everyone to protest peacefully. On June 3, quarterback Drew Brees reiterated his opinion against the national anthem protests, generating considerable criticism, including from his teammates. Though he did not endorse the action of kneeling during the anthem, Brees apologized, prompting criticism of the apology from President Trump. Brees replied to Trump on Twitter that he has come to understand the protests were never about the American flag, and said it was wrong to use the flag to turn people away or distract people from issues facing African-Americans. In August, after the shooting of Jacob Blake, a black man, Goodell said that he wished the NFL had listened earlier to Kaepernick's reasons for kneeling.

== See also ==
- Show Racism the Red Card
- 2020 American athlete strikes
- 1968 Olympics Black Power salute
- United States Flag Code
- Quarterback kneel
