= Zach Hirsch =

American entrepreneur

Zachary McCall Hirsch
- Occupations: Entrepreneur, sports analyst, podcaster, content creator, producer and director
- Relatives: Scott Hirsch (Father)

Zachary McCall Hirsch is an American podcaster, sports analyst, content creator and entrepreneur. He is the co-founder of Mozverse Inc., an Emerging Technology and Web3 development company.

Hirsch hosts the sports podcast Double Coverage.

Hirsch is currently the co-host of Running It Back with Pac and Zach, a weekly NFL Predictions Show he co-hosts with former Cincinnati Bengals, All Pro Defensive Back, Adam "Pacman" Jones. He co-hosted Worldstar Hiphop's highest rated podcast, Kiss and the Myst, with American rapper Jadakiss, in which they discuss sports, culture, music, fashion and current events with variety of guests. He also cohosts The Fight Guys with American mixed martial artist "Suga" Rashad Evans, and Hirsch won the 2023 W3 Gold Award For Best Sports Podcast Episode for his interview with Floyd Mayweather on podcast in which they discuss the current state of both professional boxing and MMA.

== Early life and career ==
Hirsch grew up in Boca Raton and Delray Beach, Florida.

He co-founded Mozverse Inc., an emerging technology and Web3 focused company located in Miami, Florida with Danny Mozlin. Mozverse offers Web3 computing, infrastructure, storage and data intelligence services in addition to Metaverse and NFT development platforms and develops other emerging tech products.

In 2022, Mozverse was included in Inc. magazine's Best in Business list.

In 2020 Hirsch attended the MIT Sloan Sports Analytics Conference in Boston, Massachusetts, and then worked as a commentator, analyst, on-air handicapper and host on broadcasts for Triller, Impact Network, Bare Knuckle Fighting Championship, MarvNation and Celebrity Championship Boxing, and has contributed to SouthFloridaTribune.

Hirsch has written for Entrepreneur and contributed interviews to FightNews.com.

Hirsch made his debut as "the Myst", co-hosting the Kiss and the Myst podcast alongside American rapper Jadakiss on WorldStarHipHop. The show's first guest was NBA trainer Chris Brickley. Additional guests have included athletes Tyreek Hill, Brandon Marshall and Dustin Poirier, as well as rappers French Montana and Dave East. The episode featuring rapper French Montana is the most viewed Kiss and the Myst episode.

== Podcasting ==
On May 6, 2022 Hirsch made his debut as "the Myst" co-hosting the "Kiss and the Myst" podcast alongside American Rapper Jadakiss on WorldStarHipHop the show's first guest was famous NBA trainer Chris Brickley. The debut episode drew over 2 million views on WorldStarHipHop. Additional guests have included professional athletes including Tyreek Hill, Brandon Marshall, and Dustin Poirier as well as rappers such as French Montana and Dave East. The episode featuring rapper French Montana is the most viewed Kiss and the Myst episode thus far with over 2.65 million views to date. In 2023 he won the W3 Gold Award for Best Sports Podcast Episode for his interview of Floyd Mayweather on The Fight Guys. In 2023 Hirsch and Adam "Pacman" Jones debuted Running it Back with Pac and Zach podcast on YouTube and Spotify.

Hirsch hosts the sports podcast Double Coverage. In a 2026 interview with Inc., he described himself as the show's executive producer. In 2026, the podcast received a Gold Stevie Award in the Shows – Sports category at the American Business Awards.

== Filmmaking ==
In the leadup to Jake Paul's debut professional boxing main event on Triller PPV against opponent Ben Askren. Hirsch wrote, produced and directed a digital short film "Don't Sleep on Jake" documententing Paul's rising boxing career. Over 250 thousand people viewed the film across Social Media platforms Instagram and Youtube. On August 17, 2021 he wrote, produced and directed the fifth episode of WorldStarHipHops boxing documentary series "Beyond the Ring" titled "The Bounty" following heavyweight contender Michael Hunter in the buildup to and epilogue following Michael Hunters WBA's Continental Americas bout with Mike Wilson. Prior to the Verzuz event in Madison Square Garden's Hulu Theatre on August 3, 2021.

== Filmography ==
Television Broadcast

Impact Network Boxing 2019-2020 interviewer and color commentator

Bare Knuckle Championship Boxing 2020-2022 analyst and commentator

Triller Fight Club 2021 on-air oddsmaker

Celebrity Championship Boxing 2021-2022 host and commentator
