= Adam Jones (American football) =

American football player (born 1983)

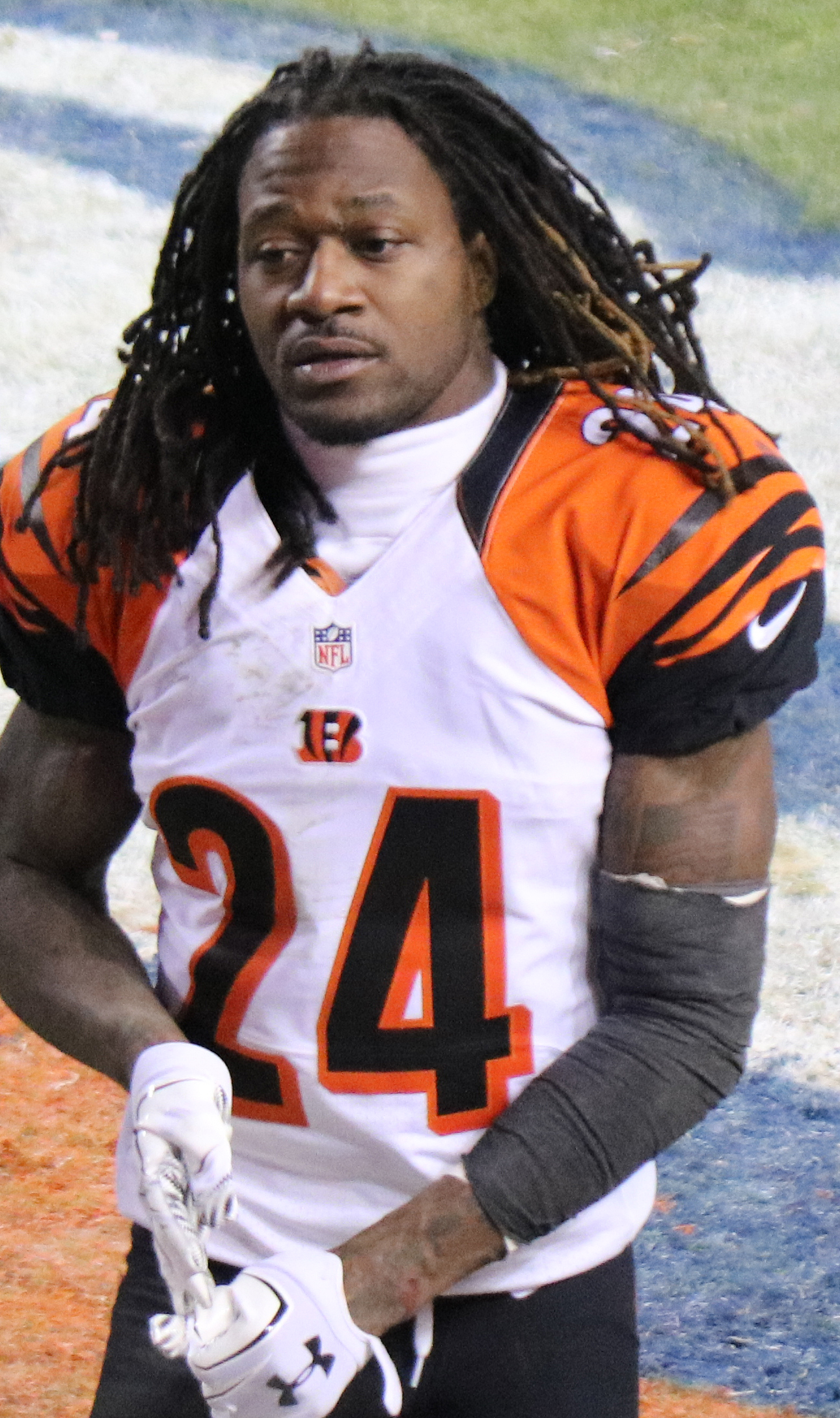
- Jones with the Cincinnati Bengals in 2015

No. 32, 21, 24
- Position: Cornerback

Personal information
- Born: September 30, 1983 (age 43); Atlanta, Georgia, U.S.
- Listed height: 5 ft 10 in (1.78 m)
- Listed weight: 185 lb (84 kg)

Career information
- High school: Westlake (Atlanta)
- College: West Virginia (2002–2004)
- NFL draft: 2005: 1st round, 6th overall pick

Career history
- Tennessee Titans (2005–2007); Dallas Cowboys (2008); Cincinnati Bengals (2010–2017); Denver Broncos (2018)

Awards and highlights
- First-team All-Pro (2014) (Note: Selected as a Return Specialist); Pro Bowl (2015); PFWA All-Rookie Team (2005); Big East Special Teams Player of the Year (2004); First-team All-Big East (2004); Second-team All-Big East (2003)

Career NFL statistics
- Total tackles: 507
- Interceptions: 17
- Pass deflections: 92
- Total return yards: 5,179
- Total touchdowns: 8
- Stats at Pro Football Reference

Adam Bernard Jones (born September 30, 1983) is an American former professional football player who was a cornerback and return specialist in the National Football League (NFL) for 13 seasons. Nicknamed "Pacman", he played college football for the West Virginia Mountaineers and was selected by the Tennessee Titans with the sixth overall pick in the 2005 NFL draft.

Jones' career was largely marred by numerous legal issues, and he was suspended from the NFL on two occasions: for the entire 2007 season and for part of the 2008 season due to off the field conduct. Jones has been arrested more times than any other NFL player in the 21st century. The Titans traded away Jones to the Dallas Cowboys in 2008 following his first suspension. After being released by the Cowboys after one season, Jones spent a year away from football before being acquired by the Cincinnati Bengals in 2010, where he spent the majority of his career at 8 seasons. With the Bengals, he was a First-Team All-Pro in 2014 and a Pro Bowl selection in 2015. After leaving the Bengals in 2017, he played in seven games for the Denver Broncos in 2018 before announcing his retirement in 2019.

Outside of football, he has been involved in professional wrestling, boxing and music. During his NFL exile in 2007, he began making appearances in Total Nonstop Action Wrestling (TNA), but he was prevented from in-ring action by the Titans front office. Despite that, he teamed with Ron Killings as Team Pacman, and they were TNA World Tag Team Champions for over a month. Also in 2007, Jones started up his own record label and was one half of the rap duo Posterboyz. After his retirement from football, Jones began training to be a boxer, but was defeated in his first amateur bout in 2021.

During 2023, he made numerous in-studio appearances for The Pat McAfee Show, before co-hosting Runnin' It Back w/ Pac + Zach on BetOnline.

== Early life ==
Jones was born in Atlanta, Georgia, and raised by his mother, Deborah Jones, and his grandmother, Christine Jones. His father was killed in a robbery in 1991 at the age of 26. Jones's mother gave him the nickname "Pacman" when he was a child, saying that he would change direction as fast as the video game character Pac-Man. His nickname was often used more than his given name, to the point where it was represented by a "P" on the back of his Titans jersey. As a child growing up in the Sandtown neighborhood of Atlanta, he was coached by longtime Sandtown coach Gary Jones. When Jones was a freshman at West Virginia University, his grandmother died of cancer. Jones only missed one game of his three-year college career, which was to attend her funeral. On the day of the NFL draft, Jones wore a T-shirt that featured his grandmother's picture.

Jones attended Westlake High School, in Atlanta, Georgia. In 2005, Westlake had the most alumni in the NFL with six players. Jones played in the Georgia-Florida all-star game, and was selected as the conference "Player of the Year" following his senior year after totaling 120 tackles, six interceptions and 1,850 rushing yards.

In addition to his accomplishments in football, Jones also earned All-American honors in basketball and track. His basketball team won two state championships.

== College career ==
Jones was an Athletic Coaching Education major and a member of the Athletic Director's Academic Honor Roll. As a freshman in 2002, Jones appeared in 11 games for West Virginia as a reserve cornerback and safety. He totaled one interception and one forced fumble with 36 tackles. During 2003, he appeared in all 13 games, starting nine at cornerback, and taking over full-time kick return and punt return duties. Jones's second season resulted in a second-team All-Big East Conference selection with his career-high 89 tackles and four interceptions, one being for a touchdown. He also had six tackles for losses, one forced fumble and two fumble recoveries. He also had a career-high 12 passes deflected that season. In a game against Boston College, Jones scored two touchdowns in a 35–28 win over the Eagles, one an 87-yard kick return and the other, a 47-yard interception return. Jones also had a career-high 12 tackles against Miami. Jones totaled 98 punt return yards on 16 punt returns and 867 kick return yards, including an 87-yard touchdown return.

As a junior in 2004, he was the secondary captain and led the team in tackles and interceptions. Jones also played briefly on offense, as well as returning punts and kicks for the second season. He was named first-team all-Big East as a defensive back and honorable mention All-American by several sources. He led the team with 76 tackles, adding two sacks, three interceptions, and seven passes defended. Jones was named to collegefootballnews.com's All-American first-team and was named honorable mention All-American at kick returner. Jones was also named Big East Special Teams Player of the Year. His 76-yard punt return against East Carolina was his longest return and only punt return for a touchdown in Jones's career. Jones ended his college career in the 2005 Gator Bowl, when he fumbled a kick return early in the game; the Mountaineers lost to Florida State.

Jones is ranked second on West Virginia's career kickoff return yardage list with 1,475 yards. He is ranked 11th on the school's career punt return yardage list with 404 yards, while his 10.92 yards per punt return is the sixth most in school history. Jones is one of the highest West Virginia players drafted. Jones and fellow-Mountaineer great Major Harris both wore the #9 while playing in college.

== Professional football career ==
Pre-draft measurables
Height	Weight	40-yard dash	Vertical jump	Bench press
5 ft 9 1/2 in (1.77 m)	187 lb (85 kg)	4.38 s	38.5 in (0.98 m)	9 reps
All values from NFL Combine/Pro Day

=== Tennessee Titans ===
After his junior year, Jones opted to forgo his senior year and declare himself eligible for the NFL draft. He was the first defensive player drafted, taken sixth overall by the Tennessee Titans in the 2005 NFL draft. He missed most of training camp, holding out in a contract dispute. According to Titans then-general manager Floyd Reese, the Titans were concerned over several off-the-field incidents. In a column for ESPN in 2007, Reese said that contract talks broke down when Jones balked at the Titans' proposed safeguards. However, he agreed that he would not be paid any guaranteed or bonus money if he were convicted of a crime.

During his rookie season, he had 44 tackles and 10 pass deflections. On special teams, Jones totaled 1,399 return yards and one touchdown. Jones and Reynaldo Hill were the only rookie duo to start at least 10 games each at cornerback in the NFL.

In Jones's sophomore season, he totaled career-high 62 tackles, one sack, one forced fumble, 12 deflected passes, four interceptions, 130 return yards, one interception touchdown, 14 passes defended (second-team), 440 punt return yards and tied for NFL-high with three punt return touchdowns. The three punt returns also tied the franchise record with Billy "White Shoes" Johnson, which was set in 1975. His 12.9 yards per punt return average led the NFL, edging out Chicago's Devin Hester by 1/10 of a yard, while his 26.1 yards per kick return average ranked seventh in the league and sixth in the AFC. Jones also caught two passes on offense for 31 yards (one for 17 yards) and rushed twice for eight yards. His best performance came against the Jacksonville Jaguars in week 15, when Jones had an 83-yard interception return for a score, a 70-yard kick return, and broke up a touchdown pass to Matt Jones to save the game. Jones broke out in his fifth game of the season against the Indianapolis Colts, when he recorded a season-high five tackles and defended a pass in the 14–13 loss. The next week against the Washington Redskins, Jones recorded four tackles and stripped the ball from Antwaan Randle El for the first forced fumble of his career. The next week against the Houston Texans, Jones tied a career-high tackle total with eight, and picked off a Sage Rosenfels pass for his first career interception, and also posted his second touchdown on a punt return in his career in the fourth quarter with a 53-yard return. Two weeks later, against the Philadelphia Eagles, Jones recorded his second punt return for a score of the season, a 90-yard run, breaking Billy Johnson's 87-yard franchise record. The next week against the New York Giants, Jones picked off an Eli Manning pass in the fourth quarter that sparked the Titans' 21-point comeback. Against the New England Patriots in the last game of the season, Jones totaled 259 return yards (the NFL's highest total since 2006) along with a punt return score.

Despite Jones's breakout second year, speculation was rife during the 2007 NFL draft that the Titans were seriously considering releasing or trading him due to his numerous off-the-field problems. Reese later recalled that he and other Titans front-office officials, as well as league officials, had spent "countless hours" trying to keep Jones out of trouble. Reese added that Jones had been everything the Titans had hoped for on the field, he'd been "nothing but a disaster off the field" during his two years in Nashville, and felt that he was on "a downward spiral."

On April 10, 2007, NFL commissioner Roger Goodell announced that Jones would be given a one-year suspension for violation of the NFL player conduct policy, to be re-evaluated after the 10th regular-season game, pending disposition of current cases, which Jones appealed. This was the first time in 44 years that a player was suspended for an offense other than substance abuse. Jones took out a full-page ad in The Tennessean, promising he would "win back trust" of his teammates and fans. "To my family, teammates, coaches and fans, I recognize that I have lost the right to ask for your patience and understanding," wrote Jones. "However, I will do everything in my power to regain your trust and respect." Jones also wrote in the letter that he planned to finish his degree at West Virginia University. "The basis of the appeal ... will be to clarify some of the facts and address the unprecedented punishment that was imposed," Jones wrote in the letter. However, on June 12, Jones withdrew his appeal.

During his suspension Jones signed with Total Nonstop Action Wrestling (TNA), despite an agreement between TNA and the Titans organization that he would only have a "non-physical" role in the company, and went on to win the TNA World Tag Team Championship with Ron Killings. He also established a record label, "National Street League Records", and performed as one half of the rap duo Posterboyz.

Ten weeks into the 2007 season, Goodell decided not to reduce Jones's suspension. Following this announcement, the NFL Players Association (NFLPA) said that it would appeal Jones's suspension. Tennessee running back LenDale White told The Tennessean that he thought all Titans players wanted Jones to return to the team. Quarterback Vince Young said, "We are going to do well without him, we can do well with him...". On December 13, 2007, the NFL agreed to hear the players union's appeal on Jones's behalf. The players union appealed Goodell's decision to not allow Jones to be reinstated during the 2007 season.

On February 1, 2008, ESPN reported that Goodell remained disappointed in Jones and that he would most likely not be reinstated after the Super Bowl. The NFL was to review Jones after the 2008 Pro Bowl. It was also reported that the Titans would try to trade Jones, if reinstated.

On March 8, 2008, Jones announced on a Tennessee radio station that he was in "tip-top shape" and said he was ready to be reinstated. His agent also announced that they would consider applying for reinstatement before the 2008 NFL draft. Jones also said on the radio show that he would like to play for the Dallas Cowboys if the Titans desired to trade him. Other teams that expressed interest in Jones were the Detroit Lions, Oakland Raiders, Kansas City Chiefs, Houston Texans and New Orleans Saints. On March 30, Jones participated at a charity basketball event, where he signed a football for a fan with the #21, saying that he believed he would wear the number if he ended up in Dallas with the Cowboys. NFL Network correspondent Adam Schefter had also described the Tennessee–Dallas trade for Jones as being "imminent". On April 1, Goodell said he would have a decision on reinstating Jones prior to training camp. However, the next day, reports said the trade was being delayed due to the Cowboys denying the Titans' request to provide a fourth-round pick and a pick in the 2009 NFL Draft. Also, the two teams disagreed over whether the Cowboys would reimburse the Titans for a bonus owed to Jones. On April 14, Schefter reported that trade talks had restarted, with the Cowboys offering a sixth-round pick and the Titans requesting a fourth-round pick in the 2008 draft.

=== Dallas Cowboys ===
On April 23, 2008, Jones was traded to the Dallas Cowboys in exchange for a fourth-round pick in the 2008 NFL Draft. As Jones was reinstated for the 2008 season, the Cowboys would give the Titans their sixth-round pick in 2009.

Jones also reached a financial settlement with the Titans regarding his contract: he agreed to pay US$500,000 to a charity chosen by the Titans in the next two years. Jones signed a four-year contract that included annual roster bonuses and was structured to protect Dallas if Jones made more off-field mistakes.

On April 24, Hall of Famer Jim Brown announced that he had offered his support and help to Jones while in Dallas. Former Cowboys players and NFL standouts Michael Irvin and Deion Sanders also expressed a willingness to help the troubled cornerback.

Beginning in June, Jones was cleared to participate in organized team activities with the Cowboys, including training camp and preseason games. On August 26, Jones was fully reinstated for the 2008 NFL season.

In the season opener for the Cowboys, a 28–10 victory against the Cleveland Browns, Jones recorded a tackle and a pass deflection. In the following 41–37 victory against the Philadelphia Eagles, Jones recorded four tackles and a pass deflection. In a 27–16 victory over the Green Bay Packers, Jones led the Cowboys with eight tackles and a fumble recovery.

In October 2008, Jones was suspended for at least four games for an altercation at a Dallas hotel. On November 19, 2008, Cowboys owner Jerry Jones said the suspended cornerback would be reinstated by commissioner Roger Goodell, but he would miss two more games, November 23 and 27, and would return to play December 7 at Pittsburgh. By the time of his return, Jones would be suspended from 22 of a possible 28 games.

Due to the suspension, the Titans gave their fifth-round pick to the Cowboys in 2009 and also returned the sixth-round pick to them, as stipulated in terms of the trade.

On December 7, 2008, against the Pittsburgh Steelers game, Jones suffered a neck injury, but continued to play. Later that week news reports indicated that the injury was more severe than first believed, and could be a season-ending or career-ending injury for Jones. On December 10, 2008, the Cowboys announced that Jones would probably be out for the rest of the season. However, he returned to play in the Cowboys' final game of the season, a 44–6 loss against the Philadelphia Eagles.

On January 7, 2009, the Cowboys announced they would release Jones. According to ESPN's Ed Werder, the move came after Cowboys officials learned that Jones was a suspect in a June 2007 shooting outside a strip club in Atlanta. Jones was alleged to have ordered the shooting after a dispute with one of the men. Due to NFL rules which bar major player transactions until after the Super Bowl, the Cowboys did not officially cut ties with Jones until February 9, 2009.

=== Winnipeg Blue Bombers ===
In August 2009, Jones agreed in principle to a one-year deal to play with the Winnipeg Blue Bombers of the Canadian Football League. The CFL season, which runs from July through November, was half over at the time.

However, on September 2, the Blue Bombers announced they were no longer interested in Jones after he made remarks in an internet video including calling the league the United Football League instead of the Canadian Football League. The startup UFL reportedly offered Jones a contract which he turned down.

=== Cincinnati Bengals ===
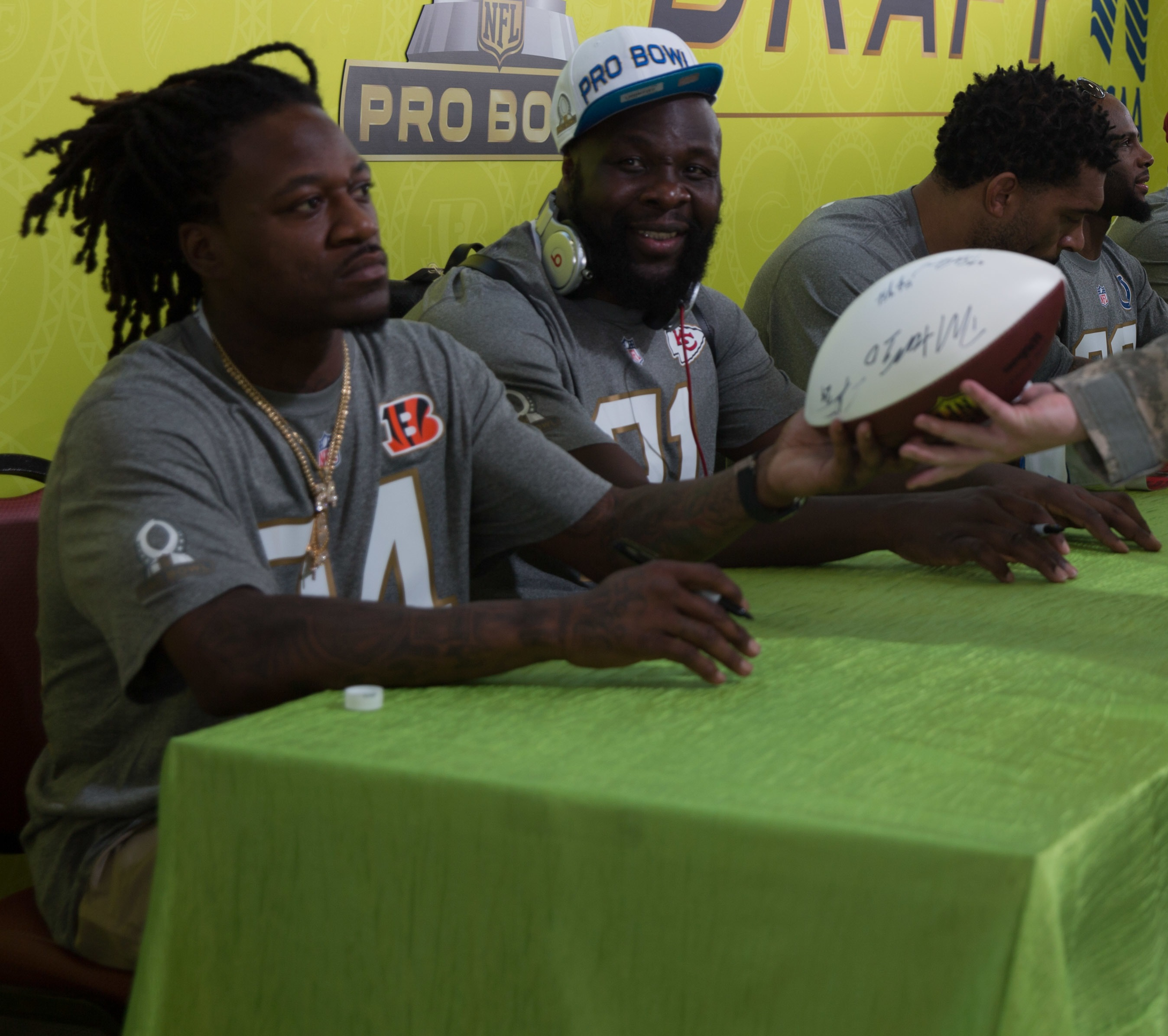
Jones (left) at the 2016 Pro Bowl.

Jones worked out with the Cincinnati Bengals on February 12, 2010, but the Bengals did not offer him a contract. Jones worked out for NFL scouts on March 19 in New Orleans, Louisiana. Six NFL teams were in attendance. At his workout, his 40-yard dash time was 4.42 seconds.

On May 10, 2010, Jones signed a two-year deal with the Bengals. He went through the off-season and preseason without incident and made the regular-season roster. He made his Bengals debut on September 12, 2010, as a kick returner and a backup cornerback. He returned two kickoffs for 37 yards and made two tackles and an assist on defense during the Bengals' 38–24 loss to the New England Patriots. On October 26, Jones sustained a serious neck injury, and missed the remainder of the 2010 season.

Jones returned to action with the Bengals on October 30, 2011, returning one punt for 63 yards. He suffered a hamstring injury and did not play for the rest of the game.

On March 21, 2013, Jones signed a three-year deal to remain with the Bengals.

In the final minute of the 2015 Wild Card Round against the Pittsburgh Steelers, Jones became involved in an altercation with Steelers assistant coach Joey Porter late in the fourth quarter and was penalized for unsportsmanlike conduct following an unnecessary roughness penalty against Vontaze Burfict. The Bengals were leading 16–15, but the back-to-back penalties drawn by Burfict and Jones moved the Steelers into field goal range and allowed them to win the game, 18–16. Jones was subsequently fined $28,940 for the altercation, which was reduced to $12,500 by the NFL after appeal. Porter would be fined $10,000 for his actions. The incident led to the creation of the "Joey Porter Rule", which prohibits assistant coaches from entering the field of play.

On March 9, 2016, Jones signed a three-year deal to remain with the Bengals.

Jones was suspended the first game of the 2017 season for violating the league's personal conduct policy. In Week 13, Jones suffered a groin injury while intercepting a pass by Ben Roethlisberger. He was placed on injured reserve on December 9, 2017.

On March 9, 2018, the Bengals announced they had declined the option in his contract for the 2018 season, making Jones a free agent.

=== Denver Broncos ===
On August 26, 2018, Jones signed with the Denver Broncos. He played in seven games before being released on November 20, 2018.

=== Retirement ===
On May 24, 2019, Jones announced his retirement.

== Professional wrestling career ==
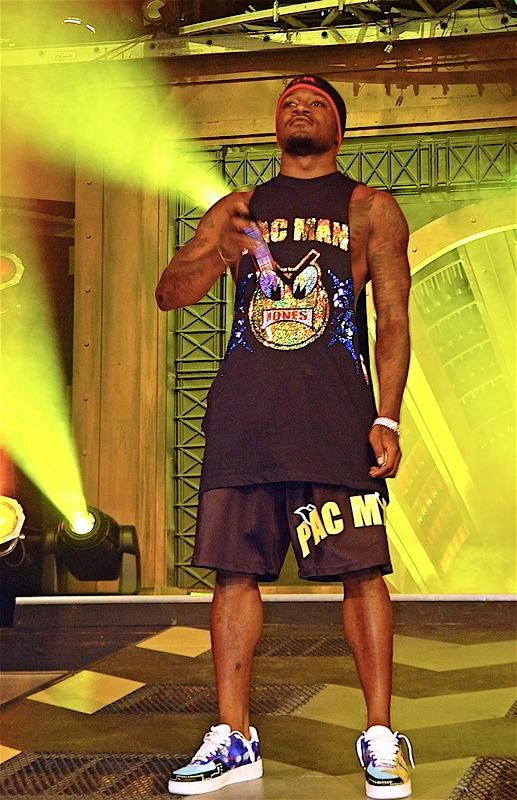
Jones in the Impact Zone

On August 6, 2007, Total Nonstop Action Wrestling (TNA) confirmed through their website that they had signed a deal with Jones. In interviews with TNA Vice President Jeff Jarrett, Jones indicated that he intended to wrestle, primarily as part of a tag team. In response, the Tennessee Titans organization were granted a restraining order barring him from working with the company at all, prompting the two companies to negotiate a compromise stating that Jones wouldn't be allowed to "touch or be touched, use or be hit by any object or anything else that could injure him", but he would be allowed to appear with the company in a non-physical role.

Jones made his first appearance at Hard Justice later that month, taking part in an interview with Mike Tenay explaining that he chose professional wrestling to prove that he could be "the ultimate team player", and TNA specifically because both he and it were "trend setters". They were interrupted, however, by Ron Killings who proceeded to run down and "threaten" Jones until Jones challenged him to enter the ring and fight, only to be kept separated by (kayfabe) security guards. In later backstage segments Jones was shown laid out and bleeding, then being taken away in an ambulance. At the next weeks Impact!, Jones challenged Killings, only to have him appear and profess respect for him—even suggesting forming a team to vie for the World Tag Team Championship. Accepting, the newly minted "Team Pacman" spent the lead up to No Surrender attacking wrestlers and spray painting "autographs" reading "PAC" on their backs. At the show, Team Pacman took the TNA World Tag Team Championship from the champions, Kurt Angle and Sting, with Jones making the actual pin, though he was not otherwise physically involved in the match—refusing to tag in at times and literally running away at others.

Going into Bound for Glory—held in his hometown of Atlanta—TNA announced that Jones purchased 1,500 tickets to the show with the intention of donating them to the Fulton County School District. They also heavily promoted his "in-ring" appearance for the first ever two hour episode of Impact! on October 4, both in television commercials and on their website, but his portion of Team Pacman's match against Team 3D (Brother Ray and Brother Devon) consisted of him mostly avoiding physical contact again—leapfrogging an attempted tackle and catching then throwing a football at Brother Ray, ducking a clothesline, and holding a downed opponents legs for a double team maneuver—before the Voodoo Kin Mafia (B.G. and Kip James) interfered and the match ended in a disqualification. At Bound for Glory, with Jones not being allowed to wrestle a full match, Rasheed Lucius "Consequences" Creed was brought in as a substitute for Jones for the title defense (under the "Freebird Rule") against A.J. Styles and Tomko, while Jones stood outside and watched. Jones attempted to interfere during the match by throwing cash at referee Earl Hebner, which inadvertently distracted Hebner long enough to miss a pin for Team Pacman and allow Styles and Tomko to win the match and the title.

After the loss, Jones all but disappeared from TNA television, with his contract expiring and being passed up for renewal on October 15. Jones would return to the promotion six years later, now known as Impact Wrestling, on the November 7, 2013, episode of Impact!, which was held in Cincinnati. Jones and Bengals practice squad member, defensive end DeQuin Evans, were sitting in the front row and got into an altercation with Bad Influence (Christopher Daniels and Kazarian), who pushed both players, leading them to jump the guardrail and bodyslam both wrestlers in the ring.

== NFL career statistics ==
Legend
**Bold**	Career high

Year	Team	Games		Tackles				Fumbles			Interceptions					
Year	Team	GP	GS	Cmb	Solo	Ast	Sck	FF	FR	Yds	Int	Yds	Avg	Lng	TD	PD
2005	TEN	15	13	53	44	9	0.0	0	0	0	0	0	0.0	0	0	10
2006	TEN	15	15	63	51	**12**	**1.0**	**1**	0	0	**4**	**130**	**32.5**	**83**	**1**	**12**
2007	TEN	0	0	Suspended												
2008	DAL	9	6	31	26	5	0.0	**1**	1	0	0	0	0.0	0	0	7
2010	CIN	5	1	14	11	3	0.0	**1**	**2**	**59**	1	10	10.0	10	0	3
2011	CIN	8	7	28	26	2	0.0	0	0	0	0	0	0.0	0	0	6
2012	CIN	16	5	40	33	7	**1.0**	**1**	0	0	0	0	0.0	0	0	9
2013	CIN	16	13	56	44	**12**	0.0	**1**	**2**	43	3	60	20.0	60	**1**	**12**
2014	CIN	16	3	63	51	**12**	0.0	0	1	0	3	23	7.7	12	0	11
2015	CIN	14	14	62	53	9	**1.0**	**1**	0	0	3	14	4.7	14	0	**12**
2016	CIN	16	16	**66**	**54**	**12**	0.0	**1**	1	0	1	2	2.0	2	0	7
2017	CIN	9	9	23	19	4	0.0	0	0	0	1	0	0.0	0	0	4
2018	DEN	7	2	0	0	0	0.0	0	0	0	1	0	0.0	0	0	3
Career		146	104	498	411	87	3.0	7	7	102	17	239	12.8	83	2	96

== Career highlights ==
NFL

- First-team All-Pro (2014) (Note: Selected as a Return Specialist)
- Pro Bowl (2015)
- PFWA All-Rookie Team (2005)

College

- Big East Special Teams Player of the Year (2004)
- First-team All-Big East (2004)
- Second-team All-Big East (2003)

Pro wrestling

- TNA World Tag Team Championship (1 time) with Ron Killings

== Legal issues ==
=== 2005–2006 ===
During the 2005 draft, Jones was on probation for a fight in West Virginia. He encountered more legal trouble before playing a down for the Titans. On July 14, 2005, Jones was arrested on charges of assault and felony vandalism stemming from a nightclub altercation in Nashville. On September 5, 2005, police were involved when Jones was belligerent after being told to wait in line for his vehicle at the annual Nashville Sports Council Kickoff luncheon where he was a guest. He refused to pay for valet services used that evening, claiming he had no cash in possession.

The state of West Virginia filed a petition, alleging that Jones had not made regular and sufficient contact with his probation officer or reported his July arrest in a timely fashion. The court ordered Jones's probation extended for 90 days.

In February 2006, Jones was arrested in Fayetteville, Georgia, after an incident outside a home. Charges of marijuana possession were quickly dismissed, but the state pressed charges for felony and misdemeanor counts of obstruction of justice.

A Cadillac with Jones's nickname "Pacman" stitched in the headrests was seized during an April 2006 cocaine bust. The car was not registered to Jones at that time, but Jones told a local TV reporter it was his car and that he had loaned it to Darryl Moore for a music video. Police sources confirmed that Moore was the main target of their investigation. Jones later bought the car at a police auction.

On August 25, 2006, during training camp, Jones was arrested in Murfreesboro, Tennessee, for disorderly conduct and public intoxication at a nightclub after he spat on a woman he accused of stealing his wallet. Police said that the staff at the nightclub ordered Jones to leave several times, but he refused, continuing to shout profanities at the woman. A judge gave Jones six months probation on the condition he stay out of trouble and away from the nightclub. On October 26, 2006, Jones was cited for misdemeanor assault for allegedly spitting in the face of a female Tennessee State University student during a private party at Club Mystic, a Nashville nightclub. He was suspended by the Titans for one game.

=== Las Vegas shooting case and suspension ===
On the morning of February 19, 2007, during the 2007 NBA All-Star Game weekend in Las Vegas, Jones was allegedly involved in an altercation with an exotic dancer at Minxx, a local strip club. Jones and American rap artist Nelly, along with another patron known as Richard Rich, showered the stage with hundreds of $1 bills. Club promoter Chris Mitchell then directed his dancers to pick up the money. According to the club's co-owner, Jones became enraged when a dancer began taking the money without his permission. He allegedly grabbed her by her hair and slammed her head on the stage. A security guard intervened and scuffled with members of Jones's entourage. Jones then allegedly threatened the guard's life. During this time, Mitchell and a male associate left the club with a garbage bag filled with $81,020 in cash and two Breitling watches, which police later recovered. After club patrons left following the original confrontation, the club owner claimed that a person in Jones's entourage returned with a gun and fired into a crowd, damaging equipment and striking three people, including a security guard. The guard was shot twice, and one of the people hit—former professional wrestler Tommy Urbanski—was paralyzed from the waist down. Jones maintained that he did not know the shooter, although the club's owner insisted that Jones did. On March 26, 2007, the Las Vegas Metropolitan Police Department recommended to the city's district attorney that Jones would be charged with one count of felony coercion, one misdemeanor count of battery and one misdemeanor count of threat to life.

More trouble followed Jones after the altercation, when drug dealer Darryl Moore was arrested. Wiretapped phone conversations between Moore and his friends revealed Moore talking about how Jones bet on college games to earn quick money. "You know, I was talking to him the other day about smoking, and he was like 'man, if I didn't smoke I couldn't take all the stress that I'm dealing with right now,'" Moore said.

On June 20, 2007, the Las Vegas Metropolitan Police Department and Clark County District Attorney's office announced that Jones would face two felony charges stemming from the February strip club melee. On November 13, 2007, Jones accepted a plea deal, and on December 6 Jones pleaded no contest to one charge of conspiracy to commit disorderly conduct, a misdemeanor. He was given a suspended prison sentence of one year, probation, and ordered to undergo 200 hours of community service.

On June 25, 2007, Tommy Urbanski and his wife, Kathy, sued Jones in civil court, claiming that Jones had bitten his left ankle and was responsible for the shooting. The lawsuit also named the Tennessee Titans and the NFL as defendants, on the grounds that Jones's employers knew of his erratic behavior prior to the Minxx incident, but did not suspend him until afterward. Had the Titans suspended Jones prior to the NBA All-Star game, the suit still debated, and Jones would not have been invited to the Las Vegas events, and the incident would not have taken place.

On April 21, 2008, a document revealed that Jones, through intermediaries, paid $15,000 extortion money in two installments to Arvin Kenti Edwards, the alleged Minxx club shooter.

On January 15, 2012, a jury ordered Jones to pay $11.6 million to Urbanski and Aaron Cudworth, a bouncer who was wounded, for Jones's role in the 2007 Las Vegas shooting. Jones's attorney said he planned to appeal the verdict.

On January 9, 2015, the Nevada Supreme Court upheld the order for Jones to pay $11 million to Urbanski and $1.3 million to Cudworth.

=== 2007–present ===
On May 7, 2007, Jones was stopped at 12:45 a.m. on Interstate 65 heading into downtown Nashville after an officer clocked him on radar at 79 miles per hour in a 55 miles per hour zone. Jones was driving the red 2004 Cadillac XLR Roadster which had been seized in the April 2006 cocaine bust, and which he had bought back from the police at auction.

On June 18, 2007, Jones was sought by police for questioning after a shooting at an Atlanta strip club allegedly involving members of his entourage. According to police at the scene, Jones was not present during the shooting, and was not being charged.

On August 13, 2007, regarding the February Las Vegas strip club incident, Jones told Bryant Gumbel of HBO Sports' Real Sports with Bryant Gumbel he was innocent and had never hit the stripper or told anyone he was going to kill them. When asked about friend and convicted drug dealer Darryl Moore, Jones said that he did not know Moore was a drug dealer and felt surprised and betrayed. Jones also said he did not think he got a fair say in his April meeting with NFL commissioner Roger Goodell.

On January 15, 2008, Jones was accused of hitting a woman in a strip club in Atlanta, Georgia on the morning of January 3. The woman, Wanda S. Jackson, was seeking an arrest warrant.

On June 21, 2008, the Associated Press reported Jones's $1.5 million home was in foreclosure. The home and 30 acres (12 ha), located in a Nashville suburb, was sold June 27 on the steps of the Williamson County Courthouse. Soon after, Jones decided he only wanted to be known as "Adam Jones" or "Mr. Jones," in an attempt to separate himself from his troubled past.

On October 8, 2008, Jones was involved in an altercation with his bodyguard in a Dallas hotel. Although there was no police report, nor was anyone arrested or charged, Jones was suspended for a minimum of four games by the NFL for violating the league's personal conduct policy. On October 16, Jones entered an alcohol rehabilitation center.

In a letter to Jones, Goodell called the Dallas incident the continuation of "a disturbing pattern of behavior and clearly inconsistent with the conditions I set for your continued participation in the NFL."

On January 3, 2017, Jones was arrested in Cincinnati's central district for obstructing official business, disorderly conduct, assault, and a felony charge of harassment with a bodily substance. On May 15, 2017, Jones accepted a plea agreement, pleading guilty to one count of obstructing a police officer. He received credit for time served (two days). Jones received a one-game suspension from the NFL on July 21, 2017, regarding the incident.

On July 10, 2018, Jones was attacked by an Atlanta airport employee, who was later arrested for assault. In February 2019, Jones was arrested for illegal bets in a casino, at a blackjack table. Footage of the incident was broadcast by TMZ and is currently available on YouTube. On February 15, 2021, Jones was arrested in Hamilton County, Ohio, for misdemeanor assault.

On September 11, 2023, Jones was arrested after police responded to a report of an unruly passenger at Cincinnati/Northern Kentucky International Airport. Jones was booked on misdemeanor counts of alcohol intoxication, disorderly conduct and terroristic threatening. He was later released.

On November 15, 2024, Jones was arrested at AT&T Stadium in Arlington, Texas and booked into Tarrant County Jail on multiple charges after getting into a fight at the stadium's bar area following the Jake Paul vs Mike Tyson bout. Jones was charged with one count of assault on a peace officer, one count of public intoxication, one count of evading and one count of resisting arrest.

On June 7, 2025, Jones was arrested near Cincinnati and charged with public intoxication, disorderly conduct, and assault of an officer. He was booked into the Kenton County Jail in northern Kentucky shortly before 2 a.m. and released later that day on a $100,000 bond. A court appearance was scheduled for the following Monday.

== Personal life ==
On July 5, 2014, Jones married Tishana Holmes. The couple have three children together.

Following the death of his long time college and NFL friend Chris Henry, Sr., Jones adopted his children (Chris, Seini, and Demarcus), vowing to raise them as Henry would have wanted to. Chris (football) and Seini (basketball) are both at Ohio State, and Demarcus is actively being recruited as a top basketball player.

== See also ==
- National Football League player conduct controversy
