= Brandon Marshall (linebacker) =

American football player (born 1989)

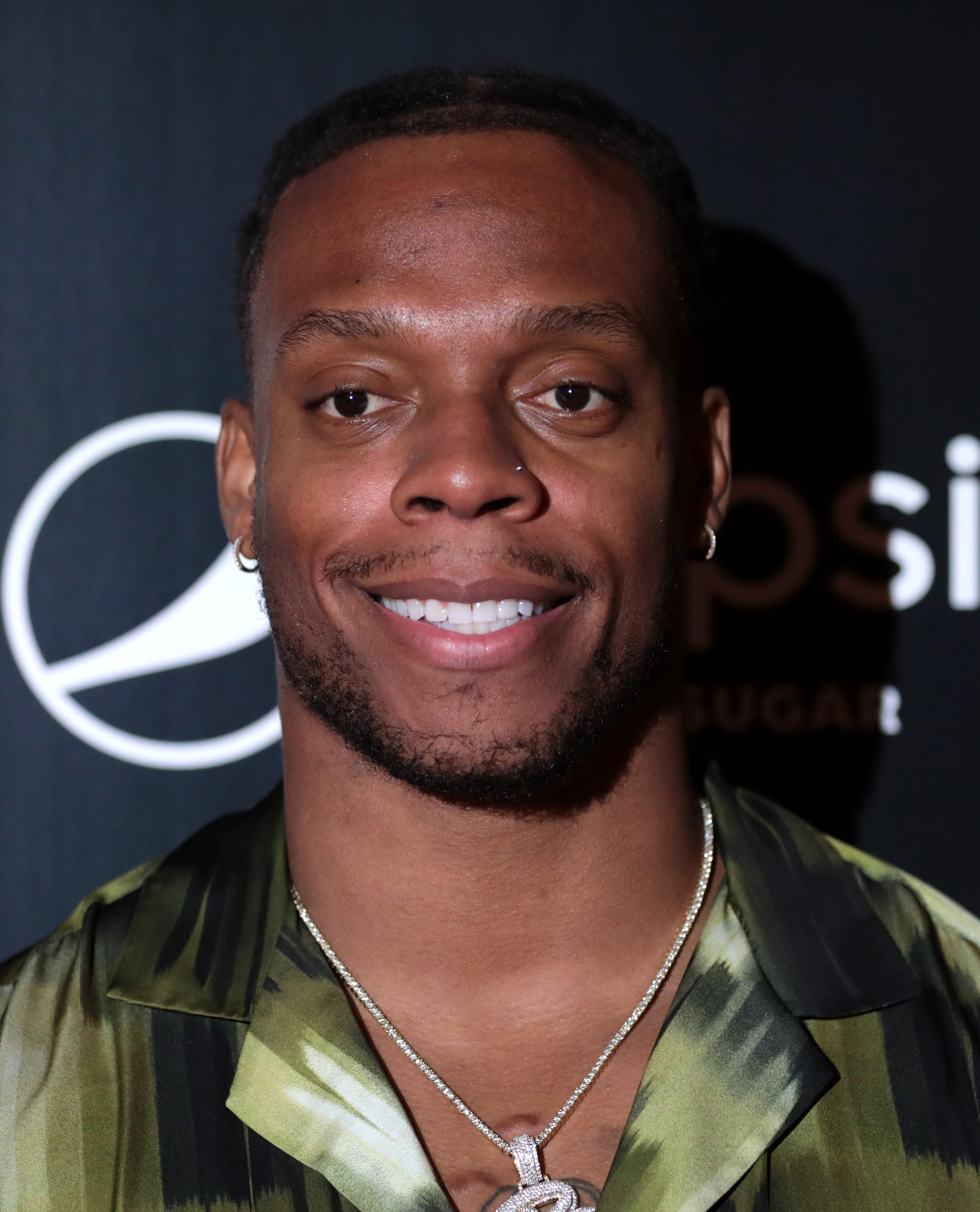
- Marshall in 2023

No. 53, 54
- Position: Linebacker

Personal information
- Born: September 10, 1989 (age 37); Las Vegas, Nevada, U.S.
- Listed height: 6 ft 1 in (1.85 m)
- Listed weight: 245 lb (111 kg)

Career information
- High school: Cimarron-Memorial (Las Vegas)
- College: Nevada (2007–2011)
- NFL draft: 2012: 5th round, 142nd overall pick

Career history
- Jacksonville Jaguars (2012); Denver Broncos (2013–2018); Oakland Raiders (2019)

Awards and highlights
- Super Bowl champion (50)

Career NFL statistics
- Total tackles: 418
- Sacks: 6.5
- Forced fumbles: 5
- Fumble recoveries: 1
- Interceptions: 2
- Defensive touchdowns: 1
- Stats at Pro Football Reference

Brandon Markeith Marshall (born September 10, 1989) is an American former professional football player who was a linebacker in the National Football League (NFL). He played college football for the Nevada Wolf Pack and was selected by the Jacksonville Jaguars in the fifth round of the 2012 NFL draft.

== Early life ==
Born and raised in Las Vegas, Nevada, Marshall attended its Cimarron-Memorial High School, where he played football and was also a member of the track & field team. In football, he was named a first-team All-Sunset Conference as a linebacker and tight end. Marshall was named second-team all-state as a linebacker, and was also a two-time all-league on offensive and defense. For his career, on defense, he recorded 68 tackles, 13 sacks, 57 quarterback hurries, four fumble recoveries and one interception. On offense, Marshall recorded 10 touchdowns, while recording 691 yards as a running back and 95 receiving yards as a tight end.

In 2016, Cimarron-Memorial High School retired Marshall's high school jersey on May 13.

== College career ==
Marshall attended the University of Nevada, Reno, where he majored in criminal justice. He redshirted as a freshman in 2007, and played in every game in 2008, starting six. For the season, he recorded 33 tackles, 8.5 tackles-for-loss, two sacks, one interception, and two pass break-ups. In 2009, he started every game at outside linebacker, ranked third on the team with 61 tackles and fourth with 9.5 tackles-for-loss. Marshall also recorded one sack one forced fumble, one fumble recovery and four pass break-ups. For the season he was named second-team All-WAC by Phil Steele and was named fourth team. In 2010, Marshall started all 13 games and the Kraft Fight Hunger Bowl. For the season, he finished sixth on the team with 63 tackles. He also recorded eight tackles-for-loss, one sack and two interceptions.

== Professional career ==
Pre-draft measurables
Height	Weight	Arm length	Hand span	40-yard dash	10-yard split	20-yard split	20-yard shuttle	Three-cone drill	Vertical jump	Broad jump	Bench press
6 ft 1 3/8 in (1.86 m)	242 lb (110 kg)	33 3/4 in (0.86 m)	10 3/8 in (0.26 m)	4.81 s	1.71 s	2.82 s	4.09 s	7.05 s	30 1/2 in (0.77 m)	9 ft 0 in (2.74 m)	28 reps
All values from NFL Combine.

=== Jacksonville Jaguars ===
==== 2012 ====
The Jacksonville Jaguars selected Marshall in the fifth round (142nd overall) of the 2012 NFL draft. He was the 19th linebacker drafted in 2012.

On June 5, 2012, the Jaguars signed Marshall to a four-year, $2.30 million contract that includes a signing bonus of $100,986.

Throughout training camp, he competed to be a backup linebacker against Kyle Bosworth and Russell Allen. Head coach Mike Mularkey named Marshall the backup left outside linebacker, behind Daryl Smith, to begin the regular season.

He made his professional regular season debut in the Jaguars' season-opener at the Minnesota Vikings and made one solo tackle in their 26–23 loss. Marshall made his first career tackle on a 28-yard kick return by wide receiver Percy Harvin in the first quarter. On October 27, 2012, the Jaguars released Marshall, but re-signed him three days later. On November 1, 2012, Marshall was released by the Jaguars, but was re-signed to the team's practice squad on November 5, 2012. On December 18, 2012, Marshall was promoted to the active roster. He finished his rookie season in 2012 with two combined tackles (one solo) in five games and zero starts.

On January 10, 2013, the Jaguars fired head coach Mike Mularkey after they finished with a 2–14 record in 2012. Throughout training camp, he competed to be a starting outside linebacker against Geno Hayes, J. T. Thomas, Kyle Knox, and LaRoy Reynolds. On August 30, 2013, the Jaguars released Marshall as part of their roster cuts.

=== Denver Broncos ===
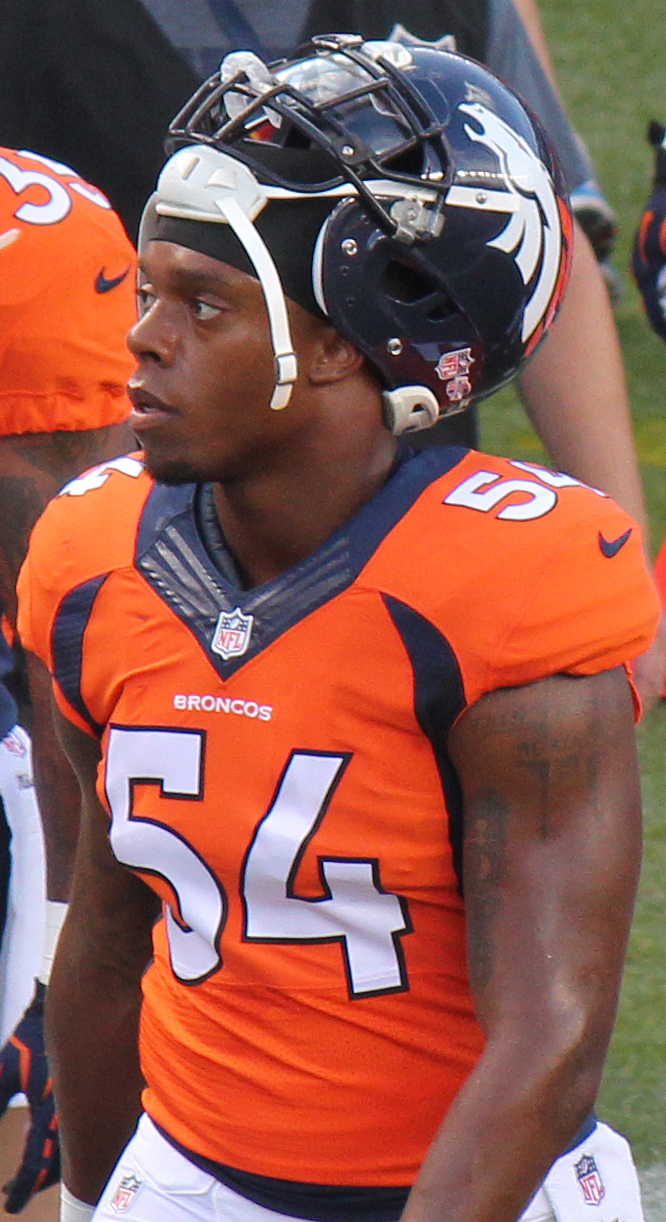
Marshall with the Denver Broncos in 2014

==== 2013 ====
On September 2, 2013, the Denver Broncos signed Marshall to their practice squad. On December 24, 2013, Marshall was promoted to the 53-man active roster after the Broncos placed Von Miller on injured reserve. Upon joining the active roster, head coach John Fox named Marshall the backup strongside linebacker behind Nate Irving. On December 29, 2013, Marshall made his Broncos debut and made two solo tackles during a 34–14 victory at the Oakland Raiders in Week 17. He finished the regular season with two solo tackles in one game.

The Broncos finished first in the AFC West with a 13–3 record, clinching a playoff berth and a first round bye. On January 12, 2014, Marshall appeared in his first career playoff game as the Broncos' defeated the San Diego Chargers 24–17 in the AFC Divisional Round. The Broncos reached the Super Bowl after defeating the New England Patriots 26–16 in the AFC Championship Game. On February 2, 2014, Marshall appeared in Super Bowl XLVIII and recorded one solo tackle as the Broncos lost 43–8 to the Seattle Seahawks.

==== 2014 ====
Throughout training camp, Marshall competed to be a starting outside linebacker against Steven Johnson, Lamin Barrow, Corey Nelson and Shaquil Barrett. Head coach John Fox named Marshall the starting weakside linebacker to start the regular season after Danny Trevathan sustained a fractured tibia during their first preseason game against the Seahawks.

He made his first career start in the Broncos' season-opener against the Indianapolis Colts and recorded nine combined tackles (seven solo) and a pass deflection in their 31–24 win. The following week, Marshall recorded eight combined tackles, deflected a pass, forced a fumble, and made his first career sack during a 24–17 victory against the Kansas City Chiefs in Week 2. Marshall sacked quarterback Alex Smith for a five-yard loss in the fourth quarter and forced a fumble by running back Knile Davis. On November 16, 2014, he collected a season-high 15 combined tackles (13 solo) in the Broncos' 22–7 loss at the Rams. In Week 14, Marshall recorded nine solo tackles, a season-high three pass deflections, and made his first career interception in the Broncos' 24–17 win against the Buffalo Bills. Marshall intercepted a pass attempt by quarterback Kyle Orton, that was intended for tight end Scott Chandler, in the third quarter. Marshall sustained a lisfranc fracture to his foot during a Week 15 victory at the Chargers and was inactive for the last two games of the regular season (Weeks 16–17). He finished the 2014 season with a career-high 113 combined tackles (91 solo), nine combined tackles, two sacks, a forced fumble, and an interception in 14 games and 13 starts. His 113 combined tackles led the team.

The Broncos finished first in the AFC West with a 12–4 record and earned a first round bye. On January 11, 2015, Marshall started in his first career playoff game and made six combined tackles in their 24–13 loss to the Colts in the AFC Divisional Round.

==== 2015 ====
On January 12, 2015, head coach John Fox and the Broncos agreed to mutually part ways. On January 28, 2015, the Broncos hired Wade Phillips as their new defensive coordinator after Jack Del Rio accepted the head coaching position with the Raiders. Marshall was moved to inside linebacker after the base defense was changed from a 4–3 defense to a base 3–4 defense. Marshall entered training camp slated as a starting inside linebacker. Head coach Gary Kubiak officially named Marshall and Danny Trevathan the starting inside linebackers to start the regular season, alongside outside linebackers DeMarcus Ware and Von Miller.

He started in the Broncos' season-opener against the Baltimore Ravens and recorded seven combined tackles, deflected a pass, and sacked quarterback Joe Flacco in their 19–13 victory. In Week 3, he collected a season-high 12 combined tackles (11 solo) during a 24–12 victory at the Detroit Lions. On December 20, 2015, Marshall recorded seven combined tackles, a pass deflection, and an interception during a 34–27 loss at the Pittsburgh Steelers in Week 15. Marshall intercepted a pass by quarterback Ben Roethlisberger, that was intended for running back DeAngelo Williams, in the fourth quarter with the Broncos losing 34–27 with two minutes remaining. Unfortunately, the Broncos' offense were unable to capitalize and lost after going four and out. Marshall started all 16 games and made 102 combined tackles (77 solo), four pass deflections, two forced fumbles, 1.5 sacks, and an interception. He also finished second on the team in tackles.

The Broncos finished first in the AFC West with a 12–4 record and clinched a first round bye and home-field advantage. They reached the Super Bowl after defeating the Steelers 23–16 in the AFC Divisional Round and the Patriots 20–18 in the AFC Championship Game. On February 7, 2016, Marshall started in Super Bowl 50 and made five combined tackles as the Broncos defeated the Carolina Panthers 24–10.

==== 2016 ====
On June 14, 2016, the Broncos signed Marshall to a four-year, $32 million contract extension with $20 million guaranteed and a signing bonus of $10 million.

On September 8, 2016, Marshall became the third NFL player to join in protest of American police brutality and racism by kneeling during the national anthem before the season opener against the Panthers. As a result, on September 10, Air Academy Federal Credit Union dropped an advertising endorsement deal with Marshall. On September 14, 2016, in a Super Bowl 50 rematch in the 2016 regular season opener, Marshall was fined $24,309 for a helmet-to-helmet hit on Panthers' quarterback Cam Newton.

==== 2017 ====
In 2017, Marshall started all 16 games, recording a team-leading 106 combined tackles, a career-high three sacks, four passes defensed and a forced fumble.

==== 2018 ====
In 2018, Marshall played in 11 games with seven starts, recording 42 combined tackles.

On February 15, 2019, the Broncos declined the option on Marshall's contract, making him a free agent at the start of the new league year.

=== Oakland Raiders ===
On March 28, 2019, Marshall signed a one-year contract with the Raiders. He was released during final roster cuts on August 30. On October 29, the Raiders re-signed Marshall, but he was released six days later.

== NFL career statistics ==
Legend
	Won the Super Bowl
**Bold**	Career high

Year	Team	Games		Tackles				Interceptions				Fumbles			
Year	Team	GP	GS	Cmb	Solo	Ast	Sck	Int	Yds	TD	PD	FF	FR	Yds	TD
2012	JAX	5	0	2	1	1	0.0	0	0	0	0	0	0	0	0
2013	DEN	1	0	2	2	0	0.0	0	0	0	0	0	0	0	0
2014	DEN	14	13	**113**	**91**	22	2.0	**1**	0	0	**9**	1	0	0	0
2015	DEN	16	16	102	77	25	1.5	**1**	0	0	4	**2**	0	0	0
2016	DEN	11	11	52	39	13	0.0	0	0	0	3	0	0	0	0
2017	DEN	16	16	106	75	**31**	**3.0**	0	0	0	4	1	**1**	**19**	**1**
2018	DEN	11	7	42	22	20	0.0	0	0	0	1	0	0	0	0
2019	OAK	0	0	DNP											
Career		74	63	419	307	112	6.5	2	0	0	21	4	1	19	1

== Personal life ==
Marshall is the son of Barbara Marshall. He has an older sister, Sandra, and an older brother, Marcus. In 2024, Brandon opened a restaurant in Las Vegas, NV called Hattie Marie’s. The menu consists of BBQ and Southern cuisine.
