= Air Academy Federal Credit Union =

Air Academy Credit Union
- Company type: Credit Union
- Industry: Financial services
- Founded: 1955
- Headquarters: Colorado Springs
- Area served: Colorado
- Key people: Glenn Strebe, CEO
- Products: Savings Accounts, Checking Accounts, Mortgage Loans, Car Loans, and Online Banking.
- Total assets: $800M
- Number of employees: 150
- Website: [https://www.aacu.com/

Air Academy Credit Union is a credit union in Colorado, United States. AACU provides comprehensive financial products and services, and online financial management systems. AACU has eight branch locations. It has over $800 million US in assets and over 49,000 members worldwide.

== History ==
Chartered in October 1955, Air Academy Credit Union (AACU) was originally created to serve the cadets, officers, and civilians of the newly established United States Air Force Academy at Lowry Air Force Base. As the Air Force Academy grew and evolved, so did its membership. Today, they not only serve all active and retired military service members and their families, but they also serve employees, students and families of 10 school districts and hundreds of local businesses (also called select employee groups (SEGs)) and their family members.

AACU is a federally chartered, not-for-profit, and member-owned financial institution. AACU is regulated by the National Credit Union Administration, a federal agency. Deposits at AACU are insured to at least $250,000 per account and are backed by the full faith and credit of the United States Government.

== Field of membership ==
In addition to serving all active and retired United States military members, AACU's field of membership includes the employees, students, and families in the following school districts:

- Academy School District 20
- Cheyenne Mountain School District 12
- Colorado Springs School District 11
- Douglas County School District RE-1
- Elbert School District 200
- Elizabeth School District C-1
- Fountain-Ft. Carson School District 8
- Kiowa School District C-2
- Lewis-Palmer School District 38
- School District 49

AACU also serves hundreds of select employee groups and local businesses in the state of Colorado.
