= 2013 Denver Broncos season =

American football team season

- Owner: Pat Bowlen
- General manager: John Elway
- Head coach: John Fox; Jack Del Rio (interim, weeks 10–13)
- Offensive coordinator: Adam Gase
- Defensive coordinator: Jack Del Rio
- Home stadium: Sports Authority Field at Mile High

Results
- Record: 13–3
- Division place: 1st AFC West
- Playoffs: Won Divisional Playoffs (vs. Chargers) 24–17; Won AFC Championship (vs. Patriots) 26–16; Lost Super Bowl XLVIII (vs. Seahawks) 8–43
- All-Pros: 4: QB Peyton Manning; WR Demaryius Thomas; G Louis Vasquez; K Matt Prater
- Pro Bowlers: 5: Selected but did not participate due to participation in Super Bowl XLVIII: QB Peyton Manning; WR Demaryius Thomas; TE Julius Thomas; G Louis Vasquez; K Matt Prater

Uniform
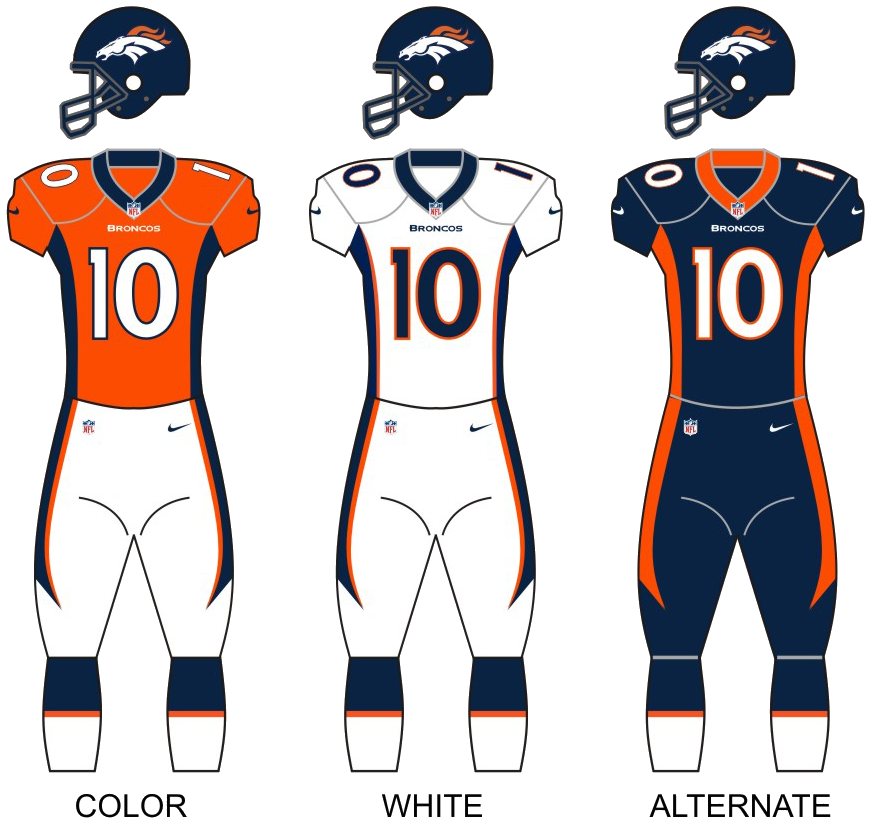

The 2013 season was the Denver Broncos' 44th in the National Football League (NFL) and their 54th overall. It also marked their 30th season under the ownership of Pat Bowlen, the second with Peyton Manning as the team's starting quarterback and the third under head coach John Fox. The 2013 Broncos were well known for their extremely powerful offense, which set the record for both the most points scored in a season and most passing yards in a season, at 606 and 5,572, respectively, both the all-time NFL records.

Following a loss to the eventual Super Bowl champion Baltimore Ravens in the divisional round of the 2012 playoffs, the Broncos entered the 2013 season as favorites to win Super Bowl XLVIII. However, the team underwent a tumultuous offseason that was dominated by the suspension of All-Pro linebacker Von Miller as well as several injuries to the offensive line. Notable offseason additions include the free agent acquisitions of wide receiver Wes Welker, linebacker Shaun Phillips, safety Quentin Jammer and cornerback Dominique Rodgers-Cromartie. Roster departures include wide receiver Brandon Stokley, linebackers Elvis Dumervil and D. J. Williams, and running back Willis McGahee.

The Broncos' 606 points (37.9 points per game) scored in the regular season is the highest total for any team playing a 16-game season. Throughout the regular season, numerous individual, league and franchise records were set, including Peyton Manning setting new NFL records for passing touchdowns and passing yardage, as well as the team setting new NFL records for touchdowns and points scored in a single season. He was named MVP for the season. During the team's mid-season bye week, head coach John Fox received a health scare that resulted in Fox missing four games due to recuperation from heart surgery. Defensive coordinator Jack Del Rio served as the team's acting head coach during Fox's absence.

The Broncos won their third consecutive AFC West division title, as well as earning a first-round bye and homefield advantage throughout the playoffs for a second consecutive season. The Broncos defeated the San Diego Chargers 24–17 in the Divisional round and then the New England Patriots 26–16 in the AFC championship game. The team faced the Seattle Seahawks in Super Bowl XLVIII – the Broncos' first Super Bowl berth since winning back-to-back Super Bowls in 1997 and 1998. However, the Broncos were unable to recover from a 22–0 halftime deficit, and the Seahawks' No. 1 ranked defense held the Broncos' No. 1 ranked offense to their lowest scoring output of the season, routing the Broncos by a score of 43–8. They also scored fewer than 27 points in all three of their playoff games despite only doing so once during the regular season. Despite leading the league in points scored, the Broncos were 22nd in points allowed, with 399 and 19th in total defense.

== Coaching and front-office changes ==
- January 15: Offensive coordinator Mike McCoy was hired as the new head coach of the San Diego Chargers. That same day, the Broncos hired Cory Undlin as the team's new secondary coach. Undlin served as the defensive quality control coach last season, and he replaces Ron Milus, whose contract was not renewed. The team cited that Milus' coaching style clashed with several players during the past two seasons.
- January 17: Adam Gase, who spent the past two seasons as the Broncos' quarterbacks coach, was promoted to offensive coordinator, replacing Mike McCoy.
- January 18: Greg Knapp was hired as the team's new quarterbacks coach, replacing Adam Gase. Knapp served as the Oakland Raiders' offensive coordinator in 2012.
- February 11: Assistant special teams coach Keith Burns was hired to the same position with the Washington Redskins. His position was filled two days later (February 13), with the hiring of Derius Swinton, who spent the 2012 season as the Kansas City Chiefs' special teams quality control coach.
- May 1: The Broncos parted ways with Keith Kidd, who served as the team's director of player personnel for the past four seasons. The team hired Tom Heckert, Jr. as Kidd's replacement six days later (May 7). Heckert previously served as a general manager with the Philadelphia Eagles from 2006 to 2009 and most recently with the Cleveland Browns from 2010 to 2012.
- May 13: Alex Gibbs, who served as the Broncos' offensive line coach from 1995 to 2003, was hired as an offensive consultant.
- May 31: John Spytek was hired as the team's director of college scouting. Spytek previously worked in the same capacity during the past two seasons with the Cleveland Browns, alongside former Browns' general manager Tom Heckert, Jr.

=== Absence of John Fox ===
On November 2, 2013, during the Broncos' bye week, head coach John Fox was hospitalized after experiencing light-headedness while playing golf in Charlotte, North Carolina. Fox was held in a Charlotte-area hospital for further testing, and doctors indicated that he needed aortic valve replacement surgery and would be out for up to two months. Fox knew about his heart condition, and had initially hoped to postpone his surgery until after the season, however, two days later (November 4), Fox underwent the successful surgery. Defensive coordinator Jack Del Rio was named the interim head coach during Fox's absence. Del Rio had previously served as head coach of the Jacksonville Jaguars from 2003 to 2011, as well as a defensive coordinator on Fox's staff with the Carolina Panthers in 2002. On December 2, Fox returned to the Broncos' training camp facility at Dove Valley, in preparation for the team's Week 14 game against the Tennessee Titans.

== Roster changes ==
=== Free agents ===
Position	Player	Tag	2013 team	Notes
RB	Lance Ball	RFA	None	assigned tender on March 8, re-signed April 8, released August 31
DT	Justin Bannan	UFA	Detroit Lions	signed with the Lions on August 15
LB	Keith Brooking	UFA	None	
S	David Bruton	UFA	Denver Broncos	re-signed March 11
CB	Tony Carter	ERFA	Denver Broncos	assigned tender on March 8, re-signed April 15
OT	Ryan Clady	FT	Denver Broncos	assigned franchise tag on March 1, re-signed July 14, placed on injured reserve September 18
OT	Chris Clark	RFA	Denver Broncos	assigned tender on March 8, re-signed April 10
P	Britton Colquitt	RFA	Denver Broncos	assigned tender on March 8, re-signed April 23
FB/TE	Chris Gronkowski	RFA	None	
DE	Jason Hunter	UFA	Oakland Raiders	signed with the Raiders on March 13
C	Dan Koppen	UFA	None	re-signed June 20, placed on injured reserve July 30
S	Jim Leonhard	UFA	Buffalo Bills	signed with the Bills on September 5
CB	Tracy Porter	UFA	Oakland Raiders	signed with the Raiders on April 2
WR	Brandon Stokley	UFA	Baltimore Ravens	signed with the Ravens on August 11
DT	Mitch Unrein	ERFA	Denver Broncos	assigned tender on March 8, re-signed April 11
DT	Kevin Vickerson	UFA	Denver Broncos	re-signed March 12
DT	Ty Warren	UFA	None	
WR	Matthew Willis	UFA	None	

=== Signings ===
Position	Player	2012 team	Notes
LB	Stewart Bradley	Arizona Cardinals	signed March 13, placed on injured reserve August 31
CB	Marquice Cole	New England Patriots	signed January 14, 2014, on final roster
DT	Sione Fua	Carolina Panthers	signed November 27, on final roster
S	Michael Huff	Baltimore Ravens	signed November 19, on final roster
CB/S	Quentin Jammer	San Diego Chargers	signed May 29, on final roster
OT	Winston Justice	Indianapolis Colts	signed September 18, on final roster
DT	Terrance Knighton	Jacksonville Jaguars	signed March 13, on final roster
LB	Paris Lenon	Arizona Cardinals	signed August 20, on final roster
C	Ryan Lilja	Kansas City Chiefs	signed July 31, released August 31
CB	Nigel Malone	Pittsburgh Steelers	signed August 1, waived August 25
LB	Brandon Marshall	Jacksonville Jaguars	promoted from the Broncos' practice squad on December 24, on final roster
DE	Jeremy Mincey	Jacksonville Jaguars	signed December 17, on final roster
TE	Jake O'Connell	Kansas City Chiefs	signed July 27, released August 31
TE	DeAngelo Peterson	Washington Redskins	signed August 6, waived August 25
LB	Shaun Phillips	San Diego Chargers	signed April 27, on final roster
LB	Adrian Robinson	Pittsburgh Steelers	signed September 1, waived October 15
CB	Dominique Rodgers-Cromartie	Philadelphia Eagles	signed March 13, on final roster
C	Steve Vallos	Jacksonville Jaguars	signed July 28, on final roster
G	Louis Vasquez	San Diego Chargers	signed March 12, on final roster
WR	Wes Welker	New England Patriots	signed March 13, on final roster

Indicates that the player was a free agent at the end of his respective team's 2012 season.

=== Departures ===
Position	Player	Notes
C	Philip Blake	waived August 31
G	Justin Boren	waived August 7
G	C. J. Davis	released August 31
DE	Elvis Dumervil	released March 15
RB	Mario Fannin	waived May 22
S	Blake Gideon	designated as reserve/retired on May 22
QB	Caleb Hanie	released March 11
FB	Jacob Hester	released September 1
RB	Willis McGahee	released June 13
LB	Joe Mays	released July 23
C	J. D. Walton	waived December 17
LB	D. J. Williams	released March 11

=== Trades ===
On August 20, defensive tackle Sealver Siliga was traded to the Seattle Seahawks in exchange for guard John Moffitt. On November 5, Moffitt was placed on the reserve/left squad list.

=== Draft ===
2013 Denver Broncos Draft
Round	Selection	Player	Position	College	Notes
1	28	Sylvester Williams	DT	North Carolina	signed July 25
2	58	Montee Ball	RB	Wisconsin	signed June 13
3	90	Kayvon Webster	CB	South Florida	signed June 13
4	None – see draft trades below				
5	146	Quanterus Smith	DE	Western Kentucky	signed May 10, placed on injured reserve August 31
5	161	Tavarres King	WR	Georgia	signed May 10, waived August 31, promoted to the active roster on October 15
6	173	Vinston Painter	OT	Virginia Tech	signed May 9, waived August 31, promoted to the active roster on January 14, 2014.
7	234	Zac Dysert	QB	Miami (Ohio)	signed May 13

Draft trades

Trade partner	Broncos give	Broncos receive	Source
Green Bay Packers	fourth-round selection (No. 125)	fifth- and sixth-round selections (Nos. 146 and 173)	
Philadelphia Eagles	original sixth-round selection (No. 196)	defensive tackle Brodrick Bunkley	

=== Undrafted free agents ===
All undrafted free agents were signed just after the 2013 NFL draft concluded on April 27, unless noted otherwise.

2013 Denver Broncos undrafted free agents
Player	Position	College	Notes
RB	C. J. Anderson	California	on final roster
WR	Kemonte' Bateman	New Mexico State	waived August 25
P	Ryan Doerr	Kansas State	designated as waived/injured on August 14
OT	Manase Foketi	West Texas A&M	waived August 25
DT	Romney Fuga	BYU	signed April 30, waived August 31
CB	Aaron Hester	UCLA	waived August 31
LB	Damien Holmes	UCLA	signed May 13, waived August 31
QB	Ryan Katz	San Diego State	waived August 25
LB	Uona Kaveinga	BYU	waived August 25
DE	Gary Mason Jr.	Baylor	released May 12, following a failed physical exam
LB	Lerentee McCray	Florida	placed on injured reserve August 31
WR	Quincy McDuffie	Central Florida	designated as waived/injured on August 25
S	Ross Rasner	Arkansas	waived August 31
TE	Lucas Reed	New Mexico	designated as waived/injured on July 28
LB	Douglas Rippy	Colorado	released May 12
DE	Langston Tanyi	Colorado State	signed May 13, waived August 25
WR	Lamar Thomas	New Mexico	waived August 31
DE	John Youboty	Temple	waived August 31, assigned to the practice squad September 1

=== Von Miller suspension ===
On July 22, 2013, All-Pro linebacker Von Miller was initially suspended for a duration of four games due to his violation of NFL's drug policy, though initial reports indicated that his suspension did not involve the NFL's Steroids and Related Substances Policy. The Denver Post reported that Miller tested positive for marijuana and amphetamine during his rookie season in 2011 on multiple occasions. Miller appealed the suspension. However, on August 20 Miller's suspension period was increased from four to six games due to findings of other drug testing issues within the previous two years. On September 9, reports circulated that the Broncos were attempting to re-claim a $1.25 million signing bonus from Miller as a result of the suspension. On September 22, ESPN reported that the reason for Miller's suspension being increased from four to six games was due to Miller attempting to cheat a drug test with the aid of a urine collector, which nearly led to Miller being suspended for the entire 2013 season.

=== Injuries ===
- July 24: Guard Chris Kuper, along with center J. D. Walton, was placed on the Physically Unable to Perform (PUP) list. Kuper recovered from ankle surgery, resulting from an injury that forced him to miss the majority of the 2012 season. Kuper was later activated on August 13, and returned to practice that same day.
- July 28: Center Dan Koppen suffered a ruptured ACL in his knee during the fourth day of training camp, and was placed on the season-ending injured reserve on July 30.
- August 3: The Denver Post reported that tight end Joel Dreessen underwent arthroscopic knee surgery during the offseason. Dreessen missed the first three games of the regular season.
- August 17: Cornerback Champ Bailey injured his left foot during the team's second preseason game against the Seattle Seahawks, and missed the majority of the regular season after re-aggravating the injury during the team's Week 7 loss to the Indianapolis Colts.
- August 27: Center J. D. Walton was moved from the active PUP list to the reserve PUP list, and missed the first eight weeks of the regular season. Walton originally underwent surgery on his left ankle back in June – the same ankle that he fractured and dislocated during the team's September 30, 2012 game vs. the Oakland Raiders last season. However, he later suffered an infection that hindered his recovery. Walton was later waived on December 17. Also on August 27, safety Quinton Carter was placed on injured reserve due to aftereffects from a knee injury that he suffered last season.
- August 31: Rookie defensive end Quanterus Smith, the team's fifth-round selection in the 2013 NFL draft, was placed on injured reserve. Smith suffered a torn ACL in his knee during his 2012 senior season at Western Kentucky, and though he participated in all four of the Broncos' preseason games, the team determined that Smith had not fully recovered from the injury.
- September 15: All-Pro offensive tackle Ryan Clady injured his foot during the team's Week 2 win over the New York Giants. Three days later (September 18), the team announced that Clady suffered a Lisfranc fracture, and placed him on the season ending injured reserve.
- October 6: Linebacker Wesley Woodyard suffered a stinger in his neck during the team's Week 5 win over the Dallas Cowboys, and missed the team's next two games.
- November 17: Safety Rahim Moore suffered a lower leg injury, while tight end Julius Thomas sprained his knee during the Broncos' Week 11 win over the Kansas City Chiefs. Thomas missed the team's next two games, while Moore and was diagnosed with lateral compartment syndrome in his lower left leg the following day (November 18). Moore was placed on the injured reserve, with a designation to return. He missed the remainder of the regular season, and was eligible to return for the playoffs, but had a slow recovery and missed the Super Bowl.
- November 24: Defensive tackle Kevin Vickerson suffered a dislocated hip during the Broncos' Week 12 loss to the New England Patriots, and was placed on the season-ending injured reserve three days later (November 27).
- November 29: Defensive tackle Derek Wolfe fell ill as the Broncos were boarding a team bus to Kansas City, two days before their Week 13 game vs. the Kansas City Chiefs. Wolfe was rushed to a Denver-area hospital, and was diagnosed with seizure-like symptoms the following day (November 30), and missed the remainder of the regular season. He also missed the Broncos' first playoff game on January 12, 2014, against the San Diego Chargers, and was officially placed on the season-ending injured reserve two days later (January 14).
- December 8: Wide receiver Wes Welker suffered a concussion during the Broncos' Week 14 win over the Tennessee Titans – his second concussion in a three-week span. Welker missed the remainder of the regular season, but was cleared by team doctors for game action on December 30, and returned for the Broncos' first playoff game on January 12, 2014.
- December 22: Linebacker Von Miller injured his knee during the Broncos' Week 16 win over the Houston Texans. The following day (December 23), the team confirmed that Miller tore the ACL in his right knee, and Miller was placed on injured reserve on December 24.
- January 12, 2014: Cornerback Chris Harris, Jr. tore the ACL in his left knee during the Broncos' 24–17 Divisional playoff win over the San Diego Chargers, and was placed on injured reserve two days later (January 14).

== Staff ==
2013 Denver Broncos staff
Front office: Owner/chairman/CEO – Pat Bowlen; President – Joe Ellis; Executive vice president of football operations – John Elway; Director of football administration – Mike Sullivan; Director of player personnel – Matt Russell; Director of pro personnel – Tom Heckert, Jr.; Director of college scouting – John Spytek; Assistant director of college scouting – Lenny McGill; Assistant director of pro personnel – Anthony Kelly; Director of player development – Jerry Butler; Head coaches: Head coach – John Fox; Offensive coaches: Offensive coordinator – Adam Gase; Quarterbacks – Greg Knapp; Running backs – Eric Studesville; Wide receivers – Tyke Tolbert; Tight ends – Clancy Barone; Offensive line – Dave Magazu; Offensive line consultant – Alex Gibbs; Offensive assistant – Brian Callahan; Offensive assistant - Jim Bob Cooter	Defensive coaches: Defensive coordinator – Jack Del Rio; Defensive line – Jay Rodgers; Linebackers – Richard Smith; Secondary – Cory Undlin; Assistant secondary – Sam Garnes; Defensive quality control – Chris Beake; Special teams coaches: Special teams coordinator – Jeff Rodgers; Assistant special teams – Derius Swinton II; Strength and conditioning: Strength and conditioning – Luke Richesson; Assistant strength and conditioning – Mike Eubanks; Assistant strength and conditioning – Jason George; Assistant strength and conditioning – Anthony Lomando

== Final roster ==
2013 Denver Broncos roster
Quarterbacks (QB): 2 Zac Dysert; 18 Peyton Manning; 17 Brock Osweiler; Running backs (RB): 22 C. J. Anderson; 28 Montee Ball; 21 Ronnie Hillman; 27 Knowshon Moreno; Wide receivers (WR): 12 Andre Caldwell; 87 Eric Decker; 11 Trindon Holliday; 88 Demaryius Thomas; 83 Wes Welker; Tight ends (TE): 81 Joel Dreessen; 85 Virgil Green; 84 Jacob Tamme; 80 Julius Thomas	Offensive linemen (OL): 68 Zane Beadles G; 75 Chris Clark T; 74 Orlando Franklin T; 77 Winston Justice T; 73 Chris Kuper G; 66 Manny Ramirez C; 60 Steve Vallos C; 65 Louis Vasquez G; Defensive linemen (DL): 91 Robert Ayers DE; 98 Sione Fua DT; 97 Malik Jackson DE; 94 Terrance Knighton DT; 57 Jeremy Mincey DE; 90 Shaun Phillips DE; 96 Mitch Unrein DT; 92 Sylvester Williams DT; 95 Derek Wolfe DE	Linebackers (LB): 56 Nate Irving OLB; 53 Steven Johnson OLB; 51 Paris Lenon MLB; 54 Brandon Marshall OLB; 59 Danny Trevathan OLB; 52 Wesley Woodyard MLB; Defensive backs (DB): 20 Mike Adams FS; 24 Champ Bailey CB; 31 Omar Bolden SS; 30 David Bruton SS; 32 Tony Carter CB; 25 Chris Harris Jr. CB; 29 Michael Huff FS; 33 Duke Ihenacho SS; 23 Quentin Jammer CB; 45 Dominique Rodgers-Cromartie CB; 36 Kayvon Webster CB; Special teams (ST): 46 Aaron Brewer LS; 4 Britton Colquitt P; 5 Matt Prater K	Practice squad: 43 John Boyett S; 71 Paul Cornick T; 72 Hall Davis DE; 63 Ben Garland G; 72 Brandon Moore DE; 70 Vinston Painter T; 13 Nathan Palmer WR; 10 Gerell Robinson WR; 79 John Youboty DE; Reserve: 55 Stewart Bradley MLB (IR); 38 Quinton Carter SS (IR); 78 Ryan Clady T (IR); 67 Dan Koppen C (IR); 47 Lerentee McCray OLB (IR); 58 Von Miller OLB (IR); 26 Rahim Moore FS (IR/DFR); 93 Quanterus Smith DE (IR); 99 Kevin Vickerson DT (IR); Rookies in italics 53 active, 9 reserve, 8 practice squad

== Preseason ==
Week	Date	Opponent	Result	Record	Venue	Recap
1	August 8	at San Francisco 49ers	W 10–6	1–0	Candlestick Park	Recap
2	August 17	at Seattle Seahawks	L 10–40	1–1	CenturyLink Field	Recap
3	August 24	St. Louis Rams	W 27–26	2–1	Sports Authority Field at Mile High	Recap
4	August 29	Arizona Cardinals	L 24–32	2–2	Sports Authority Field at Mile High	Recap

== Regular season ==
=== Schedule ===
Week	Date	Opponent	Result	Record	Venue	Recap
1	September 5	Baltimore Ravens	**W** 49–27	1–0	Sports Authority Field at Mile High	Recap
2	September 15	at New York Giants	**W** 41–23	2–0	MetLife Stadium	Recap
3	September 23	**Oakland Raiders**	**W** 37–21	3–0	Sports Authority Field at Mile High	Recap
4	September 29	Philadelphia Eagles	**W** 52–20	4–0	Sports Authority Field at Mile High	Recap
5	October 6	at Dallas Cowboys	**W** 51–48	5–0	AT&T Stadium	Recap
6	October 13	Jacksonville Jaguars	**W** 35–19	6–0	Sports Authority Field at Mile High	Recap
7	October 20	at Indianapolis Colts	**L** 33–39	6–1	Lucas Oil Stadium	Recap
8	October 27	Washington Redskins	**W** 45–21	7–1	Sports Authority Field at Mile High	Recap
9	Bye					
10	November 10	at **San Diego Chargers**	**W** 28–20	8–1	Qualcomm Stadium	Recap
11	November 17	**Kansas City Chiefs**	**W** 27–17	9–1	Sports Authority Field at Mile High	Recap
12	November 24	at New England Patriots	**L** 31–34 (OT)	9–2	Gillette Stadium	Recap
13	December 1	at **Kansas City Chiefs**	**W** 35–28	10–2	Arrowhead Stadium	Recap
14	December 8	Tennessee Titans	**W** 51–28	11–2	Sports Authority Field at Mile High	Recap
15	December 12	**San Diego Chargers**	**L** 20–27	11–3	Sports Authority Field at Mile High	Recap
16	December 22	at Houston Texans	**W** 37–13	12–3	Reliant Stadium	Recap
17	December 29	at **Oakland Raiders**	**W** 34–14	13–3	O.co Coliseum	Recap

Note: Intra-division opponents are in bold text.

=== Game summaries ===
==== Week 1: vs. Baltimore Ravens ====
NFL Kickoff Game

Week One: Baltimore Ravens at Denver Broncos – Game summary

Quarter	1	2	3	4	Total
Ravens	7	10	0	10	**27**
**Broncos**	0	14	21	14	**49**

at Sports Authority Field at Mile High, Denver, Colorado

- Date: September 5
- Game time: 7:12 p.m. MDT
- Game weather: 83 °F (28 °C), mostly cloudy, light rain
- Game attendance: 76,977
- Referee: Walt Coleman
- TV announcers (NBC): Al Michaels, Cris Collinsworth and Michele Tafoya
- Recap, Gamebook

Game information

**First quarter**

- BAL – Vonta Leach 2-yard pass from Joe Flacco (Justin Tucker kick), 7:11. Ravens 7–0. **Drive: 10 plays, 80 yards, 3:58.**

**Second quarter**

- DEN – Julius Thomas 24-yard pass from Peyton Manning (Matt Prater kick), 11:35. Tied 7–7. **Drive: 1 play, 24 yards, 0:05.**
- BAL – Ray Rice 1-yard run (Justin Tucker kick), 8:03. Ravens 14–7. **Drive: 1 play, 1 yard, 0:05.**
- DEN – Julius Thomas 23-yard pass from Peyton Manning (Matt Prater kick), 5:34. Tied 14–14. **Drive: 6 plays, 80 yards, 2:29.**
- BAL – Justin Tucker 25-yard field goal. (BAL 17–14. **Drive: 13 plays, 77 yards, 3:12.**

**Third quarter**

- DEN – Andre Caldwell 28-yard pass from Peyton Manning (Matt Prater kick), 12:30. Broncos 21–17. **Drive: 6 plays, 80 yards, 2:30.**
- DEN – Wes Welker 5-yard pass from Peyton Manning (Matt Prater kick), 10:28. Broncos 28–17. **Drive: 2 plays, 10 yards, 0:40.**
- DEN – Wes Welker 2-yard pass from Peyton Manning (Matt Prater kick), 6:37. Broncos 35–17. **Drive: 9 plays, 63 yards, 2:29.**

**Fourth quarter**

- DEN – Demaryius Thomas 26-yard pass from Peyton Manning (Matt Prater kick), 13:13. Broncos 42–17. **Drive: 5 plays, 56 yards, 1:33.**
- BAL – Marlon Brown 13-yard pass from Joe Flacco (Justin Tucker kick), 10:28. Broncos 42–24. **Drive: 5 plays, 80 yards, 1:38.**
- BAL – Justin Tucker 30-yard field goal, 5:29. Broncos 42–27. **Drive: 8 plays, 57 yards, 2:38.**
- DEN – Demaryius Thomas 78-yard pass from Peyton Manning (Matt Prater kick), 4:30. Broncos 49–27. **Drive: 3 plays, 80 yards, 0:59.**

**Top passers**

- BAL – Joe Flacco – 34/62, 362 yards, 2 TD, 2 INT
- DEN – Peyton Manning –27/42, 462 yards, 7 TD

**Top rushers**

- BAL – Ray Rice – 12 rushes, 36 yards, TD
- DEN – Knowshon Moreno – 9 rushes, 28 yards

**Top receivers**

- BAL – Torrey Smith – 4 receptions 92 yards
- DEN – Demaryius Thomas – 5 receptions, 161 yards, 2 TD

The Broncos kicked off their 2013 season at home against the Baltimore Ravens in the NFL kickoff game, in a highly publicized rematch of their 2012 Divisional playoff game. The Ravens grabbed the early lead in the first quarter, with quarterback Joe Flacco tossing a 2-yard touchdown pass to fullback Vonta Leach. Following a Flacco interception, the Broncos responded early in the second quarter, with quarterback Peyton Manning throwing a 24-yard touchdown pass to tight end Julius Thomas. After Broncos' wide receiver Wes Welker muffed a punt return near the goal line, the Ravens grabbed the lead, with running back Ray Rice rushing for a 1-yard touchdown, but the Broncos responded, with Manning connecting with Julius Thomas on another touchdown pass – from 23 yards out. The Ravens grabbed a 17–14 lead just before halftime, with placekicker Justin Tucker nailing a 25-yard field goal. However, the Broncos reeled off 28 unanswered points, with Manning throwing four more touchdown passes – a 28-yarder to wide receiver Andre Caldwell, two to Welker from 5 and 2 yards out, followed in the fourth quarter by a 26-yarder to wide receiver Demaryius Thomas. The second score came after Broncos' safety David Bruton blocked a Sam Koch punt. The Ravens later scored 10 unanswered points, with Flacco throwing a 13-yard touchdown to wide receiver Marlon Brown, followed by a 30-yard field goal from Tucker to pull to within 42–27 with 5:29 remaining in the fourth quarter. However, the Broncos subsequently put the game out of reach, after Manning threw his seventh touchdown pass of the game – a 78-yarder to Demaryius Thomas.

Notes

The start of the game was delayed 33 minutes due to lightning in the Denver area.

==== Week 2: at New York Giants ====
Week Two: Denver Broncos at New York Giants – Game summary

Quarter	1	2	3	4	Total
**Broncos**	0	10	14	17	**41**
Giants	3	6	7	7	**23**

at MetLife Stadium, East Rutherford, New Jersey

- Date: September 15
- Game time: 4:25 p.m. EDT/2:25 pm. MDT
- Game weather: 70 °F (21 °C), mostly sunny
- Game attendance: 81,285
- Referee: Gene Steratore
- TV announcers (CBS): Jim Nantz, Phil Simms and Tracy Wolfson
- Recap, Gamebook

Game information

**First quarter**

- NYG – Josh Brown 36-yard field goal, 7:41. Giants 3–0. **Drive: 7 plays, 62 yards, 3:09.**

**Second quarter**

- DEN – Knowshon Moreno 20-yard run (Matt Prater kick), 14:22. Broncos 7–3. **Drive: 4 plays, 40 yards, 0:48.**
- NYG – Josh Brown 24-yard field goal, 6:53. Broncos 7–6. **Drive: 6 plays, 37 yards, 2:31.**
- NYG – Josh Brown 41-yard field goal, 2:19. Giants 9–7. **Drive: 7 plays, 37 yards, 3:46.**
- DEN – Matt Prater 42-yard field goal, 0:47. Broncos 10–9. **Drive: 8 plays, 56 yards, 1:32.**

**Third quarter**

- DEN – Wes Welker 2-yard pass from Peyton Manning (Matt Prater kick), 8:58. Broncos 17–9. **Drive: 9 plays, 53 yards, 4:28.**
- NYG – Brandon Jacobs 1-yard run (Josh Brown kick), 3:08. Broncos 17–16.**Drive: 9 plays, 81 yards, 5:50.**
- DEN – Knowshon Moreno 25-yard run (Matt Prater kick), 0:25. Broncos 24–16. **Drive: 7 plays, 80 yards, 2:43.**

**Fourth quarter**

- DEN – Julius Thomas 11-yard pass from Peyton Manning (Matt Prater kick), 12:19. Broncos 31–16. **Drive: 5 plays, 36 yards, 2:34.**
- DEN – Trindon Holliday 81-yard punt return (Matt Prater kick), 10:13. Broncos 38–16.
- NYG – Da'Rel Scott 23-yard pass from Eli Manning (Josh Brown kick), 3:59. Broncos 38–23. **Drive: 4 plays, 71 yards, 1:13.**
- DEN – Matt Prater 47-yard field goal, 2:38. Broncos 41–23. **Drive: 7 plays, 15 yards, 1:21.**

**Top passers**

- DEN – Peyton Manning – 30/43, 307 yards, 2 TD
- NYG – Eli Manning – 28/49, 362 yards, TD, 4 INT

**Top rushers**

- DEN – Knowshon Moreno – 13 rushes, 93 yards, 2 TD
- NYG – David Wilson – 7 rushes, 17 yards

**Top receivers**

- DEN – Eric Decker – 9 receptions, 87 yards
- NYG – Victor Cruz – 8 receptions, 118 yards

Coming off their season-opening win over the defending Super Bowl champion Ravens, the Broncos traveled to East Rutherford, New Jersey, for an interconference duel against the New York Giants at MetLife Stadium. This was the third match-up between brothers Peyton Manning (Broncos) and Eli Manning (Giants), with Peyton Manning winning the previous two match-ups as a member of the Indianapolis Colts – 2006 and 2010. The Giants grabbed the lead midway through the first quarter, with a 36-yard field goal by placekicker Josh Brown. In the second quarter, a 20-yard touchdown run by running back Knowshon Moreno gave the Broncos the lead. Two field goals by Brown – from 24 and 41 yards – gave the Giants a 9–7 lead. The Broncos re-claimed the lead just before halftime, with placekicker Matt Prater nailing a 42-yard field goal. The Broncos increased their lead in the third quarter, with quarterback Peyton Manning connecting on a 2-yard touchdown pass to wide receiver Wes Welker. The Giants responded, with running back Brandon Jacobs rushing for a 1-yard touchdown to pull the Giants to within 17–16 with three minutes remaining in the third quarter. However, the Broncos seized control of the game with 21 unanswered points, beginning with a 25-yard touchdown run by Moreno, followed in the fourth quarter by an 11-yard touchdown pass from Peyton Manning to tight end Julius Thomas, and return specialist Trindon Holliday returning a punt 81 yards for a touchdown. The Giants tried to rally, with quarterback Eli Manning throwing a 23-yard touchdown pass to running back Da'Rel Scott with four minutes remaining in the fourth quarter, but a 47-yard field goal by Prater put the game out of reach.

Notes

Peyton Manning improved his head-to-head record against Eli Manning to 3–0. This would be the last time the Manning brothers played against each other in the NFL, with Peyton retiring following the 2015 season.

Injuries

Offensive tackle Ryan Clady suffered a Lisfranc fracture in his foot late in the fourth quarter, and was placed on injured reserve three days later (September 18).

==== Week 3: vs. Oakland Raiders ====
Week Three: Oakland Raiders at Denver Broncos – Game summary

Quarter	1	2	3	4	Total
Raiders	0	7	7	7	**21**
**Broncos**	10	17	3	7	**37**

at Sports Authority Field at Mile High, Denver, Colorado

- Date: September 23
- Game time: 6:40 pm. MDT
- Game weather: 64 °F (18 °C), mostly clear
- Game attendance: 76,978
- Referee: Jerome Boger
- TV announcers (ESPN): Mike Tirico, Jon Gruden and Lisa Salters
- Recap, Gamebook

Game information

**First quarter**

- DEN – Eric Decker 2-yard pass from Peyton Manning (Matt Prater kick), 10:28. Broncos 7–0. **Drive: 8 plays, 55 yards, 3:23.**
- DEN – Matt Prater 53-yard field goal, 0:47. Broncos 10–0. **Drive: 6 plays, 24 yards, 3:42.**

**Second quarter**

- DEN – Wes Welker 12-yard pass from Peyton Manning (Matt Prater kick), 7:27. Broncos 17–0. **Drive: 10 plays, 80 yards, 4:35.**
- OAK – Denarius Moore 73-yard pass from Terrelle Pryor (Sebastian Janikowski kick), 5:57. Broncos 17–7. **Drive: 3 plays, 80 yards, 1:30.**
- DEN – Julius Thomas 13-yard pass from Peyton Manning (Matt Prater kick), 3:40. Broncos 24–7. **Drive: 4 plays, 80 yards, 2:17.**
- DEN – Matt Prater 41-yard field goal, 0:19. Broncos 27–7. **Drive: 7 plays, 38 yards, 1:30.**

**Third quarter**

- DEN – Matt Prater 40-yard field goal, 8:41. Broncos 30–7. **Drive: 13 plays, 55 yards, 6:19.**
- OAK – Marcel Reece 16-yard pass from Darren McFadden (Sebastian Janikowski kick), 0:17. Broncos 30–14. **Drive: 6 plays, 70 yards, 2:26.**

**Fourth quarter**

- DEN – Ronnie Hillman 1-yard run (Matt Prater kick), 11:27. Broncos 37–14. **Drive: 8 plays, 80 yards, 3:50.**
- OAK – Darren McFadden 1-yard run (Sebastian Janikowski kick), 1:15. Broncos 37–21. **Drive: 4 plays, 20 yards, 1:04.**

**Top passers**

- OAK – Terrelle Pryor – 19/28, 281 yards, TD
- DEN – Peyton Manning – 32/37, 374 yards, 3 TD

**Top rushers**

- OAK – Terrelle Pryor – 4 rushes, 36 yards
- DEN – Ronnie Hillman – 9 rushes, 66 yards, TD

**Top receivers**

- OAK – Denarius Moore – 6 receptions, 124 yards, TD
- DEN – Eric Decker – 8 receptions, 133 yards, TD

Coming off their win over the Giants, the Broncos returned home for an AFC West duel with the Oakland Raiders on Monday Night Football. The Broncos jumped out to a 17–0 lead, with a two-yard touchdown pass from quarterback Peyton Manning to wide receiver Eric Decker, a 53-yard field goal by placekicker Matt Prater and 12-yard touchdown pass from Manning to wide receiver Wes Welker, the latter of which occurred in the second quarter. The Raiders got on the scoreboard when quarterback Terrelle Pryor completed a 73-yard touchdown pass to wide receiver Denarius Moore. The Broncos subsequently added to their lead, with Manning throwing a 13-yard touchdown pass to tight end Julius Thomas, followed by two field goals by Prater – a 41-yarder just before halftime and a 40-yarder midway through the third quarter. Following a Manning fumble, the Raiders narrowed the Broncos' lead, with Pryor tossing the football on a running play to running back Darren McFadden, and McFadden throwing a 16-yard touchdown pass to fullback Marcel Reece, however, the Broncos responded early in the fourth quarter, with running back Ronnie Hillman rushing for a 1-yard touchdown. The Raiders scored a late touchdown, with McFadden rushing for a 1-yard touchdown, however, the Broncos recovered the ensuing onside kick, sealing the win.

Notes

This was the 17th meeting on Monday Night Football between the Broncos and Raiders – tied for the most frequent pairing in Monday Night Football history with the Dallas Cowboys & Washington Redskins, who met for a 17th time in 2015.

==== Week 4: vs. Philadelphia Eagles ====
Week Four: Philadelphia Eagles at Denver Broncos – Game summary

Quarter	1	2	3	4	Total
Eagles	3	10	0	7	**20**
**Broncos**	14	7	21	10	**52**

at Sports Authority Field at Mile High, Denver, Colorado

- Date: September 29
- Game time: 2:25 pm. MDT
- Game weather: 76 °F (24 °C), partly cloudy
- Game attendance: 77,002
- Referee: Pete Morelli
- TV announcers (Fox): Joe Buck, Troy Aikman and Pam Oliver
- Recap, Gamebook

Game information

**First quarter**

- DEN – Wes Welker 6-yard pass from Peyton Manning (Matt Prater kick), 10:19. Broncos 7–0. **Drive: 9 plays, 74 yards, 3:52.**
- PHI – Alex Henery 35-yard field goal, 6:03. Broncos 7–3. **Drive: 11 plays, 65 yards, 4:16.**
- DEN – Trindon Holliday 105-yard kickoff return (Matt Prater kick), 5:50. Broncos 14–3. **Drive: 0 plays, 0 yards, 0:13.**

**Second quarter**

- PHI – Alex Henery 25-yard field goal, 14:18. Broncos 14–6. **Drive: 15 plays, 73 yards, 6:32.**
- PHI – Chris Polk 4-yard run (Alex Henery kick), 11:06. Broncos 14–13. **Drive: 7 plays, 64 yards, 2:10.**
- DEN – Knowshon Moreno 4-yard run (Matt Prater kick), 5:05. Broncos 21–13. **Drive: 11 plays, 80 yards, 6:01.**

**Third quarter**

- DEN – Demaryius Thomas 1-yard pass from Peyton Manning (Matt Prater kick), 9:54. Broncos 28–13. **Drive: 10 plays, 80 yards, 5:06.**
- DEN – Demaryius Thomas 15-yard pass from Peyton Manning (Matt Prater kick), 5:10. Broncos 35–13. **Drive: 8 plays, 80 yards, 3:12.**
- DEN – Wes Welker 4-yard pass from Peyton Manning (Matt Prater kick), 0:22. Broncos 42–13. **Drive: 7 plays, 65 yards, 3:35.**

**Fourth quarter**

- DEN – Steven Johnson 17-yard return of blocked punt (Matt Prater kick), 13:54. Broncos 49–13.
- DEN – Matt Prater 53-yard field goal, 6:53. Broncos 52–13. **Drive: 7 plays, 30 yards, 3:49.**
- PHI – Jeff Maehl 6-yard pass from Nick Foles (Alex Henery kick), 4:35. Broncos 52–20. **Drive: 7 plays, 80 yards, 2:18.**

**Top passers**

- PHI – Michael Vick – 14/27, 248 yards
- DEN – Peyton Manning – 28/34, 327 yards, 4 TD

**Top rushers**

- PHI – LeSean McCoy – 16 rushes, 73 yards
- DEN – Knowshon Moreno – 12 rushes, 78 yards, TD

**Top receivers**

- PHI – Brent Celek – 3 receptions, 57 yards
- DEN – Eric Decker – 5 receptions, 88 yards

Coming off their Monday Night win over the Raiders, the Broncos remained on home ground for an interconference duel with the Philadelphia Eagles. A 6-yard touchdown pass from quarterback Peyton Manning to wide receiver Wes Welker gave the Broncos the early lead. The Eagles countered, with a 35-yard field goal by placekicker Alex Henery, however, the Broncos subsequently increased their lead, with return specialist Trindon Holliday returning the ensuing kickoff 105 yards for a touchdown. The Eagles cut into the Broncos' lead in the second quarter, with a 25-yard field goal by Henery, followed by running back Chris Polk rushing for a 4-yard touchdown to pull to within 14–13. However, the Broncos proceeded to score 38 unanswered points and take control of the game. First, running back Knowshon Moreno rushed for a 4-yard touchdown. Then in the third quarter, Manning added three more touchdown passes – a 1-yarder and a 15-yarder to wide receiver Demaryius Thomas, followed by a 4-yarder to Welker. In the fourth quarter, Broncos' linebacker Steven Johnson blocked Donnie Jones' punt and immediately returned the football 17 yards for a touchdown, which was followed by a 53-yard field goal by placekicker Matt Prater. The Eagles scored a late touchdown, with quarterback Nick Foles, playing in place of Michael Vick, completing a 6-yard touchdown pass to wide receiver Jeff Maehl, but the outcome of the game had already been decided in the Broncos' favor.

Notes This was Denver's last win over Philly until 2025. Former offensive lineman Tom Nalen, who played with the Broncos from 1994 to 2007, was inducted to the Broncos Ring of Fame during halftime. Nalen made it to five Pro Bowls, earning the NFL's Offensive Lineman of the Year award in 2003, and was an integral part of 11 seasons in which the Broncos had at least one running back rush for 1,000 yards within a season. Steven Johnson's return of a blocked punt for a touchdown marked the first such play for the Broncos' special teams since 2000.

==== Week 5: at Dallas Cowboys ====
Week Five: Denver Broncos at Dallas Cowboys – Game summary

Quarter	1	2	3	4	Total
**Broncos**	7	21	10	13	**51**
Cowboys	14	6	13	15	**48**

at AT&T Stadium, Arlington, Texas

- Date: October 6
- Game time: 3:25 p.m. CDT/2:25 pm. MDT
- Game weather: Played indoors (retractable roof closed)
- Game attendance: 92,758
- Referee: Terry McAulay
- TV announcers (CBS): Jim Nantz and Phil Simms
- Recap, Gamebook

Game information

**First quarter**

- DAL – Dez Bryant 2–yard pass from Tony Romo (Dan Bailey kick), 8:06. Cowboys 7–0. **Drive: 11 plays, 79 yards, 6:54.**
- DAL – DeMarco Murray 4–yard run (Dan Bailey kick), 3:18. Cowboys 14–0. **Drive: 7 plays, 45 yards, 3:35.**
- DEN – Julius Thomas 4–yard pass from Peyton Manning (Matt Prater kick), 2:28. Cowboys 14–7. **Drive: 3 plays, 80 yards, 0:50.**

**Second quarter**

- DAL – Dan Bailey 43–yard field goal, 12:14. Cowboys 17–7. **Drive: 10 plays, 55 yards, 5:14.**
- DEN – Eric Decker 2–yard pass from Peyton Manning (Matt Prater kick), 9:06. Cowboys 17–14. **Drive: 7 plays, 71 yards, 3:08.**
- DEN – Julius Thomas 9–yard pass from Peyton Manning (Matt Prater kick), 5:22. Broncos 21–17. **Drive: 6 plays, 41 yards, 3:27.**
- DEN – Peyton Manning 1–yard run (Matt Prater kick), 0:46. Broncos 28–17. **Drive: 7 plays, 64 yards, 2:24.**
- DAL – Dan Bailey 48–yard field goal, 0:00. Broncos 28–20. **Drive: 4 plays, 43 yards, 0:46.**

**Third quarter**

- DEN – Wes Welker 2–yard pass from Peyton Manning (Matt Prater kick), 8:03. Broncos 35–20. **Drive: 12 plays, 56 yards, 6:57.**
- DAL – Terrance Williams 82–yard pass from Tony Romo (Dan Bailey kick), 7:08. Broncos 35–27. **Drive: 2 plays, 83 yards, 0:55.**
- DEN – Matt Prater 48–yard field goal, 3:23. Broncos 38–27. **Drive: 8 plays, 47 yards, 3:45.**
- DAL – Dez Bryant 2–yard pass from Tony Romo (run failed), 0:14. Broncos 38–33. **Drive: 7 plays, 80 yards, 3:09.**

**Fourth quarter**

- DAL – Jason Witten 10–yard pass from Tony Romo (Tony Romo–Terrance Williams pass), 13:38. Cowboys 41–38. **Drive: 5 plays, 51 yards, 1:24.**
- DEN – Matt Prater 50–yard field goal, 9:37. Tied 41–41. **Drive: 11 plays, 51 yards, 1:24.**
- DAL – Cole Beasley 4–yard pass from Tony Romo (Dan Bailey kick), 7:19. Cowboys 48–41. **Drive: 4 plays, 87 yards, 2:18.**
- DEN – Knowshon Moreno 1–yard run (Matt Prater kick), 2:39. Tied 48–48. **Drive: 9 plays, 73 yards, 4:40.**
- DEN – Matt Prater 28–yard field goal, 0:00. Broncos 51–48. **Drive: 8 plays, 14 yards, 1:57.**

**Top passers**

- DEN – Peyton Manning – 33/42, 414 yards, 4 TD, INT
- DAL – Tony Romo – 25/36, 506 yards, 5 TD, INT

**Top rushers**

- DEN – Knowshon Moreno – 19 rushes, 93 yards, TD
- DAL – DeMarco Murray – 12 rushes, 43 yards, TD

**Top receivers**

- DEN – Julius Thomas – 9 receptions, 122 yards, 2 TD
- DAL – Terrance Williams – 4 receptions, 151 yards, TD

Coming off their blowout win over the Eagles, the Broncos traveled to Arlington, Texas, for an interconference duel with the Dallas Cowboys at AT&T Stadium. The Cowboys grabbed a 14–0 lead in the first quarter, with a 2-yard touchdown pass from quarterback Tony Romo to wide receiver Dez Bryant, followed by running back DeMarco Murray rushing for a 4-yard touchdown. The latter score occurred after a fumble by Broncos' wide receiver Eric Decker. The Broncos later got on the scoreboard, with quarterback Peyton Manning connecting on a 4-yard shovel pass to tight end Julius Thomas for a touchdown. Early in the second quarter, a 43-yard field goal by placekicker Dan Bailey gave the Cowboys a 17–7 lead. The Broncos then reeled off 21 unanswered points, with Manning adding two more touchdown passes – a 2-yarder to Decker and a 9-yarder to Thomas, followed by Manning rushing for a 1-yard touchdown on a bootleg play. A 48-yard field goal by Bailey at the end of the first half narrowed the Broncos' lead to 28–20.

The Broncos added to their lead midway through the third quarter, with Manning connecting on a 2-yard touchdown pass to wide receiver Wes Welker. However, the Cowboys subsequently began chipping away at the Broncos' lead, with Romo connecting on an 82-yard touchdown pass to wide receiver Terrance Williams. A 48-yard field goal by placekicker Matt Prater gave the Broncos a 38–27 lead, but the Cowboys further narrowed the Broncos' lead, with a 2-yard touchdown pass from Romo to Bryant (with an unsuccessful two-point conversion attempt). On the Broncos' next possession, Manning threw his first interception of the season, and the Cowboys subsequently re-claimed the lead early in the fourth quarter, with Romo throwing a 10-yard touchdown pass to tight end Jason Witten, coupled with a two-point pass from Romo to Williams. The Broncos tied the game at 41–41 on their next possession, with a 50-yard field goal by Prater, however, on the Cowboys' next possession, Romo connected on a 4-yard touchdown pass to wide receiver Cole Beasley to give the Cowboys a 48–41 lead with 7:19 remaining in the fourth quarter. Manning subsequently led the Broncos on a 9-play, 73-yard drive, which culminated with running back Knowshon Moreno rushing for a 1-yard touchdown to tie the game at 48–48 with 2:24 remaining in the fourth quarter. Two plays into the Cowboys' next possession, as the Cowboys were attempting a game-winning drive, Romo was intercepted by Broncos' linebacker Danny Trevathan at the Cowboys' 24-yard line just before the two-minute warning. On the fourth play of the Broncos' final possession, the Broncos were facing a 3rd-and-1 at the Cowboys' 2-yard line, after the Cowboys had exhausted two of their three team timeouts. Moreno earned a crucial first down after Manning implored him to go down before reaching the goal line instead of scoring a touchdown, which forced the Cowboys to burn their final timeout with 1:35 remaining in the fourth quarter. After three kneel-downs by Manning, Prater nailed the game-winning 28-yard field goal as time expired.

Notes

This was the only game during the 2013 season in which the Broncos wore their alternate navy blue jerseys.

==== Week 6: vs. Jacksonville Jaguars ====
Week Six: Jacksonville Jaguars at Denver Broncos – Game summary

Quarter	1	2	3	4	Total
Jaguars	0	12	7	0	**19**
**Broncos**	14	0	14	7	**35**

at Sports Authority Field at Mile High, Denver, Colorado

- Date: October 13
- Game time: 2:05 pm. MDT
- Game weather: 59 °F (15 °C), partly cloudy
- Game attendance: 76,862
- Referee: Jeff Triplette
- TV announcers (CBS): Ian Eagle, Dan Fouts and Shannon Sharpe
- Recap, Gamebook

Game information

**First quarter**

- DEN – Julius Thomas 3-yard pass from Peyton Manning (Matt Prater kick), 12:09. Broncos 7–0. **Drive: 6 plays, 27 yards, 2:02.**
- DEN – Wes Welker 20-yard pass from Peyton Manning (Matt Prater kick), 2:44. Broncos 14–0. **Drive: 12 plays, 95 yards, 6:08.**

**Second quarter**

- JAX – Josh Scobee 50-yard field goal, 13:18. Broncos 14–3. **Drive: 10 plays, 48 yards, 4:26.**
- JAX – Josh Scobee 30-yard field goal, 5:43. Broncos 14–6. **Drive: 8 plays, 28 yards, 2:20.**
- JAX – Paul Posluszny 59-yard interception return (pass failed), 0:36. Broncos 14–12.

**Third quarter**

- DEN – Knowshon Moreno 1-yard run (Matt Prater kick), 12:16. Broncos 21–12. **Drive: 8 plays, 80 yards, 2:44.**
- JAX – Maurice Jones-Drew 5-yard run (Josh Scobee kick), 7:43. Broncos 21–19. **Drive: 9 plays, 80 yards, 4:33.**
- DEN – Knowshon Moreno 8-yard run (Matt Prater kick), 4:02. Broncos 28–19. **Drive: 8 plays, 80 yards, 3:41.**

**Fourth quarter**

- DEN – Knowshon Moreno 3-yard run (Matt Prater kick), 9:09. Broncos 35–19. **Drive: 5 plays, 41 yards, 2:19.**

**Top passers**

- JAX – Chad Henne – 27/42, 303 yards, 2 INT
- DEN – Peyton Manning – 28/42, 295 yards, 2 TD, INT

**Top rushers**

- JAX – Maurice Jones-Drew – 21 rushes, 71 yards, TD
- DEN – Knowshon Moreno – 15 rushes, 42 yards, 3 TD

**Top receivers**

- JAX – Justin Blackmon – 14 receptions, 190 yards
- DEN – Demaryius Thomas – 3 receptions, 78 yards

Coming off their comeback win over the Cowboys, the Broncos returned home for an AFC match against the Jacksonville Jaguars. The Broncos entered the game as the largest favorites (27 points) in NFL history. The Broncos started their dominance by jumping out to a 14–0 lead in the first quarter, with quarterback Peyton Manning throwing a pair of touchdown passes – a 3-yarder to tight end Julius Thomas and a 20-yarder to wide receiver Wes Welker. The Jaguars outscored the Broncos 12–0 in the second quarter, with a pair of field goals from placekicker Josh Scobee – from 50 and 30 yards out, followed by linebacker Paul Posluszny returning a Manning interception 59 yards for a touchdown (with an unsuccessful two-point attempt). On the opening drive of the third quarter, Broncos' running back Knowshon Moreno rushed for a 1-yard touchdown, however, the Jaguars had a response, with running back Maurice Jones-Drew rushing for a 5-yard touchdown to pull to within 21–19 midway through the third quarter. The Broncos subsequently added to their lead, with Moreno rushing for a pair of touchdowns – an 8-yarder followed by a 3-yarder at the 9:09 mark of the fourth quarter, the latter of which was the final scoring play of the game. The Jaguars attempted a rally, but the Broncos' defense stood their ground on the Jaguars' final two offensive possessions.

==== Week 7: at Indianapolis Colts ====
Week Seven: Denver Broncos at Indianapolis Colts – Game summary

Quarter	1	2	3	4	Total
Broncos	7	7	3	16	**33**
**Colts**	10	16	7	6	**39**

at Lucas Oil Stadium, Indianapolis, Indiana

- Date: October 20
- Game time: 8:30 pm. EDT/6:30 pm. MDT
- Game weather: 57 °F (14 °C), clear – retractable roof open
- Game attendance: 67,196
- Referee: Carl Cheffers
- TV announcers (NBC): Al Michaels, Cris Collinsworth and Michele Tafoya
- Recap, Gamebook

Game information

**First quarter**

- DEN – Eric Decker 17-yard pass from Peyton Manning (Matt Prater kick), 8:16. Broncos 7–0. **Drive: 2 plays, 56 yards, 0:46.**
- IND – Adam Vinatieri 27-yard field goal, 4:05. Broncos 7–3. **Drive: 10 plays, 65 yards, 4:11.**
- IND – Darrius Heyward-Bey 11-yard pass from Andrew Luck (Adam Vinatieri kick), 1:20. Colts 10–7. **Drive: 1 play, 11 yards, 0:07.**

**Second quarter**

- DEN – Julius Thomas 12-yard pass from Peyton Manning (Matt Prater kick), 11:56. Broncos 14–10. **Drive: 8 plays, 51 yards, 4:24.**
- IND – Peyton Manning fumble forced by Robert Mathis out of the end zone for a safety, 8:52. Broncos 14–12.
- IND – Stanley Havili 20-yard pass from Andrew Luck (Adam Vinatieri kick), 5:50. Colts 19–14. **Drive: 7 plays, 66 yards, 3:02.**
- IND – Coby Fleener 8-yard pass from Andrew Luck (Adam Vinatieri kick), 0:10. Colts 26–14. **Drive: 6 plays, 50 yards, 1:25.**

**Third quarter**

- IND – Andrew Luck 10-yard run (Adam Vinatieri kick), 5:00. Colts 33–14. **Drive: 4 plays, 41 yards, 1:49.**
- DEN – Matt Prater 31-yard field goal, 0:42. Colts 33–17. **Drive: 10 plays, 67 yards, 4:18.**

**Fourth quarter**

- IND – Adam Vinatieri 52-yard field goal, 12:59. Colts 36–17. **Drive: 7 plays, 46 yards, 2:43.**
- DEN – Demaryius Thomas 31-yard pass from Peyton Manning (pass failed), 12:11. Colts 36–23. **Drive: 3 plays, 80 yards, 0:48.**
- DEN – Knowshon Moreno 1-yard run (Matt Prater kick), 8:44. Colts 36–30. **Drive: 8 plays, 23 yards, 2:42.**
- IND – Adam Vinatieri 42-yard field goal, 5:57. Colts 39–30. **Drive: 4 plays, −3 yards, 1:02.**
- DEN – Matt Prater 47-yard field goal, 0:12. Colts 39–33. **Drive: 7 plays, 33 yards, 1:16.**

**Top passers**

- DEN – Peyton Manning – 29/49, 386 yards, 3 TD, INT
- IND – Andrew Luck – 21/38, 228 yards, 3 TD

**Top rushers**

- DEN – Knowshon Moreno – 15 rushes, 40 yards, TD
- IND – Trent Richardson – 14 rushes, 37 yards

**Top receivers**

- DEN – Eric Decker – 8 receptions, 150 yards, TD
- IND – Reggie Wayne – 5 receptions, 50 yards

Coming off their win over the Jaguars, the Broncos traveled to Lucas Oil Stadium for an AFC duel with the Indianapolis Colts. The Broncos grabbed the early lead in the first quarter, with quarterback Peyton Manning connecting with wide receiver Eric Decker on a 17-yard touchdown pass. The Colts responded, with a 27-yard field goal by placekicker Adam Vinatieri. Following a fumble by Broncos' return specialist Trindon Holliday on a punt return, the Colts grabbed the lead, with quarterback Andrew Luck completing an 11-yard touchdown pass to wide receiver Darrius Heyward-Bey. The Broncos re-claimed the lead in the second quarter, with Manning throwing a 12-yard touchdown pass to tight end Julius Thomas. On the Broncos next possession, Colts' linebacker Robert Mathis forced a fumble off Manning out of the end zone, resulting in a safety. The Colts subsequently re-claimed the lead, with Luck connecting on a 20-yard touchdown pass to fullback Stanley Havili, then added to their lead, with an 8-yard touchdown pass from Luck to tight end Coby Fleener just before halftime.

The Broncos' offense went three-and-out on their first three possessions of the third quarter, and the Colts took a 33–14 lead, with Luck rushing for a 10-yard touchdown. Late in the third quarter, the Broncos tried to cut into the Colts lead, with a 31-yard field goal by placekicker Matt Prater, but the Colts responded early in the fourth quarter, with a 52-yard field goal by Vinatieri. Trailing 36–17, the Broncos attempted a rally, with Manning connecting on a 31-yard touchdown pass to wide receiver Demaryius Thomas (with a failed two-point conversion attempt), followed by a 1-yard touchdown run by running back Knowshon Moreno. The latter score occurred after Broncos' safety Duke Ihenacho forced a fumble off Colts' running back Trent Richardson deep in Colts' territory. The Broncos' defense forced a punt on the Colts next possession. However, with 7:07 remaining in the fourth quarter, Manning's arm was hit by Colts' linebacker Erik Walden, and his pass was subsequently intercepted by linebacker Pat Angerer deep in Broncos' territory. Four plays later, a Vinatieri 42-yard field goal gave the Colts a 39–30 lead with 6:06 remaining. Eight plays into the Broncos' next possession, running back Ronnie Hillman lost a fumble at the Colts' 3-yard line at the 3:15 mark of the fourth quarter, just as the Broncos were attempting to narrow the Colts' lead. The Colts' offense subsequently ran time off the clock, forcing the Broncos to burn all three of their team timeouts. The Broncos tried a desperation rally with 1:28 remaining, with Prater nailing a 47-yard field goal with only 17 seconds remaining. However, the ensuing onside kick was unsuccessful, sealing the win for the Colts.

Notes

With the loss, the Broncos' 17-game regular season winning streak was snapped. This marked Peyton Manning's first visit to Indianapolis since he was released by the Colts in March 2012. Manning was the Colts' starting quarterback from 1998 to 2010, before missing the entire 2011 season due to multiple neck surgeries.

==== Week 8: vs. Washington Redskins ====
Week Eight: Washington Redskins at Denver Broncos – Game summary

Quarter	1	2	3	4	Total
Redskins	0	7	14	0	**21**
**Broncos**	7	0	7	31	**45**

at Sports Authority Field at Mile High, Denver, Colorado

- Date: October 27
- Game time: 2:25 pm. MDT
- Game weather: 69 °F (21 °C), mostly sunny
- Game attendance: 77,031
- Referee: Ron Winter
- TV announcers (Fox): Thom Brennaman, Troy Aikman and Pam Oliver
- Recap, Gamebook

Game information

**First quarter**

- DEN – Wes Welker 6-yard pass from Peyton Manning (Matt Prater kick), 10:02. Broncos 7–0. **Drive: 9 plays, 77 yards, 3:40.**

**Second quarter**

- WAS – Leonard Hankerson 7-yard pass from Robert Griffin III (Kai Forbath kick), 0:19. Tied 7–7. **Drive: 16 plays, 95 yards, 7:03.**

**Third quarter**

- WAS – Alfred Morris 1-yard run (Kai Forbath kick), 11:34. Redskins 14–7. **Drive: 3 plays, 19 yards, 1:22.**
- WAS – DeAngelo Hall 26-yard interception return (Kai Forbath kick), 11:25. Redskins 21–7.
- DEN – Montee Ball 4-yard run (Matt Prater kick), 7:48. Redskins 21–14. **Drive: 11 plays, 75 yards, 3:37.**

**Fourth quarter**

- DEN – Joel Dreessen 1-yard pass from Peyton Manning (Matt Prater kick), 14:56. Tied 21–21. **Drive: 16 plays, 83 yards, 4:59.**
- DEN – Knowshon Moreno 35-yard pass from Peyton Manning (Matt Prater kick), 14:19. Broncos 28–21. **Drive: 1 play, 35 yards, 0:10.**
- DEN – Matt Prater 19-yard field goal, 11:14. Broncos 31–21. **Drive: 5 plays, 23 yards, 2:01.**
- DEN – Demaryius Thomas 35-yard pass from Peyton Manning (Matt Prater kick), 6:35. Broncos 38–21. **Drive: 2 plays, 25 yards, 0:34.**
- DEN – Dominique Rodgers-Cromartie 75-yard interception return (Matt Prater kick), 2:07. Broncos 45–21.

**Top passers**

- WAS – Robert Griffin III – 15/30, 132 yards, TD, 2 INT
- DEN – Peyton Manning – 30/44, 354 yards, 4 TD, 3 INT

**Top rushers**

- WAS – Alfred Morris – 17 rushes, 93 yards, TD
- DEN – Knowshon Moreno – 14 rushes, 44 yards

**Top receivers**

- WAS – Jordan Reed – 8 receptions, 90 yards
- DEN – Knowshon Moreno – 6 receptions, 89 yards, TD

Hoping to recover from their first loss of the season at Indianapolis, the Broncos returned home for an interconference match against the Washington Redskins. A 6-yard touchdown pass from quarterback Peyton Manning to wide receiver Wes Welker gave the Broncos the early lead. The Redskins tied the game just before halftime, with quarterback Robert Griffin III connecting on a 7-yard touchdown pass to wide receiver Leonard Hankerson. Early in the third quarter, the Redskins grabbed a 21–7 lead, with two touchdowns in only 19 seconds – both off Manning turnovers. Following a Manning fumble, Redskins' running back Alfred Morris rushed for a 1-yard touchdown. On the first play of the Broncos' next possession, Manning was intercepted by cornerback DeAngelo Hall, who returned the football 26 yards for a touchdown. However, the Broncos scored the final 38 points of the game. Midway through the third quarter, running back Montee Ball rushed for a 4-yard touchdown. At the beginning of the fourth quarter, Manning connected on a 1-yard touchdown pass to tight end Joel Dreessen to tie the game at 21–21. The Redskins' offense went three-and-out on their next possession, and after punter Sav Rocca shanked a punt to the Redskins' 35-yard line, the Broncos immediately grabbed the lead on the first play of their next possession, with Manning throwing a 35-yard touchdown pass to running back Knowshon Moreno on a screen play. On the Redskins' next possession, Broncos' linebacker Von Miller forced a fumble off RGIII deep in Redskins' territory, though the Broncos had to settle on a 19-yard field goal by placekicker Matt Prater. Midway through the fourth quarter, Manning threw his fourth touchdown pass of the game – a 35-yarder to wide receiver Demaryius Thomas. The final scoring play of the game came courtesy of cornerback Dominique Rodgers-Cromartie returning an interception off Redskins' quarterback Kirk Cousins 75 yards for a touchdown.

Notes

This was Redskins' head coach Mike Shanahan's first visit to Denver since being fired by the Broncos after the 2008 season. Shanahan, who coached the Broncos from 1995 to 2008, is the winningest head coach in Broncos' franchise history, with 146 wins. This was the Broncos' final home game against Washington under the "Redskins" moniker, as Washington adopted a temporary moniker in 2020.

==== Week 10: at San Diego Chargers ====
Week Ten: Denver Broncos at San Diego Chargers – Game summary

Quarter	1	2	3	4	Total
**Broncos**	7	14	7	0	**28**
Chargers	0	6	7	7	**20**

at Qualcomm Stadium, San Diego, California

- Date: November 10
- Game time: 2:25 pm. MST/1:25 p.m. PST
- Game weather: 78 °F (26 °C), sunny
- Game attendance: 68,847
- Referee: Tony Corrente
- TV announcers (CBS): Jim Nantz and Phil Simms
- Recap, Gamebook

Game information

**First quarter**

- DEN – Julius Thomas 74-yard pass from Peyton Manning (Matt Prater kick), 9:18. Broncos 7–0. **Drive: 3 plays, 85 yards, 0:57.**

**Second quarter**

- SD – Nick Novak 26-yard field goal, 14:58. Broncos 7–3. **Drive: 14 plays, 72 yards, 9:20.**
- SD – Nick Novak 40-yard field goal, 9:05. Broncos 7–6. **Drive: 5 plays, 37 yards, 1:59.**
- DEN – Demaryius Thomas 11-yard pass from Peyton Manning (Matt Prater kick), 6:38. Broncos 14–6. **Drive: 7 plays, 80 yards, 2:27.**
- DEN – Demaryius Thomas 7-yard pass from Peyton Manning (Matt Prater kick), 0:13. Broncos 21–6. **Drive: 9 plays, 73 yards, 1:25.**

**Third quarter**

- DEN – Demaryius Thomas 34-yard pass from Peyton Manning (Matt Prater kick), 11:34. Broncos 28–6. **Drive: 8 plays, 78 yards, 3:26.**
- SD – Danny Woodhead 7-yard pass from Philip Rivers (Nick Novak kick), 8:38. Broncos 28–13. **Drive: 2 plays, 11 yards, 0:52.**

**Fourth quarter**

- SD – Ryan Mathews 1-yard run (Nick Novak kick), 10:42. Broncos 28–20. **Drive: 9 plays, 60 yards, 4:47.**

**Top passers**

- DEN – Peyton Manning – 25/36, 330 yards, 4 TD
- SD – Philip Rivers – 19/29, 218 yards, TD

**Top rushers**

- DEN – Knowshon Moreno – 15 rushes, 65 yards
- SD – Ryan Mathews – 14 rushes, 59 yards, TD

**Top receivers**

- DEN – Demaryius Thomas – 7 receptions, 108 yards, 3 TD
- SD – Antonio Gates – 4 receptions, 62 yards

Coming off their win over the Redskins and subsequent bye week, the Broncos traveled to Qualcomm Stadium for an AFC West duel with the San Diego Chargers. A 74-yard touchdown pass from quarterback Peyton Manning to tight end Julius Thomas in the first quarter gave the Broncos the early lead. Two second-quarter field goals by Chargers' placekicker Nick Novak – from 26 and 40 yards out – narrowed the Broncos lead. However, the Broncos struck back, with Manning connecting on three touchdown passes to wide receiver Demaryius Thomas – an 11-yarder, a 7-yarder just before halftime and a 34-yarder on the opening possession of the second half, which increased the Broncos' lead to 28–6. On the Broncos' next possession, Chargers' linebacker Tourek Williams forced a fumble off Manning deep in Broncos' territory, and the Chargers immediately capitalized two plays later, with quarterback Philip Rivers throwing a 7-yard touchdown pass to running back Danny Woodhead. The Chargers further narrowed the Broncos' lead early in the fourth quarter, with running back Ryan Mathews rushing for a 1-yard touchdown to pull to within 28–20 with 10:44 remaining in the fourth quarter. The Chargers' defense forced a punt on the Broncos' next possession, and with 6:43 left in the game, the Chargers tried to rally, however, the Broncos' defense forced a Chargers' punt with 3:37 remaining, and the Broncos' offense subsequently ran out the clock.

==== Week 11: vs. Kansas City Chiefs ====
Week Eleven: Kansas City Chiefs at Denver Broncos – Game summary

Quarter	1	2	3	4	Total
Chiefs	0	10	0	7	**17**
**Broncos**	10	7	7	3	**27**

at Sports Authority Field at Mile High, Denver, Colorado

- Date: November 17
- Game time: 6:30 pm. MST
- Game weather: 43 °F (6 °C), clear
- Game attendance: 77,076
- Referee: John Parry
- TV announcers (NBC): Al Michaels, Cris Collinsworth and Michele Tafoya
- Recap, Gamebook

Game information

**First quarter**

- DEN – Matt Prater 54-yard field goal, 12:33. Broncos 3–0. **Drive: 7 plays, 17 yards, 1:31.**
- DEN – Julius Thomas 9-yard pass from Peyton Manning (Matt Prater kick), 3:03. Broncos 10–0. **Drive: 5 plays, 84 yards, 2:25.**

**Second quarter**

- KC – Dwayne Bowe 6-yard pass from Alex Smith (Ryan Succop kick), 13:23. Broncos 10–7. **Drive: 11 plays, 80 yards, 4:40.**
- DEN – Montee Ball 1-yard run (Matt Prater kick), 9:05. Broncos 17–7. **Drive: 10 plays, 79 yards, 4:18.**
- KC – Ryan Succop 20-yard field goal, 2:55. Broncos 17–10. **Drive: 12 plays, 79 yards, 6:10.**

**Third quarter**

- DEN – Montee Ball 8-yard run (Matt Prater kick), 2:22. Broncos 24–10. **Drive: 6 plays, 65 yards, 3:02.**

**Fourth quarter**

- DEN – Matt Prater 36-yard field goal, 7:06. Broncos 27–10. **Drive: 10 plays, 62 yards, 4:42.**
- KC – Anthony Fasano 10-yard pass from Alex Smith (Ryan Succop kick), 4:56. Broncos 27–17. **Drive: 9 plays, 80 yards, 2:10.**

**Top passers**

- KC – Alex Smith – 21/45, 230 yards, 2 TD
- DEN – Peyton Manning – 24/40, 323 yards, TD

**Top rushers**

- KC – Jamaal Charles – 16 rushes, 78 yards
- DEN – Knowshon Moreno – 27 rushes, 79 yards

**Top receivers**

- KC – Dwayne Bowe – 4 receptions, 57 yards, TD
- DEN – Demaryius Thomas – 5 receptions, 121 yards

Coming off their win over the Chargers, the Broncos returned home for an AFC West duel with the 9–0 Kansas City Chiefs. The Broncos jumped out to a 10–0 lead in the first quarter, with a 54-yard field goal by placekicker Matt Prater, followed by a 9-yard touchdown pass from quarterback Peyton Manning to tight end Julius Thomas. The Chiefs got on the scoreboard early in the second quarter, with a 6-yard touchdown pass from quarterback Alex Smith to wide receiver Dwayne Bowe. The Broncos immediately responded, with running back Montee Ball rushing for a 1-yard touchdown. The Chiefs pulled to within 17–10, with a 20-yard field goal by placekicker Ryan Succop. The Broncos added to their lead late in the third quarter, with an 8-yard touchdown run by Ball, followed by a 36-yard field goal by Prater midway through the fourth quarter. The Chiefs tried to rally, with Smith connecting on a 10-yard touchdown pass to tight end Anthony Fasano, and forced a Broncos' punt with one minute remaining in the game, but the Broncos' defense stood their ground to hand the Chiefs their first loss of the season.

==== Week 12: at New England Patriots ====
Week Twelve: Denver Broncos at New England Patriots – Game summary

Quarter	1	2	3	4	OT	Total
Broncos	17	7	0	7	0	**31**
**Patriots**	0	0	21	10	3	**34**

at Gillette Stadium, Foxborough, Massachusetts

- Date: November 24
- Game time: 8:30 pm. EST/6:30 pm. MST
- Game weather: 22 °F (−6 °C), clear, windy and cold
- Game attendance: 68,756
- Referee: Gene Steratore
- TV announcers (NBC): Al Michaels, Cris Collinsworth and Michele Tafoya
- Recap, Gamebook

Game information

**First quarter**

- DEN – Von Miller 60-yard fumble return (Matt Prater kick), 9:54. Broncos 7–0.
- DEN – Knowshon Moreno 2-yard run (Matt Prater kick), 8:54. Broncos 14–0. **Drive: 2 plays, 10 yards, 0:28.**
- DEN – Matt Prater 27-yard field goal, 2:57. Broncos 17–0. **Drive: 10 plays, 35 yards, 4:29.**

**Second quarter**

- DEN – Jacob Tamme 10-yard pass from Peyton Manning (Matt Prater kick), 6:10. Broncos 24–0. **Drive: 11 plays, 70 yards, 4:28.**

**Third quarter**

- NE – Julian Edelman 5-yard pass from Tom Brady (Stephen Gostkowski kick), 11:21. Broncos 24–7. **Drive: 8 plays, 80 yards, 3:39.**
- NE – Brandon Bolden 1-yard run (Stephen Gostkowski kick), 5:40. Broncos 24–14. **Drive: 6 plays, 32 yards, 2:39.**
- NE – Rob Gronkowski 6-yard pass from Tom Brady (Stephen Gostkowski kick), 0:19. Broncos 24–21. **Drive: 5 plays, 65 yards, 1:42.**

**Fourth quarter**

- NE – Julian Edelman 14-yard pass from Tom Brady (Stephen Gostkowski kick), 13:13. Patriots 28–24. **Drive: 3 plays, 30 yards, 1:19.**
- NE – Stephen Gostkowski 31-yard field goal, 7:37. Patriots 31–24. **Drive: 12 plays, 34 yards, 4:45.**
- DEN – Demaryius Thomas 11-yard pass from Peyton Manning (Matt Prater kick), 3:06. Tied 31–31. **Drive: 10 plays, 80 yards, 4:31.**

**Overtime**

- NE – Stephen Gostkowski 31-yard field goal, 1:56. Patriots 34–31. **Drive: 3 plays, 0 yards, 1:05.**

**Top passers**

- DEN – Peyton Manning – 19/36, 150 yards, 2 TD, INT
- NE – Tom Brady – 34/50, 344 yards, 3 TD

**Top rushers**

- DEN – Knowshon Moreno – 37 rushes, 224 yards, TD
- NE – Brandon Bolden – 13 rushes, 58 yards, TD

**Top receivers**

- DEN – Jacob Tamme – 5 receptions, 47 yards, TD
- NE – Julian Edelman – 9 receptions, 110 yards, 2 TD

Coming off their win over the Chiefs, the Broncos traveled to Foxborough, Massachusetts to face the New England Patriots at Gillette Stadium. This was the 14th meeting between quarterbacks Peyton Manning and Tom Brady since 2001. The Broncos jumped out to a 17–0 lead in the first quarter off three Patriots' turnovers. First, linebacker Von Miller returned a fumble 60 yards for a touchdown. Then, after another Patriots' fumble, running back Knowshon Moreno rushed for a 2-yard touchdown. Placekicker Matt Prater added a 27-yard field goal after yet another Patriots' fumble. The Broncos increased their lead to 24–0 midway through the second quarter, with Manning connecting on a 10-yard touchdown pass to tight end Jacob Tamme.

The Patriots then reeled off 31 unanswered points, 14 of which came off two Broncos' turnovers. The Patriots took the opening possession of the second half and got on the scoreboard, with Brady connecting on a 5-yard touchdown pass to wide receiver Julian Edelman. Following a fumble by Broncos' running back Montee Ball, the Patriots scored again, with running back Brandon Bolden rushing for a 1-yard touchdown. After forcing a Broncos' punt, the Patriots pulled to within 24–21 near the end of the third quarter, with Brady throwing a 6-yard touchdown pass to tight end Rob Gronkowski. On the second play of the Broncos' next possession, Manning was intercepted by Patriots' cornerback Logan Ryan early in the fourth quarter, and three plays later, Brady connected on another touchdown pass to Edelman – from 14 yards out – to give the Patriots a 28–24 lead. The Broncos went three-and-out on their next offensive possession, and the Patriots subsequently added to their lead, with a 31-yard field goal by placekicker Stephen Gostkowski midway through the fourth quarter. The Broncos snapped the Patriots' streak of 31 unanswered points and tied the game on their next possession, with a 10-play, 80-yard drive, culminating with an 11-yard touchdown pass from Manning to wide receiver Demaryius Thomas, sending the game to overtime.

Each team traded punts on their first two overtime possessions, and after the Patriots' second punt, Broncos' cornerback Tony Carter inadvertently made contact with the football as he was trying to get out of the way of a bouncing punt, with Patriots' safety Nate Ebner recovering the fumble at the Broncos' 13-yard line. Three plays later, Gostkowski nailed the game-winning 30-yard field goal with 1:56 remaining in overtime.

Notes

This marked wide receiver Wes Welker's first visit to New England, where he was a standout Pro Bowler with the team from 2007 to 2012. Tom Brady improved his head-to-head record against Peyton Manning to 10–4, while Manning suffered his 14th career loss in 21 starts against the Patriots.

==== Week 13: at Kansas City Chiefs ====
Week Thirteen: Denver Broncos at Kansas City Chiefs – Game summary

Quarter	1	2	3	4	Total
**Broncos**	0	14	14	7	**35**
Chiefs	7	14	0	7	**28**

at Arrowhead Stadium, Kansas City, Missouri

- Date: December 1
- Game time: 3:25 pm. CST/2:25 pm. MST
- Game weather: 55 °F (13 °C), sunny and clear
- Game attendance: 77,065
- Referee: Terry McAulay
- TV announcers (CBS): Jim Nantz and Phil Simms
- Recap, Gamebook

Game information

**First quarter**

- KC – Junior Hemingway 17-yard pass from Alex Smith (Ryan Succop kick), 2:41. Chiefs 7–0. **Drive: 7 plays, 83 yards, 4:10.**

**Second quarter**

- DEN – Eric Decker 41-yard pass from Peyton Manning (Matt Prater kick), 14:53. Tied 7–7. **Drive: 6 plays, 79 yards, 2:48.**
- KC – Knile Davis 108-yard kickoff return (Ryan Succop kick), 14:40. Chiefs 14–7. **Drive: 0 plays, 0 yards, 0:13.**
- KC – Anthony Fasano 12-yard pass from Alex Smith (Ryan Succop kick), 10:57. Chiefs 21–7. **Drive: 5 plays, 22 yards, 2:12.**
- DEN – Knowshon Moreno 3-yard pass from Peyton Manning (Matt Prater kick), 4:16. Chiefs 21–14. **Drive: 9 plays, 70 yards, 3:18.**

**Third quarter**

- DEN – Eric Decker 37-yard pass from Peyton Manning (Matt Prater kick), 11:51. Tied 21–21. **Drive: 7 plays, 80 yards, 3:09.**
- DEN – Eric Decker 15-yard pass from Peyton Manning (Matt Prater kick), 6:48. Broncos 28–21. **Drive: 5 plays, 92 yards, 2:08.**

**Fourth quarter**

- DEN – Eric Decker 1-yard pass from Peyton Manning (Matt Prater kick), 14:16. Broncos 35–21. **Drive: 10 plays, 95 yards, 5:45.**
- KC – Jamaal Charles 1-yard run (Ryan Succop kick), 6:32. Broncos 35–28. **Drive: 17 plays, 80 yards, 7:44.**

**Top passers**

- DEN – Peyton Manning – 22/35, 403 yards, 5 TD, 2 INT
- KC – Alex Smith – 26/42, 293 yards, 2 TD, INT

**Top rushers**

- DEN – Montee Ball – 13 rushes, 117 yards
- KC – Jamaal Charles – 19 rushes, 93 yards, TD

**Top receivers**

- DEN – Eric Decker – 8 receptions, 174 yards, 4 TD
- KC – Dwayne Bowe – 3 receptions, 56 yards

Hoping to rebound from their overtime loss to the Patriots, the Broncos traveled to Arrowhead Stadium for an AFC West rematch with the Kansas City Chiefs. The Broncos and Chiefs entered the game tied for the AFC West division lead, both with 9–2 records. The Chiefs grabbed the lead late in the first quarter, with quarterback Alex Smith throwing a 17-yard touchdown pass to wide receiver Junior Hemingway. The Broncos responded at the beginning of the second quarter, with quarterback Peyton Manning throwing a 41-yard touchdown pass to wide receiver Eric Decker. However, Chiefs' running back Knile Davis returned the ensuing kickoff 108 yards for a touchdown and following a Manning interception on the Broncos' next possession, Smith connected with tight end Anthony Fasano on a 12-yard touchdown pass to give the Chiefs a 21–7 lead. The Broncos then reeled off 28 unanswered points, beginning with a 3-yard touchdown pass from Manning to running back Knowshon Moreno. Manning then connected with Decker on three more touchdown passes – a 37-yarder and a 15-yarder in the third quarter, followed by a 1-yarder early in the fourth quarter. A 1-yard touchdown run by Chiefs' running back Jamaal Charles narrowed the Broncos' lead to 35–28 with 6:32 remaining in the fourth quarter, and the Chiefs' defense forced a punt on the Broncos' next possession. The Chiefs' offense had one last possession with 3:32 remaining in the fourth quarter, and Smith drove the Chiefs to as far as the Broncos' 13-yard line with 1:51 remaining. However, Broncos' safety Mike Adams deflected a fourth-down pass from Smith that was intended for wide receiver Dwayne Bowe near the goal line, and the Broncos subsequently ran out the clock.

Notes

With the win, the Broncos swept the Chiefs for a second consecutive season.

==== Week 14: vs. Tennessee Titans ====
Week Fourteen: Tennessee Titans at Denver Broncos – Game summary

Quarter	1	2	3	4	Total
Titans	14	7	7	0	**28**
**Broncos**	10	10	14	17	**51**

at Sports Authority Field at Mile High, Denver, Colorado

- Date: December 8
- Game time: 2:05 pm. MST
- Game weather: 18 °F (−8 °C), mostly sunny
- Game attendance: 76,554
- Referee: Scott Green
- TV announcers (CBS): Jim Nantz and Phil Simms
- Recap, Gamebook

Game information

**First quarter**

- TEN – Shonn Greene 1-yard run (Rob Bironas kick), 12:37. Titans 7–0. **Drive: 5 plays, 73 yards, 2:23.**
- DEN – Wes Welker 1-yard pass from Peyton Manning (Matt Prater kick), 7:28. Tied 7–7. **Drive: 13 plays, 74 yards, 5:09.**
- TEN – Chris Johnson 3-yard run (Rob Bironas kick), 7:01. Titans 14–7. **Drive: 1 play, 3 yards, 0:27.**
- DEN – Matt Prater 25-yard field goal, 0:25. Titans 14–10. **Drive: 9 plays, 51 yards, 2:24.**

**Second quarter**

- TEN – Shonn Greene 28-yard run (Rob Bironas kick), 6:58. Titans 21–10. **Drive: 8 plays, 89 yards, 3:38.**
- DEN – Julius Thomas 8-yard pass from Peyton Manning (Matt Prater kick), 1:50. Titans 21–17. **Drive: 10 plays, 81 yards, 5:08.**
- DEN – Matt Prater 64-yard field goal, 0:00. Titans 21–20. **Drive: 8 plays, 39 yards, 0:52.**

**Third quarter**

- DEN – Demaryius Thomas 4-yard pass from Peyton Manning (Matt Prater kick), 11:52. Broncos 27–21. **Drive: 6 plays, 80 yards, 3:08.**
- DEN – Knowshon Moreno 1-yard run (Matt Prater kick), 7:34. Broncos 34–21. **Drive: 8 plays, 43 yards, 2:56.**
- TEN – Justin Hunter 41-yard pass from Ryan Fitzpatrick (Rob Bironas kick), 4:50. Broncos 34–28. **Drive: 6 plays, 80 yards, 2:44.**

**Fourth quarter**

- DEN – Matt Prater 19-yard field goal, 13:15. Broncos 37–28. **Drive: 13 plays, 79 yards, 6:35.**
- DEN – Eric Decker 20-yard pass from Peyton Manning (Matt Prater kick), 9:12. Broncos 44–28. **Drive: 3 plays, 32 yards, 0:35.**
- DEN – Montee Ball 5-yard run (Matt Prater kick), 3:07. Broncos 51–28. **Drive: 10 plays, 49 yards, 5:06.**

**Top passers**

- TEN – Ryan Fitzpatrick – 13/24, 172 yards, TD, INT
- DEN – Peyton Manning – 39/59, 397 yards, 4 TD

**Top rushers**

- TEN – Shonn Greene – 9 rushes, 46 yards, 2 TD
- DEN – Knowshon Moreno – 14 rushes, 78 yards, TD

**Top receivers**

- TEN – Justin Hunter – 4 receptions, 114 yards, TD
- DEN – Eric Decker – 8 receptions, 117 yards, TD

Coming off their win over the Chiefs, the Broncos returned home for an AFC duel with the Tennessee Titans. The Titans struck first on their opening possession, with running back Shonn Greene rushing for a 1-yard touchdown. The Broncos responded, with quarterback Peyton Manning throwing a 1-yard touchdown pass to wide receiver Wes Welker. Titans' running back Leon Washington then returned the ensuing kickoff 95 yards to the Broncos' 3-yard line, and the Titans subsequently re-claimed the lead, with a 3-yard touchdown run by running back Chris Johnson. The Broncos narrowed the Titans' lead toward the end of the first quarter, with a 25-yard field goal by placekicker Matt Prater. Midway through the second quarter, Greene rushed for a 28-yard touchdown, which gave the Titans a 21–10 lead. Just after the two-minute warning, Manning connected with tight end Julius Thomas on an 8-yard touchdown pass, and just before halftime, Prater nailed an NFL-record 64-yard field goal. The Broncos claimed the lead on the opening possession of the second half, with Manning throwing a 4-yard touchdown pass to wide receiver Demaryius Thomas, then increased their lead, with running back Knowshon Moreno rushing for a 1-yard touchdown. The Titans tried to cut into the Broncos' lead, with quarterback Ryan Fitzpatrick connecting on a 41-yard touchdown pass to wide receiver Justin Hunter. However, the Broncos pulled away in the fourth quarter, with a 19-yard field goal by Prater, a 20-yard touchdown pass from Manning to wide receiver Eric Decker and a 5-yard touchdown run by running back Montee Ball.

Notes

With the win, the Broncos clinched a playoff berth.

==== Week 15: vs. San Diego Chargers ====
Week Fifteen: San Diego Chargers at Denver Broncos – Game summary

Quarter	1	2	3	4	Total
**Chargers**	3	14	7	3	**27**
Broncos	10	0	0	10	**20**

at Sports Authority Field at Mile High, Denver, Colorado

- Date: December 12
- Game time: 6:25 pm. MST
- Game weather: 37 °F (3 °C), mostly clear
- Game attendance: 76,497
- Referee: Bill Vinovich
- TV announcers (NFLN): Brad Nessler, Mike Mayock and Alex Flanagan
- Recap, Gamebook

Game information

**First quarter**

- DEN – Andre Caldwell 15-yard pass from Peyton Manning (Matt Prater kick), 11:51. Broncos 7–0. **Drive: 7 plays, 69 yards, 3:09.**
- SD – Nick Novak 38-yard field goal, 5:15. Broncos 7–3. **Drive: 11 plays, 60 yards, 6:36.**
- DEN – Matt Prater 32-yard field goal, 1:22. Broncos 10–3. **Drive: 9 plays, 60 yards, 3:53.**

**Second quarter**

- SD – Keenan Allen 19-yard pass from Philip Rivers (Nick Novak kick), 9:46. Tied 10–10. **Drive: 13 plays, 80 yards, 6:36.**
- SD – Keenan Allen 10-yard pass from Philip Rivers (Nick Novak kick), 1:05. Chargers 17–10. **Drive: 7 plays, 43 yards, 3:26.**

**Third quarter**

- SD – Ryan Mathews 23-yard run (Nick Novak kick), 11:06. Chargers 24–10. **Drive: 8 plays, 80 yards, 3:54.**

**Fourth quarter**

- DEN – Andre Caldwell 5-yard pass from Peyton Manning (Matt Prater kick), 10:25. Chargers 24–17. **Drive: 12 plays, 89 yards, 6:07.**
- SD – Nick Novak 35-yard field goal, 2:36. Chargers 27–17. **Drive: 6 plays, 16 yards, 2:31.**
- DEN – Matt Prater 42-yard field goal, 0:29. Chargers 27–20. **Drive: 11 plays, 56 yards, 2:07.**

**Top passers**

- SD – Philip Rivers – 12/20, 166 yards, 2 TD
- DEN – Peyton Manning – 27/41, 289 yards, 2 TD, INT

**Top rushers**

- SD – Ryan Mathews – 29 rushes, 127 yards, TD
- DEN – Knowshon Moreno – 8 rushes, 19 yards

**Top receivers**

- SD – Vincent Brown – 3 receptions, 54 yards
- DEN – Andre Caldwell – 6 receptions, 59 yards, 2 TD

Coming off their win over the Titans, the Broncos remained on home ground for an AFC West rematch with the San Diego Chargers on Thursday Night Football. A 15-yard touchdown pass from quarterback Peyton Manning to wide receiver Andre Caldwell gave the Broncos the early lead. The Chargers subsequently got on the board, with a 38-yard field goal by placekicker Nick Novak. The Broncos answered, with a 32-yard field goal by placekicker Matt Prater. However, the Chargers scored 21 unanswered points and dominated the time of possession, as the Broncos' offense went three-and-out on all three of their second quarter possessions. A 19-yard touchdown pass from quarterback Philip Rivers to wide receiver Keenan Allen tied the game, and the Chargers grabbed the lead late in the first half, with a 10-yard touchdown pass from Rivers to Allen. The Chargers took the opening possession of the second half and increased their lead, culminating with running back Ryan Mathews rushing for a 23-yard touchdown. The Broncos were forced to punt after only four plays on their initial possession of the second half, and the Chargers' ball control offense subsequently ate up over eight minutes of the third quarter, though the Broncos' defense forced a Chargers' punt. The Broncos cut into the Chargers' lead in the fourth quarter, with a 5-yard touchdown pass from Manning to Caldwell with 10:30 remaining in the game. After forcing a Chargers' punt, the Broncos offense got the football with 5:50 remaining, however, three plays later, Manning was intercepted by Chargers' linebacker Thomas Keiser at the Broncos' 39-yard line. Six plays later, a 35-yard field goal by Novak increased the Chargers' lead to 27–17 with 2:41 remaining. With no timeouts remaining (save the two-minute warning), the Broncos tried to rally, with Prater kicking a 42-yard field goal with only 34 seconds remaining. However, the Broncos' onside kick attempt was unsuccessful, sealing the win for the Chargers.

Notes

With the loss, the Broncos had their 13-game regular-season home winning streak snapped, as well as their 10-game winning streak against division opponents.

==== Week 16: at Houston Texans ====
Week Sixteen: Denver Broncos at Houston Texans – Game summary

Quarter	1	2	3	4	Total
**Broncos**	3	13	0	21	**37**
Texans	3	3	7	0	**13**

at Reliant Stadium, Houston, Texas

- Date: December 22
- Game time: 12:00 pm. CST/11:00 am. MST
- Game weather: 58 °F (14 °C), partly cloudy – retractable roof open
- Game attendance: 71,761
- Referee: Ed Hochuli
- TV announcers (CBS): Ian Eagle and Dan Fouts
- Recap, Gamebook

Game information

**First quarter**

- DEN – Matt Prater 32-yard field goal, 8:50. Broncos 3–0. **Drive: 12 plays, 78 yards, 4:38.**
- HOU – Randy Bullock 45-yard field goal, 2:02. Tied 3–3. **Drive: 7 plays, 47 yards, 3:04.**

**Second quarter**

- DEN – Demaryius Thomas 36-yard pass from Peyton Manning (Matt Prater kick), 14:54. Broncos 10–3. **Drive: 5 plays, 64 yards, 2:08.**
- HOU – Randy Bullock 35-yard field goal, 6:06. Broncos 10–6. **Drive: 7 plays, 10 yards, 3:45.**
- DEN – Matt Prater 25-yard field goal, 0:56. Broncos 13–6. **Drive: 13 plays, 69 yards, 5:10.**
- DEN – Matt Prater 44-yard field goal, 0:00. Broncos 16–6. **Drive: 4 plays, 43 yards, 0:26.**

**Third quarter**

- HOU – Keshawn Martin 15-yard pass from Matt Schaub (Randy Bullock kick), 10:33. Broncos 16–13. **Drive: 9 plays, 74 yards, 3:14.**

**Fourth quarter**

- DEN – Eric Decker 10-yard pass from Peyton Manning (Matt Prater kick), 13:26. Broncos 23–13. **Drive: 2 plays, 28 yards, 0:45.**
- DEN – Eric Decker 20-yard pass from Peyton Manning (Matt Prater kick), 6:57. Broncos 30–13. **Drive: 8 plays, 55 yards, 3:03.**
- DEN – Julius Thomas 25-yard pass from Peyton Manning (Matt Prater kick), 4:28. Broncos 37–13. **Drive: 3 plays, 56 yards, 0:48.**

**Top passers**

- DEN – Peyton Manning – 32/51, 400 yards, 4 TD
- HOU – Matt Schaub – 18/37, 176 yards, TD, 2 INT

**Top rushers**

- DEN – Knowshon Moreno – 11 rushes, 76 yards
- HOU – Deji Karim – 8 rushes, 30 yards

**Top receivers**

- DEN – Eric Decker – 10 receptions, 131 yards, 2 TD
- HOU – Ryan Griffin – 5 receptions, 66 yards

Hoping to rebound from their loss to the Chargers, the Broncos traveled to Reliant Stadium for an AFC match with the Houston Texans. The two teams traded field goals in the first quarter, with a 32-yarder by Broncos' placekicker Matt Prater and a 45-yarder by Texans' placekicker Randy Bullock. The Broncos grabbed the lead early in the second quarter, with a 36-yard touchdown pass from quarterback Peyton Manning to wide receiver Demaryius Thomas. A 35-yard field goal by Bullock narrowed the Broncos' lead, but the Broncos increased it with two field goals from Prater in the final minute of the first half – a 25-yarder and a 44-yarder. A 15-yard touchdown pass from Texans' quarterback Matt Schaub to wide receiver Keshawn Martin was the only scoring play of the third quarter, which narrowed the Broncos' lead to 16–13. After Broncos' safety Mike Adams intercepted Schaub early in the fourth quarter, the Broncos subsequently pulled away, with Manning throwing two touchdown passes to wide receiver Eric Decker – a 10-yarder and a 20-yarder. Later in the fourth quarter, Manning threw his 51st touchdown pass of the season – a 25-yarder to tight end Julius Thomas, in which Manning set a new NFL record for touchdown passes in a single season.

Notes

With the win, coupled with the Kansas City Chiefs' loss to the Indianapolis Colts, the Broncos clinched the AFC West division title. This was the 13th division title in the Broncos' franchise history, surpassing the Oakland Raiders for the all-time lead in AFC West championships since the 1970 AFL–NFL merger. It also marked the first time in franchise history that the Broncos clinched three consecutive AFC West division titles.

==== Week 17: at Oakland Raiders ====
Week Seventeen: Denver Broncos at Oakland Raiders – Game summary

Quarter	1	2	3	4	Total
**Broncos**	14	17	0	3	**34**
Raiders	0	0	0	14	**14**

at O.co Coliseum, Oakland, California

- Date: December 29
- Game time: 2:25 pm. MST/1:25 pm. PST
- Game weather: 70 °F (21 °C), sunny
- Game attendance: 51,500
- Referee: Ron Winter
- TV announcers (CBS): Kevin Harlan and Solomon Wilcots
- Recap, Gamebook

Game information

**First quarter**

- DEN – Eric Decker 3-yard pass from Peyton Manning (Matt Prater kick), 7:05. Broncos 7–0 **Drive: 12 plays, 71 yards, 5:54.**
- DEN – Knowshon Moreno 7-yard pass from Peyton Manning (Matt Prater kick), 5:39. Broncos 14–0. **Drive: 4 plays, 21 yards, 1:14.**

**Second quarter**

- DEN – Matt Prater 34-yard field goal, 12:37. Broncos 17–0. **Drive: 11 plays, 49 yards, 4:48.**
- DEN – Demaryius Thomas 63-yard pass from Peyton Manning (Matt Prater kick), 5:37. Broncos 24–0. **Drive: 6 plays, 80 yards, 2:39.**
- DEN – Demaryius Thomas 5-yard pass from Peyton Manning (Matt Prater kick), 0:13. Broncos 31–0. **Drive: 10 plays, 89 yards, 3:13.**

**Third quarter**

- No scoring plays.

**Fourth quarter**

- DEN – Matt Prater 54-yard field goal, 6:36. Broncos 34–0. **Drive: 7 plays, 24 yards, 2:57.**
- OAK – Rod Streater 14-yard pass from Terrelle Pryor (Sebastian Janikowski kick), 4:24. Broncos 34–7. **Drive: 8 plays, 80 yards, 2:12.**
- OAK – Nick Kasa 9-yard pass from Terrelle Pryor (Sebastian Janikowski kick), 0:37. Broncos 34–14. **Drive: 9 plays, 75 yards, 2:36.**

**Top passers**

- DEN – Peyton Manning – 25/28, 266 yards, 4 TD
- OAK – Terrelle Pryor – 21/38, 207 yards, 2 TD

**Top rushers**

- DEN – Montee Ball – 10 rushes, 72 yards
- OAK – Terrelle Pryor – 9 rushes, 49 yards

**Top receivers**

- DEN – DeMaryius Thomas – 6 receptions, 113 yards, 2 TD
- OAK – Denarius Moore – 4 receptions, 63 yards

Hoping to gain momentum into the playoffs, the Broncos traveled to the O.co Coliseum for an AFC West divisional rematch with the Oakland Raiders, in the 2013 regular season finale. The Broncos dominated this game from the start. In the first quarter, quarterback Peyton Manning threw a pair of touchdown passes – a 3-yarder to wide receiver Eric Decker and a 7-yarder to running back Knowshon Moreno. In the second quarter, placekicker Matt Prater added a 34-yard field goal, and later in the second quarter, Manning connected with wide receiver Demaryius Thomas on a 63-yard touchdown pass. This gave the Broncos a 24–0 lead, in which the Broncos set a new NFL record for points scored in a single season. Just before halftime, Manning once again connected with Thomas on another touchdown pass – from 5 yards out, in which Manning set a new NFL record for single-season passing yardage. Manning sat out the entire second half, and backup quarterback Brock Osweiler took over. After a scoreless third quarter, Prater added a 54-yard field goal in the fourth quarter. The Raiders finally got on the scoreboard, with quarterback Terrelle Pryor throwing a pair of touchdown passes – a 14-yarder to wide receiver Rod Streater and a 9-yarder to tight end Nick Kasa, but the outcome of the game had already been decided in the Broncos' favor.

Notes

With the win, the Broncos clinched a first-round bye and homefield advantage throughout the AFC playoffs, as well as sweeping their division rivals on the road for the fourth time in five seasons.

=== Standings ===
==== Division ====
AFC West
	W	L	T	PCT	DIV	CONF	PF	PA	STK
^{(1)} Denver Broncos	13	3	0	.813	5–1	9–3	606	399	W2
^{(5)} Kansas City Chiefs	11	5	0	.688	2–4	7–5	430	305	L2
^{(6)} San Diego Chargers	9	7	0	.563	4–2	6–6	396	348	W4
Oakland Raiders	4	12	0	.250	1–5	4–8	322	453	L6

==== Conference ====
AFC
#	Team	Division	W	L	T	PCT	DIV	CONF	SOS	SOV	STK
**Division winners**
1	Denver Broncos	West	13	3	0	.813	5–1	9–3	.469	.423	W2
2	New England Patriots	East	12	4	0	.750	4–2	9–3	.473	.427	W2
3 (Note: Cincinnati defeated Indianapolis head-to-head (Week 14, 42–28).)	Cincinnati Bengals	North	11	5	0	.688	3–3	8–4	.480	.494	W2
4	Indianapolis Colts	South	11	5	0	.688	6–0	9–3	.484	.449	W3
**Wild cards**
5	Kansas City Chiefs	West	11	5	0	.688	2–4	7–5	.445	.335	L2
6	San Diego Chargers	West	9	7	0	.563	4–2	6–6	.496	.549	W4
**Did not qualify for the postseason**
7 (Note: Pittsburgh finished with a better division record than Baltimore.) (Note: Pittsburgh defeated the New York Jets head-to-head (Week 6, 19–6).)	Pittsburgh Steelers	North	8	8	0	.500	4–2	6–6	.469	.441	W3
8 (Note: Baltimore defeated the New York Jets head-to-head (Week 12, 19–3).)	Baltimore Ravens	North	8	8	0	.500	3–3	6–6	.484	.418	L2
9 (Note: The New York Jets finished with a better division record than Miami.)	New York Jets	East	8	8	0	.500	3–3	5–7	.488	.414	W2
10	Miami Dolphins	East	8	8	0	.500	2–4	7–5	.523	.523	L2
11	Tennessee Titans	South	7	9	0	.438	2–4	6–6	.504	.375	W2
12	Buffalo Bills	East	6	10	0	.375	3–3	5–7	.520	.500	L1
13 (Note: Oakland and Jacksonville finished with a better conference record than Cleveland.) (Note: Oakland defeated Jacksonville head-to-head (Week 2, 19–9).)	Oakland Raiders	West	4	12	0	.250	1–5	4–8	.523	.359	L6
14 (Note: Jacksonville defeated Cleveland head-to-head (Week 13, 32–28).)	Jacksonville Jaguars	South	4	12	0	.250	3–3	4–8	.504	.234	L3
15	Cleveland Browns	North	4	12	0	.250	2–4	3–9	.516	.477	L7
16	Houston Texans	South	2	14	0	.125	1–5	2–10	.559	.500	L14
**Tiebreakers** (Note: When breaking ties for three or more teams under the NFL's rules, they are first broken within divisions, then comparing only the highest ranked remaining team from each division.)

=== Statistics ===
==== Team leaders ====
Category	Player(s)	Value
Passing yards	Peyton Manning	5,477 *
Passing touchdowns	Peyton Manning	55 *
Rushing yards	Knowshon Moreno	1,038
Rushing touchdowns	Knowshon Moreno	10
Receptions	Demaryius Thomas	92
Receiving yards	Demaryius Thomas	1,430
Receiving touchdowns	Demaryius Thomas	14 **
Points	Matt Prater	150
Kickoff return yards	Trindon Holliday	775
Punt return yards	Trindon Holliday	271
Tackles	Danny Trevathan	128
Sacks	Shaun Phillips	10
Forced fumbles	Danny Trevathan	4
Interceptions	Chris Harris, Jr. Dominique Rodgers-Cromartie; Danny Trevathan	3

*	Indicates a new single-season NFL record.
**	Indicates a tied single-season franchise record.

Source for this section: Denver Broncos' official website.

==== League rankings ====
Offense
Category	Value	NFL rank (out of 32)
Total yards	457.3 YPG	1st
Yards per play	6.3	2nd
Rushing yards	117.1 YPG	15th
Yards per rush	4.1	17th
Passing yards	340.2 YPG	1st
Yards per pass	8.3	3rd
Scoring	37.9 PPG	1st
Pass completions	461/675 (.683)	3rd
Third downs	95/205 (.463)	2nd
Possession average	30:31	15th
Sacks allowed	20	1st
Turnover differential	0	T–14th

Defense
Category	Value	NFL rank (out of 32)
Total yards per game	356	19th
Yards per play	5.3	16th
Rushing yards per game	101.6	T–7th
Yards per rush	3.9	8th
Passing yards per game	254.4	27th
Yards per pass	7.1	16th
Scoring per game	24.9	22nd
Pass completions	357/613 (.582)	6th
Third downs	83/218 (.381)	16th
Sacks	41	T–13th
Forced fumbles	16	T–6th
Fumble recoveries	9	T–20th
Interceptions	17	T–12th

Special teams
Category	Value	NFL rank (out of 32)
Kickoff returns	25 YPR	6th
Punt returns	7.8 YPR	22nd
Gross punting	43.8 YPP	24th
Net punting	38.8 YPP	23rd
Kickoff coverage	29.3 YPR	32nd
Punt coverage	9.8 YPR	23rd

Source for this section: NFL.com.

== Postseason ==
=== Schedule ===
Round	Date	Opponent (seed)	Result	Record	Venue	Recap
Wild Card	First-round bye					
Divisional	January 12, 2014	San Diego Chargers (6)	W 24–17	1–0	Sports Authority Field at Mile High	Recap
AFC Championship	January 19, 2014	New England Patriots (2)	W 26–16	2–0	Sports Authority Field at Mile High	Recap
Super Bowl XLVIII	February 2, 2014	vs. Seattle Seahawks (N1)	L 8–43	2–1	MetLife Stadium	Recap

=== Game summaries ===
==== AFC Divisional Playoffs: vs. (6) San Diego Chargers ====
AFC Divisional Playoffs: (#6) San Diego Chargers at (#1) Denver Broncos – Game summary

Quarter	1	2	3	4	Total
Chargers	0	0	0	17	17
Broncos	7	7	3	7	24

at Sports Authority Field at Mile High, Denver, Colorado

- Date: January 12, 2014
- Game time: 2:40 p.m. MST
- Game weather: 41 °F (5 °C), partly cloudy
- Game attendance: 76,969
- Referee: Clete Blakeman
- TV announcers (CBS): Jim Nantz, Phil Simms and Tracy Wolfson
- Recap, Gamebook

Game information

First quarter

- DEN – Demaryius Thomas 2-yard pass from Peyton Manning (Matt Prater kick), 2:25. Broncos 7–0. Drive: 14 plays, 86 yards, 7:01.

Second quarter

- DEN – Wes Welker 3-yard pass from Peyton Manning (Matt Prater kick), 6:00. Broncos 14–0. Drive: 9 plays, 57 yards, 5:13.

Third quarter

- DEN – Matt Prater 45-yard field goal, 9:35. Broncos 17–0. Drive: 12 plays, 37 yards, 5:25.

Fourth quarter

- SD – Keenan Allen 16-yard pass from Philip Rivers (Nick Novak kick), 12:59. Broncos 17–7. Drive: 6 plays, 63 yards, 3:08.
- DEN – Knowshon Moreno 3-yard run (Matt Prater kick), 8:12. Broncos 24–7. Drive: 9 plays, 81 yards, 4:47.
- SD – Keenan Allen 16-yard pass from Philip Rivers (Nick Novak kick), 5:43. Broncos 24–14. Drive: 7 plays, 80 yards, 2:29.
- SD – Nick Novak 30-yard field goal, 3:53. Broncos 24–17. Drive: 8 plays, 48 yards, 1:50.

Top passers

- SD – Philip Rivers – 18/27, 217 yards, 2 TD
- DEN – Peyton Manning – 25/36, 230 yards, 2 TD, INT

Top rushers

- SD – Danny Woodhead – 9 rushes, 29 yards
- DEN – Knowshon Moreno – 23 rushes, 82 yards, TD

Top receivers

- SD – Keenan Allen – 6 receptions, 142 yards, 2 TD
- DEN – Julius Thomas – 6 receptions, 76 yards

Following a first-round bye, the Broncos began their run in the 2013–14 NFL playoffs at home by welcoming their AFC West division rivals, the San Diego Chargers, in the teams' first-ever playoff meeting. The Broncos grabbed the lead late in the first quarter, with quarterback Peyton Manning connecting on a 2-yard touchdown pass to wide receiver Demaryius Thomas. After Chargers' placekicker Nick Novak missed a 53-yard field goal early in the second quarter, the Broncos added to their lead, with Manning throwing a 3-yard touchdown pass to wide receiver Wes Welker. Just before halftime, the Broncos tried to add to their lead, after wide receiver Eric Decker stumbled on a long punt return, when it appeared that he was headed to the end zone for a touchdown. However, eight plays later, Manning was intercepted in the end zone by Chargers' linebacker Donald Butler. A 45-yard field goal by Broncos' placekicker Matt Prater on the opening possession of the second half was the only scoring play of the third quarter, as Prater later missed a 47-yard field goal toward the end of the third quarter. The Chargers finally got on the scoreboard at the 13:03 mark of the fourth quarter, with quarterback Philip Rivers connecting on a 16-yard touchdown pass to wide receiver Keenan Allen. The Broncos subsequently responded, with running back Knowshon Moreno rushing for a 3-yard touchdown. Trailing 24–7 with 8:12 remaining in the game, the Chargers attempted a rally on their next possession. The Chargers were facing a 4th-and-5 on their own 36-yard line, and Rivers connected on a 49-yard pass to Allen to keep the Chargers alive. Three plays later, Rivers connected with Allen on another 16-yard touchdown pass. After the Chargers recovered the ensuing onside kick, a 30-yard field goal by Novak pulled the Chargers to within 24–17 with 3:56 remaining in the game. The Broncos' offense then ran out the clock, which included Manning completing two critical third-down passing plays to tight end Julius Thomas and Moreno converting a 3rd-and-1 into a game-clinching first down.

With the win, the Broncos advanced to the AFC Championship game for the first time since 2005.

==== AFC Championship: vs. (2) New England Patriots ====
AFC Championship: (#2) New England Patriots at (#1) Denver Broncos – Game summary

Quarter	1	2	3	4	Total
Patriots	0	3	0	13	16
Broncos	3	10	7	6	26

at Sports Authority Field at Mile High, Denver, Colorado

- Date: January 19, 2014
- Game time: 1:00 pm. MST
- Game weather: 63 °F (17 °C), sunny
- Game attendance: 77,110
- Referee: Tony Corrente
- TV announcers (CBS): Jim Nantz, Phil Simms and Tracy Wolfson
- Recap, Gamebook

Game information

First quarter

- DEN – Matt Prater 27-yard field goal, 3:43. Broncos 3–0. Drive: 10 plays, 73 yards, 4:07.

Second quarter

- DEN – Jacob Tamme 1-yard pass from Peyton Manning (Matt Prater kick), 7:50. Broncos 10–0. Drive: 15 plays, 93 yards, 7:01.
- NE – Stephen Gostkowski 47-yard field goal, 2:54. Broncos 10–3. Drive: 9 plays, 51 yards, 4:56.
- DEN – Matt Prater 35-yard field goal, 0:25. Broncos 13–3. Drive: 8 plays, 63 yards, 2:29.

Third quarter

- DEN – Demaryius Thomas 3-yard pass from Peyton Manning (Matt Prater kick), 7:52. Broncos 20–3. Drive: 13 plays, 80 yards, 7:08.

Fourth quarter

- DEN – Matt Prater 19-yard field goal, 12:02. Broncos 23–3. Drive: 9 plays, 60 yards, 5:23.
- NE – Julian Edelman 7-yard pass from Tom Brady (Stephen Gostkowski kick), 9:26. Broncos 23–10. Drive: 9 plays, 80 yards, 2:36.
- DEN – Matt Prater 54-yard field goal, 7:00. Broncos 26–10. Drive: 6 plays, 39 yards, 2:26.
- NE – Tom Brady 5-yard run (run failed), 3:07. Broncos 26–16. Drive: 10 plays, 80 yards, 3:53.

Top passers

- NE – Tom Brady – 24/38, 277 yards, TD
- DEN – Peyton Manning – 32/43, 400 yards, 2 TD

Top rushers

- NE – Shane Vereen – 4 rushes, 34 yards
- DEN – Knowshon Moreno – 14 rushes, 59 yards

Top receivers

- NE – Julian Edelman – 10 receptions, 89 yards, TD
- DEN – Demaryius Thomas – 7 receptions, 134 yards, TD

Coming off their win over the Chargers in the Divisional round, the Broncos welcomed the No. 2 seed New England Patriots to Sports Authority Field at Mile High, for the AFC Championship. The Broncos' defense forced the Patriots' offense to go three-and-out on their first two offensive possessions. The Broncos were forced to punt on their first offensive possession, but did not punt for the remainder of the game. A 27-yard field goal by placekicker Matt Prater gave the Broncos the lead late in the first quarter. After the Broncos' defense forced another Patriots' punt, the Broncos put together a 15-play, 93-yard drive that chewed up seven minutes of the second quarter, and added to their lead, with quarterback Peyton Manning connecting on a 1-yard touchdown pass to tight end Jacob Tamme. The two teams then subsequently traded field goals, with a 47-yarder by Patriots' placekicker Stephen Gostkowski and a 35-yarder by Prater just before halftime, to give the Broncos a 13–3 lead.

The Broncos took the opening possession of the second half and added to their lead, with a 13-play, 80-yard drive that chewed up the first seven minutes of the third quarter, culminating with Manning throwing a 3-yard touchdown pass to wide receiver Demaryius Thomas. On the Patriots' first offensive possession of the second half, the Patriots drove to the Broncos' 29-yard line and faced a 4th-and-2, however, Broncos' defensive tackle Terrance Knighton sacked Patriots' quarterback Tom Brady, forcing a turnover on downs. The Broncos subsequently added to lead early in the fourth quarter, with a 19-yard field goal by Prater. The Patriots finally got into the end zone on their next possession, with Brady connecting on a 7-yard touchdown pass to wide receiver Julian Edelman, but the Broncos subsequently added to their lead, with Prater nailing a 54-yard field goal with seven minutes remaining. Trailing 26–10, the Patriots tried to rally, with Brady scrambling up the middle for a 5-yard touchdown run. However, the Broncos' defense subsequently thwarted a two-point conversion attempt by Patriots' running back Shane Vereen to get the Patriots to within a one-score deficit, keeping the score at 26–16 with 3:13 remaining in the game. The Patriots tried an onside kick, but Broncos' wide receiver Eric Decker recovered the football near midfield. The Broncos' offense then forced the Patriots to use all of their timeouts and ran out the clock, aided by a critical 5-yard run on 4th-and-2 by running back Montee Ball just after the two-minute warning.

With the win, the Broncos advanced to Super Bowl XLVIII, the team's first Super Bowl appearance since winning back-to-back Super Bowls in 1997 and 1998.

Notes

This was head coach John Fox's first win over Bill Belichick and the Patriots in the postseason, previously losing to the Patriots in the 2011 Divisional playoffs, and Super Bowl XXXVIII as Carolina Panthers' head coach.

==== Super Bowl XLVIII: vs. (N1) Seattle Seahawks ====
Super Bowl XLVIII: Seattle Seahawks (N1) vs. Denver Broncos (A1) – Game summary

Quarter	1	2	3	4	Total
Seahawks	8	14	14	7	43
Broncos	0	0	8	0	8

at MetLife Stadium, East Rutherford, New Jersey

- Date: February 2, 2014
- Game time: 6:25 p.m. EST/4:25 pm. MST
- Game weather: 49 °F (9 °C), partly cloudy
- Game attendance: 82,529
- Referee: Terry McAulay
- TV announcers (Fox): Joe Buck, Troy Aikman, Pam Oliver and Erin Andrews
- Recap, Gamebook

Game information

First quarter

- SEA – Knowshon Moreno tackled in the end zone by Cliff Avril for a safety, 14:48. Seahawks 2–0.
- SEA – Steven Hauschka 31-yard field goal, 10:21. Seahawks 5–0. Drive: 9 plays, 51 yards, 4:27.
- SEA – Steven Hauschka 33-yard field goal, 2:16. Seahawks 8–0. Drive: 13 plays, 58 yards, 6:15.

Second quarter

- SEA – Marshawn Lynch 1-yard run (Steven Hauschka kick), 12:00. Seahawks 15–0. Drive: 7 plays, 37 yards, 3:59.
- SEA – Malcolm Smith 69-yard interception return (Steven Hauschka kick), 3:21. Seahawks 22–0.

Third quarter

- SEA – Percy Harvin 87-yard kickoff return (Steven Hauschka kick), 14:48. Seahawks 29–0. Drive: 0 plays, 0 yards, 0:12.
- SEA – Jermaine Kearse 23-yard pass from Russell Wilson (Steven Hauschka kick), 2:58. Seahawks 36–0. Drive: 6 plays, 58 yards, 2:57.
- DEN – Demaryius Thomas 14-yard pass from Peyton Manning (Peyton Manning–Wes Welker pass), 0:00. Seahawks 36–8. Drive: 6 plays, 80 yards, 2:58.

Fourth quarter

- SEA – Doug Baldwin 10-yard pass from Russell Wilson (Steven Hauschka kick), 11:45. Seahawks 43–8. Drive: 5 plays, 48 yards, 3:15.

Top passers

- SEA – Russell Wilson – 18/25, 206 yards, 2 TD
- DEN – Peyton Manning – 34/49, 280 yards, TD, 2 INT

Top rushers

- SEA – Percy Harvin – 2 rushes, 45 yards
- DEN – Knowshon Moreno – 5 rushes, 17 yards

Top receivers

- SEA – Doug Baldwin – 5 receptions, 66 yards, TD
- DEN – Demaryius Thomas – 13 receptions, 118 yards, TD

On the first offensive play of the game, an errant snap by Broncos' center Manny Ramirez over the head of quarterback Peyton Manning resulted in a safety that gave the Seahawks the early lead only 12 seconds into the game. Placekicker Steven Hauschka added field goals of 31 and 33 yards to give the Seahawks an 8–0 lead after the first quarter. The Broncos' offense went three-and-out on their second offensive possession, and three plays into the Broncos' third offensive possession, Manning was intercepted by Seahawks' safety Kam Chancellor at the Broncos' 39-yard line toward the end of the first quarter. Early in the second quarter, the Seahawks added to their lead, with running back Marshawn Lynch rushing for a 1-yard touchdown. The Broncos earned their first 1st-down on their next offensive possession at the 10:13 mark of the second quarter, however, the Seahawks' defense forced another turnover off Manning – defensive end Cliff Avril altered a pass by Manning, and linebacker Malcolm Smith intercepted the football and returned it 69 yards for a touchdown. The Broncos' offense drove to the Seahawks' 19-yard line one minute before halftime, and decided to go for a first down instead of kick a field goal. However, a short pass from Manning intended for wide receiver Demaryius Thomas was deflected by Avril and fell incomplete, giving the Seahawks a 22–0 halftime lead.

Things got much worse for the Broncos, as Seahawks' wide receiver/return specialist Percy Harvin returned the opening kickoff of the second half 87 yards for a touchdown. The two teams then traded punts on their next possessions, and later in the third quarter, Seahawks' cornerback Byron Maxwell forced a fumble off Demaryius Thomas, and the Seahawks capitalized six plays later, with quarterback Russell Wilson connecting with wide receiver Jermaine Kearse on a 23-yard touchdown pass to give the Seahawks a commanding 36–0 lead. The Broncos finally got on the scoreboard at the end of the third quarter, with a 14-yard touchdown pass from Manning to Demaryius Thomas (coupled with a two-point pass from Manning to wide receiver Wes Welker). This was the Broncos' only scoring play of the game, and the Seahawks added one more scoring play early in the fourth quarter, with a 10-yard touchdown pass from Wilson to wide receiver Doug Baldwin.

With the loss, the Broncos' record in Super Bowls dropped to 2–5.

Notes

This marked cornerback Champ Bailey's final game in a Broncos' uniform, as he was released on March 6, 2014.

== Records and milestones ==
Numerous individual, franchise and league records and milestones were either tied, reached or broken during the season:

=== Team ===
- Week 4: The Broncos set two franchise records – points scored in a single game (52) and consecutive regular-season wins (15).
- September: The month of September marked the first time in Broncos' franchise history that two players earned player of the month awards in the same month, with quarterback Peyton Manning earning the AFC Offensive player of the Month award and return specialist Trindon Holliday earning the Special Teams Player of the Month award.
- Week 5: Set a new NFL record for points scored within the first five games of a season, with 230.
- Week 8: The Broncos set a franchise record for points in a quarter, with 31, and also set a new NFL record for points scored within the first eight games of a season, with 343.
- Week 10: The Broncos' 28–20 win over the San Diego Chargers on November 10 marked the 300th win for Pat Bowlen in his 30th season as the Broncos' team owner – the fastest NFL owner to reach that feat.
- Week 14: Set a new franchise record for points scored in a single season; became the first team in NFL history to have four players score at least 10 touchdowns within a single season; became the first team since the AFL–NFL merger to score at least 50 points three times during a single season.
- Week 16: Became the first team in NFL history to have five players score at least 10 touchdowns within a single season; John Fox became only the fifth head coach in NFL history to win a division title in each of his first three seasons with a team.
- Week 17: Set a new NFL record for points scored in a single season, with 606; became only the third team in NFL history to surpass 7,000 net yards in a single season, with 7,317.
- Regular season: Set a new NFL single-season record with 76 touchdowns, eclipsing the previous record of 75 touchdowns that was held by the 2007 New England Patriots; set a new franchise record for first downs in a season, with 435, as well as for total yards from scrimmage, with 7,317.
- Super Bowl XLVIII: John Fox became the sixth head coach in NFL history to lead two different teams to a Super Bowl – Fox also led the Carolina Panthers to Super Bowl XXXVIII.

=== Peyton Manning ===
- Week 1: Became the seventh quarterback in NFL history to throw seven touchdown passes in a game, and the first to do so since Joe Kapp in 1969.
- Week 2: Became the third quarterback in NFL history to reach 60,000 passing yards, joining Brett Favre and Dan Marino.
- Week 3: Became the first quarterback in NFL history to throw 12 touchdown passes within the first three games of a season, a record that was surpassed by Seattle Seahawks' quarterback Russell Wilson in 2020.
- Week 4: Became the first quarterback in NFL history to throw 16 touchdown passes within the first four games of a season; set a new NFL record for four-touchdown games for the 24th time in his career, surpassing Brett Favre; set a personal record for consecutive passes without an interception (201).
- Week 5: Set a new NFL record for touchdown passes to start a season without an interception, with 20; surpassed Dan Marino for second-place on the NFL's all-time career passing yards list.
- Week 6: Set a new NFL record for touchdown passes within the first six games of a season, with 22.
- Week 8: Achieved 2,919 passing yards, setting a new NFL record for the most passing yards within the first eight games of a season.
- Week 10: Set a new NFL record for regular-season road wins with 74, surpassing Brett Favre; tied Tom Brady's NFL record for touchdown passes within the first nine games of a season, with 33.
- Week 13: Set a new franchise record for touchdown passes in a single season, which Manning previously set in 2012.
- Week 14: Set a new franchise record with touchdown passes to four different receivers in a single game; set a new NFL record for games with at least four touchdown passes in a single season; set a new franchise record for pass completions in a single game (39) and tied a franchise record for pass attempts in a single game (59); with the Broncos clinching a playoff berth, Manning surpassed Brett Favre for the most seasons in the playoffs for a quarterback.
- Week 15: Set a new career high for passing yards during a single season, which also sets a new franchise record for passing yards during a single season – Manning previously set the record for passing yards in 2012.
- Week 16: With his 51st touchdown pass of the season, Manning set a new NFL record for touchdown passes during a single season, surpassing the previous record that Tom Brady set in 2007; with his 400 passing yards against the Houston Texans, Manning tied Dan Marino's 1984 mark for 400-yard passing games in a single season, with 4.
- Week 17: With four touchdown passes in the regular-season finale against the Oakland Raiders, Manning extended his newly-set NFL record for touchdown passes during a single season to 55; Manning also reached 5,477 passing yards, surpassing the previous single-season passing record that Drew Brees set in 2011; at the time, Manning set a new single-game franchise record for pass completion percentage (25/28, .893), until Bo Nix surpassed that record in 2024.
- Regular season: Set new single-season franchise records for pass completions (450), pass attempts (659) and passer rating (115.3). Manning threw at least one touchdown pass in 49 consecutive games as a Bronco (including the playoffs) – a streak that ended in Week 14 of the 2014 season, shattering the old franchise record of 26 that was held by former Broncos' quarterback Brian Griese.
- Super Bowl XLVIII: Became only the third quarterback in NFL history to start a Super Bowl with two different teams – Manning started two Super Bowls with the Indianapolis Colts in 2006 and 2009; set a new Super Bowl record for pass completions, with 34.

=== Other players ===
- Eric Decker: During the Broncos' Week 13 win over the Kansas City Chiefs, Decker became the first player in franchise history to catch four touchdown passes in a single game.
- Trindon Holliday: 105-yard kickoff return for a touchdown during the team's Week 4 win over the Philadelphia Eagles tied a record for the longest play in franchise history, which Holliday previously set in 2012.
- Knowshon Moreno: During the Broncos' Week 16 win over the Houston Texans, Moreno became the first player in franchise history to rush for over 1,000 yards and receive over 500 yards during the same season.
- Matt Prater:
  - Week 14: Prater kicked a 64-yard field goal, which, at the time, was the longest in NFL history, until Baltimore Ravens' placekicker Justin Tucker surpassed that record with a 66-yard field goal in 2021.
  - Regular season: Set a new NFL record for extra points in a single season, with 75; set a new single-season franchise record for points scored in a season, with 150, surpassing the previous record of 138 that was held by Terrell Davis in 1998.
- Demaryius Thomas:
  - Regular season: Tied a franchise record for receiving touchdowns in a single season, with 14.
  - Super Bowl XLVIII: Demaryius Thomas recorded 13 pass receptions, which, at the time, set a new Super Bowl record, until New England Patriots' running back James White surpassed that record in Super Bowl LI, with 14 receptions.
- Julius Thomas: During the Broncos' Week 14 win over the Tennessee Titans, Julius Thomas set a new franchise record for the most touchdown receptions by a tight end in a single season, surpassing the previous record of 10 touchdowns that was held by Shannon Sharpe in 1996.

=== Passing yardage controversy ===
On December 31, 2013, two days after the end of the regular season, media reports indicated that Peyton Manning's passing yardage record was being reviewed by the NFL. Manning sat out the second half of the Broncos' Week 17 win over the Oakland Raiders, after he had eclipsed Drew Brees' record for single-season passing yardage by one yard just before halftime. However, Manning's record was called into question, due to a play that could have been ruled as a running play instead of a forward pass. Near the end of the first quarter of the Broncos' Week 17 win over the Raiders, Manning completed what was, at the time, ruled as a 7-yard pass to wide receiver Eric Decker. However, the pass appeared to be a lateral from CBS camera angles, as Manning appeared to throw the football from the Broncos' 49-yard line, and Decker appeared to catch the pass from the Broncos' 48-yard line, indicating that the play should have been recorded as a running play, not a passing play. Manning later set the single-season passing yardage record with a 5-yard touchdown pass to wide receiver Demaryius Thomas just before halftime. After further review by the NFL and the Elias Sports Bureau, the league upheld the initial ruling, resulting in Manning's new NFL record for single-season passing yardage remaining intact.

== Awards and honors ==
Recipient	awards
Eric Decker	Week 13: AFC Offensive Player of the Week
Trindon Holliday	Week 2: AFC Special Teams Player of the Week; September: AFC Special Teams Player of the Month
Peyton Manning	Week 1: AFC Offensive Player of the Week, FedEx Air Player of the Week; Week 3: AFC Offensive Player of the Week, FedEx Air Player of the Week; September: AFC Offensive Player of the Month; Week 13: FedEx Air Player of the Week; Week 16: AFC Offensive Player of the Week, FedEx Air Player of the Week; Sports Illustrated Sportsman of the Year; December: AFC Offensive Player of the Month; 2013 Colorado Sports Hall of Fame Athlete of the Year; 2013 Associated Press NFL Most Valuable Player (Note: Peyton Manning received 49 of 50 votes; New England Patriots' quarterback Tom Brady received the other vote.); 2013 Associated Press NFL Offensive Player of the Year; 2013 FedEx Air Player of the Year; 2014 ESPY Awards: Best NFL Player and Best Record-Breaking Performance; Named to the USA Football All Fundamentals Team
Matt Prater	Week 14: AFC Special Teams Player of the Week
Luke Richesson	2013 NFL Strength and Conditioning Coach of the Year
Dominique Rodgers-Cromartie	Week 8: AFC Defensive Player of the Week
Demaryius Thomas	Week 10: AFC Offensive Player of the Week
Wesley Woodyard	Named as the Team's Walter Payton Man of the Year
Team	Week 5: GMC Never Say Never Moment of the Week (come-from-behind win)

=== Pro Bowl and All-Pro selections ===
Five Broncos were selected to the 2014 Pro Bowl: quarterback Peyton Manning, placekicker Matt Prater, wide receiver Demaryius Thomas, tight end Julius Thomas and guard Louis Vasquez. However, due to participation in Super Bowl XLVIII, none of them participated in the Pro Bowl. Manning and Vasquez were also voted to the 2013 All-Pro First Team, while Prater and Demaryius Thomas were named to the Second Team.

== Other news and notes ==
- Sports Authority Field at Mile High underwent $30 million in stadium upgrades prior to the start of the 2013 season, including a new high-definition LED video board on the stadium's south end zone that triples the size of the old video board.
- On July 15, 2013, the Broncos suspended two front office executives for separate drunk driving arrests. Tom Heckert, Jr., who was hired as the team's director of pro personnel in May, was suspended for one month without pay stemming from a June 11 arrest in Parker, Colorado, as well as measuring a blood-alcohol level of .162 – twice the legal limit. Matt Russell, the team's director of player personnel, was suspended indefinitely without pay stemming from a July 6 arrest in Summit County, Colorado, in which he collided with two vehicles – one of them a police car, as well as measuring a blood-alcohol level of .246 – three times the legal limit. After the Broncos notified the NFL of its disciplinary plans, the NFL announced that no further punishment will be imposed. On September 16, Russell was reinstated by the Broncos after being suspended for two months.
- On December 8, 2013, prior to the Broncos' Week 14 home game vs. Tennessee Titans, the press box at Sports Authority Field at Mile High was officially named the "Jim Saccomano Press Box," in honor of Jim Saccomano, the team's vice president of corporate communications for the past 36 seasons, who announced his retirement effective at the end of the 2013 season.
- The paid attendance of 77,110 for the Broncos' AFC Championship game vs. the New England Patriots on January 19, 2014, was the second-largest crowd in team history.
