= Kayvon Webster =

American football player (born 1991)

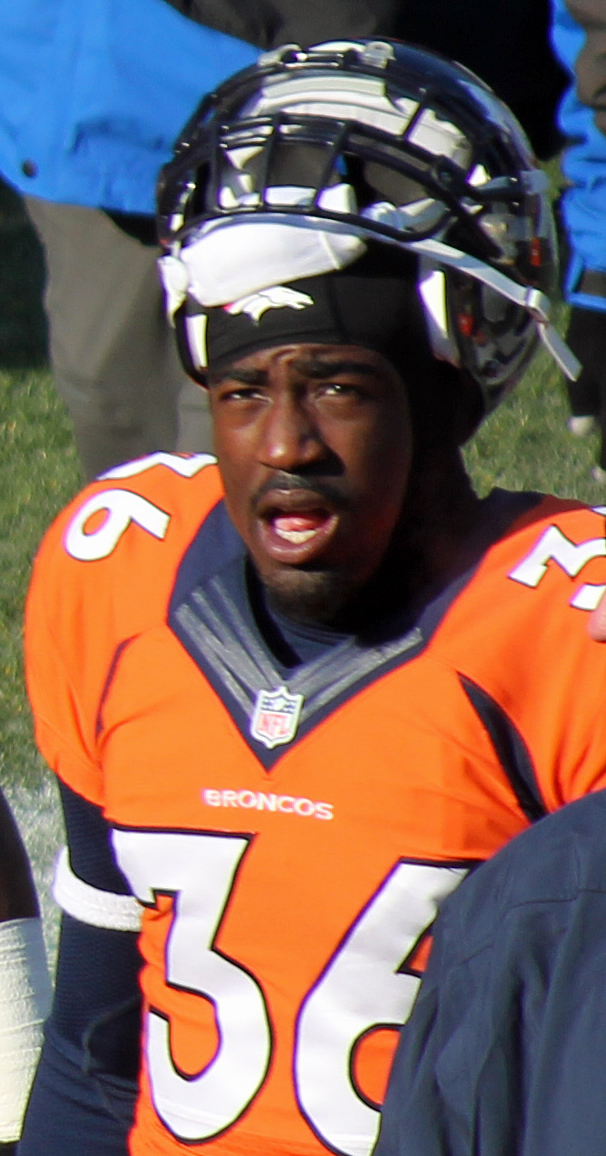
- Webster with the Denver Broncos in 2013

No. 36, 21, 38
- Position: Cornerback

Personal information
- Born: February 1, 1991 (age 35); Miami, Florida, U.S.
- Listed height: 5 ft 11 in (1.80 m)
- Listed weight: 190 lb (86 kg)

Career information
- High school: Monsignor Edward Pace (Miami Gardens, Florida)
- College: South Florida (2009–2012)
- NFL draft: 2013: 3rd round, 90th overall pick

Career history
- Denver Broncos (2013–2016); Los Angeles Rams (2017); Houston Texans (2018); New Orleans Saints (2019)*; Washington Redskins (2019)
- * Offseason or practice squad member only

Awards and highlights
- Super Bowl champion (50); Second-team All-Big East (2011)

Career NFL statistics
- Total tackles: 129
- Forced fumbles: 1
- Pass deflections: 23
- Interceptions: 2
- Stats at Pro Football Reference

Kayvon Webster (born February 1, 1991) is an American former professional football player who was a cornerback in the National Football League (NFL). He played college football for the South Florida Bulls and was selected by the Denver Broncos in the third round of the 2013 NFL draft. He was also a member of the Los Angeles Rams, Houston Texans, New Orleans Saints and Washington Redskins. He won Super Bowl 50 as a member of the Broncos.

== Early life ==
A native of Miami, Florida, Webster attended Monsignor Edward Pace High School in Miami Gardens, Florida, where he was a letterman in football and track. In football, he saw action on both sides of the ball and as a return specialist and was a two-time first-team All-Dade selection. During his junior season, he caught 30 passes for 500 yards with eight touchdowns on offense, while also adding 65 tackles, four sacks, seven forced fumbles and 10 fumble recoveries on defense. Academically, he carried a 3.0 GPA.

In addition to football, Webster was a standout track & field athlete, Webster was one of the state's top performers in the sprinting events. He earned All-Dade County First-team 3A track and field honors in 2007 and All-Dade County First-team 3A football honors in 2008. He was tabbed All-American by Track & Field News in the 4 × 100 m in 2009. He led the Pace Spartans 4 × 100 m relay team to three straight Florida 2A state championships his sophomore and junior seasons, and posted the fastest time in the nation in the 4 × 100 m relay with a time of 40.54 seconds as a senior, setting the state meet record in the process. He took silver in the 100 meters at the 2009 Region 4 meet, with a time of 10.67 meters. Additionally, he was also timed at 4.4 seconds in the 40-yard dash and posted a 245-pound bench press.

Regarded as a three-star recruit by Rivals.com, Webster was rated as the 28th-best safety in the nation, 29th according to Scout.com. He was also ranked as the 32nd-best prospect as an athlete by ESPN.com. He committed to play college football for the USF Bulls over offers from Auburn, Florida, Florida International, Miami, Ole Miss, South Carolina, Syracuse, Tennessee, and Vanderbilt.

== College career ==
Webster attended the University of South Florida, where he played college football for the South Florida Bulls football team from 2009 to 2012. He was a second-team All-Big East Conference selection in 2011. In 2012, Webster racked up a career-high 81 tackles (61 solo) during his senior year with 3 forced fumbles. In four years at USF, Webster played in 49 games with 32 starts at cornerback, recording 190 tackles, 2 sacks, 3 interceptions, 15 pass deflections, 4 forced fumbles, and 2 fumble recoveries. He ranked 12th on the program's all-time list with his 49 career games played.

In addition to football, Webster competed as a sprinter at USF, where he competed as a sophomore and junior. In 2010, he qualified for the BIG EAST Championships in the 100 m and 200 meters. He earned All-Big East honors after placing 3rd in the 4 × 100 m relay event at the BIG EAST Championships in a school record of 40.75 seconds. In 2011, he took fifth in the 60 meters at the BIG EAST Championships, with a time of 6.91 seconds. He was a member of the 4 × 100 m relay that placed 2nd at the BIG EAST Championships with a time of 40.77 seconds, nearly breaking the previous record. He recorded a career-best time of 6.83 seconds in the 60-meter dash at the BIG EAST Conference Championships. His personal-best time in the 100 meters came at the USF Collegiate Invitational in 2012, where he took silver with a time of 10.5 seconds.

Webster graduated from South Florida with a bachelor's degree in health science in December 2012.

== Professional career ==
Pre-draft measurables
| Height | Weight | Arm length | Hand span | 40-yard dash | 10-yard split | 20-yard split | 20-yard shuttle | Three-cone drill | Vertical jump | Broad jump | Bench press |
|---|---|---|---|---|---|---|---|---|---|---|---|
| 5 ft 10 1/2 in (1.79 m) | 195 lb (88 kg) | 32 1/2 in (0.83 m) | 8 1/2 in (0.22 m) | 4.41 s | 1.53 s | 2.56 s | 4.17 s | 6.89 s | 35 in (0.89 m) | 10 ft 5 in (3.18 m) | 14 reps |
All values from NFL Scouting Combine/Pro Day

=== Denver Broncos ===
Webster was selected 90th overall by the Denver Broncos in the third round of the 2013 NFL draft.

In a win against the Dallas Cowboys in Week 5 of the 2013 season, Webster recorded his first career forced fumble, when he stripped the football from Dez Bryant, which was subsequently recovered by safety Duke Ihenacho. In the very next game against Jacksonville, Webster intercepted quarterback Chad Henne, to get the first interception of his career.

Webster played a key role in the special teams unit during the postseason. He received a game ball on January 17, 2016, after pinning Pittsburgh at the 3-yard line in Denver's 23-16 divisional round victory. Webster was a team captain in the AFC Championship, and the speedster continued to make an impact on special teams. He dove and scooped up a Britton Colquitt punt in front of the goal line that was downed at the New England 4-yard line, helping to preserve the victory. On February 7, 2016, Webster was part of the Broncos team that won Super Bowl 50. In the game, the Broncos defeated the Carolina Panthers by a score of 24–10. Webster was again a team captain and he played 26 snaps on defense. In addition, he was on the field for 78% of Denver's special teams plays, including tackling Ted Ginn after a Colquitt punt for a 1-yard loss.

Webster was placed on injured reserve on December 28, 2016, after suffering a concussion in Week 16.

=== Los Angeles Rams ===
On March 13, 2017, Webster signed a two-year contract with the Los Angeles Rams. He started 11 games in his first season as a Ram before suffering a ruptured Achilles in Week 14. He was placed on injured reserve on December 11, 2017.

On April 6, 2018, Webster was released by the Rams due to a failed physical.

=== Houston Texans ===
On August 27, 2018, Webster signed a one-year contract with the Houston Texans. He was placed on injured reserve on October 9, 2018, with a quadriceps injury. He was activated off injured reserve on December 22, 2018, but was placed back on reserve two days later after re-injuring his thigh.

=== New Orleans Saints ===
On June 10, 2019, Webster signed with the New Orleans Saints. He was released during final roster cuts on August 30, 2019.

=== Washington Redskins ===
The Washington Redskins signed Webster on December 17, 2019. He was released on March 23, 2020.

== NFL career statistics ==
Legend
| **Bold** | Career high |

=== Regular season ===
| Year | Team | Games | | Tackles | | | | | Interceptions | | | | | Fumbles | | | |
| Year | Team | GP | GS | Cmb | Solo | Ast | Sck | TFL | Int | Yds | TD | Lng | PD | FF | FR | Yds | TD |
|---|---|---|---|---|---|---|---|---|---|---|---|---|---|---|---|---|---|
| 2013 | DEN | 14 | 2 | **41** | **37** | **4** | 0.0 | **1** | **1** | **10** | 0 | **10** | **9** | **1** | 0 | 0 | 0 |
| 2014 | DEN | 12 | 0 | 23 | 22 | 1 | 0.0 | 0 | 0 | 0 | 0 | 0 | 2 | 0 | 0 | 0 | 0 |
| 2015 | DEN | **15** | 0 | 11 | 10 | 1 | 0.0 | 0 | 0 | 0 | 0 | 0 | 2 | 0 | 0 | 0 | 0 |
| 2016 | DEN | 13 | 0 | 8 | 7 | 1 | 0.0 | **1** | 0 | 0 | 0 | 0 | 1 | 0 | 0 | 0 | 0 |
| 2017 | LAR | 11 | **11** | 38 | 34 | **4** | 0.0 | 0 | **1** | 0 | 0 | 0 | 7 | 0 | 0 | 0 | 0 |
| 2018 | HOU | 2 | 2 | 1 | 1 | 0 | 0.0 | 0 | 0 | 0 | 0 | 0 | 0 | 0 | 0 | 0 | 0 |
| 2019 | WAS | 2 | 1 | 7 | 7 | 0 | 0.0 | **1** | 0 | 0 | 0 | 0 | 2 | 0 | 0 | 0 | 0 |
| | | 69 | 16 | 129 | 118 | 11 | 0.0 | 3 | 2 | 10 | 0 | 10 | 23 | 1 | 0 | 0 | 0 |

=== Playoffs ===
| Year | Team | Games | | Tackles | | | | | Interceptions | | | | | Fumbles | | | |
| Year | Team | GP | GS | Cmb | Solo | Ast | Sck | TFL | Int | Yds | TD | Lng | PD | FF | FR | Yds | TD |
|---|---|---|---|---|---|---|---|---|---|---|---|---|---|---|---|---|---|
| 2013 | DEN | **3** | 0 | 0 | 0 | 0 | 0.0 | 0 | 0 | 0 | 0 | 0 | 0 | 0 | 0 | 0 | 0 |
| 2014 | DEN | 1 | 0 | 0 | 0 | 0 | 0.0 | 0 | 0 | 0 | 0 | 0 | 0 | 0 | 0 | 0 | 0 |
| 2015 | DEN | **3** | 0 | **4** | **4** | 0 | 0.0 | 0 | 0 | 0 | 0 | 0 | **1** | 0 | 0 | 0 | 0 |
| | | 7 | 0 | 4 | 4 | 0 | 0.0 | 0 | 0 | 0 | 0 | 0 | 1 | 0 | 0 | 0 | 0 |
