= Vinston Painter =

American football player (born 1989)

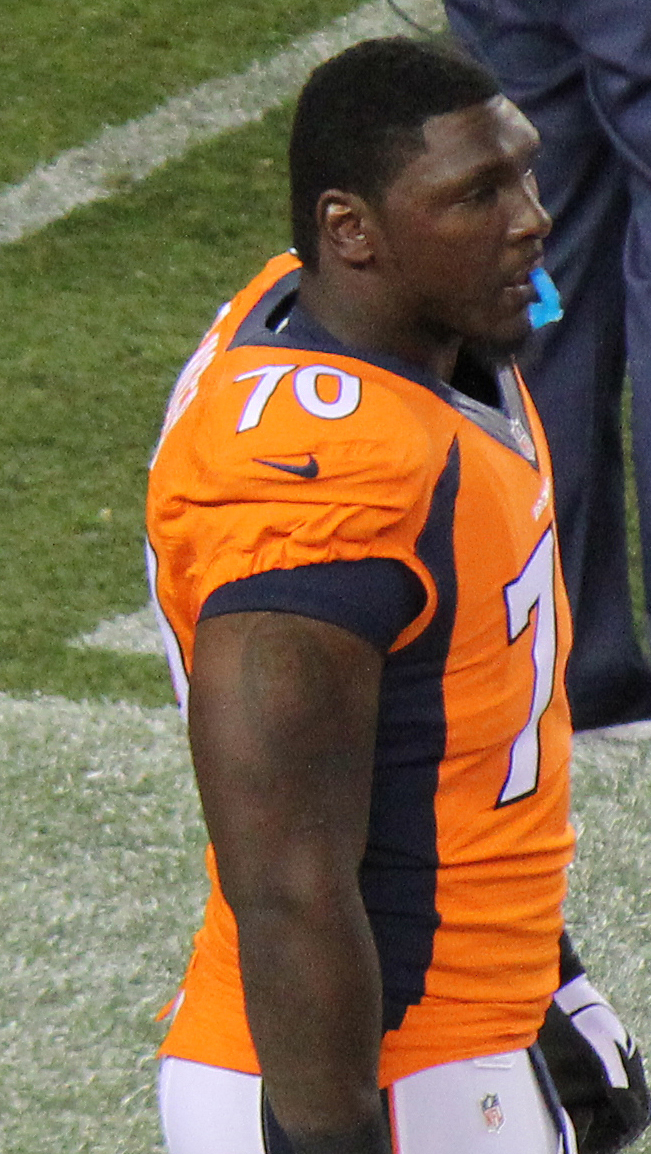
- Painter with the Denver Broncos in 2014

No. 69, 60, 78
- Position: Offensive tackle

Personal information
- Born: October 11, 1989 (age 37); Norfolk, Virginia, U.S.
- Listed height: 6 ft 4 in (1.93 m)
- Listed weight: 240 lb (109 kg)

Career information
- High school: Maury (Norfolk)
- College: Virginia Tech
- NFL draft: 2013: 6th round, 173rd overall pick

Career history
- Denver Broncos (2013–2014)*; Cleveland Browns (2014); New York Giants (2015)*; Miami Dolphins (2015–2016)*; Washington Redskins (2016); Arizona Cardinals (2017); Hamilton Tiger-Cats (2019)*
- * Offseason or practice squad member only

Career NFL statistics
- Games played: 14
- Stats at Pro Football Reference

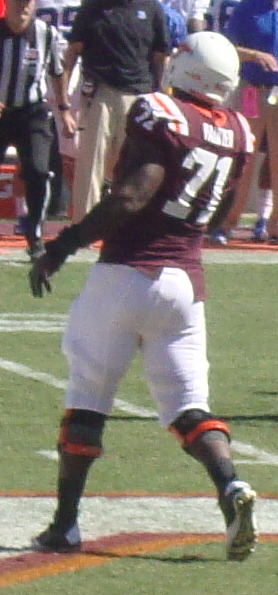
Painter with Virginia Tech in 2012

Vinston Eric Painter (born October 11, 1989) is an American former professional football player who was an offensive tackle in the National Football League (NFL) for the Cleveland Browns, Washington Redskins, and Arizona Cardinals. He played college football for the Virginia Tech Hokies and was selected by the Denver Broncos in the sixth round of the 2013 NFL draft.

== Professional career ==
Pre-draft measurables
Height	Weight	Arm length	Hand span	40-yard dash	10-yard split	20-yard split	20-yard shuttle	Three-cone drill	Vertical jump	Broad jump	Bench press
6 ft 4 1/2 in (1.94 m)	306 lb (139 kg)	34 in (0.86 m)	9 7/8 in (0.25 m)	4.87 s	1.73 s	2.78 s	4.56 s	7.71 s	30.5 in (0.77 m)	8 ft 1 in (2.46 m)	32 reps
All values from NFL Combine

=== Denver Broncos ===
Painter was selected in the sixth round, 173rd overall, by the Denver Broncos in the 2013 NFL draft. On August 31, 2013, he was released and was signed to the practice squad. He was promoted to the active roster on January 14, 2014.

On August 30, 2014, Painter was released by the Broncos and was signed to the practice squad the next day.

=== Cleveland Browns ===
On September 1, 2014, Painter was signed by the Cleveland Browns off the Broncos' practice squad.

On September 5, 2015, he was waived by the Browns.

=== New York Giants ===
On September 16, 2015, Painter was signed to the New York Giants' practice squad. On September 30, 2015, he was released by the Giants.

=== Miami Dolphins ===
On January 5, 2016, Painter signed with the Dolphins. On August 27, 2016, Painter was waived by the Dolphins.

=== Washington Redskins ===
Painter was claimed off waivers by the Washington Redskins on August 29, 2016. He was released by the team on September 3, 2016. The next day, the team signed him to their practice squad. On September 27, 2016, he was promoted to the active roster.

On February 28, 2017, Painter was tendered by the Redskins. He officially re-signed with the team on March 15. He was waived on September 2, 2017.

=== Arizona Cardinals ===
On September 14, 2017, Painter was signed to the Arizona Cardinals' practice squad. He was promoted to the active roster on September 30, 2017, but was waived three days later and re-signed back to the practice squad. He was promoted back to the active roster on November 16, 2017. He was waived on November 28, 2017, and was re-signed to the practice squad. On December 11, 2017, he was promoted to the active roster after Jared Veldheer suffered a season-ending ankle injury that resulted him being placed on injured reserve.

On September 1, 2018, Painter was released by the Cardinals.

=== Hamilton Tiger-Cats ===
Painter signed with the Hamilton Tiger-Cats of the Canadian Football League on March 20, 2019. He retired from professional football on May 15, 2019.
