= 2014 Denver Broncos season =

American football team season

- Owner: The Pat Bowlen Trust
- General manager: John Elway
- President: Joe Ellis
- Head coach: John Fox
- Offensive coordinator: Adam Gase
- Defensive coordinator: Jack Del Rio
- Home stadium: Sports Authority Field at Mile High

Results
- Record: 12–4
- Division place: 1st AFC West
- Playoffs: Lost Divisional Playoffs (vs. Colts) 13–24
- All-Pros: 3: WR Demaryius Thomas (2nd team); LB Von Miller (2nd team); CB Chris Harris, Jr. (2nd team)
- Pro Bowlers: 11: QB Peyton Manning; RB C. J. Anderson; WR Demaryius Thomas; WR Emmanuel Sanders; TE Julius Thomas; T Ryan Clady; DE DeMarcus Ware; OLB Von Miller; CB Aqib Talib; CB Chris Harris Jr.; S T. J. Ward

Uniform
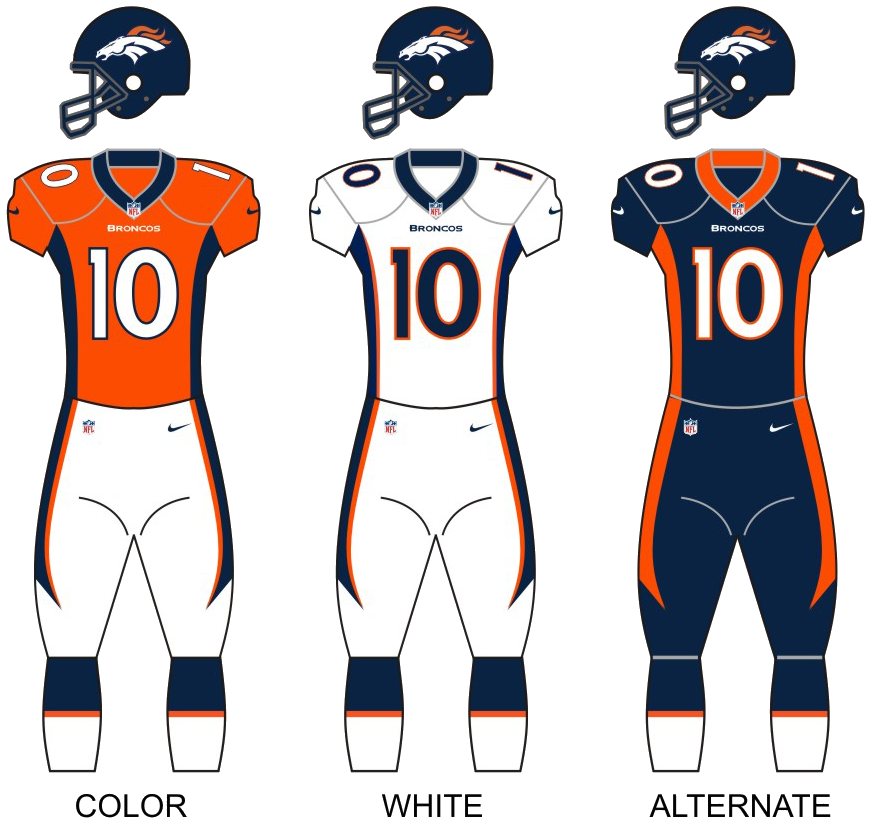

The 2014 season was the Denver Broncos' 45th in the National Football League (NFL) and their 55th overall. It also marked the third season with Peyton Manning as the team's starting quarterback.

The Broncos entered the 2014 season as the defending AFC champions, hoping to compete for another Super Bowl run, following a 43–8 loss to the Seattle Seahawks in Super Bowl XLVIII. The offseason was dominated by numerous roster changes, including the retirement of longtime cornerback Champ Bailey. One day before the start of the team's training camp, the Broncos announced that owner Pat Bowlen relinquished control of the team due to his battle with Alzheimer's disease.

Like the previous two seasons, the Broncos set numerous individual, league and franchise records, including wide receiver Demaryius Thomas setting a new franchise record for receiving yards in a single season, despite the team's offensive philosophy changing toward a run-oriented offense in the second half of the season. Manning threw a total of 39 touchdown passes, but only four came in the last four games of the regular season and the playoffs. In addition, Manning achieved only one 300-yard passing game within the team's last seven games (including the playoffs), courtesy of the emergence of running back C. J. Anderson, who achieved 1,282 all-purpose yards, the majority of which came in the second half of the regular season and the playoffs. One day after the Broncos' 24–13 playoff loss to the Indianapolis Colts in the Divisional round of the playoffs, media reports indicated that Manning had been playing with a strained quadriceps since a Week 15 game against the San Diego Chargers.

The Broncos swept their division, went undefeated at home, clinched their fourth consecutive AFC West division title, secured a first-round bye and the AFC's No. 2 seed, but lost in the Divisional round of the playoffs for the third time in four seasons.

This was also John Fox's final year as the Broncos' head coach after four seasons, as he mutually agreed to part ways with the team on January 12, 2015, due to poor playoff performances and a consistently poor passing defense in the playoffs during his tenure, including no playoff wins in 2012 and 2014, as well as suffering a blowout loss in Super Bowl XLVIII, as general manager John Elway felt the Broncos hadn't shown enough fight at critical times in the postseason.

== Coaching and front office changes ==
- March 11: James Cregg was hired as the team's offensive line assistant coach, while Bo Hardegree was hired as the offensive quality control coach. The team also announced that offensive line consultant Alex Gibbs will not return to the team.
- July 21: The Broncos announced that Adam Peters would replace Lenny McGill as the team's assistant director of college scouting. John Spytek, the team's director of college scouting, became a national scout.

=== Owner Pat Bowlen steps down ===
On July 23, one day before the start of the Broncos' training camp, owner Pat Bowlen relinquished control of the team due to his battle with Alzheimer's disease. Bowlen, who has served as the team's owner since 1984, had been privately battling the disease since 2009 after experiencing short-term memory loss, and had since taken a reduced role with the team, resulting in team president Joe Ellis and executive vice president/general manager John Elway making team decisions. Ellis and Elway assumed full control of the team, though Bowlen's long-term plan is for one of his seven children to run the team in the future, preventing a sale of the team.

== Roster changes ==
=== Free agents ===
Position	Player	Tag	2014 Team	Notes
S	Mike Adams	UFA	Indianapolis Colts	signed with the Colts on June 14
DE	Robert Ayers	UFA	New York Giants	signed with the Giants on April 2
G	Zane Beadles	UFA	Jacksonville Jaguars	signed with the Jaguars on March 11
LB	Stewart Bradley	UFA	None	
WR	Andre Caldwell	UFA	Denver Broncos	re-signed March 11
CB	Tony Carter	ERFA	Denver Broncos	assigned tender on March 7, re-signed April 21
CB	Marquice Cole	UFA	None	
WR	Eric Decker	UFA	New York Jets	signed with the Jets on March 12
CB	Chris Harris, Jr.	RFA	Denver Broncos	assigned tender on March 7, re-signed April 1
RS	Trindon Holliday	UFA	New York Giants	signed with the Giants on March 7
S	Michael Huff	UFA	None	
S	Duke Ihenacho	ERFA	Washington Redskins	assigned tender on March 7, re-signed April 21, waived August 30, claimed by the Redskins on August 31
CB	Quentin Jammer	UFA	None	
OT	Winston Justice	UFA	None	re-signed March 28, released August 24
C	Dan Koppen	UFA	None	
LB	Paris Lenon	UFA	None	
LB	Brandon Marshall	ERFA	Denver Broncos	assigned tender on March 7, re-signed April 21
DE	Jeremy Mincey	UFA	Dallas Cowboys	signed with the Cowboys on March 12
RB	Knowshon Moreno	UFA	Miami Dolphins	signed with the Dolphins on March 27
DE	Shaun Phillips	UFA	Tennessee Titans	signed with the Titans on March 27
CB	Dominique Rodgers-Cromartie	UFA	New York Giants	signed with the Giants on March 17
DT	Mitch Unrein	RFA	Denver Broncos	assigned tender on March 7, re-signed April 21
C	Steve Vallos	UFA	None	
LB	Wesley Woodyard	UFA	Tennessee Titans	signed with the Titans on March 14

=== Signings ===
Position	Player	2013 Team(s)	Notes
DT	Marvin Austin	Dallas Cowboys	signed May 5, on final roster
K	Connor Barth	None	signed November 25, on final roster
S	Josh Bush	New York Jets	promoted from the Broncos' practice squad on December 18, on final roster
LB	Todd Davis	New Orleans Saints	signed November 13, on final roster
TE	Dominique Jones	Practice squad	promoted from the practice squad on December 13, waived December 16, re-signed December 18, on final roster
S	Charles Mitchell	None	signed May 19, waived August 24
DT	Cody Larsen	Baltimore Ravens	signed July 30, waived August 25
C	Will Montgomery	Washington Redskins	signed April 1, on final roster
WR	Nathan Palmer	Practice squad	signed September 3, waived September 9, assigned to the practice squad on September 11
DE	Will Pericak	Jacksonville Jaguars	signed July 30, waived August 24
WR	Emmanuel Sanders	Pittsburgh Steelers	signed March 16, on final roster
DE	Brian Sanford	Oakland Raiders; Cleveland Browns	signed August 5, released August 30
RB	Jeremy Stewart	Oakland Raiders	promoted from the Broncos' practice squad on November 22, on final roster
CB	Aqib Talib	New England Patriots	signed March 11, on final roster
S	T. J. Ward	Cleveland Browns	signed March 11, on final roster
LB	Chase Vaughn	Spokane Shock (AFL)	signed May 19, waived August 24
DE	DeMarcus Ware	Dallas Cowboys	signed March 12, on final roster

Indicates that the player was a free agent at the end of his respective team's 2013 season.

=== Departures ===
Position	Player	Notes
CB	Champ Bailey	released March 6
TE	Joel Dreessen	released July 22, following a failed physical exam
QB	Zac Dysert	released August 30, assigned to the practice squad on August 31
G	Chris Kuper	retired on March 10
OT	Vinston Painter	waived August 30, assigned to the practice squad on August 31, signed by the Cleveland Browns on September 2
PK	Matt Prater	released October 3
DT	Kevin Vickerson	released August 30
DE	John Youboty	designated as waived/injured on May 19

=== Trades ===
On August 26, the Broncos acquired placekicker Brandon McManus in a trade that sent a conditional 2015 seventh-round draft selection to the New York Giants; the trade became official on October 3 when original placekicker Matt Prater was released three days before his four-game suspension for violating the league's substance-abuse policy would have ended. However, McManus was waived on November 25 due to his inconsistency (9-of-13 on field goal attempts), and replaced by former Tampa Bay Buccaneers' placekicker Connor Barth. McManus was later re-signed to the Broncos' practice squad on December 4 due to concerns regarding Barth's kickoff lengths. Two days later (December 6), McManus was promoted to the active roster.

=== Draft ===
2014 Denver Broncos Draft
Round	Selection	Player	Position	College	Notes
1	31	Bradley Roby	CB	Ohio State	signed June 10
2	56	Cody Latimer	WR	Indiana	signed June 2
3	95	Michael Schofield	OT	Michigan	signed June 3
4	None – see draft trades below				
5	156	Lamin Barrow	LB	Louisiana State	signed June 3
6	207	Matt Paradis	C	Boise State	signed June 2, waived August 30, assigned to the practice squad on August 31
7	242	Corey Nelson	LB	Oklahoma	signed June 2

Draft trades

Trade partner	Broncos give	Broncos receive	Source
Chicago Bears	2014 fourth-round selection (No. 131) original 2014 seventh-round selection (No. 246)	2014 fifth-round selection (No. 156); 2015 fifth-round selection	
San Francisco 49ers	original 2014 second-round selection (No. 63) original 2014 fifth-round selection (No. 171); 2015 fourth-round selection	2014 second-round selection (No. 56); 2014 seventh-round selection (No. 242)	

=== Undrafted free agents ===
All undrafted free agents were signed after the 2014 NFL draft concluded on May 10, unless noted otherwise.

2014 Denver Broncos undrafted free agents
Player	Position	College	Notes
DE	Kenny Anunike	Duke	placed on injured reserve August 30
LB	Shaquil Barrett	Colorado State	waived August 30, assigned to the practice squad on August 31, promoted to the active roster on October 15, waived October 20, assigned to the practice squad on October 22, promoted to the active roster on January 10, 2015, on final roster
RB	Kapri Bibbs	Colorado State	waived August 30, assigned to the practice squad on August 31, promoted to the active roster on October 20, waived November 22, assigned to the practice squad on November 25
WR	Isaiah Burse	Fresno State	made the 53-man roster, waived December 6, assigned to the practice squad on December 8
P	Steven Clark	Auburn	waived May 19
RB	Brennan Clay	Oklahoma	waived August 24
DT	Mister Cobble	Kentucky	waived May 19
PK	Mitch Ewald	Indiana	signed July 23, waived August 26
WR	Bennie Fowler	Michigan State	waived August 30, assigned to the practice squad on August 31
WR	Greg Hardin	North Dakota	signed May 19, waived August 24
DE	Greg Latta	Purdue	waived August 20
QB	Bryn Renner	North Carolina	waived August 24
OT	Aslam Sterling	Kansas	waived July 28
CB	Jordan Sullen	Tulane	waived August 30
RB	Juwan Thompson	Duke	on final roster
LB	Chase Vaughn	CSU–Pueblo	signed May 19, designated as waived/injured on August 24
CB	Louis Young	Georgia Tech	waived August 30

=== Suspensions ===
==== Matt Prater ====
On August 23, placekicker Matt Prater was suspended for the first four games of the season for violating the league's substance-abuse policy. Prater had been charged with drunk driving on two previous occasions – January 2008 in Orlando, Florida, and August 2011 in Denver, Colorado. Following the latter transgression, Prater was placed in the league's alcohol program, and Prater acknowledged that he consumed three beers while on vacation during the off-season – a violation of the league's alcohol program. The NFL initially threatened a one-year suspension, but with the aid of Prater's attorney, Harvey Steinberg, his suspension was negotiated to four games. Undrafted rookie Mitch Ewald was expected to fill in placekicker duties while Prater served his suspension, however, on August 26, Ewald was waived and the Broncos acquired Brandon McManus in a trade that sent a 2015 seventh-round draft selection to the New York Giants. The trade was contingent upon McManus remaining on the Broncos' active roster after the end of Prater's suspension. On October 3, the Broncos decided to stick with McManus and released Prater three days before his suspension would have ended. On October 7, Prater signed with the Detroit Lions.

==== Wes Welker ====
On September 2, wide receiver Wes Welker was initially suspended for the first four games of the season for testing positive for the amphetamine Adderall, a violation of the league's substance-abuse policy. Welker denied reports that he took MDMA (also known as "Molly") that had been laced with amphetamines, while attending a Kentucky Derby race during the off-season. However, on September 17, after missing the first two games of the season, Welker's suspension was overturned after the NFL and the NFL Player's Association came to an agreement on a new drug policy. Under the revised policy, Welker's violation places him on a probationary period for first-time violators.

=== Injuries ===
- August 28: Undrafted rookie defensive end Kenny Anunike injured his elbow during the team's final preseason game against the Dallas Cowboys, and was placed on injured reserve two days later (August 30).
- September 14: Linebacker Lerentee McCray missed three games after suffering a sprained knee ligament during the team's Week 2 win over the Kansas City Chiefs.
- November 2: Linebacker Nate Irving suffered a serious knee injury during the Broncos' Week 9 loss to the New England Patriots. An MRI test on November 3 determined that Irving suffered ligament damage, and the team placed him on the season-ending injured reserve ten days later (November 13).
- November 9: Running back Ronnie Hillman suffered a sprained foot during the Broncos' Week 10 win over the Oakland Raiders, and missed the team's next six games.
- November 16: Tight end Julius Thomas suffered a sprained ankle during the Broncos' Week 11 loss to the St. Louis Rams, and missed the team's next three games.
- November 23: Cornerback Aqib Talib suffered a strained hamstring during the Broncos' Week 12 win over the Miami Dolphins, and missed the team's Week 13 win over the Kansas City Chiefs.
- December 13: Safety Quinton Carter was placed on injured reserve, after experiencing pain in his knee. Carter played in 11 of the team's first 12 games this season, after missing the 2012 and 2013 seasons with a knee injury.
- December 14: Linebacker Brandon Marshall suffered a Lisfranc sprain in his right foot during the team's Week 15 win over the San Diego Chargers, and missed the Broncos last two regular season games, but returned for the team's Divisional playoff game vs. the Indianapolis Colts on January 11, 2015.
- December 23: Safety T. J. Ward suffered a sprained neck during the team's Week 16 loss to the Cincinnati Bengals, and missed the Week 17 regular season finale against the Oakland Raiders.
- January 10: Defensive end Quanterus Smith was placed on Injured reserve due to a knee injury, one day prior to the Broncos' Divisional playoff game vs. the Indianapolis Colts.

Montee Ball

Running back Montee Ball was twice sidelined with a groin injury. On October 5, Ball suffered a strained groin during the team's Week 5 win over the Arizona Cardinals, and missed the team's next five games. On November 16, during the Broncos' Week 11 loss to the St. Louis Rams, Ball re-aggravated the injury, and was placed on injured reserve on December 13.

Danny Trevathan

Linebacker Danny Trevathan was sidelined with injuries to his left kneecap on three different occasions. On August 12, prior to the Broncos' second preseason game, Trevathan suffered a fractured left kneecap during practice, and missed the first three games of the regular season. On October 12, during the Broncos' Week 6 win over the New York Jets, Trevathan suffered the same injury to his left knee. Two days later (October 14), Trevathan was placed on the injured reserve list with a designation to return, in which he missed eight weeks, and was moved to the active roster on December 13, one day before the team's Week 15 game against the San Diego Chargers. However, Trevathan suffered a dislocation of his kneecap during the team's Week 15 win over the Chargers, and was placed on the season-ending injured reserve on December 16.

== Staff ==
2014 Denver Broncos staff
Front office: Owner – The Pat Bowlen Trust; President/chairman/CEO – Joe Ellis; Executive vice president of football operations/general manager – John Elway; Director of football administration – Mike Sullivan; Director of player personnel – Matt Russell; Director of pro personnel – Tom Heckert Jr.; Assistant director of pro personnel – Anthony Kelly; Assistant director of college scouting – Adam Peters; Director of player development – Jerry Butler; Head coaches: Head coach – John Fox; Offensive coaches: Offensive coordinator – Adam Gase; Quarterbacks – Greg Knapp; Running backs – Eric Studesville; Wide receivers – Tyke Tolbert; Tight ends – Clancy Barone; Offensive line – Dave Magazu; Assistant offensive line – James Cregg; Offensive assistant – Brian Callahan; Offensive quality control – Bo Hardegree	Defensive coaches: Defensive coordinator – Jack Del Rio; Defensive line – Jay Rodgers; Linebackers – Richard Smith; Defensive backs – Cory Undlin; Assistant secondary/safeties – Sam Garnes; Defensive assistant – Chris Beake; Special teams coaches: Special teams coordinator – Jeff Rodgers; Assistant special teams – Derius Swinton II; Strength and conditioning: Strength and conditioning – Luke Richesson; Assistant strength and conditioning – Mike Eubanks; Assistant strength and conditioning – Jason George; Assistant strength and conditioning – Anthony Lomando

== Final roster ==
2014 Denver Broncos roster
Quarterbacks (QB): 18 Peyton Manning; 17 Brock Osweiler; Running backs (RB): 22 C. J. Anderson; 23 Ronnie Hillman; 27 Jeremy Stewart; 40 Juwan Thompson; Wide receivers (WR): 12 Andre Caldwell; 14 Cody Latimer; 10 Emmanuel Sanders; 88 Demaryius Thomas; 83 Wes Welker PR; Tight ends (TE): 85 Virgil Green; 86 Dominique Jones; 84 Jacob Tamme; 80 Julius Thomas	Offensive linemen (OL): 78 Ryan Clady T; 75 Chris Clark T; 71 Paul Cornick T; 74 Orlando Franklin G; 63 Ben Garland G; 64 Will Montgomery C; 66 Manny Ramirez C/G; 79 Michael Schofield T; 65 Louis Vasquez G/T; Defensive linemen (DL): 76 Marvin Austin DT; 97 Malik Jackson DT/DE; 98 Terrance Knighton DT; 93 Quanterus Smith DE; 96 Mitch Unrein DT; 94 DeMarcus Ware DE; 92 Sylvester Williams DT; 95 Derek Wolfe DE	Linebackers (LB): 57 Lamin Barrow MLB; 51 Todd Davis OLB; 53 Steven Johnson MLB; 54 Brandon Marshall OLB; 55 Lerentee McCray OLB; 58 Von Miller OLB; 52 Corey Nelson OLB; Defensive backs (DB): 31 Omar Bolden CB; 30 David Bruton SS; 20 Josh Bush FS; 32 Tony Carter CB; 25 Chris Harris Jr. CB; 26 Rahim Moore FS; 29 Bradley Roby CB; 21 Aqib Talib CB; 43 T. J. Ward SS; 36 Kayvon Webster CB; Special teams (ST): 1 Connor Barth K; 46 Aaron Brewer LS; 4 Britton Colquitt P; 8 Brandon McManus K	Practice squad: 50 Shaquil Barrett LB; 35 Kapri Bibbs RB; 19 Isaiah Burse WR; 2 Zac Dysert QB; 16 Bennie Fowler WR; 67 Jon Halapio G; 72 DeMarcus Love T; 13 Nathan Palmer WR; 61 Matt Paradis C; 99 Gerald Rivers DE; Reserve: 91 Kenny Anunike DE (IR); 28 Montee Ball RB (IR); 38 Quinton Carter SS (IR); 56 Nate Irving MLB (IR); 11 Jordan Norwood WR (IR); 59 Danny Trevathan OLB (IR); 90 John Youboty DE (IR); Rookies in italics 53 active, 7 reserve, 10 practice squad

== Preseason ==
Week	Date	Opponent	Result	Record	Venue	Recap
1	August 7	Seattle Seahawks	W 21–16	1–0	Sports Authority Field at Mile High	Recap
2	August 17	at San Francisco 49ers	W 34–0	2–0	Levi's Stadium	Recap
3	August 23	Houston Texans	L 17–18	2–1	Sports Authority Field at Mile High	Recap
4	August 28	at Dallas Cowboys	W 27–3	3–1	AT&T Stadium	Recap

== Regular season ==
=== Schedule ===
Week	Date	Opponent	Result	Record	Venue	Recap
1	September 7	Indianapolis Colts	**W** 31–24	1–0	Sports Authority Field at Mile High	Recap
2	September 14	**Kansas City Chiefs**	**W** 24–17	2–0	Sports Authority Field at Mile High	Recap
3	September 21	at Seattle Seahawks	**L** 20–26 (OT)	2–1	CenturyLink Field	Recap
4	Bye					
5	October 5	Arizona Cardinals	**W** 41–20	3–1	Sports Authority Field at Mile High	Recap
6	October 12	at New York Jets	**W** 31–17	4–1	MetLife Stadium	Recap
7	October 19	San Francisco 49ers	**W** 42–17	5–1	Sports Authority Field at Mile High	Recap
8	October 23	**San Diego Chargers**	**W** 35–21	6–1	Sports Authority Field at Mile High	Recap
9	November 2	at New England Patriots	**L** 21–43	6–2	Gillette Stadium	Recap
10	November 9	at **Oakland Raiders**	**W** 41–17	7–2	O.co Coliseum	Recap
11	November 16	at St. Louis Rams	**L** 7–22	7–3	Edward Jones Dome	Recap
12	November 23	Miami Dolphins	**W** 39–36	8–3	Sports Authority Field at Mile High	Recap
13	November 30	at **Kansas City Chiefs**	**W** 29–16	9–3	Arrowhead Stadium	Recap
14	December 7	Buffalo Bills	**W** 24–17	10–3	Sports Authority Field at Mile High	Recap
15	December 14	at **San Diego Chargers**	**W** 22–10	11–3	Qualcomm Stadium	Recap
16	December 22	at Cincinnati Bengals	**L** 28–37	11–4	Paul Brown Stadium	Recap
17	December 28	**Oakland Raiders**	**W** 47–14	12–4	Sports Authority Field at Mile High	Recap

Note: Intra-division opponents are in bold text.

=== Game summaries ===
==== Week 1: vs. Indianapolis Colts ====
Week One: Indianapolis Colts at Denver Broncos – Game summary

Quarter	1	2	3	4	Total
Colts	0	7	3	14	**24**
**Broncos**	3	21	0	7	**31**

at Sports Authority Field at Mile High, Denver, Colorado

- Date: September 7
- Game time: 6:30 p.m. MDT
- Game weather: 75 °F (24 °C), mostly cloudy
- Game attendance: 76,939
- Referee: Tony Corrente
- TV announcers (NBC): Al Michaels, Cris Collinsworth and Michele Tafoya
- Recap, Gamebook

Game information

**First quarter**

- DEN – 5:14 Brandon McManus 21-yard FG. Drive: 16 plays, 77 yards, 6:35. (DEN 3–0)

**Second quarter**

- DEN – 14:14 Julius Thomas 3-yard TD pass from Peyton Manning, Brandon McManus kick. Drive: 8-54, 4:00. (DEN 10–0)
- DEN – 6:41 Julius Thomas 35-yard TD pass from Peyton Manning, Brandon McManus kick. Drive: 9 plays, 83, yards, 5:24. (DEN 17–0)
- DEN – 1:57 Julius Thomas 5-yard TD pass from Peyton Manning, Brandon McManus kick. Drive: 7 plays, 71 yards, 3:13. (DEN 24–0)
- IND – 0:19 Andrew Luck 9-yard TD run, Adam Vinatieri kick. Drive: 8 plays, 80 yards, 1:38. (DEN 24–7)

**Third quarter**

- IND – 1:31 Adam Vinatieri 25-yard FG. Drive: 11 plays, 60 yards, 5:58. (DEN 24–10)

**Fourth quarter**

- DEN – 9:54 Montee Ball 3-yard TD run, Brandon McManus kick. Drive: 6 plays, 48 yards, 3:31. (DEN 31–10)
- IND – 7:46 Dwayne Allen 41-yard TD pass from Andrew Luck, Adam Vinatieri kick. Drive: 7 plays, 80 yards, 2:08. (DEN 31–17)
- IND – 3:26 Hakeem Nicks 9-yard TD pass from Andrew Luck, Adam Vinatieri kick. Drive: 5 plays, 45 yards, 0:49. **(DEN 31–24)**

**Top passers**

- IND – Andrew Luck: 35/53, 370 yards, 2 TD (1 rushing), 2 INT
- DEN – Peyton Manning: 22/36, 269 yards, 3 TD

**Top rushers**

- IND – Trent Richardson: 6 rushes, 20 yards
- DEN – Montee Ball: 23 rushes, 67 yards, 1 TD

**Top receivers**

- IND – Reggie Wayne: 9 receptions, 98 yards
- DEN – Julius Thomas: 7 receptions, 104 yards, 3 TD

**Top tacklers**

- IND – LaRon Landry: 7 tackles, 1 assist
- DEN – Brandon Marshall and Bradley Roby: 7 tackles each (2 assists by Marshall)

The Broncos kicked off their 2014 season against the Indianapolis Colts on NBC's Sunday Night Football. A 21-yard field goal by Broncos' placekicker Brandon McManus was the only scoring play of the first quarter. In the second quarter, the Broncos increased their lead to 24–0, with quarterback Peyton Manning throwing three touchdown passes to tight end Julius Thomas – a 3-yarder, a 35-yarder and a 5-yarder. The Colts got on the scoreboard just before halftime, with quarterback Andrew Luck rushing for a 9-yard touchdown. On the Colts' first offensive possession of the second half, the Broncos' defense made a goal-line stand, as linebacker Brandon Marshall snuffed out Luck's attempt of a quarterback sneak on 4th-and-goal. Colts' placekicker Adam Vinatieri added a 25-yard field goal later in the third quarter. The Broncos increased their lead to 31–10 with 9:54 remaining in the fourth quarter, with running back Montee Ball rushing for a 3-yard touchdown. The Colts responded on their next possession, with Luck connecting on a 41-yard touchdown pass to wide receiver Dwayne Allen to pull within 31–17 midway through the fourth quarter. The Colts subsequently recovered an onside kick, however, eight plays later, Luck was intercepted by Broncos' safety Rahim Moore deep in Broncos' territory. The Broncos' offense forced the Colts to burn two of their three team timeouts on their next possession, but went three-and-out. The Colts pulled to within 31–24 with 3:32 remaining in the game, with Luck throwing a 9-yard touchdown pass to wide receiver Hakeem Nicks. The Broncos' offense subsequently went three-and-out on their next possession, and were forced to punt with three minutes left in the game. The Colts attempted a rally, however, Broncos' cornerback Bradley Roby broke up a 4th-down pass from Luck that was intended for wide receiver Reggie Wayne on the first play after the two-minute warning. The Broncos' offense subsequently ran out the clock.

==== Week 2: vs. Kansas City Chiefs ====
Week Two: Kansas City Chiefs at Denver Broncos – Game summary

Quarter	1	2	3	4	Total
Chiefs	3	7	0	7	**17**
**Broncos**	7	14	0	3	**24**

at Sports Authority Field at Mile High, Denver, Colorado

- Date: September 14
- Game time: 2:25 pm. MDT
- Game weather: 85 °F (29 °C), partly cloudy
- Game attendance: 76,900
- Referee: Gene Steratore
- TV announcers (CBS): Jim Nantz, Phil Simms and Tracy Wolfson
- Recap, Gamebook

Game information

**First quarter**

- DEN – Julius Thomas 4-yard pass from Peyton Manning (Brandon McManus kick), 11:24. Broncos 7–0. **Drive: 7 plays, 80 yards, 3:41.**
- KC – Cairo Santos 45-yard field goal, 2:07. Broncos 7–3. **Drive: 6 plays, 33 yards, 2:21.**

**Second quarter**

- KC – Knile Davis 2-yard run (Cairo Santos kick), 10:36. Chiefs 10–7. **Drive: 10 plays, 66 yards, 4:32.**
- DEN – Jacob Tamme 4-yard pass from Peyton Manning (Brandon McManus kick), 7:24. Broncos 14–10. **Drive: 7 plays, 75 yards, 3:13.**
- DEN – Demaryius Thomas 12-yard pass from Peyton Manning (Brandon McManus kick), 1:15. Broncos 21–10. **Drive: 11 plays, 88 yards, 4:26.**

**Third quarter**

- No scoring plays.

**Fourth quarter**

- KC – Knile Davis 4-yard run (Cairo Santos kick), 7:15. Broncos 21–17. **Drive: 14 plays, 90 yards, 7:42.**
- DEN – Brandon McManus 20-yard field goal, 3:30. Broncos 24–17. **Drive: 7 plays, 44 yards, 3:44.**

**Top passers**

- KC – Alex Smith – 26/42, 255 yards
- DEN – Peyton Manning – 21/26, 242 yards, 3 TD

**Top rushers**

- KC – Knile Davis – 22 rushes, 79 yards, 2 TD
- DEN – Montee Ball – 12 rushes, 60 yards

**Top receivers**

- KC – Travis Kelce – 4 receptions, 81 yards
- DEN – Emmanuel Sanders – 8 receptions, 108 yards

**Top tacklers**

- KC – Ron Parker – 7 tackles
- DEN – Nate Irving – 7 tackles, 4 assists

Coming off their season-opening win over the Colts, the Broncos remained on home ground for an AFC West duel against the Kansas City Chiefs. The Broncos grabbed the lead on the game's opening drive, with quarterback Peyton Manning throwing a 4-yard touchdown pass to tight end Julius Thomas. The Chiefs got on the scoreboard later in the first quarter, with a 45-yard field goal by placekicker Cairo Santos, then took the lead early in the second quarter, with a 2-yard touchdown run by running back Knile Davis. The Broncos re-claimed the lead on their next offensive possession, with Manning connecting on a 4-yard touchdown pass to tight end Jacob Tamme, then added to their lead just before halftime, with a 12-yard touchdown pass from Manning to wide receiver Demaryius Thomas.

The Chiefs got the opening possession of the second half, with a time-consuming drive that took them to as far as the Broncos' 4-yard line, but were backed up 10 yards by an offensive holding penalty and a 5-yard sack of quarterback Alex Smith by Broncos' linebacker Brandon Marshall. Santos subsequently missed a 37-yard field goal to end a drive that chewed up the first 10 minutes of the third quarter. The Broncos were forced to punt on their next possession, and the Chiefs narrowed the Broncos' lead to 21–17 midway through the fourth quarter with another time-consuming drive, culminating with a 4-yard touchdown run by Davis. The Broncos drove down the field on their next possession, but had to settle on a 20-yard field by placekicker Brandon McManus to extend their lead to 24–17 with 3:30 remaining in the fourth quarter.

Three plays into the Chiefs' next possession, Smith was intercepted by Broncos' cornerback Aqib Talib, who returned the football 41 yards for a touchdown; however, the interception return was nullified by an offside penalty on defensive end Quanterus Smith. The Chiefs' earned one first down prior to the two-minute warning. On the second play after the two-minute warning, Broncos' defensive end DeMarcus Ware forced a fumble off Smith; however, it was ruled an incomplete pass following a replay review. On the next play, Smith connected on a 21-yard pass to wide receiver Dwayne Bowe, and was pushed out of bounds at the Broncos' 9-yard line by cornerback Chris Harris, Jr. with 1:51 remaining in the game. Three plays later, after burning their last timeout, the Chiefs were facing a 3rd-and-goal at the Broncos' 4-yard line; however, an offside call against Ware moved the ball half the distance to the goal line, with 1:04 remaining in the game. Davis subsequently attempted a run up the middle, but was tackled for no gain at the 2-yard line by Ware and linebacker Nate Irving. On the Chiefs' final offensive play, Smith's pass intended for Bowe on 4th-and-goal was broken up by Broncos' defensive tackle Terrance Knighton. Manning subsequently kneeled down to run out the clock.

Notes

During halftime, the Broncos made three additions to their Ring of Fame: Gene Mingo, who played multiple positions with the Broncos from 1960 to 1964; Dan Reeves, who coached the Broncos from 1981 to 1992 and led the team to three Super Bowl appearances in 1986, 1987 and 1989; wide receiver Rick Upchurch, who played with the Broncos from 1975 to 1983.

==== Week 3: at Seattle Seahawks ====
Week Three: Denver Broncos at Seattle Seahawks – Game summary

Quarter	1	2	3	4	OT	Total
Broncos	3	0	0	17	0	**20**
**Seahawks**	3	14	0	3	6	**26**

at CenturyLink Field, Seattle, Washington

- Date: September 21
- Game time: 2:25 pm. MDT/1:25 p.m. PDT
- Game weather: 70 °F (21 °C), sunny
- Game attendance: 68,447
- Referee: Bill Vinovich
- TV announcers (CBS): Jim Nantz, Phil Simms and Tracy Wolfson
- Recap, Gamebook

Game information

**First quarter**

- SEA – 10:33 Steven Hauschka 20-yard FG. Drive: 5 plays, 21 yards, 2:50. (SEA 3–0)
- DEN – 3:27 Brandon McManus 24-yard FG. Drive: 15 plays, 75 yards, 7:06. (tied 3–3)

**Second quarter**

- SEA – 3:05 Ricardo Lockette 39-yard TD pass from Russell Wilson, Steven Hauschka kick. Drive: 4 plays, 73 yards, 2:22. (SEA 10–3)
- SEA – 0:12 Marshawn Lynch 5-yard TD pass from Russell Wilson, Steven Hauschka kick. Drive: 10 plays, 68 yards, 2:26. (SEA 17–3)

**Third quarter**

- No scoring plays

**Fourth quarter**

- DEN – 13:07 Nate Irving and T. J. Ward tackled Marshawn Lynch in the end zone for a safety. (SEA 17–5)
- DEN – 9:20 Julius Thomas 3-yard TD pass from Peyton Manning, Brandon McManus kick. Drive: 5 plays, 19 yards, 1:42. (SEA 17–12)
- SEA – 0:59 Steven Hauschka 28-yard FG. Drive: 5 plays, 25 yards, 1:13. (SEA 20–12)
- DEN – 0:18 Jacob Tamme 26-yard TD pass from Peyton Manning, Peyton Manning pass to Demaryius Thomas for a two-point conversion. Drive: 6 plays, 80 yards, 0:41. (tied 20–20)

**Overtime**

- SEA – 9:14 Marshawn Lynch 6-yard TD run. Drive: 13 plays, 80 yards, 5:46. **(SEA 26–20)**

**Top passers**

- DEN – Peyton Manning: 31/49, 303 yards, 2 TD, 1 INT
- SEA – Russell Wilson: 24/34, 258 yards, 2 TD, 1 INT

**Top rushers**

- DEN – Montee Ball: 14 rushes, 38 yards
- SEA – Marshawn Lynch: 26 rushes, 88 yards, 1 rushing TD, 1 receiving TD

**Top receivers**

- DEN – Emmanuel Sanders: 11 receptions, 149 yards
- SEA – Doug Baldwin: 4 receptions, 56 yards

**Top tacklers**

- DEN – Bradley Roby, Brandon Marshall and Aqib Talib: 5 tackles each (1 assist by Talib, 7 assists by Marshall)
- SEA – Byron Maxwell: 9 tackles, 2 assists

Coming off back-to-back home wins to start the season, the Broncos traveled to CenturyLink Field for an interconference duel against the Seattle Seahawks, hoping to avenge their 43–8 blowout loss to the Seahawks in Super Bowl XLVIII. On the Broncos' first possession, Seahawks' safety Kam Chancellor forced a fumble off running back Montee Ball deep in Broncos' territory. The ensuing Seahawks' drive culminated in placekicker Steven Hauschka settling for a 20-yard field goal. The Broncos drove down the field on their next possession, but had to settle for a 24-yard field goal by placekicker Brandon McManus. Both teams traded punts on their next two possessions, until the Seahawks re-claimed the lead late in the second quarter, with a 39-yard touchdown pass from quarterback Russell Wilson to wide receiver Ricardo Lockette, then added to their lead with a 5-yard touchdown pass from Wilson to running back Marshawn Lynch just before halftime.

After a scoreless third quarter, which included Broncos' defensive tackle Terrance Knighton blocking a 46-yard field goal attempt by Hauschka, Britton Colquitt sent a punt that backed up the Seahawks to their own 8-yard line to begin the fourth quarter. Three plays later, Lynch was tackled in the end zone by linebacker Nate Irving and cornerback Aqib Talib for a Broncos' safety to narrow the Seahawks' lead to 17–5. The Broncos were forced to punt on their first possession of the fourth quarter, and on the Seahawks' next possession, Wilson was intercepted by cornerback Chris Harris, Jr., who advanced the football to the Seahawks' 19-yard line. Five plays later, the Broncos' offense finally got into the end zone, with quarterback Peyton Manning connecting on a 3-yard touchdown pass to tight end Julius Thomas. The Seahawks were forced to punt on their next possession, and the Broncos' offense got the football with 6:07 remaining in the fourth quarter. On the ninth play of the drive, the Broncos were facing a 3rd-and-11 at the Seahawks' 24-yard line, however, a Manning pass intended for wide receiver Wes Welker was intercepted by Chancellor, who advance all the way to the Broncos' 35-yard line. Five plays later, Hauschka made a 28-yard field goal to increase the Seahawks' lead to 20–12, with 1:04 remaining in the fourth quarter.

With no timeouts remaining, Manning engineered an 80-yard drive in only 35 seconds, which included two key pass completions – a 42-yarder to wide receiver Emmanuel Sanders and a 12-yarder to wide receiver Demaryius Thomas. On the sixth play of the drive, Manning completed a 26-yard touchdown pass to tight end Jacob Tamme, coupled with a two-point conversion pass from Manning to wide receiver Demaryius Thomas to send the game into overtime, tied at 20–20. However, the Seahawks won the overtime coin toss, and methodically marched down the field with a 13-play, 80-yard drive, culminating in a game-winning 6-yard touchdown run by Lynch to end the game.

==== Week 5: vs. Arizona Cardinals ====
Week Five: Arizona Cardinals at Denver Broncos – Game summary

Quarter	1	2	3	4	Total
Cardinals	6	7	7	0	**20**
**Broncos**	7	14	3	17	**41**

at Sports Authority Field at Mile High, Denver, Colorado

- Date: October 5
- Game time: 2:05 pm. MDT
- Game weather: 71 °F (22 °C), sunny
- Game attendance: 76,895
- Referee: Bill Leavy
- TV announcers (Fox): Joe Buck, Troy Aikman and Erin Andrews
- Recap, Gamebook

Game information

**First quarter**

- ARI – 9:09 Chandler Catanzaro 33-yard FG. Drive: 12 plays, 65 yards, 5:51. (ARI 3–0)
- DEN – 4:43 Julius Thomas 7-yard TD pass from Peyton Manning, Brandon McManus kick. Drive: 12 plays, 80 yards, 4:26. (DEN 7–3)
- ARI – 1:41 Chandler Catanzaro 48-yard FG. Drive: 10 plays, 50 yards, 3:02. (DEN 7–6)

**Second quarter**

- DEN – 7:30 Demaryius Thomas 31-yard TD pass from Peyton Manning, Brandon McManus kick. Drive: 7 plays, 80 yards, 3:13. (DEN 14–6)
- ARI – 4:37 Andre Ellington 5-yard TD run, Chandler Catanzaro kick. Drive: 1 play, 5 yards, 0:05. (DEN 14–13)
- DEN – 1:37 Demaryius Thomas 86-yard TD pass from Peyton Manning, Brandon McManus kick. Drive: 1 play, 86 yards, 0:11. (DEN 21–13)

**Third quarter**

- DEN – 9:33 Brandon McManus 44-yard FG. Drive: 7 plays, 45 yards, 2:32. (DEN 24–13)
- ARI – 3:03 Andre Ellington 81-yard TD pass from Logan Thomas, Chandler Catanzaro kick. Drive: 1 play, 81 yards, 0:13. (DEN 24–20)

**Fourth quarter**

- DEN – 13:48 Brandon McManus 41-yard FG. Drive: 8 plays, 57 yards, 4:15. (DEN 27–20)
- DEN – 7:47 Julius Thomas 12-yard TD pass from Peyton Manning, Brandon McManus kick. Drive: 8 plays, 80 yards, 4:33. (DEN 34–20)
- DEN – 4:33 Juwan Thompson 8-yard TD run, Brandon McManus kick. Drive: 5 plays, 46 yards, 2:07. **(DEN 41–20)**

**Top passers**

- ARI – Drew Stanton: 11/26, 118 yards
- DEN – Peyton Manning: 31/47, 479 yards, 4 TD, 2 INT

**Top rushers**

- ARI – Andre Ellington: 16 rushes, 32 yards, 1 TD
- DEN – Ronnie Hillman: 15 rushes, 64 yards

**Top receivers**

- ARI – Andre Ellington: 4 receptions, 112 yards, 1 TD
- DEN – Demaryius Thomas: 8 receptions, 226 yards, 2 TD

**Top tacklers**

- ARI – Jerraud Powers: 7 tackles, 1 interception
- DEN – Danny Trevathan: 6 tackles, 1 assist

Coming off their loss to the Seahawks and subsequent bye week, the Broncos returned home for an interconference duel against the Arizona Cardinals. The Cardinals grabbed the early lead, with a 33-yard field goal by placekicker Chandler Catanzaro. The Broncos then claimed the lead, with quarterback Peyton Manning throwing his 500th career touchdown pass – a 7-yarder to tight end Julius Thomas. Another field goal by Catanzaro – from 48 yards out, narrowed the Broncos' lead to 7–6. The Broncos expanded their lead midway through the second quarter, with Manning connecting on a 31-yard touchdown pass to wide receiver Demaryius Thomas. On the Broncos' next possession, Manning was intercepted by Cardinals' defensive end Calais Campbell deep in Broncos' territory. The Cardinals' offense capitalized on the next play, with a 5-yard touchdown run by running back Andre Ellington. After the two teams traded punts, Manning threw another touchdown pass to Demaryius Thomas – an 86-yarder just after the two-minute warning. The Broncos added to their lead in the third quarter, with a 44-yard field goal by placekicker Brandon McManus. Cardinals' quarterback Drew Stanton, playing in place of an injured Carson Palmer, was knocked out of the game with a concussion by Broncos' linebacker Von Miller. Later in the third quarter, third-string quarterback Logan Thomas threw an 81-yard touchdown pass to Ellington to narrow the Broncos' lead to 24–20. However, in the fourth quarter, the Broncos pulled away from the Cardinals and scored the final 17 points of the game, with a 41-yard field goal by McManus, a 12-yard touchdown pass from Manning to Julius Thomas and an 8-yard touchdown run by running back Juwan Thompson.

Notes

The Broncos improved their all-time series record against the Cardinals to 8–1–1, and remained unbeaten in home games against the Cardinals (5–0).

==== Week 6: at New York Jets ====
Week Six: Denver Broncos at New York Jets – Game summary

Quarter	1	2	3	4	Total
**Broncos**	3	14	7	7	**31**
Jets	7	0	3	7	**17**

at MetLife Stadium, East Rutherford, New Jersey

- Date: October 12
- Game time: 1:00 p.m. EDT/11:00 am. MDT
- Game weather: 61 °F (16 °C), clear
- Game attendance: 78,160
- Referee: Brad Allen
- TV announcers (CBS): Ian Eagle, Dan Fouts and Jenny Dell
- Recap, Gamebook

Game information

**First quarter**

- DEN – 12:53 Brandon McManus 37-yard FG. Drive: 5 plays, 62 yards, 2:07. (DEN 3–0)
- NYJ – 4:16 Jace Amaro 2-yard TD pass from Geno Smith, Nick Folk kick. Drive: 7 plays, 47 yards, 3:21. (NYJ 7–3)

**Second quarter**

- DEN – 5:50 Demaryius Thomas 1-yard TD pass from Peyton Manning, Brandon McManus kick. Drive: 10 plays, 43 yards, 4:35. (DEN 10–7)
- DEN – 0:27 Julius Thomas 22-yard TD pass from Peyton Manning, Brandon McManus kick. Drive: 9 plays, 80 yards, 2:32. (DEN 17–7)

**Third quarter**

- DEN – 8:08 Julius Thomas 4 yd. pass from Peyton Manning, Brandon McManus kick. Drive: 10 plays, 87 yards, 4:54. (DEN 24–7)
- NYJ – Nick Folk 30-yard FG. Drive: 12 plays, 41 yards, 3:35. (DEN 24–10)

**Fourth quarter**

- NYJ – 7:56 Eric Decker 2-yard TD pass from Geno Smith, Nick Folk kick. Drive: 9 plays, 63 yards, 4:06. (DEN 24–17)
- DEN – 0:15 Aqib Talib 22-yard interception return for a TD, Brandon McManus kick. **(DEN 31–17)**

**Top passers**

- DEN – Peyton Manning: 22/33, 237 yards, 3 TD
- NYJ – Geno Smith: 23/43, 190 yards, 2 TD, 1 INT

**Top rushers**

- DEN – Ronnie Hillman: 24 rushes, 100 yards
- NYJ – Geno Smith: 2 rushes, 11 yards

**Top receivers**

- DEN – Demaryius Thomas, 10 receptions, 124 yards, 1 TD
- NYJ – Jace Amaro: 10 receptions, 68 yards, 1 TD

**Top tacklers**

- DEN – Brandon Marshall: 5 tackles, 1 assist
- NYJ – Demario Davis, Dawan Landry & Muhammad Wilkerson: 6 tackles each (5 assists by Davis, 7 assists by Landry & 2 assists by Wilkerson)

Coming off their win over the Cardinals, the Broncos returned to the site of Super Bowl XLVIII and flew to East Rutherford, New Jersey, for an AFC match against the New York Jets at MetLife Stadium. A 37-yard field goal by placekicker Brandon McManus gave the Broncos the lead on the game's opening possession. The Jets grabbed the lead on their second possession, with a 2-yard touchdown pass from quarterback Geno Smith to tight end Jace Amaro. The Broncos were forced to punt on their next four offensive possessions, but re-claimed the lead in the second quarter, with quarterback Peyton Manning throwing a pair of touchdown passes – a 1-yarder to wide receiver Demaryius Thomas, followed by a 22-yarder to tight end Julius Thomas just before halftime. The Broncos added to their lead on their first possession of the third quarter, with Manning connecting on another touchdown pass to Julius Thomas – from 4 yards out. However, the Jets later cut into the Broncos' lead, with a 30-yard field goal by placekicker Nick Folk, followed in the fourth quarter by a 2-yard touchdown pass from Smith to wide receiver Eric Decker, to narrow the Broncos' lead to 24–17 with eight minutes remaining in the game. Both teams went three-and-out on their next offensive possessions. The Broncos' offense got the football with 5:05 remaining in the game, and forced the Jets to burn all of their team timeouts just after the two-minute warning, but failed to convert on a critical third-down pass with 1:07 remaining in the game, forcing a punt. The Jets had one last possession deep in their own territory, however, on the third play, Smith was intercepted by Broncos' cornerback Aqib Talib, who ran 22 yards into the end zone for the game-clinching touchdown.

==== Week 7: vs. San Francisco 49ers ====
Week Seven: San Francisco 49ers at Denver Broncos – Game summary

Quarter	1	2	3	4	Total
49ers	0	10	0	7	**17**
**Broncos**	14	7	21	0	**42**

at Sports Authority Field at Mile High, Denver, Colorado

- Date: October 19
- Game time: 6:30 pm. MDT
- Game weather: 67 °F (19 °C), mostly clear
- Game attendance: 77,047
- Referee: John Parry
- TV announcers (NBC): Al Michaels, Cris Collinsworth and Michele Tafoya
- Recap, Gamebook

Game information

**First quarter**

- DEN – 8:29 Emmanuel Sanders 3-yard TD pass from Peyton Manning, Brandon McManus kick. Drive: 9 plays, 57 yards, 5:00. (DEN 7–0)
- DEN – 2:57 Wes Welker 39-yard TD pass from Peyton Manning, Brandon McManus kick. Drive: 3 plays, 59 yards, 1:22. (DEN 14–0)

**Second quarter**

- SF – 7:30 Phil Dawson 22-yard FG. Drive: 12 plays, 83 yards, 6:30. (DEN 14–3)
- DEN – 3:09 Demaryius Thomas 8-yard TD pass from Peyton Manning, Brandon McManus kick. Drive: 11 plays, 80 yards, 4:21. (DEN 21–3)
- SF – 0:11 Stevie Johnson 4-yard TD pass from Colin Kaepernick, Phil Dawson kick. Drive: 7 plays, 80 yards, 2:58. (DEN 21–10)

**Third quarter**

- DEN – 11:48 Demaryius Thomas 40-yard TD pass from Peyton Manning, Brandon McManus kick. Drive: 1 play, 40 yards, 0:07. (DEN 28–10)
- DEN – 9:24 Ronnie Hillman 37-yard TD run, Brandon McManus kick. Drive: 3 plays, 86 yards, 0:41. (DEN 35–10)
- DEN – 1:36 Ronnie Hillman 1-yard TD run, Brandon McManus kick. Drive: 12 plays, 73 yards, 7:08. (DEN 42–10)

**Fourth quarter**

- SF – 1:00 Bruce Ellington 20-yard TD pass from Blaine Gabbert, Phil Dawson kick. Drive: 9 plays, 45 yards, 1:49. **(DEN 42–17)**

**Top passers**

- SF – Colin Kaepernick: 24/39, 263 yards, 1 TD, 1 INT
- DEN – Peyton Manning: 22/26, 318 yards, 4 TD

**Top rushers**

- SF – Frank Gore: 9 rushes, 20 yards
- DEN – Ronnie Hillman: 14 rushes, 74 yards, 2 TD

**Top receivers**

- SF – Steve Johnson: 5 receptions, 79 yards, 1 TD
- DEN – Demaryius Thomas: 8 receptions, 171 yards, 2 TD

**Top tacklers**

- SF – Chris Borland and Michael Wilhoite: 7 tackles each (1 assist and 1 sack by Borland)
- DEN – Brandon Marshall: 8 tackles

Coming off their win over the Jets, the Broncos returned home for an interconference duel against the San Francisco 49ers. The Broncos jumped out to a 14–0 lead in the first quarter, with quarterback Peyton Manning throwing a pair of touchdown passes – a 3-yarder to wide receiver Emmanuel Sanders and a 39-yarder to wide receiver Wes Welker. The 49ers got on the scoreboard midway through the second quarter, with a 22-yard field goal by placekicker Phil Dawson. On the Broncos' next possession, Manning became the NFL's all-time leader in career touchdown passes, with an 8-yard touchdown pass to wide receiver Demaryius Thomas. The 49ers responded just before halftime, with a 4-yard touchdown pass from quarterback Colin Kaepernick to wide receiver Stevie Johnson, which narrowed the Broncos' lead to 21–10. On the 49ers' first offensive possession of the second half, Kaepernick was intercepted by Broncos' cornerback Aqib Talib. The Broncos subsequently took control of the game with 21 unanswered points, consisting of a 40-yard touchdown pass from Manning to Demaryius Thomas, followed by a pair of rushing touchdown by running back Ronnie Hillman – a 37-yarder and a 1-yarder. With the Broncos comfortably ahead, Manning sat out the entire fourth quarter, and backup quarterback Brock Osweiler took his place. The 49ers added a late score, with quarterback Blaine Gabbert, playing in place of Kaepernick, throwing a 20-yard touchdown pass to wide receiver Bruce Ellington.

Notes

This was the only game during the 2014 season in which the Broncos wore their alternate navy blue uniforms.

==== Week 8: vs. San Diego Chargers ====
Week Eight: San Diego Chargers at Denver Broncos – Game summary

Quarter	1	2	3	4	Total
Chargers	0	7	7	7	**21**
**Broncos**	0	14	14	7	**35**

at Sports Authority Field at Mile High, Denver, Colorado

- Date: October 23
- Game time: 6:20 pm. MDT
- Game weather: 68 °F (20 °C), partly cloudy
- Game attendance: 76,907
- Referee: Terry McAulay
- TV announcers (CBS/NFLN): Jim Nantz, Phil Simms and Tracy Wolfson
- Recap, Gamebook

Game information

**First quarter**

- No scoring plays

**Second quarter**

- DEN – 13:35 Emmanuel Sanders 2-yard TD pass from Peyton Manning, Brandon McManus kick. Drive: 7 plays, 69 yards, 3:18. (DEN 7–0)
- SD – 3:07 Keenan Allen 2-yard TD pass from Philip Rivers, Nick Novak kick. Drive: 13 plays, 84 yards, 7:31. (tied 7–7)
- DEN – 0:32 Emmanuel Sanders 31-yard TD pass from Peyton Manning, Brandon McManus kick. Drive: 8 plays, 74 yards, 2:35. (DEN 14–7)

**Third quarter**

- DEN – 10:53 Emmanuel Sanders 3-yard TD pass from Peyton Manning, Brandon McManus kick. Drive: 6 plays, 51 yards, 2:42. (DEN 21–7)
- DEN – 7:34 Juwan Thompson 2-yard TD run, Brandon McManus kick. Drive: 5 plays, 61 yards, 1:41. (DEN 28–7)
- SD – 2:39 Antonio Gates 4-yard TD pass from Philip Rivers, Nick Novak kick. Drive: 12 plays, 80 yards, 4:55. (DEN 28–14)

**Fourth quarter**

- DEN – 13:29 Juwan Thompson 1-yard TD run, Brandon McManus kick. Drive: 8 plays, 65 yards, 4:10. (DEN 35–14)
- SD – Antonio Gates 10-yard TD pass from Philip Rivers, Nick Novak kick. Drive: 8 plays, 80 yards, 3:58. **(DEN 35–21)**

**Top passers**

- SD – Philip Rivers: 30/41, 252 yards, 3 TD, 2 INT
- DEN – Peyton Manning: 25/35, 286 yards, 3 TD

**Top rushers**

- SD – Branden Oliver: 13 rushes, 36 yards
- DEN – Ronnie Hillman: 20 rushes, 109 yards

**Top receivers**

- SD – Keenan Allen: 9 receptions, 73 yards, 1 TD
- DEN – Emmanuel Sanders: 9 receptions, 120 yards, 3 TD

**Top tacklers**

- SD – Eric Weddle: 9 tackles, 2 assists, 1 forced fumble
- DEN – Brandon Marshall: 8 tackles, 2 assists

Coming off their dominant win over the 49ers, the Broncos remained on home ground for an AFC West duel against the San Diego Chargers on Thursday Night Football. After a scoreless first quarter, a 2-yard touchdown pass from quarterback Peyton Manning to wide receiver Emmanuel Sanders gave the Broncos the lead early in the second quarter. After the two teams traded punts on their next possessions, the Chargers tied the game with a time-consuming drive, culminating with 2-yard touchdown pass from quarterback Philip Rivers to wide receiver Keenan Allen. On the ensuing kickoff, Chargers' linebacker Kavell Conner forced a fumble off Broncos' return specialist Andre Caldwell, and it was recovered by Chargers' tight end Ladarius Green deep in Broncos' territory. However, it was overturned after an instant replay review. The Broncos then re-claimed the lead just before halftime, with another touchdown pass from Manning to Sanders – from 31 yards out.

On the Chargers' opening possession of the second half, Rivers was intercepted by Broncos' cornerback Chris Harris, Jr., and six plays later, the Broncos added to their lead, with Manning throwing his third touchdown pass to Sanders – from 3 yards out. After the Broncos' defense forced a Chargers' punt, the Broncos increased their lead to 28–7 midway through the third quarter, with running back Juwan Thompson rushing for a 2-yard touchdown. The Chargers responded on their next possession, with a 4-yard touchdown pass from Rivers to tight end Antonio Gates on 4th-and-goal. The Broncos countered early in the fourth quarter, with Thompson rushing for a 1-yard touchdown. The drive was kept alive by a defensive holding penalty on Chargers' safety Marcus Gilchrist that negated an Eric Weddle interception of Manning near the goal line. The Chargers once again had a response, with another touchdown pass from Rivers to Gates – from 10 yards out. The Broncos tried to add to their lead on their next possession, however, placekicker Brandon McManus missed on a 53-yard field goal attempt. The Chargers attempted a rally, but Rivers was intercepted by Broncos' safety Rahim Moore near the goal line with five minutes remaining in the game. The Broncos' offense then ran out most of the clock, aided by a crucial 5-yard pass completion from Manning to wide receiver Wes Welker on 3rd-and-4 from their own 10-yard line that forced the Chargers to burn the last two of their three team timeouts, sealing the win for the Broncos.

==== Week 9: at New England Patriots ====
Week Nine: Denver Broncos at New England Patriots – Game summary

Quarter	1	2	3	4	Total
Broncos	7	0	14	0	**21**
**Patriots**	3	24	10	6	**43**

at Gillette Stadium, Foxborough, Massachusetts

- Date: November 2
- Game time: 4:25 pm. EST/2:25 pm. MST
- Game weather: 35 °F (2 °C), cloudy
- Game attendance: 68,756
- Referee: Walt Anderson
- TV announcers (CBS): Jim Nantz, Phil Simms and Tracy Wolfson
- Recap, Gamebook

Game information

**First quarter**

- NE – 7:09 Stephen Gostkowski 49-yard FG. Drive: 4 plays, 8 yards, 1:50. (NE 3–0)
- DEN – 3:54 Ronnie Hillman 1-yard TD run, Brandon McManus kick. Drive: 9 plays, 80 yards, 3:15. (DEN 7–3)

**Second quarter**

- NE – 14:19 Stephen Gostkowski 29-yard FG. Drive: 12 plays, 67 yards, 4:35. (DEN 7–6)
- NE – 11:41 Julian Edelman 5-yard TD pass from Tom Brady, Stephen Gostkowski kick. Drive: 4 plays, 34 yards, 1:53. (NE 13–7)
- NE – 8:11 Julian Edelman 84-yard punt return for a TD, Stephen Gostkowski kick. (NE 20–7)
- NE – 0:08 Shane Vereen 5-yard TD pass from Tom Brady, Stephen Gostkowski kick. Drive: 9 plays, 57 yards, 1:57. (NE 27–7)

**Third quarter**

- DEN – 11:06 Julius Thomas 18-yard TD pass from Peyton Manning, Brandon McManus kick. Drive: 6 plays, 57 yards, 2:24. (NE 27–14)
- NE – 7:46 Stephen Gostkowski 45-yard FG. Drive: 12 plays, 53 yards, 3:20. (NE 30–14)
- NE – 7:27 Brandon LaFell 10-yard TD pass from Tom Brady, Stephen Gostkowski kick. Drive: 1 play, 10 yards, 0:04. (NE 37–14)
- DEN – 5:50 Ronnie Hillman 15-yard TD pass from Peyton Manning, Brandon McManus kick. Drive: 4 plays, 72 yards, 1:37. (NE 37–21)

**Fourth quarter**

- NE – 13:57 Rob Gronkowski 1-yard TD pass from Tom Brady, 2-point pass failed. Drive: 14 plays, 80 yards, 6:53. **(NE 43–21)**

**Top passers**

- DEN – Peyton Manning: 34/57, 438 yards, 2 TD, 2 INT
- NE – Tom Brady: 33/53, 333 yards, 4 TD, 1 INT

**Top rushers**

- DEN – C. J. Anderson: 3 rushes, 18 yards
- NE – Jonas Gray: 12 rushes, 33 yards

**Top receivers**

- DEN – Emmanuel Sanders: 10 receptions, 151 yards
- NE – Rob Gronkowski: 9 receptions, 105 yards, 1 TD

**Top tacklers**

- DEN – Rahim Moore and T. J. Ward: 8 tackles each
- NE – Jamie Collins: 10 tackles, 1 assist

Coming off their win over the Chargers, the Broncos traveled to Foxborough, Massachusetts to face the New England Patriots at Gillette Stadium. The Patriots got on the scoreboard first, with a 49-yard field goal by placekicker Stephen Gostkowski. The Broncos grabbed the lead later in the first quarter, with running back Ronnie Hillman rushing for a 1-yard touchdown. However, the Patriots then reeled off 24 unanswered points. First came a 29-yard field goal by Gostkowski early in the second quarter. Then, on the second play of the Broncos' next possession, Patriots' defensive end Rob Ninkovich intercepted Broncos' quarterback Peyton Manning, and the Patriots capitalized five plays later, with a 5-yard touchdown pass from quarterback Tom Brady to wide receiver Julian Edelman. This was followed by Edelman returning a punt 84 yards for a touchdown and a 5-yard touchdown pass from Brady to running back Shane Vereen just before halftime. On the Patriots' first possession of the second half, Brady was intercepted by Broncos' cornerback Bradley Roby, and six plays later, Manning connected on an 18-yard touchdown pass to tight end Julius Thomas to narrow the gap to 27–14. However, the Patriots added to their lead, with a 45-yard field goal by Gostkowski, followed by a 10-yard touchdown pass from Brady to wide receiver Brandon LaFell. The latter score came after a Manning pass intended for wide receiver Wes Welker bounced off Welker and was intercepted by cornerback Brandon Browner. The Broncos attempted a rally, with Manning connecting on a 15-yard touchdown pass to Hillman. However, the Patriots put the game out of reach early in the fourth quarter, with a 1-yard touchdown pass from Brady to tight end Rob Gronkowski. The Broncos' offense drove deep into Patriots' territory on two of their next three possessions, but turned the football over on downs each time.

Notes

Tom Brady improved his head-to-head record against Peyton Manning to 11–5. This was the final regular season meeting between the two legendary quarterbacks; a foot injury kept Manning out of the teams' 2015 meeting, and the two quarterbacks met for the final time in the 2015 AFC Championship.

==== Week 10: at Oakland Raiders ====
Week Ten: Denver Broncos at Oakland Raiders – Game summary

Quarter	1	2	3	4	Total
**Broncos**	3	17	21	0	**41**
Raiders	3	7	0	7	**17**

at O.co Coliseum, Oakland, California

- Date: November 9
- Game time: 2:05 pm. MST/1:05 pm. PST
- Game weather: 68 °F (20 °C), clear
- Game attendance: 54,803
- Referee: Carl Cheffers
- TV announcers (CBS): Greg Gumbel, Trent Green and Evan Washburn
- Recap, Gamebook

Game information

**First quarter**

- OAK – 9:35 Sebastian Janikowski 41-yard FG. Drive: 9 plays, 26 yards, 4:45. (OAK 3–0)
- DEN – 4:06 Brandon McManus 20-yard FG. Drive: 12 plays, 73 yards, 5:29. (tied 3–3)

**Second quarter**

- DEN – 14:22 Brandon McManus 28-yard FG. Drive: 9 plays, 55 yards, 3:04. (DEN 6–3)
- OAK – 11:19 Brice Butler 5-yard TD pass from Derek Carr, Sebastian Janikowski kick. Drive: 3 plays, 12 yards, 1:20. (OAK 10–6)
- DEN – 2:44 C. J. Anderson 51-yard TD pass from Peyton Manning, Brandon McManus kick. Drive: 3 plays, 53 yards, 0:46. (DEN 13–10)
- DEN – 0:28 Emmanuel Sanders 32-yard TD pass from Peyton Manning, Brandon McManus kick. Drive: 4 plays, 62 yards, 1:12. (DEN 20–10)

**Third quarter**

- DEN – 12:43 Julius Thomas 10-yard TD pass from Peyton Manning, Brandon McManus kick. Drive: 3 plays, 18 yards, 1:28. (DEN 27–10)
- DEN – 6:52 Julius Thomas 32-yard TD pass from Peyton Manning, Brandon McManus kick. Drive: 8 plays, 81 yards, 4:21. (DEN 34–10)
- DEN – 1:01 Emmanuel Sanders 15-yard TD pass from Peyton Manning, Brandon McManus kick. Drive: 6 plays, 34 yards, 2:49. (DEN 41–10)

**Fourth quarter**

- OAK – 0:48 Mychal Rivera 18-yard TD pass from Derek Carr, Sebastian Janikowski kick. Drive: 8 plays, 97 yards, 3:42. **(DEN 41–17)**

**Top passers**

- DEN – Peyton Manning: 31/44, 340 yards, 5 TD, 2 INT
- OAK – Derek Carr: 30/47, 192 yards, 2 TD, 2 INT

**Top rushers**

- DEN – C. J. Anderson: 13 rushes, 90 yards, 1 receiving TD
- OAK – Darren McFadden: 7 rushes, 14 yards

**Top receivers**

- DEN – Demaryius Thomas: 11 receptions, 108 yards
- OAK – Mychal Rivera: 6 receptions, 64 yards, 1 TD

**Top tacklers**

- DEN – Brandon Marshall: 11 tackles, 2 assists
- OAK – Larry Asante and Tarell Brown: 8 tackles each (2 assists by Asante)

Hoping to rebound from their loss to the Patriots, the Broncos flew to the O.co Coliseum for an AFC West duel with the Oakland Raiders. Each team traded field goals in the first quarter, with a 41-yard field goal by Raiders' placekicker Sebastian Janikowski and a 20-yarder by Broncos' placekicker Brandon McManus, the latter of whom added a 28-yard field goal early in the second quarter. The Raiders re-claimed the lead, with quarterback Derek Carr connecting on a 5-yard touchdown pass to wide receiver Brice Butler. However, the Broncos took control of the game with 35 unanswered points. Quarterback Peyton Manning shook off two early interceptions and connected on a pair of touchdown passes within the last three minutes of the first half – 51-yarder to running back C. J. Anderson and a 32-yarder to wide receiver Emmanuel Sanders. Manning added three more touchdown passes in the third quarter – a 10- and 12-yarder to tight end Julius Thomas, followed by a 15-yarder to Sanders. Two of the three third-quarter scoring plays came off Raiders' turnovers. Manning sat out the entire fourth quarter, and backup quarterback Brock Osweiler took his place. The Raiders added a late score, with Carr connecting on an 18-yard touchdown pass to tight end Mychal Rivera.

==== Week 11: at St. Louis Rams ====
Week Eleven: Denver Broncos at St. Louis Rams – Game summary

Quarter	1	2	3	4	Total
Broncos	0	7	0	0	**7**
**Rams**	10	3	3	6	**22**

at Edward Jones Dome, St. Louis, Missouri

- Date: November 16
- Game time: 12:00 p.m. CST/11:00 am. MST
- Game weather: Played indoors (dome stadium)
- Game attendance: 59,401
- Referee: Tony Corrente
- TV announcers (CBS): Ian Eagle, Dan Fouts and Jenny Dell
- Recap, Gamebook

Game information

**First quarter**

- STL – 9:14 Greg Zuerlein 37-yard FG. Drive: 11 plays, 61 yards, 5:46. (STL 3–0)
- STL – 1:10 Kenny Britt 63-yard TD pass from Shaun Hill, Greg Zuerlein kick. Drive: 1 play, 63 yards, 0:08. (STL 10–0)

**Second quarter**

- STL – 3:57 Greg Zuerlein 29-yard FG. Drive: 11 plays, 69 yards, 6:55. (STL 13–0)
- DEN – 2:22 Emmanuel Sanders 42-yard TD pass from Peyton Manning, Brandon McManus kick. Drive: 5 plays, 80 yards, 1:35. (STL 13–7)

**Third quarter**

- STL – 1:41 Greg Zuerlein 22-yard FG. Drive: 8 plays, 48 yards, 4:07. (STL 16–7)

**Fourth quarter**

- STL – 11:59 Greg Zuerlein 55-yard FG. Drive: 7 plays, 16 yards, 2:56. (STL 19–7)
- STL – 4:44 Greg Zuerlein 53-yard FG. Drive: 4 plays, 6 yards, 0:39. **(STL 22–7)**

**Top passers**

- DEN – Peyton Manning: 34/54, 389 yards, 1 TD, 2 INT
- STL – Shaun Hill: 20/29, 220 yards, 1 TD

**Top rushers**

- DEN – C. J. Anderson: 9 rushes, 29 yards
- STL – Tre Mason: 29 rushes, 113 yards

**Top receivers**

- DEN – Demaryius Thomas: 7 receptions, 103 yards
- STL – Kenny Britt: 4 receptions, 128 yards, 1 TD

**Top tacklers**

- DEN – Brandon Marshall: 13 tackles, 2 assists
- STL – Alec Ogletree: 10 tackles, 3 assists, 1 INT

Coming off their win over the Raiders, the Broncos traveled to the Edward Jones Dome for an interconference match against the St. Louis Rams. The Rams grabbed the early lead on their first possession, with a 29-yard field goal by placekicker Greg Zuerlein. The Broncos were forced to punt on their first offensive possession. On the Broncos' next possession, tight end Julius Thomas suffered an ankle injury and did not return to the game. On the tenth play of the drive, the Broncos opted to go for a first-down on a 4th-and-5 from the Rams' 37-yard line rather than attempt a long field goal, however, a pass from quarterback Peyton Manning to wide receiver Emmanuel Sanders fell incomplete. On the very next play, the Rams extended to a 10–0 lead, with quarterback Shaun Hill connecting on a 63-yard touchdown pass to wide receiver Kenny Britt, with Britt evading a tackle by Broncos' cornerback Bradley Roby. The Rams' defense held the Broncos' offense in check on their next two possessions, and with four minutes remaining in the second quarter, Zuerlein added a 29-yard field goal to give the Rams a 13–0 lead. The Broncos subsequently got on the scoreboard on their next possession, with a 42-yard touchdown pass from Manning to Sanders just before the two-minute warning.

On the fourth play of the Broncos' first possession of the second half, Sanders suffered a concussion after absorbing a helmet-to-helmet hit from Rams' safety Rodney McLeod, and did not return. However, after the 15-yard penalty, the Broncos could not advance the football from the Rams' 38-yard line, and were forced to punt. The Rams increased their lead to 16–7 later in their third quarter, with a 22-yard field goal by Zuerlein. On the Broncos' next possession, Manning was intercepted by Rams' linebacker Alec Ogletree, and seven plays later, a 55-yard field goal by Zuerlein increased the Rams' lead to 19–7 early in the fourth quarter. The Broncos advanced to as far as the Rams' 28-yard line on their next possession, and faced a 4th-and-4, however, Manning was sacked by Rams' defensive tackle Aaron Donald. The Broncos' defense subsequently forced a Rams' punt, however, Manning was intercepted by cornerback Trumaine Johnson on the Broncos' next possession. Four plays later, Zuerlein added a 53-yard field goal with 4:48 remaining in the game. With no timeouts remaining, the Broncos attempted a rally, but the Rams' defense stood their ground, and subsequently ran out most of the clock on offense.

Notes

The Broncos accumulated only 28 rushing yards. The Rams' defense held the Broncos to 4-of-12 on third down and 0-of-3 on fourth down. This was the Broncos' lowest point total since Peyton Manning became the teams' starting quarterback in 2012. With his 389-yard performance, Manning now has at least one 300-yard passing game against every NFL team. However, his streak of 15 consecutive games with multiple touchdown passes came to an end. This was the Broncos' final game against the St. Louis Rams—home or away—prior to the Rams' relocation to Los Angeles in 2016.

==== Week 12: vs. Miami Dolphins ====
Week Twelve: Miami Dolphins at Denver Broncos – Game summary

Quarter	1	2	3	4	Total
Dolphins	7	14	7	8	**36**
**Broncos**	3	14	0	22	**39**

at Sports Authority Field at Mile High, Denver, Colorado

- Date: November 23
- Game time: 2:25 pm. MST
- Game weather: 39 °F (4 °C), mostly cloudy
- Game attendance: 76,987
- Referee: Jeff Triplette
- TV announcers (CBS): Jim Nantz, Phil Simms and Tracy Wolfson
- Recap, Gamebook

Game information

**First quarter**

- MIA – 11:22 Daniel Thomas 3-yard TD run, Caleb Sturgis kick. Drive: 7 plays, 80 yards, 3:38. (MIA 7–0)
- DEN – 4:10 Brandon McManus 38-yard FG. Drive: 12 plays, 53 yards, 7:12. (MIA 7–3)

**Second quarter**

- MIA – 12:53 Ryan Tannehill 1-yard TD run, Caleb Sturgis kick. Drive: 8 plays, 47 yards, 3:47. (MIA 14–3)
- DEN – 7:08 Demaryius Thomas 5-yard TD pass from Peyton Manning, Brandon McManus kick. Drive: 11 plays, 77 yards, 5:45. (MIA 14–10)
- MIA – 1:54 Mike Wallace 10-yard TD pass from Ryan Tannehill, Caleb Sturgis kick. Drive: 10 plays, 87 yards, 5:14. (MIA 21–10)
- DEN – 0:12 Demaryius Thomas 14-yard TD pass from Peyton Manning, Brandon McManus kick. Drive: 8 plays, 80 yards, 1:42. (MIA 21–17)

**Third quarter**

- MIA – 2:11 Jarvis Landry 5-yard TD pass from Ryan Tannehill, Caleb Sturgis kick. Drive: 4 plays, 12 yards, 1:09. (MIA 28–17)

**Fourth quarter**

- DEN – 14:09 Demaryius Thomas 5-yard TD pass from Peyton Manning, Peyton Manning pass to Emmanuel Sanders for a two-point conversion. Drive: 9 plays, 60 yards, 3:02. (MIA 28–25)
- DEN – 5:01 C. J. Anderson 10-yard TD run, Brandon McManus kick. Drive: 11 plays, 70 yards, 6:16. (DEN 32–28)
- DEN – 3:13 Wes Welker 2-yard TD pass from Peyton Manning, Brandon McManus kick. Drive: 2 plays, 8 yards, 0:17. (DEN 39–28)
- MIA – 1:34 Jarvis Landry 1-yard TD pass from Ryan Tannehill, Lamar Miller run for a two-point conversion. Drive: 9 plays, 84 yards, 1:39. **(DEN 39–36)**

**Top passers**

- MIA – Ryan Tannehill: 26/36, 228 yards, 3 TD (1 rushing), 1 INT
- DEN – Peyton Manning: 28/35, 257 yards, 4 TD

**Top rushers**

- MIA – Lamar Miller: 12 rushes, 59 yards
- DEN – C. J. Anderson: 27 rushes, 167 yards, 1 TD

**Top receivers**

- MIA – Jarvis Landry: 7 rushes, 50 yards, 2 TD
- DEN – Emmanuel Sanders: 9 receptions, 125 yards

**Top tacklers**

- MIA – Jelani Jenkins: 9 tackles, 2 assists, 1 sack
- DEN – Chris Harris, Jr. and Rahim Moore: 5 tackles each (1 forced fumble by Harris, 1 assist by Moore)

Hoping to rebound from their loss to the Rams, the Broncos returned home for an AFC duel against the Miami Dolphins – the Broncos' first home game in exactly one month. The Dolphins grabbed the early lead, with running back Daniel Thomas rushing for a 3-yard touchdown. The Broncos subsequently got on the scoreboard, with a 38-yard field goal by placekicker Brandon McManus. The Dolphins added to their lead early in the second quarter, with quarterback Ryan Tannehill rushing for a 1-yard touchdown. The Broncos cut into the Dolphins' lead, with quarterback Peyton Manning connecting on a 5-yard touchdown pass to wide receiver Demaryius Thomas, however, the Dolphins responded, with Tannehill throwing a 10-yard touchdown pass to wide receiver Mike Wallace. Another touchdown pass from Manning to Demaryius Thomas – from 14 yards out – narrowed the Dolphins' lead to 21–17 just before halftime.

The Broncos drove to as far as the Dolphins' 7-yard line on the initial possession of the second half, but after Manning was sacked by Dolphins' linebacker Jelani Jenkins for an 8-yard loss, McManus missed on a 33-yard field goal attempt. After the Broncos' defense forced a Dolphins' punt, return specialist Isaiah Burse fumbled deep in Broncos' territory, giving the football back to the Dolphins. Four plays later, Tannehill connected with wide receiver Jarvis Landry on a 5-yard touchdown pass to give the Dolphins a 28–17 lead at the 2:15 mark of the third quarter. The Broncos then reeled off 22 unanswered points. Early in the fourth quarter, Manning threw his third touchdown pass of the game to Demaryius Thomas – from 5 yards out – coupled with a two-point conversion pass to wide receiver Emmanuel Sanders. After forcing a Dolphins' punt, the Broncos grabbed their first lead of the game at the 5:05 mark of the fourth quarter, with running back C. J. Anderson rushing for a 10-yard touchdown. On the third play of the Dolphins' next possession, Tannehill was intercepted by Broncos' safety T. J. Ward, who advanced the football all the way to the Dolphins' 8-yard line. Two plays later, Manning threw a 2-yard touchdown pass to wide receiver Wes Welker to increase the Broncos' lead to 39–28 with 3:17 remaining in the fourth quarter. The Dolphins attempted a rally, with Tannehill connecting on a 1-yard touchdown pass to Landry, coupled with running back Lamar Miller rushing for a two-point conversion, with 1:37 remaining in the game. However, the Dolphins' onside kick attempt was unsuccessful, and the Broncos subsequently ran out the clock.

Notes

Demaryius Thomas' streak of 100-yard receiving games ended at seven games, one shy of the NFL record that was set by Detroit Lions' wide receiver Calvin Johnson in 2012.

==== Week 13: at Kansas City Chiefs ====
Week Thirteen: Denver Broncos at Kansas City Chiefs – Game summary

Quarter	1	2	3	4	Total
**Broncos**	14	6	3	6	**29**
Chiefs	0	7	3	6	**16**

at Arrowhead Stadium, Kansas City, Missouri

- Date: November 30
- Game time: 7:30 pm. CST/6:30 pm. MST
- Game weather: 27 °F (−3 °C), cloudy
- Game attendance: 76,894
- Referee: Walt Coleman
- TV announcers (NBC): Al Michaels, Cris Collinsworth and Michele Tafoya
- Recap, Gamebook

Game information

**First quarter**

- DEN – Demaryius Thomas 23-yard pass from Peyton Manning (Connor Barth kick), 9:02. Broncos 7–0. **Drive: 8 plays, 74 yards, 4:54.**
- DEN – C. J. Anderson 15-yard pass from Peyton Manning (Connor Barth kick), 2:04. Broncos 14–0. **Drive: 10 plays, 48 yards, 4:46.**

**Second quarter**

- DEN – Connor Barth 22-yard field goal, 7:18. Broncos 17–0. **Drive: 15 plays, 63 yards, 7:58.**
- KC – Anthony Fasano 20-yard pass from Alex Smith (Cairo Santos kick), 3:08. Broncos 17–7. **Drive: 7 plays, 69 yards, 4:12.**
- DEN – Connor Barth 24-yard field goal, 0:19. Broncos 20–7. **Drive: 10 plays, 53 yards, 2:46.**

**Third quarter**

- KC – Cairo Santos 39-yard field goal, 12:48. Broncos 20–10. **Drive: 4 plays, 2 yards, 1:17.**
- DEN – Connor Barth 30-yard field goal, 6:20. Broncos 23–10. **Drive: 4 plays, 2 yards, 0:58.**

**Fourth quarter**

- DEN – Connor Barth 33-yard field goal, 14:47. Broncos 26–10. **Drive: 7 plays, 23 yards, 3:06.**
- KC – Jamaal Charles 12-yard pass from Alex Smith (pass failed), 11:54. Broncos 26–16. **Drive: 7 plays, 62 yards, 2:58.**
- DEN – Connor Barth 37-yard field goal, 7:37. Broncos 29–16. **Drive: 9 plays, 65 yards, 4:13.**

**Top passers**

- DEN – Peyton Manning – 17/34, 179 yards, 2 TD
- KC – Alex Smith – 15/23, 153 yards, 2 TD, INT

**Top rushers**

- DEN – C. J. Anderson – 32 rushes, 168 yards
- KC – Jamaal Charles – 10 rushes, 35 yards

**Top receivers**

- DEN – Emmanuel Sanders – 6 receptions, 73 yards
- KC – Travis Kelce – 3 receptions, 36 yards

**Top tacklers**

- DEN – T. J. Ward – 6 tackles (1 sack)
- KC – Justin Houston – 7 tackles, 1 assist (1 sack), 2 passes defended, 1 forced fumble

Coming off their come-from-behind win over the Dolphins, the Broncos traveled to Arrowhead Stadium for an AFC West rematch with the Kansas City Chiefs. The Broncos jumped out to a 14–0 lead on their first two possessions in the first quarter, with quarterback Peyton Manning throwing a pair of touchdown passes – a 23-yarder to wide receiver Demaryius Thomas and a 15-yarder to running back C. J. Anderson. A 22-yard field goal by placekicker Connor Barth increased the Broncos' lead to 17–0 early in the second quarter. The scoring play occurred after the Broncos' special teams fooled the Chiefs with a fake punt run by safety David Bruton and a fourth-down conversion by Anderson. The Chiefs got on the scoreboard later in the second quarter, with quarterback Alex Smith connecting on a 20-yard touchdown pass to tight end Anthony Fasano. The Broncos' offense subsequently marched down the field, but had to settle on a 24-yard field goal by Barth just before halftime. The Chiefs' defense forced a fumble off Manning deep in Broncos' territory on the Broncos' first possession of the second half, but had to settle on a 39-yard field goal by placekicker Cairo Santos. Barth added two more field goals – a 30-yarder midway through the third quarter and a 33-yarder early in the fourth quarter – to increase the Broncos' lead to 26–10. The first field goal came after a DeMarcus Ware interception of Smith on a deflected pass, while the second field goal came after Chiefs' cornerback Marcus Cooper muffed a punt. The Chiefs narrowed the Broncos' lead, with Smith throwing a 12-yard touchdown pass to running back Jamaal Charles. However, Broncos' safety T. J. Ward knocked away a two-point conversion pass from Smith intended for Fasano that would have brought the Chiefs to within a one-score deficit. Barth added one more field goal – a 37-yarder midway through the fourth quarter. The Broncos' defense subdued the Chiefs for the remainder of the game.

Notes

With the win, the Broncos swept the Chiefs for a third consecutive season. Peyton Manning improved his personal record to 11–1 all-time in games against the Chiefs. The Broncos were the last AFC West divisional rival to sweep the Chiefs until the 2025 Chargers.

==== Week 14: vs. Buffalo Bills ====
Week Fourteen: Buffalo Bills at Denver Broncos – Game summary

Quarter	1	2	3	4	Total
Bills	0	3	0	14	**17**
**Broncos**	7	7	10	0	**24**

at Sports Authority Field at Mile High, Denver, Colorado

- Date: December 7
- Game time: 2:05 pm. MST
- Game weather: 63 °F (17 °C), mostly sunny
- Game attendance: 76,913
- Referee: Ron Torbert
- TV announcers (CBS): Kevin Harlan and Rich Gannon
- Recap, Gamebook

Game information

**First quarter**

- DEN – 2:43 C. J. Anderson 6-yard TD run, Connor Barth kick. Drive: 5 plays, 61 yards, 2:52. (DEN 7–0)

**Second quarter**

- BUF – 11:51 Dan Carpenter 44-yard FG. Drive: 12 plays, 55 yards, 5:52. (DEN 7–3)
- DEN – C. J. Anderson 1-yard TD run, Connor Barth kick. Drive: 10 plays, 60 yards, 5:27. (DEN 14–3)

**Third quarter**

- DEN – 12:01 C. J. Anderson 3-yard TD run, Connor Barth kick. Drive: 5 plays, 80 yards, 2:59. (DEN 21–3)
- DEN – 1:07 Connor Barth 50-yard FG. Drive: 8 plays, 28 yards, 3:49. (DEN 24–3)

**Fourth quarter**

- BUF – 10:46 Chris Hogan 14-yard TD pass from Kyle Orton, Dan Carpenter kick. Drive: 13 plays, 80 yards, 5:21. (DEN 24–10)
- BUF – 0:55 Kyle Orton 1-yard TD run, Dan Carpenter kick. Drive: 17 plays, 90 yards, 3:25. **(DEN 24–17)**

**Top passers**

- BUF – Kyle Orton: 38/57, 355 yards, 1 TD (1 rushing), 2 INT
- DEN – Peyton Manning: 14/20, 173 yards, 2 INT

**Top rushers**

- BUF – Fred Jackson: 8 rushes, 35 yards
- DEN – Juwan Thompson: 4 rushes, 63 yards

**Top receivers**

- BUF – Sammy Watkins: 7 receptions, 127 yards
- DEN – Wes Welker: 6 receptions, 82 yards

**Top tacklers**

- BUF – Corey Graham: 4 tackles, 1 assist, 1 interception, 1 fumble recovery
- DEN – David Bruton, Brandon Marshall and Bradley Roby: 9 tackles each (1 interception by Marshall, 1 forced fumble by Bruton and Roby)

Coming off their win over the Chiefs, the Broncos returned home for an AFC match against the Buffalo Bills. A 6-yard touchdown run by Broncos' running back C. J. Anderson was the only scoring play of the first quarter. The Bills got on the scoreboard early in the second quarter, with a 44-yard field goal by placekicker Dan Carpenter. The Broncos later added to their lead, with Anderson rushing for two more touchdowns – a 1-yarder later in the second quarter, followed by a 3-yarder on the initial possession of the second half. On the Bills' first possession of the third quarter, quarterback Kyle Orton was intercepted by Broncos' linebacker Brandon Marshall at the Bills' 33-yard line. However, three plays later, Broncos' quarterback Peyton Manning was intercepted by Bills' cornerback Stephon Gilmore. The Bills subsequently marched to the Broncos' 19-yard line in eight plays, however, Orton was intercepted by Broncos' cornerback Chris Harris, Jr. near the goal line. Eight plays later, the Broncos extended their lead to 24–3 late in the third quarter, with a 50-yard field goal by placekicker Connor Barth. The Bills then narrowed the Broncos' lead, with a 13-play, 80-yard drive, culminating in a 14-yard touchdown pass from Orton to wide receiver Chris Hogan at the 10:52 mark of the fourth quarter. The Bills' defense forced the Broncos to punt on their next two possessions. Trailing 24–10 with 4:20 remaining in the game and no timeouts, the Bills attempted a rally, with Orton rushing for a 1-yard touchdown with 55 seconds remaining. However, the Bills' onside kick attempt was unsuccessful, and the Broncos subsequently ran out the clock.

Notes

Peyton Manning's streak of 51 consecutive games with at least one touchdown pass came to an end. Manning's streak is the third-longest in NFL history, behind Tom Brady (52) and Drew Brees (54).

==== Week 15: at San Diego Chargers ====
Week Fifteen: Denver Broncos at San Diego Chargers – Game summary

Quarter	1	2	3	4	Total
**Broncos**	3	6	7	6	**22**
Chargers	0	3	0	7	**10**

at Qualcomm Stadium, San Diego, California

- Date: December 14
- Game time: 2:05 pm. MST/1:05 pm. PST
- Game weather: 64 °F (18 °C), sunny
- Game attendance: 68,682
- Referee: Craig Wrolstad
- TV announcers (CBS): Jim Nantz, Phil Simms and Tracy Wolfson
- Recap, Gamebook

Game information

**First quarter**

- DEN – 6:55 Connor Barth 19-yard FG. Drive: 9 plays, 68 yards, 3:51. (DEN 3–0)

**Second quarter**

- DEN – 14:21 Connor Barth 26-yard FG. Drive: 12 plays, 61 yards, 6:06. (DEN 6–0)
- DEN – 1:50 Connor Barth 19-yard FG. Drive: 11 plays, 63 yards, 5:08. (DEN 9–0)
- SD – 0:10 Nick Novak 30-yard FG. Drive: 4 plays, 5 yards, 0:40. (DEN 9–3)

**Third quarter**

- DEN – 0:31 Demaryius Thomas 28-yard TD pass from Peyton Manning, Connor Barth kick. Drive: 7 plays, 73 yards, 4:01. (DEN 16–3)

**Fourth quarter**

- SD – 10:13 Antonio Gates 5-yard TD pass from Philip Rivers, Nick Novak kick. Drive: 11 plays, 80 yards, 5:18. (DEN 16–10)
- DEN – 4:53 Connor Barth 49-yard FG. Drive: 10 plays, 57 yards, 5:20. (DEN 19–10)
- DEN – 3:56 Connor Barth 44-yard FG. Drive: 4 plays, 8 yards, 0:20. **(DEN 22–10)**

**Top passers**

- DEN – Peyton Manning: 14/20, 233 yards, 1 TD
- SD – Philip Rivers: 24/41, 232 yards, 1 TD, 2 INT

**Top rushers**

- DEN – C. J. Anderson: 29 rushes, 85 yards
- SD – Branden Oliver: 12 rushes, 26 yards

**Top receivers**

- DEN – Demaryius Thomas: 6 receptions, 123 yards, 1 TD
- SD – Antonio Gates: 6 receptions, 54 yards, 1 TD

**Top tacklers**

- DEN – Aqib Talib: 7 tackles, 1 assist, 1 interception
- SD – Jahleel Addae and Eric Weddle: 7 tackles each (2 assists by Addae, 1 assist by Weddle)

Coming off their win over the Bills, the Broncos traveled to Qualcomm Stadium for an AFC West rematch with the San Diego Chargers. On the Broncos' second offensive possession, the Broncos advanced to the Chargers' 1-yard line, but were forced to settle for a 19-yard field goal by placekicker Connor Barth. On the Chargers' next possession, defensive end Malik Jackson forced a fumble off Chargers' quarterback Philip Rivers, which was recovered by Broncos' linebacker Von Miller deep in Chargers' territory. However, the Broncos were forced to settle for another Barth field goal early in the second quarter – from 26 yards out. The Chargers then drove to the Broncos' 28-yard line in 14 plays, however, placekicker Nick Novak's 46-yard field goal attempt was blocked by Broncos' defensive tackle Derek Wolfe. The Broncos subsequently marched all the way to the Chargers' 1-yard line, but were once again forced to settle for another 19-yard field goal by Barth, after a 1-yard touchdown run by C. J. Anderson was overturned by an instant replay review just after the two-minute warning. Broncos' quarterback Peyton Manning, battling through flu-like symptoms, suffered a thigh injury while attempting to throw a block on the overturned touchdown run. Backup quarterback Brock Osweiler took over for Manning on the Broncos' next possession. Both teams were forced to punt on their next possessions, and following the Broncos' punt, Chargers' return specialist Eddie Royal ran to the Broncos' 17-yard line with 50 seconds left before halftime. However, the Chargers were forced to settle for a 30-yard field goal by Novak to pull to within 9–3 at halftime.

Both teams were forced to punt on their initial possessions of the second half, and on the Chargers' second possession, Novak missed on a 37-yard field goal attempt that hit the left upright. The Broncos added to their lead near the end of the third quarter, with Manning connecting on a 28-yard touchdown pass to wide receiver Demaryius Thomas – the Broncos' only touchdown of the game. However, the Chargers responded, with an 11-play, 80-yard drive, culminating in a 5-yard touchdown pass from Rivers to tight end Antonio Gates. The Broncos subsequently increased their lead to 19–10 with five minutes remaining in the game, with a 49-yard field goal by Barth. The Chargers attempted a rally, but Rivers was intercepted by Broncos' cornerback Aqib Talib at the Chargers' 34-yard line. Three plays later, after the Chargers had exhausted all three of their team timeouts, Barth kicked his fifth field goal of the game – from 44 yards out. The Chargers had one last offensive possession, however, Rivers was intercepted by Broncos' safety Rahim Moore near the goal line just before the two-minute warning to seal the victory for the Broncos.

Notes

With the win, the Broncos clinched their fourth consecutive AFC West division title, and swept their division rivals on the road for the fifth time in six seasons.

==== Week 16: at Cincinnati Bengals ====
Week Sixteen: Denver Broncos at Cincinnati Bengals – Game summary

Quarter	1	2	3	4	Total
Broncos	7	0	21	0	**28**
**Bengals**	7	13	7	10	**37**

at Paul Brown Stadium, Cincinnati, Ohio

- Date: December 22
- Game time: 8:30 pm. EST/6:30 pm. MST
- Game weather: 47 °F (8 °C), cloudy
- Game attendance: 66,107
- Referee: Bill Vinovich
- TV announcers (ESPN): Mike Tirico, Jon Gruden and Lisa Salters
- Recap, Gamebook

Game information

**First quarter**

- DEN – 10:32 Aqib Talib 33-yard interception return for a TD, Connor Barth kick. (DEN 7–0)
- CIN – 10:09 Jeremy Hill 85-yard TD run, Mike Nugent kick. Drive: 1 play, 85 yards, 0:23. (tied 7–7)

**Second quarter**

- CIN – 10:23 Mike Nugent 37-yard FG. Drive: 10 plays, 26 yards, 5:23. (CIN 10–7)
- CIN – 7:56 Jermaine Gresham 2-yard TD pass from Andy Dalton, Mike Nugent kick. Drive: 4 plays, 22 yards, 1:54. (CIN 17–7)
- CIN – 1:03 Mike Nugent 49-yard FG. Drive: 10 plays, 54 yards, 3:27. (CIN 20–7)

**Third quarter**

- DEN – 14:12 C. J. Anderson 1-yard TD run, Connor Barth kick. Drive: 3 plays, 21 yards, 0:48. (CIN 20–14)
- CIN – 12:35 Giovani Bernard 22-yard TD pass from Andy Dalton, Mike Nugent kick. Drive: 3 plays, 27 yards, 1:37. (CIN 27–14)
- DEN – 9:08 Emmanuel Sanders 4-yard TD pass from Peyton Manning, Connor Barth kick. Drive: 9 plays, 79 yards, 3:27. (CIN 27–21)
- DEN – 1:29 Emmanuel Sanders 5-yard TD pass from Peyton Manning, Connor Barth kick. Drive: 8 plays, 91 yards, 3:31. (DEN 28–27)

**Fourth quarter**

- CIN – 7:49 Mike Nugent 23-yard FG.Drive: 4 plays, 7 yards, 1:54. (CIN 30–28)
- CIN – 2:41 Dre Kirkpatrick 30-yard interception return for a TD, Mike Nugent kick. **(CIN 37–28)**

**Top passers**

- DEN – Peyton Manning: 28/44, 311 yards, 2 TD, 4 INT
- CIN – Andy Dalton, 17/26, 146 yards, 2 TD, 1 INT

**Top rushers**

- DEN – C. J. Anderson: 8 receptions, 83 yards, 1 TD
- CIN – Jeremy Hill: 22 receptions, 147 yards, 1 TD

**Top receivers**

- DEN – Demaryius Thomas: 7 receptions, 115 yards
- CIN – Jermaine Gresham: 9 receptions, 62 yards, 1 TD

**Top tacklers**

- DEN – T. J. Ward and Malik Jackson: 5 tackles each (4 assists by Ward)
- CIN – Vincent Rey: 7 tackles, 4 assists

Coming off their AFC West division-clinching win over the Chargers, the Broncos traveled to Paul Brown Stadium for an AFC duel against the Cincinnati Bengals on Monday Night Football. The Broncos grabbed the early lead, with cornerback Aqib Talib returning an interception off Bengals' quarterback Andy Dalton 33 yards for a touchdown. However, on the first play of the Bengals' third possession, running back Jeremy Hill reeled off an 85-yard touchdown run to tie the score. The Bengals claimed the lead in the second quarter, with a 37-yard field goal by placekicker Mike Nugent. On the Broncos' next possession, quarterback Peyton Manning was intercepted by Bengals' safety Reggie Nelson, and the Bengals capitalized, with Dalton connecting on a 2-yard touchdown pass to wide receiver Jermaine Gresham. A 49-yard field goal by Nugent with one minute remaining in the first half increased the Bengals' lead to 20–7. The Broncos had one last possession before halftime, however, placekicker Connor Barth missed on a 49-yard field goal attempt.

On the Broncos' initial possession of the second half, return specialist Omar Bolden returned the opening kickoff to the Bengals' 21-yard line. Four plays later, running back C. J. Anderson scored on a 1-yard touchdown run. However, the Bengals had a response, as Adam Jones advanced the ensuing kickoff to the Broncos' 27-yard line. Three plays later, Dalton threw a 22-yard touchdown pass to wide receiver Giovani Bernard. The Broncos then scored 14 unanswered points, with Manning throwing a pair of touchdown passes to wide receiver Emmanuel Sanders – from 4 and 5 yards out – to give the Broncos a 28–27 lead. The second scoring play came after Broncos' linebacker Von Miller forced a fumble off Hill just as the Bengals were attempting to add to their lead. Rain started to fall in the fourth quarter, and on the Broncos' first fourth quarter possession, Manning was intercepted by Jones deep in Broncos' territory, however, a 15-yard taunting penalty on Nelson pushed the Bengals out of field goal range. The Broncos were forced to punt on their next possession, and return specialist Brandon Tate advanced all the way to the Broncos' 9-yard line. The Broncos defense forced the Bengals to settle for a 23-yard field goal by Nugent to give the Bengals a 30–28 lead with 7:53 remaining in the game. The two teams traded punts on their next possessions, and the Broncos attempted a rally, however, Bengals' cornerback Dre Kirkpatrick returned an interception off Manning 30 yards for a touchdown. With the rain intensifying, the Broncos had one last possession, but Manning threw another interception to Kirkpatrick, this one deep in Bengals' territory – Manning's fourth interception of the game – to seal the victory for the Bengals.

Notes

This was Peyton Manning's first loss to the Bengals in nine career games.

==== Week 17: vs. Oakland Raiders ====
Week Seventeen: Oakland Raiders at Denver Broncos – Game summary

Quarter	1	2	3	4	Total
Raiders	7	0	7	0	**14**
**Broncos**	10	10	10	17	**47**

at Sports Authority Field at Mile High, Denver, Colorado

- Date: December 28
- Game time: 2:25 pm. MST
- Game weather: 40 °F (4 °C), partly cloudy
- Game attendance: 76,929
- Referee: Clete Blakeman
- TV announcers (CBS): Greg Gumbel, Trent Green and Evan Washburn
- Recap, Gamebook

Game information

**First quarter**

- DEN – 9:40 Connor Barth 49-yard FG. Drive: 8 plays, 23 yards, 3:40. (DEN 3–0)
- DEN – 5:37 C. J. Anderson 11-yard TD run, Connor Barth kick. Drive: 4 plays, 51 yards, 1:34. (DEN 10–0)
- OAK – 3:42 Keith McGill 18-yard fumble return for a TD, Sebastian Janikowski kick. (DEN 10–7)

**Second quarter**

- DEN – 13:08 C. J. Anderson 1-yard TD run, Connor Barth kick. Drive: 10 plays, 80 yards, 5:34. (DEN 17–7)
- DEN – 0:23 Connor Barth 36-yard FG. Drive: 9 plays, 56 yards, 2:09. (DEN 20–7)

**Third quarter**

- DEN – 14:08 C. J. Anderson 25-yard TD run, Connor Barth kick. Drive: 2 plays, 30 yards, 0:52. (DEN 27–7)
- OAK – 8:55 Jamize Olawale 1-yard TD pass from Derek Carr, Sebastian Janikowski kick. Drive: 10 plays, 80 yards, 5:13. (DEN 27–14)
- DEN – 5:38 Connor Barth 35-yard FG. Drive: 8 plays, 63 yards, 3:17. (DEN 30–14)

**Fourth quarter**

- DEN – 10:18 Connor Barth 21-yard FG. Drive: 15 plays, 86 yards, 5:59. (DEN 33–14)
- DEN – 4:48 Tony Carter 20-yard fumble return for a TD, Connor Barth kick. (DEN 40–14)
- DEN – 1:56 Virgil Green 1-yard TD pass from Brock Osweiler, Connor Barth kick. Drive: 6 plays, 44 yards, 2:24. **(DEN 47–14)**

**Top passers**

- OAK – Derek Carr: 18/36, 158 yards, 1 TD, 1 INT
- DEN – Peyton Manning: 21/37, 273 yards

**Top rushers**

- OAK – Latavius Murray: 10 rushes, 37 yards
- DEN – C. J. Anderson: 13 rushes, 87 yards, 3 TD

**Top receivers**

- OAK – Latavius Murray: 4 receptions, 60 yards
- DEN – Demaryius Thomas: 8 receptions, 115 yards

**Top tacklers**

- OAK – Ray-Ray Armstrong: 6 tackles, 2 assists, 1 forced fumble
- DEN – Todd Davis: 5 tackles, 1 assist

Hoping to rebound from their Monday night loss to the Bengals, the Broncos returned home for an AFC West rematch with the Oakland Raiders. A 49-yard field goal by placekicker Connor Barth and an 11-yard touchdown run by running back C. J. Anderson gave the Broncos a 10–0 lead in the first quarter. The Raiders got on the scoreboard, when defensive end Justin Tuck deflected a lateral by quarterback Peyton Manning that was intended for wide receiver Emmanuel Sanders, and cornerback Keith McGill recovered and ran 18 yards for a touchdown. The Broncos subsequently added to their lead, with a 1-yard touchdown run by Anderson early in the second quarter, followed by a 36-yard field goal by Barth just before halftime and Anderson scoring his third rushing touchdown of the game – a 25 yarder on the opening possession of the second half. A 1-yard touchdown pass from Raiders' quarterback Derek Carr to running back Jamize Olawale narrowed the Broncos' lead to 27–14 midway through the third quarter. However, the Broncos pulled away with 20 unanswered points. Barth added two more field goals – a 35-yarder followed in the fourth quarter by a 21-yarder. Later in the fourth quarter, linebacker Lerentee McCray forced a fumble off Carr, and cornerback Tony Carter recovered and ran 20 yards for a touchdown. With the Broncos comfortably ahead, Manning was replaced by backup quarterback Brock Osweiler, and Osweiler connected with tight end Virgil Green on a 1-yard touchdown pass to complete the scoring.

Notes

With the win, the Broncos finished the regular season at 12–4, tied with the New England Patriots for the AFC's best record. However, the Patriots earned the No. 1 seed based on their head-to-head win over the Broncos in Week 9. The Broncos went 8–0 at home for the first time since 2005, and for the sixth time in franchise history. The Broncos won their seventh consecutive game against the Raiders, tying their longest winning streak against the Raiders since 1997–2000.

=== Standings ===
==== Division ====
AFC West
	W	L	T	PCT	DIV	CONF	PF	PA	STK
^{(2)} Denver Broncos	12	4	0	.750	6–0	10–2	482	354	W1
Kansas City Chiefs (Note: Kansas City is ranked ahead of San Diego based on head-to-head sweep (Week 7, 23–20; Week 17, 19–7).)	9	7	0	.563	3–3	7–5	353	281	W1
San Diego Chargers	9	7	0	.563	2–4	6–6	348	348	L1
Oakland Raiders	3	13	0	.188	1–5	2–10	253	452	L1

==== Conference ====
AFC
#	Team	Division	W	L	T	PCT	DIV	CONF	SOS	SOV	STK
**Division leaders**
1 (Note: New England defeated Denver head-to-head (Week 9, 43–21).)	New England Patriots	East	12	4	0	.750	4–2	9–3	.514	.487	L1
2	Denver Broncos	West	12	4	0	.750	6–0	10–2	.521	.484	W1
3 (Note: Pittsburgh defeated Indianapolis head-to-head (Week 8, 51–34).)	Pittsburgh Steelers	North	11	5	0	.688	4–2	9–3	.451	.486	W4
4	Indianapolis Colts	South	11	5	0	.688	6–0	9–3	.479	.372	W1
**Wild Cards**
5	Cincinnati Bengals	North	10	5	1	.656	3–3	7–5	.498	.425	L1
6	Baltimore Ravens	North	10	6	0	.625	3–3	6–6	.475	.378	W1
**Did not qualify for the postseason**
7 (Note: Kansas City finished ahead of San Diego in the AFC West based on head-to-head sweep (Week 7, 23–20; Week 17, 19–7). Houston finished ahead of Kansas City and Buffalo based on conference record. Kansas City finished ahead of Buffalo based on head-to-head victory (Week 10, 17–13). San Diego finished ahead of Buffalo based on head-to-head victory (Week 3, 22–10).)	Houston Texans	South	9	7	0	.563	4–2	8–4	.447	.299	W2
8	Kansas City Chiefs	West	9	7	0	.563	3–3	7–5	.512	.500	W1
9	San Diego Chargers	West	9	7	0	.563	2–4	6–6	.512	.403	L1
10	Buffalo Bills	East	9	7	0	.563	4–2	5–7	.516	.486	W1
11	Miami Dolphins	East	8	8	0	.500	3–3	6–6	.512	.406	L1
12	Cleveland Browns	North	7	9	0	.438	2–4	4–8	.479	.371	L5
13	New York Jets	East	4	12	0	.250	1–5	4–8	.543	.375	W1
14 (Note: Jacksonville finished ahead of Oakland based on record vs. common opponents (1–4 to 0–5).)	Jacksonville Jaguars	South	3	13	0	.188	1–5	2–10	.514	.313	L1
15	Oakland Raiders	West	3	13	0	.188	1–5	2–10	.570	.542	L1
16	Tennessee Titans	South	2	14	0	.125	1–5	2–10	.506	.375	L10
**Tiebreakers** (Note: When breaking ties for three or more teams under the NFL's rules, they are first broken within divisions, then comparing only the highest ranked remaining team from each division.)

=== Statistics ===
==== Team leaders ====
Category	Player(s)	Value
Passing yards	Peyton Manning	4,727
Passing touchdowns	Peyton Manning	39
Rushing yards	C. J. Anderson	849
Rushing touchdowns	C. J. Anderson	8
Receptions	Demaryius Thomas	111
Receiving yards	Demaryius Thomas	1,619 *
Receiving touchdowns	Julius Thomas	12
Points	Julius Thomas	72
Kickoff return yards	Omar Bolden	429
Punt return yards	Isaiah Burse	211
Tackles	Brandon Marshall	113
Sacks	Von Miller	14
Forced fumbles	David Bruton; Bradley Roby; Rahim Moore; DeMarcus Ware	2
Interceptions	Aqib Talib; Rahim Moore	4

*	Indicates a new single-season franchise record.

Source for this section: Denver Broncos' official website.

==== League rankings ====
Offense
Category	Value	NFL rank (out of 32)
Total yards	402.9 YPG	4th
Rushing yards	111.6 YPG	15th
Yards per rush	4	21st
Passing yards	291.3 YPG	4th
Yards per pass	7.9	5th
Yards per play	6	3rd
Scoring	30.1 PPG	2nd
Pass completions	399/607 (.657)	8th
Third downs	94/213 (.441)	8th
Possession average	30:46	12th
Fewest sacks allowed	17	1st
Turnover differential	+5	T–11th

Defense
Category	Value	NFL rank (out of 32)
Total yards	305.2 YPG	3rd
Rushing yards	79.8 YPG	2nd
Yards per rush	3.7	4th
Passing yards	225.4 YPG	9th
Yards per pass	6	1st
Yards per play	4.7	2nd
Scoring	22.1 PPG	T–16th
Pass completions	399/642 (.621)	14th
Third downs	81/222 (.365)	5th
Sacks	41	T–9th
Forced fumbles	15	T–12th
Fumble recoveries	7	T–22nd
Interceptions	18	T–7th

Special teams
Category	Value	NFL rank (out of 32)
Kickoff returns	25.1 YPR	8th
Punt returns	7.2 YPR	20th
Gross punting	44.2 YPP	22nd
Net punting	37.6 YPP	28th
Kickoff coverage	25.9 YPR	24th
Punt coverage	11.2 YPR	29th

Source for this section: NFL.com.

== Postseason ==
=== Schedule ===
Round	Date	Opponent (seed)	Result	Record	Venue	Recap
Wild Card	First-round bye					
Divisional	January 11, 2015	Indianapolis Colts (4)	L 13–24	0–1	Sports Authority Field at Mile High	Recap

=== Game summaries ===
==== AFC Divisional Playoffs: vs. (4) Indianapolis Colts ====
AFC Divisional Playoffs: (4) Indianapolis Colts at (2) Denver Broncos – Game summary

Quarter	1	2	3	4	Total
Colts	0	14	7	3	24
Broncos	7	3	0	3	13

at Sports Authority Field at Mile High, Denver, Colorado

- Date: January 11, 2015
- Game time: 2:40 p.m. MST
- Game weather: 40 °F (4 °C), cloudy
- Game attendance: 76,867
- Referee: Bill Leavy
- TV announcers (CBS): Jim Nantz, Phil Simms and Tracy Wolfson
- Recap, Gamebook

Game information

First quarter

- DEN – 10:00 Demaryius Thomas 1-yard TD pass from Peyton Manning, Connor Barth kick. Drive: 7 plays, 68 yards, 3:37. (DEN 7–0)

Second quarter

- IND – 14;14 Dan Herron 6-yard TD run, Adam Vinatieri kick. Drive: 9 plays, 73 yards, 5:05. (tied 7–7)
- IND – 7:23 Dwayne Allen 3-yard TD pass from Andrew Luck, Adam Vinatieri kick. Drive: 8 plays, 41 yards, 3:41. (IND 14–7)
- DEN – 0:02 Connor Barth 45-yard FG. Drive: 7 plays, 25 yards, 1:26. (IND 14–10)

Third quarter

- IND – 8:21 Hakeem Nicks 15-yard TD pass from Andrew Luck, Adam Vinatieri kick. Drive: 11 plays, 72 yards, 5:16. (IND 21–10)

Fourth quarter

- DEN – Connor Barth 41-yard FG. Drive: 14 plays, 53 yards, 6:23. (IND 21–13)
- IND – 4:06 Adam Vinatieri 30-yard FG. Drive: 13 plays, 54 yards, 8:14. (IND 24–13)

Top passers

- IND – Andrew Luck: 27/43, 265 yards, 2 TD, 2 INT
- DEN – Peyton Manning: 26/46, 211 yards, 1 TD

Top rushers

- IND – Dan Herron: 23 rushes, 63 yards, 1 TD
- DEN – C. J. Anderson: 18 rushes, 80 yards

Top receivers

- IND – T. Y. Hilton: 4 receptions, 72 yards
- DEN – Demaryius Thomas: 5 receptions, 59 yards, 1 TD

Top tacklers

- IND – D'Qwell Jackson: 10 tackles, 1 assist
- DEN – Von Miller and Steven Johnson: 5 tackles, 1 assist

Following a first-round bye, the Broncos began their run in the 2014–15 NFL playoffs at home by welcoming the Indianapolis Colts, in a re-match of their Week 1 meeting. Coming into the game, the Broncos were a perfect 8–0 at home during the regular season. The Broncos grabbed the early lead, with a 1-yard touchdown pass from quarterback Peyton Manning to wide receiver Demaryius Thomas, which was the only scoring play of the first quarter. After the two teams exchange punts, the Colts tied the game at the beginning of the second quarter, with running back Dan Herron rushing for a 6-yard touchdown. The Colts' defense forced a fumble off Manning on the Broncos' first possession of the second quarter, and the Colts capitalized, with quarterback Andrew Luck connecting on a 3-yard touchdown pass to wide receiver Dwayne Allen. Just after the two-minute warning, Luck was intercepted by Broncos' cornerback Bradley Roby, and a 45-yard field goal by placekicker Connor Barth pulled the Broncos to within a 14–10 deficit at halftime.

The Broncos' offense went three-and-out on the opening possession of the second half, and the Colts subsequently added to their lead, with an 11-play, 72-yard drive that chewed up over eight minutes, culminating in a 15-yard touchdown pass from Luck to wide receiver Hakeem Nicks. The Broncos were forced to punt on their next possession, and after Luck was intercepted by Broncos' safety Rahim Moore, the Broncos marched down the field, but were forced to settle on a 41-yard field goal by Barth early in the fourth quarter. The drive was kept alive by a critical fourth-down conversion by running back C. J. Anderson. Both teams went three-and-out on their next possessions, and the Colts added to their lead, with another time-consuming drive that chewed up eight minutes off the clock, culminating in a 30-yard field goal by placekicker Adam Vinatieri with 4:11 remaining in the game. On the sixth play of the Broncos' next drive, the Broncos faced a 4th-and-8 at their own 46-yard line, however, a pass completion from Manning to Anderson fell one yard short of a first down, turning the football over on downs with 3:04 remaining in the game. The Broncos challenged the play, thinking that Anderson had achieved the necessary yardage needed for a first down before his knee went down, however, the ruling was upheld. The Colts' offense forced the Broncos to burn the remaining two of their three team timeouts before the two-minute warning. The Broncos had one final possession, and advanced to as far as the Colts' 23-yard line with nine seconds remaining in the game, but without any timeouts, the game ended. As of 2025, this remains the Broncos last Divisional Round loss.

== Records and milestones ==
Numerous individual, franchise and league records and milestones were either tied, reached or broken during the season:

=== Team ===
- Week 9: The Broncos scored 21 points in their 43–21 loss to the New England Patriots. It was their 29th consecutive game scoring 20 or more points. At the time, it surpassed an NFL record that was previously set by the St. Louis Rams in the 1999 and 2000 seasons, until the Baltimore Ravens surpassed that record in 2020.
- Week 15: The Broncos' 22–10 win over the San Diego Chargers was their 12th consecutive divisional road win, tying an NFL record that the San Francisco 49ers set from 1987 to 1990; John Fox became only the second head coach in NFL history to win four division titles in the first four seasons with a team, joining Chuck Knox.
- 2014 season: The Broncos set a new franchise record for players selected to the Pro Bowl, with 11.

=== Peyton Manning ===
- Week 1: With the Broncos' win over the Indianapolis Colts, for whom he played from 1998 to 2010, Peyton Manning became only the second quarterback in NFL history to have defeated all 32 NFL teams, the other one being Brett Favre.
- Week 3: Threw his 100th touchdown pass in his 35th game as a Bronco, becoming the fastest quarterback in NFL history to achieve that feat with a single team, shattering Dan Marino's previous record of 44 games.
- Week 5: Became the second quarterback in NFL history to achieve 500 career touchdown passes, joining Brett Favre; set a new career high for passing yards in a single game, with 479.
- Week 7: Surpassed Craig Morton (11,895) for second-place on the Broncos' all-time list for passing yardage (11,984), behind John Elway (51,475). At the time, Manning was the NFL's all-time leader in career touchdown passes, until New Orleans Saints' quarterback Drew Brees surpassed that record in 2019.
- Week 9: Set a new NFL record with his 14th consecutive multi-touchdown passing game. At the time, Manning was the NFL's all-time leader in 400-yard passing games, until Drew Brees surpassed that record in 2016.
- Week 10: At the time, Manning surpassed Drew Brees for the most games with five touchdown passes in NFL history, with 9; Brees later tied this record, with a seven-touchdown passing performance in 2015.
- 2014 season: Manning was selected to his 14th Pro Bowl, tying Tony Gonzalez and Bruce Matthews for the most Pro Bowl selections in NFL history.

=== Other players ===
- Connor Barth: During wins over the Kansas City Chiefs in Week 13 and San Diego Chargers in Week 15, Barth kicked five field goals in each game, which, at the time, tied a franchise record for field goals in a single game. Brandon McManus surpassed that record with a six-field goal performance in 2020.
- Demaryius Thomas:
  - Week 5: Set a new franchise record for receiving yards in a single game, with 226, surpassing the previous record of 214 that Shannon Sharpe set in 2002.
  - Week 9: Set a new franchise record with his fifth consecutive 100-yard receiving game.
  - Week 15: Tied a single-season franchise record with his eighth 100-yard receiving game, which Rod Smith previously set in the 2000 season.
  - Week 16: Set a new franchise record for 100-yard receiving games in a single season; became only the third wide receiver in NFL history to achieve three consecutive seasons of at least 1,400 yards and 10 touchdown catches – the other two are Marvin Harrison and Jerry Rice.
  - Week 17: Set a new franchise record for receiving yards in a single season, with 1,619, surpassing the previous record of 1,602 that Rod Smith set in the 2000 season. Thomas also finished with 111 receptions, two shy of the franchise record that Rod Smith set in 2000.
- Julius Thomas:
  - Week 9: Became the first tight end in franchise history to achieve double-digit touchdowns in back-to-back seasons.
  - Week 10: Became the first tight end in NFL history to achieve back-to-back 12-touchdown seasons; tied an NFL record for the most touchdown catches through nine games, with 12, and the first to do so since Randy Moss in 2007.
- Wes Welker: During the Broncos' Week 5 win over the Arizona Cardinals, Welker became the NFL's all-time leader in career pass receptions amongst undrafted wide receivers, surpassing former Broncos' wide receiver Rod Smith.

== Awards and honors ==
Recipient	Award(s)
C. J. Anderson	Week 13: FedEx Ground Player of the Week; Week 17: AFC Offensive Player of the Week
Connor Barth	December: AFC Special Teams Player of the Month
Ben Garland	Named as the team's Walter Payton Man of the Year
Chris Harris, Jr.	2014 season: Named to the Pro Football Writers of America's All-AFC team
Peyton Manning	Week 5: FedEx Air Player of the Week; Week 7: American Football Conference|AFC Offensive Player of the Week; Named to the USA Football All Fundamentals Team; 2014 season: Best Record-Breaking Performance at 2015 ESPY Awards (NFL record-breaking 509th career touchdown pass)
Von Miller	October: AFC Defensive Player of the Month; 2014 season: Named to the Pro Football Writers of America's All-NFL team
Aqib Talib	Week 15: AFC Defensive Player of the Week
Demaryius Thomas	Week 5: AFC Offensive Player of the Week; 2014 season: Named to the Pro Football Writers of America's All-AFC team
Julius Thomas	Week 1: AFC Offensive Player of the Week

=== Pro Bowl and All-Pro selections ===
On December 23, 2014, an NFL-high nine Broncos were selected to the 2015 Pro Bowl: Offensive tackle Ryan Clady, cornerbacks Chris Harris, Jr. and Aqib Talib, quarterback Peyton Manning, linebacker Von Miller, wide receiver Demaryius Thomas, tight end Julius Thomas, safety T. J. Ward and defensive end DeMarcus Ware. Wide receiver Emmanuel Sanders and running back C. J. Anderson were later added to the Pro Bowl roster as injury replacements – Sanders on January 15, 2015 and Anderson on January 19, 2015. Manning withdrew from the Pro Bowl due to the quad injury that he suffered during a Week 15 game vs. the San Diego Chargers and played through during the playoff loss to the Indianapolis Colts. Harris, Miller and Demaryius Thomas were also voted to the 2014 All-Pro Second Team.

== Other news and notes ==
- On February 12, 2014, John Elway, the team's Executive Vice-president of Football Operations since 2011, received a three-year contract extension from the Broncos that will run through the 2017 season. That same day, Elway was also officially given the title of general manager.
- On May 1, the Broncos exercised a fifth-year option on the contract of linebacker Von Miller, which would pay him a $9.75 million salary for the 2015 season. Miller served a six-game suspension in 2013 for violating the NFL's substance-abuse policy and suffered a late-season knee injury that caused him to miss the playoffs.
- On May 24, the Broncos announced that Matt Russell, the team's director of player personnel since 2012, was sentenced to seven months in jail as the punishment for a July 2013 drunk driving incident in Summit County, Colorado, in which Russell collided with a police vehicle, resulting in an injury to a Breckenridge police officer. Russell also plead guilty to careless driving and possession of an open container of alcohol, and he is eligible to participate in a work release program that could allow him to participate in team travel assignments. On July 21, Russell began a 6 1/2 month work release sentence in an Arapahoe County jail, which is a very short distance from the Broncos' Dove Valley headquarters.
- On November 18, longtime cornerback Champ Bailey, who played with the Broncos from 2004 to 2013, signed a one-day contract with the team in order to officially retire as a Bronco.
- On December 12, the Broncos and cornerback Chris Harris, Jr. agreed on a five-year, $42.5 million contract extension that will run through the 2019 season.
- The Broncos set a new franchise record for regular season home attendance, with 615,517 fans.
