= Nate Irving =

American football player (born 1988)

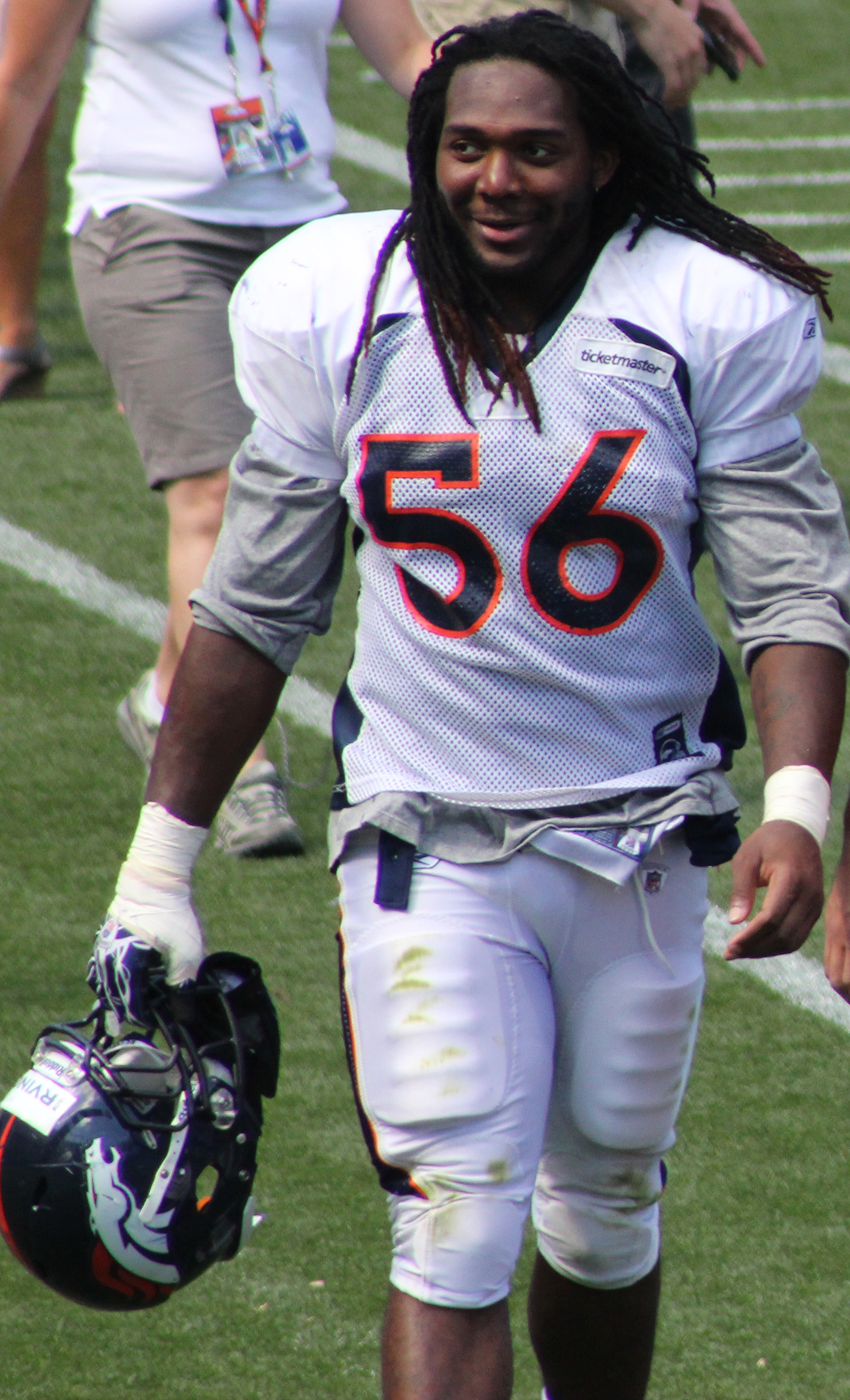
- Irving with the Denver Broncos in 2011

No. 55, 56
- Position: Linebacker

Personal information
- Born: July 12, 1988 (age 38); Newark, New Jersey, U.S.
- Listed height: 6 ft 1 in (1.85 m)
- Listed weight: 253 lb (115 kg)

Career information
- High school: Wallace-Rose Hill (Teachey, North Carolina)
- College: North Carolina State
- NFL draft: 2011: 3rd round, 67th overall pick

Career history
- Denver Broncos (2011–2014); Indianapolis Colts (2015)

Awards and highlights
- First-team All-American (2010); ACC Brian Piccolo Award (2010); First-team All-ACC (2010)

Career NFL statistics
- Total tackles: 118
- Sacks: 3.0
- Forced fumbles: 1
- Stats at Pro Football Reference

Nathaniel Irving (born July 12, 1988) is an American former professional football player who was a linebacker in the National Football League (NFL). He played college football for the NC State Wolfpack and was selected by the Denver Broncos in the third round of the 2011 NFL draft.

== Early life ==
Irving attended Wallace-Rose Hill High School in Teachey, North Carolina, where he tallied 110 tackles, six forced fumbles, three sacks, and one interception in his senior year. Regarded as only a two-star recruit by Rivals.com, he was not listed among the top prospects of the class of 2006.

== College career ==
Irving played college football at NC State. He was a 2010 All-American selection by Sports Illustrated and Scout.com. Irving holds the NCAA FBS record for tackles for loss in a single game with eight in 2010.

== Professional career ==
Pre-draft measurables
Height	Weight	Arm length	Hand span	Wingspan	40-yard dash	10-yard split	20-yard split	20-yard shuttle	Three-cone drill	Vertical jump	Broad jump	Bench press
6 ft 1 in (1.85 m)	240 lb (109 kg)	33 1/4 in (0.84 m)	10 1/4 in (0.26 m)	6 ft 4 7/8 in (1.95 m)	4.74 s	1.71 s	2.78 s	4.25 s	6.97 s	32.5 in (0.83 m)	8 ft 11 in (2.72 m)	27 reps
All values from NFL Combine/Pro Day

=== Denver Broncos ===
Irving was selected in the third round (67th overall) by the Denver Broncos in the 2011 NFL draft. He officially signed with the Broncos on July 29, 2011.

Irving was placed on injured reserve in November 2014 with a knee injury that required surgery. He had 44 tackles through 8 games prior to the injury. Irving became a free agent at the end of the 2014 season.

=== Indianapolis Colts ===
On March 20, 2015, Irving signed a 3-year, $9.25 million contract with the Indianapolis Colts. On December 8, 2015, Irving was placed on injured reserve.

On September 3, 2016, Irving was released by the Colts as part of final roster cuts.

== NFL career statistics ==
Legend
**Bold**	Career high

=== Regular season ===
Year	Team	Games		Tackles					Interceptions					Fumbles			
Year	Team	GP	GS	Cmb	Solo	Ast	Sck	TFL	Int	Yds	TD	Lng	PD	FF	FR	Yds	TD
2011	DEN	**16**	0	4	3	1	0.0	0	0	0	0	0	0	0	0	0	0
2012	DEN	15	0	13	9	4	0.0	0	0	0	0	0	1	0	0	0	0
2013	DEN	15	4	41	**29**	12	**1.0**	**8**	0	0	0	0	1	0	0	0	0
2014	DEN	8	**8**	**46**	26	**20**	**1.0**	6	0	0	0	0	0	0	0	0	0
2015	IND	8	2	14	12	2	**1.0**	3	0	0	0	0	**2**	**1**	0	0	0
		62	14	118	79	39	3.0	17	0	0	0	0	4	1	0	0	0

=== Playoffs ===
Year	Team	Games		Tackles					Interceptions					Fumbles			
Year	Team	GP	GS	Cmb	Solo	Ast	Sck	TFL	Int	Yds	TD	Lng	PD	FF	FR	Yds	TD
2011	DEN	2	0	1	1	0	0.0	0	0	0	0	0	0	0	0	0	0
2012	DEN	1	0	0	0	0	0.0	0	0	0	0	0	0	0	0	0	0
2013	DEN	**3**	**3**	**9**	**8**	**1**	0.0	0	0	0	0	0	**1**	0	0	0	0
		6	3	10	9	1	0.0	0	0	0	0	0	1	0	0	0	0
