= Juwan Thompson =

American football player (born 1992)

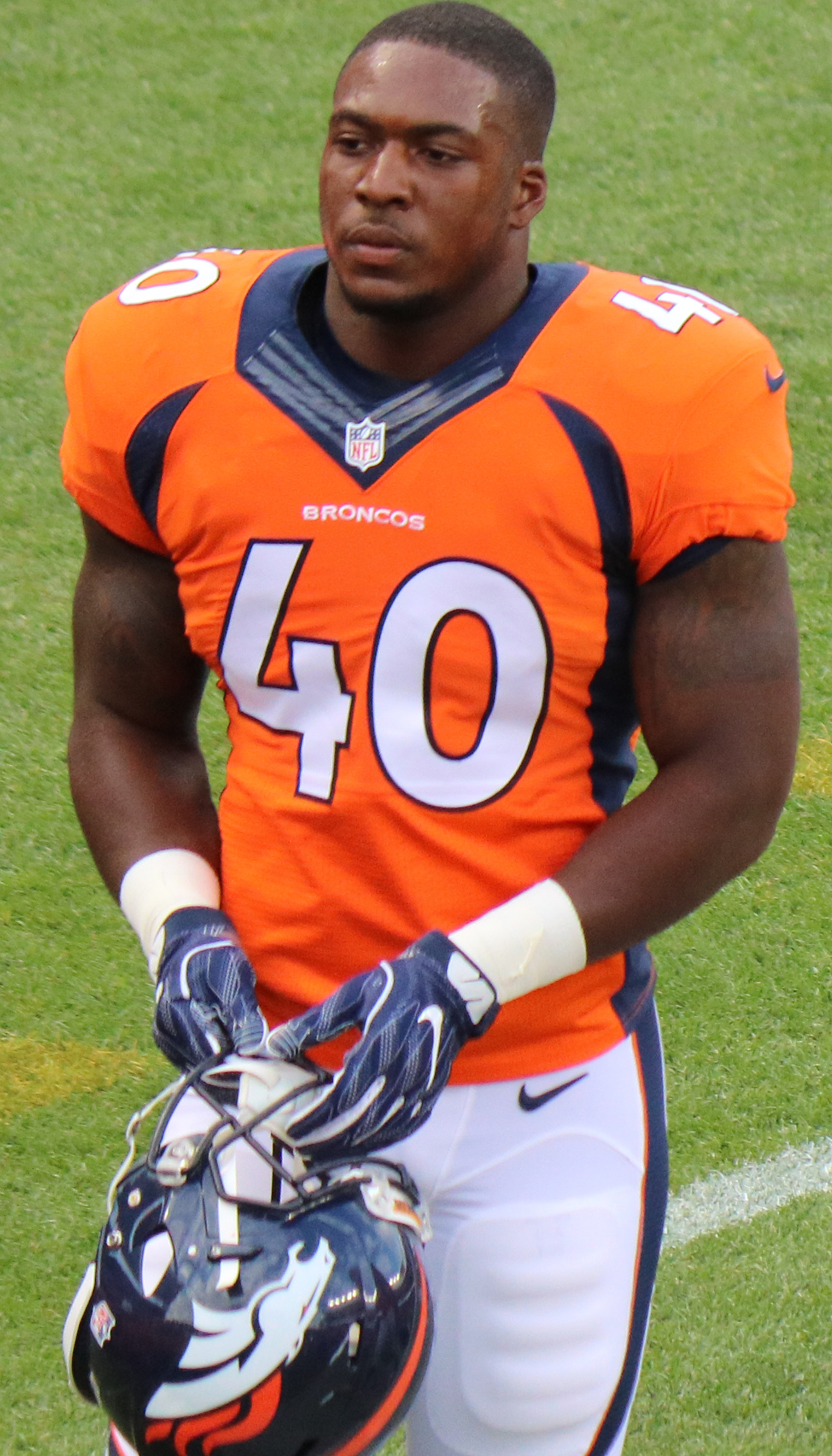
- Thompson with the Denver Broncos in 2016

No. 40
- Position: Running back

Personal information
- Born: May 13, 1992 (age 34); Saint Croix, U.S. Virgin Islands
- Listed height: 5 ft 11 in (1.80 m)
- Listed weight: 225 lb (102 kg)

Career information
- High school: Woodward Academy (College Park, Georgia)
- College: Duke
- NFL draft: 2014: undrafted

Career history
- Denver Broncos (2014–2016)

Awards and highlights
- Super Bowl champion (50)

Career NFL statistics
- Rushing attempts: 80
- Rushing yards: 346
- Rushing touchdowns: 4
- Receptions: 10
- Receiving yards: 76
- Stats at Pro Football Reference

Juwan Thompson (born May 13, 1992) is an American former professional football player who was a running back for three seasons with the Denver Broncos of the National Football League (NFL). He played college football for the Duke Blue Devils. He was signed by the Broncos as an undrafted free agent in 2014.

== College career ==
Thompson played college football at Duke University from 2010 to 2013. He finished his career with 1,244 rushing yards on 274 carries and had nine touchdowns.

== Professional career ==
Thompson was signed by the Denver Broncos after going undrafted in the 2014 NFL draft.

In a game against the Arizona Cardinals, Thompson scored his first career touchdown on an 8-yard run. In a Thursday Night Football game against division rival San Diego Chargers, Thompson ran for two touchdowns as the Broncos went on to win 35–21.

On February 7, 2016, Thompson was part of the Broncos team that won Super Bowl 50. In the game, the Broncos defeated the Carolina Panthers by a score of 24–10. Thompson was inactive for the game.

On September 3, 2016, Thompson was waived by the Broncos. The next day, he was signed to the Broncos' practice squad. He was promoted to the active roster on October 29 after starting running back C. J. Anderson was placed on injured reserve.

On September 2, 2017, Thompson was waived by the Broncos.
