= Chase Vaughn =

American gridiron football player (born 1988)

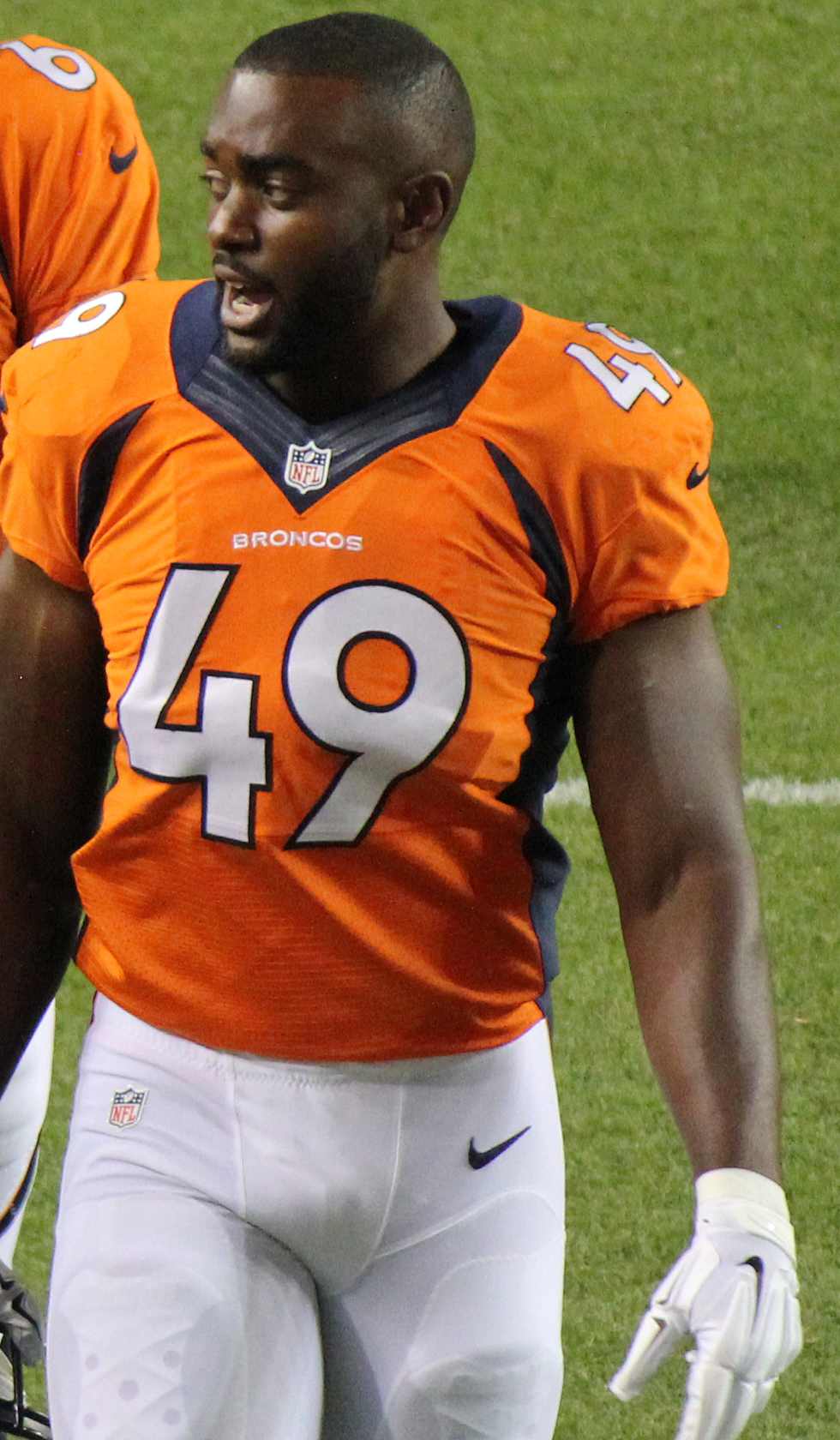
- Vaughn in the 2015 NFL preseason

No. 59, 49
- Position: Linebacker

Personal information
- Born: September 4, 1988 (age 38); Richmond, Virginia, U.S.
- Listed height: 6 ft 2 in (1.88 m)
- Listed weight: 248 lb (112 kg)

Career information
- High school: Smoky Hill (Aurora, Colorado)
- College: Colorado State University-Pueblo
- NFL draft: 2010: undrafted

Career history
- Las Vegas Locomotives (2010)*; Colorado Ice (2011); Las Vegas Locomotives (2011)*; Calgary Stampeders (2012)*; Las Vegas Locomotives (2012); Spokane Shock (2013); Denver Broncos (2014); Winnipeg Blue Bombers (2015)
- * Offseason or practice squad member only

Career AFL statistics
- Total tackles: 3
- Sacks: 1.5
- Forced fumbles: 1
- Pass deflections: 2
- Stats at ArenaFan.com
- Stats at Pro Football Reference
- Stats at CFL.ca (archive)

Chase Vaughn (born September 4, 1988) is an American former football linebacker. He played football at Smoky Hill High School in Aurora, Colorado and college football at Colorado State University-Pueblo in Pueblo, Colorado.

Vaughn was also a member of the Colorado Ice in the Indoor Football League (IFL), and the Las Vegas Locomotives of the United Football League (UFL). He currently holds the CSU-Pueblo record for sacks in a single game (4.5).
