= Nathan Palmer =

American football player (born 1989)

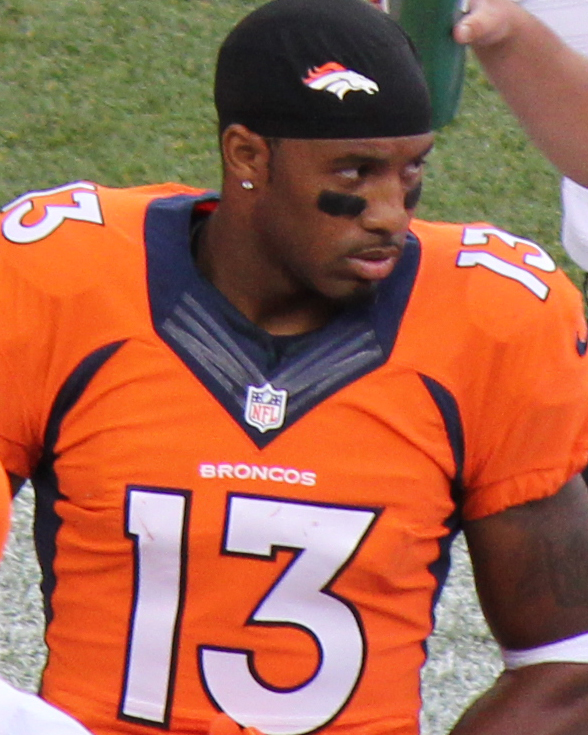
- Palmer with the Denver Broncos

No. 10, 13
- Position: Wide receiver

Personal information
- Born: April 14, 1989 (age 37); Elkhart, Indiana, U.S.
- Listed height: 5 ft 11 in (1.80 m)
- Listed weight: 195 lb (88 kg)

Career information
- High school: Central (Elkhart)
- College: Northern Illinois
- NFL draft: 2012: undrafted

Career history
- San Francisco 49ers (2012)*; Indianapolis Colts (2012–2013); Miami Dolphins (2013)*; Denver Broncos (2013–2014); New England Patriots (2015)*; Chicago Bears (2015)*; Oakland Raiders (2016)*
- * Offseason or practice squad member only

Awards and highlights
- Third-team All-Mid-American Conference (2011)

Career NFL statistics
- Receptions: 1
- Receiving yards: -4
- Stats at Pro Football Reference

Nathan D. Palmer (born April 14, 1989) is an American former professional football player who was a wide receiver in the National Football League (NFL). He played college football for the Northern Illinois Huskies. He is the Passing Game Coordinator and Wide Receivers coach at Elkhart High School.

== College career ==
Palmer attended Northern Illinois University and was named the MVP of the 2011 MAC Championship Game.

== Professional career ==
=== San Francisco 49ers ===
Palmer signed as an undrafted free agent, with the San Francisco 49ers following the 2012 NFL draft. Palmer made the 49ers' practice squad for the 2012 season.

=== Indianapolis Colts ===
On September 24, 2012, Palmer was signed by the Indianapolis Colts off of the 49ers' practice squad. He made his debut during the Colts 30–27 comeback win over the Green Bay Packers. He was waived on August 27, 2013. He was re-signed to the Injured Reserve on August 28, 2013. He was waived from injured reserve with an injury settlement on September 2, 2013.

=== Miami Dolphins ===
On October 30, 2013, Palmer was signed to the Miami Dolphins' practice squad.

=== Denver Broncos ===
On December 24, 2013, the Denver Broncos signed Palmer to their practice squad. On September 3, Palmer was promoted to the 53 man roster.

=== New England Patriots ===
On September 7, 2015, the New England Patriots signed Palmer to their practice squad. On September 18, 2015, Palmer was released from the practice squad.

=== Chicago Bears ===
On October 13, 2015, the Chicago Bears signed Palmer to their practice squad.

On January 4, 2016, Palmer signed a futures contract with the Bears.

=== Oakland Raiders ===
Palmer signed with the Raiders on May 24, 2016. On August 29, 2016, he was released by the Raiders.

== Singing career ==
Nathan Palmer is also known as Denver R&B singer "NaPalm." In 2015 he told Denver's News 7 that " football is his love, but music is his life." He has since then released three projects: Winter Vibes and Summer Vibes in 2017, and Therapy in 2018. He has several new singles with Denver hip-hop artists Top Flite Empire.
