= Jacob Hester =

American football player (born 1985)

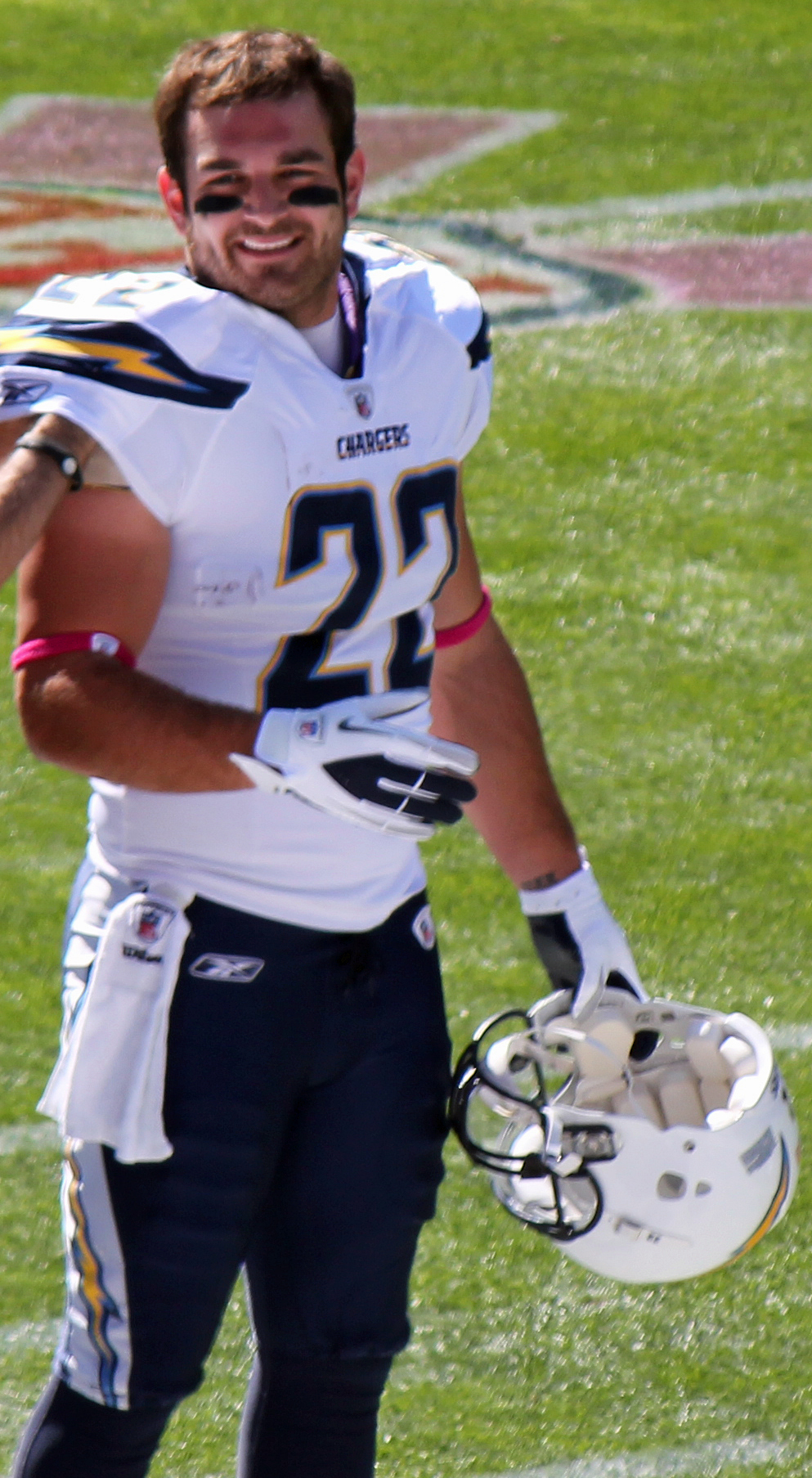
- Hester with the San Diego Chargers in 2011

No. 22, 40
- Position: Fullback

Personal information
- Born: May 8, 1985 (age 41); Shreveport, Louisiana, U.S.
- Listed height: 5 ft 11 in (1.80 m)
- Listed weight: 235 lb (107 kg)

Career information
- High school: Evangel Christian Academy (Shreveport)
- College: LSU (2004–2007)
- NFL draft: 2008: 3rd round, 69th overall pick

Career history
- San Diego Chargers (2008–2011); Denver Broncos (2012)

Awards and highlights
- BCS national champion (2007); Second-team All-SEC (2007); Lowman Trophy Award (2007)

Career NFL statistics
- Rushing yards: 400
- Rushing average: 3.6
- Rushing touchdowns: 3
- Receptions: 56
- Receiving yards: 315
- Receiving touchdowns: 3
- Stats at Pro Football Reference

Jacob Troy Hester (born May 8, 1985) is an American former professional football player who was a fullback in the National Football League (NFL). He was selected by the San Diego Chargers in the third round of the 2008 NFL draft. He played college football for the LSU Tigers.

== Early life ==
Hester attended Evangel Christian Academy in Shreveport, Louisiana where in 2002 he was named Louisiana 5A Offensive MVP. He is the son of Joey and Nancy Hester of Shreveport, Louisiana. He rushed for 868 yards and 22 touchdowns on 182 carries, leading his team to the 5A championship game his senior year. During his junior year, he led his team to the state title, rushing for 1,593 yards and 24 touchdowns on 222 attempts in 2002.

== College career ==
In 2004, Hester played as a freshman, starting one game and seeing action in the other 11. He ran for 123 yards on 20 carries in his freshman year, and added two pass receptions for 21 yards. He also made nine tackles on special teams.

In 2005, Hester started one of LSU's 13 games. In the Peach Bowl against Miami, which the Tigers won, he had 13 rushing attempts and gained 70 yards. For the season, Hester ran the ball 25 times for 114 yards, scoring two touchdowns. In addition, he had 11 receptions for 63 yards; his reception total was second-highest for the team's running backs. He also participated in special teams, recording 14 tackles.

As a junior in 2006, he saw playing time at multiple positions: tailback and fullback. Hester had 35 pass receptions for 269 yards, and ran for 440 yards, while also notching seven tackles on special teams.

As a senior in 2007, the Tigers selected him to be a team captain. He was the starting tailback for the Tigers. He rushed 225 times for 1,103 yards and 12 touchdowns. He added a touchdown catch, and totalled 14 receptions for 106 yards. In LSU's 14 games during the 2007 season, Hester led the Tigers in rushing 10 times. His first 100-yard game came against Florida. Hester gained 106 yards and scored the game-winning touchdown. He was recognized as SEC Offensive Player of the Week and the Sporting News National Player of the Week following the game. Hester's longest run of the season came on an 87-yard touchdown against Louisiana Tech. In LSU's loss to Arkansas, Hester had the most rushing yards of his college career—126 on 28 attempts. In the final game of his college career in the national championship game against Ohio State he rushed 21 times for 86 yards and a touchdown. He did all of this while being a part of a five-man rotation with Keiland Williams, Trindon Holliday, Charles Scott, and Richard Murphy.

== Professional career ==
Pre-draft measurables
| Height | Weight | Arm length | Hand span | 40-yard dash | 10-yard split | 20-yard split | 20-yard shuttle | Three-cone drill | Vertical jump | Broad jump | Bench press |
|---|---|---|---|---|---|---|---|---|---|---|---|
| 5 ft 10 5/8 in (1.79 m) | 226 lb (103 kg) | 31 in (0.79 m) | 10 1/2 in (0.27 m) | 4.61 s | 1.60 s | 2.67 s | 4.24 s | 6.85 s | 29 in (0.74 m) | 9 ft 3 in (2.82 m) | 23 reps |
All values from NFL Combine/Pro Day

=== San Diego Chargers ===
Hester was selected by the San Diego Chargers in the 3rd round, 69th overall, of the 2008 NFL draft with the intention of being converted into a versatile, pass catching Norv Turner style fullback. On July 18, he signed a four-year contract that included a $833,000 signing bonus. His 2008 salary total was $1,128,850.

In his preseason debut with the Chargers, Hester rushed for 49 yards over 13 carries, and scored two touchdowns against the Dallas Cowboys. In the Chargers' preseason game against the St. Louis Rams, Hester carried for 59 yards in 12 carries.

Hester scored his first regular season touchdown against the Indianapolis Colts on November 23, on a one-yard pass from Philip Rivers. Despite fumbling only once in over 460 touches for LSU, Hester fumbled in Week 6 against the New England Patriots on only his second NFL carry.

Hester was given charge of the play call on punts, and in a game versus Atlanta, Hester noticed a different formation from the Falcons and checked off to a fake. David Binn snapped the ball short to Hester, and with receiver Legedu Naanee blocking the defensive end, Hester ran for a 28-yard gain.

Despite primarily being a halfback his entire college career, Hester displayed his improved blocking ability in the 2008 wild card playoff game against the Indianapolis Colts, laying a block that effectively took two men out of the play and sprung Darren Sproles to the game-winning score on a 22-yard burst 7:20 minutes into overtime, capping an impressive upset playoff win over the Indianapolis Colts.

For the 2008 season, Hester finished with a total of 95 rushing yards on only 19 carries. He also gained 91 yards on 12 receptions.

In 2009, Hester had a blocked punt return for a TD against the Kansas City Chiefs and a fumble recovery touchdown on a punt against the Pittsburgh Steelers.

On August 31, 2012, the Chargers released Hester. After injuries to the Chicago Bears backfield in September, Hester was brought in to workout with the team, but was not signed.

=== Denver Broncos ===
On November 26, 2012, Hester was signed by the Denver Broncos after starting running back Willis McGahee was put on the IR with designation to return.

In Week 17 of the 2012 season, he amassed a career-high 55 rushing yards on seven carries – a mark of nearly eight yards per attempt. He helped the team secure the #1 seed in the AFC going into the postseason. On September 1, 2013, Hester was cut by the Denver Broncos.
