= Mitch Unrein =

American football player (born 1987)

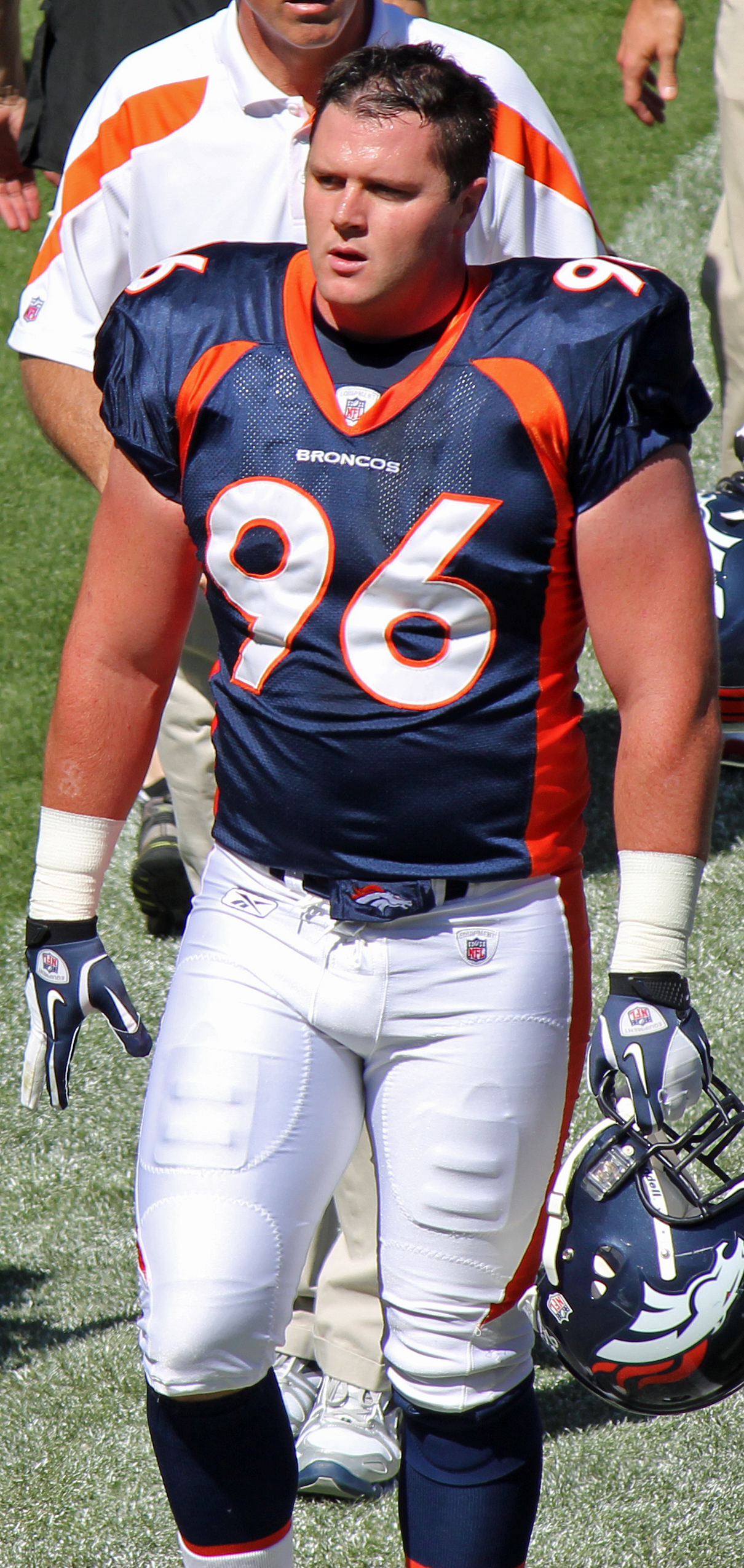
- Unrein with the Denver Broncos in 2011

No. 96, 76, 98
- Position: Defensive tackle

Personal information
- Born: March 25, 1987 (age 39); Eaton, Colorado, U.S.
- Listed height: 6 ft 4 in (1.93 m)
- Listed weight: 299 lb (136 kg)

Career information
- High school: Eaton
- College: Wyoming
- NFL draft: 2010: undrafted

Career history
- Houston Texans (2010)*; Denver Broncos (2010–2014); San Diego Chargers (2015); Chicago Bears (2015–2017); Tampa Bay Buccaneers (2018)
- * Offseason or practice squad member only

Career NFL statistics
- Total tackles: 126
- Sacks: 4.5
- Fumble recoveries: 1
- Total touchdowns: 1
- Stats at Pro Football Reference

Mitch Unrein (born March 25, 1987) is an American former professional football player who was a defensive tackle in the National Football League (NFL). He was signed by the Houston Texans as an undrafted free agent in 2010. He played college football for the Wyoming Cowboys.

== Professional career ==
=== Denver Broncos ===
Unrein made his NFL debut in Week 1 of the 2011 season against the Raiders. He made his first NFL start in Week 2 of the 2012 season against the Falcons. In a game against the Tampa Bay Buccaneers on December 2, 2012, Unrein lined up for the first time as at the fullback position. He proceeded to catch his first career touchdown pass from quarterback Peyton Manning.

On April 11, 2013, Unrein signed a one-year, $630,000 tender.

The Broncos placed a one-year $1.431 million tender on Unrein on March 7, 2014.

=== San Diego Chargers ===
Unrein signed with the San Diego Chargers on March 19, 2015.

On September 24, 2015, the San Diego Chargers reinforced the tight end position, bringing back Kyle Miller nine days after he was waived on September 15. To make room, the team released Unrein.

=== Chicago Bears ===
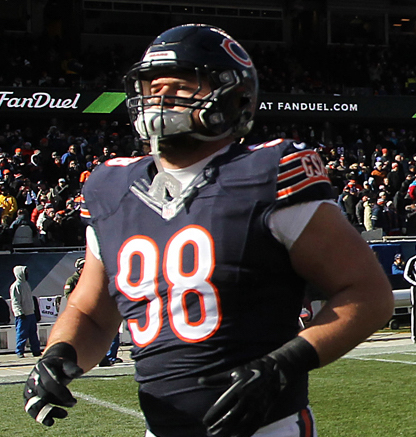
Unrein with the Chicago Bears in 2015

Unrein was signed by the Chicago Bears on September 25, 2015. On November 9, 2015, he lined up at fullback against the San Diego Chargers. This was the first of many times he was used like this by the Bears. He ended the 2015 season with 32 tackles, two tackles-for-loss, and a sack.

On March 12, 2016, Unrein was re-signed by the Bears to a two-year contract. He appeared in 13 games and started nine in the 2016 season. He recorded one sack on the season, in Week 14.

In 2017, Unrein started eight out of 12 games played, recording a career-high 32 tackles and 2.5 sacks. He was placed on injured reserve on December 5, 2017.

=== Tampa Bay Buccaneers ===
On March 16, 2018, Unrein signed a three-year, $10.5 million contract with the Tampa Bay Buccaneers. He was placed on injured reserve on September 3, 2018, with a concussion.

On March 13, 2019, Unrein was released by the Buccaneers.

== NFL career statistics ==
Legend
**Bold**	Career high

=== Regular season ===
Year	Team	Games		Tackles					Interceptions					Fumbles			
Year	Team	GP	GS	Cmb	Solo	Ast	Sck	TFL	Int	Yds	TD	Lng	PD	FF	FR	Yds	TD
2011	DEN	14	0	8	6	2	0.0	0	0	0	0	0	0	0	0	0	0
2012	DEN	**16**	2	20	12	8	0.0	0	0	0	0	0	0	0	**1**	0	0
2013	DEN	**16**	1	20	15	5	0.0	1	0	0	0	0	0	0	0	0	0
2014	DEN	8	0	1	1	0	0.0	0	0	0	0	0	0	0	0	0	0
2015	SDG	2	0	1	1	0	0.0	0	0	0	0	0	0	0	0	0	0
2015	CHI	14	4	18	15	3	1.0	1	0	0	0	0	0	0	0	0	0
2016	CHI	13	**9**	26	12	**14**	1.0	1	0	0	0	0	0	0	0	0	0
2017	CHI	12	8	**32**	**25**	7	**2.5**	**4**	0	0	0	0	0	0	0	0	0
Career		95	24	126	87	39	4.5	7	0	0	0	0	0	0	1	0	0

=== Playoffs ===
Year	Team	Games		Tackles					Interceptions					Fumbles			
Year	Team	GP	GS	Cmb	Solo	Ast	Sck	TFL	Int	Yds	TD	Lng	PD	FF	FR	Yds	TD
2011	DEN	2	0	1	0	1	0.0	0	0	0	0	0	0	0	0	0	0
2012	DEN	1	0	**3**	**1**	**2**	0.0	0	0	0	0	0	0	0	0	0	0
2013	DEN	**3**	0	2	**1**	1	0.0	**1**	0	0	0	0	0	0	0	0	0
Career		6	0	6	2	4	0.0	1	0	0	0	0	0	0	0	0	0

== Personal life ==
Unrein is married to Olympic bronze-medalist trapshooter Corey Cogdell.

He has five siblings. His older brothers Mark and Mike both played college football for the University of Northern Colorado Bears. His older sister Natalie, who also went to UNC, is a three-time All-American swimmer and still holds one of the top-10 records for the 100-meter backstroke in UNC history. He is also a distant cousin of former NFL defensive end Terry Unrein, who was selected in the third round of the 1986 NFL draft by the San Diego Chargers.
