= 2012 Denver Broncos season =

American football team season

- Owner: Pat Bowlen
- General manager: John Elway
- President: Joe Ellis
- Head coach: John Fox
- Offensive coordinator: Mike McCoy
- Defensive coordinator: Jack Del Rio
- Home stadium: Sports Authority Field at Mile High

Results
- Record: 13–3
- Division place: 1st AFC West
- Playoffs: Lost Divisional Playoffs (vs. Ravens) 35–38 (2OT)
- All-Pros: 4: QB Peyton Manning; LB Von Miller; OT Ryan Clady; CB Champ Bailey
- Pro Bowlers: 7: QB Peyton Manning; LB Von Miller; CB Champ Bailey; OT Ryan Clady; DE Elvis Dumervil; OG Zane Beadles; WR Demaryius Thomas

Uniform
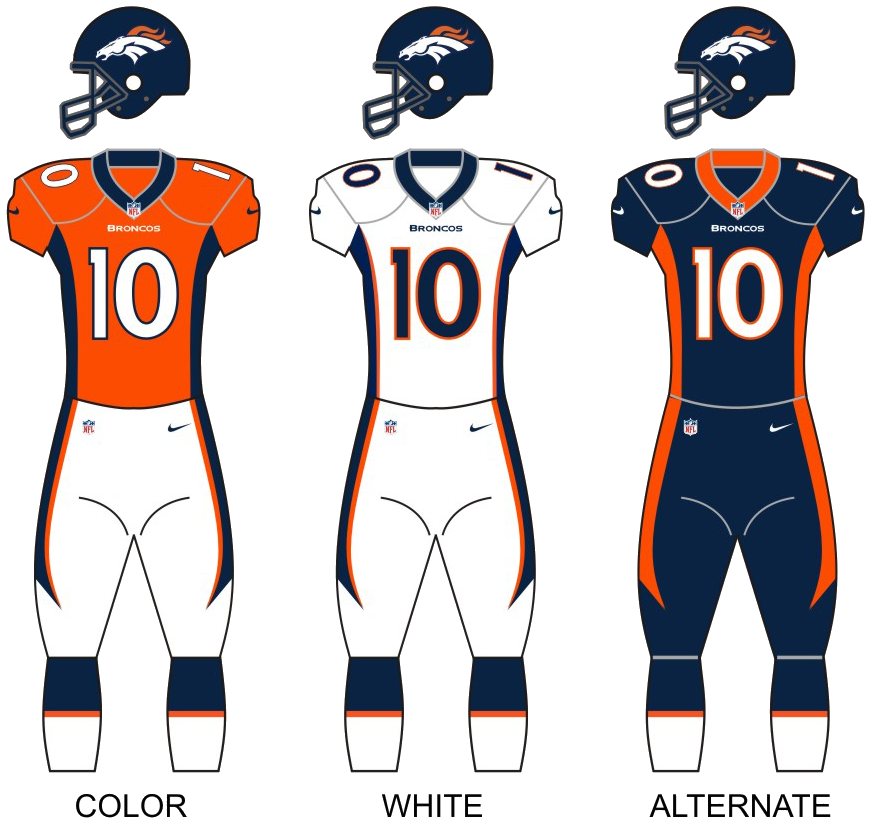

The 2012 season was the Denver Broncos' 43rd in the National Football League (NFL), their 53rd overall and their second under head coach John Fox. The offseason was marked by the signing of former Indianapolis Colts' quarterback Peyton Manning on March 20, leading to the team trading incumbent quarterback Tim Tebow to the New York Jets. The Broncos did not have a first-round selection in the 2012 NFL draft, and selected defensive end Derek Wolfe as the team's first pick in the second round of the draft.

After a 2–3 start to the season, the Broncos finished the regular season on an eleven-game winning streak, and with a record of 13–3, the team exceeded their win total from the previous two seasons combined. The Broncos won their second consecutive AFC West division title, sweeping their division, as well as earning a first-round bye for the first time since 2005 and homefield advantage throughout the playoffs for the first time since 1998, but lost to the eventual Super Bowl champion Baltimore Ravens in the Divisional round by a double-overtime score of 38–35.

During the season, Manning set numerous individual, franchise and league records, including 300-yard passing games and game-winning drives in the fourth quarter or overtime. Second-year linebacker Von Miller also set a franchise record for sacks at 18.5.

== Coaching and front-office changes ==
- January 17: Matt Russell, who served as the team's director of college scouting during the past three seasons, was promoted to director of player personnel. That same day, the Broncos announced that Rich Tuten, the team's strength and conditioning coach since 1995, will not return for the 2012 season.
- January 24: Defensive coordinator Dennis Allen was hired as the new head coach of the Oakland Raiders.
- January 27: The Broncos hired former Jacksonville Jaguars' head coach Jack Del Rio as the team's new defensive coordinator, replacing Dennis Allen. Del Rio previously worked in the same capacity on John Fox's staff with the Carolina Panthers in 2002. Also on January 27, the Broncos hired Luke Richesson as the team's new strength and conditioning coach, replacing Rich Tuten.
- February 3: The Broncos hired Mike Sullivan as the team's new director of football administration, replacing Mike Bluem.
- May 7: The Broncos parted ways with general manager Brian Xanders after four seasons. The team never did announce a replacement.
- May 14: Wayne Nunnely, who served as the team's defensive line coach during the past three seasons, retired. His position was filled by Jay Rodgers, who served as a coaching assistant during the past three seasons.
- May 29: Cory Undlin was hired as the new defensive quality control coach – a position previously held by Jay Rodgers. Undlin previously worked on Jack Del Rio's staff with the Jacksonville Jaguars for the previous three seasons.

== Roster changes ==
=== Free agents ===
Position	Player	Tag	2012 Team	Notes
RB	Lance Ball	ERFA	Denver Broncos	assigned tender on March 13, re-signed March 20
LS	David Binn	UFA	None	
DT	Brodrick Bunkley	UFA	New Orleans Saints	signed with the Saints on March 21
OT	Chris Clark	ERFA	Denver Broncos	assigned tender on March 13, re-signed April 6
P	Britton Colquitt	ERFA	Denver Broncos	assigned tender on March 13, re-signed April 4
S	Brian Dawkins	UFA	None	retired on April 23
TE	Daniel Fells	UFA	None	
LB	Mario Haggan	UFA	St. Louis Rams	signed with the Rams on May 15
DE	Derrick Harvey	UFA	None	
C	Russ Hochstein	UFA	Kansas City Chiefs	signed with the Chiefs on September 26
DE	Jason Hunter	UFA	None	re-signed March 29, placed on injured reserve August 27
FB	Spencer Larsen	UFA	None	
DT	Ryan McBean	RFA	Baltimore Ravens	assigned tender on March 13, tender rescinded April 16, signed with the Ravens on May 7
LB	Joe Mays	UFA	Denver Broncos	re-signed March 18, placed on injured reserve October 30
PK	Matt Prater	FT	Denver Broncos	assigned franchise tag on March 5, signed 4-year contract on July 2
QB	Brady Quinn	UFA	Kansas City Chiefs	signed with the Chiefs on March 18
G	Manny Ramirez	UFA	Denver Broncos	re-signed March 22
TE	Dante Rosario	UFA	San Diego Chargers	signed with the Chargers on March 21
WR	Eddie Royal	UFA	San Diego Chargers	signed with the Chargers on March 15
DT	Marcus Thomas	UFA	None	
CB	Jonathan Wilhite	UFA	None	
WR	Matthew Willis	RFA	Denver Broncos	assigned tender on March 13, re-signed April 16
LB	Wesley Woodyard	UFA	Denver Broncos	re-signed March 22

=== Signings ===
Position	Player	2011 team	Notes
S	Mike Adams	Cleveland Browns	signed March 15, on final roster
DT	Justin Bannan	St. Louis Rams	signed April 11, on final roster
LB	Keith Brooking	Dallas Cowboys	signed August 6, on final roster
WR	Andre Caldwell	Cincinnati Bengals	signed March 22, on final roster
G	C. J. Davis	Carolina Panthers	signed February 15, waived September 11, assigned to the practice squad on September 13 promoted to active roster September 18, on final roster
TE	Joel Dreessen	Houston Texans	signed March 23, on final roster
CB	Drayton Florence	Buffalo Bills	signed May 10, released August 31
QB	Caleb Hanie	Chicago Bears	signed March 24, released September 8, re-signed September 11, on final roster
RB	Jacob Hester	San Diego Chargers	signed November 26, on final roster
WR	Jason Hill	Jacksonville Jaguars	signed February 15, released August 31
WR/RS	Trindon Holliday	Houston Texans	claimed off waivers from the Texans on October 11, on final roster
WR	Cameron Kenney	Seattle Seahawks	signed August 1, waived August 27
C	Dan Koppen	New England Patriots	signed September 11, on final roster
S	Jim Leonhard	New York Jets	signed August 4, on final roster
QB	Peyton Manning	Indianapolis Colts	claimed off waivers and signed to a five-year contract on March 20, on final roster
LB	Mike Mohamed	Practice squad player	promoted to the active roster on September 29, waived October 1
CB	Tracy Porter	New Orleans Saints	signed March 22, on final roster
DT	Sealver Siliga	Practice squad player	promoted to the active roster on September 8, on final roster
WR	Brandon Stokley	New York Giants	signed April 16, on final roster
TE	Jacob Tamme	Indianapolis Colts	signed March 23, on final roster

Indicates that the player was a free agent at the end of his respective team's 2011 season.

=== Signing of Peyton Manning ===
On March 20, 2012, the Broncos reached an agreement with former Indianapolis Colts' quarterback Peyton Manning on a five-year, $96 million contract. Manning missed the entire 2011 season following multiple neck surgeries, and was released by the Colts two weeks earlier on March 7, one day before the Colts were due to pay him a $28 million roster bonus. The Seattle Seahawks, Arizona Cardinals, Miami Dolphins, San Francisco 49ers and Tennessee Titans were also mentioned as possible destinations for the former long-time Colts quarterback; however, Manning informed Broncos' personnel to begin contract negotiations with the team on March 19, and he was introduced as the Broncos' new quarterback in a press conference at the team's headquarters in Dove Valley the following day.

The language of the contract contained the following conditions: Manning did not suffer a setback in his recovery from neck surgery prior to the end of the 2012 season; therefore, the Broncos owed Manning $18 million for the 2012 season. Manning passed a physical exam at the beginning of the 2013 league year, and the Broncos owed Manning $40 million through the 2014 season. The fourth (and eventual final) year of the contract – $19 million for 2015 – was dependent on Manning passing a physical exam. Manning retired on March 7, 2016, one month after the Broncos won Super Bowl 50.

=== Departures ===
Position	Player	Notes
CB	André Goodman	released April 13
LB	Brian Iwuh	retired April 17
LS	Lonie Paxton	released August 27

=== Trades ===
- On March 21, one day after the signing of Peyton Manning, the Broncos were involved in a trade that sent quarterback Tim Tebow to the New York Jets – see draft section below.
- On May 23, cornerback Cassius Vaughn was traded to the Indianapolis Colts in exchange for fullback Chris Gronkowski.

=== Draft ===
2012 Denver Broncos Draft
Round	Selection	Player	Position	College	Notes	Trades
1	None					(Note: The Broncos traded their original first-round selection (No. 25) to the New England Patriots in exchange for the Patriots' first- and fourth-round selections – Nos. 31 and 126. The Broncos later traded both selections to the Tampa Bay Buccaneers in exchange for the Buccaneers' second- and fourth-round selections (Nos. 36 and 101).)
2	36	Derek Wolfe	DT	Cincinnati	signed May 21	(Note: The Broncos traded their original first-round selection (No. 25) to the New England Patriots in exchange for the Patriots' first- and fourth-round selections – Nos. 31 and 126. The Broncos later traded both selections to the Tampa Bay Buccaneers in exchange for the Buccaneers' second- and fourth-round selections (Nos. 36 and 101).)
2	57	Brock Osweiler	QB	Arizona State	signed July 24	
3	67	Ronnie Hillman	RB	San Diego State	signed July 24	(Note: The Broncos traded their original third- and fourth-round selections (Nos. 87 and 120) to the Cleveland Browns in exchange for the Browns' third-round selection (No. 67).) (Note: See draft note 1.) (Note: The Broncos traded quarterback Tim Tebow and their seventh-round selection (No. 232) to the New York Jets in exchange for the Jets' fourth- and sixth-round selections (Nos. 108 and 188).)
4	101	Omar Bolden	CB	Arizona State	signed May 17	(Note: The Broncos traded their original third- and fourth-round selections (Nos. 87 and 120) to the Cleveland Browns in exchange for the Browns' third-round selection (No. 67).) (Note: See draft note 1.) (Note: The Broncos traded quarterback Tim Tebow and their seventh-round selection (No. 232) to the New York Jets in exchange for the Jets' fourth- and sixth-round selections (Nos. 108 and 188).)
4	108	Philip Blake	C	Baylor	signed June 1, placed on injured reserve September 18	(Note: The Broncos traded their original third- and fourth-round selections (Nos. 87 and 120) to the Cleveland Browns in exchange for the Browns' third-round selection (No. 67).) (Note: See draft note 1.) (Note: The Broncos traded quarterback Tim Tebow and their seventh-round selection (No. 232) to the New York Jets in exchange for the Jets' fourth- and sixth-round selections (Nos. 108 and 188).)
5	137	Malik Jackson	DE	Tennessee	signed May 18	(Note: The Broncos traded their original fifth-round selection (No. 160) and a 2011 sixth-round selection to the Cleveland Browns in exchange for quarterback Brady Quinn.) (Note: The Broncos acquired this fifth-round selection (No. 137) in a trade that sent wide receiver Brandon Lloyd to the St. Louis Rams. The Rams originally sent a sixth-round selection to the Broncos in October 2011, however, the selection was later upgraded to a fifth-rounder after a condition was met in which Lloyd made a minimum of 30 receptions with the Rams during the 2011 season.)
6	188	Danny Trevathan	LB	Kentucky	signed May 22	(Note: The Broncos traded their original sixth-round selection (No. 194) to the Philadelphia Eagles in exchange for linebacker Joe Mays. The Broncos originally traded running back J. J. Arrington to the Eagles in July 2010, with the condition that if Arrington did not make the Eagles' 53-man roster at the start of the 2010 season, the Broncos would instead send a 2012 sixth-round selection to the Eagles (Arrington was indeed released by the Eagles shortly before the 2010 season).) (Note: See draft note 4.)
7	None					

Draft trades

=== Undrafted free agents ===
All undrafted free agents were signed just after the 2012 NFL draft concluded on April 28, unless noted otherwise.

2012 Denver Broncos undrafted free agents
Player	Position	College	Notes
DE	Jamie Blatnick	Oklahoma State	waived August 31, assigned to practice squad September 11, released from practice squad October 13
LS	Aaron Brewer	San Diego State	on final roster
LB	Elliot Coffey	Baylor	waived August 27
LB	Jerry Franklin	Arkansas	waived August 31
S	Duke Ihenacho	San Jose State	waived August 31, assigned to practice squad September 1, promoted to active roster September 29, waived October 11, assigned to practice squad October 13, promoted to active roster October 30, waived November 13
LB	Steven Johnson	Kansas	on final roster
CB	Coryell Judie	Texas A&M	waived July 25
TE	Anthony Miller	California	waived August 27
WR	Eric Page	Toledo	waived July 25
OT	Mike Remmers	Oregon State	waived August 27
S	Anthony Perkins	Colorado	signed July 28, waived August 27
WR	Gerell Robinson	Arizona State	waived August 31
G	Wayne Tribue	Temple	waived August 31, assigned to practice squad September 1, released from practice squad September 11
G	Austin Wuebbels	Missouri	waived August 27

=== Suspensions ===
- March 9: Linebacker D. J. Williams, defensive tackle Ryan McBean and tight end Virgil Green were each suspended by the NFL for violating the league's policy on performance-enhancing substances. Williams and McBean were each suspended for the first six games of the 2012 season, while Green was given a four-game suspension. Williams and McBean each challenged the suspensions and took legal action against the NFL. McBean later signed with the Baltimore Ravens on May 7, three weeks after his restricted free agent tender was rescinded by the Broncos. On August 27, a federal appeals court upheld Williams' suspension, and on October 5, Williams was suspended for an additional three games by the NFL following his August conviction for a driving under the influence arrest in November 2010. Green was reinstated to the active roster on October 1, while Williams was reinstated to the active roster on November 17, the latter in time for the team's Week 11 game vs. the San Diego Chargers.
- September 25: Linebacker Joe Mays was suspended one game and fined $50,000 by the NFL for a helmet-to-helmet hit on Houston Texans' quarterback Matt Schaub, during the Broncos' 31–25 loss to the Texans two days earlier (September 23). Schaub had his helmet knocked off, and suffered a laceration on his earlobe as a result of the hit. Mays missed the Broncos' Week 4 game against the Oakland Raiders, and had been considered a repeat offender, following a $7,875 fine for a hit on Atlanta Falcons' quarterback Matt Ryan in Week 2.

=== Injuries ===
- August 4: Running back Mario Fannin suffered a ruptured Achilles tendon during training camp, and was placed on injured reserve. Fannin missed the entire 2011 season following a knee injury during the preseason last year.
- August 14: Guard Chris Kuper suffered a broken forearm during practice. He not only missed the remainder of the preseason, but also missed the first five games of the regular season. Also on August 14, defensive end Jason Hunter suffered torn triceps, and was initially expected to miss at least two months, but was placed on injured reserve on August 27.
- September 11: Defensive tackle Ty Warren was placed on injured reserve, after suffering torn triceps for a second consecutive season.
- September 18: Rookie guard/center Philip Blake was placed on injured reserve.
- September 29: Safety Quinton Carter was placed on injured reserve due to knee surgery.
- October 1: Center J. D. Walton was placed on injured reserve, after suffering a dislocated ankle during the team's Week 4 win over the Oakland Raiders the previous day.
- October 30: Linebacker Joe Mays was placed on injured reserve, after he suffered a fractured fibula during the team's Week 8 win over the New Orleans Saints two days earlier.
- November 21: Running back Willis McGahee was placed on the injured reserve/designated for return list, two days after suffering a ruptured MCL and compression fracture in his right knee, during the team's Week 11 win over the San Diego Chargers. Under NFL rules, McGahee became eligible to return to practice on January 2, 2013 – three days after the regular season finale, and would have been eligible to return for the AFC championship game on January 20, had the Broncos made it that far into the postseason.
- Cornerback Tracy Porter missed more than half of the season, after experiencing aftereffects from a seizure that he suffered during the preseason. Porter began experiencing symptoms prior to the team's Week 6 game against the San Diego Chargers, and returned to practice on a limited basis over the next several weeks. Porter returned to game action against the Cleveland Browns in Week 16, only to suffer a concussion and miss the Week 17 regular season finale and the playoffs.

== Staff ==
2012 Denver Broncos staff
Front office: Owner/chairman/CEO – Pat Bowlen; President – Joe Ellis; Executive vice president of football operations – John Elway; Director of football administration – Mike Sullivan; Director of player personnel – Matt Russell; Director of pro personnel – Keith Kidd; Assistant director of college scouting – Lenny McGill; Assistant director of pro personnel – Champ Kelly; Director of player development – Jerry Butler; Head coaches: Head coach – John Fox; Offensive coaches: Offensive coordinator – Mike McCoy; Quarterbacks – Adam Gase; Running backs – Eric Studesville; Wide receivers – Tyke Tolbert; Tight ends – Clancy Barone; Offensive line – Dave Magazu; Offensive quality control – Brian Callahan	Defensive coaches: Defensive coordinator – Jack Del Rio; Defensive line – Jay Rodgers; Linebackers – Richard Smith; Secondary – Ron Milus; Assistant secondary – Sam Garnes; Defensive quality control – Cory Undlin; Special teams coaches: Special teams coordinator – Jeff Rodgers; Assistant special teams – Keith Burns; Strength and conditioning: Strength and conditioning – Luke Richesson; Assistant strength and conditioning – Mike Eubanks; Assistant strength and conditioning – Jason George; Assistant strength and conditioning – Anthony Lomando

== Final roster ==
2012 Denver Broncos roster
Quarterbacks (QB): 16 Caleb Hanie; 18 Peyton Manning; 6 Brock Osweiler; Running backs (RB): 35 Lance Ball; 49 Chris Gronkowski FB; 40 Jacob Hester FB; 21 Ronnie Hillman; 27 Knowshon Moreno; Wide receivers (WR): 17 Andre Caldwell; 87 Eric Decker; 11 Trindon Holliday RS; 14 Brandon Stokley; 88 Demaryius Thomas; 12 Matt Willis; Tight ends (TE): 81 Joel Dreessen; 85 Virgil Green; 84 Jacob Tamme; 80 Julius Thomas	Offensive linemen (OL): 68 Zane Beadles G; 78 Ryan Clady T; 75 Chris Clark T; 54 C. J. Davis C; 74 Orlando Franklin T; 67 Dan Koppen C; 73 Chris Kuper G; 65 Manny Ramirez G; Defensive linemen (DL): 91 Robert Ayers DE; 97 Justin Bannan NT; 92 Elvis Dumervil DE; 70 Malik Jackson DE; 98 Sealver Siliga NT; 96 Mitch Unrein NT; 99 Kevin Vickerson NT; 95 Derek Wolfe DE	Linebackers (LB): 57 Keith Brooking ILB; 56 Nate Irving OLB; 53 Steven Johnson ILB; 58 Von Miller OLB; 59 Danny Trevathan OLB; 55 D. J. Williams ILB; 52 Wesley Woodyard OLB; Defensive backs (DB): 20 Mike Adams SS; 24 Champ Bailey CB; 31 Omar Bolden CB; 30 David Bruton SS; 32 Tony Carter CB; 25 Chris Harris Jr. CB; 36 Jim Leonhard FS; 26 Rahim Moore FS; 22 Tracy Porter CB; Special teams (ST): 46 Aaron Brewer LS; 4 Britton Colquitt P; 5 Matt Prater K	Practice squad: 29 Mario Butler CB; 71 Paul Cornick T; 79 Lonnie Edwards G; 63 Ben Garland G; 34 Blake Gideon S; 33 Duke Ihenacho S; 37 Jeremiah Johnson RB; 89 Greg Orton WR; 60 Quentin Saulsberry C (Susp.); Reserve: 93 Jeremy Beal DE (IR); 64 Philip Blake C (IR); 28 Quinton Carter S (IR); 42 Mario Fannin RB (IR); 90 Jason Hunter DE (IR); 23 Willis McGahee RB (IR); 51 Joe Mays ILB (IR); 50 J. D. Walton C (IR); 94 Ty Warren DT (IR); Rookies in italics 53 active, 10 reserve, 8 practice squad

== Preseason ==
Week	Date	Opponent	Result	Record	Venue	Recap
1	August 9	at Chicago Bears	W 31–3	1–0	Soldier Field	Recap
2	August 18	Seattle Seahawks	L 10–30	1–1	Sports Authority Field at Mile High	Recap
3	August 26	San Francisco 49ers	L 24–29	1–2	Sports Authority Field at Mile High	Recap
4	August 30	at Arizona Cardinals	W 16–13	2–2	University of Phoenix Stadium	Recap

== Regular season ==
=== Schedule ===
Week	Date	Opponent	Result	Record	Venue	Recap
1	September 9	Pittsburgh Steelers	**W** 31–19	1–0	Sports Authority Field at Mile High	Recap
2	September 17	at Atlanta Falcons	**L** 21–27	1–1	Georgia Dome	Recap
3	September 23	Houston Texans	**L** 25–31	1–2	Sports Authority Field at Mile High	Recap
4	September 30	**Oakland Raiders**	**W** 37–6	2–2	Sports Authority Field at Mile High	Recap
5	October 7	at New England Patriots	**L** 21–31	2–3	Gillette Stadium	Recap
6	October 15	at **San Diego Chargers**	**W** 35–24	3–3	Qualcomm Stadium	Recap
7	Bye					
8	October 28	New Orleans Saints	**W** 34–14	4–3	Sports Authority Field at Mile High	Recap
9	November 4	at Cincinnati Bengals	**W** 31–23	5–3	Paul Brown Stadium	Recap
10	November 11	at Carolina Panthers	**W** 36–14	6–3	Bank of America Stadium	Recap
11	November 18	**San Diego Chargers**	**W** 30–23	7–3	Sports Authority Field at Mile High	Recap
12	November 25	at **Kansas City Chiefs**	**W** 17–9	8–3	Arrowhead Stadium	Recap
13	December 2	Tampa Bay Buccaneers	**W** 31–23	9–3	Sports Authority Field at Mile High	Recap
14	December 6	at **Oakland Raiders**	**W** 26–13	10–3	O.co Coliseum	Recap
15	December 16	at Baltimore Ravens	**W** 34–17	11–3	M&T Bank Stadium	Recap
16	December 23	Cleveland Browns	**W** 34–12	12–3	Sports Authority Field at Mile High	Recap
17	December 30	**Kansas City Chiefs**	**W** 38–3	13–3	Sports Authority Field at Mile High	Recap

Note: Intra-division opponents are in bold text.

=== Game summaries ===
==== Week 1: vs. Pittsburgh Steelers ====
Week One: Pittsburgh Steelers at Denver Broncos – Game summary

Quarter	1	2	3	4	Total
Steelers	0	10	3	6	**19**
**Broncos**	0	7	7	17	**31**

at Sports Authority Field at Mile High, Denver, Colorado

- Date: September 9
- Game time: 6:20 p.m. MDT
- Game weather: 85 °F (29 °C), sunny
- Game attendance: 76,823
- Referee: Gerald Wright (Note: Replacement officials were used from Weeks 1–3 due to the 2012 referee labor dispute.)
- TV announcers (NBC): Al Michaels, Cris Collinsworth and Michele Tafoya
- Recap, Gamebook

Game information

**First quarter**

- No scoring plays

**Second quarter**

- PIT – 10:10 Shaun Suisham 21-yard FG. Drive: 10 plays, 35 yards, 4:50. (PIT 3–0)
- DEN – 5:16 Knowshon Moreno 7-yard TD run, Matt Prater kick. Drive: 12 plays, 80 yards, 4:54. (DEN 7–3)
- PIT – 0:28 Heath Miller 4-yard TD pass from Ben Roethlisberger, Shaun Suisham kick. Drive: 14 plays, 79 yards, 4:48. (PIT 10–7)

**Third quarter**

- PIT – 6:05 Shaun Suisham 35-yard FG. Drive: 16 plays, 64 yards, 8:55. (PIT 13–7)
- DEN – 5:29 Demaryius Thomas 71-yard TD pass from Peyton Manning, Matt Prater kick. Drive: 2 plays, 80 yards, 0:36. (DEN 14–13)

**Fourth quarter**

- PIT – 14:11 Mike Wallace 3-yard TD pass from Ben Roethlisberger, two-point pass failed. Drive: 14 plays, 80 yards, 6:18. (PIT 19–14)
- DEN – 9:23 Jacob Tamme 1-yard TD pass from Peyton Manning, Willis McGahee received pass from Peyton Manning for a two-point conversion. Drive: 10 plays, 80 yards, 4:48. (DEN 22–19)
- DEN – 3:00 Matt Prater 26-yard FG. Drive: 12 plays, 55 yards, 5:18. (DEN 25–19)
- DEN – 1:58 Tracy Porter 43-yard interception return for a TD, two-point run failed. **(DEN 31–19)**

**Top passers**

- PIT – Ben Roethlisberger: 22/40, 245 yards, 2 TD, 1 INT
- DEN – Peyton Manning: 19/26, 253 yards, 2 TD

**Top rushers**

- PIT – Jonathan Dwyer: 9 rushes, 43 yards
- DEN – Willis McGahee: 16 rushes, 64 yards

**Top receivers**

- PIT – Antonio Brown: 4 receptions, 74 yards
- DEN – Demaryius Thomas: 5 receptions, 110 yards

**Top tacklers**

- PIT – Larry Foote: 8 tackles, 1 assist, 1 sack
- DEN – Wesley Woodyard: 12 tackles, 1 sack

The Broncos kicked off their 2012 season at home against the Pittsburgh Steelers on Sunday Night Football, in a rematch of their 2011 Wild Card playoff game. After a scoreless first quarter, the Steelers grabbed the lead, with a 21-yard field goal by placekicker Shaun Suisham. The Broncos responded, with running back Knowshon Moreno rushing for a 7-yard touchdown, but the Steelers countered, with a 4-yard touchdown pass from quarterback Ben Roethlisberger to tight end Heath Miller just before halftime. In the third quarter, the Steelers added to their lead, with a 35-yard field goal by Suisham. The Broncos grabbed the lead, when quarterback Peyton Manning threw his 400th career touchdown pass—a 71-yarder to wide receiver Demaryius Thomas, but the Steelers responded early in the fourth quarter, when Roethlisberger threw a 3-yard touchdown pass to wide receiver Mike Wallace (with a failed two-point conversion attempt). With 9:23 remaining in the fourth quarter, the Broncos claimed the lead for good, when Manning threw a 1-yard touchdown pass to tight end Jacob Tamme (coupled with running back Willis McGahee receiving a pass from Manning for a two-point conversion), then added to their lead with a 26-yard field goal by placekicker Matt Prater, followed by cornerback Tracy Porter returning an interception off Roethlisberger 43 yards for a touchdown (with a failed two-point conversion attempt).

==== Week 2: at Atlanta Falcons ====
Week Two: Denver Broncos at Atlanta Falcons – Game summary

Quarter	1	2	3	4	Total
Broncos	0	7	0	14	**21**
**Falcons**	10	10	7	0	**27**

at Georgia Dome, Atlanta, Georgia

- Date: September 17
- Game time: 8:30 p.m. EDT/6:30 pm. MDT
- Game weather: Played indoors (dome stadium)
- Game attendance: 70,427
- Referee: Ken Roan
- TV announcers (ESPN): Mike Tirico, Jon Gruden and Lisa Salters
- Recap, Gamebook

Game information

**First quarter**

- ATL – 13:20 Michael Turner 1-yard TD run, Matt Bryant kick. Drive: 3 plays, 1 yard, 0:53. (ATL 7–0)
- ATL – 9:46 Matt Bryant 37-yard FG. Drive: 6 plays, 24 yards, 2:04. (ATL 10–0)

**Second quarter**

- ATL – 10:05 Matt Bryant 42-yard FG. Drive: 11 plays, 59 yards, 4:57. (ATL 13–0)
- ATL – 4:39 Tony Gonzalez 1-yard TD pass from Matt Ryan, Matt Bryant kick. Drive: 7 plays, 73 yards, 4:04. (ATL 20–0)
- DEN – 0:06 Demaryius Thomas 17-yard TD pass from Peyton Manning, Matt Prater kick. Drive: 13 plays, 80 yards, 4:33. (ATL 20–7)

**Third quarter**

- ATL – 7:08 Roddy White 4-yard TD pass from Matt Ryan, Matt Bryant kick. Drive: 6 plays, 64 yards, 3:17. (ATL 27–7)

**Fourth quarter**

- DEN – 11:48 Willis McGahee 2-yard TD run, Matt Prater kick. Drive: 12 plays, 88 yards, 5:02. (ATL 27–14)
- DEN – 3:25 Willis McGahee 2-yard TD run, Matt Prater kick. Drive: 9 plays, 45 yards, 2:48. **(ATL 27–21)**

**Top passers**

- DEN – Peyton Manning: 24/37, 241 yards, 1 TD, 3 INT
- ATL – Matt Ryan: 24/36, 219 yards, 2 TD

**Top rushers**

- DEN – Willis McGahee: 22 rushes, 113 yards, 2 TD
- ATL – Michael Turner: 17 rushes, 42 yards, 1 TD

**Top receivers**

- DEN – Demaryius Thomas: 8 receptions, 78 yards, 1 TD
- ATL – Roddy White: 8 receptions, 102 yards, 1 TD

**Top tacklers**

- DEN – Mike Adams: 4 tackles, 4 assists
- ATL – Sean Weatherspoon: 5 tackles, 5 assists

Following their season-opening win over the Steelers, the Broncos traveled to the Georgia Dome to face the Atlanta Falcons on Monday Night Football. The Falcons converted three first quarter Peyton Manning interceptions into an eventual 20–0 lead, with a 1-yard touchdown run by running back Michael Turner, followed by field goals of 37 and 42 yards by placekicker Matt Bryant—the latter in the second quarter—and a 1-yard touchdown pass from quarterback Matt Ryan to tight end Tony Gonzalez. The Broncos got on the scoreboard just before halftime, with quarterback Peyton Manning throwing a 17-yard touchdown pass to wide receiver Demaryius Thomas. The Falcons responded in the third quarter, with a 4-yard touchdown pass from Ryan to wide receiver Roddy White. The Broncos tried to rally in the fourth quarter, with running back Willis McGahee rushing for a pair of 2-yard touchdowns. However, the Falcons would run out the clock.

==== Week 3: vs. Houston Texans ====
Week Three: Houston Texans at Denver Broncos – Game summary

Quarter	1	2	3	4	Total
**Texans**	7	14	10	0	**31**
Broncos	5	6	0	14	**25**

at Sports Authority Field at Mile High, Denver, Colorado

- Date: September 23
- Game time: 2:25 pm. MDT
- Game weather: 84 °F (29 °C), partly sunny
- Game attendance: 76,566
- Referee: Jerry Frump
- TV announcers (CBS): Jim Nantz and Phil Simms
- Recap, Gamebook

Game information

**First quarter**

- DEN – 13:20 Elvis Dumervil sacked Matt Schaub in the end zone for a safety. (DEN 2–0)
- DEN – 8:41 Matt Prater 32-yard FG. Drive: 10 plays, 46 yards, 4:39. (DEN 5–0)
- HOU – 6:28 Andre Johnson 60-yard TD pass from Matt Schaub, Shayne Graham kick. Drive: 3 plays, 80 yards, 2:13. (HOU 7–5)

**Second quarter**

- HOU – 10:47 Arian Foster 3-yard TD pass from Matt Schaub, Shayne Graham kick. Drive: 14 plays, 97 yards, 7:11. (HOU 14–5)
- HOU – 8:54 Kevin Walter 52-yard TD pass from Matt Schaub, Shayne Graham kick. Drive: 2 plays, 57 yards, 0:46. (HOU 21–5)
- DEN – 5:44 Matt Prater 23-yard FG. Drive: 9 plays, 75 yards, 3:10. (HOU 21–8)
- DEN – 0:01 Matt Prater 53-yard FG. Drive: 5 plays, 25 yards, 0:33. (HOU 21–11)

**Third quarter**

- HOU – 9:11 Shayne Graham 41-yard FG. Drive: 7 plays, 39 yards, 3:45. (HOU 24–11)
- HOU – 1:33 Owen Daniels 14-yard TD pass from Matt Schaub, Shayne Graham kick. Drive: 5 plays, 72 yards, 2:19. (HOU 31–11)

**Fourth quarter**

- DEN – 9:49 Brandon Stokley 38-yard TD pass from Peyton Manning, Matt Prater kick. Drive: 2 plays, 49 yards, 0:31. (HOU 31–18)
- DEN – 3:00 Joel Dreessen 6-yard TD pass from Peyton Manning, Matt Prater kick. Drive: 16 plays, 74 yards, 5:08. **(HOU 31–25)**

**Top passers**

- HOU – Matt Schaub: 17/30, 290 yards, 4 TD, 1 INT
- DEN – Peyton Manning: 26/52, 330 yards, 2 TD

**Top rushers**

- HOU – Arian Foster: 25 rushes, 105 yards
- DEN – Willis McGahee: 12 rushes, 36 yards

**Top receivers**

- HOU – Kevin Walter: 3 receptions, 73 yards, 1 TD
- DEN – Eric Decker: 8 receptions, 136 yards

**Top tacklers**

- HOU – Kareem Jackson: 7 tackles, 1 assist
- DEN – Rahim Moore: 9 tackles

Hoping to rebound from their Monday Night loss in Atlanta, the Broncos returned home for an AFC duel with the Houston Texans. The Broncos jumped out to a 5–0 lead in the first quarter, with defensive end Elvis Dumervil sacking Texans' quarterback Matt Schaub in the end zone for a safety, followed by a 32-yard field goal placekicker Matt Prater. However, the Texans would reel off 21 unanswered points, with Schaub throwing three touchdown passes—a 60-yarder to wide receiver Andre Johnson, followed in the second quarter by a 3-yarder to running back Arian Foster and a 52-yarder to wide receiver Kevin Walter. The Broncos narrowed the Texans' lead to 21–11 at halftime, with a pair of field goals by Prater—from 23 and 53 yards. The Texans increased their lead in the third quarter, with a 41-yard field goal by placekicker Shayne Graham, followed by a 14-yard touchdown pass from Schaub to tight end Owen Daniels. Trailing 31–11 with 10:20 remaining in the fourth quarter, the Broncos tried to rally, with quarterback Peyton Manning throwing a pair of touchdown passes—a 38-yarder to wide receiver Brandon Stokley and a 6-yarder to tight end Joel Dreessen to narrow Houston's lead to 31–25 with three minutes remaining. After forcing a Texans' punt, the Broncos got the football back with 20 seconds remaining, but the Texans' defense stood their ground.

Notes

Former wide receiver Rod Smith, who played with the Broncos from 1994 to 2007, was inducted into the Broncos Ring of Fame during halftime. Smith is the Broncos' franchise leader in receptions, receiving yards and touchdowns.

==== Week 4: vs. Oakland Raiders ====
Week Four: Oakland Raiders at Denver Broncos – Game summary

Quarter	1	2	3	4	Total
Raiders	3	3	0	0	**6**
**Broncos**	10	0	21	6	**37**

at Sports Authority Field at Mile High, Denver, Colorado

- Date: September 30
- Game time: 2:05 pm. MDT
- Game weather: 72 °F (22 °C), mostly sunny
- Game attendance: 76,787
- Referee: Pete Morelli
- TV announcers (CBS): Jim Nantz and Phil Simms
- Recap, Gamebook

Game information

**First quarter**

- DEN – 10:32 Joel Dreessen 22-yard TD pass from Peyton Manning, Matt Prater kick. Drive: 11 plays, 80 yards, 4:28. (DEN 7–0)
- OAK – 6:47 Sebastian Janikowski 38-yard FG. Drive: 9 plays, 60 yards, 3:45. (DEN 7–3)
- DEN – 0:00 Matt Prater 21-yard FG. Drive: 13 plays, 77 yards, 6:47. (DEN 10–3)

**Second quarter**

- OAK – 0:22 Sebastian Janikowski 24-yard FG. Drive: 9 plays, 58 yards, 2:52. (DEN 10–6)

**Third quarter**

- DEN – 10:08 Eric Decker 17-yard TD pass from Peyton Manning, Matt Prater kick. Drive: 9 plays, 79 yards, 3:51. (DEN 17–6)
- DEN – 7:30 Willis McGahee 2-yard TD run, Matt Prater kick. Drive: 4 plays, 18 yards, 1:47. (DEN 24–6)
- DEN – 3:46 Lance Ball 14-yard TD pass from Peyton Manning, Matt Prater kick. Drive: 5 plays, 63 yards, 1:36. (DEN 31–6)

**Fourth quarter**

- DEN – 12:56 Matt Prater 43-yard FG. Drive: 11 plays, 44 yards, 4:49. (DEN 34–6)
- DEN – 3:43 Matt Prater 53-yard FG. Drive: 12 plays, 41 yards, 7:17. **(DEN 37–6)**

**Top passers**

- OAK – Carson Palmer: 19/34, 202 yards
- DEN – Peyton Manning: 30/38, 338 yards, 3 TD

**Top rushers**

- OAK – Darren McFadden: 13 rushes, 34 yards
- DEN – Willis McGahee: 19 rushes, 112 yards, 1 TD

**Top receivers**

- OAK – Denarius Moore: 4 receptions, 71 yards
- DEN – Demaryius Thomas: 5 receptions, 103 yards

**Top tacklers**

- OAK – Tyvon Branch, Matt Giordano: 8 tackles each (1 assist by Branch)
- DEN – Champ Bailey, Rahim Moore: 5 tackles each (1 assist by Moore)

Hoping to snap a two-game losing streak, the Broncos remained on home ground for an AFC West duel against the Oakland Raiders. The Broncos grabbed the early lead, with quarterback Peyton Manning throwing a 22-yard touchdown pass to tight end Joel Dreessen. The Raiders responded, with a 38-yard field goal by placekicker Sebastian Janikowski, but the Broncos countered, with a 21-yard field goal by placekicker Matt Prater at the end of the first quarter. A 24-yard field goal by Janikowski just before halftime was the only scoring play of the second quarter. The Broncos' offense exploded in the third quarter, with Manning connecting on a 17-yard touchdown pass to wide receiver Eric Decker, followed by a 2-yard touchdown run by running back Willis McGahee and a 14-yard touchdown pass from Manning to running back Lance Ball. Prater added field goals of 43 and 53 yards in the fourth quarter.

Notes

With the win, the Broncos snapped a four-game home losing streak against the Raiders.

Injuries

Center J. D. Walton suffered a dislocated ankle late in the second quarter, and was placed on the season-ending injured reserve the following day (October 1).

==== Week 5: at New England Patriots ====
Week Five: Denver Broncos at New England Patriots – Game summary

Quarter	1	2	3	4	Total
Broncos	0	7	7	7	**21**
**Patriots**	7	10	14	0	**31**

at Gillette Stadium, Foxborough, Massachusetts

- Date: October 7
- Game time: 4:25 pm. EDT/2:25 pm. MDT
- Game weather: 54 °F (12 °C), showers
- Game attendance: 68,756
- Referee: Gene Steratore
- TV announcers (CBS): Jim Nantz and Phil Simms
- Recap, Gamebook

Game information

**First quarter**

- NE – 3:08 Wes Welker 8-yard TD pass from Tom Brady, Stephen Gostkowski kick. Drive: 12 plays, 84 yards, 4:44. (NE 7–0)

**Second quarter**

- DEN – 14:05 Joel Dreessen 1-yard TD pass from Peyton Manning, Matt Prater kick. Drive: 10 plays, 80 yards, 4:03. (tied 7–7)
- NE – 7:57 Shane Vereen 1-yard TD run, Stephen Gostkowski kick. Drive: 14 plays, 80 yards, 6:08. (NE 14–7)
- NE – 0:02 Stephen Gostkowski 23-yard FG. Drive: 16 plays, 93 yards, 5:01. (NE 17–7)

**Third quarter**

- NE – 5:00 Tom Brady 1-yard TD run, Stephen Gostkowski kick. Drive: 16 plays, 80 yards, 6:24. (NE 24–7)
- NE – 4:42 Stevan Ridley 8-yard TD run, Stephen Gostkowski kick. Drive: 1 play, 14 yards, 0:09. (NE 31–7)
- DEN – 1:08 Eric Decker 2-yard TD pass from Peyton Manning, Matt Prater kick. Drive: 10 plays, 90 yards, 3:34. (NE 31–14)

**Fourth quarter**

- DEN – 6:43 Brandon Stokley 5-yard TD pass from Peyton Manning, Matt Prater kick. Drive: 6 plays, 43 yards, 1:25. **(NE 31–21)**

**Top passers**

- DEN – Peyton Manning: 31/44, 345 yards, 3 TD
- NE – Tom Brady: 23/31, 223 yards, 1 TD

**Top rushers**

- DEN – Willis McGahee: 14 rushes, 51 yards
- NE – Stevan Ridley: 28 rushes, 151 yards

**Top receivers**

- DEN – Demaryius Thomas: 9 receptions, 188 yards
- NE – Wes Welker: 13 receptions, 104 yards, 1 TD

**Top tacklers**

- DEN – Mike Adams and Rahim Moore: 6 tackles each (6 assists each)
- NE – Jerod Mayo and Tavon Wilson: 5 tackles each (8 assists by Mayo, 5 assists by Wilson)

Coming off their dominating win over the Raiders, the Broncos traveled to Foxborough, Massachusetts to face the New England Patriots at Gillette Stadium. This was the 13th meeting between quarterbacks Peyton Manning and Tom Brady since 2001. The Patriots grabbed the early lead, with Brady connecting on an 8-yard touchdown pass to wide receiver Wes Welker. The Broncos responded early in the second quarter, with Manning tossing a 1-yard touchdown pass to tight end Joel Dreessen. However, the Patriots reeled off 24 unanswered points, with running back Shane Vereen rushing for a 1-yard touchdown, a 23-yard field goal by placekicker Stephen Gostkowski just before halftime, followed in the third quarter by Brady scoring a 1-yard touchdown on a quarterback sneak and running back Stevan Ridley rushing for an 8-yard touchdown. The latter touchdown occurred after a Manning fumble deep in Broncos' territory. The Broncos responded, with Manning throwing a pair of touchdown passes – a 2-yarder to wide receiver Eric Decker, followed in the fourth quarter by a 5-yarder to wide receiver Brandon Stokley to close the gap to 31–21 with 6:43 remaining. Following a Patriots' fumble, the Broncos were attempting to rally, however, running back Willis McGahee fumbled the football at the Patriots' 14-yard line with 3:48 remaining, halting the Broncos' rally attempt. The Patriots subsequently ran out the clock.

==== Week 6: at San Diego Chargers ====
Week Six: Denver Broncos at San Diego Chargers – Game summary

Quarter	1	2	3	4	Total
**Broncos**	0	0	14	21	**35**
Chargers	10	14	0	0	**24**

at Qualcomm Stadium, San Diego, California

- Date: October 15
- Game time: 6:30 pm. MDT/5:30 p.m. PDT
- Game weather: 78 °F (26 °C), sunny
- Game attendance: 68,604
- Referee: Jeff Triplette
- TV announcers (ESPN): Mike Tirico, Jon Gruden and Lisa Salters
- Recap, Gamebook

Game information

**First quarter**

- SD – 8:59 Nick Novak 32-yard FG. Drive: 4 plays, 4 yards, 0:56. (SD 3–0)
- SD – 8:16 Antonio Gates 15-yard TD pass from Philip Rivers, Nick Novak kick. Drive: 2 plays, 19 yards, 0:40. (SD 10–0)

**Second quarter**

- SD – 6:00 Quentin Jammer 80-yard interception return for a TD, Nick Novak kick. (SD 17–0)
- SD – 0:24 Antonio Gates 11-yard TD pass from Philip Rivers, Nick Novak kick. Drive: 10 plays, 66 yards, 3:56. (SD 24–0)

**Third quarter**

- DEN – 10:56 Demaryius Thomas 29-yard TD pass from Peyton Manning, Matt Prater kick. Drive: 8 plays, 85 yards, 4:04. (SD 24–7)
- DEN – 4:41 Tony Carter 65-yard fumble return for a TD, Matt Prater kick. (SD 24–14)

**Fourth quarter**

- DEN – 13:33 Eric Decker 7-yard TD pass from Peyton Manning, Matt Prater kick. Drive: 9 plays, 55 yards, 4:14. (SD 24–21)
- DEN – 9:03 Brandon Stokley 21-yard TD pass from Peyton Manning, Matt Prater kick. Drive: 4 plays, 50 yards, 2:08. (DEN 28–24)
- DEN – 2:05 Chris Harris, Jr. 46-yard interception return for a TD, Matt Prater kick. **(DEN 35–24)**

**Top passers**

- DEN – Peyton Manning: 24/30, 309 yards, 3 TD, 1 INT
- SD – Philip Rivers: 25/41, 242 yards, 2 TD, 4 INT

**Top rushers**

- DEN – Willis McGahee: 17 rushes, 56 yards
- SD – Ryan Mathews: 22 rushes, 74 yards

**Top receivers**

- DEN – Eric Decker: 6 receptions, 98 yards, 1 TD
- SD – Antonio Gates: 6 receptions, 81 yards, 2 TD

**Top tacklers**

- DEN – Mike Adams: 7 tackles, 1 forced fumble, 1 fumble recovery
- SD – Antoine Cason, Eric Weddle and Atari Bigby: 5 tackles each (2 assists by Cason, 1 assist by Weddle and Bigby)

Hoping to rebound from their loss at New England, the Broncos traveled to Qualcomm Stadium for an AFC West duel with the San Diego Chargers on Monday Night Football. The Chargers jumped out to a 10–0 lead in the first quarter, with a 32-yard field goal by placekicker Nick Novak, followed by a 15-yard touchdown pass from quarterback Philip Rivers to tight end Antonio Gates. Both scores came off Broncos' miscues on special teams—the former occurred after Trindon Holliday muffed a punt return, while the latter occurred after Omar Bolden coughed up the football on a kickoff return. The Broncos were attempting to narrow the Chargers' lead midway through the second quarter, but wide receiver Eric Decker stumbled near the Chargers' 30-yard line when it appeared that he was headed to the end zone for an easy touchdown, after receiving a 55-yard pass from quarterback Peyton Manning. Three plays later, Manning threw an interception that was returned by Chargers' cornerback Quentin Jammer 80 yards for a touchdown. The Chargers increased their lead to 24–0 just before halftime, with Rivers connecting on an 11-yard touchdown pass to Gates.

The Broncos then staged one of the most memorable comebacks in Monday Night Football history. On the opening drive of the second half, Manning led the Broncos on an 8-play, 85-yard drive, culminating with a 29-yard touchdown pass to wide receiver Demaryius Thomas. On the Chargers' next possession, Broncos' defensive end Elvis Dumervil forced a fumble off Rivers, and cornerback Tony Carter scooped up the football and returned it 65 yards for a touchdown. After the Broncos' defense forced a three-and-out, Manning hooked up with Decker on a 7-yard touchdown pass to pull the Broncos within 24–21 early in the fourth quarter. On the Chargers' next possession, Carter picked off Rivers, and four plays later, Manning tossed a 21-yard touchdown pass to wide receiver Brandon Stokley to give the Broncos a 28–24 lead with 9:09 remaining in the fourth quarter. The Chargers were attempting to rally, but Rivers was intercepted by cornerback Chris Harris, Jr. with 6:54 remaining. However, the Broncos were forced to punt seven plays later, giving the Chargers' offense the football with four minutes remaining. The Chargers once again tried to rally, but six plays later, Harris stepped in front of another Rivers' pass, returning an interception 46 yards for a touchdown, sealing the win for the Broncos.

==== Week 8: vs. New Orleans Saints ====
Week Eight: New Orleans Saints at Denver Broncos – Game summary

Quarter	1	2	3	4	Total
Saints	0	7	0	7	**14**
**Broncos**	7	10	7	10	**34**

at Sports Authority Field at Mile High, Denver, Colorado

- Date: October 28
- Game time: 6:20 pm. MDT
- Game weather: 59 °F (15 °C), partly cloudy
- Game attendance: 76,832
- Referee: Mike Carey
- TV announcers (NBC): Al Michaels, Cris Collinsworth and Michele Tafoya
- Recap, Gamebook

Game information

**First quarter**

- DEN – 4:39 Willis McGahee 1-yard TD run, Matt Prater kick. Drive: 11 plays, 98 yards, 4:39. (DEN 7–0)

**Second quarter**

- NO – 14:53 Darren Sproles 29-yard TD pass from Drew Brees, Garrett Hartley kick. Drive: 4 plays, 55 yards, 1:53. (tied 7–7)
- DEN – 6:43 Eric Decker 13-yard TD pass from Peyton Manning, Matt Prater kick. Drive: 5 plays, 56 yards, 2:17. (DEN 14–7)
- DEN – 0:00 Matt Prater 33-yard FG. Drive: 11 plays, 72 yards, 4:24. (DEN 17–7)

**Third quarter**

- DEN – 9:30 Demaryius Thomas 1-yard TD pass from Peyton Manning, Matt Prater kick. Drive: 11 plays, 93 yards, 5:30. (DEN 24–7)

**Fourth quarter**

- DEN – 14:54 Eric Decker 2-yard TD pass from Peyton Manning, Matt Prater kick. Drive: 4 plays, 51 yards, 1:57. (DEN 31–7)
- DEN – 5:27 Matt Prater 33-yard FG. Drive: 7 plays, 42 yards, 3:29. (DEN 34–7)
- NO – 2:03 Jimmy Graham 18-yard TD pass from Drew Brees, Garrett Hartley kick. Drive: 13 plays, 80 yards, 3:24. **(DEN 34–14)**

**Top passers**

- NO – Drew Brees: 22/42, 213 yards, 2 TD, 1 INT
- DEN – Peyton Manning: 22/30, 305 yards, 3 TD

**Top rushers**

- NO – Pierre Thomas: 8 rushes, 43 yards
- DEN – Willis McGahee: 23 rushes, 122 yards, 1 TD

**Top receivers**

- NO – Marques Colston and Jimmy Graham: 5 receptions and 63 yards each (1 TD for Graham)
- DEN – Demaryius Thomas: 7 receptions, 137 yards, 1 TD

**Top tacklers**

- NO – Roman Harper and Malcolm Jenkins: 8 tackles and 1 assist each
- DEN – Wesley Woodyard: 9 tackles, 4 assists, 1 sack, 1 forced fumble

Coming off their miraculous comeback in San Diego and subsequent bye week, the Broncos returned home for an interconference duel against the New Orleans Saints. The Broncos grabbed the lead in the first quarter, with running back Willis McGahee rushing for a 1-yard touchdown. On the Broncos' next possession, McGahee committed a fumble, and the Saints responded early in the second quarter, with quarterback Drew Brees throwing his 300th career touchdown pass—a 29-yarder to running back Darren Sproles. On the Saints' next possession, Brees was intercepted by linebacker Wesley Woodyard, and the Broncos dominated the remainder of the game. Quarterback Peyton Manning tossed a 13-yard touchdown pass to wide receiver Eric Decker and placekicker Matt Prater nailed a 33-yard field goal to close out the first half. The Broncos increased their lead in the third quarter, with Manning connecting on a 1-yard touchdown pass to wide receiver Demaryius Thomas, then pulled away in the fourth quarter, with a 2-yard touchdown pass from Manning to Decker and another 33-yard field goal by Prater. The Saints scored a late touchdown, with Brees connecting on an 18-yard pass to wide receiver Jimmy Graham, but the game had already been decided in the Broncos' favor.

Notes

Linebacker Joe Mays suffered a fractured fibula on a kickoff return during the fourth quarter, and was placed on the season-ending injured reserve the following day (October 29). Drew Brees surpassed John Elway for sixth on the NFL's all-time list for touchdown passes. However, Brees' personal record dropped to 0–7 in games played at Denver.

==== Week 9: at Cincinnati Bengals ====
Week Nine: Denver Broncos at Cincinnati Bengals – Game summary

Quarter	1	2	3	4	Total
**Broncos**	3	7	7	14	**31**
Bengals	0	3	10	10	**23**

at Paul Brown Stadium, Cincinnati, Ohio

- Date: November 4
- Game time: 1:00 pm. EST/11:00 am. MST
- Game weather: 48 °F (9 °C), partly cloudy
- Game attendance: 63,623
- Referee: Scott Green
- TV announcers (CBS): Greg Gumbel and Dan Dierdorf
- Recap, Gamebook

Game information

**First quarter**

- DEN – 7:55 Matt Prater 43-yard FG. Drive: 12 plays, 55 yards, 5:26. (DEN 3–0)

**Second quarter**

- CIN – 14:12 Mike Nugent 28-yard FG. Drive: 10 plays, 57 yards, 4:23. (tied 3–3)
- DEN – 10:15 Eric Decker 13-yard TD pass from Peyton Manning, Matt Prater kick. Drive: 8 plays, 80 yards, 3:57. (DEN 10–3)

**Third quarter**

- DEN – 14:49 Trindon Holliday 105-yard kickoff return for a TD, Matt Prater kick. Drive: 0:11. (DEN 17–3)
- CIN – 11:33 A. J. Green 10-yard TD pass from Andy Dalton, Mike Nugent kick. Drive: 6 plays, 80 yards, 3:16. (DEN 17–10)
- CIN – 1:17 Mike Nugent 49-yard FG. Drive: 9 plays, 49 yards, 4:13. (DEN 17–13)

**Fourth quarter**

- CIN – 14:10 BenJarvus Green-Ellis 2-yard TD run, Mike Nugent kick. Drive: 4 plays, 27 yards, 0:51. (CIN 20–17)
- DEN – 11:47 Joel Dreessen 1-yard TD pass from Peyton Manning, Matt Prater kick. Drive: 5 plays, 80 yards, 2:23. (DEN 24–20)
- DEN – 3:36 Eric Decker 4-yard TD pass from Peyton Manning, Matt Prater kick. Drive: 8 plays, 46 yards, 5:02. (DEN 31–20)
- CIN – 0:52 Mike Nugent 41-yard FG. Drive: 12 plays, 47 yards, 2:44. **(DEN 31–23)**

**Top passers**

- DEN – Peyton Manning: 27/35, 291 yards, 3 TD, 2 INT
- CIN – Andy Dalton: 26/42, 299 yards, 1 TD, 1 INT

**Top rushers**

- DEN – Willis McGahee: 23 yards, 66 yards
- CIN – BenJarvus Green-Ellis: 17 rushes, 56 yards, 1 TD

**Top receivers**

- DEN – Eric Decker: 8 receptions, 99 yards, 2 TD
- CIN – Jermaine Gresham: 6 receptions, 108 yards

**Top tacklers**

- DEN – Champ Bailey: 5 tackles, 1 assist
- CIN – Chris Crocker: 5 tackles, 2 assists

Coming off their dominating win over the Saints, the Broncos traveled to Paul Brown Stadium for an AFC duel with the Cincinnati Bengals. A 43-yard field goal by placekicker Matt Prater gave the Broncos an early lead, but the Bengals countered in the second quarter, with a 28-yard field goal by placekicker Mike Nugent. The Broncos responded, with a 13-yard touchdown pass from quarterback Peyton Manning to wide receiver Eric Decker. The Broncos added to their lead, when return specialist Trindon Holliday took the opening kickoff of the second half 105 yards for a touchdown. However, the Bengals would reel off 17 unanswered points, consisting of a 10-yard touchdown pass from quarterback Andy Dalton to wide receiver A. J. Green, a 49-field goal by Nugent followed in the fourth quarter by running back BenJarvus Green-Ellis rushing for a 2-yard touchdown, with the latter two scores coming off Manning interceptions. This gave Cincinnati a 20–17 lead early in the fourth quarter. The Broncos re-claimed the lead on their next possession, with Manning connecting on a 1-yard touchdown pass to tight end Joel Dreessen. Ten plays into the Bengals' next possession, Dalton was intercepted by cornerback Champ Bailey at the Bengals' 46-yard line, and the Broncos subsequently added to their lead eight plays later, with a 4-yard touchdown pass from Manning to Decker. Trailing 31–20 with 3:36 remaining in the fourth quarter, the Bengals tried to rally, with Nugent nailing a 41-yard field goal with 52 seconds remaining, but the Broncos recovered the onside kick in the game's final minute and subsequently ran out the clock.

Notes

Peyton Manning improved his personal record to 8–0 all-time in games against the Bengals.

==== Week 10: at Carolina Panthers ====
Week Ten: Denver Broncos at Carolina Panthers – Game summary

Quarter	1	2	3	4	Total
**Broncos**	7	10	7	12	**36**
Panthers	7	0	0	7	**14**

at Bank of America Stadium, Charlotte, North Carolina

- Date: November 11
- Game time: 1:00 pm. EST/11:00 am. MST
- Game weather: 71 °F (22 °C), sunny
- Game attendance: 73,939
- Referee: Alberto Riveron
- TV announcers (CBS): Jim Nantz and Phil Simms
- Recap, Gamebook

Game information

**First quarter**

- CAR – 6:46 Greg Olsen 4-yard TD pass from Cam Newton, Justin Medlock kick. Drive: 6 plays, 77 yards, 3:04. (CAR 7–0)
- DEN – 1:32 Brandon Stokley 10-yard TD pass from Peyton Manning, Matt Prater kick. Drive: 5 plays, 59 yards, 2:16. (tied 7–7)

**Second quarter**

- DEN – 14:40 Trindon Holliday 76-yard punt return for a TD, Matt Prater kick. (DEN 14–7)
- DEN – 10:12 Matt Prater 53-yard FG. Drive: 6 plays, 20 yards, 3:26. (DEN 17–7)

**Third quarter**

- DEN – 9:59 Tony Carter 40-yard interception return for a TD, Matt Prater kick. (DEN 24–7)

**Fourth quarter**

- DEN – 14:17 Matt Prater 27-yard FG. Drive: 9 plays, 62 yards, 3:25. (DEN 27–7)
- DEN – 10:32 Cam Newton sacked by Mike Adams in end zone for a safety (DEN 29–7)
- CAR – 5:09 Greg Olsen 5-yard TD pass from Cam Newton, Justin Medlock kick. Drive: 10 plays, 77 yards, 4:22. (DEN 29–14)
- DEN – 3:23 Ronnie Hillman 5-yard TD run, Matt Prater kick. Drive: 4 plays, 54 yards, 1:46. **(DEN 36–14)**

**Top passers**

- DEN – Peyton Manning: 27/38, 301 yards, 1 TD
- CAR – Cam Newton: 21/36, 241 yards, 2 TD, 2 INT

**Top rushers**

- DEN – Willis McGahee: 14 rushes, 56 yards
- CAR – Jonathan Stewart: 8 rushes, 31 yards

**Top receivers**

- DEN – Demaryius Thomas: 9 receptions, 135 yards
- CAR – Greg Olsen: 9 receptions, 102 yards

**Top tacklers**

- DEN – Chris Harris, Jr. and Von Miller: 6 tackles each, (1 assist, 1 sack and 1 forced fumble by Miller)
- CAR – Luke Kuechly: 6 tackles, 4 assists

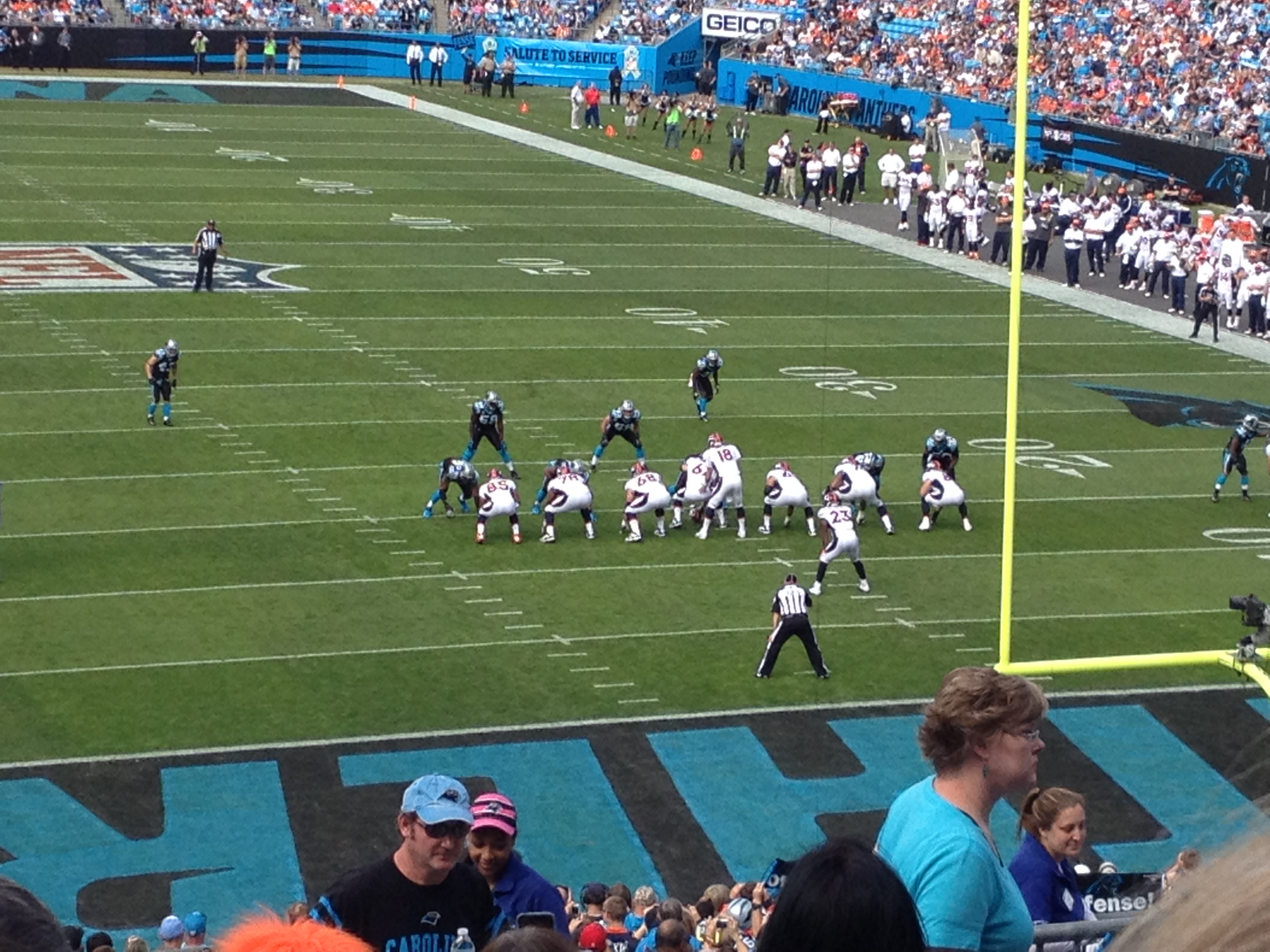
The Broncos on offense against the Carolina Panthers in week 10

Hoping to add to a three-game winning streak, the Broncos traveled to Charlotte, North Carolina for an interconference match-up with the Carolina Panthers at Bank of America Stadium. In the first quarter, the Panthers struck first, with quarterback Cam Newton connecting on a 4-yard touchdown pass to tight end Greg Olsen. However, the Broncos would reel off 29 unanswered points and dominate the remainder of the game. Quarterback Peyton Manning threw a 10-yard touchdown pass to wide receiver Brandon Stokley. The Broncos grabbed the lead in the second quarter, with return specialist Trindon Holliday returning a punt 76 yards for a touchdown, followed by a 53-yard field goal by placekicker Matt Prater, then in the third quarter, cornerback Tony Carter returned an interception off Newton 40 yards for a touchdown. Prater added a 27-yard field goal in the fourth quarter, followed by safety Mike Adams sacking Newton in the end zone for a safety. The Panthers responded in the fourth quarter, with a 5-yard touchdown pass from Newton to Olsen, but the Broncos put the game out of reach, with running back Ronnie Hillman rushing for a 5-yard touchdown.

Notes

The Broncos' defense harassed Cam Newton throughout the game, sacking Newton seven times. This was Broncos' head coach John Fox's first visit to Carolina, where he served as head coach of the Panthers from 2002 to 2010.

==== Week 11: vs. San Diego Chargers ====
Week Eleven: San Diego Chargers at Denver Broncos – Game summary

Quarter	1	2	3	4	Total
Chargers	7	0	9	7	**23**
**Broncos**	0	17	7	6	**30**

at Sports Authority Field at Mile High, Denver, Colorado

- Date: November 18
- Game time: 2:25 pm. MST
- Game weather: 62 °F (17 °C), sunny
- Game attendance: 76,769
- Referee: Carl Cheffers
- TV announcers (CBS): Kevin Harlan and Solomon Wilcots
- Recap, Gamebook

Game information

**First quarter**

- SD – 6:52 Eric Weddle 23-yard interception return for a TD, Nick Novak kick. (SD 7–0)

**Second quarter**

- DEN – 13:00 Demaryius Thomas 13-yard TD pass from Peyton Manning, Matt Prater kick. Drive: 6 plays, 56 yards, 2:20. (tied 7–7)
- DEN – 11:33 Matt Prater 19-yard FG. Drive: 4 plays, 7 yards, 1:14. (DEN 10–7)
- DEN – 1:44 Brandon Stokley 31-yard TD pass from Peyton Manning, Matt Prater kick. Drive: 1 play, 31 yards, 0:07. (DEN 17–7)

**Third quarter**

- SD – 12:48 Peyton Manning sacked by Shaun Phillips in the end zone for a safety (DEN 17–9)
- DEN – 7:23 Eric Decker 20-yard TD pass from Peyton Manning, Matt Prater kick. Drive: 3 plays, 25 yards, 0:18. (DEN 24–9)
- SD – 0:58 Danario Alexander 8-yard TD pass from Philip Rivers, Nick Novak kick. Drive: 12 plays, 80 yards, 6:25. (DEN 24–16)

**Fourth quarter**

- DEN – 10:43 Matt Prater 30-yard FG. Drive: 10 plays, 67 yards, 5:15. (DEN 27–16)
- DEN – 4:14 Matt Prater 32-yard FG. Drive: 11 plays, 57 yards, 4:56. (DEN 30–16)
- SD – 1:24 Danario Alexander 21-yard TD pass from Philip Rivers, Mike Scifres kick. Drive: 8 plays, 80 yards, 2:50. **(DEN 30–23)**

**Top passers**

- SD – Philip Rivers: 24/40, 258 yards, 2 TD, 2 INT
- DEN – Peyton Manning: 25/42, 270 yards, 3 TD, 1 INT

**Top rushers**

- SD – Ryan Mathews: 15 rushes, 47 yards
- DEN – Willis McGahee: 7 rushes, 55 yards

**Top receivers**

- SD – Danario Alexander: 7 receptions, 96 yards, 2 TD
- DEN – Brandon Stokley: 4 receptions, 55 yards, 1 TD

**Top tacklers**

- SD – Donald Butler: 7 tackles, 1 assist, 1 forced fumble
- DEN – Champ Bailey: 8 tackles

Hoping to add to a four-game winning streak, the Broncos returned home for an AFC West rematch with the San Diego Chargers. The Chargers grabbed the lead in the first quarter, with safety Eric Weddle returning an interception off Broncos' quarterback Peyton Manning 23 yards for a touchdown. The Broncos responded early in the second quarter, with Manning connecting on a 13-yard touchdown pass to wide receiver Demaryius Thomas. On the Chargers' next possession, quarterback Philip Rivers was intercepted by Broncos' safety Jim Leonhard deep in Chargers' territory. However, the Broncos had to settle for a 19-yard field goal by placekicker Matt Prater. On the first play after the two-minute warning, Broncos' linebacker Nate Irving blocked Mike Scifres' punt, and on the next play, Manning threw a 31-yard touchdown pass to wide receiver Brandon Stokley, giving the Broncos a 17–7 lead. The first points of the third quarter came from the Chargers, with linebacker Shaun Phillips sacking Manning in the end zone for a safety. After linebacker Wesley Woodyard recovered a Rivers' fumble deep in Chargers' territory, the Broncos increased their lead, with Manning throwing a 20-yard touchdown pass to wide receiver Eric Decker. However, the Chargers responded late in the third quarter, with Rivers connecting on an 8-yard touchdown pass to wide receiver Danario Alexander. A pair of field goals by Prater in the fourth quarter—from 30 and 32 yards—gave the Broncos a 30–16 lead with 4:14 remaining in the game. The Chargers tried to rally, with a 21-yard touchdown pass from Rivers to Alexander with 1:24 remaining. However, the Broncos' recovered the onside kick, and subsequently ran out the clock.

Notes

With the win, the Broncos earned their first season sweep of the Chargers since 2005, and snapped the Chargers' three-game winning streak in Denver. Nate Irving's block of a Mike Scifres' punt marked the first time since 2007 that the Broncos' special teams blocked a punt. This was the only game during the 2012 season in which the Broncos wore their alternate navy blue jerseys.

Injuries

Running back Willis McGahee suffered a ruptured MCL and compression fracture in his right knee during the second quarter, when his knee was hit by the helmet of Chargers' cornerback Quentin Jammer. On November 21, McGahee was placed on the injured reserve/designated for return list.

==== Week 12: at Kansas City Chiefs ====
Week Twelve: Denver Broncos at Kansas City Chiefs – Game summary

Quarter	1	2	3	4	Total
**Broncos**	0	7	7	3	**17**
Chiefs	6	0	3	0	**9**

at Arrowhead Stadium, Kansas City, Missouri

- Date: November 25
- Game time: 12:00 p.m. CST/11:00 am. MST
- Game weather: 52 °F (11 °C), sunny
- Game attendance: 74,244
- Referee: Jerome Boger
- TV announcers (CBS): Greg Gumbel and Dan Dierdorf
- Recap, Gamebook

Game information

**First quarter**

- KC – 9:20 Ryan Succop 34-yard FG. Drive: 11 plays, 55 yards, 5:40. (KC 3–0)
- KC – 4:31 Ryan Succop 22-yard FG. Drive: 7 plays, 33 yards, 3:25. (KC 6–0)

**Second quarter**

- DEN – 0:18 Jacob Tamme 7-yard TD pass from Peyton Manning, Matt Prater kick. Drive: 11 plays, 94 yards, 4:57. (DEN 7–6)

**Third quarter**

- KC – 7:35 Ryan Succop 49-yard FG. Drive: 8 plays, 46 yards, 4:22. (KC 9–7)
- DEN – 4:41 Demaryius Thomas 30-yard TD pass from Peyton Manning, Matt Prater kick. Drive: 7 plays, 80 yards, 2:54. (DEN 14–9)

**Fourth quarter**

- DEN – 0:14 Matt Prater 34-yard FG. Drive: 12 plays, 68 yards, 6:10. **(DEN 17–9)**

**Top passers**

- DEN – Peyton Manning: 22/37, 285 yards, 2 TD, 1 INT
- KC – Brady Quinn: 13/25, 126 yards, 1 INT

**Top rushers**

- DEN – Knowshon Moreno: 20 rushes, 85 yards
- KC – Jamaal Charles: 23 rushes, 107 yards

**Top receivers**

- DEN – Demaryius Thomas: 4 receptions, 82 yards, 1 TD
- KC – Dwayne Bowe: 4 receptions, 41 yards

**Top tacklers**

- DEN – Wesley Woodyard and Mike Adams: 8 tackles each (1 assist and 1 sack by Woodyard)
- KC – Javier Arenas, Jalil Brown, Abram Elam and Kendrick Lewis: 5 tackles each

Hoping to add to a five-game winning streak, the Broncos traveled to Arrowhead Stadium for an AFC West duel with the Kansas City Chiefs. Two field goals by Chiefs' placekicker Ryan Succop—from 34 and 22 yards—game Kansas City a 6–0 lead in the first quarter. The Broncos grabbed the lead just before halftime, with quarterback Peyton Manning throwing a 7-yard touchdown pass to tight end Jacob Tamme. The Chiefs re-claimed the lead in the third quarter, with a 49-yard field goal by Succop, however, the Broncos responded, with Manning connecting on a 30-yard touchdown pass to wide receiver Demaryius Thomas. For the last 4:41 of the third quarter and the first 8:36 of the fourth quarter, each team proceeded to trade punts, until the Broncos' offense got the football with 6:24 remaining in the game. The Broncos drove 68 yards in 12 plays, eating up 6:10 off the clock, culminating with placekicker Matt Prater nailing a 34-yard field goal with only 14 seconds remaining to give the Broncos some breathing room. The Broncos' defense thwarted the Chiefs' last desperation drive. With the hard-fought win, the Broncos matched their win total from 2011.

==== Week 13: vs. Tampa Bay Buccaneers ====
Week Thirteen: Tampa Bay Buccaneers at Denver Broncos – Game summary

Quarter	1	2	3	4	Total
Buccaneers	10	0	0	13	**23**
**Broncos**	7	0	21	3	**31**

at Sports Authority Field at Mile High, Denver, Colorado

- Date: December 2
- Game time: 2:05 pm. MST
- Game weather: 64 °F (18 °C), partly cloudy
- Game attendance: 76,432
- Referee: Terry McAulay
- TV announcers (Fox): Dick Stockton, John Lynch and Jennifer Hale
- Recap, Gamebook

Game information

**First quarter**

- DEN – 8:47 Mitch Unrein 1-yard TD pass from Peyton Manning, Matt Prater kick. Drive: 10 plays, 65 yards, 4:00. (DEN 7–0)
- TB – 4:41 Connor Barth 31-yard FG. Drive: 9 plays, 66 yards, 4:06. (DEN 7–3)
- TB – 0:14 Dallas Clark 11-yard TD pass from Josh Freeman, Connor Barth kick. Drive: 5 plays, 70 yards, 2:31. (TB 10–7)

**Second quarter**

- No scoring plays

**Third quarter**

- DEN – 9:21 Demaryius Thomas 8-yard TD pass from Peyton Manning, Matt Prater kick. Drive: 4 plays, 52 yards, 1:22. (DEN 14–10)
- DEN – 4:39 Demaryius Thomas 10-yard TD pass from Peyton Manning, Matt Prater kick. Drive: 7 plays, 57 yards, 3:23. (DEN 21–10)
- DEN – 3:56 Von Miller 26-yard interception return for a TD, Matt Prater kick. (DEN 28–10)

**Fourth quarter**

- TB – 14:55 Connor Barth 50-yard FG. Drive: 6 plays, 16 yards, 2:11. (DEN 28–13)
- DEN – 7:36 Matt Prater 31-yard FG. Drive: 14 plays, 68 yards, 7:19. (DEN 31–13)
- TB – 3:23 Connor Barth 55-yard FG. Drive: 5 plays, 26 yards, 1:14. (DEN 31–16)
- TB – 2:33 Mike Williams 5-yard TD pass from Josh Freeman, Connor Barth kick. Drive: 4 plays, 47 yards, 0:24. **(DEN 31–23)**

**Top passers**

- TB – Josh Freeman: 18/29, 242 yards, 2 TD, 1 INT
- DEN – Peyton Manning: 27/38, 242 yards, 3 TD, 1 INT

**Top rushers**

- TB – Doug Martin: 18 rushes, 56 yards
- DEN – Knowshon Moreno: 20 rushes, 69 yards

**Top receivers**

- TB – Mike Williams: 6 receptions, 93 yards, 1 TD
- DEN – Demaryius Thomas: 8 receptions, 99 yards, 2 TD

**Top tacklers**

- TB – Lavonte David: 7 tackles, 3 assists
- DEN – Chris Harris, Jr. and Von Miller: 5 tackles and 1 assist each (1 sack, 1 interception and 1 forced fumble by Miller)

Hoping to add to a six-game winning streak, the Broncos returned home for an interconference duel with the Tampa Bay Buccaneers. The Broncos grabbed the early lead, when defensive tackle Mitch Unrein, lining up as a fullback, caught a 1-yard touchdown pass from quarterback Peyton Manning. The Buccaneers responded, with a 31-yard field goal by placekicker Connor Barth, then grabbed the lead at the end of the first quarter, with quarterback Josh Freeman connecting on an 11-yard touchdown pass to tight end Dallas Clark. After a scoreless second quarter, the Broncos re-claimed the lead for good with 21 unanswered points, consisting of two Manning touchdown passes to wide receiver Demaryius Thomas—from 8 and 10 yards, followed by linebacker Von Miller returning an interception off Freeman 26 yards for a touchdown. After a Manning interception late in the third quarter, a 50-yard field goal by Barth to begin the fourth quarter narrowed the gap to 28–13, but the Broncos countered with a 31-yard field goal by placekicker Matt Prater. With 4:37 remaining in the game, the Buccaneers tried to rally, with a 55-yard field goal by Barth, followed by a 5-yard touchdown pass from Freeman to wide receiver Mike Williams with 2:39 remaining. However, the Buccaneers' onside kick attempt was unsuccessful, and the Broncos subsequently ran out the clock.

Notes

With the win, the Broncos exceeded their win total from 2011, and also clinched their second consecutive AFC West division title. This was the 12th division title in the Broncos' franchise history, tying the Oakland Raiders for the all-time lead in AFC West championships since the 1970 AFL–NFL merger. The Broncos also clinched consecutive division titles for the first time since 1986–87.

==== Week 14: at Oakland Raiders ====
Week Fourteen: Denver Broncos at Oakland Raiders – Game summary

Quarter	1	2	3	4	Total
**Broncos**	10	3	13	0	**26**
Raiders	0	7	0	6	**13**

at O.co Coliseum, Oakland, California

- Date: December 6
- Game time: 6:20 pm. MST/5:20 pm. PST
- Game weather: 57 °F (14 °C), cloudy skies
- Game attendance: 53,807
- Referee: Clete Blakeman
- TV announcers (NFLN): Brad Nessler, Mike Mayock and Alex Flanagan
- Recap, Gamebook

Game information

**First quarter**

- DEN – 10:30 Joel Dreessen 6-yard TD pass from Peyton Manning, Matt Prater kick. Drive: 10 plays, 68 yards, 4:30. (DEN 7–0)
- DEN – 5:09 Matt Prater 43-yard FG. Drive: 10 plays, 50 yards, 4:42. (DEN 10–0)

**Second quarter**

- DEN – 13:39 Matt Prater 34-yard FG. Drive: 10 plays, 64 yards, 4:14. (DEN 13–0)
- OAK – 1:59 Darren McFadden 6-yard TD pass from Carson Palmer, Sebastian Janikowski kick. Drive: 14 plays, 80 yards, 6:33. (DEN 13–7)

**Third quarter**

- DEN – 7:30 Matt Prater 20-yard FG. Drive: 10 plays, 89 yards, 5:03. (DEN 16–7)
- DEN – 5:07 Knowshon Moreno 1-yard TD run, Matt Prater kick. Drive: 2 plays, 2 yards, 0:38. (DEN 23–7)
- DEN – 0:19 Matt Prater 33-yard FG. Drive: 8 plays, 49 yards, 3:18. (DEN 26–7)

**Fourth quarter**

- OAK – 5:36 Darrius Heyward-Bey 56-yard TD pass from Carson Palmer, two-point pass failed. Drive: 4 plays, 86 yards, 1:50. **(DEN 26–13)**

**Top passers**

- DEN – Peyton Manning: 26/36, 310 yards, 1 TD, 1 INT
- OAK – Carson Palmer: 19/30, 273 yards, 2 TD, 1 INT

**Top rushers**

- DEN – Knowshon Moreno: 32 rushes, 119 yards, 1 TD
- OAK – Darren McFadden: 11 rushes, 52 yards

**Top receivers**

- DEN – Eric Decker: 8 rushes, 88 yards
- OAK – Rod Streater: 4 receptions, 100 yards

**Top tacklers**

- DEN – Tony Carter and D. J. Williams: 4 tackles each (2 assists by Carter, 1 assist by Williams)
- OAK – Joselio Hanson: 8 tackles, 1 assist

Hoping to add to a seven-game winning streak, the Broncos traveled to the O.co Coliseum for an AFC West rematch with the Oakland Raiders. The Broncos jumped out to a 13–0 lead, with quarterback Peyton Manning throwing a 6-yard touchdown pass to tight end Joel Dreessen, followed by field goals of 43 and 34 from placekicker Matt Prater, with the latter field goal occurring early in the second quarter. The Raiders got on the scoreboard late in the first half, with quarterback Carson Palmer throwing a 6-yard touchdown pass to running back Darren McFadden. The Broncos added to their lead in the third quarter, with a 20-yard field goal by Prater, a 1-yard touchdown run by running back Knowshon Moreno and a 33-yard field goal by Prater. A 56-yard touchdown pass from Palmer to wide receiver Darrius Heyward-Bey (with a failed two-point conversion attempt) was the only scoring play of the fourth quarter, and the Broncos ran out the final 5:36 of the game.

Notes

With the win, the Broncos earned their first season sweep of the Raiders since 2006, and also swept their division rivals on the road for the third time in four seasons.

==== Week 15: at Baltimore Ravens ====
Week Fifteen: Denver Broncos at Baltimore Ravens – Game summary

Quarter	1	2	3	4	Total
**Broncos**	3	14	14	3	**34**
Ravens	0	0	3	14	**17**

at M&T Bank Stadium, Baltimore, Maryland

- Date: December 16
- Game time: 1:00 pm. EST/11:00 am. MST
- Game weather: 53 °F (12 °C), cloudy
- Game attendance: 71,317
- Referee: Pete Morelli
- TV announcers (CBS): Greg Gumbel and Dan Dierdorf
- Recap, Gamebook

Game information

**First quarter**

- DEN – 7:13 Matt Prater 27-yard FG. Drive: 11 plays, 44 yards, 4:56. (DEN 3–0)

**Second quarter**

- DEN – 11:51 Jacob Hester 1-yard TD run, Matt Prater kick. Drive: 11 plays, 78 yards, 4:12. (DEN 10–0)
- DEN – 0:15 Chris Harris, Jr. 98-yard interception return for a TD, Matt Prater kick. (DEN 17–0)

**Third quarter**

- BAL – 12:18 Justin Tucker 45-yard FG. Drive: 8 plays, 29 yards, 2:42. (DEN 17–3)
- DEN – 9:53 Eric Decker 51-yard TD pass from Peyton Manning, Matt Prater kick. Drive: 5 plays, 83 yards, 2:25. (DEN 24–3)
- DEN – 7:40 Knowshon Moreno 6-yard TD run, Matt Prater kick. Drive: 4 plays, 39 yards, 1:16. (DEN 31–3)

**Fourth quarter**

- BAL – 14:31 Dennis Pitta 31-yard TD pass from Joe Flacco, Justin Tucker kick. Drive: 4–36, 1:17. (DEN 31–10)
- DEN – 4:32 Matt Prater 36-yard FG. Drive: 15 plays, 62, yards, 9:59. (DEN 34–10)
- BAL – 4:08 Dennis Pitta 61-yard TD pass from Joe Flacco, Justin Tucker kick. Drive: 1 play, 61 yards, 0:24. **(DEN 34–17)**

**Top passers**

- DEN – Peyton Manning: 17/28, 204 yards, 1 TD
- BAL – Joe Flacco: 20/40, 254 yards, 2 TD, 1 INT

**Top rushers**

- DEN – Knowshon Moreno: 22 rushes, 118 yards, 1 TD
- BAL – Ray Rice: 12 rushes, 38 yards

**Top receivers**

- DEN – Eric Decker: 8 receptions, 133 yards, 1 TD
- BAL – Dennis Pitta: 7 receptions, 125 yards, 2 TD

**Top tacklers**

- DEN – Champ Bailey: 6 tackles
- BAL – Josh Bynes: 11 tackles, 2 assists

Hoping to add to an eight-game winning streak, the Broncos traveled to M&T Bank Stadium for an AFC duel with the Baltimore Ravens, where the Broncos had never won in four previous regular-season meetings. A 27-yard field goal by Broncos' placekicker Matt Prater was the only scoring play of the first quarter. The Broncos increased their lead in the second quarter, with fullback Jacob Hester rushing for a 1-yard touchdown. The Ravens were threatening to narrow the Broncos' lead just before halftime; however, Broncos' cornerback Chris Harris, Jr. stepped in front of a pass from Ravens' quarterback Joe Flacco, returning an interception 98 yards for a touchdown. The Ravens finally got on the scoreboard in the third quarter, with a 45-yard field goal by placekicker Justin Tucker. However, the Broncos added to their lead, with quarterback Peyton Manning throwing a 51-yard touchdown pass to wide receiver Eric Decker, followed by a 6-yard touchdown run from running back Knowshon Moreno to give the Broncos a commanding 31–3 lead. The Ravens finally got into the end zone early in the fourth quarter, with Flacco connecting on a 31-yard touchdown pass to tight end Dennis Pitta, but the Broncos responded with a 36-yard field goal from Prater. The Ravens added one more score, with a 61-yard touchdown pass from Flacco to Pitta, but the Broncos' lead was too much for the Ravens to overcome.

Notes

This was the Broncos' first-ever, and, to date, their only win in Baltimore.

==== Week 16: vs. Cleveland Browns ====
Week Sixteen: Cleveland Browns at Denver Broncos – Game summary

Quarter	1	2	3	4	Total
Browns	3	0	3	6	**12**
**Broncos**	7	7	7	13	**34**

at Sports Authority Field at Mile High, Denver, Colorado

- Date: December 23
- Game time: 2:05 pm. MST
- Game weather: 51 °F (11 °C), partly cloudy
- Game attendance: 76,351
- Referee: Alberto Riveron
- TV announcers (CBS): Ian Eagle and Dan Fouts
- Recap, Gamebook

Game information

**First quarter**

- DEN – 12:10 Demaryius Thomas 22-yard TD pass from Peyton Manning, Matt Prater kick. Drive: 8 plays, 80 yards, 2:50. (DEN 7–0)
- CLE – 4:35 Phil Dawson 27-yard FG. Drive: 14 plays, 63 yards, 7:35. (DEN 7–3)

**Second quarter**

- DEN – 12:40 Eric Decker 10-yard TD pass from Peyton Manning, Matt Prater kick. Drive: 15 plays, 80 yards, 6:55. (DEN 14–3)

**Third quarter**

- CLE – 11:09 Phil Dawson 53-yard FG. Drive: 9 plays, 45 yards, 3:51. (DEN 14–6)
- DEN – 4:33 Eric Decker 8-yard TD pass from Peyton Manning, Matt Prater kick. Drive: 12 plays, 91 yards, 6:36. (DEN 21–6)

**Fourth quarter**

- DEN – 14:53 Matt Prater 27-yard FG. Drive: 8 plays, 39 yards, 3:22. (DEN 24–6)
- DEN – 12:11 Jacob Hester 1-yard TD run, Matt Prater kick. Drive: 2 plays, 19 yards, 0:15. (DEN 31–6)
- CLE – 7:56 Greg Little 6-yard TD pass from Colt McCoy, two-point run failed. Drive: 10 plays, 80 yards, 4:15. (DEN 31–12)
- DEN – 1:55 Matt Prater 41-yard FG. Drive: 6 plays, 22 yards, 2:02. **(DEN 34–12)**

**Top passers**

- CLE – Brandon Weeden: 12/19, 104 yards
- DEN – Peyton Manning: 30/43, 339 yards, 3 TD, 1 INT

**Top rushers**

- CLE – Trent Richardson: 9 rushes, 53 yards
- DEN – Knowshon Moreno: 22 rushes, 78 yards

**Top receivers**

- CLE – Greg Little: 6 receptions, 58 yards, 1 TD
- DEN – Demaryius Thomas: 9 receptions, 102 yards, 1 TD

**Top tacklers**

- CLE – Craig Robertson: 12 tackles, 2 assists
- DEN – Chris Harris, Jr.: 8 tackles

Hoping to add to a nine-game winning streak, the Broncos returned home for an AFC match-up with the Cleveland Browns. On the game's opening drive, quarterback Peyton Manning threw a 22-yard touchdown pass to wide receiver Demaryius Thomas. The Browns got on the scoreboard, with a 27-yard field goal by placekicker Phil Dawson. A 10-yard touchdown pass from Manning to wide receiver Eric Decker was the only scoring play of the second quarter. The Browns narrowed the Broncos' lead early in the third quarter, with a 53-yard field goal by Dawson, but the Broncos would add 17 unanswered points to their lead, with an 8-yard touchdown pass from Manning to Decker, followed in the fourth quarter by a 27-yard field goal by placekicker Matt Prater and a 1-yard touchdown run by fullback Jacob Hester. The Browns finally scored a touchdown midway through the fourth quarter, with quarterback Colt McCoy connecting on a 6-yard pass to wide receiver Greg Little, but the Broncos' lead was too much for the Browns to overcome. Prater added a 41-yard field goal to close out the scoring.

Notes

The Broncos matched their win total from the two previous seasons combined, and also swept the AFC North division. The Broncos won their 10th consecutive game against the Browns, dating back to the 1991 season, and improved their all-time series record against the Browns to 22–5 (including the playoffs).

==== Week 17: vs. Kansas City Chiefs ====
Week Seventeen: Kansas City Chiefs at Denver Broncos – Game summary

Quarter	1	2	3	4	Total
Chiefs	0	3	0	0	**3**
**Broncos**	7	14	14	3	**38**

at Sports Authority Field at Mile High, Denver, Colorado

- Date: December 30
- Game time: 2:25 pm. MST
- Game weather: 35 °F (2 °C), partly cloudy
- Game attendance: 76,502
- Referee: Ed Hochuli
- TV announcers (CBS): Ian Eagle and Dan Fouts
- Recap, Gamebook

Game information

**First quarter**

- DEN – 9:56 Knowshon Moreno 3-yard TD run, Matt Prater kick. Drive: 8 plays, 69 yards, 3:06. (DEN 7–0)

**Second quarter**

- KC – 14:53 Ryan Succop 23-yard FG. Drive: 4 plays, 7 yards, 1:16. (DEN 7–3)
- DEN – 5:32 Eric Decker 11-yard TD pass from Peyton Manning, Matt Prater kick. Drive: 9 plays, 76 yards, 4:00. (DEN 14–3)
- DEN – 0:10 Eric Decker 16-yard TD pass from Peyton Manning, Matt Prater kick. Drive: 8 plays, 59 yards, 1:27. (DEN 21–3)

**Third quarter**

- DEN – 9:10 Demaryius Thomas 13-yard TD pass from Peyton Manning, Matt Prater kick. Drive: 11 plays, 80 yards, 5:50. (DEN 28–3)
- DEN – 1:04 Lance Ball 1-yard TD run, Matt Prater kick. Drive: 9 plays, 74 yards, 5:36. (DEN 35–3)

**Fourth quarter**

- DEN – 8:09 Matt Prater 42-yard FG. Drive: 11 plays, 43 yards, 6:10. **(DEN 38–3)**

**Top passers**

- KC – Brady Quinn: 7/16, 49 yards
- DEN – Peyton Manning: 23/29, 304 yards, 3 TD

**Top rushers**

- KC – Jamaal Charles: 14 rushes, 53 yards
- DEN – Lance Ball: 15 rushes, 66 yards, 1 TD

**Top receivers**

- KC – Tony Moeaki: 2 receptions, 21 yards
- DEN – Demaryius Thomas: 7 receptions, 122 yards, 1 TD

**Top tacklers**

- KC – Justin Houston: 8 tackles, 1 assist
- DEN – Rahim Moore: 8 tackles, 1 sack

Hoping to add to a ten-game winning streak and gain momentum into the playoffs, the Broncos remained at home for an AFC West divisional rematch with the Kansas City Chiefs, in the 2012 regular season finale. The Broncos grabbed the early lead in the first quarter, with running back Knowshon Moreno rushing for a 3-yard touchdown. The Chiefs got on the scoreboard early in the second quarter, with a 23-yard field goal by placekicker Ryan Succop, in what would be the Chiefs' only scoring play of the game. The Broncos later added to their lead, with quarterback Peyton Manning throwing three touchdown passes—two to wide receiver Eric Decker—from 11 and 16 yards, followed in the third quarter by a 13-yarder to wide receiver Demaryius Thomas. The Broncos added another touchdown late in the third quarter, with running back Lance Ball rushing for a 1-yard touchdown. A 42-yard field goal by Broncos' placekicker Matt Prater in the fourth quarter was the last scoring play of the game.

Notes

With the win, the Broncos exceeded their win total from the two previous seasons combined, swept their AFC West division rivals for only the second time in franchise history, and earned their first season sweep of the Chiefs since 2007. At the time, the 35-point margin was the Broncos' largest margin of victory over the Chiefs in the 53-year history of this rivalry, until it was surpassed by a 38–0 win over the Chiefs in 2024. The win was also the 100th in John Fox's coaching career (including postseason games). By virtue of the Houston Texans' 28–16 loss to the Indianapolis Colts earlier in the day, the Broncos clinched a first-round bye and homefield advantage throughout the AFC playoffs.

=== Standings ===
==== Division ====
AFC West
	W	L	T	PCT	DIV	CONF	PF	PA	STK
^{(1)} Denver Broncos	13	3	0	.813	6–0	10–2	481	289	W11
San Diego Chargers	7	9	0	.438	4–2	7–5	350	350	W2
Oakland Raiders	4	12	0	.250	2–4	4–8	290	443	L2
Kansas City Chiefs	2	14	0	.125	0–6	0–12	211	425	L4

==== Conference ====
AFC
#	Team	Division	W	L	T	PCT	DIV	CONF	SOS	SOV	STK
**Division winners**
1	Denver Broncos	West	13	3	0	.813	6–0	10–2	.457	.385	W11
2 (Note: New England clinched the AFC's No. 2 seed over Houston based on a head-to-head victory.)	New England Patriots	East	12	4	0	.750	6–0	11–1	.496	.466	W2
3	Houston Texans	South	12	4	0	.750	5–1	10–2	.496	.432	L2
4 (Note: Baltimore clinched the AFC North title over Cincinnati based on a better divisional record (4–2 to 3–3).)	Baltimore Ravens	North	10	6	0	.625	4–2	8–4	.496	.438	L1
**Wild cards**
5	Indianapolis Colts	South	11	5	0	.688	4–2	8–4	.441	.403	W2
6	Cincinnati Bengals	North	10	6	0	.625	3–3	7–5	.438	.381	W3
**Did not qualify for the postseason**
7	Pittsburgh Steelers	North	8	8	0	.500	3–3	5–7	.465	.438	W1
8 (Note: San Diego finished with a better conference record than Miami (7–5 to 5–7).)	San Diego Chargers	West	7	9	0	.438	4–2	7–5	.457	.286	W2
9	Miami Dolphins	East	7	9	0	.438	2–4	5–7	.500	.415	L1
10 (Note: Tennessee finished ahead of New York Jets based on head-to-head victory.)	Tennessee Titans	South	6	10	0	.375	1–5	5–7	.512	.344	W1
11 (Note: New York Jets finished ahead of Buffalo in the AFC East based on record versus common opponents (5–7 to 3–9).)	New York Jets	East	6	10	0	.375	2–4	4–8	.512	.401	L3
12	Buffalo Bills	East	6	10	0	.375	2–4	5–7	.480	.281	W1
13	Cleveland Browns	North	5	11	0	.313	2–4	5–7	.508	.388	L3
14	Oakland Raiders	West	4	12	0	.250	2–4	4–8	.469	.219	L2
15 (Note: Jacksonville finished with a better conference record than Kansas City (2–10 to 0–12).)	Jacksonville Jaguars	South	2	14	0	.125	2–4	2–10	.539	.531	L5
16	Kansas City Chiefs	West	2	14	0	.125	0–6	0–12	.516	.438	L4
**Tiebreakers** (Note: When breaking ties for three or more teams under the NFL's rules, they are first broken within divisions, then comparing only the highest ranked remaining team from each division.)

=== Statistics ===
==== Team leaders ====
Category	Player(s)	Value
Passing yards	Peyton Manning	4,659
Passing touchdowns	Peyton Manning	37
Rushing yards	Willis McGahee	731
Rushing touchdowns	Willis McGahee; Knowshon Moreno	4
Receptions	Demaryius Thomas	94
Receiving yards	Demaryius Thomas	1,434
Receiving touchdowns	Eric Decker	13
Points	Matt Prater	133
Kickoff return yards	Trindon Holliday	358
Punt return yards	Trindon Holliday	334
Tackles	Wesley Woodyard	117
Sacks	Von Miller	18.5 *
Forced fumbles	Elvis Dumervil; Von Miller	6
Interceptions	Chris Harris, Jr. Wesley Woodyard	3

*	Indicates single-season franchise record.

Source for this section: Denver Broncos' official website.

==== League rankings ====
Offense
Category	Value	NFL rank (out of 32)
Total yards	397.9 YPG	4th
Yards per play	5.8	6th
Rushing yards	114.5 YPG	16th
Yards per rush	3.8	23rd
Passing yards	283.3 YPG	5th
Yards per pass	7.9	5th
Scoring	30.1 PPG	2nd
Pass completions	402/588 (.684)	2nd
Third downs	96/213 (.451)	3rd
Possession average	31:16	8th
Fewest sacks allowed	21	2nd
Turnover differential	−1	T−17th

Defense
Category	Value	NFL rank (out of 32)
Total yards	290.8 YPG	2nd
Yards per play	4.6	1st
Rushing yards	91.1 YPG	3rd
Yards per rush	3.6	2nd
Passing yards	199.6 YPG	3rd
Yards per pass	6.4	5th
Scoring	18.1 PPG	4th
Pass completions	321/559 (.574)	7th
Third downs	66/216 (.306)	1st
Sacks	52	T−1st
Forced fumbles	19	4th
Fumble recoveries	8	T–22nd
Interceptions	16	13th

Special Teams
Category	Value	NFL rank (out of 32)
Kickoff returns	23.1 YPR	18th
Punt returns	9.3 YPR	18th
Gross punting	46.3 YPP	17th
Net punting	43.3 YPP	5th
Kickoff coverage	22.1 YPR	7th
Punt coverage	6.2 YPR	2nd

Source for this section: NFL.com.

== Postseason ==
=== Schedule ===
Round	Date	Opponent (seed)	Result	Record	Venue	Recap
Wild Card	First-round bye					
Divisional	January 12, 2013	Baltimore Ravens (4)	L 35–38 (2OT)	0–1	Sports Authority Field at Mile High	Recap

=== Game summaries ===
==== AFC Divisional Playoffs: vs. (4) Baltimore Ravens ====
AFC Divisional Playoffs: (#4) Baltimore Ravens at (#1) Denver Broncos – Game summary

Quarter	1	2	3	4	OT	2OT	Total
Ravens	14	7	7	7	0	3	38
Broncos	14	7	7	7	0	0	35

at Sports Authority Field at Mile High, Denver, Colorado

- Date: January 12, 2013
- Game time: 2:30 p.m. MST
- Game weather: 13 °F (−11 °C), partly cloudy
- Game attendance: 76,732
- Referee: Bill Vinovich
- TV announcers (CBS): Greg Gumbel, Dan Dierdorf and Solomon Wilcots
- Recap, Gamebook

Game information

First quarter

- DEN – 12:14 Trindon Holliday 90-yard punt return for a TD, Matt Prater kick. (DEN 7–0)
- BAL – 10:31 Torrey Smith 59-yard TD pass from Joe Flacco, Justin Tucker kick. Drive: 4 plays, 94 yards, 1:43. (tied 7–7)
- BAL – 9:49 Corey Graham 39-yard interception return for a TD, Justin Tucker kick. (BAL 14–7)
- DEN – 4:02 Brandon Stokley 15-yard TD pass from Peyton Manning, Matt Prater kick. Drive: 11 plays, 74 yards, 5:47. (tied 14–14)

Second quarter

- DEN – 7:26 Knowshon Moreno 14-yard TD pass from Peyton Manning, Matt Prater kick. Drive: 8 plays, 86 yards, 3:35. (DEN 21–14)
- BAL – 0:36 Torrey Smith 32-yard TD pass from Joe Flacco, Justin Tucker kick. Drive: 3 plays, 58 yards, 0:40. (tied 21–21)

Third quarter

- DEN – 14:47 Trindon Holliday 104-yard kickoff return for a TD, Matt Prater kick. Drive: 0:13. (DEN 28–21)
- BAL – 0:20 Ray Rice 1-yard TD run, Justin Tucker kick. Drive: 5 plays, 37 yards, 2:27. (tied 28–28)

Fourth quarter

- DEN – 7:11 Demaryius Thomas 17-yard TD pass from Peyton Manning, Matt Prater kick. Drive: 10 plays, 88 yards, 4:58. (DEN 35–28)
- BAL – 0:31 Jacoby Jones 70-yard TD pass from Joe Flacco, Justin Tucker kick. Drive: 3 plays, 77 yards, 0:38. (tied 35–35)

First overtime

- No scoring plays

Second overtime

- BAL – 13:18 Justin Tucker 47-yard FG. Drive: 6 plays, 16 yards, 2:33. (BAL 38–35)

Top passers

- BAL – Joe Flacco: 18/34, 331 yards, 3 TD
- DEN – Peyton Manning: 28/43, 290 yards, 3 TD, 2 INT

Top rushers

- BAL – Ray Rice: 30 rushes, 131 yards, 1 TD
- DEN – Ronnie Hillman: 22 rushes, 83 yards

Top receivers

- BAL – Torrey Smith: 3 receptions, 98 yards, 2 TD
- DEN – Eric Decker: 6 receptions, 84 yards

Top tacklers

- BAL – Ray Lewis and Terrell Suggs: 10 tackles each (7 assists by Lewis, 2 sacks and 1 forced fumble by Suggs)
- DEN – Von Miller and Wesley Woodyard: 7 tackles each (2 assists by Miller)

Following a first-round bye, the Broncos kicked off the divisional round of the 2012–13 NFL playoffs at home by welcoming the Baltimore Ravens, whom the Broncos defeated in Baltimore four weeks earlier. A 90-yard punt return for a touchdown by return specialist Trindon Holliday gave the Broncos the early lead. However, the Ravens quickly responded, with quarterback Joe Flacco connecting on a 59-yard touchdown pass to wide receiver Torrey Smith, followed by cornerback Corey Graham returning an interception off Broncos' quarterback Peyton Manning 39 yards for a touchdown. The Broncos tied the game, with Manning throwing a 15-yard touchdown pass to wide receiver Brandon Stokley, then re-claimed the lead midway through the second quarter, with Manning connecting on a 14-yard touchdown pass to running back Knowshon Moreno. The Broncos had an opportunity to add to their lead just after the two-minute warning, but placekicker Matt Prater missed a 52-yard field goal, giving the Ravens excellent field goal position with 1:16 remaining until halftime. Three plays later, Flacco connected on another touchdown pass to Smith – this one from 32 yards.

Holliday took the opening kickoff of the second half 104 yards for a touchdown, but after a Manning fumble, the Ravens tied the game late in the third quarter, with running back Ray Rice rushing for a 1-yard touchdown. After each team's offense subsequently went three-and-out, the Broncos marched down the field on a 10-play, 88-yard drive, culminating with Manning throwing a 17-yard touchdown pass to wide receiver Demaryius Thomas midway through the fourth quarter. The Ravens, on their next possession, marched 44 yards in eight plays, but turned the ball over on downs with 3:12 remaining in regulation. The Broncos achieved one first-down with 2:23 remaining, which forced the Ravens to start using the last two of their three remaining timeouts on defense. After the two-minute warning, the Ravens had exhausted all of their team timeouts, however, the Broncos failed to convert a critical third-down run, and were forced to punt, giving the Ravens the football with 1:15 remaining in regulation. Three plays later, and with no timeouts, Flacco launched a 70-yard touchdown pass to wide receiver Jacoby Jones to tie the game at 35 with 31 seconds remaining to force overtime.

The Ravens won the overtime coin toss. Both teams were forced to punt on their first possessions. The Ravens once again were forced to punt on their next possession, and the Broncos' offense got the football with 3:37 remaining in the first overtime. However, seven plays into the Broncos' second overtime possession, Manning was intercepted again by Graham in Broncos' territory, giving the Ravens the football at the Broncos' 45-yard line with 1:01 remaining in the first overtime. Six plays later, Ravens' placekicker Justin Tucker nailed a game-winning 47-yard field early in the second overtime. Broncos lost and in 2013, 2014 and 2015 will have division titles

== Records and milestones ==
Numerous individual, franchise and league records and milestones were either tied, reached or broken during the season:

=== Team ===
- Week 6: The Broncos' rally from a 24–0 halftime deficit during the team's Week 6 win over the San Diego Chargers tied the largest comeback in Monday Night Football history. The 35 points scored after halftime tied the highest number of points that the Broncos scored in the second half, and also marked the first time in NFL history that a team won a game by double digits after trailing by at least 24 points at halftime.
- Season: The Broncos set a franchise record for scoring 30 or more points in 11 games, which was surpassed during the 2013 season.

=== Peyton Manning ===
- Week 1: Became the third quarterback in NFL history to achieve 400 career touchdown passes (joining Dan Marino and Brett Favre), as well as the fastest quarterback to achieve that feat.
- Week 3: Became the NFL's all-time leader in 300-yard passing games.
- Week 8: Set a new personal record for consecutive 300-yard passing games.
- Week 9: Surpassed Dan Marino for the NFL's all-time lead in game-winning drives in the fourth quarter or overtime.
- Week 11: Surpassed Dan Marino for second-place on the NFL's all-time list for touchdown passes.
- Week 12: Surpassed John Elway for second-place on the NFL's all-time list for regular-season wins by a quarterback.
- Week 13: Surpassed Dan Marino for second-place on the NFL's all-time pass completions list and set a franchise record for touchdown passes in a single season, which Manning surpassed in 2013.
- Week 14: Became the second quarterback in NFL history to achieve 5,000 career pass completions (joining Brett Favre), as well as the fastest quarterback to achieve that feat. He also achieved his NFL-record 12th season with at least 10 wins during a regular season.
- Week 17: Set a new single-season franchise record for pass completions; surpassed Brett Favre on the NFL's all-time list for games with three or more touchdown passes and set a new NFL record with a .707 pass completion percentage in games played during the month of December.
- Overall, Manning set new Broncos' single-season franchise records in pass completion percentage (.686), pass completions (400), passer rating (105.9), passing yardage (4,659) and touchdown passes (37), the latter four of which Manning surpassed in 2013. He was also named to the AFC Pro Bowl for the 12th time in his career, the most by a quarterback in NFL history.

=== Other players ===
- Britton Colquitt: Set a new single-season franchise record for net punting, with an average of 42.1 net yards per punt. Colquitt surpassed his own record that he previously set during the 2011 season.
- Chris Harris, Jr.: During the team's Week 15 win over the Baltimore Ravens, Harris returned a 98-yard interception for a touchdown, which, at the time, set a new record for the longest interception return in Broncos' franchise history, until Aqib Talib surpassed that record with a 103-yard return in 2017.
- Trindon Holliday:
  - Week 9: 105-yard kickoff return for a touchdown set a new record for the longest play in Broncos' franchise history, which Holliday tied in 2013.
  - Divisional playoffs: 90-yard punt return for a touchdown set a new record for the longest punt return in NFL playoff history, which was also the first punt return for a touchdown in Broncos' postseason history; became the first player in NFL history to return both a punt and a kickoff for a touchdown in a playoff game.
- Von Miller: Set a new Broncos' franchise record for quarterback sacks in a single season, during the team's Week 16 win over the Cleveland Browns. Miller finished the season with 18.5 sacks.
- Mitch Unrein: Became the first defensive lineman in Broncos' franchise history to catch a touchdown pass, during the team's Week 13 win over the Tampa Bay Buccaneers.

== Awards and honors ==
Recipient	Award(s)
Champ Bailey	Named to the USA Football All Fundamentals Team
Zane Beadles	Named as the team's Walter Payton Man of the Year
Ryan Clady	Named to the USA Football All Fundamentals Team
Trindon Holliday	Week 9: AFC Special Teams Player of the Week
Peyton Manning	Week 6: AFC Offensive Player of the Week; October: AFC Offensive Player of the Month; Week 17: AFC Offensive Player of the Week; December: AFC Offensive Player of the Month; Colorado Sports Hall of Fame Athlete of the Year; 2012 season: AFC Offensive Player of the Year; 2012 season: FedEx Air Player of the Year; 2012 season: Associated Press Comeback Player of the Year
Von Miller	Week 11: AFC Defensive Player of the Week; November: AFC Defensive Player of the Month; Voted to NFL.com's All-Under-25 Team
Knowshon Moreno	Week 15: AFC Offensive Player of the Week, FedEx Ground Player of the Week
Tracy Porter	Week 1: AFC Defensive Player of the Week
Matt Prater	Week 4: AFC Special Teams Player of the Week
Brandon Stokley	2012 season: DISH Unbeatable Value Player of the Year
Wesley Woodyard	Week 8: AFC Defensive Player of the Week; Voted to USA Today's All-Joe Team
Team	Week 6: GMC Never Say Never Moment of the Week (come-from-behind win)

=== Pro Bowl and All-Pro selections ===
Seven Broncos were elected to the 2013 Pro Bowl. Cornerback Champ Bailey, quarterback Peyton Manning and linebacker Von Miller were named as starters, while offensive tackle Ryan Clady and defensive end Elvis Dumervil were named as reserves. Guard Zane Beadles and wide receiver Demaryius Thomas were later added to the game as injury replacements. Clady and Miller, however, each withdrew from the game due to injuries.

Clady, Manning and Miller were also voted to the 2012 All-Pro First Team, while Bailey was named to the Second Team.

== Other news and notes ==
- The Broncos switched their primary home jersey color from navy blue to orange. The orange jerseys that served as the team's alternate colored jersey from 2002 to 2011 became the primary home jersey, while the navy blue jerseys that served as the team's primary home jersey from 1997 to 2011 switched to alternate designation. The change was made due to overwhelming popularity with fans, who clamored for the team to return to wearing orange at home, which was the team's predominant home jersey color from 1962 to 1996.
- On April 3, the Broncos, along with each of the other 31 NFL teams, unveiled the team's new uniforms for the 2012 season, with Nike replacing Reebok as the NFL's merchandising dealer. With the exceptions of a few tweaks (including the neckline), the team's uniform designs remained the same as the previous seasons.
- On July 31, former Broncos' wide receiver Ed McCaffrey, who played with the Broncos from 1995 to 2003, was announced as the team's new color commentator alongside play-by-play announcer Dave Logan on the team's radio network, 850 KOA (AM). McCaffrey replaced Brian Griese, the station's color commentator for the previous two seasons, who took on expanded duties with ESPN's college football coverage.
- The Broncos set a new single-season franchise record for home attendance with 613,062 fans, surpassing the previous record of 612,893 that was set in 2007.
