= Chris Clark (American football) =

American football player (born 1985)

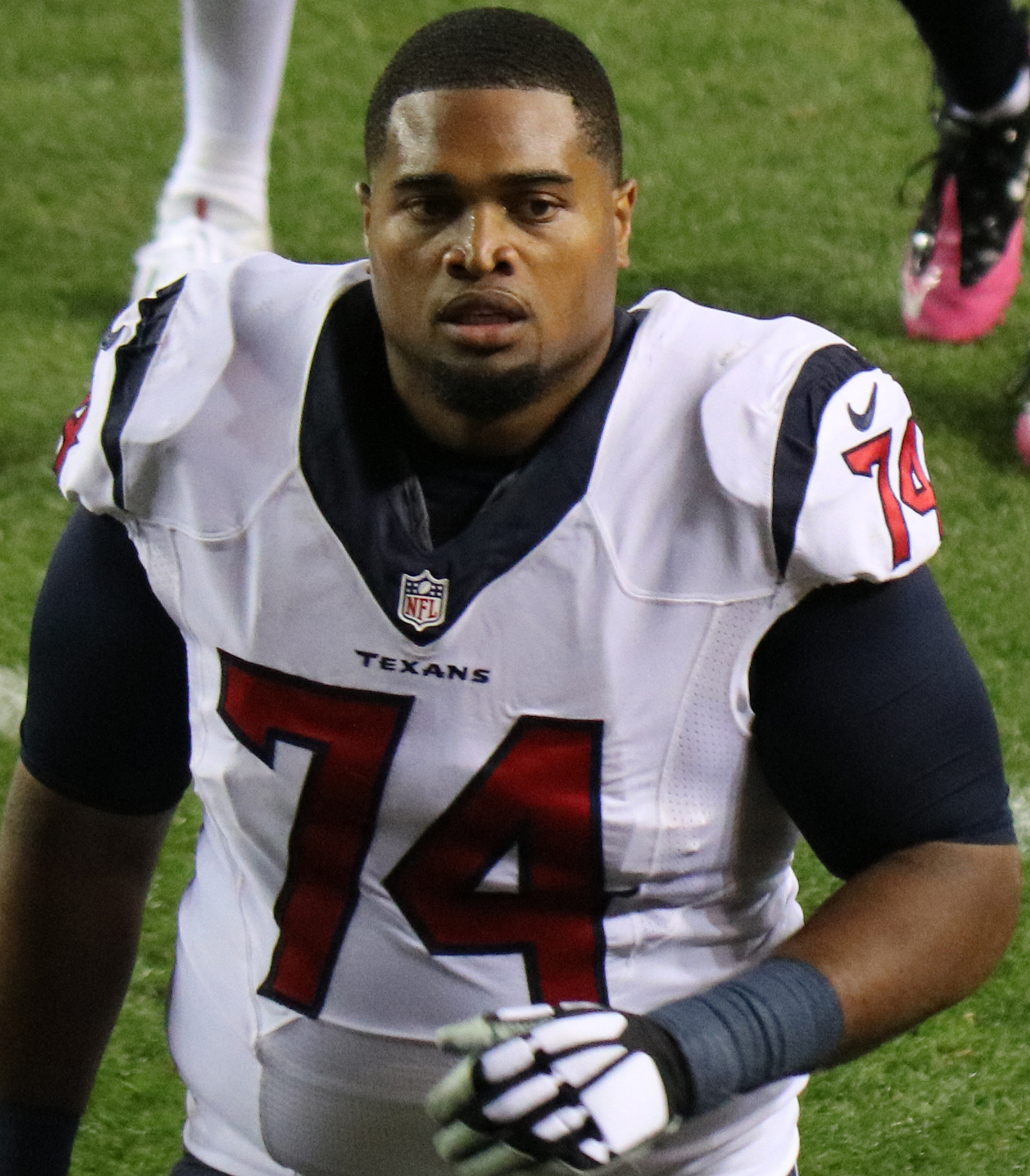
- Clark with the Houston Texans in 2016

No. 68, 75, 74, 79, 77
- Position: Offensive tackle

Personal information
- Born: October 1, 1985 (age 41); New Orleans, Louisiana, U.S.
- Listed height: 6 ft 5 in (1.96 m)
- Listed weight: 315 lb (143 kg)

Career information
- High school: McDonogh 35 (New Orleans)
- College: Southern Miss
- NFL draft: 2008: undrafted

Career history
- Tampa Bay Buccaneers (2008)*; Minnesota Vikings (2008–2010)*; Denver Broncos (2010–2014); Houston Texans (2015–2017); Carolina Panthers (2018); New Orleans Saints (2019)*; Houston Texans (2019)
- * Offseason or practice squad member only

Career NFL statistics
- Games played: 129
- Games started: 73
- Stats at Pro Football Reference

Christopher Lee Clark (born October 1, 1985) is an American former professional football player who was an offensive tackle in the National Football League (NFL). He played college football for the Southern Miss Golden Eagles and was signed by the Tampa Bay Buccaneers as an undrafted free agent in 2008.

== Professional career ==
=== Tampa Bay Buccaneers ===
Clark was signed by the Buccaneers as an undrafted free agent in 2008. He was released by the Buccaneers at the end of the preseason.

=== Minnesota Vikings ===
On September 10, 2008. Clark was signed to the Vikings' practice squad where he spent two years on the practice squad before being waived on September 4, 2010, during final cuts prior to the beginning of the 2010 NFL season.

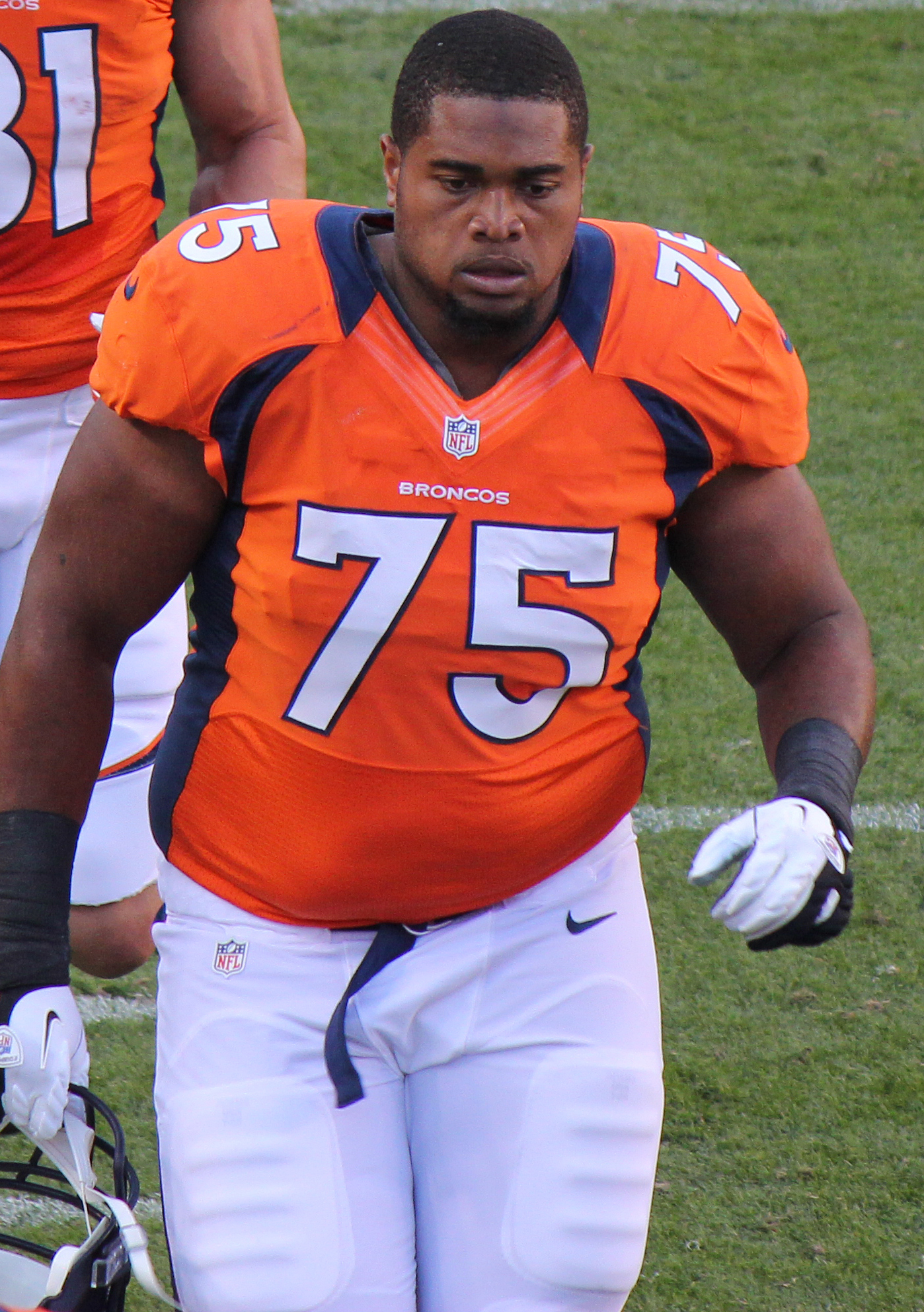
Clark with the Broncos in 2012

=== Denver Broncos ===
On September 5, 2010, Clark was claimed off waivers by the Denver Broncos where he appeared in 69 regular-season games (27 starts) over five seasons with the Broncos.

=== Houston Texans (first stint) ===
On August 31, 2015, Clark was traded to the Houston Texans for a seventh-round pick in the 2016 NFL draft.

On November 29, 2017, Clark was placed on injured reserve.

=== Carolina Panthers ===
On September 12, 2018, Clark was signed by the Carolina Panthers following injuries to Matt Kalil and Daryl Williams. He became their starting left tackle, starting 13 games.

=== New Orleans Saints ===
On August 12, 2019, Clark was signed by the New Orleans Saints. He was placed on injured reserve on August 21, 2019. He was released with an injury settlement on August 26.

=== Houston Texans (second stint) ===
On October 16, 2019, Clark was signed by the Houston Texans. He started seven games, six at right tackle and one at left.
