= Ben McLaughlin =

American football player (born 1986)

Current position
- Title: Head coach
- Team: Louisiana Christian
- Conference: SAC
- Record: 12–10

Biographical details
- Born: September 22, 1986 (age 40); Dierks, Arkansas, U.S.

Playing career
- 2005: Henderson State
- 2006–2007: Louisiana College
- 2009–2010: Louisiana College
- 2011: IFAF Team USA
- 2011: Louisiana Swashbucklers
- Position: Quarterback

Coaching career (HC unless noted)
- 2011–2012: Louisiana College (RB)
- 2013: Northeastern Oklahoma A&M (QB)
- 2014–2015: Northeastern Oklahoma A&M (OC)
- 2016–2018: Louisiana College (OC/QB)
- 2019–2021: Alexandria HS (LA) (OC)
- 2022–2023: Buckeye HS (LA)
- 2024–present: Louisiana Christian

Head coaching record
- Overall: 12–10 (college); 8–13 (high school)

Accomplishments and honors

Awards
- Louisiana Christian University Athletic Hall of Fame; Melberger Award recipient AP Little All-American; LSWA Offensive Player of the Year; 2x ASC Offensive Player of the Year; IFAF Gold Medalist; D3Football.com All-South Region First Team; 2025 SAC Coach of the Year

Ben McLaughlin
Medal record

Men's American football

Representing United States

World Championship
| Gold medal – first place | 2011 Austria | Team competition |

Benjamin McLaughlin (born September 22, 1986) is an American college football coach and former quarterback. He is the head football coach for Louisiana Christian University, a position he has held since 2024. He was the head football coach for Buckeye High School from 2022 to 2023. He played college football for Louisiana College—now known as Louisiana Christian—and is a hall of fame inductee. He also played for the Louisiana Swashbucklers of the Southern Indoor Football League (SIFL) and the United States national American football team where they won 2011 gold medal.

== High school career ==
McLaughlin was the starting quarterback for Dierks High School. He was a two-time All-state football player, and a three-sport athlete. In 2002, he became the starter during his sophomore year. He led his team to an undefeated regular season in 2004—with their only loss coming in the Arkansas state playoffs to finish with an 11–1 season record.

== College career ==
=== Henderson State ===
McLaughlin redshirted for 2005 while attending Henderson State University. He transferred the next year to Louisiana College—now known as Louisiana Christian University—in Pineville, Louisiana.

=== Louisiana College ===
In 2006, as a redshirt freshman at Louisiana College, McLaughlin became starting quarterback. He finished the year leading the American Southwest Conference (ASC) in passing offense, averaging 276 yards through the air. McLaughlin ranked second in the ASC and 12th nationally in total offense per game. He completed 185-of-316 passes with 21 touchdowns and only seven interceptions. McLaughlin was named the American Southwest Conference freshman of the year.

In 2007, McLaughlin led an offense that finished the season ranked fifth for NCAA Division III offenses, averaging 325.7 yards per game. He ranked eighth nationally in passing offense per game, averaging 297.8 yards per game. McLaughlin threw for a total of 2,978 yards and 21 touchdowns. He also ranked 12th nationally in the category of total offense.

In 2008, McLaughlin received a year-long suspension for violating team rules. He subsequently left the team.

In 2009, McLaughlin returned to Louisiana College. In his first game back he started the season completing a 56-yard touchdown pass for the team's first score of the season. During his redshirt junior season, he established new career-passing yards, total touchdowns, and passing touchdowns records. He was named to the Academic All-Conference team.

In 2010, McLaughlin remained the starter. Following a 49–21 win over East Texas Baptist, he was named ASC Offensive Player of the Week. He went 30-for-36 for 391 yards and four touchdowns, and ran for two more scores. He also ran one touchdown in and accounted for all but one of Louisiana College's seven touchdowns. The following week, he needed 77 yards to become the ASC's career passing leader. He threw for 491-yard and six-touchdown performance in the 62–28 win. Following the game, he was named to the D3football.com Team of the Week. McLaughlin finished the year leading all divisions of football with 3,770 yards passing and 42 touchdown passes. He also had four rushing touchdowns. The team finished 7–3 overall and a program-record 7–1 in their conference.

Following the season McLaughlin was named the ASC Offensive Player of the Year. He also made his second Academic All-Conference team. He was named as a Gagliardi Trophy finalist. He was named to the 2010 D3Football.com All-South Region Team as the First-Team quarterback. McLaughlin was named to the 2010 Little All-America Team, by the Associated Press. He was named to the All-Louisiana College Football team by the Louisiana Sports Writers Association as First-Team quarterback and was named the Offensive Player of the Year. He was selected as the NCAA Division III Player of the Year when he was chosen as the recipient of the Melberger Award. In June, he was named the ASC Male Athlete of the Year, which encompasses all sports.

McLaughlin was selected unanimously during his first year of eligibility to be inducted into the Louisiana College Sports Hall of Fame. Athletic director and head coach Dennis Dunn, recognized McLaughlin on his accomplishments at the 2015 Hall of Fame brunch as part of homecoming weekend activities on October 2, 2015.

=== Statistics ===
| | | Passing | | | | | | |
| Season | G | Att | Com | Int | Pct. | Yds | TD | Efficiency |
|---|---|---|---|---|---|---|---|---|
| 2006 | 9 | 316 | 185 | 7 | 58.5 | 2484 | 21 | 142.1 |
| 2007 | 10 | 375 | 234 | 15 | 62.2 | 2978 | 21 | 139.2 |
| 2009 | 10 | 361 | 228 | 10 | 63.2 | 2823 | 27 | 148.0 |
| 2010 | 10 | 446 | 284 | 13 | 63.7 | 3770 | 42 | 159.9 |
| Totals | 39 | 1498 | 931 | 45 | 62.1 | 12,055 | 111 | 148.2 |

== Professional career ==
=== Louisiana Swashbucklers ===
In 2011 McLaughlin had been signed to play for the Louisiana Swashbucklers of the Southern Indoor Football League (SIFL). Ben guided the Swashbucklers to the playoffs where they lost to the Albany Panthers in the 2011 SIFL Championship Game. However, Ben had to leave the team prior to the championship game in order to join Team USA in Europe for the gold medal games.

==== Statistics ====
| | | Passing | | | | | | |
| Season | G | Att | Com | Int | Pct. | Yds | TD | Efficiency |
|---|---|---|---|---|---|---|---|---|
| 2011 | 10 | 319 | 204 | 12 | 63.9 | 2265 | 50 | 108.5 |

=== Team USA ===
In 2011, McLaughlin accepted an offer to play for the US national team for the 2011 IFAF World Cup. The team went undefeated with wins over Canada, Mexico, Germany, and Australia. Ben's 64-yard TD pass in the game vs. Australia was the longest passing TD for the American team during the games. On July 16, 2011, the American team won the gold medal on Tivoli Field in Innsbruck, Austria, by defeating Canada 50–7.

==== Statistics ====
| | | Passing | | | | | | |
| Year | # | Att | Com | Int | Pct. | Yds | TD | Efficiency |
|---|---|---|---|---|---|---|---|---|
| 2011 | 13 | 14 | 12 | 0 | 85.7 | 153 | 1 | 201.1 |

== Coaching career ==
In 2011, following McLaughlin's retired he became the running backs coach at his alma mater, Louisiana College.

In 2013, McLaughlin joined Northeastern Oklahoma A&M College (NEO) as the quarterbacks coach. He was promoted to offensive coordinator at NEO for the 2014 season.

In 2016, McLaughlin rejoined Louisiana College as the offensive coordinator and quarterbacks coach.

In 2019, McLaughlin joined Alexandria Senior High School offensive coordinator and quarterbacks coach in Alexandria, Louisiana. He helped lead them to a Class 5A State Runner-Up finish in 2020.

In 2022, McLaughlin was hired as the head football coach for Buckeye High School in Deville, Louisiana.

Ben has also served as the head coach for the Dream Bowl. His first year as head coach was for Dream Bowl V, played on Monday January 16, 2017. It was highest scoring contest in the game's six-year history. Ben returned to coach the annual event and was the winning coach for Dream Bowl VI.

On February 22, 2024, McLaughlin returned to his alma mater—now known as Louisiana Christian—as the head football coach.

In his second season as head coach of his alma mater in 2025, McLaughlin led the team to their second conference title in program history and second in three seasons. They split the title with Texas Wesleyan and Ottawa (Ariz.) after upsetting Ottawa, then ranked #11 nationally, 48-13 in the season finale. Due to tiebreakers, LCU did not receive a bid to the NAIA playoffs.

McLaughlin was named the Sooner Athletic Conference Coach of the Year for the 2025 season and he and his staff were selected to coach in the Dream Bowl.

Building upon the success in his second season, McLaughlin led the Wildcats to an undefeated Sooner Athletic Conference championship in 2026, going a perfect 8-0 in conference play and finishing the regular season with a 10-1 record. Louisiana Christian advanced to the NAIA playoffs for just the second time in school history, earning a No. 15 seed in the 20-team bracket.

== Personal life ==
McLaughlin is married to Meagan and have two daughters. They currently reside in Alexandria, Louisiana. In 2012, Ben was diagnosed with having had Type 1 diabetes. McLaughlin is the youngest of two brothers.

== Head coaching record ==
=== College ===
| Year | Team | Overall | Conference | Standing | Bowl/playoffs |
|---|---|---|---|---|---|
Louisiana Christian Wildcats (Sooner Athletic Conference) (2024–present)
| 2024 | Louisiana Christian | 4–7 | 3–5 | T–6th | |
| 2025 | Louisiana Christian | 8–3 | 7–1 | T–1st | |
| 2026 | Louisiana Christian | 10-1 | 8–0 | 1st | |
| Louisiana Christian: | | 22–11 | 18–6 | | |
| Total: | | 22–11 | | | |

=== High school ===
| Year | Team | Overall | Conference | Standing | Bowl/playoffs |
|---|---|---|---|---|---|
Buckeye Panthers (Louisiana High School Athletic Association) (2022–2023)
| 2022 | Buckeye | 3–7 | 1–3 | 4th | |
| 2023 | Buckeye | 5–6 | 2–3 | 5th | First Round |
| Buckeye: | | 8–13 | 3–6 | | |
| Total: | | 8–13 | | | |
