= List of Northwestern State Demons in the NFL draft =

This is a list of Northwestern State Demons football players in the NFL draft.

== Key ==
B	Back	K	Kicker	NT	Nose tackle
C	Center	LB	Linebacker	FB	Fullback
DB	Defensive back	P	Punter	HB	Halfback
DE	Defensive end	QB	Quarterback	WR	Wide receiver
DT	Defensive tackle	RB	Running back	G	Guard
E	End	T	Offensive tackle	TE	Tight end

== Selections ==
Year	Round	Pick	Overall	Player	Team	Position
1955	4	5	42	Fred Broussard	Pittsburgh Steelers	C
1958	25	1	290	J. C. Riekenberg	Chicago Cardinals	B
1959	27	7	319	Charlie Tolar	Pittsburgh Steelers	B
1962	18	6	244	Ferrell Yarbrough	Pittsburgh Steelers	T
1963	10	3	129	Jackie Smith	St. Louis Cardinals	TE
1964	7	11	95	Sammy Odom	Cleveland Browns	LB
1964	9	7	119	Jerry Burton	Los Angeles Rams	B
1964	12	3	157	Johnny Norman	Dallas Cowboys	E
1965	6	13	83	Corwyn Aldredge	Cleveland Browns	WR
1966	10	13	153	Monte Ledbetter	Cleveland Browns	WR
1966	11	6	161	Dick Reding	Washington Redskins	WR
1967	4	10	90	Al Dodd	Chicago Bears	DB
1968	15	12	393	Dave Lovich	St. Louis Cardinals	DE
1968	16	12	420	Phil Creel	Philadelphia Eagles	T
1969	10	17	251	David Arnold	San Diego Chargers	G
1974	12	12	298	Randy Walker	Green Bay Packers	K
1975	8	10	192	Mario Cage	Baltimore Colts	RB
1975	11	23	283	John Dilworth	Miami Dolphins	DB
1976	14	1	376	Jarvis Blinks	Seattle Seahawks	DB
1977	2	20	48	Sidney Thornton	Pittsburgh Steelers	RB
1979	2	20	48	Petey Perot	Philadelphia Eagles	G
1979	12	27	330	Mike Almond	Pittsburgh Steelers	WR
1981	2	13	41	Joe Delaney	Kansas City Chiefs	RB
1982	2	25	52	Mark Duper	Miami Dolphins	WR
1982	9	27	250	James Bennett	Cincinnati Bengals	WR
1983	6	7	147	Victor Oatis	Philadelphia Eagles	WR
1984	4	21	105	Gary Reasons	New York Giants	LB
1987	4	28	112	Odessa Turner	New York Giants	WR
1988	1	17	17	John Stephens	New England Patriots	RB
1989	6	20	159	Floyd Turner	New Orleans Saints	WR
1990	6	20	157	Randy Hilliard	Cleveland Browns	DB
1990	11	16	292	Al Edwards	Buffalo Bills	WR
1993	2	19	48	Adrian Hardy	San Francisco 49ers	DB
1994	2	10	39	Marcus Spears	Chicago Bears	T
1997	5	10	140	Keith Thibodeaux	Washington Redskins	DB
1998	6	17	170	Pat Palmer	Washington Redskins	WR
1999	4	25	120	Kenny Wright	Minnesota Vikings	DB
1999	5	29	162	Jermaine Jones	New York Jets	DB
1999	6	6	175	Robert Daniel	Carolina Panthers	DE
2000	7	48	254	Mike Green	Chicago Bears	DB
2002	5	29	164	Craig Nall	Green Bay Packers	QB
2003	4	14	111	Terrence McGee	Buffalo Bills	DB
2006	3	23	87	David Pittman	Baltimore Ravens	DB
2008	7	12	219	Demetress Bell	Buffalo Bills	T
2012	6	2	172	Jeremy Lane	Seattle Seahawks	DB
2015	7	6	223	Deon Simon	New York Jets	DT

== Notable undrafted players ==
Note: No drafts held before 1920

Debut year	Player name	Position	Debut NFL/AFL team	Notes
1960	Charlie Hennigan	WR	Houston Oilers	
1970	Vic Nyvall	RB	New Orleans Saints	
1986	Robert Moore	S	Atlanta Falcons	
1987	James Hall	LB	San Diego Chargers	
1989	Paul Frazier	RB	New Orleans Saints	
1999	Ronnie Powell	WR	Cleveland Browns	
2005	Jamall Johnson	LB	Cleveland Browns	
2007	Tory Collins	DT	Chicago Bears	
2009	Dudley Guice Jr.	WR	Tennessee Titans	
2010	Isaiah Greenhouse	FB/LB	Houston Texans	
2015	Imoan Claiborne	CB	St. Louis Rams	
2016	Ed Eagan	WR	Dallas Cowboys	
2016	Pace Murphy	OT	Los Angeles Rams	
2019	Jazz Ferguson	WR	Seattle Seahawks	
