= Kellie & Kristen =

American Christian gospel music duo

- Origin: Alexandria, Louisiana
- Genres: Worship, Christian pop, gospel
- Years active: 2014–present
- Members: Kellie Nicole Fuselier; Kristen Michelle Fuselier
- Website: kellieandkristen.com

Kellie & Kristen are an American female twin-sister Christian worship and gospel music duo of Kellie Nicole Fuselier and Kristen Michelle Fuselier, coming from Alexandria, Louisiana. They started as a duo in 2014, while their first extended play, We Receive, was released in 2016.

== Background ==
The twin-sister duo are from Alexandria, Louisiana, where they both graduated from Alexandria Senior High School, in 2007, while Kellie Nicole Fuselier became a Licensed Master of Social Work and Kristen Michelle Fuselier obtained a degree in Christian Studies. They were born on January 17, 1989. They both currently work and reside in Nashville, TN.

== Music history ==
The group started in 2014, with their first extended play, We Receive, that released on January 15, 2016, two days before the duo's 27 birthdays.

== Members ==
- Kellie Nicole Fuselier (born January 17, 1989)
- Kristen Michelle Fuselier (born January 17, 1989)

== Touring Members ==
- Johnny Miller, V (guitars)

== Discography ==
EPs

- We Receive (January 15, 2016)
