= Errol Barron =

American architect and educator (born 1941)

Cedric Errol Barron Jr.
- Born: December 31, 1941 (age 84); Alexandria, Louisiana, US
- Occupations: Architect, artist, educator
- Organization: American Institute of Architects

Cedric Errol Barron Jr. (born December 31, 1941) is an American architect, artist, and educator. A founding partner of Errol Barron/Michael Toups Architects, he is professor of architecture at Tulane University. In 1994, he was made a fellow of the American Institute of Architects with supporting letters from Charles Moore, Paul Rudolph, and Jean Paul Carlhian and in 2012 was awarded the Gold Medal for Architecture by the American Institute of Architects, Louisiana, for his "significant and enduring contribution to the advancement of architecture and his inspiring influence on the architects of Louisiana."

He is the author of four books: Observation: Sketchbooks, Paintings and Architecture of Errol Barron; New Orleans Observed: Drawings and Observations of America's Most Foreign City; Roma Osservata/Rome Observed; and A Tradition of Serenity: The Tropical Houses of Ong-Ard Satrabhandhu. He is also a musician and published a CD: L'Amateur.

== Early life and education ==
Born in Alexandria, Louisiana, December 31, 1941, he is the son of Cedric Errol Barron, founder of the architectural firm Barron, Heinberg, and Brocato of Alexandria in 1945. He grew up in Alexandria and graduated from Bolton High School. Barron received his B. Arch from Tulane University, in 1964, where he received the Henry Adams Award; his M. Arch from Yale University in 1967; and an M. Arch from Tulane in 2004. He also studied at the Architectural Association in London, England. He returned to Alexandria after he graduated from Tulane University and lived there until he left to pursue graduate studies at Yale University. He lived in New York City from 1967–1974, in London from 1974–1975, and in New Orleans from 1976 to the present.

== Career ==
Barron began his architectural career at Barron, Heinberg and Brocato until 1966 when he left to attend Yale University. After graduating he worked for Paul Rudolph (1967–1974) for whom he was the lead design staff architect for such projects as the Burroughs Wellcome Pharmaceutical Headquarters in the Research Triangle Park in North Carolina and the Bass House in Ft Worth, Texas. His first independent commission was the Kaiser House in Greece, published in Architectural Digest, June 1979. After moving to New Orleans from England, where he had taught for a year, his first project was the Stafford House, which was designated a Record House of 1980 by Architectural Record (May 1980). In 1983, he and F. Michael Toups formed the architectural firm Errol Barron/Michael Toups. They closed the firm in 2016 having produced many award winning buildings (thirty-six local and national awards) including the Ogden Museum of Southern Art in New Orleans and the St. James Church in Fairhope, Alabama, which received a national AIA award for religious architecture.

Barron has pursued a career teaching architecture alongside his professional career as an architect and became a full professor. He taught at Kingston University, England, (1974/75) and Tulane University (1976–?) where he was named a Favrot Professor and the Richard Koch Professor of Architecture. In 2015, students awarded him the Malcolm Heard Teaching Award. He has lectured on his work at the University of California, Berkeley, University of Iowa, Drury University, University of Miami (Florida), University of Glasgow, University of Puerto Rico, the Polytechnic of San Juan, University of Texas, Arlington, Louisiana State University, and the University of Tennessee, Knoxville.

Barron is also a contemporary American landscape painter. He has exhibited his paintings, drawings, and photographs in galleries, universities and museums throughout the U.S. since 1984. In 1995, he was awarded the Gabriel Prize by the Western European Architecture Foundation to study in France. Under the auspices of George Parker, the founder of the WEAF, he returned to France in 1996 and 1997 to extend his studies. The drawings and paintings produced in France were published in Observation: Sketchbooks, Paintings and Architecture of Errol Barron. His work is included in the collections of the Alexandria Museum of Art; Ogden Museum of Southern Art; University of Tennessee, Knoxville, School of Architecture; Bakersfield Museum of Art, and over 42 private collections.

== Buildings (selected) ==
- The Ogden Museum of Southern Art, New Orleans, Louisiana
- Residence of Mrs. Henry J. Kaiser, Greece
- Turner's Hall, renovation and adaptation, New Orleans, Louisiana
- 643 Magazine Street, New Orleans, Louisiana
- Salvation Army Center of Hope Shelter, New Orleans, Louisiana
- Stafford House, New Orleans, Louisiana
- Office Building Baton Rouge, Louisiana
- Weinstein Residence, North Salem, New York
- St. James, Fairhope, Alabama
- Oliver St. Pé Center, University of New Orleans, New Orleans, Louisiana
- Vardinoyannis Residence, Athens, Greece

== Publications ==
- Observation: Sketchbooks, Paintings and Architecture of Errol Barron
- New Orleans Observed: Drawings and Observations of America's Most Foreign City
- Roma Osservata/Rome Observed
- A Tradition of Serenity, the Architecture of Ongard Satrabhandhu

His work is included in

- Drawing/Thinking/Thinking/Drawing, edited by Marc Treib
- Gabriel: 25 Years of the Gabriel Prize
- Architects' Sketchbooks edited by Will Jones
- Architecture for the Gods and Architecture for the Gods: Book Two by Michael J. Crosbie

He co-authored with Jacob Brillhart Visual Thinking in the Digital Age: Drawing Practice/Two Generations.

== Awards (selected) ==
Historic Districts Landmarks Commission Honor Awards 1986–1992

- Timmons Residence
- 535 Julia Street
- McGlinchey, Stafford, Mintz, Cellini & Lang
- Turner's Hall
- F. Monroe Labouisse Award for Architectural Excellence 1988

New Orleans Magazine Best Architecture of the Year 2002, 2006, 2007, 2008, 2011

Southern Living Residential Awards Winner 2002

New Orleans Chapter AIA Honor Awards

- Weinstein Residence, 1987
- Offices of Mathews, Atkinson, Guglielmo, Marks and Day, 1987
- Offices of McGlinchey, Stafford, Mintz, Cellini & Lang, 1986

AIA Louisiana Honor Awards

- Stafford House, 1980
- McGlinchey, Stafford, Mintz, Cellini, and Lang 1984
- F. Patrick Taylor Foundation Headquarters, 1991
- Offices of Mathews, Atkinson, Guglielmo, Marks, and Day, 1987
- St. James Episcopal Church, Fairhope, Alabama, 1994

Gulf States Regional AIA Honor Awards

- Offices of Mathew, Atkinson, Guglielmo, Marks and Day, 1988
- Patrick F. Taylor Foundation Headquarters, 1993

AIA National Award of Excellence, St. James Church, Fairhope, Alabama, 1995

Fellow, American Institute of Architects, 1994

American Institute of Architects, Louisiana, Gold Medal of Honor, 2012
