= Kiael Kelly =

- Kelly with Ball State in 2025

No. 0 – San Diego Strike Force
- Position: Quarterback
- Roster status: Active

Personal information
- Born: Tampa, Florida, U.S.
- Listed height: 6 ft 1 in (1.85 m)
- Listed weight: 195 lb (88 kg)

Career information
- High school: Tampa Catholic (Tampa, Florida); Jesuit (Tampa, Florida); Gaither (Tampa, Florida)
- College: Ball State (2021–2025)
- NFL draft: 2026: undrafted

Career history
- San Diego Strike Force (2025–present)

Kiael Kelly (pronounced ky-ELL) is an American football quarterback for the San Diego Strike Force of the Indoor Football League (IFL). He played college football for the Ball State Cardinals.

== Early life ==
Kelly was one of five children born in Tampa, Florida. In high school, Kelly was a three-sport athlete playing baseball, basketball and football. He first played football at Tampa Catholic High School before transferring to Jesuit High School. With the Jesuit Tigers team, Kelly recorded 97 completions, 168 attempts for 1,425 yards, 18 touchdowns and two interceptions during the 2019 season. Kelly later transferred to Gaither High where he led the Gaither Cowboys team twice to the semifinals. Kelly's junior year saw him serve as team captain. During his senior year, Kelly and the Gaither Cowboys enjoyed an undefeated 11–0 record. Kelly's performances earned him all-state and all-conference selections. He finished his high school career with an excess total of 5,000 passing yards with 60 passing touchdowns and 21 rushing touchdowns. An honor roll student and four-year letterwinner, Kelly was rated as a three-star recruiting prospect heading towards his collegiate career.

== College career ==
After an absent redshirt season in 2021, Kelly joined the Ball State Cardinals in 2022. He finished his only game of the 2022 season with one completed pass for 23 yards and carrying eight times for 83 yards. During his sophomore season in 2023 Kelly played both quarterback and wide receiver positions. After placing third-string in the quarterback succession behind veteran player Layne Hatcher and freshman Kadin Semonza, Kelly became a starting player during Week 7 of the 2023 season. He went on to play in 7 starting lineups including the season opening game against Kentucky. During his junior season in 2024, Kelly appeared in multiple positions including quarterback, halfback, slot receiver, running back and wide receiver during 11 of 12 games. Citing a string of factors including Ball State's loss to Bowling Green, his own lack of in-game use and change of head coaches from Mike Neu to Mike Uremovich, Kelly opted to enter the transfer portal. He entered the transfer portal on November 24 before it was announced on December 19 that Kelly re-committed to Ball State for his final season. He finished his senior season in 2025 with season totals recorded at 154 completed passes, 1,583 yards and 11 touchdowns. Kelly was invited to play quarterback in the 2026 Dream Bowl, following in the footsteps of Ball State quarterback standouts Keith Wenning of the 2014 East–West Shrine Bowl and Drew Plitt of the 2021 Camellia Bowl.

=== Statistics ===
| Year | Team | Games | | | Passing | | | | | | | | Rushing | | | |
| Year | Team | GP | GS | Record (Note: Accounts for only GS as a QB. On 9/2/23 and 10/5/24 Kelly started at WR.) | Cmp | Att | Pct | Yds | Y/A | TD | Int | Rtg | Att | Yds | Avg | TD |
|---|---|---|---|---|---|---|---|---|---|---|---|---|---|---|---|---|
| 2021 | Ball State | 0 | 0 | — | Redshirted (redshirt) | | | | | | | | | | | |
| 2022 | Ball State | 1 | 0 | — | 1 | 1 | 100.0 | 23 | 23.0 | 0 | 0 | 293.2 | 8 | 83 | 10.4 | 0 |
| 2023 | Ball State | 12 | 7 | 3–3 | 66 | 124 | 53.2 | 577 | 4.7 | 2 | 3 | 92.8 | 135 | 724 | 5.4 | 7 |
| 2024 | Ball State | 11 | 2 | 1–0 | 2 | 4 | 50.0 | 8 | 2.0 | 0 | 0 | 66.8 | 35 | 91 | 2.6 | 1 |
| 2025 | Ball State | 12 | 12 | 4–8 | 154 | 273 | 56.4 | 1,583 | 5.8 | 11 | 8 | 112.6 | 211 | 600 | 2.8 | 5 |
| Career | | 36 | 21 | 8−11 | 223 | 402 | 55.5 | 2,191 | 5.5 | 13 | 11 | 106.5 | 389 | 1,498 | 3.9 | 13 |

== Professional career ==
Kelly signed with the San Diego Strike Force of the Indoor Football League (IFL) for the 2025 season.

Following his IFL debut, Kelly entered the 2026 NFL Draft.

On August 25, 2026, the San Diego Strike Force re-signed Kelly for the 2026 season.

== Personal life ==
Kelly has two brothers and two sisters. His father Kenny was a college quarterback for the Miami Hurricanes before playing two seasons as a professional outfielder for the Tampa Bay Rays. While at Ball State, Kelly sponsored a youth program called "Kelly's Krewe".
