= Buckeye High School =

Buckeye High School may refer to:

- Buckeye High School (Louisiana) - Buckeye, Louisiana
- Buckeye High School (Ohio) - York Township, Ohio
- Buckeye Union High School in Buckeye, Arizona (sometimes, the Union is omitted)
