= Bolton Academy =

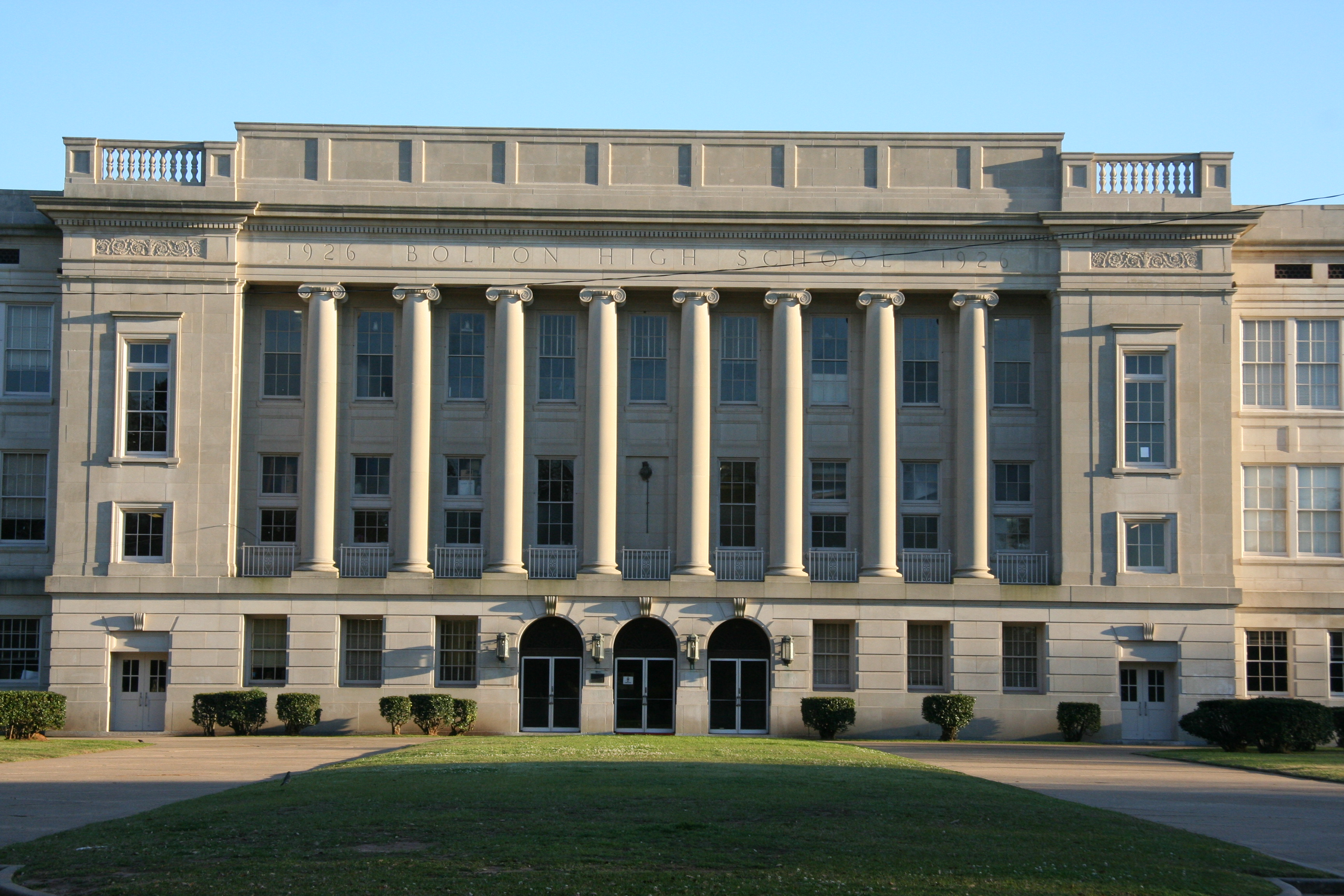
- Bolton High School in 2007

Location
- 2101 Vance Avenue; Alexandria, Rapides Parish, Louisiana 71301; United States

Information
- Established: 1915
- School district: Rapides Parish School Board
- Superintendent: Jeff Powell
- Principal: Alex Goodling
- Assistant Principal: Hayley Dean
- Teaching staff: 53.34 (FTE)
- Grades: pre-K – 12
- Enrollment: 561, grades 9–12 (2023–2024)
- Student to teacher ratio: 10.52
- Colors: Royal blue and white
- Mascot: Bears
- Yearbook: Bruin
- Website: boltonacademy.rpsb.us

Bolton Academy Academic & Performing Arts Magnet School (formerly Bolton High School) is a public magnet school in Alexandria, Rapides Parish, Louisiana, United States. The school's neoclassical building is listed on the National Register of Historic Places. It is a part of the Rapides Parish School Board.

== History ==
=== 1915 – 2024 ===
Bolton High School was originally segregated, and African American students attended Peabody Industrial School. Scott M. Brame became the school's principal in 1909.

Kewaunee Manufacturing of Kewaunee, Wisconsin advertised it was supplying furniture and equipment for the new school building in 1915. A photo of the school is featured in the advertisement.

- Bolton High School
- U.S. National Register of Historic Places
- Location within Louisiana
- Location: 2101 Vance Ave., Alexandria, Louisiana
- Coordinates: 31°17′36″N 92°27′20″W
- Area: 4.5 acres (1.8 ha)
- Built: 1926
- Architect: Favrot & Livaudais
- Architectural style: Classical Revival
- NRHP reference No.: 84001349
- Added to NRHP: January 9, 1984

The Bolton High School building at 2101 Vance Ave. was constructed in 1926. It is Classical Revival in style and was designed by New Orleans architects Favrot & Livaudais. It was listed on the National Register of Historic Places in 1984. According to its National Register nomination, the building "can be seen as the most urbane and sophisticated early-twentieth century building" in Rapides Parish.

The building is described as a "three story neo-classical masonry structure with limestone facing". Expansive front and rear sections of the building are separated by an open area but are connected by two corridors. The expansive rear section of the building included a large auditorium. A cafeteria was added in 1967. The front entrance lobby has an ornate design, but much of the interior was "relatively plain", emphasizing functionality over ornamentation.

In 1946, archery was added as an athletic program for girls at the school.

On November 7, 1957, a tornado three blocks away from the school caused a power failure during a performance of Madame Butterfly. The performance was canceled. Nobody was injured.

In 2019, a Career and Tech Center were added and a conservatory planned.

=== 2024 – present ===
In August 2023, the Rapides Parish School Board voted to transition Bolton High School into a magnet school.

Beginning with the 2024–25 academic year, Bolton High School became Bolton Academy Academic & Performing Arts Magnet School. During the first year, the school accepted students in grades 6 to 12, but the new magnet school now accommodates students from pre-kindergarten through grade 12.

== Athletics ==
Bolton High competes in the Louisiana High School Athletic Association (LHSAA).

== Notable alumni ==
- Errol Barron (b. 1941), architect and professor
- Daniel T. Barry (b. 1953), NASA astronaut
- Elliott Chaze (1915–1990), journalist and novelist
- Luther F. Cole (1925–2013), state politician and judge
- Catherine D. Kimball (b. 1945), Chief Justice of the Louisiana Supreme Court
- Maxie Lambright (1924–1980), football coach
- Gillis William Long (1923–1985), U.S. representative
- Harold B. McSween (1926–2002), U.S. representative
- Warren Morris (b. 1974), Major League Baseball player
- Vernon W. Pickett (1912–1944), US Army First Lieutenant that was killed in action during World War II, and the current namesake of Fort Pickett
- Ned Randolph (1942–2016), state politician
- Jock Scott (1947–2009), politician
- Mickey Slaughter (1941–2023), quarterback in the American Football League
- Randy Thom (b. 1951), winner of two Oscars, one British Academy Award, and one French Academy Award for film sound

== See also ==
- Alexandria, Louisiana
- National Register of Historic Places listings in Rapides Parish, Louisiana
