= List of Denver Broncos starting quarterbacks =

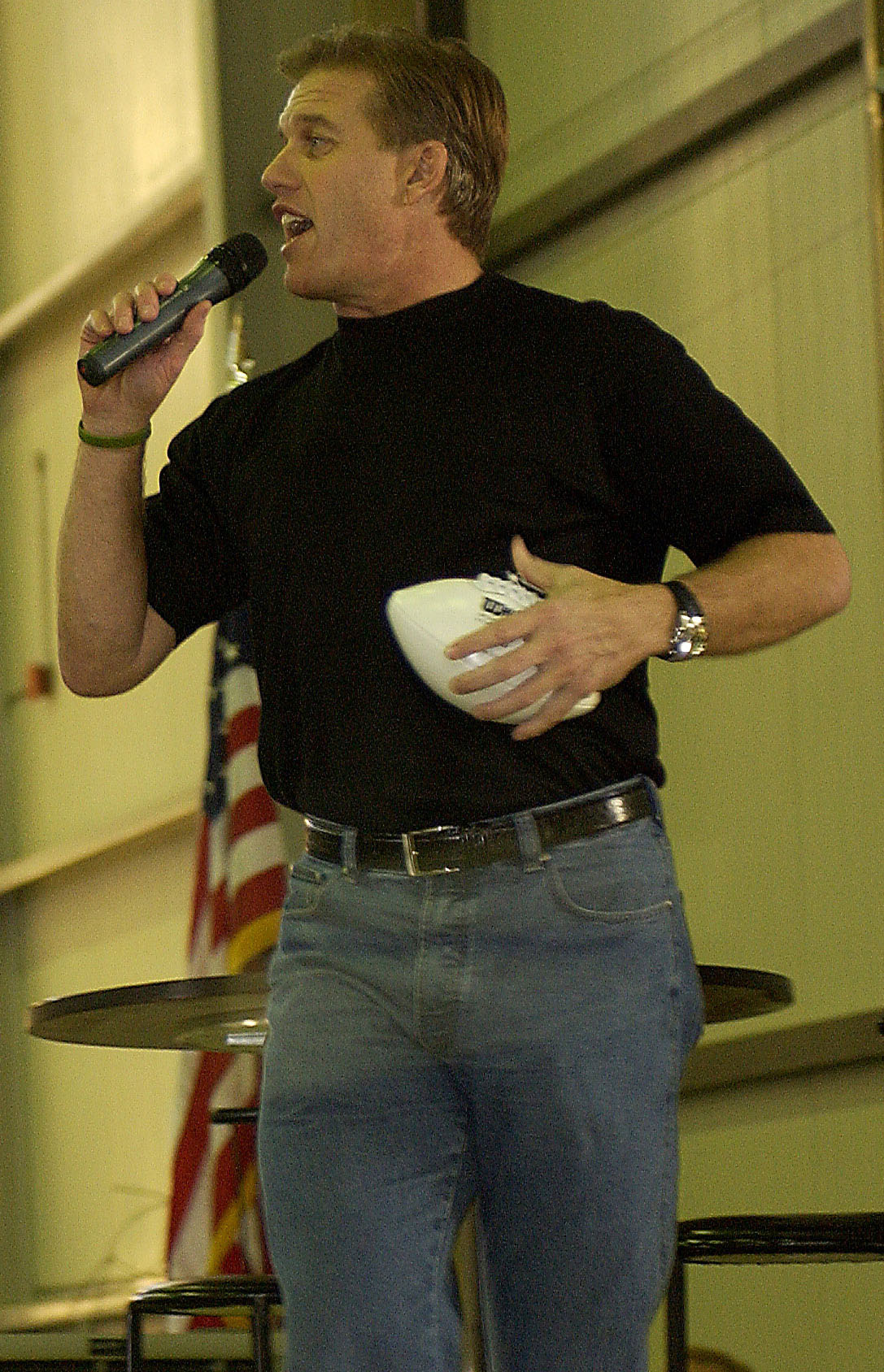
John Elway (1983–1998)

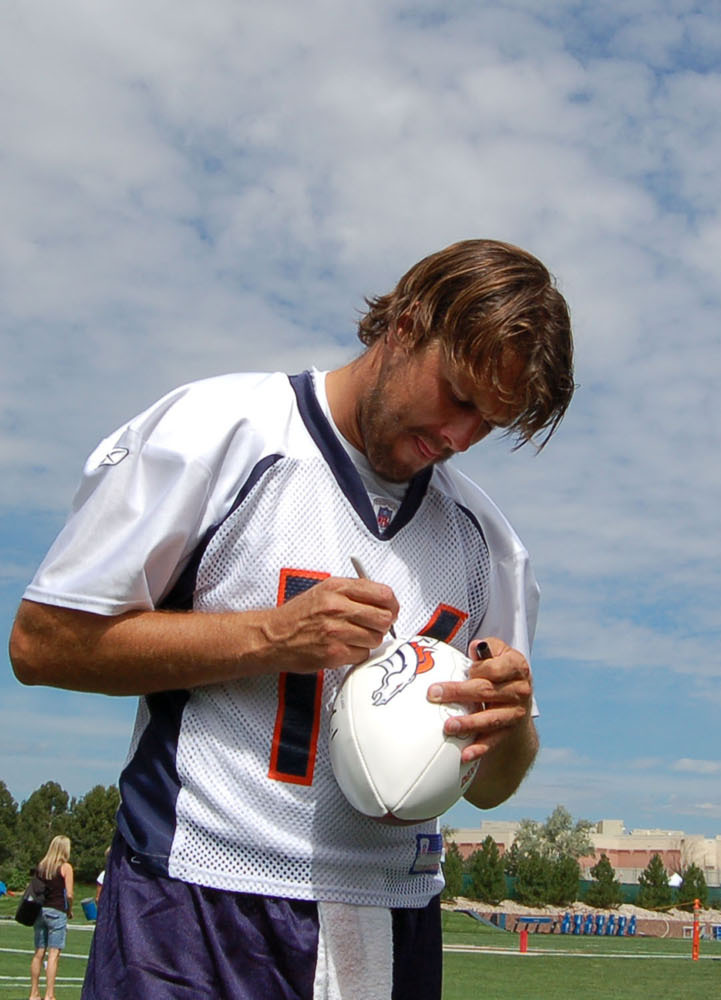
Jake Plummer (2003–2006)

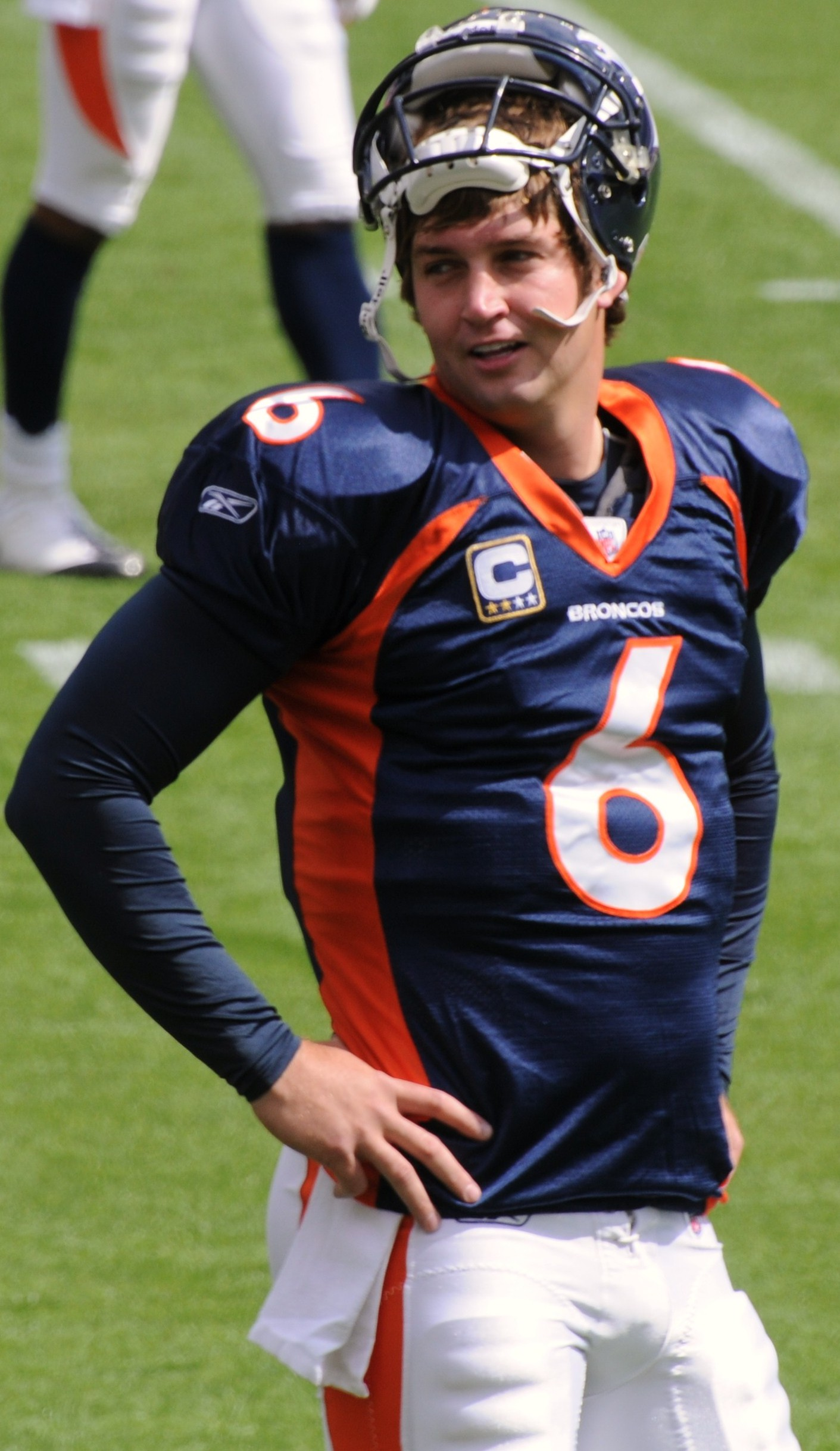
Jay Cutler (2006–2008)

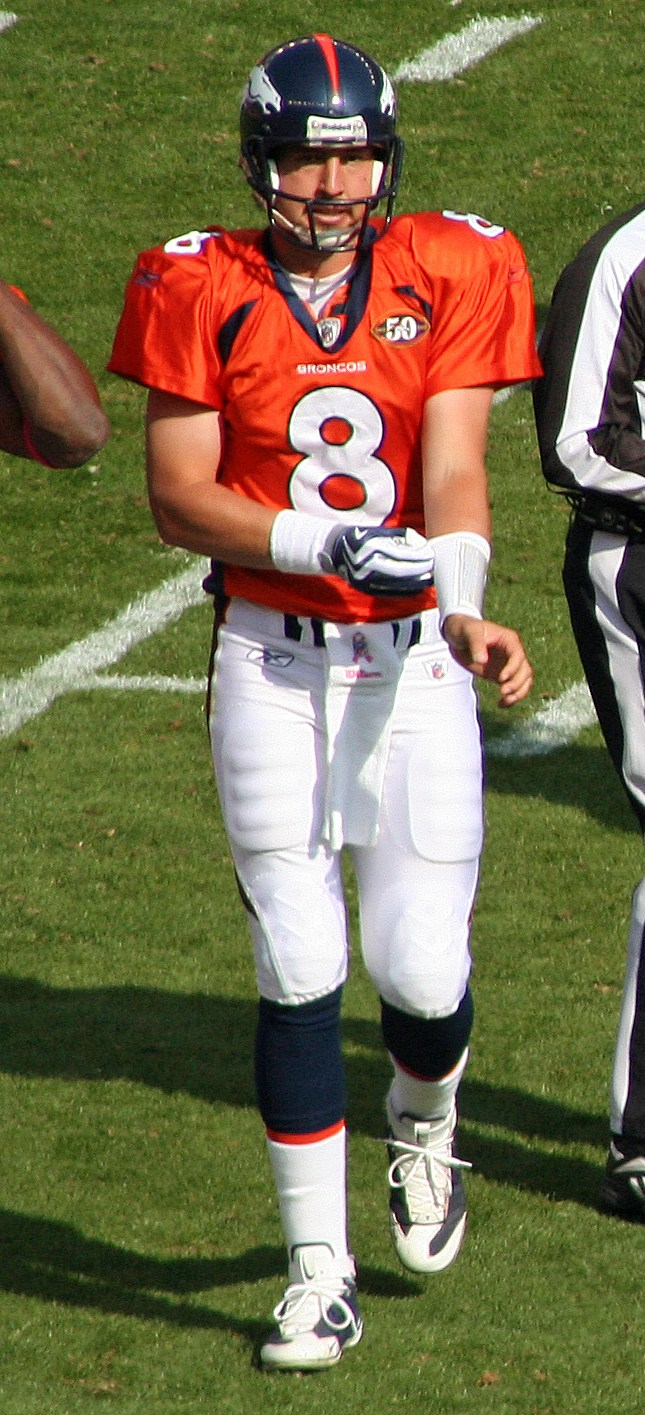
Kyle Orton (2009–2011)

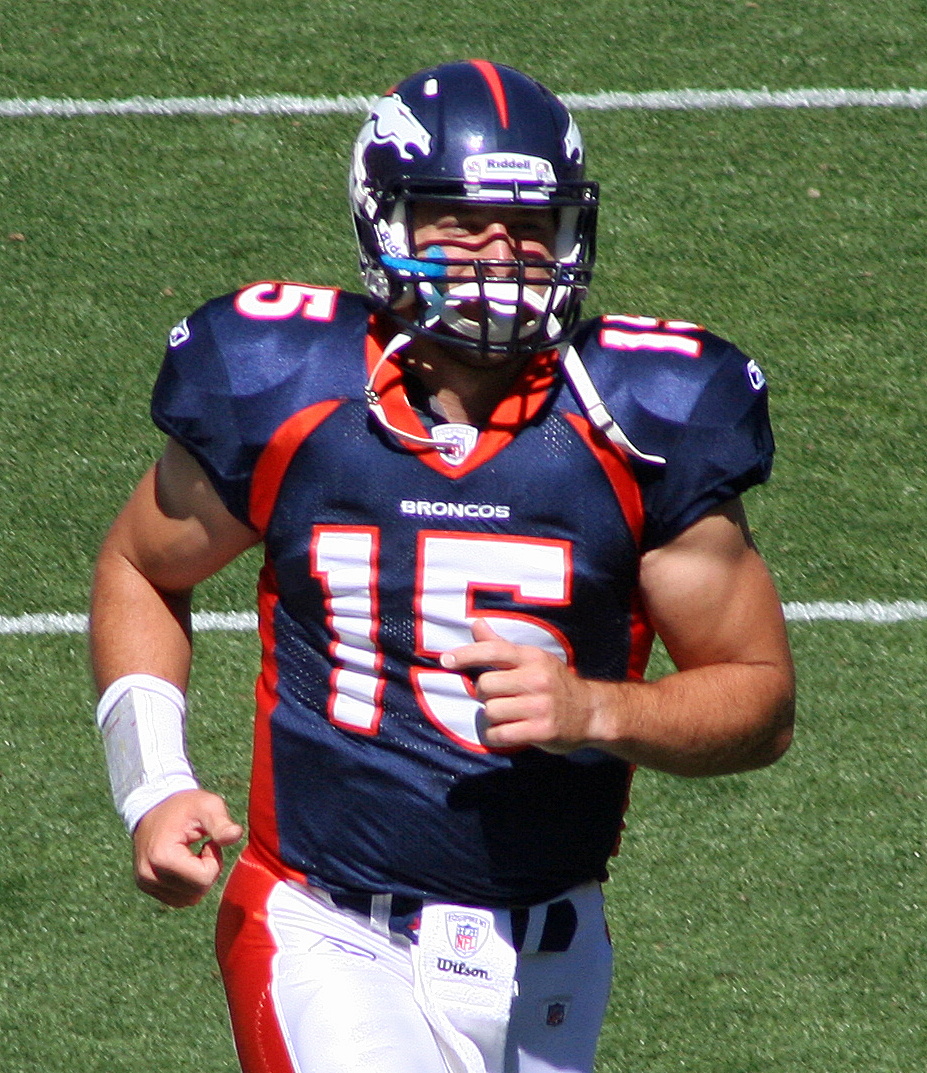
Tim Tebow (2010–2011)

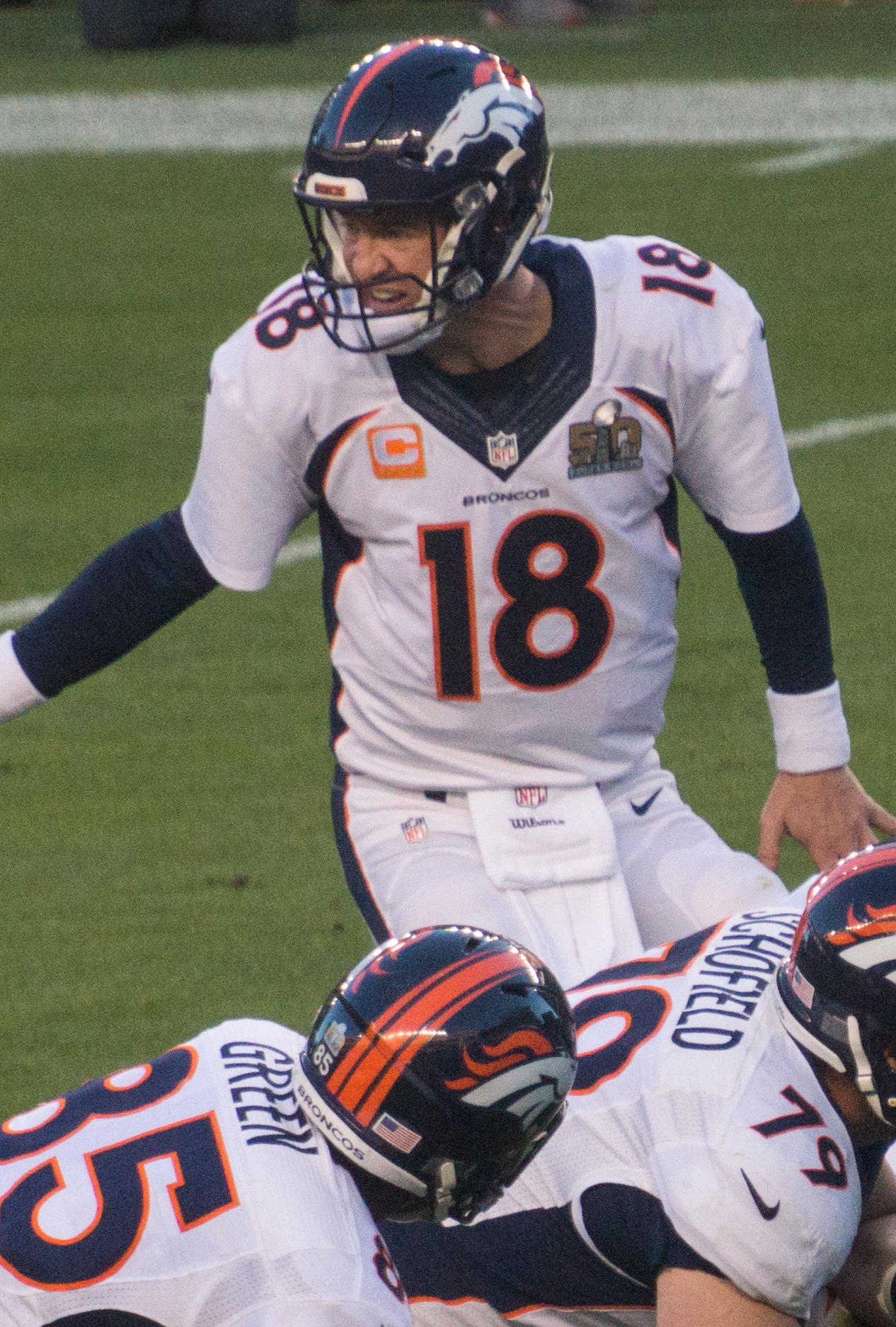
Peyton Manning (2012–2015)

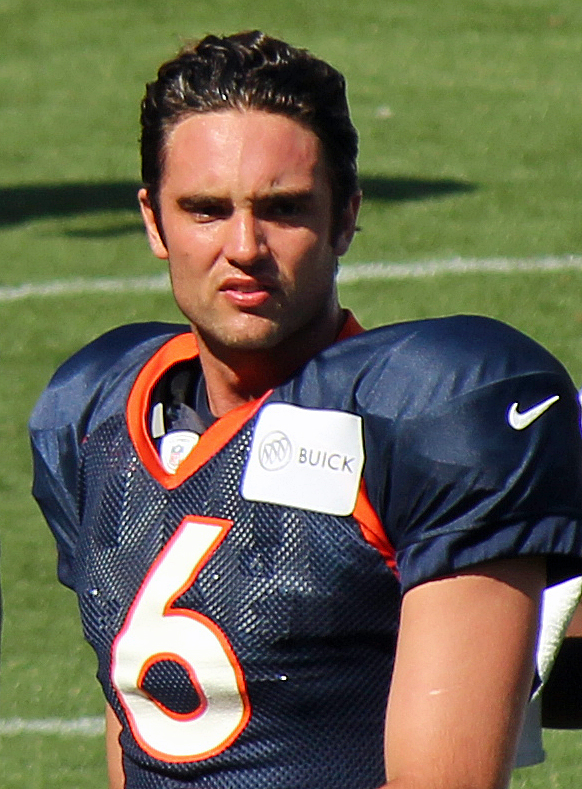
Brock Osweiler (2015, 2017)

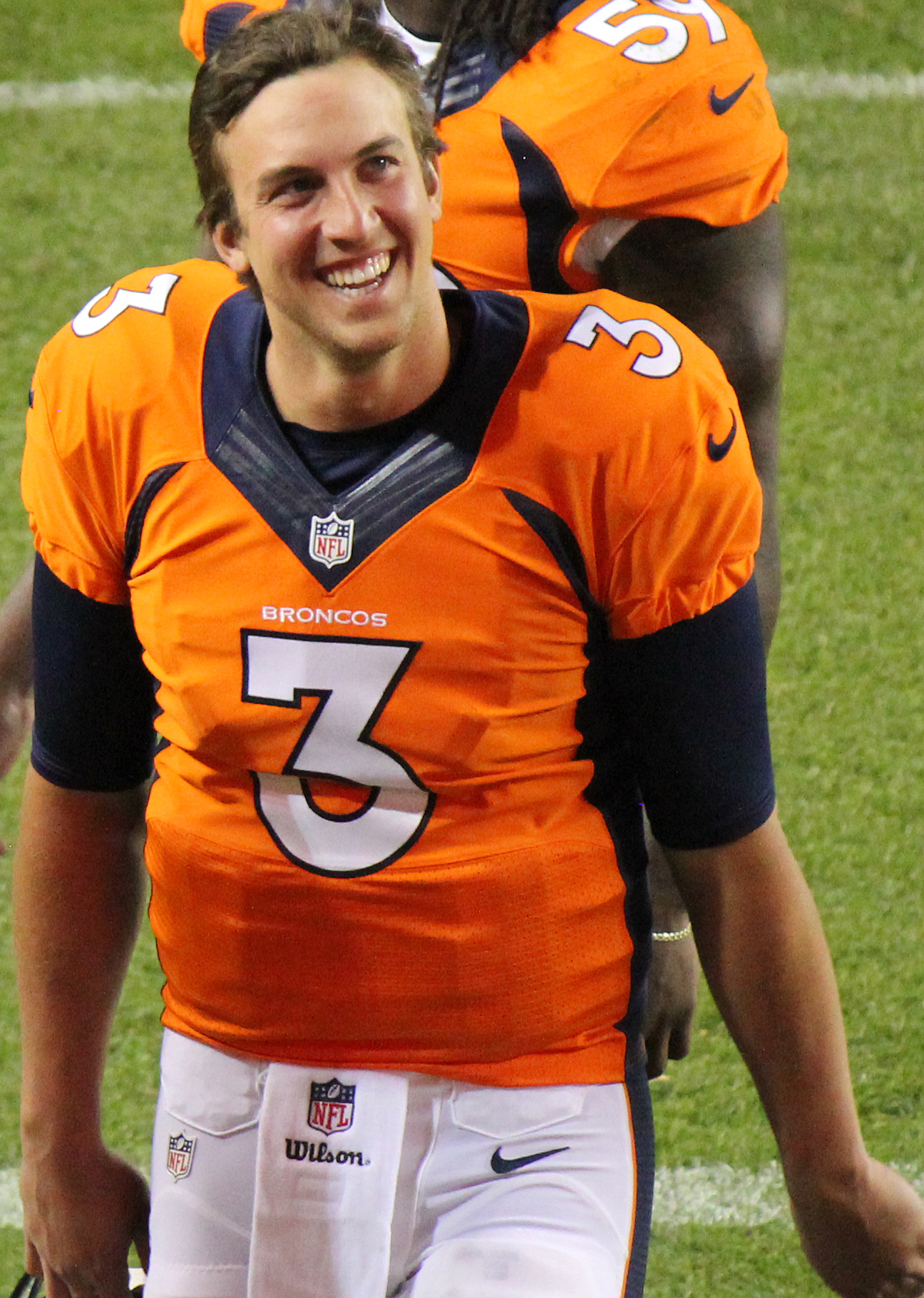
Trevor Siemian (2016–2017)

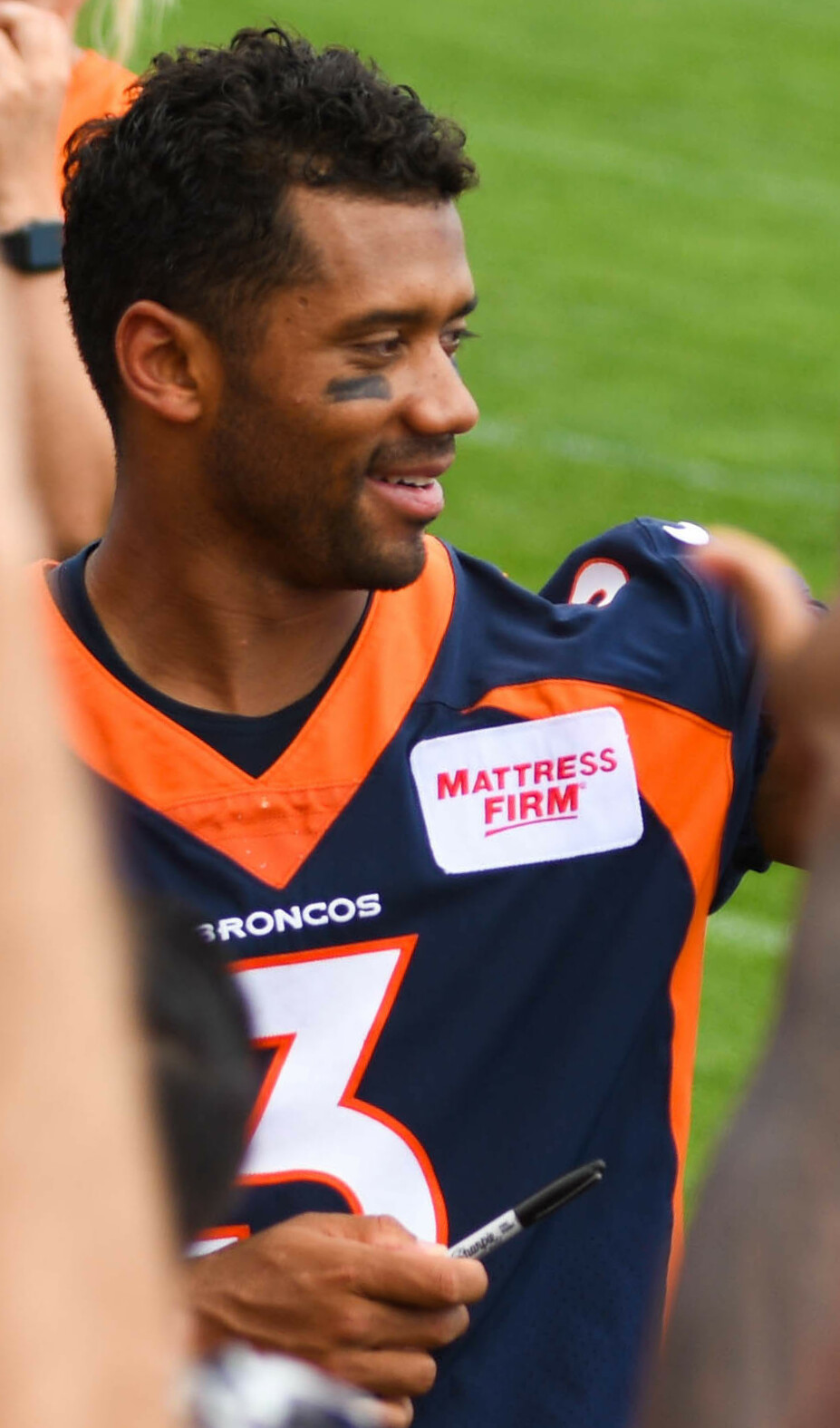
Russell Wilson (2022–2023)

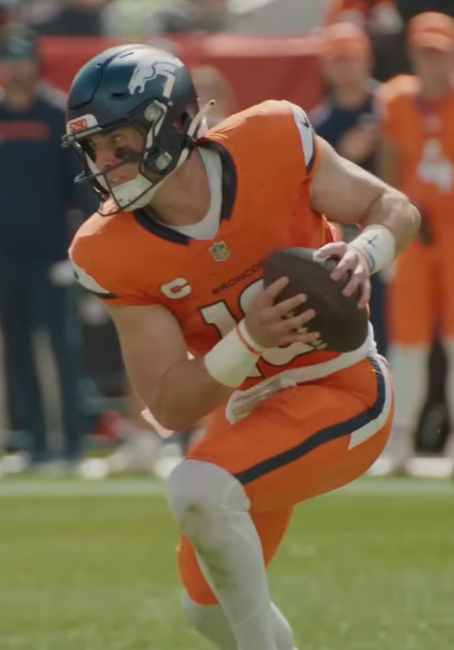
Bo Nix (2024–present)

These quarterbacks have started at least one game for the Denver Broncos of the National Football League (NFL).

== Starting quarterbacks ==
The number of games they started during the season is listed to the right:

=== Regular season ===
Season(s)	Quarterback(s)
1960 (AFL)	Frank Tripucka (14)
1961 (AFL)	Frank Tripucka (10) / George Herring (4)
1962 (AFL)	Frank Tripucka (13) / George Shaw (1)
1963 (AFL)	Mickey Slaughter (7) / John McCormick (3) / Don Breaux (2) / Frank Tripucka (2)
1964 (AFL)	Jacky Lee (10) / Mickey Slaughter (4)
1965 (AFL)	Mickey Slaughter (7) / John McCormick (6) / Jacky Lee (1)
1966 (AFL)	Max Choboian (7) / John McCormick (5) / Scotty Glacken (1) / Mickey Slaughter (1)
1967 (AFL)	Steve Tensi (12) / Jim LeClair (2)
1968 (AFL)	Steve Tensi (6) / Marlin Briscoe (5) / Jim LeClair (2) / John McCormick (1)
1969 (AFL)	Steve Tensi (12) / Pete Liske (2)
1970	Pete Liske (9) / Chuck Pastrana (3) / Steve Tensi (2)
1971	Don Horn (9) / Steve Ramsey (5)
1972	Charley Johnson (9) / Steve Ramsey (5)
1973	Charley Johnson (14)
1974	Charley Johnson (12) / Steve Ramsey (2)
1975	Steve Ramsey (7) / Charley Johnson (6) / John Hufnagel (1)
1976	Steve Ramsey (12) / Craig Penrose (2)
1977	Craig Morton (14)
1978	Craig Morton (13) / Craig Penrose (2) / Norris Weese (1)
1979	Craig Morton (10) / Norris Weese (6)
1980	Craig Morton (9) / Matt Robinson (7)
1981	Craig Morton (15) / Steve DeBerg (1)
1982	Steve DeBerg (5) / Craig Morton (3) / Mark Herrmann (1)
1983	John Elway (10) / Steve DeBerg (5) / Gary Kubiak (1)
1984	John Elway (14) / Gary Kubiak (2)
1985	John Elway (16)
1986	John Elway (16)
1987	John Elway (12) / Ken Karcher (3)
1988	John Elway (15) / Gary Kubiak (1)
1989	John Elway (15) / Gary Kubiak (1)
1990	John Elway (16)
1991	John Elway (16)
1992	John Elway (12) / Tommy Maddox (4)
1993	John Elway (16)
1994	John Elway (14) / Hugh Millen (2)
1995	John Elway (16)
1996	John Elway (15) / Bill Musgrave (1)
1997	John Elway (16)
1998	John Elway (12) / Bubby Brister (4)
1999	Brian Griese (13) / Chris Miller (3)
2000	Brian Griese (10) / Gus Frerotte (6)
2001	Brian Griese (15) / Gus Frerotte (1)
2002	Brian Griese (13) / Steve Beuerlein (3)
2003	Jake Plummer (11) / Steve Beuerlein (2) / Danny Kanell (2) / Jarious Jackson (1)
2004	Jake Plummer (16)
2005	Jake Plummer (16)
2006	Jake Plummer (11) / Jay Cutler (5)
2007	Jay Cutler (16)
2008	Jay Cutler (16)
2009	Kyle Orton (15) / Chris Simms (1)
2010	Kyle Orton (13) / Tim Tebow (3)
2011	Tim Tebow (11) / Kyle Orton (5)
2012	Peyton Manning (16)
2013	Peyton Manning (16)
2014	Peyton Manning (16)
2015	Peyton Manning (9) / Brock Osweiler (7)
2016	Trevor Siemian (14) / Paxton Lynch (2)
2017	Trevor Siemian (10) / Brock Osweiler (4) / Paxton Lynch (2)
2018	Case Keenum (16)
2019	Joe Flacco (8) / Drew Lock (5) / Brandon Allen (3)
2020	Drew Lock (13) / Jeff Driskel (1) / Brett Rypien (1) / Kendall Hinton (1) (Note: In Week 12 of the 2020 NFL season against the New Orleans Saints, backup quarterback Jeff Driskel tested positive for COVID-19 and all of Denver's quarterbacks were ruled ineligible due to being close contacts with him. As a result, practice squad wide receiver Kendall Hinton, who had some experience at quarterback while he played college football at Wake Forest, was activated to play in the game as the Broncos primary passer. However, as the Broncos lined up in wildcat formation with running back Phillip Lindsay under center for the first four plays, Lindsay technically started the game at quarterback. However, Hinton became the first non-quarterback to play significant snaps at the position in an NFL game since running back Tom Matte with the Baltimore Colts in 1965.)
2021	Teddy Bridgewater (14) / Drew Lock (3)
2022	Russell Wilson (15) / Brett Rypien (2)
2023	Russell Wilson (15) / Jarrett Stidham (2)
2024	Bo Nix (17)
2025	Bo Nix (17)
2026	Bo Nix (8)

=== Post-season ===
Season	Quarterback(s)
1977	Craig Morton (2–1)
1978	Craig Morton (0–1)
1979	Craig Morton (0–1)
1983	Steve DeBerg (0–1)
1984	John Elway (0–1)
1986	John Elway (2–1)
1987	John Elway (2–1)
1989	John Elway (2–1)
1991	John Elway (1–1)
1993	John Elway (0–1)
1996	John Elway (0–1)
1997	John Elway (4–0)
1998	John Elway (3–0)
2000	Gus Frerotte (0–1)
2003	Jake Plummer (0–1)
2004	Jake Plummer (0–1)
2005	Jake Plummer (1–1)
2011	Tim Tebow (1–1)
2012	Peyton Manning (0–1)
2013	Peyton Manning (2–1)
2014	Peyton Manning (0–1)
2015	Peyton Manning (3–0)
2024	Bo Nix (0–1)
2025	Bo Nix (1–0) / Jarrett Stidham (0–1)

== Most games as starting quarterback ==
These quarterbacks have the most starts for the Broncos in regular season games (through the 2026 NFL season).

Name	
GP	Games played
GS	Games started
W	Number of wins as starting quarterback
L	Number of losses as starting quarterback
T	Number of ties as starting quarterback
Pct	Winning percentage as starting quarterback

Name	Period	GP	GS	W	L	T	%
John Elway	1983–1998	234	231	146	80	1	.645
Craig Morton	1977–1982	72	64	41	23	—	.641
Peyton Manning	2012–2015	58	57	45	12	—	.789
Jake Plummer	2003–2006	59	54	39	15	—	.722
Brian Griese	1998–2002	53	51	27	24	—	.520
Charley Johnson	1972–1975	54	41	20	18	3	.524
Frank Tripucka	1960–1963	44	39	13	25	1	.346
Jay Cutler	2006–2008	37	37	17	20	—	.459
Bo Nix	2024–present	36	36	25	11	–	.694
Kyle Orton	2009–2011	34	33	12	21	—	.364
Steve Tensi	1967–1970	41	32	10	21	1	.328
Steve Ramsey	1971–1976	53	31	14	17	—	.452
Russell Wilson	2022–2023	30	30	11	19	—	.367
Trevor Siemian	2015–2017	26	24	12	11	—	.522

== Team career passing records ==
Through the 2026 NFL season

Name	Comp	Att	%	Yds	TD	Int
John Elway	4,123	7,250	56.9	51,475	300	226
Peyton Manning	1,443	2,170	66.5	17,112	140	53
Brian Griese	1,044	1,678	62.2	11,763	71	53
Jake Plummer	944	1,596	59.1	11,631	71	47
Craig Morton	907	1,594	56.9	11,895	74	65
Bo Nix	803	1,238	64.9	8,125	56	25
Jay Cutler	762	1,220	62.5	9,024	54	37
Kyle Orton	720	1,194	60.3	8,434	49	28
Frank Tripucka	662	1,277	51.8	7,676	51	85
Russell Wilson	589	930	63.3	6,594	42	19
Charley Johnson	517	970	53.3	7,238	52	52

== See also ==
- List of American Football League players
- List of NFL starting quarterbacks
