= Charles Smith (basketball coach) =

American high school basketball coach (born 1949)

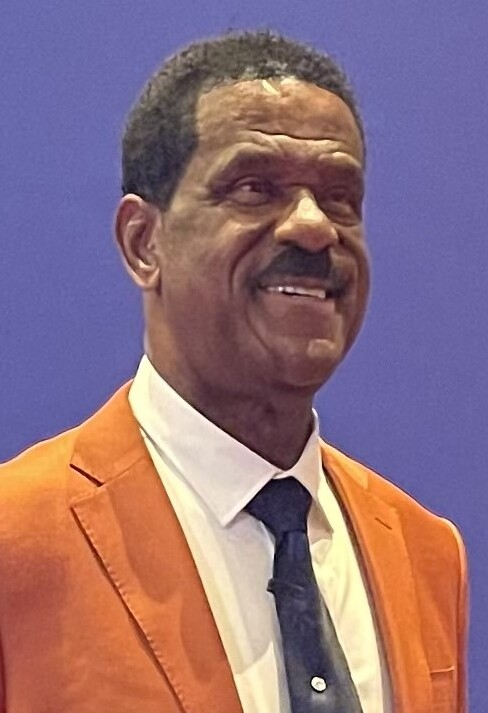
- Smith in 2024

Peabody Warhorses
- Position: Head coach

Personal information
- Born: May 15, 1949 (age 77) near Alexandria, Louisiana, U.S.

Career information
- High school: Alfred Wettermark High School (Boyce, Louisiana)
- College: Paul Quinn
- Coaching career: 1971–present

Career history

Coaching
- 1971–1973: J. S. Slocum HS (assistant)
- 1975–1985: Peabody Magnet HS (assistant)
- 1985–present: Peabody Magnet HS
- Basketball Hall of Fame

Charles Smith (born May 15, 1949) is an American high school basketball coach. He has served as the head coach of Peabody Magnet High School since 1985. Smith was inducted into the Naismith Memorial Basketball Hall of Fame in 2024.

== Early life ==
Smith was born on May 15, 1949, near Alexandria, Louisiana. He was the oldest of seven children born to a veteran of the United States Army and a school teacher. He played baseball growing up, having become interested in the sport after watching Negro league games at a young age. He attended Alfred Wettermark High School in Boyce, where he competed in multiple sports. He graduated from Wettermark in 1967 and then attended Paul Quinn College in Texas on a baseball scholarship. He was the first member of his family to attend and graduate college, receiving a bachelor's degree in mathematics in 1971. He played baseball at Paul Quinn and claimed to have been drafted by the Cincinnati Reds of Major League Baseball (MLB), but did not play baseball professionally.

== Coaching career ==
After graduating from college, Smith returned to Louisiana and became a math teacher and assistant basketball coach at J. S. Slocum High School. After two years there, he left to become a teacher at Pineville High School, but did not coach basketball there. In 1975, he joined Peabody Magnet High School as a teacher and assistant to head basketball coach Earnest Bowman. As an assistant coach, he helped Peabody win the state championship in 1979, their first, with the team featuring future NBA player Paul Thompson. In 1985, he succeeded Bowman as head coach at Peabody.

Although his team did poorly in his first two years – going 8–18 his first year and then 13–16 the next – his "brand of disciplined and defense-driven basketball" soon began to have success. He led Peabody to a 28–7 record in 1987–88 which resulted in his first state tournament appearance and district title, and Peabody finished as state runner-up in 1990, then won the state title in 1991. His teams then showed dominance throughout the ensuing years; as of 2019, Smith's teams had won at least 22 games every year from 1988. He won his 500th game in 2003 and his 1,000th in 2018, while he broke the all-time Louisiana wins record with 1,072 in 2020.

Smith, by 2019, had won the district title 28 times, including a streak of 19 consecutive titles that ended in 2014. By that point, he had led Peabody to the Top 28 18 times, while having never lost in the first round of the state playoffs. He has won ten state championships as a head coach – 1991, 2000, 2004, 2007, 2010, 2012, 2017, 2020, 2024, and 2026 – and compiled undefeated 41–0 records in 2004 and 2010, with him being named the ESPN National Coach of the Year in the latter season while both of those teams placed highly in the national rankings. He is a five-time recipient of the Louisiana Sports Writers Association (LSWA) Coach of the Year award, and in 2020, he served as a head coach at the McDonald's All-American Game.

By 2024, Smith had compiled a record of 1,204–214, being fourth all-time in high school basketball history for wins. He has coached over 60 players that received college scholarships, and over 70 that played college basketball, including his son, Kedric, and grandson, Jacoby, both of whom played at the NCAA Division I level. As head coach, he has coached one person who has played in the NBA, Markel Brown. Smith wrote a book on his life, Legendary Coach Charles Smith: In My Footsteps, and a documentary was produced about his time at Peabody, called Chasing 1,000 Wins. He was inducted into the Louisiana Sports Hall of Fame in 2019. In 2024, he was inducted into the Naismith Memorial Basketball Hall of Fame, only the sixth high school coach ever to receive the honor. He was inducted in his first year of consideration.

== Personal life ==
Smith has been married to his wife, Rosa, for over 50 years. He has a daughter, Dr. Camacia Ross, and a son, Kedric, who, after playing for him at Peabody, became a coach at Buckeye High School and later became an assistant at Peabody. His grandson, Jacoby Ross, played professionally in Europe. Smith earned his master's degree from Northwestern State University in 1981. He was the recipient of the school's "Nth Degree" in 2025, for "individuals who have gone the extra mile in meritorious service to the university or the community."
