= Ray Jones (American football) =

American football player (born 1947)

No. 21, 80, 49, 23, 20, 42
- Position: Defensive back

Personal information
- Born: December 24, 1947 (age 78); Lufkin, Texas, U.S.
- Listed height: 5 ft 11 in (1.80 m)
- Listed weight: 187 lb (85 kg)

Career information
- High school: Peabody (Alexandria, Louisiana)
- College: Southern (1966–1969)
- NFL draft: 1970: 2nd round, 34th overall pick

Career history
- Philadelphia Eagles (1970); Pennsylvania Firebirds (1970); Miami Dolphins (1971); San Diego Chargers (1971–1972); Denver Broncos (1973)*; New Orleans Saints (1973); Edmonton Eskimos (1974)*; Portland Storm (1974); Green Bay Packers (1975)*
- * Offseason or practice squad member only

Career NFL statistics
- Interceptions: 2
- Fumble recoveries: 2
- Stats at Pro Football Reference

Raymond Jones (born December 24, 1947) is an American former professional football player who was a defensive back for four seasons in the National Football League (NFL) with the Philadelphia Eagles, Miami Dolphins, San Diego Chargers and New Orleans Saints. He was selected by the Eagles in the second round of the 1970 NFL draft after playing college football for the Southern Jaguars.

== Early life and college ==
Raymond Jones was born on December 24, 1947, in Lufkin, Texas. He attended Peabody Magnet High School in Alexandria, Louisiana.

Jones was a member of the Jaguars of Southern University from 1966 to 1969.

== Professional career ==
Jones was selected by the Philadelphia Eagles in the second round, with the 34th overall, of the 1970 NFL draft. He played in 12 games, starting ten, for the Eagles during the 1970 season, recording two interceptions, one fumble recovery, and six kick returns for 97 yards. He also spent part of the season with the Pennsylvania Firebirds of the Atlantic Coast Football League. Jones was released by the Eagles in 1971.

He signed with the Miami Dolphins in 1971. He appeared in two games that year before being waived.

Jones was claimed off waivers by the San Diego Chargers in 1971. He played in all 14 games, starting four, for the Chargers during the 1972 season, totaling three kick returns for 41 yards, two fumble recoveries, and two fumbles.

Jones was purchased by the Denver Broncos on August 1, 1973, but later released.

He signed with the New Orleans Saints in 1973. He played in two games, starting one, for the Saints during the 1973 season. He was released later in 1973.

Jones signed with the Edmonton Eskimos of the Canadian Football League in 1974, but was later released.

He was signed by the Portland Storm of the World Football League in 1974. He recorded one interception for 12 yards and one punt return for 13 yards for the Storm during the 1974 season.

Jones signed with the Green Bay Packers in 1975. However, he was later released.

== Post-football career ==
In 1980, Jones released a book titled The Black and White of Selling.
