= John Baptist Lafargue =

American educator and editor

John Baptist LaFargue
- Born: June 1864; Avoyelles Parish, Louisiana, U.S.
- Died: After 1937
- Other names: J. B. Lafargue, John B. Lafargue
- Occupation(s): Educator, school founder, principal, newspaper publisher, newspaper editor
- Spouse: Sarah C. B. Mayo

John Baptist LaFargue (June 1864 – after 1937) was an American educator, school founder, principal, newspaper publisher, and editor in Louisiana.

== Biography ==
John Baptist LaFargue was born June 1864 in Avoyelles Parish, Louisiana. He studied at a school established with support from the Peabody Educational Fund.

LaFargue worked for 14 years to establish the first "colored" newspaper in the area at the Marksville Bulletin office in Marksville, Louisiana. He was a former editor of the National Alliance; and the editor and publisher of the Advance Messenger newspaper in Alexandria, Louisiana. He edited The Banner newspaper in Alexandria, Louisiana.

LaFargue founded in 1895 the Peabody Industrial School (now Peabody Magnet High School) in Alexandria; and was the school principal for many years. He organized the Colored State Teachers Association in Louisiana in 1901, and was elected Conductor of the Parish Teachers’ Institute for over 20 years. He was state secretary of the CFA.

He married Sarah C. B. Mayo in 1887. She was the daughter of John Mayo, a former representative of the Louisiana House of Representatives.

== Legacy ==
There is a J. B. Lafargue Special Education Center in Rapides Parish. He will be part of a future PBS documentary by Ken Burns, "Emancipation to Exodus".

== See also ==
- Peabody Education Fund
