= Jacobian Guillory =

American football player (born 2000)

Profile
- Position: Defensive tackle

Personal information
- Born: October 25, 2000 (age 26)
- Listed height: 6 ft 2 in (1.88 m)
- Listed weight: 318 lb (144 kg)

Career information
- High school: Alexandria Senior (Alexandria, Louisiana)
- College: LSU (2020–2025)
- NFL draft: 2026: undrafted

Career history
- Los Angeles Chargers (2026)*
- * Offseason or practice squad member only
- Stats at Pro Football Reference

Jacobian Guillory II (born October 25, 2000) is an American professional football defensive tackle. He played college football for the LSU Tigers.

== Early life ==
Guillory attended Alexandria Senior High School in Alexandria, Louisiana. Coming out of high school, he committed to play college football for the LSU Tigers.

== College career ==
In his first four seasons from 2020 to 2023, Guillory totaled 51 tackles and two tackles for loss in 39 games. His 2024 season was limited to two games due to a torn torn Achilles tendon. Guillory entered the 2025 season as a full-time starter on the Tigers defensive line. He finished the season with 20 tackles with four going for a loss, and a sack and a half in 13 games.

== Professional career ==
After not being selected in the 2026 NFL draft, Guillory signed with the Los Angeles Chargers as an undrafted free agent. He was waived by Los Angeles as a part of final roster cuts on August 30, 2026.
