= Deville, Louisiana =

Deville
- Census-designated place
- Location of Deville in Louisiana
- Coordinates: 31°21′33″N 92°08′20″W
- Country: United States
- State: Louisiana
- Parish: Rapides

Area
  - Total: 13.23 sq mi (34.27 km^{2})
  - Land: 13.14 sq mi (34.04 km^{2})
  - Water: 0.089 sq mi (0.23 km^{2})
- Elevation: 52 ft (16 m)

Population (2020)
  - Total: 1,761
  - Density: 134.0/sq mi (51.73/km^{2})
- Time zone: UTC-6 (CST)
  - Summer (DST): UTC-5 (CDT)
- Area code: 318
- FIPS code: 22-20890
- GNIS feature ID: 2402408

Deville is a census-designated place (CDP) in Rapides Parish, Louisiana, United States. It is part of the Alexandria, Louisiana Metropolitan Statistical Area.

== Geography ==
Deville is located at 31°20′48″N 92°9′29″W (31.346772, -92.158035).

According to the United States Census Bureau, the CDP has a total area of 5.7 square miles (15 km^{2}), all land.

== Demographics ==
Historical population
Census	Pop.	Note	%±
1990	1,113		—
2000	1,007		−9.5%
2010	1,764		75.2%
2020	1,761		−0.2%
U.S. Decennial Census; 1950 1960 1970 1980; 1990 2000 2010

Deville first appeared as a census designated place in the 1990 United States census.

At the 2000 census there were 1,007 people, 363 households, and 295 families in the CDP. The population density was 177.7 inhabitants per square mile (68.6/km^{2}). There were 386 housing units at an average density of 68.1 per square mile (26.3/km^{2}). The racial makeup of the CDP was 97.62% White, 0.10% African American, 1.09% Native American, and 1.19% from two or more races. Hispanic or Latino of any race were 0.10%.

Of the 363 households 44.9% had children under the age of 18 living with them, 71.1% were married couples living together, 7.4% had a female householder with no husband present, and 18.7% were non-families. 16.3% of households were one person and 6.6% were one person aged 65 or older. The average household size was 2.77 and the average family size was 3.10.

The age distribution was 30.2% under the age of 18, 8.9% from 18 to 24, 28.7% from 25 to 44, 21.7% from 45 to 64, and 10.4% 65 or older. The median age was 34 years. For every 100 females, there were 92.9 males. For every 100 females age 18 and over, there were 89.5 males.

The median household income was $21,700 and the median family income was $28,398. Males had a median income of $21,708 versus $16,094 for females. The per capita income for the CDP was $9,618. About 14.3% of families and 17.1% of the population were below the poverty line, including 10.4% of those under age 18 and 48.6% of those age 65 or over.

== Education ==
Deville is a part of Rapides Parish School District. The town has two elementary schools, Buckeye Elementary and Hayden R. Lawrence Upper Elementary, and one high school, Buckeye High School. There are no K-12, middle schools, or junior high schools.
