= Gabriel Prize =

Architecture award

The Gabriel Prize is an award given annually by the Western European Architectural Foundation, through a three-stage national competition, to one American candidate working in the field of architecture or landscape architecture. Results are announced in March of each year.

Award winners spend three months in residence in France, focusing on a particular aspect of French architecture they have chosen to research. They spend much of their sabbatical traveling, sketching and measuring, and in the course of three months, produce three large renderings. The laureates work closely with the foundation's European representative, a Parisian architect who serves to assist their progress.

The Prize was founded in 1991 by George Parker Jr.

== List of Winners ==
2019 - Lane Rick
2018 - Diego Arias
2017 - Barbara Worth Ratner
2016 - Marcela Delgado
2015 - Stephanie Arrienda Jazmines
2014 - Nicholas Quiring
2013 - Stephanie Bower
2012 - Daria Khapalova
2011 - Simon David
2010 - George J. Martin
2009 - Jay Cantrell
2008 - Riggs Pearson Skepnek
2007 - Joyce Rosner
2006 - Mario C. Cortes
2005 - Michael Reardon
2004 - Victor Agran
2003 - David E. Gamble
2002 - Alexander Fernandez
2001 - Richard Chenoweth
2000 - Mireille Roddier
1999 - Melissa Weese Goodill
1999 - Erik Thorkildsen
1998 - Alexander Ortenberg
1997 - Ron Witte
1996 - Stephen W. Harby
1995 - C. Errol Barron Jr.
1994 - Stephen A. Bross
1993 - Kimberly R. Kohlhaas
1993 - David T. Mayernik
1992 - Amy E. Gardner
1991 - Ralph Jackson
