= Rapides Parish School Board =

School district in Louisiana, United States

Rapides Parish School Board is a school district headquartered in Alexandria, Louisiana.

It covers all of Rapides Parish.

== History ==
By 1993 the district had established a secondary school for students with behavior issues, called Redirection Academy. That year, the U.S. federal court system stopped the district from establishing a magnet school for academically advanced students.

Jeff Powell became the superintendent in 2019. In 2024, the board of trustees voted to extend his term by four years. Seven board members voted in favor and two voted against.

== Schools ==
=== K-12 schools ===
- Glenmora High School
- Northwood High School
- Oak Hill High School
- Plainview High School

=== High schools ===
- Alexandria Senior High School
- Buckeye High School
- Peabody Magnet High School
- Pineville High School
- Rapides High School
- Tioga High School

=== Magnet schools ===
- Alexandria Middle Magnet School
- Bolton Academy
- Mabel Brasher Montessori School
- Peabody Montessori Elementary School
- Carter C. Raymond Junior School
- Rosenthal Montessori Elementary School
- Arthur F. Smith Middle Magnet School

== Operations ==
By 2015, the district had established a school uniform for all schools.
