= Craig Nall =

American football player (born 1979)

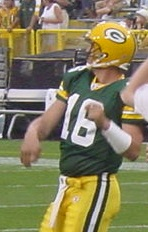
- Nall with the Green Bay Packers in 2003

No. 16
- Position: Quarterback

Personal information
- Born: April 21, 1979 (age 47); Alexandria, Louisiana, U.S.
- Listed height: 6 ft 3 in (1.91 m)
- Listed weight: 227 lb (103 kg)

Career information
- High school: Alexandria
- College: LSU (1997–2000); Northwestern State (2001)
- NFL draft: 2002: 5th round, 164th overall pick

Career history
- Green Bay Packers (2002–2005); Scottish Claymores (2003); Buffalo Bills (2006–2007); Houston Texans (2007); Green Bay Packers (2007); Houston Texans (2008); Florida Tuskers (2009)*
- * Offseason or practice squad member only

Awards and highlights
- All-NFL Europe (2003)

Career NFL statistics
- TD–INT: 5–0
- Passing yards: 402
- Passer rating: 123.8
- Stats at Pro Football Reference

Craig Matthew Nall (born April 21, 1979) is an American former professional football player who was a quarterback in the National Football League (NFL). He played college football for the LSU Tigers and Northwestern State Demons. Nall was selected by the Green Bay Packers in the fifth round of the 2002 NFL draft. He also played for the Buffalo Bills and Houston Texans; he also had brief stints with the Scottish Claymores of NFL Europe and the Florida Tuskers of the United Football League (UFL).

== Early life ==
Nall was born in Alexandria, Louisiana, and attended Alexandria Senior High School, where he was the quarterback for the football team, having thrown for 5,038 yards and 38 touchdowns.

== College career ==
=== LSU ===
Nall initially played college football at Louisiana State University. He was redshirted in 1997. In 1998, he was the #2 quarterback behind senior Herb Tyler. When Tyler suffered an injury late in the game at Notre Dame, Nall came off of the bench to lead to Tigers the length of the field in a furious comeback attempt. The comeback came up short as an LSU receiver dropped the potential game winning pass in the end zone on fourth down as time was winding down. Nall then started the next week in the last game of the season at #13 Arkansas. Nall was sacked six times and threw for 147 yards and was intercepted once.

In 1999, Nall had to battle Josh Booty and Rohan Davey for the quarterback position. Nall was named the starter for the season opener but was benched at halftime with LSU leading. He was sacked once for 8 yards and he threw two interceptions in 15 attempts (completing 6 of 15 for 79 yards). Nall made only one other brief appearance at quarterback for LSU in 1999 as he got some late mop-up duty the next week. Nall did not play quarterback for the rest of the season.

Nall only got two passing attempts in the 2000 season opener after a groin injury hampered him at the end of fall camp.

=== Northwestern State ===
In 2001, Nall transferred to Northwestern State University in Natchitoches, Louisiana, where he became the first quarterback in school history to surpass 2,000 yards passing in a season.

== Professional career ==
=== Green Bay Packers (first stint) ===
He was selected out of NSU by the Green Bay Packers in the fifth round of the 2002 NFL draft with the 164th choice overall. Nall also started for the Scottish Claymores of NFL Europe in 2003 and was the league's leading passer. In 2004 Nall played in five games as Brett Favre's backup at Green Bay. He completed 23 of 33 passes for 314 yards and four touchdowns, with no interceptions, and a passer rating of 139.4.

=== Buffalo Bills ===
In 2006, Craig Nall signed as an unrestricted free agent with the Buffalo Bills, where he competed for the starting quarterback position until a hamstring injury suffered on the second day of practice ended his involvement in the competition. In 2007, he fell on the team's depth chart behind J. P. Losman and Trent Edwards. At the end of pre-season, he was cut from the team's final roster. Early into the regular season he was re-signed by the Bills but was released shortly thereafter.

=== Houston Texans (first stint) ===
On October 29, 2007, Nall was signed by the Houston Texans as insurance when starter Matt Schaub was hurt against San Diego. He was released by the Texans on November 21, 2007.

=== Green Bay Packers (second stint) ===
He signed a one-year deal with the Packers on December 1, 2007, after they released Marviel Underwood. He became a free agent in the 2008 offseason.

=== Houston Texans (second stint) ===
Nall was re-signed by the Houston Texans on November 5, 2008, after an injury to Matt Schaub. He was waived on December 17 when the team signed fellow Northwestern State alumnus cornerback David Pittman.

=== Florida Tuskers ===
Nall was signed by the Florida Tuskers of the United Football League on August 25, 2009.
