= Alexandria Senior High School (Louisiana) =

Alexandria High School

Location
- 800 Ola Lane; Alexandria, Louisiana 71303; United States; 31.270°N 92.490°W

Information
- Type: Public
- Established: 1969; 57 years ago
- School district: Rapides Parish School Board
- Superintendent: Jeff Powell
- Director: Thomas Bachman
- Principal: Jody Goodman
- Acting headteacher: Joseph Welch
- Staff: 82.26 (on FTE basis)
- Grades: 9 to 12
- Enrollment: 1,475 (2024-2025)
- Student to teacher ratio: 17.93
- Colors: Purple and gold
- Athletics conference: LHSAA 2-5A
- Sports: Tennis, basketball, American football, cheerleading, dance team (TroyDolls), volleyball, golf, soccer, track, swimming, powerlifting, softball and bowling
- Mascot: Trojans
- Nickname: ASH
- Yearbook: Epic
- Website: ash.rpsb.us

Alexandria Senior High School is a public secondary school located in Alexandria, Louisiana, United States. The school serves about 1,475 students in grades 9 to 12 in the Rapides Parish School Board district..

Alexandria Senior High (commonly referred to as "ASH") first opened in the fall of 1969. A few months before it opened, a makeshift student council was elected by the local junior and senior high school students that would be joining to create ASH's student body.

This advisory board acted as a Student Council until one could be elected. During its first meeting, the council selected the school colors purple and gold. The Council went on to choose its mascot, the Trojan. In the 2010–2011 school year, Alexandria Senior High was the second-largest school in Rapides Parish.

== Athletics ==
The high school's sports teams, the ASH Trojans, are members of the LHSAA. ASH competes in the LHSAA's top classification, Class 5A, starting in August 2013. The Trojans competed in the second highest classification, 4A, from 1991–2013, when the school was reclassified into 5A, the highest classification. ASH is currently a member of District 2-5A with Rapides Parish rival Pineville, along with Ouachita, Ruston, West Monroe, and Peabody Magnet High School.

Sports offered: American football, swimming (boys and girls), golf, cross country, soccer (boys and girls), powerlifting (boys and girls), basketball (boys and girls), tennis (boys and girls), baseball, softball, boys' and girls' track and field (outdoor and indoor), cheerleading, band (Drumline), archery and danceline.

== Principals ==
Since 1969, ASH has had 10 principals:

- R. Raymond Bamburg – 1969–1983
- Aubrey Sanders – 1983–1990, 1991–1994
- Lyle Hutchinson – 1990–1991, 1994–1998
- Rita Guinn – 1998–2000
- Joe Moreau – 2001–2007
- Billy Albritton – 2007–2010
- Duane Urbina – 2010–2017
- Jonathan Garret – 2017–2019
- Jody Goodman – 2019–2020, 2022–present
- Benjamin Arrington - 2020-2022

== Notable alumni ==
- Chris Boniol (class of 1990), American football placekicker and coach
- Reginald Nelson (class of 1994), American football offensive tackle
- Juan Pierre (class of 1995), professional baseball player
- Craig Nall (class of 1997), American football quarterback for the Green Bay Packers
- Lamar White Jr. (class of 2000), blogger and political activist
- Demar Dotson (class of 2004), American football player
- Nic Harris (class of 2005), American football linebacker who also acted in movies such as White Men Can't Jump (2023) and American Underdog (2021)
- Imoan Claiborne (class of 2010), American football cornerback
- DJ Chark (class of 2014), American football wide receiver
- Rachel Ball (class of 2019), vlogger
- Jacobian Guillory (class of 2020), American football defensive tackle
