= Imoan Claiborne =

American gridiron football player (born 1992)

No. 19
- Position: Cornerback

Personal information
- Born: July 20, 1992 (age 34); Alexandria, Louisiana, U.S.
- Listed height: 5 ft 10 in (1.78 m)
- Listed weight: 193 lb (88 kg)

Career information
- High school: Alexandria Senior
- College: Northwestern State

Career history
- 2015: St. Louis Rams*
- 2015: Tampa Bay Buccaneers*
- 2016–2017: Ottawa Redblacks
- * Offseason or practice squad member only

Awards and highlights
- Grey Cup champion (2016)
- Stats at CFL.ca

Imoan Claiborne (born July 20, 1992) is an American former professional football cornerback who played for the Ottawa Redblacks of the Canadian Football League (CFL). He played college football at Northwestern State.

== College career ==
Claiborne was an All-American cornerback who had four interceptions and three fumble recoveries last fall for the Demons. He had four-year totals of 103 tackles, six interceptions and 11 pass breakups in 37 games, 28 starts, 22 in his final two seasons. He made 48 tackles and a team-high seven pass breakups while playing in 10 ½ games as a senior. He was awarded the FCS All-America honors from The Sports Network and first-team All-Southland and All-Louisiana honors before playing in the 66th Annual Reese's Senior Bowl game.

== Professional career ==
=== St. Louis Rams ===
After going undrafted in the 2015 NFL draft Claiborne signed with the St. Louis Rams of the NFL. In a joint practice with the Dallas Cowboys in August, a brawl broke out and Claiborne punched Pro Bowl wide receiver Dez Bryant in the face. Claiborne was released on September 1.

=== Tampa Bay Buccaneers ===
Claiborne was signed to the Tampa Bay Buccaneers practice squad on September 7, 2015.

=== Ottawa Redblacks ===
On February 29, 2016, Claiborne signed with the Ottawa Redblacks of the Canadian Football League. On October 10, 2016, the Redblacks placed Claiborne on their practice squad. He dressed in six games for the Redblacks in 2016. He dressed in six games, all starts, in 2017.
