= Mickey Slaughter =

American football player (1941–2023)

No. 7, 14
- Position: Quarterback

Personal information
- Born: August 22, 1941; Monroe, Louisiana, U.S.
- Died: April 8, 2023 (aged 81); Ruston, Louisiana, U.S.
- Listed height: 6 ft 2 in (1.88 m)
- Listed weight: 204 lb (93 kg)

Career information
- High school: Bolton (LA)
- College: Louisiana Tech
- AFL draft: 1963: 7th round, 50th overall pick

Career history
- Denver Broncos (1963–1966)

Career statistics
- Passing attempts: 584
- Passing completions: 291
- Completion percentage: 49.8%
- TD–INT: 23–37
- Passing yards: 3,607
- Passer rating: 56.1
- Stats at Pro Football Reference

Milton Eugene "Mickey" Slaughter (August 22, 1941 – April 8, 2023) was an American professional football player and college coach. He played quarterback for the Denver Broncos of the American Football League (AFL) after playing college ball for the Louisiana Tech Bulldogs. Following his playing career, he was an assistant coach for Louisiana Tech.

Slaughter was raised in Alexandria, Louisiana, and played quarterback for Coach Maxie Lambright at Bolton High School, where he graduated in 1959. He then played college football for Hall of Fame coach Joe Aillet at Louisiana Tech University, where he was a three-time all-conference quarterback before graduating with a Bachelor of Arts in 1963.

== Playing career ==
Slaughter was drafted in the 7th round by the Denver Broncos, where he played his entire four-year career. Though he set several franchise rookie records in 1963 that stand to this day, he compiled just a 1-5-1 record as a starter. As of 2017's NFL off-season, his 1,689 yards, 15 interceptions, 7.57 yards per attempt, and 5 interceptions in a single game (Oct 13 against the Houston Oilers) remain Broncos rookie records. He started just 12 games the rest of his career, which ended at a 2-15-2 record. He had 291 completions on 584 attempts for 3,607 yards, 22 touchdowns, and 38 interceptions.

== Coaching career ==
After professional football, Slaughter earned a Master of Business Administration degree from Louisiana Tech University in 1966. In 1967, Slaughter's former high school football coach Maxie Lambright offered him an assistant coaching position on the Louisiana Tech football staff. He accepted the offer and coached the offensive backfield for 12 years from 1967 to 1978. Notable Louisiana Tech football players coached by Slaughter include Terry Bradshaw, Phil Robertson of Duck Dynasty, Tommy Spinks, Roger Carr, Mike Barber, Pat Tilley, and Billy Ryckman.

== Personal life ==
Slaughter's son Bobby also played football at Louisiana Tech and was an All-American wide receiver in 1990 and was drafted by the San Francisco 49ers in 1991.

Slaughter was inducted into the Louisiana Tech University Athletic Hall of Fame in 1987. On August 6, 2016, Slaughter was inducted into the Ark-La-Tex Sports Museum of Champions at the Shreveport Convention Center.

Slaughter died at a care home in Ruston, Louisiana, on April 8, 2023, at the age of 81.
