= Dream Bowl =

College football all-star game

- Stadium: Lobo Stadium
- Location: Little Elm, Texas
- Previous stadiums: Salem Football Stadium (2016–2023)
- Previous locations: Roanoke, Virginia (2016–2023)
- Operated: 2013–present

Sponsors
- Cutting Edge Sports Management

The Dream Bowl is an independently operated annual post-season college football all-star game and showcase, played on Martin Luther King Jr. Day weekend to celebrate his legacy and to follow after this iconic "I Have a Dream" speech since 2013. The game showcases NFL draft prospects of those collegiate players who have completed their eligibility in NCAA Division I Football Championship Subdivision (FCS) and lower divisions.

== History ==
The Dream Bowl was first played in 2013 in Roanoke, Virginia. The game is organized by Cutting Edge Sports Management, who operate the game independently. The game and the associated scouting combine provide opportunity for players from smaller colleges to get exposure with scouts from various professional leagues, including the NFL, CFL, XFL and Europe.

== HBCU Spirit of America Bowl ==
In 2017 the "Dream Bowl" added a HBCU dedicated all-star game called HBCU Spirit of America Bowl and featured Historically Black Colleges and Universities which was played a day before. The game was canceled in 2022.

== Alumni ==
The game have sent multiple alumni to pro leagues since its inception, including: Tremon Smith, Jylan Ware, Michael Jones, Chester Rogers and Thomas Ives.

== Game results ==
Year	Date	Winning team	Score	Losing team	Ref
2013	January 21	Crusaders	37–0	Patriots	
2014	January 20	Crusaders	48–12	Patriots	
2015	January 18	Crusaders	28–27	Patriots	
2016	January 19	Crusaders	23–17	Patriots	
2017	January 16	Crusaders	38–30	Patriots	
2018	January 15	Patriots	37–24	Crusaders	
2019	January 21	Patriots	21–7	Crusaders	
2020	January 20	Crusaders	17–3	Patriots	
2021	Not held				
2022	January 15 (Note: Moved from January 17 due to the January 14–17, 2022 North American winter storm.)	Patriots	20–10	Crusaders	
2023	January 19	Crusaders	49–6	Patriots	
2024	January 21	Crusaders	21–7	Patriots	
2025	January 19	Crusaders	28–17	Patriots	
2026	January 11	Crusaders	39–30	Patriots	
