= Peabody Magnet High School =

Public high school in Alexandria, Louisiana

Location
- 2727 Jones Ave; Alexandria, Louisiana 71302; United States; 31°17′36″N 92°26′14″W

Information
- Former names: Peabody High School, Peabody Normal School, Peabody Industrial School, Peabody Training School
- Type: Public magnet high school
- Motto: Science and technology of tomorrow at your fingertips today.
- Established: 1895; 131 years ago
- Founders: John B. LaFargue, Sarah C.B. Mayo LaFargue
- School district: Rapides Parish School Board
- Superintendent: Jeff Powell
- Principal: Keandra Coleman-Ford
- Teaching staff: 53.44 (FTE)
- Grades: 9–12
- Enrollment: 779 (2023-2024)
- Student to teacher ratio: 14.58
- Campus type: Urban
- Colors: Kelly Green and white
- Mascot: Warhorses (for boys); Lady Warhorses (for girls)
- Yearbook: Warhorse
- Website: pmhs.rpsb.us

Peabody Magnet High School is a public magnet high school located in the South Alexandria subdivision of Alexandria, Louisiana in the United States. The school, a part of the Rapides Parish School Board, is named for one of its benefactors, George Foster Peabody (1852–1938), whose charitable foundation provided a grant to create the school. It was founded in 1895 as a segregated black of school and was formerly known as Peabody High School, Peabody Training School, Peabody Industrial School, and Peabody Normal School.

== History ==
The Peabody Magnet High School and Peabody Montessori Elementary School were named for its benefactor, George Foster Peabody (1852–1938), a wealthy philanthropist and head of the Peabody Education Fund. The Peabody Montessori Elementary School campus at Third and Bogan Streets was once known as the Peabody Industrial School (or Peabody Colored Industrial School). Peabody Industrial School was the only public school for Black students in Alexandria from 1st through 7th grade for many years.

John Baptist LaFargue founded Peabody Industrial School in 1895, with the assistance of his wife, Sarah C.B. Mayo LaFargue. In 1918, Mr. LaFargue added eighth and ninth grades to the school even though the US Department of Education did not approve the upper grades for Negro schools. Construction of a three-story building began on the location at Third and Bogan Streets in 1923 and was completed in 1925. In addition, a wooden building was constructed to serve as an auditorium. Two more grades were added to the school in 1930. In 1931, the State Department of Education (Negro Division) sent Beatrice Wallace Spottsville to the school to serve as a teacher trainer and Supervisor of Negro schools, making Peabody a training school. Peabody became a state-approved public high school in 1933. Mr. J.B. LaFargue served as principal of the school from 1900, until he retired in 1937.

Mr. D.F. Iles, who was a student at Peabody Training School in 1918, left in 1925 to attend high school at Leland College, due to the lack of high schools for Blacks in Rapides Parish at that time. After completing high school, he remained at Leland College, where he received his college degree in 1933. Mr. Iles returned to Peabody in 1934 to teach social studies. He later became assistant principal, then in 1937 began his tenure as principal. Mr. Iles ended his tenure at Peabody as principal in 1972 when he accepted a position at the Rapides Parish School Board. The first school building at the current Broadway Street site was completed in 1952, with D. F. Iles as principal. Mr. Iles transformed Peabody from an Industrial Training School offering training in home economics and industrial shop to a comprehensive high school offering courses in algebra, geometry, social studies, science, physics, chemistry, art, music, band, Spanish, French, business, auto mechanics, mechanical drawing, woodwork, sheet metal, distributive education, cooperative office education, and speech with an array of extracurricular activities. In August 1972, Mr. Iles retired as principal of Peabody and accepted a position at the Rapides Parish School Board's Central Office.

Mr. Samuel McKay, a distinguished chemistry teacher and community leader, succeeded Mr. Iles as the principal of Peabody from 1972 until 1981. Under his leadership, a physical expansion program to remodel the girls' gymnasium, construct a new boys' gymnasium, and construct an athletic field was initiated. Mr. McKay remained principal until 1981 when he accepted a position as Director of Magnet Schools at the Rapides Parish School Board's Central Office.

In November 1981, Dr. James Cleveland became the second principal of the newly formed Peabody Magnet High School. Under his leadership, the curriculum was enriched by the addition of the following courses: the LD program, vocational programs, building trades, horticulture, and the honors computer-based classes. Dr. Cleveland retired in 1987. Clayton P. Williams became principal the following year. In 1991, Mr. Williams resigned and was succeeded by Mr. Dennis Frazier. Mr. Frazier's leadership efforts were directed toward getting a new school built in 1995. On November 3, 1998, voters approved the bond for the construction of a new two-story Peabody at the current Broadway site. Mr. Frazier retired in 1998.

=== Segregation ===
Prior to desegregation, separate local schools were maintained for black and white students in Rapides Parish. Peabody was the high school available for African American students in Alexandria while white students attended nearby Bolton High School. Neighboring Pineville, a smaller town located north of Alexandria, across the Red River, hosted a similarly segregated Crepe Myrtle High School with white students attending Pineville High School & Tioga High School; in neighbouring Boyce, Louisiana, to the northwest of Alexandria, black students attended Wettermark High School with white students attending Boyce High School.

During McKay's tenure as principal of Peabody, the federal court mandated changing the school to Peabody Magnet High School with the goal of integrating the public school system in Rapides Parish. Busing was implemented to bring white students to Peabody. To enhance Peabody's ability to attract students, the following courses were added: welding, computer science, nursing, math and Chemistry with college credit as well as an array of honor courses. The Gifted & Talented program was also established at Peabody during this time.

In July 1998, Mrs. Peggie L. Davis, a 1968 graduate of Peabody High School was appointed principal and given the job of overseeing the building and development of the new Peabody Magnet High School. In November 2000, a groundbreaking ceremony was conducted. This marked the start of the massive demolishing of parts of the old 1952 structure and construction of the new state of the art Peabody Magnet High School.

In October 2001, Mr. Lee A. Dotson, Jr. became the new principal of Peabody Magnet High School.

== Magnet program ==
Peabody Magnet High School is one of two high schools in Rapides Parish with magnet concentrations, the other being Pineville High School.

The Magnet classes offered are:

- Engineering Studies, equipped with many new science labs.
- Pre-Law Studies, equipped with a full courtroom.
- Media Communications, equipped with a full radio station and television studio.
- Medical Studies
- Animation Design, equipped with light tables, animation testers, animation software, digital cameras, and sound mixers.

== Athletics ==
The high schools sports teams, the Peabody Warhorses, are members of the LHSAA.

The Warhorses participate in basketball, football, track and field, baseball, softball, soccer, swimming, powerlifting, Dance, Band, and cheerleading.

=== Championships ===
Basketball
The boys' basketball team has won eleven state championships and girls' basketball two state championships. The head basketball coach is Charles Smith, who has held the role since 1985.

Powerlifting
The schools powerlifting team has also added two District, one State and two National Championships in 2011-2012.

== Notable alumni ==
- Emmanuel Arceneaux – CFL player of the BC Lions current Minnesota Vikings 2010-2012.
- Markel Brown (born 1992) – basketball player in the Israeli Basketball Premier League, was named to ESPN All-American second-team 2008-2009, Louisiana Sportswriters Association's Farm/Bureau Mr. Basketball 2010
- Israel B. Curtis – African-American Democratic member of the Louisiana House of Representatives from 1992 to 2008
- Natalie Desselle-Reid – African-American actress best known for her starring role in B.A.P.S, Cinderella (ABC special), and Eve (U.S. TV series)
- Layon Gray – African-American playwright, director, best known for his Off-Broadway play Black Angels Over Tuskegee, the story of the Tuskegee Airmen.
- Odessa Cleveland – Film and television actress, most notable for playing Lt. Ginger Bayliss on seasons 1-4 of M*A*S*H (TV series).
- Raymond Jones – 1966 graduate was selected in second round of the 1970 National Football League draft as a defensive back by Philadelphia Eagles.
- Ike Leggett – County Executive of Montgomery County, Maryland.

== Principals ==
Since 1897, Peabody has been served by twelve principals:

- John B. LaFargue, 1895–1937
- D.F. Iles, 1937–1972
- Samuel McKay, 1972–1981
- James Cleveland, 1981–1987
- Clayton P. Williams, 1987–1991
- Dennis Frazier, 1991–1998
- Rita Touchton, 1998-1999
- Peggie L. Davis, 1999–2001
- Lee A. Dotson, 2001-2014
- Jamie Henagan, 2014-2021
- Dennis Stewart, 2021–2024
- Keandra Coleman-Ford, 2025–present
