= Buckeye High School (Louisiana) =

Coordinates: 31.36638°N 92.18555°W

Buckeye High School (Buckeye,Louisiana)
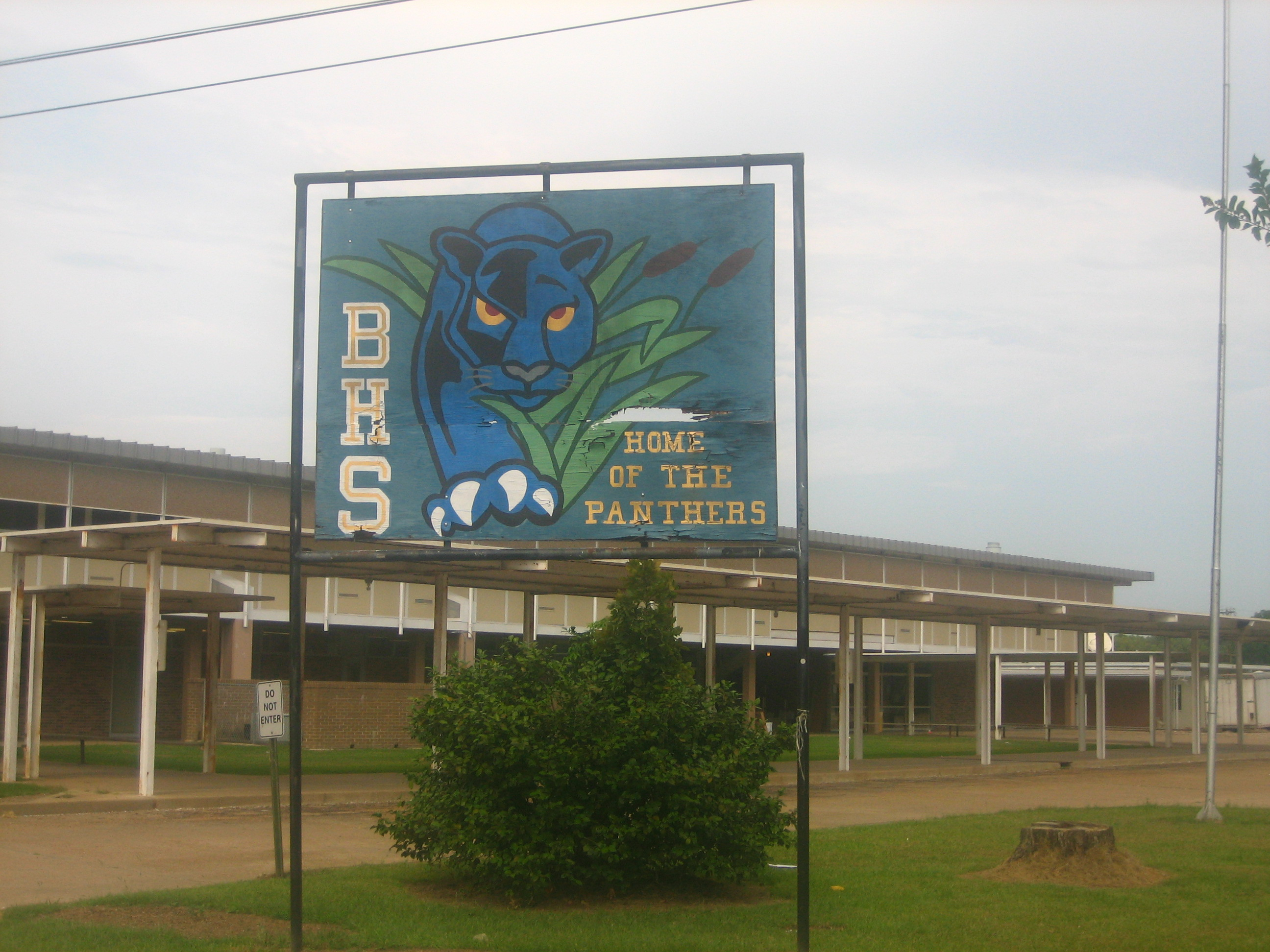
- Exterior of Buckeye High School in Buckeye, Louisiana
- 715 Hwy. 1207; Deville, LA 71328; United States

Information
- Type: High school
- School district: Rapides Parish School District
- Superintendent: Jeff Powell
- Director: Morey Skluzacek
- Principal: Rebecca Holt
- Head teacher: Ericka Luty
- Officer in charge: Justin Laprairie
- Grades: 6–12
- Enrollment: 963 (2023–2024)
- Colors: Blue and gold
- Mascot: Panther
- Nickname: Panthers
- Yearbook: The Panther
- Feeder schools: Buckeye Elementary School, Hayden R. Lawrence Elementary
- Website: sites.google.com/rpsb.us/bhs

Buckeye High School is a high school in Buckeye, Louisiana in northern Rapides Parish, Louisiana, United States. it has a mailing address of Deville, Louisiana because of the shared Buckeye/Deville Post office serving grades 6-12. The school serves the communities of Buckeye, Deville, Holloway Prairie, Big Island, Libuse, Hickory Grove, and some suburbs of Pineville. Like all schools in the Rapides Parish School District, the school has a uniform policy rather than permitting street clothes.

== History ==
The first Buckeye High School was held within the Buckeye Elementary School building in Deville, LA. Classes were first held in 1913, but the first graduation was not held until 1921 - with only two graduates. The high school remained a part of the elementary school until a new school building was constructed in 1928. The new building opened its doors in September 1928.

The Buckeye Three in 1981, with then-principal Charles Waites as he confirms their return to the school.

Buckeye High School was one of the last schools to become integrated in Rapides Parish. In 1981, the school became the source of local controversy after desegregation efforts by Federal District Judge Nauman Scott. Louisiana Ninth Judicial District Court Judge Richard Earl "Dick" Lee opposed Scott's plans, particularly his use of desegregation busing to racially integrate the school district. Scott had ordered the majority of the seventh and eighth-grade students to enroll at the primarily-black Jones Street School, with black students from Jones Street to be bused to Buckeye to compensate.

Lee centered his opposition around three Caucasian girls, soon referred to as the "Buckeye Three". He first convinced their parents to transfer custody of them to friends residing in the Buckeye catchment area in an attempt to maintain their enrollment in Buckeye High School. When that failed, he made the girls wards of the state then ordered that they remain at Buckeye. After months of legal duelling over the issue, the girls were compelled to register at Jones Street, but no penalties were levied against their families or Judge Lee.

The campus and surrounding community continue to be predominately Caucasian.

== Campus and education ==
The school is locally known for its college-styled campus. Buckeye consists of ten buildings: high school building, junior high building, sixth grade building, cafeteria, auditorium, music building, field house, boys' gym, girls' gym, and agriculture building.

Buckeye has both the core curriculum and electives, including courses in agricultural science, Human Geography, and shop classes such as welding.

== Extracurricular activities ==
=== Clubs ===
- 4-H
- Band
- Beta Club
- Choir
- Educators Rising
- Drill Team
- Future Business Leaders of America
- Family, Career and Community Leaders of America
- Future Farmers of America
- Flag Line
- Junior Civitan International
- Junior Reserve Officers' Training Corps
- Project 7
- Rodeo Club
- Science Club
- Student Government Association
- Speech and Debate Team
- Fellowship of Christian Students/Athletes
- Students Against Destructive Decisions

== Athletics ==
Buckeye High athletics competes in the LHSAA. The Buckeye sports team name is the Panthers, and the school colors are royal blue and gold.

The school offers a number of extracurricular sports, including: baseball, boys' and girls' basketball, boys' & girls' cross country, American football, boys' and girls' golf, boys' & girls' powerlifting, boys' and girls' soccer, softball, boys' & girls' track and field, and a co-ed fishing team.

=== Championships ===
Football
Since 1999, the Buckeye football team has won five district championships. The Panthers won their first district title in school history in 1999 and then again in 2008, 2012, 2013, and 2014.
